= List of members of the Folketing, 2007–2011 =

67th Folketing
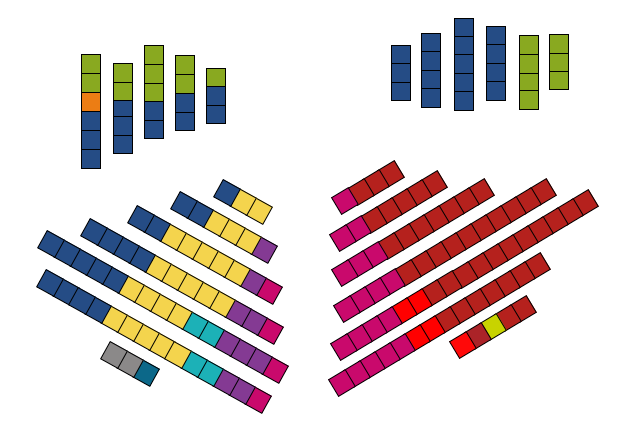
- Term: 13 November 2007 – 15 September 2011
- Speaker: V Thor Pedersen
- Prime Minister: V Anders Fogh Rasmussen; V Lars Løkke Rasmussen
- Cabinet: Fogh Rasmussen III; Lars Løkke Rasmussen I
- Previous: 2005–2007
- Next: 2011–2015

This is a list of the 179 members of the Folketing, in the 2007 to 2011 session. They were elected at the 2007 general election.

== Election results ==
Party	Votes	%	Seats	+/–
Denmark proper
Venstre	908,472	26.2	46	–6
Social Democrats	881,037	25.5	45	–2
Danish People's Party	479,532	13.9	25	+1
Socialist People's Party	450,975	13.0	23	+12
Conservative People's Party	359,404	10.4	18	±0
Danish Social Liberal Party	177,161	5.1	9	–8
New Alliance	97,295	2.8	5	New
Red-Green Alliance	74,982	2.2	4	–2
Christian Democrats	30,013	0.9	0	±0
Independents	549	0.0	0	±0
Invalid/blank votes	24,113	–	–	–
Total	3,483,533	100	175	0
Faroe Islands
Republic	5,849	25.4	1	±0
Union Party	5,414	23.5	1	+1
People's Party	4,728	20.5	0	–1
Social Democratic Party	4,702	20.4	0	±0
Centre Party	1,573	6.8	0	±0
Self-Government Party	799	3.5	0	0
Invalid/blank votes	149	–	–	–
Total	23,214	100	2	0
Greenland
Inuit Ataqatigiit	8,068	32.5	1	±0
Siumut	8,068	32.5	1	±0
Democrats	4,584	18.5	0	±0
Atassut	4,094	16.5	0	±0
Invalid/blank votes	500	–	–	–
Total	25,589	100	2	0
Source: Nohen & Stöver

== Seat distribution ==
Below is the distribution of the 179 seats as it appeared after the 2007 election, as well as the distribution at the end of the term.

On 27 August 2008 New Alliance changed their name to Liberal Alliance. All mentions of the party on this page will be under the name Liberal Alliance.

Party	Party leader	Elected seats	End seats	Change
A Social Democrats	Helle Thorning-Schmidt	45	45	Steady
B Social Liberal Party	Margrethe Vestager	9	9	Steady
C Conservatives	Lars Barfoed	18	17	▼1
F Socialist People's Party	Villy Søvndal	23	23	Steady
I Liberal Alliance	Anders Samuelsen	5	4	▼1
K Christian Democrats	Per Ørum Jørgensen	-	1	▲1
O Danish People's Party	Pia Kjærsgaard	25	24	▼1
V Liberals	Lars Løkke Rasmussen	46	46	Steady
Ø Red-Green Alliance	Collective leadership	4	4	Steady
TJ Republic	Høgni Hoydal	1	1	Steady
SP Union Party	Kaj Leo Johannesen	1	1	Steady
IA Community of the People	Kuupik Kleist	1	1	Steady
SI Forward	Aleqa Hammond	1	1	Steady
. Outside group		-	2	▲2

== Parliament members elected at the November 2007 election ==
Name	Birth year	Party	Constituency
Thomas Adelskov	1964	A Social Democrats	Zealand
Pia Adelsteen	1963	O Danish People's Party	North Zealand
Hanne Agersnap	1960	F Socialist People's Party	Greater Copenhagen
Yildiz Akdogan	1973	A Social Democrats	Copenhagen
Simon Emil Ammitzbøll-Bille	1977	B Social Liberal Party	Zealand
Eigil Andersen	1953	F Socialist People's Party	East Jutland
Kim Andersen	1957	V Liberals	East Jutland
Poul Andersen	1952	A Social Democrats	Funen
Sophie Hæstorp Andersen	1974	A Social Democrats	Greater Copenhagen
Christine Antorini	1965	A Social Democrats	Copenhagen
Ida Auken	1978	F Socialist People's Party	Copenhagen
Svend Auken	1943	A Social Democrats	East Jutland
Pernille Vigsø Bagge	1975	F Socialist People's Party	North Jutland
Line Barfod	1964	Ø Red-Green Alliance	Zealand
Lars Barfoed	1957	C Conservatives	North Zealand
Gitte Lillelund Bech	1969	V Liberals	Greater Copenhagen
Tom Behnke	1966	C Conservatives	East Jutland
Bendt Bendtsen	1954	C Conservatives	Funen
Per Bisgaard	1955	V Liberals	North Jutland
René Skau Björnsson	1967	A Social Democrats	East Jutland
Liselott Blixt	1965	O Danish People's Party	Zealand
Flemming Bonne	1944	F Socialist People's Party	Zealand
Erling Bonnesen	1955	V Liberals	Funen
Karl H. Bornhøft	1949	F Socialist People's Party	North Jutland
Colette Brix	1950	O Danish People's Party	Zealand
Henrik Brodersen	1964	O Danish People's Party	Zealand
Kirsten Brosbøl	1977	A Social Democrats	East Jutland
Morten Bødskov	1970	A Social Democrats	Greater Copenhagen
Bent Bøgsted	1956	O Danish People's Party	North Jutland
Anne Baastrup	1952	F Socialist People's Party	Funen
Mogens Camre	1936	O Danish People's Party	South Jutland
Özlem Sara Cekic	1976	F Socialist People's Party	Copenhagen
Carina Christensen	1972	C Conservatives	South Jutland
Ole Vagn Christensen	1943	A Social Democrats	North Jutland
Peter Christensen	1975	V Liberals	South Jutland
Troels Christensen	1954	V Liberals	Zealand
Anne-Mette Winther Christiansen	1966	V Liberals	East Jutland
Kim Christiansen	1956	O Danish People's Party	East Jutland
Pia Christmas-Møller	1961	C Conservatives	North Zealand
Per Clausen	1955	Ø Red-Green Alliance	East Jutland
Bente Dahl	1946	B Social Liberal Party	South Jutland
Jonas Dahl	1978	F Socialist People's Party	East Jutland
Kristian Thulesen Dahl	1969	O Danish People's Party	Funen
Lennart Damsbo-Andersen	1956	A Social Democrats	Zealand
Karina Lorentzen Dehnhardt	1973	F Socialist People's Party	South Jutland
Mikkel Dencker	1975	O Danish People's Party	Greater Copenhagen
Jørn Dohrmann	1969	O Danish People's Party	South Jutland
Lone Dybkjær	1940	B Social Liberal Party	Copenhagen
Pia Olsen Dyhr	1971	F Socialist People's Party	North Zealand
Charlotte Dyremose	1977	C Conservatives	Greater Copenhagen
Louise Schack Elholm	1977	V Liberals	Zealand
Karen Ellemann	1969	V Liberals	Greater Copenhagen
Benny Engelbrecht	1970	A Social Democrats	South Jutland
Lene Espersen	1965	C Conservatives	North Jutland
Søren Espersen	1953	O Danish People's Party	Greater Copenhagen
Mia Falkenberg	1983	O Danish People's Party	Zealand
Pernille Frahm	1954	F Socialist People's Party	East Jutland
Claus Hjort Frederiksen	1947	V Liberals	North Zealand
Mette Frederiksen	1977	A Social Democrats	Greater Copenhagen
Steen Gade	1945	F Socialist People's Party	South Jutland
Søren Gade	1963	V Liberals	West Jutland
Mette Gjerskov	1966	A Social Democrats	Zealand
Carsten Hansen	1957	A Social Democrats	Funen
Christian H. Hansen	1963	O Danish People's Party	West Jutland
Eva Kjer Hansen	1964	V Liberals	South Jutland
Lene Hansen	1948	A Social Democrats	North Jutland
Torben Hansen	1965	A Social Democrats	East Jutland
Marlene Harpsøe	1983	O Danish People's Party	North Zealand
Orla Hav	1952	A Social Democrats	North Jutland
Connie Hedegaard	1960	C Conservatives	Greater Copenhagen
Juliane Henningsen	1984	IA Community of the People	Greenland
Martin Henriksen	1980	O Danish People's Party	Copenhagen
Magnus Heunicke	1975	A Social Democrats	Zealand
Britta Schall Holberg	1941	V Liberals	Funen
Anne Grete Holmsgaard	1948	F Socialist People's Party	Copenhagen
Birthe Rønn Hornbech	1943	V Liberals	Zealand
Høgni Hoydal	1966	TJ Republic	Faroe Islands
Rikke Hvilshøj	1970	V Liberals	Copenhagen
Karen Hækkerup	1974	A Social Democrats	Copenhagen
Klaus Hækkerup	1943	A Social Democrats	North Zealand
Nick Hækkerup	1968	A Social Democrats	North Zealand
Ole Hækkerup	1971	A Social Democrats	Zealand
Henrik Høegh	1952	V Liberals	Zealand
Karsten Hønge	1958	F Socialist People's Party	Funen
Bertel Haarder	1944	V Liberals	Greater Copenhagen
Marianne Jelved	1943	B Social Liberal Party	North Jutland
Jacob Jensen	1973	V Liberals	Zealand
Kristian Jensen	1971	V Liberals	West Jutland
Leif Lahn Jensen	1967	A Social Democrats	East Jutland
Michael Aastrup Jensen	1976	V Liberals	East Jutland
Mogens Jensen	1963	A Social Democrats	West Jutland
Nanna Westerby Jensen	1984	F Socialist People's Party	North Jutland
Thomas Jensen	1970	A Social Democrats	West Jutland
Karen Jespersen	1947	V Liberals	East Jutland
Edmund Joensen	1944	SP Union Party	Faroe Islands
Lars-Emil Johansen	1946	SI Forward	Greenland
Birgitte Josefsen	1951	V Liberals	North Jutland
Peter Juel-Jensen	1966	V Liberals	Bornholm
Per Ørum Jørgensen	1970	C Conservatives	West Jutland
Naser Khader	1963	I Liberal Alliance	Copenhagen
Vivi Kier	1958	C Conservatives	Funen
Jens Kirk	1942	V Liberals	West Jutland
Henriette Kjær	1966	C Conservatives	East Jutland
Pia Kjærsgaard	1947	O Danish People's Party	Zealand
Karen J. Klint	1947	A Social Democrats	South Jutland
Anita Knakkergaard	1947	O Danish People's Party	North Jutland
Jeppe Kofod	1974	A Social Democrats	Bornholm
Astrid Krag	1982	F Socialist People's Party	Zealand
Søren Krarup	1937	O Danish People's Party	South Jutland
Henrik Dam Kristensen	1957	A Social Democrats	East Jutland
Knud Kristensen	1953	C Conservatives	North Jutland
Jesper Langballe	1939	O Danish People's Party	West Jutland
Flemming Damgaard Larsen	1951	V Liberals	Zealand
Henrik Sass Larsen	1966	A Social Democrats	Zealand
Karsten Lauritzen	1983	V Liberals	North Jutland
Bjarne Laustsen	1953	A Social Democrats	North Jutland
Mike Legarth	1960	C Conservatives	South Jutland
Lars Christian Lilleholt	1965	V Liberals	Funen
Kristian Pihl Lorentzen	1961	V Liberals	West Jutland
Jens Christian Lund	1945	A Social Democrats	West Jutland
Mogens Lykketoft	1946	A Social Democrats	Greater Copenhagen
Sophie Løhde	1983	V Liberals	North Zealand
Anne-Marie Meldgaard	1948	A Social Democrats	East Jutland
Morten Messerschmidt	1980	O Danish People's Party	East Jutland
Brian Mikkelsen	1966	C Conservatives	Zealand
Flemming Møller Mortensen	1963	A Social Democrats	North Jutland
Kim Mortensen	1964	A Social Democrats	South Jutland
Helge Adam Møller	1942	C Conservatives	Zealand
Lone Møller	1949	A Social Democrats	North Zealand
Per Stig Møller	1942	C Conservatives	Copenhagen
Tina Nedergaard	1969	V Liberals	North Jutland
Holger K. Nielsen	1950	F Socialist People's Party	Greater Copenhagen
Jakob Axel Nielsen	1967	C Conservatives	North Jutland
Karsten Nonbo	1952	V Liberals	Zealand
Karin Nødgaard	1966	O Danish People's Party	South Jutland
Ellen Trane Nørby	1980	V Liberals	South Jutland
John Dyrby Paulsen	1963	A Social Democrats	Zealand
Thor Pedersen	1945	V Liberals	North Zealand
Torsten Schack Pedersen	1976	V Liberals	North Jutland
Jesper Petersen	1981	F Socialist People's Party	South Jutland
Morten Helveg Petersen	1966	B Social Liberal Party	Greater Copenhagen
Niels Helveg Petersen	1939	B Social Liberal Party	Funen
Tina Petersen	1965	O Danish People's Party	Funen
Søren Pind	1969	V Liberals	Copenhagen
Ib Poulsen	1965	O Danish People's Party	North Jutland
Johannes Poulsen	1955	B Social Liberal Party	West Jutland
Jørgen Poulsen	1943	I Liberal Alliance	South Jutland
Troels Lund Poulsen	1976	V Liberals	East Jutland
Rasmus Prehn	1973	A Social Democrats	North Jutland
Kamal Qureshi	1970	F Socialist People's Party	Copenhagen
Julie Rademacher	1984	A Social Democrats	South Jutland
Anders Fogh Rasmussen	1953	V Liberals	Zealand
Lars Løkke Rasmussen	1964	V Liberals	North Zealand
Preben Rudiengaard	1944	V Liberals	South Jutland
Anders Samuelsen	1967	I Liberal Alliance	East Jutland
Helge Sander	1950	V Liberals	North Jutland
Johanne Schmidt-Nielsen	1984	Ø Red-Green Alliance	Copenhagen
Hans Christian Schmidt	1953	V Liberals	South Jutland
Gitte Seeberg	1960	I Liberal Alliance	North Zealand
Lise von Seelen	1949	A Social Democrats	South Jutland
Niels Sindal	1950	A Social Democrats	Funen
Helle Sjelle	1971	C Conservatives	Copenhagen
Hans Kristian Skibby	1969	O Danish People's Party	East Jutlands
Julie Skovsby	1978	A Social Democrats	Funen
Peter Skaarup	1964	O Danish People's Party	Copenhagen
Ole Sohn	1954	A Social Democrats	Zealand
Inger Støjberg	1973	V Liberals	West Jutland
Villy Søvndal	1952	F Socialist People's Party	South Jutland
Hans Christian Thoning	1952	V Liberals	South Jutland
Helle Thorning-Schmidt	1966	A Social Democrats	Copenhagen
Kristen Touborg	1943	F Socialist People's Party	West Jutland
Ulla Tørnæs	1962	V Liberals	South Jutland
Jens Peter Vernersen	1947	A Social Democrats	West Jutland
Eyvind Vesselbo	1946	V Liberals	East Jutland
Margrethe Vestager	1968	B Social Liberal Party	North Zealand
Jens Vibjerg	1949	V Liberals	South Jutland
Morten Østergaard	1976	B Social Liberal Party	East Jutland
Frank Aaen	1951	Ø Red-Green Alliance	Greater Copenhagen
Malou Aamund	1969	I Liberal Alliance	North Zealand

== Party and member changes after the November 2007 elections ==
=== Party changes ===
Below are all parliament members that have joined another party or become independent during the term.

Name	Old party	Constituency	New party	Date
Pia Christmas-Møller	C Conservatives	North Zealand	. Independent	5 December 2007
Gitte Seeberg	I Liberal Alliance	North Zealand	. Independent	29 January 2008
Malou Aamund	I Liberal Alliance	North Zealand	V Liberals	6 February 2008
Jørgen Poulsen	I Liberal Alliance	South Jutland	. Independent	23 June 2008
Jørgen Poulsen	. Independent	South Jutland	B Social Liberal Party	12 August 2008
Simon Emil Ammitzbøll-Bille	B Social Liberal Party	Zealand	. Independent	8 October 2008
Simon Emil Ammitzbøll-Bille	. Independent	Zealand	I Liberal Alliance	16 June 2009
Naser Khader	I Liberal Alliance	Copenhagen	. Independent	5 January 2009
Naser Khader	. Independent	Copenhagen	C Conservatives	18 March 2009
Christian H. Hansen	O Danish People's Party	West Jutland	. Independent	18 January 2010
Per Ørum Jørgensen	C Conservatives	West Jutland	. Independent	19 May 2010
Per Ørum Jørgensen	. Independent	West Jutland	K Christian Democrats	21 June 2010

=== Lasting member changes ===
Below are member changes that lasted through the entire term.

Replacement	Birth year	Party	Constituency	Replaced MP	Date	Reason
Anita Christensen	1973	O Danish People's Party	South Jutland	Mogens Camre	15 November 2007	Camre resigned his seat.
Marion Pedersen	1949	V Liberals	Copenhagen	Rikke Hvilshøj	17 August 2008	Hvilshøj resigned her seat.
Villum Christensen	1954	I Liberal Alliance	North Zealand	Gitte Seeberg	1 September 2008	Seeberg resigned her seat.
René Christensen	1970	O Danish People's Party	Zealand	Mia Falkenberg	9 October 2008	Falkenberg resigned her seat.
Flemming Møller	1950	V Liberals	Zealand	Anders Fogh Rasmussen	21 April 2009	Rasmussen resigned his seat.
Jørgen S. Lundsgaard	1945	C Conservatives	Funen	Bendt Bendtsen	18 June 2009	Bendtsen resigned his seat.
Per Dalgaard	1944	O Danish People's Party	East Jutland	Morten Messerschmidt	19 June 2009	Messerschmidt resigned his seat.
Maja Panduro	1982	A Social Democrats	East Jutland	Svend Auken	5 August 2009	Auken died.
Anne Marie G. Andersen	1981	B Social Liberal Party	Greater Copenhagen	Morten Helveg Petersen	1 September 2009	Petersen resigned his seat.
Vibeke Grave	1958	A Social Democrats	Zealand	Thomas Adelskov	1 January 2010	Adelskov resigned his seat.
Per Husted	1966	A Social Democrats	North Jutland	Lene Hansen	1 January 2010	Hanses resigned her seat.
Tage Leegaard	1954	C Conservatives	North Jutland	Knud Kristensen	1 January 2010	Kristensen resigned his seat.
Henrik Rasmussen	1971	C Conservatives	Greater Copenhagen	Connie Hedegaard	4 January 2010	Hedegaard resigned her seat.
Mads Rørvig	1985	V Liberals	West Jutland	Søren Gade	24 February 2010	Gade resigned his seat.
Rasmus Jarlov	1977	C Conservatives	Greater Copenhagen	Henrik Rasmussen	1 September 2010	Rasmussen resigned his seat.
Meta Fuglsang	1960	F Socialist People's Party	Zealand	Flemming Bonne	11 September 2010	Bonne died.
Daniel Rugholm	1982	C Conservatives	North Jutland	Jakob Axel Nielsen	1 November 2010	Nielsen resigned his seat.
Niels Høiby	1941	I Liberal Alliance	North Zealand	Malou Aamund	5 June 2011	Aamund resigned her seat.

=== Temporary member changes ===
Below are temporary member replacements during the term.

Replacement	Birth year	Party	Constituency	Replaced MP	Start	End	Length
Henrik Rasmussen	1971	C Conservatives	Greater Copenhagen	Charlotte Dyremose	29 November 2007	26 March 2008	127 days
Kaj Leo Johannesen	1964	SP Union Party	Faroe Islands	Edmund Joensen	4 December 2007	14 December 2007	10 days
Flemming Møller	1950	V Liberals	Zealand		8 January 2008	1 April 2008	84 days
René Christensen	1970	O Danish People's Party	Zealand	Mia Falkenberg	10 January 2008	8 October 2008	272 days
Vibeke Grave	1958	A Social Democrats	Zealand	Magnus Heunicke	10 January 2008	29 February 2008	50 days
Torben Lund	1948	F Socialist People's Party	Copenhagen	Özlem Sara Cekic	10 January 2008	8 October 2008	272 days
Pernille Søndergaard	1961	Ø Red-Green Alliance	Zealand	Line Barfod	15 January 2008	28 January 2008	13 days
Anders Broholm	1984	V Liberals	North Jutland	Torsten Schack Pedersen	22 January 2008	28 January 2008	6 days
Sjúrður Skaale	1967	TJ Republic	Faroe Islands	Høgni Hoydal	19 February 2008	8 September 2008	202 days
Anders Broholm	1984	V Liberals	North Jutland	Torsten Schack Pedersen	1 April 2008	30 April 2008	29 days
Jane Alrø Sørensen	1978	F Socialist People's Party	East Jutland	Pernille Frahm	13 April 2008	19 April 2008	6 days
Annita á Fríðriksmørk	1968	TJ Republic	Faroe Islands	Høgni Hoydal	9 September 2008	24 October 2008	45 days
Kenneth F. Christensen	1976	A Social Democrats	Greater Copenhagen	Sophie Hæstorp Andersen	7 October 2008	31 March 2009	175 days
Sidsel Homann	1978	F Socialist People's Party	West Jutland	Kristen Touborg	9 October 2008	6 November 2008	28 days
Ulrik Kragh	1970	V Liberals	East Jutland	Michael Aastrup Jensen	29 October 2008	19 November 2008	21 days
Karin Storgaard	1940	O Danish People's Party	Copenhagen	Martin Henriksen	29 October 2008	19 November 2008	21 days
Thomas Horn	1972	A Social Democrats	North Zealand	Lone Møller	29 October 2008	20 November 2008	22 days
Troels Ravn	1961	A Social Democrats	South Jutland	Lise von Seelen	29 October 2008	20 November 2008	22 days
Annette Vilhelmsen	1959	F Socialist People's Party	Funen	Anne Baastrup	29 October 2008	19 December 2008	51 days
Anders Broholm	1984	V Liberals	North Jutland	Karsten Lauritzen	31 October 2008	14 November 2008	14 days
Niels Christian Nielsen	1957	A Social Democrats	Funen	Julie Skovsby	3 November 2008	31 August 2009	301 days
Dennis Flydtkjær	1978	O Danish People's Party	West Jutland	Christian H. Hansen	20 November 2008	31 January 2010	437 days
Meta Fuglsang	1960	F Socialist People's Party	Zealand	Astrid Krag	2 February 2009	31 January 2010	363 days
Vibeke Grave	1958	A Social Democrats	Zealand	Mette Gjerskov	10 March 2009	23 March 2009	13 days
Per Husted	1966	A Social Democrats	North Jutland	Rasmus Prehn	24 March 2009	20 April 2009	27 days
Trine Mach	1969	F Socialist People's Party	Copenhagen	Ida Auken	14 April 2009	29 May 2009	45 days
Per Husted	1966	A Social Democrats	North Jutland	Orla Hav	21 April 2009	29 May 2009	38 days
Annette Vilhelmsen	1959	F Socialist People's Party	Funen	Karsten Hønge	14 May 2009	18 June 2009	35 days
Doris Jakobsen	1978	SI Forward	Greenland	Lars-Emil Johansen	8 October 2009	30 November 2009	53 days
Thomas Horn	1972	A Social Democrats	North Zealand	Klaus Hækkerup	28 October 2009	16 November 2009	19 days
Mads Rørvig	1985	V Liberals	West Jutland	Kristian Pihl Lorentzen	28 October 2009	18 November 2009	21 days
Jane Alrø Sørensen	1978	F Socialist People's Party	East Jutland	Pernille Frahm	28 October 2009	18 November 2009	21 days
Bente Kronborg Holst	1982	O Danish People's Party	West Jutland	Jesper Langballe	28 October 2009	19 November 2009	22 days
Per Løkken	1962	C Conservatives	East Jutland	Henriette Kjær	28 October 2009	19 November 2009	22 days
Helle Dam	1960	A Social Democrats	West Jutland	Mogens Jensen	29 October 2009	19 November 2009	21 days
Per Husted	1966	A Social Democrats	North Jutland	Rasmus Prehn	24 November 2009	18 December 2009	24 days
Henrik Rasmussen	1971	C Conservatives	Greater Copenhagen	Charlotte Dyremose	1 December 2009	3 January 2010	33 days
Rasmus Jarlov	1977	C Conservatives	Greater Copenhagen	Charlotte Dyremose	12 January 2010	31 August 2010	231 days
Sofia Rossen	1961	IA Community of the People	Greenland	Juliane Henningsen	12 January 2010	4 October 2010	265 days
Irene Simonsen	1958	V Liberals	East Jutland	Karen Jespersen	12 January 2010	30 April 2010	108 days
Steen Konradsen	1948	C Conservatives	West Jutland	Per Ørum Jørgensen	11 February 2010	18 April 2010	66 days
Sanne Rubinke	1961	F Socialist People's Party	East Jutland	Jonas Dahl	11 February 2010	5 March 2010	22 days
Jette Plesner Dali	1948	O Danish People's Party	East Jutlands	Hans Kristian Skibby	1 March 2010	7 March 2010	6 days
Erika Lorentsen	1957	B Social Liberal Party	West Jutland	Johannes Poulsen	6 April 2010	9 May 2010	33 days
Peter Madsen	1957	V Liberals	Zealand	Louise Schack Elholm	3 May 2010	2 July 2010	60 days
Kasper Krüger	1973	V Liberals	Greater Copenhagen	Gitte Lillelund Bech	10 June 2010	16 June 2010	6 days
Peter Madsen	1957	V Liberals	Zealand	Louise Schack Elholm	7 September 2010	17 December 2010	101 days
Kurt Sceelsbeck	1956	C Conservatives	Greater Copenhagen	Charlotte Dyremose	7 September 2010	30 November 2010	84 days
Peter Westermann	1985	F Socialist People's Party	North Jutland	Nanna Westerby Jensen	5 October 2010	17 December 2010	73 days
Malene Søgaard-Andersen	1979	F Socialist People's Party	South Jutland	Jesper Petersen	14 October 2010	21 January 2011	99 days
Hüseyin Arac	1956	A Social Democrats	East Jutland	Kirsten Brosbøl	26 October 2010	28 August 2011	306 days
Jens Arne Hedegaard	1951	V Liberals	North Jutland	Per Bisgaard	27 October 2010	18 November 2010	22 days
Bilal Inekci	1958	F Socialist People's Party	Greater Copenhagen	Hanne Agersnap	27 October 2010	18 November 2010	22 days
Erika Lorentsen	1957	B Social Liberal Party	West Jutland	Johannes Poulsen	27 October 2010	18 November 2010	22 days
Anna Kirsten Olesen	1958	A Social Democrats	North Jutland	Flemming Møller Mortensen	27 October 2010	18 November 2010	22 days
Irene Simonsen	1958	V Liberals	East Jutland	Anne-Mette Winther Christiansen	27 October 2010	18 November 2010	22 days
Manu Sareen	1967	B Social Liberal Party	Copenhagen	Lone Dybkjær	1 January 2011	15 April 2011	104 days
Trine Mach	1969	F Socialist People's Party	Copenhagen	Ida Auken	10 January 2011	1 June 2011	142 days
Dorrit Knudsen	1960	A Social Democrats	Bornholm	Jeppe Kofod	25 January 2011	11 February 2011	17 days
Kenneth Kristensen Berth	1977	O Danish People's Party	Greater Copenhagen	Søren Espersen	22 February 2011	6 March 2011	12 days
Nadeem Farooq	1976	B Social Liberal Party	Greater Copenhagen	Anne Marie G. Andersen	17 March 2011	6 April 2011	20 days
Nadeem Farooq	1976	B Social Liberal Party	Greater Copenhagen	Anne Marie G. Andersen	1 August 2011	28 August 2011	27 days
