= Results of the 2007 Danish general election =

This article gives detailed results of the 2007 Danish parliamentary election. The Folketing has 179 members. Of these, 135 are elected by proportional representation at district level, while another 40 are allocated based on votes aggregated to the regional level. An additional four members are elected to represent Greenland and the Faroe Islands.

== Results summary ==
Party	Votes	%	Seats	+/–
Denmark proper
Venstre	908,472	26.26	46	–6
Social Democrats	881,037	25.47	45	–2
Danish People's Party	479,532	13.86	25	+1
Socialist People's Party	450,975	13.04	23	+12
Conservative People's Party	359,404	10.39	18	0
Danish Social Liberal Party	177,161	5.12	9	–8
New Alliance	97,295	2.81	5	New
Red–Green Alliance	74,982	2.17	4	–2
Christian Democrats	30,013	0.87	0	0
Independents	549	0.02	0	0
Total	3,459,420	100.00	175	0
Valid votes	3,459,420	99.31		
Invalid/blank votes	24,113	0.69		
Total votes	3,483,533	100.00		
Registered voters/turnout	4,022,920	86.59		
Faroe Islands
Republic	5,849	25.36	1	0
Union Party	5,414	23.47	1	+1
People's Party	4,728	20.50	0	–1
Social Democratic Party	4,702	20.39	0	0
Centre Party	1,573	6.82	0	0
Self-Government	799	3.46	0	0
Total	23,065	100.00	2	0
Valid votes	23,065	99.36		
Invalid/blank votes	149	0.64		
Total votes	23,214	100.00		
Registered voters/turnout	34,529	67.23		
Greenland
Inuit Ataqatigiit	8,343	33.25	1	0
Siumut	8,068	32.16	1	0
Democrats	4,584	18.27	0	0
Atassut	4,094	16.32	0	0
Total	25,089	100.00	2	0
Valid votes	25,089	98.05		
Invalid/blank votes	500	1.95		
Total votes	25,589	100.00		
Registered voters/turnout	39,634	64.56		
Source: Danmarks Statistik, Nohen & Stöver

== Vote share - Denmark ==
Division	A	B	C	F	K	O	V	Y	Ø	Others	Red	Blue
Division	%	%	%	%	%	%	%	%	%	%	%	%
Denmark	25.5	5.1	10.4	13.0	0.9	13.9	26.3	2.8	2.2	0.0	45.8	54.2

== Vote share by electoral division ==
Division	A	B	C	F	K	O	V	Y	Ø	Others	Red	Blue
Division	%	%	%	%	%	%	%	%	%	%	%	%
Mid & Northern Jutland	26.8	4.5	9.9	11.2	1.5	12.9	29.4	2.3	1.4	0.0	44.0	56.0
Zealand & Southern Denmark	24.9	4.0	9.6	12.6	0.6	15.9	28.6	2.4	1.4	0.0	42.9	57.1
Capital	24.6	7.2	11.9	15.6	0.5	12.4	19.7	3.9	4.0	0.0	51.4	48.6

== Vote share by constituency ==
Division	A	B	C	F	K	O	V	Y	Ø	Others	Red	Blue
Division	%	%	%	%	%	%	%	%	%	%	%	%
North Jutland	29.3	3.9	13.4	10.3	1.0	13.6	25.5	1.8	1.1	0.0	44.6	55.4
West Jutland	23.0	3.9	7.7	9.4	2.8	13.0	37.3	2.1	0.8	0.0	37.1	62.9
East Jutland	27.6	5.4	8.7	13.3	0.8	12.2	27.0	2.9	2.1	0.0	48.4	51.6
South Jutland	22.9	3.4	8.3	11.4	1.0	15.7	34.6	1.9	0.8	0.0	38.5	61.5
Funen	26.9	5.0	13.3	14.0	0.4	14.8	21.4	2.4	1.8	0.0	47.7	52.3
Zealand	25.5	3.9	8.5	12.8	0.4	16.7	27.8	2.7	1.6	0.0	43.9	56.1
North Zealand	20.7	7.2	13.8	10.8	0.5	12.6	28.2	4.3	2.0	0.0	40.6	59.4
Greater Copenhagen	27.6	5.5	13.2	13.3	0.5	14.6	19.4	3.3	2.5	0.0	48.9	51.1
Copenhagen	24.2	8.9	10.1	21.0	0.5	10.6	13.7	4.3	6.7	0.0	60.8	39.2
Bornholm	35.4	2.2	6.0	11.9	2.0	12.0	26.3	2.2	1.9	0.1	51.4	48.6

== Vote share by nomination district ==
Division	A	B	C	F	K	O	V	Y	Ø	Others	Red	Blue
Division	%	%	%	%	%	%	%	%	%	%	%	%
Frederikshavn	31.8	2.7	11.4	8.2	1.0	16.7	26.2	1.4	0.7	0.0	43.4	56.6
Hjørring	27.4	3.8	16.1	9.9	1.0	13.2	26.0	1.6	0.8	0.0	41.9	58.1
Brønderslev	29.8	3.0	12.5	9.0	1.3	14.1	28.0	1.5	0.7	0.0	42.5	57.5
Thisted	26.7	3.8	11.0	9.2	1.6	14.2	31.0	1.5	0.9	0.0	40.7	59.3
Himmerland	23.2	3.6	16.7	9.5	1.1	13.3	29.6	2.0	0.9	0.0	37.2	62.7
Mariagerfjord	27.8	3.6	12.8	9.5	0.9	14.1	28.5	1.9	0.8	0.0	41.7	58.2
Aalborg East	34.6	4.7	11.8	13.2	0.8	12.8	18.3	2.1	1.7	0.0	54.2	45.7
Aalborg West	28.7	5.3	15.9	12.3	0.6	11.2	22.1	2.1	1.7	0.0	48.0	52.0
Aalborg North	33.0	4.5	12.7	11.7	0.8	13.0	20.6	2.0	1.7	0.0	50.8	49.1
Struer	22.4	3.4	6.5	13.0	2.4	12.4	37.7	1.6	0.7	0.0	39.4	60.6
Skive	28.2	4.6	5.4	10.1	1.0	13.2	35.2	1.4	0.8	0.0	43.8	56.2
Viborg West	27.0	4.2	7.1	10.3	1.1	12.5	34.6	2.1	0.9	0.0	42.5	57.5
Viborg East	22.8	4.1	8.3	8.3	1.9	12.6	39.2	2.1	0.7	0.0	35.9	64.1
Silkeborg North	23.8	3.9	9.6	9.4	2.2	13.5	33.3	3.3	1.0	0.0	38.1	61.9
Silkeborg South	27.6	4.5	12.4	12.4	1.0	11.1	25.5	3.8	1.8	0.0	46.3	53.7
Ikast	20.0	3.1	8.4	7.0	3.8	17.3	38.2	1.7	0.6	0.0	30.6	69.4
Herning South	21.2	4.5	7.3	8.2	3.5	13.8	39.1	1.7	0.7	0.0	34.6	65.3
Herning North	17.7	3.8	7.1	6.2	4.7	13.0	45.2	1.7	0.6	0.1	28.2	71.7
Holstebro	24.4	3.8	5.5	10.3	2.7	11.3	39.8	1.5	0.8	0.0	39.2	60.8
Ringkøbing	17.2	3.4	7.7	7.9	6.5	13.6	41.5	1.9	0.5	0.0	28.9	71.1
Aarhus South	26.9	7.2	10.3	15.8	0.7	9.3	23.9	3.4	2.6	0.0	52.4	47.6
Aarhus West	30.9	5.2	7.9	15.4	0.9	12.2	20.8	2.9	3.8	0.0	55.3	44.6
Aarhus North	29.5	7.9	8.0	19.5	1.3	9.2	17.4	3.4	3.8	0.0	60.7	39.3
Aarhus East	24.1	9.4	10.5	18.5	0.8	7.1	21.8	3.8	3.9	0.0	56.0	44.0
Djurs	27.3	3.7	8.0	10.9	0.6	15.3	30.8	2.1	1.3	0.0	43.2	56.8
Randers North	34.9	3.1	6.6	9.4	0.7	14.7	27.9	1.8	0.9	0.0	48.3	51.7
Randers South	30.7	3.3	8.1	9.6	1.1	14.5	29.8	2.0	1.0	0.0	44.6	55.4
Favrskov	25.8	5.0	9.3	9.4	0.6	13.0	33.0	2.8	1.0	0.0	41.2	58.7
Skanderborg	26.5	5.1	9.2	12.0	0.5	11.4	30.5	3.1	1.6	0.0	45.1	54.8
Horsens	27.3	3.6	8.3	11.1	0.5	14.5	30.4	3.2	1.1	0.0	43.1	56.9
Hedensted	20.0	3.0	8.0	8.2	1.8	16.5	39.6	2.2	0.6	0.0	31.9	68.1
Sønderborg	25.6	3.0	7.1	9.5	0.5	18.2	33.5	1.8	0.7	0.0	38.9	61.1
Aabenraa	22.9	2.9	8.3	8.5	0.8	17.1	37.2	1.6	0.6	0.0	34.9	65.1
Tønder	22.0	3.0	7.7	8.9	1.3	15.4	39.4	1.6	0.7	0.0	34.6	65.4
City of Esbjerg	30.8	2.8	6.6	14.6	0.7	15.5	26.0	1.7	1.3	0.0	49.5	50.5
Greater Esbjerg	23.4	3.5	7.6	10.8	0.7	13.8	37.9	1.6	0.8	0.0	38.4	61.6
Varde	18.3	3.5	7.2	7.6	1.3	14.0	45.8	1.5	0.5	0.0	30.1	69.9
Vejen	20.4	3.1	7.9	8.6	1.2	15.5	40.9	1.9	0.5	0.0	32.7	67.3
Vejle North	18.9	4.7	9.9	11.0	1.2	15.6	35.4	2.5	1.0	0.0	35.5	64.5
Vejle South	22.6	4.4	9.4	13.4	1.2	15.8	29.5	2.6	1.1	0.0	41.6	58.4
Fredericia	26.6	3.1	9.3	13.9	0.9	16.4	27.0	2.0	0.9	0.0	44.5	55.5
Kolding North	18.6	4.4	11.3	15.8	0.8	13.8	32.0	2.4	0.9	0.0	39.8	60.2
Kolding South	19.9	3.8	10.8	16.0	1.1	15.7	29.8	1.9	0.9	0.0	40.7	59.3
Haderslev	23.3	2.9	7.2	11.3	1.2	15.8	35.8	1.9	0.7	0.0	38.1	61.9
Odense East	31.2	5.6	11.6	18.8	0.5	13.2	13.6	2.6	2.7	0.0	58.4	41.6
Odense West	29.0	4.7	16.3	14.9	0.3	14.5	16.2	2.3	1.8	0.0	50.4	49.6
Odense South	24.3	6.5	17.9	14.4	0.5	12.5	18.9	3.1	1.9	0.0	47.1	52.8
Assens	26.9	4.3	13.2	11.7	0.4	15.8	24.0	2.4	1.1	0.0	44.1	55.9
Middelfart	26.2	4.4	13.3	10.8	0.3	16.3	25.6	2.2	0.9	0.0	42.3	57.7
Nyborg	28.4	3.9	11.7	13.3	0.3	15.9	23.4	2.0	1.2	0.0	46.7	53.2
Svendborg	25.4	5.2	10.7	14.6	0.4	15.5	23.2	2.3	2.6	0.0	47.9	52.1
Faaborg	24.9	5.0	12.1	12.5	0.3	15.0	26.3	2.3	1.5	0.0	43.8	56.2
Lolland	25.5	1.7	4.8	25.8	0.2	16.8	22.6	1.3	1.2	0.0	54.2	45.8
Guldborgsund	30.7	3.0	7.0	12.7	0.4	17.0	25.9	2.0	1.4	0.0	47.8	52.2
Vordingborg	25.9	4.0	7.7	14.6	0.3	16.4	26.7	2.4	2.1	0.0	46.6	53.4
Næstved	29.4	3.4	9.8	11.5	0.4	15.9	25.7	2.5	1.3	0.0	45.6	54.4
Faxe	24.1	3.7	9.6	11.1	0.4	17.4	29.6	2.7	1.4	0.0	40.4	59.6
Køge	24.7	4.3	9.3	11.4	0.4	16.1	29.1	3.2	1.6	0.0	42.0	58.0
Greve	21.2	3.7	9.7	8.3	0.4	17.0	35.5	3.3	1.0	0.0	34.2	65.8
Roskilde	23.4	6.2	10.7	14.0	0.5	12.5	26.1	3.9	2.7	0.0	46.3	53.7
Holbæk	25.5	5.3	8.8	12.6	0.5	15.2	27.4	3.0	1.8	0.0	45.1	54.9
Kalundborg	24.6	4.0	6.6	12.5	0.3	20.2	27.9	2.4	1.5	0.0	42.6	57.4
Ringsted	25.1	4.1	8.6	11.8	0.5	16.6	28.6	3.1	1.5	0.0	42.5	57.5
Slagelse	26.0	2.9	7.6	12.0	0.4	19.9	27.5	2.4	1.3	0.0	42.3	57.7
Helsingør	25.3	6.9	11.7	12.9	0.4	13.7	22.6	4.1	2.5	0.0	47.5	52.5
Fredensborg	16.3	7.6	18.5	8.2	0.3	11.0	31.4	5.1	1.6	0.0	33.7	66.3
Hillerød	22.1	6.3	11.2	11.2	1.0	13.6	28.5	3.8	2.2	0.0	41.8	58.2
Frederikssund	25.8	4.8	9.4	11.7	0.5	16.8	26.1	3.0	1.8	0.0	44.2	55.8
Egedal	20.4	7.5	14.8	11.4	0.4	12.0	27.0	4.5	2.0	0.0	41.4	58.6
Rudersdal	14.4	9.8	17.8	9.3	0.4	8.4	32.5	5.6	1.9	0.0	35.3	64.7
Gentofte	13.7	8.0	27.8	8.9	0.4	7.9	25.5	5.5	2.4	0.0	32.9	67.1
Lyngby	20.3	8.9	18.8	12.1	0.5	9.8	22.5	4.8	2.3	0.0	43.7	56.3
Gladsaxe	27.7	6.7	10.7	15.6	0.5	13.3	18.4	3.6	3.4	0.0	53.4	46.6
Rødovre	33.2	4.4	9.3	14.6	0.8	16.5	16.4	2.3	2.5	0.0	54.8	45.2
Hvidovre	30.8	4.2	8.2	14.7	0.5	18.9	17.3	2.6	2.8	0.0	52.5	47.5
Brøndby	31.3	3.7	10.0	13.4	0.4	18.5	18.2	2.5	2.1	0.0	50.5	49.5
Taastrup	29.7	4.4	9.9	15.2	0.4	16.0	18.9	2.6	2.9	0.0	52.1	47.9
Ballerup	34.7	3.9	9.6	12.3	0.4	16.8	17.9	2.5	1.9	0.0	52.7	47.2
Easterbro	23.7	10.6	11.6	20.1	0.5	7.9	14.6	4.9	6.1	0.0	60.4	39.5
Sundvester	25.1	8.7	8.8	21.6	0.5	11.4	13.5	4.3	6.2	0.0	61.5	38.5
Indre By	19.2	11.7	12.0	21.4	0.4	5.6	14.6	6.0	9.1	0.0	61.4	38.5
Sundbyøster	26.2	7.8	7.8	22.0	0.6	12.4	13.8	3.9	5.3	0.1	61.4	38.6
Nørrebro	22.7	11.0	6.5	27.3	0.4	7.0	8.6	4.2	12.3	0.1	73.3	26.6
Bispebjerg	27.0	7.6	7.7	22.9	0.7	12.6	11.0	3.3	7.3	0.0	64.7	35.3
Brønshøj	27.1	7.1	8.6	20.4	0.6	13.7	13.4	3.6	5.5	0.0	60.1	39.9
Valby	27.2	7.1	8.5	21.4	0.4	13.1	13.1	3.6	5.5	0.0	61.3	38.7
Vesterbro	23.5	10.3	6.7	27.0	0.5	8.1	9.4	4.1	10.5	0.0	71.2	28.7
Falkoner	20.5	10.9	17.0	17.2	0.4	7.8	15.6	5.4	5.2	0.0	53.8	46.1
Slots	22.0	8.9	16.3	17.5	0.6	10.0	15.2	4.8	4.7	0.0	53.1	46.9
Tårnby	26.7	4.2	10.7	12.8	0.4	18.7	21.9	2.9	1.6	0.0	45.3	54.7
Rønne	39.4	2.3	6.1	11.5	1.9	11.9	23.4	1.7	1.7	0.1	55.0	44.9
Aakirkeby	31.6	2.1	5.9	12.2	2.1	12.1	28.9	2.7	2.1	0.1	48.1	51.8

== Vote share by region ==
Division	A	B	C	F	K	O	V	Y	Ø	Others	Red	Blue
Division	%	%	%	%	%	%	%	%	%	%	%	%
North Denmark	29.3	3.9	13.4	10.3	1.0	13.6	25.5	1.8	1.1	0.0	44.6	55.3
Central Denmark	25.7	4.8	8.2	11.7	1.7	12.5	31.3	2.6	1.6	0.0	43.7	56.2
Southern Denmark	24.5	4.1	10.4	12.4	0.7	15.3	29.2	2.1	1.2	0.0	42.3	57.7
Zealand	25.5	3.9	8.5	12.8	0.4	16.7	27.8	2.7	1.6	0.0	43.9	56.1
Capital	24.6	7.2	11.9	15.6	0.5	12.4	19.7	3.9	4.0	0.0	51.4	48.6

== Vote share by municipality ==
Division	A	B	C	F	K	O	V	Y	Ø	Others	Red	Blue
Division	%	%	%	%	%	%	%	%	%	%	%	%
Frederikshavn	32.0	2.7	11.5	8.2	0.9	16.6	26.0	1.4	0.7	0.0	43.5	56.5
Læsø	26.9	3.3	8.0	7.9	2.0	19.1	29.4	1.9	1.4	0.0	39.6	60.4
Hjørring	27.4	3.8	16.1	9.9	1.0	13.2	26.0	1.6	0.8	0.0	41.9	58.1
Brønderslev	29.9	3.1	12.5	9.1	1.2	13.6	28.3	1.6	0.8	0.0	42.8	57.2
Jammerbugt	29.7	3.0	12.4	9.0	1.5	14.7	27.7	1.5	0.7	0.0	42.3	57.7
Thisted	25.4	3.7	11.4	9.3	1.9	14.3	31.4	1.5	1.0	0.0	39.4	60.6
Morsø	29.3	4.2	10.1	9.1	0.9	14.0	30.2	1.4	0.8	0.0	43.3	56.7
Vesthimmerland Municipality	20.9	2.8	19.3	10.1	1.2	13.8	29.5	1.6	0.6	0.0	34.6	65.4
Rebild	26.2	4.6	13.4	8.7	0.9	12.7	29.7	2.4	1.2	0.0	40.7	59.3
Mariagerfjord	27.8	3.6	12.8	9.5	0.9	14.1	28.5	1.9	0.8	0.0	41.7	58.2
Aalborg	32.2	4.8	13.4	12.4	0.8	12.3	20.2	2.1	1.7	0.0	51.2	48.8
Lemvig	19.3	3.6	6.3	13.2	2.7	13.2	39.6	1.4	0.6	0.0	36.6	63.3
Struer	25.4	3.2	6.8	12.8	2.0	11.6	35.8	1.7	0.7	0.0	42.1	57.9
Skive	28.2	4.6	5.4	10.1	1.0	13.2	35.2	1.4	0.8	0.0	43.8	56.2
Viborg	25.0	4.2	7.7	9.4	1.5	12.6	36.8	2.1	0.8	0.0	39.4	60.6
Silkeborg	25.8	4.2	11.0	10.9	1.6	12.3	29.2	3.6	1.4	0.0	42.3	57.6
Ikast-Brande	20.0	3.1	8.4	7.0	3.8	17.3	38.2	1.7	0.6	0.0	30.6	69.4
Herning	19.4	4.1	7.2	7.2	4.1	13.4	42.2	1.7	0.6	0.0	31.3	68.6
Holstebro	24.4	3.8	5.5	10.3	2.7	11.3	39.8	1.5	0.8	0.0	39.2	60.8
Ringkøbing-Skjern	17.2	3.4	7.7	7.9	6.5	13.6	41.5	1.9	0.5	0.0	28.9	71.1
Aarhus	27.8	7.5	9.2	17.3	0.9	9.4	21.0	3.4	3.5	0.0	56.1	43.9
Municipality	25.4	4.2	8.8	11.9	0.5	14.7	30.6	2.5	1.4	0.0	42.9	57.1
Municipality	29.4	3.1	7.1	9.9	0.6	15.9	31.1	1.7	1.2	0.0	43.6	56.4
Randers	32.8	3.2	7.3	9.5	0.9	14.6	28.9	1.9	0.9	0.0	46.4	53.6
Favrskov	25.8	5.0	9.3	9.4	0.6	13.0	33.0	2.8	1.0	0.0	41.2	58.7
Odder	28.2	5.1	9.1	12.9	0.5	10.5	29.5	2.7	1.5	0.0	47.7	52.3
Samsø	25.0	4.8	8.3	14.5	0.5	12.1	29.2	2.7	2.9	0.0	47.2	52.8
Skanderborg	25.9	5.1	9.4	11.5	0.5	11.7	31.1	3.4	1.5	0.0	44.0	56.0
Horsens	27.3	3.6	8.3	11.1	0.5	14.5	30.4	3.2	1.1	0.0	43.1	56.9
Hedensted	20.0	3.0	8.0	8.2	1.8	16.5	39.6	2.2	0.6	0.0	31.9	68.1
Sønderborg	25.6	3.0	7.1	9.5	0.5	18.2	33.5	1.8	0.7	0.0	38.9	61.1
Aabenraa	22.9	2.9	8.3	8.5	0.8	17.1	37.2	1.6	0.6	0.0	34.9	65.1
Tønder	22.0	3.0	7.7	8.9	1.3	15.4	39.4	1.6	0.7	0.0	34.6	65.4
Esbjerg	27.5	3.1	7.1	12.7	0.7	14.7	31.6	1.6	1.0	0.0	44.3	55.7
Fanø	23.3	4.2	8.4	17.0	0.6	14.0	27.9	2.6	2.1	0.0	46.5	53.5
Varde	18.3	3.5	7.2	7.6	1.3	14.0	45.8	1.5	0.5	0.0	30.1	69.9
Vejen	21.6	3.3	8.0	9.2	0.7	15.0	39.8	1.9	0.5	0.0	34.5	65.5
Billund	18.6	2.9	7.7	7.8	1.9	16.2	42.6	1.9	0.5	0.0	29.8	70.2
Vejle	20.8	4.5	9.6	12.2	1.2	15.7	32.3	2.5	1.1	0.0	38.6	61.4
Fredericia	26.6	3.1	9.3	13.9	0.9	16.4	27.0	2.0	0.9	0.0	44.5	55.5
Kolding	19.3	4.1	11.0	15.9	0.9	14.8	30.9	2.1	0.9	0.0	40.2	59.8
Haderslev	23.3	2.9	7.2	11.3	1.2	15.8	35.8	1.9	0.7	0.0	38.1	61.9
Odense	28.1	5.7	15.3	16.0	0.4	13.4	16.3	2.7	2.1	0.0	51.9	48.1
Assens	26.9	4.3	13.2	11.7	0.4	15.8	24.0	2.4	1.1	0.0	44.1	55.9
Middelfart	26.6	5.0	12.3	11.0	0.4	15.6	25.6	2.5	1.0	0.0	43.6	56.4
Nordfyn	25.6	3.6	14.6	10.5	0.2	17.1	25.5	1.9	0.8	0.0	40.6	59.4
Nyborg	28.3	3.9	10.7	13.1	0.3	15.8	24.6	2.0	1.3	0.0	46.6	53.4
Kerteminde	28.4	4.0	12.9	13.4	0.4	16.0	21.7	2.0	1.1	0.0	46.9	53.0
Svendborg	25.6	5.4	11.0	15.1	0.4	14.6	22.8	2.4	2.7	0.0	48.8	51.2
Langeland	24.9	4.4	9.6	12.7	0.3	19.1	24.7	2.1	2.3	0.0	44.2	55.8
Faaborg-Midtfyn	24.8	5.2	11.6	12.8	0.3	15.0	26.5	2.4	1.4	0.0	44.2	55.8
Ærø	25.6	3.4	16.3	10.3	0.4	15.7	25.2	1.8	1.5	0.0	40.8	59.2
Lolland	25.5	1.7	4.8	25.8	0.2	16.8	22.6	1.3	1.2	0.0	54.2	45.8
Guldborgsund	30.7	3.0	7.0	12.7	0.4	17.0	25.9	2.0	1.4	0.0	47.8	52.2
Vordingborg	25.9	4.0	7.7	14.6	0.3	16.4	26.7	2.4	2.1	0.0	46.6	53.4
Næstved	29.4	3.4	9.8	11.5	0.4	15.9	25.7	2.5	1.3	0.0	45.6	54.4
Faxe	24.1	3.8	9.7	11.2	0.5	17.4	29.4	2.6	1.4	0.0	40.5	59.5
Stevns	24.2	3.6	9.4	11.0	0.3	17.3	30.0	2.8	1.3	0.0	40.1	59.9
Køge	26.0	3.8	9.4	11.3	0.3	16.9	27.8	3.0	1.4	0.0	42.4	57.6
Lejre	22.0	5.4	9.0	11.7	0.5	14.3	31.7	3.6	1.9	0.0	41.0	59.0
Greve	21.9	3.6	9.4	8.2	0.4	17.6	34.7	3.2	1.0	0.0	34.7	65.3
Solrød	19.6	3.7	10.5	8.6	0.2	15.4	37.3	3.6	1.0	0.0	33.0	67.0
Roskilde	23.4	6.2	10.7	14.0	0.5	12.5	26.1	3.9	2.7	0.0	46.3	53.7
Holbæk	25.5	5.3	8.8	12.6	0.5	15.2	27.4	3.0	1.8	0.0	45.1	54.9
Kalundborg	24.5	3.9	6.5	12.1	0.4	21.4	27.8	2.2	1.3	0.0	41.8	58.2
Odsherred	24.7	4.2	6.7	13.2	0.2	18.5	28.0	2.7	1.8	0.0	43.8	56.2
Ringsted	25.9	4.1	8.3	11.6	0.3	16.8	28.3	3.2	1.5	0.0	43.0	57.0
Sorø	24.3	4.2	8.9	11.9	0.7	16.4	28.9	3.0	1.6	0.0	42.0	58.0
Slagelse	26.0	2.9	7.6	12.0	0.4	19.9	27.5	2.4	1.3	0.0	42.3	57.7
Helsingør	25.3	6.9	11.7	12.9	0.4	13.7	22.6	4.1	2.5	0.0	47.5	52.5
Fredensborg	19.3	7.9	14.6	10.5	0.4	12.0	28.6	4.8	2.0	0.0	39.6	60.4
Hørsholm	11.7	7.3	24.2	4.7	0.2	9.5	35.7	5.6	1.0	0.0	24.7	75.3
Hillerød	24.3	6.9	12.7	11.3	1.0	11.3	25.8	3.9	2.6	0.0	45.2	54.8
Gribskov	19.7	5.6	9.5	11.0	1.1	16.2	31.5	3.6	1.7	0.0	38.1	61.9
Frederikssund	24.9	4.9	10.7	11.2	0.3	16.0	27.3	3.2	1.6	0.0	42.6	57.4
Halsnæs	27.2	4.7	7.5	12.4	0.7	18.0	24.4	2.8	2.2	0.0	46.6	53.4
Egedal	21.3	5.9	14.1	9.5	0.4	13.8	29.8	3.8	1.4	0.0	38.0	62.0
Furesø	19.4	9.4	15.4	13.5	0.4	10.1	23.9	5.2	2.7	0.0	45.0	55.0
Rudersdal	13.4	10.2	18.2	8.7	0.3	7.7	33.4	6.0	2.1	0.0	34.4	65.6
Allerød	16.5	8.8	17.0	10.6	0.6	9.9	30.5	4.7	1.4	0.0	37.3	62.7
Gentofte	13.7	8.0	27.8	8.9	0.4	7.9	25.5	5.5	2.4	0.0	32.9	67.1
Lyngby-Taarbæk	20.3	8.9	18.8	12.1	0.5	9.8	22.5	4.8	2.3	0.0	43.7	56.3
Gladsaxe	27.7	6.7	10.7	15.6	0.5	13.3	18.4	3.6	3.4	0.0	53.4	46.6
Rødovre	33.4	4.5	8.6	14.7	0.5	17.0	16.5	2.3	2.5	0.0	55.1	44.9
Herlev	32.8	4.4	10.2	14.6	1.1	15.7	16.3	2.4	2.5	0.0	54.2	45.8
Hvidovre	30.8	4.2	8.2	14.7	0.5	18.9	17.3	2.6	2.8	0.0	52.5	47.5
Brøndby	33.6	3.6	7.3	15.0	0.5	18.7	16.5	2.4	2.4	0.0	54.7	45.3
Ishøj	32.6	3.3	6.9	14.1	0.4	20.1	18.0	2.4	2.3	0.0	52.2	47.7
Vallensbæk	23.7	4.4	20.7	8.4	0.4	15.8	22.7	2.9	1.1	0.0	37.5	62.5
Høje-Taastrup	28.5	4.2	11.6	11.6	0.4	16.7	22.4	2.9	1.6	0.0	45.9	54.1
Albertslund	31.9	4.6	6.8	21.5	0.4	14.7	12.6	2.2	5.3	0.0	63.3	36.7
Ballerup	36.2	3.9	9.3	12.5	0.4	16.3	16.9	2.5	2.0	0.0	54.6	45.4
Glostrup	31.3	3.7	10.2	11.9	0.4	18.1	20.2	2.4	1.7	0.0	48.7	51.3
Copenhagen	24.6	9.2	8.7	22.6	0.5	10.1	12.4	4.2	7.6	0.0	64.0	36.0
Frederiksberg	21.2	10.0	16.6	17.3	0.5	8.9	15.4	5.1	5.0	0.0	53.5	46.5
Tårnby	29.3	3.7	8.2	14.0	0.4	20.1	20.0	2.6	1.7	0.0	48.6	51.3
Dragør	19.0	5.6	17.9	9.5	0.3	14.8	27.7	3.7	1.4	0.0	35.6	64.4
Bornholm	35.4	2.2	6.0	11.8	2.0	12.0	26.3	2.2	1.9	0.1	51.4	48.6

== District Results ==
=== Bornholm ===
2007 Danish parliamentary election: Bornholm
Party	Votes	%	+/-	Seats	+/ –
Social Democrats (Socialdemokraterne) (A)	9,888	35.4%	+2.3%	1	±0
Liberals (Venstre) (V)	7,350	26.3%	-8.5%	1	±0
Socialist People's Party (Socialistisk Folkeparti) (F)	3,328	11.9%	+7.9%	0	±0
Conservative People's Party (Det Konservative Folkeparti) (C)	1,688	6.0%	+3.1%	0	±0
Danish People's Party (Dansk Folkeparti) (O)	640	2.3%	-7.6%	0	±0
Social Liberal Party (Det Radikale Venstre) (B)	618	2.2%	-1.9%	0	±0
New Alliance (Ny Alliance) (Y)	617	2.2%	N/A	0	N/A
Red-Green Alliance (Enhedslisten) (Ø)	541	1.9%	-2.5%	0	±0
Others	576	2.1%	-0.7%	0	±0
Total (Turnout: 85.1%)	27,967	100%	±0%	2	±0

==== Members Elected ====
1. Jeppe Kofod (Social Democrats)
2. Peter Juel-Jensen (Liberals)

=== Copenhagen City ===
2007 Danish parliamentary election: Copenhagen City
Party	Votes	%	+/-	Seats	+/ –
Social Democrats (Socialdemokraterne) (A)	97,903	24.2%	+0.5%	4	±0
Socialist People's Party (Socialistisk Folkeparti) (F)	84,843	21.0%	+11.2%	4	+3
Liberals (Venstre) (V)	55,311	13.7%	-3.4%	2	-1
Danish People's Party (Dansk Folkeparti) (O)	42,906	10.6%	-0.6%	2	±0
Conservative People's Party (Det Konservative Folkeparti) (C)	40,811	10.1%	+0.5%	1	±0
Social Liberal Party (Det Radikale Venstre) (B)	35,858	8.9%	-8.0%	1	-2
Red-Green Alliance (Enhedslisten) (Ø)	26,963	6.7%	-2.1%	1	±0
New Alliance (Ny Alliance) (Y)	17,223	4.3%	N/A	0	N/A
Others	2,169	0.5%	-1.2%	0	±0
Total (Turnout: 84.8%)	403,987	100%	±0%	15	±0

==== Members Elected ====
1. Yildiz Akdogan (Social Democrats)
2. Christine Antorini (Social Democrats)
3. Karen Hækkerup (Social Democrats)
4. Helle Thorning-Schmidt (Social Democrats)
5. Ida Auken (Socialist People's Party)
6. Özlem Cekic (Socialist People's Party)
7. Anne Grete Holmsgaard (Socialist People's Party)
8. Kamal Qureshi (Socialist People's Party)
9. Rikke Hvilshøj (Liberals)
10. Søren Pind (Liberals)
11. Martin Henriksen (Danish People's Party)
12. Peter Skaarup (Danish People's Party)
13. Per Stig Møller (Conservative People's Party)
14. Lone Dybkjær (Social Liberal Party)
15. Johanne Schmidt-Nielsen (Red-Green Alliance)

=== Copenhagen County ===
2007 Danish parliamentary election: Copenhagen County
Party	Votes	%	+/-	Seats	+/ –
Social Democrats (Socialdemokraterne) (A)	85,821	27.6%	+1.0%	4	±0
Liberals (Venstre) (V)	60,395	19.5%	-3.7%	2	-1
Danish People's Party (Dansk Folkeparti) (O)	45,440	14.6%	-0.6%	2	±0
Socialist People's Party (Socialistisk Folkeparti) (F)	41,235	13.3%	+6.9%	2	+2
Conservative People's Party (Det Konservative Folkeparti) (C)	40,897	13.2%	+0.5%	1	±0
Social Liberal Party (Det Radikale Venstre) (B)	17,075	5.5%	-4.0%	0	-1
New Alliance (Ny Alliance) (Y)	10,294	3.3%	N/A	0	N/A
Red-Green Alliance (Enhedslisten) (Ø)	7,832	2.5%	-1.4%	0	±0
Others	1,526	4.9%	+3.2%	0	±0
Total (Turnout: 88.4%)	310,515	100%	±0%	11	±0

==== Members Elected ====
1. Morten Bødskov (Social Democrats)
2. Mette Frederiksen (Social Democrats)
3. Sophie Hæstorp-Andersen (Social Democrats)
4. Mogens Lykketoft (Social Democrats)
5. Karen Ellemann (Liberals)
6. Bertel Haarder (Liberals)
7. Mikkel Dencker (Danish People's Party)
8. Søren Espersen (Danish People's Party)
9. Hanne Agersnap (Socialist People's Party)
10. Holger Nielsen (Socialist People's Party)
11. Connie Hedegaard (Conservative People's Party)

=== East Jutland ===
2007 Danish parliamentary election: East Jutland
Party	Votes	%	+/-	Seats	+/ –
Social Democrats (Socialdemokraterne) (A)	127,432	27.6%	-1.0%	6	±0
Liberals (Venstre) (V)	125,074	27.0%	-1.5%	5	-1
Socialist People's Party (Socialistisk Folkeparti) (F)	61,496	13.3%	+7.4%	2	+1
Danish People's Party (Dansk Folkeparti) (O)	56,218	12.2%	+0.7%	2	±0
Conservative People's Party (Det Konservative Folkeparti) (C)	40,068	8.7%	-0.6%	1	±0
Social Liberal Party (Det Radikale Venstre) (B)	24,921	5.4%	-3.9%	1	±0
New Alliance (Ny Alliance) (Y)	13,389	2.9%	N/A	0	N/A
Red-Green Alliance (Enhedslisten) (Ø)	9,887	2.1%	-1.4%	0	±0
Others	3,914	0.8%	-0.5%	0	±0
Total (Turnout: 87.3%)	462,399	100%	±0%	17	±0

==== Members Elected ====
1. Svend Auken (Social Democrats)
2. René Skau Björnsson (Social Democrats)
3. Kirsten Brosbøl (Social Democrats)
4. Torben Hansen (Social Democrats)
5. Leif Lahn Jensen (Social Democrats)
6. Henrik Dam Kristensen (Social Democrats)
7. Kim Andersen (Liberals)
8. Anne-Mette Winther Christiansen (Liberals)
9. Karen Jespersen (Liberals)
10. Troels Lund Poulsen (Liberals)
11. Eyvind Vesselbo (Liberals)
12. Eigil Andersen (Socialist People's Party)
13. Pernille Frahm (Socialist People's Party)
14. Morten Messerschmidt (Danish People's Party)
15. Hans Kristian Skibby (Danish People's Party)
16. Henriette Kjær (Conservative People's Party)
17. Morten Østergaard (Social Liberal Party)

=== Fyn ===
2007 Danish parliamentary election: Fyn
Party	Votes	%	+/-	Seats	+/ –
Social Democrats (Socialdemokraterne) (A)	83,395	26.9%	-2.0%	4	±0
Liberals (Venstre) (V)	66,198	21.4%	-1.8%	3	±0
Danish People's Party (Dansk Folkeparti) (O)	45,843	14.8%	+1.5%	2	±0
Socialist People's Party (Socialistisk Folkeparti) (F)	43,258	14.0%	+7.9%	2	+2
Conservative People's Party (Det Konservative Folkeparti) (C)	41,225	13.3%	-1.7%	1	-1
Social Liberal Party (Det Radikale Venstre) (B)	15,554	5.0%	-3.4%	0	-1
New Alliance (Ny Alliance) (Y)	7,476	2.4%	N/A	0	N/A
Red-Green Alliance (Enhedslisten) (Ø)	5,446	1.8%	-1.2%	0	±0
Others	1,263	0.4%	-0.8%	0	±0
Total (Turnout: 86.6%)	309,658	100%	±0%	12	±0

==== Members Elected ====
1. Poul Andersen (Social Democrats)
2. Carsten Hansen (Social Democrats)
3. Niels Sindal (Social Democrats)
4. Julie Skovsby (Social Democrats)
5. Erling Bonnesen (Liberals)
6. Britta Schall Holberg (Liberals)
7. Lars Christian Lilleholt (Liberals)
8. Kristian Thulesen Dahl (Danish People's Party)
9. Tina Petersen (Danish People's Party)
10. Anne Baastrup (Socialist People's Party)
11. Karsten Hønge (Socialist People's Party)
12. Bendt Bendtsen (Conservative People's Party)

=== North Jutland ===
2007 Danish parliamentary election: North Jutland
Party	Votes	%	+/-	Seats	+/ –
Social Democrats (Socialdemokraterne) (A)	108,236	29.3%	-1.0%	5	±0
Liberals (Venstre) (V)	94,030	25.5%	-3.8%	4	-1
Danish People's Party (Dansk Folkeparti) (O)	50,253	13.6%	+1.4%	2	±0
Conservative People's Party (Det Konservative Folkeparti) (C)	49,483	13.4%	+2.3%	2	±0
Socialist People's Party (Socialistisk Folkeparti) (F)	37,977	10.3%	+6.0%	2	+2
Social Liberal Party (Det Radikale Venstre) (B)	14,406	3.9%	-3.5%	0	-1
New Alliance (Ny Alliance) (Y)	6,582	1.8%	N/A	0	N/A
Red-Green Alliance (Enhedslisten) (Ø)	4,082	1.1%	-1.0%	0	±0
Others	3,944	1.1%	-0.1%	0	±0
Total (Turnout: 85.3%)	368,993	100%	±0%	15	±0

==== Members Elected ====
1. Ole Vagn Christensen (Social Democrats)
2. Lene Hansen (Social Democrats)
3. Orla Hav (Social Democrats)
4. Bjarne Laustsen (Social Democrats)
5. Rasmus Prehn (Social Democrats)
6. Birgitte Josefsen (Liberals)
7. Karsten Lauritzen (Liberals)
8. Tina Nedergaard (Liberals)
9. Torsten Schack Pedersen (Liberals)
10. Bent Bøgsted (Danish People's Party)
11. Anita Knakkergaard (Danish People's Party)
12. Lene Espersen (Conservative People's Party)
13. Jakob Axel Nielsen (Conservative People's Party)
14. Pernille Vigsø Bagge (Socialist People's Party)
15. Karl Bornhøft (Socialist People's Party)

=== North Zealand ===
2007 Danish parliamentary election: North Zealand
Party	Votes	%	+/-	Seats	+/ –
Liberals (Venstre) (V)	78,834	28.2%	-3.8%	4	±0
Social Democrats (Socialdemokraterne) (A)	57,861	20.7%	+1.4%	2	±0
Conservative People's Party (Det Konservative Folkeparti) (C)	38,667	13.4%	+0.4%	1	-1
Danish People's Party (Dansk Folkeparti) (O)	35,252	12.6%	-0.2%	1	±0
Socialist People's Party (Socialistisk Folkeparti) (F)	30,142	10.8%	+5.5%	1	+1
Social Liberal Party (Det Radikale Venstre) (B)	20,031	7.1%	-4.5%	1	±0
New Alliance (Ny Alliance) (Y)	12,107	4.3%	N/A	0	N/A
Red-Green Alliance (Enhedslisten) (Ø)	5,612	2.0%	-1.0%	0	±0
Others	1,457	0.5%	-0.8%	0	±0
Total (Turnout: 89.0%)	279,963	100%	±0%	10	±0

==== Members Elected ====
1. Claus Hjort Frederiksen (Liberals)
2. Sophie Løhde (Liberals)
3. Lars Løkke Rasmussen (Liberals)
4. Thor Pedersen (Liberals)
5. Nick Hækkerup (Social Democrats)
6. Lone Møller (Social Democrats)
7. Pia Christmas-Møller (Conservative People's Party)
8. Pia Adelsteen (Danish People's Party)
9. Pia Olsen Dyhr (Socialist People's Party)
10. Margrethe Vestager (Social Liberal Party)

=== South Jutland ===
2007 Danish parliamentary election: North Zealand
Party	Votes	%	+/-	Seats	+/ –
Liberals (Venstre) (V)	153,688	34.6%	-2.1%	7	±0
Social Democrats (Socialdemokraterne) (A)	101,557	22.9%	-1.2%	5	±0
Danish People's Party (Dansk Folkeparti) (O)	69,762	15.7%	+0.8%	3	±0
Socialist People's Party (Socialistisk Folkeparti) (F)	50,484	11.4%	+6.3%	2	+1
Conservative People's Party (Det Konservative Folkeparti) (C)	37,055	8.3%	+0.3%	1	±0
Social Liberal Party (Det Radikale Venstre) (B)	15,201	3.4%	-2.7%	0	-1
New Alliance (Ny Alliance) (Y)	8,481	1.9%	N/A	0	N/A
Red-Green Alliance (Enhedslisten) (Ø)	3,626	0.8%	-0.9%	0	±0
Others	4,325	1.0%	-0.1%	0	±0
Total (Turnout: 85.9%)	444,179	100%	±0%	18	±0

==== Members Elected ====
1. Eva Kjer Hansen (Liberals)
2. Ellen Trane Nørby (Liberals)
3. Preben Rudiengaard (Liberals)
4. Hans Christian Schmidt (Liberals)
5. Hans Christian Thoning (Liberals)
6. Ulla Tørnæs (Liberals)
7. Jens Vibjerg (Liberals)
8. Benny Engelbrecht (Social Democrats)
9. Karen Klint (Social Democrats)
10. Kim Mortensen (Social Democrats)
11. Julie Rademacher (Social Democrats)
12. Lise von Seelen (Social Democrats)
13. Mogens Camre (Danish People's Party)
14. Jørn Dohrmann (Danish People's Party)
15. Søren Krarup (Danish People's Party)
16. Jesper Petersen (Socialist People's Party)
17. Villy Søvndal (Socialist People's Party)
18. Carina Christensen (Conservative People's Party)

=== West Jutland ===
2007 Danish parliamentary election: North Zealand
Party	Votes	%	+/-	Seats	+/ –
Liberals (Venstre) (V)	121,292	37.3%	-1.9%	6	±0
Social Democrats (Socialdemokraterne) (A)	74,664	23.0%	+0.4%	4	±0
Danish People's Party (Dansk Folkeparti) (O)	42,357	13.0%	+0.5%	2	±0
Socialist People's Party (Socialistisk Folkeparti) (F)	30,642	9.4%	+4.6%	1	+1
Conservative People's Party (Det Konservative Folkeparti) (C)	24,917	7.7%	+0.1%	1	±0
Social Liberal Party (Det Radikale Venstre) (B)	12,776	3.9%	-2.6%	0	-1
New Alliance (Ny Alliance) (Y)	6,725	2.1%	N/A	0	N/A
Red-Green Alliance (Enhedslisten) (Ø)	2,677	0.8%	-0.8%	0	±0
Others	9,273	2.9%	-0.6%	0	±0
Total (Turnout: 87.3%)	325,323	100%	±0%	14	±0

==== Members Elected ====
1. Søren Gade (Liberals)
2. Kristian Jensen (Liberals)
3. Jens Kirk (Liberals)
4. Kristian Pihl Lorentzen (Liberals)
5. Helge Sander (Liberals)
6. Inger Støjberg (Liberals)
7. Mogens Jensen (Social Democrats)
8. Thomas Jensen (Social Democrats)
9. Jens Christian Lund (Social Democrats)
10. Jens Peter Vernersen (Social Democrats)
11. Christian Hansen (Danish People's Party)
12. Jesper Langballe (Danish People's Party)
13. Steen Gade (Socialist People's Party)
14. Per Ørum Jørgensen (Conservative People's Party)

=== Zealand ===
2007 Danish parliamentary election: Zealand
Party	Votes	%	+/-	Seats	+/ –
Liberals (Venstre) (V)	146,300	27.8%	-2.6%	6	-1
Social Democrats (Socialdemokraterne) (A)	134,280	25.5%	-0.7%	6	±0
Danish People's Party (Dansk Folkeparti) (O)	88,140	16.8%	+1.3%	4	±0
Conservative People's Party (Det Konservative Folkeparti) (C)	38,667	13.48%	+0.4%	1	-1
Socialist People's Party (Socialistisk Folkeparti) (F)	30,142	10.8%	+5.5%	1	+1
Social Liberal Party (Det Radikale Venstre) (B)	20,031	7.1%	-4.5%	1	±0
New Alliance (Ny Alliance) (Y)	12,107	4.3%	N/A	0	N/A
Red-Green Alliance (Enhedslisten) (Ø)	5,612	2.0%	-1.0%	0	±0
Others	1,457	0.5%	-0.8%	0	±0
Total (Turnout: 89.0%)	279,963	100%	±0%	10	±0

==== Members Elected ====
1. Claus Hjort Frederiksen (Liberals)
2. Sophie Løhde (Liberals)
3. Lars Løkke Rasmussen (Liberals)
4. Thor Pedersen (Liberals)
5. Nick Hækkerup (Social Democrats)
6. Lone Møller (Social Democrats)
7. Pia Christmas-Møller (Conservative People's Party)
8. Pia Adelsteen (Danish People's Party)
9. Pia Olsen Dyhr (Socialist People's Party)
10. Margrethe Vestager (Social Liberal Party)

== Regional Results ==
=== Capital City Region ===
2007 Danish parliamentary election: Capital City Region
Party	Votes	%	+/-	Seats
Social Democrats (Socialdemokraterne) (A)	251,473	24.6%	+1.0%	1
Liberals (Venstre) (V)	201,890	19.8%	-3.7%	1
Socialist People's Party (Socialistisk Folkeparti) (F)	159,548	15.6%	+8.2%	1
Danish People's Party (Dansk Folkeparti) (O)	126,959	12.4%	-0.4%	1
Conservative People's Party (Det Konservative Folkeparti) (C)	122,063	11.9%	+0.5%	3
Social Liberal Party (Det Radikale Venstre) (B)	73,582	7.2%	-5.7%	1
Red-Green Alliance (Enhedslisten) (Ø)	40,948	4.0%	-1.6%	1
New Alliance (Ny Alliance) (Y)	40,241	3.9%	N/A	2
Others	5,728	0.5%	-0.2%	0
Total (Turnout: 86.7%)	1,022,432	100%	±0%	11

==== Members Elected ====
1. Klaus Hækkerup (Social Democrats)
2. Gitte Lillelund Bech (Liberals)
3. Nanna Westerby (Socialist People's Party)
4. Marlene Harpsøe (Danish People's Party)
5. Lars Barfoed (Conservative People's Party)
6. Charlotte Dyremose (Conservative People's Party)
7. Helle Sjelle (Conservative People's Party)
8. Morten Helveg Petersen (Social Liberal Party)
9. Frank Aaen (Red-Green Alliance)
10. Malou Aamund (New Alliance)
11. Naser Khader (New Alliance)

=== Zealand-South Denmark Region ===
2007 Danish parliamentary election: Zealand-South Denmark Region
Party	Votes	%	+/-	Seats
Liberals (Venstre) (V)	366,186	28.6%	-2.2%	3
Social Democrats (Socialdemokraterne) (A)	319,232	24.9%	-1.2%	1
Danish People's Party (Dansk Folkeparti) (O)	203,745	15.9%	+1.2%	2
Socialist People's Party (Socialistisk Folkeparti) (F)	161,312	12.6%	+6.9%	1
Conservative People's Party (Det Konservative Folkeparti) (C)	122,873	9.6%	-0.6%	2
Social Liberal Party (Det Radikale Venstre) (B)	51,476	4.0%	-3.3%	3
New Alliance (Ny Alliance) (Y)	30,358	2.4%	N/A	2
Red-Green Alliance (Enhedslisten) (Ø)	17,388	1.4%	-1.1%	1
Others	7,703	0.6%	-0.8%	0
Total (Turnout: 86.4%)	1,280,273	100%	±0%	15

==== Members Elected ====
1. Peter Christensen (Liberals)
2. Louise Schack Elholm (Liberals)
3. Flemming Damgaard Larsen (Liberals)
4. Lennart Damsbo-Andersen (Social Democrats)
5. Liselott Blixt (Danish People's Party)
6. Karin Nødgaard (Danish People's Party)
7. Karina Lorentzen (Socialist People's Party)
8. Vivi Kier (Conservative People's Party)
9. Mike Legarth (Conservative People's Party)
10. Simon Emil Ammitzbøll (Social Liberal Party)
11. Bente Dahl (Social Liberal Party)
12. Niels Helveg Petersen (Social Liberal Party)
13. Jørgen Poulsen (New Alliance)
14. Gitte Seeberg (New Alliance)
15. Line Barfod (Red-Green Alliance)

=== Mid and North Jutland Region ===
2007 Danish parliamentary election: Zealand-South Denmark Region
Party	Votes	%	+/-	Seats
Liberals (Venstre) (V)	340,396	29.4%	-2.5%	2
Social Democrats (Socialdemokraterne) (A)	310,332	26.8%	-0.7%	2
Danish People's Party (Dansk Folkeparti) (O)	148,828	12.9%	+0.9%	2
Socialist People's Party (Socialistisk Folkeparti) (F)	130,115	11.3%	+6.2%	2
Conservative People's Party (Det Konservative Folkeparti) (C)	114,468	9.9%	+0.5%	2
Social Liberal Party (Det Radikale Venstre) (B)	52,103	4.5%	-3.5%	2
New Alliance (Ny Alliance) (Y)	26,696	2.3%	N/A	1
Red-Green Alliance (Enhedslisten) (Ø)	16,646	1.4%	-1.1%	1
Others	17,131	1.5%	+0.3%	0
Total (Turnout: 86.7%)	1,156,715	100%	±0%	14

==== Members Elected ====
1. Anders Broholm (Liberals)
2. Eyvind Vesselbo (Liberals)
3. Anne-Marie Meldgaard (Social Democrats)
4. Flemming Møller Mortensen (Social Democrats)
5. Kim Christiansen (Danish People's Party)
6. Ib Poulsen (Danish People's Party)
7. Jonas Dahl (Socialist People's Party)
8. Kristen Touborg (Socialist People's Party)
9. Tom Behnke (Conservative People's Party)
10. Knud Vældgaard Kristensen (Conservative People's Party)
11. Marianne Jelved (Social Liberal Party)
12. Johannes Poulsen (Social Liberal Party)
13. Anders Samuelsen (New Alliance)
14. Per Clausen (Red-Green Alliance)

== Sources ==
- psephos.adamcarr.net Psephos - Adam Carr's Election Archive
- dst.dk Danmarks Statistik (in Danish)
