= List of members of the Folketing, 2011–2015 =

68th Folketing
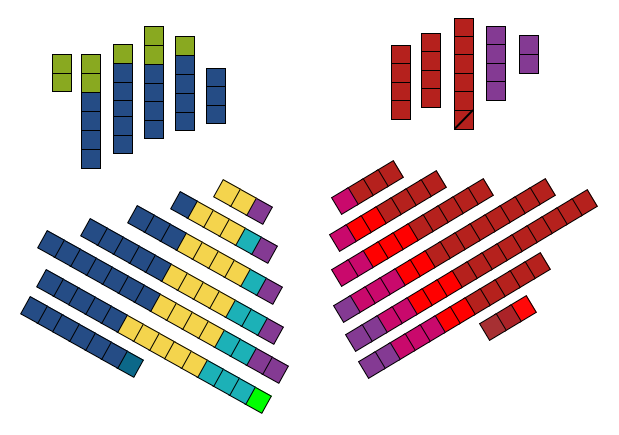
- Term: 15 September 2011 — 18 June 2015
- Speaker: A Mogens Lykketoft
- Prime Minister: A Helle Thorning-Schmidt
- Cabinet: Thorning-Schmidt I Thorning-Schmidt II
- Previous: 2007-2011
- Next: 2015-2019

This is a list of the 179 members of the Folketing, in the 2011 to 2015 session. They were elected at the 2011 general election.

== Election results ==
Party	Votes	%	Seats	+/–
Denmark proper
Venstre	947,725	26.7	47	+1
Social Democrats (A)	879,615	24.8	44	−1
Danish People's Party (O)	436,726	12.3	22	−3
Danish Social Liberal Party (B)	336,698	9.5	17	+8
Socialist People's Party (F)	326,192	9.2	16	−7
Red-Green Alliance (Ø)	236,860	6.7	12	+8
Liberal Alliance (I)	176,585	5.0	9	+4
Conservative People's Party (C)	175,047	4.9	8	−10
Christian Democrats (K)	28,070	0.8	0	0
Independents	1,850	0.1	0	0
Invalid/blank votes	34,307	–	–	–
Total	3,545,368	100	175	0
Registered voters/turnout	4,079,910	87.7	–	–
Faroe Islands
Union Party (B)	6,361	30.8	1	0
Social Democratic Party (C)	4,328	21.0	1	+1
Republic (E)	3,998	19.4	0	−1
People's Party (A)	3,932	19.0	0	0
Centre Party (H)	872	4.2	0	0
Self-Government Party (D)	481	2.3	0	0
Independents	672	3.3	0	0
Invalid/blank votes	301	–	–	–
Total	20,644	100	2	0
Registered voters/turnout	35,044	58.9	–	–
Greenland
Inuit Ataqatigiit	9,780	42.7	1	0
Siumut	8,499	37.1	1	0
Democrats	2,882	12.6	0	0
Atassut	1,728	7.5	0	0
Independents	24	0.1	0	0
Invalid/blank votes	612	–	–	–
Total	22,913	100	2	0
Registered voters/turnout	40,935	57.4	–	–

== Seat distribution ==
Below is the distribution of the 179 seats as it appeared after the 2011 election, as well at the distribution at the end of the term

Party	Party leader	Elected seats	End seats	Change
A Social Democrats	Helle Thorning-Schmidt	44	47	▲3
B Social Liberal Party	Morten Østergaard	17	17	Steady
C Conservatives	Søren Pape Poulsen	8	8	Steady
F Socialist People's Party	Pia Olsen Dyhr	16	12	▼4
I Liberal Alliance	Anders Samuelsen	9	9	Steady
O Danish People's Party	Kristian Thulesen Dahl	22	22	Steady
V Liberals	Lars Løkke Rasmussen	47	47	Steady
Ø Red-Green Alliance	Johanne Schmidt-Nielsen (Note: Formally, the Red-Green Alliance have collective leadership, but Schmidt-Nielsen was their political spokesperson, and de facto leader of the party.)	12	12	Steady
Å The Alternative	Uffe Elbæk	-	1	▲1
JF Social Democratic Party	Aksel V. Johannesen	1	1	Steady
SP Union Party	Kaj Leo Johannesen	1	1	Steady
IA Community of the People	Aaja Chemnitz	1	1	Steady
SI Forward	Aleqa Hammond	1	1	Steady

== Parliament members elected at the September 2011 election ==
Name	Birth year	Party	Constituency
Pia Adelsteen	1963	O Danish People's Party	North Zealand
Karina Adsbøl	1976	O Danish People's Party	South Jutland
Alex Ahrendtsen	1967	O Danish People's Party	Funen
Simon Emil Ammitzbøll-Bille	1977	I Liberal Alliance	Copenhagen
Eigil Andersen	1953	F Socialist People's Party	East Jutland
Hans Andersen	1974	V Liberals	North Zealand
Kim Andersen	1957	V Liberals	East Jutland
Liv Holm Andersen	1987	B Social Liberal Party	East Jutland
Sophie Hæstorp Andersen	1974	A Social Democrats	Greater Copenhagen
Christine Antorini	1965	A Social Democrats	North Zealand
Jørgen Arbo-Bæhr	1955	Ø Red-Green Alliance	North Zealand
Ida Auken	1978	F Socialist People's Party	Copenhagen
Christian Friis Bach	1966	B Social Liberal Party	North Zealand
Pernille Vigsø Bagge	1975	F Socialist People's Party	North Jutland
Lars Barfoed	1957	C Conservatives	North Zealand
Lisbeth Bech-Nielsen	1982	F Socialist People's Party	North Jutland
Gitte Lillelund Bech	1969	V Liberals	Greater Copenhagen
Tom Behnke	1966	C Conservatives	East Jutland
Jacob Bjerregaard	1977	A Social Democrats	South Jutland
Liselott Blixt	1965	O Danish People's Party	Zealand
Mette Bock	1957	I Liberal Alliance	South Jutland
Erling Bonnesen	1955	V Liberals	Funen
Trine Bramsen	1981	A Social Democrats	Funen
Stine Brix	1982	Ø Red-Green Alliance	North Jutland
Kirsten Brosbøl	1977	A Social Democrats	East Jutland
Morten Bødskov	1970	A Social Democrats	Greater Copenhagen
Bent Bøgsted	1956	O Danish People's Party	North Jutland
Anne Baastrup	1952	F Socialist People's Party	Funen
Özlem Sara Cekic	1976	F Socialist People's Party	Copenhagen
Peter Christensen	1975	V Liberals	South Jutland
René Christensen	1970	O Danish People's Party	Zealand
Villum Christensen	1954	I Liberal Alliance	Zealand
Anne-Mette Winther Christiansen	1966	V Liberals	East Jutland
Kim Christiansen	1956	O Danish People's Party	East Jutland
Per Clausen	1955	Ø Red-Green Alliance	East Jutland
Bjarne Corydon	1973	A Social Democrats	South Jutland
Jens Henrik Thulesen Dahl	1961	O Danish People's Party	Funen
Jonas Dahl	1978	F Socialist People's Party	East Jutland
Kristian Thulesen Dahl	1969	O Danish People's Party	South Jutland
Lennart Damsbo-Andersen	1956	A Social Democrats	Zealand
Thomas Danielsen	1983	V Liberals	West Jutland
Karina Lorentzen Dehnhardt	1973	F Socialist People's Party	South Jutland
Mette Hjermind Dencker	1978	O Danish People's Party	East Jutland
Mikkel Dencker	1975	O Danish People's Party	Greater Copenhagen
Lars Dohn	1950	Ø Red-Green Alliance	West Jutland
Jørn Dohrmann	1969	O Danish People's Party	South Jutland
Pia Olsen Dyhr	1971	F Socialist People's Party	North Zealand
Uffe Elbæk	1954	B Social Liberal Party	Copenhagen
Louise Schack Elholm	1977	V Liberals	Zealand
Jakob Ellemann-Jensen	1973	V Liberals	Funen
Karen Ellemann	1969	V Liberals	Greater Copenhagen
Benny Engelbrecht	1970	A Social Democrats	South Jutland
Lene Espersen	1965	C Conservatives	North Jutland
Søren Espersen	1953	O Danish People's Party	Greater Copenhagen
Nadeem Farooq	1976	B Social Liberal Party	Greater Copenhagen
Dennis Flydtkjær	1978	O Danish People's Party	West Jutland
Thyra Frank	1952	I Liberal Alliance	North Jutland
Claus Hjort Frederiksen	1947	V Liberals	North Zealand
Mette Frederiksen	1977	A Social Democrats	Greater Copenhagen
Lykke Friis	1969	V Liberals	East Jutland
Steen Gade	1945	F Socialist People's Party	South Jutland
Martin Geertsen	1970	V Liberals	Copenhagen
Mette Gjerskov	1966	A Social Democrats	Zealand
Karin Gaardsted	1955	A Social Democrats	West Jutland
Ane Halsboe-Jørgensen	1983	A Social Democrats	North Jutland
Carsten Hansen	1957	A Social Democrats	Funen
Eva Kjer Hansen	1964	V Liberals	South Jutland
Marlene Borst Hansen	1974	B Social Liberal Party	South Jutland
Torben Hansen	1965	A Social Democrats	East Jutland
Orla Hav	1952	A Social Democrats	North Jutland
Jane Heitmann	1968	V Liberals	Funen
Martin Henriksen	1980	O Danish People's Party	Copenhagen
Preben Bang Henriksen	1954	V Liberals	North Jutland
Camilla Hersom	1971	B Social Liberal Party	Funen
Magnus Heunicke	1975	A Social Democrats	Zealand
Birthe Rønn Hornbech	1943	V Liberals	Zealand
Henning Hyllested	1954	Ø Red-Green Alliance	South Jutland
Karen Hækkerup	1974	A Social Democrats	Copenhagen
Nick Hækkerup	1968	A Social Democrats	North Zealand
Ole Hækkerup	1971	A Social Democrats	Zealand
Henrik Høegh	1952	V Liberals	Zealand
Bertel Haarder	1944	V Liberals	Zealand
Doris Jakobsen	1978	SI Forward	Greenland
Marianne Jelved	1943	B Social Liberal Party	North Jutland
Jacob Jensen	1973	V Liberals	Zealand
Kristian Jensen	1971	V Liberals	West Jutland
Leif Lahn Jensen	1967	A Social Democrats	East Jutland
Michael Aastrup Jensen	1976	V Liberals	East Jutland
Mogens Jensen	1963	A Social Democrats	West Jutland
Thomas Jensen	1970	A Social Democrats	West Jutland
Karen Jespersen	1947	V Liberals	East Jutland
Jens Joel	1978	A Social Democrats	East Jutland
Edmund Joensen	1944	SP Union Party	Faroe Islands
Jan Johansen	1955	A Social Democrats	Funen
Birgitte Josefsen	1951	V Liberals	North Jutland
Peter Juel-Jensen	1966	V Liberals	Bornholm
Christian Juhl	1953	Ø Red-Green Alliance	Zealand
Jan E. Jørgensen	1965	V Liberals	Copenhagen
Benedikte Kiær	1969	C Conservatives	Greater Copenhagen
Pia Kjærsgaard	1947	O Danish People's Party	Zealand
Karen J. Klint	1947	A Social Democrats	South Jutland
Jeppe Kofod	1974	A Social Democrats	Bornholm
Simon Kollerup	1986	A Social Democrats	North Jutland
Astrid Krag	1982	F Socialist People's Party	Zealand
Marie Krarup	1965	O Danish People's Party	South Jutland
Henrik Dam Kristensen	1957	A Social Democrats	East Jutland
Christian Langballe	1967	O Danish People's Party	West Jutland
Rasmus Horn Langhoff	1980	A Social Democrats	Zealand
Esben Lunde Larsen	1978	V Liberals	West Jutland
Flemming Damgaard Larsen	1951	V Liberals	Zealand
Henrik Sass Larsen	1966	A Social Democrats	Zealand
Karsten Lauritzen	1983	V Liberals	North Jutland
Bjarne Laustsen	1953	A Social Democrats	North Jutland
Mike Legarth	1960	C Conservatives	South Jutland
Lars Christian Lilleholt	1965	V Liberals	Funen
Annette Lind	1969	A Social Democrats	West Jutland
Lone Loklindt	1960	B Social Liberal Party	Copenhagen
Kristian Pihl Lorentzen	1961	V Liberals	West Jutland
Rosa Lund	1986	Ø Red-Green Alliance	Copenhagen
Mogens Lykketoft	1946	A Social Democrats	Greater Copenhagen
Sophie Løhde	1983	V Liberals	North Zealand
Morten Marinus	1977	O Danish People's Party	North Jutland
Anni Matthiesen	1964	V Liberals	South Jutland
Mai Mercado	1980	C Conservatives	Funen
Brian Mikkelsen	1966	C Conservatives	Zealand
Jeppe Mikkelsen	1991	B Social Liberal Party	East Jutland
Leif Mikkelsen	1945	I Liberal Alliance	West Jutland
Flemming Møller Mortensen	1963	A Social Democrats	North Jutland
Per Stig Møller	1942	C Conservatives	Copenhagen
Tina Nedergaard	1969	V Liberals	North Jutland
Holger K. Nielsen	1950	F Socialist People's Party	Greater Copenhagen
Sofie Carsten Nielsen	1975	B Social Liberal Party	Greater Copenhagen
Karsten Nonbo	1952	V Liberals	Zealand
Karin Nødgaard	1966	O Danish People's Party	Zealand
Ellen Trane Nørby	1980	V Liberals	South Jutland
Ole Birk Olesen	1972	I Liberal Alliance	East Jutland
Joachim B. Olsen	1977	I Liberal Alliance	Greater Copenhagen
Sara Olsvig	1978	IA Community of the People	Greenland
Maja Panduro	1982	A Social Democrats	East Jutland
John Dyrby Paulsen	1963	A Social Democrats	Zealand
Torsten Schack Pedersen	1976	V Liberals	North Jutland
Jesper Petersen	1981	F Socialist People's Party	South Jutland
Rasmus Helveg Petersen	1968	B Social Liberal Party	Zealand
Søren Pind	1969	V Liberals	Copenhagen
Troels Lund Poulsen	1976	V Liberals	East Jutland
Rasmus Prehn	1973	A Social Democrats	North Jutland
Lars Løkke Rasmussen	1964	V Liberals	North Zealand
Troels Ravn	1961	A Social Democrats	South Jutland
Mette Reissmann	1963	A Social Democrats	Copenhagen
Merete Riisager	1976	I Liberal Alliance	Funen
Lotte Rod	1985	B Social Liberal Party	South Jutland
Pernille Rosenkrantz-Theil	1977	A Social Democrats	Funen
Mads Rørvig	1985	V Liberals	West Jutland
Anders Samuelsen	1967	I Liberal Alliance	North Zealand
Manu Sareen	1967	B Social Liberal Party	Copenhagen
Johanne Schmidt-Nielsen	1984	Ø Red-Green Alliance	Copenhagen
Hans Christian Schmidt	1953	V Liberals	South Jutland
Hans Kristian Skibby	1969	O Danish People's Party	East Jutland
Pernille Skipper	1984	Ø Red-Green Alliance	Funen
Julie Skovsby	1978	A Social Democrats	Funen
Sjúrður Skaale	1967	JF Social Democratic Party	Faroe Islands
Peter Skaarup	1964	O Danish People's Party	Copenhagen
Ole Sohn	1954	F Socialist People's Party	Zealand
Zenia Stampe	1979	B Social Liberal Party	Zealand
Andreas Steenberg	1983	B Social Liberal Party	West Jutland
Inger Støjberg	1973	V Liberals	West Jutland
Finn Sørensen	1946	Ø Red-Green Alliance	Copenhagen
Villy Søvndal	1952	F Socialist People's Party	Copenhagen
Hans Christian Thoning	1952	V Liberals	South Jutland
Helle Thorning-Schmidt	1966	A Social Democrats	Copenhagen
Ulla Tørnæs	1962	V Liberals	South Jutland
Eyvind Vesselbo	1946	V Liberals	Greater Copenhagen
Margrethe Vestager	1968	B Social Liberal Party	North Zealand
Annette Vilhelmsen	1959	F Socialist People's Party	Funen
Nikolaj Villumsen	1983	Ø Red-Green Alliance	Zealand
Nicolai Wammen	1971	A Social Democrats	East Jutland
Fatma Øktem	1973	V Liberals	East Jutland
Morten Østergaard	1976	B Social Liberal Party	East Jutland
Frank Aaen	1951	Ø Red-Green Alliance	Greater Copenhagen

== Party and member changes after the September 2011 elections ==
=== Party changes ===
Below are all parliament members that have joined another party or become independent during the term.

Name	Old party	Constituency	New party	Date
Jesper Petersen	F Socialist People's Party	South Jutland	A Social Democrats	21 March 2013
Uffe Elbæk	B Social Liberal Party	Copenhagen	. Independent	17 September 2013
Uffe Elbæk	.' Independent	Copenhagen	Å The Alternative	13 March 2015
Ida Auken	F Socialist People's Party	Copenhagen	A Social Democrats	4 February 2014
Astrid Krag	F Socialist People's Party	Zealand	A Social Democrats	4 February 2014
Ole Sohn	F Socialist People's Party	Zealand	A Social Democrats	4 February 2014

=== Lasting member changes ===
Below are member changes that lasted through the entire term.

Replacement	Birth year	Party	Constituency	Replaced MP	Date	Reason
Finn Thranum	1956	V Liberals	East Jutland	Lykke Friis	1 June 2013	Friis resigned her seat.
Jakob Engel-Schmidt	1983	V Liberals	Greater Copenhagen	Gitte Lillelund Bech	3 March 2013	Bech resigned her seat.
Trine Mach	1969	F Socialist People's Party	Copenhagen	Villy Søvndal	21 December 2013	Søvndal resigned his seat.
Jeppe Bruus	1978	A Social Democrats	Greater Copenhagen	Sophie Hæstorp Andersen	1 January 2014	Andersen resigned her seat to become chairman of the Capital Region.
Charlotte Dyremose	1977	C Conservatives	Greater Copenhagen	Benedikte Kiær	1 Januar 2014	Kiær resigned her seat to become mayor of Helsingør Municipality.
Anne Sina	1987	A Social Democrats	South Jutland	Jacob Bjerregaard	1 Januar 2014	Bjerregaard resigned his seat to become mayor of Fredericia Municipality.
Anita Christensen	1973	O Danish People's Party	South Jutland	Jørn Dohrmann	21 June 2014	Dohrmann resigned his seat to enter the European Parliament.
Jacob Lund	1965	A Social Democrats	Bornholm	Jeppe Kofod	1 July 2014	Kofod resigned his seat to enter the European Parliament.
Jens E. Christensen	1968	V Liberals	South Jutland	Ulla Tørnæs	1 July 2014	Tørnæs resigned her seat to enter the European Parliament.
Helle Løvgreen Mølvig	1963	B Social Liberal Party	North Zealand	Christian Friis Bach	1 August 2014	Bach resigned his seat.
Yildiz Akdogan	1973	A Social Democrats	Copenhagen	Karen Hækkerup	21 October 2014	Hækkerup resigned her seat.
Helge Vagn Jacobsen	1963	B Social Liberal Party	North Zealand	Margrethe Vestager	3 November 2014	Vestager resigned her seat.
Daniel Rugholm	1982	C Conservatives	North Jutland	Lene Espersen	11 November 2014	Espersen resigned her seat.

=== Temporary member changes ===
Below are temporary member replacements during the term.

Replacement	Birth year	Party	Constituency	Replaced MP	Start	End	Length
Marie-Louise Andreassen	1971	B Social Liberal Party	Greater Copenhagen	Nadeem Farooq	27 October 2011	17 November 2011	21 days
René Skau Björnsson	1967	A Social Democrats	East Jutland	Maja Panduro	27 October 2011	17 November 2011	21 days
Ida Damborg	1969	F Socialist People's Party	South Jutland	Karina Lorentzen Dehnhardt	27 October 2011	15 April 2012	171 days
Merete Dea Larsen	1978	O Danish People's Party	Zealand	Pia Kjærsgaard	27 October 2011	17 November 2011	21 days
Anne Sina	1987	A Social Democrats	South Jutland	Karen J. Klint	27 October 2011	17 November 2011	21 days
Jacob Lund	1965	A Social Democrats	Bornholm	Jeppe Kofod	29 November 2011	21 December 2011	22 days
Finn Thranum	1956	V Liberals	East Jutland	Troels Lund Poulsen	6 December 2011	11 March 2012	96 days
Meta Fuglsang	1960	F Socialist People's Party	Zealand	Astrid Krag	17 January 2012	9 April 2012	83 days
Poul Andersen	1952	A Social Democrats	Funen	Julie Skovsby	31 January 2012	26 March 2012	55 days
Hans Vestager	1945	B Social Liberal Party	South Jutland	Marlene Borst Hansen	5 March 2012	30 November 2012	270 days
Aksel V. Johannesen	1972	JF Social Democratic Party	Faroe Islands	Sjúrður Skaale	20 April 2012	20 May 2012	30 days
Kisser Franciska Lehnert	1966	I Liberal Alliance	Zealand	Villum Christensen	2 October 2012	8 October 2012	6 days
Daniel Toft Jakobsen	1978	A Social Democrats	East Jutland	Kirsten Brosbøl	23 October 2012	1 December 2013	404 days
Linda Kristiansen	1977	B Social Liberal Party	Zealand	Zenia Stampe	23 October 2012	1 April 2013	160 days
Laura Lindahl	1983	I Liberal Alliance	Copenhagen	Simon Emil Ammitzbøll-Bille	23 October 2012	29 October 2012	6 days
René Skau Björnsson	1967	A Social Democrats	East Jutland	Leif Lahn Jensen	24 October 2012	9 November 2012	16 days
Karl H. Bornhøft	1949	F Socialist People's Party	North Jutland	Pernille Vigsø Bagge	24 October 2012	9 November 2012	16 days
Per Husted	1966	A Social Democrats	North Jutland	Rasmus Prehn	24 October 2012	9 November 2012	16 days
Merete Dea Larsen	1978	O Danish People's Party	Zealand	Pia Kjærsgaard	24 October 2012	9 November 2012	16 days
Anne Sina	1987	A Social Democrats	South Jutland	Troels Ravn	24 October 2012	9 November 2012	16 days
Helle Sjelle	1971	C Conservatives	Zealand	Brian Mikkelsen	24 October 2012	9 November 2012	16 days
Pernille Boye Koch	1970	B Social Liberal Party	Copenhagen	Uffe Elbæk	1 January 2013	31 January 2013	30 days
Mie Bergmann	1950	B Social Liberal Party	East Jutland	Morten Østergaard	10 January 2013	3 February 2013	24 days
Per Husted	1966	A Social Democrats	North Jutland	Simon Kollerup	10 January 2013	17 February 2013	7 days
Sanne Rubinke	1961	F Socialist People's Party	East Jutland	Eigil Andersen	17 January 2013	22 April 2013	95 days
Vivi Kier	1958	C Conservatives	Funen	Mai Mercado	1 March 2013	20 December 2013	294 days
Karen Touborg	1972	F Socialist People's Party	North Jutland	Pernille Vigsø Bagge	4 April 2013	15 April 2013	11 days
Mette Boye	1974	F Socialist People's Party	Copenhagen	Ida Auken	30 April 2013	30 June 2013	61 days
Niels Christian Nielsen	1957	A Social Democrats	Funen	Julie Skovsby	25 June 2013	2 July 2013	7 days
Johan Lund Olsen	1958	IA Community of the People	Greenland	Sara Olsvig	8 September 2013	14 September 2013	6 days
Poul Andersen	1952	A Social Democrats	Funen	Julie Skovsby	10 September 2013	4 April 2014	206 days
Thomas Medom	1980	F Socialist People's Party	East Jutland	Eigil Andersen	1 October 2013	7 October 2013	6 days
Johan Lund Olsen	1958	IA Community of the People	Greenland	Sara Olsvig	1 October 2013	19 November 2013	49 days
Peder Christensen	1958	A Social Democrats	West Jutland	Thomas Jensen	21 October 2013	11 November 2013	21 days
Pernille Boye Koch	1970	B Social Liberal Party	Copenhagen	Uffe Elbæk	21 October 2013	8 November 2013	18 days
Per Husted	1966	A Social Democrats	North Jutland	Bjarne Laustsen	23 October 2013	8 November 2013	16 days
Merete Dea Larsen	1978	O Danish People's Party	Zealand	Karin Nødgaard	23 October 2013	8 November 2013	16 days
Rasmus Lynghøj	1981	A Social Democrats	West Jutland	Karin Gaardsted	23 October 2013	8 November 2013	16 days
Kristen Touborg	1943	F Socialist People's Party	South Jutland	Steen Gade	23 October 2013	8 November 2013	16 days
Jeppe Bruus	1978	A Social Democrats	Greater Copenhagen	Sophie Hæstorp Andersen	5 November 2013	3 December 2013	28 days
Annika Smith	1976	F Socialist People's Party	Copenhagen	Villy Søvndal	26 November 2013	20 December 2013	24 days
Per Husted	1966	A Social Democrats	North Jutland	Simon Kollerup	3 December 2013	20 December 2013	17 days
Karsten Hønge	1958	F Socialist People's Party	Funen	Anne Baastrup	28 January 2014	6 October 2014	251 days
Sanne Rubinke	1961	F Socialist People's Party	East Jutland	Jonas Dahl	11 March 2014	16 April 2014	36 days
Peder Christensen	1958	A Social Democrats	West Jutland	Thomas Jensen	18 March 2014	13 June 2014	87 days
Johan Lund Olsen	1958	IA Community of the People	Greenland	Sara Olsvig	21 March 2014	25 April 2014	35 days
Per Husted	1966	A Social Democrats	North Jutland	Simon Kollerup	22 April 2014	11 June 2014	50 days
Johan Lund Olsen	1958	IA Community of the People	Greenland	Sara Olsvig	15 September 2014	27 May 2015	254 days
Mie Bergmann	1950	B Social Liberal Party	East Jutland	Jeppe Mikkelsen	22 October 2014	7 November 2014	16 days
Kenneth Kristensen Berth	1977	O Danish People's Party	Greater Copenhagen	Søren Espersen	22 October 2014	7 November 2014	16 days
Karsten Hønge	1958	F Socialist People's Party	Funen	Annette Vilhelmsen	22 October 2014	7 November 2014	16 days
Peter Laigaard	1965	I Liberal Alliance	North Jutland	Thyra Frank	22 October 2014	7 November 2014	16 days
Sarah Nørris	1979	Ø Red-Green Alliance	South Jutland	Henning Hyllested	22 October 2014	7 November 2014	16 days
René Skau Björnsson	1967	A Social Democrats	East Jutland	Maja Panduro	4 November 2014	23 February 2015	111 days
Karl H. Bornhøft	1949	F Socialist People's Party	North Jutland	Pernille Vigsø Bagge	4 November 2014	19 December 2014	45 days
Bente Bendix	1961	V Liberals	South Jutland	Ellen Trane Nørby	7 November 2014	16 December 2014	39 days
Nick Nielsen	1975	SI Forward	Greenland	Doris Jakobsen	16 December 2014	11 February 2015	57 days
Sanne Rubinke	1961	F Socialist People's Party	East Jutland	Jonas Dahl	13 January 2015	27 February 2015	45 days
Ib Poulsen	1965	O Danish People's Party	North Jutland	Morten Marinus	20 January 2015	27 February 2015	38 days
Bruno Jerup	1957	Ø Red-Green Alliance	Zealand	Nikolaj Villumsen	26 January 2015	1 February 2015	6 days
Per Løkken	1962	C Conservatives	East Jutland	Tom Behnke	3 February 2015	26 April 2015	82 days
Susanne Eilersen	1964	O Danish People's Party	South Jutland	Anita Christensen	10 March 2015	27 May 2015	78 days
