= Hoiby =

Hoiby or Høiby is a surname. Notable people with the surname include:

- Jasper Høiby (born 1977), Danish jazz musician
- Lee Hoiby (1926–2011), American composer and pianist
- Marius Borg Høiby (born 1997), son of Queen Mette-Marit of Norway
- Mette-Marit Tjessem Høiby (born 1973), Queen Consort of Norway since 2026
- Niels Høiby (born 1941), Danish physician, professor and politician
- Sven O. Høiby (1936–2007), Norwegian convicted felon, father of Queen Mette-Marit of Norway
- Trond Høiby (born 1973), Norwegian decathlete
