= Niels Høiby =

Professor and politician

- Born: 12 August 1941 (age 85); Copenhagen
- Occupations: physician, professor, politician
- Political party: Liberal Alliance (Denmark)
- Awards: Order of the Dannebrog (2012)

Member of the Danish Parliament for North Zealand
- In office 5 June 2011 – 15 September 2011
- Preceded by: Malou Aamund

Niels Høiby (born 1941) is a Danish physician, professor and politician. He specialises in microbiology and was a pioneer in the study of biofilms and their role in conditions such as cystic fibrosis. He worked for many years as a department head at Denmark's largest hospital, the Rigshospitalet.

He was briefly a member of the Danish parliament, having been a runner-up in the 2007 election and so taking the seat for the Liberal Alliance when Malou Aamund changed party in 2011. Niels Høiby was decorated as a knight of the Order of the Dannebrog in 2012. He was a member of the council for the capital region.

== Books and papers ==
- Pseudomonas Aeruginosa Infection in Cystic Fibrosis (1977)
- Det danske sundhedsvæsens storhed og fald (1999), on the rise and fall of the Danish health service
- Antibiotic resistance of bacterial biofilms (2010)
- A personal history of research on microbial biofilms and biofilm infections (2014)
