= René Christensen (politician) =

Danish politician

Member of the Folketing
- Incumbent
- Assumed office 9 October 2008
- Constituency: Zealand

Personal details
- Born: 31 October 1970 (age 55) Nykøbing Falster, Denmark
- Party: Danish People's Party (until 2024); Moderates (2024-)

René Bjørn Christensen (born 31 October 1970 in Nykøbing Falster) is a Danish politician, who was a member of the Folketing for the Danish People's Party from 2007 to 2022. He entered parliament in 2008 after Mia Falkenberg resigned her seat. Christensen has a background as teacher and mechanic.

== Political career ==
Christensen has been a member of the municipal council of Guldborgsund Municipality since 2006.

Christensen received 1,412 votes in the 2007 Danish general election. While not enough for a seat in parliament, it made him the primary substitute for the Danish People's Party in the Sjælland constituency. He was called upon early in the term to substitute for Mia Falkenberg, from 10 January 2008 to 8 October 2008. Falkenberg resigned her seat on 9 October 2008, and Christensen took over the seat.

At the 2011 election Christensen was elected directly into parliament with 2,580 votes cast for him. He was reelected in 2015 with 8,180 votes and again in 2019 with 5,175 votes.

In February 2024 Christensen left the Danish People's Party and moved to the Moderates, claiming that the DPP had moved away from influencing Danish politics.
