= Mogens Camre =

Danish politician

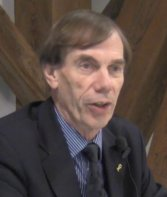
- Camre in 2011

Member of the European Parliament
- In office 20 June 1999 – 13 June 2009
- Constituency: Denmark

Member of the Folketing
- In office 23 January 1968 – 7 September 1987
- Constituency: Vestre Storkreds

Personal details
- Born: 29 March 1936 Frederikssund, Denmark
- Died: 5 December 2016 (aged 80)
- Party: Danish People's Party (from 1999); Social Democrats (until 1999)
- Other political affiliations: Union for Europe of the Nations

Mogens Niels Juel Camre (29 March 1936 – 5 December 2016) was a Danish politician and Member of the European Parliament for the Danish People's Party, a vice-chairman of the Union for a Europe of Nations and sat on the European Parliament's Committee on Budgetary Control and its Committee on Employment and Social Affairs. He was also substitute for the Committee on Constitutional Affairs.

== Controversy ==
Camre made statements on several occasions which occasioned controversy. Among other things, he stated that

"When I look at the voting rules, I see that countries like Romania and Bulgaria have many more votes than Denmark and Sweden and Finland, and I think - honestly speaking - that we are more clever than they are,"

This statement was interpreted by several other MEPs, among them Hannes Swoboda, an Austrian Social-Democrat and Renate Weber, a Romanian MEP, to mean that Camre had stated that Danes were more clever than Bulgarians and Romanians.

On 13 November 2007 he was elected to the Danish parliament, but only two days later announced that he declined his seat in parliament because it would mean that he couldn't finish his term in the European Parliament.

In 2015 he participated in a Pegida Denmark demonstration that gathered 200 demonstrators.

== Education ==
- 1961: Bachelor of commerce (accountancy)
- 1967: Master's degree in political and economic science

== Career ==
- 1967-1968 and 1987-1995: Civil servant, Budget Department of Finance Ministry
- 1974-1989: Member of Tax Tribunal
- since 1980: Chairman of the Board of KTAS (1982-1992) and board member of a number of other companies
- 1985-1987: Member of the Board of Governors of Denmark's National Bank
- 1995-1999: Budgetary Adviser with Denmark's Permanent Representation to the EU
- 1962-1966 and 1968-1987: Member of Executive Social Democratic Party in Copenhagen
- 1967-1968 and 1981-1982: Member of National Executive of Social Democratic Party
- 1981-1982: Member of Danish TUC's Executive Committee
- 1981-1982: Member of the executive committee of the Labour Movement's Economic Council
- 1968-1987: Member of the Folketing
- Member of several Folketing committees, including the Political and Economic Affairs Committee
- Chairman of the Folketing's Environment and Planning Committee
- Vice-chairman of the Folketing's Market Relations and Finance Committees
- since 1999: Member of the European Parliament
- since 1999: Vice-chairman of the Union for Europe of the Nations Group

== Quotes ==
Mogens Camre, Danish People's Party's annual meeting (September 16, 2001):

"The Islamic political-religious movement deals with world supremacy, as did other fanatic political ideologies in history. This world supremacy they are not able to achieve by military means, but try to achieve by flooding the world with people. All western countries are infiltrated by the Muslims - and some of them speak to us nicely, while they wait to be many enough to have us removed - like in the Sudan, Indonesia, Nigeria and in the Balkans."

"There shall not be given concessions to Islamic demands of a place in Denmark - never shall there be built a mosque in our country."

== See also ==
- 2004 European Parliament election in Denmark
