= Kamal Qureshi =

Danish politician

Member of Parliament
- In office 2001–2011

Personal details
- Born: 29 July 1970 (age 56) Rawalpindi, Pakistan
- Party: Social Democrats
- Other political affiliations: Socialist People's Party
- Spouse: Andreas Seebach
- Education: University of Copenhagen

Kamal Hameed Qureshi (Urdu: کمال حمید قریشی; born 29 July 1970) is a Danish-Pakistani politician.

== Life ==
Born in Rawalpindi, Pakistan, he moved with his parents to Copenhagen, Denmark at the age of four.

After attending Tårnby High School, Qureshi studied medicine at the University of Copenhagen, graduating as a medical doctor in 2000. Qureshi is a member of the Socialist People's Party and has been a member of the Danish parliament, the Folketing, from 2001 to 2011.

Qureshi was his party's spokesperson on health and minority issues. Qureshi is a party representative in the OSCE (Organization for Security and Cooperation in Europe).

Qureshi has contributed to various publications on multiculturalism and equal rights and is an active participant in the public debate in Denmark as well as a popular lecturer.

Throughout the years Qureshi has participated in humanitarian work, and been involved in association work. Among other things, he has been with a humanitarian organisation “Folkekirkens Nødhjælp” in Iraq, working as a doctor, during the war. He started the campaign “Room for diversity” in 2004, as a protest against the Danish government's view of humanity.

Twice, the national association for homosexuals has given him the title: politician of the year, because of his many legislative proposals and happenings on the subject.

Qureshi has been involved in a controversy regarding alleged fraud by illegal subletting of his apartment in Copenhagen. In the end the police did not find that any charges could be made.

In 2008 a newspaper wrote, that Qureshi in his student days, on one occasion had cheated on an exam by submitting another student's paper in his own name.

As a result of these public debates, the Socialist People's Party temporarily relieved Qureshi of all responsibilities in Parliament in 2008.

Qureshi is no longer a member of the parliament, though still is the Socialist Party's spokesman on human rights and minority issues.
