= Troels Ravn =

Danish politician

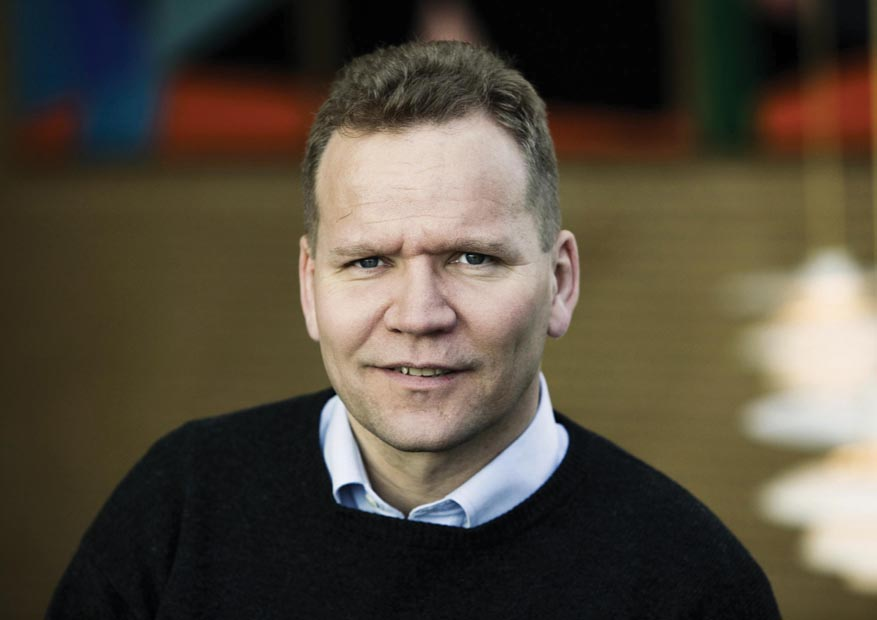
- Troels Ravn photo

Member of the Folketing
- Incumbent
- Assumed office 12 January 2016
- Constituency: South Jutland
- In office 15 September 2011 – 18 June 2015
- Constituency: South Jutland
- In office 8 February 2005 – 13 November 2007
- Constituency: Ribe

Personal details
- Born: 2 August 1961 (age 64) Bryrup, Denmark
- Party: Social Democrats

Troels Ravn (born 2 August 1961 in Bryrup) is a Danish politician, who is a member of the Folketing for the Social Democrats political party. He entered parliament on 12 January 2016 when Bjarne Corydon resigned his seat. He had previously been a member of parliament from 2005 to 2007 and again from 2011 to 2015.

== Political career ==
Ravn was a member of the municipal council of Vejen Municipality from 2002 to 2005 and again from 2010 to 2011. From 29 October 2008 to 20 November 2008 he was a substitute member of the Folketing, substituting for Lise von Seelen. In the 2005 Danish general election he was elected into parliament, but was not reelected in 2007. In 2011 he was elected again. In 2015 he was not reelected, but became a substitute member for his party in his constituency. When Bjarne Corydon resigned his seat on 12 January 2016, Ravn took over the seat. Ravn was reelected in 2019.
