= Preben Rudiengaard =

Danish physician and politician (1944–2022)

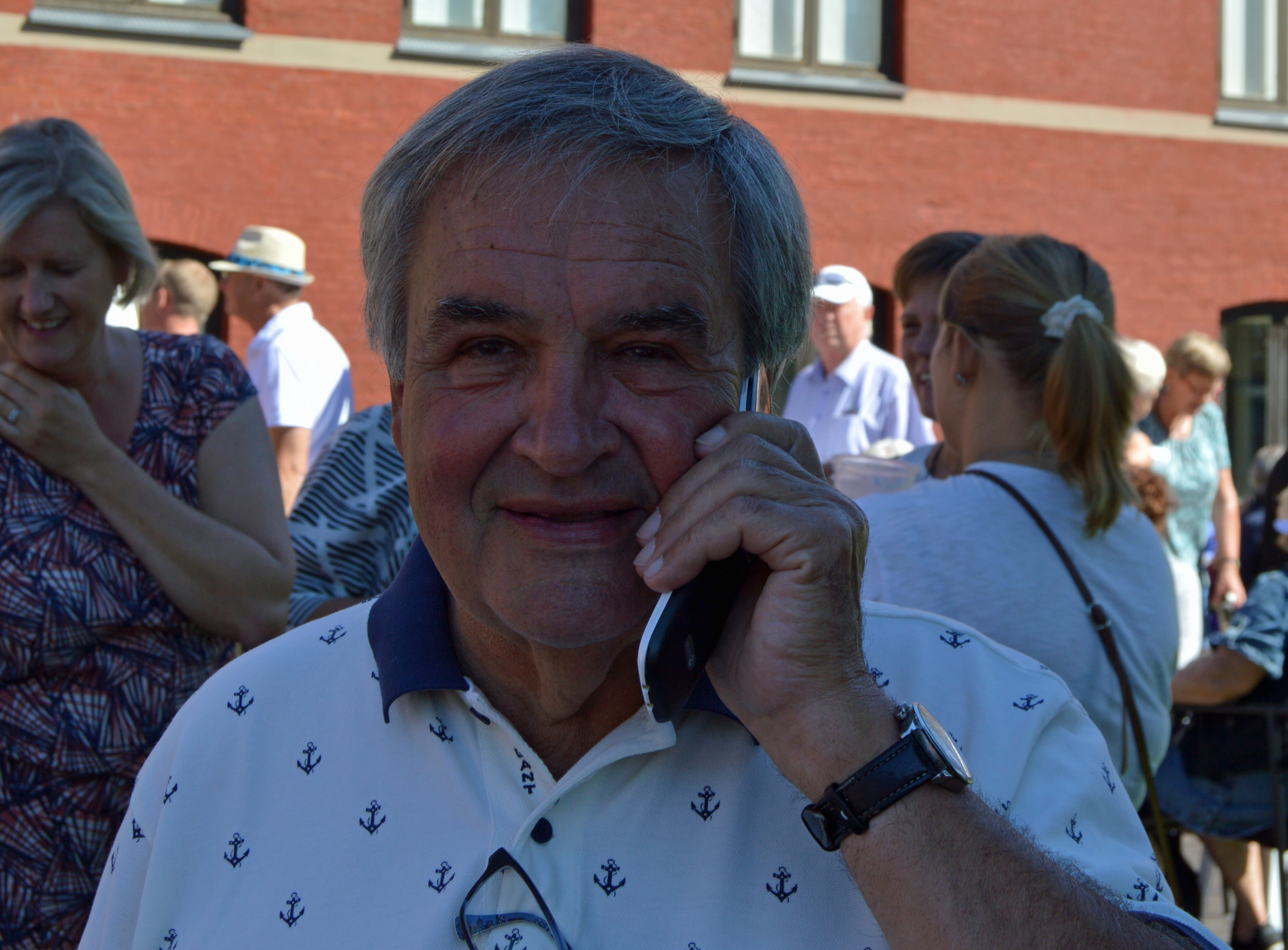
- Rudiengaard in 2016

Member of the Folketing
- In office 11 March 1998 – 15 September 2011
- Constituency: Ribe County constituency South Jutland

Personal details
- Born: Preben Georg Rudiengaard; 28 April 1944 Copenhagen, German-occupied Denmark
- Died: 14 October 2022 (aged 78) Ribe, Denmark
- Party: Venstre
- Education: University of Copenhagen
- Occupation: Physician

Preben Georg Rudiengaard (28 April 1944 – 14 October 2022) was a Danish politician. A member of the Venstre party, he served in the Folketing from 1998 to 2011.

Rudiengaard died in Ribe on 14 October 2022, at the age of 78.
