= Pernille Frahm =

Danish politician

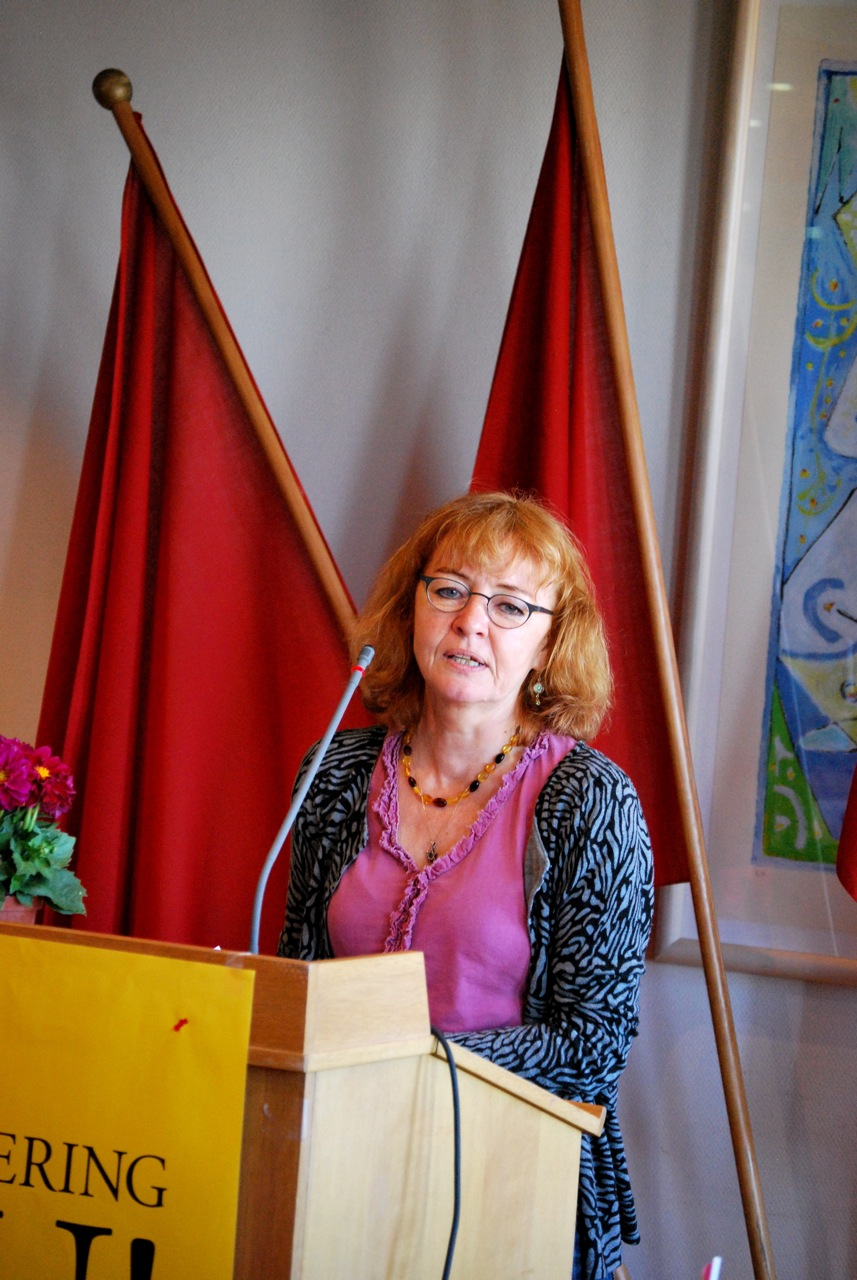

Member of the Folketing
- In office 12 December 1990 – 20 September 1994
- Monarch: Margrethe II
- Prime Minister: Poul Schlüter (1990–1993); Poul Nyrup Rasmussen (1993–1994)
- Constituency: Copenhagen
- In office 11 March 1998 – 19 July 1999
- Monarch: Margrethe II
- Prime Minister: Poul Nyrup Rasmussen (1998–1999)
- Constituency: Vestre Storkreds
- In office 13 November 2007 – 15 September 2011
- Monarch: Margrethe II
- Prime Minister: Anders Fogh Rasmussen (2001–2009); Lars Løkke Rasmussen (2009–2011)
- Constituency: East Jutland consistency

Member of the European Parliament
- In office 19 July 1999 – 19 July 2004
- Parliamentary group: EUL-NGL
- Constituency: Denmark

Personal details
- Born: 1 April 1954 (age 72) Hillerød, Denmark
- Citizenship: Denmark
- Party: Socialist People's Party
- Occupation: Teacher

Pernille Frahm (born 1 April 1954) is a Danish politician and teacher who served two terms as a member of the Folketing for the Socialist People's Party from 1990 to 1994 and again from 2007 to 2011 as well as serving as a Member of the European Parliament (MEP) for the Confederal Group of the European United Left – Nordic Green Left group between 1999 and 2004. She also was twice a member of the Parliamentary Assembly of the Council of Europe between 1998 and 1999 and also from 2007 to 2011.

== Biography ==
On 1 April 1954, Frahm was born in Hillerød, Denmark. She is the daughter of Christian Frahm, the associate professor, and Eva Bodil Frahm, the kindergarten teacher. Frahm was educated at Lyngby State School from 1968 to 1973. She passed the examination to qualify as a teacher at Frederiksberg Seminarium in 1978. Frahm began her teaching career at Hareskovens Lilleskole in Ballerup at and remained at the school until 1990. She also taught at Nordsjællands Friskole in Hillerød from 1988 to 1989. Frahm joined the main board of the Socialist People's Party (SF) in 1988 and served on Frie Grundskolers Lærerforening's district board until 1990.

Also in 1990, she was elected a member of the Folketing on behalf of the SF in the Copenhagen constituency. Frahm sat in the Folketing from 12 December 1990 until 20 September 1994. She returned to teaching following her first Parliamentary stint, educating at the School of Music and Theatre for socially disadvantaged young people and children in Copenhagen between 1995 and 1997, and then at Gasværksvejens Skole in Vesterbro, Copenhagen from 1997 to 1998. In between this, Frahm stood as a candidate for each of the Rødovre and Vesterbro constituencies in 1992 and 1996. She returned to the Folketing as an elected member of the constituency of Vestre Storkreds on 11 March 1998 and remained in Parliament until 19 July 1999. Frahm was appointed vice-chair of the GUE Group in 1999, and served on the Parliamentary Assembly of the Council of Europe from 20 April 1998 and 20 September 1999.

That same day, Frahm was elected a Member of the European Parliament (MEP) standing as a Confederal Group of the European United Left – Nordic Green Left (EUL–NGL) candidate for the Denmark constituency in the 1999 European Parliament election in Denmark. During her time as an MEP, she was vice-chair of the Delegation to the EU-Poland Joint Parliamentary Committee from 6 February 2002 to 30 April 2004, and the EUL–NGL vice-chair. Frahm served as a member of each of the Committee on Citizens' Freedoms and Rights, Justice and Home Affairs and the Committee on the Environment, Public Health and Consumer Policy. She was a substitute for both the Temporary committee on the Echelon interception system and twice on the Committee on Foreign Affairs, Human Rights, Common Security and Defence Policy. Frahm left the European Parliament on 19 July 2004, after an unsuccessful campaign focused on the environment, gender equality and security policy.

She matriculated to Danmarks Pædagogosike Universitet in Copenhagen from 2004 and 2006 and obtained a master's degree in special education. Frahm taught at Dronninggårdskolen in Holte between 2006 and 2007 and at Stengårds Skole in Gladsaxe Municipality from 2007 onward. On 13 November 2007, she was elected to serve the East Jutland consistency as a Member of the Folketing at the 2007 Danish parliamentary election. In Parliament, Frahm championed rapporteurships in Christianity, culture, special education, sports and veteran's affairs. She failed to gain re-election at the 2011 Danish parliamentary election. Frahm has served as a member of the Frederiksberg Municipal Council since 2014. She had been doing a second term at the Parliamentary Assembly of the Council of Europe between 21 January 2008 and 25 November 2011.
