= Mads Rørvig =

Danish politician

Mads Rørvig Member of the Danish Parliament
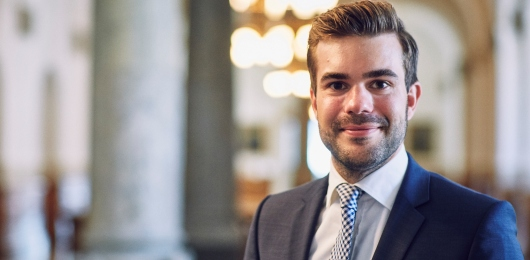
- In office 24 February 2010 – 18 June 2015
- Preceded by: Søren Gade
- Succeeded by: Thomas Danielsen
- Constituency: Silkeborg Sydkredsen

Personal details
- Born: Mads Rørvig Nielsen; 11 July 1985 (age 41) Viborg, Denmark
- Party: Venstre
- Education: Copenhagen Business School

Mads Rørvig Nielsen is a former Danish politician who was a member of the Danish Parliament from 2010 to 2015. He represented the district Silkeborg Sydkredsen as a member of the Venstre party. As of June 2020, Rørvig is the CEO of De Danske Bilimportører.

== Early life and education ==
Rørvig was born on 11 July 1988 in Viborg to Ole B. Nielsen and Marianne Rørvig Nielsen. As a child, Rørvig attended Kjellerup Skole, a folkeskole in Silkeborg Municipality. He graduated from the HHX program at Viborg Handelsskole in 2004.

Rørvig graduated as a civil economist in 2008, and later received a masters degree (cand.merc.) from the Copenhagen Business School in 2010. In 2009, while at the Copenhagen Business School, he studied abroad at Harvard University.

== Career ==
From 2005 to 2007, Rørvig was a political assistant for Venstre in Christiansborg. He was employed by Nykredit and from 2007 until 2010.

Rørvig was elected as first deputy to Kristian Pihl Lorentzen in at the 2007 general elections. He served as deputy from 28 October to 18 November 2009. Following Søren Gade's resignation, he became a member of parliament. At the 2011 general elections Rørvig was re-elected. In 2010 he became a member of The Women's Council. On 4 May 2010 Mads Rørvig voted, along with only four other members of his party, to give homosexual couples with registered partnerships the right to adopt on equal footing with heterosexuals. On 22 August 2013 Rørvig was appointed chairman of the Danish Parliament's Tax Committee. At the 2015 general election, he was not re-elected by his constituents.

In October 2015 he began as the public relations manager of Finance Danmark. In 2020, Rørvig was appointed the CEO of De Danske Bilimportører.
