= Villum Christensen =

Danish politician

Member of the Folketing
- In office 1 September 2008 – 5 June 2019
- Constituency: Zealand

Personal details
- Born: 31 July 1954 (age 71) Slagelse, Denmark
- Party: Liberal Alliance (from 2007); Danish Social Liberal Party (until 2007)

Villum Christensen (born 31 July 1954 in Slagelse) is a Danish politician, who was a member of the Folketing for the Liberal Alliance from 2008 to 2019. He entered parliament in 2008 after Gitte Seeberg resigned her seat.

== Political career ==
Christensen was a member of the Danish Social Liberal Party until 2007, where he left to join the newly founded Liberal Alliance. He has been a member of the municipal councils of Hashøj and Slagelse Municipality, and also served as deputy mayor of Slagelse Municipality. On 1 September 2008 he entered parliament after Gitte Seeberg resigned her seat. He was elected into parliament on his own mandate in 2011 and again in 2015. He did not seek reelection in the 2019 election.

== Bibliography ==
- Lederen som udenrigsminister (2007)
