= Lennart Damsbo-Andersen =

Danish politician

Member of the Folketing
- Incumbent
- Assumed office 13 November 2007
- Constituency: Zealand

Mayor of Nysted Municipality
- In office 1 January 2002 – 31 December 2006

Personal details
- Born: 5 October 1956 (age 69) Ovsted Parish, Denmark
- Party: Social Democrats

Lennart Damsbo-Andersen (born 5 October 1956 in Ovsted Parish near Skanderborg) is a Danish politician, who is a member of the Folketing for the Social Democrats political party. He was elected into parliament at the 2007 Danish general election.

== Political career ==
Damsbo-Andersen's political career began with local politics. He was in the municipal council of Nysted Municipality from 1993 until the municipality was merged with five other municipalities to form Guldborgsund Municipality in 2006. He was a member of the new municipality from 2006 to 2007. From 2002 to 2006 he was the mayor of Nysted Municipality.

Damsbo-Andersen first ran for parliament in the 2007 general election, where he was elected with 5,731 votes. He was reelected in 2011 with 6,662 votes, in 2015 with 5,902 votes and in 2019 with 5,648 votes.
