= Jørn Dohrmann =

Danish politician

Jørn Dohrmann MEP
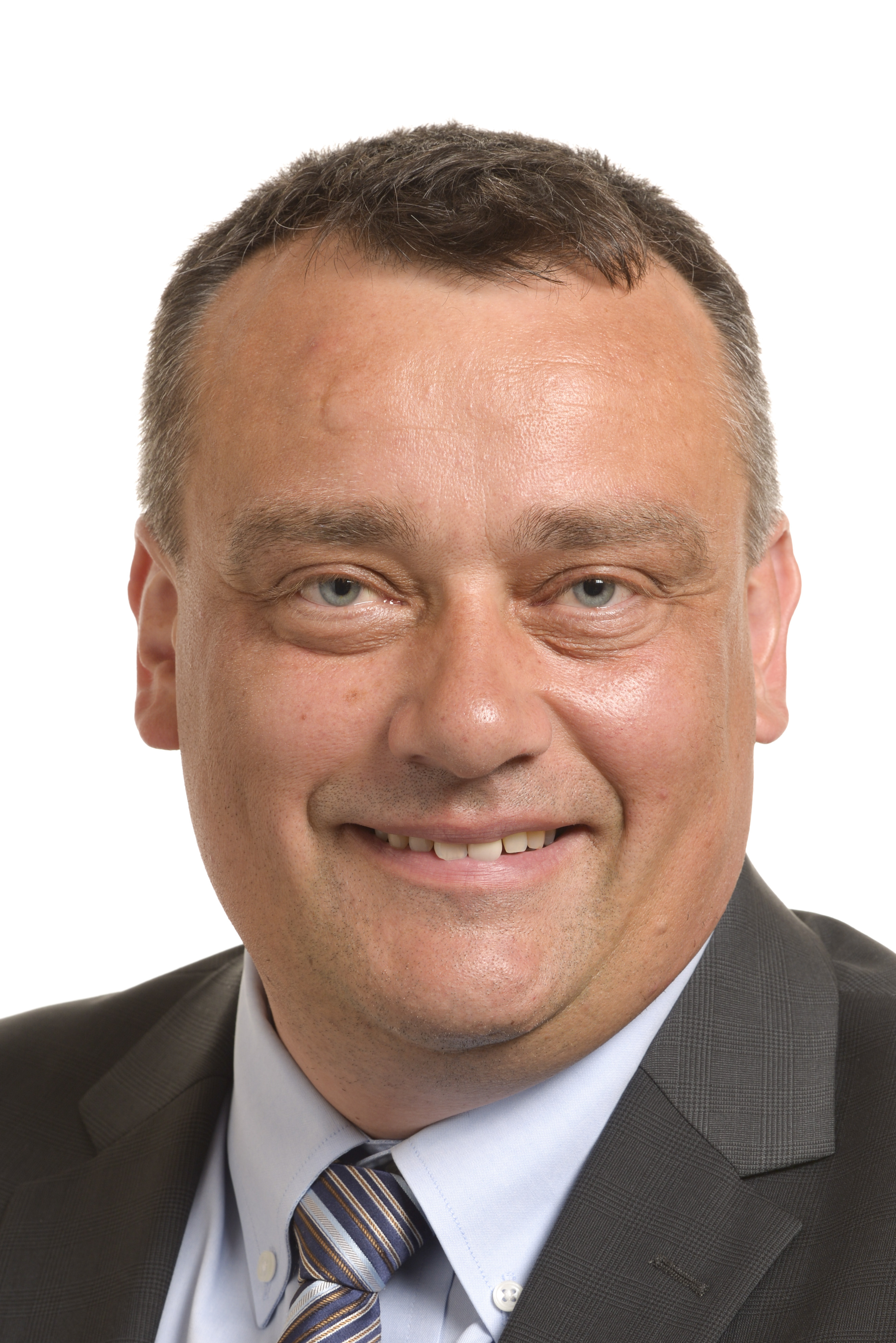

Member of the European Parliament
- Incumbent
- Assumed office 1 July 2014
- Constituency: Denmark

Member of the Folketing
- In office 20 November 2001 – 1 July 2014
- Constituency: Aalborg

Personal details
- Born: 9 January 1969 (age 57) Kolding, Denmark
- Party: Danish; Danish People's Party; EU; ERC
- Website: www.dohrmann.eu

Jørn Dohrmann (born 9 January 1969) is a Danish politician and Member of the European Parliament (MEP) from Denmark. He is a member of the Danish People's Party, part of the European Conservatives and Reformists. He was a member of the Folketing from 2001 to 2014. In 2014 he was elected to the European Parliament for European Conservatives and Reformists.
