= Søren Espersen =

Danish politician, journalist, and author

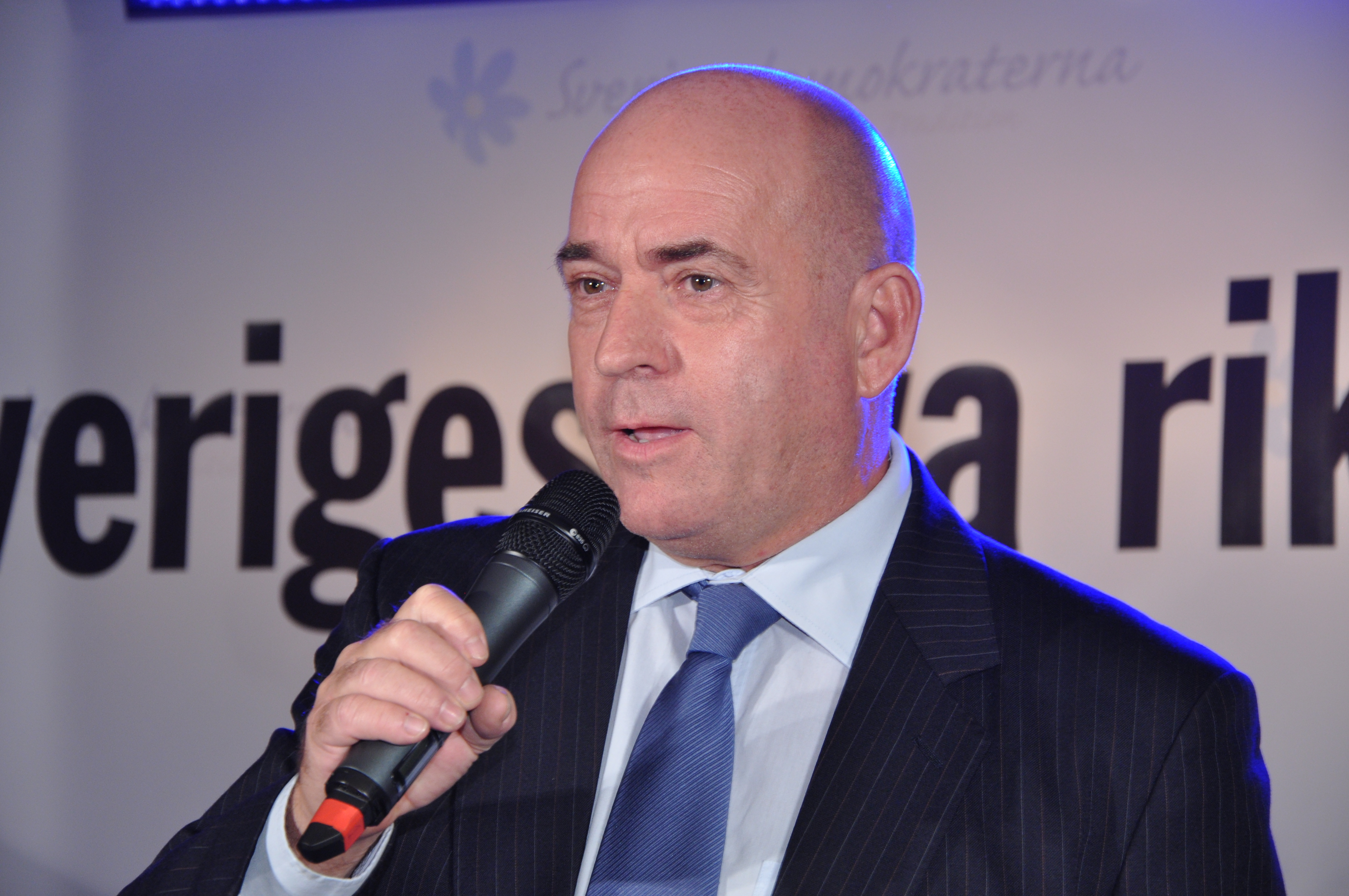
- Espersen in 2010

Member of the Folketing
- Incumbent
- Assumed office 8 February 2005
- Constituency: Zealand (from 2015); Greater Copenhagen (2007–2015); Copenhagen (2005–2007)

Personal details
- Born: 20 July 1953 (age 72) Svenstrup, Denmark
- Party: Denmark Democrats (2022–)
- Other political affiliations: Danish People's Party (until 2022); Progress Party (before 1995)
- Children: Susie Jessen (daughter)

Søren Espersen (born 20 July 1953) is a Danish politician, journalist, and author, who is a member of the Folketing for the Denmark Democrats. Espersen was originally elected for the Danish People's Party in 2005, and was the party's foreign affairs spokesperson. He is a former chairman of Udenrigspolitisk Nævn. In 2022, he switched affiliation to the Denmark Democrats and was re-elected to the Folketing.

== Political career ==
Espersen was a candidate for the Progress Party from 1992 to 1995. Espersen was first elected into parliament at the 2005 Danish general election. He was reelected in the 2007 election. He was elected again in 2011 with 6,358 votes, in 2015 with 14,482 votes and in 2019 with 5,930 votes.

In an interview with a Danish television station in 2017, Søren Espersen expressed that he would consider a connection between southern Schleswig and Denmark to be desirable, with the Danish-German border being relocated to the Eider.

His daughter Susie Jessen is also a member of the Folketing.

== Bibliography ==
- Israels selvstændighedskrig – og de danske frivillige (2007)
- Valdemar Rørdam ‒ Nationalskjald og Landsforræder (2003)
- Danmarks fremtid – dit land, dit valg… (2001, co-author)
