= Julie Skovsby =

Danish politician (born 1978)

Member of the Folketing
- Incumbent
- Assumed office 13 November 2007
- Constituency: Fyn

Personal details
- Born: 15 November 1978 (age 47) Odense, Denmark
- Party: Social Democrats

Julie Skovsby (born 15 November 1978 in Odense) is a Danish politician, who is a member of the Folketing for the Social Democrats political party. She was elected into parliament at the 2007 Danish general election.
