= Helle Sjelle =

Danish politician (born 1971)

Helle Sjelle (born 3 March 1971, in Faxe) is a Danish politician who served in the Danish Parliament from 2001 to 2011 as a member of the Conservative People's Party, having been elected into office a representative for Østre Storkreds constituency in 2001, and then for the Copenhagen constituency in 2007, and finally for Næstved before losing in the 2011 Danish general election. A graduate of the University of Copenhagen, she previously served on the Copenhagen City Council from 1998 to 2005, and was on the board of the Kvinderådet from 1998 to 2008. She was recently on the board of the Frederiksberg Municipality from 2018 to 2023. She has been married to Lars Barfoed since 2014.
