= Malou Aamund =

Danish businesswoman

Malou Aamund (born 28 July 1969) is a Danish businesswoman. She is the CEO of Google Denmark and a board member of DSV A/S, KIRKBI A/S and WS Audiology. She previously held executive positions at IBM and Microsoft. She is a former member of the Folketing for the party Venstre. In the parliamentary elections in November 2007, she was elected as a member of the party New Alliance, but changed party on 5 February 2008. She was the spokesperson for innovation, research and higher education for the liberal party Venstre.

She is the daughter of businessman Asger Aamund and artist Susanne Aamund, and is married to Mikael Bertelsen, a TV and radio personality, with whom she has three children. She was previously in a relationship with Frederik, Crown Prince of Denmark

On 4 January 2011, Aamund announced that she was leaving politics and returning to her business career to become a sales director for Microsoft Denmark.

In September 2016 it was announced, that Aamund would take on the role as managing director for Google Denmark. She was succeeded in September 2022 by Bianca Bruhn.
