= Charlotte Dyremose =

Danish politician and pastor

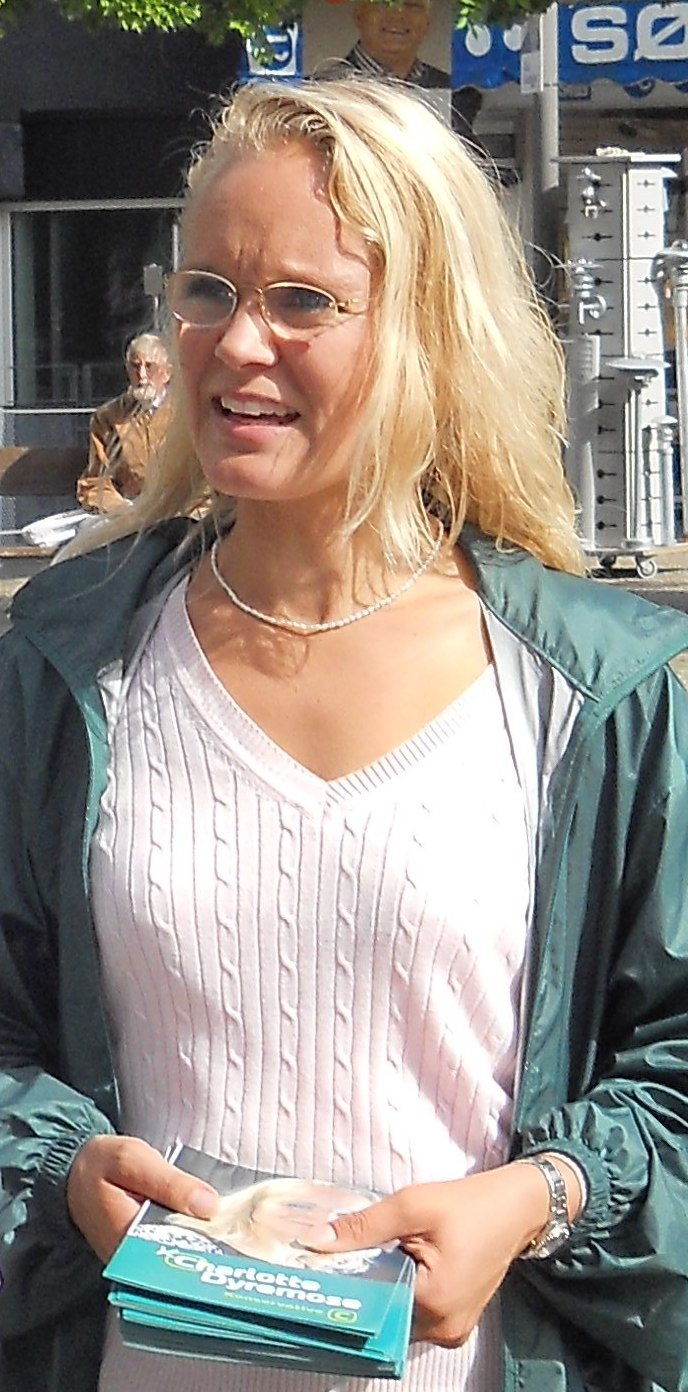
Charlotte Dyremose (2011)

Charlotte Baunbæk Dyremose (born 9 October 1977) is a Danish Conservative politician and a Church of Denmark pastor. She was a member of the Folketing (Danish parliament) from 2001 to 2011 and from 2013 to 2015. Among her parliamentary responsibilities, she was spokeswoman for ecclesiastical affairs. Dyremose was ordained in Helsingør Cathedral in June 2019 and as of December 2023 serves as a pastor in Hellerup Church.

== Early life, education and family ==
Born in Copenhagen on 9 October 1977, Charlotte Baunbæk Dyremose is the daughter of the politician Henning Baunbæk Dyremose (born 1945) and his wife Elly, a physician. After graduating from Virum Gymnasium in 1996, she studied political science at the University of Copenhagen earning a bachelor's degree in 2000 and a master's in 2004. On 14 July 2001, she married the politician Jacob D. Bræstrup. The couple have two children.

== Career ==
In 2001, when she was just 24 she was elected to the Folketing, representing the Copenhagen County constituency as candidate for the Conservative Party in the Hellerup nomination district. After serving until 2006, in 2007 she was re-elected representing the Conservative Party in the Greater Copenhagen constituency as candidate for the Lyngby nomination district. She served until 2011. Her final term at the Folketing was from January 2014 until June 2015 when she again represented the Conservative Party in the Greater Copenhagen constituency.

Her parliamentary responsibilities included chair of the Education Committee and vice-chair of the Social Services Committee (2001–05). She served as spokeswoman on areas including social affairs (2001–05), family policy (2004–05), education (2006–11) and ecclesiastical affairs (2005–11 and 2014–15).

As a child, Dyremose was not particularly religious although she was brought up in a Christian family. It was first in connection with her confirmation that she became more interested in the importance of faith. Christianity went on to play an important part in her political life. It was therefore not difficult for her to turn from politics to religion.

In June 2019, Dyremose was ordained in Helsingør Cathedral and became a parish priest in Ganløse. After a period at Bistrup Church in the north of Zealand, as of December 2023 she is attached to Hellerup Church, just north of Copenhagen.
