= Mikkel Dencker =

Danish politician

Member of the Folketing
- In office 20 November 2001 – 5 June 2019
- Constituency: Greater Copenhagen (2007–2019); København (2001–2007)

Personal details
- Born: 20 November 1975 (age 50) Frederiksberg, Denmark
- Party: Danish People's Party

Mikkel Sjøberg Dencker (born 20 November 1975 in Frederiksberg) is a Danish politician, who was a member of the Folketing for the Danish People's Party from 2001 to 2019.

== Political career ==
Dencker has been a member of the municipal council of Hvidovre Municipality since 1998, and has served as the municipality's deputy mayor. At the 2001 Danish general election, Dencker was elected into parliament. He was reelected in 2005, 2007, 2011 and 2015. He ran in the 2019 election but failed to win reelection, receiving 859 votes.
