= Results of the 2019 European Parliament election in Denmark =

This is a list of the results of the 2019 European Parliament election in Denmark. The results are as found on the official website dedicated to the results made by Statistics Denmark.

== Denmark ==
Division	A	B	C	F	I	N	O	V	Ø	Å
Division	%	%	%	%	%	%	%	%	%	%
Denmark	21.5	10.1	6.2	13.2	2.2	3.7	10.8	23.5	5.5	3.4

== Vote share by electoral division ==
Division	A	B	C	F	I	N	O	V	Ø	Å
Division	%	%	%	%	%	%	%	%	%	%
Mid & Northern Jutland	22.6	8.5	5.2	11.6	2.2	3.4	10.1	29.2	4.4	2.9
Zealand & Southern Denmark	23.5	8.0	5.8	11.1	2.3	4.0	13.8	24.3	4.7	2.6
Capital	18.1	14.0	7.7	17.2	2.1	3.7	8.1	16.7	7.6	4.7

== Vote share by constituency ==
Division	A	B	C	F	I	N	O	V	Ø	Å
Division	%	%	%	%	%	%	%	%	%	%
North Jutland	25.7	6.3	3.9	9.3	1.7	3.9	10.3	32.8	3.8	2.3
West Jutland	19.8	7.3	6.0	9.3	1.9	3.1	10.6	36.9	3.0	2.0
East Jutland	22.1	10.8	5.5	14.7	2.6	3.2	9.6	21.8	5.7	4.0
South Jutland	22.2	7.5	5.2	8.7	3.2	3.4	15.8	28.2	3.7	2.1
Funen	24.8	9.0	7.1	13.1	1.9	3.9	10.6	20.7	5.5	3.4
Zealand	23.8	7.8	5.5	11.9	1.8	4.5	14.0	23.1	5.1	2.5
North Zealand	17.9	12.4	10.0	12.6	2.6	3.4	9.9	23.7	4.5	2.9
Greater Copenhagen	21.4	12.7	8.7	14.1	2.0	4.2	10.2	17.5	6.1	3.0
Copenhagen	15.0	16.4	5.8	22.8	1.9	3.6	5.3	11.5	10.6	7.0
Bornholm	38.8	4.4	3.3	6.8	1.1	4.4	14.5	18.3	5.1	3.3

== Vote share by nomination district ==
Division	A	B	C	F	I	N	O	V	Ø	Å
Division	%	%	%	%	%	%	%	%	%	%
Frederikshavn	28.9	3.9	3.9	7.2	1.2	4.6	14.1	31.8	3.1	1.3
Hjørring	24.7	5.2	4.3	8.9	1.5	3.7	11.0	35.5	3.4	1.7
Brønderslev	28.7	4.5	3.1	6.9	1.3	4.2	10.9	36.2	2.6	1.5
Thisted	22.8	4.7	3.4	7.9	1.3	3.2	10.2	41.7	3.0	1.8
Himmerland	21.4	6.0	4.3	8.6	1.5	3.4	11.1	39.3	2.9	1.7
Mariagerfjord	24.9	5.7	3.6	8.3	2.1	3.6	11.7	34.7	3.3	1.9
Aalborg East	28.0	9.2	3.6	12.5	2.1	4.1	8.3	23.0	5.5	3.6
Aalborg West	24.5	8.7	4.7	11.6	2.0	3.7	7.7	29.1	4.8	3.2
Aalborg North	26.7	7.9	3.8	11.1	2.0	4.2	9.1	26.5	5.1	3.5
Struer	18.9	6.0	3.8	9.7	1.4	3.1	10.1	43.1	2.6	1.3
Skive	24.4	7.0	4.2	9.0	1.6	4.7	11.5	33.2	3.1	1.5
Viborg West	22.8	7.8	8.9	11.6	1.7	3.1	10.7	27.2	3.6	2.6
Viborg East	20.6	7.6	9.7	9.4	1.8	2.7	11.4	32.0	2.9	1.8
Silkeborg North	21.0	8.9	6.3	10.8	2.1	3.3	11.4	29.6	3.8	2.7
Silkeborg South	21.4	11.5	6.4	12.8	2.4	3.1	8.9	25.3	4.5	3.5
Ikast	19.1	6.0	6.1	7.2	2.3	3.2	14.7	37.3	2.5	1.5
Herning South	17.9	7.3	6.1	8.8	2.6	2.9	10.1	38.9	3.1	2.3
Herning North	16.7	6.4	5.9	7.2	2.2	2.5	9.9	45.5	2.3	1.5
Holstebro	18.6	5.9	3.0	8.5	1.5	2.6	8.4	47.1	2.9	1.5
Ringkøbing	17.0	5.6	6.6	7.2	2.0	2.8	10.9	44.6	2.1	1.3
Aarhus South	20.3	12.8	6.1	17.8	2.5	3.0	6.2	20.5	6.0	4.8
Aarhus West	23.1	13.0	5.2	15.8	2.2	3.5	8.1	16.8	8.2	4.1
Aarhus North	20.3	14.7	5.2	19.6	2.5	3.1	5.6	14.8	8.1	6.2
Aarhus East	16.8	15.4	6.1	19.1	3.0	2.4	4.7	18.9	6.9	6.7
Djurs	21.9	6.9	4.7	16.4	1.9	4.1	12.7	24.2	4.5	2.8
Randers North	29.3	6.7	4.4	9.5	2.1	4.5	13.0	23.9	4.3	2.1
Randers South	26.6	6.9	5.3	10.7	2.5	3.9	12.6	24.3	4.6	2.6
Favrskov	24.4	9.4	5.8	10.9	2.1	3.1	11.6	26.4	3.7	2.6
Skanderborg	22.8	10.2	6.0	13.2	2.3	3.0	9.4	24.9	4.7	3.4
Horsens	24.5	8.1	5.3	10.5	4.4	3.3	14.0	22.6	4.8	2.3
Hedensted	20.5	6.0	5.9	7.5	3.0	3.1	17.3	32.3	3.0	1.5
Sønderborg	25.5	7.6	5.0	8.0	3.2	3.7	16.7	25.3	3.0	2.0
Aabenraa	21.6	6.8	4.5	7.2	3.3	3.4	19.1	29.2	3.1	1.7
Tønder	20.5	5.8	4.7	7.5	4.6	3.1	17.2	32.5	2.7	1.4
City of Esbjerg	25.2	7.2	4.7	10.5	2.6	5.4	14.4	21.2	6.1	2.7
Greater Esbjerg	21.9	6.3	5.3	9.2	3.2	3.4	14.5	30.5	3.7	2.1
Varde	18.9	5.8	4.7	7.0	3.5	3.2	16.4	36.3	2.5	1.6
Vejen	20.6	6.2	5.2	6.7	3.5	3.0	17.0	33.4	3.0	1.4
Vejle North	19.7	10.3	6.0	9.7	3.2	2.5	14.4	28.5	3.3	2.5
Vejle South	22.6	9.3	5.2	10.1	2.9	3.0	13.6	26.6	4.3	2.5
Fredericia	26.9	7.2	5.4	9.9	2.4	3.9	15.2	22.0	5.0	2.2
Kolding North	19.2	9.6	6.2	9.3	3.1	3.2	11.8	31.0	3.8	2.7
Kolding South	20.8	7.9	5.4	9.9	3.3	3.7	15.4	27.6	3.4	2.6
Haderslev	23.0	6.5	5.2	8.1	3.4	3.3	19.2	25.4	3.7	2.1
Odense East	23.8	13.1	5.5	15.9	2.1	3.4	8.4	14.2	8.4	5.1
Odense West	26.0	9.0	7.1	14.4	2.0	3.4	10.0	18.4	5.8	3.8
Odense South	22.5	11.2	8.5	14.2	2.4	2.8	8.5	21.0	5.0	4.0
Assens	26.9	6.6	6.9	10.9	1.7	4.4	12.5	23.5	4.1	2.4
Middelfart	26.1	7.3	7.6	10.5	2.0	3.9	12.1	25.1	3.5	2.0
Nyborg	27.5	7.1	7.4	11.3	1.8	4.7	12.3	21.3	4.5	2.3
Svendborg	23.0	8.5	6.3	14.6	1.8	4.5	10.5	19.9	7.0	3.9
Faaborg	24.6	7.8	7.1	11.6	1.4	4.3	11.9	23.5	5.0	2.8
Lolland	33.0	4.5	3.5	9.9	1.1	5.6	16.4	20.2	4.3	1.5
Guldborgsund	28.7	5.9	4.4	10.7	1.3	4.9	15.9	21.4	4.7	2.0
Vordingborg	25.9	7.3	4.6	12.6	1.3	4.6	13.1	21.0	6.3	3.2
Næstved	26.5	6.9	5.4	11.4	1.8	4.5	13.4	22.5	5.2	2.3
Faxe	22.0	6.4	6.2	11.7	1.8	5.1	15.8	24.2	4.5	2.3
Køge	21.0	8.6	6.2	14.7	1.9	4.2	12.5	23.9	4.4	2.7
Greve	21.1	8.6	6.6	8.8	2.4	3.7	14.1	29.0	3.6	2.1
Roskilde	21.1	11.9	6.8	14.8	1.9	3.6	9.4	21.5	5.6	3.6
Holbæk	23.4	8.9	5.0	11.9	2.0	4.6	13.1	22.5	5.9	2.7
Kalundborg	24.0	6.6	4.4	10.9	1.6	5.0	16.9	23.0	5.3	2.4
Ringsted	21.7	8.0	6.2	12.6	1.8	4.1	14.3	22.9	5.6	2.8
Slagelse	24.0	6.9	4.8	11.0	2.0	4.6	15.8	23.5	5.2	2.3
Helsingør	19.9	12.1	9.9	13.9	2.1	4.2	10.4	17.7	6.2	3.7
Fredensborg	14.0	13.2	13.9	10.9	3.5	2.5	8.6	27.5	3.4	2.5
Hillerød	18.5	10.7	7.7	13.4	2.1	3.9	10.8	24.5	5.0	3.3
Frederikssund	23.0	7.9	5.6	13.0	1.8	4.6	14.7	21.6	5.2	2.6
Egedal	19.4	13.5	8.9	13.2	2.6	3.0	9.5	22.7	4.3	2.9
Rudersdal	13.0	16.5	14.3	11.4	3.3	2.3	6.3	26.9	3.3	2.8
Gentofte	10.6	16.4	17.6	11.4	3.4	2.1	5.5	26.6	3.4	3.1
Lyngby	14.9	17.1	12.2	15.7	2.9	2.6	6.2	21.0	4.1	3.3
Gladsaxe	21.9	13.6	6.1	17.7	2.0	4.6	8.5	15.3	6.6	3.7
Rødovre	26.4	9.9	5.9	15.2	1.5	5.0	11.3	14.0	7.8	3.1
Hvidovre	24.4	10.8	5.1	16.3	1.3	5.0	13.0	13.7	7.2	3.2
Brøndby	25.6	11.7	6.6	11.2	1.4	4.7	13.9	15.3	7.3	2.3
Taastrup	23.8	11.5	7.6	13.3	1.4	5.5	12.2	14.1	7.7	2.9
Ballerup	27.0	9.5	5.5	13.4	1.8	5.0	12.7	16.6	5.8	2.7
Østerbro	13.9	18.5	6.7	22.7	2.4	2.9	4.2	13.5	8.6	6.6
Sundbyvester	15.0	17.3	5.1	22.6	2.2	3.6	5.5	11.5	10.2	7.0
Inner City	11.5	19.2	7.2	23.2	2.5	2.7	3.1	13.7	9.2	7.7
Sundbyvester	16.1	15.1	4.7	22.8	2.0	4.4	5.9	10.9	10.6	7.6
Nørrebro	10.4	17.3	2.9	29.8	1.1	3.4	2.4	5.7	16.7	10.3
Bispebjerg	14.5	14.7	3.7	25.2	1.3	4.5	5.3	7.0	15.5	8.3
Brønshøj	18.0	14.7	5.2	22.9	1.5	4.3	6.7	10.3	10.8	5.5
Valby	17.4	15.5	5.0	22.1	1.9	4.1	6.2	10.9	10.5	6.4
Vesterbro	12.3	17.3	4.2	25.6	2.1	3.5	3.5	9.4	12.9	9.3
Falkoner	13.9	19.6	9.4	20.9	2.2	2.3	4.2	13.9	7.5	6.1
Slots	15.5	16.5	10.2	18.6	2.4	3.1	5.7	14.7	8.0	5.2
Tårnby	23.8	9.4	6.3	13.1	1.8	5.1	13.7	19.2	5.1	2.6
Rønne	41.9	4.3	3.4	6.5	1.0	4.4	14.9	16.4	4.2	3.0
Aakirkeby	35.8	4.5	3.2	7.2	1.3	4.3	14.1	20.2	5.9	3.6

== Vote share by region ==
Division	A	B	C	F	I	N	O	V	Ø	Å
Division	%	%	%	%	%	%	%	%	%	%
North Jutland	25.7	6.3	3.9	9.3	1.7	3.9	10.3	32.8	3.8	2.3
Central Denmark	21.2	9.4	5.7	12.6	2.4	3.2	10.0	27.7	4.7	3.2
Southern Denmark	23.3	8.1	6.0	10.5	2.7	3.6	13.6	25.0	4.4	2.6
Zealand	23.8	7.8	5.5	11.9	1.8	4.5	14.0	23.1	5.1	2.5
Capital	18.1	14.0	7.7	17.2	2.1	3.7	8.1	16.7	7.6	4.7

== Vote share by Municipality ==
Division	A	B	C	F	I	N	O	V	Ø	Å
Division	%	%	%	%	%	%	%	%	%	%
Brønderslev	26.2	5.1	3.4	7.7	1.5	4.0	10.8	36.5	3.1	1.7
Frederikshavn	29.2	3.9	3.9	7.2	1.2	4.6	13.9	31.8	3.0	1.3
Hjørring	24.7	5.2	4.3	8.9	1.5	3.7	11.0	35.5	3.4	1.7
Jammerbugt	31.1	3.9	2.8	6.0	1.2	4.4	10.9	36.0	2.3	1.4
Læsø	18.7	4.0	4.4	8.5	1.3	5.2	20.2	32.1	4.4	1.2
Mariagerfjord	24.9	5.7	3.6	8.3	2.1	3.6	11.7	34.7	3.3	1.9
Morsø	24.3	4.6	2.9	7.8	1.3	3.1	9.9	42.4	2.5	1.3
Rebild	22.2	7.9	4.2	9.6	2.0	3.3	9.5	35.9	3.4	2.1
Thisted	22.1	4.7	3.7	8.0	1.2	3.2	10.4	41.3	3.3	2.0
Vesthimmerlands	20.7	4.3	4.4	7.7	1.1	3.5	12.4	42.3	2.4	1.3
Aalborg	26.5	8.6	4.0	11.8	2.1	4.0	8.3	26.0	5.1	3.4
Favrskov	24.4	9.4	5.8	10.9	2.1	3.1	11.6	26.4	3.7	2.6
Hedensted	20.5	6.0	5.9	7.5	3.0	3.1	17.3	32.3	3.0	1.5
Herning	17.2	6.8	6.0	8.0	2.4	2.7	10.0	42.5	2.6	1.9
Holstebro	18.6	5.9	3.0	8.5	1.5	2.6	8.4	47.1	2.9	1.5
Horsens	24.5	8.1	5.3	10.5	4.4	3.3	14.0	22.6	4.8	2.3
Ikast-Brande	19.1	6.0	6.1	7.2	2.3	3.2	14.7	37.3	2.5	1.5
Lemvig	16.7	6.5	3.7	9.9	1.4	2.7	10.0	45.9	2.0	1.2
Norddjurs	24.9	5.6	4.2	12.4	2.0	4.5	15.1	24.8	4.2	2.2
Odder	24.1	8.7	5.8	14.6	1.8	2.8	9.2	24.6	5.3	3.1
Randers	27.9	6.8	4.9	10.1	2.3	4.2	12.8	24.1	4.5	2.4
Ringkøbing-Skjern	17.0	5.6	6.6	7.2	2.0	2.8	10.9	44.6	2.1	1.3
Samsø	20.2	6.9	7.4	13.7	1.9	6.0	8.0	24.8	7.2	3.7
Silkeborg	21.2	10.3	6.4	11.8	2.3	3.2	10.1	27.4	4.2	3.2
Skanderborg	22.5	11.0	6.0	12.7	2.4	2.9	9.6	25.1	4.3	3.5
Skive	24.4	7.0	4.2	9.0	1.6	4.7	11.5	33.2	3.1	1.5
Struer	21.0	5.5	4.0	9.4	1.4	3.5	10.2	40.5	3.2	1.3
Syddjurs	19.7	7.8	5.0	19.4	1.8	3.7	10.9	23.7	4.8	3.3
Viborg	21.8	7.7	9.3	10.6	1.8	2.9	11.0	29.5	3.2	2.2
Aarhus	19.9	14.1	5.7	18.2	2.6	2.9	6.0	17.8	7.3	5.5
Assens	26.9	6.6	6.9	10.9	1.7	4.4	12.5	23.5	4.1	2.4
Billund	20.2	6.7	4.6	5.9	3.3	2.9	18.1	34.3	2.7	1.3
Esbjerg	23.7	6.6	4.9	9.6	2.9	4.4	14.6	25.9	4.9	2.4
Fanø	20.2	9.7	7.8	15.4	1.9	4.6	11.5	18.4	6.6	3.9
Fredericia	26.9	7.2	5.4	9.9	2.4	3.9	15.2	22.0	5.0	2.2
Faaborg-Midtfyn	25.1	7.8	6.7	11.6	1.5	4.1	12.0	23.6	4.7	2.8
Haderslev	23.0	6.5	5.2	8.1	3.4	3.3	19.2	25.4	3.7	2.1
Kerteminde	27.7	7.0	8.9	11.1	1.8	5.0	12.6	19.5	4.3	2.0
Kolding	20.0	8.7	5.8	9.6	3.2	3.5	13.7	29.2	3.6	2.7
Langeland	22.2	7.5	6.0	14.3	1.0	5.6	13.1	22.4	5.4	2.5
Middelfart	25.6	8.5	7.8	11.0	2.1	3.3	11.2	24.4	3.7	2.3
Nordfyns	26.7	5.6	7.4	9.7	1.9	4.6	13.4	25.9	3.2	1.6
Nyborg	27.3	7.1	6.3	11.4	1.8	4.4	12.1	22.6	4.6	2.4
Odense	24.0	11.2	7.1	14.8	2.2	3.2	8.9	18.0	6.4	4.3
Svendborg	23.1	8.7	6.4	14.7	1.9	4.3	10.0	19.4	7.3	4.1
Sønderborg	25.5	7.6	5.0	8.0	3.2	3.7	16.7	25.3	3.0	2.0
Tønder	20.5	5.8	4.7	7.5	4.6	3.1	17.2	32.5	2.7	1.4
Varde	18.9	5.8	4.7	7.0	3.5	3.2	16.4	36.3	2.5	1.6
Vejen	20.9	5.9	5.5	7.3	3.7	3.0	16.2	32.8	3.2	1.5
Vejle	21.2	9.8	5.6	9.9	3.0	2.7	14.0	27.5	3.8	2.5
Ærø	19.9	7.2	10.7	11.6	0.8	5.7	11.2	22.6	7.4	3.0
Aabenraa	21.6	6.8	4.5	7.2	3.3	3.4	19.1	29.2	3.1	1.7
Greve	21.9	8.3	6.2	8.3	2.1	3.9	14.9	28.5	3.9	2.0
Køge	21.8	8.1	6.2	14.7	2.0	4.2	13.0	23.7	4.1	2.2
Lejre	19.4	9.7	6.1	14.7	1.6	4.2	11.7	24.1	5.0	3.5
Roskilde	21.1	11.9	6.8	14.8	1.9	3.6	9.4	21.5	5.6	3.6
Solrød	19.6	9.0	7.3	10.0	2.8	3.3	12.3	30.2	3.2	2.2
Faxe	22.4	6.4	6.0	11.9	1.7	5.1	16.4	23.6	4.3	2.3
Guldborgsund	28.7	5.9	4.4	10.7	1.3	4.9	15.9	21.4	4.7	2.0
Holbæk	23.4	8.9	5.0	11.9	2.0	4.6	13.1	22.5	5.9	2.7
Kalundborg	24.2	6.2	4.0	10.2	1.6	5.0	17.5	24.0	5.1	2.0
Lolland	33.0	4.5	3.5	9.9	1.1	5.6	16.4	20.2	4.3	1.5
Næstved	26.5	6.9	5.4	11.4	1.8	4.5	13.4	22.5	5.2	2.3
Odsherred	23.7	7.2	5.0	11.8	1.5	4.9	16.0	21.5	5.7	2.8
Ringsted	21.9	8.0	5.7	12.0	1.8	4.0	14.6	23.5	5.8	2.7
Slagelse	24.0	6.9	4.8	11.0	2.0	4.6	15.8	23.5	5.2	2.3
Sorø	21.5	8.0	6.9	13.2	1.7	4.3	13.9	22.3	5.4	2.8
Stevns	21.4	6.4	6.5	11.4	1.9	5.2	15.0	25.2	4.8	2.3
Vordingborg	25.9	7.3	4.6	12.6	1.3	4.6	13.1	21.0	6.3	3.2
Albertslund	24.1	11.4	4.3	17.8	1.2	6.8	10.1	9.1	11.4	3.8
Allerød	15.9	15.2	11.4	13.3	2.4	2.5	7.9	24.8	3.7	2.8
Ballerup	27.8	9.7	5.5	13.9	1.9	4.9	11.9	15.6	5.9	2.9
Bornholm	38.9	4.4	3.3	6.9	1.1	4.4	14.5	18.4	5.1	3.3
Brøndby	28.0	10.9	4.4	12.1	1.2	5.4	14.5	13.2	8.0	2.3
Copenhagen	14.2	16.8	5.0	24.2	1.9	3.7	4.6	10.3	11.7	7.7
Dragør	17.7	11.1	10.1	11.5	2.5	2.9	11.5	27.0	3.2	2.6
Egedal	21.6	10.6	7.5	12.3	2.6	3.4	12.4	23.2	3.8	2.5
Fredensborg	16.3	13.4	10.4	13.7	3.1	3.0	9.2	23.4	4.4	3.1
Frederiksberg	14.7	18.1	9.8	19.8	2.3	2.7	4.9	14.3	7.7	5.7
Frederikssund	22.0	8.6	6.1	12.2	2.0	4.2	14.5	23.3	4.8	2.5
Furesø	17.2	16.5	10.2	14.2	2.6	2.6	6.4	22.2	4.8	3.3
Gentofte	10.6	16.4	17.6	11.4	3.4	2.1	5.5	26.6	3.4	3.1
Gladsaxe	21.9	13.6	6.1	17.7	2.0	4.6	8.5	15.3	6.6	3.7
Glostrup	25.1	9.0	5.6	12.3	1.6	5.2	14.5	18.9	5.4	2.3
Gribskov	17.7	8.4	7.2	12.5	1.9	4.6	13.2	26.5	4.7	3.3
Halsnæs	24.6	6.9	4.8	14.2	1.6	5.2	15.1	19.1	5.9	2.7
Helsingør	19.9	12.1	9.9	13.9	2.1	4.2	10.4	17.7	6.2	3.7
Herlev	26.2	9.1	6.4	14.2	1.5	5.3	11.5	15.0	7.9	2.8
Hillerød	19.3	12.6	8.2	14.2	2.3	3.3	8.8	22.9	5.2	3.3
Hvidovre	24.4	10.8	5.1	16.3	1.3	5.0	13.0	13.7	7.2	3.2
Høje-Taastrup	23.6	11.6	9.4	10.8	1.6	4.7	13.3	16.9	5.6	2.4
Hørsholm	10.5	12.9	19.2	6.8	4.2	1.8	7.6	33.5	1.8	1.7
Ishøj	25.6	13.1	4.6	11.6	1.1	5.0	15.0	13.9	7.9	2.2
Lyngby-Taarbæk	14.9	17.1	12.2	15.7	2.9	2.6	6.2	21.0	4.1	3.3
Rudersdal	11.7	17.0	15.7	10.5	3.8	2.1	5.6	27.8	3.1	2.7
Rødovre	26.5	10.4	5.5	16.0	1.5	4.8	11.2	13.2	7.7	3.3
Tårnby	26.2	8.7	4.8	13.7	1.6	6.0	14.6	16.0	5.9	2.6
Vallensbæk	21.2	11.8	12.8	9.0	1.9	3.3	11.7	20.7	5.4	2.3
