= Results of the 2015 Danish general election in Denmark =

This is a list of the results in the 2015 Danish general election in Denmark. The results are as found on the official website dedicated to the results made by Statistics Denmark.

== Denmark ==
Division	A	B	C	F	I	K	O	V	Ø	Å	Others	Red	Blue
Division	%	%	%	%	%	%	%	%	%	%	%	%	%
Denmark	26.3	4.6	3.4	4.2	7.5	0.8	21.1	19.5	7.8	4.8	0.1	47.6	52.3

== Vote share by electoral division ==
Division	A	B	C	F	I	K	O	V	Ø	Å	Others	Red	Blue
Division	%	%	%	%	%	%	%	%	%	%	%	%	%
Mid & Northern Jutland	27.4	3.8	3.4	3.8	6.9	1.3	20.5	22.5	6.2	4.1	0.1	45.3	54.6
Zealand & Southern Denmark	26.6	3.2	2.8	3.7	6.7	0.6	25.6	20.6	6.6	3.4	0.0	43.6	56.4
Capital	24.6	7.1	4.1	5.2	9.2	0.5	16.2	14.7	11.0	7.2	0.1	55.2	44.7

== Vote share by constituency ==
Division	A	B	C	F	I	K	O	V	Ø	Å	Others	Red	Blue
Division	%	%	%	%	%	%	%	%	%	%	%	%	%
North Jutland	30.0	3.1	2.7	3.3	5.9	0.9	21.9	23.2	6.1	2.8	0.0	45.2	54.7
West Jutland	24.5	2.8	4.9	3.6	5.9	2.3	21.3	27.4	4.5	2.6	0.0	38.0	61.9
East Jutland	27.3	4.9	2.8	4.4	8.3	1.0	18.9	18.7	7.4	6.1	0.2	50.1	49.6
South Jutland	23.5	3.1	2.2	3.0	7.5	1.1	28.4	23.5	5.1	2.6	0.0	37.4	62.6
Funen	28.9	3.4	3.5	4.4	6.5	0.4	21.8	18.2	8.5	4.5	0.0	49.7	50.3
Zealand	27.9	3.2	2.9	3.9	6.2	0.4	25.6	19.6	6.7	3.5	0.0	45.3	54.7
North Zealand	22.6	6.1	5.3	3.9	11.4	0.6	18.8	20.6	6.3	4.5	0.0	43.4	56.6
Greater Copenhagen	29.1	5.4	4.5	4.7	8.4	0.4	20.1	14.8	8.2	4.4	0.2	51.7	48.2
Copenhagen	22.3	9.4	3.1	6.5	8.8	0.4	11.4	10.3	16.4	11.2	0.2	65.8	34.0
Bornholm	33.5	1.6	1.7	2.8	4.0	2.9	19.9	20.3	8.4	5.0	0.0	51.2	48.8

== Vote share by nomination district ==
Division	A	B	C	F	I	K	O	V	Ø	Å	Others	Red	Blue
Division	%	%	%	%	%	%	%	%	%	%	%	%	%
Frederikshavn	31.9	2.0	2.0	2.7	4.4	0.9	26.8	22.1	5.3	1.8	0.0	43.7	56.3
Hjørring	27.7	2.6	5.3	3.7	4.6	0.9	23.7	23.5	5.6	2.3	0.0	41.9	58.1
Brønderslev	30.3	2.2	2.4	3.2	5.0	0.9	23.8	24.9	4.9	2.2	0.0	42.9	57.1
Thisted	31.9	1.8	2.4	2.0	4.2	1.2	21.7	27.6	4.9	2.2	0.0	42.8	57.2
Himmerland	26.1	2.9	3.5	2.9	5.8	0.7	25.2	26.2	4.4	2.2	0.0	38.6	61.3
Mariagerfjord	29.4	2.9	2.2	3.0	5.7	0.7	24.5	23.3	5.4	2.7	0.1	43.4	56.5
Aalborg East	32.1	4.6	2.0	4.3	7.4	1.2	17.9	17.9	8.7	4.0	0.0	53.7	46.3
Aalborg West	28.9	4.4	2.7	3.8	8.1	0.6	16.5	23.6	7.4	3.9	0.0	48.4	51.5
Aalborg North	31.0	4.0	2.1	3.6	7.4	0.8	18.9	20.8	7.7	3.5	0.0	49.9	50.1
Struer	26.1	2.1	4.8	4.4	4.3	1.7	21.6	28.7	4.0	2.3	0.0	38.9	61.1
Skive	30.5	3.1	3.0	2.9	4.9	0.8	20.8	26.9	5.1	2.1	0.0	43.6	56.4
Viborg West	26.3	3.1	8.6	4.9	5.8	0.8	19.2	22.7	5.3	3.2	0.0	42.9	57.1
Viborg East	23.2	2.8	11.8	3.8	5.6	1.3	19.6	25.3	4.0	2.6	0.0	36.4	63.6
Silkeborg North	24.2	3.2	4.6	3.8	6.8	1.9	21.3	25.1	5.2	3.9	0.0	40.3	59.7
Silkeborg South	26.9	4.3	4.3	4.7	8.3	0.9	17.9	20.8	6.8	5.2	0.0	47.8	52.2
Ikast	21.6	2.1	3.4	2.4	5.4	2.1	27.5	29.7	3.7	2.0	0.0	31.8	68.1
Herning South	21.6	3.0	3.6	3.4	7.7	2.9	22.4	28.9	4.4	2.3	0.0	34.6	65.3
Herning North	19.8	2.7	3.5	2.8	6.5	4.3	22.8	32.4	3.3	1.8	0.0	30.5	69.5
Holstebro	29.3	2.8	3.5	3.5	5.7	2.0	20.6	26.3	4.1	2.2	0.1	41.8	58.0
Ringkøbing	19.2	1.9	3.1	2.8	4.6	6.5	22.4	34.7	3.1	1.7	0.0	28.8	71.2
Aarhus South	27.2	6.7	3.3	5.0	9.8	0.7	13.0	17.8	8.1	8.1	0.3	55.2	44.6
Aarhus West	30.3	5.3	2.8	4.9	7.0	1.2	16.4	14.8	9.8	7.1	0.4	57.5	42.1
Aarhus North	27.4	7.8	2.6	5.8	8.8	1.6	11.7	13.7	10.9	9.2	0.4	61.2	38.4
Aarhus East	23.3	8.5	3.4	5.1	11.6	0.8	10.0	16.8	9.5	10.6	0.3	57.1	42.6
Djurs	27.2	2.5	2.3	4.9	5.9	0.5	24.9	20.8	5.8	5.0	0.1	45.4	54.5
Randers North	33.2	2.3	2.3	3.1	5.7	0.8	23.8	19.2	6.8	2.6	0.2	48.0	51.8
Randers South	29.8	2.7	2.6	3.0	7.0	1.2	23.2	20.5	6.4	3.4	0.2	45.3	54.5
Favrskov	27.4	4.3	3.2	3.7	6.8	0.7	22.4	22.7	5.0	3.8	0.1	44.1	55.8
Skanderborg	28.1	4.5	3.1	4.1	7.8	0.6	18.5	21.4	5.8	6.0	0.1	48.4	51.5
Horsens	26.6	3.5	2.5	3.7	9.8	0.6	24.7	18.5	6.6	3.5	0.2	43.9	56.0
Hedensted	21.7	2.5	2.2	2.4	8.2	2.4	30.3	24.2	3.8	2.3	0.1	32.7	67.2
Sønderborg	25.3	4.3	1.8	2.4	7.2	0.5	30.4	21.5	4.3	2.2	0.0	38.5	61.5
Aabenraa	21.9	3.3	1.8	2.3	7.0	1.0	31.8	24.5	4.5	2.0	0.0	34.0	66.0
Tønder	21.3	2.6	2.0	2.4	7.3	1.7	29.4	26.7	4.6	2.1	0.0	32.9	67.1
City of Esbjerg	28.1	2.8	1.8	3.7	6.6	0.7	26.2	18.3	9.1	2.7	0.0	46.4	53.6
Greater Esbjerg	23.3	2.6	2.3	3.3	7.3	0.9	26.3	26.1	5.4	2.5	0.0	37.1	62.9
Varde	18.7	2.4	1.6	2.3	6.7	1.5	28.5	32.7	3.7	1.9	0.0	29.0	71.0
Vejen	21.2	2.1	2.1	2.4	7.2	1.2	30.0	28.3	3.6	1.9	0.0	31.2	68.8
Vejle North	21.5	3.9	2.4	3.1	8.2	1.5	28.8	22.5	4.5	3.6	0.0	36.6	63.4
Vejle South	24.5	4.1	2.1	3.7	8.9	1.2	26.2	20.2	5.4	3.6	0.0	41.3	58.7
Fredericia	28.0	2.5	2.0	3.4	6.7	0.8	29.8	17.5	6.1	3.1	0.0	43.2	56.8
Kolding North	22.7	4.0	3.1	4.4	9.8	0.7	23.6	23.4	5.2	3.1	0.0	39.4	60.6
Kolding South	22.9	3.3	3.4	4.1	8.3	1.3	27.8	21.1	4.6	3.1	0.0	38.0	62.0
Haderslev	24.3	2.8	2.2	2.6	7.0	1.4	28.3	23.9	5.0	2.5	0.0	37.2	62.8
Odense East	30.1	4.6	2.8	5.7	7.7	0.5	17.5	12.5	12.7	5.9	0.0	59.0	41.0
Odense West	30.6	3.7	3.7	5.1	7.3	0.4	20.7	15.1	8.8	4.6	0.0	52.8	47.2
Odense South	26.5	5.0	4.5	4.9	8.8	0.6	17.5	18.7	8.5	5.1	0.0	50.0	50.0
Assens	28.8	2.6	3.1	3.5	6.1	0.4	24.9	20.2	6.8	3.5	0.0	45.2	54.8
Middelfart	29.2	2.8	3.3	3.7	6.1	0.4	24.7	21.2	5.6	2.9	0.0	44.3	55.7
Nyborg	33.4	2.1	2.9	4.0	5.2	0.4	23.9	18.5	6.7	3.1	0.0	49.2	50.8
Svendborg	26.4	2.9	3.1	4.2	5.2	0.3	23.2	17.6	10.7	6.3	0.0	50.5	49.5
Faaborg	26.7	2.8	4.3	4.0	5.2	0.4	23.3	22.0	7.3	4.1	0.0	44.9	55.1
Lolland	35.6	1.3	3.4	4.1	3.0	0.3	25.9	16.5	7.4	2.4	0.0	50.9	49.1
Guldborgsund	31.9	2.0	2.4	3.3	3.8	0.5	29.1	17.0	7.2	2.8	0.0	47.2	52.8
Vordingborg	29.8	2.4	2.4	3.7	4.8	0.3	25.0	18.7	7.8	4.9	0.0	48.6	51.3
Næstved	32.9	2.2	2.9	3.2	6.6	0.4	24.6	17.8	6.3	3.0	0.0	47.6	52.4
Faxe	25.0	2.5	3.3	4.0	6.3	0.4	28.6	20.5	6.2	3.2	0.1	40.9	59.0
Køge	25.0	3.8	2.9	6.4	7.2	0.3	23.7	21.4	5.9	3.4	0.1	44.4	55.5
Greve	23.9	3.4	3.1	2.7	9.1	0.3	26.0	24.5	4.7	2.3	0.0	37.0	62.9
Roskilde	26.0	6.0	3.3	5.4	8.2	0.4	18.7	19.1	7.7	5.2	0.0	50.3	49.7
Holbæk	28.0	4.4	3.1	3.3	6.1	0.4	23.4	19.9	7.8	3.6	0.0	47.1	52.9
Kalundborg	27.4	2.5	2.3	3.2	4.6	0.3	29.5	19.5	7.0	3.6	0.0	43.8	56.2
Ringsted	26.0	3.5	3.3	3.9	6.3	0.5	26.5	19.4	6.8	3.9	0.0	44.0	55.9
Slagelse	27.4	3.0	2.4	3.2	6.3	0.4	28.2	19.3	6.8	3.0	0.0	43.4	56.6
Helsingør	25.3	5.3	6.2	4.0	9.6	0.4	21.0	14.5	8.2	5.4	0.0	48.3	51.7
Fredensborg	18.5	7.0	7.6	3.2	15.2	0.4	15.9	23.1	4.9	4.0	0.0	37.8	62.2
Hillerød	22.3	5.0	3.5	4.1	9.3	1.4	21.2	21.4	6.8	4.9	0.0	43.1	56.8
Frederikssund	26.5	3.1	2.7	4.7	6.5	0.4	25.0	19.6	7.3	4.0	0.0	45.6	54.3
Egedal	24.6	7.0	4.7	3.8	11.1	0.4	17.5	20.5	6.1	4.3	0.0	45.8	54.2
Rudersdal	18.1	9.0	7.6	3.4	16.9	0.3	12.1	23.1	4.9	4.5	0.0	39.9	60.1
Gentofte	17.4	9.1	10.1	3.2	17.5	0.3	10.5	21.3	5.2	5.3	0.0	40.2	59.7
Lyngby	23.3	9.0	7.0	4.6	12.5	0.4	12.4	18.4	6.6	5.8	0.1	49.3	50.6
Gladsaxe	29.8	6.7	3.1	5.4	7.7	0.5	17.5	13.7	10.0	5.6	0.1	57.5	42.4
Rødovre	33.8	3.8	2.9	5.0	5.6	0.7	22.2	12.2	9.6	4.1	0.1	56.3	43.6
Hvidovre	31.8	3.6	2.4	5.1	5.7	0.4	25.4	12.3	9.2	3.7	0.4	53.5	46.2
Brøndby	33.0	3.3	2.9	4.9	5.6	0.3	25.8	13.1	7.7	2.8	0.3	51.8	47.8
Taastrup	30.2	3.8	4.0	5.4	5.3	0.4	23.9	12.9	9.8	4.1	0.2	53.3	46.5
Ballerup	34.3	3.5	2.4	4.2	6.0	0.5	24.1	13.9	7.6	3.5	0.1	53.1	46.8
Easterbro	23.0	11.0	3.3	6.3	11.0	0.4	8.3	11.5	13.9	11.1	0.1	65.2	34.6
Sundvester	22.5	9.2	2.4	6.4	9.7	0.4	12.1	10.5	15.7	11.0	0.2	64.7	35.1
Indre By	19.3	11.9	3.7	6.1	12.2	0.2	5.7	11.3	16.2	13.3	0.2	66.7	33.1
Sundbyøster	22.6	8.3	2.3	6.6	8.3	0.4	13.6	10.1	16.6	11.0	0.3	65.0	34.7
Nørrebro	17.5	11.0	1.5	7.5	6.3	0.3	5.4	5.9	26.5	17.9	0.3	80.3	19.4
Bispebjerg	22.4	7.9	2.1	6.8	6.5	0.6	12.0	7.3	22.0	12.1	0.3	71.2	28.5
Brønshøj	25.5	7.5	2.7	7.8	6.9	0.5	14.4	9.8	15.9	8.7	0.2	65.3	34.4
Valby	25.3	8.0	2.6	6.9	7.9	0.5	13.9	9.8	15.8	8.9	0.3	64.9	34.8
Vesterbro	19.7	10.7	1.9	7.3	8.1	0.2	7.9	7.4	20.8	15.8	0.2	74.3	25.5
Falkoner	21.4	12.4	5.9	6.0	10.8	0.3	8.2	12.4	12.0	10.5	0.2	62.3	37.5
Slots	22.2	9.7	5.9	5.6	10.6	0.4	11.2	13.2	12.3	8.7	0.2	58.5	41.3
Tårnby	27.3	4.0	3.5	4.2	7.0	0.3	27.0	15.6	7.4	3.5	0.1	46.6	53.3
Rønne	36.8	1.6	1.9	2.7	3.6	2.5	20.2	18.7	7.7	4.3	0.0	53.1	46.9
Aakirkeby	30.3	1.7	1.5	2.8	4.4	3.2	19.6	21.8	9.0	5.7	0.0	49.5	50.5

== Vote share by region ==
Division	A	B	C	F	I	K	O	V	Ø	Å	Others	Red	Blue
Division	%	%	%	%	%	%	%	%	%	%	%	%	%
North Denmark	30.0	3.1	2.7	3.3	5.9	0.9	21.9	23.2	6.1	2.8	0.0	45.2	54.7
Central Denmark	26.2	4.1	3.6	4.0	7.3	1.5	19.9	22.2	6.2	4.7	0.1	45.3	54.6
Southern Denmark	25.7	3.2	2.7	3.6	7.1	0.8	25.6	21.3	6.5	3.4	0.0	42.5	57.5
Zealand	27.9	3.2	2.9	3.9	6.2	0.4	25.6	19.6	6.7	3.5	0.0	45.3	54.7
Capital	24.6	7.1	4.1	5.2	9.2	0.5	16.2	14.7	11.0	7.2	0.1	55.2	44.7

== Vote share by municipality ==
Division	A	B	C	F	I	K	O	V	Ø	Å	Others	Red	Blue
Division	%	%	%	%	%	%	%	%	%	%	%	%	%
Frederikshavn	32.0	2.0	2.1	2.7	4.5	0.9	26.7	22.1	5.3	1.8	0.0	43.8	56.2
Læsø	28.1	2.0	1.4	2.2	3.4	1.5	29.5	23.8	5.4	2.8	0.0	40.4	59.6
Hjørring	27.7	2.6	5.3	3.7	4.6	0.9	23.7	23.5	5.6	2.3	0.0	41.9	58.1
Brønderslev	29.6	2.4	3.0	3.8	5.1	1.0	22.7	24.5	5.7	2.1	0.0	43.7	56.3
Jammerbugt	31.0	2.0	1.9	2.6	5.0	0.8	24.8	25.2	4.3	2.3	0.0	42.2	57.8
Thisted	30.7	1.9	2.8	2.0	4.2	1.4	21.6	28.0	4.9	2.4	0.0	41.9	58.0
Morsø	34.5	1.7	1.6	2.0	4.3	0.7	22.0	26.7	4.7	1.8	0.0	44.7	55.3
Vesthimmerland Municipality	24.7	2.1	4.2	2.9	5.0	0.8	27.5	27.0	4.1	1.8	0.0	35.5	64.4
Rebild	28.0	3.9	2.6	2.9	6.7	0.7	22.3	25.2	4.9	2.8	0.0	42.4	57.5
Mariagerfjord	29.4	2.9	2.2	3.0	5.7	0.7	24.5	23.3	5.4	2.7	0.1	43.4	56.5
Aalborg	30.8	4.3	2.2	3.9	7.6	0.9	17.8	20.6	8.0	3.8	0.0	50.9	49.1
Lemvig	23.5	2.1	5.4	4.4	4.3	2.1	21.4	31.4	3.2	2.2	0.0	35.4	64.5
Struer	28.6	2.0	4.2	4.4	4.4	1.3	21.7	26.1	4.8	2.3	0.1	42.2	57.7
Skive	30.5	3.1	3.0	2.9	4.9	0.8	20.8	26.9	5.1	2.1	0.0	43.6	56.4
Viborg	24.9	3.0	10.1	4.4	5.7	1.0	19.4	23.9	4.7	2.9	0.0	39.9	60.1
Silkeborg	25.6	3.8	4.5	4.2	7.6	1.4	19.5	22.8	6.0	4.6	0.0	44.2	55.8
Ikast-Brande	21.6	2.1	3.4	2.4	5.4	2.1	27.5	29.7	3.7	2.0	0.0	31.8	68.1
Herning	20.7	2.9	3.5	3.1	7.0	3.6	22.6	30.7	3.9	2.0	0.0	32.5	67.5
Holstebro	29.3	2.8	3.5	3.5	5.7	2.0	20.6	26.3	4.1	2.2	0.1	41.8	58.0
Ringkøbing-Skjern	19.2	1.9	3.1	2.8	4.6	6.5	22.4	34.7	3.1	1.7	0.0	28.8	71.2
Aarhus	26.9	7.2	3.0	5.2	9.4	1.1	12.6	15.8	9.6	8.8	0.4	57.7	41.9
Municipality	25.2	3.1	2.6	6.1	6.9	0.4	23.3	20.6	5.6	6.1	0.1	46.1	53.8
Municipality	29.5	1.8	1.9	3.6	4.9	0.5	26.8	21.1	6.1	3.8	0.1	44.7	55.2
Randers	31.4	2.5	2.4	3.1	6.4	1.0	23.5	19.9	6.6	3.0	0.2	46.6	53.2
Favrskov	27.4	4.3	3.2	3.7	6.8	0.7	22.4	22.7	5.0	3.8	0.1	44.1	55.8
Odder	29.9	3.7	2.9	4.0	6.5	0.6	17.4	22.5	5.9	6.4	0.1	49.9	50.0
Samsø	28.0	2.3	4.4	4.7	5.1	0.3	18.1	21.5	8.2	7.5	0.0	50.7	49.3
Skanderborg	27.3	4.9	3.0	4.0	8.5	0.6	19.0	21.0	5.6	5.8	0.1	47.7	52.2
Horsens	26.6	3.5	2.5	3.7	9.8	0.6	24.7	18.5	6.6	3.5	0.2	43.9	56.0
Hedensted	21.7	2.5	2.2	2.4	8.2	2.4	30.3	24.2	3.8	2.3	0.1	32.7	67.2
Sønderborg	25.3	4.3	1.8	2.4	7.2	0.5	30.4	21.5	4.3	2.2	0.0	38.5	61.5
Aabenraa	21.9	3.3	1.8	2.3	7.0	1.0	31.8	24.5	4.5	2.0	0.0	34.0	66.0
Tønder	21.3	2.6	2.0	2.4	7.3	1.7	29.4	26.7	4.6	2.1	0.0	32.9	67.1
Esbjerg	25.8	2.7	2.0	3.5	7.0	0.8	26.4	22.0	7.3	2.5	0.0	41.8	58.2
Fanø	27.1	3.2	3.4	5.2	6.2	0.3	20.0	18.9	10.2	5.5	0.0	51.2	48.8
Varde	18.7	2.4	1.6	2.3	6.7	1.5	28.5	32.7	3.7	1.9	0.0	29.0	71.0
Vejen	22.4	2.1	2.3	2.5	7.4	0.8	28.5	28.1	3.9	1.9	0.0	32.8	67.2
Billund	19.4	2.2	1.7	2.2	6.7	1.8	32.4	28.7	3.2	1.7	0.0	28.7	71.3
Vejle	23.0	4.0	2.3	3.4	8.5	1.3	27.5	21.3	5.0	3.6	0.0	39.0	61.0
Fredericia	28.0	2.5	2.0	3.4	6.7	0.8	29.8	17.5	6.1	3.1	0.0	43.2	56.8
Kolding	22.8	3.6	3.3	4.3	9.0	1.0	25.9	22.2	4.9	3.1	0.0	38.7	61.3
Haderslev	24.3	2.8	2.2	2.6	7.0	1.4	28.3	23.9	5.0	2.5	0.0	37.2	62.8
Odense	29.0	4.5	3.7	5.2	8.0	0.5	18.4	15.5	10.0	5.2	0.0	53.9	46.1
Assens	28.8	2.6	3.1	3.5	6.1	0.4	24.9	20.2	6.8	3.5	0.0	45.2	54.8
Middelfart	29.4	3.4	3.2	4.1	6.6	0.5	23.4	20.3	5.7	3.3	0.0	46.0	54.0
Nordfyn	29.0	1.9	3.4	3.2	5.5	0.3	26.3	22.4	5.5	2.4	0.0	42.0	58.0
Nyborg	33.5	2.2	2.6	3.4	5.1	0.3	23.8	19.0	6.9	3.2	0.0	49.2	50.8
Kerteminde	33.3	2.0	3.3	4.7	5.3	0.4	23.9	18.0	6.4	2.9	0.0	49.2	50.8
Svendborg	26.4	3.2	3.4	4.3	5.7	0.3	22.3	16.6	11.1	6.7	0.0	51.7	48.3
Langeland	26.2	1.8	2.0	3.8	3.2	0.3	27.0	22.3	9.1	4.3	0.0	45.2	54.8
Faaborg-Midtfyn	27.3	2.9	2.9	4.1	5.4	0.4	23.4	22.4	7.1	4.0	0.0	45.4	54.6
Ærø	22.6	1.6	14.4	3.0	3.6	0.4	22.1	18.6	8.5	5.2	0.0	40.9	59.1
Lolland	35.6	1.3	3.4	4.1	3.0	0.3	25.9	16.5	7.4	2.4	0.0	50.9	49.1
Guldborgsund	31.9	2.0	2.4	3.3	3.8	0.5	29.1	17.0	7.2	2.8	0.0	47.2	52.8
Vordingborg	29.8	2.4	2.4	3.7	4.8	0.3	25.0	18.7	7.8	4.9	0.0	48.6	51.3
Næstved	32.9	2.2	2.9	3.2	6.6	0.4	24.6	17.8	6.3	3.0	0.0	47.6	52.4
Faxe	25.1	2.5	3.0	3.9	6.4	0.4	28.8	20.4	6.4	3.0	0.1	40.9	59.0
Stevns	24.8	2.5	3.6	4.1	6.0	0.4	28.4	20.6	6.0	3.6	0.0	41.0	58.9
Køge	25.6	3.5	3.0	6.5	7.2	0.3	24.7	20.7	5.6	2.7	0.1	44.0	55.9
Lejre	23.8	4.4	2.8	6.0	7.2	0.4	21.6	22.6	6.5	4.7	0.1	45.4	54.6
Greve	24.3	3.3	2.9	2.7	8.1	0.4	26.9	24.2	4.9	2.2	0.1	37.4	62.5
Solrød	22.9	3.7	3.3	2.9	11.2	0.2	23.9	25.1	4.2	2.5	0.0	36.2	63.8
Roskilde	26.0	6.0	3.3	5.4	8.2	0.4	18.7	19.1	7.7	5.2	0.0	50.3	49.7
Holbæk	28.0	4.4	3.1	3.3	6.1	0.4	23.4	19.9	7.8	3.6	0.0	47.1	52.9
Kalundborg	26.6	2.5	2.1	3.2	4.8	0.3	30.9	20.0	6.7	3.0	0.0	41.9	58.0
Odsherred	28.7	2.5	2.5	3.2	4.4	0.2	27.6	18.9	7.5	4.5	0.1	46.4	53.6
Ringsted	26.3	3.6	2.6	3.5	6.8	0.4	26.8	19.5	6.8	3.7	0.0	44.0	56.0
Sorø	25.7	3.4	4.1	4.2	5.7	0.6	26.1	19.3	6.7	4.1	0.1	44.1	55.9
Slagelse	27.4	3.0	2.4	3.2	6.3	0.4	28.2	19.3	6.8	3.0	0.0	43.4	56.6
Helsingør	25.3	5.3	6.2	4.0	9.6	0.4	21.0	14.5	8.2	5.4	0.0	48.3	51.7
Fredensborg	21.2	7.1	5.6	4.1	12.0	0.5	17.6	20.6	6.4	4.9	0.1	43.7	56.3
Hørsholm	14.6	6.9	10.6	1.9	20.0	0.2	13.3	26.9	2.8	2.7	0.0	28.9	71.1
Hillerød	23.8	6.2	4.0	4.6	9.8	1.4	17.3	20.8	7.0	4.9	0.0	46.6	53.4
Gribskov	20.6	3.6	2.9	3.5	8.7	1.4	25.6	22.1	6.4	5.0	0.0	39.2	60.8
Frederikssund	25.3	3.7	3.0	4.3	7.1	0.4	24.4	21.5	6.7	3.7	0.1	43.6	56.4
Halsnæs	28.3	2.3	2.3	5.4	5.8	0.5	25.8	17.0	8.2	4.4	0.0	48.7	51.3
Egedal	24.9	5.1	4.1	3.5	9.9	0.3	22.1	21.8	5.0	3.3	0.0	41.7	58.2
Furesø	24.3	9.2	5.5	4.2	12.4	0.4	12.4	19.1	7.4	5.3	0.0	50.3	49.7
Rudersdal	16.5	9.5	7.7	3.0	18.9	0.3	10.9	23.7	4.8	4.7	0.0	38.5	61.4
Allerød	21.6	8.1	7.3	4.2	12.6	0.5	15.0	21.8	5.0	3.9	0.0	42.8	57.2
Gentofte	17.4	9.1	10.1	3.2	17.5	0.3	10.5	21.3	5.2	5.3	0.0	40.2	59.7
Lyngby-Taarbæk	23.3	9.0	7.0	4.6	12.5	0.4	12.4	18.4	6.6	5.8	0.1	49.3	50.6
Gladsaxe	29.8	6.7	3.1	5.4	7.7	0.5	17.5	13.7	10.0	5.6	0.1	57.5	42.4
Rødovre	33.8	3.9	2.7	5.1	5.5	0.6	22.4	11.9	9.7	4.2	0.1	56.7	43.1
Herlev	33.8	3.6	3.3	4.9	5.7	0.8	21.8	12.6	9.4	3.9	0.1	55.7	44.2
Hvidovre	31.8	3.6	2.4	5.1	5.7	0.4	25.4	12.3	9.2	3.7	0.4	53.5	46.2
Brøndby	35.3	3.2	1.6	4.6	4.5	0.3	26.7	11.3	9.0	3.0	0.5	55.2	44.4
Ishøj	34.1	3.0	1.8	6.3	4.7	0.3	26.8	12.1	7.7	3.0	0.3	54.1	45.6
Vallensbæk	26.9	3.9	7.1	4.0	9.2	0.3	22.9	18.3	5.0	2.4	0.1	42.2	57.7
Høje-Taastrup	29.1	3.5	5.0	4.4	6.0	0.4	25.6	15.4	7.1	3.4	0.1	47.5	52.4
Albertslund	32.2	4.3	2.3	7.3	4.0	0.4	20.8	8.5	14.7	5.4	0.3	63.8	35.9
Ballerup	35.6	3.6	2.3	4.4	5.8	0.6	23.0	13.1	7.7	3.7	0.1	55.1	44.8
Glostrup	31.3	3.2	2.5	3.8	6.4	0.3	26.4	15.5	7.3	3.1	0.2	48.6	51.2
Copenhagen	21.9	9.6	2.5	6.9	8.6	0.4	10.2	9.3	18.2	12.3	0.2	68.8	30.9
Frederiksberg	21.8	11.1	5.9	5.8	10.7	0.3	9.6	12.8	12.1	9.6	0.2	60.5	39.3
Tårnby	29.2	3.6	2.6	4.6	5.4	0.3	28.9	13.4	8.4	3.4	0.1	49.2	50.7
Dragør	22.0	5.2	5.9	3.1	11.6	0.1	21.5	21.9	4.9	3.8	0.1	39.0	60.9
Bornholm	33.5	1.6	1.7	2.8	4.0	2.9	19.9	20.3	8.4	5.0	0.0	51.2	48.8
