= Jeppe Kofod =

Danish politician (born 1974)

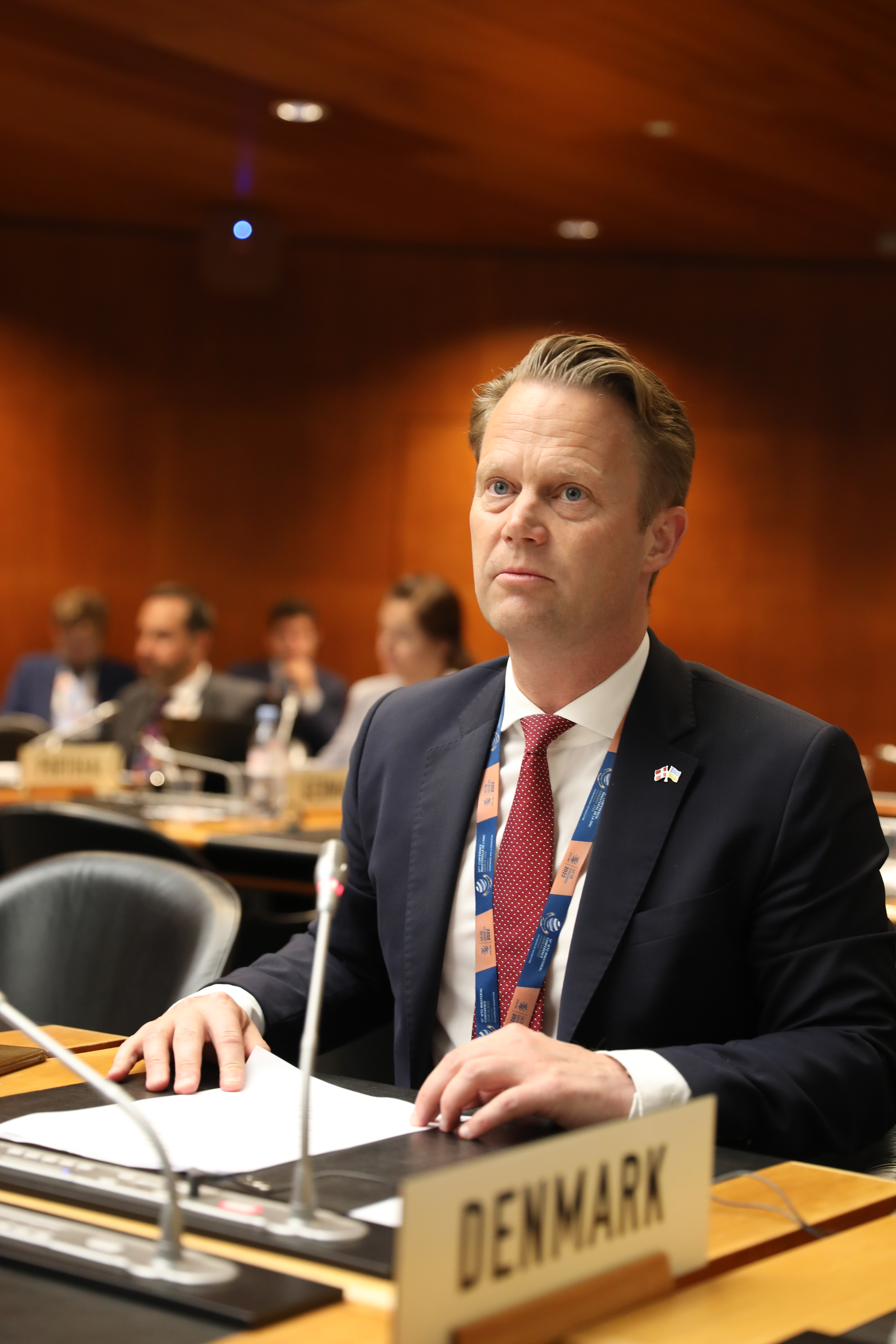

Minister for Foreign Affairs
- In office 27 June 2019 – 15 December 2022
- Prime Minister: Mette Frederiksen
- Preceded by: Anders Samuelsen
- Succeeded by: Lars Løkke Rasmussen

Vice President of the Progressive Alliance of Socialists and Democrats
- Incumbent
- Assumed office 14 December 2016
- President: Sergei Stanishev
- Preceded by: Position established

Member of the European Parliament for Denmark
- In office 1 July 2014 – 27 June 2019
- Preceded by: Dan Jørgensen
- Succeeded by: Marianne Vind

Member of the Folketing for Bornholm
- In office 11 March 1998 – 30 June 2014
- Preceded by: Eva Fatum
- Succeeded by: Lea Wermelin

Personal details
- Born: Jeppe Sebastian Kofod; 14 March 1974 (age 52) Copenhagen, Denmark
- Party: Social Democrats
- Other political affiliations: Progressive Alliance of Socialists and Democrats
- Education: Roskilde University; Harvard University
- Website: Official website

Jeppe Sebastian Kofod (born 14 March 1974) is a Danish former politician of the Social Democratic Party who served as Minister of Foreign Affairs of Denmark between 27 June 2019 to 15 December 2022.

Kofod previously served as a Member of the European Parliament (MEP) from 2014 to 2019. Within the Party of European Socialists group, he led the Social Democrats from Denmark. Kofod was a member of the Folketing (the Danish Parliament) from the Social Democrats from 1998 until 2014 and again briefly as a substitute member for two months in 2023.

== Education ==
From 2006 to 2007 Kofod completed a Master in Public Administration at Harvard University's John F. Kennedy School of Government.

== Political career ==
=== Member of the Danish Parliament, 1998–2014 ===
Jeppe Kofod was a member of the Danish Parliament, the Folketing, first elected after the 1998 Danish general election for the constituency of Bornholm. During his time in the Danish Parliament he was chairman of the Committee on Foreign Affairs.

At Easter in 2008, the then 34-year-old Jeppe Kofod appeared in the media because it emerged that in the evening after giving a lecture for the Social Democratic Youth of Denmark (DSU), he had sex with a 15-year-old girl from DSU. Denmark's age of consent is 15. Kofod commented at the time that he had shown a 'lack of judgment' in having a 'morally inappropriate relationship'. The episode led, among other things, to Kofod resigning from his committee posts and his post as foreign affairs spokesman for the Social Democrats. The chairman of DSU, Jacob Bjerregaard, stated that Kofod had violated DSU's rules and that he was no longer welcome in DSU.

=== Member of the European Parliament, 2014–2019 ===
Kofod was the head of the Danish Socialists and Democrats' delegation and vice-president of the Progressive Alliance of Socialists and Democrats in the European Parliament. Serving his first term, he was elected to the European Parliament at the 2014 European Parliament election, with a total of 170.739 personal votes. He was re-elected in 2019.

During his time in the European Parliament, Kofod served on the following Committees and Delegations:

- Vice-chair, European Parliament Delegation for Relations with the United States
- Rapporteur, European Parliament Special Committee on Tax Rulings and Other Measures Similar in Nature or Effect (TAXE 2)
- Member, European Parliament Committee on Industry, Research and Energy
- Substitute, European Parliament Committee on Economic and Monetary Affairs
- Substitute, European Parliament Delegation for relations with the NATO Parliamentary Assembly

In addition to his committee assignments, Kofod was a member of the following intergroups in the European Parliament:

- European Forum for Renewable Energy Sources (EUFORES)
- Intergroup on the Welfare and Conservation of Animals
- Intergroup on LGBTI Rights

Kofod was also a supporter of the MEP Heart Group, a group of parliamentarians who have an interest in promoting measures that help reduce the burden of cardiovascular diseases (CVD). He sat on the executive committee of the Association of European Parliamentarians with Africa (AWEPA).

Following the 2019 elections, Kofod was part of a cross-party working group in charge of drafting the European Parliament's four-year work program on foreign policy.

=== Minister of Foreign Affairs, 2019–2022 ===
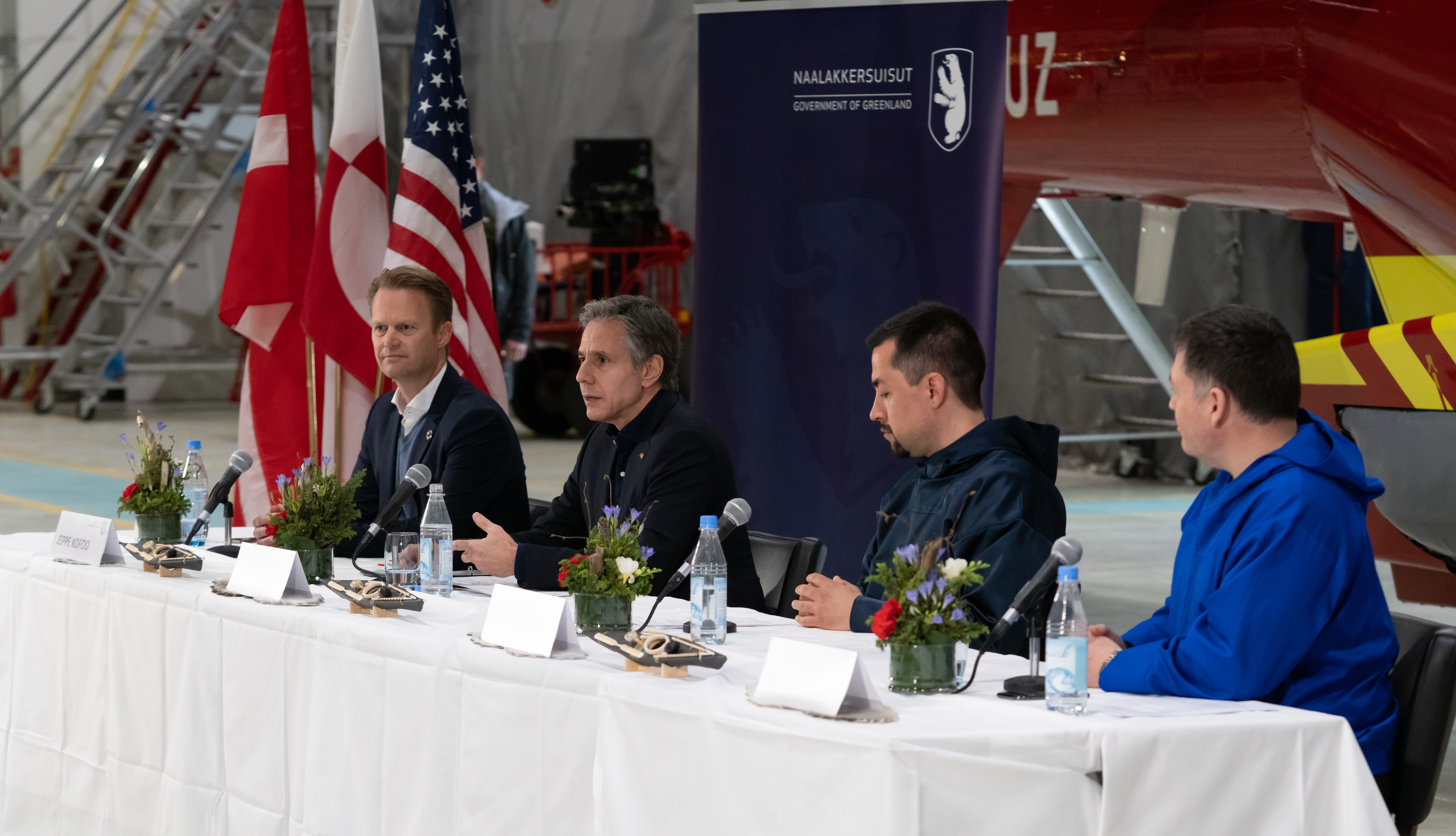
Kofod (far left) meeting with (from left to right) US Secretary of State Antony Blinken, Greenlandic premier Múte Bourup Egede, and Greenlandic foreign minister Pele Broberg in Kangerlussuaq, Greenland in 2021

On 27 June 2019, Kofod was named minister for foreign affairs in the Frederiksen Cabinet.

Early during his tenure, Kofod and Frederiksen faced a diplomatic incident when U.S. president Donald Trump confirmed his interest in buying Greenland from Denmark; at the time, Kofod said the island could not be bought "in dollars, yuan or roubles". He later approved the establishment of a U.S. consulate in Greenland's capital Nuuk, which was widely seen as part of a broader move by the U.S. to expand its diplomatic and commercial presence in Greenland and the Arctic. In 2020, he welcomed a $12.1 million economic aid package from the U.S. government for Greenland.

Following the Bucha massacre in April 2022, Kofod expelled 15 Russian diplomats and embassy staff from Copenhagen, joining other European Union countries in its response to alleged war crimes by Russian troops in Ukraine.

In June 2022, Kofod summoned the Russian ambassador when a Russian warship twice violated Danish territorial waters north of the Baltic Sea island of Bornholm where a democracy festival attended by senior officials and business people – including Prime Minister Frederiksen – was taking place.

At the 2022 Danish general election in November 2022 Kofod was not elected to the Folketing, and when a new government was formed in December, he was replaced by former prime minister Lars Løkke Rasmussen.

Kofod was a substitute member of Folketinget for a couple of months from 28 February 2023, replacing Mette Gjerskov, who was on leave of absence because of disease. Kofod withdrew from the position on 1 May, retiring from politics altogether. When Gjerskov died on 12 June 2023, Kofod confirmed again that he did not want to take her seat and become an MF again.

Political offices
Preceded by Anders Samuelsen	Minister for Foreign Affairs; 2019–2022	Succeeded by Lars Løkke Rasmussen
