= Peter Juel-Jensen =

Danish politician

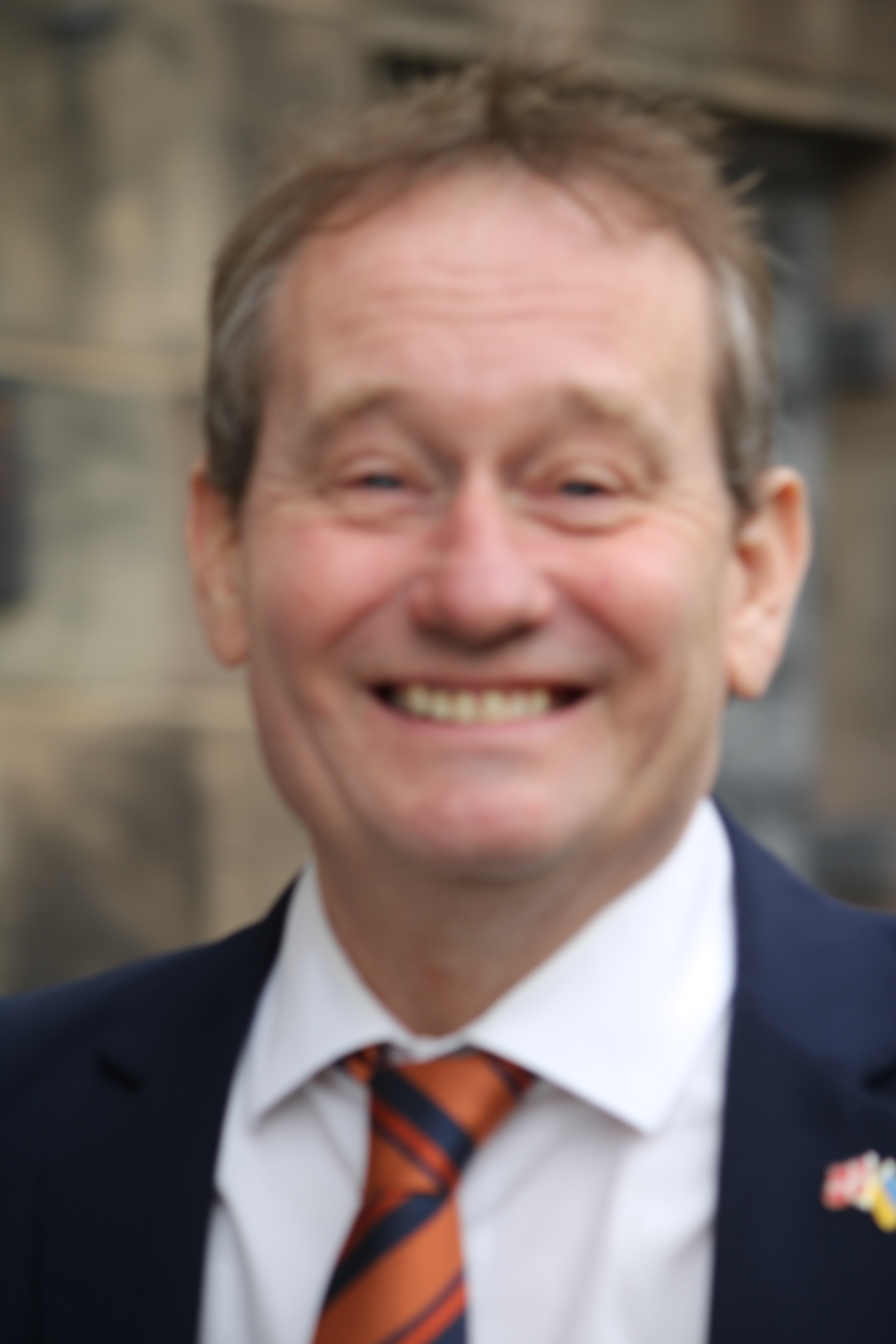
- Juel-Jensen in 2025

Member of the Folketing
- Incumbent
- Assumed office 13 November 2007
- Constituency: Bornholm

Personal details
- Born: 18 May 1966 (age 59) Rønne, Denmark
- Party: Venstre

Peter Juel-Jensen (born 18 May 1966) is a Danish politician, who is a member of the Folketing for the Venstre political party. He was elected into parliament at the 2007 Danish general election.

== Political career ==
Juel-Jensen sat in the municipal council of Aakirkeby Municipality from 2001 to 2002, and of Bornholm Municipality from 2002 to 2007. He was elected into parliament in the 2007 election, and reelected in the 2011, 2015 and 2019 elections.
