= Lea Wermelin =

Danish politician (born 1985)

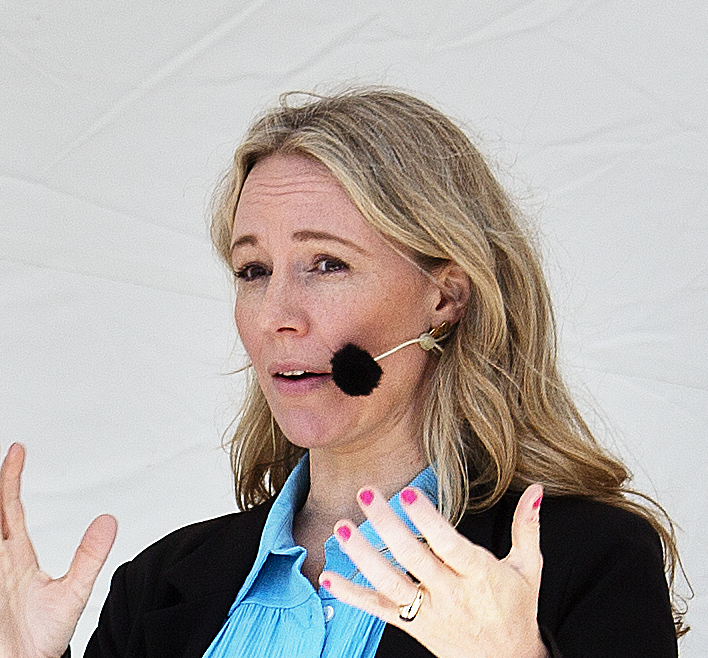

Minister for the Environment
- In office 27 June 2019 – 15 December 2022
- Prime Minister: Mette Frederiksen
- Preceded by: Jakob Ellemann-Jensen
- Succeeded by: Magnus Heunicke

Member of the Folketing
- Incumbent
- Assumed office 18 June 2015
- Constituency: Bornholm

Personal details
- Born: 10 May 1985 (age 41) Rønne, Denmark
- Party: Social Democrats
- Education: University of Copenhagen

Lea Wermelin (born 10 May 1985) is a Danish politician. She has been a member of Folketinget for the Social Democrats from 2015. She was appointed Minister for the Environment in the Frederiksen Cabinet from 27 June 2019.

== Early life ==
Born in Rønne, she is the daughter of schoolteacher Hans Wermelin and nurse Bodil Wermelin. She graduated in political science at the University of Copenhagen.

== Political career ==
Wermelin was elected into parliament in the 2015 Danish general election and re-elected in 2019. She was appointed Minister for the Environment on 27 June 2019.

== Positions ==
The 2021 European Commission's draft guidance of the EU's Biodiversity Strategy said that strictly protected areas should be safeguarded to retain the “non-disturbance or natural processes” upon which they depend. Hunting and fishing in these areas is banned, according to the 2021 draft. Danish hunters and fishers protested against this rules. Wermelin said, “no matter what the final wording is, it is and will be only a guide and therefore not law ... The European Commission does not have — and does not receive with the guidance — authority to ban hunting on Danish soil.”

Political offices
Preceded by Jakob Ellemann-Jensen	Minister for the Environment; 2019–2022	Succeeded by Magnus Heunicke
