= Bornholm (Folketing constituency) =

Constituency of the Folketing, the national legislature of Denmark

- Bornholm
- Constituency for the Folketing
- Location of Bornholm within Denmark
- Municipality: List: Bornholm; Christiansø
- Region: Capital
- Population: 38,769 (2026)
- Electorate: 29,876 (2026)
- Area: 589 km^{2} (2022)

Current constituency
- Created: 2007
- Seats: 2 (2007–present)
- Members of the Folketing: List: Peter Juel-Jensen (V); Lea Wermelin (A)
- Created from: Bornholm County

Bornholm (Danish: Bornholm) is one of the 12 multi-member constituencies of the Folketing, the national legislature of Denmark. The constituency was established in 2007 following the public administration structural reform. It consists of the municipality of Bornholm and the unincorporated archipelago of Christiansø (Ertholmene). The constituency currently elects two of the 179 members of the Folketing using the open party-list proportional representation electoral system. At the 2026 general election it had 29,876 registered electors.

== Electoral system ==
Bornholm currently elects two of the 179 members of the Folketing using the open party-list proportional representation electoral system. Constituency seats are allocated using the D'Hondt method. Compensatory seats are calculated based on the national vote and are allocated using the Sainte-Laguë method, initially at the provincial level and finally at the constituency level. Only parties that reach any one of three thresholds stipulated by section 77 of the Folketing (Parliamentary) Elections Act - winning at least one constituency seat; obtaining at least the Hare quota (valid votes in province/number of constituency seats in province) in two of the three provinces; or obtaining at least 2% of the national vote - compete for compensatory seats.

== Criticism of the electoral system ==
The fact that the people of Bornholm elect 2 members of parliament, even though the size of the population only justifies 1 member of Parliament has led to criticism of the electoral law being undemocratic.

== Election results ==
=== Summary ===
Election	Red–Green Ø			Green Left F			Alternative Å			Social Democrats A			Social Liberals B			Venstre V			Conservative People's C			Liberal Alliance I / Y			Danish People's O		
Election	Votes	%	Seats	Votes	%	Seats	Votes	%	Seats	Votes	%	Seats	Votes	%	Seats	Votes	%	Seats	Votes	%	Seats	Votes	%	Seats	Votes	%	Seats
2026	1,322	5.35%	0	2,764	11.18%	0	438	1.77%	0	7,426	30.04%	1	417	1.69%	0	4,167	16.86%	1	874	3.54%	0	1,200	4.85%	0	2,501	10.12%	0
2022	1,279	5.17%	0	1,590	6.43%	0	663	2.68%	0	8,721	35.28%	1	251	1.02%	0	4,635	18.75%	1	926	3.75%	0	892	3.61%	0	1,550	6.27%	0
2019	2,052	8.12%	0	1,091	4.32%	0	824	3.26%	0	8,593	33.99%	1	846	3.35%	0	6,384	25.25%	1	456	1.80%	0	248	0.98%	0	2,626	10.39%	0
2015	2,175	8.38%	0	716	2.76%	0	1,299	5.01%	0	8,683	33.46%	1	427	1.65%	0	5,257	20.26%	1	441	1.70%	0	1,037	4.00%	0	5,168	19.91%	0
2011	1,992	7.28%	0	2,011	7.35%	0				9,801	35.82%	1	1,509	5.51%	0	7,309	26.71%	1	580	2.12%	0	509	1.86%	0	2,972	10.86%	0
2007	541	1.93%	0	3,328	11.90%	0				9,888	35.36%	1	618	2.21%	0	7,350	26.28%	1	1,688	6.04%	0	617	2.21%	0	3,361	12.02%	0

(Excludes compensatory seats)

=== Detailed ===
==== 2026 ====
Results of the 2026 general election held on 24 March 2026:

Party		Votes per nomination district		Total Votes	%	Seats		
Party		Aakir- keby	Rønne	Total Votes	%	Con.	Com.	Tot.
Social Democrats	A	3,256	3,990	7,426	30.04%	1	0	1
Venstre	V	2,204	1,963	4,167	16.86%	1	0	1
Green Left	F	1,369	1,395	2,764	11.18%	0	0	0
Danish People's Party	O	1,208	1,293	2,501	10.12%	0	0	0
Moderates	M	714	662	1,376	5.57%	0	0	0
Red–Green Alliance	Ø	763	559	1,322	5.35%	0	0	0
Liberal Alliance	I	614	586	1,200	4.85%	0	0	0
Denmark Democrats	Æ	548	453	1,001	4.05%	0	0	0
Conservative People's Party	C	422	452	874	3.54%	0	0	0
The Alternative	Å	279	159	438	1.77%	0	0	0
Citizens' Party	H	206	215	421	1.70%	0	0	0
Danish Social Liberal Party	B	239	178	417	1.69%	0	0	0
Valid votes		11,822	11,905	24,721	100.00%	2	0	2
Blank votes		130	152	282	0.94%			
Rejected votes – other		53	50	103	0.34%			
Total polled		12,005	12,107	24,112	80.71%			
Registered electors		14,709	15,167	29,876				
Turnout		81.62%	79.82%	80.71%				

The following candidates were elected:

- Constituency seats - Peter Juel-Jensen (V), 3,494 votes; and Lea Wermelin (A), 3,837 votes.

==== 2022 ====
Results of the 2022 general election held on 1 November 2022:

Party		Votes per nomination district		Total Votes	%	Seats		
Party		Aakir- keby	Rønne	Total Votes	%	Con.	Com.	Tot.
Social Democrats	A	4,064	4,657	8,721	35.28%	1	0	1
Venstre	V	2,447	2,188	4,635	18.75%	1	0	1
Denmark Democrats	Æ	862	728	1,590	6.43%	0	0	0
Green Left	F	789	801	1,590	6.43%	0	0	0
Danish People's Party	O	739	811	1,550	6.27%	0	0	0
Moderates	M	751	748	1,499	6.06%	0	0	0
Red–Green Alliance	Ø	743	536	1,279	5.17%	0	0	0
Conservative People's Party	C	447	479	926	3.75%	0	0	0
Liberal Alliance	I	457	435	892	3.61%	0	0	0
The Alternative	Å	377	286	663	2.68%	0	0	0
The New Right	D	274	255	529	2.14%	0	0	0
Christian Democrats	K	281	222	503	2.03%	0	0	0
Danish Social Liberal Party	B	145	106	251	1.02%	0	0	0
Independent Greens	Q	25	23	48	0.19%	0	0	0
Charlotte Petersen (Independent)		22	23	45	0.18%	0	0	0
Valid votes		12,423	12,298	24,721	100.00%	2	0	2
Blank votes		166	178	344	1.37%			
Rejected votes – other		59	47	106	0.42%			
Total polled		12,648	12,523	25,171	81.66%			
Registered electors		15,348	15,477	30,825				
Turnout		82.41%	80.91%	81.66%				

Votes per municipality:

Party		Votes per municipality		Total Votes
Party		Born- holm	Christ- iansø	Total Votes
Social Democrats	A	8,702	19	8,721
Venstre	V	4,633	2	4,635
Denmark Democrats	Æ	1,585	5	1,590
Green Left	F	1,582	8	1,590
Danish People's Party	O	1,550	0	1,550
Moderates	M	1,495	4	1,499
Red–Green Alliance	Ø	1,276	3	1,279
Conservative People's Party	C	921	5	926
Liberal Alliance	I	891	1	892
The Alternative	Å	656	7	663
The New Right	D	528	1	529
Christian Democrats	K	502	1	502
Danish Social Liberal Party	B	248	3	251
Independent Greens	Q	48	0	48
Charlotte Petersen (Independent)		45	0	45
Valid votes		24,662	59	24,721
Blank votes		341	3	344
Rejected votes – other		106	0	106
Total polled		25,109	62	25,171
Registered electors		30,758	67	30,825
Turnout		81.63%	92.54%	81.66%

The following candidates were elected:

- Constituency seats - Peter Juel-Jensen (V), 4,493 votes; and Lea Wermelin (A), 3,580 votes.

==== 2019 ====
Results of the 2019 general election held on 5 June 2019:

Party		Votes per nomination district		Total Votes	%	Seats		
Party		Aakir- keby	Rønne	Total Votes	%	Con.	Com.	Tot.
Social Democrats	A	3,965	4,628	8,593	33.99%	1	0	1
Venstre	V	3,410	2,974	6,384	25.25%	1	0	1
Danish People's Party	O	1,353	1,273	2,626	10.39%	0	0	0
Red–Green Alliance	Ø	1,146	906	2,052	8.12%	0	0	0
Socialist People's Party	F	553	538	1,091	4.32%	0	0	0
Christian Democrats	K	547	486	1,033	4.09%	0	0	0
Danish Social Liberal Party	B	437	409	846	3.35%	0	0	0
The Alternative	Å	464	360	824	3.26%	0	0	0
Hard Line	P	215	266	481	1.90%	0	0	0
Conservative People's Party	C	212	244	456	1.80%	0	0	0
The New Right	D	211	217	428	1.69%	0	0	0
Liberal Alliance	I	143	105	248	0.98%	0	0	0
Klaus Riskær Pedersen	E	130	91	221	0.87%	0	0	0
Valid votes		12,786	12,497	25,283	100.00%	2	0	2
Blank votes		82	125	207	0.81%			
Rejected votes – other		29	28	57	0.22%			
Total polled		12,897	12,650	25,547	81.84%			
Registered electors		15,716	15,498	31,214				
Turnout		82.06%	81.62%	81.84%				

Votes per municipality:

Party		Votes per municipality		Total Votes
Party		Born- holm	Christ- iansø	Total Votes
Social Democrats	A	8,573	20	8,593
Venstre	V	6,375	9	6,384
Danish People's Party	O	2,625	1	2,626
Red–Green Alliance	Ø	2,042	10	2,052
Socialist People's Party	F	1,085	6	1,091
Christian Democrats	K	1,033	0	1,033
Danish Social Liberal Party	B	844	2	846
The Alternative	Å	822	2	824
Hard Line	P	479	2	481
Conservative People's Party	C	453	3	456
The New Right	D	428	0	428
Liberal Alliance	I	247	1	248
Klaus Riskær Pedersen	E	221	0	221
Valid votes		25,227	56	25,283
Blank votes		205	2	207
Rejected votes – other		57	0	57
Total polled		25,489	58	25,547
Registered electors		31,154	60	31,214
Turnout		81.82%	96.67%	81.84%

The following candidates were elected:

- Constituency seats - Peter Juel-Jensen (V), 5,962 votes; and Lea Wermelin (A), 7,441 votes.

==== 2015 ====
Results of the 2015 general election held on 18 June 2015:

Party		Votes per nomination district		Total Votes	%	Seats		
Party		Aakir- keby	Rønne	Total Votes	%	Con.	Com.	Tot.
Social Democrats	A	4,007	4,676	8,683	33.46%	1	0	1
Venstre	V	2,882	2,375	5,257	20.26%	1	0	1
Danish People's Party	O	2,594	2,574	5,168	19.91%	0	0	0
Red–Green Alliance	Ø	1,196	979	2,175	8.38%	0	0	0
The Alternative	Å	752	547	1,299	5.01%	0	0	0
Liberal Alliance	I	581	456	1,037	4.00%	0	0	0
Christian Democrats	K	429	320	749	2.89%	0	0	0
Socialist People's Party	F	374	342	716	2.76%	0	0	0
Conservative People's Party	C	197	244	441	1.70%	0	0	0
Danish Social Liberal Party	B	223	204	427	1.65%	0	0	0
Valid votes		13,235	12,717	25,952	100.00%	2	0	2
Blank votes		104	126	230	0.88%			
Rejected votes – other		40	41	81	0.31%			
Total polled		13,379	12,884	26,263	83.54%			
Registered electors		16,011	15,428	31,439				
Turnout		83.56%	83.51%	83.54%				

Votes per municipality:

Party		Votes per municipality		Total Votes
Party		Born- holm	Christ- iansø	Total Votes
Social Democrats	A	8,661	22	8,683
Venstre	V	5,253	4	5,257
Danish People's Party	O	5,155	13	5,168
Red–Green Alliance	Ø	2,170	5	2,175
The Alternative	Å	1,295	4	1,299
Liberal Alliance	I	1,037	0	1,037
Christian Democrats	K	749	0	749
Socialist People's Party	F	711	5	716
Conservative People's Party	C	440	1	441
Danish Social Liberal Party	B	426	1	427
Valid votes		25,897	55	25,952
Blank votes		227	3	230
Rejected votes – other		81	0	81
Total polled		26,205	58	26,263
Registered electors		31,380	59	31,439
Turnout		83.51%	98.31%	83.54%

The following candidates were elected:

- Constituency seats - Peter Juel-Jensen (V), 4,735 votes; and Lea Wermelin (A), 5,599 votes.

==== 2011 ====
Results of the 2011 general election held on 15 September 2011:

Party		Votes per nomination district		Total Votes	%	Seats		
Party		Aakir- keby	Rønne	Total Votes	%	Con.	Com.	Tot.
Social Democrats	A	4,550	5,251	9,801	35.82%	1	0	1
Venstre	V	4,018	3,291	7,309	26.71%	1	0	1
Danish People's Party	O	1,611	1,361	2,972	10.86%	0	0	0
Socialist People's Party	F	1,038	973	2,011	7.35%	0	0	0
Red–Green Alliance	Ø	1,099	893	1,992	7.28%	0	0	0
Danish Social Liberal Party	B	767	742	1,509	5.51%	0	0	0
Christian Democrats	K	400	281	681	2.49%	0	0	0
Conservative People's Party	C	268	312	580	2.12%	0	0	0
Liberal Alliance	I	264	245	509	1.86%	0	0	0
Valid votes		14,015	13,349	27,364	100.00%	2	0	2
Blank votes		84	98	182	0.66%			
Rejected votes – other		43	54	97	0.35%			
Total polled		14,142	13,501	27,643	85.25%			
Registered electors		16,633	15,791	32,424				
Turnout		85.02%	85.50%	85.25%				

Votes per municipality:

Party		Votes per municipality		Total Votes
Party		Born- holm	Christ- iansø	Total Votes
Social Democrats	A	9,788	13	9,801
Venstre	V	7,300	9	7,309
Danish People's Party	O	2,965	7	2,972
Socialist People's Party	F	2,000	11	2,011
Red–Green Alliance	Ø	1,978	14	1,992
Danish Social Liberal Party	B	1,503	6	1,509
Christian Democrats	K	681	0	681
Conservative People's Party	C	579	1	580
Liberal Alliance	I	508	1	509
Valid votes		27,302	62	27,364
Blank votes		180	2	182
Rejected votes – other		97	0	97
Total polled		27,579	64	27,643
Registered electors		32,355	69	32,424
Turnout		85.24%	92.75%	85.25%

The following candidates were elected:

- Constituency seats - Peter Juel-Jensen (V), 6,516 votes; and Jeppe Kofod (A), 9,394 votes.

==== 2007 ====
Results of the 2007 general election held on 13 November 2007:

Party		Votes per nomination district		Total Votes	%	Seats		
Party		Aakir- keby	Rønne	Total Votes	%	Con.	Com.	Tot.
Social Democrats	A	4,617	5,271	9,888	35.36%	1	0	1
Venstre	V	4,221	3,129	7,350	26.28%	1	0	1
Danish People's Party	O	1,772	1,589	3,361	12.02%	0	0	0
Socialist People's Party	F	1,787	1,541	3,328	11.90%	0	0	0
Conservative People's Party	C	866	822	1,688	6.04%	0	0	0
Danish Social Liberal Party	B	310	308	618	2.21%	0	0	0
New Alliance	Y	396	221	617	2.21%	0	0	0
Christian Democrats	K	306	249	555	1.98%	0	0	0
Unity List	Ø	312	229	541	1.93%	0	0	0
Mogens Nebelong (Independent)		9	12	21	0.08%	0	0	0
Valid votes		14,596	13,371	27,967	100.00%	2	0	2
Blank votes		85	91	176	0.62%			
Rejected votes – other		27	30	57	0.20%			
Total polled		14,708	13,492	28,200	85.07%			
Registered electors		17,169	15,981	33,150				
Turnout		85.67%	84.43%	85.07%				

Votes per municipality:

Party		Votes per municipality		Total Votes
Party		Born- holm	Christ- iansø	Total Votes
Social Democrats	A	9,875	13	9,888
Venstre	V	7,341	9	7,350
Danish People's Party	O	3,357	4	3,361
Socialist People's Party	F	3,301	27	3,328
Conservative People's Party	C	1,682	6	1,688
Danish Social Liberal Party	B	617	1	618
New Alliance	Y	615	2	617
Christian Democrats	K	555	0	555
Unity List	Ø	537	4	541
Mogens Nebelong (Independent)		21	0	21
Valid votes		27,901	66	27,967
Blank votes		174	2	176
Rejected votes – other		57	0	57
Total polled		28,132	68	28,200
Registered electors		33,081	69	33,150
Turnout		85.04%	98.55%	85.07%

The following candidates were elected:

- Constituency seats - Peter Juel-Jensen (V), 3,463 votes; and Jeppe Kofod (A), 8,990 votes.
