= Aakirkeby (nomination district) =

Electoral district in Denmark

- Aakirkeby
- Nomination district constituency for the Folketing
- Location of Aakirkeby within Bornholm

- Location of Bornholm within Denmark
- Municipalities: Bornholm
- Constituency: Bornholm
- Electorate: 15,348 (2022)

Current constituency
- Created: 1849 (as constituency); 1920 (as nomination district)

Aakirkeby nominating district is one of the 92 nominating districts that exists for Danish elections following the 2007 municipal reform. It is one of the 2 nominating districts in Bornholm Municipality, the other being Rønne. It was created in 1849 as a constituency, and has been a nomination district since 1920, though its boundaries were changed in 1970.

In general elections, the district tends to vote close to the national result when looking at the voter split between the two blocs.

== General elections results ==
=== General elections in the 2020s ===
2022 Danish general election

Parties	Vote		
Parties	Votes	%	+ / -
Social Democrats	4,064	32.71	+1.70
Venstre	2,447	19.70	-6.97
Denmark Democrats	862	6.94	New
Green Left	789	6.35	+2.02
Moderates	751	6.05	New
Red–Green Alliance	743	5.98	-2.98
Danish People's Party	739	5.95	-4.63
Liberal Alliance	457	3.68	+2.56
Conservatives	447	3.60	+1.94
The Alternative	377	3.03	-0.60
Christian Democrats	281	2.26	-2.02
New Right	274	2.21	+0.56
Social Liberals	145	1.17	-2.25
Independent Greens	25	0.20	New
Charlotte Petersen	22	0.18	New
Total	12,423		

=== General elections in the 2010s ===
2019 Danish general election

Parties	Vote		
Parties	Votes	%	+ / -
Social Democrats	3,965	31.01	+0.73
Venstre	3,410	26.67	+4.89
Danish People's Party	1,353	10.58	-9.02
Red–Green Alliance	1,146	8.96	-0.08
Green Left	553	4.33	+1.50
Christian Democrats	547	4.28	+1.04
The Alternative	464	3.63	-2.05
Social Liberals	437	3.42	+1.74
Stram Kurs	215	1.68	New
Conservatives	212	1.66	+0.17
New Right	211	1.65	New
Liberal Alliance	143	1.12	-3.27
Klaus Riskær Pedersen Party	130	1.02	New
Total	12,786		

2015 Danish general election

Parties	Vote		
Parties	Votes	%	+ / -
Social Democrats	4,007	30.28	-2.19
Venstre	2,882	21.78	-6.89
Danish People's Party	2,594	19.60	+8.11
Red–Green Alliance	1,196	9.04	+1.20
The Alternative	752	5.68	New
Liberal Alliance	581	4.39	+2.51
Christian Democrats	429	3.24	+0.39
Green Left	374	2.83	-4.58
Social Liberals	223	1.68	-3.79
Conservatives	197	1.49	-0.42
Total	13,235		

2011 Danish general election

Parties	Vote		
Parties	Votes	%	+ / -
Social Democrats	4,550	32.47	+0.84
Venstre	4,018	28.67	-0.25
Danish People's Party	1,611	11.49	-0.65
Red–Green Alliance	1,099	7.84	+5.70
Green Left	1,038	7.41	-4.83
Social Liberals	767	5.47	+3.35
Christian Democrats	400	2.85	+0.75
Conservatives	268	1.91	-4.02
Liberal Alliance	264	1.88	-0.83
Total	14,015		

=== General elections in the 2000s ===
2007 Danish general election

Parties	Vote		
Parties	Votes	%	+ / -
Social Democrats	4,617	31.63	+2.01
Venstre	4,221	28.92	-8.93
Green Left	1,787	12.24	+8.30
Danish People's Party	1,772	12.14	+2.41
Conservatives	866	5.93	+3.24
New Alliance	396	2.71	New
Red–Green Alliance	312	2.14	-2.53
Social Liberals	310	2.12	-2.05
Christian Democrats	306	2.10	-2.05
Mogens Nebelong	9	0.06	New
Total	14,596		

2005 Danish general election

Parties	Vote		
Parties	Votes	%	+ / -
Venstre	5,452	37.85	-0.38
Social Democrats	4,266	29.62	-4.45
Danish People's Party	1,401	9.73	+0.27
Red–Green Alliance	673	4.67	+2.35
Social Liberals	600	4.17	+2.07
Christian Democrats	598	4.15	+0.13
Green Left	567	3.94	-0.74
Conservatives	387	2.69	-0.69
Poul Erik Jessen	268	1.86	New
Centre Democrats	92	0.64	-0.33
Tonny Rajnar Jarl Borrinjaland	60	0.42	New
Minority Party	39	0.27	New
Total	14,403		

2001 Danish general election

Parties	Vote		
Parties	Votes	%	+ / -
Venstre	5,748	38.23	+1.98
Social Democrats	5,122	34.07	-1.85
Danish People's Party	1,423	9.46	+4.04
Green Left	704	4.68	-0.61
Christian People's Party	605	4.02	-1.46
Conservatives	508	3.38	+0.96
Red–Green Alliance	349	2.32	-0.37
Social Liberals	315	2.10	-0.05
Centre Democrats	146	0.97	-1.26
Progress Party	115	0.76	-0.78
Total	15,035		

=== General elections in the 1990s ===
1998 Danish general election

Parties	Vote		
Parties	Votes	%	+ / -
Venstre	5,353	36.25	+6.26
Social Democrats	5,304	35.92	+0.46
Christian People's Party	809	5.48	+0.20
Danish People's Party	800	5.42	New
Green Left	781	5.29	+0.14
Red–Green Alliance	397	2.69	-0.30
Conservatives	358	2.42	-4.46
Centre Democrats	329	2.23	-0.21
Social Liberals	317	2.15	-0.83
Progress Party	228	1.54	-5.31
Democratic Renewal	91	0.62	New
Total	14,767		

1994 Danish general election

Parties	Vote		
Parties	Votes	%	+ / -
Social Democrats	5,166	35.46	-3.24
Venstre	4,369	29.99	+3.82
Conservatives	1,003	6.88	+0.31
Progress Party	998	6.85	+0.89
Christian People's Party	769	5.28	-0.81
Green Left	750	5.15	+0.26
Red–Green Alliance	435	2.99	+1.94
Social Liberals	434	2.98	+1.23
Centre Democrats	355	2.44	-0.14
Sigvard Mossin Kofoed	291	2.00	New
Total	14,570		

1990 Danish general election

Parties	Vote		
Parties	Votes	%	+ / -
Social Democrats	5,736	38.70	+8.45
Venstre	3,878	26.17	+2.90
Conservatives	973	6.57	-3.27
Christian People's Party	903	6.09	+0.15
Progress Party	884	5.96	-5.89
Green Left	725	4.89	-4.03
Centre Democrats	382	2.58	+0.16
Erik Truelsen	372	2.51	New
Common Course	319	2.15	+0.42
Social Liberals	260	1.75	-1.85
Red–Green Alliance	156	1.05	New
The Greens	152	1.03	-0.46
Justice Party of Denmark	81	0.55	New
Total	14,821		

=== General elections in the 1980s ===
1988 Danish general election

Parties	Vote		
Parties	Votes	%	+ / -
Social Democrats	4,656	30.25	+0.01
Venstre	3,581	23.27	+0.42
Progress Party	1,824	11.85	+5.90
Conservatives	1,515	9.84	-2.89
Green Left	1,373	8.92	-0.62
Christian People's Party	914	5.94	-0.17
Social Liberals	554	3.60	-0.38
Centre Democrats	372	2.42	-0.28
Common Course	267	1.73	-0.66
The Greens	229	1.49	-0.05
Communist Party of Denmark	68	0.44	-0.09
Left Socialists	39	0.25	-0.49
Total	15,392		

1987 Danish general election

Parties	Vote		
Parties	Votes	%	+ / -
Social Democrats	4,759	30.24	-0.33
Venstre	3,596	22.85	-5.51
Conservatives	2,004	12.73	-1.44
Green Left	1,501	9.54	+3.29
Christian People's Party	961	6.11	-0.08
Progress Party	937	5.95	+0.60
Social Liberals	626	3.98	+0.24
Centre Democrats	425	2.70	+0.40
Common Course	376	2.39	New
The Greens	242	1.54	New
Left Socialists	117	0.74	-0.68
Communist Party of Denmark	83	0.53	+0.12
Justice Party of Denmark	69	0.44	-0.70
Humanist Party	27	0.17	New
Ulrik Solberg Rasmussen	9	0.06	New
Marxist–Leninists Party	4	0.03	0.00
Socialist Workers Party	2	0.01	-0.05
Total	15,738		

1984 Danish general election

Parties	Vote		
Parties	Votes	%	+ / -
Social Democrats	4,944	30.57	+0.60
Venstre	4,586	28.36	+3.16
Conservatives	2,291	14.17	+8.12
Green Left	1,011	6.25	+0.18
Christian People's Party	1,001	6.19	+0.07
Progress Party	865	5.35	-9.64
Social Liberals	605	3.74	+0.16
Centre Democrats	372	2.30	-2.65
Left Socialists	230	1.42	+0.18
Justice Party of Denmark	185	1.14	+0.13
Communist Party of Denmark	67	0.41	-0.11
Socialist Workers Party	10	0.06	+0.03
Marxist–Leninists Party	5	0.03	New
Total	16,172		

1981 Danish general election

Parties	Vote		
Parties	Votes	%	+ / -
Social Democrats	4,634	29.97	-1.64
Venstre	3,896	25.20	+1.24
Progress Party	2,317	14.99	-1.54
Christian People's Party	946	6.12	-0.70
Green Left	939	6.07	+2.80
Conservatives	935	6.05	-0.67
Centre Democrats	766	4.95	+3.18
Social Liberals	553	3.58	-0.21
Left Socialists	192	1.24	-0.75
Justice Party of Denmark	156	1.01	-0.92
Communist Party of Denmark	81	0.52	-0.62
Anders Højmark Andersen	22	0.14	New
Communist Workers Party	18	0.12	-0.34
Socialist Workers Party	5	0.03	New
Total	15,460		

=== General elections in the 1970s ===
1979 Danish general election

Parties	Vote		
Parties	Votes	%	+ / -
Social Democrats	4,867	31.61	+2.21
Venstre	3,689	23.96	-4.11
Progress Party	2,545	16.53	-1.88
Christian People's Party	1,050	6.82	-0.19
Conservatives	1,035	6.72	+2.98
Social Liberals	584	3.79	+1.60
Green Left	503	3.27	+1.30
Left Socialists	306	1.99	+0.34
Justice Party of Denmark	297	1.93	-0.32
Centre Democrats	272	1.77	-1.18
Communist Party of Denmark	176	1.14	-0.47
Communist Workers Party	71	0.46	New
Total	15,395		

1977 Danish general election

Parties	Vote		
Parties	Votes	%	+ / -
Social Democrats	4,409	29.40	+3.10
Venstre	4,210	28.07	-2.75
Progress Party	2,761	18.41	+0.13
Christian People's Party	1,051	7.01	-2.78
Conservatives	561	3.74	+0.91
Centre Democrats	442	2.95	+1.81
Justice Party of Denmark	337	2.25	+1.04
Social Liberals	329	2.19	-2.00
Green Left	295	1.97	-0.20
Left Socialists	247	1.65	+0.40
Communist Party of Denmark	242	1.61	-0.41
Pensioners' Party	113	0.75	New
Total	14,997		

1975 Danish general election

Parties	Vote		
Parties	Votes	%	+ / -
Venstre	4,523	30.82	+10.10
Social Democrats	3,860	26.30	+3.22
Progress Party	2,682	18.28	-3.20
Christian People's Party	1,436	9.79	+0.28
Social Liberals	615	4.19	-3.46
Conservatives	415	2.83	-2.06
Green Left	318	2.17	-0.69
Communist Party of Denmark	297	2.02	+0.35
Left Socialists	184	1.25	+0.40
Justice Party of Denmark	177	1.21	-0.94
Centre Democrats	168	1.14	-4.01
Total	14,675		

1973 Danish general election

Parties	Vote		
Parties	Votes	%	+ / -
Social Democrats	3,351	23.08	-13.76
Progress Party	3,119	21.48	New
Venstre	3,008	20.72	-4.61
Christian People's Party	1,381	9.51	+2.83
Social Liberals	1,111	7.65	-3.86
Centre Democrats	748	5.15	New
Conservatives	710	4.89	-6.41
Green Left	415	2.86	-2.12
Justice Party of Denmark	312	2.15	+0.32
Communist Party of Denmark	242	1.67	+1.06
Left Socialists	123	0.85	-0.08
Total	14,520		

1971 Danish general election

Parties	Vote		
Parties	Votes	%	+ / -
Social Democrats	5,087	36.84	+5.29
Venstre	3,498	25.33	-8.70
Social Liberals	1,589	11.51	-1.60
Conservatives	1,560	11.30	-3.36
Christian People's Party	923	6.68	New
Green Left	687	4.98	+2.14
Justice Party of Denmark	253	1.83	+0.74
Left Socialists	128	0.93	-0.06
Communist Party of Denmark	84	0.61	+0.20
Total	13,809		

=== General elections in the 1960s ===
1968 Danish general election

Parties	Vote		
Parties	Votes	%	+ / -
Venstre	3,631	34.03	-0.30
Social Democrats	3,367	31.55	-5.86
Conservatives	1,564	14.66	+1.29
Social Liberals	1,399	13.11	+6.23
Green Left	303	2.84	-0.80
Justice Party of Denmark	116	1.09	-0.29
Left Socialists	106	0.99	New
Liberal Centre	90	0.84	-0.52
Independent Party	51	0.48	-0.79
Communist Party of Denmark	44	0.41	+0.05
Total	10,671		

1966 Danish general election

Parties	Vote		
Parties	Votes	%	+ / -
Social Democrats	4,000	37.41	-1.80
Venstre	3,670	34.33	-3.67
Conservatives	1,429	13.37	+0.80
Social Liberals	736	6.88	+1.92
Green Left	389	3.64	+2.10
Justice Party of Denmark	148	1.38	-0.40
Liberal Centre	145	1.36	New
Independent Party	136	1.27	+0.19
Communist Party of Denmark	38	0.36	-0.14
Total	10,691		

1964 Danish general election

Parties	Vote		
Parties	Votes	%	+ / -
Social Democrats	3,936	39.21	+0.25
Venstre	3,814	38.00	-1.72
Conservatives	1,262	12.57	+2.63
Social Liberals	498	4.96	-0.88
Justice Party of Denmark	179	1.78	-1.08
Green Left	155	1.54	+0.33
Independent Party	108	1.08	+0.09
Communist Party of Denmark	50	0.50	+0.02
Danish Unity	35	0.35	New
Total	10,037		

1960 Danish general election

Parties	Vote		
Parties	Votes	%	+ / -
Venstre	3,839	39.72	-1.13
Social Democrats	3,765	38.96	+2.00
Conservatives	961	9.94	+0.83
Social Liberals	564	5.84	-0.16
Justice Party of Denmark	276	2.86	-1.62
Green Left	117	1.21	New
Independent Party	96	0.99	-0.91
Communist Party of Denmark	46	0.48	-0.23
Total	9,664		

=== General elections in the 1950s ===
1957 Danish general election

Parties	Vote		
Parties	Votes	%	+ / -
Venstre	4,105	40.85	+0.51
Social Democrats	3,714	36.96	-2.53
Conservatives	915	9.11	+0.24
Social Liberals	603	6.00	-0.28
Justice Party of Denmark	450	4.48	+0.56
Independent Party	191	1.90	New
Communist Party of Denmark	71	0.71	-0.38
Total	10,049		

September 1953 Danish Folketing election

Parties	Vote		
Parties	Votes	%	+ / -
Venstre	3,896	40.34	+2.17
Social Democrats	3,814	39.49	-0.37
Conservatives	857	8.87	-0.82
Social Liberals	607	6.28	+0.11
Justice Party of Denmark	379	3.92	-1.21
Communist Party of Denmark	105	1.09	+0.11
Total	9,658		

April 1953 Danish Folketing election

Parties	Vote		
Parties	Votes	%	+ / -
Social Democrats	3,628	39.86	+2.36
Venstre	3,474	38.17	+2.15
Conservatives	882	9.69	-0.50
Social Liberals	562	6.17	-0.98
Justice Party of Denmark	467	5.13	-2.96
Communist Party of Denmark	89	0.98	-0.07
Total	9,102		

1950 Danish Folketing election

Parties	Vote		
Parties	Votes	%	+ / -
Social Democrats	3,458	37.50	+0.37
Venstre	3,322	36.02	-6.95
Conservatives	940	10.19	+3.07
Justice Party of Denmark	746	8.09	+4.51
Social Liberals	659	7.15	+1.02
Communist Party of Denmark	97	1.05	-0.50
Total	9,222		

=== General elections in the 1940s ===
1947 Danish Folketing election

Parties	Vote		
Parties	Votes	%	+ / -
Venstre	4,208	42.97	+0.69
Social Democrats	3,636	37.13	+4.25
Conservatives	697	7.12	-1.60
Social Liberals	600	6.13	-1.25
Justice Party of Denmark	351	3.58	+1.14
Communist Party of Denmark	152	1.55	-0.91
Danish Unity	149	1.52	-2.32
Total	9,793		

1945 Danish Folketing election

Parties	Vote		
Parties	Votes	%	+ / -
Venstre	4,035	42.28	+4.67
Social Democrats	3,138	32.88	-5.40
Conservatives	832	8.72	-1.38
Social Liberals	704	7.38	+0.79
Danish Unity	366	3.84	+2.33
Communist Party of Denmark	235	2.46	New
Justice Party of Denmark	233	2.44	-0.07
Total	9,543		

1943 Danish Folketing election

Parties	Vote		
Parties	Votes	%	+ / -
Social Democrats	3,801	38.28	+4.90
Venstre	3,735	37.61	-2.95
Conservatives	1,003	10.10	+0.67
Social Liberals	654	6.59	-0.69
Farmers' Party	267	2.69	-1.45
Justice Party of Denmark	249	2.51	-0.37
Danish Unity	150	1.51	New
National Socialist Workers' Party of Denmark	71	0.72	-0.81
Total	9,930		

=== General elections in the 1930s ===
1939 Danish Folketing election

Parties	Vote		
Parties	Votes	%	+ / -
Venstre	3,508	40.56	+4.92
Social Democrats	2,887	33.38	-2.88
Conservatives	816	9.43	-1.59
Social Liberals	630	7.28	-0.44
Farmers' Party	358	4.14	+0.67
Justice Party of Denmark	249	2.88	-2.37
National Socialist Workers' Party of Denmark	132	1.53	+0.88
Communist Party of Denmark	69	0.80	New
Total	8,649		

1935 Danish Folketing election

Parties	Vote		
Parties	Votes	%	+ / -
Social Democrats	3,076	36.26	+4.46
Venstre	3,023	35.64	-6.78
Conservatives	935	11.02	-1.52
Social Liberals	655	7.72	-0.38
Justice Party of Denmark	445	5.25	+0.87
Independent People's Party	294	3.47	New
National Socialist Workers' Party of Denmark	55	0.65	New
Total	8,483		

1932 Danish Folketing election

Parties	Vote		
Parties	Votes	%	+ / -
Venstre	3,512	42.42	-1.13
Social Democrats	2,633	31.80	-2.11
Conservatives	1,038	12.54	+2.48
Social Liberals	671	8.10	-1.50
Justice Party of Denmark	363	4.38	+1.50
Communist Party of Denmark	62	0.75	New
Total	8,279		

=== General elections in the 1920s ===
1929 Danish Folketing election

Parties	Vote		
Parties	Votes	%	+ / -
Venstre	3,446	43.55	-3.44
Social Democrats	2,683	33.91	+4.31
Conservatives	796	10.06	-1.31
Social Liberals	760	9.60	+1.05
Justice Party of Denmark	228	2.88	-0.47
Total	7,913		

1926 Danish Folketing election

Parties	Vote		
Parties	Votes	%	+ / -
Venstre	3,418	46.99	-2.43
Social Democrats	2,153	29.60	+2.60
Conservatives	827	11.37	+0.03
Social Liberals	622	8.55	-3.63
Justice Party of Denmark	244	3.35	New
Communist Party of Denmark	10	0.14	+0.08
Total	7,274		

1924 Danish Folketing election

Parties	Vote		
Parties	Votes	%	+ / -
Venstre	3,542	49.42	-2.40
Social Democrats	1,935	27.00	+4.01
Social Liberals	873	12.18	-0.29
Conservatives	813	11.34	-0.63
Communist Party of Denmark	4	0.06	New
Total	7,167		

September 1920 Danish Folketing election

Parties	Vote		
Parties	Votes	%	+ / -
Venstre	3,661	51.82	-1.71
Social Democrats	1,624	22.99	+3.75
Social Liberals	881	12.47	+0.50
Conservatives	846	11.97	-2.34
Industry Party	53	0.75	-0.19
Total	7,065		

July 1920 Danish Folketing election

Parties	Vote		
Parties	Votes	%	+ / -
Venstre	3,060	53.53	+0.26
Social Democrats	1,100	19.24	+2.40
Conservatives	818	14.31	+0.77
Social Liberals	684	11.97	-2.98
Industry Party	54	0.94	-0.45
Total	5,716		

April 1920 Danish Folketing election

Parties	Vote	
Parties	Votes	%
Venstre	3,327	53.27
Social Democrats	1,052	16.84
Social Liberals	934	14.95
Conservatives	846	13.54
Industry Party	87	1.39
Total	6,246	

== European Parliament elections results ==
2024 European Parliament election in Denmark

Parties	Vote		
Parties	Votes	%	+ / -
Venstre	1,611	19.35	-0.80
Social Democrats	1,451	17.43	-18.36
Green Left	1,288	15.47	+8.28
Red–Green Alliance	699	8.39	+2.44
Denmark Democrats	687	8.25	New
Conservatives	655	7.87	+4.70
Danish People's Party	624	7.49	-6.62
Moderates	396	4.76	New
Liberal Alliance	362	4.35	+3.08
Social Liberals	351	4.22	-0.28
The Alternative	203	2.44	-1.11
Total	8,327		

2019 European Parliament election in Denmark

Parties	Vote		
Parties	Votes	%	+ / -
Social Democrats	3,605	35.79	+2.55
Venstre	2,030	20.15	+4.27
Danish People's Party	1,421	14.11	-9.79
Green Left	724	7.19	+0.19
Red–Green Alliance	599	5.95	New
Social Liberals	453	4.50	+1.88
People's Movement against the EU	436	4.33	-6.25
The Alternative	358	3.55	New
Conservatives	319	3.17	-2.37
Liberal Alliance	128	1.27	+0.03
Total	10,073		

2014 European Parliament election in Denmark

Parties	Vote		
Parties	Votes	%	+ / -
Social Democrats	2,779	33.24	+10.76
Danish People's Party	1,998	23.90	+9.83
Venstre	1,328	15.88	-7.99
People's Movement against the EU	885	10.58	+1.90
Green Left	585	7.00	-7.48
Conservatives	463	5.54	-4.17
Social Liberals	219	2.62	-0.21
Liberal Alliance	104	1.24	+0.94
Total	8,361		

2009 European Parliament election in Denmark

Parties	Vote		
Parties	Votes	%	+ / -
Venstre	2,158	23.87	-0.30
Social Democrats	2,032	22.48	-12.74
Green Left	1,309	14.48	+9.78
Danish People's Party	1,272	14.07	+7.69
Conservatives	878	9.71	+4.47
People's Movement against the EU	785	8.68	+3.02
June Movement	323	3.57	-6.11
Social Liberals	256	2.83	-1.05
Liberal Alliance	27	0.30	New
Total	9,040		

2004 European Parliament election in Denmark

Parties	Vote		
Parties	Votes	%	+ / -
Social Democrats	2,992	35.22	+14.28
Venstre	2,053	24.17	-6.66
June Movement	822	9.68	-6.49
Danish People's Party	542	6.38	+1.62
People's Movement against the EU	481	5.66	-0.53
Conservatives	445	5.24	+0.94
Christian Democrats	431	5.07	-0.26
Green Left	399	4.70	-0.08
Social Liberals	330	3.88	-0.63
Total	8,495		

1999 European Parliament election in Denmark

Parties	Vote		
Parties	Votes	%	+ / -
Venstre	2,637	30.83	+0.31
Social Democrats	1,791	20.94	+4.87
June Movement	1,383	16.17	+0.64
People's Movement against the EU	529	6.19	-2.96
Christian Democrats	456	5.33	+0.60
Green Left	409	4.78	+0.26
Danish People's Party	407	4.76	New
Social Liberals	386	4.51	-1.07
Conservatives	368	4.30	-5.38
Centre Democrats	186	2.17	+1.57
Progress Party	53	0.62	-2.99
Total	8,552		

1994 European Parliament election in Denmark

Parties	Vote		
Parties	Votes	%	+ / -
Venstre	2,909	30.52	-9.01
Social Democrats	1,532	16.07	-2.70
June Movement	1,480	15.53	New
Conservatives	923	9.68	+4.60
People's Movement against the EU	872	9.15	-8.68
Social Liberals	532	5.58	+4.21
Christian Democrats	451	4.73	-0.53
Green Left	431	4.52	-0.26
Progress Party	344	3.61	-1.29
Centre Democrats	57	0.60	-1.87
Total	9,531		

1989 European Parliament election in Denmark

Parties	Vote		
Parties	Votes	%	+ / -
Venstre	3,828	39.53	+17.53
Social Democrats	1,818	18.77	+0.63
People's Movement against the EU	1,727	17.83	-0.78
Christian Democrats	509	5.26	-2.10
Conservatives	492	5.08	-9.26
Progress Party	475	4.90	-1.49
Green Left	463	4.78	+0.33
Centre Democrats	239	2.47	-3.07
Social Liberals	133	1.37	-1.27
Total	9,684		

1984 European Parliament election in Denmark

Parties	Vote	
Parties	Votes	%
Venstre	2,087	22.00
People's Movement against the EU	1,766	18.61
Social Democrats	1,721	18.14
Conservatives	1,360	14.34
Christian Democrats	698	7.36
Progress Party	606	6.39
Centre Democrats	526	5.54
Green Left	422	4.45
Social Liberals	250	2.64
Left Socialists	51	0.54
Total	9,487	

== Referendums ==
2022 Danish European Union opt-out referendum

Option	Votes	%
✓ YES	6,437	62.56
X NO	3,853	37.44

2015 Danish European Union opt-out referendum

Option	Votes	%
X NO	6,150	55.15
✓ YES	5,002	44.85

2014 Danish Unified Patent Court membership referendum

Option	Votes	%
✓ YES	5,007	61.81
X NO	3,093	38.19

2009 Danish Act of Succession referendum

Option	Votes	%
✓ YES	7,033	82.93
X NO	1,448	17.07

2000 Danish euro referendum

Option	Votes	%
X NO	8,848	60.01
✓ YES	5,895	39.99

1998 Danish Amsterdam Treaty referendum

Option	Votes	%
✓ YES	6,707	52.65
X NO	6,032	47.35

1993 Danish Maastricht Treaty referendum

Option	Votes	%
✓ YES	7,590	51.88
X NO	7,040	48.12

1992 Danish Maastricht Treaty referendum

Option	Votes	%
X NO	7,170	50.87
✓ YES	6,925	49.13

1986 Danish Single European Act referendum

Option	Votes	%
✓ YES	8,145	61.95
X NO	5,003	38.05

1972 Danish European Communities membership referendum

Option	Votes	%
✓ YES	9,250	64.78
X NO	5,030	35.22

1953 Danish constitutional and electoral age referendum

Option	Votes	%
✓ YES	6,362	91.65
X NO	580	8.35
23 years	4,173	58.92
21 years	2,910	41.08

1939 Danish constitutional referendum

Option	Votes	%
✓ YES	3,347	92.36
X NO	277	7.64
