= Viborg West (nomination district) =

- Viborg Vest
- Nomination district constituency for the Folketing
- Location of Viborg West within West Jutland

- Location of West Jutland within Denmark
- Municipalities: Viborg
- Constituency: West Jutland
- Electorate: 32,889 (2022)

Current constituency
- Created: 2007

Viborg West nominating district is one of the 92 nominating districts that was created for Danish elections following the 2007 municipal reform It is one of the two nominating districts in Viborg Municipality, the other being Viborg East.

In general elections, parties commonly associated with the blue bloc have always obtained most votes in the district.

== General elections results ==
=== General elections in the 2020s ===
2022 Danish general election

Parties	Vote		
Parties	Votes	%	+ / -
Social Democrats	8,488	27.09	+0.94
Conservatives	4,811	15.36	-0.78
Venstre	4,249	13.56	-9.59
Denmark Democrats	3,426	10.94	New
Green Left	2,633	8.40	-0.26
Liberal Alliance	2,061	6.58	+4.66
Moderates	1,829	5.84	New
New Right	926	2.96	+1.55
Red–Green Alliance	907	2.90	-1.12
The Alternative	638	2.04	-0.13
Social Liberals	584	1.86	-3.48
Danish People's Party	546	1.74	-5.32
Christian Democrats	158	0.50	-1.32
Independent Greens	44	0.14	New
Karen Predbjørn Klarbæk	27	0.09	New
Total	31,327		

=== General elections in the 2010s ===
2019 Danish general election

Parties	Vote		
Parties	Votes	%	+ / -
Social Democrats	8,256	26.15	-0.17
Venstre	7,308	23.15	+0.48
Conservatives	5,096	16.14	+7.57
Green Left	2,733	8.66	+3.72
Danish People's Party	2,229	7.06	-12.09
Social Liberals	1,685	5.34	+2.28
Red–Green Alliance	1,268	4.02	-1.32
The Alternative	684	2.17	-1.08
Liberal Alliance	605	1.92	-3.93
Christian Democrats	574	1.82	+0.99
Stram Kurs	503	1.59	New
New Right	445	1.41	New
Klaus Riskær Pedersen Party	186	0.59	New
Total	31,572		

2015 Danish general election

Parties	Vote		
Parties	Votes	%	+ / -
Social Democrats	8,368	26.32	+0.82
Venstre	7,207	22.67	-9.76
Danish People's Party	6,089	19.15	+7.82
Conservatives	2,726	8.57	+5.16
Liberal Alliance	1,859	5.85	+1.48
Red–Green Alliance	1,698	5.34	+1.23
Green Left	1,572	4.94	-4.81
The Alternative	1,032	3.25	New
Social Liberals	974	3.06	-5.07
Christian Democrats	263	0.83	-0.01
Erik Sputnik	5	0.02	New
Total	31,793		

2011 Danish general election

Parties	Vote		
Parties	Votes	%	+ / -
Venstre	10,307	32.43	-2.22
Social Democrats	8,103	25.50	-1.51
Danish People's Party	3,601	11.33	-1.17
Green Left	3,097	9.75	-0.57
Social Liberals	2,584	8.13	+3.90
Liberal Alliance	1,388	4.37	+2.26
Red–Green Alliance	1,307	4.11	+3.18
Conservatives	1,085	3.41	-3.72
Christian Democrats	268	0.84	-0.27
Rikke Cramer Christiansen	37	0.12	New
Ejgil Kølbæk	2	0.01	-0.01
Total	31,779		

=== General elections in the 2000s ===
2007 Danish general election

Parties	Vote		
Parties	Votes	%	+ / -
Venstre	10,682	34.65	
Social Democrats	8,326	27.01	
Danish People's Party	3,853	12.50	
Green Left	3,183	10.32	
Conservatives	2,197	7.13	
Social Liberals	1,305	4.23	
New Alliance	651	2.11	
Christian Democrats	341	1.11	
Red–Green Alliance	287	0.93	
Ejgil Kølbæk	6	0.02	
Total	30,831		

== European Parliament elections results ==
2024 European Parliament election in Denmark

Parties	Vote		
Parties	Votes	%	+ / -
Venstre	3,676	17.40	-9.78
Social Democrats	3,474	16.44	-6.39
Green Left	3,164	14.98	+3.37
Denmark Democrats	2,513	11.90	New
Conservatives	2,187	10.35	+1.48
Liberal Alliance	1,457	6.9	+5.17
Danish People's Party	1,414	6.69	-3.98
Social Liberals	1,034	4.89	-2.94
Moderates	932	4.41	New
Red–Green Alliance	779	3.69	+0.13
The Alternative	495	2.34	-0.24
Total	21,125		

2019 European Parliament election in Denmark

Parties	Vote		
Parties	Votes	%	+ / -
Venstre	6,437	27.18	+2.16
Social Democrats	5,406	22.83	+3.56
Green Left	2,750	11.61	+2.31
Danish People's Party	2,526	10.67	-15.04
Conservatives	2,101	8.87	+1.52
Social Liberals	1,854	7.83	+3.04
Red–Green Alliance	843	3.56	New
People's Movement against the EU	745	3.15	-3.15
The Alternative	612	2.58	New
Liberal Alliance	410	1.73	-0.52
Total	23,684		

2014 European Parliament election in Denmark

Parties	Vote		
Parties	Votes	%	+ / -
Danish People's Party	5,053	25.71	+13.16
Venstre	4,918	25.02	-4.93
Social Democrats	3,787	19.27	-2.25
Green Left	1,828	9.30	-4.40
Conservatives	1,444	7.35	-3.27
People's Movement against the EU	1,238	6.30	-0.01
Social Liberals	942	4.79	+1.52
Liberal Alliance	443	2.25	+1.81
Total	19,653		

2009 European Parliament election in Denmark

Parties	Vote		
Parties	Votes	%	+ / -
Venstre	6,139	29.95	
Social Democrats	4,412	21.52	
Green Left	2,809	13.70	
Danish People's Party	2,573	12.55	
Conservatives	2,178	10.62	
People's Movement against the EU	1,294	6.31	
Social Liberals	670	3.27	
June Movement	333	1.62	
Liberal Alliance	91	0.44	
Total	20,499		

== Referendums ==
2022 Danish European Union opt-out referendum

Option	Votes	%
✓ YES	16,218	66.82
X NO	8,052	33.18

2015 Danish European Union opt-out referendum

Option	Votes	%
X NO	12,913	50.55
✓ YES	12,634	49.45

2014 Danish Unified Patent Court membership referendum

Option	Votes	%
✓ YES	12,607	65.76
X NO	6,564	34.24

2009 Danish Act of Succession referendum

Option	Votes	%
✓ YES	16,971	86.58
X NO	2,630	13.42
