= Rønne (nomination district) =

- Rønne
- Nomination district constituency for the Folketing
- Location of Rønne within Bornholm

- Location of Bornholm within Denmark
- Municipalities: Bornholm
- Constituency: Bornholm
- Electorate: 15,477 (2022)

Current constituency
- Created: 1849 (as constituency); 1920 (as nomination district)

Rønne nominating district is one of the 92 nominating districts that was created for Danish elections following the 2007 municipal reform. It is one of the 2 nominating districts in Bornholm Municipality, the other being Aakirkeby. It was created in 1849 as a constituency, and has been a nomination district since 1920, though its boundaries were changed in 1970.

In general elections, the district tends to vote a bit more for parties commonly associated with the red bloc.

== General elections results ==
=== General elections in the 2020s ===
2022 Danish general election

Parties	Vote		
Parties	Votes	%	+ / -
Social Democrats	4,657	37.87	+0.84
Venstre	2,188	17.79	-6.01
Danish People's Party	811	6.59	-3.60
Green Left	801	6.51	+2.20
Moderates	748	6.08	New
Denmark Democrats	728	5.92	New
Red–Green Alliance	536	4.36	-2.89
Conservatives	479	3.89	+1.94
Liberal Alliance	435	3.54	+2.70
The Alternative	286	2.33	-0.55
New Right	255	2.07	+0.33
Christian Democrats	222	1.81	-2.08
Social Liberals	106	0.86	-2.41
Independent Greens	23	0.19	New
Charlotte Petersen	23	0.19	New
Total	12,298		

=== General elections in the 2010s ===
2019 Danish general election

Parties	Vote		
Parties	Votes	%	+ / -
Social Democrats	4,628	37.03	+0.26
Venstre	2,974	23.80	+5.12
Danish People's Party	1,273	10.19	-10.05
Red–Green Alliance	906	7.25	-0.45
Green Left	538	4.31	+1.62
Christian Democrats	486	3.89	+1.37
Social Liberals	409	3.27	+1.67
The Alternative	360	2.88	-1.42
Stram Kurs	266	2.13	New
Conservatives	244	1.95	+0.03
New Right	217	1.74	New
Liberal Alliance	105	0.84	-2.75
Klaus Riskær Pedersen Party	91	0.73	New
Total	12,497		

2015 Danish general election

Parties	Vote		
Parties	Votes	%	+ / -
Social Democrats	4,676	36.77	-2.57
Danish People's Party	2,574	20.24	+10.04
Venstre	2,375	18.68	-5.97
Red–Green Alliance	979	7.70	+1.01
The Alternative	547	4.30	New
Liberal Alliance	456	3.59	+1.75
Green Left	342	2.69	-4.60
Christian Democrats	320	2.52	+0.41
Conservatives	244	1.92	-0.42
Social Liberals	204	1.60	-3.96
Total	12,717		

2011 Danish general election

Parties	Vote		
Parties	Votes	%	+ / -
Social Democrats	5,251	39.34	-0.08
Venstre	3,291	24.65	+1.25
Danish People's Party	1,361	10.20	-1.68
Green Left	973	7.29	-4.23
Red–Green Alliance	893	6.69	+4.98
Social Liberals	742	5.56	+3.26
Conservatives	312	2.34	-3.81
Christian Democrats	281	2.11	+0.25
Liberal Alliance	245	1.84	+0.19
Total	13,349		

=== General elections in the 2000s ===
2007 Danish general election

Parties	Vote		
Parties	Votes	%	+ / -
Social Democrats	5,271	39.42	+2.57
Venstre	3,129	23.40	-8.14
Danish People's Party	1,589	11.88	+1.85
Green Left	1,541	11.52	+7.39
Conservatives	822	6.15	+3.04
Social Liberals	308	2.30	-1.82
Christian Democrats	249	1.86	-1.92
Red–Green Alliance	229	1.71	-2.36
New Alliance	221	1.65	New
Mogens Nebelong	12	0.09	New
Total	13,371		

2005 Danish general election

Parties	Vote		
Parties	Votes	%	+ / -
Social Democrats	4,850	36.85	-5.67
Venstre	4,152	31.54	+0.88
Danish People's Party	1,320	10.03	+0.18
Green Left	544	4.13	-0.19
Social Liberals	542	4.12	+2.33
Red–Green Alliance	536	4.07	+2.25
Christian Democrats	498	3.78	+0.08
Conservatives	410	3.11	-0.51
Poul Erik Jessen	170	1.29	New
Centre Democrats	88	0.67	-0.42
Tonny Rajnar Jarl Borrinjaland	28	0.21	New
Minority Party	25	0.19	New
Total	13,163		

2001 Danish general election

Parties	Vote		
Parties	Votes	%	+ / -
Social Democrats	5,807	42.52	-1.73
Venstre	4,187	30.66	+1.95
Danish People's Party	1,345	9.85	+4.52
Green Left	590	4.32	-1.47
Christian People's Party	505	3.70	-0.65
Conservatives	495	3.62	+0.28
Red–Green Alliance	249	1.82	-0.17
Social Liberals	245	1.79	-0.25
Centre Democrats	149	1.09	-1.46
Progress Party	85	0.62	-0.68
Total	13,657		

=== General elections in the 1990s ===
1998 Danish general election

Parties	Vote		
Parties	Votes	%	+ / -
Social Democrats	6,169	44.25	+0.68
Venstre	4,002	28.71	+5.64
Green Left	807	5.79	+0.59
Danish People's Party	743	5.33	New
Christian People's Party	607	4.35	+0.03
Conservatives	466	3.34	-5.31
Centre Democrats	355	2.55	-1.13
Social Liberals	285	2.04	-0.77
Red–Green Alliance	278	1.99	-0.50
Progress Party	181	1.30	-3.94
Democratic Renewal	47	0.34	New
Total	13,940		

1994 Danish general election

Parties	Vote		
Parties	Votes	%	+ / -
Social Democrats	5,984	43.57	-5.67
Venstre	3,168	23.07	+4.49
Conservatives	1,188	8.65	+0.92
Progress Party	720	5.24	+1.04
Green Left	714	5.20	+0.48
Christian People's Party	593	4.32	-0.79
Centre Democrats	505	3.68	-0.09
Social Liberals	386	2.81	+1.52
Red–Green Alliance	342	2.49	+1.76
Sigvard Mossin Kofoed	134	0.98	New
Total	13,734		

1990 Danish general election

Parties	Vote		
Parties	Votes	%	+ / -
Social Democrats	6,785	49.24	+9.98
Venstre	2,561	18.58	+2.50
Conservatives	1,065	7.73	-4.07
Christian People's Party	704	5.11	+0.76
Green Left	651	4.72	-5.42
Progress Party	579	4.20	-4.84
Centre Democrats	519	3.77	+0.48
Erik Truelsen	255	1.85	New
Common Course	240	1.74	+0.22
Social Liberals	178	1.29	-1.55
The Greens	101	0.73	-0.21
Red–Green Alliance	101	0.73	New
Justice Party of Denmark	41	0.30	New
Total	13,780		

=== General elections in the 1980s ===
1988 Danish general election

Parties	Vote		
Parties	Votes	%	+ / -
Social Democrats	5,617	39.26	+0.35
Venstre	2,300	16.08	+1.58
Conservatives	1,688	11.80	-1.91
Green Left	1,451	10.14	-1.89
Progress Party	1,293	9.04	+4.34
Christian People's Party	623	4.35	-0.21
Centre Democrats	470	3.29	-0.09
Social Liberals	406	2.84	-0.71
Common Course	217	1.52	-0.47
The Greens	135	0.94	+0.02
Communist Party of Denmark	78	0.55	-0.07
Left Socialists	29	0.20	-0.28
Total	14,307		

1987 Danish general election

Parties	Vote		
Parties	Votes	%	+ / -
Social Democrats	5,684	38.91	-0.95
Venstre	2,118	14.50	-5.12
Conservatives	2,003	13.71	-0.50
Green Left	1,758	12.03	+3.24
Progress Party	687	4.70	+0.01
Christian People's Party	666	4.56	-0.06
Social Liberals	518	3.55	+0.69
Centre Democrats	494	3.38	+0.72
Common Course	290	1.99	New
The Greens	134	0.92	New
Communist Party of Denmark	90	0.62	-0.04
Left Socialists	70	0.48	-0.51
Justice Party of Denmark	45	0.31	-0.63
Humanist Party	28	0.19	New
Ulrik Solberg Rasmussen	16	0.11	New
Socialist Workers Party	6	0.04	+0.01
Marxist–Leninists Party	1	0.01	-0.04
Total	14,608		

1984 Danish general election

Parties	Vote		
Parties	Votes	%	+ / -
Social Democrats	5,906	39.86	-0.76
Venstre	2,907	19.62	+3.87
Conservatives	2,105	14.21	+7.19
Green Left	1,303	8.79	+0.34
Progress Party	695	4.69	-7.15
Christian People's Party	685	4.62	+0.21
Social Liberals	423	2.86	-0.04
Centre Democrats	394	2.66	-3.65
Left Socialists	147	0.99	+0.20
Justice Party of Denmark	140	0.94	+0.07
Communist Party of Denmark	98	0.66	-0.16
Marxist–Leninists Party	8	0.05	New
Socialist Workers Party	5	0.03	-0.01
Total	14,816		

1981 Danish general election

Parties	Vote		
Parties	Votes	%	+ / -
Social Democrats	5,755	40.62	-3.10
Venstre	2,231	15.75	+0.15
Progress Party	1,677	11.84	-2.06
Green Left	1,197	8.45	+4.27
Conservatives	994	7.02	-0.79
Centre Democrats	894	6.31	+4.22
Christian People's Party	625	4.41	-0.28
Social Liberals	411	2.90	-0.07
Justice Party of Denmark	123	0.87	-0.79
Communist Party of Denmark	116	0.82	-0.75
Left Socialists	112	0.79	-0.64
Anders Højmark Andersen	16	0.11	New
Communist Workers Party	13	0.09	-0.30
Socialist Workers Party	5	0.04	New
Total	14,169		

=== General elections in the 1970s ===
1979 Danish general election

Parties	Vote		
Parties	Votes	%	+ / -
Social Democrats	6,230	43.72	+2.79
Venstre	2,223	15.60	-2.78
Progress Party	1,980	13.90	-3.04
Conservatives	1,113	7.81	+3.10
Christian People's Party	668	4.69	-0.02
Green Left	595	4.18	+1.47
Social Liberals	423	2.97	+1.68
Centre Democrats	298	2.09	-1.68
Justice Party of Denmark	237	1.66	-0.62
Communist Party of Denmark	223	1.57	-0.66
Left Socialists	204	1.43	+0.32
Communist Workers Party	55	0.39	New
Total	14,249		

1977 Danish general election

Parties	Vote		
Parties	Votes	%	+ / -
Social Democrats	5,661	40.93	+4.32
Venstre	2,542	18.38	-4.10
Progress Party	2,343	16.94	-1.17
Conservatives	651	4.71	+1.23
Christian People's Party	651	4.71	-2.07
Centre Democrats	522	3.77	+2.27
Green Left	375	2.71	-0.28
Justice Party of Denmark	316	2.28	+1.15
Communist Party of Denmark	308	2.23	-0.45
Social Liberals	179	1.29	-1.95
Left Socialists	154	1.11	+0.11
Pensioners' Party	129	0.93	New
Total	13,831		

1975 Danish general election

Parties	Vote		
Parties	Votes	%	+ / -
Social Democrats	4,937	36.61	+3.31
Venstre	3,032	22.48	+9.66
Progress Party	2,442	18.11	-1.93
Christian People's Party	915	6.78	+0.52
Conservatives	470	3.48	-2.33
Social Liberals	437	3.24	-3.20
Green Left	403	2.99	-0.96
Communist Party of Denmark	362	2.68	+0.68
Centre Democrats	202	1.50	-4.98
Justice Party of Denmark	152	1.13	-0.98
Left Socialists	135	1.00	+0.21
Total	13,487		

1973 Danish general election

Parties	Vote		
Parties	Votes	%	+ / -
Social Democrats	4,482	33.30	-15.83
Progress Party	2,697	20.04	New
Venstre	1,725	12.82	-2.03
Centre Democrats	872	6.48	New
Social Liberals	867	6.44	-3.29
Christian People's Party	842	6.26	+2.54
Conservatives	782	5.81	-6.87
Green Left	532	3.95	-2.53
Justice Party of Denmark	284	2.11	+0.43
Communist Party of Denmark	269	2.00	+1.29
Left Socialists	106	0.79	-0.22
Total	13,458		

1971 Danish general election

Parties	Vote		
Parties	Votes	%	+ / -
Social Democrats	6,268	49.13	+5.11
Venstre	1,895	14.85	-4.52
Conservatives	1,618	12.68	-4.31
Social Liberals	1,241	9.73	-0.81
Green Left	827	6.48	+1.76
Christian People's Party	475	3.72	New
Justice Party of Denmark	214	1.68	+0.74
Left Socialists	129	1.01	-0.45
Communist Party of Denmark	91	0.71	+0.21
Total	12,758		

=== General elections in the 1960s ===
1968 Danish general election

Parties	Vote		
Parties	Votes	%	+ / -
Social Democrats	7,501	44.02	-6.91
Venstre	3,300	19.37	-0.74
Conservatives	2,896	16.99	+1.44
Social Liberals	1,796	10.54	+6.56
Green Left	805	4.72	-0.95
Left Socialists	248	1.46	New
Liberal Centre	182	1.07	-0.47
Justice Party of Denmark	161	0.94	+0.06
Communist Party of Denmark	85	0.50	+0.08
Independent Party	67	0.39	-0.53
Total	17,041		

1966 Danish general election

Parties	Vote		
Parties	Votes	%	+ / -
Social Democrats	8,588	50.93	-2.93
Venstre	3,390	20.11	-2.10
Conservatives	2,622	15.55	+0.17
Green Left	956	5.67	+3.14
Social Liberals	671	3.98	+1.27
Liberal Centre	259	1.54	New
Independent Party	155	0.92	-0.11
Justice Party of Denmark	149	0.88	-0.41
Communist Party of Denmark	71	0.42	-0.23
Total	16,861		

1964 Danish general election

Parties	Vote		
Parties	Votes	%	+ / -
Social Democrats	8,570	53.86	-0.71
Venstre	3,535	22.21	-2.02
Conservatives	2,447	15.38	+3.51
Social Liberals	431	2.71	+0.07
Green Left	403	2.53	0.00
Justice Party of Denmark	205	1.29	-1.01
Independent Party	164	1.03	-0.11
Communist Party of Denmark	103	0.65	-0.07
Danish Unity	55	0.35	New
Total	15,913		

1960 Danish general election

Parties	Vote		
Parties	Votes	%	+ / -
Social Democrats	8,337	54.57	+0.51
Venstre	3,702	24.23	+18.76
Conservatives	1,814	11.87	+10.22
Social Liberals	403	2.64	-22.25
Green Left	387	2.53	New
Justice Party of Denmark	351	2.30	-9.32
Independent Party	174	1.14	+0.56
Communist Party of Denmark	110	0.72	-1.00
Total	15,278		

=== General elections in the 1950s ===
1957 Danish general election

Parties	Vote		
Parties	Votes	%	+ / -
Social Democrats	17,734	54.06	-2.51
Social Liberals	8,166	24.89	+22.35
Justice Party of Denmark	3,813	11.62	+8.32
Venstre	1,796	5.47	-19.35
Communist Party of Denmark	564	1.72	+0.04
Conservatives	540	1.65	-9.44
Independent Party	191	0.58	New
Total	32,804		

September 1953 Danish Folketing election

Parties	Vote		
Parties	Votes	%	+ / -
Social Democrats	8,050	56.57	+0.12
Venstre	3,532	24.82	+2.47
Conservatives	1,578	11.09	-0.66
Justice Party of Denmark	469	3.30	-1.48
Social Liberals	362	2.54	-0.45
Communist Party of Denmark	239	1.68	+0.01
Total	14,230		

April 1953 Danish Folketing election

Parties	Vote		
Parties	Votes	%	+ / -
Social Democrats	7,807	56.45	+2.71
Venstre	3,091	22.35	+1.05
Conservatives	1,625	11.75	-0.66
Justice Party of Denmark	661	4.78	-2.97
Social Liberals	414	2.99	-0.25
Communist Party of Denmark	231	1.67	+0.10
Total	13,829		

1950 Danish Folketing election

Parties	Vote		
Parties	Votes	%	+ / -
Social Democrats	7,348	53.74	+0.25
Venstre	2,912	21.30	-6.34
Conservatives	1,697	12.41	+3.75
Justice Party of Denmark	1,060	7.75	+4.57
Social Liberals	443	3.24	+0.55
Communist Party of Denmark	214	1.57	-1.25
Total	13,674		

=== General elections in the 1940s ===
1947 Danish Folketing election

Parties	Vote		
Parties	Votes	%	+ / -
Social Democrats	7,412	53.49	+5.09
Venstre	3,831	27.64	+2.53
Conservatives	1,200	8.66	-3.15
Justice Party of Denmark	440	3.18	+1.27
Communist Party of Denmark	391	2.82	-2.35
Social Liberals	373	2.69	-0.61
Danish Unity	211	1.52	-2.78
Total	13,858		

1945 Danish Folketing election

Parties	Vote		
Parties	Votes	%	+ / -
Social Democrats	6,397	48.40	-9.23
Venstre	3,319	25.11	+4.86
Conservatives	1,561	11.81	-1.91
Communist Party of Denmark	683	5.17	New
Danish Unity	569	4.30	+2.26
Social Liberals	436	3.30	+1.00
Justice Party of Denmark	253	1.91	+0.48
Total	13,218		

1943 Danish Folketing election

Parties	Vote		
Parties	Votes	%	+ / -
Social Democrats	7,899	57.63	+3.99
Venstre	2,775	20.25	-1.58
Conservatives	1,880	13.72	+0.38
Social Liberals	315	2.30	-1.19
Danish Unity	279	2.04	New
Justice Party of Denmark	196	1.43	-0.53
National Socialist Workers' Party of Denmark	184	1.34	+0.28
Farmers' Party	178	1.30	-0.85
Total	13,706		

=== General elections in the 1930s ===
1939 Danish Folketing election

Parties	Vote		
Parties	Votes	%	+ / -
Social Democrats	6,432	53.64	-3.93
Venstre	2,618	21.83	+3.71
Conservatives	1,600	13.34	-2.64
Social Liberals	418	3.49	+0.75
Communist Party of Denmark	304	2.54	New
Farmers' Party	258	2.15	-0.13
Justice Party of Denmark	235	1.96	-0.17
National Socialist Workers' Party of Denmark	127	1.06	-0.13
Total	11,992		

1935 Danish Folketing election

Parties	Vote		
Parties	Votes	%	+ / -
Social Democrats	6,842	57.57	+4.34
Venstre	2,153	18.12	-4.48
Conservatives	1,899	15.98	-2.13
Social Liberals	326	2.74	-0.25
Independent People's Party	271	2.28	New
Justice Party of Denmark	253	2.13	-0.11
National Socialist Workers' Party of Denmark	141	1.19	New
Total	11,885		

1932 Danish Folketing election

Parties	Vote		
Parties	Votes	%	+ / -
Social Democrats	6,012	53.23	-1.23
Venstre	2,553	22.60	-4.16
Conservatives	2,046	18.11	+4.83
Social Liberals	338	2.99	-0.50
Justice Party of Denmark	253	2.24	+0.23
Communist Party of Denmark	93	0.82	New
Total	11,295		

=== General elections in the 1920s ===
1929 Danish Folketing election

Parties	Vote		
Parties	Votes	%	+ / -
Social Democrats	5,825	54.46	+4.27
Venstre	2,862	26.76	-0.10
Conservatives	1,420	13.28	-3.66
Social Liberals	373	3.49	+0.33
Justice Party of Denmark	215	2.01	+0.35
Total	10,695		

1926 Danish Folketing election

Parties	Vote		
Parties	Votes	%	+ / -
Social Democrats	5,205	50.19	+2.34
Venstre	2,785	26.86	-1.64
Conservatives	1,757	16.94	-1.27
Social Liberals	328	3.16	-1.44
Justice Party of Denmark	172	1.66	New
Communist Party of Denmark	123	1.19	+0.35
Total	10,370		

1924 Danish Folketing election

Parties	Vote		
Parties	Votes	%	+ / -
Social Democrats	4,626	47.85	+1.17
Venstre	2,755	28.50	-2.23
Conservatives	1,761	18.21	+0.77
Social Liberals	445	4.60	+1.03
Communist Party of Denmark	81	0.84	New
Total	9,668		

September 1920 Danish Folketing election

Parties	Vote		
Parties	Votes	%	+ / -
Social Democrats	4,389	46.68	+4.39
Venstre	2,889	30.73	-0.56
Conservatives	1,640	17.44	-3.32
Social Liberals	336	3.57	+0.25
Industry Party	148	1.57	-0.77
Total	9,402		

July 1920 Danish Folketing election

Parties	Vote		
Parties	Votes	%	+ / -
Social Democrats	3,300	42.29	+1.09
Venstre	2,442	31.29	+1.54
Conservatives	1,620	20.76	-0.55
Social Liberals	259	3.32	-1.71
Industry Party	183	2.34	-0.37
Total	7,804		

April 1920 Danish Folketing election

Parties	Vote	
Parties	Votes	%
Social Democrats	3,438	41.20
Venstre	2,483	29.75
Conservatives	1,778	21.31
Social Liberals	420	5.03
Industry Party	226	2.71
Total	8,345	

== European Parliament elections results ==
2024 European Parliament election in Denmark

Parties	Vote		
Parties	Votes	%	+ / -
Social Democrats	1,774	22.72	-19.14
Venstre	1,292	16.55	+0.17
Green Left	1,230	15.75	+9.28
Conservatives	637	8.16	+4.71
Danish People's Party	624	7.99	-6.88
Denmark Democrats	570	7.30	New
Red–Green Alliance	481	6.16	+1.98
Moderates	416	5.33	New
Social Liberals	329	4.21	-0.11
Liberal Alliance	297	3.80	+2.81
The Alternative	158	2.02	-1.03
Total	7,808		

2019 European Parliament election in Denmark

Parties	Vote		
Parties	Votes	%	+ / -
Social Democrats	4,078	41.86	+2.02
Venstre	1,596	16.38	+2.77
Danish People's Party	1,449	14.87	-8.51
Green Left	630	6.47	+0.38
People's Movement against the EU	433	4.44	-4.05
Social Liberals	421	4.32	+1.79
Red–Green Alliance	407	4.18	New
Conservatives	336	3.45	-1.72
The Alternative	297	3.05	New
Liberal Alliance	96	0.99	+0.10
Total	9,743		

2014 European Parliament election in Denmark

Parties	Vote		
Parties	Votes	%	+ / -
Social Democrats	3,145	39.84	+9.09
Danish People's Party	1,846	23.38	+9.36
Venstre	1,074	13.61	-5.85
People's Movement against the EU	670	8.49	+0.60
Green Left	481	6.09	-6.79
Conservatives	408	5.17	-4.38
Social Liberals	200	2.53	-0.16
Liberal Alliance	70	0.89	+0.43
Total	7,894		

2009 European Parliament election in Denmark

Parties	Vote		
Parties	Votes	%	+ / -
Social Democrats	2,524	30.75	-12.43
Venstre	1,597	19.46	+0.16
Danish People's Party	1,151	14.02	+7.74
Green Left	1,057	12.88	+8.61
Conservatives	784	9.55	+4.03
People's Movement against the EU	648	7.89	+2.45
Social Liberals	221	2.69	-1.08
June Movement	188	2.29	-5.82
Liberal Alliance	38	0.46	New
Total	8,208		

2004 European Parliament election in Denmark

Parties	Vote		
Parties	Votes	%	+ / -
Social Democrats	3,177	43.18	+18.70
Venstre	1,420	19.30	-9.15
June Movement	597	8.11	-6.32
Danish People's Party	462	6.28	+1.35
Conservatives	406	5.52	+1.17
People's Movement against the EU	400	5.44	-0.73
Green Left	314	4.27	-1.59
Christian Democrats	304	4.13	-0.35
Social Liberals	277	3.77	-0.98
Total	7,357		

1999 European Parliament election in Denmark

Parties	Vote		
Parties	Votes	%	+ / -
Venstre	2,120	28.45	+4.50
Social Democrats	1,824	24.48	+1.00
June Movement	1,075	14.43	+0.08
People's Movement against the EU	460	6.17	-2.17
Green Left	437	5.86	+0.18
Danish People's Party	367	4.93	New
Social Liberals	354	4.75	-1.79
Christian Democrats	334	4.48	+0.67
Conservatives	324	4.35	-6.16
Centre Democrats	156	2.09	+1.40
Progress Party	37	0.50	-2.15
Total	7,451		

1994 European Parliament election in Denmark

Parties	Vote		
Parties	Votes	%	+ / -
Venstre	2,016	23.95	-6.51
Social Democrats	1,977	23.48	-3.08
June Movement	1,208	14.35	New
Conservatives	885	10.51	+5.79
People's Movement against the EU	702	8.34	-10.40
Social Liberals	551	6.54	+5.54
Green Left	478	5.68	-0.82
Christian Democrats	321	3.81	-0.83
Progress Party	223	2.65	-1.54
Centre Democrats	58	0.69	-2.49
Total	8,419		

1989 European Parliament election in Denmark

Parties	Vote		
Parties	Votes	%	+ / -
Venstre	2,638	30.46	+17.70
Social Democrats	2,300	26.56	+0.37
People's Movement against the EU	1,623	18.74	-1.83
Green Left	563	6.50	0.00
Conservatives	409	4.72	-9.14
Christian Democrats	402	4.64	-0.70
Progress Party	363	4.19	-3.05
Centre Democrats	275	3.18	-1.94
Social Liberals	87	1.00	-0.92
Total	8,660		

1984 European Parliament election in Denmark

Parties	Vote	
Parties	Votes	%
Social Democrats	2,626	26.19
People's Movement against the EU	2,062	20.57
Conservatives	1,390	13.86
Venstre	1,279	12.76
Progress Party	726	7.24
Green Left	652	6.50
Christian Democrats	535	5.34
Centre Democrats	513	5.12
Social Liberals	193	1.92
Left Socialists	50	0.50
Total	10,026	

== Referendums ==
2022 Danish European Union opt-out referendum

Option	Votes	%
✓ YES	6,390	63.34
X NO	3,699	36.66

2015 Danish European Union opt-out referendum

Option	Votes	%
X NO	5,621	53.24
✓ YES	4,936	46.76

2014 Danish Unified Patent Court membership referendum

Option	Votes	%
✓ YES	4,991	65.22
X NO	2,661	34.78

2009 Danish Act of Succession referendum

Option	Votes	%
✓ YES	6,401	82.60
X NO	1,348	17.40

2000 Danish euro referendum

Option	Votes	%
X NO	7,904	57.82
✓ YES	5,767	42.18

1998 Danish Amsterdam Treaty referendum

Option	Votes	%
✓ YES	6,361	53.37
X NO	5,558	46.63

1993 Danish Maastricht Treaty referendum

Option	Votes	%
✓ YES	7,496	54.23
X NO	6,326	45.77

1992 Danish Maastricht Treaty referendum

Option	Votes	%
X NO	6,705	50.59
✓ YES	6,549	49.41

1986 Danish Single European Act referendum

Option	Votes	%
✓ YES	6,385	52.26
X NO	5,832	47.74

1972 Danish European Communities membership referendum

Option	Votes	%
✓ YES	8,003	60.20
X NO	5,292	39.80

1953 Danish constitutional and electoral age referendum

Option	Votes	%
✓ YES	9,627	89.97
X NO	1,073	10.03
21 years	5,636	51.16
23 years	5,380	48.84

1939 Danish constitutional referendum

Option	Votes	%
✓ YES	7,325	92.90
X NO	560	7.10
