= Karina Adsbøl =

Danish politician (born 1976)

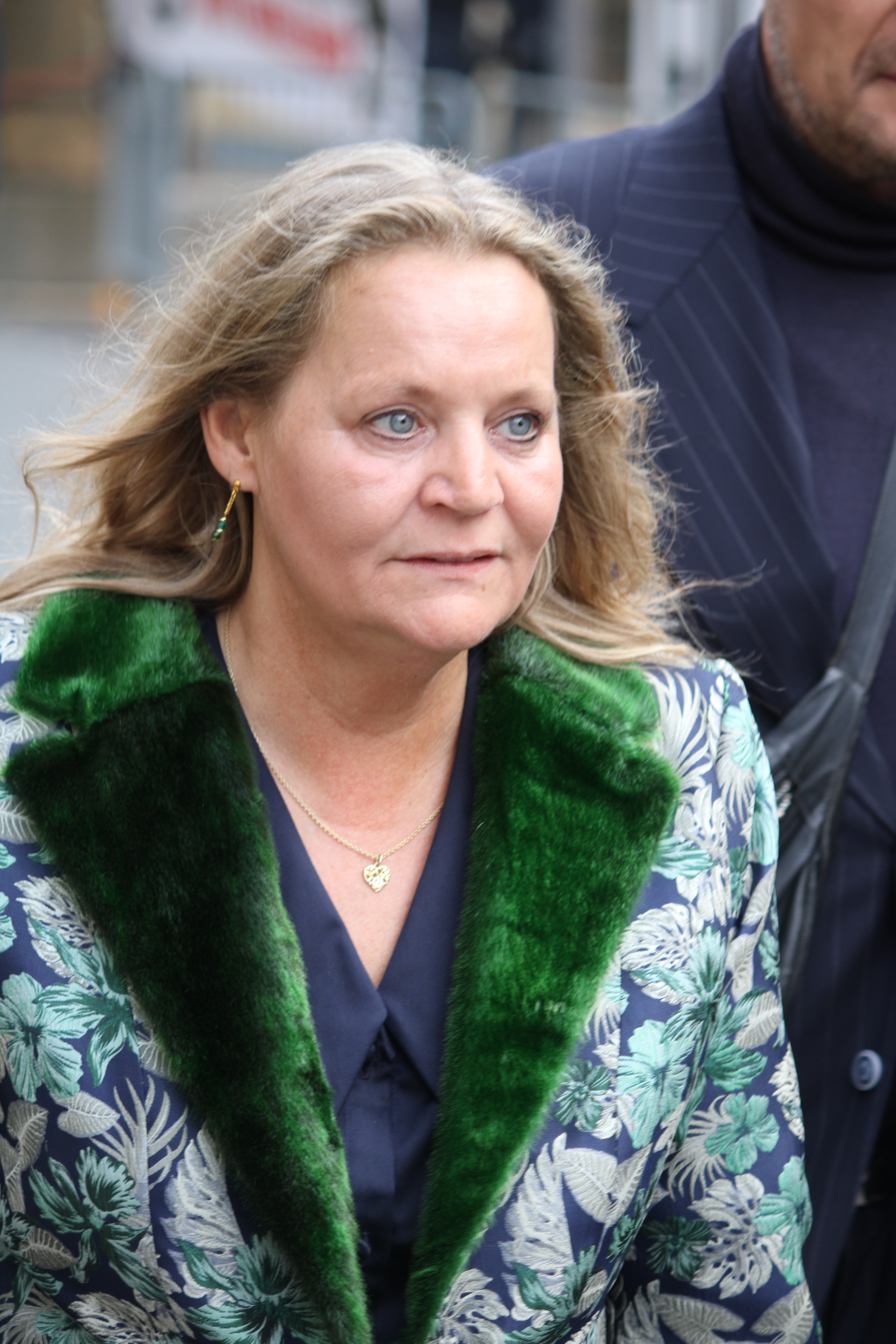
- Adsbøl in 2025

Member of the Folketing
- Incumbent
- Assumed office 15 September 2011
- Constituency: South Jutland

Personal details
- Born: 26 November 1976 (age 49) Kolding, Denmark
- Party: Denmark Democrats (2022–present)
- Other political affiliations: Danish People's Party (until 2022)
- Education: University College South Denmark

Karina Adsbøl (born 26 November 1976) is a Danish politician who has been a member of the Folketing since 2011. She was a member of the Danish People's Party until 2022, when she joined the Denmark Democrats. During her tenure in the Folketing she has been the spokesperson on multiple issues and chaired multiple committees.

== Early life and education ==
Karina Adsbøl was born in Kolding, Denmark, on 28 November 1976, to Hans Erik Adsbøl, a member of the city council, and Britta Adsbøl. She attended Kolding Commercial School from 1993 to 1994, and Social and Health School in Fredericia from 1999 to 2000 and 2004 to 2005.

== Career ==
In the 2011 election Adsbøl was elected to the Folketing from Kolding North as a member of the Danish People's Party (DPP). Her constituency was changed to Kolding South in 2013. She left the DPP in 2022, and joined the Denmark Democrats. She announced in 2025, that she will not run for another term in the next Danish general election.

For the DPP she was their spokesperson for disability from 2011 to 2022, for housing from 2011 to 2015, for equality from 2015 to 2020, and social and elderly from2019 to 2022. During her tenure in the Folketing she was the chair of the Equality committee from 2015 to 2019, and has been the chair of the Children and Education committee since 2023. She is currently the second vice president of the presidium of the Folketing.

Adsbøl supported Merete Dea Larsen for the leadership of DPP in 2022.

== Personal life ==
On 11 October 2022, Adsbøl's son was hit by a car and underwent surgery after both of his femurs were broken.

== Works cited ==
=== News ===
- "Karina Adsbøl støtter Merete Dea Larsen". Ditoverblik. 21 January 2022. Archived from the original on 22 June 2025.
- "To folketingsmedlemmer fra Danmarksdemokraterne stopper efter næste valg". Berlingske. 15 January 2025. Archived from the original on 22 June 2025.
- Nielsen, Nicklas (18 October 2022). "Politikers søn blev lagt i respirator efter voldsom ulykke – få dage efter tog familien på gaden: 'En forælders værste mareridt'". Vejle Amts Folkeblad. Archived from the original on 22 June 2025.

=== Web ===
- "Karina Adsbøl (DD)". Folketing. Archived from the original on 22 June 2025.
