= Vejle South (nomination district) =

- Vejle Syd
- Nomination district constituency for the Folketing
- Location of Vejle South within South Jutland

- Location of South Jutland within Denmark
- Municipalities: Vejle
- Constituency: South Jutland
- Electorate: 44,312 (2022)

Current constituency
- Created: 2007

Vejle South nominating district is one of the 92 nominating districts that was created for Danish elections following the 2007 municipal reform. It is one of the nomination districts in Vejle Municipality, the other being Vejle North.

In general elections, parties commonly associated with the blue bloc usually receive more votes.

== General elections results ==
=== General elections in the 2020s ===
2022 Danish general election

| Parties | Vote | | |
| Parties | Votes | % | + / - |
|---|---|---|---|
| Social Democrats | 9,722 | 27.11 | +1.72 |
| Venstre | 5,968 | 16.64 | -9.54 |
| Moderates | 3,612 | 10.07 | New |
| Denmark Democrats | 3,140 | 8.76 | New |
| Liberal Alliance | 3,041 | 8.48 | +5.83 |
| Green Left | 2,619 | 7.30 | +1.17 |
| Conservatives | 1,778 | 4.96 | -0.60 |
| New Right | 1,641 | 4.58 | +1.40 |
| Social Liberals | 1,180 | 3.29 | -4.70 |
| Red–Green Alliance | 1,141 | 3.18 | -1.35 |
| Danish People's Party | 759 | 2.12 | -9.53 |
| The Alternative | 728 | 2.03 | +0.01 |
| Christian Democrats | 255 | 0.71 | -1.66 |
| Independent Greens | 247 | 0.69 | New |
| Kent Nielsen | 28 | 0.08 | New |
| Kenneth Vestergaard | 2 | 0.01 | New |
| Total | 35,861 | | |

=== General elections in the 2010s ===
2019 Danish general election

| Parties | Vote | | |
| Parties | Votes | % | + / - |
|---|---|---|---|
| Venstre | 9,282 | 26.18 | +5.95 |
| Social Democrats | 9,002 | 25.39 | +0.89 |
| Danish People's Party | 4,131 | 11.65 | -14.55 |
| Social Liberals | 2,832 | 7.99 | +3.84 |
| Green Left | 2,173 | 6.13 | +2.45 |
| Conservatives | 1,971 | 5.56 | +3.44 |
| Red–Green Alliance | 1,606 | 4.53 | -0.92 |
| New Right | 1,126 | 3.18 | New |
| Liberal Alliance | 941 | 2.65 | -6.22 |
| Christian Democrats | 841 | 2.37 | +1.13 |
| The Alternative | 717 | 2.02 | -1.55 |
| Stram Kurs | 545 | 1.54 | New |
| Klaus Riskær Pedersen Party | 282 | 0.80 | New |
| Michael Thomsen | 10 | 0.03 | New |
| Total | 35,459 | | |

2015 Danish general election

| Parties | Vote | | |
| Parties | Votes | % | + / - |
|---|---|---|---|
| Danish People's Party | 9,166 | 26.20 | +10.29 |
| Social Democrats | 8,571 | 24.50 | +0.46 |
| Venstre | 7,079 | 20.23 | -7.46 |
| Liberal Alliance | 3,103 | 8.87 | +3.07 |
| Red–Green Alliance | 1,906 | 5.45 | +0.75 |
| Social Liberals | 1,451 | 4.15 | -4.02 |
| Green Left | 1,288 | 3.68 | -4.69 |
| The Alternative | 1,250 | 3.57 | New |
| Conservatives | 741 | 2.12 | -2.11 |
| Christian Democrats | 434 | 1.24 | +0.17 |
| Total | 34,989 | | |

2011 Danish general election

| Parties | Vote | | |
| Parties | Votes | % | + / - |
|---|---|---|---|
| Venstre | 9,689 | 27.69 | -1.78 |
| Social Democrats | 8,412 | 24.04 | +1.44 |
| Danish People's Party | 5,569 | 15.91 | +0.14 |
| Green Left | 2,930 | 8.37 | -5.08 |
| Social Liberals | 2,860 | 8.17 | +3.81 |
| Liberal Alliance | 2,031 | 5.80 | +3.24 |
| Red–Green Alliance | 1,643 | 4.70 | +3.56 |
| Conservatives | 1,480 | 4.23 | -5.18 |
| Christian Democrats | 374 | 1.07 | -0.17 |
| Jørn Bjorholm | 4 | 0.01 | New |
| Niesl-Aage Bjerre | 2 | 0.01 | New |
| Total | 34,994 | | |

=== General elections in the 2000s ===
2007 Danish general election

| Parties | Vote | | |
| Parties | Votes | % | + / - |
|---|---|---|---|
| Venstre | 9,917 | 29.47 | |
| Social Democrats | 7,607 | 22.60 | |
| Danish People's Party | 5,308 | 15.77 | |
| Green Left | 4,526 | 13.45 | |
| Conservatives | 3,167 | 9.41 | |
| Social Liberals | 1,468 | 4.36 | |
| New Alliance | 860 | 2.56 | |
| Christian Democrats | 417 | 1.24 | |
| Red–Green Alliance | 383 | 1.14 | |
| Total | 33,653 | | |

== European Parliament elections results ==
2024 European Parliament election in Denmark

| Parties | Vote | | |
| Parties | Votes | % | + / - |
|---|---|---|---|
| Venstre | 4,363 | 17.67 | -8.90 |
| Social Democrats | 4,175 | 16.91 | -5.68 |
| Green Left | 3,518 | 14.25 | +4.14 |
| Conservatives | 2,762 | 11.18 | +5.98 |
| Liberal Alliance | 1,937 | 7.84 | +4.97 |
| Denmark Democrats | 1,780 | 7.21 | New |
| Danish People's Party | 1,745 | 7.07 | -6.50 |
| Moderates | 1,472 | 5.96 | New |
| Social Liberals | 1,424 | 5.77 | -3.50 |
| Red–Green Alliance | 1,024 | 4.15 | -0.11 |
| The Alternative | 495 | 2.00 | -0.54 |
| Total | 24,695 | | |

2019 European Parliament election in Denmark

| Parties | Vote | | |
| Parties | Votes | % | + / - |
|---|---|---|---|
| Venstre | 7,304 | 26.57 | +6.80 |
| Social Democrats | 6,210 | 22.59 | +3.80 |
| Danish People's Party | 3,731 | 13.57 | -17.14 |
| Green Left | 2,781 | 10.11 | +2.23 |
| Social Liberals | 2,550 | 9.27 | +3.79 |
| Conservatives | 1,429 | 5.20 | -2.57 |
| Red–Green Alliance | 1,172 | 4.26 | New |
| People's Movement against the EU | 831 | 3.02 | -3.51 |
| Liberal Alliance | 789 | 2.87 | -0.21 |
| The Alternative | 697 | 2.54 | New |
| Total | 27,494 | | |

2014 European Parliament election in Denmark

| Parties | Vote | | |
| Parties | Votes | % | + / - |
|---|---|---|---|
| Danish People's Party | 6,834 | 30.71 | +13.07 |
| Venstre | 4,399 | 19.77 | -3.32 |
| Social Democrats | 4,181 | 18.79 | -1.18 |
| Green Left | 1,753 | 7.88 | -6.70 |
| Conservatives | 1,729 | 7.77 | -5.13 |
| People's Movement against the EU | 1,452 | 6.53 | +0.63 |
| Social Liberals | 1,219 | 5.48 | +2.09 |
| Liberal Alliance | 685 | 3.08 | +2.61 |
| Total | 22,252 | | |

2009 European Parliament election in Denmark

| Parties | Vote | | |
| Parties | Votes | % | + / - |
|---|---|---|---|
| Venstre | 5,184 | 23.09 | |
| Social Democrats | 4,484 | 19.97 | |
| Danish People's Party | 3,960 | 17.64 | |
| Green Left | 3,273 | 14.58 | |
| Conservatives | 2,896 | 12.90 | |
| People's Movement against the EU | 1,325 | 5.90 | |
| Social Liberals | 761 | 3.39 | |
| June Movement | 466 | 2.08 | |
| Liberal Alliance | 105 | 0.47 | |
| Total | 22,454 | | |

== Referendums ==
2022 Danish European Union opt-out referendum

| Option | Votes | % |
|---|---|---|
| ✓ YES | 18,714 | 67.17 |
| X NO | 9,147 | 32.83 |

2015 Danish European Union opt-out referendum

| Option | Votes | % |
|---|---|---|
| X NO | 15,678 | 53.92 |
| ✓ YES | 13,401 | 46.08 |

2014 Danish Unified Patent Court membership referendum

| Option | Votes | % |
|---|---|---|
| ✓ YES | 13,247 | 60.87 |
| X NO | 8,514 | 39.13 |

2009 Danish Act of Succession referendum

| Option | Votes | % |
|---|---|---|
| ✓ YES | 18,492 | 86.13 |
| X NO | 2,977 | 13.87 |
