= Vejen (nomination district) =

- Vejen
- Nomination district constituency for the Folketing
- Location of Vejen within South Jutland

- Location of South Jutland within Denmark
- Municipalities: Billund; Vejen
- Constituency: South Jutland
- Electorate: 49,002 (2022)

Current constituency
- Created: 2007

Vejen nominating district is one of the 92 nominating districts that was created for Danish elections following the 2007 municipal reform. It consists of Billund and Vejen municipality.

In general elections, the district is a very strong area for parties commonly associated with the blue bloc.

== General elections results ==
=== General elections in the 2020s ===
2022 Danish general election

Parties	Vote		
Parties	Votes	%	+ / -
Social Democrats	10,294	25.39	+0.17
Venstre	8,547	21.08	-12.07
Denmark Democrats	5,583	13.77	New
Moderates	3,409	8.41	New
New Right	2,980	7.35	+2.93
Liberal Alliance	2,965	7.31	+5.30
Conservatives	1,826	4.50	-0.13
Green Left	1,693	4.18	+0.50
Danish People's Party	1,187	2.93	-10.73
Social Liberals	663	1.64	-2.74
Red–Green Alliance	607	1.50	-1.41
The Alternative	396	0.98	-0.17
Christian Democrats	298	0.73	-1.73
Independent Greens	49	0.12	New
Kent Nielsen	33	0.08	New
Kenneth Vestergaard	17	0.04	New
Total	40,547		

=== General elections in the 2010s ===
2019 Danish general election

Parties	Vote		
Parties	Votes	%	+ / -
Venstre	13,614	33.15	+4.81
Social Democrats	10,356	25.22	+4.00
Danish People's Party	5,610	13.66	-16.35
Conservatives	1,901	4.63	+2.54
New Right	1,817	4.42	New
Social Liberals	1,800	4.38	+2.25
Green Left	1,511	3.68	+1.28
Red–Green Alliance	1,197	2.91	-0.71
Christian Democrats	1,009	2.46	+1.28
Liberal Alliance	827	2.01	-5.14
Stram Kurs	653	1.59	New
The Alternative	473	1.15	-0.70
Klaus Riskær Pedersen Party	279	0.68	New
Michael Thomsen	20	0.05	New
Total	41,067		

2015 Danish general election

Parties	Vote		
Parties	Votes	%	+ / -
Danish People's Party	12,862	30.01	+14.71
Venstre	12,143	28.34	-10.51
Social Democrats	9,095	21.22	-0.64
Liberal Alliance	3,065	7.15	+2.09
Red–Green Alliance	1,550	3.62	+1.09
Green Left	1,029	2.40	-3.56
Social Liberals	913	2.13	-3.46
Conservatives	896	2.09	-1.50
The Alternative	794	1.85	New
Christian Democrats	506	1.18	-0.02
Total	42,853		

2011 Danish general election

Parties	Vote		
Parties	Votes	%	+ / -
Venstre	16,862	38.85	-2.02
Social Democrats	9,487	21.86	+1.45
Danish People's Party	6,642	15.30	-0.17
Green Left	2,587	5.96	-2.68
Social Liberals	2,425	5.59	+2.46
Liberal Alliance	2,197	5.06	+3.18
Conservatives	1,559	3.59	-4.33
Red–Green Alliance	1,098	2.53	+2.02
Christian Democrats	520	1.20	+0.02
Niesl-Aage Bjerre	16	0.04	New
Jørn Bjorholm	7	0.02	New
Total	43,400		

=== General elections in the 2000s ===
2007 Danish general election

Parties	Vote		
Parties	Votes	%	+ / -
Venstre	17,310	40.87	
Social Democrats	8,647	20.41	
Danish People's Party	6,553	15.47	
Green Left	3,658	8.64	
Conservatives	3,353	7.92	
Social Liberals	1,324	3.13	
New Alliance	795	1.88	
Christian Democrats	501	1.18	
Red–Green Alliance	216	0.51	
Total	42,357		

== European Parliament elections results ==
2024 European Parliament election in Denmark

Parties	Vote		
Parties	Votes	%	+ / -
Venstre	7,192	27.07	-6.33
Social Democrats	3,848	14.48	-6.13
Denmark Democrats	3,507	13.20	New
Green Left	2,394	9.01	+2.27
Danish People's Party	2,251	8.47	-8.48
Conservatives	2,187	8.23	+3.05
Liberal Alliance	2,036	7.66	+4.12
Moderates	1,345	5.06	New
Social Liberals	909	3.42	-2.79
Red–Green Alliance	539	2.03	-0.97
The Alternative	363	1.37	-0.05
Total	26,571		

2019 European Parliament election in Denmark

Parties	Vote		
Parties	Votes	%	+ / -
Venstre	10,369	33.40	+5.54
Social Democrats	6,400	20.61	+5.47
Danish People's Party	5,264	16.95	-14.39
Green Left	2,092	6.74	+1.40
Social Liberals	1,928	6.21	+2.77
Conservatives	1,607	5.18	-4.64
Liberal Alliance	1,100	3.54	+0.74
Red–Green Alliance	930	3.00	New
People's Movement against the EU	916	2.95	-1.31
The Alternative	441	1.42	New
Total	31,047		

2014 European Parliament election in Denmark

Parties	Vote		
Parties	Votes	%	+ / -
Danish People's Party	8,208	31.34	+14.89
Venstre	7,296	27.86	-3.24
Social Democrats	3,965	15.14	-3.12
Conservatives	2,573	9.82	-4.89
Green Left	1,398	5.34	-4.95
People's Movement against the EU	1,115	4.26	+0.09
Social Liberals	902	3.44	+0.71
Liberal Alliance	734	2.80	+2.35
Total	26,191		

2009 European Parliament election in Denmark

Parties	Vote		
Parties	Votes	%	+ / -
Venstre	8,565	31.10	
Social Democrats	5,028	18.26	
Danish People's Party	4,530	16.45	
Conservatives	4,052	14.71	
Green Left	2,833	10.29	
People's Movement against the EU	1,147	4.17	
Social Liberals	753	2.73	
June Movement	508	1.84	
Liberal Alliance	123	0.45	
Total	27,539		

== Referendums ==
2022 Danish European Union opt-out referendum

Option	Votes	%
✓ YES	19,486	61.67
X NO	12,109	38.33

2015 Danish European Union opt-out referendum

Option	Votes	%
X NO	19,742	55.01
✓ YES	16,146	44.99

2014 Danish Unified Patent Court membership referendum

Option	Votes	%
✓ YES	16,680	65.33
X NO	8,850	34.67

2009 Danish Act of Succession referendum

Option	Votes	%
✓ YES	23,218	86.95
X NO	3,485	13.05
