= Skriver =

Skriver is a surname. Notable people with the surname include:

- Ina Skriver (born 1945), Danish actress
- Josephine Skriver (born 1993), Danish model
- Kris Skriver, Danish politician
- Sofia Skriver (born 2003), Danish ice hockey player
- Søren Skriver (born 1973), Danish footballer
- Thomas Skriver Jensen (born 1996), Danish politician
