= South Jutland (Folketing constituency) =

Constituency of the Folketing, the national legislature of Denmark

- Sydjylland
- Constituency for the Folketing
- Location of South Jutland within Denmark
- Municipality: List: Aabenraa; Billund; Esbjerg; Fanø; Fredericia; Haderslev; Kolding; Sønderborg; Tønder; Varde; Vejen; Vejle
- Region: Southern Denmark
- Population: 733,911 (2026)
- Electorate: 521,844 (2026)
- Area: 8,785 km^{2} (2022)

Current constituency
- Created: 2007
- Seats: List: 17 (2022–present); 18 (2007–2022)
- Members of the Folketing: List: Karina Adsbøl (Æ); Helena Artmann Andresen (I); Henrik Dahl (I); Benny Engelbrecht (A); Søren Espersen (Æ); Henrik Frandsen (M); Niels Flemming Hansen (C); Mette Kierkgaard (M); Peter Kofod (O); Anders Kronborg (A); Karina Lorentzen (F); Christian Rabjerg Madsen (A); Anni Matthiesen (V); Christoffer Aagaard Melson (V); Jesper Petersen (A); Kenneth Fredslund Petersen (Æ); Søren Egge Rasmussen (Ø); Lotte Rod (B); Hans Christian Schmidt (V); Kris Jensen Skriver (A); Pernille Vermund (I); Birgitte Vind (A)
- Created from: Ribe County; South Jutland County

South Jutland (Danish: Sydjylland) is one of the 12 multi-member constituencies of the Folketing, the national legislature of Denmark. The constituency was established in 2007 following the public administration structural reform. It consists of the municipalities of Aabenraa, Billund, Esbjerg, Fanø, Fredericia, Haderslev, Kolding, Sønderborg, Tønder, Varde, Vejen and Vejle. The constituency currently elects 17 of the 179 members of the Folketing using the open party-list proportional representation electoral system. At the 2026 general election it had 521,844 registered electors.

== Electoral system ==
South Jutland currently elects 17 of the 179 members of the Folketing using the open party-list proportional representation electoral system. Constituency seats are allocated using the D'Hondt method. Compensatory seats are calculated based on the national vote and are allocated using the Sainte-Laguë method, initially at the provincial level and finally at the constituency level. Only parties that reach any one of three thresholds stipulated by section 77 of the Folketing (Parliamentary) Elections Act - winning at least one constituency seat; obtaining at least the Hare quota (valid votes in province/number of constituency seats in province) in two of the three provinces; or obtaining at least 2% of the national vote - compete for compensatory seats.

== Election results ==
=== Summary ===
Election	Red–Green Ø			Green Left F			Alternative Å			Social Democrats A			Social Liberals B			Venstre V			Conservative People's C			Liberal Alliance I / Y			Danish People's O		
Election	Votes	%	Seats	Votes	%	Seats	Votes	%	Seats	Votes	%	Seats	Votes	%	Seats	Votes	%	Seats	Votes	%	Seats	Votes	%	Seats	Votes	%	Seats
2026	13,613	3.20%	0	36,249	8.51%	2	4,512	1.06%	0	96,612	22.68%	5	12,146	2.85%	0	72,194	16.94%	3	22,378	5.25%	1	43,657	10.25%	2	48,404	11.36%	2
2022	10,316	2.40%	0	24,870	5.78%	1	6,138	1.43%	0	122,001	28.38%	6	9,972	2.32%	0	70,740	16.45%	3	20,726	4.82%	1	32,580	7.58%	1	12,109	2.82%	0
2019	17,773	4.09%	0	22,469	5.17%	1	7,172	1.65%	0	113,641	26.13%	6	25,551	5.87%	1	124,007	28.51%	6	22,049	5.07%	1	9,310	2.14%	0	54,258	12.48%	3
2015	22,614	5.09%	1	13,508	3.04%	0	11,551	2.60%	0	104,391	23.50%	5	13,962	3.14%	0	104,483	23.52%	5	9,625	2.17%	0	33,277	7.49%	1	126,058	28.37%	6
2011	17,266	3.83%	0	34,717	7.70%	1				108,937	24.15%	5	29,742	6.59%	1	149,148	33.06%	7	17,905	3.97%	0	21,912	4.86%	1	66,666	14.78%	3
2007	3,626	0.82%	0	50,484	11.37%	2				101,557	22.86%	5	15,201	3.42%	0	153,688	34.60%	7	37,055	8.34%	1	8,481	1.91%	0	69,762	15.71%	3

(Excludes compensatory seats)

=== Detailed ===
==== 2026 ====
Results of the 2026 general election held on 24 March 2026:

Party		Votes per nomination district													Total Votes	%	Seats		
Party		Aaben- raa	Greater Esbjerg	Esbjerg City	Frede- ricia	Hader- slev	Kolding North	Kolding South	Sønder- borg	Tønder	Varde	Vejen	Vejle North	Vejle South	Total Votes	%	Con.	Com.	Tot.
Social Democrats	A	7,293	7,574	9,453	8,126	7,848	5,132	7,931	11,125	4,297	5,982	8,201	7,247	8,070	96,612	22.68%	5	0	5
Venstre	V	6,056	6,825	5,276	3,428	4,992	3,903	4,286	6,609	4,024	7,106	8,589	5,767	5,333	72,194	16.94%	3	0	3
Danish People's Party	O	4,405	3,518	4,056	3,703	4,792	2,589	3,488	5,162	2,637	2,877	4,440	3,184	3,553	48,404	11.36%	2	1	3
Liberal Alliance	I	3,053	3,550	3,512	3,271	2,951	3,001	3,661	4,173	1,781	3,042	4,297	3,606	3,759	43,657	10.25%	2	0	2
Green Left	F	2,182	2,853	3,871	3,226	2,370	2,620	3,118	3,038	1,234	1,898	2,482	3,524	3,833	36,249	8.51%	2	0	2
Denmark Democrats	Æ	3,195	2,586	1,720	1,666	2,494	1,299	1,912	3,279	2,672	3,564	4,629	2,600	1,964	33,580	7.88%	1	1	2
Moderates	M	1,953	2,180	1,799	2,333	2,081	2,305	2,245	2,955	1,764	1,762	2,491	3,187	3,033	30,088	7.06%	1	1	2
Conservative People's Party	C	1,720	1,706	2,062	1,755	1,750	1,790	1,709	1,793	635	1,272	1,725	2,288	2,173	22,378	5.25%	1	0	1
Red–Green Alliance	Ø	684	840	2,019	1,460	972	1,246	1,077	1,215	348	516	707	1,088	1,441	13,613	3.20%	0	1	1
Citizens' Party	H	1,216	984	994	847	1,195	528	902	1,317	752	933	1,440	764	758	12,630	2.96%	0	1	1
Danish Social Liberal Party	B	674	873	1,146	889	729	1,082	1,007	1,131	269	509	732	1,563	1,542	12,146	2.85%	0	0	0
The Alternative	Å	269	304	444	405	284	330	375	405	137	217	314	463	565	4,512	1.06%	0	0	0
Valid votes		32,700	33,793	36,352	31,109	32,458	25,825	30,044	43,376	20,550	29,678	40,047	35,281	36,024	426,063	100.00%	17	5	22
Blank votes		370	380	515	428	436	293	370	668	274	387	442	413	413	5,229	1.00%			
Rejected votes – other		99	60	140	73	74	63	84	215	76	67	92	75	94	1,134	0.26%			
Total polled		33,169	34,240	37,007	31,610	32,968	26,181	30,498	44,259	20,900	30,127	40,581	35,769	36,531	432,426	82.86%			
Registered electors		40,470	40,136	46,904	38,784	40,184	31,626	36,548	53,712	25,413	35,518	48,458	41,391	44,338	521,844				
Turnout		81.96%	85.31%	78.90%	81.50%	82.04%	83.64%	83.45%	82.40%	82.24%	84.82%	83.74%	86.42%	82.39%	82.86%				

The following candidates were elected:

- Constituency seats - Karina Adsbøl (Æ), 2,370 votes; Helena Artmann Andresen (I), 2,387 votes; Rune Bønnelykke (O), 814 votes; Benny Engelbrecht (A), 7,275 votes; Henrik Frandsen (M), 4,471 votes; Cecilie Liv Hansen (I), 2,569 votes; Peter Kofod (O), 15,993 votes; Anders Kronborg (A), 5,728 votes; Jørgen Kvist (F), 1,197 votes; Karina Lorentzen (F), 8,246 votes; Stephanie Lose (V), 41,544 votes; Christian Rabjerg Madsen (A), 7,844 votes; Anni Matthiesen (V), 7,978 votes; Christoffer Aagaard Melson (V), 6,028 votes; Frederik Bloch Münster (C), 2,081 votes; Jesper Petersen (A), 6,188 votes; and Birgitte Vind (A), 6,220 votes.
- Compensatory seats - Frida Bruun (M), 3,193 votes; Nadja Natalie Isaksen (H), 1,301 votes; Josephine Alstrup Kofod (O), 734 votes; Ulrik Knudsen (Æ), 2,023 votes; and Rasmus Vestergaard Madsen (Ø), 2,458 votes.

==== 2022 ====
Results of the 2022 general election held on 1 November 2022:

Party		Votes per nomination district													Total Votes	%	Seats		
Party		Aaben- raa	Greater Esbjerg	Esbjerg City	Frede- ricia	Hader- slev	Kolding North	Kolding South	Sønder- borg	Tønder	Varde	Vejen	Vejle North	Vejle South	Total Votes	%	Con.	Com.	Tot.
Social Democrats	A	9,695	9,505	12,465	10,317	10,016	6,383	7,931	14,548	5,601	7,276	10,294	8,248	9,722	122,001	28.38%	6	0	6
Venstre	V	5,357	5,864	4,518	3,438	5,488	4,012	4,269	6,607	3,277	6,965	8,547	6,430	5,968	70,740	16.45%	3	0	3
Denmark Democrats	Æ	4,775	3,875	3,155	2,877	3,737	2,265	3,033	4,918	3,190	4,272	5,583	3,634	3,140	48,454	11.27%	2	1	3
Moderates	M	2,736	3,253	2,979	3,111	2,722	2,861	2,834	3,660	2,701	2,522	3,409	3,665	3,612	40,065	9.32%	2	0	2
Liberal Alliance	I	2,234	2,782	2,946	2,417	2,075	2,592	2,632	2,798	1,194	2,035	2,965	2,869	3,041	32,580	7.58%	1	1	2
The New Right	D	2,665	2,110	1,919	1,638	2,504	1,326	1,763	3,039	1,681	1,947	2,980	1,566	1,641	26,779	6.23%	1	0	1
Green Left	F	1,454	1,993	2,739	2,050	1,614	1,914	2,183	2,023	1,074	1,188	1,693	2,326	2,619	24,870	5.78%	1	0	1
Conservative People's Party	C	1,558	1,565	1,927	1,443	1,408	1,468	1,561	1,636	983	1,570	1,826	2,003	1,778	20,726	4.82%	1	0	1
Danish People's Party	O	1,158	871	1,101	881	1,168	704	915	1,266	641	768	1,187	690	759	12,109	2.82%	0	1	1
Red–Green Alliance	Ø	618	648	1,406	1,010	809	758	752	967	335	442	607	823	1,141	10,316	2.40%	0	1	1
Danish Social Liberal Party	B	661	693	939	652	579	880	902	932	277	461	663	1,153	1,180	9,972	2.32%	0	1	1
The Alternative	Å	359	392	619	546	472	489	475	537	178	288	396	659	728	6,138	1.43%	0	0	0
Christian Democrats	K	220	192	188	197	319	124	252	210	192	277	298	315	255	3,039	0.71%	0	0	0
Independent Greens	Q	82	50	241	108	114	256	85	206	26	40	49	280	247	1,784	0.41%	0	0	0
Kent Nielsen (Independent)		26	10	46	23	16	19	13	24	20	12	33	21	28	291	0.07%	0	0	0
Kenneth Vestergaard (Independent)		10	3	4	2	4	3	1	5	2	2	17	3	2	58	0.01%	0	0	0
Valid votes		33,608	33,806	37,192	30,710	33,045	26,054	29,601	43,376	21,372	30,065	40,547	34,685	35,861	429,922	100.00%	17	5	22
Blank votes		491	469	603	496	565	348	433	668	317	427	571	483	499	6,370	1.45%			
Rejected votes – other		125	135	153	102	172	107	100	215	101	122	157	124	161	1,774	0.40%			
Total polled		34,224	34,410	37,948	31,308	33,782	26,509	30,134	44,259	21,790	30,614	41,275	35,292	36,521	438,066	83.20%			
Registered electors		41,587	40,317	47,777	38,502	40,657	31,693	35,952	53,712	26,559	35,999	49,002	40,478	44,312	526,547				
Turnout		82.29%	85.35%	79.43%	81.32%	83.09%	83.64%	83.82%	82.40%	82.04%	85.04%	84.23%	87.19%	82.42%	83.20%				

Votes per municipality:

Party		Votes per municipality												Total Votes
Party		Aaben- raa	Bil- lund	Esbjerg	Fanø	Frede- ricia	Hader- slev	Kolding	Sønder- borg	Tønder	Varde	Vejen	Vejle	Total Votes
Social Democrats	A	9,695	3,961	21,273	697	10,317	10,016	14,314	14,548	5,601	7,276	6,333	17,970	122,001
Venstre	V	5,357	3,593	10,176	206	3,438	5,488	8,281	6,607	3,277	6,965	4,954	12,398	70,740
Denmark Democrats	Æ	4,775	2,294	6,832	198	2,877	3,737	5,298	4,918	3,190	4,272	3,289	6,774	48,454
Moderates	M	2,736	1,321	6,012	220	3,111	2,722	5,695	3,660	2,701	2,522	2,088	7,277	40,065
Liberal Alliance	I	2,234	1,036	5,587	141	2,417	2,075	5,224	2,798	1,194	2,035	1,929	5,910	32,580
The New Right	D	2,665	934	3,948	81	1,638	2,504	3,089	3,039	1,681	1,947	2,046	3,207	26,779
Green Left	F	1,454	489	4,513	219	2,050	1,614	4,097	2,023	1,074	1,188	1,204	4,945	24,870
Conservative People's Party	C	1,558	587	3,308	184	1,443	1,408	3,029	1,636	983	1,570	1,239	3,781	20,726
Danish People's Party	O	1,158	419	1,936	36	881	1,168	1,619	1,266	641	768	768	1,449	12,109
Red–Green Alliance	Ø	618	203	1,897	157	1,010	809	1,510	967	335	442	404	1,964	10,316
Danish Social Liberal Party	B	661	254	1,552	80	652	579	1,782	932	277	461	409	2,333	9,972
The Alternative	Å	359	135	888	123	546	472	964	537	178	288	261	1,387	6,138
Christian Democrats	K	220	142	371	9	197	319	376	210	192	277	156	570	3,039
Independent Greens	Q	82	21	290	1	108	114	341	206	26	40	28	527	1,784
Kent Nielsen (Independent)		26	11	52	4	23	16	32	24	20	12	22	49	291
Kenneth Vestergaard (Independent)		10	2	7	0	2	4	4	5	2	2	15	5	58
Valid votes		33,608	15,402	68,642	2,356	30,710	33,045	55,655	43,376	21,372	30,065	25,145	70,546	429,922
Blank votes		491	193	1,041	31	496	565	781	668	317	427	378	982	6,370
Rejected votes – other		125	64	277	11	102	172	207	215	101	122	93	285	1,774
Total polled		34,224	15,659	69,960	2,398	31,308	33,782	56,643	44,259	21,790	30,614	25,616	71,813	438,066
Registered electors		41,587	18,652	85,440	2,654	38,502	40,657	67,645	53,712	26,559	35,999	30,350	84,790	526,547
Turnout		82.29%	83.95%	81.88%	90.35%	81.32%	83.09%	83.74%	82.40%	82.04%	85.04%	84.40%	84.70%	83.20%

The following candidates were elected:

- Constituency seats - Karina Adsbøl (Æ), 3,567 votes; Henrik Dahl (I), 5,779 votes; Benny Engelbrecht (A), 10,657 votes; Søren Espersen (Æ), 4,996 votes; Henrik Frandsen (M), 6,206 votes; Niels Flemming Hansen (C), 2,452 votes; Mette Kierkgaard (M), 2,935 votes; Anders Kronborg (A), 7,407 votes; Karina Lorentzen (F), 5,139 votes; Christian Rabjerg Madsen (A), 7,643 votes; Anni Matthiesen (V), 14,209 votes; Christoffer Aagaard Melson (V), 10,706 votes; Jesper Petersen (A), 8,701 votes; Hans Christian Schmidt (V), 8,046 votes; Kris Jensen Skriver (A), 3,723 votes; Pernille Vermund (D), 15,375 votes; and Birgitte Vind (A), 7,116 votes.
- Compensatory seats - Helena Artmann Andresen (I), 1,143 votes; Peter Kofod (O), 3,887 votes; Kenneth Fredslund Petersen (Æ), 782 votes; Søren Egge Rasmussen (Ø), 1,637 votes; and Lotte Rod (B), 2,714 votes.

==== 2019 ====
Results of the 2019 general election held on 5 June 2019:

Party		Votes per nomination district													Total Votes	%	Seats		
Party		Aaben- raa	Greater Esbjerg	Esbjerg City	Frede- ricia	Hader- slev	Kolding North	Kolding South	Sønder- borg	Tønder	Varde	Vejen	Vejle North	Vejle South	Total Votes	%	Con.	Com.	Tot.
Venstre	V	10,666	10,285	8,360	6,675	9,611	7,491	7,941	12,521	7,318	10,684	13,614	9,559	9,282	124,007	28.51%	6	0	6
Social Democrats	A	8,858	8,913	11,785	9,432	9,357	5,810	7,169	13,470	5,413	6,813	10,356	7,263	9,002	113,641	26.13%	6	0	6
Danish People's Party	O	5,076	3,958	4,173	3,891	4,213	2,616	3,590	5,511	2,889	4,050	5,610	4,550	4,131	54,258	12.48%	3	0	3
Danish Social Liberal Party	B	1,655	1,647	2,283	1,785	1,660	2,354	1,927	2,572	799	1,373	1,800	2,864	2,832	25,551	5.87%	1	0	1
Socialist People's Party	F	1,449	1,768	2,359	1,762	1,614	1,646	1,968	1,897	1,201	1,198	1,511	1,923	2,173	22,469	5.17%	1	0	1
Conservative People's Party	C	1,403	1,825	1,792	1,774	1,534	1,785	1,639	2,049	972	1,343	1,901	2,061	1,971	22,049	5.07%	1	0	1
The New Right	D	1,593	1,375	1,457	1,105	1,786	990	1,294	2,151	999	1,191	1,817	941	1,126	17,825	4.10%	0	1	1
Red–Green Alliance	Ø	1,092	1,364	2,663	1,691	1,495	1,222	1,181	1,440	666	888	1,197	1,268	1,606	17,773	4.09%	0	1	1
Christian Democrats	K	678	585	569	556	852	451	789	574	654	904	1,009	1,034	841	9,496	2.18%	0	0	0
Liberal Alliance	I	525	711	794	617	627	712	833	739	376	789	827	819	941	9,310	2.14%	0	1	1
Hard Line	P	695	574	826	595	663	411	524	918	424	570	653	471	545	7,869	1.81%	0	0	0
The Alternative	Å	401	543	779	588	495	582	620	671	245	380	473	678	717	7,172	1.65%	0	0	0
Klaus Riskær Pedersen	E	226	264	307	302	240	195	210	281	138	245	279	246	282	3,215	0.74%	0	0	0
Michael Thomsen (Independent)		20	17	17	17	24	16	14	84	11	16	20	23	10	289	0.07%	0	0	0
Valid votes		34,337	33,829	38,164	30,790	34,171	26,281	29,699	44,878	22,105	30,444	41,067	33,700	35,459	434,924	100.00%	18	3	21
Blank votes		290	296	387	330	355	206	224	420	236	286	358	272	353	4,013	0.91%			
Rejected votes – other		101	91	139	116	112	88	80	168	103	67	115	65	123	1,368	0.31%			
Total polled		34,728	34,216	38,690	31,236	34,638	26,575	30,003	45,466	22,444	30,797	41,540	34,037	35,935	440,305	83.37%			
Registered electors		42,395	48,247	40,281	38,030	41,541	31,469	35,528	54,724	27,690	36,589	49,567	39,038	43,009	528,108				
Turnout		81.92%	70.92%	96.05%	82.14%	83.38%	84.45%	84.45%	83.08%	81.05%	84.17%	83.81%	87.19%	83.55%	83.37%				

Votes per municipality:

Party		Votes per municipality												Total Votes
Party		Aaben- raa	Bil- lund	Esbjerg	Fanø	Frede- ricia	Hader- slev	Kolding	Sønder- borg	Tønder	Varde	Vejen	Vejle	Total Votes
Venstre	V	10,666	5,565	18,133	512	6,675	9,611	15,432	12,521	7,318	10,684	8,049	18,841	124,007
Social Democrats	A	8,858	3,688	20,123	575	9,432	9,357	12,979	13,470	5,413	6,813	6,668	16,266	113,642
Danish People's Party	O	5,076	2,328	7,930	201	3,891	4,213	6,206	5,511	2,889	4,050	3,282	8,681	54,258
Danish Social Liberal Party	B	1,655	757	3,758	172	1,785	1,660	4,281	2,572	799	1,373	1,043	5,696	25,551
Socialist People's Party	F	1,449	482	3,938	189	1,762	1,614	3,614	1,897	1,201	1,198	1,029	4,096	22,469
Conservative People's Party	C	1,403	603	3,431	186	1,774	1,534	3,424	2,049	972	1,343	1,298	4,032	22,049
The New Right	D	1,593	498	2,797	35	1,105	1,786	2,284	2,151	999	1,191	1,319	2,067	17,825
Red–Green Alliance	Ø	1,092	372	3,786	241	1,691	1,495	2,403	1,440	666	888	825	2,874	17,773
Christian Democrats	K	678	535	1,129	25	556	852	1,240	574	654	904	474	1,875	9,496
Liberal Alliance	I	525	290	1,471	34	617	627	1,545	739	376	789	537	1,760	9,310
Hard Line	P	695	228	1,380	20	595	663	935	918	424	570	425	1,016	7,869
The Alternative	Å	401	167	1,229	93	588	495	1,202	671	245	380	306	1,395	7,172
Klaus Riskær Pedersen	E	226	98	543	28	302	240	405	281	138	245	181	528	3,215
Michael Thomsen (Independent)		20	8	34	0	17	24	30	82	11	16	12	33	287
Valid votes		34,337	15,619	69,682	2,311	30,790	34,171	55,980	44,876	22,105	30,444	25,448	69,160	434,923
Blank votes		290	145	666	17	330	355	430	420	236	286	213	624	4,012
Rejected votes – other		101	40	226	4	116	112	168	170	103	67	75	188	1,370
Total polled		34,728	15,804	70,574	2,332	31,236	34,638	56,578	45,466	22,444	30,797	25,736	69,972	440,305
Registered electors		42,395	18,876	85,893	2,635	38,030	41,541	66,997	54,724	27,690	36,589	30,691	82,047	528,108
Turnout		81.92%	83.73%	82.17%	88.50%	82.14%	83.38%	84.45%	83.08%	81.05%	84.17%	83.86%	85.28%	83.37%

The following candidates were elected:

- Constituency seats - Karina Adsbøl (O), 1,526 votes; Kristian Thulesen Dahl (O), 23,142 votes; Benny Engelbrecht (A), 22,095 votes; Eva Kjer Hansen (V), 17,321 votes; Niels Flemming Hansen (C), 10,234 votes; Marie Krarup (O), 1,618 votes; Anders Kronborg (A), 17,044 votes; Karina Lorentzen (F), 4,698 votes; Christian Rabjerg Madsen (A), 12,940 votes; Anni Matthiesen (V), 17,292 votes; Christoffer Aagaard Melson (V), 13,750 votes; Ellen Trane Nørby (V), 21,997 votes; Jesper Petersen (A), 13,392 votes; Troels Ravn (A), 11,717 votes; Lotte Rod (B), 4,872 votes; Hans Christian Schmidt (V), 17,344 votes; Ulla Tørnæs (V), 12,412 votes; and Birgitte Vind (A), 14,942 votes.
- Compensatory seats - Henrik Dahl (I), 1,737 votes; Henning Hyllested (Ø), 3,813 votes; and Pernille Vermund (D), 13,391 votes.

==== 2015 ====
Results of the 2015 general election held on 18 June 2015:

Party		Votes per nomination district													Total Votes	%	Seats		
Party		Aaben- raa	Greater Esbjerg	Esbjerg City	Frede- ricia	Hader- slev	Kolding North	Kolding South	Sønder- borg	Tønder	Varde	Vejen	Vejle North	Vejle South	Total Votes	%	Con.	Com.	Tot.
Danish People's Party	O	11,392	9,027	10,251	9,312	10,030	6,184	8,177	14,124	6,958	8,996	12,862	9,579	9,166	126,058	28.37%	6	0	6
Venstre	V	8,773	8,960	7,158	5,471	8,465	6,106	6,211	9,994	6,313	10,327	12,143	7,483	7,079	104,483	23.52%	5	0	5
Social Democrats	A	7,857	8,009	10,998	8,755	8,621	5,926	6,734	11,728	5,038	5,907	9,095	7,152	8,571	104,391	23.50%	5	0	5
Liberal Alliance	I	2,503	2,511	2,603	2,077	2,494	2,571	2,442	3,357	1,727	2,103	3,065	2,721	3,103	33,277	7.49%	1	1	2
Red–Green Alliance	Ø	1,608	1,845	3,560	1,911	1,783	1,372	1,354	1,981	1,087	1,153	1,550	1,504	1,906	22,614	5.09%	1	0	1
Danish Social Liberal Party	B	1,175	893	1,107	789	979	1,041	976	1,983	614	753	913	1,288	1,451	13,962	3.14%	0	1	1
Socialist People's Party	F	823	1,134	1,457	1,057	920	1,149	1,216	1,129	560	721	1,029	1,025	1,288	13,508	3.04%	0	0	0
The Alternative	Å	700	853	1,061	965	885	811	898	1,042	488	608	794	1,196	1,250	11,551	2.60%	0	0	0
Conservative People's Party	C	639	787	701	639	788	814	1,003	818	478	510	896	811	741	9,625	2.17%	0	0	0
Christian Democrats	K	354	295	287	256	502	174	395	240	397	467	506	485	434	4,792	1.08%	0	0	0
Valid votes		35,824	34,314	39,183	31,232	35,467	26,148	29,406	46,396	23,660	31,545	42,853	33,244	34,989	444,261	100.00%	18	2	20
Blank votes		274	268	414	299	333	217	241	422	200	275	326	268	321	3,858	0.86%			
Rejected votes – other		134	105	164	83	127	86	116	187	103	109	115	106	132	1,567	0.35%			
Total polled		36,232	34,687	39,761	31,614	35,927	26,451	29,763	47,005	23,963	31,929	43,294	33,618	35,442	449,686	85.56%			
Registered electors		42,572	39,993	48,400	37,395	41,764	31,080	34,625	54,930	28,310	36,750	49,882	37,970	41,938	525,609				
Turnout		85.11%	86.73%	82.15%	84.54%	86.02%	85.11%	85.96%	85.57%	84.65%	86.88%	86.79%	88.54%	84.51%	85.56%				

Votes per municipality:

Party		Votes per municipality												Total Votes
Party		Aaben- raa	Bil- lund	Esbjerg	Fanø	Frede- ricia	Hader- slev	Kolding	Sønder- borg	Tønder	Varde	Vejen	Vejle	Total Votes
Danish People's Party	O	11,392	5,306	18,830	448	9,312	10,030	14,361	14,124	6,958	8,996	7,556	18,745	126,058
Venstre	V	8,773	4,704	15,693	425	5,471	8,465	12,317	9,994	6,313	10,327	7,439	14,562	104,483
Social Democrats	A	7,857	3,172	18,399	608	8,755	8,621	12,660	11,728	5,038	5,907	5,923	15,723	104,391
Liberal Alliance	I	2,503	1,104	4,975	139	2,077	2,494	5,013	3,357	1,727	2,103	1,961	5,824	33,277
Red–Green Alliance	Ø	1,608	522	5,175	230	1,911	1,783	2,726	1,981	1,087	1,153	1,028	3,410	22,614
Danish Social Liberal Party	B	1,175	365	1,929	71	789	979	2,017	1,983	614	753	548	2,739	13,962
Socialist People's Party	F	823	356	2,475	116	1,057	920	2,365	1,129	560	721	673	2,313	13,508
The Alternative	Å	700	282	1,791	123	965	885	1,709	1,042	488	608	512	2,446	11,551
Conservative People's Party	C	639	277	1,411	77	639	788	1,817	818	478	510	619	1,552	9,625
Christian Democrats	K	354	287	575	7	256	502	569	240	397	467	219	919	4,792
Valid votes		35,824	16,375	71,253	2,244	31,232	35,467	55,554	46,396	23,660	31,545	26,478	68,233	444,261
Blank votes		274	100	657	25	299	333	458	422	200	275	226	589	3,858
Rejected votes – other		134	40	265	4	83	127	202	187	103	109	75	238	1,567
Total polled		36,232	16,515	72,175	2,273	31,614	35,927	56,214	47,005	23,963	31,929	26,779	69,060	449,686
Registered electors		42,572	19,047	85,858	2,535	37,395	41,764	65,705	54,930	28,310	36,750	30,835	79,908	525,609
Turnout		85.11%	86.71%	84.06%	89.66%	84.54%	86.02%	85.56%	85.57%	84.65%	86.88%	86.85%	86.42%	85.56%

The following candidates were elected:

- Constituency seats - Karina Adsbøl (O), 4,989 votes; Mette Bock (I), 23,544 votes; Jan Rytkjær Callesen (O), 5,097 votes; Bjarne Corydon (A), 22,277 votes; Kristian Thulesen Dahl (O), 90,724 votes; Susanne Eilersen (O), 3,940 votes; Benny Engelbrecht (A), 14,374 votes; Eva Kjer Hansen (V), 12,342 votes; Carl Holst (V), 18,851 votes; Henning Hyllested (Ø), 5,939 votes; Marie Krarup (O), 4,026 votes; Karen J. Klint (A), 12,340 votes; Christian Rabjerg Madsen (A), 129,955 votes; Anni Matthiesen (V), 11,274 votes; Ellen Trane Nørby (V), 17,179 votes; Jesper Petersen (A), 12,042 votes; Peter Kofod Poulson (O), 5,623 votes; and Hans Christian Schmidt (V), 11,442 votes.
- Compensatory seats - Henrik Dahl (I), 5,991 votes; and Lotte Rod (B), 4,871 votes.

==== 2011 ====
Results of the 2011 general election held on 15 September 2011:

Party		Votes per nomination district													Total Votes	%	Seats		
Party		Aaben- raa	Greater Esbjerg	Esbjerg City	Frede- ricia	Hader- slev	Kolding North	Kolding South	Sønder- borg	Tønder	Varde	Vejen	Vejle North	Vejle South	Total Votes	%	Con.	Com.	Tot.
Venstre	V	13,144	12,952	10,797	8,570	11,973	8,706	8,797	14,770	8,948	13,630	16,862	10,310	9,689	149,148	33.06%	7	0	7
Social Democrats	A	9,088	8,059	11,994	9,753	8,652	5,482	6,373	13,017	5,967	5,985	9,487	6,668	8,412	108,937	24.15%	5	0	5
Danish People's Party	O	5,711	4,498	5,356	4,858	4,949	3,458	4,551	7,329	3,374	4,525	6,642	5,846	5,569	66,666	14.78%	3	1	4
Socialist People's Party	F	2,188	2,623	4,038	2,530	3,004	2,503	2,962	3,374	1,691	1,871	2,587	2,416	2,930	34,717	7.70%	1	1	2
Danish Social Liberal Party	B	2,092	2,308	2,462	1,978	2,206	2,190	2,199	2,790	1,313	1,937	2,425	2,982	2,860	29,742	6.59%	1	1	2
Liberal Alliance	I	1,538	1,699	1,519	1,395	1,810	1,676	1,615	2,077	1,162	1,430	2,197	1,763	2,031	21,912	4.86%	1	0	1
Conservative People's Party	C	1,259	1,134	1,139	1,242	1,340	1,370	1,637	2,416	887	961	1,559	1,481	1,480	17,905	3.97%	0	1	1
Red–Green Alliance	Ø	1,142	1,349	2,619	1,436	1,397	1,163	1,200	1,467	708	878	1,098	1,166	1,643	17,266	3.83%	0	1	1
Christian Democrats	K	367	259	277	281	480	190	358	251	446	551	520	360	374	4,714	1.04%	0	0	0
Jørn Bjorholm (Independent)		7	6	6	5	10	3	10	12	4	2	7	7	4	83	0.02%	0	0	0
Niels-Aage Bjerre (Independent)		4	4	13	5	5	3	3	6	6	1	16	3	2	71	0.02%	0	0	0
Valid votes		36,540	34,891	40,220	32,053	35,826	26,744	29,705	47,509	24,506	31,771	43,400	33,002	34,994	451,161	100.00%	18	5	23
Blank votes		263	208	287	212	273	148	180	337	211	226	323	205	266	3,139	0.69%			
Rejected votes – other		137	126	156	86	109	72	84	182	98	101	123	114	126	1,514	0.33%			
Total polled		36,940	35,225	40,663	32,351	36,208	26,964	29,969	48,028	24,815	32,098	43,846	33,321	35,386	455,814	87.07%			
Registered electors		43,047	39,698	47,943	37,139	41,621	30,648	34,278	55,474	29,046	36,603	50,071	36,996	40,936	523,500				
Turnout		85.81%	88.73%	84.82%	87.11%	86.99%	87.98%	87.43%	86.58%	85.43%	87.69%	87.57%	90.07%	86.44%	87.07%				

Votes per municipality:

Party		Votes per municipality												Total Votes
Party		Aaben- raa	Bil- lund	Esbjerg	Fanø	Frede- ricia	Hader- slev	Kolding	Sønder- borg	Tønder	Varde	Vejen	Vejle	Total Votes
Venstre	V	13,144	6,746	23,083	666	8,570	11,973	17,503	14,770	8,948	13,630	10,116	19,999	149,148
Social Democrats	A	9,088	3,346	19,588	465	9,753	8,652	11,855	13,017	5,967	5,985	6,141	15,080	108,937
Danish People's Party	O	5,711	2,846	9,562	292	4,858	4,949	8,009	7,329	3,374	4,525	3,796	11,415	66,666
Socialist People's Party	F	2,188	829	6,424	237	2,530	3,004	5,465	3,374	1,691	1,871	1,758	5,346	34,717
Danish Social Liberal Party	B	2,092	854	4,579	191	1,978	2,206	4,389	2,790	1,313	1,937	1,571	5,842	29,742
Liberal Alliance	I	1,538	741	3,109	109	1,395	1,810	3,291	2,077	1,162	1,430	1,456	3,794	21,912
Conservative People's Party	C	1,259	524	2,179	94	1,242	1,340	3,007	2,416	887	961	1,035	2,961	17,905
Red–Green Alliance	Ø	1,142	386	3,796	172	1,436	1,397	2,363	1,467	708	878	712	2,809	17,266
Christian Democrats	K	367	317	528	8	281	480	548	251	446	551	203	734	4,714
Jørn Bjorholm (Independent)		7	5	12	0	5	10	13	12	4	2	2	11	83
Niels-Aage Bjerre (Independent)		4	3	14	3	5	5	6	6	6	1	13	5	71
Valid votes		36,540	16,597	72,874	2,237	32,053	35,826	56,449	47,509	24,506	31,771	26,803	67,996	451,161
Blank votes		263	112	479	16	212	273	328	337	211	226	211	471	3,139
Rejected votes – other		137	50	274	8	86	109	156	182	98	101	73	240	1,514
Total polled		36,940	16,759	73,627	2,261	32,351	36,208	56,933	48,028	24,815	32,098	27,087	68,707	455,814
Registered electors		43,047	19,082	85,155	2,486	37,139	41,621	64,926	55,474	29,046	36,603	30,989	77,932	523,500
Turnout		85.81%	87.83%	86.46%	90.95%	87.11%	86.99%	87.69%	86.58%	85.43%	87.69%	87.41%	88.16%	87.07%

The following candidates were elected:

- Constituency seats - Karina Adsbøl (O), 2,993 votes; Jacob Bjerregaard (A), 12,916 votes; Mette Bock (I), 16,751 votes; Peter Christensen (V), 19,563 votes; Bjarne Corydon (A), 15,980 votes; Kristian Thulesen Dahl (O), 45,096 votes; Jørn Dohrmann (O), 6,387 votes; Benny Engelbrecht (A), 14,137 votes; Eva Kjer Hansen (V), 20,346 votes; Karen J. Klint (A), 10,351 votes; Karina Lorentzen Dehnhardt (F), 7,912 votes; Anni Matthiesen (V), 10,537 votes; Ellen Trane Nørby (V), 27,793 votes; Troels Ravn (A), 9,108 votes; Lotte Rod (B), 11,196 votes; Hans Christian Schmidt (V), 17,470 votes; Hans Christian Thoning (V), 12,240 votes; and Ulla Tørnæs (V), 15,123 votes.
- Compensatory seats - Henning Hyllested (Ø), 3,487 votes; Marie Krarup (O), 2,900 votes; Mike Legarth (C), 5,145 votes; Marlene B. Lorentzen (B), 6,190 votes; and Jesper Petersen (F), 6,071 votes.

==== 2007 ====
Results of the 2007 general election held on 13 November 2007:

Party		Votes per nomination district													Total Votes	%	Seats		
Party		Aaben- raa	Greater Esbjerg	Esbjerg City	Frede- ricia	Hader- slev	Kolding North	Kolding South	Sønder- borg	Tønder	Varde	Vejen	Vejle North	Vejle South	Total Votes	%	Con.	Com.	Tot.
Venstre	V	13,637	12,832	10,322	8,350	12,798	8,327	8,637	16,128	9,733	14,405	17,310	11,292	9,917	153,688	34.60%	7	1	8
Social Democrats	A	8,395	7,919	12,241	8,234	8,319	4,838	5,769	12,353	5,443	5,765	8,647	6,027	7,607	101,557	22.86%	5	0	5
Danish People's Party	O	6,282	4,681	6,136	5,082	5,654	3,582	4,559	8,746	3,799	4,410	6,553	4,970	5,308	69,762	15.71%	3	1	4
Socialist People's Party	F	3,101	3,652	5,780	4,291	4,044	4,115	4,647	4,572	2,196	2,401	3,658	3,501	4,526	50,484	11.37%	2	1	3
Conservative People's Party	C	3,037	2,583	2,637	2,868	2,568	2,931	3,142	3,442	1,913	2,261	3,353	3,153	3,167	37,055	8.34%	1	1	2
Danish Social Liberal Party	B	1,081	1,169	1,114	961	1,025	1,155	1,112	1,464	736	1,106	1,324	1,486	1,468	15,201	3.42%	0	1	1
New Alliance	Y	594	542	691	614	679	619	549	870	388	482	795	798	860	8,481	1.91%	0	1	1
Christian Democrats	K	307	226	274	279	418	207	305	250	332	421	501	388	417	4,325	0.97%	0	0	0
Unity List	Ø	236	269	505	272	251	234	250	347	166	171	216	326	383	3,626	0.82%	0	0	0
Valid votes		36,670	33,873	39,700	30,951	35,756	26,008	28,970	48,172	24,706	31,422	42,357	31,941	33,653	444,179	100.00%	18	6	24
Blank votes		162	199	202	147	190	96	116	242	142	161	260	145	155	2,217	0.50%			
Rejected votes – other		117	99	124	89	104	63	66	138	71	57	116	86	131	1,261	0.28%			
Total polled		36,949	34,171	40,026	31,187	36,050	26,167	29,152	48,552	24,919	31,640	42,733	32,172	33,939	447,657	85.90%			
Registered electors		43,224	38,929	47,932	36,798	41,894	30,248	33,920	56,020	29,598	36,390	49,735	36,371	40,078	521,137				
Turnout		85.48%	87.78%	83.51%	84.75%	86.05%	86.51%	85.94%	86.67%	84.19%	86.95%	85.92%	88.46%	84.68%	85.90%				

Votes per municipality:

Party		Votes per municipality												Total Votes
Party		Aaben- raa	Bil- lund	Esbjerg	Fanø	Frede- ricia	Hader- slev	Kolding	Sønder- borg	Tønder	Varde	Vejen	Vejle	Total Votes
Venstre	V	13,637	6,916	22,537	617	8,350	12,798	16,964	16,128	9,733	14,405	10,394	21,209	153,688
Social Democrats	A	8,395	3,013	19,645	515	8,234	8,319	10,607	12,353	5,443	5,765	5,634	13,634	101,557
Danish People's Party	O	6,282	2,630	10,507	310	5,082	5,654	8,141	8,746	3,799	4,410	3,923	10,278	69,762
Socialist People's Party	F	3,101	1,265	9,055	377	4,291	4,044	8,762	4,572	2,196	2,401	2,393	8,027	50,484
Conservative People's Party	C	3,037	1,252	5,035	185	2,868	2,568	6,073	3,442	1,913	2,261	2,101	6,320	37,055
Danish Social Liberal Party	B	1,081	474	2,191	92	961	1,025	2,267	1,464	736	1,106	850	2,954	15,201
New Alliance	Y	594	302	1,175	58	614	679	1,168	870	388	482	493	1,658	8,481
Christian Democrats	K	307	307	487	13	279	418	512	250	332	421	194	805	4,325
Unity List	Ø	236	79	728	46	272	251	484	347	166	171	137	709	3,626
Valid votes		36,670	16,238	71,360	2,213	30,951	35,756	54,978	48,172	24,706	31,422	26,119	65,594	444,179
Blank votes		162	83	385	16	147	190	212	242	142	161	177	300	2,217
Rejected votes – other		117	52	216	7	89	104	129	138	71	57	64	217	1,261
Total polled		36,949	16,373	71,961	2,236	31,187	36,050	55,319	48,552	24,919	31,640	26,360	66,111	447,657
Registered electors		43,224	19,003	84,396	2,465	36,798	41,894	64,168	56,020	29,598	36,390	30,732	76,449	521,137
Turnout		85.48%	86.16%	85.27%	90.71%	84.75%	86.05%	86.21%	86.67%	84.19%	86.95%	85.77%	86.48%	85.90%

The following candidates were elected:

- Constituency seats - Mogens Camre (O), 7,276 votes; Carina Christensen (C), 13,833 votes; Jørn Dohrmann (O), 22,490 votes; Benny Engelbrecht (A), 11,645 votes; Eva Kjer Hansen (V), 30,909 votes; Karen J. Klint (A), 12,422 votes; Søren Krarup (O), 14,159 votes; Kim Mortensen (A), 16,109 votes; Ellen Trane Nørby (V), 19,484 votes; Jesper Petersen (F), 3,076 votes; Julie Rademacher (A), 10,514 votes; Preben Rudiengaard (V), 15,079 votes; Hans Christian Schmidt (V), 15,905 votes; Lise von Seelen (A), 9,361 votes; Villy Søvndal (F), 33,733 votes; Hans Christian Thoning (V), 11,613 votes; Ulla Tørnæs (V), 11,801 votes; and Jens Vibjerg (V), 11,252 votes.
- Compensatory seats - Peter Christensen (V), 10,841 votes; Bente Dahl (B), 3,363 votes; Mike Legarth (C), 4,411 votes; Karina Lorentzen (F), 1,251 votes; Karin Nødgaard (O), 5,765 votes; and Jørgen Poulsen (Y), 5,459 votes.
