= Lotte Rod =

Danish politician (born 1985)

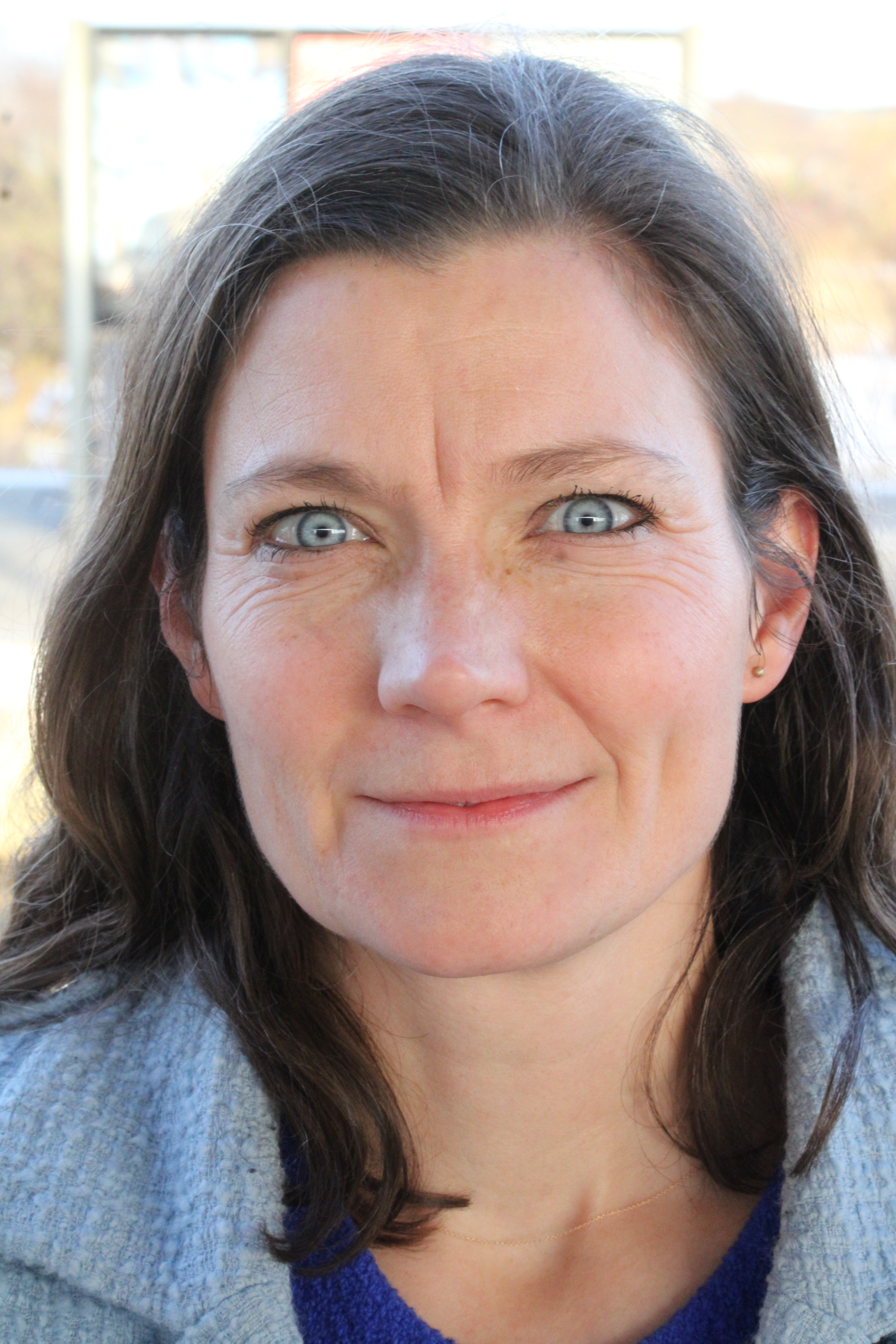
- Rod in 2026

Member of the Folketing
- Incumbent
- Assumed office 15 September 2011
- Constituency: South Jutland

Personal details
- Born: 10 June 1985 (age 40) Aarhus, Denmark
- Party: Social Liberal Party

Lotte Rod (born 10 June 1985) is a Danish politician, who is a member of the Folketing for the Social Liberal Party. She was elected into parliament at the 2011 Danish general election.

== Political career ==
Rod was first elected into parliament at the 2011 election, and was reelected in 2015 and 2019. In 2020 it was revealed that leader of the Social Liberal Party Morten Østergaard had sexually harassed Rod. This case eventually led to Østergaard resigning as party leader and later also resigning his seat in parliament.
