= Anders Kronborg =

Danish politician

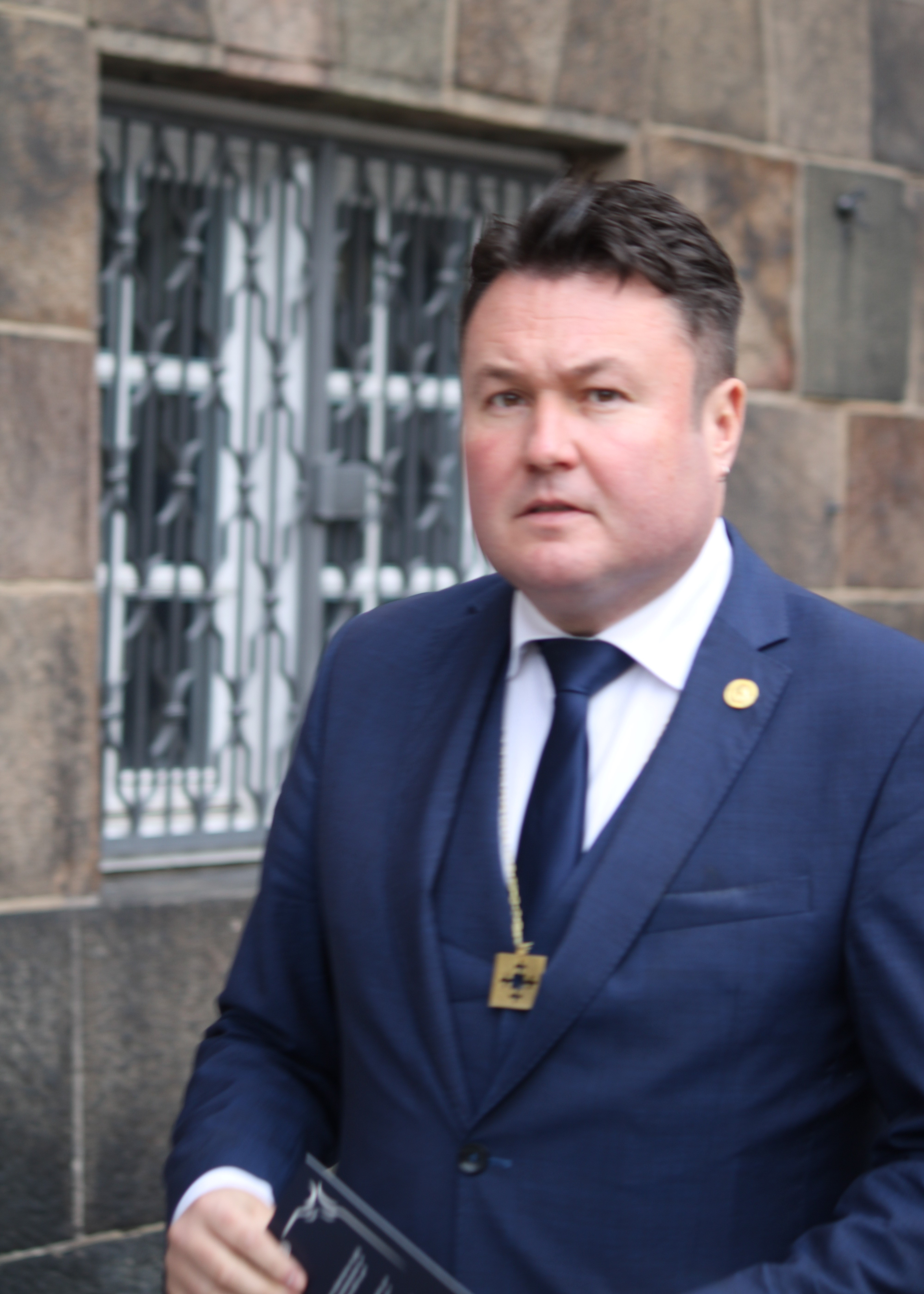
- Kronborg in 2025

Member of the Folketing
- Incumbent
- Assumed office 5 June 2019
- Constituency: South Jutland

Personal details
- Born: 18 March 1982 (age 44) Esbjerg, Denmark
- Party: Social Democrats

Anders Kronborg (born 18 March 1982) is a Danish politician, who is a member of the Folketing for the Social Democrats political party. He was elected into parliament in the 2019 Danish general election.

== Political career ==
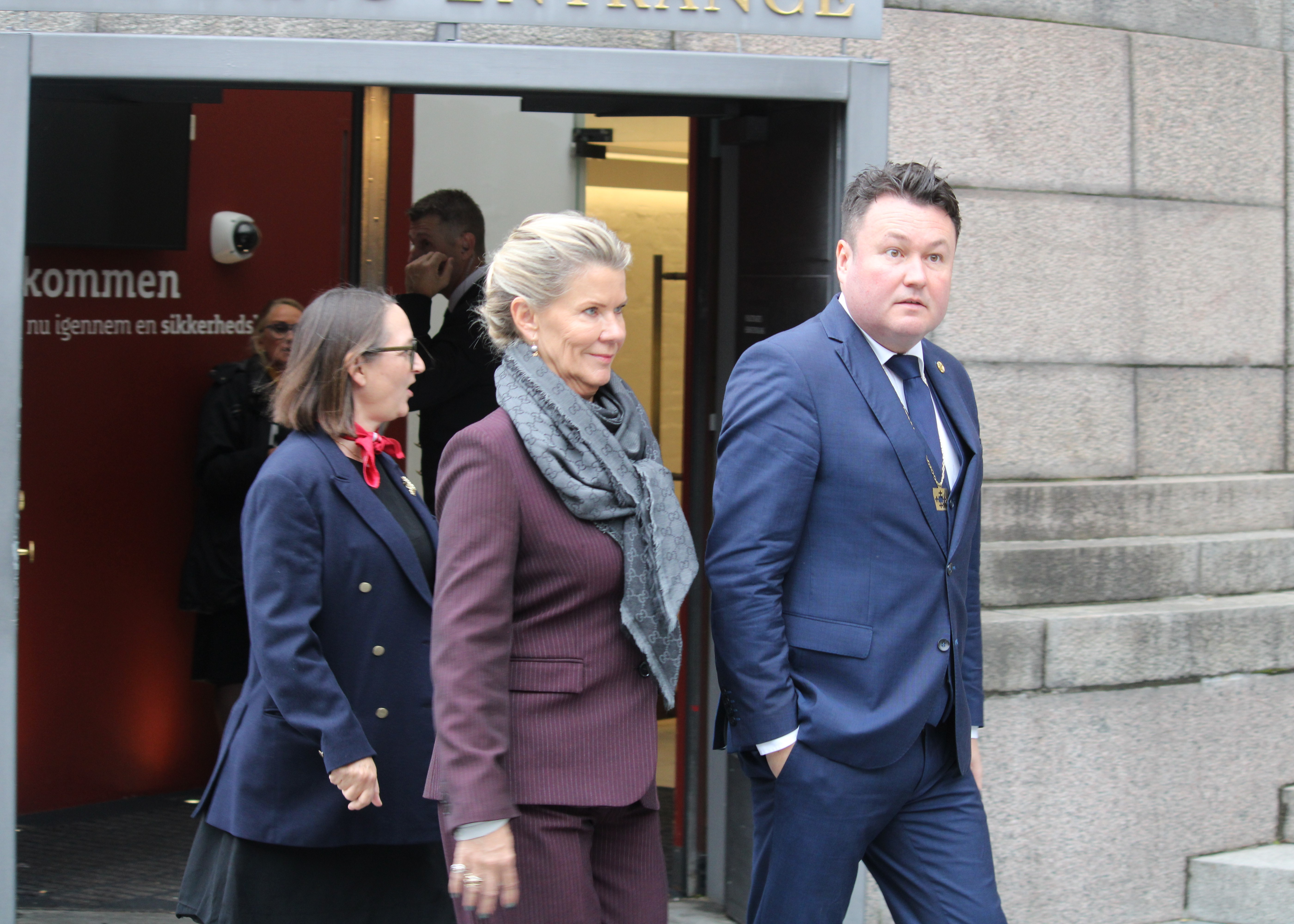
Kronborg with Mette Reissmann at the 2025 opening of parliament

Kronborg sat in the municipal council of Esbjerg Municipality from 2005 to 2017. He was elected into parliament in the 2019 election, where he received 8,607 personal votes.
