= Kolding South (nomination district) =

Nomination district in Denmark

- Kolding Syd
- Nomination district constituency for the Folketing
- Location of Kolding Syd within South Jutland

- Location of South Jutland within Denmark
- Municipalities: Kolding
- Constituency: South Jutland
- Electorate: 35,952 (2022)

Current constituency
- Created: 2007

Kolding South nominating district is one of the 92 nominating districts that was created for Danish elections following the 2007 municipal reform. It is one of the two nomination districts in Kolding Municipality, the other being Kolding North.

In general elections, the district is a strong area for parties commonly associated with the blue bloc.

== General elections results ==
=== General elections in the 2020s ===
2022 Danish general election

Parties	Vote		
Parties	Votes	%	+ / -
Social Democrats	7,931	26.79	+2.65
Venstre	4,269	14.42	-12.32
Denmark Democrats	3,033	10.25	New
Moderates	2,834	9.57	New
Liberal Alliance	2,632	8.89	+6.09
Green Left	2,183	7.37	+0.74
New Right	1,763	5.96	+1.60
Conservatives	1,561	5.27	-0.25
Danish People's Party	915	3.09	-9.00
Social Liberals	902	3.05	-3.44
Red–Green Alliance	752	2.54	-1.44
The Alternative	475	1.60	-0.49
Christian Democrats	252	0.85	-1.81
Independent Greens	85	0.29	New
Kent Nielsen	13	0.04	New
Kenneth Vestergaard	1	0.00	New
Total	29,601		

=== General elections in the 2010s ===
2019 Danish general election

Parties	Vote		
Parties	Votes	%	+ / -
Venstre	7,941	26.74	+5.62
Social Democrats	7,169	24.14	+1.24
Danish People's Party	3,590	12.09	-15.72
Green Left	1,968	6.63	+2.49
Social Liberals	1,927	6.49	+3.17
Conservatives	1,639	5.52	+2.11
New Right	1,294	4.36	New
Red–Green Alliance	1,181	3.98	-0.62
Liberal Alliance	833	2.80	-5.50
Christian Democrats	789	2.66	+1.32
The Alternative	620	2.09	-0.96
Stram Kurs	524	1.76	New
Klaus Riskær Pedersen Party	210	0.71	New
Michael Thomsen	14	0.05	New
Total	29,699		

2015 Danish general election

Parties	Vote		
Parties	Votes	%	+ / -
Danish People's Party	8,177	27.81	+12.49
Social Democrats	6,734	22.90	+1.45
Venstre	6,211	21.12	-8.49
Liberal Alliance	2,442	8.30	+2.86
Red–Green Alliance	1,354	4.60	+0.56
Green Left	1,216	4.14	-5.83
Conservatives	1,003	3.41	-2.10
Social Liberals	976	3.32	-4.08
The Alternative	898	3.05	New
Christian Democrats	395	1.34	+0.13
Total	29,406		

2011 Danish general election

Parties	Vote		
Parties	Votes	%	+ / -
Venstre	8,797	29.61	-0.20
Social Democrats	6,373	21.45	+1.54
Danish People's Party	4,551	15.32	-0.42
Green Left	2,962	9.97	-6.07
Social Liberals	2,199	7.40	+3.56
Conservatives	1,637	5.51	-5.34
Liberal Alliance	1,615	5.44	+3.54
Red–Green Alliance	1,200	4.04	+3.18
Christian Democrats	358	1.21	+0.16
Jørn Bjorholm	10	0.03	New
Niesl-Aage Bjerre	3	0.01	New
Total	29,705		

=== General elections in the 2000s ===
2007 Danish general election

Parties	Vote		
Parties	Votes	%	+ / -
Venstre	8,637	29.81	
Social Democrats	5,769	19.91	
Green Left	4,647	16.04	
Danish People's Party	4,559	15.74	
Conservatives	3,142	10.85	
Social Liberals	1,112	3.84	
New Alliance	549	1.90	
Christian Democrats	305	1.05	
Red–Green Alliance	250	0.86	
Total	28,970		

== European Parliament elections results ==
2024 European Parliament election in Denmark

Parties	Vote		
Parties	Votes	%	+ / -
Venstre	4,118	20.58	-7.01
Social Democrats	3,013	15.06	-5.71
Green Left	2,914	14.56	+4.69
Conservatives	1,869	9.34	+3.94
Liberal Alliance	1,677	8.38	+5.06
Denmark Democrats	1,670	8.35	New
Danish People's Party	1,548	7.74	-7.68
Social Liberals	1,130	5.65	-2.27
Moderates	983	4.91	New
Red–Green Alliance	715	3.57	+0.15
The Alternative	374	1.87	-0.73
Total	20,011		

2019 European Parliament election in Denmark

Parties	Vote		
Parties	Votes	%	+ / -
Venstre	6,287	27.59	+6.61
Social Democrats	4,733	20.77	+4.19
Danish People's Party	3,514	15.42	-15.89
Green Left	2,248	9.87	+1.95
Social Liberals	1,804	7.92	+3.13
Conservatives	1,230	5.40	-4.19
People's Movement against the EU	841	3.69	-2.18
Red–Green Alliance	780	3.42	New
Liberal Alliance	757	3.32	+0.36
The Alternative	592	2.60	New
Total	22,786		

2014 European Parliament election in Denmark

Parties	Vote		
Parties	Votes	%	+ / -
Danish People's Party	5,824	31.31	+14.28
Venstre	3,903	20.98	-2.11
Social Democrats	3,085	16.58	-2.50
Conservatives	1,785	9.59	-5.26
Green Left	1,473	7.92	-7.41
People's Movement against the EU	1,092	5.87	+0.56
Social Liberals	892	4.79	+1.82
Liberal Alliance	550	2.96	+2.47
Total	18,604		

2009 European Parliament election in Denmark

Parties	Vote		
Parties	Votes	%	+ / -
Venstre	4,364	23.09	
Social Democrats	3,606	19.08	
Danish People's Party	3,219	17.03	
Green Left	2,897	15.33	
Conservatives	2,807	14.85	
People's Movement against the EU	1,004	5.31	
Social Liberals	562	2.97	
June Movement	346	1.83	
Liberal Alliance	92	0.49	
Total	18,897		

== Referendums ==
2022 Danish European Union opt-out referendum

Option	Votes	%
✓ YES	14,738	63.42
X NO	8,502	36.58

2015 Danish European Union opt-out referendum

Option	Votes	%
X NO	13,792	56.31
✓ YES	10,702	43.69

2014 Danish Unified Patent Court membership referendum

Option	Votes	%
✓ YES	11,184	61.29
X NO	7,063	38.71

2009 Danish Act of Succession referendum

Option	Votes	%
✓ YES	15,439	86.29
X NO	2,454	13.71
