= Frida Vyff Bruun =

Danish politician (born 1988)

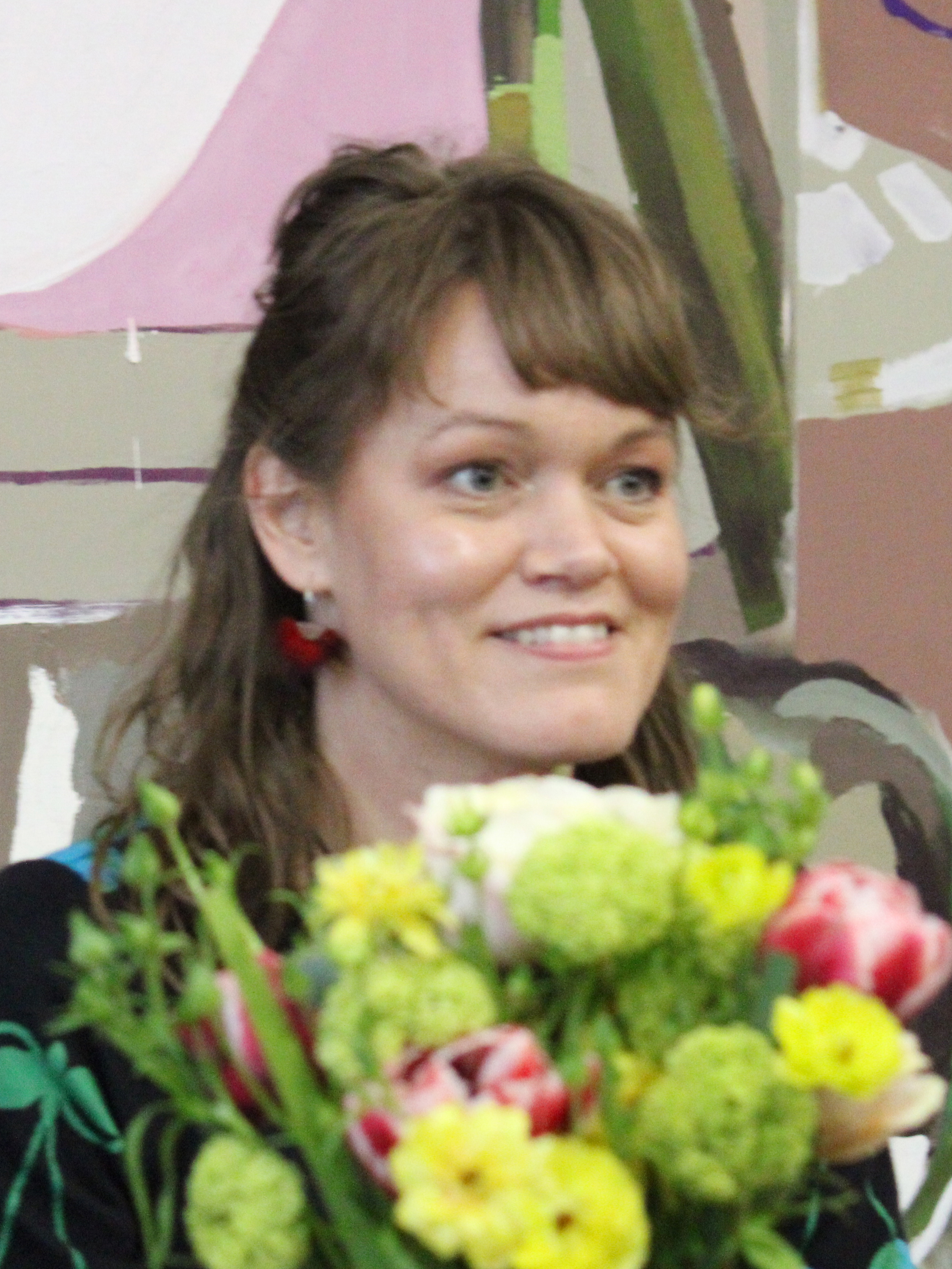
- Bruun in 2026

Member of the Folketing
- Incumbent
- Assumed office 24 March 2026
- Constituency: South Jutland

Personal details
- Born: 1988 (age 37–38)
- Party: Moderates

Frida Vyff Bruun (born 1988) is a Danish politician who was elected member of the Folketing in 2026. She previously worked at the Færdselsstyrelsen and served in the Royal Danish Navy.

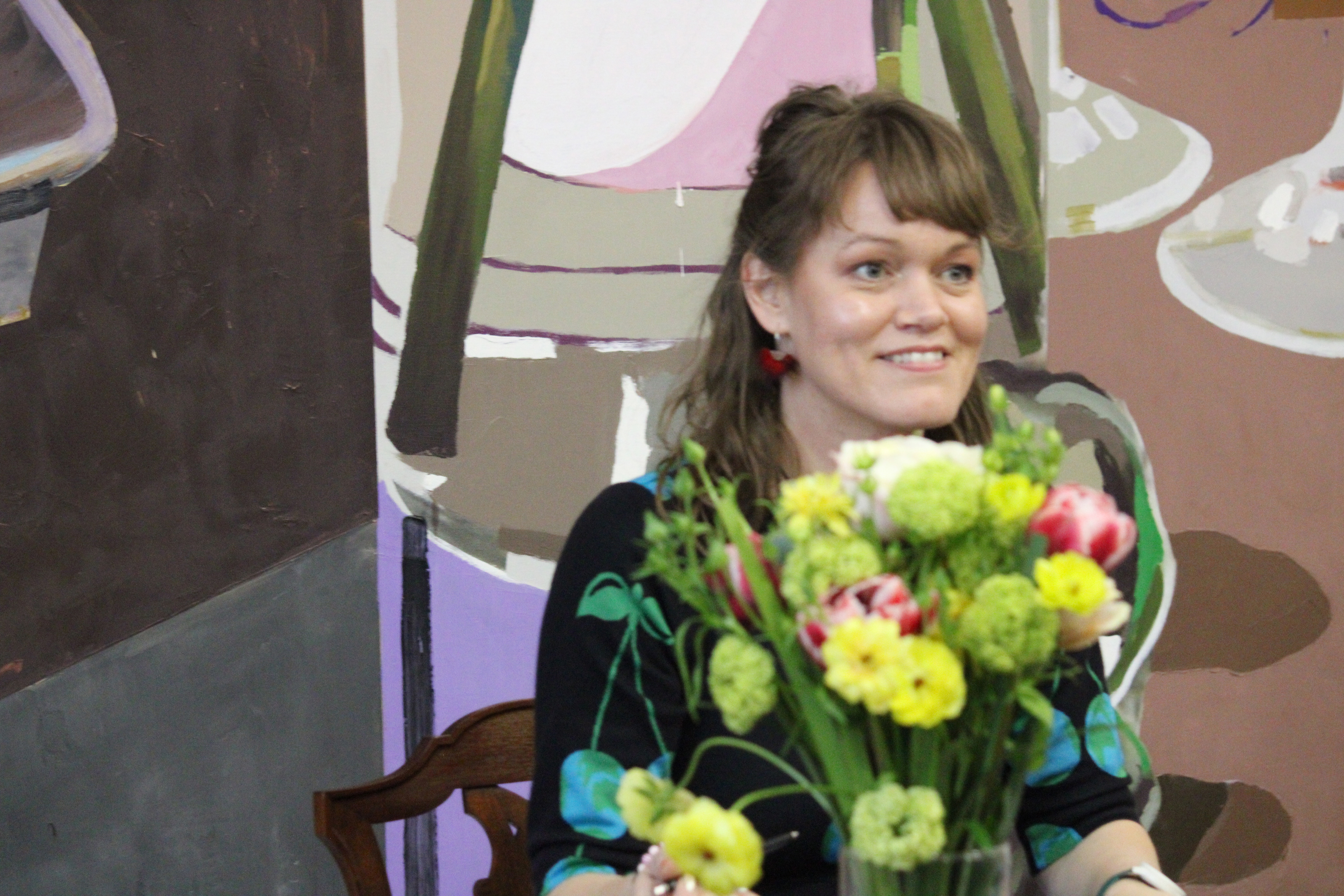
Bruun signing a pledge to uphold the Danish Constitution at Christiansborg, 14 April 2026
