= Karina Lorentzen =

Danish politician (born 1973)

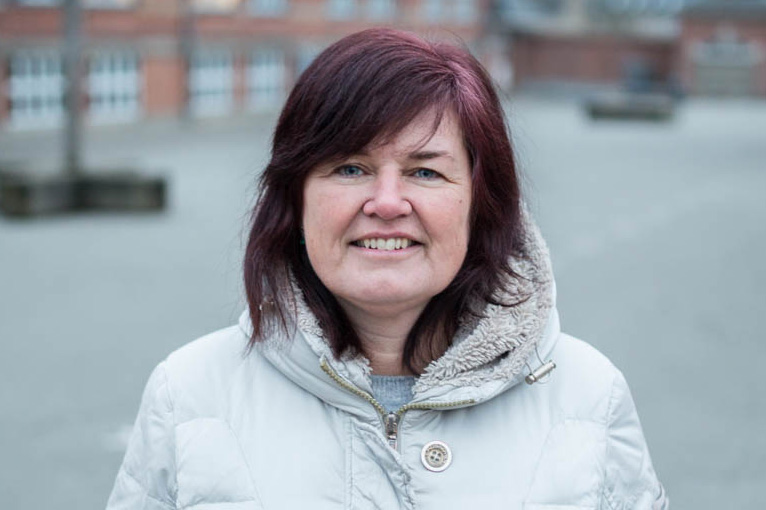
- Lorentzen in 2018

Member of the Folketing
- Incumbent
- Assumed office 5 June 2019; 13 November 2007 – 18 June 2015
- Constituency: South Jutland

Personal details
- Born: 26 October 1973 (age 52) Kolding, Denmark
- Party: Socialist People's Party

Karina Lorentzen Dehnhardt (born 26 October 1973) is a Danish politician, who is a member of the Folketing for the Socialist People's Party. She was elected into parliament at the 2007 and 2011 general elections, lost her seat in 2015 and was again elected in 2019.

== Political career ==
Lorentzen first ran for parliament in the 2007 Danish general election, where she was elected with 1,251 personal votes. She was then reelected in 2011 with 4,877 votes. In 2015 she received 3,169 and did not get reelected. But in 2019 she was elected and receiving 4,698 votes.
