= Christoffer Aagaard Melson =

Danish politician (born 1984)

Member of the Folketing
- Incumbent
- Assumed office 5 June 2019
- Constituency: South Jutland

Personal details
- Born: 16 August 1984 (age 42) Vejle, Denmark
- Party: Venstre

Christoffer Aagaard Melson (born 16 August 1984) is a Danish politician, who is a member of the Folketing for the Venstre political party. He was elected into parliament at the 2019 Danish general election.

== Political career ==
Melson was a member of the municipal council of Vejle Municipality from 2014 to 2021. He was elected into the Folketing in 2019, receiving 7,550 personal votes.
