= Kenneth Fredslund Petersen =

Danish politician (born 1965)

Member of the Folketing
- Incumbent
- Assumed office 1 November 2022
- Constituency: South Jutland

Personal details
- Born: 1965 (age 60–61) Rødding, South Jutland Denmark
- Party: Denmark Democrats (2022-)
- Other political affiliations: Danish People's Party (2017-2022)

Kenneth Fredslund Petersen (born 1965) is a Danish politician who is a member of the Folketing for the Denmark Democrats. He has represented the West Jutland constituency since 2022.

== Biography ==
Petersen born and raised in Rødding in Southern Jutland. After leaving school he worked in various jobs, including as an export driver, a dock worker, casting blades for wind turbines before founding an independent business in 2001. Petersen first entered politics when he was elected to the municipal council of Vejle municipality in 2017 for the Danish People's Party. He has also been a board member of Vejle port authority.

In 2022, he joined the Denmark Democrats party and was elected to the Folketing (Danish Parliament) during the 2022 Danish general election for the South Jutland constituency.
