= Anni Matthiesen =

Danish politician (born 1964)

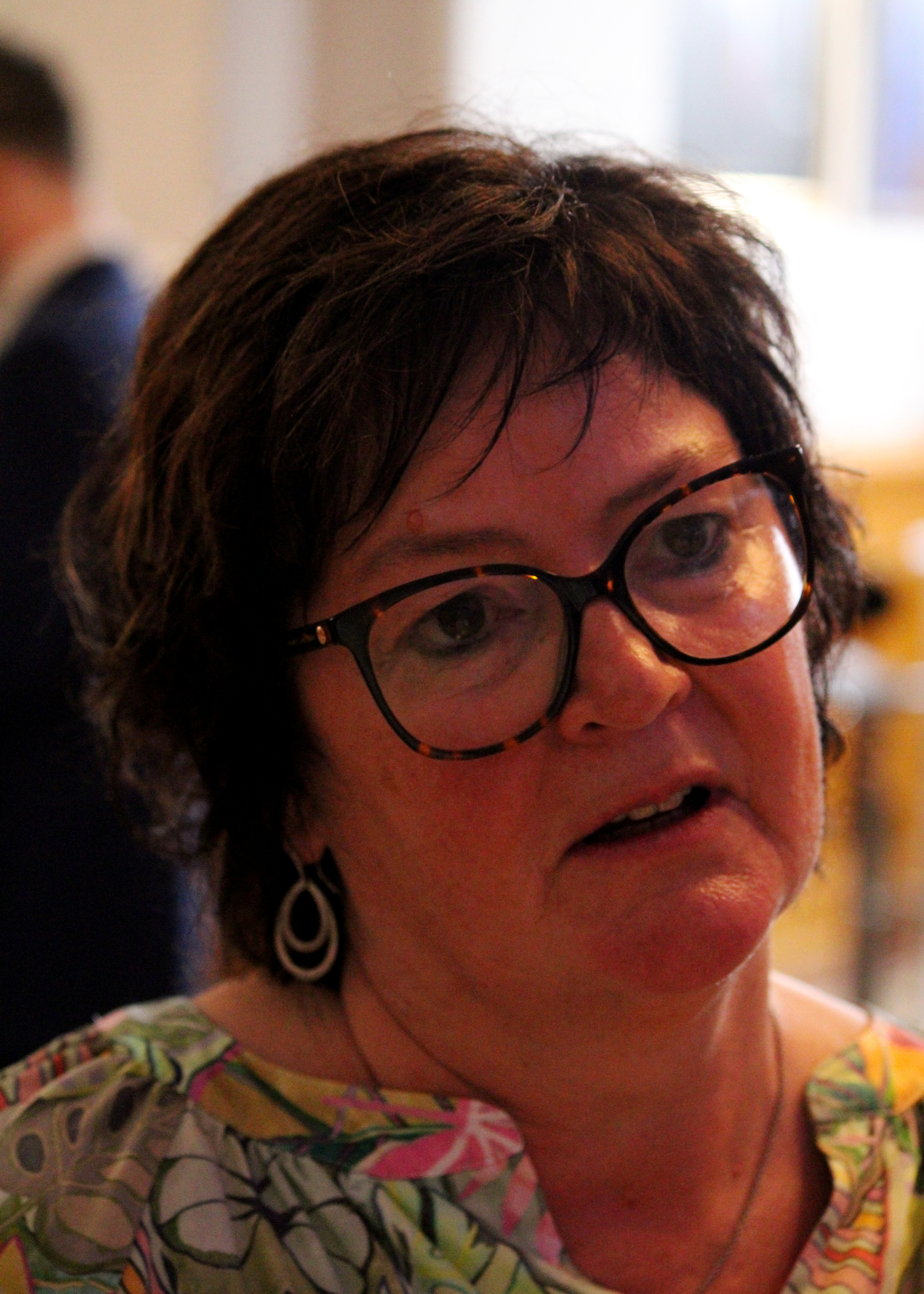
- Matthiesen in 2026

Member of the Folketing
- Incumbent
- Assumed office 15 September 2011
- Constituency: South Jutland

Personal details
- Born: 8 February 1964 (age 62) Faaborg, Denmark
- Party: Venstre

Anni Holm Kirkegaard Matthiesen (born 8 February 1964) is a Danish politician, who is a member of the Folketing for the Venstre political party. She was elected into parliament at the 2011 Danish general election.

== Political career ==
Matthiesen was first elected into parliament at the 2011 election, where she received 7,017 personal votes. She was reelected in 2015 election with 8,197 votes and in 2019 with 11,308 votes.
