= Jan Rytkjær Callesen =

Danish politician

Member of the Folketing
- In office 18 June 2015 – 5 June 2019
- Constituency: South Jutland

Personal details
- Born: 2 May 1963 (age 62) Sønderborg, Denmark
- Party: Danish People's Party

Jan Rytkjær Callesen (born 2 May 1963 in Sønderborg) is a Danish politician, who was a member of the Folketing for the Danish People's Party from 2015 to 2019.

== Political career ==
Calleen has been a member of Sønderborg Municipality's municipal council since 2010. He was elected into parliament at the 2015 Danish general election, where he received 2,972 votes. In the 2019 election he received 1,056 votes and did not get reelected.
