= Helena Andresen =

Danish politician (born 2001)

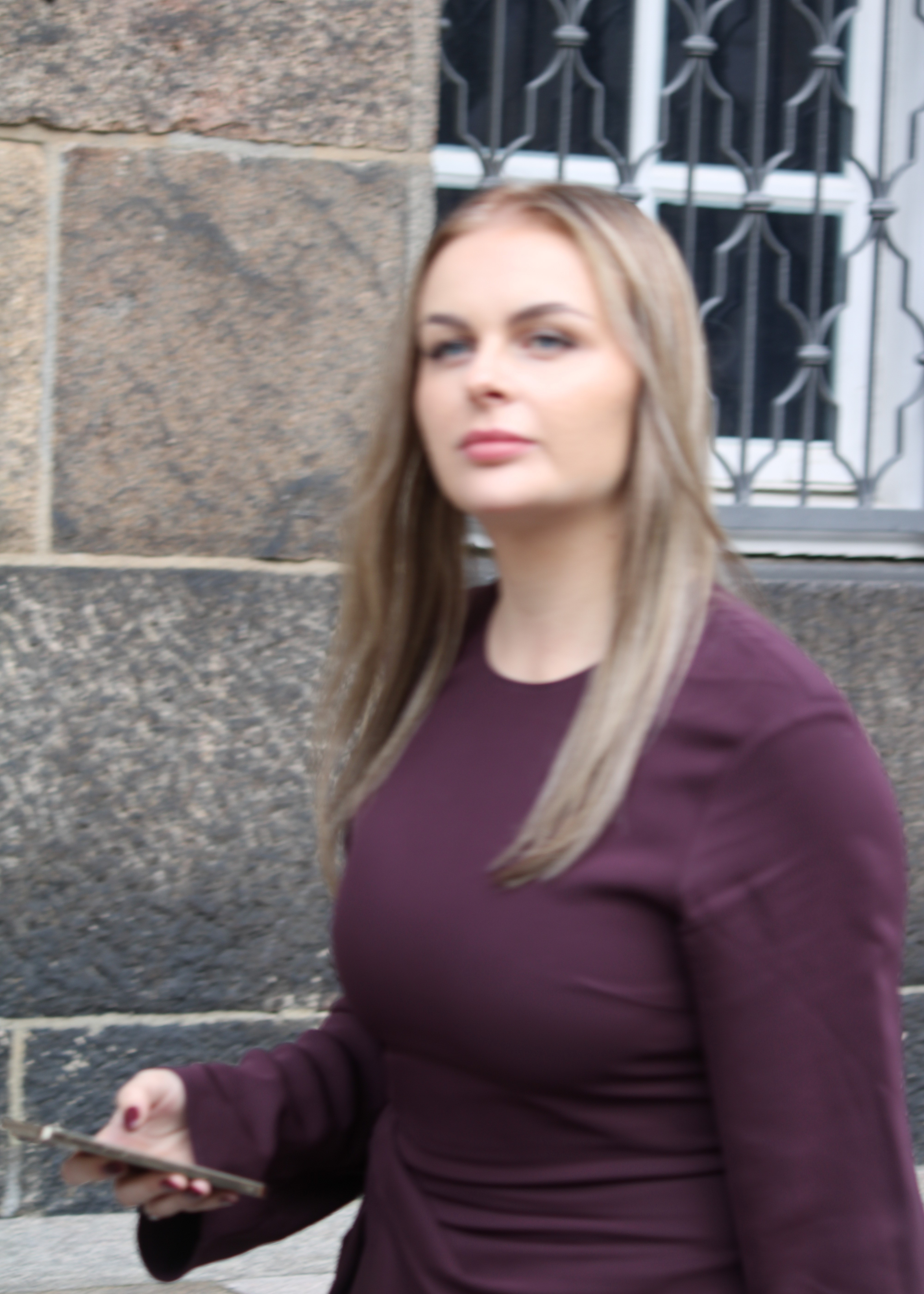
- Helena Andresen in 2025

Member of the Folketing
- Incumbent
- Assumed office 2022
- Constituency: South Jutland

Personal details
- Born: 26 September 2001 (age 24) Kolding, Denmark
- Party: Liberal Alliance

Helena Artmann Andresen (born 26 September 2001) is a Danish politician. She was elected a member of parliament for the Liberal Alliance in the 2022 Danish general election.

Prior to getting elected an MP, she worked as a Sales Assistant in Partyland in Kolding, where she lives.

== See also ==
- List of members of the Folketing, 2022–present
