= Frederik Bloch Münster =

Danish politician (born 1994)

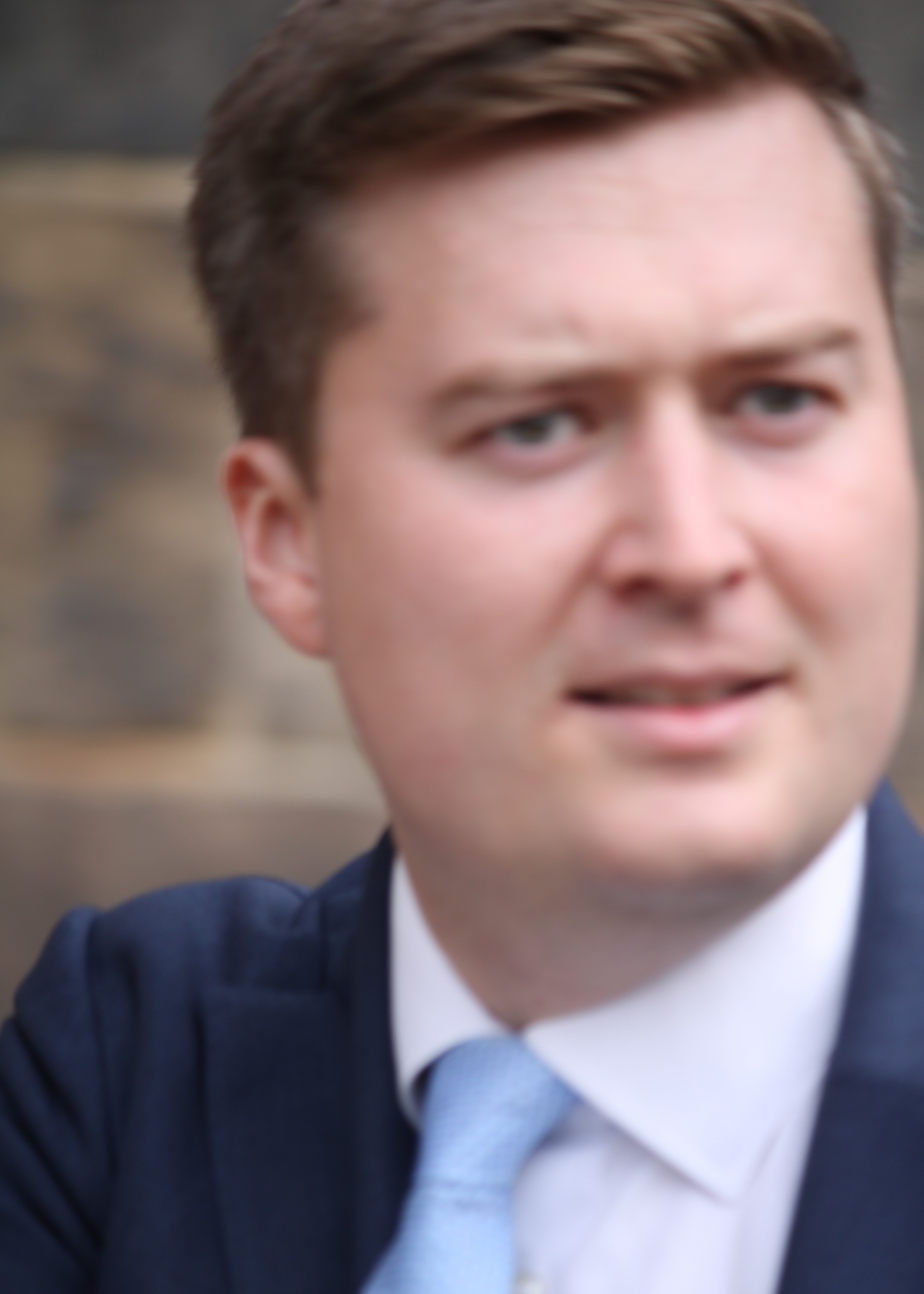
- Münster in 2026

Member of the Folketing
- Incumbent
- Assumed office 26 June 2024
- Preceded by: Niels Flemming Hansen
- Constituency: South Jutland

Personal details
- Born: 3 November 1994 (age 31)
- Party: Conservative People's Party

Frederik Bloch Münster (born 3 November 1994) is a Danish politician serving as a member of the Folketing since 2024. He has served as spokesperson of the Conservative People's Party since 2024.
