= Birgitte Vind =

Danish politician (born 1965)

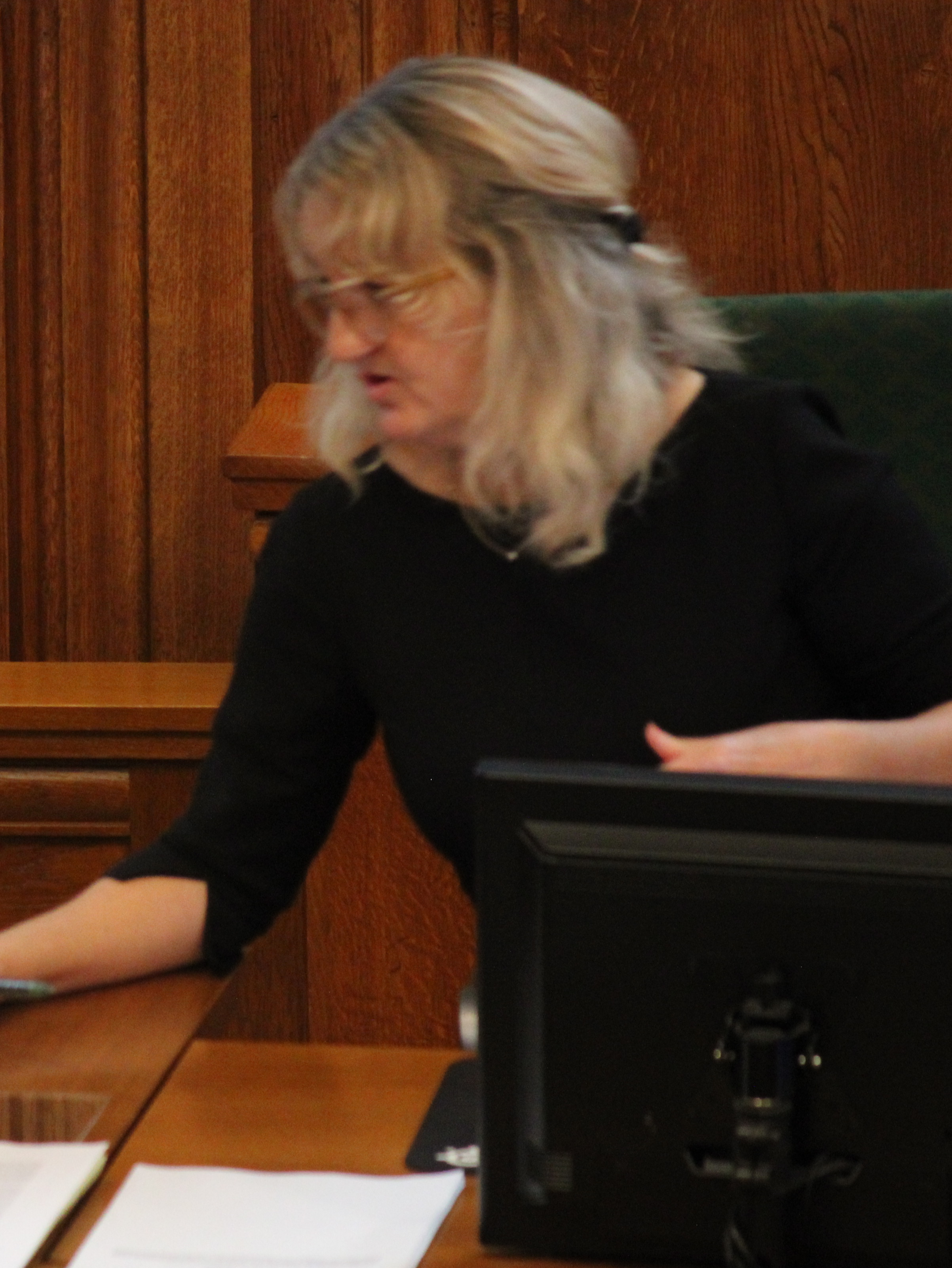
- Vind in 2025

Member of the Folketing
- Incumbent
- Assumed office 5 June 2019
- Constituency: South Jutland

Personal details
- Born: 13 August 1965 (age 61) Vejle, Denmark
- Party: Social Democrats

Birgitte Vind (born 13 August 1965) is a Danish politician, who is a member of the Folketing for the Social Democrats political party. She was elected into parliament at the 2019 Danish general election.

== Political career ==
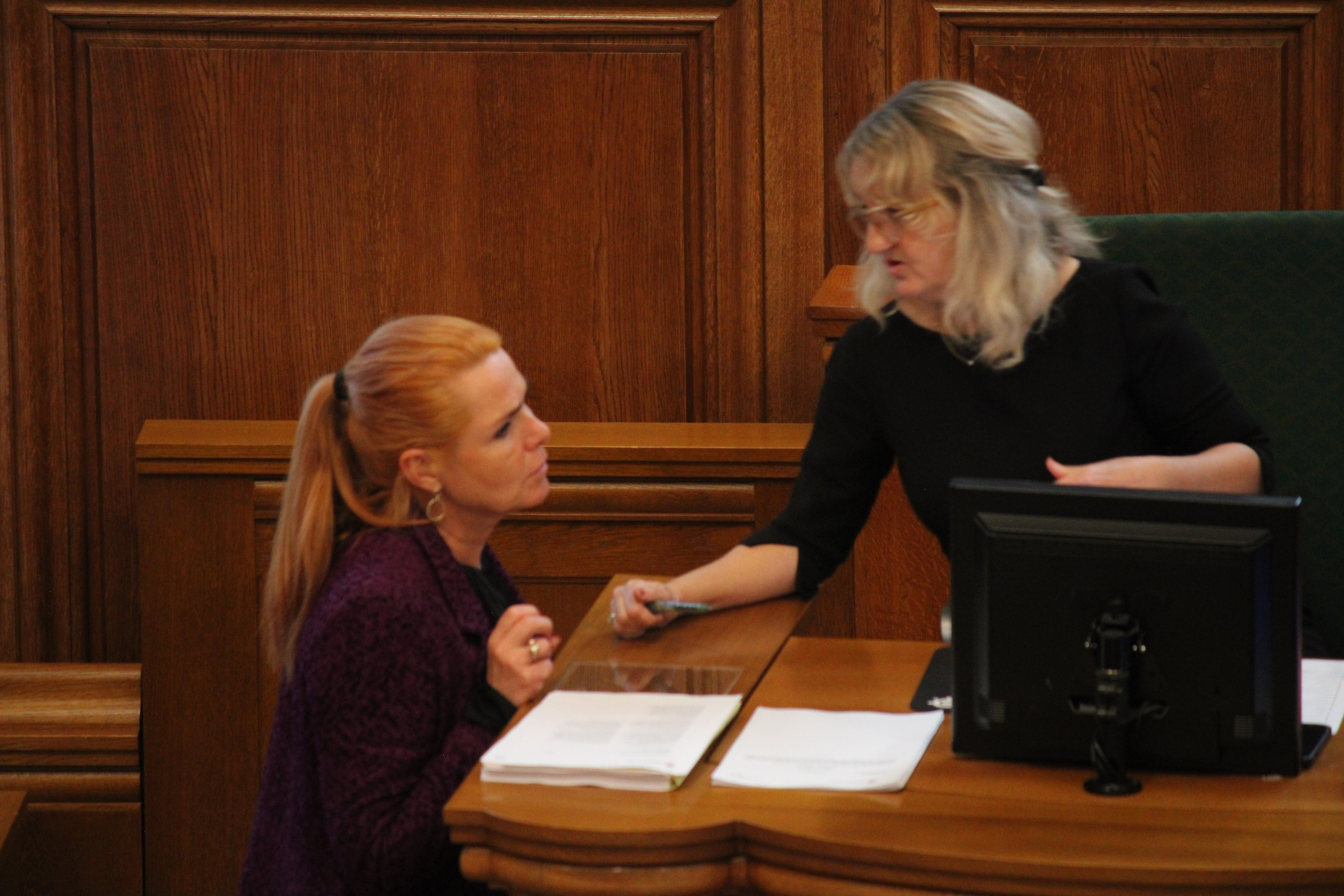
Vind (to the right) with Inger Støjberg in parliament, 2025

From 2010 to 2019 Vind was a member of Vejle Municipality's municipal council. She was elected into parliament at the 2019 election where she received 7,012 votes.
