= Kolding North (nomination district) =

- Kolding Nord
- Nomination district constituency for the Folketing
- Location of Kolding North within South Jutland

- Location of South Jutland within Denmark
- Municipalities: Kolding
- Constituency: South Jutland
- Electorate: 31,693 (2022)

Current constituency
- Created: 2007

Kolding North nominating district is one of the 92 nominating districts that were created for Danish elections following the 2007 municipal reform. It is one of the two nomination districts in Kolding Municipality, the other being Kolding South.

In general elections, the district is a strong area for parties commonly associated with the blue bloc.

== General elections results ==
=== General elections in the 2020s ===
2022 Danish general election

Parties	Vote		
Parties	Votes	%	+ / -
Social Democrats	6,383	24.50	+2.39
Venstre	4,012	15.40	-13.10
Moderates	2,861	10.98	New
Liberal Alliance	2,592	9.95	+7.24
Denmark Democrats	2,265	8.69	New
Green Left	1,914	7.35	+1.09
Conservatives	1,468	5.63	-1.16
New Right	1,326	5.09	+1.32
Social Liberals	880	3.38	-5.58
Red–Green Alliance	758	2.91	-1.74
Danish People's Party	704	2.70	-7.25
The Alternative	489	1.88	-0.33
Independent Greens	256	0.98	New
Christian Democrats	124	0.48	-1.24
Kent Nielsen	19	0.07	New
Kenneth Vestergaard	3	0.01	New
Total	26,054		

=== General elections in the 2010s ===
2019 Danish general election

Parties	Vote		
Parties	Votes	%	+ / -
Venstre	7,491	28.50	+5.15
Social Democrats	5,810	22.11	-0.55
Danish People's Party	2,616	9.95	-13.70
Social Liberals	2,354	8.96	+4.98
Conservatives	1,785	6.79	+3.68
Green Left	1,646	6.26	+1.87
Red–Green Alliance	1,222	4.65	-0.60
New Right	990	3.77	New
Liberal Alliance	712	2.71	-7.12
The Alternative	582	2.21	-0.89
Christian Democrats	451	1.72	+1.05
Stram Kurs	411	1.56	New
Klaus Riskær Pedersen Party	195	0.74	New
Michael Thomsen	16	0.06	New
Total	26,281		

2015 Danish general election

Parties	Vote		
Parties	Votes	%	+ / -
Danish People's Party	6,184	23.65	+10.72
Venstre	6,106	23.35	-9.20
Social Democrats	5,926	22.66	+2.16
Liberal Alliance	2,571	9.83	+3.56
Red–Green Alliance	1,372	5.25	+0.90
Green Left	1,149	4.39	-4.97
Social Liberals	1,041	3.98	-4.21
Conservatives	814	3.11	-2.01
The Alternative	811	3.10	New
Christian Democrats	174	0.67	-0.04
Total	26,148		

2011 Danish general election

Parties	Vote		
Parties	Votes	%	+ / -
Venstre	8,706	32.55	+0.53
Social Democrats	5,482	20.50	+1.90
Danish People's Party	3,458	12.93	-0.84
Green Left	2,503	9.36	-6.46
Social Liberals	2,190	8.19	+3.75
Liberal Alliance	1,676	6.27	+3.89
Conservatives	1,370	5.12	-6.15
Red–Green Alliance	1,163	4.35	+3.45
Christian Democrats	190	0.71	-0.09
Niesl-Aage Bjerre	3	0.01	New
Jørn Bjorholm	3	0.01	New
Total	26,744		

=== General elections in the 2000s ===
2007 Danish general election

Parties	Vote		
Parties	Votes	%	+ / -
Venstre	8,327	32.02	
Social Democrats	4,838	18.60	
Green Left	4,115	15.82	
Danish People's Party	3,582	13.77	
Conservatives	2,931	11.27	
Social Liberals	1,155	4.44	
New Alliance	619	2.38	
Red–Green Alliance	234	0.90	
Christian Democrats	207	0.80	
Total	26,008		

== European Parliament elections results ==
2024 European Parliament election in Denmark

Parties	Vote		
Parties	Votes	%	+ / -
Venstre	4,085	22.86	-8.19
Green Left	2,466	13.80	+4.50
Social Democrats	2,434	13.62	-5.57
Liberal Alliance	1,663	9.31	+6.18
Conservatives	1,623	9.08	+2.86
Social Liberals	1,148	6.42	-3.16
Danish People's Party	1,145	6.41	-5.38
Moderates	1,109	6.21	New
Denmark Democrats	1,090	6.10	New
Red–Green Alliance	782	4.38	+0.6
The Alternative	325	1.82	-0.91
Total	17,870		

2019 European Parliament election in Denmark

Parties	Vote		
Parties	Votes	%	+ / -
Venstre	6,328	31.05	+7.10
Social Democrats	3,912	19.19	+3.16
Danish People's Party	2,403	11.79	-16.27
Social Liberals	1,952	9.58	+3.78
Green Left	1,895	9.30	+1.68
Conservatives	1,267	6.22	-3.76
Red–Green Alliance	770	3.78	New
People's Movement against the EU	661	3.24	-2.14
Liberal Alliance	639	3.13	-0.05
The Alternative	556	2.73	New
Total	20,383		

2014 European Parliament election in Denmark

Parties	Vote		
Parties	Votes	%	+ / -
Danish People's Party	4,812	28.06	+12.37
Venstre	4,107	23.95	-1.90
Social Democrats	2,749	16.03	-1.65
Conservatives	1,711	9.98	-4.65
Green Left	1,307	7.62	-7.45
Social Liberals	994	5.80	+2.16
People's Movement against the EU	923	5.38	+0.33
Liberal Alliance	545	3.18	+2.59
Total	17,148		

2009 European Parliament election in Denmark

Parties	Vote		
Parties	Votes	%	+ / -
Venstre	4,496	25.85	
Social Democrats	3,074	17.68	
Danish People's Party	2,729	15.69	
Green Left	2,620	15.07	
Conservatives	2,545	14.63	
People's Movement against the EU	878	5.05	
Social Liberals	633	3.64	
June Movement	314	1.81	
Liberal Alliance	102	0.59	
Total	17,391		

== Referendums ==
2022 Danish European Union opt-out referendum

Option	Votes	%
✓ YES	13,754	67.25
X NO	6,697	32.75

2015 Danish European Union opt-out referendum

Option	Votes	%
X NO	11,022	50.52
✓ YES	10,794	49.48

2014 Danish Unified Patent Court membership referendum

Option	Votes	%
✓ YES	10,819	64.53
X NO	5,946	35.47

2009 Danish Act of Succession referendum

Option	Votes	%
✓ YES	14,193	86.20
X NO	2,272	13.80
