= Rasmus Vestergaard Madsen =

Danish politician (born 1991)

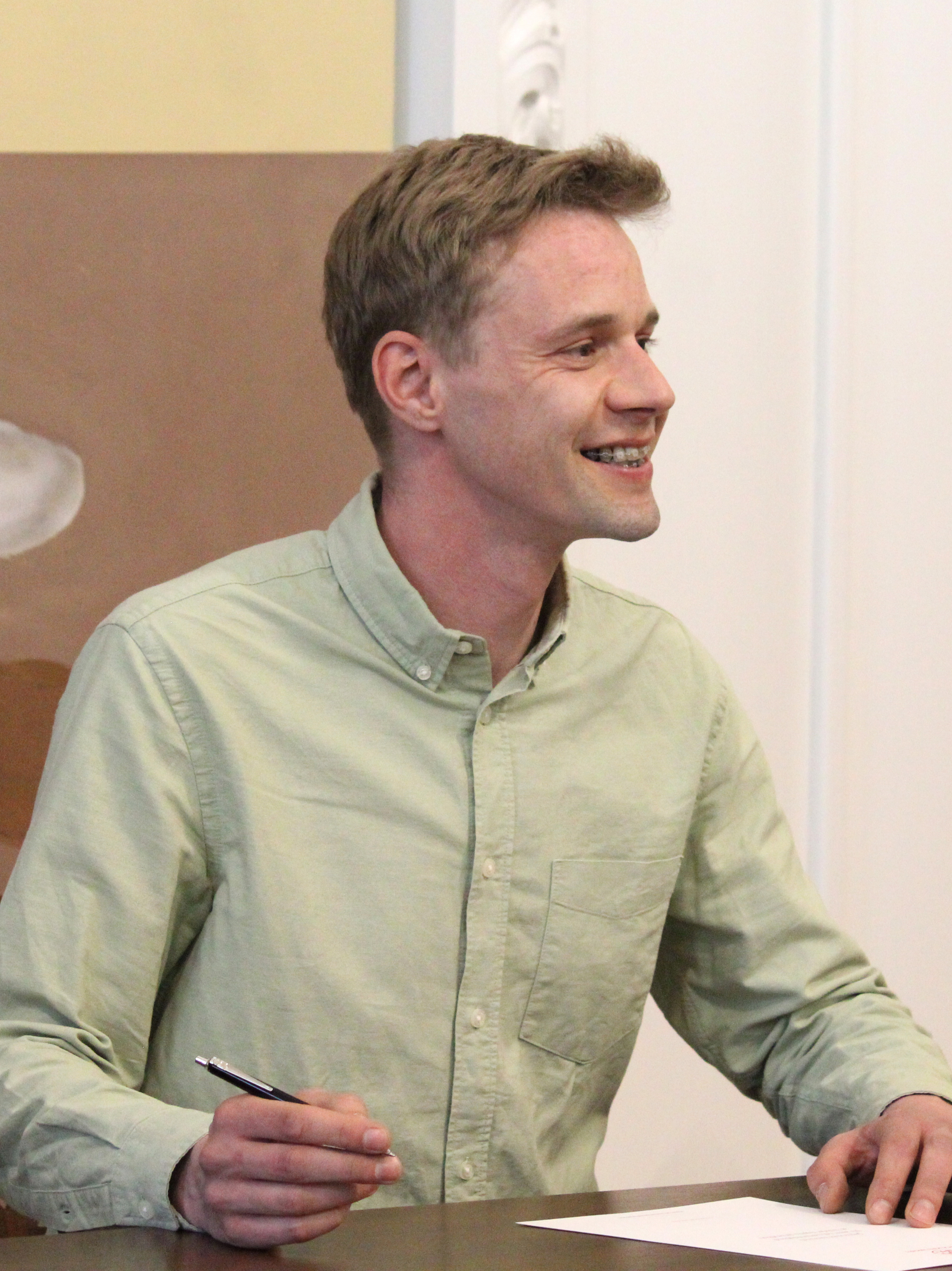
- Madsen in 2026

Member of the Folketing
- Incumbent
- Assumed office 24 March 2026
- Constituency: South Jutland

Personal details
- Born: 7 June 1991 (age 35) Tranbjerg, Denmark
- Party: Red–Green Alliance
- Education: VIA University College

Rasmus Vestergaard Madsen (born 7 June 1991) is a Danish politician and Member of the Folketing. A member of the Red–Green Alliance, he has represented South Jutland since March 2026.

Madsen was born on 7 June 1991 in Tranbjerg. He studied organic farming at the Kalø Organic Agricultural School (2010–2013) and social work at VIA University College (2015–2020). He works as an educator in Copenhagen and occasionally farms. He has been on the board of organic farming company Dansk Økojord A/S and the Organic Association of Denmark since 2022.

Madsen was a member of the Socialist Youth Front (SUF)'s execuitve from 2006 to 2007 and an activist with the Job Patrol scheme from 2007 to 2012. He was on the board of the Jutland Against Superfluous Highways (Jyder Mod Overflødige Motorveje) (2008–2010) and Danish Vocational Schools Student Organisation (Erhvervsskolernes Elevorganisation) (2010–2011). He served on the board of the Red–Green Alliance from 2015 to 2017. He served as a substitute member of the Folketing from October 2015 to November 2015, from September 2018 February 2019 and from January 2021 to June 2021. He was a member of the Parliamentary Assembly of the Council of Europe from October 2018 to January 2019. He was elected to the Folketing at the 2026 general election.

Electoral history of Rasmus Vestergaard Madsen
Election	Constituency	Party	Personal votes	Total votes	Result
2011 general	East Jutland	Red–Green Alliance	308	3,031	Not elected
2015 general	East Jutland	Red–Green Alliance	536	2,077	Not elected
2017 local	Aarhus Municipality	Red–Green Alliance	93		Not elected
2019 European	Denmark	Red–Green Alliance		1,292	Not elected
2019 general	South Jutland	Red–Green Alliance	821	2,610	Not elected
2022 general	South Jutland	Red–Green Alliance	486	1,931	Not elected
2026 general	South Jutland	Red–Green Alliance	856	2,458	Elected
