= Henning Hyllested =

Danish politician

Member of the Folketing
- In office 15 September 2011 – 2022
- Constituency: South Jutland

Personal details
- Born: 28 February 1954 (age 72) Esbjerg, Denmark
- Party: Red-Green Alliance

Henning Hyllested (born 28 February 1954 in Esbjerg) is a Danish politician, who was a member of the Folketing for the Red-Green Alliance political party. He was first elected into parliament at the 2011 Danish general election.

== Political career ==
Hyllested was elected into parliament in the 2011 election, where he received 2,267 votes. He was reelected in 2015 with 3,221 votes and in 2019 with 2,349 votes.
