= Kris Skriver =

Danish politician

Kris Jensen Skriver
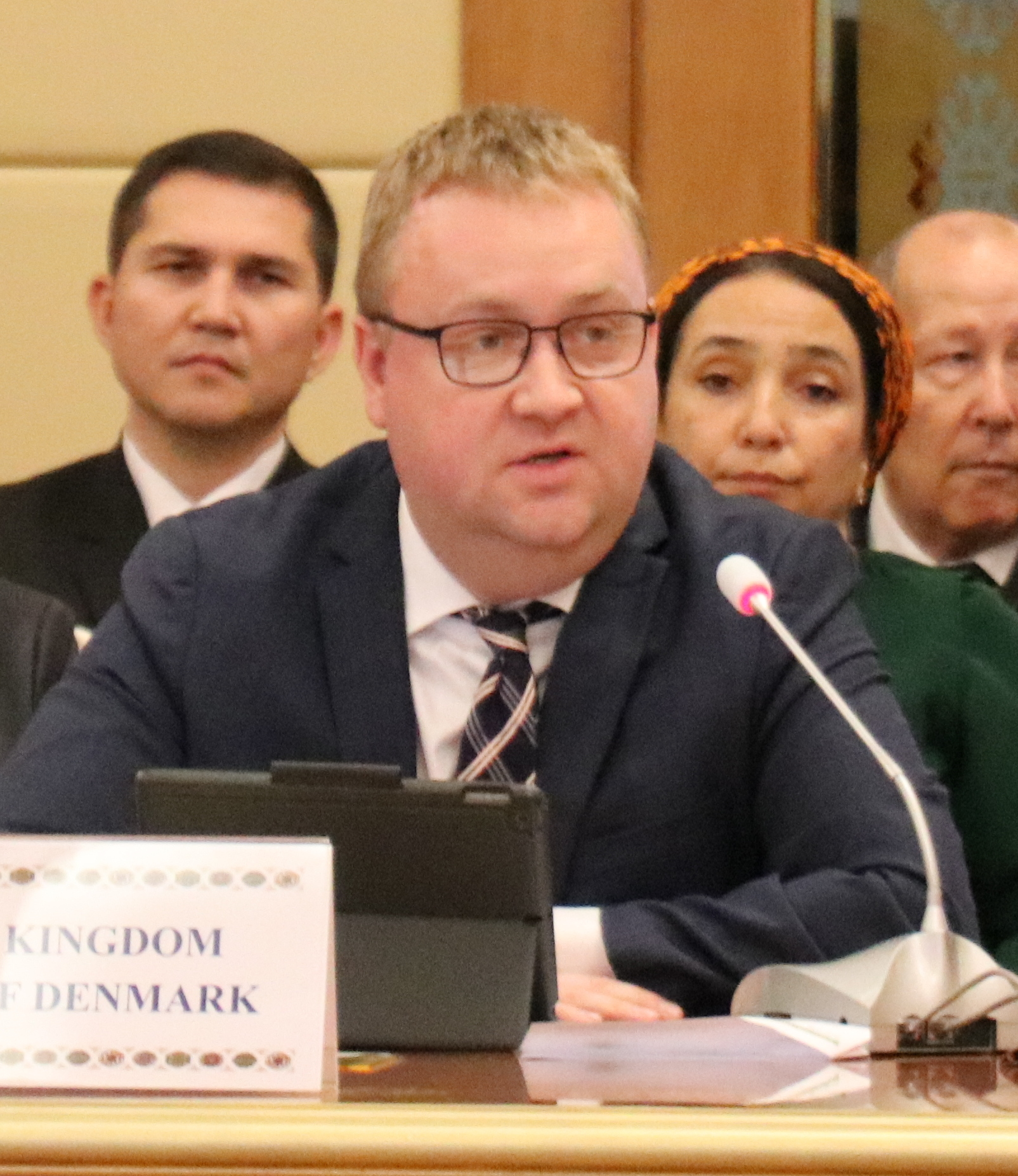
- Skriver in Turkmenistan in 2026

Member of the Folketing
- Incumbent
- Assumed office 1 November 2022
- Constituency: South Jutland

Personal details
- Born: November 10, 1988 (age 37) Vejle

Kris Jensen Skriver (born 10 November 1988) is a Danish politician and teacher serving as Member of the Folketing for the Social Democrats since 2022.

== Career ==
Skriver is a primary school teacher by trade, having graduated in 2014 and worked as one from 2014 to 2022. Also in 2014, Skriver became a local councillor in Billund Municipality, a position he held until he was elected to the Folketing as part of the 2022 Danish general election. Skriver received 3,723 personal votes.
