= Elections in Denmark =

There are three types of elections in Denmark: elections to the national parliament (the Folketing), local elections (to municipal and regional councils), and elections to the European Parliament. Referendums may also be called to consult the Danish citizens directly on an issue of national concern. Parliamentary elections are called by the Monarch on the advice of the Prime Minister, usually three to four years after the last election, although early elections may occur.

Elections to local councils (municipal or regional) and to the European Parliament are held on fixed dates. Elections use the party-list proportional representation system. All Danish citizens, living in the Kingdom of Denmark and at least 18 years of age, are eligible to vote in parliamentary elections and long-time residents may vote in local elections.

== Parliamentary elections ==
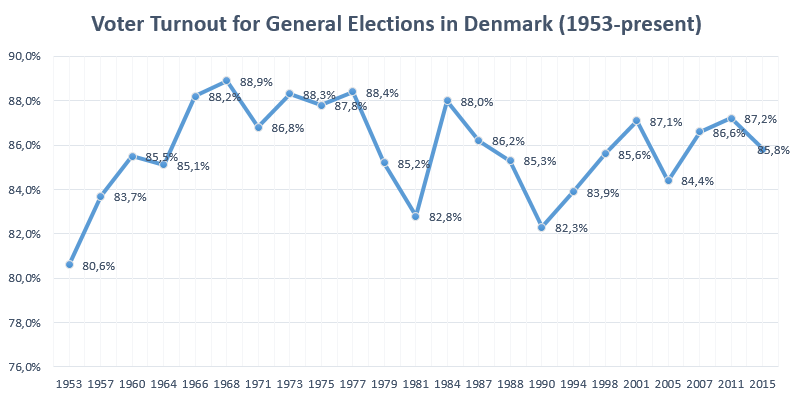
The voter turnout for the Danish general elections, 1953–2015

The Kingdom of Denmark (including the Faroe Islands and Greenland) elects a unicameral parliament, the Folketing, on a national level. Of the 179 members of parliament, the Faroe Islands and Greenland elect two members each, 135 are elected from ten multi-member constituencies on a party list PR system using the d'Hondt method and the remaining 40 seats are allocated as leveling seats to ensure proportionality at a national level.

Only parties that reach any one of three thresholds stipulated by section 77 of the Folketing (Parliamentary) Elections Act—winning at least one constituency seat; obtaining at least the Hare quota (valid votes in province/number of constituency seats in province) in two of the three provinces; or obtaining at least 2% of the national vote—may compete for leveling seats. Denmark has a multi-party system, with numerous parties in which no one party often has a chance of gaining power alone, and parties must work with each other to form coalition governments and/or minority cabinets. Elections to the Folketing must be held at least every four years.

== Latest general election ==
The last general election was held in March 2026.

Party	Votes	%	Seats	+/–
Denmark proper
Social Democrats	779,257	21.84	38	–12
Green Left	413,306	11.58	20	+5
Venstre	361,689	10.14	18	–5
Liberal Alliance	334,421	9.37	16	+2
Danish People's Party	324,518	9.10	16	+11
Moderates	274,775	7.70	14	–2
Conservative People's Party	270,749	7.59	13	+3
Red–Green Alliance	226,037	6.34	11	+2
Danish Social Liberal Party	207,442	5.81	10	+3
Denmark Democrats	205,302	5.75	10	–4
The Alternative	91,770	2.57	5	–1
Citizens' Party	75,920	2.13	4	+4
Independents	2,435	0.07	0	0
Total	3,567,621	100.00	175	0
Valid votes	3,567,621	98.71		
Invalid votes	9,051	0.25		
Blank votes	37,597	1.04		
Total votes	3,614,269	100.00		
Registered voters/turnout	4,317,926	83.70		
Source: dst.dk, dr.dk
Faroe Islands
Social Democratic Party	13,072	44.90	1	0
Union Party	7,341	25.22	1	0
People's Party	4,378	15.04	0	0
Republic	3,887	13.35	0	0
Centre Party	433	1.49	0	0
Total	29,111	100.00	2	0
Valid votes	29,111	99.00		
Invalid votes	107	0.36		
Blank votes	188	0.64		
Total votes	29,406	100.00		
Registered voters/turnout	38,955	75.49		
Source: valurslit.fo, kvf.fo
Greenland
Inuit Ataqatigiit	6,133	29.24	1	0
Naleraq	5,268	25.12	1	+1
Democrats	3,767	17.96	0	0
Siumut	3,515	16.76	0	–1
Atassut	2,290	10.92	0	0
Total	20,973	100.00	2	0
Valid votes	20,973	97.88		
Invalid votes	158	0.74		
Blank votes	297	1.39		
Total votes	21,428	100.00		
Registered voters/turnout	40,952	52.32		
Source: qinersineq.gl

== Local elections ==
Local elections in Denmark are held simultaneously for the ninety-eight municipal councils and the four regional councils on the third Tuesday of November every four years. Seats are allocated using the d'Hondt method of proportional representation. The latest elections were held on 18 November 2025.

== European elections ==
The Denmark constituency directly elects thirteen members to the European Parliament every five years. The d'Hondt method of proportional representation is used. The last elections took place in June 2024.

== Referendums ==
The Constitution of Denmark requires a referendum to be held in the following three cases:

- if one third of the members of the Parliament demands a referendum on a law that has been passed in the previous 30 days (excluding some ) (Section 42 of the Constitution), or
- a law that transfers sovereignty to an international organisation has not received a majority of five-sixths of the MPs (Section 20 of the Constitution), or
- in case of changing the electoral age (Section 29 of the Constitution).

The option for one third of the members of the Parliament to put a law to a referendum has a number of restrictions. Finance Bills, Supplementary Appropriation Bills, Provisional Appropriation Bills, Government Loan Bills, Civil Servants (Amendment) Bills, Salaries and Pensions Bills, Naturalization Bills, Expropriation Bills, Taxation (Direct and Indirect) Bills, as well as Bills introduced for the purpose The Work of Parliament of discharging existing treaty obligations shall not be decided by a referendum. (Section 42, Subsection 6 of the Constitution)

Even though the Constitution of Denmark requires referendum to be held only if super-majority of five-sixths of members of Parliament cannot be obtained, in practice, referendums have been held every time new treaties of the European Union have been approved, even when more than five-sixths can be found. Recently, the Danish government was highly criticized when it did not hold a referendum regarding the controversial Lisbon treaty. In all three cases, to defeat the proposition the no votes must not only outnumber the yes votes, they must also number at least 30% of the electorate.

The Constitution of Denmark can be changed only through the procedure set out in Section 88 of the Constitution. First, the government has to propose a change in constitution, then a parliamentary election is held. After the new parliament approves the same text of the constitutional changes, the proposal is put to a referendum. To pass, the yes votes must not only outnumber the no votes, they must also number at least 40% of the electorate. Of the 19 referendums held in Denmark, the most recent are the 2015 referendum on ending the opt-out from the European Union justice laws and the 2022 referendum on ending the opt-out from the European Union security and military framework.

== See also ==
- Cabinet of Denmark
- Electoral calendar
- Faroe election results
- Greenland election results
- Politics of Denmark
