= North Zealand (Folketing constituency) =

Constituency of the Folketing, the national legislature of Denmark

- Nordsjælland
- Constituency for the Folketing
- Location of North Zealand within Denmark
- Municipality: List: Allerød; Egedal; Fredensborg; Frederikssund; Furesø; Gribskov; Halsnæs; Helsingør; Hillerød; Hørsholm; Rudersdal
- Region: Capital
- Population: 481,722 (2026)
- Electorate: 346,650 (2026)
- Area: 1,449 km^{2} (2022)

Current constituency
- Created: 2007
- Seats: 10 (2007–present)
- Members of the Folketing: List: Mette Abildgaard (C); Hans Andersen (V); Marianne Bigum (F); Helene Liliendahl Brydensholt (Å); Jakob Engel-Schmidt (M); Steffen W. Frølund (I); Fie Hækkerup (A); Marlene Harpsøe (Æ); Martin Lidegaard (B); Sophie Løhde (V); Henrik Møller (A); Matilde Powers (A); Rasmus Stoklund (A); Mette Thiesen (u)
- Created from: Copenhagen County; Frederiksborg County

North Zealand (Danish: Nordsjælland) is one of the 12 multi-member constituencies of the Folketing, the national legislature of Denmark. The constituency was established in 2007 following the public administration structural reform. It consists of the municipalities of Allerød, Egedal, Fredensborg, Frederikssund, Furesø, Gribskov, Halsnæs, Helsingør, Hillerød, Hørsholm and Rudersdal. The constituency currently elects 10 of the 179 members of the Folketing using the open party-list proportional representation electoral system. At the 2026 general election it had 346,650 registered electors.

== Electoral system ==
North Zealand currently elects 10 of the 179 members of the Folketing using the open party-list proportional representation electoral system. Constituency seats are allocated using the D'Hondt method. Compensatory seats are calculated based on the national vote and are allocated using the Sainte-Laguë method, initially at the provincial level and finally at the constituency level. Only parties that reach any one of three thresholds stipulated by section 77 of the Folketing (Parliamentary) Elections Act - winning at least one constituency seat; obtaining at least the Hare quota (valid votes in province/number of constituency seats in province) in two of the three provinces; or obtaining at least 2% of the national vote - compete for compensatory seats.

== Election results ==
=== Summary ===
Election	Red–Green Ø			Green Left F			Alternative Å			Social Democrats A			Social Liberals B			Venstre V			Conservative People's C			Liberal Alliance I / Y			Danish People's O		
Election	Votes	%	Seats	Votes	%	Seats	Votes	%	Seats	Votes	%	Seats	Votes	%	Seats	Votes	%	Seats	Votes	%	Seats	Votes	%	Seats	Votes	%	Seats
2026	13,610	4.61%	0	35,234	11.93%	1	6,997	2.37%	0	55,960	18.94%	3	21,438	7.26%	1	25,506	8.63%	1	35,464	12.01%	1	30,314	10.26%	1	28,559	9.80%	1
2022	12,342	4.23%	0	22,642	7.76%	1	9,659	3.31%	0	69,653	23.88%	4	14,389	4.93%	0	42,873	14.70%	2	22,521	7.72%	1	27,497	9.43%	1	7,725	2.65%	0
2019	16,213	5.60%	0	19,993	6.90%	1	7,846	2.71%	0	61,801	21.33%	3	32,419	11.19%	1	67,742	23.39%	3	32,368	11.17%	1	9,581	3.31%	0	21,734	7.50%	1
2015	18,171	6.32%	1	11,182	3.89%	0	12,957	4.51%	0	64,822	22.55%	3	17,515	6.09%	0	59,155	20.58%	3	15,123	5.26%	0	32,744	11.39%	1	53,980	18.78%	2
2011	15,062	5.24%	0	21,012	7.31%	1				54,182	18.84%	2	33,537	11.66%	1	91,870	31.94%	4	19,765	6.87%	0	20,613	7.17%	1	30,279	10.53%	1
2007	5,612	2.00%	0	30,142	10.77%	1				57,861	20.67%	2	20,031	7.15%	1	78,834	28.16%	4	38,667	13.81%	1	12,107	4.32%	0	35,252	12.59%	1

(Excludes compensatory seats)

=== Detailed ===
==== 2026 ====
Results of the 2026 general election held on 24 March 2026:

Party		Votes per nomination district						Total Votes	%	Seats		
Party		Egedal	Fred- ens- borg	Fred- eriks- sund	Hel- singør	Hille- rød	Ruders- dal	Total Votes	%	Con.	Com.	Tot.
Social Democrats	A	11,045	6,349	11,478	8,500	11,636	6,952	55,960	18.94%	3	0	3
Conservative People's Party	C	6,287	5,872	3,538	4,264	6,833	8,670	35,464	12.01%	1	1	2
Green Left	F	6,988	3,846	6,536	5,106	7,641	5,117	35,234	11.93%	1	1	2
Moderates	M	5,380	4,900	3,698	3,892	6,266	6,355	30,491	10.32%	1	1	2
Liberal Alliance	I	5,075	5,212	4,658	3,595	5,565	6,209	30,314	10.26%	1	0	1
Danish People's Party	O	4,602	3,393	7,118	3,828	6,600	3,018	28,559	9.80%	1	0	1
Venstre	V	4,513	4,265	3,906	2,248	4,612	5,962	25,506	8.63%	1	0	1
Danish Social Liberal Party	B	4,374	3,410	1,648	2,657	3,495	5,854	21,438	7.26%	1	0	1
Red–Green Alliance	Ø	2,656	1,516	2,286	2,339	2,719	2,094	13,610	4.61%	0	1	1
The Alternative	Å	1,135	938	1,146	1,158	1,500	1,120	6,997	2.37%	0	0	0
Denmark Democrats	Æ	985	621	1,976	940	1,943	526	6,991	2.37%	0	1	1
Citizens' Party	H	774	536	1,210	612	1,243	467	4,842	1.64%	0	1	1
Valid votes		53,814	40,858	49,198	39,139	60,053	52,344	295,406	100.00%	10	6	16
Blank votes		475	245	512	328	594	354	2,508	0.84%			
Rejected votes – other		123	84	156	117	135	124	739	0.25%			
Total polled		54,412	41,187	49,866	39,584	60,782	52,822	298,653	86.62%			
Registered electors		61,561	47,461	59,908	47,576	71,205	58,939	346,650				
Turnout		88.39%	86.78%	83.24%	83.20%	85.36%	89.62%	86.15%				

The following candidates were elected:

- Constituency seats - Mette Abildgaard (C), 10,807 votes; Rasmus Lund-Nielsen (M), 3,574 votes; Steffen W. Frølund (I), 1,868 votes; Fie Hækkerup (A), 5,763 votes; Martin Lidegaard (B), 9,328 votes; Sophie Løhde (V), 12,514 votes; Jacob Mark (F), 12,139 votes; Matilde Powers (A), 4,030 votes; Rasmus Stoklund (A), 4,528 votes and Mette Thiesen (O), 4,555 votes.
- Compensatory seats - Birgitte Bergman (C), 3,176 votes; Pernille Christensen (M), 885 votes; Sinem Dybvad Demir (Ø), 3,346 votes; Marlene Harpsøe (Æ), 575 votes; Marianne Bigum (F), 2,384 votes and Emilie Schytte (H), 533 votes.

==== 2022 ====
Results of the 2022 general election held on 1 November 2022:

Party		Votes per nomination district						Total Votes	%	Seats		
Party		Egedal	Fred- ens- borg	Fred- eriks- sund	Hel- singør	Hille- rød	Ruders- dal	Total Votes	%	Con.	Com.	Tot.
Social Democrats	A	13,564	7,588	15,068	10,702	14,270	8,461	69,653	23.88%	4	0	4
Venstre	V	7,853	6,913	6,391	4,131	8,108	9,477	42,873	14.70%	2	0	2
Moderates	M	6,159	5,124	4,735	4,200	7,698	6,501	34,417	11.80%	1	0	1
Liberal Alliance	I	4,584	5,097	3,145	3,254	4,866	6,551	27,497	9.43%	1	0	1
Green Left	F	4,581	2,583	3,871	2,976	4,875	3,756	22,642	7.76%	1	0	1
Conservative People's Party	C	3,777	4,051	2,234	2,905	3,661	5,893	22,521	7.72%	1	0	1
Danish Social Liberal Party	B	2,865	2,215	1,118	1,801	2,293	4,097	14,389	4.93%	0	1	1
Denmark Democrats	Æ	2,125	1,455	3,571	1,816	3,592	1,300	13,859	4.75%	0	1	1
Red–Green Alliance	Ø	2,326	1,301	2,128	2,036	2,641	1,910	12,342	4.23%	0	0	0
The New Right	D	1,591	1,412	2,596	1,543	2,814	1,334	11,290	3.87%	0	1	1
The Alternative	Å	1,655	1,199	1,371	1,663	2,064	1,707	9,659	3.31%	0	1	1
Danish People's Party	O	1,321	916	1,987	964	1,733	804	7,725	2.65%	0	0	0
Independent Greens	Q	305	288	139	422	284	187	1,625	0.56%	0	0	0
Christian Democrats	K	113	116	113	96	338	102	878	0.30%	0	0	0
Jayseth Lotus Arrose Simonysano (Independent)		28	23	30	37	54	20	192	0.07%	0	0	0
Katjalivah Elleyhansen (Independent)		13	11	14	8	16	19	81	0.03%	0	0	0
Valid votes		52,860	40,292	48,511	38,554	59,307	52,119	291,643	100.00%	10	4	14
Blank votes		576	362	600	486	746	496	3,266	1.10%			
Rejected votes – other		163	101	184	166	151	177	942	0.32%			
Total polled		53,599	40,755	49,295	39,206	60,204	52,792	295,851	86.62%			
Registered electors		60,393	46,686	58,894	46,889	70,397	58,285	341,544				
Turnout		88.75%	87.30%	83.70%	83.61%	85.52%	90.58%	86.62%				

Votes per municipality:

Party		Votes per municipality											Total Votes
Party		Alle- rød	Egedal	Fred- ens- borg	Fred- eriks- sund	Furesø	Gribs- kov	Hals- næs	Hel- singør	Hille- rød	Hørs- holm	Ruders- dal	Total Votes
Social Democrats	A	3,402	7,604	5,437	8,529	5,960	6,499	6,539	10,702	7,771	2,151	5,059	69,653
Venstre	V	2,953	4,310	3,602	4,244	3,543	3,390	2,147	4,131	4,718	3,311	6,524	42,873
Moderates	M	2,005	3,277	2,874	2,928	2,882	3,778	1,807	4,200	3,920	2,250	4,496	34,417
Liberal Alliance	I	1,594	2,392	2,358	2,142	2,192	1,997	1,003	3,254	2,869	2,739	4,957	27,497
Green Left	F	1,450	2,313	1,940	2,241	2,268	1,770	1,630	2,976	3,105	643	2,306	22,642
Conservative People's Party	C	1,458	1,708	1,938	1,455	2,069	1,537	779	2,905	2,124	2,113	4,435	22,521
Danish Social Liberal Party	B	1,160	936	1,401	775	1,929	723	343	1,801	1,570	814	2,937	14,389
Denmark Democrats	Æ	587	1,528	979	2,019	597	2,120	1,552	1,816	1,472	476	713	13,859
Red–Green Alliance	Ø	599	957	996	1,137	1,369	1,047	991	2,036	1,594	305	1,311	12,342
The New Right	D	514	1,052	858	1,572	539	1,543	1,024	1,543	1,271	554	820	11,290
The Alternative	Å	470	660	916	654	995	853	717	1,663	1,211	283	1,237	9,659
Danish People's Party	O	262	881	591	1,242	440	1,020	745	964	713	325	542	7,725
Independent Greens	Q	65	142	224	93	163	60	46	422	224	64	122	1,625
Christian Democrats	K	43	62	85	66	51	165	47	96	173	31	59	878
Jayseth Lotus Arrose Simonysano (Independent)		5	14	18	14	14	36	16	37	18	5	15	192
Katjalivah Elleyhansen (Independent)		7	2	9	9	11	8	5	8	8	2	12	81
Valid votes		16,574	27,838	24,226	29,120	25,022	26,546	19,391	38,554	32,761	16,066	35,545	291,643
Blank votes		180	350	254	370	226	337	230	486	409	108	316	3,266
Rejected votes – other		52	79	62	129	84	69	55	166	82	39	125	942
Total polled		16,806	28,267	24,542	29,619	25,332	26,952	19,676	39,206	33,252	16,213	35,986	295,851
Registered electors		18,325	31,957	28,558	35,069	28,436	31,901	23,825	46,889	38,496	18,128	39,960	341,544
Turnout		91.71%	88.45%	85.94%	84.46%	89.08%	84.49%	82.59%	83.61%	86.38%	89.44%	90.06%	86.62%

The following candidates were elected:

- Constituency seats - Mette Abildgaard (C), 11,906 votes; Hans Andersen (V), 7,177 votes; Marianne Bigum (F), 2,823 votes; Jakob Engel-Schmidt (M), 4,252 votes; Fie Hækkerup (A), 5,789 votes; Steffen Larsen (I), 2,120 votes; Sophie Løhde (V), 23,583 votes; Henrik Møller (A), 4,218 votes; Matilde Powers (A), 4,221 votes; and Rasmus Stoklund (A), 4,647 votes.
- Compensatory seats - Helene Liliendahl Brydensholt (Å), 1,183 votes; Marlene Harpsøe (Æ), 1,669 votes; Martin Lidegaard (B), 7,167 votes; and Mette Thiesen (D), 4,357 votes.

==== 2019 ====
Results of the 2019 general election held on 5 June 2019:

Party		Votes per nomination district						Total Votes	%	Seats		
Party		Egedal	Fred- ens- borg	Fred- eriks- sund	Hel- singør	Hille- rød	Ruders- dal	Total Votes	%	Con.	Com.	Tot.
Venstre	V	12,063	10,701	11,289	6,500	13,996	13,193	67,742	23.39%	3	0	3
Social Democrats	A	11,701	6,671	13,198	9,520	13,131	7,580	61,801	21.33%	3	0	3
Danish Social Liberal Party	B	6,516	5,168	2,954	4,219	5,362	8,200	32,419	11.19%	1	1	2
Conservative People's Party	C	5,486	6,320	3,016	4,237	4,786	8,523	32,368	11.17%	1	1	2
Danish People's Party	O	3,607	2,572	5,326	3,127	4,869	2,233	21,734	7.50%	1	0	1
Socialist People's Party	F	3,948	2,359	3,862	2,766	4,015	3,043	19,993	6.90%	1	0	1
Red–Green Alliance	Ø	2,912	1,717	2,840	2,881	3,441	2,422	16,213	5.60%	0	1	1
Liberal Alliance	I	1,699	1,829	906	1,126	1,580	2,441	9,581	3.31%	0	0	0
The New Right	D	1,407	1,255	1,852	1,453	2,118	1,354	9,439	3.26%	0	1	1
The Alternative	Å	1,365	944	1,070	1,229	1,765	1,473	7,846	2.71%	0	0	0
Hard Line	P	653	490	961	672	1,048	452	4,276	1.48%	0	0	0
Christian Democrats	K	450	383	407	297	1,283	409	3,229	1.11%	0	0	0
Klaus Riskær Pedersen	E	459	376	536	405	566	411	2,753	0.95%	0	0	0
Gert Lassen (Independent)		30	27	41	26	86	49	259	0.09%	0	0	0
Hans Frederik Brobjerg (Independent)		5	1	3	5	8	1	23	0.01%	0	0	0
Valid votes		52,301	40,813	48,261	38,463	58,054	51,784	289,676	100.00%	10	4	14
Blank votes		339	198	359	286	377	280	1,839	0.63%			
Rejected votes – other		118	62	134	105	142	128	689	0.24%			
Total polled		52,758	41,073	48,754	38,854	58,573	52,192	292,204	87.07%			
Registered electors		58,981	46,598	57,957	46,229	68,049	57,787	335,601				
Turnout		89.45%	88.14%	84.12%	84.05%	86.07%	90.32%	87.07%				

Votes per municipality:

Party		Votes per municipality											Total Votes
Party		Alle- rød	Egedal	Fred- ens- borg	Fred- eriks- sund	Furesø	Gribs- kov	Hals- næs	Hel- singør	Hille- rød	Hørs- holm	Ruders- dal	Total Votes
Venstre	V	3,977	6,889	5,605	7,245	5,174	6,877	4,044	6,500	7,119	5,096	9,216	67,742
Social Democrats	A	3,079	6,730	4,802	7,548	4,971	5,782	5,650	9,520	7,349	1,869	4,501	61,801
Danish Social Liberal Party	B	2,359	2,566	3,258	1,927	3,950	1,798	1,027	4,219	3,564	1,910	5,841	32,419
Conservative People's Party	C	2,380	2,406	2,787	2,036	3,080	2,095	980	4,237	2,691	3,533	6,143	32,368
Danish People's Party	O	907	2,478	1,767	3,054	1,129	2,802	2,272	3,127	2,067	805	1,326	21,734
Socialist People's Party	F	1,171	1,961	1,764	1,981	1,987	1,670	1,881	2,766	2,345	595	1,872	19,993
Red–Green Alliance	Ø	782	1,234	1,324	1,654	1,678	1,464	1,186	2,881	1,977	393	1,640	16,213
Liberal Alliance	I	560	862	908	600	837	602	306	1,126	978	921	1,881	9,581
The New Right	D	468	873	739	1,089	534	1,094	763	1,453	1,024	516	886	9,439
The Alternative	Å	424	575	719	599	790	761	471	1,229	1,004	225	1,049	7,846
Hard Line	P	144	411	313	552	242	585	409	672	463	177	308	4,276
Christian Democrats	K	171	227	257	245	223	579	162	297	704	126	238	3,229
Klaus Riskær Pedersen	E	115	278	253	295	181	339	241	405	227	123	296	2,753
Gert Lassen (Independent)		18	13	19	16	17	42	25	26	44	8	31	259
Hans Frederik Brobjerg (Independent)		1	3	1	2	2	4	1	5	4	0	0	23
Valid votes		16,556	27,506	24,516	28,843	24,795	26,494	19,418	38,463	31,560	16,297	35,228	289,676
Blank votes		102	199	127	227	140	166	132	286	211	71	178	1,839
Rejected votes – other		50	66	43	71	52	72	63	105	70	19	78	689
Total polled		16,708	27,771	24,686	29,141	24,987	26,732	19,613	38,854	31,841	16,387	35,484	292,204
Registered electors		18,276	30,988	28,323	34,253	27,993	31,484	23,704	46,229	36,565	18,275	39,511	335,601
Turnout		91.42%	89.62%	87.16%	85.08%	89.26%	84.91%	82.74%	84.05%	87.08%	89.67%	89.81%	87.07%

The following candidates were elected:

- Constituency seats - Mette Abildgaard (C), 18,962 votes; Hans Andersen (V), 13,415 votes; Claus Hjort Frederiksen (V), 13,413 votes; Nick Hækkerup (A), 23,881 votes; Martin Lidegaard (B), 12,703 votes; Sophie Løhde (V), 23,801 votes; Morten Messerschmidt (O), 7,554 votes; Henrik Møller (A), 8,339 votes; Rasmus Stoklund (A), 9,759 votes; and Trine Torp (F), 4,307 votes.
- Compensatory seats - Birgitte Bergman (C), 5,102 votes; Kristian Hegaard (B), 1,945 votes; Mette Thiesen (D), 4,354 votes; and Mai Villadsen (Ø), 4,926 votes.

==== 2015 ====
Results of the 2015 general election held on 18 June 2015:

Party		Votes per nomination district						Total Votes	%	Seats		
Party		Egedal	Fred- ens- borg	Fred- eriks- sund	Hel- singør	Hille- rød	Ruders- dal	Total Votes	%	Con.	Com.	Tot.
Social Democrats	A	12,701	7,523	12,770	9,688	12,889	9,251	64,822	22.55%	3	0	3
Venstre	V	10,613	9,377	9,466	5,552	12,358	11,789	59,155	20.58%	3	0	3
Danish People's Party	O	9,041	6,441	12,048	8,019	12,234	6,197	53,980	18.78%	2	1	3
Liberal Alliance	I	5,724	6,182	3,149	3,690	5,362	8,637	32,744	11.39%	1	1	2
Red–Green Alliance	Ø	3,153	2,003	3,514	3,124	3,902	2,475	18,171	6.32%	1	0	1
Danish Social Liberal Party	B	3,613	2,848	1,511	2,036	2,893	4,614	17,515	6.09%	0	1	1
Conservative People's Party	C	2,447	3,083	1,313	2,388	2,030	3,862	15,123	5.26%	0	1	1
The Alternative	Å	2,199	1,633	1,920	2,081	2,840	2,284	12,957	4.51%	0	1	1
Socialist People's Party	F	1,977	1,311	2,279	1,536	2,366	1,713	11,182	3.89%	0	1	1
Christian Democrats	K	182	161	197	144	819	177	1,680	0.58%	0	0	0
Aleks Jensen (Independent)		15	11	20	9	11	2	68	0.02%	0	0	0
Gert Lassen (Independent)		5	4	3	2	6	14	34	0.01%	0	0	0
Valid votes		51,670	40,577	48,190	38,269	57,710	51,015	287,431	100.00%	10	6	16
Blank votes		358	256	339	259	420	325	1,957	0.67%			
Rejected votes – other		142	83	183	123	163	140	834	0.29%			
Total polled		52,170	40,916	48,712	38,651	58,293	51,480	290,222	88.27%			
Registered electors		57,722	46,116	56,789	45,463	66,262	56,449	328,801				
Turnout		90.38%	88.72%	85.78%	85.02%	87.97%	91.20%	88.27%				

Votes per municipality:

Party		Votes per municipality											Total Votes
Party		Alle- rød	Egedal	Fred- ens- borg	Fred- eriks- sund	Furesø	Gribs- kov	Hals- næs	Hel- singør	Hille- rød	Hørs- holm	Ruders- dal	Total Votes
Social Democrats	A	3,450	6,778	5,139	7,251	5,923	5,541	5,519	9,688	7,348	2,384	5,801	64,822
Venstre	V	3,483	5,955	4,998	6,158	4,658	5,932	3,308	5,552	6,426	4,379	8,306	59,155
Danish People's Party	O	2,388	6,026	4,267	7,017	3,015	6,889	5,031	8,019	5,345	2,174	3,809	53,980
Liberal Alliance	I	2,012	2,698	2,920	2,027	3,026	2,343	1,122	3,690	3,019	3,262	6,625	32,744
Red–Green Alliance	Ø	798	1,351	1,551	1,919	1,802	1,733	1,595	3,124	2,169	452	1,677	18,171
Danish Social Liberal Party	B	1,287	1,380	1,729	1,065	2,233	976	446	2,036	1,917	1,119	3,327	17,515
Conservative People's Party	C	1,171	1,113	1,357	872	1,334	792	441	2,388	1,238	1,726	2,691	15,123
The Alternative	Å	622	909	1,189	1,056	1,290	1,332	864	2,081	1,508	444	1,662	12,957
Socialist People's Party	F	664	959	999	1,221	1,018	954	1,058	1,536	1,412	312	1,049	11,182
Christian Democrats	K	72	89	123	105	93	388	92	144	431	38	105	1,680
Aleks Jensen (Independent)		1	5	9	15	10	2	5	9	9	2	1	68
Gert Lassen (Independent)		2	4	4	1	1	1	2	2	5	0	12	34
Valid votes		15,950	27,267	24,285	28,707	24,403	26,883	19,483	38,269	30,827	16,292	35,065	287,431
Blank votes		119	184	169	213	174	190	126	259	230	87	206	1,957
Rejected votes – other		40	77	49	109	65	76	74	123	87	34	100	834
Total polled		16,109	27,528	24,503	29,029	24,642	27,149	19,683	38,651	31,144	16,413	35,371	290,222
Registered electors		17,462	30,333	27,969	33,493	27,389	31,061	23,296	45,463	35,201	18,147	38,987	328,801
Turnout		92.25%	90.75%	87.61%	86.67%	89.97%	87.41%	84.49%	85.02%	88.47%	90.44%	90.73%	88.27%

The following candidates were elected:

- Constituency seats - Pia Adelsteen (O), 14,057 votes; Hans Andersen (V), 9,386 votes; Christine Antorini (A), 18,523 votes; Claus Hjort Frederiksen (V), 16,067 votes; Maria Reumert Gjerding (Ø), 5,167 votes; Nick Hækkerup (A), 26,064 votes; Marlene Harpsøe (O), 15,094 votes; Sophie Løhde (V), 22,560 votes; Anders Samuelsen (I), 29,204 votes; and Pernille Schnoor (A), 9,073 votes.
- Compensatory seats - Mette Abildgaard (C), 6,071 votes; May-Britt Buch-Kattrup (I), 913 votes; Martin Lidegaard (B), 12,477 votes; Jan-Erik Messmann (O), 8,725 votes; Christian Poll (Å), 7,452 votes; and Trine Torp (F), 5,927 votes.

==== 2011 ====
Results of the 2011 general election held on 15 September 2011:

Party		Votes per nomination district						Total Votes	%	Seats		
Party		Egedal	Fred- ens- borg	Fred- eriks- sund	Hel- singør	Hille- rød	Ruders- dal	Total Votes	%	Con.	Com.	Tot.
Venstre	V	15,618	14,314	14,555	9,953	19,535	17,895	91,870	31.94%	4	0	4
Social Democrats	A	10,082	5,981	11,530	9,092	10,989	6,508	54,182	18.84%	2	0	2
Danish Social Liberal Party	B	6,701	4,942	3,900	4,237	6,133	7,624	33,537	11.66%	1	1	2
Danish People's Party	O	5,143	3,679	6,884	4,519	6,526	3,528	30,279	10.53%	1	0	1
Socialist People's Party	F	3,623	2,411	4,363	3,289	4,319	3,007	21,012	7.31%	1	0	1
Liberal Alliance	I	3,725	3,679	2,439	2,344	3,335	5,091	20,613	7.17%	1	0	1
Conservative People's Party	C	3,478	4,216	1,868	2,436	2,936	4,831	19,765	6.87%	0	1	1
Red–Green Alliance	Ø	2,649	1,549	2,910	2,469	3,324	2,161	15,062	5.24%	0	1	1
Christian Democrats	K	127	112	195	95	515	127	1,171	0.41%	0	0	0
Bjarne Holm (Independent)		14	15	16	11	21	22	99	0.03%	0	0	0
Valid votes		51,160	40,898	48,660	38,445	57,633	50,794	287,590	100.00%	10	3	13
Blank votes		264	145	263	224	302	228	1,426	0.49%			
Rejected votes – other		169	64	204	152	158	139	886	0.31%			
Total polled		51,593	41,107	49,127	38,821	58,093	51,161	289,902	90.09%			
Registered electors		56,043	45,240	56,122	44,425	64,666	55,287	321,783				
Turnout		92.06%	90.86%	87.54%	87.39%	89.84%	92.54%	90.09%				

Votes per municipality:

Party		Votes per municipality											Total Votes
Party		Alle- rød	Egedal	Fred- ens- borg	Fred- eriks- sund	Furesø	Gribs- kov	Hals- næs	Hel- singør	Hille- rød	Hørs- holm	Ruders- dal	Total Votes
Venstre	V	5,216	8,838	7,779	9,156	6,780	10,183	5,399	9,953	9,352	6,535	12,679	91,870
Social Democrats	A	2,414	5,663	4,281	6,457	4,419	4,799	5,073	9,092	6,190	1,700	4,094	54,182
Danish Social Liberal Party	B	2,181	2,958	3,103	2,464	3,743	2,387	1,436	4,237	3,746	1,839	5,443	33,537
Danish People's Party	O	1,328	3,293	2,432	3,929	1,850	3,605	2,955	4,519	2,921	1,247	2,200	30,279
Socialist People's Party	F	1,156	1,757	1,906	2,394	1,866	1,894	1,969	3,289	2,425	505	1,851	21,012
Liberal Alliance	I	1,271	1,858	1,855	1,543	1,867	1,440	896	2,344	1,895	1,824	3,820	20,613
Conservative People's Party	C	1,362	1,590	1,965	1,187	1,888	1,091	681	2,436	1,845	2,251	3,469	19,765
Red–Green Alliance	Ø	632	1,072	1,170	1,518	1,577	1,433	1,392	2,469	1,891	379	1,529	15,062
Christian Democrats	K	67	75	85	110	52	251	85	95	264	27	60	1,171
Bjarne Holm (Independent)		4	8	12	9	6	9	7	11	12	3	18	99
Valid votes		15,631	27,112	24,588	28,767	24,048	27,092	19,893	38,445	30,541	16,310	35,163	287,590
Blank votes		88	144	99	153	120	150	110	224	152	46	140	1,426
Rejected votes – other		45	90	41	138	79	61	66	152	97	23	94	886
Total polled		15,764	27,346	24,728	29,058	24,247	27,303	20,069	38,821	30,790	16,379	35,397	289,902
Registered electors		16,894	29,533	27,512	32,904	26,510	30,555	23,218	44,425	34,111	17,728	38,393	321,783
Turnout		93.31%	92.59%	89.88%	88.31%	91.46%	89.36%	86.44%	87.39%	90.26%	92.39%	92.20%	90.09%

The following candidates were elected:

- Constituency seats - Pia Adelsteen (O), 9,624 votes; Hans Andersen (V), 1,722 votes; Christine Antorini (A), 19,710 votes; Pia Olsen Dyhr (F), 6,603 votes; Claus Hjort Frederiksen (V), 5,096 votes; Nick Hækkerup (A), 15,091 votes; Sophie Løhde (V), 9,776 votes; Lars Løkke Rasmussen (V), 72,786 votes; Anders Samuelsen (I), 18,472 votes; and Margrethe Vestager (B), 30,376 votes.
- Compensatory seats - Jørgen Arbo-Bæhr (Ø), 3,210 votes; Christian Friis Bach (B), 2,015 votes; and Lars Barfoed (C), 13,577 votes.

==== 2007 ====
Results of the 2007 general election held on 13 November 2007:

Party		Votes per nomination district						Total Votes	%	Seats		
Party		Egedal	Fred- ens- borg	Fred- eriks- sund	Hel- singør	Hille- rød	Ruders- dal	Total Votes	%	Con.	Com.	Tot.
Venstre	V	13,420	12,600	12,406	8,511	15,797	16,100	78,834	28.16%	4	0	4
Social Democrats	A	10,154	6,526	12,279	9,523	12,261	7,118	57,861	20.67%	2	1	3
Conservative People's Party	C	7,335	7,396	4,462	4,425	6,228	8,821	38,667	13.81%	1	1	2
Danish People's Party	O	5,979	4,405	7,990	5,163	7,559	4,156	35,252	12.59%	1	1	2
Socialist People's Party	F	5,654	3,278	5,567	4,844	6,208	4,591	30,142	10.77%	1	1	2
Danish Social Liberal Party	B	3,752	3,054	2,298	2,590	3,495	4,842	20,031	7.15%	1	0	1
New Alliance	Y	2,231	2,042	1,429	1,535	2,095	2,775	12,107	4.32%	0	1	1
Unity List	Ø	993	643	863	949	1,227	937	5,612	2.00%	0	0	0
Christian Democrats	K	181	137	221	156	577	185	1,457	0.52%	0	0	0
Valid votes		49,699	40,081	47,515	37,696	55,447	49,525	279,963	100.00%	10	5	15
Blank votes		196	139	220	132	211	164	1,062	0.38%			
Rejected votes – other		88	84	125	68	123	110	598	0.21%			
Total polled		49,983	40,304	47,860	37,896	55,781	49,799	281,623	89.05%			
Registered electors		54,548	44,926	55,288	44,073	62,986	54,439	316,260				
Turnout		91.63%	89.71%	86.56%	85.98%	88.56%	91.48%	89.05%				

Votes per municipality:

Party		Votes per municipality											Total Votes
Party		Alle- rød	Egedal	Fred- ens- borg	Fred- eriks- sund	Furesø	Gribs- kov	Hals- næs (Note: Halsnæs Municipality was known as Frederiksværk-Hundested Municipality prior to January 2008.)	Hel- singør	Hille- rød	Hørs- holm	Ruders- dal	Total Votes
Venstre	V	4,603	7,755	6,904	7,685	5,665	8,265	4,721	8,511	7,532	5,696	11,497	78,834
Social Democrats	A	2,488	5,543	4,654	7,005	4,611	5,166	5,274	9,523	7,095	1,872	4,630	57,861
Conservative People's Party	C	2,566	3,675	3,535	3,004	3,660	2,504	1,458	4,425	3,724	3,861	6,255	38,667
Danish People's Party	O	1,493	3,581	2,889	4,496	2,398	4,245	3,494	5,163	3,314	1,516	2,663	35,252
Socialist People's Party	F	1,595	2,460	2,525	3,164	3,194	2,898	2,403	4,844	3,310	753	2,996	30,142
Danish Social Liberal Party	B	1,323	1,532	1,897	1,379	2,220	1,471	919	2,590	2,024	1,157	3,519	20,031
New Alliance	Y	711	994	1,148	890	1,237	947	539	1,535	1,148	894	2,064	12,107
Unity List	Ø	218	353	489	437	640	453	426	949	774	154	719	5,612
Christian Democrats	K	85	94	106	95	87	279	126	156	298	31	100	1,457
Valid votes		15,082	25,987	24,147	28,155	23,712	26,228	19,360	37,696	29,219	15,934	34,443	279,963
Blank votes		43	99	100	140	97	90	80	132	121	39	121	1,062
Rejected votes – other		30	49	62	83	39	62	42	68	61	22	80	598
Total polled		15,155	26,135	24,309	28,378	23,848	26,380	19,482	37,896	29,401	15,995	34,644	281,623
Registered electors		16,448	28,471	27,299	32,337	26,077	30,057	22,951	44,073	32,929	17,627	37,991	316,260
Turnout		92.14%	91.80%	89.05%	87.76%	91.45%	87.77%	84.89%	85.98%	89.29%	90.74%	91.19%	89.05%

The following candidates were elected:

- Constituency seats - Pia Adelsteen (O), 11,091 votes; Pia Christmas-Møller (C), 13,206 votes; Pia Olsen Dyhr (F), 11,439 votes; Claus Hjort Frederiksen (V), 9,950 votes; Nick Hækkerup (A), 23,014 votes; Sophie Løhde (V), 11,160 votes; Lone Møller (A), 13,506 votes; Thor Pedersen (V), 9,946 votes; Lars Løkke Rasmussen (V), 38,375 votes; and Margrethe Vestager (B), 17,947 votes.
- Compensatory seats - Malou Aamund (Y), 9,300 votes; Lars Barfoed (C), 9,280 votes; Klaus Hækkerup (A), 10,146 votes; Marlene Harpsøe (O), 6,096 votes; and Nanna Westerby (F), 7,089 votes.
