= Henrik Møller =

Henrik Møller may refer to:

- Henrik Møller (speedway rider)
- Henrik Møller (politician)
