= Mette Thiesen =

Danish politician (born 1981)

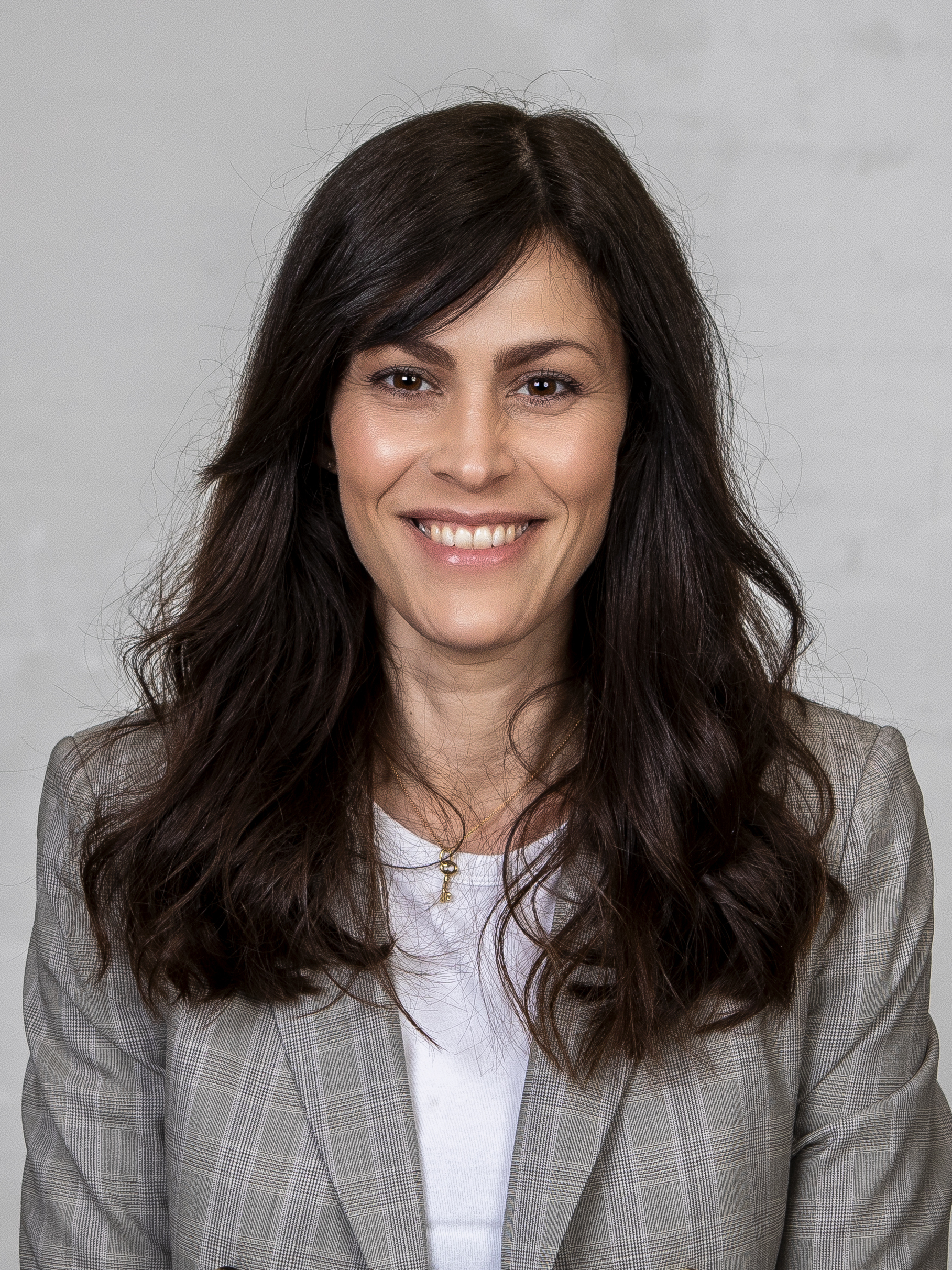
- Thiesen in 2023

Member of the Folketing
- Incumbent
- Assumed office 5 June 2019
- Constituency: North Zealand

Member of Hillerød City Council
- In office 1 January 2014 – 31 December 2021

Personal details
- Born: 20 December 1981 (age 44) Fredensborg, Denmark
- Party: Danish People's Party (2023–present)
- Other political affiliations: Conservative People's Party (2013–2017); Nye Borgerlige (2017–2022)

Mette Thiesen (born 20 December 1981) is a Danish politician and former schoolteacher who has been a member of the Folketing since June 2019, at first representing the Nye Borgerlige political party, but from November 2022 being an independent, and from February 2023 representing the Danish People's Party.

Thiesen was a city council member in Hillerød Municipality from January 2014 until December 2021, first representing the Conservative People's Party and from May 2017, when she changed her party allegiance, the Nye Borgerlige party. In November 2022 she left Nye Borgerlige due to personal issues, consequently becoming the fastest politician in Danish history to leave the party she was elected for, having left six days after her re-election in the 2022 general election.

== Background ==
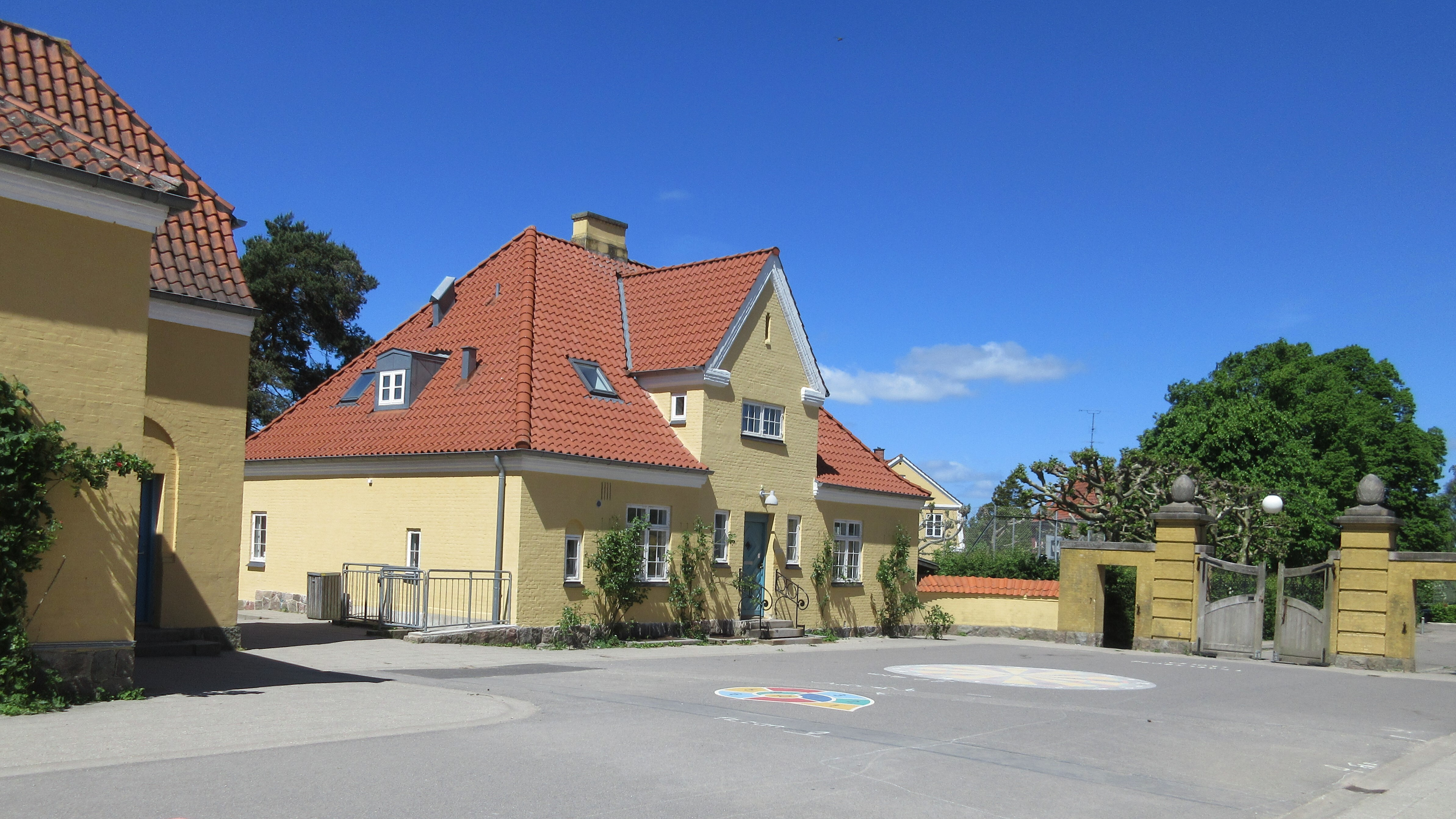
Engelsborgskolen in Kongens Lyngby where Thiesen served as a teacher from 2017 until 2019.

Mette Thiesen was born in Fredensborg as the daughter of radio mechanic Michael Petersen and teacher Jytte Thiesen. She graduated from Espergærde Gymnasium in 2001 and underwent a teacher education at N. Zahles Seminarium 2004-2008.

In interviews Thiesen has described her childhood home as leftist but politics at the same not being a usual point of discussion and explained how she got most of her political values from her grandfather who voted for Mogens Glistrup's Progress Party (Fremskridtspartiet).

After finishing education she worked at different elementary schools from 2008 until 2019 where she was elected af member of the Folketing. She is the mother of two boys.

== Political career ==
=== The Conservative People's Party ===
At the 2013 local elections Thiesen was elected a member of the city council in Hillerød Municipality for The Conservative People's Party (Det Konservative Folkeparti). At the 2015 general election she was candidate for the party in North Zealand Constituency without achieving election. On 27 June 2017 her shift from the Conservatives to Nye Borgerlige was announced. Explaining the shift she described on several occasions finding herself in opposition to her former party and its mayor Dorte Meldgaard.

=== Nye Borgerlige ===
At the 2017 local elections Thiesen was re-elected to the city council of Hillerød, this time for Nye Borgerlige, thus becoming the party's first ever and at the time only elected politician. At the 2019 general election Thiesen ran as lead candidate in North Zealand and was elected as one of the party's four first ever members of the Danish Parliament. At the 2022 general election she was re-elected for one of the party's now six seats.

=== Independent (løsgænger) ===
On 2 November, TV 2 published a recording from Nye Borgerlige's election party at Christiansborg. The recording displayed a heated argument between two or more persons culminating with one man throwing beer in the face of another. On 7 November, several media reported that the beer-throwing man had been Thiesen's boyfriend, who had violently assaulted an employee in party. The leader of Nye Borgerlige, Pernille Vermund stated that the employee had gone to the casualty department following the incident, where he had been ascertained with swelling and discoloration on the arm caused by the assault, while the boyfriend had been reported to the police.

In a press release, Pernille Vermund wrote that Thiesen had been prohibited from taking her boyfriend to Christiansborg and party events, but had repeatedly defied this. In addition, Vermund explained that in the summer of 2022 Thiesen and her boyfriend had begun "sending intimidating and threatening messages" to the employee, and that Thiesen would not apologise to the employee or take responsibility for messages but in instead wanted the employee dismissed. According to several media, the employee in question had previously been in a relationship with Thiesen. In her later resignation post, Thiesen wrote about this, "I do not apologise for anything I have not done, or to someone who has hurt me. I don't want to do that to myself, because then I'll break". On 7 November, Nye Borgerlige's main board (hovedbestyrelse) held a crisis meeting about the case. Mette Thiesen announced the same day that she had left the party as of that day.

After the meeting, the party's main board stated that Thiesen would have been expelled from the party if she had not opted out in advance and that this had been the recommendation of the parliamentary group.

With her defection Thiesen became the fastest parliamentary politician in Danish history to leave the party for which she was elected for office, having left six days after the general election.

=== Danish People's Party ===
On 12 January 2023 it was announced that Thiesen had entered into an informal arrangement with Danish People's Party on practical issues regarding parliamentary work and stayed open about joining DF with the party's group chairman Peter Kofod stating, "If Mette Thiesen wants to be a member of the Danish People's Party, she has my number. Then we'll have a talk about it, should it become relevant". On 6 February 2023 she officially joined the Danish People's Party. On 24 June, she was appointed deputy chairman of the DF's parliamentary group.

Thiesen's personal vote performance
Election	Party	Election area	Votes
2013 local elections	K	Hillerød	15
2015 general election	K	North Zealand	1.657
2017 local elections	NB	Hillerød	826
2019 general election	NB	North Zealand	4.354
2022 general election	NB	North Zealand	4.357

== Conviction ==
On 19 April 2018, Thiesen wrote a post on her Facebook profile with the heading "Terrorist sympathizer used by the Danish Broadcasting Corporation" about the fitness instructor Mahmoud Loubani. In connection with the comments, Thiesen further referred to Loubani as "a person who laughs at people who receive threats".

In January 2019, Loubani filed a lawsuit against Thiesen for the statements. On 13 December 2019, Thiesen was convicted in the Copenhagen District Court for defaming Loubani by calling him a "terrorist sympathizer". In this connection, Thiesen had to pay compensation of DKK 15,000 to Loubani as well as the costs of the case. Thiesen was acquitted of punishment, as no proceedings were brought within six months of the statements.
