= Mette Abildgaard =

Danish politician

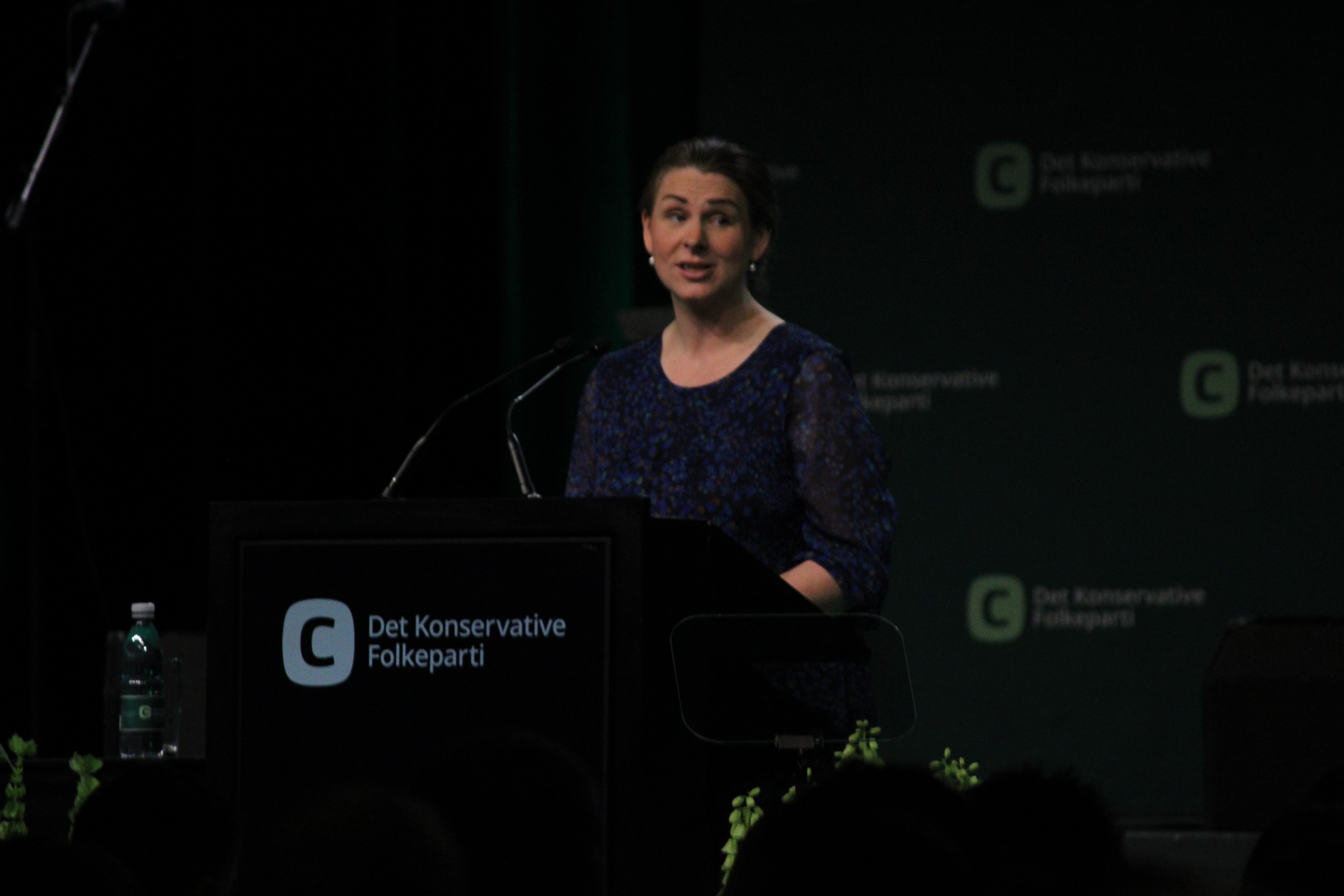
- Mette Abildgaard in 2024

Member of the Folketing
- Incumbent
- Assumed office 18 June 2015
- Constituency: North Zealand

Personal details
- Born: 12 August 1988 (age 37) Føvling, Horsens Municipality, Denmark
- Party: Conservative People's Party
- Education: Roskilde University

Mette Abildgaard Juulsager (born 12 October 1988) is a Danish politician and member of the Conservative People's Party. She has been a member of the Folketing in North Zealand greater constituency since 2015. She was chairwoman of the parliamentary group of the Conservative Party during the third cabinet of Lars Løkke Rasmussen.

== Background ==
Born in Føvling, near Horsens, Abildgaard's father was a truck driver, and her mother worked in a nursing home.

Abildgaard has a Master of Social Science from Roskilde University, where she graduated in 2013. Additionally, she has a background in PR and communications. She is married to Jens Jacob Abildgaard Juulsager.

== Political career ==
Abildgaard first ran for a political office in the 2009 European Parliament election in Denmark. She received 14,996 votes, but did not get elected. She first ran for the Folketing in the 2011 Folketing election, where she received 1,717 personal votes. This was not enough for a seat in parliament.

In the 2013 Danish local elections she ran for the regional council of the Capital Region of Denmark. With 10,262 personal votes, she gained a seat in the council. In the 2015 Folketing election Abildgaard ran and received 3,206 personal votes. This was enough to gain a seat in the Folketing and she therefore left her position in the region council. She was reelected in the 2019 Folketing election, receiving 9,101 votes.

In the 2022 Folketing election, she received 6,376 personal votes and secured her seat. Since 26 August 2024 she has however been on leave with former member of the Folketing Birgitte Bergman serving as her substitute.
