= Hækkerup =

Hækkerup is a surname. Notable people with the surname include:

- Fie Hækkerup (born 1994), Danish politician
- Hans Hækkerup (1945–2013), Danish politician
- Karen Hækkerup (born 1974), Danish politician
- Nick Hækkerup (born 1968), Danish writer and politician
- Per Hækkerup (1915–1979), Danish politician
