= Matilde Powers =

Danish politician (born 1982)

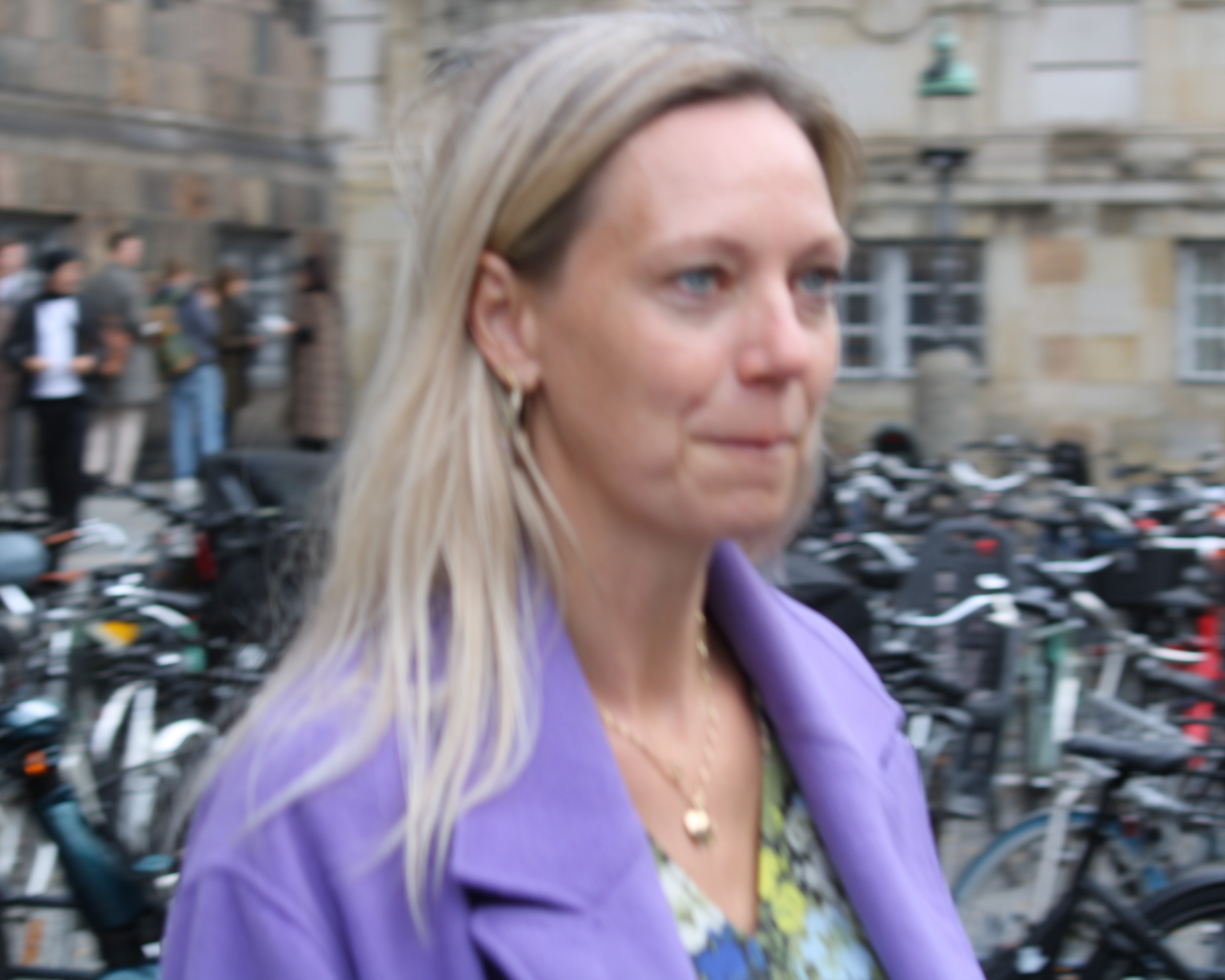
- Powers in 2025

Member of the Folketing
- Incumbent
- Assumed office 1 November 2022
- Constituency: North Zealand

Personal details
- Born: 8 April 1982 (age 44) Horsens, Denmark
- Party: Social Democrats

Matilde Hersland Powers (born 8 April 1982) is a Danish politician, who is a member of the Folketing for the Social Democrats. She was elected into the Folketing in the 2022 Danish general election.
