= Helene Liliendahl Brydensholt =

Danish politician (born 1987)

Member of the Folketing
- Incumbent
- Assumed office 1 November 2022
- Constituency: North Zealand

Personal details
- Born: 8 August 1987 (age 39) Roskilde, Denmark
- Party: The Alternative
- Education: University of Copenhagen
- Website: alleos.alternativet.dk/user/15313

Helene Liliendahl Brydensholt (born 8 August 1987) is a Danish politician and member of the Folketing, the national legislature. A member of The Alternative party, she has represented North Zealand since November 2022.

Brydensholt was born on 8 August 1987 in Roskilde. She has a degree in anthropology from the University of Copenhagen (2015). She is a communications manager for Ecouture ApS.

Brydensholt is married and has three children.

Electoral history of Helene Liliendahl Brydensholt
Election	Constituency	Party	Votes	Result
2021 local	Helsingør Municipality	The Alternative	269	Not elected
2022 general	North Zealand	The Alternative	1,183	Not elected (Note: Brydensholt entered the Folketing as one of The Alternative's compensatory seats.)
