= Trine Torp =

Danish politician (born 1970)

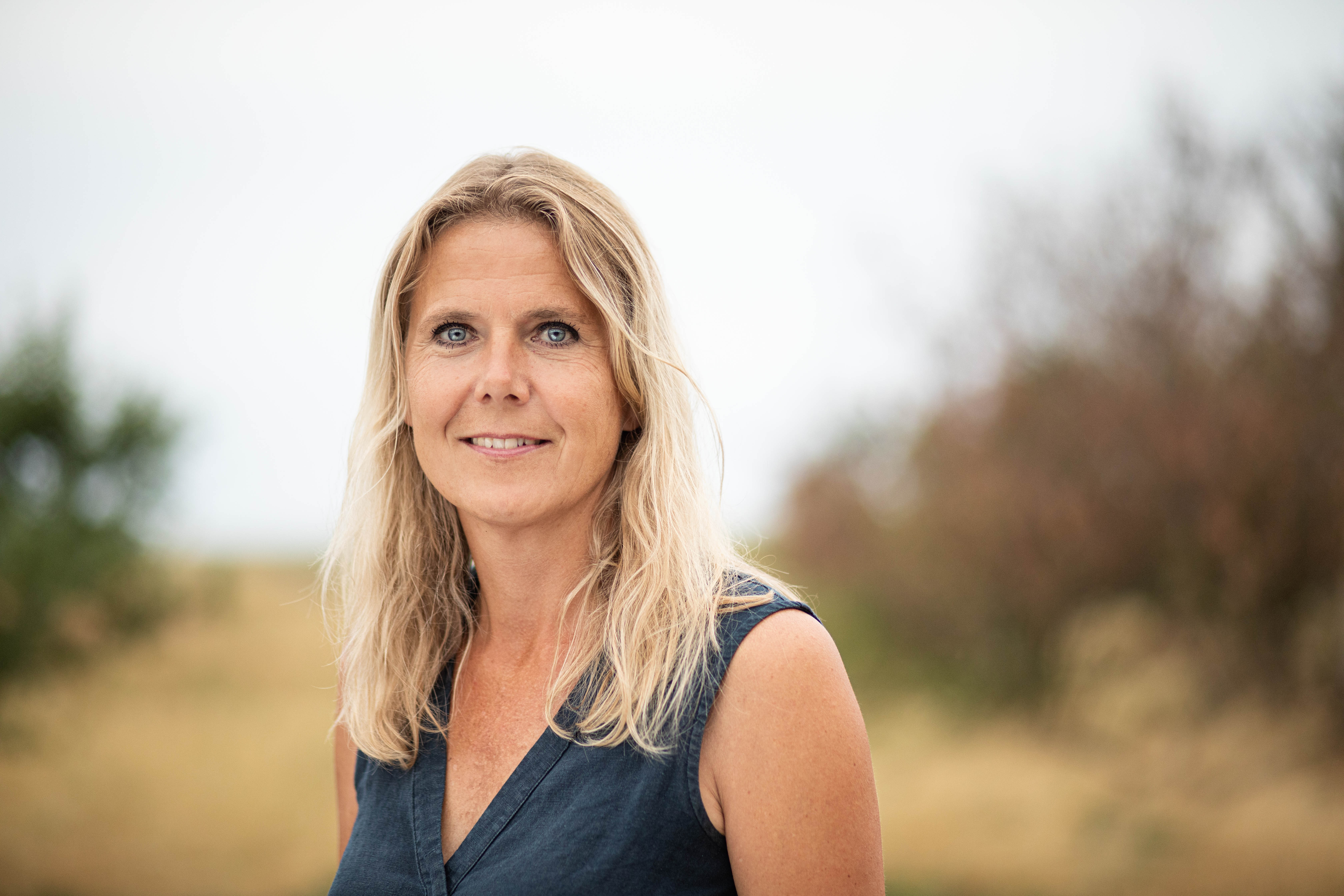
- Trine Torp, 2020

Member of the Folketing
- Incumbent
- Assumed office 18 June 2015
- Constituency: North Zealand

Personal details
- Born: 18 February 1970 (age 56) Glostrup, Denmark
- Party: Socialist People's Party

Trine Schøning Torp (born 18 February 1970 in Glostrup) is a Danish politician, who is a member of the Folketing for the Socialist People's Party. She was elected into parliament at the 2015 Danish general election.

== Political career ==
Torp was a member of the municipal council of Halsnæs Municipality from 2009 to 2015. She was first elected into parliament at the 2015 election, where she received 2,494 votes. She was reelected in 2019 with 4,307 votes.
