= Hans Andersen (politician) =

Danish politician (born 1974)

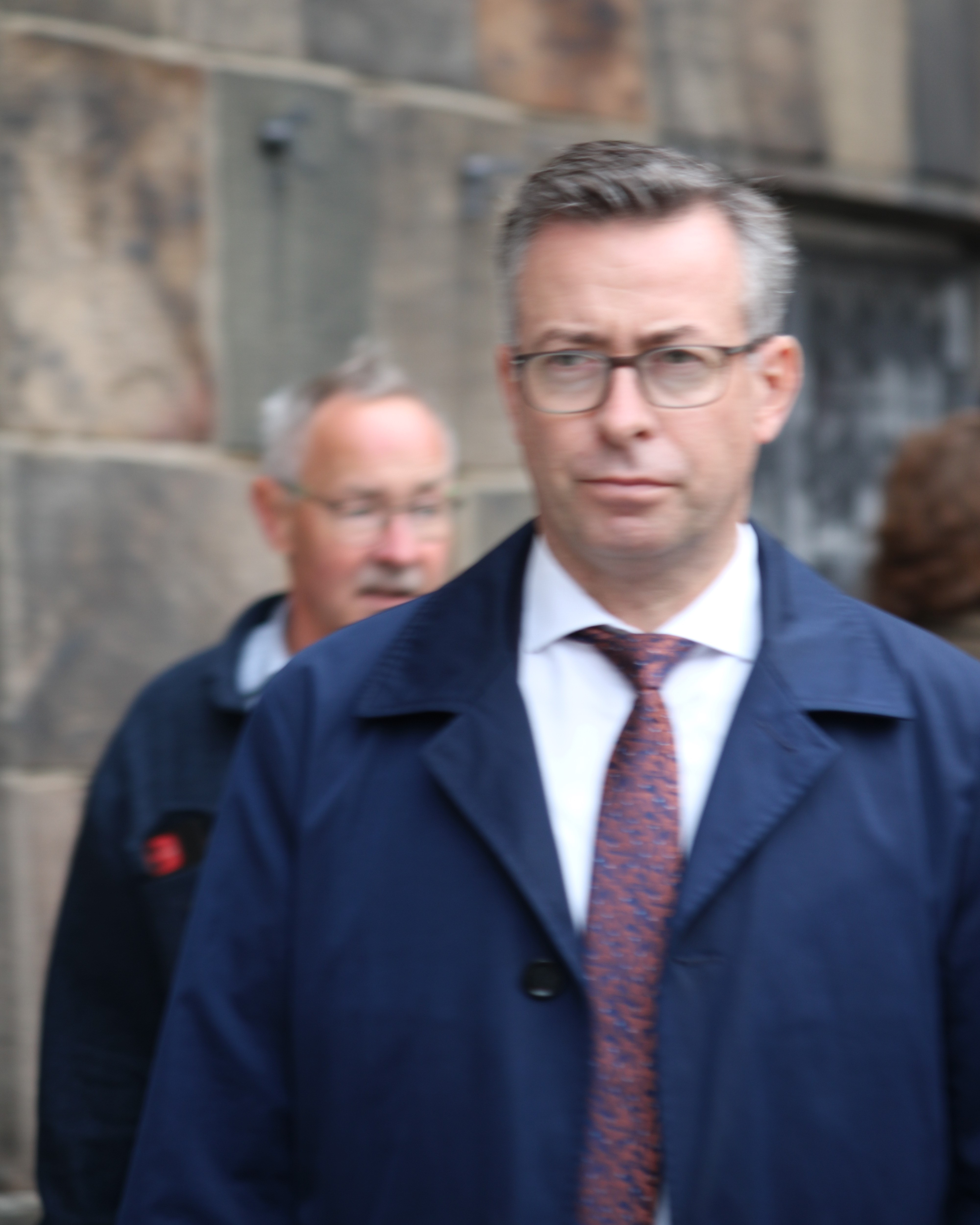
- Andersen in 2025

Member of the Folketing
- Incumbent
- Assumed office 15 September 2011
- Constituency: North Zealand
- In office 20 November 2001 – 13 November 2007
- Constituency: Frederiksborg

Personal details
- Born: Hans Nicolai Andersen; 1 November 1974 (age 51) Hillerød, Denmark
- Party: Venstre

Hans Nicolai Andersen (born 1 November 1974) is a Danish politician, who is a member of the Folketing for the Venstre political party. He was elected into parliament at the 2011 Danish general election. He was previously a member of parliament between 2001 and 2007.

== Political career ==
Andersen first ran for parliament in the 2001 Danish general election, where he was elected with 2,684 personal votes. He was reelected in the 2005 election with 2,979 personal votes. He ran again in the 2007 election, but was not reelected. He returned to parliament after the 2011 election, with 1,333 personal votes, and was reelected in 2015 with 5,447 votes and in 2019 with 7,444 votes. He was reelected again in 2022 with 4,031 votes.
