= Skævinge =

- Town
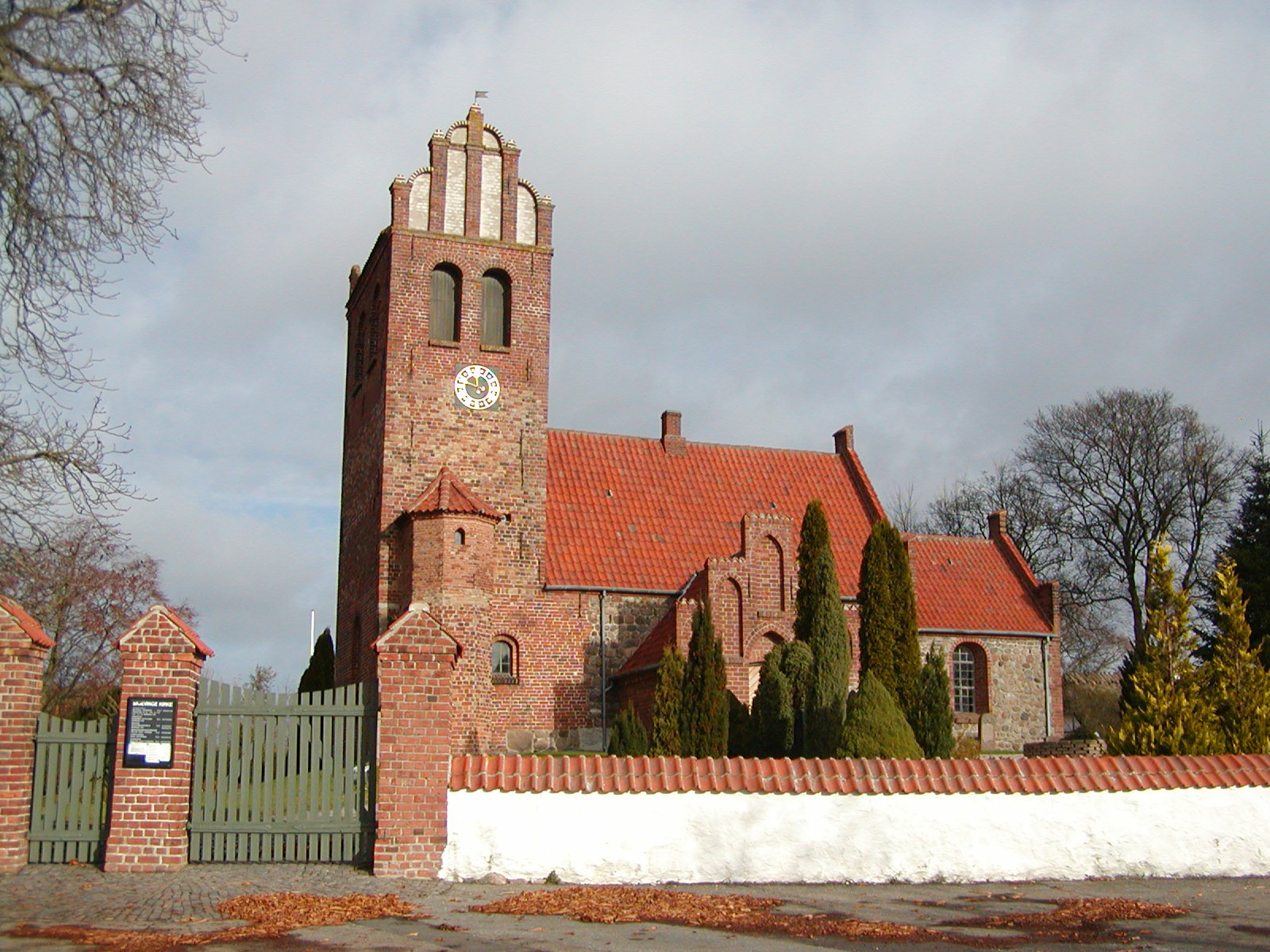
- Skævinge Church

- Location within Denmark Location within Capital Region
- Coordinates: 55°54′30″N 12°09′10″E
- Country: Denmark
- Region: Capital Region
- Municipality: Hillerød

Area
  - Urban: 1.3 km^{2} (0.50 sq mi)

Population (2026)
  - Urban: 2,964
  - Urban density: 2,300/km^{2} (5,900/sq mi)
- Time zone: UTC+1 (GMT)
- Postal code: 3320 Skævinge

Skævinge is a town with a population of 2,964 (1 January 2026) and a former municipality (Danish, kommune) in Hillerød municipality in Capital Region of Denmark in the northern part of the island of Sealand (Sjælland) in eastern Denmark. The former Skævinge municipality covered an area of 68 km^{2} (26 sq mi), and had a total population of 6,046 (2005).

On 1 January 2007 Skævinge municipality ceased to exist as the result of Kommunalreformen ("The Municipality Reform" of 2007). It was merged into existing Hillerød municipality. This created a municipality with an area of 191 km^{2} (74 sq mi) and a total population of around 43,337.

== Geography ==
Strø Bjerge, North Zealand's largest esker, is located a few kilometres to the west of Skævinge. The area includes Vibjerg and Lundebakke. Arresø, Denmark's largest lake, is located 4.5 km (2.8 mi) to the north.

== History ==
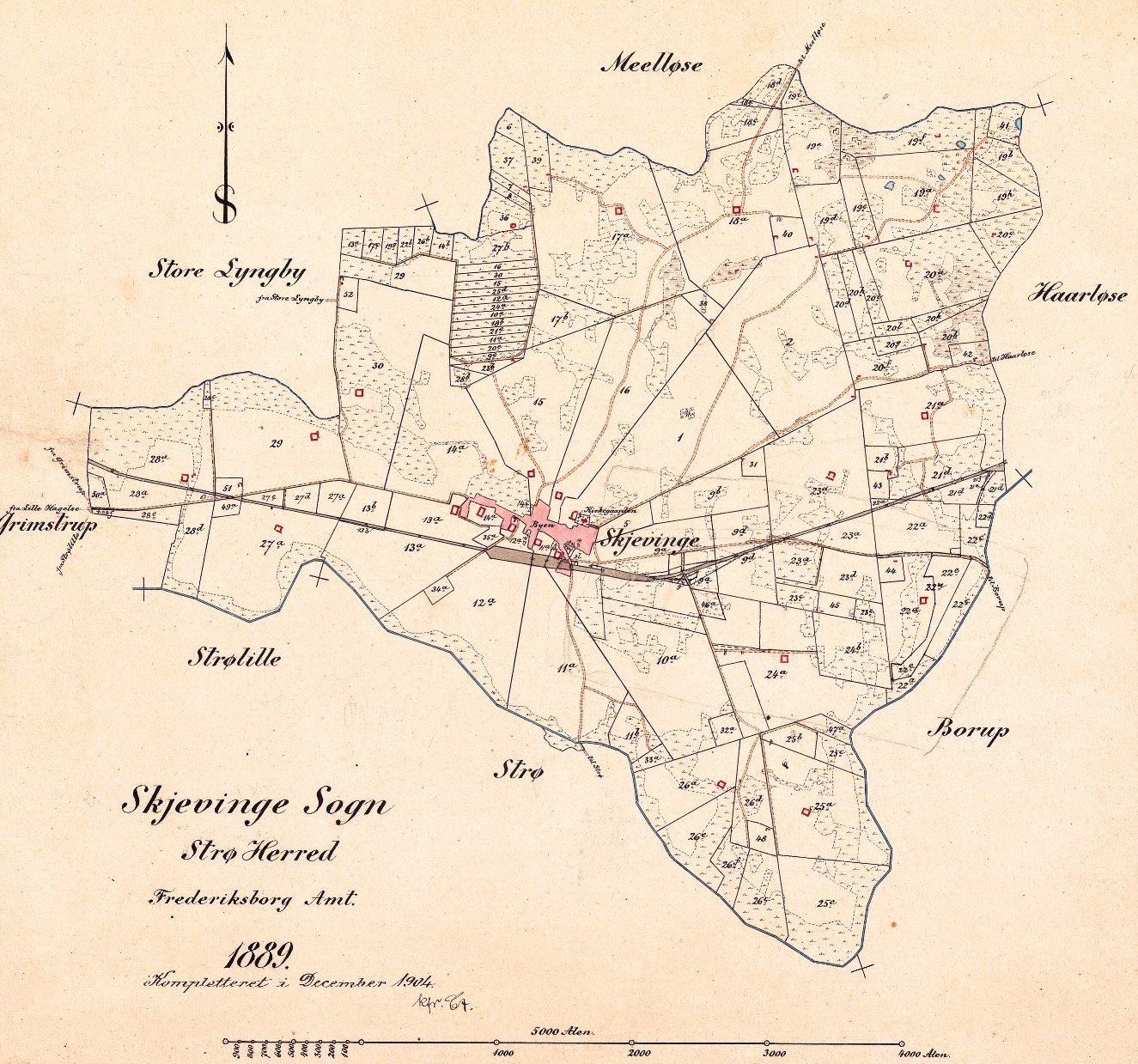
Map of the parish of Skævinge in 1889

The name is first documented in 1211–1214 as Skeping. The first part of the name may be derived from Old Danish skap , meaning "something excavated'. The suffix -inge is frequently seen in Danish toponyms.

Skævinge was a village of considerable size in the Middle Ages but later shrunk and the parishes of Skævinge and Gørløse were therefore merged. The civil parish of Skævinge-Gørlse was formed in the 1840s. The opening of the Hillerød-Frederiksværk Railway in 1897 brought new development to the town and by the 1940s Skævinge was by far the largest village in the area between Hillerød, Frederiksværk and Frederikssund.

The 1970 Danish Municipal Reform merged Skævinge-Gørløse with the civil parishes of Strø and Store Lyngby under the new Skævinge Municipality. It was incorporated in Gillerød Municipality in 2007.

== Landmarks ==
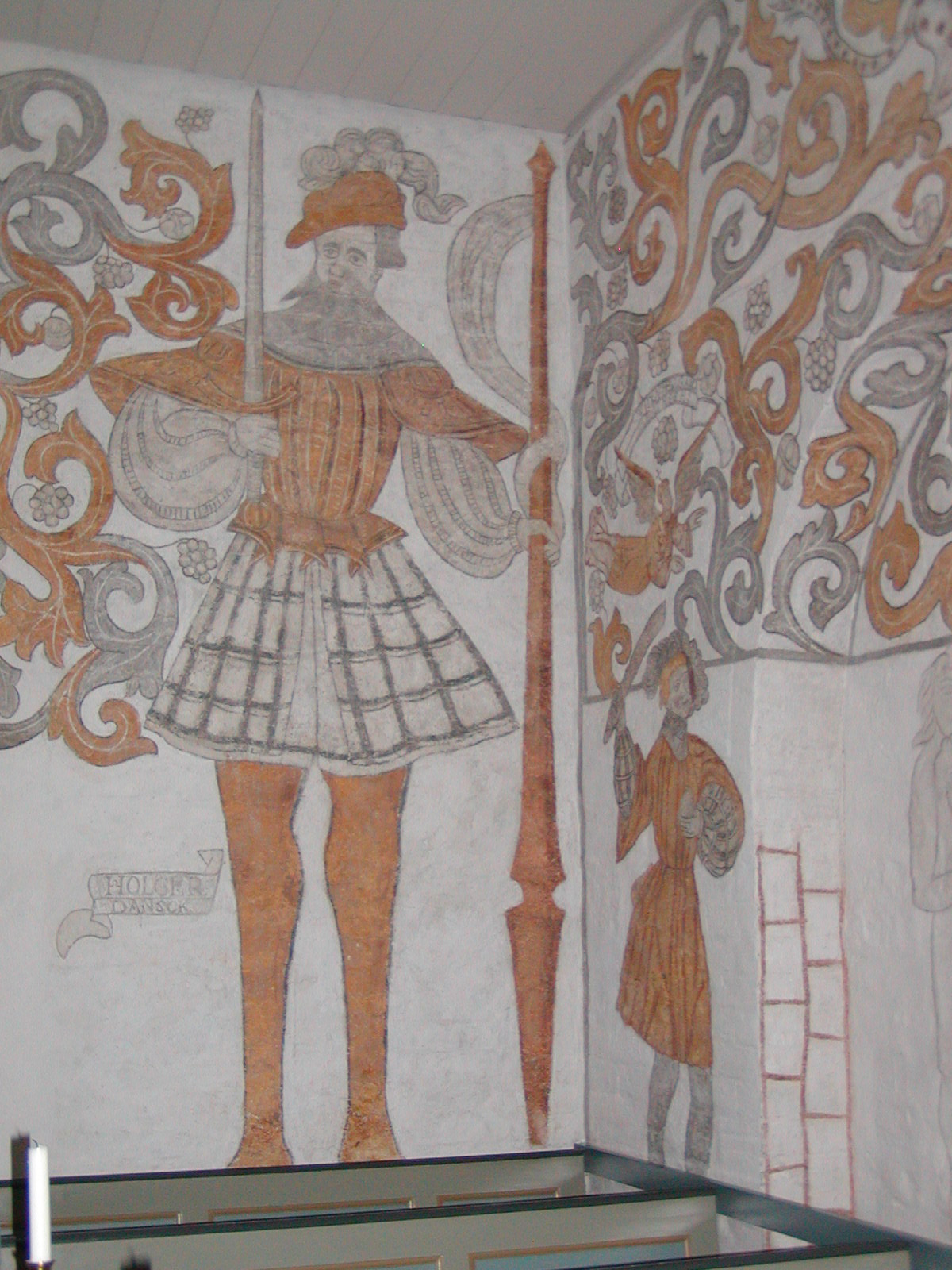
Ogier the Dane (left) on a church mural from the 16th century in Skævinge, Denmark

Skævinge Church dates from the 12th century. It is known for its large 16th-century mural of Ogier the Dane. Skævinge Rectory is from 1846–52. It consists of four detached wings with timber framing and thatched roofs and was listed in 1971. Another old village church, Strø Church, is situated about 1 kilometer to the south of Skævinge. Øllingegaard, an organic farm dairy, is located on the southeast side of town.

Kornmarkskolen is a public primary school with 709 pupils (2015). Retail stores include a SuperBrugsen and a Netto.

== Transport ==
Skævinge railway station is located on the Frederiksværk railway line between Hillerød and Hundested.

== Health Care for Older People ==
The Skaevinge Municipality set up an Integrated Home Care project in 1984. It was evaluated by the Danish Institute of Health Care in 1997. The project had two main features:

- Health care was made available to all citizens in institutions and in their own homes.
- Prevention and support to maintain and strengthen the citizens' own health and quality of life were prioritised.

Citizens were jointly involved in decision-making with staff who were given more autonomy working in small teams.

In 1997 40.8% of older people in the town assessed their own health as good in comparison with 28.9% people of the same age in 1985. The number of days people over 67 spent in hospital fell by 30%. The nursing home was closed and became a hub for community support services which included a senior center, day care, rehabilitation, 24-hour home care, and assisted living organised in three geographical teams. Nursing home staff were guaranteed jobs in the new set up. This integrated approach, pioneered in Skævinge, was widely adopted in Denmark. Nursing homes and home care organizations were no longer staffed separately. Between 1985 and 1997 the number of nursing home beds in Denmark was reduced by 30%.

== Notable people ==
- Ogier the Dane (13th century) legendary knight of Charlemagne, he appears on a 16th century mural in Skævinge church
- Jens Peter Berthelsen (1854 in Skævinge – 1934) a Danish fencer, competed at the 1900 Summer Olympics
- Tina Lund (born 1981) a Danish professional equestrian show jumper and TV celebrity, lives in Skævinge
