= Sinem Dybvad Demir =

Danish politician (born 1992)

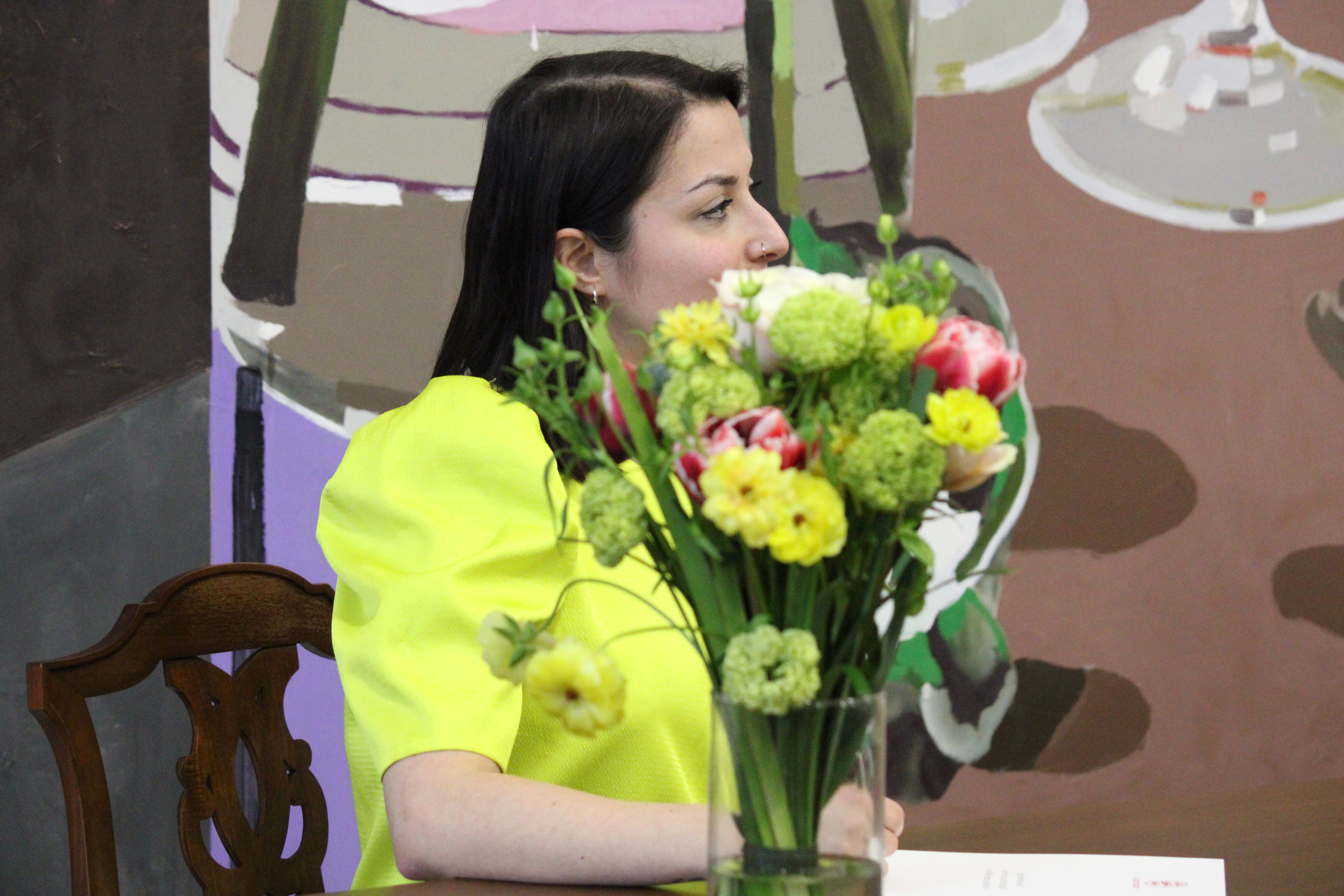

Member of the Folketing
- Incumbent
- Assumed office 24 March 2026
- Constituency: North Zealand

Personal details
- Born: Sinem Demir; 11 April 1992 (age 34) Odense, Denmark
- Party: Red–Green Alliance
- Occupation: Restaurateur

Sinem Dybvad Demir (born 11 April 1992) is a Danish politician and Member of the Folketing. A member of the Red–Green Alliance, she has represented North Zealand since March 2026.

Demir was born on 11 April 1992 in Odense. She is the daughter of Turkish immigrants and gained Danish citizenship in 2018. For more than ten years she worked as a waiter at various restaurants including Mikkeller Faergekroen at the Tivoli Gardens. Demir was a shop steward from 2018 to 2020 and has been on the board of the Copenhagen branch of the United Federation of Danish Workers (3F) since 2020. She took part in the 2020 industrial action against Jensen's Bøfhus after the restaurant reduced waiters' pay by 20kr per hour, abrogated the collective agreement it had with 3F and initiated a lockout. She and other trade union representatives were not re-hired by the restaurant following the end of the dispute.

In December 2024 Demir and her husband opened the 1899 restaurant in Copenhagen. The tabloid Ekstra Bladet has reported that almost all the food served at the restaurant serves comes from conventional farming despite 1899 claiming to use local and organic ingredients to the greatest extent possible. Demir is chair of the Hotel and Restaurant Industry Association in Copenhagen.

Demir has been a board member of the Red–Green Alliance since 2019. She was a member of the Copenhagen City Council from 2020 to 2025. She was elected to the Folketing at the 2026 general election.

Demir is married to Rune Dybvad.

Electoral history of Sinem Dybvad Demir
Election	Constituency	Party	Personal votes	Total votes	Result
2017 local	Copenhagen Municipality	Red–Green Alliance	525		Not elected
2019 general	North Jutland	Red–Green Alliance	1,248	3,626	Not elected
2021 local	Copenhagen Municipality	Red–Green Alliance	3,480		Elected
2022 general	North Zealand	Red–Green Alliance	1,615	3,460	Not elected
2026 general	North Zealand	Red–Green Alliance	1,318	3,346	Elected
