= Pia Adelsteen =

Danish politician

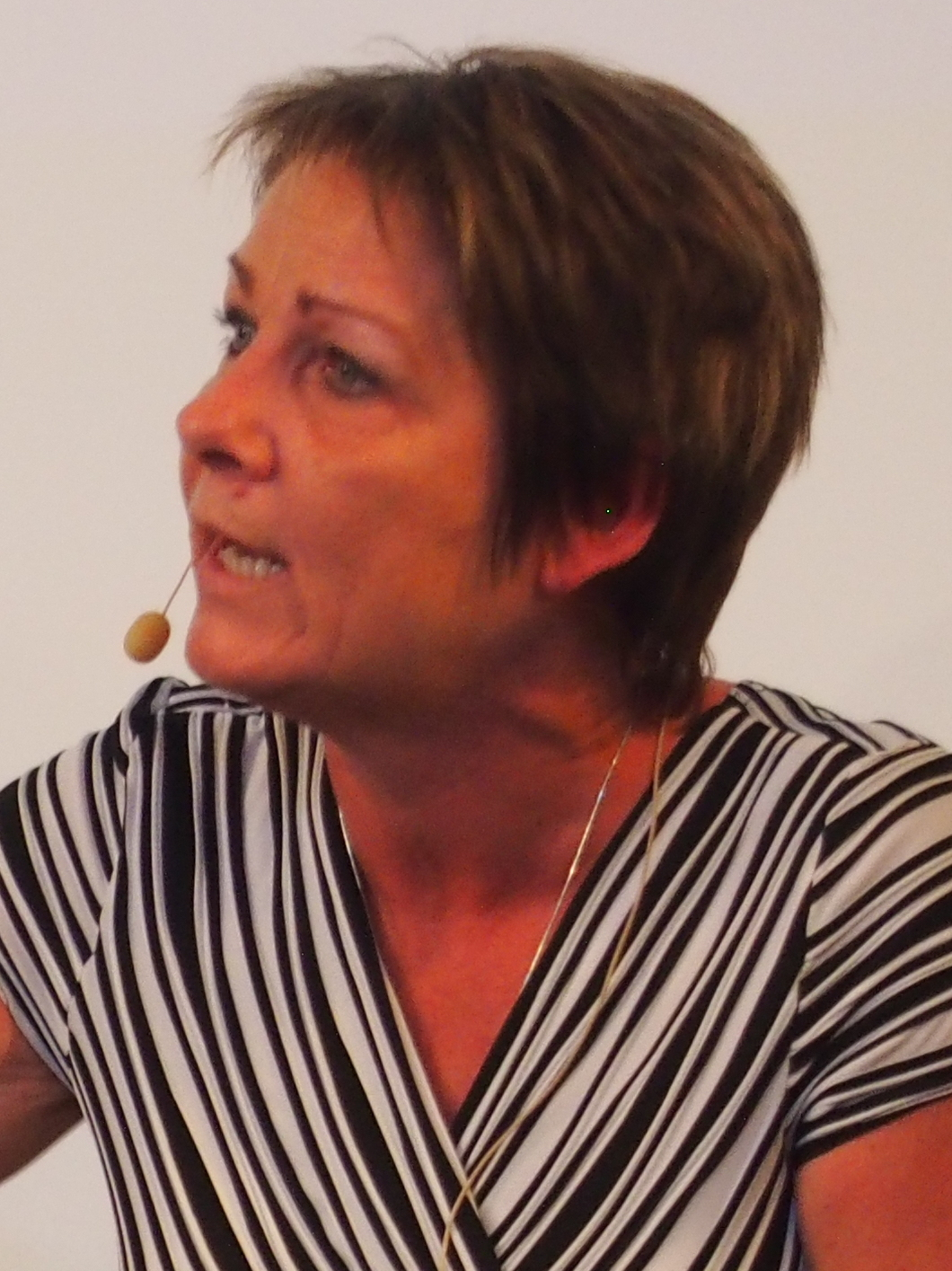
- Pia Adelsteen in 2014

Member of the Folketing
- In office 13 November 2007 – 5 June 2019
- Constituency: North Zealand

Personal details
- Born: 11 September 1963 (age 62) Korsør, Denmark
- Party: Danish People's Party

Pia Adelsteen (born 11 September 1963 in Korsør) is a Danish politician, who was a member of the Folketing from 2007 to 2019. She was first elected into parliament at the 2007 Danish general election.

== Political career ==
Adelsteen was a member of the municipal councils of Slangerup Municipality from 2002 to 2006, Frederikssund Municipality from 2006 to 2014 and Mariagerfjord Municipality since 2018. She was elected into parliament at the 2007 election was reelected in 2011 and 2015. She didn't run for reelection in the 2019 election, instead choosing to run in the 2019 European Parliament election, though not managing to get elected.
