= Rudersdal (nomination district) =

- Rudersdal
- Nomination district constituency for the Folketing
- Location of Rudersdal within North Zealand

- Location of North Zealand within Denmark
- Municipalities: Allerød; Rudersdal
- Constituency: North Zealand
- Electorate: 58,285 (2022)

Current constituency
- Created: 2007

Rudersdal nominating district is one of the 92 nominating districts that was created for Danish elections following the 2007 municipal reform. It consists of Allerød and Rudersdal municipality.

In general elections, the district is a strong area for parties commonly associated with the blue bloc.

== General elections results ==
=== General elections in the 2020s ===
2022 Danish general election

Parties	Vote		
Parties	Votes	%	+ / -
Venstre	9,477	18.18	-7.30
Social Democrats	8,461	16.23	+1.59
Liberal Alliance	6,551	12.57	+7.86
Moderates	6,501	12.47	New
Conservatives	5,893	11.31	-5.15
Social Liberals	4,097	7.86	-7.98
Green Left	3,756	7.21	+1.33
Red–Green Alliance	1,910	3.66	-1.02
The Alternative	1,707	3.28	+0.44
New Right	1,334	2.56	-0.05
Denmark Democrats	1,300	2.49	New
Danish People's Party	804	1.54	-2.77
Independent Greens	187	0.36	New
Christian Democrats	102	0.20	-0.59
Jayseth Lotus Arrose Simoysano	20	0.04	New
Katjalivah Elleyhansen	19	0.04	New
Total	52,119		

=== General elections in the 2010s ===
2019 Danish general election

Parties	Vote		
Parties	Votes	%	+ / -
Venstre	13,193	25.48	+2.37
Conservatives	8,523	16.46	+8.89
Social Liberals	8,200	15.84	+6.80
Social Democrats	7,580	14.64	-3.49
Green Left	3,043	5.88	+2.52
Liberal Alliance	2,441	4.71	-12.22
Red–Green Alliance	2,422	4.68	-0.17
Danish People's Party	2,233	4.31	-7.84
The Alternative	1,473	2.84	-1.64
New Right	1,354	2.61	New
Stram Kurs	452	0.87	New
Klaus Riskær Pedersen Party	411	0.79	New
Christian Democrats	409	0.79	+0.44
Gert Lassen	49	0.09	+0.06
Hans Frederik Brobjerg	1	0.00	New
Total	51,784		

2015 Danish general election

Parties	Vote		
Parties	Votes	%	+ / -
Venstre	11,789	23.11	-12.12
Social Democrats	9,251	18.13	+5.32
Liberal Alliance	8,637	16.93	+6.91
Danish People's Party	6,197	12.15	+5.20
Social Liberals	4,614	9.04	-5.97
Conservatives	3,862	7.57	-1.94
Red–Green Alliance	2,475	4.85	+0.60
The Alternative	2,284	4.48	New
Green Left	1,713	3.36	-2.56
Christian Democrats	177	0.35	+0.10
Gert Lassen	14	0.03	New
Aleks Jensen	2	0.00	New
Total	51,015		

2011 Danish general election

Parties	Vote		
Parties	Votes	%	+ / -
Venstre	17,895	35.23	+2.72
Social Liberals	7,624	15.01	+5.23
Social Democrats	6,508	12.81	-1.56
Liberal Alliance	5,091	10.02	+4.42
Conservatives	4,831	9.51	-8.30
Danish People's Party	3,528	6.95	-1.44
Green Left	3,007	5.92	-3.35
Red–Green Alliance	2,161	4.25	+2.36
Christian Democrats	127	0.25	-0.12
Bjarne Holm	22	0.04	New
Total	50,794		

=== General elections in the 2000s ===
2007 Danish general election

Parties	Vote		
Parties	Votes	%	+ / -
Venstre	16,100	32.51	
Conservatives	8,821	17.81	
Social Democrats	7,118	14.37	
Social Liberals	4,842	9.78	
Green Left	4,591	9.27	
Danish People's Party	4,156	8.39	
New Alliance	2,775	5.60	
Red–Green Alliance	937	1.89	
Christian Democrats	185	0.37	
Total	49,525		

== European Parliament elections results ==
2024 European Parliament election in Denmark

Parties	Vote		
Parties	Votes	%	+ / -
Venstre	7,656	18.11	-8.75
Green Left	6,478	15.33	+3.94
Conservatives	6,037	14.28	-0.05
Social Liberals	4,736	11.20	-5.27
Liberal Alliance	4,452	10.53	+7.19
Social Democrats	4,272	10.11	-2.90
Moderates	3,663	8.67	New
Red–Green Alliance	1,781	4.21	+0.92
Danish People's Party	1,521	3.60	-2.71
The Alternative	873	2.07	-0.68
Denmark Democrats	801	1.89	New
Total	42,270		

2019 European Parliament election in Denmark

Parties	Vote		
Parties	Votes	%	+ / -
Venstre	12,141	26.86	+5.55
Social Liberals	7,445	16.47	+5.02
Conservatives	6,477	14.33	-0.99
Social Democrats	5,881	13.01	-0.83
Green Left	5,151	11.39	+1.62
Danish People's Party	2,854	6.31	-11.46
Liberal Alliance	1,508	3.34	-2.40
Red–Green Alliance	1,487	3.29	New
The Alternative	1,244	2.75	New
People's Movement against the EU	1,018	2.25	-2.56
Total	45,206		

2014 European Parliament election in Denmark

Parties	Vote		
Parties	Votes	%	+ / -
Venstre	8,152	21.31	-6.81
Danish People's Party	6,799	17.77	+6.46
Conservatives	5,861	15.32	-2.06
Social Democrats	5,296	13.84	-0.32
Social Liberals	4,381	11.45	+4.09
Green Left	3,739	9.77	-3.34
Liberal Alliance	2,195	5.74	+4.79
People's Movement against the EU	1,839	4.81	-0.78
Total	38,262		

2009 European Parliament election in Denmark

Parties	Vote		
Parties	Votes	%	+ / -
Venstre	10,871	28.12	
Conservatives	6,720	17.38	
Social Democrats	5,472	14.16	
Green Left	5,066	13.11	
Danish People's Party	4,373	11.31	
Social Liberals	2,847	7.36	
People's Movement against the EU	2,160	5.59	
June Movement	780	2.02	
Liberal Alliance	367	0.95	
Total	38,656		

== Referendums ==
2022 Danish European Union opt-out referendum

Option	Votes	%
✓ YES	35,422	79.99
X NO	8,859	20.01

2015 Danish European Union opt-out referendum

Option	Votes	%
✓ YES	28,470	64.05
X NO	15,978	35.95

2014 Danish Unified Patent Court membership referendum

Option	Votes	%
✓ YES	28,067	74.85
X NO	9,433	25.15

2009 Danish Act of Succession referendum

Option	Votes	%
✓ YES	30,423	87.40
X NO	4,387	12.60
