= Egedal (nomination district) =

Nominating district in Denmark

- Egedal
- Nomination district constituency for the Folketing
- Location of Egedal within North Zealand

- Location of North Zealand within Denmark
- Municipalities: Egedal; Furesø
- Constituency: North Zealand
- Electorate: 60,393 (2022)

Current constituency
- Created: 2007

Egedal nominating district is one of the 92 nominating districts that was created for Danish elections following the 2007 municipal reform. It consists of Egedal and Furesø municipality.

In general elections, the district tends to vote close to the national result when looking at the voter split between the two blocs.

== General elections results ==
=== General elections in the 2020s ===
2022 Danish general election

| Parties | Vote | | |
| Parties | Votes | % | + / - |
|---|---|---|---|
| Social Democrats | 13,564 | 25.66 | +3.29 |
| Venstre | 7,853 | 14.86 | -8.20 |
| Moderates | 6,159 | 11.65 | New |
| Liberal Alliance | 4,584 | 8.67 | +5.42 |
| Green Left | 4,581 | 8.67 | +1.12 |
| Conservatives | 3,777 | 7.15 | -3.34 |
| Social Liberals | 2,865 | 5.42 | -7.04 |
| Red–Green Alliance | 2,326 | 4.40 | -1.17 |
| Denmark Democrats | 2,125 | 4.02 | New |
| The Alternative | 1,655 | 3.13 | +0.52 |
| New Right | 1,591 | 3.01 | +0.32 |
| Danish People's Party | 1,321 | 2.50 | -4.40 |
| Independent Greens | 305 | 0.58 | New |
| Christian Democrats | 113 | 0.21 | -0.65 |
| Jayseth Lotus Arrose Simoysano | 28 | 0.05 | New |
| Katjalivah Elleyhansen | 13 | 0.02 | New |
| Total | 52,860 | | |

=== General elections in the 2010s ===
2019 Danish general election

| Parties | Vote | | |
| Parties | Votes | % | + / - |
|---|---|---|---|
| Venstre | 12,063 | 23.06 | +2.52 |
| Social Democrats | 11,701 | 22.37 | -2.21 |
| Social Liberals | 6,516 | 12.46 | +5.47 |
| Conservatives | 5,486 | 10.49 | +5.75 |
| Green Left | 3,948 | 7.55 | +3.72 |
| Danish People's Party | 3,607 | 6.90 | -10.60 |
| Red–Green Alliance | 2,912 | 5.57 | -0.53 |
| Liberal Alliance | 1,699 | 3.25 | -7.83 |
| New Right | 1,407 | 2.69 | New |
| The Alternative | 1,365 | 2.61 | -1.65 |
| Stram Kurs | 653 | 1.25 | New |
| Klaus Riskær Pedersen Party | 459 | 0.88 | New |
| Christian Democrats | 450 | 0.86 | +0.51 |
| Gert Lassen | 30 | 0.06 | +0.05 |
| Hans Frederik Brobjerg | 5 | 0.01 | New |
| Total | 52,301 | | |

2015 Danish general election

| Parties | Vote | | |
| Parties | Votes | % | + / - |
|---|---|---|---|
| Social Democrats | 12,701 | 24.58 | +4.87 |
| Venstre | 10,613 | 20.54 | -9.99 |
| Danish People's Party | 9,041 | 17.50 | +7.45 |
| Liberal Alliance | 5,724 | 11.08 | +3.80 |
| Social Liberals | 3,613 | 6.99 | -6.11 |
| Red–Green Alliance | 3,153 | 6.10 | +0.92 |
| Conservatives | 2,447 | 4.74 | -2.06 |
| The Alternative | 2,199 | 4.26 | New |
| Green Left | 1,977 | 3.83 | -3.25 |
| Christian Democrats | 182 | 0.35 | +0.10 |
| Aleks Jensen | 15 | 0.03 | New |
| Gert Lassen | 5 | 0.01 | New |
| Total | 51,670 | | |

2011 Danish general election

| Parties | Vote | | |
| Parties | Votes | % | + / - |
|---|---|---|---|
| Venstre | 15,618 | 30.53 | +3.53 |
| Social Democrats | 10,082 | 19.71 | -0.72 |
| Social Liberals | 6,701 | 13.10 | +5.55 |
| Danish People's Party | 5,143 | 10.05 | -1.98 |
| Liberal Alliance | 3,725 | 7.28 | +2.79 |
| Green Left | 3,623 | 7.08 | -4.30 |
| Conservatives | 3,478 | 6.80 | -7.96 |
| Red–Green Alliance | 2,649 | 5.18 | +3.18 |
| Christian Democrats | 127 | 0.25 | -0.11 |
| Bjarne Holm | 14 | 0.03 | New |
| Total | 51,160 | | |

=== General elections in the 2000s ===
2007 Danish general election

| Parties | Vote | | |
| Parties | Votes | % | + / - |
|---|---|---|---|
| Venstre | 13,420 | 27.00 | |
| Social Democrats | 10,154 | 20.43 | |
| Conservatives | 7,335 | 14.76 | |
| Danish People's Party | 5,979 | 12.03 | |
| Green Left | 5,654 | 11.38 | |
| Social Liberals | 3,752 | 7.55 | |
| New Alliance | 2,231 | 4.49 | |
| Red–Green Alliance | 993 | 2.00 | |
| Christian Democrats | 181 | 0.36 | |
| Total | 49,699 | | |

== European Parliament elections results ==
2024 European Parliament election in Denmark

| Parties | Vote | | |
| Parties | Votes | % | + / - |
|---|---|---|---|
| Green Left | 7,644 | 18.97 | +5.73 |
| Venstre | 5,877 | 14.59 | -8.15 |
| Social Democrats | 5,676 | 14.09 | -5.36 |
| Conservatives | 4,513 | 11.20 | +2.35 |
| Social Liberals | 3,869 | 9.60 | -3.87 |
| Moderates | 3,159 | 7.84 | New |
| Liberal Alliance | 3,029 | 7.52 | +4.91 |
| Danish People's Party | 2,211 | 5.49 | -3.97 |
| Red–Green Alliance | 2,135 | 5.30 | +0.98 |
| Denmark Democrats | 1,290 | 3.20 | New |
| The Alternative | 885 | 2.20 | -0.66 |
| Total | 40,288 | | |

2019 European Parliament election in Denmark

| Parties | Vote | | |
| Parties | Votes | % | + / - |
|---|---|---|---|
| Venstre | 9,922 | 22.74 | +5.61 |
| Social Democrats | 8,486 | 19.45 | +2.09 |
| Social Liberals | 5,877 | 13.47 | +3.92 |
| Green Left | 5,776 | 13.24 | +2.20 |
| Danish People's Party | 4,126 | 9.46 | -14.69 |
| Conservatives | 3,863 | 8.85 | -1.66 |
| Red–Green Alliance | 1,885 | 4.32 | New |
| People's Movement against the EU | 1,315 | 3.01 | -3.26 |
| The Alternative | 1,247 | 2.86 | New |
| Liberal Alliance | 1,138 | 2.61 | -1.38 |
| Total | 43,635 | | |

2014 European Parliament election in Denmark

| Parties | Vote | | |
| Parties | Votes | % | + / - |
|---|---|---|---|
| Danish People's Party | 8,910 | 24.15 | +9.45 |
| Social Democrats | 6,405 | 17.36 | -0.43 |
| Venstre | 6,321 | 17.13 | -4.36 |
| Green Left | 4,074 | 11.04 | -5.00 |
| Conservatives | 3,879 | 10.51 | -3.35 |
| Social Liberals | 3,524 | 9.55 | +3.48 |
| People's Movement against the EU | 2,314 | 6.27 | -0.73 |
| Liberal Alliance | 1,474 | 3.99 | +3.18 |
| Total | 36,901 | | |

2009 European Parliament election in Denmark

| Parties | Vote | | |
| Parties | Votes | % | + / - |
|---|---|---|---|
| Venstre | 8,007 | 21.49 | |
| Social Democrats | 6,627 | 17.79 | |
| Green Left | 5,975 | 16.04 | |
| Danish People's Party | 5,475 | 14.70 | |
| Conservatives | 5,163 | 13.86 | |
| People's Movement against the EU | 2,606 | 7.00 | |
| Social Liberals | 2,261 | 6.07 | |
| June Movement | 838 | 2.25 | |
| Liberal Alliance | 301 | 0.81 | |
| Total | 37,253 | | |

== Referendums ==
2022 Danish European Union opt-out referendum

| Option | Votes | % |
|---|---|---|
| ✓ YES | 32,324 | 73.68 |
| X NO | 11,547 | 26.32 |

2015 Danish European Union opt-out referendum

| Option | Votes | % |
|---|---|---|
| ✓ YES | 24,756 | 55.13 |
| X NO | 20,150 | 44.87 |

2014 Danish Unified Patent Court membership referendum

| Option | Votes | % |
|---|---|---|
| ✓ YES | 24,963 | 69.28 |
| X NO | 11,068 | 30.72 |

2009 Danish Act of Succession referendum

| Option | Votes | % |
|---|---|---|
| ✓ YES | 29,504 | 86.77 |
| X NO | 4,500 | 13.23 |
