= Steffen Frølund =

Danish politician

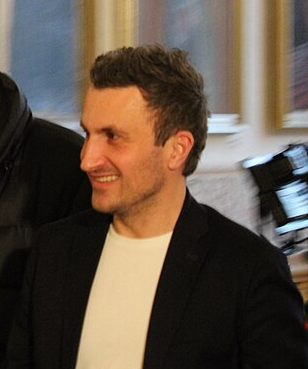
- Frølund in 2025

Member of the Folketing
- Incumbent
- Assumed office 1 November 2022
- Constituency: North Zealand

Personal details
- Born: 15 July 1984 (age 42) Denmark
- Party: Liberal Alliance
- Education: Copenhagen Business School

Steffen W. Frølund (born 15 July 1984) is a Danish politician, who is a member of the Folketing for the Liberal Alliance. He was elected into the Folketing in the 2022 Danish general election.
