= Frederikssund (nomination district) =

- Frederikssund
- Nomination district constituency for the Folketing
- Location of Frederikssund within North Zealand

- Location of North Zealand within Denmark
- Municipalities: Frederikssund; Halsnæs
- Constituency: North Zealand
- Electorate: 58,894 (2022)

Current constituency
- Created: 1849 (as constituency); 2007 (as nomination district)

Frederikssund nominating district is one of the 92 nominating districts that was created for Danish elections following the 2007 municipal reform. It consists of Frederikssund and Halsnæs municipality. It was created in 1849 as a constituency and existed until 1915. In 2007 it was reestablished as a nomination district.

In general elections, the district tends to vote close to the national result when looking at the voter split between the two blocs.

== General elections results ==
=== General elections in the 2020s ===
2022 Danish general election

Parties	Vote		
Parties	Votes	%	+ / -
Social Democrats	15,068	31.06	+3.71
Venstre	6,391	13.17	-10.22
Moderates	4,735	9.76	New
Green Left	3,871	7.98	-0.02
Denmark Democrats	3,571	7.36	New
Liberal Alliance	3,145	6.48	+4.60
New Right	2,596	5.35	+1.51
Conservatives	2,234	4.61	-1.64
Red–Green Alliance	2,128	4.39	-1.49
Danish People's Party	1,987	4.10	-6.94
The Alternative	1,371	2.83	+0.61
Social Liberals	1,118	2.30	-3.82
Independent Greens	139	0.29	New
Christian Democrats	113	0.23	-0.61
Jayseth Lotus Arrose Simoysano	30	0.06	New
Katjalivah Elleyhansen	14	0.03	New
Total	48,511		

=== General elections in the 2010s ===
2019 Danish general election

Parties	Vote		
Parties	Votes	%	+ / -
Social Democrats	13,198	27.35	+0.85
Venstre	11,289	23.39	+3.75
Danish People's Party	5,326	11.04	-13.96
Green Left	3,862	8.00	+3.27
Conservatives	3,016	6.25	+3.53
Social Liberals	2,954	6.12	+2.98
Red–Green Alliance	2,840	5.88	-1.41
New Right	1,852	3.84	New
The Alternative	1,070	2.22	-1.76
Stram Kurs	961	1.99	New
Liberal Alliance	906	1.88	-4.65
Klaus Riskær Pedersen Party	536	1.11	New
Christian Democrats	407	0.84	+0.43
Gert Lassen	41	0.08	+0.07
Hans Frederik Brobjerg	3	0.01	New
Total	48,261		

2015 Danish general election

Parties	Vote		
Parties	Votes	%	+ / -
Social Democrats	12,770	26.50	+2.80
Danish People's Party	12,048	25.00	+10.85
Venstre	9,466	19.64	-10.27
Red–Green Alliance	3,514	7.29	+1.31
Liberal Alliance	3,149	6.53	+1.52
Green Left	2,279	4.73	-4.24
The Alternative	1,920	3.98	New
Social Liberals	1,511	3.14	-4.87
Conservatives	1,313	2.72	-1.12
Christian Democrats	197	0.41	+0.01
Aleks Jensen	20	0.04	New
Gert Lassen	3	0.01	New
Total	48,190		

2011 Danish general election

Parties	Vote		
Parties	Votes	%	+ / -
Venstre	14,555	29.91	+3.80
Social Democrats	11,530	23.70	-2.14
Danish People's Party	6,884	14.15	-2.67
Green Left	4,363	8.97	-2.75
Social Liberals	3,900	8.01	+3.17
Red–Green Alliance	2,910	5.98	+4.16
Liberal Alliance	2,439	5.01	+2.00
Conservatives	1,868	3.84	-5.55
Christian Democrats	195	0.40	-0.07
Bjarne Holm	16	0.03	New
Total	48,660		

=== General elections in the 2000s ===
2007 Danish general election

Parties	Vote		
Parties	Votes	%	+ / -
Venstre	12,406	26.11	
Social Democrats	12,279	25.84	
Danish People's Party	7,990	16.82	
Green Left	5,567	11.72	
Conservatives	4,462	9.39	
Social Liberals	2,298	4.84	
New Alliance	1,429	3.01	
Red–Green Alliance	863	1.82	
Christian Democrats	221	0.47	
Total	47,515		

== European Parliament elections results ==
2024 European Parliament election in Denmark

Parties	Vote		
Parties	Votes	%	+ / -
Green Left	5,872	18.08	+5.11
Social Democrats	5,425	16.70	-6.34
Venstre	4,477	13.79	-7.82
Danish People's Party	3,158	9.72	-4.97
Moderates	2,414	7.43	New
Conservatives	2,366	7.29	+1.69
Liberal Alliance	2,245	6.91	+5.10
Denmark Democrats	2,060	6.34	New
Red–Green Alliance	2,007	6.18	+0.93
Social Liberals	1,684	5.19	-2.73
The Alternative	769	2.37	-0.19
Total	32,477		

2019 European Parliament election in Denmark

Parties	Vote		
Parties	Votes	%	+ / -
Venstre	9,922	22.74	+5.61
Social Democrats	8,486	19.45	+2.09
Social Liberals	5,877	13.47	+3.92
Green Left	5,776	13.24	+2.20
Danish People's Party	4,126	9.46	-14.69
Conservatives	3,863	8.85	-1.66
Red–Green Alliance	1,885	4.32	New
People's Movement against the EU	1,315	3.01	-3.26
The Alternative	1,247	2.86	New
Liberal Alliance	1,138	2.61	-1.38
Total	43,635		

2014 European Parliament election in Denmark

Parties	Vote		
Parties	Votes	%	+ / -
Danish People's Party	8,910	24.15	+9.45
Social Democrats	6,405	17.36	-0.43
Venstre	6,321	17.13	-4.36
Green Left	4,074	11.04	-5.00
Conservatives	3,879	10.51	-3.35
Social Liberals	3,524	9.55	+3.48
People's Movement against the EU	2,314	6.27	-0.73
Liberal Alliance	1,474	3.99	+3.18
Total	36,901		

2009 European Parliament election in Denmark

Parties	Vote		
Parties	Votes	%	+ / -
Venstre	8,007	21.49	
Social Democrats	6,627	17.79	
Green Left	5,975	16.04	
Danish People's Party	5,475	14.70	
Conservatives	5,163	13.86	
People's Movement against the EU	2,606	7.00	
Social Liberals	2,261	6.07	
June Movement	838	2.25	
Liberal Alliance	301	0.81	
Total	37,253		

== Referendums ==
2022 Danish European Union opt-out referendum

Option	Votes	%
✓ YES	24,668	63.37
X NO	14,262	36.63

2015 Danish European Union opt-out referendum

Option	Votes	%
X NO	23,404	57.37
✓ YES	17,394	42.63

2014 Danish Unified Patent Court membership referendum

Option	Votes	%
✓ YES	17,936	59.35
X NO	12,283	40.65

2009 Danish Act of Succession referendum

Option	Votes	%
✓ YES	24,996	84.53
X NO	4,575	15.47
