= Marianne Bigum =

Danish politician (born 1983)

Member of the Folketing
- Incumbent
- Assumed office 1 November 2022
- Constituency: North Zealand

Personal details
- Born: 10 April 1983 (age 43)
- Party: Green Left
- Education: Technical University of Denmark
- Website: mariannebigum.nu

Marianne Bigum (born 10 April 1983) is a Danish politician and member of the Folketing, the national legislature. A member of the Green Left party, she has represented North Zealand since November 2022.

Bigum was born on 10 April 1983. She is daughter of butcher Tommy Bigum. She studied at Rungsted Skole (1995–1999) and Helsingør Gymnasium. She has a Bachelor of Science degree in chemistry (2007), a Master of Science degree in environmental engineering (2009) and a Doctor of Philosophy degree (2014) from the Technical University of Denmark. She was a consultant on Copenhagen Municipality's Plastic Zero project (2013–2014), technical specialist at the Environmental Protection Agency (Miljøstyrelsen) (2014–2018) and senior consultant at Ramboll (2018–2021). She was a team leader and expert on circular economy at the Asian Development Bank from 2020 to 2022. Se was a member of the municipal council in Rudersdal Municipality from 2009 to 2012.

Bigum's partner is Jacob Kragh Andersen and she has three children.

Electoral history of Marianne Bigum
Election	Constituency	Party	Votes	Result
2009 local	Rudersdal Municipality	Socialist People's Party	194	Elected
2019 general	Greater Copenhagen	Socialist People's Party	1,766	Not elected
2022 general	North Zealand	Green Left	2,823	Elected
2026 general	North Zealand	Green Left	2,384	Not elected (Note: Bigum entered the Folketing as one of the Green Left's compensatory seats.)
