= Marlene Harpsøe =

Danish politician (born 1983)

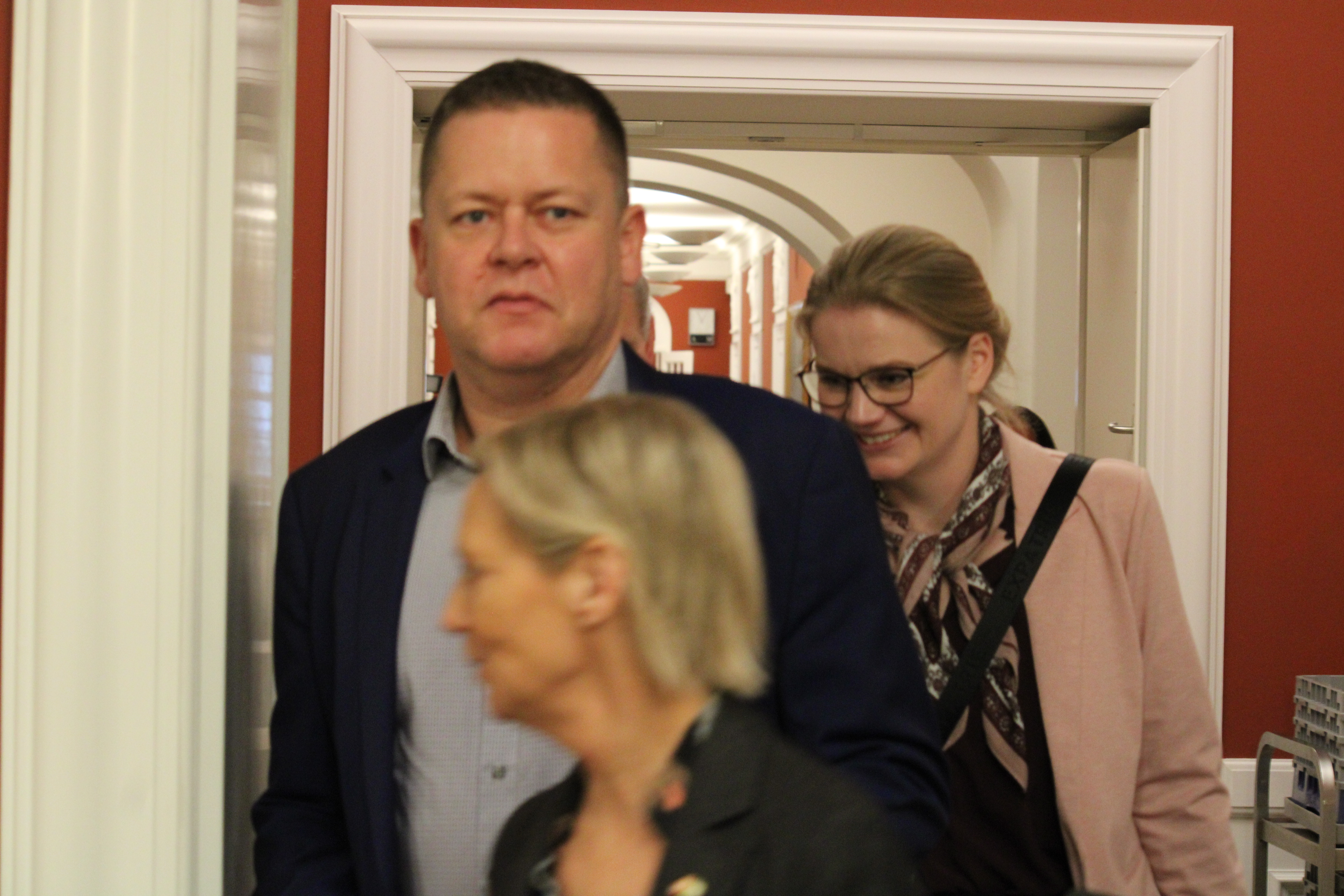
- Harpsøe (right) in 2025

Member of the Folketing
- Incumbent
- Assumed office 13 November 2007
- Constituency: North Zealand

Personal details
- Born: 3 August 1983 (age 42) Humlebæk, Denmark
- Party: Denmark Democrats (2022-)
- Other political affiliations: Danish People's Party (2005-2022)

Marlene Harpsøe (born 3 August 1983) is a Danish politician who served as a Member of the Folketing from 2007 to 2011 and then from 2015 to 2019 representing the Danish People's Party. She was again elected in 2022 as a member of the Denmark Democrats for the North Zealand constituency.

== Biography ==
=== Early life ===
Harpsøe was born in Humlebæk. She studied for a course in languages at a further education college and worked as an office manager for a chemical engineering company. She was then employed as a political secretary for the Danish People's Party from 2006 to 2007.

=== Political career ===
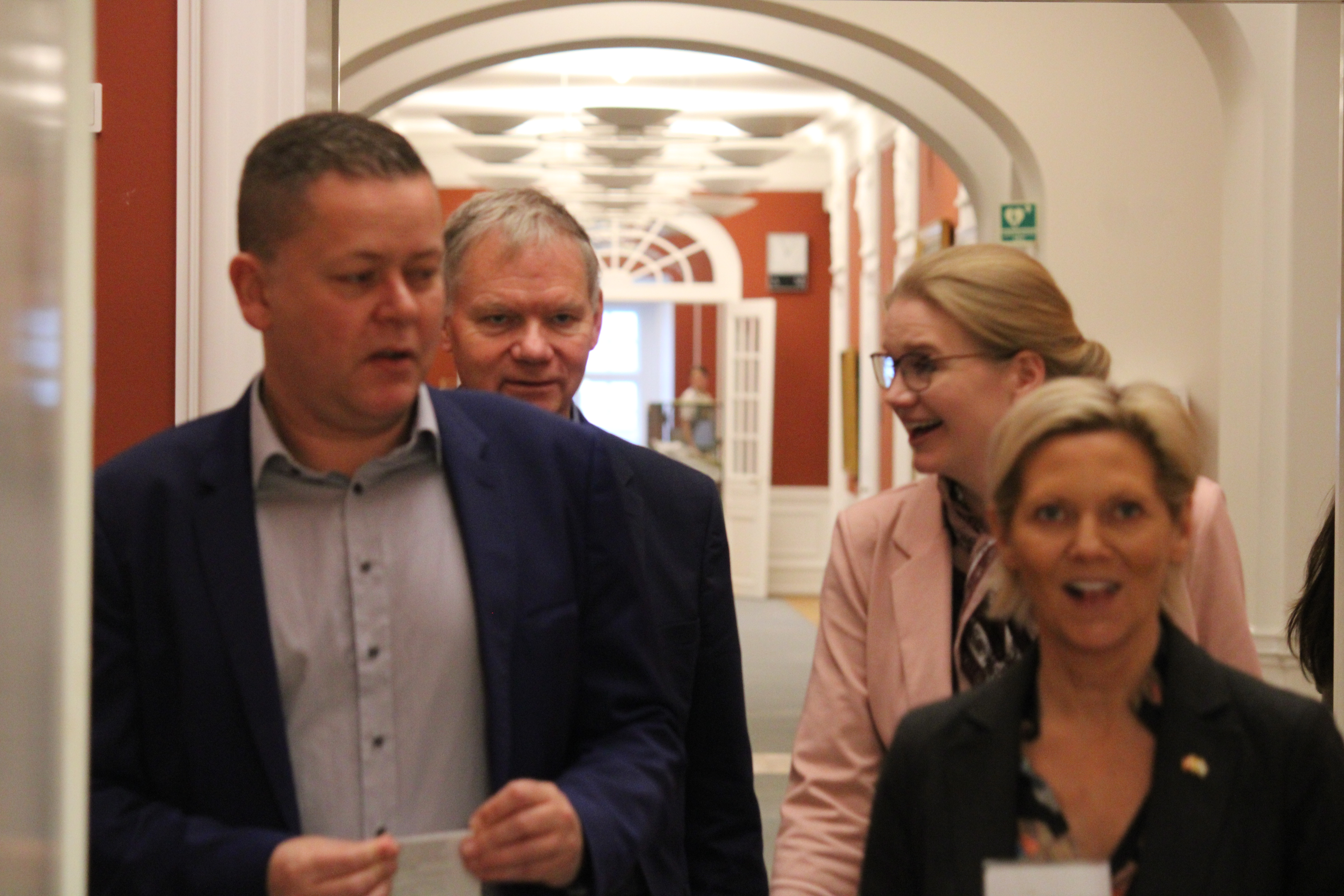
Harpsøe at Christiansborg in Copenhagen, December 2025

Harpsøe served as national vice-spokeswoman for the Youth of the Danish People's Party (DFU) and was the local association chairwoman of DFU in North Zealand and a board member of the Danish People's Party's local branch in Fredensborg Municipality. She was elected to the Folketing during the 2007 Danish general election. She later lost her seat during the 2011 election but regained it at the 2015 Danish general election when the DPP finished in second place. In 2014, she was also elected to Helsingør City Council

During the 2019 Danish general election, Harpsøe again lost her seat and in 2022 announced she was leaving the DPP citing conditions within the party. In August 2022, she joined the Denmark Democrats party and was re-elected to the Folketing.
