= Henrik Møller (politician) =

Danish politician

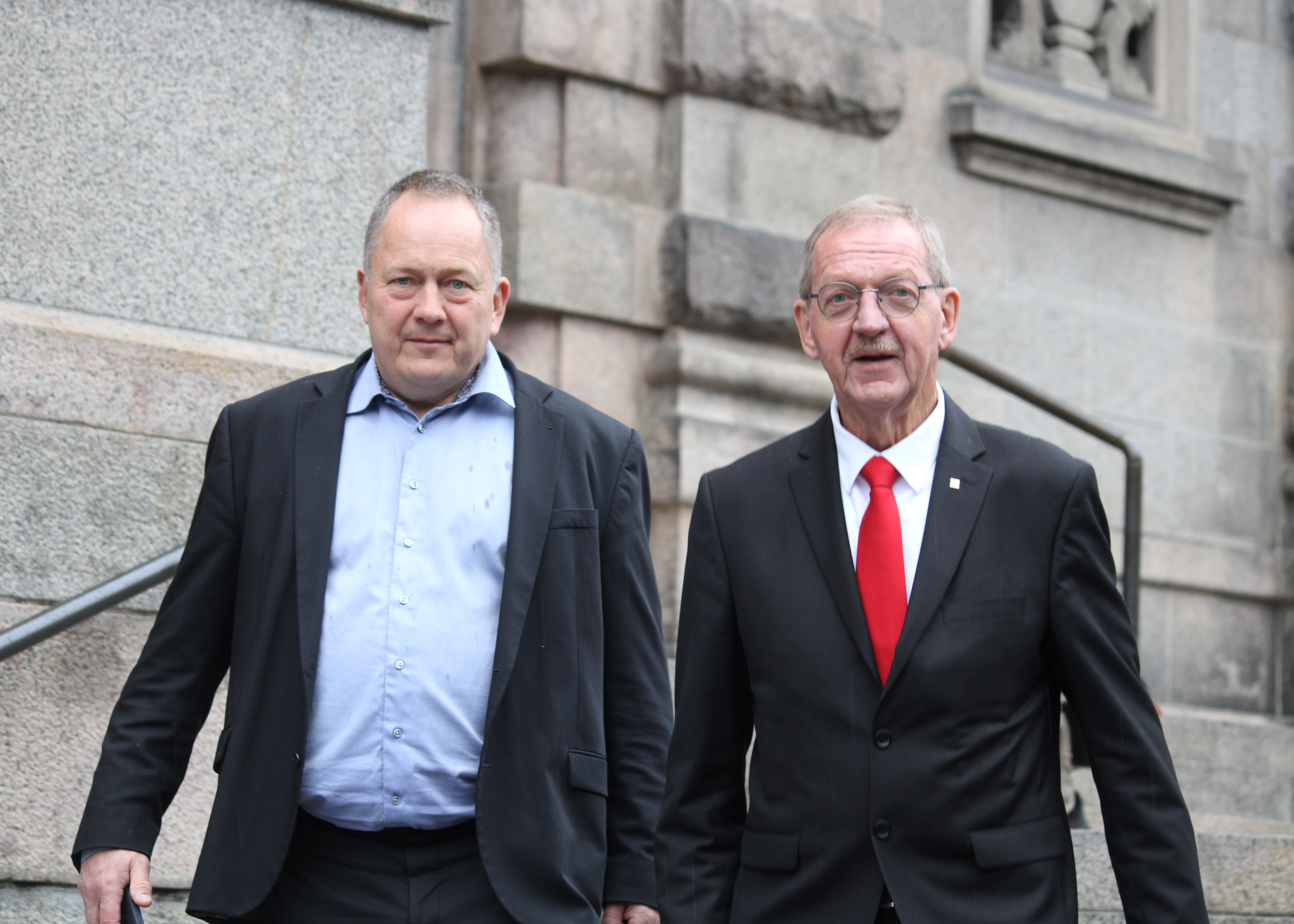
- Møller (to the left) in 2025

Member of the Folketing
- Incumbent
- Assumed office 5 June 2019
- Constituency: North Zealand

Personal details
- Born: 16 November 1965 (age 60) Helsingør, Denmark
- Party: Social Democrats

Henrik Berggren Møller (born 16 November 1965) is a Danish politician, who is a member of the Folketing for the Social Democrats political party. He was elected into parliament at the 2019 Danish general election.

== Political career ==
Møller sat in the municipal council of Helsingør Municipality from 1986 to 1993 and again from 1998 to 2019. He served as deputy mayor in the municipality from 2006 to 2019. He was elected into parliament at the 2019 election, where he received 4,223 personal votes.
