= Birgitte Bergman =

Danish politician

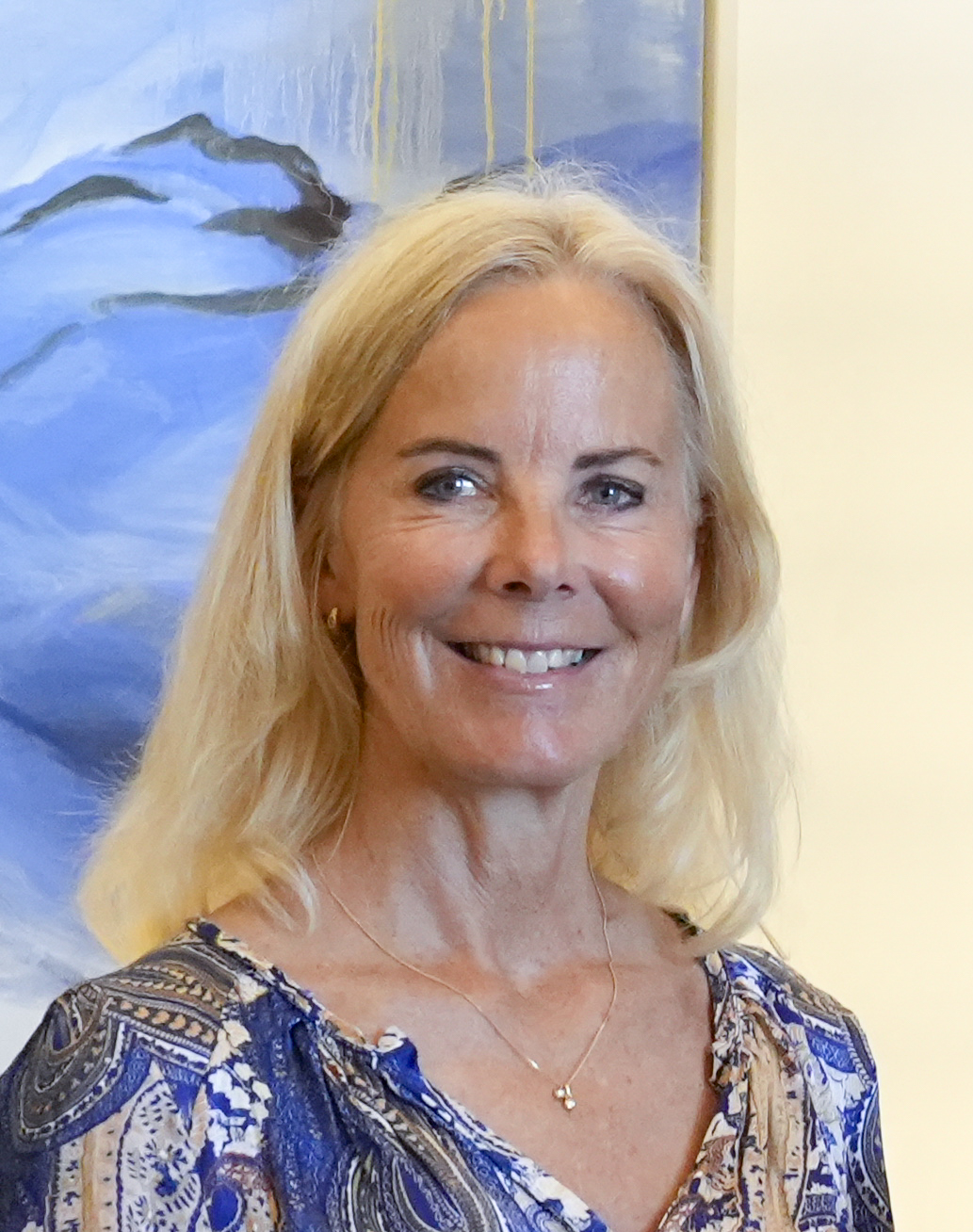
- Bergman in 2024

Member of the Folketing
- Incumbent
- Assumed office 5 June 2019
- Constituency: North Zealand

Personal details
- Born: 13 January 1967 (age 59) Helsingør, Denmark
- Party: Conservative People's Party

Birgitte Bergman Sørensen (born 13 January 1967 in Helsingør) is a Danish politician, who is a member of the Folketing for the Conservative People's Party. She was elected into the Folketing in the 2019 Danish general election.

== Political career ==
Bergman ran in the 2019 election, where she received 2,524 votes. This ensured her one of the Conservative People's Party's levelling seats.
