= Fie Hækkerup =

Danish politician (born 1994)

Member of the Folketing
- Incumbent
- Assumed office 1 November 2022
- Constituency: North Zealand

Personal details
- Born: 25 July 1994 (age 32) Hillerød, Denmark
- Party: Social Democrats
- Education: University of Copenhagen
- Website: fiehaekkerup.dk

Fie Thorsted Hækkerup (born 25 July 1994) is a Danish politician and Member of the Folketing. A Social Democrat, she has represented North Zealand since November 2022.

Hækkerup was born on 25 July 1994 in Hillerød. She is the daughter of Nick Hækkerup, former Justice Minister. Several of her other relatives have also been members of the Folketing. She has a Master of Arts degree in Danish from the University of Copenhagen (2020). She was a consultant at public affairs company Rud Pedersen from 2020 to 2022.

Hækkerup is married to Mikkel Juul Hækkerup.

Electoral history of Fie Hækkerup
Election	Constituency	Party	Votes	Result
2022 general	North Zealand	Social Democrats	5,789	Elected
2026 general	North Zealand	Social Democrats	5,763	Elected
