= Hillerød Municipality =

Hillerød Municipality Hillerød Kommune (Danish)
- Municipality
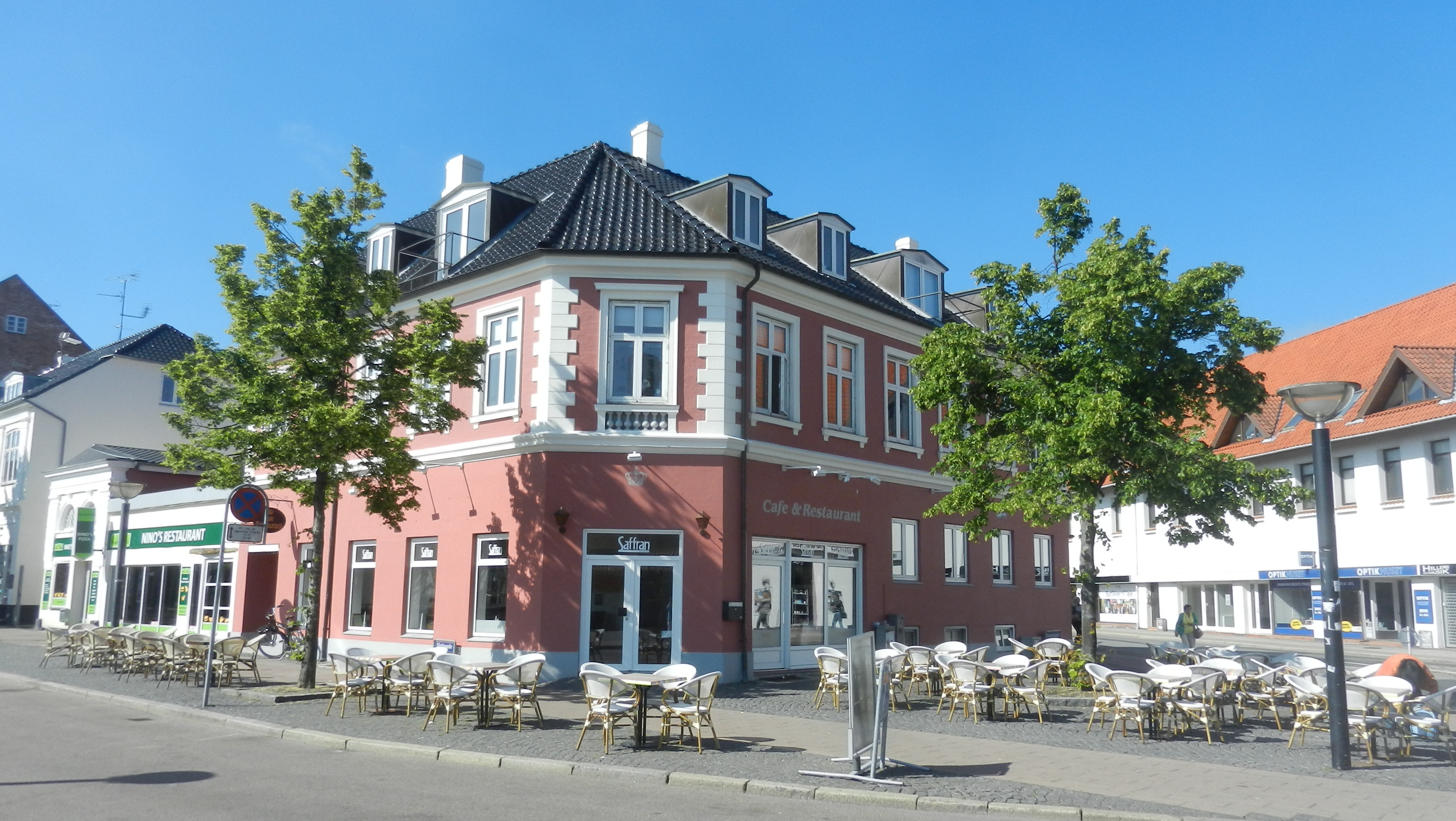

- Coat of arms

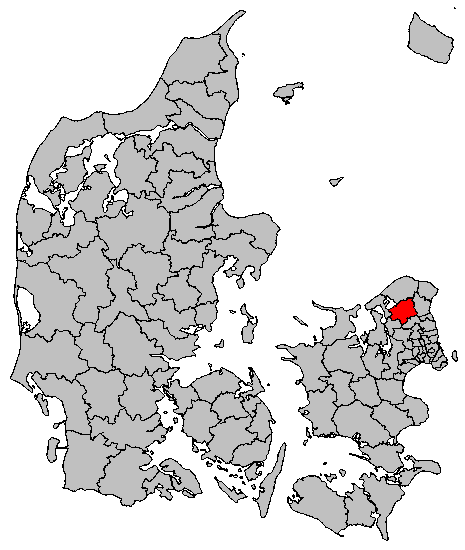
- Coordinates: 55°56′00″N 12°19′00″E
- Country: Denmark
- Region: Hovedstaden
- Established: 1 January 2007
- Seat: Hillerød

Government
  - Mayor: Kirsten Jensen (A)

Area
  - Total: 212.99 km^{2} (82.24 sq mi)

Population (1 January 2026)
  - Total: 55,182
  - Density: 259.08/km^{2} (671.02/sq mi)
- Time zone: UTC+1 (CET)
  - Summer (DST): UTC+2 (CEST)
- Postal code: 3400
- Municipal code: 219
- Website: www.hillerod.dk

Hillerød Municipality (Danish: Hillerød Kommune) is a municipality (Danish, kommune) in the Capital Region of Denmark. The municipality covers an area of 212.99 km^{2} (82.24 sq. miles), and has a total population of 55,182 (1 January 2026). The mayor of the municipality as of 1 January 2018 is Kirsten Jensen, a member of the Social Democratic political party.

== Overview ==
The main town and the site of its municipal council is the town also named as Hillerød. The city of Hillerød also houses the administrative capital of Region Hovedstaden.

Neighboring municipalities are Fredensborg municipality to the east, Gribskov municipality to the north, Frederiksværk-Hundested municipality to the west, and Frederikssund and Allerød to the south.

On 1 January 2007, Hillerød municipality was merged with Skævinge municipality and Uvelse valgdistrikt of former Slangerup municipality as the result of Kommunalreformen ("The Municipality Reform" of 2007), forming the new Hillerød municipality. At the same time, it became part of the capital of Region Hovedstaden, a new region that includes the Danish capital of Copenhagen, about 25 km to the southeast.

Arresø, the largest lake in Denmark, lies partly in the municipality.

== Urban areas ==
The ten largest urban areas in the municipality are:

#	Locality	Population
1	Hillerød	30,350
2	Skævinge	2,546
3	Nødebo	1,891
4	Ny Hammersholt	1,355
5	Tulstrup	1,249
6	Gadevang	1,116
7	Gørløse	1,058
8	Uvelse	983
9	Store Lyngby	847
10	Meløse	681

== Politics ==
=== Municipal council ===
Hillerød's municipal council consists of 27 members, elected every four years.

Below are the municipal councils elected since the Municipal Reform of 2007.

Election	Party											Total seats	Turnout	Elected mayor
Election	A	B	C	D	F	I	O	T	V	Ø	M	Total seats	Turnout	Elected mayor
2005	15		3		1		1	1	6			27	74.1%	Nick Hækkerup (A)
2009	8	1	4		3		1	2	8			27	71.2%	Kirsten Jensen (A)
2013	8	1	3		1	1	2	2	9			27	76.2%	Dorte Meldgaard (C)
2017	9	2	1	1	2		1		10	1		27	74.2%	Kirsten Jensen (A)
2021	7	2	5	1	4		1		6	1		27	69.5%	Kirsten Jensen (A)
2025	5	1	7		5	2	1		4	1	1	27	70.8%	Christoffer Lorenzen
Data from Valg.dk 2005, 2009, 2013 2017 2021 and 2025

== Twin towns – sister cities ==
Hillerød is twinned with:

- Kladovo, Serbia
