= Results of the 2019 Danish general election in Denmark =

This is a list of the results in the 2019 Danish general election in Denmark. The results are as found on the official website dedicated to the results made by Statistics Denmark.

== Denmark ==
Division	A	B	C	D	E	F	I	K	O	P	V	Ø	Å	Others	Red	Blue
Division	%	%	%	%	%	%	%	%	%	%	%	%	%	%	%	%
Denmark	25.9	8.6	6.6	2.4	0.8	7.7	2.3	1.7	8.7	1.8	23.4	6.9	3.0	0.1	52.1	47.8

== Vote share by electoral division ==
Division	A	B	C	D	E	F	I	K	O	P	V	Ø	Å	Others	Red	Blue
Division	%	%	%	%	%	%	%	%	%	%	%	%	%	%	%	%
Mid & Northern Jutland	28.0	7.2	6.4	1.9	0.7	6.8	2.4	2.8	8.5	1.6	25.9	5.2	2.5	0.0	49.7	50.3
Zealand & Southern Denmark	28.0	6.2	5.7	2.9	0.9	7.1	1.9	1.3	10.9	2.2	25.5	5.2	2.1	0.0	48.6	51.4
Capital	21.2	13.1	8.0	2.2	0.9	9.5	2.7	1.0	6.4	1.5	18.1	10.8	4.4	0.2	59.0	40.8

== Vote share by constituency ==
Division	A	B	C	D	E	F	I	K	O	P	V	Ø	Å	Others	Red	Blue
Division	%	%	%	%	%	%	%	%	%	%	%	%	%	%	%	%
North Jutland	33.9	5.1	4.9	2.0	0.8	5.4	1.9	1.6	9.5	1.7	26.8	4.3	2.0	0.0	50.6	49.4
West Jutland	24.6	5.3	9.2	1.7	0.6	6.2	2.2	5.3	8.4	1.6	29.8	3.4	1.7	0.0	41.2	58.8
East Jutland	25.8	9.9	5.7	2.0	0.7	8.2	2.9	2.1	7.8	1.5	22.6	7.1	3.4	0.1	54.5	45.4
South Jutland	26.1	5.9	5.1	4.1	0.7	5.2	2.1	2.2	12.5	1.8	28.5	4.1	1.6	0.1	42.9	57.0
Funen	30.2	7.3	6.2	1.9	0.8	6.7	1.9	1.1	8.9	1.9	23.4	6.8	3.0	0.0	54.0	46.0
Zealand	28.2	5.8	5.8	2.6	1.0	8.8	1.8	0.8	10.9	2.7	24.3	5.2	2.0	0.0	50.1	49.9
North Zealand	21.3	11.2	11.2	3.3	1.0	6.9	3.3	1.1	7.5	1.5	23.4	5.6	2.7	0.1	47.7	52.2
Greater Copenhagen	25.8	10.9	9.4	2.3	0.8	9.4	2.6	0.9	8.2	1.9	17.2	7.2	3.1	0.3	56.4	43.3
Copenhagen	17.2	16.4	5.3	1.4	1.0	11.5	2.6	0.7	4.2	1.3	15.0	16.8	6.5	0.1	68.4	31.4
Bornholm	34.0	3.3	1.8	1.7	0.9	4.3	1.0	4.1	10.4	1.9	25.3	8.1	3.3	0.0	53.0	47.0

== Vote share by nomination district ==
Division	A	B	C	D	E	F	I	K	O	P	V	Ø	Å	Others	Red	Blue
Division	%	%	%	%	%	%	%	%	%	%	%	%	%	%	%	%
Frederikshavn	38.0	2.9	4.7	2.7	0.8	3.8	1.2	1.8	12.3	2.1	25.3	3.2	1.2	0.0	49.1	50.9
Hjørring	32.7	3.9	6.3	2.4	0.7	4.9	1.3	1.7	10.1	1.9	28.9	3.9	1.4	0.0	46.8	53.2
Brønderslev	35.2	3.6	4.5	2.4	0.9	4.4	1.7	1.6	11.1	1.7	28.6	3.0	1.4	0.0	47.5	52.5
Thisted	35.3	3.4	5.4	1.5	0.7	3.8	1.3	2.2	10.0	1.5	29.6	3.6	1.5	0.0	47.7	52.3
Himmerland	29.5	4.5	5.4	2.1	0.8	6.4	1.5	1.5	10.6	1.7	31.6	3.0	1.5	0.0	44.9	55.1
Mariagerfjord	33.9	4.9	5.3	1.9	0.8	4.5	1.9	1.4	10.8	1.6	27.8	3.7	1.5	0.0	48.5	51.5
Aalborg East	34.8	7.9	3.9	1.6	1.0	7.0	2.7	1.6	6.9	1.8	21.2	6.4	3.2	0.0	59.3	40.7
Aalborg West	31.2	7.3	5.3	1.8	1.0	6.6	2.7	1.2	6.5	1.4	26.6	5.6	2.8	0.0	53.5	46.5
Aalborg North	33.9	6.6	4.1	1.9	0.9	6.2	2.8	1.2	8.1	1.8	23.7	5.9	2.9	0.0	55.5	44.5
Struer	26.8	4.6	8.3	1.6	0.5	6.0	1.8	4.5	8.5	1.6	31.8	2.8	1.3	0.0	41.4	58.6
Skive	30.2	6.2	5.9	1.8	0.5	5.7	1.5	1.7	7.7	1.9	32.5	3.3	1.1	0.0	46.5	53.5
Viborg West	26.1	5.3	16.1	1.4	0.6	8.7	1.9	1.8	7.1	1.6	23.1	4.0	2.2	0.0	46.3	53.7
Viborg East	24.3	4.6	17.5	1.5	0.5	6.7	2.0	3.0	8.1	1.3	26.0	2.9	1.6	0.0	40.2	59.8
Silkeborg North	23.9	6.0	8.8	2.0	0.8	6.9	2.2	4.3	8.5	1.6	28.0	4.5	2.5	0.0	43.9	56.1
Silkeborg South	25.9	7.9	9.2	1.6	0.7	8.1	2.7	2.1	6.9	1.5	24.3	6.0	3.1	0.0	51.0	49.0
Ikast	22.2	3.9	6.9	2.1	0.7	4.5	2.2	4.3	12.3	1.8	35.0	2.7	1.4	0.0	34.7	65.3
Herning South	22.2	6.6	8.3	1.8	0.6	5.3	3.6	5.4	7.7	1.7	31.6	3.1	1.9	0.0	39.1	60.9
Herning North	20.5	4.9	8.5	1.8	0.6	4.7	2.4	8.3	8.3	1.4	34.8	2.4	1.2	0.0	33.8	66.2
Holstebro	27.8	5.0	6.6	1.5	0.5	6.7	2.5	4.4	8.0	1.5	30.7	3.4	1.4	0.0	44.3	55.7
Ringkøbing	19.4	3.5	6.0	1.6	0.5	4.6	1.8	16.4	9.9	1.4	31.6	2.2	1.2	0.0	30.9	69.1
Aarhus South	23.4	12.3	6.5	1.8	0.7	10.0	2.9	1.8	5.1	1.1	21.5	8.6	4.2	0.1	58.5	41.4
Aarhus West	26.1	14.6	5.0	2.0	0.6	8.9	2.4	2.3	6.6	1.5	16.8	9.4	3.6	0.2	62.6	37.3
Aarhus North	22.9	15.2	5.0	1.5	0.8	11.0	3.3	2.6	4.3	1.2	15.6	11.0	5.4	0.1	65.5	34.3
Aarhus East	18.6	15.5	6.8	1.5	0.7	10.2	4.4	1.8	3.6	0.9	19.9	10.1	5.9	0.1	60.2	39.7
Djurs	29.7	5.3	4.5	2.3	0.9	7.2	2.7	1.7	10.4	1.8	25.4	5.5	2.6	0.1	50.3	49.6
Randers North	34.7	5.4	4.2	2.0	0.6	6.3	1.8	1.8	10.1	1.9	24.8	4.9	1.4	0.1	52.7	47.3
Randers South	30.6	5.2	4.6	2.2	0.7	6.7	2.3	2.6	9.4	1.8	26.7	5.0	2.1	0.1	49.7	50.3
Favrskov	28.1	7.0	7.0	2.1	0.6	6.2	2.2	1.9	9.2	1.7	27.4	4.4	2.1	0.1	47.8	52.1
Skanderborg	26.2	8.6	6.8	1.9	0.7	8.2	2.3	1.8	7.9	1.2	25.2	5.7	3.2	0.1	52.0	47.9
Horsens	27.8	6.9	6.1	2.4	0.8	6.5	3.1	1.7	11.5	2.2	23.7	5.1	2.0	0.1	48.3	51.5
Hedensted	23.9	4.2	5.4	2.4	0.8	4.3	2.4	4.8	14.2	2.0	31.1	3.1	1.3	0.1	36.8	63.2
Sønderborg	30.0	5.7	4.6	4.8	0.6	4.2	1.6	1.3	12.3	2.0	27.9	3.2	1.5	0.2	44.7	55.1
Aabenraa	25.8	4.8	4.1	4.6	0.7	4.2	1.5	2.0	14.8	2.0	31.1	3.2	1.2	0.1	39.2	60.8
Tønder	24.5	3.6	4.4	4.5	0.6	5.4	1.7	3.0	13.1	1.9	33.1	3.0	1.1	0.0	37.7	62.3
City of Esbjerg	30.9	6.0	4.7	3.8	0.8	6.2	2.1	1.5	10.9	2.2	21.9	7.0	2.0	0.0	52.1	47.9
Greater Esbjerg	26.3	4.9	5.4	4.1	0.8	5.2	2.1	1.7	11.7	1.7	30.4	4.0	1.6	0.1	42.1	57.9
Varde	22.4	4.5	4.4	3.9	0.8	3.9	2.6	3.0	13.3	1.9	35.1	2.9	1.2	0.1	35.0	65.0
Vejen	25.2	4.4	4.6	4.4	0.7	3.7	2.0	2.5	13.7	1.6	33.2	2.9	1.2	0.0	37.3	62.6
Vejle North	21.6	8.5	6.1	2.8	0.7	5.7	2.4	3.1	13.5	1.4	28.4	3.8	2.0	0.1	41.5	58.4
Vejle South	25.4	8.0	5.6	3.2	0.8	6.1	2.7	2.4	11.7	1.5	26.2	4.5	2.0	0.0	46.1	53.9
Fredericia	30.6	5.8	5.8	3.6	1.0	5.7	2.0	1.8	12.6	1.9	21.7	5.5	1.9	0.1	49.6	50.4
Kolding North	22.1	9.0	6.8	3.8	0.7	6.3	2.7	1.7	10.0	1.6	28.5	4.6	2.2	0.1	44.2	55.7
Kolding South	24.1	6.5	5.5	4.4	0.7	6.6	2.8	2.7	12.1	1.8	26.7	4.0	2.1	0.0	43.3	56.6
Haderslev	27.4	4.9	4.5	5.2	0.7	4.7	1.8	2.5	12.3	1.9	28.1	4.4	1.4	0.1	42.8	57.1
Odense East	28.1	13.2	4.7	1.6	0.9	8.1	2.6	1.0	6.4	2.0	17.0	10.0	4.4	0.0	63.9	36.1
Odense West	31.1	7.4	6.4	1.7	0.8	7.7	2.3	1.1	8.2	2.0	21.0	7.0	3.3	0.0	56.5	43.5
Odense South	25.9	10.0	8.1	1.8	0.7	7.3	2.6	1.3	6.6	1.4	24.1	6.7	3.5	0.0	53.4	46.6
Assens	31.4	4.5	5.5	2.2	0.8	6.0	1.4	1.3	11.4	2.3	26.1	5.0	2.2	0.0	49.0	51.0
Middelfart	31.4	5.2	6.1	2.1	0.8	5.8	1.7	1.1	10.3	2.0	27.8	4.0	1.8	0.0	48.1	51.9
Nyborg	34.8	4.8	6.5	2.1	0.8	5.5	1.5	1.0	10.0	2.1	23.5	5.4	2.0	0.0	52.6	47.4
Svendborg	30.9	6.0	5.9	1.9	0.8	6.5	1.4	1.0	8.9	1.8	21.8	9.0	3.9	0.0	56.4	43.6
Faaborg	29.2	5.4	5.8	1.9	0.9	6.2	1.3	1.2	10.6	1.8	27.1	6.0	2.7	0.0	49.5	50.5
Lolland	39.9	2.5	3.6	2.3	0.9	6.9	1.0	0.7	12.2	3.3	20.5	4.9	1.1	0.0	55.4	44.6
Guldborgsund	34.2	3.8	4.4	2.2	1.1	7.5	1.1	0.9	14.3	2.9	21.2	4.8	1.6	0.0	51.9	48.1
Vordingborg	30.0	6.2	4.8	2.3	0.9	9.6	1.2	0.7	9.7	2.8	22.2	6.7	2.8	0.1	55.3	44.7
Næstved	33.7	4.7	5.5	2.6	1.0	8.1	1.8	0.8	10.0	2.7	22.8	4.6	1.7	0.0	52.8	47.2
Faxe	26.3	4.3	6.7	2.9	1.3	9.5	1.8	0.8	12.0	3.3	24.7	4.8	1.8	0.0	46.7	53.3
Køge	22.7	6.5	7.0	2.7	1.0	14.1	2.0	0.9	9.4	2.1	25.3	4.4	1.9	0.0	49.7	50.3
Greve	23.6	7.0	7.3	2.8	0.9	6.8	2.6	0.8	10.6	2.2	30.6	3.4	1.5	0.0	42.3	57.7
Roskilde	23.8	9.8	7.4	2.0	0.9	10.7	2.4	0.8	7.4	1.7	23.2	6.7	3.0	0.0	54.0	46.0
Holbæk	29.1	6.5	5.9	2.2	1.2	7.3	2.0	0.9	10.5	2.5	23.7	6.1	2.1	0.1	51.0	48.9
Kalundborg	29.1	4.5	4.4	2.9	1.2	6.9	1.2	0.8	13.4	3.5	24.5	5.8	1.9	0.0	48.2	51.8
Ringsted	25.9	6.3	6.7	2.5	1.0	8.9	1.8	0.9	11.5	2.6	23.9	5.6	2.2	0.0	49.0	51.0
Slagelse	28.0	5.5	4.9	3.0	1.0	7.9	1.5	0.7	11.5	3.3	25.8	5.0	1.8	0.0	48.1	51.8
Helsingør	24.8	11.0	11.0	3.8	1.1	7.2	2.9	0.8	8.1	1.7	16.9	7.5	3.2	0.1	53.6	46.3
Fredensborg	16.3	12.7	15.5	3.1	0.9	5.8	4.5	0.9	6.3	1.2	26.2	4.2	2.3	0.1	41.3	58.6
Hillerød	22.6	9.2	8.2	3.6	1.0	6.9	2.7	2.2	8.4	1.8	24.1	5.9	3.0	0.2	47.7	52.1
Frederikssund	27.3	6.1	6.2	3.8	1.1	8.0	1.9	0.8	11.0	2.0	23.4	5.9	2.2	0.1	49.6	50.3
Egedal	22.4	12.5	10.5	2.7	0.9	7.5	3.2	0.9	6.9	1.2	23.1	5.6	2.6	0.1	50.6	49.4
Rudersdal	14.6	15.8	16.5	2.6	0.8	5.9	4.7	0.8	4.3	0.9	25.5	4.7	2.8	0.1	43.9	56.0
Gentofte	11.5	14.7	20.6	2.2	0.8	6.2	4.8	0.9	3.6	1.1	25.2	5.1	2.9	0.2	40.4	59.3
Lyngby	18.0	15.4	15.3	2.0	0.9	9.0	3.7	0.8	4.5	1.2	19.9	6.0	3.2	0.2	51.5	48.2
Gladsaxe	25.6	12.5	6.5	1.9	0.9	11.8	2.5	0.9	7.2	1.7	16.1	8.8	3.4	0.2	62.2	37.6
Rødovre	31.6	8.4	5.9	2.3	0.8	10.2	2.0	1.2	8.9	2.3	14.6	8.6	2.8	0.4	61.6	38.0
Hvidovre	29.4	8.8	5.1	2.4	0.9	11.3	1.8	1.1	10.9	2.3	14.9	7.9	2.9	0.4	60.4	39.3
Brøndby	31.1	10.5	6.4	2.5	0.7	8.0	1.6	0.7	10.8	2.4	15.1	6.8	3.3	0.3	59.7	40.0
Taastrup	28.1	9.1	7.9	2.6	0.8	10.3	1.7	0.9	9.8	2.3	14.2	8.3	3.8	0.3	59.5	40.2
Ballerup	32.3	7.5	5.8	2.5	0.8	9.2	2.3	1.1	10.6	2.2	16.6	6.6	2.4	0.3	57.9	41.8
Easterbro	16.0	18.3	6.3	1.3	0.8	11.2	3.1	0.8	3.0	1.1	17.7	14.2	6.2	0.1	65.8	34.1
Sundvester	17.5	16.8	4.4	1.4	1.0	12.0	3.2	0.6	4.3	1.3	15.3	15.5	6.5	0.2	68.3	31.6
Indre By	12.2	19.0	6.8	1.2	1.1	10.8	3.3	0.5	1.9	0.8	17.7	17.4	7.2	0.1	66.6	33.3
Sundbyøster	19.4	14.5	4.0	1.4	1.1	12.1	2.6	0.9	4.9	1.6	14.9	16.0	6.4	0.2	68.4	31.4
Nørrebro	11.8	19.1	2.3	0.8	0.9	13.1	1.6	0.5	2.0	0.8	8.6	28.5	9.9	0.2	82.5	17.3
Bispebjerg	17.1	15.5	2.8	1.5	1.0	12.3	1.8	1.0	4.2	1.5	9.3	23.7	8.0	0.2	76.5	23.3
Brønshøj	20.8	15.2	4.6	1.6	0.9	12.9	2.0	0.9	5.6	1.4	12.7	15.6	5.6	0.1	70.1	29.8
Valby	20.0	15.2	4.1	1.6	1.0	12.2	2.6	0.9	4.8	1.6	14.4	15.6	5.8	0.1	68.8	31.0
Vesterbro	14.1	17.8	3.7	1.2	1.0	12.2	2.9	0.5	2.7	1.2	12.9	21.2	8.6	0.1	73.8	26.0
Falkoner	14.4	19.4	9.4	1.3	0.8	11.0	2.8	0.7	3.2	0.7	18.1	12.5	5.5	0.1	62.9	37.0
Slots	17.0	16.1	9.7	1.5	0.9	10.1	3.0	0.8	4.3	1.2	18.3	12.2	4.7	0.1	60.1	39.7
Tårnby	28.3	7.8	6.4	2.5	1.1	7.3	2.0	0.7	11.3	2.1	22.1	6.0	2.4	0.1	51.7	48.2
Rønne	37.0	3.3	2.0	1.7	0.7	4.3	0.8	3.9	10.2	2.1	23.8	7.2	2.9	0.0	54.7	45.3
Aakirkeby	31.0	3.4	1.7	1.7	1.0	4.3	1.1	4.3	10.6	1.7	26.7	9.0	3.6	0.0	51.3	48.7

== Vote share by region ==
Division	A	B	C	D	E	F	I	K	O	P	V	Ø	Å	Others	Red	Blue
Division	%	%	%	%	%	%	%	%	%	%	%	%	%	%	%	%
North Denmark	33.9	5.1	4.9	2.0	0.8	5.4	1.9	1.6	9.5	1.7	26.8	4.3	2.0	0.0	50.6	49.4
Central Denmark	25.3	8.1	7.1	1.9	0.7	7.4	2.6	3.4	8.1	1.5	25.5	5.7	2.7	0.1	49.2	50.7
Southern Denmark	27.8	6.5	5.5	3.2	0.8	5.8	2.0	1.7	11.0	1.8	26.4	5.2	2.2	0.0	47.5	52.4
Zealand	28.2	5.8	5.8	2.6	1.0	8.8	1.8	0.8	10.9	2.7	24.3	5.2	2.0	0.0	50.1	49.9
Capital	21.2	13.1	8.0	2.2	0.9	9.5	2.7	1.0	6.4	1.5	18.1	10.8	4.4	0.2	59.0	40.8

== Vote share by municipality ==
Division	A	B	C	D	E	F	I	K	O	P	V	Ø	Å	Others	Red	Blue
Division	%	%	%	%	%	%	%	%	%	%	%	%	%	%	%	%
Frederikshavn	38.3	2.9	4.7	2.7	0.8	3.8	1.2	1.8	12.1	2.1	25.3	3.2	1.2	0.0	49.3	50.7
Læsø	28.9	2.9	6.3	1.6	0.7	3.7	0.8	2.0	18.7	1.5	25.9	5.7	1.2	0.0	42.5	57.5
Hjørring	32.7	3.9	6.3	2.4	0.7	4.9	1.3	1.7	10.1	1.9	28.9	3.9	1.4	0.0	46.8	53.2
Brønderslev	35.4	3.8	4.7	1.9	0.9	4.7	1.7	1.6	11.0	1.9	28.0	3.2	1.4	0.0	48.4	51.6
Jammerbugt	35.0	3.4	4.3	2.9	0.8	4.2	1.7	1.6	11.2	1.6	29.2	2.7	1.5	0.0	46.7	53.3
Thisted	34.1	3.6	6.2	1.6	0.7	3.9	1.4	2.5	10.2	1.4	28.8	3.8	1.7	0.0	47.2	52.8
Morsø	37.9	2.9	3.8	1.4	0.7	3.5	1.1	1.6	9.6	1.7	31.4	3.3	1.2	0.0	48.8	51.2
Vesthimmerland Municipality	27.9	3.3	5.9	2.4	0.7	7.4	1.1	1.5	11.7	2.0	32.5	2.5	1.0	0.0	42.1	57.9
Rebild	31.4	6.0	4.8	1.8	0.8	5.2	1.9	1.4	9.2	1.3	30.5	3.6	2.1	0.0	48.2	51.8
Mariagerfjord	33.9	4.9	5.3	1.9	0.8	4.5	1.9	1.4	10.8	1.6	27.8	3.7	1.5	0.0	48.5	51.5
Aalborg	33.4	7.3	4.4	1.8	1.0	6.6	2.7	1.3	7.2	1.7	23.6	6.0	3.0	0.0	56.3	43.7
Lemvig	23.2	4.8	9.5	1.5	0.5	5.8	1.6	4.9	8.6	1.7	34.4	2.5	1.1	0.0	37.4	62.6
Struer	30.1	4.4	7.1	1.7	0.6	6.2	2.0	4.1	8.4	1.6	29.3	3.1	1.4	0.0	45.2	54.8
Skive	30.2	6.2	5.9	1.8	0.5	5.7	1.5	1.7	7.7	1.9	32.5	3.3	1.1	0.0	46.5	53.5
Viborg	25.3	5.0	16.8	1.4	0.6	7.7	1.9	2.4	7.5	1.4	24.5	3.5	1.9	0.0	43.5	56.5
Silkeborg	24.9	7.0	9.0	1.8	0.8	7.5	2.4	3.1	7.7	1.5	26.1	5.3	2.8	0.0	47.6	52.4
Ikast-Brande	22.2	3.9	6.9	2.1	0.7	4.5	2.2	4.3	12.3	1.8	35.0	2.7	1.4	0.0	34.7	65.3
Herning	21.4	5.7	8.4	1.8	0.6	5.0	3.0	6.9	8.0	1.5	33.3	2.8	1.5	0.0	36.3	63.7
Holstebro	27.8	5.0	6.6	1.5	0.5	6.7	2.5	4.4	8.0	1.5	30.7	3.4	1.4	0.0	44.3	55.7
Ringkøbing-Skjern	19.4	3.5	6.0	1.6	0.5	4.6	1.8	16.4	9.9	1.4	31.6	2.2	1.2	0.0	30.9	69.1
Aarhus	22.5	14.4	5.9	1.7	0.7	10.1	3.3	2.1	4.8	1.2	18.5	9.8	4.9	0.1	61.7	38.2
Municipality	27.2	6.7	5.3	2.1	0.9	7.6	2.0	1.6	9.7	1.6	26.0	6.0	3.2	0.1	50.8	49.1
Municipality	32.7	3.5	3.5	2.5	0.8	6.8	3.6	1.8	11.3	2.1	24.6	4.8	1.8	0.1	49.7	50.2
Randers	32.6	5.3	4.4	2.1	0.7	6.5	2.0	2.2	9.7	1.9	25.8	5.0	1.8	0.1	51.1	48.8
Favrskov	28.1	7.0	7.0	2.1	0.6	6.2	2.2	1.9	9.2	1.7	27.4	4.4	2.1	0.1	47.8	52.1
Odder	27.0	7.6	8.1	1.8	0.7	8.4	1.6	1.8	7.6	1.3	24.6	6.4	2.9	0.1	52.4	47.5
Samsø	26.1	5.1	7.0	1.4	0.8	8.8	2.1	1.9	8.0	1.2	24.0	9.4	4.0	0.0	53.5	46.5
Skanderborg	25.8	9.2	6.4	2.0	0.8	8.1	2.6	1.8	8.0	1.2	25.5	5.3	3.3	0.1	51.7	48.2
Horsens	27.8	6.9	6.1	2.4	0.8	6.5	3.1	1.7	11.5	2.2	23.7	5.1	2.0	0.1	48.3	51.5
Hedensted	23.9	4.2	5.4	2.4	0.8	4.3	2.4	4.8	14.2	2.0	31.1	3.1	1.3	0.1	36.8	63.2
Sønderborg	30.0	5.7	4.6	4.8	0.6	4.2	1.6	1.3	12.3	2.0	27.9	3.2	1.5	0.2	44.7	55.1
Aabenraa	25.8	4.8	4.1	4.6	0.7	4.2	1.5	2.0	14.8	2.0	31.1	3.2	1.2	0.1	39.2	60.8
Tønder	24.5	3.6	4.4	4.5	0.6	5.4	1.7	3.0	13.1	1.9	33.1	3.0	1.1	0.0	37.7	62.3
Esbjerg	28.9	5.4	4.9	4.0	0.8	5.7	2.1	1.6	11.4	2.0	26.0	5.4	1.8	0.0	47.1	52.8
Fanø	24.9	7.4	8.0	1.5	1.2	8.2	1.5	1.1	8.7	0.9	22.2	10.4	4.0	0.0	55.0	45.0
Varde	22.4	4.5	4.4	3.9	0.8	3.9	2.6	3.0	13.3	1.9	35.1	2.9	1.2	0.1	35.0	65.0
Vejen	26.2	4.1	5.1	5.2	0.7	4.0	2.1	1.9	12.9	1.7	31.6	3.2	1.2	0.0	38.8	61.2
Billund	23.6	4.8	3.9	3.2	0.6	3.1	1.9	3.4	14.9	1.5	35.6	2.4	1.1	0.1	35.0	65.0
Vejle	23.5	8.2	5.8	3.0	0.8	5.9	2.5	2.7	12.6	1.5	27.2	4.2	2.0	0.0	43.8	56.1
Fredericia	30.6	5.8	5.8	3.6	1.0	5.7	2.0	1.8	12.6	1.9	21.7	5.5	1.9	0.1	49.6	50.4
Kolding	23.2	7.6	6.1	4.1	0.7	6.5	2.8	2.2	11.1	1.7	27.6	4.3	2.1	0.1	43.7	56.2
Haderslev	27.4	4.9	4.5	5.2	0.7	4.7	1.8	2.5	12.3	1.9	28.1	4.4	1.4	0.1	42.8	57.1
Odense	28.2	10.3	6.4	1.7	0.8	7.7	2.5	1.1	7.0	1.8	20.7	7.9	3.8	0.0	57.9	42.1
Assens	31.4	4.5	5.5	2.2	0.8	6.0	1.4	1.3	11.4	2.3	26.1	5.0	2.2	0.0	49.0	51.0
Middelfart	31.0	6.4	6.3	1.9	0.8	5.9	1.9	1.3	9.5	1.7	27.0	4.3	2.0	0.0	49.6	50.4
Nordfyn	31.9	3.5	5.9	2.3	0.7	5.7	1.4	0.9	11.4	2.5	28.8	3.6	1.4	0.0	46.1	53.9
Nyborg	34.3	5.0	5.2	2.3	0.8	5.6	1.5	0.8	9.7	1.9	25.2	5.6	2.2	0.0	52.7	47.3
Kerteminde	35.5	4.6	8.1	1.9	0.8	5.5	1.4	1.1	10.4	2.3	21.3	5.1	1.7	0.0	52.4	47.6
Svendborg	30.3	6.5	5.6	1.9	0.9	6.7	1.6	1.0	8.6	1.7	21.5	9.6	4.2	0.0	57.2	42.8
Langeland	34.0	3.9	7.2	1.8	0.7	5.9	0.6	0.9	10.4	1.9	23.5	6.6	2.5	0.0	53.0	47.0
Faaborg-Midtfyn	29.6	5.5	5.3	2.0	0.9	6.3	1.3	1.1	10.6	1.9	27.1	5.6	2.6	0.0	49.7	50.3
Ærø	25.6	4.9	9.5	1.4	0.8	5.7	0.7	1.3	10.2	1.0	26.5	9.2	3.3	0.0	48.6	51.4
Lolland	39.9	2.5	3.6	2.3	0.9	6.9	1.0	0.7	12.2	3.3	20.5	4.9	1.1	0.0	55.4	44.6
Guldborgsund	34.2	3.8	4.4	2.2	1.1	7.5	1.1	0.9	14.3	2.9	21.2	4.8	1.6	0.0	51.9	48.1
Vordingborg	30.0	6.2	4.8	2.3	0.9	9.6	1.2	0.7	9.7	2.8	22.2	6.7	2.8	0.1	55.3	44.7
Næstved	33.7	4.7	5.5	2.6	1.0	8.1	1.8	0.8	10.0	2.7	22.8	4.6	1.7	0.0	52.8	47.2
Faxe	27.7	3.9	6.1	3.0	1.3	8.7	1.7	0.9	12.3	3.5	24.3	4.7	1.9	0.0	46.9	53.1
Stevns	24.1	4.8	7.6	2.7	1.2	10.6	1.9	0.8	11.4	2.9	25.2	5.1	1.6	0.0	46.3	53.7
Køge	22.8	6.1	7.1	2.7	0.9	15.6	2.0	0.8	9.3	2.3	25.1	3.8	1.5	0.0	49.9	50.1
Lejre	22.5	7.3	6.6	2.7	1.1	11.0	2.1	1.0	9.4	1.9	25.8	5.7	2.8	0.0	49.3	50.7
Greve	24.7	6.9	6.4	2.8	0.8	6.5	2.3	0.9	10.9	2.3	30.3	3.7	1.5	0.0	43.3	56.7
Solrød	21.3	7.1	9.0	2.7	1.0	7.4	3.4	0.7	9.8	2.1	31.3	2.9	1.4	0.0	40.1	59.9
Roskilde	23.8	9.8	7.4	2.0	0.9	10.7	2.4	0.8	7.4	1.7	23.2	6.7	3.0	0.0	54.0	46.0
Holbæk	29.1	6.5	5.9	2.2	1.2	7.3	2.0	0.9	10.5	2.5	23.7	6.1	2.1	0.1	51.0	48.9
Kalundborg	28.3	4.4	4.1	3.2	1.0	6.9	1.3	0.8	13.6	4.0	25.6	5.3	1.6	0.0	46.4	53.5
Odsherred	30.4	4.6	4.8	2.5	1.4	6.8	1.2	0.8	13.0	2.9	22.8	6.5	2.3	0.0	50.6	49.3
Ringsted	25.7	6.7	6.4	2.4	1.0	8.9	2.0	0.7	11.6	2.4	24.5	5.6	2.1	0.0	49.0	51.0
Sorø	26.2	6.0	6.9	2.6	1.1	8.9	1.6	1.2	11.4	2.8	23.4	5.7	2.3	0.0	49.0	51.0
Slagelse	28.0	5.5	4.9	3.0	1.0	7.9	1.5	0.7	11.5	3.3	25.8	5.0	1.8	0.0	48.1	51.8
Helsingør	24.8	11.0	11.0	3.8	1.1	7.2	2.9	0.8	8.1	1.7	16.9	7.5	3.2	0.1	53.6	46.3
Fredensborg	19.6	13.3	11.4	3.0	1.0	7.2	3.7	1.0	7.2	1.3	22.9	5.4	2.9	0.1	48.4	51.5
Hørsholm	11.5	11.7	21.7	3.2	0.8	3.7	5.7	0.8	4.9	1.1	31.3	2.4	1.4	0.0	30.6	69.3
Hillerød	23.3	11.3	8.5	3.2	0.7	7.4	3.1	2.2	6.5	1.5	22.6	6.3	3.2	0.2	51.5	48.4
Gribskov	21.8	6.8	7.9	4.1	1.3	6.3	2.3	2.2	10.6	2.2	26.0	5.5	2.9	0.2	43.3	56.5
Frederikssund	26.2	6.7	7.1	3.8	1.0	6.9	2.1	0.8	10.6	1.9	25.1	5.7	2.1	0.1	47.5	52.4
Halsnæs	29.1	5.3	5.0	3.9	1.2	9.7	1.6	0.8	11.7	2.1	20.8	6.1	2.4	0.1	52.6	47.3
Egedal	24.5	9.3	8.7	3.2	1.0	7.1	3.1	0.8	9.0	1.5	25.0	4.5	2.1	0.1	47.5	52.4
Furesø	20.0	15.9	12.4	2.2	0.7	8.0	3.4	0.9	4.6	1.0	20.9	6.8	3.2	0.1	53.9	46.0
Rudersdal	12.8	16.6	17.4	2.5	0.8	5.3	5.3	0.7	3.8	0.9	26.2	4.7	3.0	0.1	42.3	57.6
Allerød	18.6	14.2	14.4	2.8	0.7	7.1	3.4	1.0	5.5	0.9	24.0	4.7	2.6	0.1	47.2	52.7
Gentofte	11.5	14.7	20.6	2.2	0.8	6.2	4.8	0.9	3.6	1.1	25.2	5.1	2.9	0.2	40.4	59.3
Lyngby-Taarbæk	18.0	15.4	15.3	2.0	0.9	9.0	3.7	0.8	4.5	1.2	19.9	6.0	3.2	0.2	51.5	48.2
Gladsaxe	25.6	12.5	6.5	1.9	0.9	11.8	2.5	0.9	7.2	1.7	16.1	8.8	3.4	0.2	62.2	37.6
Rødovre	31.4	8.7	5.5	2.2	0.8	10.7	2.0	1.0	9.2	2.3	14.3	8.6	2.9	0.4	62.3	37.4
Herlev	32.0	8.0	6.4	2.4	0.7	9.6	2.0	1.5	8.5	2.3	15.1	8.6	2.7	0.4	60.8	38.8
Hvidovre	29.4	8.8	5.1	2.4	0.9	11.3	1.8	1.1	10.9	2.3	14.9	7.9	2.9	0.4	60.4	39.3
Brøndby	34.8	9.5	4.2	2.2	0.7	8.1	1.3	0.6	11.3	2.6	13.2	7.6	3.5	0.4	63.6	36.0
Ishøj	30.2	12.7	3.7	3.1	0.6	8.5	1.4	0.7	11.4	2.6	14.2	7.3	3.3	0.1	62.1	37.8
Vallensbæk	24.8	9.7	14.0	2.3	0.6	7.1	2.4	0.7	9.1	1.6	20.1	4.7	2.7	0.2	49.0	50.7
Høje-Taastrup	27.1	9.0	10.0	2.8	0.9	8.3	1.9	1.0	10.7	2.3	16.6	6.0	3.1	0.3	53.7	46.0
Albertslund	29.7	9.2	4.1	2.4	0.7	13.9	1.3	0.8	8.1	2.2	10.1	12.2	5.0	0.3	69.9	29.8
Ballerup	33.2	7.6	5.7	2.4	0.8	9.6	2.2	1.2	10.0	2.0	15.6	6.9	2.4	0.3	59.7	40.0
Glostrup	30.1	7.4	6.0	2.7	0.8	8.3	2.3	0.8	11.8	2.5	18.9	5.8	2.4	0.3	54.0	45.7
Copenhagen	16.4	17.0	4.4	1.3	1.0	12.1	2.6	0.7	3.7	1.2	13.7	18.6	7.2	0.1	71.3	28.6
Frederiksberg	15.7	17.8	9.6	1.4	0.9	10.6	2.9	0.8	3.7	1.0	18.2	12.3	5.1	0.1	61.5	38.3
Tårnby	31.4	7.1	4.8	2.5	1.1	8.0	1.8	0.7	12.4	2.3	18.9	6.5	2.4	0.1	55.4	44.5
Dragør	19.7	9.8	10.7	2.4	1.0	5.6	2.7	0.6	8.5	1.4	30.9	4.5	2.2	0.1	41.7	58.3
Bornholm	34.0	3.3	1.8	1.7	0.9	4.3	1.0	4.1	10.4	1.9	25.3	8.1	3.3	0.0	53.0	47.0
