= Results of the 2024 European Parliament election in Denmark =

This is a list of the results of the 2024 European Parliament election in Denmark. The results are from the official website dedicated to the results made by Statistics Denmark.

== Denmark ==
Division	A	B	C	F	I	M	O	V	Æ	Ø	Å
Division	%	%	%	%	%	%	%	%	%	%	%
Denmark	15.6	7.1	8.8	17.4	7.0	6.0	6.4	14.7	7.4	7.0	2.7

== Vote share by electoral division ==
Division	A	B	C	F	I	M	O	V	Æ	Ø	Å
Division	%	%	%	%	%	%	%	%	%	%	%
Mid & Northern Jutland	15.8	6.8	8.5	15.7	7.1	5.4	6.0	16.5	11.0	5.2	2.4
Zealand & Southern Denmark	17.8	3.6	8.6	15.2	6.8	6.1	8.0	16.9	8.5	4.9	2.0
Capital	13.0	3.5	9.4	21.6	7.0	6.3	5.0	10.6	2.6	11.2	3.6

== Vote share by constituency ==
Division	A	B	C	F	I	M	O	V	Æ	Ø	Å
Division	%	%	%	%	%	%	%	%	%	%	%
North Jutland	18.1	5.1	7.0	12.9	6.4	4.9	6.0	17.2	15.5	4.9	2.1
West Jutland	14.6	4.6	9.5	12.6	7.7	5.2	6.8	21.0	13.5	2.9	1.6
East Jutland	15.1	8.0	9.0	19.3	7.1	6.0	5.5	13.4	6.5	6.9	3.2
South Jutland	16.7	4.6	8.9	12.1	7.8	5.4	8.0	21.3	10.2	3.3	1.6
Funen	19.3	6.3	8.2	17.6	5.9	5.9	6.5	14.0	7.4	6.4	2.6
Zealand	17.7	5.3	8.7	16.2	6.5	6.9	8.9	14.9	7.7	5.3	2.0
North Zealand	13.2	8.6	11.7	17.2	8.5	8.4	6.0	14.9	3.8	5.4	2.3
Greater Copenhagen	16.4	8.6	10.9	18.6	7.3	6.6	6.6	11.4	3.0	8.2	2.6
Copenhagen	10.5	11.6	7.0	26.4	6.0	4.8	3.3	7.1	1.3	16.8	5.1
Bornholm	20.0	4.2	8.0	15.6	4.1	5.0	7.7	18.0	7.8	7.3	2.2

== Vote share by nomination district ==
Division	A	B	C	F	I	M	O	V	Æ	Ø	Å
Division	%	%	%	%	%	%	%	%	%	%	%
Frederikshavn	21.9	2.4	6.3	10.8	6.0	5.7	8.6	16.6	17.4	3.2	1.1
Hjørring	19.4	3.7	7.6	11.5	5.4	4.9	6.7	19.6	16.3	3.7	1.2
Brønderslev	19.7	3.6	5.9	10.7	6.1	4.7	6.7	18.8	19.2	3.5	1.2
Thisted	17.8	3.3	6.0	11.5	5.7	4.4	6.6	20.1	19.6	3.5	1.6
Himmerland	14.6	4.4	7.1	11.4	5.7	4.0	6.0	23.5	18.6	3.3	1.4
Mariagerfjord	18.0	3.8	6.5	11.4	5.4	4.8	6.5	16.5	22.0	3.5	1.7
Aalborg East	17.9	8.2	7.7	16.8	7.2	4.6	4.8	11.9	9.8	7.4	3.6
Aalborg West	16.5	7.3	8.1	15.5	7.8	5.7	4.0	15.1	10.1	7.2	2.7
Aalborg North	18.1	6.8	7.1	14.6	7.7	5.1	5.3	13.8	11.2	7.1	3.3
Struer	15.1	3.6	7.6	13.9	8.1	4.2	7.7	22.9	13.7	2.2	1.0
Skive	16.9	3.5	6.1	12.7	6.1	5.4	7.2	17.8	20.4	2.8	1.3
Viborg West	16.4	4.9	10.4	15.0	6.9	4.4	6.7	17.4	11.9	3.7	2.3
Viborg East	14.7	4.4	11.9	12.1	7.0	4.8	6.4	20.0	14.5	2.7	1.5
Silkeborg North	13.7	5.6	10.1	14.8	8.0	6.3	6.5	17.8	11.6	3.6	2.0
Silkeborg South	15.3	7.6	9.7	17.2	7.7	7.2	5.1	16.0	6.4	5.2	2.5
Ikast	13.8	3.7	8.4	8.8	8.1	4.2	8.9	25.2	15.3	2.1	1.4
Herning South	13.2	4.9	10.1	10.7	9.3	6.2	6.8	22.3	12.0	2.9	1.7
Herning North	12.5	4.1	10.6	9.5	8.3	5.5	6.3	25.1	15.0	1.9	1.2
Holstebro	16.5	4.4	8.4	13.0	8.6	4.5	7.8	21.2	11.9	2.6	1.2
Ringkøbing	11.9	3.0	11.0	9.3	7.2	4.3	6.4	26.6	17.9	1.4	0.9
Aarhus South	13.9	10.0	9.1	23.3	6.7	6.5	3.5	11.9	3.3	8.2	3.7
Aarhus West	15.8	8.9	8.7	21.2	6.3	6.1	4.7	10.6	4.3	10.0	3.4
Aarhus North	12.4	11.1	8.6	26.2	6.5	4.4	3.2	8.9	2.8	10.9	5.0
Aarhus East	10.9	12.1	9.3	23.8	8.2	5.6	2.7	11.2	2.1	9.4	4.6
Djurs	17.2	4.7	7.1	16.4	6.1	6.3	7.6	15.2	11.5	5.3	2.5
Randers North	20.1	3.9	7.4	14.2	6.8	6.0	9.2	14.0	12.1	4.6	1.8
Randers South	18.6	4.7	8.3	14.3	8.0	5.9	8.4	14.5	10.4	4.8	2.3
Favrskov	16.3	7.0	10.0	15.2	7.5	6.0	6.5	15.8	9.9	3.7	2.1
Skanderborg	16.2	7.6	8.8	19.0	6.9	6.7	4.9	15.4	6.7	5.2	2.6
Horsens	17.2	5.9	10.2	14.4	7.7	6.4	7.9	15.0	8.0	4.9	2.4
Hedensted	14.1	4.0	10.9	10.0	8.0	6.4	8.6	21.6	12.8	2.3	1.3
Sønderborg	20.0	4.3	7.6	11.5	6.9	5.7	8.9	19.7	10.5	3.4	1.5
Aabenraa	17.6	3.6	7.6	9.6	7.1	4.9	9.7	22.7	13.4	2.6	1.3
Tønder	15.8	2.5	7.3	9.0	6.7	4.5	8.5	27.0	15.4	2.1	1.3
City of Esbjerg	20.0	4.6	8.1	15.0	8.4	4.6	8.3	16.2	7.6	5.4	2.0
Greater Esbjerg	16.4	4.3	8.0	12.0	9.5	5.3	7.3	22.5	10.8	2.6	1.4
Varde	14.3	2.9	8.6	8.7	6.7	4.6	7.8	28.7	14.6	1.8	1.2
Vejen	14.5	3.4	8.2	9.0	7.7	5.1	8.5	27.1	13.2	2.0	1.4
Vejle North	14.8	6.3	12.4	13.6	7.8	6.3	6.5	19.1	8.5	3.0	1.8
Vejle South	16.9	5.8	11.2	14.2	7.8	6.0	7.1	17.7	7.2	4.1	2.0
Fredericia	19.2	5.0	8.9	14.9	7.7	6.5	8.5	15.0	8.0	4.1	2.2
Kolding North	13.6	6.4	9.1	13.8	9.3	6.2	6.4	22.9	6.1	4.4	1.8
Kolding South	15.1	5.6	9.3	14.6	8.4	4.9	7.7	20.6	8.3	3.6	1.9
Haderslev	17.5	4.1	8.8	11.2	7.1	5.1	9.4	21.2	10.9	3.2	1.4
Odense East	18.3	8.6	8.2	20.9	5.9	5.4	5.4	8.7	3.6	11.0	4.2
Odense West	19.5	7.3	9.2	19.0	6.5	5.4	6.2	11.6	4.9	7.1	3.4
Odense South	17.3	8.5	10.9	17.9	7.0	6.7	4.7	13.7	3.9	6.4	3.0
Assens	20.8	4.8	7.6	14.2	5.7	5.5	7.9	17.5	10.4	3.7	1.8
Middelfart	19.9	5.1	7.5	14.7	6.3	6.3	7.2	17.6	10.4	3.3	1.7
Nyborg	21.2	4.6	8.1	16.5	5.6	6.2	7.7	15.0	9.0	4.4	1.7
Svendborg	18.5	5.4	6.3	20.2	5.3	5.8	6.5	13.8	7.2	8.8	2.4
Faaborg	20.2	4.8	7.1	16.0	5.0	5.8	7.2	15.6	11.4	4.9	2.0
Lolland	25.4	2.6	9.1	13.9	3.8	4.9	12.5	12.3	10.1	4.1	1.3
Guldborgsund	21.9	3.3	10.4	14.5	5.1	6.4	10.8	12.4	9.5	4.3	1.4
Vordingborg	19.0	4.5	6.9	17.7	5.1	7.5	9.2	13.7	7.4	6.6	2.2
Næstved	19.3	4.4	8.5	15.3	7.0	7.2	9.3	14.1	8.2	4.7	2.0
Faxe	17.1	4.3	8.1	15.3	6.5	6.9	10.3	15.1	10.0	4.7	1.8
Køge	15.1	6.3	9.1	18.5	7.1	7.5	8.0	14.9	6.1	5.5	2.0
Greve	16.1	5.8	10.2	12.1	9.5	8.0	8.5	18.9	5.2	3.7	1.8
Roskilde	14.6	8.7	9.2	20.2	7.3	7.4	5.5	14.2	3.6	6.9	2.5
Holbæk	17.8	5.9	7.2	17.8	6.2	6.6	8.0	14.7	7.8	6.0	1.9
Kalundborg	18.3	4.1	6.4	15.2	5.3	5.9	11.2	15.3	11.0	5.5	1.8
Ringsted	15.9	5.3	10.4	17.5	6.4	6.1	8.1	14.9	8.2	5.2	2.2
Slagelse	19.1	4.2	8.3	13.5	6.6	6.7	9.9	16.2	8.7	4.7	2.0
Helsingør	14.4	8.2	12.1	19.1	7.9	8.3	6.4	10.5	3.4	7.0	2.7
Fredensborg	11.0	9.1	14.2	14.1	10.9	9.2	4.8	17.7	2.7	4.2	2.0
Hillerød	13.6	7.7	11.0	17.5	7.2	9.0	6.8	13.8	5.2	5.8	2.4
Frederikssund	16.7	5.2	7.3	18.1	6.9	7.4	9.7	13.8	6.3	6.2	2.4
Egedal	14.1	9.6	11.2	19.0	7.5	7.8	5.5	14.6	3.2	5.3	2.2
Rudersdal	10.1	11.2	14.3	15.3	10.5	8.7	3.6	18.1	1.9	4.2	2.1
Gentofte	8.9	11.0	16.9	14.1	12.1	8.4	3.6	16.8	1.4	4.7	2.1
Lyngby	11.4	12.3	13.4	19.8	8.7	7.7	3.9	13.8	1.4	5.1	2.5
Gladsaxe	16.7	10.3	8.4	22.3	6.2	6.0	5.5	9.6	2.5	9.5	2.9
Rødovre	20.0	7.3	8.7	20.4	5.6	5.9	7.5	8.6	3.4	9.7	2.8
Hvidovre	19.0	7.0	8.6	21.7	5.4	5.9	8.4	8.4	3.8	9.0	2.7
Brøndby	20.6	5.5	9.4	15.6	5.6	6.1	9.3	9.6	4.8	11.1	2.3
Taastrup	18.4	6.7	9.8	18.2	5.6	5.4	8.4	9.9	4.1	11.0	2.5
Ballerup	20.1	6.7	8.9	18.7	6.2	6.2	8.1	11.0	3.8	7.2	2.9
Østerbro	10.1	13.0	7.9	25.9	7.1	5.4	2.9	8.5	1.0	13.4	4.8
Sundbyvester	10.3	12.0	6.5	26.4	6.4	5.0	3.6	7.1	1.4	16.0	5.4
Inner City	8.9	12.9	7.4	25.9	7.9	5.8	2.2	8.0	0.7	15.4	4.8
Sundbyvester	11.1	11.4	6.2	28.3	6.0	4.4	3.7	6.5	1.4	15.7	5.3
Nørrebro	6.6	11.3	3.8	30.7	3.4	2.7	1.7	3.7	0.6	28.0	7.5
Bispebjerg	9.2	9.5	4.7	28.3	3.7	3.0	3.5	4.0	1.3	25.7	7.0
Brønshøj	12.5	10.5	6.5	28.4	4.8	4.5	3.9	6.2	1.4	16.9	4.3
Valby	11.0	11.4	6.9	26.7	6.1	4.4	3.8	6.8	1.4	16.1	5.4
Vesterbro	8.2	12.7	5.8	28.5	6.2	4.2	2.3	5.6	0.8	19.8	5.9
Falkoner	10.6	13.7	9.9	24.8	6.8	5.7	2.2	9.0	1.1	12.4	3.9
Slots	11.9	11.3	10.8	22.2	6.8	5.5	3.6	10.0	1.3	12.6	3.9
Tårnby	18.2	7.3	9.5	17.8	6.9	7.2	8.4	11.3	4.8	6.1	2.4
Rønne	22.7	4.2	8.2	15.8	3.8	5.3	8.0	16.5	7.3	6.2	2.0
Aakirkeby	17.4	4.2	7.9	15.5	4.3	4.8	7.5	19.3	8.3	8.4	2.4

== Vote share by region ==
Division	A	B	C	F	I	M	O	V	Æ	Ø	Å
Division	%	%	%	%	%	%	%	%	%	%	%
North Denmark	18.1	5.1	7.0	12.9	6.4	4.9	6.0	17.2	15.5	4.9	2.1
Central Denmark	14.9	6.7	9.2	16.8	7.4	5.7	6.0	16.3	9.2	5.4	2.6
Southern Denmark	17.8	5.3	8.6	14.5	7.0	5.6	7.4	18.2	9.0	4.6	2.0
Zealand	17.7	5.3	8.7	16.2	6.5	6.9	8.9	14.9	7.7	5.3	2.0
Capital	13.0	9.8	9.4	21.6	7.0	6.3	5.0	10.6	2.6	11.2	3.6

== Vote share by municipality ==
Division	A	B	C	F	I	M	O	V	Æ	Ø	Å
Division	%	%	%	%	%	%	%	%	%	%	%
Brønderslev	19.9	3.9	6.3	10.9	6.2	4.9	6.1	18.2	18.5	4.0	1.1
Frederikshavn	22.3	2.4	6.3	10.8	6.0	5.8	8.4	16.5	17.4	3.1	1.0
Hjørring	19.4	3.7	7.6	11.5	5.4	4.9	6.7	19.6	16.3	3.7	1.2
Jammerbugt	19.5	3.3	5.5	10.4	6.0	4.5	7.2	19.3	19.9	3.1	1.3
Læsø	11.5	2.7	5.7	11.5	3.9	4.3	15.2	18.0	19.5	5.5	2.3
Mariagerfjord	18.0	3.8	6.5	11.4	5.4	4.8	6.5	16.5	22.0	3.5	1.7
Morsø	19.0	2.7	5.2	10.9	5.2	4.6	7.4	20.3	21.4	2.4	0.9
Rebild	14.9	5.8	8.1	13.4	6.5	4.6	5.0	18.6	17.0	4.2	1.9
Thisted	17.3	3.5	6.4	11.7	5.9	4.2	6.3	20.0	18.7	4.0	1.9
Vesthimmerland	14.2	3.0	6.1	9.5	4.9	3.5	7.0	28.3	20.2	2.5	0.9
Aalborg	17.5	7.5	7.7	15.7	7.5	5.1	4.7	13.5	10.3	7.2	3.2
Favrskov	16.3	7.0	10.0	15.2	7.5	6.0	6.5	15.8	9.9	3.7	2.1
Hedensted	14.1	4.0	10.9	10.0	8.0	6.4	8.6	21.6	12.8	2.3	1.3
Herning	12.8	4.5	10.4	10.1	8.7	5.8	6.5	23.8	13.6	2.3	1.4
Holstebro	16.5	4.4	8.4	13.0	8.6	4.5	7.8	21.2	11.9	2.6	1.2
Horsens	17.2	5.9	10.2	14.4	7.7	6.4	7.9	15.0	8.0	4.9	2.4
Ikast-Brande	13.8	3.7	8.4	8.8	8.1	4.2	8.9	25.2	15.3	2.1	1.4
Lemvig	13.3	3.2	7.2	13.5	6.3	4.4	7.6	26.1	15.4	2.0	1.0
Norddjurs	19.4	3.4	6.1	13.7	6.4	5.9	9.4	16.4	13.4	4.2	1.7
Odder	17.6	6.5	8.1	19.0	5.4	6.4	5.2	16.1	6.9	6.2	2.7
Randers	19.3	4.3	7.9	14.2	7.4	5.9	8.7	14.3	11.2	4.7	2.1
Ringkøbing-Skjern	11.9	3.0	11.0	9.3	7.2	4.3	6.4	26.6	17.9	1.4	0.9
Samsø	13.3	3.8	7.3	20.6	4.3	4.6	5.7	17.1	9.6	9.8	3.8
Silkeborg	14.5	6.7	9.9	16.1	7.8	6.8	5.8	16.9	8.9	4.4	2.3
Skanderborg	15.8	8.3	9.2	18.8	7.7	6.9	4.7	15.1	6.4	4.6	2.4
Skive	16.9	3.5	6.1	12.7	6.1	5.4	7.2	17.8	20.4	2.8	1.3
Struer	16.7	3.9	8.0	14.3	9.7	3.9	7.8	20.0	12.3	2.3	1.0
Syddjurs	15.6	5.6	7.9	18.4	5.9	6.6	6.4	14.2	10.0	6.2	3.1
Viborg	15.6	4.7	11.1	13.6	7.0	4.6	6.6	18.7	13.1	3.2	1.9
Aarhus	12.9	10.7	8.9	23.7	7.1	5.6	3.4	10.7	3.0	9.6	4.3
Assens	20.8	4.8	7.6	14.2	5.7	5.5	7.9	17.5	10.4	3.7	1.8
Billund	14.7	3.5	8.3	8.1	7.4	6.4	8.8	25.6	13.8	1.8	1.5
Esbjerg	18.2	4.3	8.1	13.3	9.1	4.8	7.9	19.5	9.3	3.9	1.7
Fanø	18.8	8.2	7.1	19.0	5.6	6.4	5.6	14.5	4.6	7.3	2.9
Fredericia	19.2	5.0	8.9	14.9	7.7	6.5	8.5	15.0	8.0	4.1	2.2
Faaborg-Midtfyn	20.8	5.0	7.0	16.0	5.3	5.9	7.4	16.2	10.0	4.5	1.9
Haderslev	17.5	4.1	8.8	11.2	7.1	5.1	9.4	21.2	10.9	3.2	1.4
Kerteminde	21.8	4.2	10.1	16.2	5.5	5.8	8.1	14.0	8.6	4.3	1.5
Kolding	14.4	6.0	9.2	14.2	8.8	5.5	7.1	21.7	7.3	4.0	1.8
Langeland	17.5	4.1	6.1	17.4	4.6	4.7	8.9	18.0	10.6	6.4	1.7
Middelfart	19.4	5.9	7.8	15.5	6.9	6.6	6.8	16.8	8.9	3.6	1.9
Nordfyn	20.6	3.9	7.2	13.5	5.4	5.9	7.9	18.9	12.6	2.8	1.4
Nyborg	20.7	4.9	6.6	16.8	5.7	6.5	7.4	15.8	9.3	4.5	1.7
Odense	18.3	8.2	9.5	19.2	6.5	5.9	5.4	11.4	4.1	8.1	3.5
Svendborg	18.6	5.6	6.3	20.7	5.4	6.0	6.1	13.0	6.6	9.2	2.5
Sønderborg	20.0	4.3	7.6	11.5	6.9	5.7	8.9	19.7	10.5	3.4	1.5
Tønder	15.8	2.5	7.3	9.0	6.7	4.5	8.5	27.0	15.4	2.1	1.3
Varde	14.3	2.9	8.6	8.7	6.7	4.6	7.8	28.7	14.6	1.8	1.2
Vejen	14.3	3.4	8.2	9.5	7.8	4.2	8.3	28.0	12.8	2.1	1.3
Vejle	15.9	6.0	11.8	13.9	7.8	6.1	6.8	18.4	7.8	3.6	1.9
Ærø	15.4	3.4	7.9	15.6	2.6	4.8	5.6	11.1	23.1	7.8	2.8
Aabenraa	17.6	3.6	7.6	9.6	7.1	4.9	9.7	22.7	13.4	2.6	1.3
Greve	16.7	5.7	10.2	11.6	8.5	8.1	9.0	19.2	5.1	4.1	1.8
Køge	15.8	6.0	9.9	16.7	7.4	7.5	8.4	15.2	6.1	4.8	2.1
Lejre	13.9	6.8	7.7	21.6	6.5	7.3	7.3	14.3	6.1	6.6	1.8
Roskilde	14.6	8.7	9.2	20.2	7.3	7.4	5.5	14.2	3.6	6.9	2.5
Solrød	15.1	6.0	10.2	13.1	11.4	8.0	7.6	18.3	5.3	3.0	2.0
Faxe	17.4	3.9	8.3	14.9	6.5	6.5	10.8	15.4	10.2	4.4	1.7
Guldborgsund	21.9	3.3	10.4	14.5	5.1	6.4	10.8	12.4	9.5	4.3	1.4
Holbæk	17.8	5.9	7.2	17.8	6.2	6.6	8.0	14.7	7.8	6.0	1.9
Kalundborg	18.7	3.9	6.9	14.2	5.6	5.8	11.2	15.8	11.5	4.8	1.7
Lolland	25.4	2.6	9.1	13.9	3.8	4.9	12.5	12.3	10.1	4.1	1.3
Næstved	19.3	4.4	8.5	15.3	7.0	7.2	9.3	14.1	8.2	4.7	2.0
Odsherred	17.7	4.4	5.9	16.4	4.8	5.9	11.3	14.7	10.3	6.5	2.1
Ringsted	15.3	4.9	12.2	16.1	6.8	6.3	7.9	15.4	7.8	5.1	2.2
Slagelse	19.1	4.2	8.3	13.5	6.6	6.7	9.9	16.2	8.7	4.7	2.0
Sorø	16.5	5.6	8.5	19.0	5.9	6.0	8.3	14.3	8.6	5.2	2.1
Stevns	16.7	4.9	7.7	15.7	6.5	7.4	9.5	14.8	9.6	5.1	1.9
Vordingborg	19.0	4.5	6.9	17.7	5.1	7.5	9.2	13.7	7.4	6.6	2.2
Albertslund	20.1	6.5	6.2	23.7	3.9	4.1	7.7	6.6	3.1	15.5	2.7
Allerød	12.0	10.5	12.4	17.9	8.6	8.5	4.0	17.3	2.5	4.2	2.1
Ballerup	20.6	7.0	8.9	19.7	5.9	6.5	7.7	10.2	3.3	7.2	3.1
Bornholm	20.0	4.2	8.0	15.6	4.1	5.0	7.7	18.0	7.8	7.3	2.2
Brøndby	22.5	5.0	6.8	17.5	5.1	5.4	10.2	8.3	4.7	11.9	2.5
København	9.7	11.8	6.2	27.7	5.8	4.4	3.0	6.3	1.1	18.5	5.6
Dragør	13.5	8.2	13.6	15.0	9.2	9.8	5.9	15.8	3.7	3.5	1.7
Egedal	15.5	7.6	10.2	17.1	8.0	8.0	7.1	15.1	4.7	4.6	2.2
Fredensborg	12.7	9.6	11.8	17.5	8.6	9.0	5.3	14.3	3.1	5.5	2.7
Frederiksberg	11.2	12.6	10.3	23.6	6.8	5.6	2.9	9.4	1.2	12.5	3.9
Frederikssund	15.7	5.6	7.7	17.1	7.8	7.7	9.7	15.2	6.1	5.5	2.0
Furesø	12.6	11.6	12.2	20.9	7.1	7.7	3.9	14.1	1.7	6.0	2.2
Gentofte	8.9	11.0	16.9	14.1	12.1	8.4	3.6	16.8	1.4	4.7	2.1
Gladsaxe	16.7	10.3	8.4	22.3	6.2	6.0	5.5	9.6	2.5	9.5	2.9
Glostrup	19.0	6.1	8.8	16.4	6.9	5.6	9.2	12.9	5.1	7.3	2.7
Gribskov	13.1	5.5	10.3	16.4	7.1	10.7	8.9	13.7	6.9	5.4	2.0
Halsnæs	18.3	4.6	6.6	19.6	5.5	7.1	9.8	11.5	6.7	7.3	3.0
Helsingør	14.4	8.2	12.1	19.1	7.9	8.3	6.4	10.5	3.4	7.0	2.7
Herlev	19.5	7.2	9.6	19.0	5.8	6.5	7.5	8.8	3.5	10.1	2.5
Hillerød	13.9	9.5	11.5	18.4	7.3	7.7	5.3	13.9	3.8	6.1	2.7
Hvidovre	19.0	7.0	8.6	21.7	5.4	5.9	8.4	8.4	3.8	9.0	2.7
Høje-Taastrup	17.5	6.8	11.6	15.4	6.5	6.0	8.8	11.6	4.7	8.7	2.4
Hørsholm	8.5	8.3	17.7	9.2	14.3	9.6	4.1	22.7	2.1	2.4	1.1
Ishøj	21.5	5.7	7.1	14.7	5.0	5.9	10.0	9.2	5.9	12.6	2.4
Lyngby-Taarbæk	11.4	12.3	13.4	19.8	8.7	7.7	3.9	13.8	1.4	5.1	2.5
Rudersdal	9.2	11.5	15.1	14.2	11.4	8.7	3.4	18.5	1.6	4.2	2.0
Rødovre	20.4	7.3	8.0	21.4	5.5	5.6	7.6	8.4	3.4	9.5	2.9
Tårnby	20.2	7.0	7.8	18.9	6.0	6.1	9.5	9.4	5.3	7.2	2.7
Vallensbæk	16.3	6.4	16.2	13.1	7.2	7.6	7.0	12.4	3.9	8.0	1.9
