= Results of the 2022 Danish general election in Denmark =

This is a list of the results in the 2022 Danish general election in Denmark. The results are as found on the official website dedicated to the results made by Statistics Denmark.

== Denmark ==
Division	A	B	C	D	F	I	K	M	O	Q	V	Æ	Ø	Å	Other	Red	Blue	None
Division	%	%	%	%	%	%	%	%	%	%	%	%	%	%	%	%	%	%
Denmark	27.5	3.8	5.5	3.7	8.3	7.9	0.5	9.3	2.6	0.9	13.3	8.1	5.1	3.3	0.1	48.9	41.7	9.3

== Vote share by electoral division ==
Division	A	B	C	D	F	I	K	M	O	Q	V	Æ	Ø	Å	Other	Red	Blue	None
Division	%	%	%	%	%	%	%	%	%	%	%	%	%	%	%	%	%	%
Mid & Northern Jutland	28.6	3.2	5.5	3.4	7.2	8.4	0.8	7.4	2.0	0.5	15.1	11.3	3.9	2.6	0.1	46.0	46.6	7.4
Zealand & Southern Denmark	30.2	2.5	4.8	4.8	8.0	6.9	0.4	10.1	3.4	0.6	13.7	9.2	3.3	2.0	0.1	46.6	42.2	10.1
Capital	23.1	6.0	6.3	2.6	9.8	8.5	0.3	10.4	2.6	1.7	10.9	3.3	8.6	5.8	0.1	55.0	33.4	10.4

== Vote share by constituency ==
Constituency	A	B	C	D	F	I	K	M	O	Q	V	Æ	Ø	Å	Other	Red	Blue	None
Constituency	%	%	%	%	%	%	%	%	%	%	%	%	%	%	%	%	%	%
North Jutland	34.0	2.4	4.4	3.5	5.7	7.1	0.4	6.3	1.9	0.3	14.0	15.2	3.0	1.9	0.1	47.2	46.5	6.3
West Jutland	25.3	1.9	8.1	3.1	6.4	7.8	1.5	6.8	2.0	0.2	19.4	13.6	2.3	1.5	0.1	37.6	55.5	6.8
East Jutland	26.8	4.6	4.7	3.5	9.0	9.8	0.5	8.7	2.0	0.8	13.1	7.0	5.7	3.8	0.1	50.6	40.6	8.7
South Jutland	28.4	2.3	4.8	6.2	5.8	7.6	0.7	9.3	2.8	0.4	16.5	11.3	2.4	1.4	0.1	40.7	49.9	9.3
Funen	32.5	3.0	5.2	3.5	8.2	6.4	0.4	9.9	2.6	0.9	11.8	8.2	4.7	2.7	0.1	52.0	38.0	9.9
Zealand	30.3	2.4	4.5	4.4	9.8	6.6	0.2	10.8	4.3	0.5	12.6	8.1	3.3	1.9	0.2	48.2	40.8	10.8
North Zealand	23.9	4.9	7.7	3.9	7.8	9.4	0.3	11.8	2.6	0.6	14.7	4.8	4.2	3.3	0.1	44.7	43.4	11.8
Greater Copenhagen	27.6	5.1	7.2	2.9	9.5	8.0	0.4	10.8	3.7	2.3	10.2	3.8	5.4	3.0	0.1	52.9	36.2	10.8
Copenhagen	19.0	7.5	5.0	1.7	11.5	8.4	0.2	9.4	1.6	2.2	8.4	1.8	13.8	9.4	0.2	63.3	27.1	9.4
Bornholm	35.3	1.0	3.7	2.1	6.4	3.6	2.0	6.1	6.3	0.2	18.7	6.4	5.2	2.7	0.2	50.8	43.0	6.1

== Vote share by nomination district ==
Nomination District	A	B	C	D	F	I	K	M	O	Q	V	Æ	Ø	Å	Other	Red	Blue	None
Nomination District	%	%	%	%	%	%	%	%	%	%	%	%	%	%	%	%	%	%
Frederikshavn	39.0	1.0	3.8	4.7	4.1	5.7	0.5	6.1	2.7	0.1	12.6	17.1	1.7	0.9	0.1	46.8	47.1	6.1
Hjørring	35.2	1.5	5.3	4.2	4.8	5.8	0.5	6.3	2.0	0.1	13.6	16.7	2.5	1.2	0.1	45.4	48.2	6.3
Brønderslev	35.8	1.3	3.7	4.2	4.5	6.1	0.5	5.7	2.2	0.1	14.9	17.9	1.7	1.2	0.1	44.6	49.6	5.7
Thisted	34.3	1.2	4.0	3.2	3.9	5.5	0.7	5.3	2.0	0.1	16.4	19.2	2.3	1.8	0.0	43.5	51.1	5.3
Himmerland	29.0	2.0	5.3	4.1	6.9	5.9	0.4	5.5	1.8	0.1	16.5	19.1	1.9	1.4	0.1	41.3	53.1	5.5
Mariagerfjord	33.0	1.5	5.0	3.5	4.9	5.8	0.4	5.2	1.8	0.1	11.7	23.3	2.3	1.5	0.1	43.2	51.4	5.2
Aalborg East	34.6	4.4	4.0	2.4	7.4	9.0	0.4	7.1	1.5	0.8	11.7	8.9	4.8	3.1	0.1	54.9	37.9	7.1
Aalborg West	31.2	4.0	5.1	2.4	7.2	9.5	0.3	7.9	1.4	0.3	14.7	9.3	4.1	2.5	0.1	49.4	42.6	7.9
Aalborg North	33.8	3.7	3.8	2.8	6.5	9.1	0.3	6.8	1.9	0.5	13.3	10.2	4.5	2.6	0.1	51.6	41.5	6.8
Struer	27.5	1.7	5.6	3.2	5.9	6.5	1.3	5.0	2.3	0.2	22.7	15.3	1.6	1.0	0.1	37.9	57.0	5.0
Skive	31.1	1.3	5.6	2.9	6.3	6.3	0.7	5.2	2.0	0.2	13.9	21.5	1.8	1.0	0.1	41.7	53.0	5.2
Viborg West	27.1	1.9	15.4	3.0	8.4	6.6	0.5	5.8	1.7	0.1	13.6	10.9	2.9	2.0	0.1	42.4	51.6	5.8
Viborg East	24.9	1.7	16.5	3.3	6.4	6.6	0.9	5.3	1.9	0.1	16.1	12.4	1.9	1.7	0.1	36.8	57.8	5.3
Silkeborg North	24.9	2.5	7.3	3.6	7.6	8.3	1.3	8.7	1.9	0.2	17.8	10.5	3.1	2.2	0.2	40.4	50.6	8.7
Silkeborg South	26.6	3.5	7.3	2.4	8.8	9.0	0.6	10.0	1.8	0.3	16.2	6.5	4.5	2.5	0.2	46.1	43.6	10.0
Ikast	23.6	1.5	7.2	3.9	4.4	8.0	1.5	7.4	2.7	0.3	19.7	16.7	1.7	1.2	0.1	32.8	59.7	7.4
Herning South	23.2	2.1	6.8	3.0	5.4	10.6	1.9	8.3	2.2	0.4	19.9	12.5	2.3	1.3	0.1	34.7	56.8	8.3
Herning North	21.9	1.6	6.5	2.9	5.2	8.6	2.8	7.3	1.9	0.4	23.0	15.4	1.5	1.0	0.1	31.5	61.1	7.3
Holstebro	26.8	1.7	5.2	2.6	6.6	8.2	1.2	5.2	2.2	0.3	24.5	12.4	2.0	1.1	0.1	38.5	56.2	5.2
Ringkøbing	20.8	1.1	6.3	3.5	4.6	7.1	4.2	6.4	1.8	0.1	25.0	16.7	1.3	0.9	0.1	29.0	64.5	6.4
Aarhus South	24.1	6.2	5.0	2.1	11.4	9.8	0.4	9.5	1.4	0.5	13.2	3.7	7.3	5.2	0.1	54.7	35.7	9.5
Aarhus West	27.0	5.4	4.3	2.7	10.4	8.9	0.6	8.4	1.6	3.7	10.8	4.6	7.3	4.2	0.1	58.0	33.6	8.4
Aarhus North	22.3	8.0	4.2	2.0	12.9	9.7	0.6	8.3	1.2	1.6	9.9	3.1	10.0	6.2	0.1	61.0	30.6	8.3
Aarhus East	18.2	8.0	5.2	1.7	11.2	13.3	0.3	10.4	0.9	0.6	12.5	2.5	8.9	6.2	0.1	53.0	36.5	10.4
Djurs	31.4	2.2	3.7	5.3	6.8	8.7	0.3	7.2	2.6	0.2	12.6	11.6	4.1	3.3	0.1	47.9	44.8	7.2
Randers North	36.3	1.9	3.3	5.0	6.0	8.1	0.6	6.3	3.4	0.4	13.1	10.9	3.1	1.5	0.1	49.3	44.4	6.3
Randers South	32.6	2.2	4.0	4.8	6.8	9.5	0.7	7.0	2.7	0.2	15.2	9.2	3.4	1.9	0.1	47.0	45.9	7.0
Favrskov	28.6	3.5	6.2	4.9	7.4	8.1	0.4	8.4	2.3	0.2	15.0	9.8	3.1	2.1	0.1	44.7	46.8	8.4
Skanderborg	27.4	4.0	5.4	3.6	9.5	9.0	0.4	9.4	1.7	0.2	14.0	7.3	4.3	3.6	0.1	49.2	41.4	9.4
Horsens	30.8	2.8	4.9	4.3	6.5	10.0	0.5	9.2	2.7	0.4	13.3	9.0	3.5	1.9	0.1	46.0	44.8	9.2
Hedensted	25.4	1.7	4.3	5.9	4.1	9.6	1.7	9.0	2.7	0.2	18.5	13.9	1.8	1.2	0.1	34.4	56.5	9.0
Sønderborg	33.5	2.1	3.8	7.0	4.7	6.5	0.5	8.4	2.9	0.5	15.2	11.3	2.2	1.2	0.1	44.3	47.2	8.4
Aabenraa	28.8	2.0	4.6	7.9	4.3	6.6	0.7	8.1	3.4	0.2	15.9	14.2	1.8	1.1	0.1	38.3	53.5	8.1
Tønder	26.2	1.3	4.6	7.9	5.0	5.6	0.9	12.6	3.0	0.1	15.3	14.9	1.6	0.8	0.1	35.1	52.2	12.6
City of Esbjerg	33.5	2.5	5.2	5.2	7.4	7.9	0.5	8.0	3.0	0.6	12.1	8.5	3.8	1.7	0.1	49.5	42.4	8.0
Greater Esbjerg	28.1	2.0	4.6	6.2	5.9	8.2	0.6	9.6	2.6	0.1	17.3	11.5	1.9	1.2	0.0	39.3	51.1	9.6
Varde	24.2	1.5	5.2	6.5	4.0	6.8	0.9	8.4	2.6	0.1	23.2	14.2	1.5	1.0	0.0	32.2	59.3	8.4
Vejen	25.4	1.6	4.5	7.3	4.2	7.3	0.7	8.4	2.9	0.1	21.1	13.8	1.5	1.0	0.1	33.8	57.7	8.4
Vejle North	23.8	3.3	5.8	4.5	6.7	8.3	0.9	10.6	2.0	0.8	18.5	10.5	2.4	1.9	0.1	38.9	50.5	10.6
Vejle South	27.1	3.3	5.0	4.6	7.3	8.5	0.7	10.1	2.1	0.7	16.6	8.8	3.2	2.0	0.1	43.6	46.2	10.1
Fredericia	33.6	2.1	4.7	5.3	6.7	7.9	0.6	10.1	2.9	0.4	11.2	9.4	3.3	1.8	0.1	47.8	42.0	10.1
Kolding North	24.5	3.4	5.6	5.1	7.3	9.9	0.5	11.0	2.7	1.0	15.4	8.7	2.9	1.9	0.1	41.0	47.9	11.0
Kolding South	26.8	3.0	5.3	6.0	7.4	8.9	0.9	9.6	3.1	0.3	14.4	10.2	2.5	1.6	0.0	41.6	48.7	9.6
Haderslev	30.3	1.8	4.3	7.6	4.9	6.3	1.0	8.2	3.5	0.3	16.6	11.3	2.4	1.4	0.1	41.2	50.5	8.2
Odense East	30.2	4.7	4.9	2.4	10.5	7.1	0.4	9.6	2.1	4.2	8.7	4.4	7.1	3.8	0.1	60.4	29.9	9.6
Odense West	32.2	3.6	5.8	2.8	9.2	7.4	0.3	10.4	2.3	0.8	10.9	6.0	5.2	3.1	0.1	54.1	35.5	10.4
Odense South	27.5	4.3	7.5	2.3	9.2	8.1	0.4	12.3	1.9	0.9	12.4	5.0	5.0	3.0	0.1	49.9	37.7	12.3
Assens	34.5	1.8	4.3	4.7	6.5	5.2	0.4	8.2	3.2	0.2	15.5	10.6	2.8	2.0	0.1	47.8	43.9	8.2
Middelfart	32.6	2.1	4.8	4.7	6.8	6.5	0.4	9.9	3.0	0.2	13.4	11.6	2.4	1.6	0.1	45.7	44.4	9.9
Nyborg	36.1	2.0	5.2	4.4	7.2	5.6	0.3	9.2	2.9	0.5	11.8	9.7	3.4	1.7	0.1	50.8	39.9	9.2
Svendborg	34.7	2.5	3.9	3.3	8.3	5.6	0.3	9.3	2.7	0.4	10.4	8.3	6.4	3.8	0.2	56.1	34.5	9.3
Faaborg	33.4	2.1	4.7	4.0	7.1	5.1	0.4	9.5	2.9	0.3	12.8	11.3	3.8	2.4	0.1	49.1	41.3	9.5
Lolland	43.6	0.8	3.0	4.4	6.3	3.7	0.2	7.4	5.8	0.2	10.1	10.4	2.7	1.1	0.2	54.8	37.6	7.4
Guldborgsund	36.2	1.3	3.9	4.0	8.1	4.5	0.3	9.2	8.8	0.2	10.1	8.8	3.0	1.4	0.2	50.3	40.4	9.2
Vordingborg	33.5	2.0	3.7	4.3	10.2	5.5	0.2	11.6	4.3	0.3	9.5	7.4	4.3	3.0	0.3	53.2	34.9	11.6
Næstved	32.8	2.1	5.3	4.9	8.6	7.0	0.2	10.7	4.2	0.3	10.9	8.2	2.9	1.6	0.2	48.3	40.8	10.7
Faxe	28.8	1.9	4.7	5.6	9.5	6.5	0.2	10.9	4.5	0.2	12.0	10.5	2.8	1.8	0.2	45.0	43.9	10.9
Køge	24.9	2.8	4.9	3.7	14.0	7.5	0.3	11.5	3.4	0.6	13.8	7.1	3.1	2.2	0.1	47.6	40.7	11.5
Greve	25.2	2.7	5.1	3.7	7.3	9.5	0.2	13.1	3.9	1.0	18.6	6.1	2.1	1.3	0.1	39.6	47.3	13.1
Roskilde	25.0	4.6	5.4	2.8	12.4	8.6	0.2	12.8	2.6	0.6	12.2	4.6	5.1	3.1	0.1	50.8	36.3	12.8
Holbæk	31.2	2.3	3.8	4.1	11.7	6.5	0.3	10.9	3.6	0.6	11.7	7.6	3.4	1.9	0.1	51.2	37.7	10.9
Kalundborg	32.1	1.7	3.1	6.2	8.2	5.0	0.2	9.6	5.1	0.3	12.4	10.5	3.4	2.0	0.3	47.6	42.5	9.6
Ringsted	28.4	2.6	6.8	4.6	9.8	6.1	0.3	10.5	3.6	0.6	12.3	8.3	3.5	2.3	0.2	47.3	42.1	10.5
Slagelse	31.9	1.8	3.8	4.9	8.0	6.3	0.2	9.9	3.9	0.8	14.8	9.2	2.9	1.4	0.2	46.8	43.2	9.9
Helsingør	27.8	4.7	7.5	4.0	7.7	8.4	0.2	10.9	2.5	1.1	10.7	4.7	5.3	4.3	0.1	50.8	38.2	10.9
Fredensborg	18.8	5.5	10.1	3.5	6.4	12.7	0.3	12.7	2.3	0.7	17.2	3.6	3.2	3.0	0.1	37.7	49.5	12.7
Hillerød	24.1	3.9	6.2	4.7	8.2	8.2	0.6	13.0	2.9	0.5	13.7	6.1	4.5	3.5	0.1	44.6	42.3	13.0
Frederikssund	31.1	2.3	4.6	5.4	8.0	6.5	0.2	9.8	4.1	0.3	13.2	7.4	4.4	2.8	0.1	48.8	41.3	9.8
Egedal	25.7	5.4	7.1	3.0	8.7	8.7	0.2	11.7	2.5	0.6	14.9	4.0	4.4	3.1	0.1	47.9	40.4	11.7
Rudersdal	16.2	7.9	11.3	2.6	7.2	12.6	0.2	12.5	1.5	0.4	18.2	2.5	3.7	3.3	0.1	38.6	48.9	12.5
Gentofte	12.7	6.7	14.6	2.1	6.1	14.4	0.2	14.4	2.0	0.4	16.8	1.7	4.0	3.8	0.1	33.8	51.7	14.4
Lyngby	19.1	7.7	10.4	2.2	10.6	10.4	0.2	13.5	2.2	0.6	12.8	1.8	4.6	3.9	0.1	46.5	39.9	13.5
Gladsaxe	27.7	6.4	4.8	2.4	11.6	7.3	0.3	10.9	3.2	1.8	9.5	3.1	6.9	3.9	0.1	58.3	30.7	10.9
Rødovre	33.4	4.0	5.1	3.2	10.0	6.3	0.5	9.7	4.0	2.2	8.1	4.2	6.3	2.9	0.1	58.8	31.4	9.7
Hvidovre	32.3	4.3	4.6	3.1	11.4	6.1	0.3	9.7	4.7	2.4	8.1	4.6	5.5	2.8	0.1	58.6	31.5	9.7
Brøndby	33.1	3.5	5.3	3.7	8.2	5.8	0.5	8.9	4.9	5.7	8.1	5.4	5.3	1.5	0.1	57.2	33.7	8.9
Taastrup	30.8	4.1	6.9	3.6	10.2	5.9	0.5	8.5	4.2	3.9	7.7	5.1	6.1	2.3	0.1	57.5	33.9	8.5
Ballerup	34.6	3.6	4.6	3.3	9.2	6.7	0.4	9.9	4.4	1.7	9.5	4.6	4.5	2.7	0.1	56.4	33.6	9.9
Østerbro	17.3	8.6	5.7	1.4	11.3	10.3	0.2	11.1	1.2	1.1	9.8	1.2	11.5	9.0	0.1	58.9	29.8	11.1
Sundbyvester	19.1	7.6	4.4	1.8	11.8	9.2	0.2	9.7	1.5	2.6	8.5	1.9	12.9	8.8	0.2	62.7	27.4	9.7
Inner City	13.9	8.6	5.7	1.1	10.1	11.3	0.2	11.0	0.8	0.9	9.4	1.0	14.3	11.6	0.2	59.3	29.5	11.0
Sundbyøster	20.9	7.2	4.2	2.0	12.1	8.3	0.3	9.6	1.7	1.4	8.1	2.1	12.8	9.3	0.2	63.6	26.6	9.6
Nørrebro	12.5	8.8	2.5	0.8	12.6	5.5	0.2	7.2	0.8	4.1	5.1	0.8	23.7	15.3	0.2	76.9	15.7	7.2
Bispebjerg	17.8	6.8	3.0	1.6	12.5	5.5	0.3	6.7	1.8	4.6	5.4	1.8	20.8	11.2	0.2	73.7	19.5	6.7
Brønshøj	23.0	6.7	4.2	1.7	13.4	6.4	0.3	8.2	2.0	3.8	7.2	2.1	13.1	7.6	0.2	67.6	24.0	8.2
Valby	20.8	7.1	4.6	1.9	12.4	8.6	0.2	9.1	1.7	2.6	8.8	2.1	12.1	7.9	0.2	62.9	27.8	9.1
Vesterbro	14.8	8.6	3.9	1.4	11.8	9.3	0.1	9.4	1.0	1.7	7.7	1.2	16.7	12.3	0.2	65.8	24.7	9.4
Falkoner	17.0	8.8	8.1	1.2	10.8	9.4	0.2	11.1	1.1	1.0	10.4	1.3	10.8	8.7	0.1	57.1	31.7	11.1
Slots	20.3	7.1	8.9	1.5	9.7	9.2	0.3	9.9	1.6	1.6	10.7	2.0	10.5	6.5	0.2	55.7	34.1	9.9
Tårnby	33.0	2.9	6.3	3.7	7.9	7.6	0.2	10.1	4.0	1.0	10.7	5.4	4.4	2.7	0.1	51.9	37.9	10.1
Rønne	37.9	0.9	3.9	2.1	6.5	3.5	1.8	6.1	6.6	0.2	17.8	5.9	4.4	2.3	0.2	52.1	41.6	6.1
Aakirkeby	32.7	1.2	3.6	2.2	6.4	3.7	2.3	6.0	5.9	0.2	19.7	6.9	6.0	3.0	0.2	49.4	44.3	6.0

== Vote share by region ==
Region	A	B	C	D	F	I	K	M	O	Q	V	Æ	Ø	Å	Other	Red	Blue	None
Region	%	%	%	%	%	%	%	%	%	%	%	%	%	%	%	%	%	%
North Denmark	34.0	2.4	4.4	3.5	5.7	7.1	0.4	6.3	1.9	0.3	14.0	15.2	3.0	1.9	0.1	47.2	46.5	6.3
Central Denmark	26.2	3.6	6.0	3.4	8.0	9.0	0.9	7.9	2.0	0.6	15.6	9.6	4.4	2.9	0.1	45.5	46.4	7.9
Southern Denmark	30.1	2.6	5.0	5.1	6.8	7.1	0.6	9.6	2.7	0.6	14.5	10.0	3.3	2.0	0.1	45.4	44.9	9.6
Zealand	30.3	2.4	4.5	4.4	9.8	6.6	0.2	10.8	4.3	0.5	12.6	8.1	3.3	1.9	0.2	48.2	40.8	10.8
Capital	23.1	6.0	6.3	2.6	9.8	8.5	0.3	10.4	2.6	1.7	10.9	3.3	8.6	5.8	0.1	55.0	34.5	10.4

== Vote share by Municipality ==
Municipality	A	B	C	D	F	I	K	M	O	Q	V	Æ	Ø	Å	Other	Red	Blue	None
Municipality	%	%	%	%	%	%	%	%	%	%	%	%	%	%	%	%	%	%
Brønderslev	36.0	1.6	4.1	3.7	4.7	6.7	0.4	6.0	2.1	0.1	15.0	16.7	1.7	1.1	0.1	45.2	48.8	6.0
Frederikshavn	39.5	1.0	3.7	4.6	4.0	5.8	0.5	6.1	2.6	0.1	12.5	17.0	1.7	0.9	0.1	47.1	46.7	6.1
Hjørring	35.2	1.5	5.3	4.2	4.8	5.8	0.5	6.3	2.0	0.1	13.6	16.7	2.5	1.2	0.1	45.4	48.2	6.3
Jammerbugt	35.6	1.0	3.2	4.9	4.1	5.2	0.7	5.4	2.4	0.1	14.8	19.5	1.7	1.4	0.1	43.9	50.7	5.4
Læsø	26.2	0.8	6.1	6.9	5.0	4.1	0.7	6.2	4.7	0.2	14.9	20.0	2.6	1.6	0.0	36.4	57.4	6.2
Mariagerfjord	33.0	1.5	5.0	3.5	4.9	5.8	0.4	5.2	1.8	0.1	11.7	23.3	2.3	1.5	0.1	43.2	51.4	5.2
Morsø	36.5	1.0	2.9	2.9	3.6	4.7	0.4	5.1	2.3	0.1	15.3	22.1	1.9	1.0	0.0	44.1	50.7	5.1
Rebild	30.2	2.9	5.3	3.7	6.0	6.8	0.4	6.5	1.3	0.2	15.3	16.9	2.6	1.9	0.1	43.9	49.6	6.5
Thisted	33.2	1.3	4.5	3.4	4.1	5.9	0.8	5.4	1.9	0.1	16.9	17.8	2.5	2.1	0.1	43.2	51.3	5.4
Vesthimmerland	27.9	1.2	5.4	4.5	7.7	5.0	0.4	4.7	2.3	0.1	17.6	21.0	1.3	0.9	0.1	39.0	56.2	4.7
Aalborg	33.3	4.1	4.3	2.5	7.0	9.2	0.4	7.2	1.6	0.5	13.1	9.4	4.5	2.7	0.1	52.2	40.5	7.2
Favrskov	28.6	3.5	6.2	4.9	7.4	8.1	0.4	8.4	2.3	0.2	15.0	9.8	3.1	2.1	0.1	44.7	46.8	8.4
Hedensted	25.4	1.7	4.3	5.9	4.1	9.6	1.7	9.0	2.7	0.2	18.5	13.9	1.8	1.2	0.1	34.4	56.5	9.0
Herning	22.5	1.8	6.6	3.0	5.3	9.5	2.4	7.8	2.0	0.4	21.6	14.0	1.9	1.1	0.1	33.0	59.1	7.8
Holstebro	26.8	1.7	5.2	2.6	6.6	8.2	1.2	5.2	2.2	0.3	24.5	12.4	2.0	1.1	0.1	38.5	56.2	5.2
Horsens	30.8	2.8	4.9	4.3	6.5	10.0	0.5	9.2	2.7	0.4	13.3	9.0	3.5	1.9	0.1	46.0	44.8	9.2
Ikast-Brande	23.6	1.5	7.2	3.9	4.4	8.0	1.5	7.4	2.7	0.3	19.7	16.7	1.7	1.2	0.1	32.8	59.7	7.4
Lemvig	24.4	2.0	5.7	3.5	5.4	6.1	1.3	4.7	2.3	0.1	25.3	16.7	1.4	1.1	0.1	34.3	60.9	4.7
Norddjurs	34.8	1.5	3.1	6.1	5.2	9.8	0.4	5.9	2.8	0.2	12.0	12.9	3.2	1.8	0.1	46.8	47.1	5.9
Odder	29.5	3.3	5.0	3.5	10.0	7.4	0.5	8.7	1.7	0.2	13.8	7.7	5.0	3.6	0.1	51.6	39.7	8.7
Randers	34.3	2.0	3.7	4.9	6.4	8.8	0.6	6.6	3.0	0.3	14.2	10.0	3.3	1.7	0.1	48.1	45.2	6.6
Ringkøbing-Skjern	20.8	1.1	6.3	3.5	4.6	7.1	4.2	6.4	1.8	0.1	25.0	16.7	1.3	0.9	0.1	29.0	64.5	6.4
Samsø	25.2	2.1	16.3	2.7	10.9	5.2	0.2	6.0	1.4	0.1	9.1	8.0	6.8	5.8	0.2	50.8	43.0	6.0
Silkeborg	25.8	3.0	7.3	2.9	8.2	8.6	0.9	9.4	1.8	0.2	16.9	8.4	3.8	2.3	0.2	43.4	47.0	9.4
Skanderborg	26.8	4.4	4.9	3.6	9.3	9.8	0.4	9.9	1.8	0.3	14.4	7.0	3.9	3.5	0.1	48.2	41.9	9.9
Skive	31.1	1.3	5.6	2.9	6.3	6.3	0.7	5.2	2.0	0.2	13.9	21.5	1.8	1.0	0.1	41.7	53.0	5.2
Struer	30.4	1.5	5.6	2.8	6.5	7.0	1.2	5.3	2.3	0.2	20.3	14.1	1.8	1.0	0.1	41.4	53.2	5.3
Syddjurs	28.6	2.8	4.2	4.6	8.0	7.8	0.3	8.2	2.4	0.2	13.1	10.4	4.8	4.5	0.1	48.8	42.9	8.2
Viborg	26.1	1.8	15.9	3.1	7.5	6.6	0.7	5.6	1.8	0.1	14.8	11.7	2.4	1.9	0.1	39.8	54.5	5.6
Aarhus	22.5	7.0	4.7	2.1	11.4	10.7	0.5	9.3	1.3	1.5	11.7	3.4	8.4	5.5	0.1	56.4	34.3	9.3
Assens	34.5	1.8	4.3	4.7	6.5	5.2	0.4	8.2	3.2	0.2	15.5	10.6	2.8	2.0	0.1	47.8	43.9	8.2
Billund	25.7	1.6	3.8	6.1	3.2	6.7	0.9	8.6	2.7	0.1	23.3	14.9	1.3	0.9	0.1	32.9	58.5	8.6
Esbjerg	31.0	2.3	4.8	5.8	6.6	8.1	0.5	8.8	2.8	0.4	14.8	10.0	2.8	1.3	0.1	44.3	46.8	8.8
Fanø	29.6	3.4	7.8	3.4	9.3	6.0	0.4	9.3	1.5	0.0	8.7	8.4	6.7	5.2	0.2	54.2	36.3	9.3
Fredericia	33.6	2.1	4.7	5.3	6.7	7.9	0.6	10.1	2.9	0.4	11.2	9.4	3.3	1.8	0.1	47.8	42.0	10.1
Faaborg-Midtfyn	33.9	2.2	4.5	4.2	7.2	5.3	0.4	9.6	2.9	0.3	13.1	10.5	3.5	2.3	0.1	49.3	41.0	9.6
Haderslev	30.3	1.8	4.3	7.6	4.9	6.3	1.0	8.2	3.5	0.3	16.6	11.3	2.4	1.4	0.1	41.2	50.5	8.2
Kerteminde	37.4	1.8	6.8	4.8	6.6	5.4	0.4	9.3	2.8	0.5	9.9	9.2	3.3	1.6	0.1	51.2	39.4	9.3
Kolding	25.7	3.2	5.4	5.6	7.4	9.4	0.7	10.2	2.9	0.6	14.9	9.5	2.7	1.7	0.1	41.3	48.4	10.2
Langeland	36.1	1.4	3.2	3.8	6.8	4.1	0.4	8.1	3.5	0.3	13.9	12.2	3.7	2.5	0.2	50.7	41.0	8.1
Middelfart	31.5	2.7	5.0	4.3	7.4	7.4	0.4	10.6	2.7	0.2	12.8	10.3	2.7	1.9	0.1	46.4	42.9	10.6
Nordfyn	34.1	1.4	4.5	5.3	5.9	5.4	0.3	8.8	3.4	0.1	14.2	13.3	2.0	1.2	0.1	44.7	46.4	8.8
Nyborg	35.1	2.2	4.0	4.0	7.6	5.8	0.3	9.1	3.0	0.4	13.2	10.0	3.5	1.8	0.1	50.5	40.3	9.1
Odense	29.8	4.2	6.1	2.5	9.6	7.6	0.4	10.8	2.1	1.9	10.7	5.1	5.8	3.3	0.1	54.7	34.4	10.8
Svendborg	34.4	2.8	4.1	3.2	8.6	5.9	0.3	9.5	2.5	0.4	9.7	7.5	7.0	4.0	0.2	57.2	33.1	9.5
Sønderborg	33.5	2.1	3.8	7.0	4.7	6.5	0.5	8.4	2.9	0.5	15.2	11.3	2.2	1.2	0.1	44.3	47.2	8.4
Tønder	26.2	1.3	4.6	7.9	5.0	5.6	0.9	12.6	3.0	0.1	15.3	14.9	1.6	0.8	0.1	35.1	52.2	12.6
Varde	24.2	1.5	5.2	6.5	4.0	6.8	0.9	8.4	2.6	0.1	23.2	14.2	1.5	1.0	0.0	32.2	59.3	8.4
Vejen	25.2	1.6	4.9	8.1	4.8	7.7	0.6	8.3	3.1	0.1	19.7	13.1	1.6	1.0	0.1	34.4	57.2	8.3
Vejle	25.5	3.3	5.4	4.5	7.0	8.4	0.8	10.3	2.1	0.7	17.6	9.6	2.8	2.0	0.1	41.3	48.3	10.3
Ærø	29.8	1.6	6.7	2.5	6.0	3.6	0.6	8.3	2.6	0.3	9.6	18.1	6.6	3.5	0.2	47.8	43.8	8.3
Aabenraa	28.8	2.0	4.6	7.9	4.3	6.6	0.7	8.1	3.4	0.2	15.9	14.2	1.8	1.1	0.1	38.3	53.5	8.1
Faxe	30.0	1.5	4.1	5.9	9.2	6.7	0.3	10.8	4.7	0.2	11.6	10.5	2.6	1.7	0.2	45.2	43.7	10.8
Greve	26.3	2.7	4.8	3.7	6.7	8.5	0.3	12.7	4.0	1.3	19.3	6.2	2.2	1.2	0.1	40.5	46.7	12.7
Guldborgsund	36.2	1.3	3.9	4.0	8.1	4.5	0.3	9.2	8.8	0.2	10.1	8.8	3.0	1.4	0.2	50.3	40.4	9.2
Holbæk	31.2	2.3	3.8	4.1	11.7	6.5	0.3	10.9	3.6	0.6	11.7	7.6	3.4	1.9	0.1	51.2	37.7	10.9
Kalundborg	31.0	1.7	3.1	7.0	7.8	5.1	0.2	9.4	5.0	0.3	13.4	11.2	3.0	1.5	0.3	45.3	45.0	9.4
Køge	25.3	2.4	5.2	3.6	14.3	7.7	0.2	11.5	3.4	0.7	14.1	7.1	2.5	1.7	0.1	47.0	41.4	11.5
Lejre	24.1	3.6	4.3	3.9	13.4	7.1	0.3	11.6	3.4	0.3	13.1	7.2	4.4	3.2	0.1	48.9	39.4	11.6
Lolland	43.6	0.8	3.0	4.4	6.3	3.7	0.2	7.4	5.8	0.2	10.1	10.4	2.7	1.1	0.2	54.8	37.6	7.4
Næstved	32.8	2.1	5.3	4.9	8.6	7.0	0.2	10.7	4.2	0.3	10.9	8.2	2.9	1.6	0.2	48.3	40.8	10.7
Odsherred	33.5	1.7	3.1	5.1	8.7	4.9	0.2	10.0	5.1	0.2	11.0	9.5	4.0	2.6	0.3	50.7	39.0	10.0
Ringsted	27.4	2.5	8.4	4.3	9.5	6.2	0.3	10.6	3.4	1.0	12.7	7.9	3.5	2.0	0.2	45.9	43.4	10.6
Roskilde	25.0	4.6	5.4	2.8	12.4	8.6	0.2	12.8	2.6	0.6	12.2	4.6	5.1	3.1	0.1	50.8	36.3	12.8
Slagelse	31.9	1.8	3.8	4.9	8.0	6.3	0.2	9.9	3.9	0.8	14.8	9.2	2.9	1.4	0.2	46.8	43.2	9.9
Solrød	23.2	2.6	5.7	3.7	8.4	11.6	0.1	13.9	3.9	0.2	17.2	6.1	1.9	1.4	0.1	37.8	48.3	13.9
Sorø	29.6	2.7	5.2	4.8	10.2	6.0	0.3	10.4	3.7	0.2	11.8	8.7	3.4	2.6	0.2	48.8	40.6	10.4
Stevns	27.0	2.4	5.6	5.1	10.0	6.2	0.2	11.1	4.2	0.2	12.5	10.3	3.0	1.9	0.2	44.6	44.1	11.1
Vordingborg	33.5	2.0	3.7	4.3	10.2	5.5	0.2	11.6	4.3	0.3	9.5	7.4	4.3	3.0	0.3	53.2	34.9	11.6
Albertslund	33.6	3.9	3.6	3.0	13.7	4.4	0.5	6.9	4.1	4.8	5.1	3.9	9.1	3.1	0.2	68.3	24.6	6.9
Allerød	20.5	7.0	8.8	3.1	8.7	9.6	0.3	12.1	1.6	0.4	17.8	3.5	3.6	2.8	0.1	43.1	44.7	12.1
Ballerup	35.4	3.9	4.6	3.2	9.7	6.3	0.4	9.5	4.2	1.4	9.0	4.4	4.7	3.0	0.2	58.2	32.1	9.5
Bornholm	35.3	1.0	3.7	2.1	6.4	3.6	2.0	6.1	6.3	0.2	18.7	6.4	5.2	2.7	0.2	50.8	43.0	6.1
Brøndby	36.4	3.1	3.7	3.9	8.7	5.2	0.6	7.6	5.2	5.6	7.1	5.2	6.0	1.5	0.2	61.3	30.9	7.6
Dragør	23.5	3.5	11.6	2.8	7.0	10.5	0.1	14.0	2.8	0.3	13.4	4.6	2.9	2.7	0.1	39.9	45.9	14.0
Egedal	27.3	3.4	6.1	3.8	8.3	8.6	0.2	11.8	3.2	0.5	15.5	5.5	3.4	2.4	0.1	45.3	42.9	11.8
Fredensborg	22.4	5.8	8.0	3.5	8.0	9.7	0.4	11.9	2.4	0.9	14.9	4.0	4.1	3.8	0.1	45.1	43.0	11.9
Frederiksberg	18.6	8.0	8.5	1.3	10.3	9.3	0.2	10.5	1.3	1.3	10.6	1.6	10.6	7.7	0.1	56.5	32.9	10.5
Frederikssund	29.3	2.7	5.0	5.4	7.7	7.4	0.2	10.1	4.3	0.3	14.6	6.9	3.9	2.2	0.1	46.1	43.8	10.1
Furesø	23.8	7.7	8.3	2.2	9.1	8.8	0.2	11.5	1.8	0.7	14.2	2.4	5.5	4.0	0.1	50.7	37.7	11.5
Gentofte	12.7	6.7	14.6	2.1	6.1	14.4	0.2	14.4	2.0	0.4	16.8	1.7	4.0	3.8	0.1	33.8	51.7	14.4
Gladsaxe	27.7	6.4	4.8	2.4	11.6	7.3	0.3	10.9	3.2	1.8	9.5	3.1	6.9	3.9	0.1	58.3	30.7	10.9
Glostrup	32.8	3.1	4.8	3.6	8.1	7.6	0.3	10.9	4.9	2.3	10.5	5.1	4.1	1.9	0.1	52.3	36.7	10.9
Gribskov	24.5	2.7	5.8	5.8	6.7	7.5	0.6	14.2	3.8	0.2	12.8	8.0	3.9	3.2	0.2	41.3	44.3	14.2
Halsnæs	33.7	1.8	4.0	5.3	8.4	5.2	0.2	9.3	3.8	0.2	11.1	8.0	5.1	3.7	0.1	52.9	37.6	9.3
Helsingør	27.8	4.7	7.5	4.0	7.7	8.4	0.2	10.9	2.5	1.1	10.7	4.7	5.3	4.3	0.1	50.8	38.2	10.9
Herlev	33.8	3.8	5.8	3.4	9.4	6.3	0.6	9.8	3.4	1.8	8.2	4.3	6.8	2.5	0.1	58.0	32.1	9.8
Hillerød	23.7	4.8	6.5	3.9	9.5	8.8	0.5	12.0	2.2	0.7	14.4	4.5	4.9	3.7	0.1	47.2	40.7	12.0
Hvidovre	32.3	4.3	4.6	3.1	11.4	6.1	0.3	9.7	4.7	2.4	8.1	4.6	5.5	2.8	0.1	58.6	31.5	9.7
Høje-Taastrup	29.4	4.2	8.7	3.9	8.4	6.7	0.5	9.3	4.3	3.5	9.1	5.6	4.5	2.0	0.1	51.9	38.7	9.3
Hørsholm	13.4	5.1	13.2	3.4	4.0	17.0	0.2	14.0	2.0	0.4	20.6	3.0	1.9	1.8	0.0	26.5	59.4	14.0
Ishøj	32.7	3.8	3.5	3.9	7.9	5.3	0.6	8.4	5.2	7.6	7.9	6.1	5.5	1.5	0.1	59.1	32.4	8.4
Copenhagen	17.7	7.8	4.3	1.5	12.0	8.3	0.2	9.2	1.4	2.5	7.8	1.5	15.2	10.4	0.2	65.6	25.0	9.2
Lyngby-Taarbæk	19.1	7.7	10.4	2.2	10.6	10.4	0.2	13.5	2.2	0.6	12.8	1.8	4.6	3.9	0.1	46.5	39.9	13.5
Rudersdal	14.2	8.3	12.5	2.3	6.5	13.9	0.2	12.6	1.5	0.3	18.4	2.0	3.7	3.5	0.1	36.5	50.8	12.6
Rødovre	33.1	4.2	4.5	3.0	10.4	6.4	0.5	9.7	4.4	2.5	8.0	4.1	6.0	3.1	0.1	59.3	30.9	9.7
Tårnby	36.5	2.6	4.3	4.0	8.2	6.5	0.2	8.6	4.4	1.3	9.7	5.7	4.9	2.8	0.1	56.4	34.9	8.6
Vallensbæk	27.0	4.0	10.8	3.0	7.4	7.7	0.4	12.0	3.8	3.5	10.3	5.1	3.6	1.4	0.1	46.9	41.1	12.0
