= Herning South (nomination district) =

- Herning Syd
- Nomination district constituency for the Folketing
- Location of Herning South within West Jutland

- Location of West Jutland within Denmark
- Municipalities: Herning
- Constituency: West Jutland
- Electorate: 30,871 (2022)

Current constituency
- Created: 2007

Herning South nominating district is one of the 92 nominating districts that was created for Danish elections following the 2007 municipal reform. It is one of the two nominating districts in Herning Municipality, the other being Herning North.

In general elections, the district is a very strong area for parties commonly associated with the blue bloc.

== General elections results ==
=== General elections in the 2020s ===
2022 Danish general election

| Parties | Vote | | |
| Parties | Votes | % | + / - |
|---|---|---|---|
| Social Democrats | 5,842 | 23.23 | +0.98 |
| Venstre | 5,014 | 19.94 | -11.71 |
| Denmark Democrats | 3,132 | 12.45 | New |
| Liberal Alliance | 2,674 | 10.63 | +7.03 |
| Moderates | 2,100 | 8.35 | New |
| Conservatives | 1,700 | 6.76 | -1.57 |
| Green Left | 1,353 | 5.38 | +0.06 |
| New Right | 754 | 3.00 | +1.16 |
| Red–Green Alliance | 577 | 2.29 | -0.85 |
| Danish People's Party | 548 | 2.18 | -5.53 |
| Social Liberals | 527 | 2.10 | -4.46 |
| Christian Democrats | 468 | 1.86 | -3.52 |
| The Alternative | 320 | 1.27 | -0.61 |
| Independent Greens | 112 | 0.45 | New |
| Karen Predbjørn Klarbæk | 29 | 0.12 | New |
| Total | 25,150 | | |

=== General elections in the 2010s ===
2019 Danish general election

| Parties | Vote | | |
| Parties | Votes | % | + / - |
|---|---|---|---|
| Venstre | 8,217 | 31.65 | +2.78 |
| Social Democrats | 5,776 | 22.25 | +0.60 |
| Conservatives | 2,163 | 8.33 | +4.78 |
| Danish People's Party | 2,002 | 7.71 | -14.69 |
| Social Liberals | 1,703 | 6.56 | +3.60 |
| Christian Democrats | 1,396 | 5.38 | +2.53 |
| Green Left | 1,381 | 5.32 | +1.96 |
| Liberal Alliance | 934 | 3.60 | -4.06 |
| Red–Green Alliance | 814 | 3.14 | -1.27 |
| The Alternative | 488 | 1.88 | -0.38 |
| New Right | 478 | 1.84 | New |
| Stram Kurs | 443 | 1.71 | New |
| Klaus Riskær Pedersen Party | 168 | 0.65 | New |
| Total | 25,963 | | |

2015 Danish general election

| Parties | Vote | | |
| Parties | Votes | % | + / - |
|---|---|---|---|
| Venstre | 7,553 | 28.87 | -8.16 |
| Danish People's Party | 5,859 | 22.40 | +10.31 |
| Social Democrats | 5,663 | 21.65 | -0.25 |
| Liberal Alliance | 2,004 | 7.66 | +2.71 |
| Red–Green Alliance | 1,153 | 4.41 | +1.30 |
| Conservatives | 929 | 3.55 | -1.10 |
| Green Left | 879 | 3.36 | -3.66 |
| Social Liberals | 775 | 2.96 | -4.34 |
| Christian Democrats | 746 | 2.85 | +0.94 |
| The Alternative | 590 | 2.26 | New |
| Erik Sputnik | 8 | 0.03 | New |
| Total | 26,159 | | |

2011 Danish general election

| Parties | Vote | | |
| Parties | Votes | % | + / - |
|---|---|---|---|
| Venstre | 9,707 | 37.03 | -2.03 |
| Social Democrats | 5,740 | 21.90 | +0.71 |
| Danish People's Party | 3,170 | 12.09 | -1.73 |
| Social Liberals | 1,913 | 7.30 | +2.80 |
| Green Left | 1,841 | 7.02 | -1.22 |
| Liberal Alliance | 1,297 | 4.95 | +3.24 |
| Conservatives | 1,220 | 4.65 | -2.60 |
| Red–Green Alliance | 814 | 3.11 | +2.41 |
| Christian Democrats | 501 | 1.91 | -1.60 |
| Rikke Cramer Christiansen | 8 | 0.03 | New |
| Ejgil Kølbæk | 1 | 0.00 | -0.02 |
| Total | 26,212 | | |

=== General elections in the 2000s ===
2007 Danish general election

| Parties | Vote | | |
| Parties | Votes | % | + / - |
|---|---|---|---|
| Venstre | 10,104 | 39.06 | |
| Social Democrats | 5,482 | 21.19 | |
| Danish People's Party | 3,574 | 13.82 | |
| Green Left | 2,132 | 8.24 | |
| Conservatives | 1,876 | 7.25 | |
| Social Liberals | 1,165 | 4.50 | |
| Christian Democrats | 907 | 3.51 | |
| New Alliance | 442 | 1.71 | |
| Red–Green Alliance | 182 | 0.70 | |
| Ejgil Kølbæk | 5 | 0.02 | |
| Total | 25,869 | | |

== European Parliament elections results ==
2024 European Parliament election in Denmark

| Parties | Vote | | |
| Parties | Votes | % | + / - |
|---|---|---|---|
| Venstre | 3,678 | 22.28 | -16.67 |
| Social Democrats | 2,185 | 13.23 | -4.65 |
| Denmark Democrats | 1,975 | 11.96 | New |
| Green Left | 1,771 | 10.73 | +1.88 |
| Conservatives | 1,665 | 10.08 | +4.02 |
| Liberal Alliance | 1,530 | 9.27 | +6.69 |
| Danish People's Party | 1,118 | 6.77 | -3.34 |
| Moderates | 1,025 | 6.21 | New |
| Social Liberals | 813 | 4.92 | -2.39 |
| Red–Green Alliance | 476 | 2.88 | -0.18 |
| The Alternative | 274 | 1.66 | -0.66 |
| Total | 16,510 | | |

2019 European Parliament election in Denmark

| Parties | Vote | | |
| Parties | Votes | % | + / - |
|---|---|---|---|
| Venstre | 7,555 | 38.95 | +13.61 |
| Social Democrats | 3,468 | 17.88 | +2.37 |
| Danish People's Party | 1,961 | 10.11 | -19.45 |
| Green Left | 1,716 | 8.85 | +2.07 |
| Social Liberals | 1,418 | 7.31 | +2.49 |
| Conservatives | 1,176 | 6.06 | -4.46 |
| Red–Green Alliance | 593 | 3.06 | New |
| People's Movement against the EU | 560 | 2.89 | -2.22 |
| Liberal Alliance | 501 | 2.58 | +0.22 |
| The Alternative | 451 | 2.32 | New |
| Total | 19,399 | | |

2014 European Parliament election in Denmark

| Parties | Vote | | |
| Parties | Votes | % | + / - |
|---|---|---|---|
| Danish People's Party | 4,676 | 29.56 | +14.24 |
| Venstre | 4,008 | 25.34 | -2.92 |
| Social Democrats | 2,453 | 15.51 | -4.17 |
| Conservatives | 1,664 | 10.52 | -6.15 |
| Green Left | 1,072 | 6.78 | -3.49 |
| People's Movement against the EU | 809 | 5.11 | +0.46 |
| Social Liberals | 762 | 4.82 | +1.71 |
| Liberal Alliance | 373 | 2.36 | +1.79 |
| Total | 15,817 | | |

2009 European Parliament election in Denmark

| Parties | Vote | | |
| Parties | Votes | % | + / - |
|---|---|---|---|
| Venstre | 4,697 | 28.26 | |
| Social Democrats | 3,270 | 19.68 | |
| Conservatives | 2,771 | 16.67 | |
| Danish People's Party | 2,547 | 15.32 | |
| Green Left | 1,707 | 10.27 | |
| People's Movement against the EU | 773 | 4.65 | |
| Social Liberals | 517 | 3.11 | |
| June Movement | 244 | 1.47 | |
| Liberal Alliance | 94 | 0.57 | |
| Total | 16,620 | | |

== Referendums ==
2022 Danish European Union opt-out referendum

| Option | Votes | % |
|---|---|---|
| ✓ YES | 12,471 | 65.72 |
| X NO | 6,504 | 34.28 |

2015 Danish European Union opt-out referendum

| Option | Votes | % |
|---|---|---|
| X NO | 11,086 | 52.81 |
| ✓ YES | 9,905 | 47.19 |

2014 Danish Unified Patent Court membership referendum

| Option | Votes | % |
|---|---|---|
| ✓ YES | 9,719 | 63.07 |
| X NO | 5,692 | 36.93 |

2009 Danish Act of Succession referendum

| Option | Votes | % |
|---|---|---|
| ✓ YES | 13,686 | 85.32 |
| X NO | 2,354 | 14.68 |
