= Lolland (nomination district) =

- Lolland
- Nomination district constituency for the Folketing
- Location of Lolland within Zealand

- Location of Zealand within Denmark
- Municipalities: Lolland
- Constituency: Zealand
- Electorate: 31,368 (2022)

Current constituency
- Created: 2007

Lolland nominating district is one of the 92 nominating districts that was created for Danish elections following the 2007 municipal reform. It consists of Lolland Municipality.

In general elections, the district is a strong area for parties commonly associated with the red bloc.

== General elections results ==
=== General elections in the 2020s ===
2022 Danish general election

Parties	Vote		
Parties	Votes	%	+ / -
Social Democrats	10,437	43.63	+3.68
Denmark Democrats	2,494	10.43	New
Venstre	2,411	10.08	-10.43
Moderates	1,773	7.41	New
Green Left	1,510	6.31	-0.63
Danish People's Party	1,392	5.82	-6.42
New Right	1,054	4.41	+2.06
Liberal Alliance	878	3.67	+2.71
Conservatives	708	2.96	-0.68
Red–Green Alliance	656	2.74	-2.19
The Alternative	262	1.10	+0.01
Social Liberals	190	0.79	-1.73
Christian Democrats	57	0.24	-0.44
Independent Greens	46	0.19	New
Rasmus Paludan	27	0.11	New
Lisa Sofia Larsson	24	0.10	New
Total	23,919		

=== General elections in the 2010s ===
2019 Danish general election

Parties	Vote		
Parties	Votes	%	+ / -
Social Democrats	10,000	39.95	+4.32
Venstre	5,134	20.51	+3.97
Danish People's Party	3,065	12.24	-13.61
Green Left	1,736	6.94	+2.85
Red–Green Alliance	1,234	4.93	-2.50
Conservatives	912	3.64	+0.20
Stram Kurs	830	3.32	New
Social Liberals	632	2.52	+1.18
New Right	588	2.35	New
The Alternative	273	1.09	-1.29
Liberal Alliance	241	0.96	-1.99
Klaus Riskær Pedersen Party	213	0.85	New
Christian Democrats	171	0.68	+0.39
Pinki Karin Yvonne Jensen	3	0.01	New
Total	25,032		

2015 Danish general election

Parties	Vote		
Parties	Votes	%	+ / -
Social Democrats	9,679	35.63	+4.48
Danish People's Party	7,024	25.85	+10.60
Venstre	4,494	16.54	-2.94
Red–Green Alliance	2,019	7.43	+2.12
Green Left	1,111	4.09	-14.17
Conservatives	935	3.44	+0.21
Liberal Alliance	802	2.95	+0.22
The Alternative	646	2.38	New
Social Liberals	365	1.34	-2.87
Christian Democrats	80	0.29	-0.02
Aamer Ahmad	9	0.03	New
Michael Christiansen	2	0.01	New
Bent A. Jespersen	2	0.01	0.00
Total	27,168		

2011 Danish general election

Parties	Vote		
Parties	Votes	%	+ / -
Social Democrats	9,279	31.15	+5.61
Venstre	5,802	19.48	-3.08
Green Left	5,440	18.26	-7.58
Danish People's Party	4,544	15.25	-1.59
Red–Green Alliance	1,583	5.31	+4.15
Social Liberals	1,255	4.21	+2.52
Conservatives	961	3.23	-1.60
Liberal Alliance	814	2.73	+1.44
Christian Democrats	92	0.31	+0.07
Johan Isbrandt Haulik	12	0.04	New
Bent A. Jespersen	3	0.01	New
Peter Lotinga	3	0.01	New
Total	29,788		

=== General elections in the 2000s ===
2007 Danish general election

Parties	Vote		
Parties	Votes	%	+ / -
Green Left	8,032	25.84	
Social Democrats	7,940	25.54	
Venstre	7,014	22.56	
Danish People's Party	5,234	16.84	
Conservatives	1,503	4.83	
Social Liberals	524	1.69	
New Alliance	402	1.29	
Red–Green Alliance	362	1.16	
Christian Democrats	76	0.24	
Total	31,087		

== European Parliament elections results ==
2024 European Parliament election in Denmark

Parties	Vote		
Parties	Votes	%	+ / -
Social Democrats	3,544	25.43	-7.53
Green Left	1,944	13.95	+4.06
Danish People's Party	1,740	12.48	-3.96
Venstre	1,713	12.29	-7.92
Denmark Democrats	1,402	10.06	New
Conservatives	1,268	9.10	+5.60
Moderates	682	4.89	New
Red–Green Alliance	574	4.12	-0.18
Liberal Alliance	525	3.77	+2.68
Social Liberals	363	2.60	-1.88
The Alternative	184	1.32	-0.18
Total	13,939		

2019 European Parliament election in Denmark

Parties	Vote		
Parties	Votes	%	+ / -
Social Democrats	5,831	32.96	+10.83
Venstre	3,576	20.21	+4.13
Danish People's Party	2,908	16.44	-19.02
Green Left	1,749	9.89	+1.55
People's Movement against the EU	999	5.65	-2.78
Social Liberals	792	4.48	+2.27
Red–Green Alliance	761	4.30	New
Conservatives	619	3.50	-2.63
The Alternative	265	1.50	New
Liberal Alliance	193	1.09	-0.13
Total	17,693		

2014 European Parliament election in Denmark

Parties	Vote		
Parties	Votes	%	+ / -
Danish People's Party	5,853	35.46	+17.10
Social Democrats	3,652	22.13	-3.18
Venstre	2,654	16.08	-0.97
People's Movement against the EU	1,392	8.43	+1.57
Green Left	1,377	8.34	-9.73
Conservatives	1,011	6.13	-3.58
Social Liberals	365	2.21	+0.03
Liberal Alliance	202	1.22	+0.90
Total	16,506		

2009 European Parliament election in Denmark

Parties	Vote		
Parties	Votes	%	+ / -
Social Democrats	4,707	25.31	
Danish People's Party	3,414	18.36	
Green Left	3,360	18.07	
Venstre	3,171	17.05	
Conservatives	1,806	9.71	
People's Movement against the EU	1,276	6.86	
Social Liberals	406	2.18	
June Movement	398	2.14	
Liberal Alliance	59	0.32	
Total	18,597		

== Referendums ==
2022 Danish European Union opt-out referendum

Option	Votes	%
✓ YES	11,245	59.17
X NO	7,758	40.83

2015 Danish European Union opt-out referendum

Option	Votes	%
X NO	14,577	63.75
✓ YES	8,289	36.25

2014 Danish Unified Patent Court membership referendum

Option	Votes	%
✓ YES	9,399	57.77
X NO	6,871	42.23

2009 Danish Act of Succession referendum

Option	Votes	%
✓ YES	14,815	82.34
X NO	3,177	17.66
