= Silkeborg South (nomination district) =

- Silkeborg South
- Nomination district constituency for the Folketing
- Location of Silkeborg South within West Jutland

- Location of West Jutland within Denmark
- Municipalities: Silkeborg
- Constituency: West Jutland
- Electorate: 37,895 (2022)

Current constituency
- Created: 2007

Silkeborg South nominating district is one of the 92 nominating districts that was created for Danish elections following the 2007 municipal reform It is one of the two nominating districts in Silkeborg Municipality, the other being Silkeborg North.

In general elections, the district has often voted close to the national results when looking at the voting distribution between the two blocs.

== General elections results ==
=== General elections in the 2020s ===
2022 Danish general election

Parties	Vote		
Parties	Votes	%	+ / -
Social Democrats	8,572	26.59	+0.71
Venstre	5,207	16.15	-8.17
Moderates	3,235	10.03	New
Liberal Alliance	2,890	8.96	+6.29
Green Left	2,825	8.76	+0.64
Conservatives	2,366	7.34	-1.86
Denmark Democrats	2,093	6.49	New
Red–Green Alliance	1,453	4.51	-1.51
Social Liberals	1,128	3.50	-4.39
The Alternative	791	2.45	-0.62
New Right	759	2.35	+0.74
Danish People's Party	577	1.79	-5.12
Christian Democrats	178	0.55	-1.54
Independent Greens	104	0.32	New
Karen Predbjørn Klarbæk	60	0.19	New
Total	32,238		

=== General elections in the 2010s ===
2019 Danish general election

Parties	Vote		
Parties	Votes	%	+ / -
Social Democrats	7,882	25.88	-1.04
Venstre	7,407	24.32	+3.55
Conservatives	2,803	9.20	+4.89
Green Left	2,472	8.12	+3.47
Social Liberals	2,403	7.89	+3.62
Danish People's Party	2,104	6.91	-10.95
Red–Green Alliance	1,833	6.02	-0.77
The Alternative	935	3.07	-2.12
Liberal Alliance	812	2.67	-5.68
Christian Democrats	636	2.09	+1.20
New Right	490	1.61	New
Stram Kurs	451	1.48	New
Klaus Riskær Pedersen Party	225	0.74	New
Total	30,453		

2015 Danish general election

Parties	Vote		
Parties	Votes	%	+ / -
Social Democrats	8,006	26.92	+1.51
Venstre	6,176	20.77	-7.47
Danish People's Party	5,311	17.86	+7.76
Liberal Alliance	2,483	8.35	+2.55
Red–Green Alliance	2,018	6.79	+0.97
The Alternative	1,544	5.19	New
Green Left	1,384	4.65	-4.75
Conservatives	1,282	4.31	-0.43
Social Liberals	1,269	4.27	-5.48
Christian Democrats	264	0.89	+0.16
Erik Sputnik	4	0.01	New
Total	29,741		

2011 Danish general election

Parties	Vote		
Parties	Votes	%	+ / -
Venstre	8,421	28.24	+2.77
Social Democrats	7,577	25.41	-2.18
Danish People's Party	3,011	10.10	-1.04
Social Liberals	2,906	9.75	+5.27
Green Left	2,802	9.40	-2.95
Red–Green Alliance	1,734	5.82	+3.99
Liberal Alliance	1,729	5.80	+1.97
Conservatives	1,413	4.74	-7.61
Christian Democrats	218	0.73	-0.22
Rikke Cramer Christiansen	3	0.01	New
Ejgil Kølbæk	1	0.00	-0.01
Total	29,815		

=== General elections in the 2000s ===
2007 Danish general election

Parties	Vote		
Parties	Votes	%	+ / -
Social Democrats	8,011	27.59	
Venstre	7,395	25.47	
Conservatives	3,586	12.35	
Green Left	3,586	12.35	
Danish People's Party	3,234	11.14	
Social Liberals	1,301	4.48	
New Alliance	1,111	3.83	
Red–Green Alliance	530	1.83	
Christian Democrats	276	0.95	
Ejgil Kølbæk	3	0.01	
Total	29,033		

== European Parliament elections results ==
2024 European Parliament election in Denmark

Parties	Vote		
Parties	Votes	%	+ / -
Green Left	4,091	17.17	+4.41
Venstre	3,822	16.04	-9.24
Social Democrats	3,648	15.31	-6.13
Conservatives	2,312	9.70	+3.26
Liberal Alliance	1,824	7.65	+5.26
Social Liberals	1,818	7.63	-3.91
Moderates	1,727	7.25	New
Denmark Democrats	1,521	6.38	New
Red–Green Alliance	1,244	5.22	+0.68
Danish People's Party	1,227	5.15	-3.79
The Alternative	599	2.51	-1.02
Total	23,833		

2019 European Parliament election in Denmark

Parties	Vote		
Parties	Votes	%	+ / -
Venstre	6,193	25.28	+7.61
Social Democrats	5,251	21.44	+2.47
Green Left	3,125	12.76	+1.84
Social Liberals	2,826	11.54	+4.66
Danish People's Party	2,189	8.94	-14.91
Conservatives	1,578	6.44	-4.42
Red–Green Alliance	1,112	4.54	New
The Alternative	864	3.53	New
People's Movement against the EU	771	3.15	-4.51
Liberal Alliance	585	2.39	-0.80
Total	24,494		

2014 European Parliament election in Denmark

Parties	Vote		
Parties	Votes	%	+ / -
Danish People's Party	4,729	23.85	+9.47
Social Democrats	3,762	18.97	-3.27
Venstre	3,504	17.67	-3.36
Green Left	2,165	10.92	-5.92
Conservatives	2,154	10.86	-1.45
People's Movement against the EU	1,518	7.66	+0.94
Social Liberals	1,364	6.88	+2.99
Liberal Alliance	632	3.19	+2.49
Total	19,828		

2009 European Parliament election in Denmark

Parties	Vote		
Parties	Votes	%	+ / -
Social Democrats	4,512	22.24	
Venstre	4,268	21.03	
Green Left	3,417	16.84	
Danish People's Party	2,917	14.38	
Conservatives	2,497	12.31	
People's Movement against the EU	1,363	6.72	
Social Liberals	789	3.89	
June Movement	387	1.91	
Liberal Alliance	142	0.70	
Total	20,292		

== Referendums ==
2022 Danish European Union opt-out referendum

Option	Votes	%
✓ YES	18,202	71.45
X NO	7,273	28.55

2015 Danish European Union opt-out referendum

Option	Votes	%
✓ YES	12,658	51.31
X NO	12,013	48.69

2014 Danish Unified Patent Court membership referendum

Option	Votes	%
✓ YES	12,879	66.99
X NO	6,345	33.01

2009 Danish Act of Succession referendum

Option	Votes	%
✓ YES	16,545	87.15
X NO	2,439	12.85
