= Ikast (nomination district) =

- Ikast
- Nomination district constituency for the Folketing
- Location of Ikast within West Jutland

- Location of West Jutland within Denmark
- Municipalities: Ikast-Brande
- Constituency: West Jutland
- Electorate: 29,364 (2022)

Current constituency
- Created: 2007

Ikast nominating district is one of the 92 nominating districts that was created for Danish elections following the 2007 municipal reform. It consists of Ikast-Brande municipality.

In general elections, the district is a very strong area for parties commonly associated with the blue bloc, and in the 2022 election, it became the district where they received their 3rd highest vote share.

== General elections results ==
=== General elections in the 2020s ===
2022 Danish general election

Parties	Vote		
Parties	Votes	%	+ / -
Social Democrats	5,747	23.65	+1.44
Venstre	4,795	19.73	-15.30
Denmark Democrats	4,065	16.73	New
Liberal Alliance	1,934	7.96	+5.74
Moderates	1,806	7.43	New
Conservatives	1,744	7.18	+0.29
Green Left	1,069	4.40	-0.10
New Right	957	3.94	+1.89
Danish People's Party	649	2.67	-9.67
Red–Green Alliance	416	1.71	-1.01
Social Liberals	371	1.53	-2.34
Christian Democrats	363	1.49	-2.79
The Alternative	303	1.25	-0.13
Independent Greens	63	0.26	New
Karen Predbjørn Klarbæk	22	0.09	New
Total	24,304		

=== General elections in the 2010s ===
2019 Danish general election

Parties	Vote		
Parties	Votes	%	+ / -
Venstre	8,560	35.03	+5.28
Social Democrats	5,428	22.21	+0.60
Danish People's Party	3,015	12.34	-15.14
Conservatives	1,683	6.89	+3.48
Green Left	1,099	4.50	+2.10
Christian Democrats	1,045	4.28	+2.21
Social Liberals	945	3.87	+1.81
Red–Green Alliance	665	2.72	-1.00
Liberal Alliance	543	2.22	-3.22
New Right	502	2.05	New
Stram Kurs	450	1.84	New
The Alternative	336	1.38	-0.64
Klaus Riskær Pedersen Party	165	0.68	New
Total	24,436		

2015 Danish general election

Parties	Vote		
Parties	Votes	%	+ / -
Venstre	7,438	29.75	-6.67
Danish People's Party	6,871	27.48	+11.38
Social Democrats	5,403	21.61	+0.01
Liberal Alliance	1,359	5.44	+0.80
Red–Green Alliance	930	3.72	+1.00
Conservatives	852	3.41	-1.33
Green Left	600	2.40	-3.57
Christian Democrats	518	2.07	+0.34
Social Liberals	515	2.06	-3.97
The Alternative	505	2.02	New
Erik Sputnik	11	0.04	New
Total	25,002		

2011 Danish general election

Parties	Vote		
Parties	Votes	%	+ / -
Venstre	9,213	36.42	-1.76
Social Democrats	5,463	21.60	+1.65
Danish People's Party	4,072	16.10	-1.22
Social Liberals	1,525	6.03	+2.98
Green Left	1,510	5.97	-1.05
Conservatives	1,199	4.74	-3.66
Liberal Alliance	1,175	4.64	+2.94
Red–Green Alliance	687	2.72	+2.15
Christian Democrats	437	1.73	-2.04
Rikke Cramer Christiansen	13	0.05	New
Ejgil Kølbæk	3	0.01	-0.03
Total	25,297		

=== General elections in the 2000s ===
2007 Danish general election

Parties	Vote		
Parties	Votes	%	+ / -
Venstre	9,459	38.18	
Social Democrats	4,943	19.95	
Danish People's Party	4,292	17.32	
Conservatives	2,082	8.40	
Green Left	1,739	7.02	
Christian Democrats	934	3.77	
Social Liberals	756	3.05	
New Alliance	420	1.70	
Red–Green Alliance	142	0.57	
Ejgil Kølbæk	9	0.04	
Total	24,776		

== European Parliament elections results ==
2024 European Parliament election in Denmark

Parties	Vote		
Parties	Votes	%	+ / -
Venstre	4,021	25.21	-12.13
Denmark Democrats	2,440	15.30	New
Social Democrats	2,208	13.85	-5.23
Danish People's Party	1,421	8.91	-5.82
Green Left	1,410	8.84	+1.61
Conservatives	1,342	8.42	+2.34
Liberal Alliance	1,284	8.05	+5.79
Moderates	663	4.16	New
Social Liberals	591	3.71	-2.32
Red–Green Alliance	337	2.11	-0.43
The Alternative	230	1.44	-0.11
Total	15,947		

2019 European Parliament election in Denmark

Parties	Vote		
Parties	Votes	%	+ / -
Venstre	6,828	37.34	+13.23
Social Democrats	3,489	19.08	+4.33
Danish People's Party	2,693	14.73	-18.82
Green Left	1,323	7.23	+1.81
Conservatives	1,111	6.08	-6.17
Social Liberals	1,102	6.03	+2.50
People's Movement against the EU	582	3.18	-1.17
Red–Green Alliance	464	2.54	New
Liberal Alliance	413	2.26	+0.24
The Alternative	283	1.55	New
Total	18,288		

2014 European Parliament election in Denmark

Parties	Vote		
Parties	Votes	%	+ / -
Danish People's Party	5,186	33.55	+15.53
Venstre	3,727	24.11	-2.90
Social Democrats	2,280	14.75	-2.80
Conservatives	1,894	12.25	-8.53
Green Left	838	5.42	-3.17
People's Movement against the EU	673	4.35	+0.21
Social Liberals	546	3.53	+1.28
Liberal Alliance	313	2.02	+1.58
Total	15,457		

2009 European Parliament election in Denmark

Parties	Vote		
Parties	Votes	%	+ / -
Venstre	4,445	27.01	
Conservatives	3,420	20.78	
Danish People's Party	2,966	18.02	
Social Democrats	2,888	17.55	
Green Left	1,413	8.59	
People's Movement against the EU	681	4.14	
Social Liberals	371	2.25	
June Movement	199	1.21	
Liberal Alliance	72	0.44	
Total	16,455		

== Referendums ==
2022 Danish European Union opt-out referendum

Option	Votes	%
✓ YES	11,781	63.18
X NO	6,866	36.82

2015 Danish European Union opt-out referendum

Option	Votes	%
X NO	11,196	54.70
✓ YES	9,271	45.30

2014 Danish Unified Patent Court membership referendum

Option	Votes	%
✓ YES	9,600	63.93
X NO	5,416	36.07

2009 Danish Act of Succession referendum

Option	Votes	%
✓ YES	13,775	86.36
X NO	2,175	13.64
