= Herning North (nomination district) =

- Herning Nord
- Nomination district constituency for the Folketing
- Location of Herning North within West Jutland

- Location of West Jutland within Denmark
- Municipalities: Herning
- Constituency: West Jutland
- Electorate: 33,824 (2022)

Current constituency
- Created: 2007

Herning North nominating district is one of the 92 nominating districts that was created for Danish elections following the 2007 municipal reform. It is one of the two nominating districts in Herning Municipality, the other being Herning South.

In general elections, the district is a very strong area for parties commonly associated with the blue bloc, and in the 2022 election, it became the district where they received their 2nd highest vote share, and it is also one of the 3 nomination districts, where Venstre has always won the most votes.

== General elections results ==
=== General elections in the 2020s ===
2022 Danish general election

Parties	Vote		
Parties	Votes	%	+ / -
Venstre	6,709	23.03	-11.75
Social Democrats	6,384	21.91	+1.36
Denmark Democrats	4,485	15.39	New
Liberal Alliance	2,498	8.57	+6.14
Moderates	2,132	7.32	New
Conservatives	1,890	6.49	-2.01
Green Left	1,506	5.17	+0.42
New Right	854	2.93	+1.11
Christian Democrats	818	2.81	-5.53
Danish People's Party	550	1.89	-6.44
Social Liberals	452	1.55	-3.38
Red–Green Alliance	435	1.49	-0.96
The Alternative	290	1.00	-0.17
Independent Greens	103	0.35	New
Karen Predbjørn Klarbæk	30	0.10	New
Total	29,136		

=== General elections in the 2010s ===
2019 Danish general election

Parties	Vote		
Parties	Votes	%	+ / -
Venstre	10,049	34.78	+2.40
Social Democrats	5,937	20.55	+0.72
Conservatives	2,456	8.50	+5.01
Christian Democrats	2,409	8.34	+4.00
Danish People's Party	2,407	8.33	-14.47
Social Liberals	1,424	4.93	+2.18
Green Left	1,372	4.75	+1.96
Red–Green Alliance	707	2.45	-0.89
Liberal Alliance	703	2.43	-4.02
New Right	525	1.82	New
Stram Kurs	402	1.39	New
The Alternative	339	1.17	-0.62
Klaus Riskær Pedersen Party	167	0.58	New
Total	28,897		

2015 Danish general election

Parties	Vote		
Parties	Votes	%	+ / -
Venstre	9,256	32.38	-9.42
Danish People's Party	6,518	22.80	+10.55
Social Democrats	5,670	19.83	+1.83
Liberal Alliance	1,844	6.45	+1.49
Christian Democrats	1,242	4.34	+0.82
Conservatives	998	3.49	-0.80
Red–Green Alliance	956	3.34	+0.91
Green Left	797	2.79	-2.97
Social Liberals	786	2.75	-4.20
The Alternative	513	1.79	New
Erik Sputnik	9	0.03	New
Total	28,589		

2011 Danish general election

Parties	Vote		
Parties	Votes	%	+ / -
Venstre	11,951	41.80	-3.42
Social Democrats	5,146	18.00	+0.34
Danish People's Party	3,502	12.25	-0.70
Social Liberals	1,988	6.95	+3.19
Green Left	1,647	5.76	-0.46
Liberal Alliance	1,418	4.96	+3.23
Conservatives	1,226	4.29	-2.81
Christian Democrats	1,006	3.52	-1.21
Red–Green Alliance	696	2.43	+1.87
Rikke Cramer Christiansen	7	0.02	New
Ejgil Kølbæk	7	0.02	-0.04
Total	28,594		

=== General elections in the 2000s ===
2007 Danish general election

Parties	Vote		
Parties	Votes	%	+ / -
Venstre	12,527	45.22	
Social Democrats	4,892	17.66	
Danish People's Party	3,589	12.95	
Conservatives	1,967	7.10	
Green Left	1,723	6.22	
Christian Democrats	1,310	4.73	
Social Liberals	1,043	3.76	
New Alliance	480	1.73	
Red–Green Alliance	156	0.56	
Ejgil Kølbæk	17	0.06	
Total	27,704		

== European Parliament elections results ==
2024 European Parliament election in Denmark

Parties	Vote		
Parties	Votes	%	+ / -
Venstre	5,035	25.13	-20.33
Denmark Democrats	3,012	15.03	New
Social Democrats	2,508	12.52	-4.16
Conservatives	2,119	10.57	+4.63
Green Left	1,906	9.51	+2.3
Liberal Alliance	1,665	8.31	+6.09
Danish People's Party	1,257	6.27	-3.67
Moderates	1,101	5.49	New
Social Liberals	816	4.07	-2.32
Red–Green Alliance	375	1.87	-0.38
The Alternative	244	1.22	-0.24
Total	20,038		

2019 European Parliament election in Denmark

Parties	Vote		
Parties	Votes	%	+ / -
Venstre	10,291	45.46	+17.06
Social Democrats	3,776	16.68	+3.19
Danish People's Party	2,251	9.94	-19.63
Green Left	1,633	7.21	+1.63
Social Liberals	1,447	6.39	+2.01
Conservatives	1,344	5.94	-6.09
People's Movement against the EU	555	2.45	-1.66
Red–Green Alliance	510	2.25	New
Liberal Alliance	502	2.22	-0.22
The Alternative	330	1.46	New
Total	22,639		

2014 European Parliament election in Denmark

Parties	Vote		
Parties	Votes	%	+ / -
Danish People's Party	5,442	29.57	+14.91
Venstre	5,226	28.40	-3.81
Social Democrats	2,483	13.49	-2.21
Conservatives	2,214	12.03	-7.57
Green Left	1,027	5.58	-3.45
Social Liberals	806	4.38	+1.45
People's Movement against the EU	756	4.11	+0.12
Liberal Alliance	449	2.44	+1.98
Total	18,403		

2009 European Parliament election in Denmark

Parties	Vote		
Parties	Votes	%	+ / -
Venstre	6,104	32.21	
Conservatives	3,715	19.60	
Social Democrats	2,975	15.70	
Danish People's Party	2,779	14.66	
Green Left	1,711	9.03	
People's Movement against the EU	756	3.99	
Social Liberals	555	2.93	
June Movement	268	1.41	
Liberal Alliance	88	0.46	
Total	18,951		

== Referendums ==
2022 Danish European Union opt-out referendum

Option	Votes	%
✓ YES	15,293	66.69
X NO	7,638	33.31

2015 Danish European Union opt-out referendum

Option	Votes	%
✓ YES	11,997	50.16
X NO	11,920	49.84

2014 Danish Unified Patent Court membership referendum

Option	Votes	%
✓ YES	11,663	65.58
X NO	6,122	34.42

2009 Danish Act of Succession referendum

Option	Votes	%
✓ YES	15,951	86.49
X NO	2,491	13.51
