= Silkeborg North (nomination district) =

- Silkeborg Nord
- Nomination district constituency for the Folketing
- Location of Silkeborg North within West Jutland

- Location of West Jutland within Denmark
- Municipalities: Silkeborg
- Constituency: West Jutland
- Electorate: 34,230 (2022)

Current constituency
- Created: 2007

Silkeborg North nominating district is one of the 92 nominating districts that was created for Danish elections following the 2007 municipal reform It is one of the two nominating districts in Silkeborg Municipality, the other being Silkeborg South.

In general elections, parties commonly associated with the blue bloc has always won the most votes.

== General elections results ==
=== General elections in the 2020s ===
2022 Danish general election

Parties	Vote		
Parties	Votes	%	+ / -
Social Democrats	7,375	24.92	+0.98
Venstre	5,268	17.80	-10.18
Denmark Democrats	3,119	10.54	New
Moderates	2,588	8.74	New
Liberal Alliance	2,443	8.25	+6.04
Green Left	2,236	7.56	+0.66
Conservatives	2,169	7.33	-1.52
New Right	1,056	3.57	+1.59
Red–Green Alliance	915	3.09	-1.41
Social Liberals	737	2.49	-3.53
The Alternative	648	2.19	-0.32
Danish People's Party	560	1.89	-6.59
Christian Democrats	374	1.26	-2.99
Karen Predbjørn Klarbæk	60	0.20	New
Independent Greens	47	0.16	New
Total	29,595		

=== General elections in the 2010s ===
2019 Danish general election

Parties	Vote		
Parties	Votes	%	+ / -
Venstre	7,927	27.98	+2.89
Social Democrats	6,783	23.94	-0.23
Conservatives	2,506	8.85	+4.23
Danish People's Party	2,403	8.48	-12.79
Green Left	1,956	6.90	+3.11
Social Liberals	1,705	6.02	+2.82
Red–Green Alliance	1,275	4.50	-0.66
Christian Democrats	1,205	4.25	+2.31
The Alternative	710	2.51	-1.43
Liberal Alliance	627	2.21	-4.59
New Right	562	1.98	New
Stram Kurs	449	1.58	New
Klaus Riskær Pedersen Party	224	0.79	New
Total	28,332		

2015 Danish general election

Parties	Vote		
Parties	Votes	%	+ / -
Venstre	6,909	25.09	-7.64
Social Democrats	6,656	24.17	+0.73
Danish People's Party	5,855	21.27	+9.27
Liberal Alliance	1,872	6.80	+1.33
Red–Green Alliance	1,421	5.16	+0.88
Conservatives	1,272	4.62	+0.41
The Alternative	1,085	3.94	New
Green Left	1,044	3.79	-4.28
Social Liberals	881	3.20	-4.87
Christian Democrats	533	1.94	+0.28
Erik Sputnik	5	0.02	New
Total	27,533		

2011 Danish general election

Parties	Vote		
Parties	Votes	%	+ / -
Venstre	9,074	32.73	-0.55
Social Democrats	6,499	23.44	-0.38
Danish People's Party	3,328	12.00	-1.46
Social Liberals	2,238	8.07	+4.15
Green Left	2,238	8.07	-1.32
Liberal Alliance	1,517	5.47	+2.17
Red–Green Alliance	1,187	4.28	+3.29
Conservatives	1,168	4.21	-5.41
Christian Democrats	459	1.66	-0.55
Rikke Cramer Christiansen	15	0.05	New
Ejgil Kølbæk	1	0.00	-0.01
Total	27,724		

=== General elections in the 2000s ===
2007 Danish general election

Parties	Vote		
Parties	Votes	%	+ / -
Venstre	8,947	33.28	
Social Democrats	6,402	23.82	
Danish People's Party	3,618	13.46	
Conservatives	2,585	9.62	
Green Left	2,523	9.39	
Social Liberals	1,055	3.92	
New Alliance	887	3.30	
Christian Democrats	594	2.21	
Red–Green Alliance	267	0.99	
Ejgil Kølbæk	2	0.01	
Total	26,880		

== European Parliament elections results ==
2024 European Parliament election in Denmark

Parties	Vote		
Parties	Votes	%	+ / -
Venstre	3,777	17.78	-11.86
Green Left	3,152	14.84	+4.03
Social Democrats	2,902	13.66	-7.36
Denmark Democrats	2,471	11.63	New
Conservatives	2,135	10.05	+3.78
Liberal Alliance	1,699	8.00	+5.90
Danish People's Party	1,380	6.50	-4.93
Moderates	1,335	6.29	New
Social Liberals	1,195	5.63	-3.25
Red–Green Alliance	757	3.56	-0.21
The Alternative	435	2.05	-0.70
Total	21,238		

2019 European Parliament election in Denmark

Parties	Vote		
Parties	Votes	%	+ / -
Venstre	6,661	29.64	+9.31
Social Democrats	4,724	21.02	+3.97
Danish People's Party	2,568	11.43	-16.43
Green Left	2,428	10.81	+1.50
Social Liberals	1,995	8.88	+3.68
Conservatives	1,408	6.27	-4.83
Red–Green Alliance	848	3.77	New
People's Movement against the EU	749	3.33	-3.02
The Alternative	617	2.75	New
Liberal Alliance	473	2.10	-0.70
Total	22,471		

2014 European Parliament election in Denmark

Parties	Vote		
Parties	Votes	%	+ / -
Danish People's Party	5,127	27.86	+12.01
Venstre	3,741	20.33	-6.13
Social Democrats	3,137	17.05	-2.62
Conservatives	2,042	11.10	-2.20
Green Left	1,713	9.31	-4.38
People's Movement against the EU	1,168	6.35	+1.08
Social Liberals	957	5.20	+1.98
Liberal Alliance	515	2.80	+2.11
Total	18,400		

2009 European Parliament election in Denmark

Parties	Vote		
Parties	Votes	%	+ / -
Venstre	5,041	26.46	
Social Democrats	3,746	19.67	
Danish People's Party	3,019	15.85	
Green Left	2,607	13.69	
Conservatives	2,534	13.30	
People's Movement against the EU	1,004	5.27	
Social Liberals	613	3.22	
June Movement	352	1.85	
Liberal Alliance	132	0.69	
Total	19,048		

== Referendums ==
2022 Danish European Union opt-out referendum

Option	Votes	%
✓ YES	15,996	67.23
X NO	7,797	32.77

2015 Danish European Union opt-out referendum

Option	Votes	%
X NO	12,479	52.87
✓ YES	11,123	47.13

2014 Danish Unified Patent Court membership referendum

Option	Votes	%
✓ YES	11,752	65.96
X NO	6,064	34.04

2009 Danish Act of Succession referendum

Option	Votes	%
✓ YES	16,002	87.54
X NO	2,277	12.46
