= Viborg East (nomination district) =

- Viborg Øst
- Nomination district constituency for the Folketing
- Location of Viborg East within West Jutland

- Location of West Jutland within Denmark
- Municipalities: Viborg
- Constituency: West Jutland
- Electorate: 32,889 (2022)

Current constituency
- Created: 2007

Viborg East nominating district is one of the 92 nominating districts that was created for Danish elections following the 2007 municipal reform It is one of the two nominating districts in Viborg Municipality, the other being Viborg West.

In general elections, the district is a strong area for parties commonly associated with the blue bloc, and prior to the 2022 election, Venstre had always won the most votes.

== General elections results ==
=== General elections in the 2020s ===
2022 Danish general election

Parties	Vote		
Parties	Votes	%	+ / -
Social Democrats	6,991	24.94	+0.62
Conservatives	4,631	16.52	-0.99
Venstre	4,517	16.12	-9.90
Denmark Democrats	3,489	12.45	New
Liberal Alliance	1,858	6.63	+4.67
Green Left	1,800	6.42	-0.26
Moderates	1,475	5.26	New
New Right	938	3.35	+1.88
Red–Green Alliance	541	1.93	-0.99
Danish People's Party	520	1.86	-6.24
The Alternative	486	1.73	+0.11
Social Liberals	467	1.67	-2.97
Christian Democrats	246	0.88	-2.11
Karen Predbjørn Klarbæk	34	0.12	New
Independent Greens	33	0.12	New
Total	28,026		

=== General elections in the 2010s ===
2019 Danish general election

Parties	Vote		
Parties	Votes	%	+ / -
Venstre	7,197	26.02	+0.73
Social Democrats	6,727	24.32	+1.14
Conservatives	4,844	17.51	+5.68
Danish People's Party	2,240	8.10	-11.48
Green Left	1,848	6.68	+2.87
Social Liberals	1,284	4.64	+1.80
Christian Democrats	827	2.99	+1.72
Red–Green Alliance	808	2.92	-1.05
Liberal Alliance	543	1.96	-3.66
The Alternative	447	1.62	-0.95
New Right	406	1.47	New
Stram Kurs	353	1.28	New
Klaus Riskær Pedersen Party	140	0.51	New
Total	27,664		

2015 Danish general election

Parties	Vote		
Parties	Votes	%	+ / -
Venstre	7,042	25.29	-11.93
Social Democrats	6,453	23.18	+0.86
Danish People's Party	5,452	19.58	+7.85
Conservatives	3,293	11.83	+8.28
Liberal Alliance	1,565	5.62	+0.85
Red–Green Alliance	1,106	3.97	+0.63
Green Left	1,060	3.81	-3.80
Social Liberals	792	2.84	-5.30
The Alternative	716	2.57	New
Christian Democrats	354	1.27	0.00
Erik Sputnik	10	0.04	New
Total	27,843		

2011 Danish general election

Parties	Vote		
Parties	Votes	%	+ / -
Venstre	10,465	37.22	-1.95
Social Democrats	6,275	22.32	-0.44
Danish People's Party	3,297	11.73	-0.89
Social Liberals	2,288	8.14	+4.01
Green Left	2,141	7.61	-0.71
Liberal Alliance	1,342	4.77	+2.65
Conservatives	998	3.55	-4.78
Red–Green Alliance	940	3.34	+2.66
Christian Democrats	358	1.27	-0.59
Rikke Cramer Christiansen	13	0.05	New
Ejgil Kølbæk	2	0.01	0.00
Total	28,119		

=== General elections in the 2000s ===
2007 Danish general election

Parties	Vote		
Parties	Votes	%	+ / -
Venstre	10,811	39.17	
Social Democrats	6,283	22.76	
Danish People's Party	3,482	12.62	
Conservatives	2,299	8.33	
Green Left	2,295	8.32	
Social Liberals	1,139	4.13	
New Alliance	586	2.12	
Christian Democrats	514	1.86	
Red–Green Alliance	187	0.68	
Ejgil Kølbæk	4	0.01	
Total	27,600		

== European Parliament elections results ==
2024 European Parliament election in Denmark

Parties	Vote		
Parties	Votes	%	+ / -
Venstre	3,913	20.01	-11.99
Social Democrats	2,881	14.74	-5.88
Denmark Democrats	2,835	14.5	New
Green Left	2,361	12.08	+2.65
Conservatives	2,319	11.86	+2.16
Liberal Alliance	1,378	7.05	+5.20
Danish People's Party	1,257	6.43	-5.01
Moderates	929	4.75	New
Social Liberals	860	4.40	-3.16
Red–Green Alliance	529	2.71	-0.16
The Alternative	290	1.48	-0.35
Total	19,552		

2019 European Parliament election in Denmark

Parties	Vote		
Parties	Votes	%	+ / -
Venstre	6,886	32.00	+4.77
Social Democrats	4,437	20.62	+3.33
Danish People's Party	2,461	11.44	-15.21
Conservatives	2,088	9.70	+0.66
Green Left	2,028	9.43	+1.40
Social Liberals	1,626	7.56	+2.94
Red–Green Alliance	618	2.87	New
People's Movement against the EU	580	2.70	-2.10
Liberal Alliance	398	1.85	-0.49
The Alternative	394	1.83	New
Total	21,516		

2014 European Parliament election in Denmark

Parties	Vote		
Parties	Votes	%	+ / -
Venstre	4,884	27.23	-6.48
Danish People's Party	4,779	26.65	+13.37
Social Democrats	3,100	17.29	-2.40
Conservatives	1,621	9.04	-2.85
Green Left	1,440	8.03	-3.27
People's Movement against the EU	860	4.80	+0.20
Social Liberals	829	4.62	+1.25
Liberal Alliance	420	2.34	+1.91
Total	17,933		

2009 European Parliament election in Denmark

Parties	Vote		
Parties	Votes	%	+ / -
Venstre	6,445	33.71	
Social Democrats	3,765	19.69	
Danish People's Party	2,540	13.28	
Conservatives	2,274	11.89	
Green Left	2,161	11.30	
People's Movement against the EU	879	4.60	
Social Liberals	645	3.37	
June Movement	330	1.73	
Liberal Alliance	82	0.43	
Total	19,121		

== Referendums ==
2022 Danish European Union opt-out referendum

Option	Votes	%
✓ YES	14,892	67.12
X NO	7,294	32.88

2015 Danish European Union opt-out referendum

Option	Votes	%
✓ YES	11,707	50.91
X NO	11,290	49.09

2014 Danish Unified Patent Court membership referendum

Option	Votes	%
✓ YES	12,000	68.61
X NO	5,491	31.39

2009 Danish Act of Succession referendum

Option	Votes	%
✓ YES	16,181	88.06
X NO	2,195	11.94
