= Helsingør (nomination district) =

Danish nomination district

- Helsingør
- Nomination district constituency for the Folketing
- Location of Helsingør within North Zealand

- Location of North Zealand within Denmark
- Municipalities: Helsingør
- Constituency: North Zealand
- Electorate: 46,889 (2022)

Current constituency
- Created: 1849 (as constituency); 1920 (as nomination district)

Helsingør nominating district is one of the 92 nominating districts that exists for Danish elections following the 2007 municipal reform. It consists of Helsingør Municipality. It was created in 1849 as a constituency, and has been a nomination district since 1920. It is the only current nomination district whose boundaries have been unchanged since 1849.

In general elections, the district tends to vote close to the national result when looking at the voter split between the two blocs.

== General elections results ==
=== General elections in the 2020s ===
2022 Danish general election

Parties	Vote		
Parties	Votes	%	+ / -
Social Democrats	10,702	27.76	+3.01
Moderates	4,200	10.89	New
Venstre	4,131	10.71	-6.19
Liberal Alliance	3,254	8.44	+5.51
Green Left	2,976	7.72	+0.53
Conservatives	2,905	7.53	-3.49
Red–Green Alliance	2,036	5.28	-2.21
Denmark Democrats	1,816	4.71	New
Social Liberals	1,801	4.67	-6.30
The Alternative	1,663	4.31	+1.11
New Right	1,543	4.00	+0.22
Danish People's Party	964	2.50	-5.63
Independent Greens	422	1.09	New
Christian Democrats	96	0.25	-0.52
Jayseth Lotus Arrose Simoysano	37	0.10	New
Katjalivah Elleyhansen	8	0.02	New
Total	38,554		

=== General elections in the 2010s ===
2019 Danish general election

Parties	Vote		
Parties	Votes	%	+ / -
Social Democrats	9,520	24.75	-0.57
Venstre	6,500	16.90	+2.39
Conservatives	4,237	11.02	+4.78
Social Liberals	4,219	10.97	+5.65
Danish People's Party	3,127	8.13	-12.82
Red–Green Alliance	2,881	7.49	-0.67
Green Left	2,766	7.19	+3.18
New Right	1,453	3.78	New
The Alternative	1,229	3.20	-2.24
Liberal Alliance	1,126	2.93	-6.71
Stram Kurs	672	1.75	New
Klaus Riskær Pedersen Party	405	1.05	New
Christian Democrats	297	0.77	+0.39
Gert Lassen	26	0.07	+0.06
Hans Frederik Brobjerg	5	0.01	New
Total	38,463		

2015 Danish general election

Parties	Vote		
Parties	Votes	%	+ / -
Social Democrats	9,688	25.32	+1.67
Danish People's Party	8,019	20.95	+9.20
Venstre	5,552	14.51	-11.38
Liberal Alliance	3,690	9.64	+3.54
Red–Green Alliance	3,124	8.16	+1.74
Conservatives	2,388	6.24	-0.10
The Alternative	2,081	5.44	New
Social Liberals	2,036	5.32	-5.70
Green Left	1,536	4.01	-4.55
Christian Democrats	144	0.38	+0.13
Aleks Jensen	9	0.02	New
Gert Lassen	2	0.01	New
Total	38,269		

2011 Danish general election

Parties	Vote		
Parties	Votes	%	+ / -
Venstre	9,953	25.89	+3.31
Social Democrats	9,092	23.65	-1.61
Danish People's Party	4,519	11.75	-1.95
Social Liberals	4,237	11.02	+4.15
Green Left	3,289	8.56	-4.29
Red–Green Alliance	2,469	6.42	+3.90
Conservatives	2,436	6.34	-5.40
Liberal Alliance	2,344	6.10	+2.03
Christian Democrats	95	0.25	-0.16
Bjarne Holm	11	0.03	New
Total	38,445		

=== General elections in the 2000s ===
2007 Danish general election

Parties	Vote		
Parties	Votes	%	+ / -
Social Democrats	9,523	25.26	+0.58
Venstre	8,511	22.58	-2.77
Danish People's Party	5,163	13.70	-0.33
Green Left	4,844	12.85	+7.15
Conservatives	4,425	11.74	+0.15
Social Liberals	2,590	6.87	-5.36
New Alliance	1,535	4.07	New
Red–Green Alliance	949	2.52	-1.11
Christian Democrats	156	0.41	-0.52
Total	37,696		

2005 Danish general election

Parties	Vote		
Parties	Votes	%	+ / -
Venstre	9,296	25.35	-1.59
Social Democrats	9,051	24.68	-4.83
Danish People's Party	5,145	14.03	+1.93
Social Liberals	4,486	12.23	+5.92
Conservatives	4,360	11.89	+0.23
Green Left	2,091	5.70	-1.38
Red–Green Alliance	1,332	3.63	+1.20
Centre Democrats	477	1.30	-0.83
Christian Democrats	342	0.93	-0.49
Minority Party	87	0.24	New
Total	36,667		

2001 Danish general election

Parties	Vote		
Parties	Votes	%	+ / -
Social Democrats	11,139	29.51	-6.97
Venstre	10,169	26.94	+10.27
Danish People's Party	4,569	12.10	+4.03
Conservatives	4,403	11.66	-5.48
Green Left	2,673	7.08	-1.21
Social Liberals	2,382	6.31	+2.91
Red–Green Alliance	917	2.43	-0.33
Centre Democrats	804	2.13	-2.16
Christian People's Party	535	1.42	+0.14
Progress Party	160	0.42	-0.98
Total	37,751		

=== General elections in the 1990s ===
1998 Danish general election

Parties	Vote		
Parties	Votes	%	+ / -
Social Democrats	13,352	36.48	+1.81
Conservatives	6,275	17.14	-6.54
Venstre	6,100	16.67	+1.52
Green Left	3,035	8.29	-0.44
Danish People's Party	2,954	8.07	New
Centre Democrats	1,570	4.29	+1.32
Social Liberals	1,245	3.40	-1.00
Red–Green Alliance	1,011	2.76	-1.07
Progress Party	511	1.40	-3.99
Christian People's Party	468	1.28	+0.19
Democratic Renewal	72	0.20	New
Sabina Schilliing Nybo Rasmussen	10	0.03	New
Total	36,603		

1994 Danish general election

Parties	Vote		
Parties	Votes	%	+ / -
Social Democrats	12,262	34.67	-4.24
Conservatives	8,375	23.68	+0.58
Venstre	5,358	15.15	+5.83
Green Left	3,087	8.73	-0.46
Progress Party	1,907	5.39	+1.10
Social Liberals	1,556	4.40	+1.34
Red–Green Alliance	1,356	3.83	+1.74
Centre Democrats	1,050	2.97	-2.44
Christian People's Party	385	1.09	-0.05
Jørgen Ruberg	32	0.09	New
Total	35,368		

1990 Danish general election

Parties	Vote		
Parties	Votes	%	+ / -
Social Democrats	13,323	38.91	+6.29
Conservatives	7,910	23.10	-0.48
Venstre	3,192	9.32	+3.17
Green Left	3,148	9.19	-5.54
Centre Democrats	1,852	5.41	+0.40
Progress Party	1,468	4.29	-2.31
Social Liberals	1,048	3.06	-2.77
Red–Green Alliance	715	2.09	New
Common Course	642	1.87	-0.95
Christian People's Party	392	1.14	+0.13
The Greens	354	1.03	+0.77
Justice Party of Denmark	184	0.54	New
Humanist Party	14	0.04	New
Total	34,242		

=== General elections in the 1980s ===
1988 Danish general election

Parties	Vote		
Parties	Votes	%	+ / -
Social Democrats	11,482	32.62	+2.37
Conservatives	8,299	23.58	-1.18
Green Left	5,183	14.73	-2.18
Progress Party	2,323	6.60	+3.54
Venstre	2,166	6.15	+1.91
Social Liberals	2,053	5.83	-0.87
Centre Democrats	1,762	5.01	-0.03
Common Course	992	2.82	-0.03
Christian People's Party	356	1.01	-0.23
Communist Party of Denmark	326	0.93	-0.10
Left Socialists	155	0.44	-0.75
The Greens	90	0.26	-1.66
Lars Kristensen	11	0.03	+0.02
Total	35,198		

1987 Danish general election

Parties	Vote		
Parties	Votes	%	+ / -
Social Democrats	11,041	30.25	-4.67
Conservatives	9,037	24.76	-1.35
Green Left	6,172	16.91	+3.16
Social Liberals	2,446	6.70	+1.08
Centre Democrats	1,840	5.04	+1.65
Venstre	1,549	4.24	-2.88
Progress Party	1,118	3.06	+0.62
Common Course	1,042	2.85	New
The Greens	699	1.92	New
Christian People's Party	451	1.24	-0.09
Left Socialists	435	1.19	-1.65
Communist Party of Denmark	377	1.03	+0.22
Justice Party of Denmark	153	0.42	-1.11
Humanist Party	86	0.24	New
Marxist–Leninists Party	28	0.08	-0.01
Socialist Workers Party	20	0.05	0.00
Lars Kristensen	5	0.01	+0.01
Total	36,499		

1984 Danish general election

Parties	Vote		
Parties	Votes	%	+ / -
Social Democrats	12,612	34.92	-1.85
Conservatives	9,430	26.11	+8.25
Green Left	4,968	13.75	+0.18
Venstre	2,570	7.12	+1.35
Social Liberals	2,031	5.62	+0.69
Centre Democrats	1,223	3.39	-4.01
Left Socialists	1,025	2.84	+0.10
Progress Party	881	2.44	-4.84
Justice Party of Denmark	552	1.53	+0.13
Christian People's Party	479	1.33	+0.53
Communist Party of Denmark	291	0.81	-0.46
Marxist–Leninists Party	31	0.09	New
Socialist Workers Party	19	0.05	-0.01
Lars Bjørnbak Hallstein	3	0.01	New
Leni Thomsen	3	0.01	New
Lars Kristensen	0	0.00	New
Total	36,118		

1981 Danish general election

Parties	Vote		
Parties	Votes	%	+ / -
Social Democrats	12,425	36.77	-6.43
Conservatives	6,035	17.86	+3.59
Green Left	4,587	13.57	+6.74
Centre Democrats	2,502	7.40	+4.54
Progress Party	2,460	7.28	-1.40
Venstre	1,949	5.77	-2.17
Social Liberals	1,667	4.93	-0.20
Left Socialists	925	2.74	-1.66
Justice Party of Denmark	472	1.40	-1.37
Communist Party of Denmark	428	1.27	-1.08
Christian People's Party	270	0.80	-0.32
Communist Workers Party	56	0.17	-0.27
Socialist Workers Party	19	0.06	New
Total	33,795		

=== General elections in the 1970s ===
1979 Danish general election

Parties	Vote		
Parties	Votes	%	+ / -
Social Democrats	14,713	43.20	+1.55
Conservatives	4,861	14.27	+5.32
Progress Party	2,957	8.68	-4.06
Venstre	2,705	7.94	+0.18
Green Left	2,326	6.83	+2.55
Social Liberals	1,747	5.13	+1.91
Left Socialists	1,497	4.40	+1.34
Centre Democrats	974	2.86	-3.64
Justice Party of Denmark	942	2.77	-0.87
Communist Party of Denmark	801	2.35	-3.44
Christian People's Party	383	1.12	-0.54
Communist Workers Party	149	0.44	New
Total	34,055		

1977 Danish general election

Parties	Vote		
Parties	Votes	%	+ / -
Social Democrats	13,949	41.65	-6.36
Progress Party	4,267	12.74	+3.09
Conservatives	2,996	8.95	+4.67
Venstre	2,600	7.76	-7.84
Centre Democrats	2,176	6.50	+5.07
Communist Party of Denmark	1,938	5.79	+0.55
Green Left	1,433	4.28	-0.43
Justice Party of Denmark	1,218	3.64	+2.17
Social Liberals	1,077	3.22	-1.91
Left Socialists	1,025	3.06	+1.18
Christian People's Party	556	1.66	-0.91
Pensioners' Party	245	0.73	New
Kaj Boriths-Sørensen	13	0.04	New
Total	33,493		

1975 Danish general election

Parties	Vote		
Parties	Votes	%	+ / -
Social Democrats	19,785	48.01	+19.17
Venstre	6,429	15.60	+7.18
Progress Party	3,977	9.65	-4.85
Communist Party of Denmark	2,159	5.24	-0.41
Social Liberals	2,116	5.13	-4.71
Green Left	1,939	4.71	-2.45
Conservatives	1,764	4.28	-4.88
Christian People's Party	1,059	2.57	+0.13
Left Socialists	776	1.88	+0.02
Justice Party of Denmark	604	1.47	-1.57
Centre Democrats	589	1.43	-7.67
H. Lindholt	12	0.03	New
Total	41,209		

1973 Danish general election

Parties	Vote		
Parties	Votes	%	+ / -
Social Democrats	9,293	28.84	-9.56
Progress Party	4,672	14.50	New
Social Liberals	3,172	9.84	-4.18
Conservatives	2,952	9.16	-8.35
Centre Democrats	2,932	9.10	New
Venstre	2,713	8.42	-1.06
Green Left	2,309	7.16	-5.94
Communist Party of Denmark	1,820	5.65	+3.02
Justice Party of Denmark	981	3.04	+1.10
Christian People's Party	786	2.44	+1.32
Left Socialists	598	1.86	+0.04
Total	32,228		

1971 Danish general election

Parties	Vote		
Parties	Votes	%	+ / -
Social Democrats	11,544	38.40	+3.31
Conservatives	5,264	17.51	-2.68
Social Liberals	4,214	14.02	-1.06
Green Left	3,938	13.10	+3.73
Venstre	2,849	9.48	-2.89
Communist Party of Denmark	792	2.63	+0.39
Justice Party of Denmark	583	1.94	+1.44
Left Socialists	546	1.82	-1.44
Christian People's Party	336	1.12	New
Total	30,066		

=== General elections in the 1960s ===
1968 Danish general election

Parties	Vote		
Parties	Votes	%	+ / -
Social Democrats	10,139	35.09	-3.94
Conservatives	5,833	20.19	+2.60
Social Liberals	4,356	15.08	+8.59
Venstre	3,575	12.37	-1.20
Green Left	2,708	9.37	-7.89
Left Socialists	942	3.26	New
Communist Party of Denmark	646	2.24	+0.61
Liberal Centre	472	1.63	-1.37
Justice Party of Denmark	145	0.50	-0.01
Independent Party	78	0.27	-0.63
Total	28,894		

1966 Danish general election

Parties	Vote		
Parties	Votes	%	+ / -
Social Democrats	10,892	39.03	-7.57
Conservatives	4,910	17.59	+0.42
Green Left	4,817	17.26	+7.87
Venstre	3,788	13.57	-3.13
Social Liberals	1,810	6.49	+2.09
Liberal Centre	836	3.00	New
Communist Party of Denmark	455	1.63	-1.11
Independent Party	250	0.90	-0.58
Justice Party of Denmark	141	0.51	-0.55
Erik Hoffmeyer	4	0.01	New
P. Lüchow	2	0.01	+0.01
Carl Møller	1	0.00	-0.04
Total	27,906		

1964 Danish general election

Parties	Vote		
Parties	Votes	%	+ / -
Social Democrats	11,569	46.60	-3.50
Conservatives	4,263	17.17	+2.14
Venstre	4,146	16.70	+2.64
Green Left	2,331	9.39	-0.48
Social Liberals	1,092	4.40	-0.28
Communist Party of Denmark	681	2.74	+0.45
Independent Party	368	1.48	-0.91
Justice Party of Denmark	262	1.06	-0.53
Danish Unity	101	0.41	New
Carl Møller	11	0.04	New
P. Lüchow	1	0.00	New
Total	24,825		

1960 Danish general election

Parties	Vote		
Parties	Votes	%	+ / -
Social Democrats	11,130	50.10	+1.24
Conservatives	3,339	15.03	+0.24
Venstre	3,124	14.06	-2.55
Green Left	2,192	9.87	New
Social Liberals	1,039	4.68	-3.57
Independent Party	530	2.39	+1.04
Communist Party of Denmark	509	2.29	-2.89
Justice Party of Denmark	354	1.59	-3.37
Total	22,217		

=== General elections in the 1950s ===
1957 Danish general election

Parties	Vote		
Parties	Votes	%	+ / -
Social Democrats	9,650	48.86	-2.85
Venstre	3,281	16.61	+3.42
Conservatives	2,921	14.79	-0.04
Social Liberals	1,630	8.25	-0.71
Communist Party of Denmark	1,023	5.18	-2.02
Justice Party of Denmark	979	4.96	+2.25
Independent Party	267	1.35	-0.06
Total	19,751		

September 1953 Danish Folketing election

Parties	Vote		
Parties	Votes	%	+ / -
Social Democrats	9,273	51.71	+2.35
Conservatives	2,659	14.83	-0.37
Venstre	2,365	13.19	+1.43
Social Liberals	1,606	8.96	-2.30
Communist Party of Denmark	1,292	7.20	-0.72
Justice Party of Denmark	486	2.71	-0.98
Independent Party	252	1.41	New
Total	17,933		

April 1953 Danish Folketing election

Parties	Vote		
Parties	Votes	%	+ / -
Social Democrats	8,435	49.36	-0.94
Conservatives	2,597	15.20	-1.25
Venstre	2,010	11.76	+1.73
Social Liberals	1,924	11.26	-0.07
Communist Party of Denmark	1,354	7.92	+0.29
Justice Party of Denmark	631	3.69	-0.57
Danish Unity	139	0.81	New
Total	17,090		

1950 Danish Folketing election

Parties	Vote		
Parties	Votes	%	+ / -
Social Democrats	8,327	50.30	-1.21
Conservatives	2,723	16.45	+4.09
Social Liberals	1,876	11.33	+4.20
Venstre	1,660	10.03	-4.38
Communist Party of Denmark	1,263	7.63	-3.98
Justice Party of Denmark	705	4.26	+2.43
Total	16,554		

=== General elections in the 1940s ===
1947 Danish Folketing election

Parties	Vote		
Parties	Votes	%	+ / -
Social Democrats	8,318	51.51	+12.46
Venstre	2,327	14.41	+4.77
Conservatives	1,995	12.36	-4.90
Communist Party of Denmark	1,874	11.61	-8.35
Social Liberals	1,152	7.13	-2.78
Justice Party of Denmark	296	1.83	+1.30
Danish Unity	185	1.15	-2.50
Total	16,147		

1945 Danish Folketing election

Parties	Vote		
Parties	Votes	%	+ / -
Social Democrats	6,173	39.05	-17.19
Communist Party of Denmark	3,155	19.96	New
Conservatives	2,729	17.26	-4.36
Social Liberals	1,566	9.91	-0.22
Venstre	1,524	9.64	+4.22
Danish Unity	577	3.65	-0.57
Justice Party of Denmark	84	0.53	-0.07
Total	15,808		

1943 Danish Folketing election

Parties	Vote		
Parties	Votes	%	+ / -
Social Democrats	8,683	56.24	-0.12
Conservatives	3,337	21.62	+2.06
Social Liberals	1,564	10.13	-1.93
Venstre	836	5.42	+0.26
Danish Unity	651	4.22	+4.04
National Socialist Workers' Party of Denmark	245	1.59	+0.36
Justice Party of Denmark	92	0.60	-0.24
Farmers' Party	30	0.19	-0.65
Total	15,438		

=== General elections in the 1930s ===
1939 Danish Folketing election

Parties	Vote		
Parties	Votes	%	+ / -
Social Democrats	7,691	56.36	-4.67
Conservatives	2,669	19.56	-1.23
Social Liberals	1,646	12.06	+3.17
Venstre	704	5.16	-0.07
Communist Party of Denmark	419	3.07	+0.80
National Socialist Workers' Party of Denmark	168	1.23	+0.76
Farmers' Party	115	0.84	+0.39
Justice Party of Denmark	115	0.84	-0.03
National Cooperation	94	0.69	New
Danish Unity	24	0.18	New
Total	13,645		

1935 Danish Folketing election

Parties	Vote		
Parties	Votes	%	+ / -
Social Democrats	7,835	61.03	+4.54
Conservatives	2,669	20.79	+0.15
Social Liberals	1,141	8.89	-0.66
Venstre	672	5.23	-4.99
Communist Party of Denmark	292	2.27	0.00
Justice Party of Denmark	112	0.87	+0.04
National Socialist Workers' Party of Denmark	60	0.47	New
Independent People's Party	58	0.45	New
Total	12,839		

1932 Danish Folketing election

Parties	Vote		
Parties	Votes	%	+ / -
Social Democrats	6,722	56.49	+0.08
Conservatives	2,456	20.64	-0.33
Venstre	1,216	10.22	-1.46
Social Liberals	1,137	9.55	-0.81
Communist Party of Denmark	270	2.27	New
Justice Party of Denmark	99	0.83	+0.25
Total	11,900		

=== General elections in the 1920s ===
1929 Danish Folketing election

Parties	Vote		
Parties	Votes	%	+ / -
Social Democrats	6,276	56.41	+6.90
Conservatives	2,333	20.97	-5.87
Venstre	1,299	11.68	+0.90
Social Liberals	1,152	10.36	-2.28
Justice Party of Denmark	65	0.58	+0.36
Total	11,125		

1926 Danish Folketing election

Parties	Vote		
Parties	Votes	%	+ / -
Social Democrats	5,097	49.51	+2.97
Conservatives	2,763	26.84	+0.58
Social Liberals	1,301	12.64	-2.97
Venstre	1,110	10.78	+0.17
Justice Party of Denmark	23	0.22	New
Independence Party	0	0.00	New
Total	10,294		

1924 Danish Folketing election

Parties	Vote		
Parties	Votes	%	+ / -
Social Democrats	4,660	46.54	+2.63
Conservatives	2,629	26.26	-1.07
Social Liberals	1,563	15.61	+2.67
Venstre	1,062	10.61	-1.56
Farmer Party	54	0.54	New
Communist Party of Denmark	44	0.44	New
Total	10,012		

September 1920 Danish Folketing election

Parties	Vote		
Parties	Votes	%	+ / -
Social Democrats	4,059	43.91	+1.92
Conservatives	2,526	27.33	-4.11
Social Liberals	1,196	12.94	+2.25
Venstre	1,125	12.17	-0.89
Danish Left Socialist Party	166	1.80	New
Industry Party	131	1.42	-0.26
Total	9,244		

July 1920 Danish Folketing election

Parties	Vote		
Parties	Votes	%	+ / -
Social Democrats	3,308	41.99	+2.05
Conservatives	2,477	31.44	-0.82
Venstre	1,029	13.06	+1.08
Social Liberals	842	10.69	-2.04
Industry Party	132	1.68	0.00
S. J. Petersen	89	1.13	New
Total	7,878		

April 1920 Danish Folketing election

Parties	Vote	
Parties	Votes	%
Social Democrats	3,280	39.94
Conservatives	2,649	32.26
Social Liberals	1,045	12.73
Venstre	984	11.98
Industry Party	138	1.68
Elias S. Nielsen	116	1.41
Total	8,212	

== European Parliament elections results ==
2024 European Parliament election in Denmark

Parties	Vote		
Parties	Votes	%	+ / -
Green Left	5,331	19.07	+5.20
Social Democrats	4,034	14.43	-5.43
Conservatives	3,372	12.06	+2.19
Venstre	2,921	10.45	-7.24
Moderates	2,318	8.29	New
Social Liberals	2,305	8.25	-3.86
Liberal Alliance	2,199	7.87	+5.76
Red–Green Alliance	1,968	7.04	+0.88
Danish People's Party	1,780	6.37	-4.06
Denmark Democrats	960	3.43	New
The Alternative	763	2.73	-0.93
Total	27,951		

2019 European Parliament election in Denmark

Parties	Vote		
Parties	Votes	%	+ / -
Social Democrats	6,105	19.86	+1.69
Venstre	5,437	17.69	+5.42
Green Left	4,263	13.87	+2.21
Social Liberals	3,722	12.11	+4.38
Danish People's Party	3,205	10.43	-17.11
Conservatives	3,035	9.87	-0.86
Red–Green Alliance	1,892	6.16	New
People's Movement against the EU	1,305	4.25	-4.11
The Alternative	1,125	3.66	New
Liberal Alliance	650	2.11	-1.43
Total	30,739		

2014 European Parliament election in Denmark

Parties	Vote		
Parties	Votes	%	+ / -
Danish People's Party	7,013	27.54	+11.95
Social Democrats	4,627	18.17	-1.55
Venstre	3,125	12.27	-4.04
Green Left	2,970	11.66	-5.67
Conservatives	2,733	10.73	-3.37
People's Movement against the EU	2,129	8.36	-0.28
Social Liberals	1,968	7.73	+2.52
Liberal Alliance	901	3.54	+2.83
Total	25,466		

2009 European Parliament election in Denmark

Parties	Vote		
Parties	Votes	%	+ / -
Social Democrats	5,078	19.72	-12.41
Green Left	4,464	17.33	+9.17
Venstre	4,200	16.31	+4.28
Danish People's Party	4,016	15.59	+8.53
Conservatives	3,630	14.10	-2.36
People's Movement against the EU	2,224	8.64	+0.54
Social Liberals	1,342	5.21	-1.33
June Movement	615	2.39	-6.59
Liberal Alliance	183	0.71	New
Total	25,752		

2004 European Parliament election in Denmark

Parties	Vote		
Parties	Votes	%	+ / -
Social Democrats	6,956	32.13	+17.28
Conservatives	3,563	16.46	+6.28
Venstre	2,604	12.03	-6.39
June Movement	1,945	8.98	-6.58
Green Left	1,767	8.16	+1.18
People's Movement against the EU	1,754	8.10	-4.54
Danish People's Party	1,528	7.06	+0.88
Social Liberals	1,416	6.54	-3.17
Christian Democrats	117	0.54	-0.62
Total	21,650		

1999 European Parliament election in Denmark

Parties	Vote		
Parties	Votes	%	+ / -
Venstre	3,996	18.42	+6.46
June Movement	3,375	15.56	+0.88
Social Democrats	3,221	14.85	-1.57
People's Movement against the EU	2,741	12.64	-1.10
Conservatives	2,209	10.18	-11.74
Social Liberals	2,107	9.71	+0.69
Green Left	1,515	6.98	-1.84
Danish People's Party	1,341	6.18	New
Centre Democrats	934	4.31	+3.58
Christian Democrats	252	1.16	+0.64
Progress Party	100	0.46	-1.73
Total	21,691		

1994 European Parliament election in Denmark

Parties	Vote		
Parties	Votes	%	+ / -
Conservatives	5,039	21.92	+6.14
Social Democrats	3,773	16.42	-8.54
June Movement	3,374	14.68	New
People's Movement against the EU	3,158	13.74	-8.73
Venstre	2,748	11.96	+1.57
Social Liberals	2,074	9.02	+6.28
Green Left	2,027	8.82	-1.25
Progress Party	504	2.19	-1.83
Centre Democrats	168	0.73	-7.35
Christian Democrats	120	0.52	-0.97
Total	22,985		

1989 European Parliament election in Denmark

Parties	Vote		
Parties	Votes	%	+ / -
Social Democrats	4,995	24.96	+6.48
People's Movement against the EU	4,497	22.47	-6.15
Conservatives	3,158	15.78	-6.70
Venstre	2,080	10.39	+4.83
Green Left	2,015	10.07	-0.80
Centre Democrats	1,617	8.08	+2.53
Progress Party	804	4.02	+1.03
Social Liberals	549	2.74	-0.11
Christian Democrats	299	1.49	0.00
Total	20,014		

1984 European Parliament election in Denmark

Parties	Vote	
Parties	Votes	%
People's Movement against the EU	6,375	28.62
Conservatives	5,007	22.48
Social Democrats	4,118	18.48
Green Left	2,422	10.87
Venstre	1,239	5.56
Centre Democrats	1,236	5.55
Progress Party	667	2.99
Social Liberals	635	2.85
Christian Democrats	331	1.49
Left Socialists	248	1.11
Total	22,278	

== Referendums ==
2022 Danish European Union opt-out referendum

Option	Votes	%
✓ YES	21,396	69.28
X NO	9,488	30.72

2015 Danish European Union opt-out referendum

Option	Votes	%
X NO	16,814	52.13
✓ YES	15,438	47.87

2014 Danish Unified Patent Court membership referendum

Option	Votes	%
✓ YES	15,733	63.06
X NO	9,218	36.94

2009 Danish Act of Succession referendum

Option	Votes	%
✓ YES	19,819	84.35
X NO	3,676	15.65

2000 Danish euro referendum

Option	Votes	%
X NO	20,270	53.44
✓ YES	17,658	46.56

1998 Danish Amsterdam Treaty referendum

Option	Votes	%
✓ YES	17,100	52.19
X NO	15,664	47.81

1993 Danish Maastricht Treaty referendum

Option	Votes	%
✓ YES	19,568	53.23
X NO	17,193	46.77

1992 Danish Maastricht Treaty referendum

Option	Votes	%
X NO	18,815	53.08
✓ YES	16,633	46.92

1986 Danish Single European Act referendum

Option	Votes	%
X NO	16,393	52.11
✓ YES	15,063	47.89

1972 Danish European Communities membership referendum

Option	Votes	%
✓ YES	17,753	54.33
X NO	14,924	45.67

1953 Danish constitutional and electoral age referendum

Option	Votes	%
✓ YES	10,417	76.89
X NO	3,131	23.11
21 years	7,559	53.67
23 years	6,526	46.33

1939 Danish constitutional referendum

Option	Votes	%
✓ YES	10,532	94.32
X NO	634	5.68
