= Faaborg (nomination district) =

- Faaborg
- Nomination district constituency for the Folketing
- Location of Faaborg within Funen

- Location of Funen within Denmark
- Municipalities: Faaborg-Midtfyn; Ærø
- Constituency: Funen
- Electorate: 43,974 (2022)

Current constituency
- Created: 1849 (as constituency); 1920 (as nomination district)

Faaborg nominating district is one of the 92 nominating districts that exists for Danish elections following the 2007 municipal reform. It consists of Faaborg and Ærø municipality. It was created in 1849 as a constituency, and has been a nomination district since 1920, though its boundaries have been changed since then. Between 1915 and 1970 it was known as Ærøskøbing-Fåborg.

In general elections, the district tends to vote close to the national result when looking at the voting split between the two blocs.

== General elections results ==
=== General elections in the 2020s ===
2022 Danish general election

Parties	Vote		
Parties	Votes	%	+ / -
Social Democrats	12,218	33.43	+4.24
Venstre	4,667	12.77	-14.29
Denmark Democrats	4,127	11.29	New
Moderates	3,470	9.49	New
Green Left	2,586	7.08	+0.84
Liberal Alliance	1,870	5.12	+3.84
Conservatives	1,735	4.75	-1.05
New Right	1,477	4.04	+2.14
Red–Green Alliance	1,400	3.83	-2.16
Danish People's Party	1,065	2.91	-7.68
The Alternative	878	2.40	-0.29
Social Liberals	779	2.13	-3.31
Christian Democrats	141	0.39	-0.76
Independent Greens	99	0.27	New
Millah Kongsbach	39	0.11	New
Total	36,551		

=== General elections in the 2010s ===
2019 Danish general election

Parties	Vote		
Parties	Votes	%	+ / -
Social Democrats	10,697	29.19	+2.46
Venstre	9,915	27.06	+5.08
Danish People's Party	3,882	10.59	-12.67
Green Left	2,285	6.24	+2.24
Red–Green Alliance	2,195	5.99	-1.26
Conservatives	2,124	5.80	+1.54
Social Liberals	1,994	5.44	+2.65
The Alternative	986	2.69	-1.46
New Right	696	1.90	New
Stram Kurs	667	1.82	New
Liberal Alliance	469	1.28	-3.95
Christian Democrats	422	1.15	+0.79
Klaus Riskær Pedersen Party	313	0.85	New
Total	36,645		

2015 Danish general election

Parties	Vote		
Parties	Votes	%	+ / -
Social Democrats	9,985	26.73	+0.17
Danish People's Party	8,691	23.26	+10.26
Venstre	8,211	21.98	-6.78
Red–Green Alliance	2,710	7.25	+1.87
Liberal Alliance	1,955	5.23	+1.58
Conservatives	1,590	4.26	-0.53
The Alternative	1,549	4.15	New
Green Left	1,493	4.00	-5.31
Social Liberals	1,041	2.79	-5.25
Christian Democrats	136	0.36	-0.11
Total	37,361		

2011 Danish general election

Parties	Vote		
Parties	Votes	%	+ / -
Venstre	11,075	28.76	+2.41
Social Democrats	10,228	26.56	+1.71
Danish People's Party	5,005	13.00	-2.05
Green Left	3,586	9.31	-3.18
Social Liberals	3,096	8.04	+3.07
Red–Green Alliance	2,070	5.38	+3.93
Conservatives	1,844	4.79	-7.35
Liberal Alliance	1,405	3.65	+1.32
Christian Democrats	180	0.47	+0.12
Lars Grønbæk Larsen	12	0.03	New
Michael Ellegård	6	0.02	0.00
Total	38,507		

=== General elections in the 2000s ===
2007 Danish general election

Parties	Vote		
Parties	Votes	%	+ / -
Venstre	10,105	26.35	-3.60
Social Democrats	9,533	24.85	+0.01
Danish People's Party	5,771	15.05	+1.87
Green Left	4,791	12.49	+7.21
Conservatives	4,656	12.14	-2.32
Social Liberals	1,907	4.97	-2.40
New Alliance	892	2.33	New
Red–Green Alliance	558	1.45	-1.24
Christian Democrats	134	0.35	-0.64
Michael Ellegård	9	0.02	New
Total	38,356		

2005 Danish general election

Parties	Vote		
Parties	Votes	%	+ / -
Venstre	8,996	29.95	-1.23
Social Democrats	7,463	24.84	-2.08
Conservatives	4,345	14.46	+0.51
Danish People's Party	3,959	13.18	+1.13
Social Liberals	2,213	7.37	+3.15
Green Left	1,585	5.28	-0.43
Red–Green Alliance	809	2.69	+0.90
Centre Democrats	303	1.01	-1.08
Christian Democrats	296	0.99	-0.52
Minority Party	71	0.24	New
Total	30,040		

2001 Danish general election

Parties	Vote		
Parties	Votes	%	+ / -
Venstre	9,684	31.18	+2.51
Social Democrats	8,361	26.92	-5.69
Conservatives	4,333	13.95	+3.65
Danish People's Party	3,741	12.05	+4.52
Green Left	1,772	5.71	-0.94
Social Liberals	1,310	4.22	+0.08
Centre Democrats	649	2.09	-2.41
Red–Green Alliance	556	1.79	-0.21
Christian People's Party	470	1.51	-0.31
Progress Party	181	0.58	-0.71
Total	31,057		

=== General elections in the 1990s ===
1998 Danish general election

Parties	Vote		
Parties	Votes	%	+ / -
Social Democrats	10,119	32.61	-0.58
Venstre	8,895	28.67	+0.07
Conservatives	3,196	10.30	-4.08
Danish People's Party	2,337	7.53	New
Green Left	2,063	6.65	+1.08
Centre Democrats	1,397	4.50	+2.27
Social Liberals	1,283	4.14	-0.64
Red–Green Alliance	620	2.00	-0.47
Christian People's Party	564	1.82	+0.76
Progress Party	401	1.29	-6.37
Democratic Renewal	146	0.47	New
Svend Jensen	6	0.02	New
Total	31,027		

1994 Danish general election

Parties	Vote		
Parties	Votes	%	+ / -
Social Democrats	10,075	33.19	+0.63
Venstre	8,683	28.60	+6.54
Conservatives	4,367	14.38	-2.49
Progress Party	2,325	7.66	-0.95
Green Left	1,692	5.57	-0.34
Social Liberals	1,450	4.78	+0.37
Red–Green Alliance	751	2.47	+1.19
Centre Democrats	676	2.23	-1.71
Christian People's Party	323	1.06	-0.28
Michael Ellegård	6	0.02	New
Leif Nybo	6	0.02	New
Else Lundgaard	3	0.01	New
Bjørn Henriksen	3	0.01	New
Total	30,360		

1990 Danish general election

Parties	Vote		
Parties	Votes	%	+ / -
Social Democrats	9,831	32.56	+7.21
Venstre	6,661	22.06	+4.32
Conservatives	5,094	16.87	-4.22
Progress Party	2,599	8.61	-3.27
Green Left	1,784	5.91	-2.65
Social Liberals	1,332	4.41	-1.63
Centre Democrats	1,190	3.94	+0.35
Common Course	411	1.36	-0.53
Christian People's Party	404	1.34	+0.21
Red–Green Alliance	385	1.28	New
The Greens	303	1.00	-0.81
Justice Party of Denmark	189	0.63	New
Humanist Party	7	0.02	New
Mogens Trondhjem	2	0.01	New
Tage Abildgart	1	0.00	New
Total	30,193		

=== General elections in the 1980s ===
1988 Danish general election

Parties	Vote		
Parties	Votes	%	+ / -
Social Democrats	7,948	25.35	+0.06
Conservatives	6,611	21.09	-2.50
Venstre	5,562	17.74	+0.83
Progress Party	3,726	11.88	+5.82
Green Left	2,685	8.56	-1.36
Social Liberals	1,895	6.04	-1.01
Centre Democrats	1,124	3.59	-0.35
Common Course	594	1.89	-0.16
The Greens	568	1.81	+0.17
Christian People's Party	353	1.13	-0.45
Communist Party of Denmark	161	0.51	-0.12
Left Socialists	117	0.37	-0.35
Carl Erik Jørgensen	7	0.02	New
Total	31,351		

1987 Danish general election

Parties	Vote		
Parties	Votes	%	+ / -
Social Democrats	7,985	25.29	-0.19
Conservatives	7,448	23.59	-2.45
Venstre	5,339	16.91	-3.10
Green Left	3,133	9.92	+2.54
Social Liberals	2,227	7.05	+0.34
Progress Party	1,914	6.06	+2.22
Centre Democrats	1,245	3.94	-1.26
Common Course	647	2.05	New
The Greens	518	1.64	New
Christian People's Party	499	1.58	-0.38
Left Socialists	227	0.72	-0.85
Communist Party of Denmark	198	0.63	+0.20
Justice Party of Denmark	129	0.41	-0.90
Humanist Party	42	0.13	New
Henrik Nørregård Nielsen	7	0.02	New
Marxist–Leninists Party	6	0.02	-0.01
Socialist Workers Party	5	0.02	-0.02
Total	31,569		

1984 Danish general election

Parties	Vote		
Parties	Votes	%	+ / -
Conservatives	8,354	26.04	+10.81
Social Democrats	8,174	25.48	-1.25
Venstre	6,420	20.01	-0.02
Green Left	2,367	7.38	+0.55
Social Liberals	2,153	6.71	+0.52
Centre Democrats	1,668	5.20	-4.13
Progress Party	1,232	3.84	-6.75
Christian People's Party	630	1.96	+0.42
Left Socialists	504	1.57	+0.24
Justice Party of Denmark	419	1.31	+0.01
Communist Party of Denmark	137	0.43	-0.30
Socialist Workers Party	13	0.04	0.00
Marxist–Leninists Party	10	0.03	New
Carl Erik Jørgensen	5	0.02	New
Total	32,086		

1981 Danish general election

Parties	Vote		
Parties	Votes	%	+ / -
Social Democrats	7,961	26.73	-4.05
Venstre	5,966	20.03	-1.42
Conservatives	4,535	15.23	+2.36
Progress Party	3,154	10.59	-3.45
Centre Democrats	2,780	9.33	+5.23
Green Left	2,034	6.83	+3.24
Social Liberals	1,845	6.19	+0.42
Christian People's Party	458	1.54	-0.30
Left Socialists	395	1.33	-0.63
Justice Party of Denmark	388	1.30	-1.05
Communist Party of Denmark	216	0.73	-0.34
Communist Workers Party	40	0.13	-0.05
Socialist Workers Party	12	0.04	New
Anders Bondo Christensen	0	0.00	New
Total	29,784		

=== General elections in the 1970s ===
1979 Danish general election

Parties	Vote		
Parties	Votes	%	+ / -
Social Democrats	9,338	30.78	+2.37
Venstre	6,507	21.45	-0.03
Progress Party	4,258	14.04	-2.72
Conservatives	3,906	12.87	+2.39
Social Liberals	1,750	5.77	+0.85
Centre Democrats	1,243	4.10	-1.98
Green Left	1,090	3.59	+1.23
Justice Party of Denmark	713	2.35	-0.47
Left Socialists	596	1.96	+0.56
Christian People's Party	559	1.84	-0.98
Communist Party of Denmark	324	1.07	-0.73
Communist Workers Party	54	0.18	New
Total	30,338		

1977 Danish general election

Parties	Vote		
Parties	Votes	%	+ / -
Social Democrats	8,513	28.41	+6.01
Venstre	6,438	21.48	-13.34
Progress Party	5,022	16.76	+2.99
Conservatives	3,140	10.48	+2.93
Centre Democrats	1,821	6.08	+4.50
Social Liberals	1,473	4.92	-3.47
Justice Party of Denmark	844	2.82	+1.42
Christian People's Party	844	2.82	-1.65
Green Left	708	2.36	-0.19
Communist Party of Denmark	539	1.80	+0.01
Left Socialists	419	1.40	+0.13
Pensioners' Party	207	0.69	New
Total	29,968		

1975 Danish general election

Parties	Vote		
Parties	Votes	%	+ / -
Venstre	10,322	34.82	+14.06
Social Democrats	6,639	22.40	+4.15
Progress Party	4,082	13.77	-3.65
Social Liberals	2,488	8.39	-5.56
Conservatives	2,238	7.55	-5.29
Christian People's Party	1,324	4.47	+1.41
Green Left	755	2.55	-0.18
Communist Party of Denmark	531	1.79	+0.33
Centre Democrats	467	1.58	-4.64
Justice Party of Denmark	415	1.40	-0.97
Left Socialists	375	1.27	+0.33
Oscar Andersen	1	0.00	New
Ivan Folmer-Larsen	1	0.00	New
Gunner Pedersen	1	0.00	New
Hans Clausen Pilegaard	1	0.00	New
E. Just Jensen	0	0.00	New
Total	29,640		

1973 Danish general election

Parties	Vote		
Parties	Votes	%	+ / -
Venstre	6,111	20.76	-5.12
Social Democrats	5,372	18.25	-10.79
Progress Party	5,128	17.42	New
Social Liberals	4,106	13.95	-4.77
Conservatives	3,780	12.84	-4.78
Centre Democrats	1,831	6.22	New
Christian People's Party	900	3.06	+1.62
Green Left	804	2.73	-1.47
Justice Party of Denmark	697	2.37	+0.65
Communist Party of Denmark	429	1.46	+0.84
Left Socialists	278	0.94	+0.16
Total	29,436		

1971 Danish general election

Parties	Vote		
Parties	Votes	%	+ / -
Social Democrats	8,013	29.04	+3.44
Venstre	7,140	25.88	-6.28
Social Liberals	5,165	18.72	+3.94
Conservatives	4,861	17.62	-3.20
Green Left	1,158	4.20	+1.39
Justice Party of Denmark	474	1.72	+1.06
Christian People's Party	396	1.44	New
Left Socialists	215	0.78	+0.11
Communist Party of Denmark	172	0.62	+0.11
Total	27,594		

=== General elections in the 1960s ===
1968 Danish general election

Parties	Vote		
Parties	Votes	%	+ / -
Venstre	4,524	32.16	-0.95
Social Democrats	3,602	25.60	-5.15
Conservatives	2,929	20.82	+2.09
Social Liberals	2,079	14.78	+6.26
Green Left	396	2.81	-1.22
Independent Party	158	1.12	-1.65
Liberal Centre	122	0.87	-0.42
Left Socialists	94	0.67	New
Justice Party of Denmark	93	0.66	+0.15
Communist Party of Denmark	72	0.51	+0.20
Total	14,069		

1966 Danish general election

Parties	Vote		
Parties	Votes	%	+ / -
Venstre	4,557	33.11	-1.12
Social Democrats	4,232	30.75	-1.15
Conservatives	2,578	18.73	-1.08
Social Liberals	1,172	8.52	+1.20
Green Left	554	4.03	+2.29
Independent Party	381	2.77	-0.34
Liberal Centre	177	1.29	New
Justice Party of Denmark	70	0.51	-0.62
Communist Party of Denmark	42	0.31	-0.01
Total	13,763		

1964 Danish general election

Parties	Vote		
Parties	Votes	%	+ / -
Venstre	4,422	34.23	-1.52
Social Democrats	4,122	31.90	+1.72
Conservatives	2,559	19.81	+1.11
Social Liberals	946	7.32	-1.15
Independent Party	402	3.11	-0.34
Green Left	225	1.74	+0.04
Justice Party of Denmark	146	1.13	-0.46
Communist Party of Denmark	41	0.32	+0.15
Peace Politics People's Party	35	0.27	New
Danish Unity	22	0.17	New
Total	12,920		

1960 Danish general election

Parties	Vote		
Parties	Votes	%	+ / -
Venstre	4,510	35.75	-4.02
Social Democrats	3,807	30.18	+2.39
Conservatives	2,359	18.70	+0.53
Social Liberals	1,069	8.47	-0.70
Independent Party	435	3.45	+1.96
Green Left	214	1.70	New
Justice Party of Denmark	200	1.59	-1.57
Communist Party of Denmark	22	0.17	-0.29
Total	12,616		

=== General elections in the 1950s ===
1957 Danish general election

Parties	Vote		
Parties	Votes	%	+ / -
Venstre	5,032	39.77	+0.45
Social Democrats	3,516	27.79	-0.50
Conservatives	2,299	18.17	+0.15
Social Liberals	1,161	9.17	0.00
Justice Party of Denmark	400	3.16	+0.82
Independent Party	188	1.49	-0.44
Communist Party of Denmark	58	0.46	-0.48
Total	12,654		

September 1953 Danish Folketing election

Parties	Vote		
Parties	Votes	%	+ / -
Venstre	4,812	39.32	+31.32
Social Democrats	3,463	28.29	-29.21
Conservatives	2,205	18.02	+13.81
Social Liberals	1,122	9.17	-3.00
Justice Party of Denmark	286	2.34	-13.62
Independent Party	236	1.93	New
Communist Party of Denmark	115	0.94	-0.75
Total	12,239		

April 1953 Danish Folketing election

Parties	Vote		
Parties	Votes	%	+ / -
Social Democrats	15,176	57.50	+30.15
Justice Party of Denmark	4,212	15.96	+10.75
Social Liberals	3,212	12.17	+2.16
Venstre	2,112	8.00	-27.11
Conservatives	1,110	4.21	-16.92
Communist Party of Denmark	445	1.69	+0.49
Danish Unity	127	0.48	New
Total	26,394		

1950 Danish Folketing election

Parties	Vote		
Parties	Votes	%	+ / -
Venstre	4,220	35.11	-4.18
Social Democrats	3,287	27.35	-0.99
Conservatives	2,540	21.13	+3.44
Social Liberals	1,203	10.01	+1.26
Justice Party of Denmark	626	5.21	+2.58
Communist Party of Denmark	144	1.20	-1.22
Total	12,020		

=== General elections in the 1940s ===
1947 Danish Folketing election

Parties	Vote		
Parties	Votes	%	+ / -
Venstre	4,950	39.29	+4.89
Social Democrats	3,570	28.34	+4.65
Conservatives	2,229	17.69	-5.80
Social Liberals	1,103	8.75	-1.38
Justice Party of Denmark	331	2.63	+1.49
Communist Party of Denmark	305	2.42	-2.29
Danish Unity	111	0.88	-1.56
Total	12,599		

1945 Danish Folketing election

Parties	Vote		
Parties	Votes	%	+ / -
Venstre	4,362	34.40	+4.33
Social Democrats	3,004	23.69	-4.27
Conservatives	2,979	23.49	-2.67
Social Liberals	1,285	10.13	-1.32
Communist Party of Denmark	597	4.71	New
Danish Unity	310	2.44	+1.52
Justice Party of Denmark	144	1.14	-0.25
Total	12,681		

1943 Danish Folketing election

Parties	Vote		
Parties	Votes	%	+ / -
Venstre	3,931	30.07	-3.46
Social Democrats	3,655	27.96	+3.00
Conservatives	3,420	26.16	+3.65
Social Liberals	1,497	11.45	-0.64
Justice Party of Denmark	182	1.39	-0.65
National Socialist Workers' Party of Denmark	162	1.24	-0.55
Danish Unity	120	0.92	+0.74
Farmers' Party	107	0.82	-0.86
Total	13,074		

=== General elections in the 1930s ===
1939 Danish Folketing election

Parties	Vote		
Parties	Votes	%	+ / -
Venstre	3,671	33.53	+3.87
Social Democrats	2,733	24.96	-2.00
Conservatives	2,465	22.51	-3.16
Social Liberals	1,324	12.09	-0.33
Justice Party of Denmark	223	2.04	-0.28
National Socialist Workers' Party of Denmark	196	1.79	+0.74
Farmers' Party	184	1.68	+0.05
Communist Party of Denmark	94	0.86	+0.56
National Cooperation	39	0.36	New
Danish Unity	20	0.18	New
Total	10,949		

1935 Danish Folketing election

Parties	Vote		
Parties	Votes	%	+ / -
Venstre	3,317	29.66	-6.54
Social Democrats	3,015	26.96	+6.56
Conservatives	2,870	25.67	-2.18
Social Liberals	1,389	12.42	-1.18
Justice Party of Denmark	259	2.32	+0.54
Independent People's Party	182	1.63	New
National Socialist Workers' Party of Denmark	117	1.05	New
Communist Party of Denmark	33	0.30	+0.13
Total	11,182		

1932 Danish Folketing election

Parties	Vote		
Parties	Votes	%	+ / -
Venstre	4,219	36.20	-0.33
Conservatives	3,246	27.85	+1.81
Social Democrats	2,377	20.40	+0.16
Social Liberals	1,585	13.60	-2.76
Justice Party of Denmark	207	1.78	+0.98
Communist Party of Denmark	20	0.17	+0.13
Total	11,654		

=== General elections in the 1920s ===
1929 Danish Folketing election

Parties	Vote		
Parties	Votes	%	+ / -
Venstre	3,939	36.53	+3.24
Conservatives	2,808	26.04	-8.78
Social Democrats	2,182	20.24	+2.84
Social Liberals	1,764	16.36	+2.19
Justice Party of Denmark	86	0.80	+0.52
Communist Party of Denmark	4	0.04	-0.02
Total	10,783		

1926 Danish Folketing election

Parties	Vote		
Parties	Votes	%	+ / -
Conservatives	3,662	34.82	+1.38
Venstre	3,501	33.29	+0.80
Social Democrats	1,830	17.40	+0.93
Social Liberals	1,490	14.17	-1.70
Justice Party of Denmark	29	0.28	+0.03
Communist Party of Denmark	6	0.06	-0.02
Total	10,518		

1924 Danish Folketing election

Parties	Vote		
Parties	Votes	%	+ / -
Conservatives	3,430	33.44	-0.82
Venstre	3,333	32.49	-5.43
Social Democrats	1,690	16.47	+1.51
Social Liberals	1,628	15.87	+5.13
Farmer Party	143	1.39	New
Justice Party of Denmark	26	0.25	New
Communist Party of Denmark	8	0.08	New
Total	10,258		

September 1920 Danish Folketing election

Parties	Vote		
Parties	Votes	%	+ / -
Venstre	3,756	37.92	-2.95
Conservatives	3,393	34.26	-2.27
Social Democrats	1,482	14.96	+3.07
Social Liberals	1,064	10.74	+2.02
Industry Party	204	2.06	+0.07
Danish Left Socialist Party	6	0.06	New
Total	9,905		

July 1920 Danish Folketing election

Parties	Vote		
Parties	Votes	%	+ / -
Venstre	3,653	40.87	+1.29
Conservatives	3,265	36.53	-1.18
Social Democrats	1,063	11.89	+0.15
Social Liberals	779	8.72	-0.09
Industry Party	178	1.99	-0.17
Total	8,938		

April 1920 Danish Folketing election

Parties	Vote	
Parties	Votes	%
Venstre	3,709	39.58
Conservatives	3,534	37.71
Social Democrats	1,100	11.74
Social Liberals	826	8.81
Industry Party	202	2.16
Total	9,371	

== European Parliament elections results ==
2024 European Parliament election in Denmark

Parties	Vote		
Parties	Votes	%	+ / -
Social Democrats	5,164	20.16	-4.39
Green Left	4,097	16.00	+4.42
Venstre	3,998	15.61	-7.88
Denmark Democrats	2,929	11.44	New
Danish People's Party	1,844	7.20	-4.70
Conservatives	1,825	7.13	-0.02
Moderates	1,490	5.82	New
Liberal Alliance	1,270	4.96	+3.54
Red–Green Alliance	1,259	4.92	-0.08
Social Liberals	1,225	4.78	-3.00
The Alternative	512	2.00	-0.82
Total	25,613		

2019 European Parliament election in Denmark

Parties	Vote		
Parties	Votes	%	+ / -
Social Democrats	7,085	24.55	+5.06
Venstre	6,778	23.49	+8.69
Danish People's Party	3,433	11.90	-13.96
Green Left	3,340	11.58	+2.72
Social Liberals	2,244	7.78	+3.64
Conservatives	2,063	7.15	-10.56
Red–Green Alliance	1,443	5.00	New
People's Movement against the EU	1,244	4.31	-3.17
The Alternative	814	2.82	New
Liberal Alliance	411	1.42	-0.23
Total	28,855		

2014 European Parliament election in Denmark

Parties	Vote		
Parties	Votes	%	+ / -
Danish People's Party	6,519	25.86	+11.79
Social Democrats	4,913	19.49	-3.62
Conservatives	4,464	17.71	-0.43
Venstre	3,731	14.80	-3.97
Green Left	2,234	8.86	-5.44
People's Movement against the EU	1,886	7.48	+1.77
Social Liberals	1,043	4.14	+1.12
Liberal Alliance	415	1.65	+1.19
Total	25,205		

2009 European Parliament election in Denmark

Parties	Vote		
Parties	Votes	%	+ / -
Social Democrats	6,314	23.11	-7.76
Venstre	5,130	18.77	-4.10
Conservatives	4,957	18.14	+4.48
Green Left	3,908	14.30	+7.45
Danish People's Party	3,846	14.07	+7.19
People's Movement against the EU	1,561	5.71	+1.45
Social Liberals	826	3.02	-1.96
June Movement	659	2.41	-6.59
Liberal Alliance	126	0.46	New
Total	27,327		

2004 European Parliament election in Denmark

Parties	Vote		
Parties	Votes	%	+ / -
Social Democrats	5,403	30.87	+4.34
Venstre	4,003	22.87	-2.68
Conservatives	2,391	13.66	+5.85
June Movement	1,576	9.00	-5.21
Danish People's Party	1,204	6.88	+1.91
Green Left	1,199	6.85	+2.24
Social Liberals	872	4.98	-2.32
People's Movement against the EU	745	4.26	-1.15
Christian Democrats	109	0.62	-0.45
Total	17,502		

1999 European Parliament election in Denmark

Parties	Vote		
Parties	Votes	%	+ / -
Social Democrats	5,084	26.53	+5.06
Venstre	4,895	25.55	+1.26
June Movement	2,723	14.21	+1.23
Conservatives	1,496	7.81	-7.69
Social Liberals	1,398	7.30	-0.51
People's Movement against the EU	1,036	5.41	-2.69
Danish People's Party	952	4.97	New
Green Left	884	4.61	-1.47
Centre Democrats	489	2.55	+1.89
Christian Democrats	205	1.07	+0.69
Progress Party	86	0.45	-2.30
Total	19,162		

1994 European Parliament election in Denmark

Parties	Vote		
Parties	Votes	%	+ / -
Venstre	4,876	24.29	+0.27
Social Democrats	4,310	21.47	-5.18
Conservatives	3,111	15.50	+2.66
June Movement	2,605	12.98	New
People's Movement against the EU	1,626	8.10	-3.32
Social Liberals	1,568	7.81	+4.17
Green Left	1,220	6.08	+0.23
Progress Party	552	2.75	-3.27
Centre Democrats	133	0.66	-7.17
Christian Democrats	76	0.38	-1.35
Total	20,077		

1989 European Parliament election in Denmark

Parties	Vote		
Parties	Votes	%	+ / -
Social Democrats	4,656	26.65	+9.55
Venstre	4,197	24.02	+2.17
Conservatives	2,244	12.84	-10.78
People's Movement against the EU	1,995	11.42	-3.45
Centre Democrats	1,369	7.83	+0.57
Progress Party	1,052	6.02	+2.99
Green Left	1,023	5.85	+0.56
Social Liberals	636	3.64	-0.77
Christian Democrats	302	1.73	-0.19
Total	17,474		

1984 European Parliament election in Denmark

Parties	Vote	
Parties	Votes	%
Conservatives	4,558	23.62
Venstre	4,217	21.85
Social Democrats	3,300	17.10
People's Movement against the EU	2,870	14.87
Centre Democrats	1,402	7.26
Green Left	1,021	5.29
Social Liberals	852	4.41
Progress Party	585	3.03
Christian Democrats	370	1.92
Left Socialists	125	0.65
Total	19,300	

== Referendums ==
2022 Danish European Union opt-out referendum

Option	Votes	%
✓ YES	19,811	67.19
X NO	9,675	32.81

2015 Danish European Union opt-out referendum

Option	Votes	%
X NO	17,483	54.35
✓ YES	14,687	45.65

2014 Danish Unified Patent Court membership referendum

Option	Votes	%
✓ YES	15,850	64.57
X NO	8,698	35.43

2009 Danish Act of Succession referendum

Option	Votes	%
✓ YES	22,079	85.41
X NO	3,772	14.59

2000 Danish euro referendum

Option	Votes	%
X NO	17,130	54.69
✓ YES	14,190	45.31

1998 Danish Amsterdam Treaty referendum

Option	Votes	%
✓ YES	15,841	57.37
X NO	11,771	42.63

1993 Danish Maastricht Treaty referendum

Option	Votes	%
✓ YES	18,672	59.65
X NO	12,631	40.35

1992 Danish Maastricht Treaty referendum

Option	Votes	%
✓ YES	15,812	52.99
X NO	14,029	47.01

1986 Danish Single European Act referendum

Option	Votes	%
✓ YES	19,232	69.24
X NO	8,543	30.76

1972 Danish European Communities membership referendum

Option	Votes	%
✓ YES	21,831	74.29
X NO	7,555	25.71

1953 Danish constitutional and electoral age referendum

Option	Votes	%
✓ YES	7,438	88.31
X NO	985	11.69
23 years	5,006	58.67
21 years	3,526	41.33

1939 Danish constitutional referendum

Option	Votes	%
✓ YES	4,747	92.68
X NO	375	7.32
