= Holbæk (nomination district) =

- Holbæk
- Nomination district constituency for the Folketing
- Location of Holbæk within Zealand

- Location of Zealand within Denmark
- Municipalities: Holbæk
- Constituency: Zealand
- Electorate: 54,352 (2022)

Current constituency
- Created: 1849 (as constituency); 1920 (as nomination district)

Holbæk nominating district is one of the 92 nominating districts that exists for Danish elections following the 2007 municipal reform. It consists of Holbæk Municipality. It was created in 1849 as a constituency, and has been a nomination district since 1920, though its boundaries have been changed since then.

In general elections, the district often votes close to the national results when looking at the voter split between the two blocs. However it has trended towards voting more for parties commonly associated with the red bloc, and was one of only two nomination districts where the bloc increased their vote share in the 2022 election.

== General elections results ==
=== General elections in the 2020s ===
2022 Danish general election

Parties	Vote		
Parties	Votes	%	+ / -
Social Democrats	13,954	31.24	+2.19
Green Left	5,239	11.73	+4.48
Venstre	5,230	11.71	-11.96
Moderates	4,876	10.92	New
Denmark Democrats	3,416	7.65	New
Liberal Alliance	2,922	6.54	+4.53
New Right	1,853	4.15	+1.93
Conservatives	1,678	3.76	-2.12
Danish People's Party	1,620	3.63	-6.91
Red–Green Alliance	1,537	3.44	-2.63
Social Liberals	1,043	2.34	-4.14
The Alternative	840	1.88	-0.24
Independent Greens	274	0.61	New
Christian Democrats	117	0.26	-0.60
Lisa Sofia Larsson	34	0.08	New
Rasmus Paludan	32	0.07	New
Total	44,665		

=== General elections in the 2010s ===
2019 Danish general election

Parties	Vote		
Parties	Votes	%	+ / -
Social Democrats	12,772	29.05	+1.09
Venstre	10,408	23.67	+3.76
Danish People's Party	4,632	10.54	-12.82
Green Left	3,189	7.25	+3.93
Social Liberals	2,849	6.48	+2.11
Red–Green Alliance	2,667	6.07	-1.77
Conservatives	2,586	5.88	+2.76
Stram Kurs	1,102	2.51	New
New Right	975	2.22	New
The Alternative	934	2.12	-1.47
Liberal Alliance	884	2.01	-4.08
Klaus Riskær Pedersen Party	540	1.23	New
Christian Democrats	377	0.86	+0.44
Pinki Karin Yvonne Jensen	49	0.11	New
Total	43,964		

2015 Danish general election

Parties	Vote		
Parties	Votes	%	+ / -
Social Democrats	12,173	27.96	+2.08
Danish People's Party	10,167	23.36	+8.90
Venstre	8,666	19.91	-6.44
Red–Green Alliance	3,414	7.84	+1.71
Liberal Alliance	2,650	6.09	+1.82
Social Liberals	1,901	4.37	-4.02
The Alternative	1,563	3.59	New
Green Left	1,447	3.32	-5.88
Conservatives	1,357	3.12	-1.73
Christian Democrats	182	0.42	-0.01
Aamer Ahmad	10	0.02	New
Michael Christiansen	1	0.00	New
Bent A. Jespersen	0	0.00	0.00
Total	43,531		

2011 Danish general election

Parties	Vote		
Parties	Votes	%	+ / -
Venstre	11,657	26.35	-1.10
Social Democrats	11,449	25.88	+0.40
Danish People's Party	6,396	14.46	-0.77
Green Left	4,071	9.20	-3.38
Social Liberals	3,712	8.39	+3.13
Red–Green Alliance	2,713	6.13	+4.33
Conservatives	2,146	4.85	-3.91
Liberal Alliance	1,890	4.27	+1.28
Christian Democrats	191	0.43	-0.03
Johan Isbrandt Haulik	11	0.02	New
Peter Lotinga	6	0.01	New
Bent A. Jespersen	2	0.00	New
Total	44,244		

=== General elections in the 2000s ===
2007 Danish general election

Parties	Vote		
Parties	Votes	%	+ / -
Venstre	11,931	27.45	-2.08
Social Democrats	11,075	25.48	+0.19
Danish People's Party	6,620	15.23	+2.25
Green Left	5,468	12.58	+6.10
Conservatives	3,809	8.76	-0.95
Social Liberals	2,286	5.26	-4.87
New Alliance	1,300	2.99	New
Red–Green Alliance	781	1.80	-1.40
Christian Democrats	202	0.46	-0.70
Total	43,472		

2005 Danish general election

Parties	Vote		
Parties	Votes	%	+ / -
Venstre	10,894	29.53	+1.63
Social Democrats	9,330	25.29	-3.31
Danish People's Party	4,791	12.98	+1.93
Social Liberals	3,736	10.13	+3.81
Conservatives	3,581	9.71	-3.63
Green Left	2,392	6.48	-0.24
Red–Green Alliance	1,181	3.20	+1.03
Centre Democrats	482	1.31	-0.32
Christian Democrats	429	1.16	-0.55
Minority Party	77	0.21	New
Bent A. Jespersen	4	0.01	New
Total	36,897		

2001 Danish general election

Parties	Vote		
Parties	Votes	%	+ / -
Social Democrats	10,681	28.60	-6.95
Venstre	10,422	27.90	+5.96
Conservatives	4,981	13.34	+2.55
Danish People's Party	4,127	11.05	+3.98
Green Left	2,509	6.72	-1.53
Social Liberals	2,361	6.32	+0.39
Red–Green Alliance	809	2.17	-0.36
Christian People's Party	638	1.71	-0.10
Centre Democrats	608	1.63	-2.90
Progress Party	175	0.47	-0.84
Mark Hulstrøm	39	0.10	New
Total	37,350		

=== General elections in the 1990s ===
1998 Danish general election

Parties	Vote		
Parties	Votes	%	+ / -
Social Democrats	12,895	35.55	+1.25
Venstre	7,958	21.94	-0.36
Conservatives	3,914	10.79	-3.74
Green Left	2,994	8.25	+0.02
Danish People's Party	2,564	7.07	New
Social Liberals	2,152	5.93	-1.86
Centre Democrats	1,642	4.53	+1.58
Red–Green Alliance	918	2.53	-0.54
Christian People's Party	656	1.81	+0.45
Progress Party	474	1.31	-4.12
Democratic Renewal	86	0.24	New
Bent A. Jespersen	20	0.06	New
Total	36,273		

1994 Danish general election

Parties	Vote		
Parties	Votes	%	+ / -
Social Democrats	12,047	34.30	-2.58
Venstre	7,832	22.30	+8.56
Conservatives	5,102	14.53	-1.55
Green Left	2,889	8.23	-0.78
Social Liberals	2,736	7.79	+0.09
Progress Party	1,906	5.43	+0.16
Red–Green Alliance	1,080	3.07	+1.53
Centre Democrats	1,037	2.95	-1.96
Christian People's Party	478	1.36	-0.14
Grethe Lindberg	12	0.03	New
Henning Moth	5	0.01	New
Total	35,124		

1990 Danish general election

Parties	Vote		
Parties	Votes	%	+ / -
Social Democrats	12,560	36.88	+8.38
Conservatives	5,476	16.08	-2.81
Venstre	4,678	13.74	+3.93
Green Left	3,067	9.01	-4.74
Social Liberals	2,621	7.70	-2.54
Progress Party	1,794	5.27	-2.86
Centre Democrats	1,671	4.91	+0.85
Common Course	666	1.96	-0.65
Red–Green Alliance	526	1.54	New
Christian People's Party	512	1.50	+0.08
The Greens	301	0.88	-0.50
Justice Party of Denmark	169	0.50	New
Humanist Party	16	0.05	New
Total	34,057		

=== General elections in the 1980s ===
1988 Danish general election

Parties	Vote		
Parties	Votes	%	+ / -
Social Democrats	9,893	28.50	+0.16
Conservatives	6,556	18.89	-1.42
Green Left	4,774	13.75	-1.26
Social Liberals	3,553	10.24	-0.45
Venstre	3,404	9.81	+0.70
Progress Party	2,822	8.13	+4.28
Centre Democrats	1,408	4.06	+0.10
Common Course	907	2.61	-0.41
Christian People's Party	492	1.42	-0.21
The Greens	478	1.38	+0.03
Communist Party of Denmark	221	0.64	-0.12
Left Socialists	190	0.55	-0.58
Søren Barder	16	0.05	New
Total	34,714		

1987 Danish general election

Parties	Vote		
Parties	Votes	%	+ / -
Social Democrats	9,942	28.34	-3.38
Conservatives	7,123	20.31	-3.55
Green Left	5,264	15.01	+3.61
Social Liberals	3,751	10.69	+0.77
Venstre	3,196	9.11	-0.92
Centre Democrats	1,388	3.96	+0.06
Progress Party	1,351	3.85	+0.93
Common Course	1,058	3.02	New
Christian People's Party	573	1.63	-0.49
The Greens	475	1.35	New
Left Socialists	395	1.13	-1.16
Communist Party of Denmark	267	0.76	+0.24
Justice Party of Denmark	159	0.45	-0.79
Humanist Party	97	0.28	New
Socialist Workers Party	27	0.08	+0.04
Marxist–Leninists Party	12	0.03	+0.02
Total	35,078		

1984 Danish general election

Parties	Vote		
Parties	Votes	%	+ / -
Social Democrats	10,822	31.72	-0.57
Conservatives	8,140	23.86	+10.90
Green Left	3,890	11.40	+1.25
Venstre	3,423	10.03	+0.23
Social Liberals	3,384	9.92	-1.46
Centre Democrats	1,332	3.90	-4.67
Progress Party	995	2.92	-5.65
Left Socialists	782	2.29	+0.17
Christian People's Party	722	2.12	+0.36
Justice Party of Denmark	422	1.24	+0.08
Communist Party of Denmark	179	0.52	-0.41
Socialist Workers Party	15	0.04	-0.04
Marxist–Leninists Party	5	0.01	New
Bent E. Jespersen	4	0.01	New
Total	34,115		

1981 Danish general election

Parties	Vote		
Parties	Votes	%	+ / -
Social Democrats	10,157	32.29	-5.51
Conservatives	4,076	12.96	+1.17
Social Liberals	3,580	11.38	+0.28
Green Left	3,194	10.15	+5.30
Venstre	3,084	9.80	-1.89
Centre Democrats	2,696	8.57	+5.43
Progress Party	2,695	8.57	-1.61
Left Socialists	668	2.12	-1.05
Christian People's Party	554	1.76	-0.18
Justice Party of Denmark	365	1.16	-1.08
Communist Party of Denmark	292	0.93	-0.82
Communist Workers Party	53	0.17	-0.18
Socialist Workers Party	25	0.08	New
Kai Linde	17	0.05	New
Total	31,456		

=== General elections in the 1970s ===
1979 Danish general election

Parties	Vote		
Parties	Votes	%	+ / -
Social Democrats	12,100	37.80	+1.01
Conservatives	3,775	11.79	+3.58
Venstre	3,741	11.69	+0.54
Social Liberals	3,554	11.10	+1.73
Progress Party	3,260	10.18	-3.07
Green Left	1,553	4.85	+2.06
Left Socialists	1,015	3.17	+0.84
Centre Democrats	1,006	3.14	-3.34
Justice Party of Denmark	716	2.24	-0.46
Christian People's Party	622	1.94	-1.07
Communist Party of Denmark	559	1.75	-1.31
Communist Workers Party	112	0.35	New
Total	32,013		

1977 Danish general election

Parties	Vote		
Parties	Votes	%	+ / -
Social Democrats	11,310	36.79	+7.28
Progress Party	4,074	13.25	+0.93
Venstre	3,428	11.15	-9.87
Social Liberals	2,880	9.37	-5.90
Conservatives	2,525	8.21	+3.46
Centre Democrats	1,993	6.48	+4.28
Communist Party of Denmark	942	3.06	-0.17
Christian People's Party	926	3.01	-1.83
Green Left	858	2.79	-0.97
Justice Party of Denmark	831	2.70	+1.23
Left Socialists	715	2.33	+0.71
Pensioners' Party	264	0.86	New
Total	30,746		

1975 Danish general election

Parties	Vote		
Parties	Votes	%	+ / -
Social Democrats	8,739	29.51	+5.04
Venstre	6,226	21.02	+8.40
Social Liberals	4,521	15.27	-2.70
Progress Party	3,649	12.32	-2.49
Christian People's Party	1,433	4.84	+1.57
Conservatives	1,407	4.75	-2.96
Green Left	1,113	3.76	-0.68
Communist Party of Denmark	958	3.23	+0.47
Centre Democrats	652	2.20	-6.10
Left Socialists	480	1.62	+0.37
Justice Party of Denmark	435	1.47	-0.92
N. Vestergård Eriksen	2	0.01	New
Egon Larsen	1	0.00	New
Total	29,616		

1973 Danish general election

Parties	Vote		
Parties	Votes	%	+ / -
Social Democrats	7,192	24.47	-11.56
Social Liberals	5,283	17.97	-4.33
Progress Party	4,353	14.81	New
Venstre	3,711	12.62	-3.78
Centre Democrats	2,441	8.30	New
Conservatives	2,266	7.71	-5.54
Green Left	1,305	4.44	-2.32
Christian People's Party	962	3.27	+1.58
Communist Party of Denmark	812	2.76	+1.73
Justice Party of Denmark	703	2.39	+1.20
Left Socialists	367	1.25	-0.10
Total	29,395		

1971 Danish general election

Parties	Vote		
Parties	Votes	%	+ / -
Social Democrats	9,833	36.03	+3.47
Social Liberals	6,084	22.30	-2.11
Venstre	4,475	16.40	-2.39
Conservatives	3,617	13.25	-2.25
Green Left	1,845	6.76	+2.85
Christian People's Party	460	1.69	New
Left Socialists	369	1.35	-0.34
Justice Party of Denmark	324	1.19	+0.61
Communist Party of Denmark	281	1.03	+0.04
Total	27,288		

=== General elections in the 1960s ===
1968 Danish general election

Parties	Vote		
Parties	Votes	%	+ / -
Social Democrats	7,068	32.56	-5.02
Social Liberals	5,298	24.41	+8.08
Venstre	4,078	18.79	-1.42
Conservatives	3,365	15.50	+1.43
Green Left	849	3.91	-3.29
Left Socialists	366	1.69	New
Liberal Centre	248	1.14	-0.90
Communist Party of Denmark	215	0.99	+0.23
Justice Party of Denmark	125	0.58	-0.04
Independent Party	95	0.44	-0.75
Total	21,707		

1966 Danish general election

Parties	Vote		
Parties	Votes	%	+ / -
Social Democrats	7,968	37.58	-1.97
Venstre	4,284	20.21	-1.76
Social Liberals	3,462	16.33	+1.32
Conservatives	2,982	14.07	-1.11
Green Left	1,526	7.20	+3.89
Liberal Centre	433	2.04	New
Independent Party	252	1.19	-0.60
Communist Party of Denmark	162	0.76	-0.40
Justice Party of Denmark	131	0.62	-0.65
Total	21,200		

1964 Danish general election

Parties	Vote		
Parties	Votes	%	+ / -
Social Democrats	7,797	39.55	+2.32
Venstre	4,332	21.97	-1.60
Conservatives	2,993	15.18	+2.87
Social Liberals	2,960	15.01	-3.20
Green Left	653	3.31	-0.49
Independent Party	353	1.79	-0.09
Justice Party of Denmark	250	1.27	-0.84
Communist Party of Denmark	228	1.16	+0.27
Peace Politics People's Party	88	0.45	New
Danish Unity	62	0.31	New
Total	19,716		

1960 Danish general election

Parties	Vote		
Parties	Votes	%	+ / -
Social Democrats	6,902	37.23	+3.52
Venstre	4,369	23.57	-3.57
Social Liberals	3,377	18.21	-4.38
Conservatives	2,282	12.31	+1.42
Green Left	704	3.80	New
Justice Party of Denmark	392	2.11	-0.88
Independent Party	349	1.88	+1.20
Communist Party of Denmark	165	0.89	-1.11
Total	18,540		

=== General elections in the 1950s ===
1957 Danish general election

Parties	Vote		
Parties	Votes	%	+ / -
Social Democrats	6,049	33.71	-2.20
Venstre	4,869	27.14	+1.65
Social Liberals	4,054	22.59	-0.15
Conservatives	1,954	10.89	+0.79
Justice Party of Denmark	536	2.99	+0.49
Communist Party of Denmark	359	2.00	-0.45
Independent Party	122	0.68	-0.13
Total	17,943		

September 1953 Danish Folketing election

Parties	Vote		
Parties	Votes	%	+ / -
Social Democrats	6,268	35.91	+2.33
Venstre	4,449	25.49	+1.26
Social Liberals	3,968	22.74	-2.12
Conservatives	1,763	10.10	+0.17
Justice Party of Denmark	437	2.50	-1.10
Communist Party of Denmark	427	2.45	-0.39
Independent Party	141	0.81	New
Total	17,453		

April 1953 Danish Folketing election

Parties	Vote		
Parties	Votes	%	+ / -
Social Democrats	5,659	33.58	-1.09
Social Liberals	4,190	24.86	-0.33
Venstre	4,084	24.23	+2.01
Conservatives	1,674	9.93	-0.97
Justice Party of Denmark	607	3.60	-0.89
Communist Party of Denmark	479	2.84	+0.31
Danish Unity	161	0.96	New
Total	16,854		

1950 Danish Folketing election

Parties	Vote		
Parties	Votes	%	+ / -
Social Democrats	5,787	34.67	-1.47
Social Liberals	4,205	25.19	+3.20
Venstre	3,710	22.22	-4.50
Conservatives	1,819	10.90	+3.79
Justice Party of Denmark	750	4.49	+1.75
Communist Party of Denmark	422	2.53	-1.48
Total	16,693		

=== General elections in the 1940s ===
1947 Danish Folketing election

Parties	Vote		
Parties	Votes	%	+ / -
Social Democrats	6,111	36.14	+6.09
Venstre	4,518	26.72	+3.46
Social Liberals	3,718	21.99	-0.94
Conservatives	1,202	7.11	-3.98
Communist Party of Denmark	678	4.01	-4.12
Justice Party of Denmark	464	2.74	+1.05
Danish Unity	218	1.29	-1.55
Total	16,909		

1945 Danish Folketing election

Parties	Vote		
Parties	Votes	%	+ / -
Social Democrats	5,039	30.05	-6.65
Venstre	3,900	23.26	+2.55
Social Liberals	3,845	22.93	-1.99
Conservatives	1,860	11.09	-1.90
Communist Party of Denmark	1,364	8.13	New
Danish Unity	477	2.84	+1.37
Justice Party of Denmark	284	1.69	-0.20
Total	16,769		

1943 Danish Folketing election

Parties	Vote		
Parties	Votes	%	+ / -
Social Democrats	6,013	36.70	+4.46
Social Liberals	4,084	24.92	-1.00
Venstre	3,393	20.71	+0.06
Conservatives	2,129	12.99	+1.07
Justice Party of Denmark	310	1.89	-1.58
Danish Unity	241	1.47	+1.12
National Socialist Workers' Party of Denmark	168	1.03	-0.81
Farmers' Party	48	0.29	-0.41
Total	16,386		

=== General elections in the 1930s ===
1939 Danish Folketing election

Parties	Vote		
Parties	Votes	%	+ / -
Social Democrats	4,699	32.24	-4.33
Social Liberals	3,778	25.92	+1.64
Venstre	3,010	20.65	+1.19
Conservatives	1,737	11.92	-0.07
Justice Party of Denmark	506	3.47	-1.25
Communist Party of Denmark	398	2.73	+1.66
National Socialist Workers' Party of Denmark	268	1.84	+1.08
Farmers' Party	102	0.70	-0.46
Danish Unity	51	0.35	New
National Cooperation	26	0.18	New
Total	14,575		

1935 Danish Folketing election

Parties	Vote		
Parties	Votes	%	+ / -
Social Democrats	5,279	36.57	+3.07
Social Liberals	3,505	24.28	-1.87
Venstre	2,809	19.46	-5.14
Conservatives	1,731	11.99	-0.02
Justice Party of Denmark	682	4.72	+1.46
Independent People's Party	168	1.16	New
Communist Party of Denmark	154	1.07	+0.59
National Socialist Workers' Party of Denmark	109	0.76	New
Total	14,437		

1932 Danish Folketing election

Parties	Vote		
Parties	Votes	%	+ / -
Social Democrats	4,724	33.50	+1.28
Social Liberals	3,688	26.15	-1.68
Venstre	3,469	24.60	-3.72
Conservatives	1,694	12.01	+2.55
Justice Party of Denmark	459	3.26	+1.42
Communist Party of Denmark	67	0.48	+0.15
Total	14,101		

=== General elections in the 1920s ===
1929 Danish Folketing election

Parties	Vote		
Parties	Votes	%	+ / -
Social Democrats	4,342	32.22	+3.33
Venstre	3,816	28.32	-1.80
Social Liberals	3,750	27.83	-0.14
Conservatives	1,275	9.46	-2.64
Justice Party of Denmark	248	1.84	+0.92
Communist Party of Denmark	44	0.33	New
Total	13,475		

1926 Danish Folketing election

Parties	Vote		
Parties	Votes	%	+ / -
Venstre	3,768	30.12	+9.92
Social Democrats	3,614	28.89	+10.18
Social Liberals	3,499	27.97	-23.12
Conservatives	1,514	12.10	+3.65
Justice Party of Denmark	115	0.92	+0.08
Total	12,510		

1924 Danish Folketing election

Parties	Vote		
Parties	Votes	%	+ / -
Social Liberals	8,849	51.09	+20.75
Venstre	3,498	20.20	-12.83
Social Democrats	3,240	18.71	-5.31
Conservatives	1,464	8.45	-3.77
Justice Party of Denmark	145	0.84	New
Farmer Party	75	0.43	New
Communist Party of Denmark	48	0.28	New
Total	17,319		

September 1920 Danish Folketing election

Parties	Vote		
Parties	Votes	%	+ / -
Venstre	3,940	33.03	-2.40
Social Liberals	3,619	30.34	+1.81
Social Democrats	2,865	24.02	+1.02
Conservatives	1,458	12.22	-0.26
Industry Party	48	0.40	-0.17
Total	11,930		

July 1920 Danish Folketing election

Parties	Vote		
Parties	Votes	%	+ / -
Venstre	3,537	35.43	+0.02
Social Liberals	2,848	28.53	-2.89
Social Democrats	2,296	23.00	+2.20
Conservatives	1,246	12.48	+0.67
Industry Party	57	0.57	+0.02
Total	9,984		

April 1920 Danish Folketing election

Parties	Vote	
Parties	Votes	%
Venstre	3,621	35.41
Social Liberals	3,213	31.42
Social Democrats	2,127	20.80
Conservatives	1,208	11.81
Industry Party	56	0.55
Total	10,225	

== European Parliament elections results ==
2024 European Parliament election in Denmark

Parties	Vote		
Parties	Votes	%	+ / -
Social Democrats	5,275	17.84	-5.58
Green Left	5,266	17.80	+5.93
Venstre	4,342	14.68	-7.79
Danish People's Party	2,359	7.98	-5.17
Denmark Democrats	2,320	7.84	New
Conservatives	2,136	7.22	+2.23
Moderates	1,966	6.65	New
Liberal Alliance	1,827	6.18	+4.20
Red–Green Alliance	1,779	6.02	+0.08
Social Liberals	1,749	5.91	-3.03
The Alternative	557	1.88	-0.80
Total	29,576		

2019 European Parliament election in Denmark

Parties	Vote		
Parties	Votes	%	+ / -
Social Democrats	7,815	23.42	+5.16
Venstre	7,496	22.47	+4.73
Danish People's Party	4,387	13.15	-15.89
Green Left	3,959	11.87	+1.73
Social Liberals	2,982	8.94	+2.68
Red–Green Alliance	1,981	5.94	New
Conservatives	1,664	4.99	-1.93
People's Movement against the EU	1,525	4.57	-4.67
The Alternative	894	2.68	New
Liberal Alliance	660	1.98	-0.43
Total	33,363		

2014 European Parliament election in Denmark

Parties	Vote		
Parties	Votes	%	+ / -
Danish People's Party	7,898	29.04	+12.41
Social Democrats	4,966	18.26	-1.81
Venstre	4,824	17.74	-2.43
Green Left	2,759	10.14	-6.91
People's Movement against the EU	2,512	9.24	+1.95
Conservatives	1,881	6.92	-4.57
Social Liberals	1,703	6.26	+1.71
Liberal Alliance	656	2.41	+1.99
Total	27,199		

2009 European Parliament election in Denmark

Parties	Vote		
Parties	Votes	%	+ / -
Venstre	5,836	20.17	+2.73
Social Democrats	5,808	20.07	-11.43
Green Left	4,933	17.05	+8.17
Danish People's Party	4,812	16.63	+9.81
Conservatives	3,326	11.49	+0.80
People's Movement against the EU	2,110	7.29	+2.74
Social Liberals	1,317	4.55	-4.61
June Movement	676	2.34	-7.91
Liberal Alliance	122	0.42	New
Total	28,940		

2004 European Parliament election in Denmark

Parties	Vote		
Parties	Votes	%	+ / -
Social Democrats	6,342	31.50	+15.12
Venstre	3,511	17.44	-2.31
Conservatives	2,153	10.69	+0.54
June Movement	2,064	10.25	-7.19
Social Liberals	1,844	9.16	-1.70
Green Left	1,787	8.88	+1.81
Danish People's Party	1,374	6.82	+1.61
People's Movement against the EU	916	4.55	-3.41
Christian Democrats	143	0.71	-0.80
Total	20,134		

1999 European Parliament election in Denmark

Parties	Vote		
Parties	Votes	%	+ / -
Venstre	4,105	19.75	+2.56
June Movement	3,625	17.44	+0.91
Social Democrats	3,406	16.38	+2.21
Social Liberals	2,258	10.86	-2.55
Conservatives	2,110	10.15	-6.76
People's Movement against the EU	1,655	7.96	-2.12
Green Left	1,470	7.07	-1.08
Danish People's Party	1,084	5.21	New
Centre Democrats	763	3.67	+2.80
Christian Democrats	314	1.51	+0.83
Progress Party	104	0.50	-1.51
Total	20,790		

1994 European Parliament election in Denmark

Parties	Vote		
Parties	Votes	%	+ / -
Venstre	3,812	17.19	+1.09
Conservatives	3,750	16.91	+4.44
June Movement	3,665	16.53	New
Social Democrats	3,141	14.17	-8.35
Social Liberals	2,973	13.41	+7.67
People's Movement against the EU	2,235	10.08	-9.16
Green Left	1,806	8.15	-1.02
Progress Party	446	2.01	-2.66
Centre Democrats	193	0.87	-7.40
Christian Democrats	151	0.68	-1.14
Total	22,172		

1989 European Parliament election in Denmark

Parties	Vote		
Parties	Votes	%	+ / -
Social Democrats	4,171	22.52	+3.34
People's Movement against the EU	3,564	19.24	-2.10
Venstre	2,982	16.10	+3.37
Conservatives	2,309	12.47	-6.14
Green Left	1,699	9.17	+0.23
Centre Democrats	1,531	8.27	+1.48
Social Liberals	1,063	5.74	-0.35
Progress Party	865	4.67	+1.54
Christian Democrats	338	1.82	-0.29
Total	18,522		

1984 European Parliament election in Denmark

Parties	Vote	
Parties	Votes	%
People's Movement against the EU	4,191	21.34
Social Democrats	3,766	19.18
Conservatives	3,654	18.61
Venstre	2,500	12.73
Green Left	1,755	8.94
Centre Democrats	1,333	6.79
Social Liberals	1,196	6.09
Progress Party	615	3.13
Christian Democrats	414	2.11
Left Socialists	211	1.07
Total	19,635	

== Referendums ==
2022 Danish European Union opt-out referendum

Option	Votes	%
✓ YES	22,771	64.19
X NO	12,704	35.81

2015 Danish European Union opt-out referendum

Option	Votes	%
X NO	20,724	56.70
✓ YES	15,825	43.30

2014 Danish Unified Patent Court membership referendum

Option	Votes	%
✓ YES	16,456	64.09
X NO	9,219	35.91

2009 Danish Act of Succession referendum

Option	Votes	%
✓ YES	23,426	85.37
X NO	4,014	14.63

2000 Danish euro referendum

Option	Votes	%
X NO	21,433	56.92
✓ YES	16,221	43.08

1998 Danish Amsterdam Treaty referendum

Option	Votes	%
✓ YES	16,944	52.43
X NO	15,372	47.57

1993 Danish Maastricht Treaty referendum

Option	Votes	%
✓ YES	19,855	55.08
X NO	16,194	44.92

1992 Danish Maastricht Treaty referendum

Option	Votes	%
X NO	18,093	52.03
✓ YES	16,681	47.97

1986 Danish Single European Act referendum

Option	Votes	%
✓ YES	16,867	56.16
X NO	13,169	43.84

1972 Danish European Communities membership referendum

Option	Votes	%
✓ YES	18,538	63.58
X NO	10,617	36.42

1953 Danish constitutional and electoral age referendum

Option	Votes	%
✓ YES	12,335	88.42
X NO	1,616	11.58
21 years	7,510	52.16
23 years	6,889	47.84

1939 Danish constitutional referendum

Option	Votes	%
✓ YES	9,825	93.54
X NO	679	6.46
