= Næstved (nomination district) =

- Næstved
- Nomination district constituency for the Folketing
- Location of Næstved within Zealand

- Location of Zealand within Denmark
- Municipalities: Næstved
- Constituency: Zealand
- Electorate: 63,780 (2022)

Current constituency
- Created: 1849 (as constituency); 1920 (as nomination district)

Næstved nominating district is one of the 92 nominating districts that exists for Danish elections following the 2007 municipal reform. It consists of Næstved Municipality. It was created in 1849 as a constituency, and has been a nomination district since 1920, though its boundaries have been changed since then.

In general elections, the district tends to vote close to the national result when looking at the voter split between the two blocs.

== General elections results ==
=== General elections in the 2020s ===
2022 Danish general election

Parties	Vote		
Parties	Votes	%	+ / -
Social Democrats	17,084	32.81	-0.87
Venstre	5,668	10.89	-11.91
Moderates	5,584	10.73	New
Green Left	4,494	8.63	+0.52
Denmark Democrats	4,264	8.19	New
Liberal Alliance	3,637	6.99	+5.14
Conservatives	2,781	5.34	-0.16
New Right	2,568	4.93	+2.31
Danish People's Party	2,205	4.24	-5.78
Red–Green Alliance	1,502	2.88	-1.71
Social Liberals	1,104	2.12	-2.54
The Alternative	829	1.59	-0.15
Independent Greens	139	0.27	New
Christian Democrats	124	0.24	-0.52
Rasmus Paludan	42	0.08	New
Lisa Sofia Larsson	40	0.08	New
Total	52,065		

=== General elections in the 2010s ===
2019 Danish general election

Parties	Vote		
Parties	Votes	%	+ / -
Social Democrats	17,409	33.68	+0.82
Venstre	11,787	22.80	+4.96
Danish People's Party	5,179	10.02	-14.61
Green Left	4,192	8.11	+4.89
Conservatives	2,841	5.50	+2.59
Social Liberals	2,411	4.66	+2.42
Red–Green Alliance	2,372	4.59	-1.66
Stram Kurs	1,380	2.67	New
New Right	1,355	2.62	New
Liberal Alliance	956	1.85	-4.71
The Alternative	900	1.74	-1.26
Klaus Riskær Pedersen Party	507	0.98	New
Christian Democrats	394	0.76	+0.31
Pinki Karin Yvonne Jensen	7	0.01	New
Total	51,690		

2015 Danish general election

Parties	Vote		
Parties	Votes	%	+ / -
Social Democrats	17,230	32.86	+4.02
Danish People's Party	12,914	24.63	+9.29
Venstre	9,357	17.84	-6.92
Liberal Alliance	3,438	6.56	+2.23
Red–Green Alliance	3,278	6.25	+1.01
Green Left	1,690	3.22	-5.70
The Alternative	1,573	3.00	New
Conservatives	1,526	2.91	-2.39
Social Liberals	1,175	2.24	-4.48
Christian Democrats	235	0.45	-0.05
Aamer Ahmad	10	0.02	New
Michael Christiansen	8	0.02	New
Bent A. Jespersen	1	0.00	-0.01
Total	52,435		

2011 Danish general election

Parties	Vote		
Parties	Votes	%	+ / -
Social Democrats	15,208	28.84	-0.55
Venstre	13,059	24.76	-0.97
Danish People's Party	8,092	15.34	-0.57
Green Left	4,706	8.92	-2.60
Social Liberals	3,546	6.72	+3.29
Conservatives	2,797	5.30	-4.49
Red–Green Alliance	2,763	5.24	+3.95
Liberal Alliance	2,282	4.33	+1.81
Christian Democrats	264	0.50	+0.06
Johan Isbrandt Haulik	14	0.03	New
Peter Lotinga	6	0.01	New
Bent A. Jespersen	3	0.01	New
Total	52,740		

=== General elections in the 2000s ===
2007 Danish general election

Parties	Vote		
Parties	Votes	%	+ / -
Social Democrats	15,339	29.39	-1.10
Venstre	13,430	25.73	-0.44
Danish People's Party	8,305	15.91	+2.17
Green Left	6,012	11.52	+6.17
Conservatives	5,110	9.79	-2.81
Social Liberals	1,788	3.43	-3.39
New Alliance	1,313	2.52	New
Red–Green Alliance	674	1.29	-1.20
Christian Democrats	229	0.44	-0.63
Total	52,200		

2005 Danish general election

Parties	Vote		
Parties	Votes	%	+ / -
Social Democrats	12,413	30.49	-3.05
Venstre	10,656	26.17	-0.69
Danish People's Party	5,593	13.74	+2.66
Conservatives	5,128	12.59	-1.00
Social Liberals	2,778	6.82	+3.35
Green Left	2,179	5.35	-0.62
Red–Green Alliance	1,015	2.49	+0.80
Centre Democrats	437	1.07	-0.42
Christian Democrats	434	1.07	-0.77
Minority Party	78	0.19	New
Jens Paul Wojczak Pihl	5	0.01	New
Total	40,716		

2001 Danish general election

Parties	Vote		
Parties	Votes	%	+ / -
Social Democrats	13,823	33.54	-6.79
Venstre	11,072	26.86	+7.93
Conservatives	5,602	13.59	-0.91
Danish People's Party	4,566	11.08	+4.71
Green Left	2,462	5.97	-1.04
Social Liberals	1,431	3.47	+0.68
Christian People's Party	759	1.84	-0.51
Red–Green Alliance	698	1.69	-0.24
Centre Democrats	616	1.49	-2.66
Progress Party	186	0.45	-0.93
Total	41,215		

=== General elections in the 1990s ===
1998 Danish general election

Parties	Vote		
Parties	Votes	%	+ / -
Social Democrats	16,258	40.33	-0.22
Venstre	7,630	18.93	-0.35
Conservatives	5,846	14.50	-4.23
Green Left	2,826	7.01	+0.88
Danish People's Party	2,568	6.37	New
Centre Democrats	1,671	4.15	+1.23
Social Liberals	1,124	2.79	-0.87
Christian People's Party	949	2.35	+0.93
Red–Green Alliance	780	1.93	-0.80
Progress Party	555	1.38	-3.21
Democratic Renewal	95	0.24	New
Bjarne S. Landsfeldt	9	0.02	New
Total	40,311		

1994 Danish general election

Parties	Vote		
Parties	Votes	%	+ / -
Social Democrats	15,967	40.55	-3.28
Venstre	7,591	19.28	+7.26
Conservatives	7,375	18.73	+1.48
Green Left	2,413	6.13	-1.56
Progress Party	1,807	4.59	+0.02
Social Liberals	1,443	3.66	+0.89
Centre Democrats	1,149	2.92	-3.00
Red–Green Alliance	1,074	2.73	+1.54
Christian People's Party	559	1.42	-0.59
Total	39,378		

1990 Danish general election

Parties	Vote		
Parties	Votes	%	+ / -
Social Democrats	16,811	43.83	+9.22
Conservatives	6,615	17.25	-3.83
Venstre	4,612	12.02	+3.93
Green Left	2,948	7.69	-5.28
Centre Democrats	2,269	5.92	+0.89
Progress Party	1,753	4.57	-3.25
Social Liberals	1,062	2.77	-2.12
Christian People's Party	770	2.01	+0.62
Common Course	614	1.60	-0.33
Red–Green Alliance	455	1.19	New
The Greens	276	0.72	-0.46
Justice Party of Denmark	154	0.40	New
Humanist Party	15	0.04	New
Total	38,354		

=== General elections in the 1980s ===
1988 Danish general election

Parties	Vote		
Parties	Votes	%	+ / -
Social Democrats	13,587	34.61	+0.37
Conservatives	8,275	21.08	-1.87
Green Left	5,092	12.97	-1.18
Venstre	3,176	8.09	+0.55
Progress Party	3,069	7.82	+3.96
Centre Democrats	1,973	5.03	+0.30
Social Liberals	1,920	4.89	-0.52
Common Course	758	1.93	-0.13
Christian People's Party	546	1.39	-0.29
The Greens	465	1.18	+0.09
Communist Party of Denmark	243	0.62	-0.05
Left Socialists	158	0.40	-0.49
Total	39,262		

1987 Danish general election

Parties	Vote		
Parties	Votes	%	+ / -
Social Democrats	13,546	34.24	-2.91
Conservatives	9,079	22.95	-1.43
Green Left	5,596	14.15	+3.48
Venstre	2,981	7.54	-2.48
Social Liberals	2,139	5.41	+0.11
Centre Democrats	1,870	4.73	+0.37
Progress Party	1,525	3.86	+1.07
Common Course	816	2.06	New
Christian People's Party	665	1.68	-0.30
The Greens	433	1.09	New
Left Socialists	353	0.89	-0.64
Communist Party of Denmark	267	0.67	+0.18
Justice Party of Denmark	175	0.44	-0.79
Humanist Party	59	0.15	New
Socialist Workers Party	47	0.12	+0.03
Marxist–Leninists Party	6	0.02	0.00
Total	39,557		

1984 Danish general election

Parties	Vote		
Parties	Votes	%	+ / -
Social Democrats	14,536	37.15	-1.20
Conservatives	9,537	24.38	+9.83
Green Left	4,174	10.67	-0.16
Venstre	3,921	10.02	+0.44
Social Liberals	2,073	5.30	+0.14
Centre Democrats	1,705	4.36	-4.42
Progress Party	1,092	2.79	-5.02
Christian People's Party	774	1.98	+0.30
Left Socialists	600	1.53	+0.22
Justice Party of Denmark	480	1.23	+0.18
Communist Party of Denmark	190	0.49	-0.27
Socialist Workers Party	35	0.09	+0.03
Marxist–Leninists Party	9	0.02	New
Total	39,126		

1981 Danish general election

Parties	Vote		
Parties	Votes	%	+ / -
Social Democrats	13,869	38.35	-6.12
Conservatives	5,262	14.55	+2.36
Green Left	3,915	10.83	+5.52
Venstre	3,466	9.58	-2.40
Centre Democrats	3,174	8.78	+5.34
Progress Party	2,824	7.81	-1.50
Social Liberals	1,867	5.16	-0.15
Christian People's Party	607	1.68	-0.15
Left Socialists	474	1.31	-1.03
Justice Party of Denmark	381	1.05	-1.01
Communist Party of Denmark	275	0.76	-0.60
Communist Workers Party	24	0.07	-0.32
Socialist Workers Party	23	0.06	New
Total	36,161		

=== General elections in the 1970s ===
1979 Danish general election

Parties	Vote		
Parties	Votes	%	+ / -
Social Democrats	16,000	44.47	+1.22
Conservatives	4,387	12.19	+4.44
Venstre	4,310	11.98	+0.29
Progress Party	3,348	9.31	-3.58
Social Liberals	1,910	5.31	+1.68
Green Left	1,909	5.31	+2.31
Centre Democrats	1,238	3.44	-3.48
Left Socialists	843	2.34	+0.83
Justice Party of Denmark	742	2.06	-0.65
Christian People's Party	659	1.83	-0.97
Communist Party of Denmark	488	1.36	-1.39
Communist Workers Party	142	0.39	New
Total	35,976		

1977 Danish general election

Parties	Vote		
Parties	Votes	%	+ / -
Social Democrats	15,072	43.25	+6.38
Progress Party	4,490	12.89	+1.17
Venstre	4,075	11.69	-12.99
Conservatives	2,700	7.75	+3.25
Centre Democrats	2,411	6.92	+4.80
Social Liberals	1,265	3.63	-3.53
Green Left	1,044	3.00	-0.61
Christian People's Party	974	2.80	-1.48
Communist Party of Denmark	957	2.75	-0.04
Justice Party of Denmark	946	2.71	+1.47
Left Socialists	527	1.51	+0.48
Pensioners' Party	384	1.10	New
Total	34,845		

1975 Danish general election

Parties	Vote		
Parties	Votes	%	+ / -
Social Democrats	12,360	36.87	+6.26
Venstre	8,274	24.68	+12.26
Progress Party	3,927	11.72	-3.14
Social Liberals	2,400	7.16	-4.97
Conservatives	1,507	4.50	-3.26
Christian People's Party	1,434	4.28	+1.38
Green Left	1,210	3.61	-0.64
Communist Party of Denmark	935	2.79	+0.79
Centre Democrats	710	2.12	-7.82
Justice Party of Denmark	415	1.24	-0.88
Left Socialists	346	1.03	+0.04
Freddy Hertz	2	0.01	New
Total	33,520		

1973 Danish general election

Parties	Vote		
Parties	Votes	%	+ / -
Social Democrats	10,259	30.61	-15.39
Progress Party	4,981	14.86	New
Venstre	4,164	12.42	-3.17
Social Liberals	4,067	12.13	-1.90
Centre Democrats	3,331	9.94	New
Conservatives	2,602	7.76	-6.57
Green Left	1,425	4.25	-1.90
Christian People's Party	973	2.90	+1.74
Justice Party of Denmark	711	2.12	+0.84
Communist Party of Denmark	672	2.00	+1.30
Left Socialists	332	0.99	+0.22
Total	33,517		

1971 Danish general election

Parties	Vote		
Parties	Votes	%	+ / -
Social Democrats	14,414	46.00	+1.57
Venstre	4,884	15.59	-1.86
Conservatives	4,489	14.33	-1.71
Social Liberals	4,397	14.03	+0.20
Green Left	1,928	6.15	+1.43
Justice Party of Denmark	401	1.28	+0.69
Christian People's Party	363	1.16	New
Left Socialists	240	0.77	-0.35
Communist Party of Denmark	219	0.70	+0.21
Total	31,335		

=== General elections in the 1960s ===
1968 Danish general election

Parties	Vote		
Parties	Votes	%	+ / -
Social Democrats	9,869	44.43	-4.20
Venstre	3,875	17.45	-1.63
Conservatives	3,563	16.04	+2.07
Social Liberals	3,073	13.83	+6.89
Green Left	1,049	4.72	-2.84
Left Socialists	248	1.12	New
Liberal Centre	233	1.05	-1.04
Justice Party of Denmark	130	0.59	+0.08
Communist Party of Denmark	109	0.49	+0.11
Independent Party	63	0.28	-0.56
Total	22,212		

1966 Danish general election

Parties	Vote		
Parties	Votes	%	+ / -
Social Democrats	10,490	48.63	-3.65
Venstre	4,116	19.08	-1.27
Conservatives	3,013	13.97	-1.52
Green Left	1,631	7.56	+4.09
Social Liberals	1,498	6.94	+1.58
Liberal Centre	451	2.09	New
Independent Party	182	0.84	-0.62
Justice Party of Denmark	110	0.51	-0.20
Communist Party of Denmark	82	0.38	-0.17
Total	21,573		

1964 Danish general election

Parties	Vote		
Parties	Votes	%	+ / -
Social Democrats	10,555	52.28	+1.80
Venstre	4,108	20.35	-2.72
Conservatives	3,127	15.49	+1.97
Social Liberals	1,083	5.36	-0.27
Green Left	700	3.47	-0.28
Independent Party	295	1.46	-0.22
Justice Party of Denmark	144	0.71	-0.69
Communist Party of Denmark	112	0.55	+0.08
Danish Unity	66	0.33	New
Total	20,190		

1960 Danish general election

Parties	Vote		
Parties	Votes	%	+ / -
Social Democrats	9,759	50.48	+11.26
Venstre	4,460	23.07	-8.20
Conservatives	2,614	13.52	+1.47
Social Liberals	1,088	5.63	-4.32
Green Left	725	3.75	New
Independent Party	324	1.68	+0.73
Justice Party of Denmark	270	1.40	-3.94
Communist Party of Denmark	91	0.47	-0.75
Total	19,331		

=== General elections in the 1950s ===
1957 Danish general election

Parties	Vote		
Parties	Votes	%	+ / -
Social Democrats	5,641	39.22	-1.51
Venstre	4,498	31.27	+3.90
Conservatives	1,733	12.05	+0.79
Social Liberals	1,431	9.95	-1.41
Justice Party of Denmark	768	5.34	-0.64
Communist Party of Denmark	176	1.22	-0.57
Independent Party	137	0.95	-0.57
Total	14,384		

September 1953 Danish Folketing election

Parties	Vote		
Parties	Votes	%	+ / -
Social Democrats	5,738	40.73	+1.41
Venstre	3,856	27.37	+1.80
Social Liberals	1,601	11.36	+0.09
Conservatives	1,586	11.26	-0.95
Justice Party of Denmark	842	5.98	-3.02
Communist Party of Denmark	252	1.79	-0.25
Independent Party	214	1.52	New
Total	14,089		

April 1953 Danish Folketing election

Parties	Vote		
Parties	Votes	%	+ / -
Social Democrats	5,345	39.32	-9.08
Venstre	3,476	25.57	+4.29
Conservatives	1,660	12.21	-2.86
Social Liberals	1,532	11.27	+2.38
Justice Party of Denmark	1,224	9.00	+5.25
Communist Party of Denmark	278	2.04	-0.57
Danish Unity	80	0.59	New
Total	13,595		

1950 Danish Folketing election

Parties	Vote		
Parties	Votes	%	+ / -
Social Democrats	8,102	48.40	-0.63
Venstre	3,562	21.28	-6.66
Conservatives	2,523	15.07	+5.97
Social Liberals	1,488	8.89	+0.94
Justice Party of Denmark	628	3.75	+2.06
Communist Party of Denmark	437	2.61	-1.11
Total	16,740		

=== General elections in the 1940s ===
1947 Danish Folketing election

Parties	Vote		
Parties	Votes	%	+ / -
Social Democrats	8,213	49.03	+13.09
Venstre	4,680	27.94	+2.64
Conservatives	1,524	9.10	-4.24
Social Liberals	1,331	7.95	-6.56
Communist Party of Denmark	623	3.72	-2.10
Justice Party of Denmark	283	1.69	-1.48
Danish Unity	97	0.58	-1.34
Total	16,751		

1945 Danish Folketing election

Parties	Vote		
Parties	Votes	%	+ / -
Social Democrats	4,982	35.94	-7.17
Venstre	3,508	25.30	+5.18
Social Liberals	2,011	14.51	+2.16
Conservatives	1,850	13.34	-2.70
Communist Party of Denmark	807	5.82	New
Justice Party of Denmark	439	3.17	+0.22
Danish Unity	266	1.92	+0.72
Total	13,863		

1943 Danish Folketing election

Parties	Vote		
Parties	Votes	%	+ / -
Social Democrats	5,958	43.11	-5.89
Venstre	2,781	20.12	-0.09
Conservatives	2,216	16.04	+2.30
Social Liberals	1,706	12.35	+1.51
Justice Party of Denmark	407	2.95	+2.24
Farmers' Party	343	2.48	+0.52
National Socialist Workers' Party of Denmark	242	1.75	+0.52
Danish Unity	166	1.20	+1.03
Total	13,819		

=== General elections in the 1930s ===
1939 Danish Folketing election

Parties	Vote		
Parties	Votes	%	+ / -
Social Democrats	6,517	49.00	-3.36
Venstre	2,688	20.21	+0.68
Conservatives	1,827	13.74	+1.34
Social Liberals	1,442	10.84	+0.73
Farmers' Party	260	1.96	-0.53
Communist Party of Denmark	243	1.83	+0.84
National Socialist Workers' Party of Denmark	164	1.23	+0.51
Justice Party of Denmark	95	0.71	-0.70
National Cooperation	41	0.31	New
Danish Unity	22	0.17	New
Total	13,299		

1935 Danish Folketing election

Parties	Vote		
Parties	Votes	%	+ / -
Social Democrats	6,885	52.36	+2.13
Venstre	2,568	19.53	-7.30
Conservatives	1,630	12.40	-0.51
Social Liberals	1,329	10.11	+1.19
Independent People's Party	328	2.49	New
Justice Party of Denmark	185	1.41	+0.65
Communist Party of Denmark	130	0.99	+0.65
National Socialist Workers' Party of Denmark	95	0.72	New
Total	13,150		

1932 Danish Folketing election

Parties	Vote		
Parties	Votes	%	+ / -
Social Democrats	6,230	50.23	+8.44
Venstre	3,328	26.83	+0.75
Conservatives	1,601	12.91	+1.91
Social Liberals	1,106	8.92	-8.81
Justice Party of Denmark	94	0.76	-2.60
Communist Party of Denmark	42	0.34	+0.30
Frederik Petersen	1	0.01	New
Total	12,402		

=== General elections in the 1920s ===
1929 Danish Folketing election

Parties	Vote		
Parties	Votes	%	+ / -
Social Democrats	4,868	41.79	-6.03
Venstre	3,038	26.08	-3.84
Social Liberals	2,065	17.73	+8.52
Conservatives	1,282	11.00	-1.33
Justice Party of Denmark	392	3.36	+2.97
Communist Party of Denmark	5	0.04	-0.28
Total	11,650		

1926 Danish Folketing election

Parties	Vote		
Parties	Votes	%	+ / -
Social Democrats	5,461	47.82	+27.85
Venstre	3,417	29.92	-35.41
Conservatives	1,408	12.33	+11.33
Social Liberals	1,052	9.21	+9.21
Justice Party of Denmark	45	0.39	+0.14
Communist Party of Denmark	37	0.32	+0.22
Total	11,420		

1924 Danish Folketing election

Parties	Vote		
Parties	Votes	%	+ / -
Venstre	10,914	65.33	+30.66
Social Democrats	3,336	19.97	-24.61
Industry Party	1,172	7.02	+4.16
Farmer Party	1,058	6.33	New
Conservatives	167	1.00	-9.29
Justice Party of Denmark	41	0.25	New
Communist Party of Denmark	17	0.10	New
Social Liberals	0	0.00	-7.60
Total	16,705		

September 1920 Danish Folketing election

Parties	Vote		
Parties	Votes	%	+ / -
Social Democrats	4,815	44.58	+3.16
Venstre	3,744	34.67	-2.47
Conservatives	1,111	10.29	+0.35
Social Liberals	821	7.60	-0.16
Industry Party	309	2.86	-0.88
Total	10,800		

July 1920 Danish Folketing election

Parties	Vote		
Parties	Votes	%	+ / -
Social Democrats	3,827	41.42	-0.06
Venstre	3,431	37.14	+3.13
Conservatives	918	9.94	-2.25
Social Liberals	717	7.76	-0.05
Industry Party	346	3.74	-0.78
Total	9,239		

April 1920 Danish Folketing election

Parties	Vote	
Parties	Votes	%
Social Democrats	3,986	41.48
Venstre	3,268	34.01
Conservatives	1,171	12.19
Social Liberals	751	7.81
Industry Party	434	4.52
Total	9,610	

== European Parliament elections results ==
2024 European Parliament election in Denmark

Parties	Vote		
Parties	Votes	%	+ / -
Social Democrats	6,383	19.35	-7.19
Green Left	5,034	15.26	+3.89
Venstre	4,667	14.15	-8.34
Danish People's Party	3,054	9.26	-4.16
Conservatives	2,814	8.53	+3.12
Denmark Democrats	2,706	8.20	New
Moderates	2,361	7.16	New
Liberal Alliance	2,320	7.03	+5.19
Red–Green Alliance	1,557	4.72	-0.45
Social Liberals	1,449	4.39	-2.51
The Alternative	646	1.96	-0.38
Total	32,991		

2019 European Parliament election in Denmark

Parties	Vote		
Parties	Votes	%	+ / -
Social Democrats	10,281	26.54	+4.82
Venstre	8,713	22.49	+6.04
Danish People's Party	5,200	13.42	-16.90
Green Left	4,406	11.37	+2.18
Social Liberals	2,673	6.90	+2.74
Conservatives	2,094	5.41	-2.16
Red–Green Alliance	2,001	5.17	New
People's Movement against the EU	1,750	4.52	-3.78
The Alternative	906	2.34	New
Liberal Alliance	713	1.84	-0.45
Total	38,737		

2014 European Parliament election in Denmark

Parties	Vote		
Parties	Votes	%	+ / -
Danish People's Party	9,951	30.32	+12.31
Social Democrats	7,127	21.72	-2.24
Venstre	5,400	16.45	-2.85
Green Left	3,015	9.19	-5.71
People's Movement against the EU	2,725	8.30	+1.81
Conservatives	2,486	7.57	-4.34
Social Liberals	1,364	4.16	+1.20
Liberal Alliance	752	2.29	+1.81
Total	32,820		

2009 European Parliament election in Denmark

Parties	Vote		
Parties	Votes	%	+ / -
Social Democrats	8,289	23.96	-16.65
Venstre	6,679	19.30	+2.51
Danish People's Party	6,231	18.01	+11.04
Green Left	5,155	14.90	+8.76
Conservatives	4,120	11.91	+0.68
People's Movement against the EU	2,246	6.49	+2.10
Social Liberals	1,023	2.96	-1.79
June Movement	690	1.99	-6.51
Liberal Alliance	165	0.48	New
Total	34,598		

2004 European Parliament election in Denmark

Parties	Vote		
Parties	Votes	%	+ / -
Social Democrats	9,473	40.61	+6.40
Venstre	3,916	16.79	-0.43
Conservatives	2,619	11.23	+3.36
June Movement	1,983	8.50	-5.38
Danish People's Party	1,626	6.97	+2.17
Green Left	1,433	6.14	+0.52
Social Liberals	1,109	4.75	-1.54
People's Movement against the EU	1,024	4.39	-1.29
Christian Democrats	144	0.62	-0.73
Total	23,327		

1999 European Parliament election in Denmark

Parties	Vote		
Parties	Votes	%	+ / -
Social Democrats	8,140	34.21	+1.76
Venstre	4,097	17.22	+0.95
June Movement	3,302	13.88	+0.64
Conservatives	1,872	7.87	-6.69
Social Liberals	1,496	6.29	-0.41
People's Movement against the EU	1,351	5.68	-1.68
Green Left	1,338	5.62	+0.06
Danish People's Party	1,141	4.80	New
Centre Democrats	735	3.09	+2.19
Christian Democrats	321	1.35	+0.66
Progress Party	130	0.55	-1.72
Total	23,793		

1994 European Parliament election in Denmark

Parties	Vote		
Parties	Votes	%	+ / -
Social Democrats	8,248	32.45	+0.76
Venstre	4,135	16.27	+3.40
Conservatives	3,700	14.56	+2.48
June Movement	3,366	13.24	New
People's Movement against the EU	1,870	7.36	-7.54
Social Liberals	1,703	6.70	+4.47
Green Left	1,412	5.56	-3.22
Progress Party	578	2.27	-2.18
Centre Democrats	229	0.90	-8.07
Christian Democrats	176	0.69	-3.35
Total	25,417		

1989 European Parliament election in Denmark

Parties	Vote		
Parties	Votes	%	+ / -
Social Democrats	6,992	31.69	+5.84
People's Movement against the EU	3,286	14.90	-2.52
Venstre	2,839	12.87	+1.15
Conservatives	2,664	12.08	-7.23
Centre Democrats	1,978	8.97	+1.68
Green Left	1,937	8.78	-0.51
Progress Party	981	4.45	+1.42
Christian Democrats	892	4.04	+1.78
Social Liberals	492	2.23	-0.68
Total	22,061		

1984 European Parliament election in Denmark

Parties	Vote	
Parties	Votes	%
Social Democrats	5,864	25.85
Conservatives	4,380	19.31
People's Movement against the EU	3,951	17.42
Venstre	2,658	11.72
Green Left	2,107	9.29
Centre Democrats	1,653	7.29
Progress Party	688	3.03
Social Liberals	661	2.91
Christian Democrats	512	2.26
Left Socialists	212	0.93
Total	22,686	

== Referendums ==
2022 Danish European Union opt-out referendum

Option	Votes	%
✓ YES	25,668	62.51
X NO	15,394	37.49

2015 Danish European Union opt-out referendum

Option	Votes	%
X NO	25,269	57.59
✓ YES	18,611	42.41

2014 Danish Unified Patent Court membership referendum

Option	Votes	%
✓ YES	19,855	61.57
X NO	12,394	38.43

2009 Danish Act of Succession referendum

Option	Votes	%
✓ YES	27,829	84.67
X NO	5,038	15.33

2000 Danish euro referendum

Option	Votes	%
X NO	22,797	55.13
✓ YES	18,553	44.87

1998 Danish Amsterdam Treaty referendum

Option	Votes	%
✓ YES	19,154	54.00
X NO	16,315	46.00

1993 Danish Maastricht Treaty referendum

Option	Votes	%
✓ YES	23,076	57.59
X NO	16,993	42.41

1992 Danish Maastricht Treaty referendum

Option	Votes	%
✓ YES	19,457	50.42
X NO	19,132	49.58

1986 Danish Single European Act referendum

Option	Votes	%
✓ YES	18,223	55.02
X NO	14,896	44.98

1972 Danish European Communities membership referendum

Option	Votes	%
✓ YES	23,331	70.08
X NO	9,960	29.92

1953 Danish constitutional and electoral age referendum

Option	Votes	%
✓ YES	11,609	85.22
X NO	2,013	14.78
23 years	7,765	55.92
21 years	6,120	44.08

1939 Danish constitutional referendum

Option	Votes	%
✓ YES	8,026	89.12
X NO	980	10.88
