= Danish Folketing election, 1920 =

The Danish Folketing election of 1920 may refer to:

- Danish Folketing election, 1920 (April) held on 26 April 1920
- Danish Folketing election, 1920 (July) held on 6 July 1920
- Danish Folketing election, 1920 (September) held on 21 September 1920
