= Bent Hindrup Andersen =

Danish politician

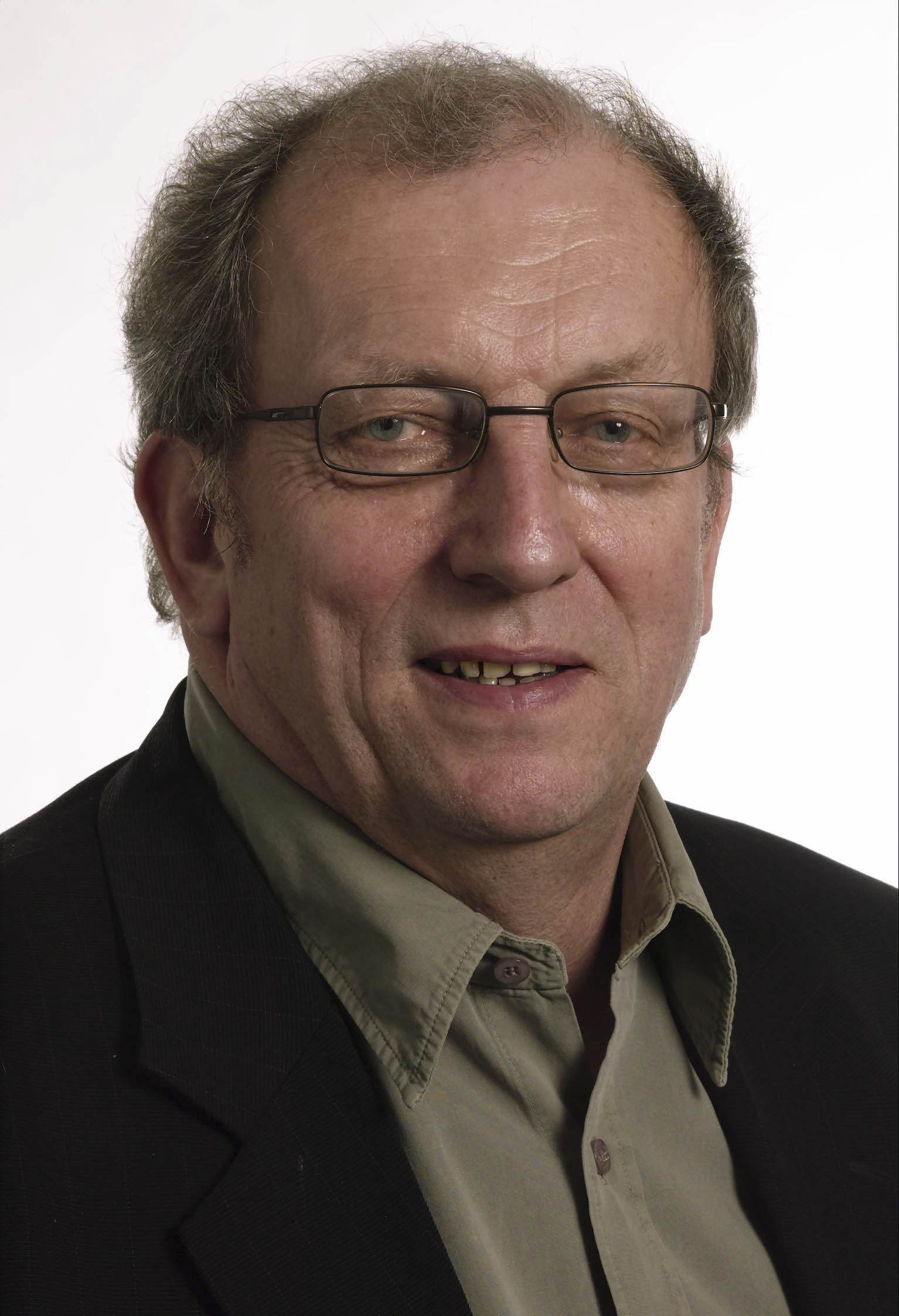
Andersen in 1999

Bent Hindrup Andersen (born 1943) is a Danish politician. He was elected to parliament for the Red–Green Alliance (Denmark) 21 September 1994. He was a member until the 10 March 1998.

On 1 March 2003 he became a member of the European Parliament for the June Movement after Jens Okking (People's Movement against the EU, originally elected for the June Movement) resigned and sat until 19 July 2004.
