= Marxist–Leninist Unity League =

The Marxistisk-Leninistisk Enhedsforbund (English: Marxist–Leninist Unity League) or MLE was a Marxist-Leninist political party in Denmark which existed from 1972 until 1975.

== History ==
The party was established amongst the house squatters' milieu in March 1972 as Den revolutionære Boligorganisation marxister-leninister (English: Revolutionary Inhabitants Organization marxist-leninists) or BOm-l. It was headed by a Central Committee and published the BOml bulletin.

BOm-l had a similar platform to the Communist League Marxist-Leninists (KFML). Discussions were held between the two groups about a merger, and BOm-l declared that they were ready to accept the political leadership of KFML, wherein they would become a 'sectoral organization' of KFML. This sparked new enthusiasm within KFML. However the cultural differences between the theoretical-ideological KFML and the "activist" BOm-l proved to be too large, and the two organizations quickly went from allies to rivals. The split was final when BOm-l reconstituted itself as the Marxistisk-Leninistisk Enhedsforbund (MLE) in February 1973.

MLE and KFML had almost identical programs and both sought recognition from the same foreign parties, such as AKP(ml) (Norway) and KFML (Sweden). In 1974 there was a split in MLE, and about 50% of its members joined KFML. In 1975 MLE was dissolved and the majority of its remaining cadre joined KFML.

== Platform ==
MLE declared itself to be "a communist, Marxist-Leninist organization that puts as its goal the armed, socialist revolution and the construction of the dictatorship of the proletariat in Denmark". MLE struggled actively against Danish membership in the European Economic Community. However, MLE distanced itself from the main anti-EEC movement, the Popular Movement. Instead MLE launched its own anti-EEC front, Arbejderkomiteerne mod EEC (English: Workers Committees against EEC).

MLE published the political newspaper, Tjen Folket.
