= Birgit Bjørnvig =

Danish politician (1936–2015)

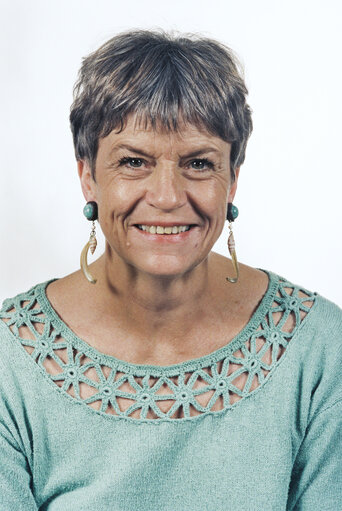

Member of the European Parliament
- In office 1987–1994

Personal details
- Born: Birgit Hornum; 4 January 1936 Copenhagen, Denmark
- Died: 3 October 2015 (aged 79)
- Party: Danish Social Liberal Party

Birgit Bjørnvig née Hornum (1936–2015) was a Danish politician and educator. Brought up in a working-class family in Copenhagen, she trained as a teacher and spent a short period as head of a primary school. In 1970, she married the writer Thorkild Bjørnvig and moved with him to the island of Samsø where she became politically involved. She first represented the Danish Social Liberal Party (Radikale Vestre) from 1983, but then joined the People's Movement against the EU (Folkebevægelsen mod EF) and became a member of the European Parliament for the Rainbow Group, serving two terms until 1994.

== Early life and family ==
Born on 4 January 1936 in Copenhagen, Birgit Hornum was brought up in a working-class family in the city's Vesterbro district. After the war, she was cared for by a farming family on the island of Møn. There, when she was 20, she married a farmer and had her first three children. In 1970, she married the writer Thorkild Bjørnvig with whom she had a son, Thore.

== Career ==
In the mid-1960s, she was employed as a secretary for the writer Karl Bjarnhof. Thanks to him, she met Thorkild Bjørnvig whom she married in 1970 and moved with him to the island of Samsø. For a short period, she served as principal of the Samsø Primary School. It was on Samsø that she became involved in politics, participating at the local level as a member of the Social Liberal Party. In April 1983, she spent a couple of weeks as a Folketing substitute for Bernhard Baunsgaard.

Representing the People's Movement against the EC, in September 1987 she became a member of the Rainbow Group at the European Parliament. From July 1989 until July 1994, she served a second term, chairing the Rainbow Group. From January 1993, at the European Parliament she was affiliated with the Danish June Movement which she had helped to establish.

Birgit Hornum Bjørnvig died on 3 October 2015 and is buried in Nordby Cemetery, Samsø.
