= Youth against the EU =

logo.

Youth Against the EU (Danish: Ungdom mod EU) is the youth wing of the People's Movement against the EU.
