= 1918 Danish Folketing election =

Election for the lower house of Danish Parliament

- 22 April 1918
- All 140 seats in the Folketing; 71 seats needed for a majority
Party	Leader	Vote %	Seats	+/–
Venstre	Klaus Berntsen	29.41	45	+2
Social Democrats	Thorvald Stauning	28.66	39	+7
Social Liberals	Carl Theodor Zahle	20.67	32	+1
Conservatives	Emil Piper	18.29	22	New
Industry		1.30	1	New
Independents	–	0.40	1	+1
This lists parties that won seats. See the complete results below.
Prime Minister before	Prime Minister after
Carl Theodor Zahle; Social Liberals	Carl Theodor Zahle; Social Liberals

Folketing elections were held in Denmark on 22 April 1918, the first in which women could vote. The result was a victory for Venstre, which won 45 of the 140 seats in the Folketing, which had been expanded from 114 to 140 seats. Voter turnout was 75.5%.

== Electoral system ==
The Folketing was elected by rural–urban proportional representation. Copenhagen had 24 members elected by party-list proportional representation using the d'Hondt system, while in the rest of the country 93 members (42 in the Danish Islands and 51 in Jutland) were elected in single-member constituencies using first-past-the-post voting. There were a further 23 leveling seats to make the results more proportional.

Of the 23 leveling seats, twenty (nine in the islands and eleven in Jutland) were allocated on a regional basis, and three (one in the islands and two in Jutland) were allocated based on the nationwide vote (including Copenhagen). The allocation of candidates to leveling seats was based on a best-loser rule, using a form of Scorporo; in each single-member constituency a Hare quota of votes for the appropriate region was subtracted from the winner's votes and the remainders were pooled at a county level. The candidates with the highest proportion of the votes relative to the region's Hare quota were allocated the leveling seats.

The 1918 elections were the only ones in Danish history to feature this mixed system. Future elections would be entirely using proportional representation with the single-member districts not affecting the party-level results.

== Results ==
Party	Votes	%	Seats	+/–
Venstre	269,646	29.41	45	+2
Social Democratic Party	262,796	28.66	39	+7
Danish Social Liberal Party	189,521	20.67	32	+1
Conservative People's Party	167,743	18.29	22	New
Industry List	11,934	1.30	1	New
New Right	4,764	0.52	0	New
Voters of 1918	4,407	0.48	0	New
Socialist Workers Party	1,410	0.15	0	New
Independent Social Democracy	1,086	0.12	0	New
Independents	3,622	0.40	1	0
Total	916,929	100.00	140	+26
Valid votes	916,929	99.62		
Invalid/blank votes	3,468	0.38		
Total votes	920,397	100.00		
Registered voters/turnout	1,218,901	75.51		
Source: Nohlen & Stöver
