= People's Movement against the EU =

Danish political party

People's Movement against the EU Folkebevægelsen mod EU
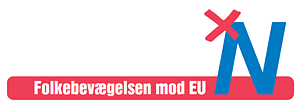
- Chairman: Susanna Dyre-Greensite
- Founded: 1972
- Headquarters: Tordenskjoldsgade 21, st.th. DK-1055 København K
- Newspaper: Folk i Bevægelse
- Youth wing: Youth of the Popular Movement against EU
- Ideology: Hard Euroscepticism; Souverainism
- Political position: Far-left
- Regional affiliation: Nordic Green Left Alliance
- European affiliation: TEAM, EUdemocrats
- European Parliament group: European United Left - Nordic Green Left
- Colours: Medium Violet Red
- Folketing: 0 / 179 (Note: Only 175 of the 179 seats in the Danish Parliament, the Folketing, are obtainable by Danish political parties as Greenland and the Faroe Islands are assigned two seats each due to their status as territories in the Kingdom of Denmark.)
- European Parliament: 0 / 15

Election symbol
- N

Website
- folkebevaegelsen.dk

The People's Movement against the EU (Danish: Folkebevægelsen mod EU) is a far-left political association in Denmark against the European Union. It was founded in 1972 as a cross-party campaign platform for a 'no' vote in Denmark's referendum on EEC membership. The People's Movement was represented in the European Parliament from 1979 until 2019, when it lost its single seat in the European Parliament election.

The movement has approximately 3,500 personal members, as well as collective members such as political parties, NGOs and trade unions (mostly local branches). The individual members are organised in about 100 local branches.

== Policies ==
The primary objective of the movement is to withdraw the country from the EU and rejoin the European Free Trade Association, unlike some other Eurosceptic organisations which hope to be able to reform or downgrade the EU. According to the movement, it supports democracy, sustainable development and increased cooperation in organisations like the United Nations, Organization for Security and Co-operation in Europe, the Council of Europe and the Nordic Council. It strongly opposes the Lisbon treaty and has campaigned for a Danish referendum on the EU Constitution.

The People's Movement against the EU is a cross-party movement. It does not regard itself a political party and claims to be non-affiliated to the traditional left/right-scale, hence it does not contest national parliamentary or local elections. Its traditional base is found among left-wingers and trade union members, but there are also non-partisans and non-socialist members, e.g., from the Social Liberal Party, the Social Democrats, the Conservative Party, the Green Party and the small Georgist liberal Justice Party. The movement aims at a cooperation with other political forces, although it has distanced itself from the right-wing eurosceptical Danish People's Party.

The term People's Movement (another possible translation is Popular Movement) is common in Denmark and does not hint at socialism, but rather means 'broad movement for a common cause'. Several Danish parties label themselves people's parties (folkeparti).

== European Parliament ==
In the 2004 election, it gained 5.2% of the national vote, electing one MEP. It has been represented in the European Parliament since 1979 when direct elections were introduced. In every election since 1994, it has been part of an electoral coalition with the euro-sceptic June Movement.

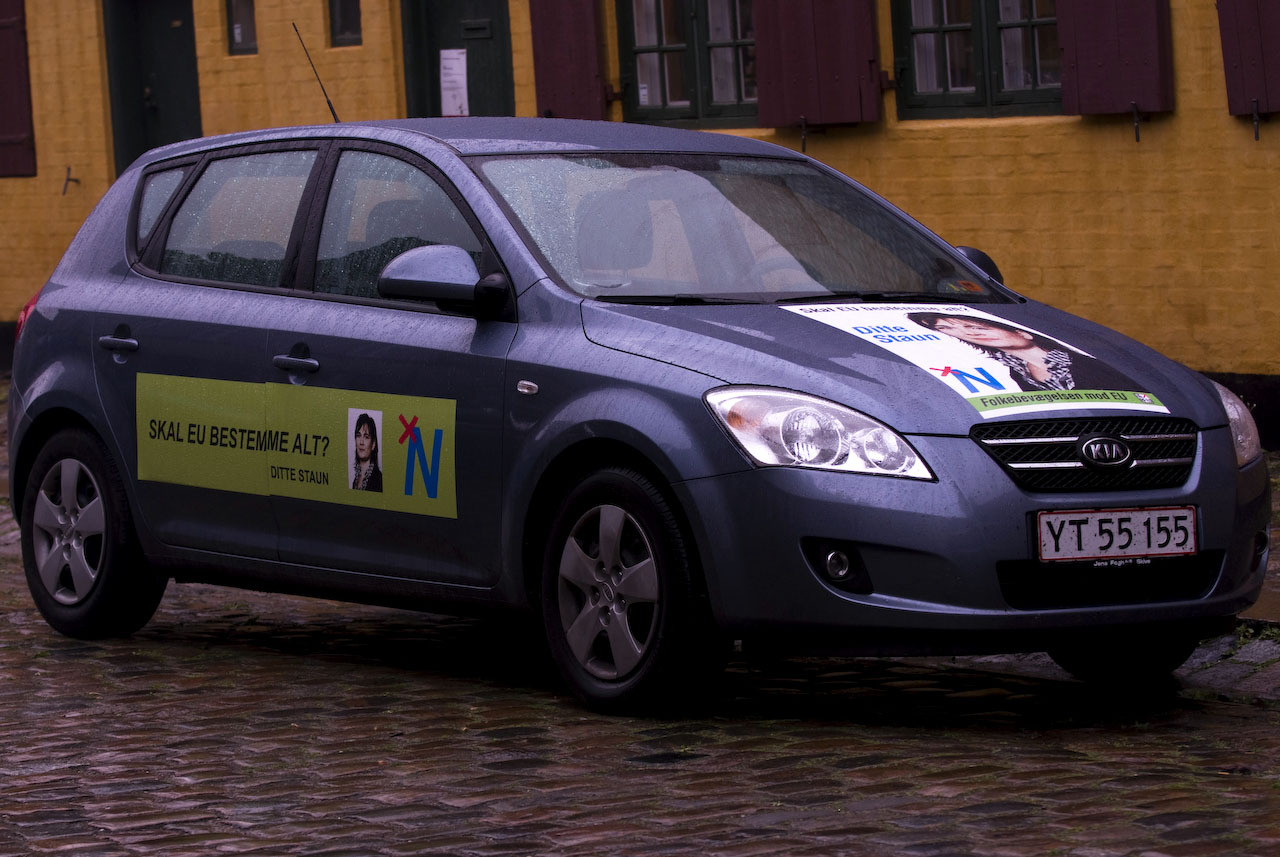
Car showing People's Movement against the EU election sticker

Until 2002, they were part of the EDD group in the European Parliament, but then switched to being associate members of the GUE-NGL group. Ole Krarup stated that the other Danish subgroup of EDD, Jens-Peter Bonde from the June Movement, increasingly aimed at "democratising" or "improving" the EU, according to Krarup making it impossible for the People's Movement to pursue their policies within the group. Krarup claimed that the group membership was a primarily technical matter, and that only the GUE-NGL group could secure full political autonomy of the People's Movement. He stated that the movement's political cross-spectrum position was not affected.

The People's Movement is a member of EUdemocrats and TEAM (the European Alliance of EU-critical Movements) and the coordinator of TEAM is currently Jesper Morville from the People's Movement.

At the 2019 election, The People's Movement lost their single seat, and for the first time since 1979, they are not represented in the parliament. The loss was widely regarded as caused by the Red-Green Alliance, who traditionally have supported the party, but decided to contest the election for the first time, and won a single seat. Incumbent MEP Rina Ronja Kari reacted by saying that the movement would live on, and that "the EU-opposition is not dead". Henrik Overgaard-Nielsen, formerly of the People's Movement was elected in North West England from the Brexit Party. In October 2019 the office as chairman was established, and in November Susanna Dyre-Greensite was elected to the post.

=== Election results ===
Election year	# of overall votes	% of overall vote	% of Danish vote	# of overall seats won	# of Danish seats won	+/-
1979	365,760	20.9 (#2)		4 / 16		
1984	413.808	20.6 (#2)		4 / 16		0
1989	338,953	18.9 (#2)		4 / 16		0
1994	214,735	10.3 (#5)		2 / 16		▼2
1999	143,709	7.3 (#6)		1 / 16		▼1
2004	97,986	5.2 (#8)		1 / 14		0
2009	168,555	7.2 (#6)		1 / 13		0
2014	183,724	8.1 (#6)		1 / 13		0
2019	102,101	3.7 (#8)		0 / 14		▼1

=== Members of the European Parliament ===
- Else Hammerich (1979–1989)
- Sven Skovmand (1979–1984)
- Jørgen Bøgh (1979–1987)
- Jens-Peter Bonde (1979–1992) – June Movement (1992–2008)
- Ib Christensen (1984–1994)
- Birgit Bjørnvig (1987–1992) – June Movement (1992–1994)
- Ulla Sandbæk (1989–1994)
- Lis Jensen (1994–1999)
- Jens Okking (2002–2003) – June Movement (1999–2002), replaced by Bent Hindrup Andersen in 2003
- Ole Krarup (1994–2006)
- Søren Søndergaard (2007–2014)
- Rina Ronja Kari (2014–2019)

=== Election to the European Parliament May 2014 ===
The People's Movement elected the following candidates at its congress in Aalborg 26–27 October 2013

The first five candidates

- Rina Ronja Kari, MEP
- Lave Knud Broch, vice president of EUDemocrats and spokesperson for the EU-critical network of the Danish Social Liberal Party
- Ole Nors Nielsen, union representative
- Christian Juhl, member of the Danish Parliament for Enhedslisten
- Karina Rohr Sørensen, former spokesperson for the People's Movement

== Youth wing ==
The movement's youth wing is the Youth of the Popular Movement against EU.

== See also ==
- Marxist–Leninist Unity League, another anti EEC group, 1972–1975
