= Industry Party =

Industry Party Erhvervspartiet
- Founded: 1917

The Industry Party (Danish: Erhvervspartiet) was a political party in Denmark in the 1910s and 1920s. It aimed to represent small and medium traders, primarily in Copenhagen.

== History ==
The party was established in 1917, and received 1% of the vote in the 1918 elections, when it won a single seat. The party increased its vote share to 3% in the April 1920 elections, winning four seats. It maintained its four seats in the July 1920 elections, but was reduced to three seats in the September 1920 elections.

In 1922 the party split in two, with both factions significantly weakened. In the 1924 elections the party received just 0.2% of the national vote and lost all three seats.

== Election results ==
=== Folketing ===
| Election | Votes | % | +/– | Seats | +/– |
|---|---|---|---|---|---|
| 1918 | 11,934 | 1.30 | New | 1 / 140 | New |
| April 1920 | 29,464 | 2.88 | +1.58 | 4 / 139 | ▲3 |
| July 1920 | 25,627 | 2.69 | –0.19 | 4 / 139 | Steady |
| September 1920 | 27,403 | 2.26 | –0.43 | 3 / 148 | ▼1 |
| 1924 | 2,102 | 0.16 | –2.10 | 0 / 148 | ▼3 |
