= 1924 Danish Folketing election =

Election for the lower house of Danish Parliament

- 11 April 1924
- All 149 seats in the Folketing; 75 seats needed for a majority
Party	Leader	Vote %	Seats	+/–
Elected in Denmark
Social Democrats	Thorvald Stauning	36.63	55	+7
Venstre	Niels Neergaard	28.27	44	−7
Conservatives	Emil Piper	18.94	28	+1
Social Liberals	Carl Theodor Zahle	12.98	20	+2
Schleswig Party	Johannes Schmidt-Wodder	0.60	1	0
Elected in the Faroe Islands
Union	Oliver Effersøe	–	1	0
This lists parties that won seats. See the complete results below.
Prime Minister before	Prime Minister after
Niels Neergaard; Venstre	Thorvald Stauning; Social Democrats

Folketing elections were held in Denmark on 11 April 1924. The result was a victory for the Social Democratic Party led by Thorvald Stauning, which won 55 of the 149 seats. Voter turnout was 78.6% in Denmark proper. In the Faroe Islands constituency there was only one candidate, who was returned unopposed.

== Results ==
Party	Votes	%	Seats	+/–
Denmark
Social Democratic Party	469,949	36.63	55	+7
Venstre	362,682	28.27	44	-7
Conservative People's Party	242,955	18.94	28	+1
Danish Social Liberal Party	166,476	12.98	20	+2
Justice Party of Denmark	12,643	0.99	0	New
Farmer Party	12,196	0.95	0	New
Schleswig Party	7,715	0.60	1	0
Communist Party of Denmark	6,219	0.48	0	0
Industry Party	2,102	0.16	0	–3
Total	1,282,937	100.00	148	0
Valid votes	1,282,937	99.68		
Invalid/blank votes	4,147	0.32		
Total votes	1,287,084	100.00		
Registered voters/turnout	1,637,564	78.60		
Faroe Islands
Union Party–Venstre		–	1	0
Total			1	0
Source: Nohlen & Stöver
