= July 1920 Danish Folketing election =

Election for the lower house of Danish Parliament

- 6 July 1920
- All 140 seats in the Folketing; 71 seats needed for a majority
| Party | Leader | Vote % | Seats | +/– |
Elected in Denmark
| Venstre | Niels Neergaard | 36.11 | 51 | +3 |
| Social Democrats | Thorvald Stauning | 29.91 | 42 | 0 |
| Conservatives | Emil Piper | 18.91 | 26 | −2 |
| Social Liberals | Carl Theodor Zahle | 11.53 | 16 | −1 |
| Industry | | 2.69 | 4 | 0 |
Elected in the Faroe Islands
| Union | Oliver Effersøe | 70.55 | 1 | 0 |
This lists parties that won seats. See the complete results below.
| Prime Minister before | Prime Minister after |
|---|---|
| Niels Neergaard; Venstre | Niels Neergaard; Venstre |

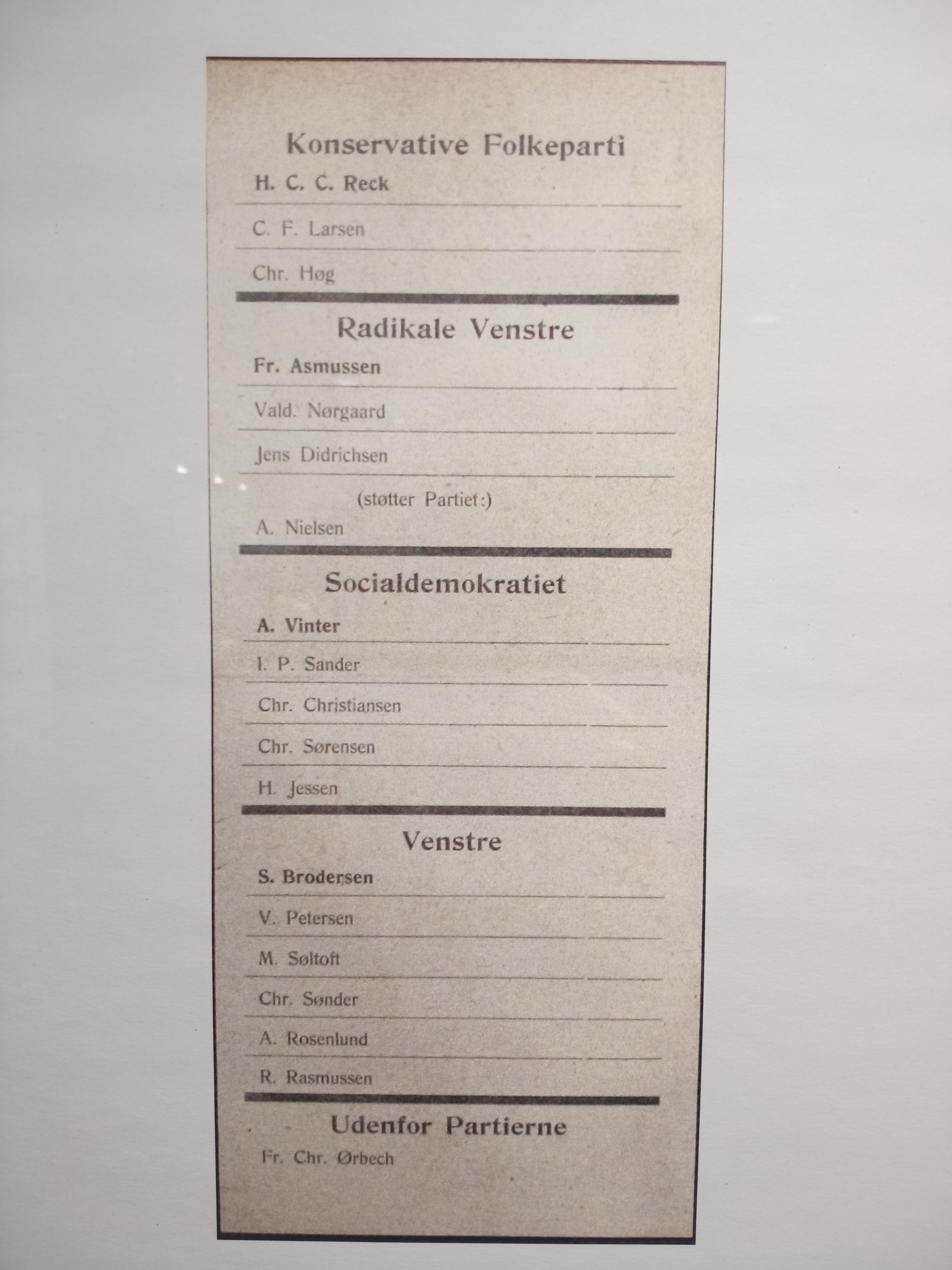
Ballot paper

Folketing elections were held in Denmark on 6 July 1920, except in the Faroe Islands, where they were held on 3 August. The result was a victory for Venstre, which won 51 of the 140 seats. Voter turnout was 74.9% in Denmark proper and 46.4% in the Faroe Islands.

== Results ==
| Party | Votes | % | Seats | +/– |
Denmark
| Venstre | 344,351 | 36.11 | 51 | +3 |
| Social Democratic Party | 285,166 | 29.91 | 42 | 0 |
| Conservative People's Party | 180,293 | 18.91 | 26 | –2 |
| Danish Social Liberal Party | 109,931 | 11.53 | 16 | –1 |
| Industry Party | 25,627 | 2.69 | 4 | 0 |
| Independents | 8,193 | 0.86 | 0 | New |
| Total | 953,561 | 100.00 | 139 | 0 |
| Valid votes | 953,561 | 99.79 | | |
| Invalid/blank votes | 2,004 | 0.21 | | |
| Total votes | 955,565 | 100.00 | | |
| Registered voters/turnout | 1,276,302 | 74.87 | | |
Faroe Islands
| Union Party–Venstre | 2,693 | 70.55 | 1 | 0 |
| Independents | 1,124 | 29.45 | 0 | 0 |
| Total | 3,817 | 100.00 | 1 | 0 |
| Valid votes | 3,817 | 99.61 | | |
| Invalid/blank votes | 15 | 0.39 | | |
| Total votes | 3,832 | 100.00 | | |
| Registered voters/turnout | 8,259 | 46.40 | | |
Source: Nohlen & Stöver
