= September 1920 Danish Folketing election =

Election for the lower house of Danish Parliament

- 21 September 1920
- All 149 seats in the Folketing; 75 seats needed for a majority
Party	Leader	Vote %	Seats	+/–
Elected in Denmark
Venstre	Niels Neergaard	33.97	51	0
Social Democrats	Thorvald Stauning	32.16	48	+6
Conservatives	Emil Piper	17.89	27	+1
Social Liberals	Carl Theodor Zahle	12.14	18	+2
Industry		2.26	3	−1
Schleswig Party	Johannes Schmidt-Wodder	0.62	1	New
Elected in the Faroe Islands
Union	Oliver Effersøe	60.22	1	0
This lists parties that won seats. See the complete results below.
Prime Minister before	Prime Minister after
Niels Neergaard; Venstre	Niels Neergaard; Venstre

Folketing elections were held in Denmark on 21 September 1920, except in the Faroe Islands, where they were held on 30 October. They were the first in which South Jutland County participated since the Schleswig Plebiscites and the return to Danish rule, and the total number of seats in the Folketing was increased from 140 to 149. The result was a victory for Venstre, which won 51 of the 149 seats. Voter turnout was 77.0% in Denmark proper and 56.2% in the Faroe Islands.

== Results ==
Party	Votes	%	Seats	+/–
Denmark
Venstre	411,661	33.97	51	0
Social Democratic Party	389,653	32.16	48	+6
Conservative People's Party	216,733	17.89	27	+1
Danish Social Liberal Party	147,120	12.14	18	+2
Industry Party	27,403	2.26	3	–1
Schleswig Party	7,505	0.62	1	New
Free Social Democrats	6,460	0.53	0	New
Danish Left Socialist Party	5,160	0.43	0	New
Total	1,211,695	100.00	148	+9
Valid votes	1,211,695	99.78		
Invalid/blank votes	2,673	0.22		
Total votes	1,214,368	100.00		
Registered voters/turnout	1,576,716	77.02		
Faroe Islands
Union Party–Venstre	3,243	60.22	1	0
Independents	2,142	39.78	0	0
Total	5,385	100.00	1	0
Valid votes	5,385	99.80		
Invalid/blank votes	11	0.20		
Total votes	5,396	100.00		
Registered voters/turnout	9,593	56.25		
Source: Nohlen & Stöver
