= April 1920 Danish Folketing election =

Election for the lower house of Danish Parliament

- 26 April 1920
- All 140 seats in the Folketing; 71 seats needed for a majority
Party	Leader	Vote %	Seats	+/–
Elected in Denmark
Venstre	Niels Neergaard	34.23	48	+4
Social Democrats	Thorvald Stauning	29.32	42	+3
Conservatives	Emil Piper	19.67	28	+6
Social Liberals	Carl Theodor Zahle	11.93	17	−15
Industry		2.88	4	+3
Elected in the Faroe Islands
Union	Oliver Effersøe	64.48	1	0
This lists parties that won seats. See the complete results below.
Prime Minister before	Prime Minister after
Michael Pedersen Friis; Independent	Niels Neergaard; Venstre

Folketing elections were held in Denmark on 26 April 1920, except in the Faroe Islands, where they were held on 20 May. The election campaign was the most aggressive and bitter in Denmark in the 20th century. Voter turnout was 80.6% in Denmark proper and 58.8% in the Faroe Islands.

== Background ==
In what is referred to as Easter Crisis of 1920, on 29 March King Christian X dismissed the government, the Cabinet of Zahle II consisting of members of the Danish Social Liberal Party, replacing it with a caretaker cabinet led by Otto Liebe on 30 March, as he was of the opinion that Central Schleswig should be returned to Denmark regardless of the outcome of the Schleswig Plebiscites. This led to massive protests and was referred to as a coup d'état by the Danish Social Liberal Party and the Social Democratic Party. On 5 April 1920 a compromise was reached, the government was replaced with another caretaker cabinet headed by Michael Pedersen Friis and a new election was to be held as soon as possible.

== Electoral system ==
Prior to the elections, a new electoral law was enacted, with all seats now elected by party-list proportional representation in multi-member constituencies, with levelling seats used to make seat shares more proportional with national vote shares. The districts elected between two and seven members each.

== Results ==
Party	Votes	%	Seats	+/–
Denmark
Venstre	350,563	34.23	48	+4
Social Democratic Party	300,345	29.32	42	+3
Conservative People's Party	201,499	19.67	28	+6
Danish Social Liberal Party	122,160	11.93	17	–15
Industry Party	29,464	2.88	4	+3
Centre	9,056	0.88	0	New
Free Social Democrats	7,260	0.71	0	New
Danish Left Socialist Party	3,859	0.38	0	0
Total	1,024,206	100.00	139	0
Valid votes	1,024,206	99.70		
Invalid/blank votes	3,082	0.30		
Total votes	1,027,288	100.00		
Registered voters/turnout	1,274,377	80.61		
Faroe Islands
Union Party–Venstre	3,117	64.48	1	0
Independents	1,717	35.52	0	–
Total	4,834	100.00	1	0
Valid votes	4,834	99.71		
Invalid/blank votes	14	0.29		
Total votes	4,848	100.00		
Registered voters/turnout	8,250	58.76		
Source: Nohlen & Stöver
