= Tårnby (nomination district) =

- Tårnby
- Nomination district constituency for the Folketing
- Location of Tårnby within Copenhagen

- Location of Copenhagen within Denmark
- Municipalities: Dragør; Tårnby
- Constituency: Copenhagen
- Electorate: 40,530 (2022)

Current constituency
- Created: 1966 (Note: It has existed under the current boundaries since 1966. Prior to 2007 it was known as the Amager district.)

Tårnby nominating district is one of the 92 nominating districts that was created for Danish elections following the 2007 municipal reform. It consists of Dragør and Tårnby municipality. It has existed under the current boundaries since 1966. Prior to 2007 it was known as the Amager district.

In general elections, the district tends to vote close to the national result when looking at the voter split between the two blocs.

== General elections results ==
=== General elections in the 2020s ===
2022 Danish general election

| Parties | Vote | | |
| Parties | Votes | % | + / - |
|---|---|---|---|
| Social Democrats | 11,137 | 32.99 | +4.73 |
| Venstre | 3,611 | 10.70 | -11.38 |
| Moderates | 3,404 | 10.08 | New |
| Green Left | 2,670 | 7.91 | +0.57 |
| Liberal Alliance | 2,558 | 7.58 | +5.57 |
| Conservatives | 2,120 | 6.28 | -0.09 |
| Denmark Democrats | 1,824 | 5.40 | New |
| Red–Green Alliance | 1,482 | 4.39 | -1.58 |
| Danish People's Party | 1,349 | 4.00 | -7.34 |
| New Right | 1,244 | 3.69 | +1.23 |
| Social Liberals | 966 | 2.86 | -4.94 |
| The Alternative | 926 | 2.74 | +0.37 |
| Independent Greens | 349 | 1.03 | New |
| Christian Democrats | 73 | 0.22 | -0.48 |
| Flemming Blicher | 38 | 0.11 | New |
| Tom Gillesberg | 6 | 0.02 | +0.01 |
| Total | 33,757 | | |

=== General elections in the 2010s ===
2019 Danish general election

| Parties | Vote | | |
| Parties | Votes | % | + / - |
|---|---|---|---|
| Social Democrats | 9,647 | 28.26 | +0.95 |
| Venstre | 7,538 | 22.08 | +6.49 |
| Danish People's Party | 3,871 | 11.34 | -15.62 |
| Social Liberals | 2,661 | 7.80 | +3.76 |
| Green Left | 2,504 | 7.34 | +3.10 |
| Conservatives | 2,175 | 6.37 | +2.91 |
| Red–Green Alliance | 2,039 | 5.97 | -1.48 |
| New Right | 840 | 2.46 | New |
| The Alternative | 809 | 2.37 | -1.14 |
| Stram Kurs | 716 | 2.10 | New |
| Liberal Alliance | 687 | 2.01 | -5.00 |
| Klaus Riskær Pedersen Party | 377 | 1.10 | New |
| Christian Democrats | 239 | 0.70 | +0.41 |
| Pierre Tavares | 18 | 0.05 | New |
| John Jørgensen | 4 | 0.01 | New |
| Tom Gillesberg | 4 | 0.01 | 0.00 |
| John Erik Wagner | 3 | 0.01 | 0.00 |
| Tommy Schou Christesen | 2 | 0.01 | New |
| Total | 34,134 | | |

2015 Danish general election

| Parties | Vote | | |
| Parties | Votes | % | + / - |
|---|---|---|---|
| Social Democrats | 9,544 | 27.31 | +4.75 |
| Danish People's Party | 9,421 | 26.96 | +9.51 |
| Venstre | 5,448 | 15.59 | -9.21 |
| Red–Green Alliance | 2,603 | 7.45 | +0.36 |
| Liberal Alliance | 2,450 | 7.01 | +2.22 |
| Green Left | 1,483 | 4.24 | -4.65 |
| Social Liberals | 1,413 | 4.04 | -4.39 |
| The Alternative | 1,226 | 3.51 | New |
| Conservatives | 1,210 | 3.46 | -2.19 |
| Christian Democrats | 101 | 0.29 | +0.01 |
| Kashif Ahmad | 34 | 0.10 | New |
| John Erik Wagner | 5 | 0.01 | -0.01 |
| Tom Gillesberg | 4 | 0.01 | -0.01 |
| Jan Elkjær | 0 | 0.00 | New |
| Total | 34,942 | | |

2011 Danish general election

| Parties | Vote | | |
| Parties | Votes | % | + / - |
|---|---|---|---|
| Venstre | 8,698 | 24.80 | +2.87 |
| Social Democrats | 7,913 | 22.56 | -4.10 |
| Danish People's Party | 6,119 | 17.45 | -1.30 |
| Green Left | 3,119 | 8.89 | -3.94 |
| Social Liberals | 2,955 | 8.43 | +4.26 |
| Red–Green Alliance | 2,485 | 7.09 | +5.47 |
| Conservatives | 1,980 | 5.65 | -5.04 |
| Liberal Alliance | 1,680 | 4.79 | +1.87 |
| Christian Democrats | 98 | 0.28 | -0.11 |
| John Erik Wagner | 8 | 0.02 | +0.01 |
| Tom Gillesberg | 7 | 0.02 | +0.01 |
| Klaus Trier Tuxen | 6 | 0.02 | New |
| Mads Vestergaard | 2 | 0.01 | New |
| Pierre Tavares | 0 | 0.00 | New |
| Morten Versner | 0 | 0.00 | New |
| Total | 35,072 | | |

=== General elections in the 2000s ===
2007 Danish general election

| Parties | Vote | | |
| Parties | Votes | % | + / - |
|---|---|---|---|
| Social Democrats | 9,102 | 26.66 | -0.37 |
| Venstre | 7,489 | 21.93 | -3.53 |
| Danish People's Party | 6,401 | 18.75 | -0.08 |
| Green Left | 4,381 | 12.83 | +6.82 |
| Conservatives | 3,650 | 10.69 | +0.42 |
| Social Liberals | 1,424 | 4.17 | -2.84 |
| New Alliance | 997 | 2.92 | New |
| Red–Green Alliance | 553 | 1.62 | -1.71 |
| Christian Democrats | 134 | 0.39 | -0.35 |
| John Erik Wagner | 4 | 0.01 | New |
| Tom Gillesberg | 3 | 0.01 | New |
| Vibeke Baden Laursen | 3 | 0.01 | New |
| Amir Becirovic | 1 | 0.00 | New |
| Nicolai Krogh Mittet | 1 | 0.00 | New |
| Total | 34,143 | | |

2005 Danish general election

| Parties | Vote | | |
| Parties | Votes | % | + / - |
|---|---|---|---|
| Social Democrats | 8,979 | 27.03 | -6.11 |
| Venstre | 8,459 | 25.46 | -2.23 |
| Danish People's Party | 6,255 | 18.83 | +2.12 |
| Conservatives | 3,412 | 10.27 | +3.11 |
| Social Liberals | 2,328 | 7.01 | +3.18 |
| Green Left | 1,997 | 6.01 | -0.16 |
| Red–Green Alliance | 1,105 | 3.33 | +1.32 |
| Centre Democrats | 379 | 1.14 | -0.65 |
| Christian Democrats | 245 | 0.74 | -0.44 |
| Minority Party | 60 | 0.18 | New |
| Nahid Yazdanyar | 5 | 0.02 | New |
| Total | 33,224 | | |

2001 Danish general election

| Parties | Vote | | |
| Parties | Votes | % | + / - |
|---|---|---|---|
| Social Democrats | 11,562 | 33.14 | -7.79 |
| Venstre | 9,661 | 27.69 | +10.03 |
| Danish People's Party | 5,830 | 16.71 | +4.98 |
| Conservatives | 2,499 | 7.16 | -1.66 |
| Green Left | 2,152 | 6.17 | -1.28 |
| Social Liberals | 1,337 | 3.83 | +1.24 |
| Red–Green Alliance | 702 | 2.01 | -0.51 |
| Centre Democrats | 624 | 1.79 | -3.35 |
| Christian People's Party | 412 | 1.18 | +0.11 |
| Progress Party | 109 | 0.31 | -1.25 |
| Total | 34,888 | | |

=== General elections in the 1990s ===
1998 Danish general election

| Parties | Vote | | |
| Parties | Votes | % | + / - |
|---|---|---|---|
| Social Democrats | 14,120 | 40.93 | +0.37 |
| Venstre | 6,091 | 17.66 | +1.86 |
| Danish People's Party | 4,045 | 11.73 | New |
| Conservatives | 3,042 | 8.82 | -7.99 |
| Green Left | 2,571 | 7.45 | -0.01 |
| Centre Democrats | 1,774 | 5.14 | +1.72 |
| Social Liberals | 893 | 2.59 | -0.84 |
| Red–Green Alliance | 868 | 2.52 | -0.60 |
| Progress Party | 538 | 1.56 | -5.43 |
| Christian People's Party | 368 | 1.07 | +0.19 |
| Mogens Glistrup | 100 | 0.29 | -0.18 |
| Democratic Renewal | 78 | 0.23 | New |
| Poul Bregninge | 5 | 0.01 | New |
| Anders Kofoed | 2 | 0.01 | New |
| Total | 34,495 | | |

1994 Danish general election

| Parties | Vote | | |
| Parties | Votes | % | + / - |
|---|---|---|---|
| Social Democrats | 13,837 | 40.56 | -1.13 |
| Conservatives | 5,734 | 16.81 | -2.19 |
| Venstre | 5,390 | 15.80 | +8.21 |
| Green Left | 2,545 | 7.46 | -1.44 |
| Progress Party | 2,383 | 6.99 | +2.52 |
| Social Liberals | 1,171 | 3.43 | +0.63 |
| Centre Democrats | 1,165 | 3.42 | -4.73 |
| Red–Green Alliance | 1,066 | 3.12 | +1.82 |
| Christian People's Party | 299 | 0.88 | -0.05 |
| Preben Møller Hansen | 248 | 0.73 | New |
| Mogens Glistrup | 160 | 0.47 | New |
| Niels I. Meyer | 112 | 0.33 | New |
| Torben Faber | 4 | 0.01 | New |
| John Ziegler | 0 | 0.00 | New |
| Total | 34,114 | | |

1990 Danish general election

| Parties | Vote | | |
| Parties | Votes | % | + / - |
|---|---|---|---|
| Social Democrats | 14,059 | 41.69 | +9.97 |
| Conservatives | 6,407 | 19.00 | -3.53 |
| Green Left | 3,001 | 8.90 | -7.51 |
| Centre Democrats | 2,748 | 8.15 | +2.07 |
| Venstre | 2,560 | 7.59 | +4.43 |
| Progress Party | 1,509 | 4.47 | -3.44 |
| Common Course | 1,363 | 4.04 | +0.91 |
| Social Liberals | 943 | 2.80 | -2.75 |
| Red–Green Alliance | 439 | 1.30 | New |
| Christian People's Party | 312 | 0.93 | +0.05 |
| The Greens | 200 | 0.59 | -0.68 |
| Justice Party of Denmark | 173 | 0.51 | New |
| Humanist Party | 8 | 0.02 | New |
| Total | 33,722 | | |

=== General elections in the 1980s ===
1988 Danish general election

| Parties | Vote | | |
| Parties | Votes | % | + / - |
|---|---|---|---|
| Social Democrats | 10,976 | 31.72 | +1.59 |
| Conservatives | 7,797 | 22.53 | -1.34 |
| Green Left | 5,678 | 16.41 | -2.59 |
| Progress Party | 2,736 | 7.91 | +3.68 |
| Centre Democrats | 2,103 | 6.08 | +0.05 |
| Social Liberals | 1,921 | 5.55 | -0.36 |
| Venstre | 1,092 | 3.16 | +1.24 |
| Common Course | 1,082 | 3.13 | -0.85 |
| The Greens | 441 | 1.27 | +0.02 |
| Communist Party of Denmark | 355 | 1.03 | +0.07 |
| Christian People's Party | 306 | 0.88 | -0.09 |
| Left Socialists | 110 | 0.32 | -0.68 |
| Leif Hilt | 7 | 0.02 | New |
| Total | 34,604 | | |

1987 Danish general election

| Parties | Vote | | |
| Parties | Votes | % | + / - |
|---|---|---|---|
| Social Democrats | 10,604 | 30.13 | -5.01 |
| Conservatives | 8,398 | 23.87 | -2.13 |
| Green Left | 6,686 | 19.00 | +3.08 |
| Centre Democrats | 2,121 | 6.03 | +1.60 |
| Social Liberals | 2,080 | 5.91 | +0.58 |
| Progress Party | 1,488 | 4.23 | +0.74 |
| Common Course | 1,399 | 3.98 | New |
| Venstre | 677 | 1.92 | -1.42 |
| The Greens | 439 | 1.25 | New |
| Left Socialists | 353 | 1.00 | -1.26 |
| Christian People's Party | 340 | 0.97 | -0.22 |
| Communist Party of Denmark | 339 | 0.96 | +0.07 |
| Justice Party of Denmark | 170 | 0.48 | -1.39 |
| Humanist Party | 68 | 0.19 | New |
| Socialist Workers Party | 14 | 0.04 | -0.07 |
| Marxist–Leninists Party | 6 | 0.02 | +0.01 |
| Carsten Grøn-Nielsen | 5 | 0.01 | 0.00 |
| Per Hillersborg | 2 | 0.01 | New |
| Total | 35,189 | | |

1984 Danish general election

| Parties | Vote | | |
| Parties | Votes | % | + / - |
|---|---|---|---|
| Social Democrats | 12,663 | 35.14 | -0.65 |
| Conservatives | 9,367 | 26.00 | +8.50 |
| Green Left | 5,735 | 15.92 | -0.21 |
| Social Liberals | 1,921 | 5.33 | +0.19 |
| Centre Democrats | 1,597 | 4.43 | -3.72 |
| Progress Party | 1,257 | 3.49 | -4.73 |
| Venstre | 1,202 | 3.34 | +1.12 |
| Left Socialists | 816 | 2.26 | -0.50 |
| Justice Party of Denmark | 672 | 1.87 | +0.21 |
| Christian People's Party | 430 | 1.19 | +0.35 |
| Communist Party of Denmark | 322 | 0.89 | -0.56 |
| Socialist Workers Party | 39 | 0.11 | +0.08 |
| Marxist–Leninists Party | 5 | 0.01 | New |
| Carsten Grøn-Nielsen | 4 | 0.01 | New |
| Mogens Nebelong | 2 | 0.01 | 0.00 |
| Poul Rasmussen | 0 | 0.00 | New |
| Total | 36,032 | | |

1981 Danish general election

| Parties | Vote | | |
| Parties | Votes | % | + / - |
|---|---|---|---|
| Social Democrats | 12,131 | 35.79 | -7.42 |
| Conservatives | 5,932 | 17.50 | +3.73 |
| Green Left | 5,468 | 16.13 | +8.25 |
| Progress Party | 2,786 | 8.22 | -1.63 |
| Centre Democrats | 2,761 | 8.15 | +4.91 |
| Social Liberals | 1,742 | 5.14 | -0.60 |
| Left Socialists | 937 | 2.76 | -1.96 |
| Venstre | 753 | 2.22 | -1.87 |
| Justice Party of Denmark | 564 | 1.66 | -1.65 |
| Communist Party of Denmark | 492 | 1.45 | -1.28 |
| Christian People's Party | 285 | 0.84 | -0.28 |
| Communist Workers Party | 29 | 0.09 | -0.26 |
| Socialist Workers Party | 10 | 0.03 | New |
| Mogens Nebelong | 2 | 0.01 | New |
| Total | 33,892 | | |

=== General elections in the 1970s ===
1979 Danish general election

| Parties | Vote | | |
| Parties | Votes | % | + / - |
|---|---|---|---|
| Social Democrats | 14,959 | 43.21 | +0.60 |
| Conservatives | 4,768 | 13.77 | +4.73 |
| Progress Party | 3,409 | 9.85 | -4.42 |
| Green Left | 2,728 | 7.88 | +2.50 |
| Social Liberals | 1,986 | 5.74 | +3.26 |
| Left Socialists | 1,633 | 4.72 | +1.70 |
| Venstre | 1,416 | 4.09 | +0.69 |
| Justice Party of Denmark | 1,145 | 3.31 | -0.82 |
| Centre Democrats | 1,121 | 3.24 | -4.52 |
| Communist Party of Denmark | 945 | 2.73 | -2.99 |
| Christian People's Party | 389 | 1.12 | -0.36 |
| Communist Workers Party | 122 | 0.35 | New |
| Total | 34,621 | | |

1977 Danish general election

| Parties | Vote | | |
| Parties | Votes | % | + / - |
|---|---|---|---|
| Social Democrats | 14,666 | 42.61 | +9.12 |
| Progress Party | 4,913 | 14.27 | -1.19 |
| Conservatives | 3,112 | 9.04 | +2.92 |
| Centre Democrats | 2,670 | 7.76 | +5.07 |
| Communist Party of Denmark | 1,969 | 5.72 | -0.80 |
| Green Left | 1,853 | 5.38 | -2.80 |
| Justice Party of Denmark | 1,422 | 4.13 | +2.30 |
| Venstre | 1,170 | 3.40 | -10.76 |
| Left Socialists | 1,038 | 3.02 | +0.99 |
| Social Liberals | 855 | 2.48 | -3.89 |
| Christian People's Party | 510 | 1.48 | -1.66 |
| Pensioners' Party | 237 | 0.69 | New |
| Otto Jensen | 6 | 0.02 | New |
| Poul Rasmussen | 0 | 0.00 | New |
| Total | 34,421 | | |

1975 Danish general election

| Parties | Vote | | |
| Parties | Votes | % | + / - |
|---|---|---|---|
| Social Democrats | 11,021 | 33.49 | +7.03 |
| Progress Party | 5,087 | 15.46 | -1.26 |
| Venstre | 4,661 | 14.16 | +10.33 |
| Green Left | 2,692 | 8.18 | -1.59 |
| Communist Party of Denmark | 2,146 | 6.52 | +0.64 |
| Social Liberals | 2,095 | 6.37 | -1.69 |
| Conservatives | 2,013 | 6.12 | -3.96 |
| Christian People's Party | 1,035 | 3.14 | +1.08 |
| Centre Democrats | 886 | 2.69 | -9.34 |
| Left Socialists | 668 | 2.03 | +0.24 |
| Justice Party of Denmark | 603 | 1.83 | -1.45 |
| J. G. Amdrejcak | 4 | 0.01 | New |
| Kai Clemmensen | 1 | 0.00 | New |
| Poul Friborg | 1 | 0.00 | New |
| Henning Glahn | 0 | 0.00 | New |
| Total | 32,913 | | |

1973 Danish general election

| Parties | Vote | | |
| Parties | Votes | % | + / - |
|---|---|---|---|
| Social Democrats | 8,797 | 26.46 | -14.79 |
| Progress Party | 5,560 | 16.72 | New |
| Centre Democrats | 4,000 | 12.03 | New |
| Conservatives | 3,350 | 10.08 | -10.47 |
| Green Left | 3,248 | 9.77 | -5.63 |
| Social Liberals | 2,678 | 8.06 | -3.29 |
| Communist Party of Denmark | 1,955 | 5.88 | +3.74 |
| Venstre | 1,273 | 3.83 | -0.83 |
| Justice Party of Denmark | 1,089 | 3.28 | +1.77 |
| Christian People's Party | 686 | 2.06 | +1.18 |
| Left Socialists | 596 | 1.79 | -0.28 |
| Erik Dissing | 13 | 0.04 | New |
| Total | 33,245 | | |

1971 Danish general election

| Parties | Vote | | |
| Parties | Votes | % | + / - |
|---|---|---|---|
| Social Democrats | 12,976 | 41.25 | +5.45 |
| Conservatives | 6,464 | 20.55 | -4.49 |
| Green Left | 4,845 | 15.40 | +5.11 |
| Social Liberals | 3,571 | 11.35 | -4.65 |
| Venstre | 1,466 | 4.66 | +0.11 |
| Communist Party of Denmark | 674 | 2.14 | +0.54 |
| Left Socialists | 651 | 2.07 | -1.93 |
| Justice Party of Denmark | 474 | 1.51 | +0.98 |
| Christian People's Party | 276 | 0.88 | New |
| Henning Berthelsen | 58 | 0.18 | New |
| Total | 31,455 | | |

=== General elections in the 1960s ===
1968 Danish general election

| Parties | Vote | | |
| Parties | Votes | % | + / - |
|---|---|---|---|
| Social Democrats | 11,383 | 35.80 | -2.23 |
| Conservatives | 7,962 | 25.04 | -0.71 |
| Social Liberals | 5,087 | 16.00 | +9.97 |
| Green Left | 3,273 | 10.29 | -8.05 |
| Venstre | 1,447 | 4.55 | -1.13 |
| Left Socialists | 1,273 | 4.00 | New |
| Liberal Centre | 602 | 1.89 | -2.01 |
| Communist Party of Denmark | 510 | 1.60 | +0.47 |
| Justice Party of Denmark | 168 | 0.53 | +0.10 |
| Independent Party | 93 | 0.29 | -0.42 |
| Thode Karlsen | 1 | 0.00 | 0.00 |
| Total | 31,798 | | |

1966 Danish general election

| Parties | Vote | | |
| Parties | Votes | % | + / - |
|---|---|---|---|
| Social Democrats | 12,601 | 38.03 | |
| Conservatives | 8,532 | 25.75 | |
| Green Left | 6,077 | 18.34 | |
| Social Liberals | 1,997 | 6.03 | |
| Venstre | 1,881 | 5.68 | |
| Liberal Centre | 1,292 | 3.90 | |
| Communist Party of Denmark | 376 | 1.13 | |
| Independent Party | 235 | 0.71 | |
| Justice Party of Denmark | 142 | 0.43 | |
| Thode Karlsen | 1 | 0.00 | |
| Total | 33,134 | | |

== European Parliament elections results ==
2024 European Parliament election in Denmark

| Parties | Vote | | |
| Parties | Votes | % | + / - |
|---|---|---|---|
| Social Democrats | 4,126 | 18.17 | -5.59 |
| Green Left | 4,037 | 17.78 | +4.72 |
| Venstre | 2,560 | 11.27 | -7.90 |
| Conservatives | 2,165 | 9.53 | +3.24 |
| Danish People's Party | 1,911 | 8.42 | -5.26 |
| Social Liberals | 1,666 | 7.34 | -2.06 |
| Moderates | 1,640 | 7.22 | New |
| Liberal Alliance | 1,574 | 6.93 | +5.08 |
| Red–Green Alliance | 1,388 | 6.11 | +0.99 |
| Denmark Democrats | 1,092 | 4.81 | New |
| The Alternative | 547 | 2.41 | -0.16 |
| Total | 22,706 | | |

2019 European Parliament election in Denmark

| Parties | Vote | | |
| Parties | Votes | % | + / - |
|---|---|---|---|
| Social Democrats | 6,274 | 23.76 | +4.81 |
| Venstre | 5,063 | 19.17 | +7.69 |
| Danish People's Party | 3,612 | 13.68 | -21.53 |
| Green Left | 3,448 | 13.06 | +3.55 |
| Social Liberals | 2,482 | 9.40 | +3.83 |
| Conservatives | 1,661 | 6.29 | -1.70 |
| People's Movement against the EU | 1,351 | 5.12 | -3.58 |
| Red–Green Alliance | 1,351 | 5.12 | New |
| The Alternative | 679 | 2.57 | New |
| Liberal Alliance | 488 | 1.85 | -0.75 |
| Total | 26,409 | | |

2014 European Parliament election in Denmark

| Parties | Vote | | |
| Parties | Votes | % | + / - |
|---|---|---|---|
| Danish People's Party | 7,773 | 35.21 | +13.31 |
| Social Democrats | 4,183 | 18.95 | -1.56 |
| Venstre | 2,535 | 11.48 | -4.28 |
| Green Left | 2,100 | 9.51 | -6.02 |
| People's Movement against the EU | 1,921 | 8.70 | -0.47 |
| Conservatives | 1,764 | 7.99 | -2.45 |
| Social Liberals | 1,229 | 5.57 | +1.57 |
| Liberal Alliance | 573 | 2.60 | +2.12 |
| Total | 22,078 | | |

2009 European Parliament election in Denmark

| Parties | Vote | | |
| Parties | Votes | % | + / - |
|---|---|---|---|
| Danish People's Party | 4,955 | 21.90 | +11.67 |
| Social Democrats | 4,640 | 20.51 | -15.44 |
| Venstre | 3,566 | 15.76 | +3.67 |
| Green Left | 3,513 | 15.53 | +7.69 |
| Conservatives | 2,362 | 10.44 | -2.61 |
| People's Movement against the EU | 2,074 | 9.17 | +2.93 |
| Social Liberals | 905 | 4.00 | -0.71 |
| June Movement | 503 | 2.22 | -7.11 |
| Liberal Alliance | 108 | 0.48 | New |
| Total | 22,626 | | |

2004 European Parliament election in Denmark

| Parties | Vote | | |
| Parties | Votes | % | + / - |
|---|---|---|---|
| Social Democrats | 6,365 | 35.95 | +19.03 |
| Conservatives | 2,310 | 13.05 | +4.46 |
| Venstre | 2,140 | 12.09 | -4.05 |
| Danish People's Party | 1,812 | 10.23 | +0.31 |
| June Movement | 1,651 | 9.33 | -9.19 |
| Green Left | 1,388 | 7.84 | +0.18 |
| People's Movement against the EU | 1,105 | 6.24 | -2.62 |
| Social Liberals | 834 | 4.71 | -3.79 |
| Christian Democrats | 99 | 0.56 | -0.62 |
| Total | 17,704 | | |

1999 European Parliament election in Denmark

| Parties | Vote | | |
| Parties | Votes | % | + / - |
|---|---|---|---|
| June Movement | 3,695 | 18.52 | +0.28 |
| Social Democrats | 3,376 | 16.92 | +0.78 |
| Venstre | 3,220 | 16.14 | +5.59 |
| Danish People's Party | 1,979 | 9.92 | New |
| People's Movement against the EU | 1,767 | 8.86 | -5.13 |
| Conservatives | 1,714 | 8.59 | -8.59 |
| Social Liberals | 1,695 | 8.50 | -0.31 |
| Green Left | 1,528 | 7.66 | -2.83 |
| Centre Democrats | 739 | 3.70 | +2.80 |
| Christian Democrats | 236 | 1.18 | +0.75 |
| Progress Party | 88 | 0.44 | -2.83 |
| Total | 19,949 | | |

1994 European Parliament election in Denmark

| Parties | Vote | | |
| Parties | Votes | % | + / - |
|---|---|---|---|
| June Movement | 3,951 | 18.24 | New |
| Conservatives | 3,722 | 17.18 | +3.54 |
| Social Democrats | 3,496 | 16.14 | -7.76 |
| People's Movement against the EU | 3,030 | 13.99 | -12.95 |
| Venstre | 2,286 | 10.55 | +3.10 |
| Green Left | 2,273 | 10.49 | -1.17 |
| Social Liberals | 1,908 | 8.81 | +6.89 |
| Progress Party | 708 | 3.27 | -1.06 |
| Centre Democrats | 196 | 0.90 | -8.07 |
| Christian Democrats | 94 | 0.43 | -0.76 |
| Total | 21,664 | | |

1989 European Parliament election in Denmark

| Parties | Vote | | |
| Parties | Votes | % | + / - |
|---|---|---|---|
| People's Movement against the EU | 5,124 | 26.94 | -1.54 |
| Social Democrats | 4,547 | 23.90 | +3.52 |
| Conservatives | 2,595 | 13.64 | -7.00 |
| Green Left | 2,219 | 11.66 | -3.32 |
| Centre Democrats | 1,706 | 8.97 | +3.31 |
| Venstre | 1,417 | 7.45 | +5.16 |
| Progress Party | 824 | 4.33 | +1.09 |
| Social Liberals | 365 | 1.92 | -0.43 |
| Christian Democrats | 226 | 1.19 | +0.01 |
| Total | 19,023 | | |

1984 European Parliament election in Denmark

| Parties | Vote | |
| Parties | Votes | % |
|---|---|---|
| People's Movement against the EU | 6,270 | 28.48 |
| Conservatives | 4,545 | 20.64 |
| Social Democrats | 4,487 | 20.38 |
| Green Left | 3,299 | 14.98 |
| Centre Democrats | 1,247 | 5.66 |
| Progress Party | 713 | 3.24 |
| Social Liberals | 517 | 2.35 |
| Venstre | 505 | 2.29 |
| Christian Democrats | 259 | 1.18 |
| Left Socialists | 177 | 0.80 |
| Total | 22,019 | |

== Referendums ==
2022 Danish European Union opt-out referendum

| Option | Votes | % |
|---|---|---|
| ✓ YES | 17,316 | 64.51 |
| X NO | 9,528 | 35.49 |

2015 Danish European Union opt-out referendum

| Option | Votes | % |
|---|---|---|
| X NO | 17,621 | 59.22 |
| ✓ YES | 12,133 | 40.78 |

2014 Danish Unified Patent Court membership referendum

| Option | Votes | % |
|---|---|---|
| ✓ YES | 12,390 | 57.49 |
| X NO | 9,161 | 42.51 |

2009 Danish Act of Succession referendum

| Option | Votes | % |
|---|---|---|
| ✓ YES | 17,556 | 84.14 |
| X NO | 3,309 | 15.86 |

2000 Danish euro referendum

| Option | Votes | % |
|---|---|---|
| X NO | 20,673 | 58.61 |
| ✓ YES | 14,597 | 41.39 |

1998 Danish Amsterdam Treaty referendum

| Option | Votes | % |
|---|---|---|
| X NO | 15,905 | 51.52 |
| ✓ YES | 14,966 | 48.48 |

1993 Danish Maastricht Treaty referendum

| Option | Votes | % |
|---|---|---|
| ✓ YES | 17,874 | 50.20 |
| X NO | 17,735 | 49.80 |

1992 Danish Maastricht Treaty referendum

| Option | Votes | % |
|---|---|---|
| X NO | 19,558 | 56.57 |
| ✓ YES | 15,013 | 43.43 |

1986 Danish Single European Act referendum

| Option | Votes | % |
|---|---|---|
| X NO | 17,456 | 55.88 |
| ✓ YES | 13,784 | 44.12 |

1972 Danish European Communities membership referendum

| Option | Votes | % |
|---|---|---|
| ✓ YES | 17,750 | 52.61 |
| X NO | 15,986 | 47.39 |
