= Randers North (nomination district) =

Constituency in East Jutland, Denmark

- Randers Nord
- Nomination district constituency for the Folketing
- Location of Randers North within East Jutland

- Location of East Jutland within Denmark
- Municipalities: Randers
- Constituency: East Jutland
- Electorate: 35,669 (2022)

Current constituency
- Created: 2007

Randers North nominating district is one of the 92 nominating districts that was created for Danish elections following the 2007 municipal reform. It is one of the two nomination districts in Randers Municipality, the other being Randers South.

In general elections, the district tends to vote close to the national result, when looking at the voter split between the two blocs.

== General elections results ==
=== General elections in the 2020s ===
2022 Danish general election

| Parties | Vote | | |
| Parties | Votes | % | + / - |
|---|---|---|---|
| Social Democrats | 10,395 | 36.27 | +1.55 |
| Venstre | 3,755 | 13.10 | -11.70 |
| Denmark Democrats | 3,115 | 10.87 | New |
| Liberal Alliance | 2,317 | 8.08 | +6.28 |
| Moderates | 1,801 | 6.28 | New |
| Green Left | 1,729 | 6.03 | -0.25 |
| New Right | 1,427 | 4.98 | +2.97 |
| Danish People's Party | 971 | 3.39 | -6.69 |
| Conservatives | 959 | 3.35 | -0.88 |
| Red–Green Alliance | 892 | 3.11 | -1.76 |
| Social Liberals | 548 | 1.91 | -3.46 |
| The Alternative | 436 | 1.52 | +0.10 |
| Christian Democrats | 172 | 0.60 | -1.22 |
| Independent Greens | 122 | 0.43 | New |
| Jesper Antonsen | 21 | 0.07 | New |
| Chresten H. Ibsen | 4 | 0.01 | -0.06 |
| Total | 28,664 | | |

=== General elections in the 2010s ===
2019 Danish general election

| Parties | Vote | | |
| Parties | Votes | % | + / - |
|---|---|---|---|
| Social Democrats | 9,918 | 34.72 | +1.53 |
| Venstre | 7,084 | 24.80 | +5.59 |
| Danish People's Party | 2,881 | 10.08 | -13.74 |
| Green Left | 1,793 | 6.28 | +3.16 |
| Social Liberals | 1,534 | 5.37 | +3.07 |
| Red–Green Alliance | 1,392 | 4.87 | -1.91 |
| Conservatives | 1,208 | 4.23 | +1.97 |
| New Right | 575 | 2.01 | New |
| Stram Kurs | 555 | 1.94 | New |
| Christian Democrats | 519 | 1.82 | +1.03 |
| Liberal Alliance | 513 | 1.80 | -3.92 |
| The Alternative | 406 | 1.42 | -1.22 |
| Klaus Riskær Pedersen Party | 170 | 0.60 | New |
| Chresten H. Ibsen | 19 | 0.07 | New |
| Hans Schultz | 1 | 0.00 | New |
| Total | 28,568 | | |

2015 Danish general election

| Parties | Vote | | |
| Parties | Votes | % | + / - |
|---|---|---|---|
| Social Democrats | 9,741 | 33.19 | -3.36 |
| Danish People's Party | 6,989 | 23.82 | +11.70 |
| Venstre | 5,638 | 19.21 | -8.41 |
| Red–Green Alliance | 1,990 | 6.78 | +2.61 |
| Liberal Alliance | 1,679 | 5.72 | +2.44 |
| Green Left | 916 | 3.12 | -4.41 |
| The Alternative | 774 | 2.64 | New |
| Social Liberals | 676 | 2.30 | -3.10 |
| Conservatives | 664 | 2.26 | -0.48 |
| Christian Democrats | 232 | 0.79 | +0.22 |
| Yahya Hassan | 37 | 0.13 | New |
| Peter Ymer Nielsen | 6 | 0.02 | New |
| Poul Gundersen | 4 | 0.01 | New |
| Total | 29,346 | | |

2011 Danish general election

| Parties | Vote | | |
| Parties | Votes | % | + / - |
|---|---|---|---|
| Social Democrats | 10,966 | 36.55 | +1.66 |
| Venstre | 8,286 | 27.62 | -0.25 |
| Danish People's Party | 3,635 | 12.12 | -2.61 |
| Green Left | 2,259 | 7.53 | -1.89 |
| Social Liberals | 1,619 | 5.40 | +2.34 |
| Red–Green Alliance | 1,250 | 4.17 | +3.25 |
| Liberal Alliance | 983 | 3.28 | +1.50 |
| Conservatives | 822 | 2.74 | -3.87 |
| Christian Democrats | 171 | 0.57 | -0.13 |
| Janus Kramer Møller | 11 | 0.04 | New |
| Ibrahim Gøkhan | 2 | 0.01 | New |
| Total | 30,004 | | |

=== General elections in the 2000s ===
2007 Danish general election

| Parties | Vote | | |
| Parties | Votes | % | + / - |
|---|---|---|---|
| Social Democrats | 10,215 | 34.89 | |
| Venstre | 8,159 | 27.87 | |
| Danish People's Party | 4,313 | 14.73 | |
| Green Left | 2,759 | 9.42 | |
| Conservatives | 1,935 | 6.61 | |
| Social Liberals | 897 | 3.06 | |
| New Alliance | 522 | 1.78 | |
| Red–Green Alliance | 268 | 0.92 | |
| Christian Democrats | 204 | 0.70 | |
| Jes Krogh | 2 | 0.01 | |
| Total | 29,274 | | |

== European Parliament elections results ==
2024 European Parliament election in Denmark

| Parties | Vote | | |
| Parties | Votes | % | + / - |
|---|---|---|---|
| Social Democrats | 3,541 | 20.10 | -9.21 |
| Green Left | 2,495 | 14.16 | +4.66 |
| Venstre | 2,464 | 13.99 | -9.95 |
| Denmark Democrats | 2,125 | 12.06 | New |
| Danish People's Party | 1,614 | 9.16 | -3.87 |
| Conservatives | 1,305 | 7.41 | +3.03 |
| Liberal Alliance | 1,200 | 6.81 | +4.66 |
| Moderates | 1,059 | 6.01 | New |
| Red–Green Alliance | 802 | 4.55 | +0.20 |
| Social Liberals | 690 | 3.92 | -2.78 |
| The Alternative | 322 | 1.83 | -0.29 |
| Total | 17,617 | | |

2019 European Parliament election in Denmark

| Parties | Vote | | |
| Parties | Votes | % | + / - |
|---|---|---|---|
| Social Democrats | 5,969 | 29.31 | +7.40 |
| Venstre | 4,875 | 23.94 | +7.15 |
| Danish People's Party | 2,653 | 13.03 | -20.78 |
| Green Left | 1,935 | 9.50 | +2.27 |
| Social Liberals | 1,364 | 6.70 | +2.95 |
| People's Movement against the EU | 921 | 4.52 | -3.28 |
| Conservatives | 892 | 4.38 | -2.33 |
| Red–Green Alliance | 885 | 4.35 | New |
| Liberal Alliance | 437 | 2.15 | +0.13 |
| The Alternative | 432 | 2.12 | New |
| Total | 20,363 | | |

2014 European Parliament election in Denmark

| Parties | Vote | | |
| Parties | Votes | % | + / - |
|---|---|---|---|
| Danish People's Party | 5,982 | 33.81 | +14.12 |
| Social Democrats | 3,876 | 21.91 | -6.75 |
| Venstre | 2,970 | 16.79 | -2.86 |
| People's Movement against the EU | 1,380 | 7.80 | +2.46 |
| Green Left | 1,279 | 7.23 | -3.97 |
| Conservatives | 1,187 | 6.71 | -3.72 |
| Social Liberals | 663 | 3.75 | +1.18 |
| Liberal Alliance | 357 | 2.02 | +1.65 |
| Total | 17,694 | | |

2009 European Parliament election in Denmark

| Parties | Vote | | |
| Parties | Votes | % | + / - |
|---|---|---|---|
| Social Democrats | 5,470 | 28.66 | |
| Danish People's Party | 3,758 | 19.69 | |
| Venstre | 3,750 | 19.65 | |
| Green Left | 2,138 | 11.20 | |
| Conservatives | 1,990 | 10.43 | |
| People's Movement against the EU | 1,019 | 5.34 | |
| Social Liberals | 490 | 2.57 | |
| June Movement | 401 | 2.10 | |
| Liberal Alliance | 71 | 0.37 | |
| Total | 19,087 | | |

== Referendums ==
2022 Danish European Union opt-out referendum

| Option | Votes | % |
|---|---|---|
| ✓ YES | 13,466 | 61.49 |
| X NO | 8,435 | 38.51 |

2015 Danish European Union opt-out referendum

| Option | Votes | % |
|---|---|---|
| X NO | 14,496 | 59.93 |
| ✓ YES | 9,693 | 40.07 |

2014 Danish Unified Patent Court membership referendum

| Option | Votes | % |
|---|---|---|
| ✓ YES | 10,092 | 59.95 |
| X NO | 6,741 | 40.05 |

2009 Danish Act of Succession referendum

| Option | Votes | % |
|---|---|---|
| ✓ YES | 15,534 | 85.30 |
| X NO | 2,676 | 14.70 |
