= Greve (nomination district) =

Danish nominating district

- Greve
- Nomination district constituency for the Folketing
- Location of Greve within Zealand

- Location of Zealand within Denmark
- Municipalities: Greve; Solrød
- Constituency: Zealand
- Electorate: 52,677 (2022)

Current constituency
- Created: 2007

Greve nominating district is one of the 92 nominating districts that was created for Danish elections following the 2007 municipal reform. It consists of Greve and Solrød municipality.

In general elections, the district is a strong area for parties commonly associated with the blue bloc.

== General elections results ==
=== General elections in the 2020s ===
2022 Danish general election

Parties	Vote		
Parties	Votes	%	+ / -
Social Democrats	11,176	25.25	+1.63
Venstre	8,222	18.57	-12.05
Moderates	5,784	13.07	New
Liberal Alliance	4,222	9.54	+6.90
Green Left	3,220	7.27	+0.48
Denmark Democrats	2,715	6.13	New
Conservatives	2,265	5.12	-2.14
Danish People's Party	1,742	3.93	-6.62
New Right	1,653	3.73	+0.94
Social Liberals	1,201	2.71	-4.24
Red–Green Alliance	936	2.11	-1.34
The Alternative	560	1.26	-0.20
Independent Greens	434	0.98	New
Christian Democrats	102	0.23	-0.56
Lisa Sofia Larsson	19	0.04	New
Rasmus Paludan	19	0.04	New
Total	44,270		

=== General elections in the 2010s ===
2019 Danish general election

Parties	Vote		
Parties	Votes	%	+ / -
Venstre	13,752	30.62	+6.12
Social Democrats	10,606	23.62	-0.23
Danish People's Party	4,739	10.55	-15.42
Conservatives	3,260	7.26	+4.20
Social Liberals	3,123	6.95	+3.55
Green Left	3,048	6.79	+4.05
Red–Green Alliance	1,549	3.45	-1.27
New Right	1,255	2.79	New
Liberal Alliance	1,184	2.64	-6.41
Stram Kurs	995	2.22	New
The Alternative	654	1.46	-0.86
Klaus Riskær Pedersen Party	386	0.86	New
Christian Democrats	355	0.79	+0.45
Pinki Karin Yvonne Jensen	6	0.01	New
Total	44,912		

2015 Danish general election

Parties	Vote		
Parties	Votes	%	+ / -
Danish People's Party	11,499	25.97	+9.40
Venstre	10,847	24.50	-9.54
Social Democrats	10,561	23.85	+4.26
Liberal Alliance	4,009	9.05	+3.20
Red–Green Alliance	2,091	4.72	+0.95
Social Liberals	1,506	3.40	-4.31
Conservatives	1,353	3.06	-2.77
Green Left	1,215	2.74	-3.62
The Alternative	1,028	2.32	New
Christian Democrats	149	0.34	+0.08
Aamer Ahmad	19	0.04	New
Michael Christiansen	1	0.00	New
Bent A. Jespersen	0	0.00	0.00
Total	44,278		

2011 Danish general election

Parties	Vote		
Parties	Votes	%	+ / -
Venstre	15,049	34.04	-1.44
Social Democrats	8,662	19.59	-1.60
Danish People's Party	7,327	16.57	-0.38
Social Liberals	3,410	7.71	+4.06
Green Left	2,810	6.36	-1.96
Liberal Alliance	2,586	5.85	+2.56
Conservatives	2,576	5.83	-3.90
Red–Green Alliance	1,668	3.77	+2.74
Christian Democrats	116	0.26	-0.10
Johan Isbrandt Haulik	3	0.01	New
Bent A. Jespersen	1	0.00	New
Peter Lotinga	1	0.00	New
Total	44,209		

=== General elections in the 2000s ===
2007 Danish general election

Parties	Vote		
Parties	Votes	%	+ / -
Venstre	15,390	35.48	
Social Democrats	9,193	21.19	
Danish People's Party	7,354	16.95	
Conservatives	4,221	9.73	
Green Left	3,608	8.32	
Social Liberals	1,584	3.65	
New Alliance	1,425	3.29	
Red–Green Alliance	445	1.03	
Christian Democrats	155	0.36	
Total	43,375		

== European Parliament elections results ==
2024 European Parliament election in Denmark

Parties	Vote		
Parties	Votes	%	+ / -
Venstre	5,635	18.91	-10.12
Social Democrats	4,805	16.13	-5.00
Green Left	3,619	12.15	+3.32
Conservatives	3,041	10.21	+3.63
Liberal Alliance	2,834	9.51	+7.14
Danish People's Party	2,538	8.52	-5.53
Moderates	2,396	8.04	New
Social Liberals	1,728	5.80	-2.78
Denmark Democrats	1,541	5.17	New
Red–Green Alliance	1,111	3.73	+0.09
The Alternative	546	1.83	-0.25
Total	29,794		

2019 European Parliament election in Denmark

Parties	Vote		
Parties	Votes	%	+ / -
Venstre	10,091	29.03	+8.98
Social Democrats	7,345	21.13	+4.46
Danish People's Party	4,885	14.05	-20.18
Green Left	3,071	8.83	+2.27
Social Liberals	2,981	8.58	+3.77
Conservatives	2,288	6.58	-2.26
People's Movement against the EU	1,286	3.70	-1.73
Red–Green Alliance	1,267	3.64	New
Liberal Alliance	824	2.37	-1.05
The Alternative	723	2.08	New
Total	34,761		

2014 European Parliament election in Denmark

Parties	Vote		
Parties	Votes	%	+ / -
Danish People's Party	10,073	34.23	+12.19
Venstre	5,900	20.05	-4.36
Social Democrats	4,905	16.67	-1.74
Conservatives	2,603	8.84	-3.54
Green Left	1,930	6.56	-4.27
People's Movement against the EU	1,597	5.43	-0.50
Social Liberals	1,417	4.81	+1.38
Liberal Alliance	1,006	3.42	+2.82
Total	29,431		

2009 European Parliament election in Denmark

Parties	Vote		
Parties	Votes	%	+ / -
Venstre	7,240	24.41	
Danish People's Party	6,535	22.04	
Social Democrats	5,460	18.41	
Conservatives	3,671	12.38	
Green Left	3,213	10.83	
People's Movement against the EU	1,759	5.93	
Social Liberals	1,017	3.43	
June Movement	583	1.97	
Liberal Alliance	179	0.60	
Total	29,657		

== Referendums ==
2022 Danish European Union opt-out referendum

Option	Votes	%
✓ YES	23,601	67.74
X NO	11,240	32.26

2015 Danish European Union opt-out referendum

Option	Votes	%
X NO	20,041	53.10
✓ YES	17,700	46.90

2014 Danish Unified Patent Court membership referendum

Option	Votes	%
✓ YES	18,549	64.16
X NO	10,361	35.84

2009 Danish Act of Succession referendum

Option	Votes	%
✓ YES	24,158	86.18
X NO	3,875	13.82
