= City of Esbjerg (nomination district) =

Nomination District

- Esbjerg By
- Nomination district constituency for the Folketing
- Location of City of Esbjerg within South Jutland

- Location of South Jutland within Denmark
- Municipalities: Esbjerg; Fanø
- Constituency: South Jutland
- Electorate: 47,777 (2022)

Current constituency
- Created: 2007

City of Esbjerg nominating district is one of the 92 nominating districts that was created for Danish elections following the 2007 municipal reform. It is one of the two nomination districts in Esbjerg Municipality, the other being Greater Esbjerg, and also includes Fanø Municipality.

In general elections, the results in the district has been fairly close to the national result, when looking at the split vote between the two blocs.

== General elections results ==
=== General elections in the 2020s ===
2022 Danish general election

Parties	Vote		
Parties	Votes	%	+ / -
Social Democrats	12,465	33.52	+2.64
Venstre	4,518	12.15	-9.76
Denmark Democrats	3,155	8.48	New
Moderates	2,979	8.01	New
Liberal Alliance	2,946	7.92	+5.84
Green Left	2,739	7.36	+1.18
Conservatives	1,927	5.18	+0.48
New Right	1,919	5.16	+1.34
Red–Green Alliance	1,406	3.78	-3.20
Danish People's Party	1,101	2.96	-7.97
Social Liberals	939	2.52	-3.46
The Alternative	619	1.66	-0.38
Independent Greens	241	0.65	New
Christian Democrats	188	0.51	-0.98
Kent Nielsen	46	0.12	New
Kenneth Vestergaard	4	0.01	New
Total	37,192		

=== General elections in the 2010s ===
2019 Danish general election

Parties	Vote		
Parties	Votes	%	+ / -
Social Democrats	11,785	30.88	+2.81
Venstre	8,360	21.91	+3.64
Danish People's Party	4,173	10.93	-15.23
Red–Green Alliance	2,663	6.98	-2.11
Green Left	2,359	6.18	+2.46
Social Liberals	2,283	5.98	+3.15
Conservatives	1,792	4.70	+2.91
New Right	1,457	3.82	New
Stram Kurs	826	2.16	New
Liberal Alliance	794	2.08	-4.56
The Alternative	779	2.04	-0.67
Christian Democrats	569	1.49	+0.76
Klaus Riskær Pedersen Party	307	0.80	New
Michael Thomsen	17	0.04	New
Total	38,164		

2015 Danish general election

Parties	Vote		
Parties	Votes	%	+ / -
Social Democrats	10,998	28.07	-1.75
Danish People's Party	10,251	26.16	+12.84
Venstre	7,158	18.27	-8.57
Red–Green Alliance	3,560	9.09	+2.58
Liberal Alliance	2,603	6.64	+2.86
Green Left	1,457	3.72	-6.32
Social Liberals	1,107	2.83	-3.29
The Alternative	1,061	2.71	New
Conservatives	701	1.79	-1.04
Christian Democrats	287	0.73	+0.04
Total	39,183		

2011 Danish general election

Parties	Vote		
Parties	Votes	%	+ / -
Social Democrats	11,994	29.82	-1.01
Venstre	10,797	26.84	+0.84
Danish People's Party	5,356	13.32	-2.14
Green Left	4,038	10.04	-4.52
Red–Green Alliance	2,619	6.51	+5.24
Social Liberals	2,462	6.12	+3.31
Liberal Alliance	1,519	3.78	+2.04
Conservatives	1,139	2.83	-3.81
Christian Democrats	277	0.69	0.00
Niesl-Aage Bjerre	13	0.03	New
Jørn Bjorholm	6	0.01	New
Total	40,220		

=== General elections in the 2000s ===
2007 Danish general election

Parties	Vote		
Parties	Votes	%	+ / -
Social Democrats	12,241	30.83	
Venstre	10,322	26.00	
Danish People's Party	6,136	15.46	
Green Left	5,780	14.56	
Conservatives	2,637	6.64	
Social Liberals	1,114	2.81	
New Alliance	691	1.74	
Red–Green Alliance	505	1.27	
Christian Democrats	274	0.69	
Total	39,700		

== European Parliament elections results ==
2024 European Parliament election in Denmark

Parties	Vote		
Parties	Votes	%	+ / -
Social Democrats	4,539	19.97	-5.19
Venstre	3,673	16.16	-5.08
Green Left	3,410	15.00	+4.53
Liberal Alliance	1,906	8.39	+5.77
Danish People's Party	1,888	8.31	-6.06
Conservatives	1,830	8.05	+3.32
Denmark Democrats	1,723	7.58	New
Red–Green Alliance	1,216	5.35	-0.8
Social Liberals	1,041	4.58	-2.59
Moderates	1,037	4.56	New
The Alternative	464	2.04	-0.68
Total	22,727		

2019 European Parliament election in Denmark

Parties	Vote		
Parties	Votes	%	+ / -
Social Democrats	6,941	25.16	+4.53
Venstre	5,858	21.24	+4.64
Danish People's Party	3,964	14.37	-16.75
Green Left	2,889	10.47	+1.68
Social Liberals	1,978	7.17	+3.41
Red–Green Alliance	1,696	6.15	New
People's Movement against the EU	1,480	5.37	-5.08
Conservatives	1,306	4.73	-1.11
The Alternative	749	2.72	New
Liberal Alliance	722	2.62	-0.21
Total	27,583		

2014 European Parliament election in Denmark

Parties	Vote		
Parties	Votes	%	+ / -
Danish People's Party	7,354	31.12	+14.69
Social Democrats	4,874	20.63	-5.88
Venstre	3,922	16.60	-2.42
People's Movement against the EU	2,469	10.45	+1.17
Green Left	2,076	8.79	-6.45
Conservatives	1,379	5.84	-2.63
Social Liberals	888	3.76	+0.88
Liberal Alliance	668	2.83	+2.45
Total	23,630		

2009 European Parliament election in Denmark

Parties	Vote		
Parties	Votes	%	+ / -
Social Democrats	6,408	26.51	
Venstre	4,597	19.02	
Danish People's Party	3,970	16.43	
Green Left	3,684	15.24	
People's Movement against the EU	2,244	9.28	
Conservatives	2,046	8.47	
Social Liberals	696	2.88	
June Movement	432	1.79	
Liberal Alliance	93	0.38	
Total	24,170		

== Referendums ==
2022 Danish European Union opt-out referendum

Option	Votes	%
✓ YES	16,859	59.06
X NO	11,686	40.94

2015 Danish European Union opt-out referendum

Option	Votes	%
X NO	20,118	61.90
✓ YES	12,376	38.10

2014 Danish Unified Patent Court membership referendum

Option	Votes	%
✓ YES	12,861	55.20
X NO	10,437	44.80

2009 Danish Act of Succession referendum

Option	Votes	%
✓ YES	18,607	82.92
X NO	3,832	17.08
