= Greater Esbjerg (nomination district) =

- Esbjerg Omegn
- Nomination district constituency for the Folketing
- Location of Greater Esbjerg within South Jutland

- Location of South Jutland within Denmark
- Municipalities: Esbjerg
- Constituency: South Jutland
- Electorate: 40,713 (2022)

Current constituency
- Created: 2007

Greater Esbjerg nominating district is one of the 92 nominating districts that was created for Danish elections following the 2007 municipal reform. It is one of the two nomination districts in Esbjerg Municipality, the other being City of Esbjerg.

In general elections, parties commonly associated with the blue bloc has always received more votes.

== General elections results ==
=== General elections in the 2020s ===
2022 Danish general election

Parties	Vote		
Parties	Votes	%	+ / -
Social Democrats	9,505	28.12	+1.77
Venstre	5,864	17.35	-13.05
Denmark Democrats	3,875	11.46	New
Moderates	3,253	9.62	New
Liberal Alliance	2,782	8.23	+6.13
New Right	2,110	6.24	+2.18
Green Left	1,993	5.90	+0.67
Conservatives	1,565	4.63	-0.76
Danish People's Party	871	2.58	-9.12
Social Liberals	693	2.05	-2.82
Red–Green Alliance	648	1.92	-2.11
The Alternative	392	1.16	-0.45
Christian Democrats	192	0.57	-1.16
Independent Greens	50	0.15	New
Kent Nielsen	10	0.03	New
Kenneth Vestergaard	3	0.01	New
Total	33,806		

=== General elections in the 2010s ===
2019 Danish general election

Parties	Vote		
Parties	Votes	%	+ / -
Venstre	10,285	30.40	+4.29
Social Democrats	8,913	26.35	+3.01
Danish People's Party	3,958	11.70	-14.61
Conservatives	1,825	5.39	+3.10
Green Left	1,768	5.23	+1.93
Social Liberals	1,647	4.87	+2.27
New Right	1,375	4.06	New
Red–Green Alliance	1,364	4.03	-1.35
Liberal Alliance	711	2.10	-5.22
Christian Democrats	585	1.73	+0.87
Stram Kurs	574	1.70	New
The Alternative	543	1.61	-0.88
Klaus Riskær Pedersen Party	264	0.78	New
Michael Thomsen	17	0.05	New
Total	33,829		

2015 Danish general election

Parties	Vote		
Parties	Votes	%	+ / -
Danish People's Party	9,027	26.31	+13.42
Venstre	8,960	26.11	-11.01
Social Democrats	8,009	23.34	+0.24
Liberal Alliance	2,511	7.32	+2.45
Red–Green Alliance	1,845	5.38	+1.51
Green Left	1,134	3.30	-4.22
Social Liberals	893	2.60	-4.01
The Alternative	853	2.49	New
Conservatives	787	2.29	-0.96
Christian Democrats	295	0.86	+0.12
Total	34,314		

2011 Danish general election

Parties	Vote		
Parties	Votes	%	+ / -
Venstre	12,952	37.12	-0.76
Social Democrats	8,059	23.10	-0.28
Danish People's Party	4,498	12.89	-0.93
Green Left	2,623	7.52	-3.26
Social Liberals	2,308	6.61	+3.16
Liberal Alliance	1,699	4.87	+3.27
Red–Green Alliance	1,349	3.87	+3.08
Conservatives	1,134	3.25	-4.38
Christian Democrats	259	0.74	+0.07
Jørn Bjorholm	6	0.02	New
Niesl-Aage Bjerre	4	0.01	New
Total	34,891		

=== General elections in the 2000s ===
2007 Danish general election

Parties	Vote		
Parties	Votes	%	+ / -
Venstre	12,832	37.88	
Social Democrats	7,919	23.38	
Danish People's Party	4,681	13.82	
Green Left	3,652	10.78	
Conservatives	2,583	7.63	
Social Liberals	1,169	3.45	
New Alliance	542	1.60	
Red–Green Alliance	269	0.79	
Christian Democrats	226	0.67	
Total	33,873		

== European Parliament elections results ==
2024 European Parliament election in Denmark

Parties	Vote		
Parties	Votes	%	+ / -
Venstre	4,882	22.50	-7.97
Social Democrats	3,560	16.40	-5.54
Green Left	2,607	12.01	+2.84
Denmark Democrats	2,336	10.76	New
Liberal Alliance	2,059	9.49	+6.33
Conservatives	1,733	7.99	+2.73
Danish People's Party	1,588	7.32	-7.21
Moderates	1,140	5.25	New
Social Liberals	926	4.27	-2.03
Red–Green Alliance	573	2.64	-1.03
The Alternative	298	1.37	-0.72
Total	21,702		

2019 European Parliament election in Denmark

Parties	Vote		
Parties	Votes	%	+ / -
Venstre	7,734	30.47	+6.22
Social Democrats	5,570	21.94	+4.64
Danish People's Party	3,689	14.53	-14.22
Green Left	2,328	9.17	+1.15
Social Liberals	1,598	6.30	+2.49
Conservatives	1,336	5.26	-3.30
Red–Green Alliance	931	3.67	New
People's Movement against the EU	866	3.41	-3.14
Liberal Alliance	802	3.16	+0.39
The Alternative	530	2.09	New
Total	25,384		

2014 European Parliament election in Denmark

Parties	Vote		
Parties	Votes	%	+ / -
Danish People's Party	5,936	28.75	+13.45
Venstre	5,007	24.25	-4.29
Social Democrats	3,572	17.30	-3.40
Conservatives	1,767	8.56	-2.71
Green Left	1,656	8.02	-5.26
People's Movement against the EU	1,352	6.55	+0.76
Social Liberals	787	3.81	+0.98
Liberal Alliance	571	2.77	+2.33
Total	20,648		

2009 European Parliament election in Denmark

Parties	Vote		
Parties	Votes	%	+ / -
Venstre	6,361	28.54	
Social Democrats	4,614	20.70	
Danish People's Party	3,410	15.30	
Green Left	2,960	13.28	
Conservatives	2,511	11.27	
People's Movement against the EU	1,290	5.79	
Social Liberals	631	2.83	
June Movement	413	1.85	
Liberal Alliance	98	0.44	
Total	22,288		

== Referendums ==
2022 Danish European Union opt-out referendum

Option	Votes	%
✓ YES	16,651	63.84
X NO	9,432	36.16

2015 Danish European Union opt-out referendum

Option	Votes	%
X NO	15,742	54.88
✓ YES	12,940	45.12

2014 Danish Unified Patent Court membership referendum

Option	Votes	%
✓ YES	12,963	64.27
X NO	7,206	35.73

2009 Danish Act of Succession referendum

Option	Votes	%
✓ YES	18,296	86.13
X NO	2,947	13.87
