= Guldborgsund (nomination district) =

- Guldborgsund
- Nomination district constituency for the Folketing
- Location of Guldborgsund within Zealand

- Location of Zealand within Denmark
- Municipalities: Guldborgsund
- Constituency: Zealand
- Electorate: 46,871 (2022)

Current constituency
- Created: 2007

Guldborgsund nominating district is one of the 92 nominating districts that was created for Danish elections following the 2007 municipal reform. It consists of Guldborgsund Municipality.

In general elections, the district tends to vote closely to the national results when looking at the voter split between the two blocs.

== General elections results ==
=== General elections in the 2020s ===
2022 Danish general election

Parties	Vote		
Parties	Votes	%	+ / -
Social Democrats	13,620	36.21	+1.99
Venstre	3,810	10.13	-11.04
Moderates	3,443	9.15	New
Denmark Democrats	3,311	8.80	New
Danish People's Party	3,308	8.79	-5.55
Green Left	3,059	8.13	+0.64
Liberal Alliance	1,693	4.50	+3.36
New Right	1,521	4.04	+1.81
Conservatives	1,460	3.88	-0.53
Red–Green Alliance	1,111	2.95	-1.83
The Alternative	531	1.41	-0.21
Social Liberals	495	1.32	-2.45
Christian Democrats	95	0.25	-0.61
Independent Greens	92	0.24	New
Rasmus Paludan	35	0.09	New
Lisa Sofia Larsson	34	0.09	New
Total	37,618		

=== General elections in the 2010s ===
2019 Danish general election

Parties	Vote		
Parties	Votes	%	+ / -
Social Democrats	12,995	34.22	+2.30
Venstre	8,040	21.17	+4.12
Danish People's Party	5,444	14.34	-14.75
Green Left	2,844	7.49	+4.16
Red–Green Alliance	1,815	4.78	-2.42
Conservatives	1,674	4.41	+2.06
Social Liberals	1,430	3.77	+1.78
Stram Kurs	1,102	2.90	New
New Right	847	2.23	New
The Alternative	614	1.62	-1.15
Liberal Alliance	432	1.14	-2.65
Klaus Riskær Pedersen Party	407	1.07	New
Christian Democrats	326	0.86	+0.38
Pinki Karin Yvonne Jensen	5	0.01	New
Total	37,975		

2015 Danish general election

Parties	Vote		
Parties	Votes	%	+ / -
Social Democrats	12,657	31.92	+0.24
Danish People's Party	11,534	29.09	+13.11
Venstre	6,760	17.05	-6.23
Red–Green Alliance	2,853	7.20	+1.58
Liberal Alliance	1,501	3.79	+0.68
Green Left	1,319	3.33	-6.98
The Alternative	1,097	2.77	New
Conservatives	933	2.35	-1.53
Social Liberals	791	1.99	-3.64
Christian Democrats	190	0.48	0.00
Aamer Ahmad	8	0.02	New
Michael Christiansen	6	0.02	New
Bent A. Jespersen	1	0.00	0.00
Total	39,650		

2011 Danish general election

Parties	Vote		
Parties	Votes	%	+ / -
Social Democrats	13,097	31.68	+0.98
Venstre	9,627	23.28	-2.59
Danish People's Party	6,606	15.98	-0.99
Green Left	4,262	10.31	-2.36
Social Liberals	2,328	5.63	+2.59
Red–Green Alliance	2,325	5.62	+4.24
Conservatives	1,603	3.88	-3.08
Liberal Alliance	1,284	3.11	+1.10
Christian Democrats	197	0.48	+0.09
Johan Isbrandt Haulik	14	0.03	New
Bent A. Jespersen	1	0.00	New
Peter Lotinga	1	0.00	New
Total	41,345		

=== General elections in the 2000s ===
2007 Danish general election

Parties	Vote		
Parties	Votes	%	+ / -
Social Democrats	12,852	30.70	
Venstre	10,829	25.87	
Danish People's Party	7,103	16.97	
Green Left	5,305	12.67	
Conservatives	2,913	6.96	
Social Liberals	1,274	3.04	
New Alliance	843	2.01	
Red–Green Alliance	577	1.38	
Christian Democrats	163	0.39	
Total	41,859		

== European Parliament elections results ==
2024 European Parliament election in Denmark

Parties	Vote		
Parties	Votes	%	+ / -
Social Democrats	5,125	21.86	-6.84
Green Left	3,393	14.47	+3.72
Venstre	2,918	12.45	-8.96
Danish People's Party	2,540	10.84	-5.05
Conservatives	2,441	10.41	+5.99
Denmark Democrats	2,217	9.46	New
Moderates	1,505	6.42	New
Liberal Alliance	1,194	5.09	+3.78
Red–Green Alliance	1,005	4.29	-0.43
Social Liberals	775	3.31	-2.56
The Alternative	329	1.40	-0.59
Total	23,442		

2019 European Parliament election in Denmark

Parties	Vote		
Parties	Votes	%	+ / -
Social Democrats	8,025	28.70	+7.04
Venstre	5,986	21.41	+5.78
Danish People's Party	4,442	15.89	-18.75
Green Left	3,005	10.75	+2.42
Social Liberals	1,641	5.87	+2.56
People's Movement against the EU	1,380	4.94	-3.05
Red–Green Alliance	1,320	4.72	New
Conservatives	1,237	4.42	-2.47
The Alternative	557	1.99	New
Liberal Alliance	366	1.31	-0.25
Total	27,959		

2014 European Parliament election in Denmark

Parties	Vote		
Parties	Votes	%	+ / -
Danish People's Party	8,860	34.64	+16.02
Social Democrats	5,541	21.66	-4.61
Venstre	3,998	15.63	-3.31
Green Left	2,130	8.33	-6.30
People's Movement against the EU	2,044	7.99	+1.94
Conservatives	1,762	6.89	-3.55
Social Liberals	846	3.31	+0.59
Liberal Alliance	399	1.56	+1.21
Total	25,580		

2009 European Parliament election in Denmark

Parties	Vote		
Parties	Votes	%	+ / -
Social Democrats	7,343	26.27	
Venstre	5,294	18.94	
Danish People's Party	5,205	18.62	
Green Left	4,089	14.63	
Conservatives	2,918	10.44	
People's Movement against the EU	1,690	6.05	
Social Liberals	761	2.72	
June Movement	554	1.98	
Liberal Alliance	97	0.35	
Total	27,951		

== Referendums ==
2022 Danish European Union opt-out referendum

Option	Votes	%
✓ YES	18,635	61.34
X NO	11,747	38.66

2015 Danish European Union opt-out referendum

Option	Votes	%
X NO	20,093	59.55
✓ YES	13,646	40.45

2014 Danish Unified Patent Court membership referendum

Option	Votes	%
✓ YES	14,437	57.87
X NO	10,512	42.13

2009 Danish Act of Succession referendum

Option	Votes	%
✓ YES	22,400	83.50
X NO	4,425	16.50
