= Faxe (nomination district) =

- Faxe
- Nomination district constituency for the Folketing
- Location of Faxe within Zealand

- Location of Zealand within Denmark
- Municipalities: Faxe; Stevns
- Constituency: Zealand
- Electorate: 45,733 (2022)

Current constituency
- Created: 1849 (as constituency); 2007 (as nomination district)

Faxe nominating district is one of the 92 nominating districts for Danish elections following the 2007 municipal reform. It consists of Faxe and Stevns municipalities. It was initially created as a constituency in 1849 and existed until 1915. In 2007, it was reestablished as a nomination district.

In general elections, the district is a strong area for parties commonly associated with the blue bloc.

== General elections results ==
=== General elections in the 2020s ===
2022 Danish general election

Parties	Vote		
Parties	Votes	%	+ / -
Social Democrats	10,876	28.83	+2.53
Venstre	4,517	11.97	-12.69
Moderates	4,117	10.91	New
Denmark Democrats	3,944	10.45	New
Green Left	3,600	9.54	+0.07
Liberal Alliance	2,462	6.53	+4.75
New Right	2,107	5.59	+2.69
Conservatives	1,756	4.65	-2.03
Danish People's Party	1,680	4.45	-7.51
Red–Green Alliance	1,042	2.76	-2.06
Social Liberals	703	1.86	-2.43
The Alternative	680	1.80	+0.02
Christian Democrats	90	0.24	-0.58
Independent Greens	68	0.18	New
Lisa Sofia Larsson	47	0.12	New
Rasmus Paludan	37	0.10	New
Total	37,726		

=== General elections in the 2010s ===
2019 Danish general election

Parties	Vote		
Parties	Votes	%	+ / -
Social Democrats	9,793	26.30	+1.32
Venstre	9,180	24.66	+4.19
Danish People's Party	4,453	11.96	-16.68
Green Left	3,525	9.47	+5.47
Conservatives	2,487	6.68	+3.42
Red–Green Alliance	1,793	4.82	-1.42
Social Liberals	1,596	4.29	+1.78
Stram Kurs	1,221	3.28	New
New Right	1,078	2.90	New
The Alternative	663	1.78	-1.43
Liberal Alliance	662	1.78	-4.50
Klaus Riskær Pedersen Party	471	1.27	New
Christian Democrats	305	0.82	+0.46
Pinki Karin Yvonne Jensen	6	0.02	New
Total	37,233		

2015 Danish general election

Parties	Vote		
Parties	Votes	%	+ / -
Danish People's Party	10,660	28.64	+10.76
Social Democrats	9,297	24.98	+2.44
Venstre	7,621	20.47	-8.03
Liberal Alliance	2,337	6.28	+1.84
Red–Green Alliance	2,324	6.24	+1.03
Green Left	1,489	4.00	-4.61
Conservatives	1,212	3.26	-1.97
The Alternative	1,195	3.21	New
Social Liberals	934	2.51	-4.74
Christian Democrats	133	0.36	+0.05
Michael Christiansen	10	0.03	New
Aamer Ahmad	9	0.02	New
Bent A. Jespersen	1	0.00	0.00
Total	37,222		

2011 Danish general election

Parties	Vote		
Parties	Votes	%	+ / -
Venstre	10,749	28.50	-1.12
Social Democrats	8,501	22.54	-1.59
Danish People's Party	6,744	17.88	+0.49
Green Left	3,249	8.61	-2.52
Social Liberals	2,734	7.25	+3.53
Conservatives	1,972	5.23	-4.34
Red–Green Alliance	1,966	5.21	+3.83
Liberal Alliance	1,675	4.44	+1.77
Christian Democrats	116	0.31	-0.10
Johan Isbrandt Haulik	9	0.02	New
Peter Lotinga	2	0.01	New
Bent A. Jespersen	0	0.00	New
Total	37,717		

=== General elections in the 2000s ===
2007 Danish general election

Parties	Vote		
Parties	Votes	%	+ / -
Venstre	11,007	29.62	
Social Democrats	8,966	24.13	
Danish People's Party	6,461	17.39	
Green Left	4,138	11.13	
Conservatives	3,555	9.57	
Social Liberals	1,382	3.72	
New Alliance	992	2.67	
Red–Green Alliance	512	1.38	
Christian Democrats	151	0.41	
Total	37,164		

== European Parliament elections results ==
2024 European Parliament election in Denmark

Parties	Vote		
Parties	Votes	%	+ / -
Social Democrats	4,202	17.14	-4.87
Green Left	3,743	15.27	+3.6
Venstre	3,712	15.14	-9.11
Danish People's Party	2,526	10.30	-5.53
Denmark Democrats	2,447	9.98	New
Conservatives	1,979	8.07	+1.89
Moderates	1,689	6.89	New
Liberal Alliance	1,589	6.48	+4.67
Red–Green Alliance	1,141	4.65	+0.16
Social Liberals	1,055	4.30	-2.09
The Alternative	435	1.77	-0.50
Total	24,518		

2019 European Parliament election in Denmark

Parties	Vote		
Parties	Votes	%	+ / -
Venstre	6,800	24.25	+6.98
Social Democrats	6,172	22.01	+5.63
Danish People's Party	4,439	15.83	-18.62
Green Left	3,273	11.67	+2.57
Social Liberals	1,791	6.39	+1.82
Conservatives	1,733	6.18	-1.68
People's Movement against the EU	1,433	5.11	-2.97
Red–Green Alliance	1,260	4.49	New
The Alternative	637	2.27	New
Liberal Alliance	507	1.81	-0.49
Total	28,045		

2014 European Parliament election in Denmark

Parties	Vote		
Parties	Votes	%	+ / -
Danish People's Party	8,105	34.45	+14.66
Venstre	4,063	17.27	-4.02
Social Democrats	3,854	16.38	-2.79
Green Left	2,141	9.10	-5.21
People's Movement against the EU	1,900	8.08	+0.70
Conservatives	1,849	7.86	-4.05
Social Liberals	1,075	4.57	+1.44
Liberal Alliance	542	2.30	+1.77
Total	23,529		

2009 European Parliament election in Denmark

Parties	Vote		
Parties	Votes	%	+ / -
Venstre	5,346	21.29	
Danish People's Party	4,971	19.79	
Social Democrats	4,815	19.17	
Green Left	3,593	14.31	
Conservatives	2,990	11.91	
People's Movement against the EU	1,853	7.38	
Social Liberals	785	3.13	
June Movement	629	2.50	
Liberal Alliance	132	0.53	
Total	25,114		

== Referendums ==
2022 Danish European Union opt-out referendum

Option	Votes	%
✓ YES	18,740	61.69
X NO	11,640	38.31

2015 Danish European Union opt-out referendum

Option	Votes	%
X NO	18,794	59.19
✓ YES	12,957	40.81

2014 Danish Unified Patent Court membership referendum

Option	Votes	%
✓ YES	13,698	59.21
X NO	9,435	40.79

2009 Danish Act of Succession referendum

Option	Votes	%
✓ YES	20,229	84.56
X NO	3,694	15.44
