= Struer (nomination district) =

- Struer
- Nomination district constituency for the Folketing
- Location of Struer within West Jutland

- Location of West Jutland within Denmark
- Municipalities: Lemvig; Struer
- Constituency: West Jutland
- Electorate: 30,360 (2022)

Current constituency
- Created: 2007

Struer nominating district is one of the 92 nominating districts that was created for Danish elections following the 2007 municipal reform. It consists of Stuer and Lemvig Municipality.

In general elections, the district is a strong area for parties commonly associated with the blue bloc, and prior to the 2022 election, Venstre had always won the most votes.

== General elections results ==
=== General elections in the 2020s ===
2022 Danish general election

Parties	Vote		
Parties	Votes	%	+ / -
Social Democrats	7,085	27.48	+0.71
Venstre	5,862	22.73	-9.04
Denmark Democrats	3,957	15.34	New
Liberal Alliance	1,681	6.52	+4.72
Green Left	1,533	5.94	-0.07
Conservatives	1,456	5.65	-2.61
Moderates	1,292	5.01	New
New Right	820	3.18	+1.56
Danish People's Party	587	2.28	-6.26
Social Liberals	447	1.73	-2.84
Red–Green Alliance	414	1.61	-1.19
Christian Democrats	324	1.26	-3.20
The Alternative	264	1.02	-0.23
Independent Greens	43	0.17	New
Karen Predbjørn Klarbæk	22	0.09	New
Total	25,787		

=== General elections in the 2010s ===
2019 Danish general election

Parties	Vote		
Parties	Votes	%	+ / -
Venstre	8,330	31.77	+3.03
Social Democrats	7,018	26.77	+0.70
Danish People's Party	2,240	8.54	-13.02
Conservatives	2,165	8.26	+3.46
Green Left	1,576	6.01	+1.57
Social Liberals	1,198	4.57	+2.49
Christian Democrats	1,169	4.46	+2.80
Red–Green Alliance	733	2.80	-1.23
Liberal Alliance	471	1.80	-2.52
New Right	424	1.62	New
Stram Kurs	423	1.61	New
The Alternative	328	1.25	-1.00
Klaus Riskær Pedersen Party	143	0.55	New
Total	26,218		

2015 Danish general election

Parties	Vote		
Parties	Votes	%	+ / -
Venstre	7,878	28.74	-0.93
Social Democrats	7,147	26.07	+1.70
Danish People's Party	5,909	21.56	+9.18
Conservatives	1,317	4.80	+1.53
Green Left	1,218	4.44	-5.98
Liberal Alliance	1,184	4.32	-0.25
Red–Green Alliance	1,104	4.03	+1.11
The Alternative	618	2.25	New
Social Liberals	571	2.08	-4.12
Christian Democrats	455	1.66	-4.52
Erik Sputnik	11	0.04	New
Total	27,412		

2011 Danish general election

Parties	Vote		
Parties	Votes	%	+ / -
Venstre	8,470	29.67	-8.00
Social Democrats	6,958	24.37	+1.98
Danish People's Party	3,536	12.38	-0.04
Green Left	2,975	10.42	-2.55
Social Liberals	1,770	6.20	+2.83
Christian Democrats	1,765	6.18	+3.82
Liberal Alliance	1,306	4.57	+2.98
Conservatives	934	3.27	-3.28
Red–Green Alliance	833	2.92	+2.26
Rikke Cramer Christiansen	4	0.01	New
Ejgil Kølbæk	1	0.00	-0.03
Total	28,552		

=== General elections in the 2000s ===
2007 Danish general election

Parties	Vote		
Parties	Votes	%	+ / -
Venstre	10,842	37.67	
Social Democrats	6,444	22.39	
Green Left	3,734	12.97	
Danish People's Party	3,576	12.42	
Conservatives	1,884	6.55	
Social Liberals	969	3.37	
Christian Democrats	678	2.36	
New Alliance	457	1.59	
Red–Green Alliance	190	0.66	
Ejgil Kølbæk	8	0.03	
Total	28,782		

== European Parliament elections results ==
2024 European Parliament election in Denmark

Parties	Vote		
Parties	Votes	%	+ / -
Venstre	3,913	22.90	-20.23
Social Democrats	2,581	15.11	-3.81
Green Left	2,379	13.92	+4.26
Denmark Democrats	2,347	13.74	New
Liberal Alliance	1,382	8.09	+6.7
Danish People's Party	1,315	7.70	-2.41
Conservatives	1,298	7.60	+3.77
Moderates	714	4.18	New
Social Liberals	615	3.60	-2.39
Red–Green Alliance	372	2.18	-0.45
The Alternative	170	0.99	-0.26
Total	17,086		

2019 European Parliament election in Denmark

Parties	Vote		
Parties	Votes	%	+ / -
Venstre	8,851	43.13	+19.38
Social Democrats	3,883	18.92	+1.59
Danish People's Party	2,075	10.11	-19.28
Green Left	1,982	9.66	+1.91
Social Liberals	1,229	5.99	+1.64
Conservatives	786	3.83	-6.27
People's Movement against the EU	635	3.09	-2.10
Red–Green Alliance	539	2.63	New
Liberal Alliance	285	1.39	-0.75
The Alternative	257	1.25	New
Total	20,522		

2014 European Parliament election in Denmark

Parties	Vote		
Parties	Votes	%	+ / -
Danish People's Party	5,194	29.39	+15.17
Venstre	4,197	23.75	-2.63
Social Democrats	3,062	17.33	-0.83
Conservatives	1,785	10.10	-7.12
Green Left	1,370	7.75	-5.89
People's Movement against the EU	917	5.19	+0.23
Social Liberals	768	4.35	+1.30
Liberal Alliance	378	2.14	+1.75
Total	17,671		

2009 European Parliament election in Denmark

Parties	Vote		
Parties	Votes	%	+ / -
Venstre	4,952	26.38	
Social Democrats	3,410	18.16	
Conservatives	3,232	17.22	
Danish People's Party	2,670	14.22	
Green Left	2,561	13.64	
People's Movement against the EU	931	4.96	
Social Liberals	573	3.05	
June Movement	372	1.98	
Liberal Alliance	73	0.39	
Total	18,774		

== Referendums ==
2022 Danish European Union opt-out referendum

Option	Votes	%
✓ YES	13,526	65.56
X NO	7,106	34.44

2015 Danish European Union opt-out referendum

Option	Votes	%
X NO	13,336	54.84
✓ YES	10,984	45.16

2014 Danish Unified Patent Court membership referendum

Option	Votes	%
✓ YES	11,435	66.76
X NO	5,693	33.24

2009 Danish Act of Succession referendum

Option	Votes	%
✓ YES	15,554	85.57
X NO	2,622	14.43
