= Rødovre (nomination district) =

- Rødovre
- Nomination district constituency for the Folketing
- Location of Rødovre within Greater Copenhagen

- Location of Greater Copenhagen within Denmark
- Municipalities: Herlev; Rødovre
- Constituency: Greater Copenhagen
- Electorate: 48,504 (2022)

Current constituency
- Created: 1966

Rødovre nominating district is one of the 92 nominating districts that exists for Danish elections following the 2007 municipal reform. It consists of Herlev and Rødovre municipality. It was created in 1966 and has maintained its boundaries since then.

In general elections, the district is a strong area for parties commonly associated with the red bloc.

== General elections results ==
=== General elections in the 2020s ===
2022 Danish general election

Parties	Vote		
Parties	Votes	%	+ / -
Social Democrats	12,830	33.36	+1.71
Green Left	3,851	10.01	-0.21
Moderates	3,742	9.73	New
Venstre	3,102	8.07	-6.57
Liberal Alliance	2,431	6.32	+4.37
Red–Green Alliance	2,423	6.30	-2.31
Conservatives	1,945	5.06	-0.82
Denmark Democrats	1,624	4.22	New
Danish People's Party	1,550	4.03	-4.91
Social Liberals	1,546	4.02	-4.38
New Right	1,212	3.15	+0.83
The Alternative	1,107	2.88	+0.10
Independent Greens	854	2.22	New
Christian Democrats	195	0.51	-0.70
Jovan Tasevski	41	0.11	New
Henrik Vendelbo Petersen	7	0.02	New
Total	38,460		

=== General elections in the 2010s ===
2019 Danish general election

Parties	Vote		
Parties	Votes	%	+ / -
Social Democrats	12,547	31.65	-2.14
Venstre	5,803	14.64	+2.44
Green Left	4,051	10.22	+5.18
Danish People's Party	3,545	8.94	-13.25
Red–Green Alliance	3,414	8.61	-0.97
Social Liberals	3,330	8.40	+4.59
Conservatives	2,331	5.88	+2.93
The Alternative	1,101	2.78	-1.29
New Right	918	2.32	New
Stram Kurs	909	2.29	New
Liberal Alliance	774	1.95	-3.64
Christian Democrats	479	1.21	+0.52
Klaus Riskær Pedersen Party	304	0.77	New
Mads Palsvig	138	0.35	New
Christian B. Olesen	5	0.01	New
Total	39,649		

2015 Danish general election

Parties	Vote		
Parties	Votes	%	+ / -
Social Democrats	13,200	33.79	+2.44
Danish People's Party	8,666	22.19	+7.92
Venstre	4,765	12.20	-6.26
Red–Green Alliance	3,741	9.58	+1.43
Liberal Alliance	2,184	5.59	+1.84
Green Left	1,967	5.04	-4.80
The Alternative	1,591	4.07	New
Social Liberals	1,488	3.81	-4.97
Conservatives	1,151	2.95	-1.81
Christian Democrats	268	0.69	+0.13
Asif Ahmad	33	0.08	New
Christian Olesen	7	0.02	New
Total	39,061		

2011 Danish general election

Parties	Vote		
Parties	Votes	%	+ / -
Social Democrats	12,413	31.35	-1.84
Venstre	7,308	18.46	+2.07
Danish People's Party	5,649	14.27	-2.20
Green Left	3,897	9.84	-4.79
Social Liberals	3,478	8.78	+4.35
Red–Green Alliance	3,226	8.15	+5.64
Conservatives	1,884	4.76	-4.50
Liberal Alliance	1,486	3.75	+1.40
Christian Democrats	222	0.56	-0.20
Christian H. Hansen	31	0.08	New
Total	39,594		

=== General elections in the 2000s ===
2007 Danish general election

Parties	Vote		
Parties	Votes	%	+ / -
Social Democrats	13,044	33.19	-0.08
Danish People's Party	6,474	16.47	-0.23
Venstre	6,442	16.39	-3.07
Green Left	5,750	14.63	+7.66
Conservatives	3,641	9.26	+0.59
Social Liberals	1,742	4.43	-3.58
Red–Green Alliance	985	2.51	-1.54
New Alliance	923	2.35	New
Christian Democrats	299	0.76	-0.61
Janus Kramer Møller	2	0.01	New
Feride Istogu Gillesberg	0	0.00	New
Total	39,302		

2005 Danish general election

Parties	Vote		
Parties	Votes	%	+ / -
Social Democrats	12,877	33.27	-3.54
Venstre	7,530	19.46	-2.71
Danish People's Party	6,464	16.70	+1.38
Conservatives	3,354	8.67	+1.74
Social Liberals	3,100	8.01	+3.87
Green Left	2,696	6.97	-0.89
Red–Green Alliance	1,566	4.05	+1.34
Christian Democrats	530	1.37	-0.46
Centre Democrats	465	1.20	-0.72
Minority Party	110	0.28	New
Nahid Yazdanyar	8	0.02	New
Total	38,700		

2001 Danish general election

Parties	Vote		
Parties	Votes	%	+ / -
Social Democrats	15,026	36.81	-5.61
Venstre	9,049	22.17	+8.05
Danish People's Party	6,253	15.32	+4.47
Green Left	3,209	7.86	-1.95
Conservatives	2,831	6.93	-1.17
Social Liberals	1,688	4.14	+1.09
Red–Green Alliance	1,108	2.71	-0.48
Centre Democrats	784	1.92	-2.98
Christian People's Party	749	1.83	+0.05
Progress Party	125	0.31	-0.97
Total	40,822		

=== General elections in the 1990s ===
1998 Danish general election

Parties	Vote		
Parties	Votes	%	+ / -
Social Democrats	17,127	42.42	+2.75
Venstre	5,700	14.12	+1.72
Danish People's Party	4,382	10.85	New
Green Left	3,962	9.81	-0.30
Conservatives	3,269	8.10	-8.58
Centre Democrats	1,980	4.90	+0.90
Red–Green Alliance	1,288	3.19	-0.86
Social Liberals	1,231	3.05	-1.15
Christian People's Party	718	1.78	+0.38
Progress Party	516	1.28	-4.76
Democratic Renewal	99	0.25	New
Mogens Glistrup	96	0.24	-0.16
Poul Bregninge	3	0.01	New
Anders Kofoed	0	0.00	New
Total	40,371		

1994 Danish general election

Parties	Vote		
Parties	Votes	%	+ / -
Social Democrats	15,936	39.67	-4.21
Conservatives	6,700	16.68	+0.09
Venstre	4,980	12.40	+5.81
Green Left	4,062	10.11	-0.50
Progress Party	2,426	6.04	+2.32
Social Liberals	1,688	4.20	+1.04
Red–Green Alliance	1,627	4.05	+1.97
Centre Democrats	1,608	4.00	-3.19
Christian People's Party	563	1.40	-0.08
Niels I. Meyer	239	0.59	New
Preben Møller Hansen	173	0.43	New
Mogens Glistrup	161	0.40	New
Torben Faber	9	0.02	New
John Ziegler	1	0.00	New
Total	40,173		

1990 Danish general election

Parties	Vote		
Parties	Votes	%	+ / -
Social Democrats	17,361	43.88	+10.14
Conservatives	6,565	16.59	-2.21
Green Left	4,198	10.61	-7.64
Centre Democrats	2,845	7.19	+1.84
Venstre	2,607	6.59	+3.31
Progress Party	1,472	3.72	-3.44
Social Liberals	1,250	3.16	-2.88
Common Course	1,242	3.14	+0.54
Red–Green Alliance	823	2.08	New
Christian People's Party	584	1.48	+0.22
The Greens	347	0.88	-0.81
Justice Party of Denmark	259	0.65	New
Humanist Party	14	0.04	New
Total	39,567		

=== General elections in the 1980s ===
1988 Danish general election

Parties	Vote		
Parties	Votes	%	+ / -
Social Democrats	14,060	33.74	+1.83
Conservatives	7,833	18.80	-0.47
Green Left	7,604	18.25	-3.15
Progress Party	2,982	7.16	+3.39
Social Liberals	2,516	6.04	-0.62
Centre Democrats	2,231	5.35	-0.22
Venstre	1,367	3.28	+1.25
Common Course	1,084	2.60	-0.41
The Greens	706	1.69	+0.27
Communist Party of Denmark	540	1.30	-0.03
Christian People's Party	527	1.26	-0.22
Left Socialists	216	0.52	-0.75
Leif Hilt	0	0.00	New
Total	41,666		

1987 Danish general election

Parties	Vote		
Parties	Votes	%	+ / -
Social Democrats	13,634	31.91	-5.02
Green Left	9,145	21.40	+4.58
Conservatives	8,232	19.27	-2.23
Social Liberals	2,846	6.66	+0.59
Centre Democrats	2,379	5.57	+1.14
Progress Party	1,611	3.77	+0.80
Common Course	1,288	3.01	New
Venstre	868	2.03	-1.31
Christian People's Party	631	1.48	-0.04
The Greens	606	1.42	New
Communist Party of Denmark	567	1.33	+0.18
Left Socialists	544	1.27	-1.71
Justice Party of Denmark	249	0.58	-1.62
Humanist Party	94	0.22	New
Socialist Workers Party	18	0.04	-0.03
Marxist–Leninists Party	13	0.03	+0.01
Carsten Grøn-Nielsen	3	0.01	+0.01
Per Hillersborg	0	0.00	New
Total	42,728		

1984 Danish general election

Parties	Vote		
Parties	Votes	%	+ / -
Social Democrats	16,251	36.93	-0.83
Conservatives	9,460	21.50	+7.46
Green Left	7,403	16.82	+0.42
Social Liberals	2,669	6.07	+0.64
Centre Democrats	1,948	4.43	-3.69
Venstre	1,468	3.34	+1.08
Left Socialists	1,312	2.98	-0.29
Progress Party	1,309	2.97	-4.31
Justice Party of Denmark	967	2.20	+0.18
Christian People's Party	670	1.52	+0.35
Communist Party of Denmark	504	1.15	-0.84
Socialist Workers Party	30	0.07	+0.01
Marxist–Leninists Party	9	0.02	New
Carsten Grøn-Nielsen	1	0.00	New
Mogens Nebelong	0	0.00	-0.02
Poul Rasmussen	0	0.00	New
Total	44,001		

1981 Danish general election

Parties	Vote		
Parties	Votes	%	+ / -
Social Democrats	15,740	37.76	-6.89
Green Left	6,838	16.40	+7.88
Conservatives	5,853	14.04	+2.21
Centre Democrats	3,385	8.12	+5.18
Progress Party	3,036	7.28	-0.98
Social Liberals	2,264	5.43	-0.91
Left Socialists	1,364	3.27	-1.71
Venstre	941	2.26	-1.43
Justice Party of Denmark	844	2.02	-1.98
Communist Party of Denmark	829	1.99	-0.89
Christian People's Party	488	1.17	-0.15
Communist Workers Party	73	0.18	-0.41
Socialist Workers Party	26	0.06	New
Mogens Nebelong	8	0.02	New
Total	41,689		

=== General elections in the 1970s ===
1979 Danish general election

Parties	Vote		
Parties	Votes	%	+ / -
Social Democrats	19,074	44.65	+0.48
Conservatives	5,053	11.83	+4.39
Green Left	3,641	8.52	+2.72
Progress Party	3,528	8.26	-4.09
Social Liberals	2,707	6.34	+3.36
Left Socialists	2,127	4.98	+1.49
Justice Party of Denmark	1,707	4.00	-0.82
Venstre	1,576	3.69	+0.28
Centre Democrats	1,256	2.94	-4.96
Communist Party of Denmark	1,231	2.88	-2.40
Christian People's Party	563	1.32	-0.40
Communist Workers Party	253	0.59	New
Total	42,716		

1977 Danish general election

Parties	Vote		
Parties	Votes	%	+ / -
Social Democrats	18,439	44.17	+9.81
Progress Party	5,156	12.35	-1.64
Centre Democrats	3,298	7.90	+5.13
Conservatives	3,107	7.44	+1.54
Green Left	2,422	5.80	-2.35
Communist Party of Denmark	2,204	5.28	-0.77
Justice Party of Denmark	2,013	4.82	+2.48
Left Socialists	1,458	3.49	+1.11
Venstre	1,423	3.41	-10.05
Social Liberals	1,245	2.98	-3.98
Christian People's Party	717	1.72	-1.91
Pensioners' Party	265	0.63	New
Otto Jensen	2	0.00	New
Poul Rasmussen	1	0.00	New
Total	41,750		

1975 Danish general election

Parties	Vote		
Parties	Votes	%	+ / -
Social Democrats	13,709	34.36	+7.16
Progress Party	5,581	13.99	-1.14
Venstre	5,371	13.46	+9.04
Green Left	3,250	8.15	-1.63
Social Liberals	2,779	6.96	-2.42
Communist Party of Denmark	2,414	6.05	+0.70
Conservatives	2,354	5.90	-3.43
Christian People's Party	1,447	3.63	+1.45
Centre Democrats	1,104	2.77	-8.91
Left Socialists	949	2.38	+0.38
Justice Party of Denmark	934	2.34	-1.21
J. G. Amdrejcak	5	0.01	New
Poul Friborg	3	0.01	New
Kai Clemmensen	0	0.00	New
Henning Glahn	0	0.00	New
Total	39,900		

1973 Danish general election

Parties	Vote		
Parties	Votes	%	+ / -
Social Democrats	10,917	27.20	-12.55
Progress Party	6,073	15.13	New
Centre Democrats	4,688	11.68	New
Green Left	3,924	9.78	-4.86
Social Liberals	3,766	9.38	-3.97
Conservatives	3,745	9.33	-11.38
Communist Party of Denmark	2,148	5.35	+3.35
Venstre	1,772	4.42	-0.08
Justice Party of Denmark	1,424	3.55	+1.72
Christian People's Party	875	2.18	+1.19
Left Socialists	801	2.00	-0.08
Erik Dissing	0	0.00	New
Total	40,133		

1971 Danish general election

Parties	Vote		
Parties	Votes	%	+ / -
Social Democrats	15,441	39.75	+5.72
Conservatives	8,045	20.71	-4.32
Green Left	5,688	14.64	+4.98
Social Liberals	5,185	13.35	-5.02
Venstre	1,747	4.50	-0.14
Left Socialists	809	2.08	-1.56
Communist Party of Denmark	778	2.00	+0.48
Justice Party of Denmark	710	1.83	+1.23
Christian People's Party	383	0.99	New
Henning Berthelsen	62	0.16	New
Total	38,848		

=== General elections in the 1960s ===
1968 Danish general election

Parties	Vote		
Parties	Votes	%	+ / -
Social Democrats	13,184	34.03	-5.88
Conservatives	9,696	25.03	+5.96
Social Liberals	7,116	18.37	+10.34
Green Left	3,744	9.66	-9.42
Venstre	1,799	4.64	-1.87
Left Socialists	1,410	3.64	New
Liberal Centre	896	2.31	-2.57
Communist Party of Denmark	588	1.52	+0.31
Justice Party of Denmark	231	0.60	+0.07
Independent Party	77	0.20	-0.57
H. Søndersted Andersen	1	0.01	New
Kirsten Lonning	1	0.01	New
Thode Karlsen	1	0.01	0.00
Total	38,741		

1966 Danish general election

Parties	Vote		
Parties	Votes	%	+ / -
Social Democrats	14,614	39.91	
Green Left	6,988	19.08	
Conservatives	6,984	19.07	
Social Liberals	2,940	8.03	
Venstre	2,382	6.51	
Liberal Centre	1,786	4.88	
Communist Party of Denmark	442	1.21	
Independent Party	282	0.77	
Justice Party of Denmark	194	0.53	
Thode Karlsen	5	0.01	
Total	36,617		

== European Parliament elections results ==
2024 European Parliament election in Denmark

Parties	Vote		
Parties	Votes	%	+ / -
Green Left	5,365	20.43	+5.21
Social Democrats	5,259	20.03	-6.33
Red–Green Alliance	2,552	9.72	+1.94
Conservatives	2,279	8.68	+2.82
Venstre	2,251	8.57	-5.39
Danish People's Party	1,978	7.53	-3.82
Social Liberals	1,904	7.25	-2.60
Moderates	1,561	5.95	New
Liberal Alliance	1,479	5.63	+4.13
Denmark Democrats	901	3.43	New
The Alternative	728	2.77	-0.33
Total	26,257		

2019 European Parliament election in Denmark

Parties	Vote		
Parties	Votes	%	+ / -
Social Democrats	7,907	26.36	+2.54
Green Left	4,565	15.22	+3.73
Venstre	4,187	13.96	+4.39
Danish People's Party	3,404	11.35	-18.21
Social Liberals	2,956	9.85	+3.93
Red–Green Alliance	2,335	7.78	New
Conservatives	1,759	5.86	-1.28
People's Movement against the EU	1,506	5.02	-5.33
The Alternative	929	3.10	New
Liberal Alliance	451	1.50	-0.67
Total	29,999		

2014 European Parliament election in Denmark

Parties	Vote		
Parties	Votes	%	+ / -
Danish People's Party	7,611	29.56	+11.08
Social Democrats	6,131	23.82	-1.71
Green Left	2,957	11.49	-6.17
People's Movement against the EU	2,664	10.35	-0.30
Venstre	2,463	9.57	-2.23
Conservatives	1,837	7.14	-2.48
Social Liberals	1,523	5.92	+2.41
Liberal Alliance	558	2.17	+1.69
Total	25,744		

2009 European Parliament election in Denmark

Parties	Vote		
Parties	Votes	%	+ / -
Social Democrats	6,730	25.53	-12.79
Danish People's Party	4,873	18.48	+9.99
Green Left	4,656	17.66	+7.99
Venstre	3,111	11.80	+2.34
People's Movement against the EU	2,808	10.65	+3.06
Conservatives	2,536	9.62	-1.19
Social Liberals	926	3.51	-1.22
June Movement	599	2.27	-7.61
Liberal Alliance	127	0.48	New
Total	26,366		

2004 European Parliament election in Denmark

Parties	Vote		
Parties	Votes	%	+ / -
Social Democrats	8,557	38.32	+18.97
Conservatives	2,415	10.81	+2.94
June Movement	2,206	9.88	-8.88
Green Left	2,159	9.67	-0.15
Venstre	2,113	9.46	-3.57
Danish People's Party	1,895	8.49	+0.43
People's Movement against the EU	1,695	7.59	-2.43
Social Liberals	1,056	4.73	-3.48
Christian Democrats	236	1.06	-0.48
Total	22,332		

1999 European Parliament election in Denmark

Parties	Vote		
Parties	Votes	%	+ / -
Social Democrats	4,726	19.35	+1.45
June Movement	4,581	18.76	+0.53
Venstre	3,181	13.03	+4.11
People's Movement against the EU	2,446	10.02	-3.85
Green Left	2,399	9.82	-1.52
Social Liberals	2,006	8.21	-1.08
Danish People's Party	1,969	8.06	New
Conservatives	1,922	7.87	-7.91
Centre Democrats	815	3.34	+2.32
Christian Democrats	376	1.54	+0.62
Progress Party	115	0.47	-2.27
Total	24,421		

1994 European Parliament election in Denmark

Parties	Vote		
Parties	Votes	%	+ / -
June Movement	4,785	18.23	New
Social Democrats	4,698	17.90	-8.37
Conservatives	4,144	15.78	+4.43
People's Movement against the EU	3,642	13.87	-14.81
Green Left	2,977	11.34	-0.31
Social Liberals	2,439	9.29	+7.07
Venstre	2,341	8.92	+2.16
Progress Party	719	2.74	-1.07
Centre Democrats	267	1.02	-6.35
Christian Democrats	241	0.92	-0.98
Total	26,253		

1989 European Parliament election in Denmark

Parties	Vote		
Parties	Votes	%	+ / -
People's Movement against the EU	6,855	28.68	-0.51
Social Democrats	6,280	26.27	+3.84
Green Left	2,785	11.65	-2.95
Conservatives	2,714	11.35	-6.18
Centre Democrats	1,761	7.37	+2.04
Venstre	1,617	6.76	+4.31
Progress Party	910	3.81	+0.64
Social Liberals	530	2.22	-0.30
Christian Democrats	453	1.90	+0.16
Total	23,905		

1984 European Parliament election in Denmark

Parties	Vote	
Parties	Votes	%
People's Movement against the EU	7,831	29.19
Social Democrats	6,018	22.43
Conservatives	4,703	17.53
Green Left	3,916	14.60
Centre Democrats	1,429	5.33
Progress Party	851	3.17
Social Liberals	675	2.52
Venstre	658	2.45
Christian Democrats	468	1.74
Left Socialists	281	1.05
Total	26,830	

== Referendums ==
2022 Danish European Union opt-out referendum

Option	Votes	%
✓ YES	18,978	64.37
X NO	10,506	35.63

2015 Danish European Union opt-out referendum

Option	Votes	%
X NO	16,312	57.94
✓ YES	11,840	42.06

2014 Danish Unified Patent Court membership referendum

Option	Votes	%
✓ YES	14,329	57.08
X NO	10,774	42.92

2009 Danish Act of Succession referendum

Option	Votes	%
✓ YES	20,055	83.23
X NO	4,040	16.77

2000 Danish euro referendum

Option	Votes	%
X NO	24,383	59.39
✓ YES	16,672	40.61

1998 Danish Amsterdam Treaty referendum

Option	Votes	%
X NO	18,941	52.76
✓ YES	16,959	47.24

1993 Danish Maastricht Treaty referendum

Option	Votes	%
X NO	21,230	50.71
✓ YES	20,632	49.29

1992 Danish Maastricht Treaty referendum

Option	Votes	%
X NO	23,694	58.24
✓ YES	16,991	41.76

1986 Danish Single European Act referendum

Option	Votes	%
X NO	22,108	58.94
✓ YES	15,400	41.06

1972 Danish European Communities membership referendum

Option	Votes	%
✓ YES	22,363	53.92
X NO	19,115	46.08
