= Assens (nomination district) =

- Assens
- Nomination district constituency for the Folketing
- Location of Assens within Funen

- Location of Funen within Denmark
- Municipalities: Assens
- Constituency: Funen
- Electorate: 30,733 (2022)

Current constituency
- Created: 1849 (as constituency); 1920 (as nomination district)

Assens nominating district is one of the 92 nominating districts that exists for Danish elections following the 2007 municipal reform. It consists of Assens Municipality. It was created in 1849 as a constituency, and has been a nomination district since 1920, though its boundaries have been changed since then. It was abolished in 1970 before being recreated in 2007.

In general elections, the district tends to vote a bit more for parties commonly associated with the blue bloc.

== General elections results ==
=== General elections in the 2020s ===
2022 Danish general election

Parties	Vote		
Parties	Votes	%	+ / -
Social Democrats	8,762	34.46	+3.06
Venstre	3,940	15.50	-10.57
Denmark Democrats	2,706	10.64	New
Moderates	2,074	8.16	New
Green Left	1,663	6.54	+0.52
Liberal Alliance	1,315	5.17	+3.76
New Right	1,189	4.68	+2.48
Conservatives	1,096	4.31	-1.19
Danish People's Party	810	3.19	-8.20
Red–Green Alliance	719	2.83	-2.13
The Alternative	512	2.01	-0.20
Social Liberals	454	1.79	-2.66
Christian Democrats	110	0.43	-0.83
Independent Greens	41	0.16	New
Millah Kongsbach	36	0.14	New
Total	25,427		

=== General elections in the 2010s ===
2019 Danish general election

Parties	Vote		
Parties	Votes	%	+ / -
Social Democrats	8,152	31.40	+2.59
Venstre	6,767	26.07	+5.83
Danish People's Party	2,956	11.39	-13.50
Green Left	1,564	6.02	+2.49
Conservatives	1,428	5.50	+2.35
Red–Green Alliance	1,287	4.96	-1.83
Social Liberals	1,156	4.45	+1.89
Stram Kurs	594	2.29	New
The Alternative	574	2.21	-1.27
New Right	572	2.20	New
Liberal Alliance	365	1.41	-4.71
Christian Democrats	327	1.26	+0.83
Klaus Riskær Pedersen Party	218	0.84	New
Total	25,960		

2015 Danish general election

Parties	Vote		
Parties	Votes	%	+ / -
Social Democrats	7,657	28.81	-0.12
Danish People's Party	6,617	24.89	+11.48
Venstre	5,379	20.24	-6.30
Red–Green Alliance	1,806	6.79	+1.55
Liberal Alliance	1,626	6.12	+1.93
Green Left	939	3.53	-5.73
The Alternative	925	3.48	New
Conservatives	836	3.15	-1.61
Social Liberals	680	2.56	-4.58
Christian Democrats	115	0.43	-0.08
Total	26,580		

2011 Danish general election

Parties	Vote		
Parties	Votes	%	+ / -
Social Democrats	7,841	28.93	+2.01
Venstre	7,191	26.54	+2.50
Danish People's Party	3,634	13.41	-2.43
Green Left	2,509	9.26	-2.47
Social Liberals	1,935	7.14	+2.80
Red–Green Alliance	1,419	5.24	+4.11
Conservatives	1,291	4.76	-8.39
Liberal Alliance	1,135	4.19	+1.76
Christian Democrats	139	0.51	+0.09
Lars Grønbæk Larsen	4	0.01	New
Michael Ellegård	2	0.01	0.00
Total	27,100		

=== General elections in the 2000s ===
2007 Danish general election

Parties	Vote		
Parties	Votes	%	+ / -
Social Democrats	7,198	26.92	
Venstre	6,430	24.04	
Danish People's Party	4,236	15.84	
Conservatives	3,517	13.15	
Green Left	3,136	11.73	
Social Liberals	1,160	4.34	
New Alliance	649	2.43	
Red–Green Alliance	302	1.13	
Christian Democrats	112	0.42	
Michael Ellegård	3	0.01	
Total	26,743		

=== General elections in the 1960s ===
1968 Danish general election

Parties	Vote		
Parties	Votes	%	+ / -
Social Democrats	4,713	33.57	-4.63
Venstre	3,989	28.42	-1.56
Social Liberals	2,191	15.61	+6.70
Conservatives	2,114	15.06	+1.03
Green Left	522	3.72	-0.92
Liberal Centre	162	1.15	-0.45
Independent Party	113	0.80	-1.14
Left Socialists	109	0.78	New
Justice Party of Denmark	75	0.53	-0.02
Communist Party of Denmark	50	0.36	+0.21
Total	14,038		

1966 Danish general election

Parties	Vote		
Parties	Votes	%	+ / -
Social Democrats	5,305	38.20	-1.78
Venstre	4,164	29.98	-2.33
Conservatives	1,948	14.03	+0.10
Social Liberals	1,238	8.91	+1.76
Green Left	644	4.64	+2.24
Independent Party	269	1.94	-0.77
Liberal Centre	222	1.60	New
Justice Party of Denmark	77	0.55	-0.27
Communist Party of Denmark	21	0.15	-0.11
Total	13,888		

1964 Danish general election

Parties	Vote		
Parties	Votes	%	+ / -
Social Democrats	5,276	39.98	+1.61
Venstre	4,264	32.31	-3.43
Conservatives	1,839	13.93	+2.85
Social Liberals	944	7.15	-0.35
Independent Party	357	2.71	-0.40
Green Left	317	2.40	+0.26
Justice Party of Denmark	108	0.82	-0.87
Peace Politics People's Party	37	0.28	New
Communist Party of Denmark	34	0.26	-0.11
Danish Unity	21	0.16	New
Total	13,197		

1960 Danish general election

Parties	Vote		
Parties	Votes	%	+ / -
Social Democrats	4,873	38.37	+3.23
Venstre	4,539	35.74	-5.02
Conservatives	1,407	11.08	+1.54
Social Liberals	952	7.50	-0.76
Independent Party	395	3.11	+1.47
Green Left	272	2.14	New
Justice Party of Denmark	215	1.69	-2.05
Communist Party of Denmark	47	0.37	-0.55
Total	12,700		

=== General elections in the 1950s ===
1957 Danish general election

Parties	Vote		
Parties	Votes	%	+ / -
Venstre	5,204	40.76	+1.62
Social Democrats	4,487	35.14	-1.83
Conservatives	1,218	9.54	+0.61
Social Liberals	1,054	8.26	-0.05
Justice Party of Denmark	478	3.74	+0.58
Independent Party	210	1.64	-0.60
Communist Party of Denmark	117	0.92	-0.34
Total	12,768		

September 1953 Danish Folketing election

Parties	Vote		
Parties	Votes	%	+ / -
Venstre	4,863	39.14	+34.70
Social Democrats	4,593	36.97	-18.87
Conservatives	1,109	8.93	+4.96
Social Liberals	1,032	8.31	-7.66
Justice Party of Denmark	393	3.16	-13.49
Independent Party	278	2.24	New
Communist Party of Denmark	157	1.26	-1.27
Total	12,425		

April 1953 Danish Folketing election

Parties	Vote		
Parties	Votes	%	+ / -
Social Democrats	14,951	55.84	+20.27
Justice Party of Denmark	4,457	16.65	+10.32
Social Liberals	4,276	15.97	+6.85
Venstre	1,188	4.44	-32.41
Conservatives	1,064	3.97	-6.91
Communist Party of Denmark	678	2.53	+1.27
Danish Unity	160	0.60	New
Total	26,774		

1950 Danish Folketing election

Parties	Vote		
Parties	Votes	%	+ / -
Venstre	4,418	36.85	-9.51
Social Democrats	4,264	35.57	+3.03
Conservatives	1,304	10.88	+2.61
Social Liberals	1,093	9.12	+1.17
Justice Party of Denmark	759	6.33	+3.88
Communist Party of Denmark	151	1.26	-0.74
Total	11,989		

=== General elections in the 1940s ===
1947 Danish Folketing election

Parties	Vote		
Parties	Votes	%	+ / -
Venstre	6,168	46.36	+8.93
Social Democrats	4,329	32.54	+1.24
Conservatives	1,100	8.27	-4.18
Social Liberals	1,058	7.95	-2.63
Justice Party of Denmark	326	2.45	+1.05
Communist Party of Denmark	266	2.00	-3.12
Danish Unity	58	0.44	-1.27
Total	13,305		

1945 Danish Folketing election

Parties	Vote		
Parties	Votes	%	+ / -
Venstre	4,588	37.43	+4.57
Social Democrats	3,836	31.30	-6.01
Conservatives	1,526	12.45	-1.58
Social Liberals	1,297	10.58	+0.31
Communist Party of Denmark	628	5.12	New
Danish Unity	210	1.71	+0.53
Justice Party of Denmark	172	1.40	+0.27
Total	12,257		

1943 Danish Folketing election

Parties	Vote		
Parties	Votes	%	+ / -
Social Democrats	4,704	37.31	+2.44
Venstre	4,143	32.86	-2.63
Conservatives	1,769	14.03	+2.66
Social Liberals	1,295	10.27	+0.34
National Socialist Workers' Party of Denmark	220	1.74	-0.43
Farmers' Party	187	1.48	-1.07
Danish Unity	149	1.18	+0.94
Justice Party of Denmark	142	1.13	-1.02
Total	12,609		

=== General elections in the 1930s ===
1939 Danish Folketing election

Parties	Vote		
Parties	Votes	%	+ / -
Venstre	3,835	35.49	+2.24
Social Democrats	3,768	34.87	+0.24
Conservatives	1,229	11.37	-2.92
Social Liberals	1,073	9.93	-0.22
Farmers' Party	276	2.55	-1.12
National Socialist Workers' Party of Denmark	235	2.17	+1.35
Justice Party of Denmark	232	2.15	-0.81
Communist Party of Denmark	67	0.62	+0.40
National Cooperation	65	0.60	New
Danish Unity	26	0.24	New
Total	10,806		

1935 Danish Folketing election

Parties	Vote		
Parties	Votes	%	+ / -
Social Democrats	3,783	34.63	+3.89
Venstre	3,632	33.25	-7.92
Conservatives	1,561	14.29	-0.69
Social Liberals	1,109	10.15	-0.42
Independent People's Party	401	3.67	New
Justice Party of Denmark	323	2.96	+0.50
National Socialist Workers' Party of Denmark	90	0.82	New
Communist Party of Denmark	24	0.22	+0.15
Total	10,923		

1932 Danish Folketing election

Parties	Vote		
Parties	Votes	%	+ / -
Venstre	4,645	41.17	-4.89
Social Democrats	3,468	30.74	+0.72
Conservatives	1,690	14.98	+4.02
Social Liberals	1,193	10.57	-1.25
Justice Party of Denmark	278	2.46	+1.35
Communist Party of Denmark	8	0.07	+0.04
Total	11,282		

=== General elections in the 1920s ===
1929 Danish Folketing election

Parties	Vote		
Parties	Votes	%	+ / -
Venstre	4,924	46.06	-0.95
Social Democrats	3,209	30.02	+4.03
Social Liberals	1,264	11.82	-0.80
Conservatives	1,172	10.96	-3.00
Justice Party of Denmark	119	1.11	+0.71
Communist Party of Denmark	3	0.03	0.00
Total	10,691		

1926 Danish Folketing election

Parties	Vote		
Parties	Votes	%	+ / -
Venstre	4,716	47.01	+1.57
Social Democrats	2,607	25.99	+1.30
Conservatives	1,400	13.96	+0.80
Social Liberals	1,266	12.62	-1.93
Justice Party of Denmark	40	0.40	+0.18
Communist Party of Denmark	3	0.03	+0.01
Total	10,032		

1924 Danish Folketing election

Parties	Vote		
Parties	Votes	%	+ / -
Venstre	4,302	45.44	-5.49
Social Democrats	2,338	24.69	+5.13
Social Liberals	1,378	14.55	+0.75
Conservatives	1,246	13.16	-1.62
Farmer Party	181	1.91	New
Justice Party of Denmark	21	0.22	New
Communist Party of Denmark	2	0.02	New
Total	9,468		

September 1920 Danish Folketing election

Parties	Vote		
Parties	Votes	%	+ / -
Venstre	4,728	50.93	-4.02
Social Democrats	1,816	19.56	+2.56
Conservatives	1,372	14.78	-0.37
Social Liberals	1,281	13.80	+1.78
Free Social Democrats	53	0.57	New
Industry Party	24	0.26	+0.15
Danish Left Socialist Party	9	0.10	New
Total	9,283		

July 1920 Danish Folketing election

Parties	Vote		
Parties	Votes	%	+ / -
Venstre	4,476	54.95	+1.92
Social Democrats	1,385	17.00	-1.57
Conservatives	1,234	15.15	-0.90
Social Liberals	979	12.02	+0.82
C. E. Marott	61	0.75	New
Industry Party	9	0.11	New
Niels Madsen	1	0.01	-0.10
Total	8,145		

April 1920 Danish Folketing election

Parties	Vote	
Parties	Votes	%
Venstre	4,451	53.03
Social Democrats	1,559	18.57
Conservatives	1,347	16.05
Social Liberals	940	11.20
Free Social Democrats	88	1.05
Niels Madsen	9	0.11
Total	8,394	

== European Parliament elections results ==
2024 European Parliament election in Denmark

Parties	Vote		
Parties	Votes	%	+ / -
Social Democrats	3,624	20.77	-6.12
Venstre	3,062	17.55	-5.95
Green Left	2,483	14.23	+3.34
Denmark Democrats	1,811	10.38	New
Danish People's Party	1,375	7.88	-4.59
Conservatives	1,332	7.63	+0.73
Liberal Alliance	1,003	5.75	+4.01
Moderates	966	5.54	New
Social Liberals	834	4.78	-1.85
Red–Green Alliance	641	3.67	-0.43
The Alternative	317	1.82	-0.63
Total	17,448		

2019 European Parliament election in Denmark

Parties	Vote		
Parties	Votes	%	+ / -
Social Democrats	5,432	26.89	+5.42
Venstre	4,748	23.50	+8.81
Danish People's Party	2,519	12.47	-14.24
Green Left	2,201	10.89	+3.12
Conservatives	1,394	6.90	-10.93
Social Liberals	1,340	6.63	+2.84
People's Movement against the EU	896	4.43	-1.84
Red–Green Alliance	828	4.10	New
The Alternative	494	2.45	New
Liberal Alliance	351	1.74	+0.27
Total	20,203		

2014 European Parliament election in Denmark

Parties	Vote		
Parties	Votes	%	+ / -
Danish People's Party	4,684	26.71	+13.37
Social Democrats	3,765	21.47	-5.77
Conservatives	3,128	17.83	-0.39
Venstre	2,577	14.69	-3.59
Green Left	1,363	7.77	-5.11
People's Movement against the EU	1,100	6.27	+1.56
Social Liberals	665	3.79	+1.18
Liberal Alliance	257	1.47	+1.05
Total	17,539		

2009 European Parliament election in Denmark

Parties	Vote		
Parties	Votes	%	+ / -
Social Democrats	5,127	27.24	
Venstre	3,441	18.28	
Conservatives	3,429	18.22	
Danish People's Party	2,511	13.34	
Green Left	2,425	12.88	
People's Movement against the EU	886	4.71	
Social Liberals	492	2.61	
June Movement	432	2.30	
Liberal Alliance	79	0.42	
Total	18,822		

== Referendums ==
2022 Danish European Union opt-out referendum

Option	Votes	%
✓ YES	13,840	66.00
X NO	7,131	34.00

2015 Danish European Union opt-out referendum

Option	Votes	%
X NO	12,646	55.24
✓ YES	10,248	44.76

2014 Danish Unified Patent Court membership referendum

Option	Votes	%
✓ YES	10,709	62.68
X NO	6,377	37.32

2009 Danish Act of Succession referendum

Option	Votes	%
✓ YES	15,308	85.32
X NO	2,633	14.68

1953 Danish constitutional and electoral age referendum

Option	Votes	%
✓ YES	8,230	89.34
X NO	982	10.66
23 years	5,286	55.97
21 years	4,158	44.03

1939 Danish constitutional referendum

Option	Votes	%
✓ YES	4,198	87.84
X NO	581	12.16
