= Constituencies of Denmark =

Constituencies used for elections to the Folketing

- Category: Electoral district
- Location: Denmark
- Number: 12
- Government: Folketing

Constituencies (Danish: valgkredse) are used for elections to the Folketing, the national parliament of Denmark. Denmark proper is divided into 10 constituencies largely corresponding to the Provinces of Denmark, (which themselves are statistical divisions of the regions of the country) each electing multiple members using open-list proportional representation. Those constituencies are then divided into 92 opstillingskredse (nomination districts) which mainly serve the purpose of nominating candidates, but historically functioned as single-member constituencies electing one member using plurality voting. The Faroe Islands and Greenland are each a constituency, electing the North Atlantic mandates (da).

== List of constituencies (2007 onwards) ==
The following is the list of constituencies used from 2007 onwards.

List of constituencies since 2007
Division	Constituency	Municipalities	Population	Electorate	Constituency seats
Capital	Copenhagen	Copenhagen, Frederiksberg, Dragør and Tårnby	819,428	549,738	17
Capital	Greater Copenhagen	Albertslund, Ballerup, Brøndby, Gentofte, Gladsaxe, Glostrup, Herlev, Hvidovre, Høje-Taastrup, Ishøj, Lyngby-Taarbæk, Rødovre and Vallensbæk	565,115	371,089	11
Capital	North Zealand	Allerød, Egedal, Fredensborg, Frederikssund, Furesø, Gribskov, Halsnæs, Helsingør, Hillerød, Hørsholm and Rudersdal	474,240	341,547	10
Capital	Bornholm	Bornholm with Ertholmene	39,643	30,825	2
Zealand & Southern Denmark	Zealand	Greve, Køge, Lejre, Roskilde, Solrød, Faxe, Guldborgsund, Holbæk, Kalundborg, Lolland, Næstved, Odsherred, Ringsted, Slagelse, Sorø, Stevns and Vordingborg	850,230	634,544	20
Zealand & Southern Denmark	Funen	Assens, Faaborg, Kerteminde, Langeland, Middelfart, Nordfyn, Nyborg, Odense, Svendborg and Ærø	505,101	378,834	12
Zealand & Southern Denmark	South Jutland	Billund, Esbjerg, Fanø, Fredericia, Haderslev, Kolding, Sønderborg, Tønder, Varde, Vejen, Vejle and Aabenraa	733,151	526,564	17
Mid & Northern Jutland	East Jutland	Favrskov, Hedensted, Horsens, Norddjurs, Odder, Randers, Samsø, Skanderborg, Syddjurs and Aarhus	829,666	602,867	18
Mid & Northern Jutland	West Jutland	Herning, Holstebro, Ikast, Lemvig, Ringkøbing-Skjern, Silkeborg, Skive, Struer and Viborg	530,388	385,530	13
Mid & Northern Jutland	North Jutland	Brønderslev, Frederikshavn, Hjørring, Jammerbugt, Læsø, Mariagerfjord, Morsø, Rebild, Thisted, Vesthimmerland and Aalborg	594,426	447,557	15
Faroe Islands		All in Faroe Islands	53,941	37,264	2
Greenland		All in Greenland	56,609	41,305	2

The Faroe Islands has been one single constituency since 1850. Since 1947 it has elected two members using proportional representation. Greenland has been represented by two members since 1953. Prior to 1975, it was divided into two single-member constituencies.

From the April 1920 Danish Folketing election until the reforms creating the current regions of Denmark in 2007, the constituencies were largely based on the counties. Each of the counties formed county constituencies (Danish: amtskredse). Bornholm remained a county constituency after it became a municipality with county functions in 2003. The exception was Copenhagen (Copenhagen and Frederiksberg Municipalities), which was divided into 3 regional constituencies (Danish: storkredse), the term used for constituencies throughout the country from 2007 onwards.

== List of nomination districts ==
=== A. Capital Division ===
==== Copenhagen ====
1. Østerbro
2. Sundbyvester
3. Inner City
4. Sundbyøster
5. Nørrebro
6. Bispebjerg
7. Brønshøj
8. Valby
9. Vesterbro
10. Falkoner
11. Slots
12. Tårnby

==== Greater Copenhagen ====
1. Gentofte
2. Lyngby
3. Gladsaxe
4. Rødovre
5. Hvidovre
6. Brøndby
7. Taastrup
8. Ballerup

==== North Zealand ====
1. Helsingør
2. Fredensborg
3. Hillerød
4. Frederikssund
5. Egedal
6. Rudersdal

==== Bornholm ====
1. Rønne
2. Aakirkeby

=== B. Zealand & Southern Denmark ===
==== Zealand ====
1. Lolland
2. Guldborgsund
3. Vordingborg
4. Næstved
5. Faxe
6. Køge
7. Greve
8. Roskilde
9. Holbæk
10. Kalundborg
11. Ringsted
12. Slagelse

==== Funen ====
1. Odense East
2. Odense West
3. Odense South
4. Assens
5. Middelfart
6. Nyborg
7. Svendborg
8. Faaborg

==== South Jutland ====
1. Sønderborg
2. Aabenraa
3. Tønder
4. City of Esbjerg
5. Greater Esbjerg
6. Varde
7. Vejen
8. Vejle North
9. Vejle South
10. Fredericia
11. Kolding North
12. Kolding South
13. Haderslev

=== C. Mid & Northern Jutland ===
==== East Jutland ====
1. Aarhus South
2. Aarhus West
3. Aarhus North
4. Aarhus East
5. Djurs
6. Randers North
7. Randers South
8. Favrskov
9. Skanderborg
10. Horsens
11. Hedensted

==== West Jutland ====
1. Struer
2. Skive
3. Viborg West
4. Viborg East
5. Silkeborg North
6. Silkeborg South
7. Ikast
8. Herning South
9. Herning North
10. Holstebro
11. Ringkøbing

==== North Jutland ====
1. Frederikshavn
2. Hjørring
3. Brønderslev
4. Thisted
5. Himmerland
6. Mariagerfjord
7. Aalborg East
8. Aalborg West
9. Aalborg North

== 1971-2005 ==
The following constituencies were used in the elections between 1971 and 2005.

The constituencies used between 1971 and 2005

Constituency	Counties	Constituency seats (2005)
Søndre Storkreds	Copenhagen Municipality (part)	4
Østre Storkreds	Copenhagen Municipality (part)	6
Vestre Storkreds	Copenhagen Municipality (part) and Frederiksberg Municipality.	4
Copenhagen County	Copenhagen	14
Frederiksborg	Frederiksborg	9
Roskilde	Roskilde	5
Vestsjælland	West Zealand	8
Storstrøm	Storstrøm	7
Bornholm	Bornholm	2
Fyn	Funen	12
Sønderjylland	South Jutland	7
Ribe	Ribe	6
Vejle	Vejle	9
Ringkøbing	Ringkjøbing	7
Århus	Aarhus	16
Viborg	Viborg	6
Nordjylland	North Jutland	13

=== Previous nominating districts (1971-2005) ===
==== Copenhagen ====
1. Ryvang (Østre)
2. Christianshavn (Søndre)
3. Rådhus (Søndre)
4. Sundby (Søndre)
5. Blågård (Søndre)
6. Østbane (Østre)
7. Husum (Østre)
8. Valby (Vestre)
9. Amagerbro (Søndre)
10. Østerbro (Østre)
11. Nørrebro (Østre)
12. Bispeeng (Østre)
13. Vesterbro (Vestre)
14. Enghave (Vestre)
15. Bispebjerg (Østre)
16. Brønshøj (Østre)

==== Frederiksberg ====
1. Gl. Kongevej (Vestre)
2. Slots (Vestre)
3. Falkoner (Vestre)

==== Københavns Amt ====
1. Gentofte (Gentofte)
2. Lyngby (Lyngby-Taarbæk & Søllerød)
3. Ballerup (Ballerup, Ledøje-Smørum & Værløse)
4. Glostrup (Albertslund, Glostrup, Høje-Taastrup, Ishøj & Vallensbæk)
5. Hellerup (Gentofte)
6. Gladsakse (Gladsakse)
7. Hvidovre (Brøndby & Hvidovre)
8. Amager (Dragør & Tårnby)
9. Rødovre (Herlev & Rødovre)

==== Frederiksborg ====
1. Helsingør (Helsingør)
2. Fredensborg (Birkerød, Fredensborg-Humlebæk, Græsted-Gilleleje, Hørsholm & Karlebo)
3. Hillerød (Allerød, Farum, Hillerød, Slangerup, Stenløse & Ølstykke)
4. Frederiksværk (Frederikssund, Frederiksværk, Helsinge, Hundested, Jægerspris, Skibby & Skævinge)

==== Roskilde ====
1. Roskilde (Gundsø & Roskilde)
2. Køge (Greve, Køge, Solrød & Vallø)
3. Lejre (Bramsnæs, Hvalsø, Lejre, Ramsø & Skovbo)

==== Vestsjælland ====
1. Holbæk (Holbæk, Jernløse, Tornved & Tølløse)
2. Nykøbing (Bjergsted, Dragsholm, Nykøbing-Rørvig, Svinninge, Trundholm)
3. Kalundborg (Gørlev, Hvidebæk, Høng & Kalundborg)
4. Ringsted (Dianalund, Haslev, Ringsted & Stenlille)
5. Sorø (Fuglebjerg, Hashøj, Skælskør & Sorø)
6. Slagelse (Korsør & Slagelse)

==== Storstrøm ====
1. Præstø (Fakse, Fladså, Præstø, Rønnede & Stevns)
2. Næstved (Holmegaard, Næstved & Suså)
3. Vordingborg (Langebæk, Møn & Vordingborg)
4. Nakskov (Højreby, Nakskov, Ravnsborg & Rudbjerg)
5. Maribo (Holeby, Maribo, Nysted, Rødby & Sakskøbing)
6. Nykøbing (Nykøbing F., Nørre Alslev, Stubbekøbing & Sydfalster)

==== Bornholm ====
1. Rønne (Hasle & Rønne)
2. Åkirkeby (Allinge-Gudhjem, Christiansø, Nexø & Åkirkeby)

==== Fyn ====
1. Odense Øst (Odense)
2. Odense Vest (Odense)
3. Odense Syd (Odense)
4. Kerteminde (Kerteminde, Langeskov, Munkebo, Ullerslev & Årslev)
5. Middelfart (Assens, Ejby, Glamsbjerg, Middelfart & Nørre Aaby)
6. Otterup (Bogense, Otterup, Søndersø, Tommerup, Vissenbjerg & Aarup)
7. Nyborg (Egebjerg, Gudme, Nyborg, Ryslinge & Ørbæk)
8. Svendborg (Rudkøbing, Svendborg, Sydlangeland & Tranekær)
9. Fåborg (Broby, Fåborg, Haarby, Marstal, Ringe & Ærøskøbing)

==== Sønderjylland ====
1. Haderslev (Christiansfeld & Haderslev)
2. Åbenrå (Lundtoft, Rødekro & Aabenraa)
3. Sønderborg (Broager, Gråsten & Sønderborg)
4. Augustenborg (Augustenborg, Nordborg, Sundeved & Sydals)
5. Tønder (Bredebro, Højer, Skærbæk & Tønder)
6. Løgumkloster (Bov, Løgumkloster, Nørre-Rangstrup & Tinglev)
7. Rødding (Gram, Rødding & Vojens)

==== Ribe ====
1. Varde (Blaabjerg, Blåvandshuk, Varde & Ølgod)
2. Esbjerg (Esbjerg & Fanø)
3. Ribe (Bramming, Helle & Ribe)
4. Grindsted (Billund, Brørup, Grindsted, Holsted & Vejen)

==== Vejle ====
1. Fredericia (Børkop & Fredericia)
2. Kolding (Kolding, Lunderskov & Vamdrup)
3. Vejle (Jelling & Vejle)
4. Give (Brædstrup, Egtved, Give & Nørre-Snede)
5. Juelsminde (Hedensted, Juelsminde & Tørring-Uldum)
6. Horsens (Gedved & Horsens)

==== Ringkøbing ====
1. Ringkøbing (Holmsland, Lemvig, Ringkøbing, Thyborøn-Harboøre, Trehøje & Ulfborg-Vemb)
2. Holstebro (Aulum-Haderup, Holstebro, Struer, Thyholm & Vinderup)
3. Herning (Herning & Ikast)
4. Skjern (Brande, Egvad, Skjern, Videbæk & Aaskov)

==== Århus ====
1. Århus Øst (Århus)
2. Århus Nord (Århus)
3. Århus Syd (Århus)
4. Århus Vest (Århus)
5. Mariager (Langå, Mariager, Nørhald, Purhus & Sønderhald)
6. Randers (Randers)
7. Hammel (Galten, Hadsten, Hammel, Hinnerup, Rosenholm & Rønde)
8. Grenå (Ebeltoft, Grenaa, Midtdjurs, Nørre Djurs & Rougsø)
9. Skanderborg (Hørning, Odder, Samsø & Skanderborg)
10. Silkeborg (Gjern, Ry, Silkeborg & Them)

==== Viborg ====
1. Thisted (Hanstholm, Sydthy & Thisted)
2. Morsø (Morsø)
3. Skive (Fjends, Sallingsund, Skive, Spøttrup & Sundsøre)
4. Viborg (Møldrup, Tjele, Viborg & Aalestrup)
5. Kjellerup (Bjerringbro, Hvorslev, Karup & Kjellerup)

==== Nordjylland ====
1. Frederikshavn (Frederikshavn, Læsø & Skagen)
2. Sæby (Brønderslev, Dronninglund & Sæby)
3. Hjørring (Hirtshals, Hjørring & Sindal)
4. Fjerritslev (Brovst, Fjerritslev, Løkken-Vrå & Pandrup)
5. Ålborg Nord (Ålborg, Hals & Aabykro)
6. Ålborg Vest (Ålborg)
7. Ålborg Øst (Ålborg)
8. Hobro (Arden, Hadsund, Hobro, Sejlflod & Skørping)
9. Års (Farsø, Løgstør, Nibe, Nørager, Støvring & Års)

== 1920-1968 ==
The following constituencies were used in the elections between 1920 and 1968.

The constituencies used between 1920 and 1968

Constituency	Counties	Constituency seats (1968)
Søndre Storkreds	Copenhagen Municipality (part)	5
Østre Storkreds	Copenhagen Municipality (part)	10
Vestre Storkreds	Copenhagen Municipality (part) and Frederiksberg Municipality.	7
Københavns Amt	Copenhagen	15
Frederiksborg	Frederiksborg	5
Holbæk	Holbæk	4
Sorø	Sorø	4
Præstø	Præstø	4
Bornholm	Bornholm	2
Maribo	Maribo	4
Odense	Odense	7
Svendborg	Svendborg	5
Hjørring	Hjørring	6
Thisted	Thisted	3
Ålborg	Aalborg	7
Viborg	Viborg	5
Randers	Randers	5
Århus	Århus	6
Skanderborg	Skanderborg	4
Vejle	Vejle	7
Ringkøbing	Ringkjøbing	7
Ribe	Ribe	6
Haderslev (Note: Officially "Haderslev m. fl. Amter" or "Haderslev—Aabenraa—Sonderborg—Tønder")	Aabenraa, Haderslev, Sønderborg, Tønder	7

=== Previous nominating districts (1918-1968) ===
The following districts were used as nominating districts between 1918 and 1968. In the 1918 election the districts outside of Copenhagen and Frederiksberg functioned as single-member constituencies, electing a single member. In 1950 four nomination districts were created in Copenhagen and Copenhagen County. 1953 one nomination district was created in Copenhagen County and two nomination districts in Copenhagen - Valby and Sundby - were divided into two new nomination districts. In 1966 two nomination districts were created in Copenhagen County.

Note that the nomination districts in Odense, Aalborg, and Århus were not officially distinguished in their name by anything but their number. Their relative geographical location have been added in parentheses for clarity.

==== Copenhagen ====
1. Vesterbro (Vestre)
2. Christianshavn (Søndre)
3. Rådhus (Søndre)
4. Ravnsborg (Østre)
5. Blågård (Søndre)
6. Østbane (Østre)
7. Rosenborg (Søndre)
8. Havne (Søndre)
9. Sundby (Søndre) from 1953 known as Sundby-nord
10. Østerbro (Østre)
11. Nørrebro (Østre)
12. Bispeeng (Østre)
13. Enghave (Vestre)
14. Valby (Vestre) from 1953 known as Valby-øst
15. Bispebjerg (Østre)
16. Ryvang (Østre from 1950)
17. Brønshøj (Østre from 1950)
18. Sundby-syd (Søndre from 1953)
19. Valby-vest (Vestre from 1953)

==== Frederiksberg ====
1. Gl. Kongevej (Vestre)
2. Slots (Vestre)
3. Falkoner (Vestre)

==== Københavns Amt ====
1. Gentofte
2. Lyngby
3. Roskilde
4. Køge
5. Lejre
6. Hellerup (From 1950)
7. Gladsakse (From 1950)
8. Hvidovre (From 1953)
9. Amager (From 1966)
10. Rødovre (From 1966)

==== Frederiksborg ====
1. Helsingør
2. Fredensborg
3. Hillerød
4. Frederiksværk

==== Holbæk ====
1. Holbæk
2. Nykøbing
3. Vedby
4. Kalundborg-Onsbjerg

==== Sorø ====
1. Ringsted
2. Sorø
3. Slagelse
4. Skelskør

==== Præstø ====
1. Storeheddinge
2. Præstø
3. Næstved
4. Stege-Vordingborg

==== Bornholm ====
1. Rønne
2. Åkirkeby

==== Maribo ====
1. Nakskov
2. Maribo
3. Sakskøbing
4. Nykøbing
5. Stubbekøbing

==== Odense ====
1. Odense (North)
2. Odense (South)
3. Kerteminde
4. Assens
5. Middelfart
6. Bogense
7. Otterup

==== Svendborg ====
1. Nyborg
2. Gudme
3. Svendborg
4. Ærøskøbing-Faaborg
5. Højrup
6. Rudkøbing

==== Hjørring ====
1. Frederikshavn
2. Sæby
3. Hjørring
4. Vraa
5. Halvrimme

==== Thisted ====
1. Thisted
2. Hurup
3. Nykøbing

==== Aalborg ====
1. Aalborg (West)
2. Aalborg (East)
3. Bællum
4. Aars
5. Nibe
6. Nørresundby

==== Viborg ====
1. Skive
2. Viborg
3. Kjellerup
4. Søndervinge
5. Løvel

==== Randers ====
1. Mariager
2. Randers
3. Borup
4. Hornslet
5. Grenaa
6. Æbeltoft

==== Aarhus ====
1. Odder
2. Århus (Mid)
3. Århus (North)
4. Århus (South)
5. Skjoldelev

==== Skanderborg ====
1. Horsens
2. Skanderborg
3. Østbirk
4. Silkeborg

==== Vejle ====
1. Fredericia
2. Kolding
3. Vejle
4. Give
5. Bjerre
6. Vonsild

==== Ringkøbing ====
1. Ringkøbing
2. Lemvig
3. Holstebro
4. Vinderup
5. Herning
6. Skjern

==== Ribe ====
1. Varde
2. Esbjerg
3. Ribe
4. Bække
5. Guldager

==== Sønderjylland (From 1920) ====
1. Haderslev
2. Aabenraa
3. Sønderborg
4. Augustenborg
5. Tønder
6. Løgumkloster
7. Rødding
