= The Citizen List =

The Citizen List Borgerlisten
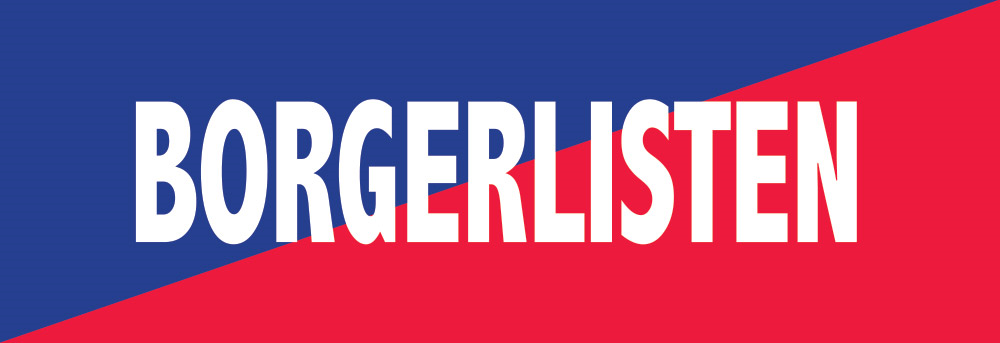
- Leader: Klaus Riskær Pedersen
- Founded: 25 October 2018 (Klaus Riskær Pedersen party); 19 December 2019 (The Citizen List)
- Dissolved: 2023
- Headquarters: Gammel Strand 42 (3), Copenhagen K
- Ideology: Populism; Paternalistic conservatism Social liberalism Tax reform
- Political position: Centre to centre-right
- Colours: Blue and red Green (former); Grey-green (former)
- Folketing: 0 / 179 (Note: Only 175 of the 179 seats in the Danish Parliament, the Folketing, are obtainable by Danish political parties as Greenland and the Faroe Islands are assigned two seats each due to their status as territories in the Kingdom of Denmark.)

Election symbol
- E

The Citizen List (Danish: Borgerlisten) was a centre-right political party in Denmark. Under the name Klaus Riskær Pedersen Party, after its founder Klaus Riskær Pedersen, it entered the 2019 general election, failing to win any seats. Following the defeat, Riskær announced that the party would not again stand in an election, but later reversed that decision. In December 2019 he changed the party's name to its current name.

In 2023, the party was dissolved.

== Background ==
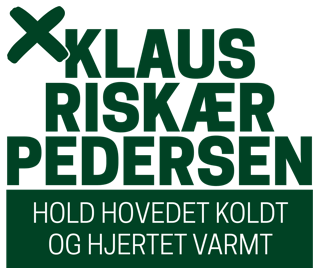
Klaus Riskær Pedersen party logo

In 1989, Klaus Riskær Pedersen ran in the European Parliament election for Venstre. Although fifth on the ballot, he received enough votes to become one of Venstre's three representatives in the European Parliament. Riskær declared bankruptcy in 1992 and in 1993 he was excluded from Venstre. He continued in the European Parliament as an independent politician. He founded the party De liberale 2000 (The Liberal 2000) and intended to run for the next European Parliament election, but did not manage to gather enough signatures to do so. In 2000, Riskær was sentenced two years in prison for fraud. This sentence was later prolonged.

In 2014, Riskær published the book Socialkapitalisme (Social Capitalism), proving a change in his previous political stance. In the book, Riskær argues that the market has to be influenced by certain regards, requiring taxing and market regulation. Riskær joined The Alternative in 2015, but was kicked out after one week of membership. In 2018, he attempted to join the Christian Democrats. Stig Grenov, the party's leader, decided to not respond to the request.

== History ==
Former logo

In 2018, after his failed attempts to join politics through other parties, Riskær founded his own party, naming it after himself. In February 2019, after just 118 days, he had collected the necessary voter declarations to be on the ballot in the upcoming general election. The collection of the signatures broke the rules – Riskær found a way to circumvent a 7-day "thinking period" between a voter noting their support for a party and then confirming their signature in the online collection system. Even though the rules did not allow this, they contained no possibility of sanctions. Following this, all political parties in the Folketing agreed to close the loophole and build a new portal for declarations, expected to be available in the end 2020.

At the election on 5 June 2019, the party gained 0.8% of the votes, below the election threshold of 2%. On the election night, Riskær announced that he would not contest another election, and the following day that the organization instead would seek political influence through other means.

In October 2019, he announced that he had changed his mind, and that he would contest the next election, if it happens before his ballot access expires in August 2020. At the same time, he said that he would likely start collecting signatures to be able to run again after that date. In December, he changed the party's name to The Citizen List, and said he would start collecting signatures in the new year.

By 2023, the party had been dissolved.

== Election results ==
=== Parliament ===
Date	Votes			Seats	
Date	#	%	± pp	#	±
2019	29,617	0.8 #13	+0.8	0 / 179	New
