= 2014 Danish Unified Patent Court membership referendum =

- 25 May 2014

Results
Choice	Votes	%
Yes	1,386,881	62.47%
No	833,023	37.53%
Valid votes	2,219,904	96.36%
Invalid or blank votes	83,879	3.64%
Total votes	2,303,783	100.00%
Registered voters/turnout	4,124,696	55.85%
- Results by nomination district and constituency

A referendum on joining the Unified Patent Court was held in Denmark on 25 May 2014 alongside European Parliament elections. The referendum was approved with 62.5% of the vote, enabling the government to proceed with the ratification of the Agreement on a Unified Patent Court, which constitutes the legal basis for the Unified Patent Court. The court is from 1 June 2023 to be common to 17 Member States of the European Union for proceedings regarding European patents. Ratification of the agreement, which had already been approved by a simple majority of the Danish parliament, also renders the unitary patent applicable in Denmark.

== Background ==
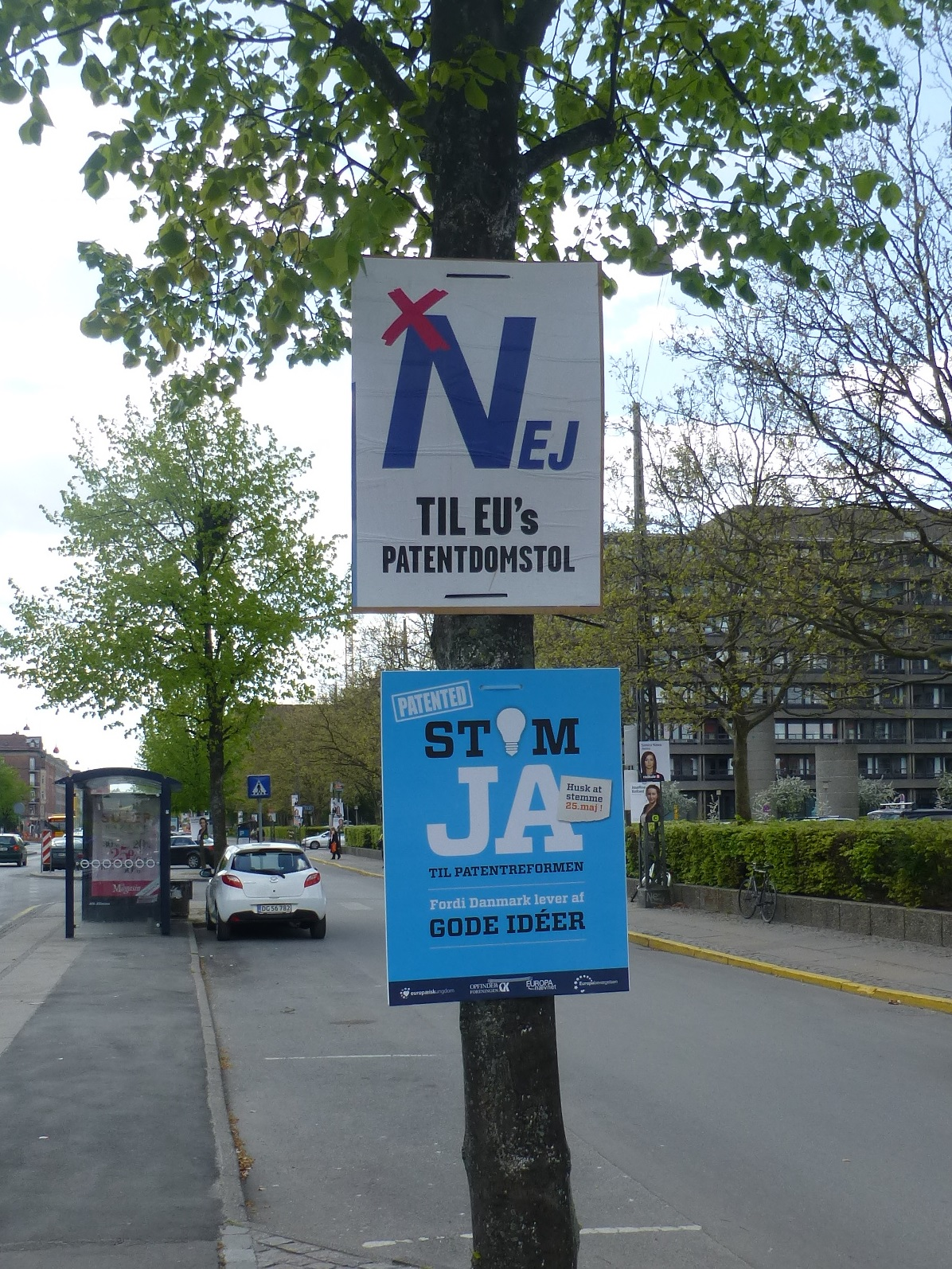
Election posters for the 2014 referendum

Denmark signed the Agreement on a Unified Patent Court on 19 February 2013 along with 24 of the (then) 27 Member States of the European Union eligible to join. The agreement shall enter into force for those countries that approved it after ratification of 13 states (which must include France, Germany and the United Kingdom) and an adaptation of the Brussels I regulation.

The Danish Ministry of Justice issued its opinion in May 2013 that a referendum or five-sixths majority in the Folketing was necessary for the government to ratify the agreement due to constitutional requirements on the transfer of sovereignty. The Danish People's Party (DF) and the Red–Green Alliance, collectively controlling around one-fifth of the Folketing seats, stated their opinion that a referendum should be held. The People's Party said they would support the UPC if the governing parties promised to either hold a referendum on the proposed European banking union or increase restrictions on the distribution of welfare benefits to foreign nationals in Denmark. Despite being implored to negotiate with the DF by the leader of the opposition Lars Løkke Rasmussen, the government opted to hold a referendum, announcing in December 2013 that one would go ahead on 25 May 2014.

The legal basis for the referendum was sections 20 and 42 of the Constitution of Denmark according to which a majority consisting of at least 30% of the electorate could reject the decision of the Folketing due to it involving transfer of sovereignty. In case this double majority criterion was not met, e.g. if 28% voted against the decision and 20% voted in favor (low voter turnout), the act as passed by the Folketing would still come into force, allowing the government to proceed with the ratification of the Agreement on a Unified Patent Court.

== Results ==
Danish Unified Patent Court membership referendum, 2014
Choice	Votes	%
For	1,386,881	62.47
Against	833,023	37.53
Total	2,219,904	100.00
Valid votes	2,219,904	96.36
Invalid/blank votes	83,879	3.64
Total votes	2,303,783	100.00
Registered voters/turnout	4,124,696	55.85
Source: Danmarks Statistik

The "no" votes equated to 20.2% of the electorate, less than the 30% threshold required (in conjunction with a plurality of voters voting "no") to reverse the decision of parliament to ratify.
