= 2009 Danish Act of Succession referendum =

A referendum on changing the Danish Act of Succession, the rules governing the succession to the Danish throne, was held in Denmark, the Faroe Islands, and Greenland on 7 June 2009, simultaneously with the election to the European Parliament, in Denmark proper.

The law, which passed with 85% of the popular vote, eliminates male-preference primogeniture in favour of absolute primogeniture, resulting in sons losing precedence over daughters in the line of succession. The law did not affect anyone in the line of succession at the time of the referendum: the Queen's two children are both male, as is the Crown Prince's eldest child, born in 2005. However, had the referendum not been successful, Prince Vincent, who was born in 2011, would have been higher in the line of succession than his elder sister Princess Isabella, born in 2007.

== In parliament ==
Under the rules for change of constitution, the law must be passed by two Parliaments, before and after an election, and then approved by a referendum. The law was passed in 2006 with only one abstention (Simon Emil Ammitzbøll of the Social Liberal Party, who later formed his own party, Borgerligt Centrum). The law was passed again by the new Folketing elected in 2007 on 24 February 2009 with two abstentions (of the left-wing Enhedslisten). It was then submitted to a referendum.

== Relation to constitution ==
No changes would be made to the constitution and §2 would continue to refer to the Act of Succession of 1953 even though that reference would become invalid. Jens Peter Christensen, then professor of administrative law at the University of Aarhus and now a member of the Danish Supreme Court, has described this as "a mess" and as an "overly clever" way for then–Prime Minister Anders Fogh Rasmussen to signal that the government will oppose any other changes to the constitution. At the same time Christensen emphasizes that he has no doubt that the procedure is legal.

Twoway diagram showing minimum combinations of voter turnout and votes in favour required to pass the law above the curve, and the actual referendum result indicated by the hexagon.

== Prognosis for referendum ==
Changes to the act of succession in Denmark follow the same rules as changes to the constitution. First, it must be passed by parliament, then passed in unchanged form by the next parliament following parliamentary elections, and then be submitted to a public referendum. In order for the law to be approved in the referendum, it must get both a majority of votes cast in favour and at least 40% of all eligible voters voting in favour. Although an opinion poll from May 2005 showed a majority of 77% in favour of the change, it would not guarantee passage of the bill. In fact turnout at the preceding European Parliament elections in 2004 was so low (47.6%), that even a 77% margin in favour would not take the proposal past the 40% threshold. However, turnout increased and at midnight on the election night with most votes counted, the threshold had been passed and the law was certain to pass.

== Campaign and positions ==
In late May, the government launched an official campaign. The Prime Minister's Department admitted the official campaign video is an imitation of a sketch from the British comedy show Harry Enfield's Television Programme.

Historian Steffen Heiberg alleged in a Ritzau story on 1 June 2009 that Queen Margrethe II herself was "rather opposed" to the change.

== Results ==
Results of the referendum by electoral district; all districts had at least 80% support.

As the electorate was 4,042,185, and the minimum threshold of passing was 40 percent of the electorate, at least 1,616,874 people must have voted in favor of the change, while maintaining a majority in votes cast. 85.4% voted for the change, whilst 14.6% voted against change. The referendum had a 58.3% turnout.

The number of blank and invalid votes was much higher in big cities, especially Copenhagen. If based on the local results from Copenhagen alone, the change would not have passed.

Prime Minister Lars Løkke Rasmussen stated that the referendum "was important for gender equality" and "a strong signal that shows that we want to be a society where men and women have the same opportunities, whether it is for ordinary people or princes and princesses".

Choice	Of eligible votes		Of electorate	
Choice	Votes	%	Votes	%
Yes, change the act of succession	1,858,211	85.35	1,858,211	45.16
No, do not change the act of succession	318,934	14.65	318,934	7.75
Total	2,177,145	100.00	2,177,145	100.00
Valid votes	2,177,145	90.71		
Invalid votes	16,808	0.70		
Blank votes	206,195	8.59		
Total votes	2,400,148	100.00		
Registered voters/turnout	4,114,789	58.33		
Source: Statistics Denmark
