= Danish opt-outs from the European Union =

Denmark holds opt-outs from European Union policies in relation to police and justice and the adoption of the euro. They were secured under the Edinburgh Agreement in 1992 after a referendum for the ratification of the Maastricht Treaty was rejected by Danish voters, as a package of measures to assuage concerns raised during that referendum.

The Danish government has held three referendums on modifying its opt-outs. The first in 2000 rejected the adoption of the euro by 53.2% to 46.8% on a turnout of 87.6%. The second in 2015 rejected converting Denmark's current full opt-out on home and justice matters into a case-by-case opt-out similar to that held by Ireland and the United Kingdom (the latter until its exit from the EU) by 53.1% to 46.9%. The third in 2022 abolished the defence opt-out with 66.9% voting yes, and 33.1% voting no.

As a result, as of November 2022, Denmark has had three opt-outs: the euro opt-out, the policing-justice opt-out, and the citizenship opt-out, of which the last has been superfluous since the Amsterdam Treaty in 1997.

== History ==
Denmark originally obtained four opt-outs from the Maastricht Treaty following the treaty's initial rejection in a 1992 referendum. These opt-outs are outlined in the Edinburgh Agreement and concern the Economic and monetary union (EMU), the Common Security and Defence Policy (CSDP), Justice and Home Affairs (then JHA, now PJCC) and the citizenship of the European Union. With these opt-outs the Danish people accepted the treaty in a second referendum held in 1993.

The EMU opt-out means that Denmark is not obliged to participate in the third phase of the European Exchange Rate Mechanism, that is, to replace the Danish krone with the euro. The abolition of the euro opt-out was put to a referendum in 2000 and was rejected.

The JHA opt-out exempts Denmark from certain areas of home affairs. Significant parts of these areas were transferred from the third European Union pillar to the first under the Amsterdam Treaty; Denmark's opt-outs from these areas were kept valid through additional protocols. Acts made under those powers are not binding on Denmark except for those relating to the Schengen Agreement, which are instead conducted on an intergovernmental basis with Denmark. Under the Treaty of Lisbon, Denmark can change its opt-out from a complete opt-out to the case-by-case opt-in version applying to Ireland and the United Kingdom (the latter until its exit from the EU) whenever they wish. The protocol governing this provision stipulates that if Denmark exercises this option, then it will be bound by the Schengen acquis under EU law rather than on an intergovernmental basis. The Danish electorate voted not to exercise these provisions in a 2015 referendum.

The CSDP opt-out originally meant Denmark would not be obliged to join the Western European Union (which originally handled the defence tasks of the EU). Later, it meant that Denmark did not participate in the European Union's foreign policy where defence was concerned. Hence, it did not take part in decisions, did not act in that area, and did not contribute troops to missions conducted under the auspices of the European Union. In a June 2022 referendum, the Danish electorate voted to fully abolish this opt-out and begin participating in the EU's defence operations as of 1 July 2022; hence, this opt-out is no longer in force.

The citizenship opt-out stated that European Union citizenship did not replace Danish national citizenship; this opt-out was rendered obsolete when the Amsterdam Treaty adopted the same provisions for all EU members.

=== Summary table ===
Treaty opt-outs of Denmark
Country	Number of opt‑outs	Policy area			
Country	Number of opt‑outs	Economic and Monetary Union (EMU)	Area of freedom, security and justice (AFSJ)		Security and Defence Policy (CSDP)
Country	Number of opt‑outs	Eurozone	General AFSJ	Schengen Area	Security and Defence Policy (CSDP)
Denmark	2	Opt-out (Note: Participates in ERM II.)	Opt-out	Intergovernmental	Former opt-out
Former opt-out: Opt-out that has been abolished.; Intergovernmental: Opt-out in EU treaties, but participates in policy area on the basis of an intergovernmental agreement.; Opt-out: Opt-out in EU treaties.

== Proposals to abolish the opt-outs ==
=== Anders Fogh Rasmussen government ===
One or more referendums on abolishing one or more the opt-outs were announced by Prime Minister Anders Fogh Rasmussen in his speech on 22 November 2007 after he won the 2007 parliamentary election. It was not announced whether the referendum would only offer a full repeal of all opt-outs, or a case-by-case choice, and no date was announced, except that it would be before the 2011 Danish parliamentary election. The V/K (Liberal-Conservative) government had been planning to hold a referendum on abolishing the opt-outs (or at least the euro opt-out) since at least 2004, following a favourable change in public opinion, but the discussions and controversy regarding the Treaty establishing a Constitution for Europe and the Treaty of Lisbon had delayed this.

The referendum was originally expected to be held in the autumn of 2008 but following Ireland's rejection of the Treaty of Lisbon, Fogh Rasmussen stated that this would not happen. In early 2009, it was announced that Fogh Rasmussen expected to hold a referendum on Denmark joining the Eurozone in 2010, as he believed it was possible to meet the demands of the Euro-sceptic Socialist People's Party.

=== Lars Løkke Rasmussen government ===
Following the appointment of Anders Fogh Rasmussen as Secretary General of NATO in 2009, his successor, Lars Løkke Rasmussen, announced that the opt-outs would be put to a referendum "when the time is right", which was seen as an indication that he did not necessarily intend to proceed with a referendum.

A month later, in May 2009, Løkke Rasmussen stated that he hoped at least a referendum on the common currency would take place before the parliamentary elections in 2011 so that Denmark could become "a full member of the European Union", and to give him a popular mandate in the negotiations over the Competitiveness Pact in the Summer of that year. The Prime Minister's suggestion was criticised by Jens Ladefoged Mortensen, a political scientist, who claimed that the time for a referendum was ill-chosen, pointing out that Denmark was set to hold general elections later that year.

In November 2009 the leaders of the three largest opposition parties Helle Thorning-Schmidt, Villy Søvndal and Margrethe Vestager suggested that a referendum on abolishing the opt-outs concerning the Common Security and Defence Policy and the Justice and Home Affairs be held on 23 March 2010.

Ultimately, no referendum was held and Løkke Rasmussen's coalition lost the election in the autumn of 2011.

=== Helle Thorning-Schmidt government ===
After the victory of the left-wing coalition under Thorning-Schmidt in the September 2011 elections, the new government announced that it planned to hold referendums on abolishing the defence opt-out and on either abolishing the justice opt-out or modifying it to a flexible opt-in like that of the United Kingdom and Ireland to allow Denmark to participate in measures which it chooses. However, in June 2012 Thorning-Schmidt announced that she didn't anticipate holding a referendum before a certain amount of stability and order returned to the situation in Europe, possibly not before the end of the government's term, citing the "anxiety and uncertainty" surrounding the European project at the time.

In August 2013, Lars Løkke Rasmussen, the leader of the opposition Venstre party proposed that a referendum on the opt-outs from EU defence and justice co-operation, as well as on the Unified Patent Court, leaving opt-outs from European citizenship and the euro, be held on the same date as the 2014 European election. The proposal was rejected by the Minister for European affairs, Nick Hækkerup, who argued that the timing was not right.

In October 2014 Thorning-Schmidt announced plans to hold a referendum on converting the inflexible opt-out on home and justice matters into a flexible opt-out following the next Danish general election due by September 2015, due to concerns that the opt-out would force Denmark to leave Europol. Several parties, including the two largest in parliament, the Social Democrats and Liberals, reached an agreement in December 2014 to hold the referendum following the upcoming election, but before the end of the first quarter of 2016, if they secured enough seats in the election. This was supplemented by an agreement in March 2015 amongst the parties that if the referendum is approved, Denmark would join 22 EU regulations it is currently not able to participate in, including the Rome Regulation. To join additional Regulations, the agreement requires either consensus amounts the parties to the agreement, or that the proposal is made public as part of the party's platform prior to a subsequent election.

=== Second Lars Løkke Rasmussen government ===
Following the election in June 2015, Venstre formed government with Lars Løkke Rasmussen again becoming prime minister. He committed to holding the referendum on converting the justice opt-out into an opt-in by Christmas 2015. On 21 August 2015, the Danish government announced that the referendum would be held on 3 December 2015. The government has also said it is planning on holding a referendum on abolishing its opt-out from the EU defence policy following the justice opt-out referendum. Danes rejected the proposal by a margin of 53.1% to 46.9%. In May 2019 Rasmussen again proposed a referendum on abolishing its defence opt-out during the following parliamentary term, though his party lost the general election the following month.

=== Frederiksen government ===
Following the Russian invasion of Ukraine, Denmark held a referendum on abolishing its defence opt-out. The referendum took place on 1 June 2022, ending with the yes side winning by two thirds of the vote. Following the referendum Denmark formally notified the EU of its renunciation of its opt-out on defence matters on June 20, which became effective from 1 July. Frederiksen stated that despite the approval of the eliminating the defence opt-out, she did not plan to hold referendums on the other remaining opt-outs.

== Opinion polls ==
A poll from early June 2008 saw a clear majority in favour of repealing the defence and judicial issues opt-outs, a very close race regarding the euro and a clear majority against repealing the citizenship opt-outs. Following an increase in support for abolishing the opt-outs, support dropped in mid-May 2009; in January 2009, 49.8% were in favour of having the euro as Danish currency, dropping to 45.2% against and 43.7% in favour in May 2009. Support for abolishing opt-outs on legal and defence cooperation has also dwindled to equal numbers pro and against.

Afterwards, support for abolishing the opt-outs increased again. In October 2009, there was a majority in favour of abolishing each of the four opt-outs, the only difference being in the size of majority:

- Absolute majorities were in favour of adopting the euro (50% in favour, 43% opposed, 7% no opinion) and participating in a Common European Defence policy (66% in favour, 21% opposed, 13% no opinion).
- There were relative majorities in favour of judicial cooperation (47% in favour, 35% opposed, 18% no opinion) and EU citizenship (40% in favour, 30% opposed, 30% no opinion).
- When asked, how they would vote when they had to decide about all four opt-outs in a package, a relative majority of 42% would vote in favour of abolishing the opt-outs, 37% would vote in favour of keeping the opt-outs and 21% expressed no opinion.

Following the European sovereign debt crisis, particularly the financial market turmoil of 2011, support for the euro dropped dramatically with a poll showing 61% of respondents opposing adoption of the euro, with 37% in favour.

== See also ==
- Denmark and the euro
- Opt-outs in the European Union
