= Ringsted (nomination district) =

- Ringsted
- Nomination district constituency for the Folketing
- Location of Ringsted within Zealand

- Location of Zealand within Denmark
- Municipalities: Ringsted; Sorø
- Constituency: Zealand
- Electorate: 48,173 (2022)

Current constituency
- Created: 1849 (as constituency); 1920 (as nomination district)

Ringsted nominating district is one of the 92 nominating districts that exists for Danish elections following the 2007 municipal reform. It consists of Ringsted and Sorø municipality. It was created in 1849 as a constituency, and has been a nomination district since 1920, though its boundaries have been changed since then.

In general elections, the district tends to vote a bit more for parties commonly associated with the blue bloc.

== General elections results ==
=== General elections in the 2020s ===
2022 Danish general election

Parties	Vote		
Parties	Votes	%	+ / -
Social Democrats	11,246	28.45	+2.51
Venstre	4,859	12.29	-11.66
Moderates	4,142	10.48	New
Green Left	3,879	9.81	+0.91
Denmark Democrats	3,289	8.32	New
Conservatives	2,706	6.85	+0.19
Liberal Alliance	2,429	6.14	+4.34
New Right	1,807	4.57	+2.07
Danish People's Party	1,404	3.55	-7.95
Red–Green Alliance	1,368	3.46	-2.17
Social Liberals	1,037	2.62	-3.72
The Alternative	908	2.30	+0.13
Independent Greens	244	0.62	New
Christian Democrats	129	0.33	-0.59
Lisa Sofia Larsson	63	0.16	New
Rasmus Paludan	20	0.05	New
Total	39,530		

=== General elections in the 2010s ===
2019 Danish general election

Parties	Vote		
Parties	Votes	%	+ / -
Social Democrats	10,270	25.94	-0.04
Venstre	9,481	23.95	+4.54
Danish People's Party	4,552	11.50	-14.99
Green Left	3,522	8.90	+5.04
Conservatives	2,637	6.66	+3.38
Social Liberals	2,510	6.34	+2.81
Red–Green Alliance	2,230	5.63	-1.13
Stram Kurs	1,039	2.62	New
New Right	989	2.50	New
The Alternative	858	2.17	-1.72
Liberal Alliance	712	1.80	-4.48
Klaus Riskær Pedersen Party	411	1.04	New
Christian Democrats	363	0.92	+0.43
Pinki Karin Yvonne Jensen	18	0.05	New
Total	39,592		

2015 Danish general election

Parties	Vote		
Parties	Votes	%	+ / -
Danish People's Party	10,512	26.49	+10.41
Social Democrats	10,310	25.98	+1.63
Venstre	7,703	19.41	-7.33
Red–Green Alliance	2,684	6.76	+1.01
Liberal Alliance	2,493	6.28	+1.39
The Alternative	1,545	3.89	New
Green Left	1,532	3.86	-5.05
Social Liberals	1,402	3.53	-4.62
Conservatives	1,300	3.28	-1.30
Christian Democrats	193	0.49	+0.03
Aamer Ahmad	7	0.02	New
Bent A. Jespersen	6	0.02	-0.01
Michael Christiansen	3	0.01	New
Total	39,690		

2011 Danish general election

Parties	Vote		
Parties	Votes	%	+ / -
Venstre	10,673	26.74	-1.85
Social Democrats	9,716	24.35	-0.80
Danish People's Party	6,418	16.08	-0.55
Green Left	3,556	8.91	-2.84
Social Liberals	3,253	8.15	+4.04
Red–Green Alliance	2,296	5.75	+4.22
Liberal Alliance	1,951	4.89	+1.79
Conservatives	1,828	4.58	-4.04
Christian Democrats	185	0.46	-0.07
Bent A. Jespersen	13	0.03	New
Johan Isbrandt Haulik	12	0.03	New
Peter Lotinga	7	0.02	New
Total	39,908		

=== General elections in the 2000s ===
2007 Danish general election

Parties	Vote		
Parties	Votes	%	+ / -
Venstre	11,071	28.59	-2.83
Social Democrats	9,738	25.15	+0.57
Danish People's Party	6,441	16.63	+0.39
Green Left	4,552	11.75	+5.52
Conservatives	3,338	8.62	-0.03
Social Liberals	1,593	4.11	-3.59
New Alliance	1,199	3.10	New
Red–Green Alliance	591	1.53	-0.90
Christian Democrats	204	0.53	-0.80
Total	38,727		

2005 Danish general election

Parties	Vote		
Parties	Votes	%	+ / -
Venstre	11,422	31.42	-1.31
Social Democrats	8,936	24.58	-3.70
Danish People's Party	5,904	16.24	+2.52
Conservatives	3,143	8.65	+0.26
Social Liberals	2,800	7.70	+3.72
Green Left	2,266	6.23	-0.76
Red–Green Alliance	882	2.43	+0.96
Christian Democrats	483	1.33	-0.71
Centre Democrats	412	1.13	-0.65
Minority Party	96	0.26	New
Bent A. Jespersen	10	0.03	New
Total	36,354		

2001 Danish general election

Parties	Vote		
Parties	Votes	%	+ / -
Venstre	11,990	32.73	+8.24
Social Democrats	10,360	28.28	-8.55
Danish People's Party	5,026	13.72	+4.69
Conservatives	3,073	8.39	+0.59
Green Left	2,562	6.99	-0.31
Social Liberals	1,458	3.98	+0.69
Christian People's Party	747	2.04	-0.51
Centre Democrats	653	1.78	-3.23
Red–Green Alliance	537	1.47	-0.33
Progress Party	168	0.46	-0.90
Mark Hulstrøm	56	0.15	New
Total	36,630		

=== General elections in the 1990s ===
1998 Danish general election

Parties	Vote		
Parties	Votes	%	+ / -
Social Democrats	13,271	36.83	+0.22
Venstre	8,825	24.49	+0.95
Danish People's Party	3,253	9.03	New
Conservatives	2,812	7.80	-5.90
Green Left	2,629	7.30	+0.70
Centre Democrats	1,805	5.01	+1.37
Social Liberals	1,187	3.29	-1.27
Christian People's Party	918	2.55	+0.65
Red–Green Alliance	647	1.80	-1.02
Progress Party	491	1.36	-5.23
Democratic Renewal	183	0.51	New
Bent A. Jespersen	14	0.04	New
Total	36,035		

1994 Danish general election

Parties	Vote		
Parties	Votes	%	+ / -
Social Democrats	12,881	36.61	-2.05
Venstre	8,282	23.54	+7.53
Conservatives	4,821	13.70	-1.02
Green Left	2,321	6.60	-0.95
Progress Party	2,318	6.59	+0.27
Social Liberals	1,606	4.56	+0.66
Centre Democrats	1,279	3.64	-2.67
Red–Green Alliance	991	2.82	+1.54
Christian People's Party	667	1.90	-0.52
Grethe Lindberg	12	0.03	New
Henning Moth	7	0.02	New
Total	35,185		

1990 Danish general election

Parties	Vote		
Parties	Votes	%	+ / -
Social Democrats	13,198	38.66	+6.98
Venstre	5,465	16.01	+3.23
Conservatives	5,026	14.72	-4.45
Green Left	2,577	7.55	-3.67
Progress Party	2,158	6.32	-1.63
Centre Democrats	2,155	6.31	+1.27
Social Liberals	1,332	3.90	-2.17
Christian People's Party	825	2.42	+0.19
Common Course	557	1.63	+0.05
Red–Green Alliance	436	1.28	New
The Greens	295	0.86	-0.49
Justice Party of Denmark	102	0.30	New
Humanist Party	12	0.04	New
Total	34,138		

=== General elections in the 1980s ===
1988 Danish general election

Parties	Vote		
Parties	Votes	%	+ / -
Social Democrats	11,103	31.68	+0.24
Conservatives	6,718	19.17	-1.75
Venstre	4,479	12.78	+1.14
Green Left	3,934	11.22	-1.34
Progress Party	2,785	7.95	+4.33
Social Liberals	2,127	6.07	-0.78
Centre Democrats	1,768	5.04	+0.12
Christian People's Party	780	2.23	-0.31
Common Course	555	1.58	-0.45
The Greens	472	1.35	-0.09
Communist Party of Denmark	204	0.58	+0.01
Left Socialists	120	0.34	-0.41
Søren Barder	7	0.02	New
Total	35,052		

1987 Danish general election

Parties	Vote		
Parties	Votes	%	+ / -
Social Democrats	11,161	31.44	-1.98
Conservatives	7,427	20.92	-3.05
Green Left	4,459	12.56	+3.23
Venstre	4,132	11.64	-1.20
Social Liberals	2,433	6.85	+0.34
Centre Democrats	1,746	4.92	-0.16
Progress Party	1,285	3.62	+0.76
Christian People's Party	902	2.54	-0.53
Common Course	722	2.03	New
The Greens	512	1.44	New
Left Socialists	265	0.75	-0.30
Communist Party of Denmark	202	0.57	+0.18
Justice Party of Denmark	158	0.45	-0.87
Humanist Party	60	0.17	New
Socialist Workers Party	32	0.09	+0.02
Marxist–Leninists Party	8	0.02	-0.01
Total	35,504		

1984 Danish general election

Parties	Vote		
Parties	Votes	%	+ / -
Social Democrats	11,635	33.42	-1.73
Conservatives	8,345	23.97	+9.90
Venstre	4,470	12.84	-0.14
Green Left	3,248	9.33	+0.58
Social Liberals	2,267	6.51	+0.32
Centre Democrats	1,769	5.08	-3.85
Christian People's Party	1,070	3.07	+0.34
Progress Party	995	2.86	-4.86
Justice Party of Denmark	459	1.32	+0.15
Left Socialists	366	1.05	-0.51
Communist Party of Denmark	135	0.39	-0.19
Socialist Workers Party	26	0.07	+0.03
Bent E. Jespersen	15	0.04	New
Marxist–Leninists Party	11	0.03	New
Total	34,811		

1981 Danish general election

Parties	Vote		
Parties	Votes	%	+ / -
Social Democrats	11,282	35.15	-4.62
Conservatives	4,515	14.07	+1.51
Venstre	4,165	12.98	-1.69
Centre Democrats	2,866	8.93	+5.40
Green Left	2,809	8.75	+4.44
Progress Party	2,478	7.72	-1.69
Social Liberals	1,988	6.19	-0.50
Christian People's Party	875	2.73	-0.28
Left Socialists	501	1.56	-1.03
Justice Party of Denmark	375	1.17	-0.91
Communist Party of Denmark	186	0.58	-0.40
Communist Workers Party	42	0.13	-0.26
Socialist Workers Party	12	0.04	New
Kai Linde	2	0.01	New
Total	32,096		

=== General elections in the 1970s ===
1979 Danish general election

Parties	Vote		
Parties	Votes	%	+ / -
Social Democrats	13,037	39.77	+1.57
Venstre	4,810	14.67	+1.06
Conservatives	4,119	12.56	+4.87
Progress Party	3,086	9.41	-3.86
Social Liberals	2,193	6.69	+0.86
Green Left	1,413	4.31	+1.73
Centre Democrats	1,158	3.53	-3.18
Christian People's Party	986	3.01	-1.51
Left Socialists	849	2.59	+0.64
Justice Party of Denmark	683	2.08	-0.52
Communist Party of Denmark	321	0.98	-1.18
Communist Workers Party	127	0.39	New
Total	32,782		

1977 Danish general election

Parties	Vote		
Parties	Votes	%	+ / -
Social Democrats	12,130	38.20	+6.95
Venstre	4,321	13.61	-12.97
Progress Party	4,215	13.27	+2.47
Conservatives	2,443	7.69	+3.55
Centre Democrats	2,130	6.71	+4.67
Social Liberals	1,851	5.83	-4.23
Christian People's Party	1,435	4.52	-2.12
Justice Party of Denmark	825	2.60	+1.26
Green Left	819	2.58	-0.74
Communist Party of Denmark	686	2.16	-0.11
Left Socialists	619	1.95	+0.40
Pensioners' Party	280	0.88	New
Total	31,754		

1975 Danish general election

Parties	Vote		
Parties	Votes	%	+ / -
Social Democrats	9,571	31.25	+5.25
Venstre	8,140	26.58	+11.03
Progress Party	3,308	10.80	-2.67
Social Liberals	3,080	10.06	-4.74
Christian People's Party	2,035	6.64	+2.13
Conservatives	1,268	4.14	-3.41
Green Left	1,017	3.32	-0.77
Communist Party of Denmark	695	2.27	+0.49
Centre Democrats	625	2.04	-7.17
Left Socialists	475	1.55	+0.65
Justice Party of Denmark	409	1.34	-0.80
N. Vestergård Eriksen	3	0.01	New
Egon Larsen	0	0.00	New
Total	30,626		

1973 Danish general election

Parties	Vote		
Parties	Votes	%	+ / -
Social Democrats	7,896	26.00	-13.53
Venstre	4,723	15.55	-6.19
Social Liberals	4,495	14.80	-2.77
Progress Party	4,092	13.47	New
Centre Democrats	2,798	9.21	New
Conservatives	2,293	7.55	-4.18
Christian People's Party	1,371	4.51	+3.13
Green Left	1,241	4.09	-1.13
Justice Party of Denmark	649	2.14	+0.92
Communist Party of Denmark	542	1.78	+1.13
Left Socialists	274	0.90	-0.05
Total	30,374		

1971 Danish general election

Parties	Vote		
Parties	Votes	%	+ / -
Social Democrats	11,065	39.53	+1.23
Venstre	6,086	21.74	-0.71
Social Liberals	4,919	17.57	-0.21
Conservatives	3,284	11.73	-3.16
Green Left	1,462	5.22	+1.75
Christian People's Party	386	1.38	New
Justice Party of Denmark	342	1.22	+0.77
Left Socialists	267	0.95	-0.08
Communist Party of Denmark	181	0.65	+0.37
Total	27,992		

=== General elections in the 1960s ===
1968 Danish general election

Parties	Vote		
Parties	Votes	%	+ / -
Social Democrats	8,089	38.30	-4.38
Venstre	4,740	22.45	-1.74
Social Liberals	3,754	17.78	+6.50
Conservatives	3,145	14.89	+1.87
Green Left	733	3.47	-1.91
Liberal Centre	220	1.04	-0.81
Left Socialists	218	1.03	New
Justice Party of Denmark	94	0.45	+0.12
Independent Party	65	0.31	-0.76
Communist Party of Denmark	60	0.28	+0.08
Total	21,118		

1966 Danish general election

Parties	Vote		
Parties	Votes	%	+ / -
Social Democrats	8,743	42.68	-3.06
Venstre	4,955	24.19	-0.79
Conservatives	2,668	13.02	-0.68
Social Liberals	2,311	11.28	+1.36
Green Left	1,102	5.38	+3.03
Liberal Centre	378	1.85	New
Independent Party	220	1.07	-0.54
Justice Party of Denmark	68	0.33	-0.33
Communist Party of Denmark	41	0.20	-0.18
Total	20,486		

1964 Danish general election

Parties	Vote		
Parties	Votes	%	+ / -
Social Democrats	8,799	45.74	+0.38
Venstre	4,805	24.98	-0.11
Conservatives	2,636	13.70	+1.39
Social Liberals	1,909	9.92	-2.09
Green Left	452	2.35	+0.43
Independent Party	309	1.61	-0.26
Justice Party of Denmark	127	0.66	-0.43
Communist Party of Denmark	74	0.38	+0.03
Peace Politics People's Party	63	0.33	New
Danish Unity	61	0.32	New
Total	19,235		

1960 Danish general election

Parties	Vote		
Parties	Votes	%	+ / -
Social Democrats	8,012	45.36	+2.83
Venstre	4,431	25.09	-2.80
Conservatives	2,174	12.31	+1.41
Social Liberals	2,122	12.01	-2.86
Green Left	340	1.92	New
Independent Party	330	1.87	+1.07
Justice Party of Denmark	193	1.09	-0.94
Communist Party of Denmark	61	0.35	-0.63
Total	17,663		

=== General elections in the 1950s ===
1957 Danish general election

Parties	Vote		
Parties	Votes	%	+ / -
Social Democrats	7,325	42.53	-0.64
Venstre	4,804	27.89	+1.50
Social Liberals	2,562	14.87	-0.66
Conservatives	1,878	10.90	0.00
Justice Party of Denmark	350	2.03	+0.36
Communist Party of Denmark	169	0.98	-0.43
Independent Party	137	0.80	-0.12
Total	17,225		

September 1953 Danish Folketing election

Parties	Vote		
Parties	Votes	%	+ / -
Social Democrats	7,205	43.17	+1.80
Venstre	4,405	26.39	+0.76
Social Liberals	2,592	15.53	-1.87
Conservatives	1,820	10.90	-0.15
Justice Party of Denmark	278	1.67	-0.64
Communist Party of Denmark	236	1.41	-0.26
Independent Party	154	0.92	New
Total	16,690		

April 1953 Danish Folketing election

Parties	Vote		
Parties	Votes	%	+ / -
Social Democrats	6,574	41.37	+0.15
Venstre	4,072	25.63	+1.30
Social Liberals	2,765	17.40	-0.32
Conservatives	1,756	11.05	-0.80
Justice Party of Denmark	367	2.31	-0.90
Communist Party of Denmark	265	1.67	0.00
Danish Unity	91	0.57	New
Total	15,890		

1950 Danish Folketing election

Parties	Vote		
Parties	Votes	%	+ / -
Social Democrats	6,475	41.22	+4.49
Venstre	3,823	24.33	-6.14
Social Liberals	2,784	17.72	+3.14
Conservatives	1,861	11.85	+5.49
Justice Party of Denmark	505	3.21	-2.84
Communist Party of Denmark	262	1.67	-3.54
Total	15,710		

=== General elections in the 1940s ===
1947 Danish Folketing election

Parties	Vote		
Parties	Votes	%	+ / -
Social Democrats	5,615	36.73	+1.35
Venstre	4,658	30.47	+5.42
Social Liberals	2,229	14.58	-4.67
Conservatives	972	6.36	-5.92
Justice Party of Denmark	925	6.05	+5.11
Communist Party of Denmark	796	5.21	+0.01
Danish Unity	94	0.61	-1.29
Total	15,289		

1945 Danish Folketing election

Parties	Vote		
Parties	Votes	%	+ / -
Social Democrats	5,513	35.38	-5.33
Venstre	3,904	25.05	+3.25
Social Liberals	3,000	19.25	-0.40
Conservatives	1,914	12.28	-1.47
Communist Party of Denmark	810	5.20	New
Danish Unity	296	1.90	+1.05
Justice Party of Denmark	147	0.94	+0.11
Total	15,584		

1943 Danish Folketing election

Parties	Vote		
Parties	Votes	%	+ / -
Social Democrats	6,251	40.71	+2.04
Venstre	3,347	21.80	-0.31
Social Liberals	3,018	19.65	-0.88
Conservatives	2,112	13.75	+0.86
National Socialist Workers' Party of Denmark	302	1.97	-0.68
Danish Unity	130	0.85	+0.69
Justice Party of Denmark	128	0.83	-0.39
Farmers' Party	67	0.44	-0.02
Total	15,355		

=== General elections in the 1930s ===
1939 Danish Folketing election

Parties	Vote		
Parties	Votes	%	+ / -
Social Democrats	5,203	38.67	-2.82
Venstre	2,975	22.11	+3.31
Social Liberals	2,762	20.53	-1.28
Conservatives	1,734	12.89	-0.95
National Socialist Workers' Party of Denmark	356	2.65	+1.55
Justice Party of Denmark	164	1.22	-0.42
Communist Party of Denmark	159	1.18	+0.80
Farmers' Party	62	0.46	-0.49
Danish Unity	22	0.16	New
National Cooperation	17	0.13	New
Total	13,454		

1935 Danish Folketing election

Parties	Vote		
Parties	Votes	%	+ / -
Social Democrats	5,415	41.49	+2.65
Social Liberals	2,847	21.81	-1.15
Venstre	2,453	18.80	-5.54
Conservatives	1,806	13.84	+1.20
Justice Party of Denmark	214	1.64	+0.61
National Socialist Workers' Party of Denmark	143	1.10	New
Independent People's Party	124	0.95	New
Communist Party of Denmark	49	0.38	+0.25
Total	13,051		

1932 Danish Folketing election

Parties	Vote		
Parties	Votes	%	+ / -
Social Democrats	4,871	38.84	+1.12
Venstre	3,053	24.34	-1.80
Social Liberals	2,879	22.96	-2.92
Conservatives	1,585	12.64	+2.78
Justice Party of Denmark	129	1.03	+0.63
Communist Party of Denmark	16	0.13	New
Parcelist J. P. Jensen	8	0.06	New
Total	12,541		

=== General elections in the 1920s ===
1929 Danish Folketing election

Parties	Vote		
Parties	Votes	%	+ / -
Social Democrats	4,600	37.72	+3.48
Venstre	3,187	26.14	-0.06
Social Liberals	3,156	25.88	-2.79
Conservatives	1,202	9.86	-0.67
Justice Party of Denmark	49	0.40	+0.04
Total	12,194		

1926 Danish Folketing election

Parties	Vote		
Parties	Votes	%	+ / -
Social Democrats	3,939	34.24	+3.16
Social Liberals	3,299	28.67	-4.22
Venstre	3,014	26.20	+1.22
Conservatives	1,212	10.53	+0.55
Justice Party of Denmark	41	0.36	+0.20
Total	11,505		

1924 Danish Folketing election

Parties	Vote		
Parties	Votes	%	+ / -
Social Liberals	3,678	32.89	-1.29
Social Democrats	3,476	31.08	+3.60
Venstre	2,793	24.98	-1.56
Conservatives	1,116	9.98	-1.39
Farmer Party	102	0.91	New
Justice Party of Denmark	18	0.16	New
Total	11,183		

September 1920 Danish Folketing election

Parties	Vote		
Parties	Votes	%	+ / -
Social Liberals	3,675	34.18	-3.05
Social Democrats	2,954	27.48	+4.43
Venstre	2,853	26.54	-1.93
Conservatives	1,222	11.37	+0.49
Industry Party	40	0.37	0.00
Danish Left Socialist Party	7	0.07	New
Total	10,751		

July 1920 Danish Folketing election

Parties	Vote		
Parties	Votes	%	+ / -
Social Liberals	3,331	37.23	-0.65
Venstre	2,547	28.47	+1.05
Social Democrats	2,062	23.05	+0.06
Conservatives	973	10.88	-0.54
Industry Party	33	0.37	+0.13
Total	8,946		

April 1920 Danish Folketing election

Parties	Vote	
Parties	Votes	%
Social Liberals	3,509	37.88
Venstre	2,540	27.42
Social Democrats	2,130	22.99
Conservatives	1,058	11.42
Industry Party	22	0.24
Carl Christensen	5	0.05
Total	9,264	

== European Parliament elections results ==
2024 European Parliament election in Denmark

Parties	Vote		
Parties	Votes	%	+ / -
Green Left	4,626	17.48	+4.91
Social Democrats	4,208	15.90	-5.80
Venstre	3,930	14.85	-8.08
Conservatives	2,754	10.41	+4.16
Denmark Democrats	2,166	8.19	New
Danish People's Party	2,146	8.11	-6.17
Liberal Alliance	1,683	6.36	+4.60
Moderates	1,623	6.13	New
Social Liberals	1,391	5.26	-2.71
Red–Green Alliance	1,363	5.15	-0.47
The Alternative	571	2.16	-0.63
Total	26,461		

2019 European Parliament election in Denmark

Parties	Vote		
Parties	Votes	%	+ / -
Venstre	6,920	22.93	+6.69
Social Democrats	6,550	21.70	+4.40
Danish People's Party	4,311	14.28	-17.45
Green Left	3,794	12.57	+2.25
Social Liberals	2,405	7.97	+2.50
Conservatives	1,886	6.25	-2.48
Red–Green Alliance	1,697	5.62	New
People's Movement against the EU	1,250	4.14	-3.41
The Alternative	841	2.79	New
Liberal Alliance	531	1.76	-0.89
Total	30,185		

2014 European Parliament election in Denmark

Parties	Vote		
Parties	Votes	%	+ / -
Danish People's Party	8,124	31.73	+13.99
Social Democrats	4,429	17.30	-2.84
Venstre	4,158	16.24	-4.74
Green Left	2,642	10.32	-5.82
Conservatives	2,235	8.73	-3.80
People's Movement against the EU	1,934	7.55	+1.17
Social Liberals	1,400	5.47	+2.18
Liberal Alliance	678	2.65	+2.09
Total	25,600		

2009 European Parliament election in Denmark

Parties	Vote		
Parties	Votes	%	+ / -
Venstre	5,485	20.98	+0.62
Social Democrats	5,265	20.14	-12.29
Danish People's Party	4,637	17.74	+9.46
Green Left	4,220	16.14	+8.95
Conservatives	3,277	12.53	+1.71
People's Movement against the EU	1,668	6.38	+1.13
Social Liberals	860	3.29	-2.40
June Movement	585	2.24	-6.83
Liberal Alliance	147	0.56	New
Total	26,144		

2004 European Parliament election in Denmark

Parties	Vote		
Parties	Votes	%	+ / -
Social Democrats	6,273	32.43	+12.72
Venstre	3,938	20.36	-2.10
Conservatives	2,093	10.82	+3.00
June Movement	1,755	9.07	-7.64
Danish People's Party	1,601	8.28	+2.63
Green Left	1,390	7.19	+0.72
Social Liberals	1,101	5.69	-1.61
People's Movement against the EU	1,015	5.25	-2.04
Christian Democrats	176	0.91	-0.85
Total	19,342		

1999 European Parliament election in Denmark

Parties	Vote		
Parties	Votes	%	+ / -
Venstre	4,589	22.46	+2.83
Social Democrats	4,027	19.71	+1.89
June Movement	3,415	16.71	+1.01
Conservatives	1,598	7.82	-8.05
Social Liberals	1,491	7.30	-1.51
People's Movement against the EU	1,490	7.29	-2.83
Green Left	1,322	6.47	-0.31
Danish People's Party	1,155	5.65	New
Centre Democrats	987	4.83	+3.70
Christian Democrats	360	1.76	+0.58
Progress Party	126	0.62	-2.34
Total	20,434		

1994 European Parliament election in Denmark

Parties	Vote		
Parties	Votes	%	+ / -
Venstre	4,285	19.63	+1.72
Social Democrats	3,889	17.82	-7.18
Conservatives	3,464	15.87	+3.51
June Movement	3,428	15.70	New
People's Movement against the EU	2,209	10.12	-6.26
Social Liberals	1,924	8.81	+5.67
Green Left	1,480	6.78	-1.12
Progress Party	647	2.96	-1.38
Christian Democrats	257	1.18	-1.93
Centre Democrats	246	1.13	-8.73
Total	21,829		

1989 European Parliament election in Denmark

Parties	Vote		
Parties	Votes	%	+ / -
Social Democrats	4,771	25.00	+4.46
Venstre	3,417	17.91	+2.95
People's Movement against the EU	3,125	16.38	-2.11
Conservatives	2,358	12.36	-7.39
Centre Democrats	1,881	9.86	+2.45
Green Left	1,508	7.90	-0.06
Progress Party	828	4.34	+1.51
Social Liberals	599	3.14	-1.03
Christian Democrats	594	3.11	-0.03
Total	19,081		

1984 European Parliament election in Denmark

Parties	Vote	
Parties	Votes	%
Social Democrats	4,319	20.54
Conservatives	4,153	19.75
People's Movement against the EU	3,887	18.49
Venstre	3,145	14.96
Green Left	1,673	7.96
Centre Democrats	1,559	7.41
Social Liberals	877	4.17
Christian Democrats	660	3.14
Progress Party	595	2.83
Left Socialists	159	0.76
Total	21,027	

== Referendums ==
2022 Danish European Union opt-out referendum

Option	Votes	%
✓ YES	20,232	63.99
X NO	11,385	36.01

2015 Danish European Union opt-out referendum

Option	Votes	%
X NO	18,836	56.52
✓ YES	14,490	43.48

2014 Danish Unified Patent Court membership referendum

Option	Votes	%
✓ YES	15,477	61.59
X NO	9,652	38.41

2009 Danish Act of Succession referendum

Option	Votes	%
✓ YES	21,269	85.20
X NO	3,694	14.80

2000 Danish euro referendum

Option	Votes	%
X NO	20,883	56.41
✓ YES	16,138	43.59

1998 Danish Amsterdam Treaty referendum

Option	Votes	%
✓ YES	16,925	53.01
X NO	15,002	46.99

1993 Danish Maastricht Treaty referendum

Option	Votes	%
✓ YES	20,689	57.30
X NO	15,420	42.70

1992 Danish Maastricht Treaty referendum

Option	Votes	%
✓ YES	17,509	50.79
X NO	16,966	49.21

1986 Danish Single European Act referendum

Option	Votes	%
✓ YES	17,971	59.02
X NO	12,480	40.98

1972 Danish European Communities membership referendum

Option	Votes	%
✓ YES	21,060	70.35
X NO	8,877	29.65

1953 Danish constitutional and electoral age referendum

Option	Votes	%
✓ YES	12,183	89.88
X NO	1,372	10.12
23 years	7,292	51.70
21 years	6,813	48.30

1939 Danish constitutional referendum

Option	Votes	%
✓ YES	8,302	92.38
X NO	685	7.62
