= Lyngby (nomination district) =

- Lyngby
- Nomination district constituency for the Folketing
- Location of Gentofte within Greater Copenhagen

- Location of Greater Copenhagen within Denmark
- Municipalities: Lyngby-Taarbæk
- Constituency: Greater Copenhagen
- Electorate: 39,749 (2022)

Current constituency
- Created: 1849 (as constituency); 1920 (as nomination district)

Lyngby nominating district is one of the 92 nominating districts that exists for Danish elections following the 2007 municipal reform. It consists of Lyngby-Taarbæk Municipality. It was created in 1849 as a constituency, and has been a nomination district since 1920, though its boundaries have been changed on many occasions since then.

In general elections, the district tends to vote close to the national result when looking at the voter split between the two blocs.

== General elections results ==
=== General elections in the 2020s ===
2022 Danish general election

Parties	Vote		
Parties	Votes	%	+ / -
Social Democrats	6,551	19.06	+1.07
Moderates	4,650	13.53	New
Venstre	4,390	12.77	-7.11
Green Left	3,641	10.59	+1.62
Liberal Alliance	3,575	10.40	+6.75
Conservatives	3,560	10.36	-4.92
Social Liberals	2,655	7.72	-7.64
Red–Green Alliance	1,582	4.60	-1.42
The Alternative	1,343	3.91	+0.71
Danish People's Party	743	2.16	-2.29
New Right	739	2.15	+0.12
Denmark Democrats	619	1.80	New
Independent Greens	208	0.61	New
Christian Democrats	74	0.22	-0.61
Jovan Tasevski	34	0.10	New
Henrik Vendelbo Petersen	7	0.02	New
Total	34,371		

=== General elections in the 2010s ===
2019 Danish general election

Parties	Vote		
Parties	Votes	%	+ / -
Venstre	6,776	19.88	+1.48
Social Democrats	6,131	17.99	-5.35
Social Liberals	5,235	15.36	+6.36
Conservatives	5,209	15.28	+8.31
Green Left	3,057	8.97	+4.39
Red–Green Alliance	2,051	6.02	-0.58
Danish People's Party	1,518	4.45	-7.92
Liberal Alliance	1,244	3.65	-8.87
The Alternative	1,092	3.20	-2.58
New Right	692	2.03	New
Stram Kurs	413	1.21	New
Klaus Riskær Pedersen Party	300	0.88	New
Christian Democrats	282	0.83	+0.44
Mads Palsvig	79	0.23	New
Christian B. Olesen	1	0.00	New
Total	34,080		

2015 Danish general election

Parties	Vote		
Parties	Votes	%	+ / -
Social Democrats	7,904	23.34	+5.33
Venstre	6,231	18.40	-7.96
Liberal Alliance	4,239	12.52	+4.92
Danish People's Party	4,188	12.37	+4.12
Social Liberals	3,048	9.00	-6.89
Conservatives	2,360	6.97	-2.63
Red–Green Alliance	2,235	6.60	+0.69
The Alternative	1,956	5.78	New
Green Left	1,550	4.58	-3.45
Christian Democrats	133	0.39	+0.09
Asif Ahmad	19	0.06	New
Christian Olesen	2	0.01	New
Total	33,865		

2011 Danish general election

Parties	Vote		
Parties	Votes	%	+ / -
Venstre	8,989	26.36	+3.85
Social Democrats	6,141	18.01	-2.31
Social Liberals	5,420	15.89	+6.97
Conservatives	3,275	9.60	-9.18
Danish People's Party	2,815	8.25	-1.52
Green Left	2,740	8.03	-4.07
Liberal Alliance	2,591	7.60	+2.80
Red–Green Alliance	2,015	5.91	+3.58
Christian Democrats	103	0.30	-0.16
Christian H. Hansen	15	0.04	New
Total	34,104		

=== General elections in the 2000s ===
2007 Danish general election

Parties	Vote		
Parties	Votes	%	+ / -
Venstre	7,513	22.51	-8.84
Social Democrats	6,782	20.32	+4.55
Conservatives	6,269	18.78	-1.47
Green Left	4,040	12.10	+7.01
Danish People's Party	3,261	9.77	+0.61
Social Liberals	2,976	8.92	-4.01
New Alliance	1,601	4.80	New
Red–Green Alliance	779	2.33	-0.58
Christian Democrats	152	0.46	-0.64
Feride Istogu Gillesberg	4	0.01	New
Janus Kramer Møller	2	0.01	New
Total	33,379		

2005 Danish general election

Parties	Vote		
Parties	Votes	%	+ / -
Venstre	16,844	31.35	-6.08
Conservatives	10,879	20.25	+6.28
Social Democrats	8,471	15.77	-3.06
Social Liberals	6,947	12.93	+4.52
Danish People's Party	4,924	9.16	+0.85
Green Left	2,737	5.09	-0.83
Red–Green Alliance	1,565	2.91	+0.78
Centre Democrats	636	1.18	-1.80
Christian Democrats	592	1.10	-0.66
Minority Party	128	0.24	New
Nahid Yazdanyar	6	0.01	New
Total	53,729		

2001 Danish general election

Parties	Vote		
Parties	Votes	%	+ / -
Venstre	20,885	37.43	+9.77
Social Democrats	10,505	18.83	-4.07
Conservatives	7,793	13.97	-3.85
Social Liberals	4,690	8.41	+2.83
Danish People's Party	4,639	8.31	+1.84
Green Left	3,301	5.92	-0.98
Centre Democrats	1,664	2.98	-3.89
Red–Green Alliance	1,190	2.13	-0.32
Christian People's Party	982	1.76	-0.02
Progress Party	150	0.27	-0.74
Total	55,799		

=== General elections in the 1990s ===
1998 Danish general election

Parties	Vote		
Parties	Votes	%	+ / -
Venstre	15,449	27.66	+4.27
Social Democrats	12,791	22.90	+2.42
Conservatives	9,952	17.82	-11.44
Green Left	3,856	6.90	+0.52
Centre Democrats	3,840	6.87	+2.69
Danish People's Party	3,615	6.47	New
Social Liberals	3,117	5.58	-1.52
Red–Green Alliance	1,369	2.45	-0.31
Christian People's Party	997	1.78	+0.78
Progress Party	563	1.01	-2.94
Mogens Glistrup	158	0.28	-0.12
Democratic Renewal	148	0.26	New
Anders Kofoed	7	0.01	New
Poul Bregninge	1	0.00	New
Total	55,863		

1994 Danish general election

Parties	Vote		
Parties	Votes	%	+ / -
Conservatives	16,374	29.26	-1.09
Venstre	13,089	23.39	+7.26
Social Democrats	11,460	20.48	-3.46
Social Liberals	3,971	7.10	+0.31
Green Left	3,568	6.38	-0.76
Centre Democrats	2,339	4.18	-3.15
Progress Party	2,213	3.95	+0.96
Red–Green Alliance	1,547	2.76	+1.35
Christian People's Party	558	1.00	-0.23
Niels I. Meyer	510	0.91	New
Mogens Glistrup	226	0.40	New
Preben Møller Hansen	88	0.16	New
John Ziegler	13	0.02	New
Torben Faber	3	0.01	New
Total	55,959		

1990 Danish general election

Parties	Vote		
Parties	Votes	%	+ / -
Conservatives	16,712	30.35	-3.93
Social Democrats	13,186	23.94	+5.90
Venstre	8,880	16.13	+6.48
Centre Democrats	4,036	7.33	-0.16
Green Left	3,932	7.14	-3.19
Social Liberals	3,741	6.79	-2.49
Progress Party	1,644	2.99	-2.91
Red–Green Alliance	779	1.41	New
Common Course	689	1.25	+0.29
Christian People's Party	678	1.23	+0.15
The Greens	501	0.91	-1.03
Justice Party of Denmark	275	0.50	New
Humanist Party	16	0.03	New
Total	55,069		

=== General elections in the 1980s ===
1988 Danish general election

Parties	Vote		
Parties	Votes	%	+ / -
Conservatives	19,615	34.28	-0.59
Social Democrats	10,322	18.04	+0.73
Green Left	5,914	10.33	-1.26
Venstre	5,522	9.65	+3.40
Social Liberals	5,313	9.28	-1.88
Centre Democrats	4,284	7.49	-0.70
Progress Party	3,376	5.90	+2.37
The Greens	1,111	1.94	-0.01
Christian People's Party	616	1.08	-0.37
Common Course	549	0.96	-0.23
Communist Party of Denmark	314	0.55	-0.05
Left Socialists	278	0.49	-0.88
Leif Hilt	10	0.02	New
Total	57,224		

1987 Danish general election

Parties	Vote		
Parties	Votes	%	+ / -
Conservatives	20,184	34.87	-0.82
Social Democrats	10,020	17.31	-3.03
Green Left	6,710	11.59	+1.09
Social Liberals	6,459	11.16	+2.03
Centre Democrats	4,743	8.19	+2.64
Venstre	3,619	6.25	-2.73
Progress Party	2,041	3.53	+0.50
The Greens	1,128	1.95	New
Christian People's Party	839	1.45	-0.13
Left Socialists	791	1.37	-1.85
Common Course	690	1.19	New
Communist Party of Denmark	350	0.60	+0.07
Justice Party of Denmark	211	0.36	-1.03
Humanist Party	74	0.13	New
Socialist Workers Party	18	0.03	-0.01
Marxist–Leninists Party	6	0.01	-0.01
Carsten Grøn-Nielsen	6	0.01	0.00
Per Hillersborg	1	0.00	New
Total	57,890		

1984 Danish general election

Parties	Vote		
Parties	Votes	%	+ / -
Conservatives	20,989	35.69	+7.28
Social Democrats	11,961	20.34	-2.18
Green Left	6,178	10.50	-0.05
Social Liberals	5,369	9.13	+1.40
Venstre	5,283	8.98	+2.95
Centre Democrats	3,264	5.55	-3.43
Left Socialists	1,892	3.22	-0.52
Progress Party	1,782	3.03	-5.73
Christian People's Party	927	1.58	+0.71
Justice Party of Denmark	815	1.39	-0.05
Communist Party of Denmark	312	0.53	-0.29
Socialist Workers Party	24	0.04	+0.01
Marxist–Leninists Party	9	0.02	New
Carsten Grøn-Nielsen	8	0.01	New
Mogens Nebelong	2	0.00	-0.01
Poul Rasmussen	2	0.00	New
Total	58,817		

1981 Danish general election

Parties	Vote		
Parties	Votes	%	+ / -
Conservatives	15,978	28.41	+2.26
Social Democrats	12,666	22.52	-6.32
Green Left	5,934	10.55	+4.95
Centre Democrats	5,051	8.98	+4.84
Progress Party	4,929	8.76	-1.21
Social Liberals	4,346	7.73	-1.89
Venstre	3,389	6.03	-3.56
Left Socialists	2,102	3.74	+3.22
Justice Party of Denmark	810	1.44	-1.22
Christian People's Party	489	0.87	-0.26
Communist Party of Denmark	461	0.82	-0.53
Communist Workers Party	61	0.11	-0.32
Socialist Workers Party	16	0.03	New
Mogens Nebelong	4	0.01	New
Total	56,236		

=== General elections in the 1970s ===
1979 Danish general election

Parties	Vote		
Parties	Votes	%	+ / -
Social Democrats	15,886	28.84	-0.92
Conservatives	14,406	26.15	+7.74
Progress Party	5,490	9.97	-4.63
Social Liberals	5,300	9.62	+4.80
Venstre	5,283	9.59	+2.65
Green Left	3,087	5.60	+1.17
Centre Democrats	2,278	4.14	-4.53
Justice Party of Denmark	1,465	2.66	-0.84
Communist Party of Denmark	741	1.35	-0.95
Christian People's Party	622	1.13	-0.59
Left Socialists	289	0.52	-3.68
Communist Workers Party	239	0.43	New
Total	55,086		

1977 Danish general election

Parties	Vote		
Parties	Votes	%	+ / -
Social Democrats	17,003	29.76	+8.73
Conservatives	10,522	18.41	+7.60
Progress Party	8,343	14.60	-0.55
Centre Democrats	4,953	8.67	+6.11
Venstre	3,967	6.94	-18.38
Social Liberals	2,756	4.82	-3.09
Green Left	2,532	4.43	-1.36
Left Socialists	2,397	4.20	+0.69
Justice Party of Denmark	2,001	3.50	+1.75
Communist Party of Denmark	1,315	2.30	-0.64
Christian People's Party	985	1.72	-1.49
Pensioners' Party	361	0.63	New
Poul Rasmussen	3	0.01	New
Otto Jensen	1	0.00	New
Total	57,139		

1975 Danish general election

Parties	Vote		
Parties	Votes	%	+ / -
Venstre	14,446	25.32	+12.40
Social Democrats	11,997	21.03	+3.16
Progress Party	8,645	15.15	-3.02
Conservatives	6,169	10.81	-4.33
Social Liberals	4,516	7.91	-2.95
Green Left	3,306	5.79	-1.31
Left Socialists	2,005	3.51	+1.05
Christian People's Party	1,830	3.21	+1.03
Communist Party of Denmark	1,679	2.94	-0.23
Centre Democrats	1,461	2.56	-4.76
Justice Party of Denmark	1,001	1.75	-1.06
J. G. Amdrejcak	2	0.00	New
Kai Clemmensen	2	0.00	New
Henning Glahn	1	0.00	New
Poul Friborg	0	0.00	New
Total	57,060		

1973 Danish general election

Parties	Vote		
Parties	Votes	%	+ / -
Progress Party	10,606	18.17	New
Social Democrats	10,430	17.87	-7.19
Conservatives	8,839	15.14	-18.66
Venstre	7,540	12.92	+3.32
Social Liberals	6,338	10.86	-4.81
Centre Democrats	4,272	7.32	New
Green Left	4,143	7.10	-2.31
Communist Party of Denmark	1,852	3.17	+1.99
Justice Party of Denmark	1,641	2.81	+1.18
Left Socialists	1,437	2.46	-0.12
Christian People's Party	1,272	2.18	+1.43
Erik Dissing	5	0.01	New
Total	58,375		

1971 Danish general election

Parties	Vote		
Parties	Votes	%	+ / -
Conservatives	19,065	33.80	-8.33
Social Democrats	14,137	25.06	+1.57
Social Liberals	8,841	15.67	-0.91
Venstre	5,414	9.60	+3.34
Green Left	5,311	9.41	+4.77
Left Socialists	1,457	2.58	+0.21
Justice Party of Denmark	920	1.63	+1.17
Communist Party of Denmark	667	1.18	+0.39
Christian People's Party	425	0.75	New
Henning Berthelsen	174	0.31	New
Total	56,411		

=== General elections in the 1960s ===
1968 Danish general election

Parties	Vote		
Parties	Votes	%	+ / -
Conservatives	23,347	42.13	+3.57
Social Democrats	13,019	23.49	-3.25
Social Liberals	9,187	16.58	+8.43
Venstre	3,471	6.26	-2.42
Green Left	2,570	4.64	-4.75
Liberal Centre	1,577	2.85	-2.58
Left Socialists	1,311	2.37	New
Communist Party of Denmark	440	0.79	+0.18
Justice Party of Denmark	254	0.46	+0.01
Independent Party	240	0.43	-1.55
H. Søndersted Andersen	0	0.00	New
Kirsten Lonning	0	0.00	New
Thode Karlsen	0	0.00	0.00
Total	55,416		

1966 Danish general election

Parties	Vote		
Parties	Votes	%	+ / -
Conservatives	21,079	38.56	-3.68
Social Democrats	14,617	26.74	-4.24
Green Left	5,131	9.39	+4.37
Venstre	4,744	8.68	-2.20
Social Liberals	4,455	8.15	+3.40
Liberal Centre	2,967	5.43	New
Independent Party	1,085	1.98	-1.47
Communist Party of Denmark	334	0.61	-0.29
Justice Party of Denmark	247	0.45	-0.48
Thode Karlsen	1	0.00	New
Total	54,660		

1964 Danish general election

Parties	Vote		
Parties	Votes	%	+ / -
Conservatives	22,264	42.24	+3.86
Social Democrats	16,330	30.98	-2.00
Venstre	5,737	10.88	+1.13
Green Left	2,644	5.02	-0.39
Social Liberals	2,506	4.75	-0.31
Independent Party	1,818	3.45	-2.28
Justice Party of Denmark	488	0.93	-0.90
Communist Party of Denmark	475	0.90	+0.03
Danish Unity	251	0.48	New
Peace Politics People's Party	175	0.33	New
Elin Høgsbro Appel	24	0.05	New
Total	52,712		

1960 Danish general election

Parties	Vote		
Parties	Votes	%	+ / -
Conservatives	18,545	38.38	+1.14
Social Democrats	15,936	32.98	+0.65
Venstre	4,712	9.75	-4.16
Independent Party	2,770	5.73	+3.64
Green Left	2,612	5.41	New
Social Liberals	2,447	5.06	-1.25
Justice Party of Denmark	883	1.83	-3.88
Communist Party of Denmark	420	0.87	-1.53
Total	48,325		

=== General elections in the 1950s ===
1957 Danish general election

Parties	Vote		
Parties	Votes	%	+ / -
Conservatives	16,191	37.24	-0.28
Social Democrats	14,054	32.33	-3.11
Venstre	6,049	13.91	+3.81
Social Liberals	2,744	6.31	+0.02
Justice Party of Denmark	2,484	5.71	+2.21
Communist Party of Denmark	1,043	2.40	-1.69
Independent Party	907	2.09	-0.96
Total	43,472		

September 1953 Danish Folketing election

Parties	Vote		
Parties	Votes	%	+ / -
Conservatives	13,471	37.52	-0.39
Social Democrats	12,724	35.44	-0.27
Venstre	3,627	10.10	+2.23
Social Liberals	2,260	6.29	-0.84
Communist Party of Denmark	1,470	4.09	-0.36
Justice Party of Denmark	1,255	3.50	-2.02
Independent Party	1,095	3.05	New
Total	35,902		

April 1953 Danish Folketing election

Parties	Vote		
Parties	Votes	%	+ / -
Conservatives	12,815	37.91	-0.05
Social Democrats	12,072	35.71	-2.03
Venstre	2,661	7.87	+4.05
Social Liberals	2,411	7.13	+0.56
Justice Party of Denmark	1,865	5.52	-3.45
Communist Party of Denmark	1,504	4.45	-0.48
Danish Unity	474	1.40	New
Total	33,802		

1950 Danish Folketing election

Parties	Vote		
Parties	Votes	%	+ / -
Conservatives	8,312	37.96	+19.80
Social Democrats	8,263	37.74	-6.52
Justice Party of Denmark	1,964	8.97	+3.67
Social Liberals	1,439	6.57	+1.33
Communist Party of Denmark	1,080	4.93	-5.23
Venstre	836	3.82	+3.82
Total	21,894		

=== General elections in the 1940s ===
1947 Danish Folketing election

Parties	Vote		
Parties	Votes	%	+ / -
Social Democrats	23,969	44.26	+9.62
Conservatives	9,836	18.16	-11.22
Venstre	8,175	15.10	+8.91
Communist Party of Denmark	5,505	10.16	-8.46
Justice Party of Denmark	2,868	5.30	+3.39
Social Liberals	2,840	5.24	+0.45
Danish Unity	964	1.78	-2.67
Total	54,157		

1945 Danish Folketing election

Parties	Vote		
Parties	Votes	%	+ / -
Social Democrats	17,392	34.64	-17.65
Conservatives	14,753	29.38	-3.50
Communist Party of Denmark	9,349	18.62	New
Venstre	3,110	6.19	+4.55
Social Liberals	2,404	4.79	-0.89
Danish Unity	2,233	4.45	+1.33
Justice Party of Denmark	960	1.91	+0.50
Edward Hjalmar Larsen	7	0.01	New
Total	50,208		

1943 Danish Folketing election

Parties	Vote		
Parties	Votes	%	+ / -
Social Democrats	24,036	52.29	-1.05
Conservatives	15,114	32.88	+4.02
Social Liberals	2,609	5.68	-2.04
Danish Unity	1,435	3.12	+2.51
National Socialist Workers' Party of Denmark	1,364	2.97	+1.36
Venstre	755	1.64	-0.02
Justice Party of Denmark	650	1.41	-0.07
Chr. Orla Nielsen	7	0.02	New
Total	45,970		

=== General elections in the 1930s ===
1939 Danish Folketing election

Parties	Vote		
Parties	Votes	%	+ / -
Social Democrats	18,665	53.34	-7.50
Conservatives	10,100	28.86	+2.18
Social Liberals	2,703	7.72	+1.31
Communist Party of Denmark	1,088	3.11	+1.25
Venstre	580	1.66	+0.37
National Socialist Workers' Party of Denmark	562	1.61	+0.87
Justice Party of Denmark	518	1.48	-0.50
National Cooperation	514	1.47	New
Danish Unity	212	0.61	New
Farmers' Party	53	0.15	-0.06
Total	34,995		

1935 Danish Folketing election

Parties	Vote		
Parties	Votes	%	+ / -
Social Democrats	17,630	60.84	+2.16
Conservatives	7,731	26.68	-1.48
Social Liberals	1,857	6.41	+0.81
Justice Party of Denmark	574	1.98	-0.33
Communist Party of Denmark	540	1.86	+0.44
Venstre	373	1.29	-2.31
National Socialist Workers' Party of Denmark	215	0.74	New
Independent People's Party	60	0.21	New
Total	28,980		

1932 Danish Folketing election

Parties	Vote		
Parties	Votes	%	+ / -
Social Democrats	14,160	58.68	+1.13
Conservatives	6,796	28.16	+0.40
Social Liberals	1,352	5.60	-0.34
Venstre	868	3.60	-2.62
Justice Party of Denmark	557	2.31	+0.17
Communist Party of Denmark	343	1.42	+1.04
W. Colding	32	0.13	New
Christian Sørensen	23	0.10	New
Total	24,131		

=== General elections in the 1920s ===
1929 Danish Folketing election

Parties	Vote		
Parties	Votes	%	+ / -
Social Democrats	11,966	57.55	+5.10
Conservatives	5,772	27.76	-8.62
Venstre	1,294	6.22	+2.51
Social Liberals	1,234	5.94	+0.05
Justice Party of Denmark	445	2.14	+1.12
Communist Party of Denmark	80	0.38	-0.17
Total	20,791		

1926 Danish Folketing election

Parties	Vote		
Parties	Votes	%	+ / -
Social Democrats	9,702	52.45	-0.55
Conservatives	6,729	36.38	+3.11
Social Liberals	1,089	5.89	+0.06
Venstre	686	3.71	-1.87
Justice Party of Denmark	189	1.02	-0.13
Communist Party of Denmark	102	0.55	-0.43
Total	18,497		

1924 Danish Folketing election

Parties	Vote		
Parties	Votes	%	+ / -
Social Democrats	8,609	53.00	+4.05
Conservatives	5,404	33.27	+4.93
Social Liberals	947	5.83	+1.40
Venstre	907	5.58	-2.18
Justice Party of Denmark	187	1.15	New
Communist Party of Denmark	160	0.98	New
Farmer Party	30	0.18	New
Total	16,244		

September 1920 Danish Folketing election

Parties	Vote		
Parties	Votes	%	+ / -
Social Democrats	6,722	48.95	+4.14
Conservatives	3,892	28.34	-3.53
Industry Party	1,418	10.33	-1.84
Venstre	1,065	7.76	+0.44
Social Liberals	609	4.43	+0.75
Danish Left Socialist Party	27	0.20	New
Total	13,733		

July 1920 Danish Folketing election

Parties	Vote		
Parties	Votes	%	+ / -
Social Democrats	4,975	44.81	+0.60
Conservatives	3,539	31.87	+0.93
Industry Party	1,351	12.17	-1.44
Venstre	813	7.32	+0.83
Social Liberals	409	3.68	-0.12
A. Sterregaard	16	0.14	New
Total	11,103		

April 1920 Danish Folketing election

Parties	Vote	
Parties	Votes	%
Social Democrats	5,351	44.21
Conservatives	3,745	30.94
Industry Party	1,647	13.61
Venstre	786	6.49
Social Liberals	460	3.80
Centrum	90	0.74
Daniel Nielsen	24	0.20
Total	12,103	

== European Parliament elections results ==
2024 European Parliament election in Denmark

Parties	Vote		
Parties	Votes	%	+ / -
Green Left	5,387	19.76	+4.06
Venstre	3,766	13.82	-7.15
Conservatives	3,648	13.38	+1.19
Social Liberals	3,360	12.33	-4.8
Social Democrats	3,107	11.40	-3.47
Liberal Alliance	2,372	8.70	+5.79
Moderates	2,095	7.69	New
Red–Green Alliance	1,399	5.13	+1.01
Danish People's Party	1,056	3.87	-2.33
The Alternative	688	2.52	-0.79
Denmark Democrats	379	1.39	New
Total	27,257		

2019 European Parliament election in Denmark

Parties	Vote		
Parties	Votes	%	+ / -
Venstre	6,123	20.97	+5.10
Social Liberals	5,004	17.13	+4.78
Green Left	4,585	15.70	+3.35
Social Democrats	4,342	14.87	-1.33
Conservatives	3,559	12.19	-1.31
Danish People's Party	1,812	6.20	-12.11
Red–Green Alliance	1,202	4.12	New
The Alternative	968	3.31	New
Liberal Alliance	851	2.91	-1.93
People's Movement against the EU	759	2.60	-3.98
Total	29,205		

2014 European Parliament election in Denmark

Parties	Vote		
Parties	Votes	%	+ / -
Danish People's Party	4,581	18.31	+6.37
Social Democrats	4,053	16.20	-0.89
Venstre	3,972	15.87	-4.38
Conservatives	3,377	13.50	-2.16
Social Liberals	3,091	12.35	+4.35
Green Left	3,090	12.35	-4.47
People's Movement against the EU	1,646	6.58	-0.26
Liberal Alliance	1,212	4.84	+3.82
Total	25,022		

2009 European Parliament election in Denmark

Parties	Vote		
Parties	Votes	%	+ / -
Venstre	5,159	20.25	-0.58
Social Democrats	4,353	17.09	-4.65
Green Left	4,284	16.82	+9.00
Conservatives	3,988	15.66	-6.98
Danish People's Party	3,041	11.94	+6.50
Social Liberals	2,037	8.00	-1.88
People's Movement against the EU	1,741	6.84	+2.63
June Movement	608	2.39	-4.48
Liberal Alliance	260	1.02	New
Total	25,471		

2004 European Parliament election in Denmark

Parties	Vote		
Parties	Votes	%	+ / -
Conservatives	8,296	22.64	+7.60
Social Democrats	7,966	21.74	+12.04
Venstre	7,631	20.83	-8.43
Social Liberals	3,621	9.88	-2.03
Green Left	2,866	7.82	+1.76
June Movement	2,517	6.87	-5.02
Danish People's Party	1,992	5.44	+0.63
People's Movement against the EU	1,543	4.21	-1.83
Christian Democrats	206	0.56	-0.63
Total	36,638		

1999 European Parliament election in Denmark

Parties	Vote		
Parties	Votes	%	+ / -
Venstre	11,251	29.26	+11.81
Conservatives	5,781	15.04	-17.21
Social Liberals	4,580	11.91	+1.61
June Movement	4,570	11.89	-0.08
Social Democrats	3,728	9.70	+0.99
Green Left	2,329	6.06	-1.74
People's Movement against the EU	2,322	6.04	-2.09
Danish People's Party	1,849	4.81	New
Centre Democrats	1,581	4.11	+2.96
Christian Democrats	459	1.19	+0.73
Progress Party	103	0.27	-1.50
Total	38,450		

1994 European Parliament election in Denmark

Parties	Vote		
Parties	Votes	%	+ / -
Conservatives	13,230	32.25	+7.69
Venstre	7,158	17.45	+0.95
June Movement	4,911	11.97	New
Social Liberals	4,226	10.30	+6.28
Social Democrats	3,575	8.71	-5.37
People's Movement against the EU	3,336	8.13	-8.33
Green Left	3,202	7.80	+0.39
Progress Party	728	1.77	-1.52
Centre Democrats	473	1.15	-11.03
Christian Democrats	190	0.46	-1.04
Total	41,029		

1989 European Parliament election in Denmark

Parties	Vote		
Parties	Votes	%	+ / -
Conservatives	8,995	24.56	-11.78
Venstre	6,044	16.50	+10.84
People's Movement against the EU	6,027	16.46	-3.31
Social Democrats	5,158	14.08	+1.72
Centre Democrats	4,462	12.18	+3.75
Green Left	2,713	7.41	-0.11
Social Liberals	1,471	4.02	+0.12
Progress Party	1,206	3.29	-0.08
Christian Democrats	549	1.50	-0.02
Total	36,625		

1984 European Parliament election in Denmark

Parties	Vote	
Parties	Votes	%
Conservatives	14,354	36.34
People's Movement against the EU	7,807	19.77
Social Democrats	4,882	12.36
Centre Democrats	3,329	8.43
Green Left	2,969	7.52
Venstre	2,236	5.66
Social Liberals	1,540	3.90
Progress Party	1,333	3.37
Christian Democrats	601	1.52
Left Socialists	448	1.13
Total	39,499	

== Referendums ==
2022 Danish European Union opt-out referendum

Option	Votes	%
✓ YES	22,099	77.60
X NO	6,378	22.40

2015 Danish European Union opt-out referendum

Option	Votes	%
✓ YES	17,511	60.82
X NO	11,279	39.18

2014 Danish Unified Patent Court membership referendum

Option	Votes	%
✓ YES	17,051	70.24
X NO	7,223	29.76

2009 Danish Act of Succession referendum

Option	Votes	%
✓ YES	19,277	85.63
X NO	3,235	14.37

2000 Danish euro referendum

Option	Votes	%
✓ YES	34,281	61.49
X NO	21,469	38.51

1998 Danish Amsterdam Treaty referendum

Option	Votes	%
✓ YES	34,814	68.13
X NO	16,286	31.87

1993 Danish Maastricht Treaty referendum

Option	Votes	%
✓ YES	38,329	67.38
X NO	18,557	32.62

1992 Danish Maastricht Treaty referendum

Option	Votes	%
✓ YES	34,723	62.02
X NO	21,260	37.98

1986 Danish Single European Act referendum

Option	Votes	%
✓ YES	34,036	65.24
X NO	18,134	34.76

1972 Danish European Communities membership referendum

Option	Votes	%
✓ YES	25,733	64.39
X NO	14,232	35.61

1953 Danish constitutional and electoral age referendum

Option	Votes	%
✓ YES	17,226	68.32
X NO	7,987	31.68
23 years	14,555	57.42
21 years	10,793	42.58

1939 Danish constitutional referendum

Option	Votes	%
✓ YES	26,334	93.36
X NO	1,873	6.64
