= Kalundborg (nomination district) =

- Kalundborg
- Nomination district constituency for the Folketing
- Location of Kalundborg within Zealand

- Location of Zealand within Denmark
- Municipalities: Kalundborg; Odsherred
- Constituency: Zealand
- Electorate: 63,921 (2022)

Current constituency
- Created: 1849 (as constituency); 1920 (as nomination district)

Kalundborg nominating district is one of the 92 nominating districts that exists for Danish elections following the 2007 municipal reform. It consists of Kalundborg and Odsherred municipality. It was created in 1849 as a constituency, and has been a nomination district since 1920, though its boundaries have been changed since then. Prior to 1970 it was known as Kalundborg-Onsbjerg.

In general elections, the district tends to vote a bit more for parties commonly associated with the blue bloc.

== General elections results ==
=== General elections in the 2020s ===
2022 Danish general election

Parties	Vote		
Parties	Votes	%	+ / -
Social Democrats	16,459	32.07	+2.94
Venstre	6,368	12.41	-12.05
Denmark Democrats	5,383	10.49	New
Moderates	4,951	9.65	New
Green Left	4,187	8.16	+1.27
New Right	3,185	6.21	+3.33
Danish People's Party	2,607	5.08	-8.29
Liberal Alliance	2,573	5.01	+3.79
Red–Green Alliance	1,764	3.44	-2.37
Conservatives	1,591	3.10	-1.30
The Alternative	1,009	1.97	+0.08
Social Liberals	867	1.69	-2.77
Independent Greens	139	0.27	New
Christian Democrats	111	0.22	-0.54
Lisa Sofia Larsson	97	0.19	New
Rasmus Paludan	38	0.07	New
Total	51,329		

=== General elections in the 2010s ===
2019 Danish general election

Parties	Vote		
Parties	Votes	%	+ / -
Social Democrats	15,072	29.13	+1.70
Venstre	12,653	24.46	+4.94
Danish People's Party	6,915	13.37	-16.15
Green Left	3,566	6.89	+3.69
Red–Green Alliance	3,006	5.81	-1.23
Social Liberals	2,306	4.46	+1.98
Conservatives	2,276	4.40	+2.15
Stram Kurs	1,827	3.53	New
New Right	1,489	2.88	New
The Alternative	980	1.89	-1.73
Liberal Alliance	630	1.22	-3.41
Klaus Riskær Pedersen Party	597	1.15	New
Christian Democrats	394	0.76	+0.49
Pinki Karin Yvonne Jensen	21	0.04	New
Total	51,732		

2015 Danish general election

Parties	Vote		
Parties	Votes	%	+ / -
Danish People's Party	15,623	29.52	+10.08
Social Democrats	14,514	27.43	+2.44
Venstre	10,333	19.52	-6.98
Red–Green Alliance	3,728	7.04	+1.13
Liberal Alliance	2,449	4.63	+1.31
The Alternative	1,916	3.62	New
Green Left	1,691	3.20	-6.48
Social Liberals	1,312	2.48	-3.94
Conservatives	1,191	2.25	-1.07
Christian Democrats	145	0.27	-0.11
Aamer Ahmad	11	0.02	New
Michael Christiansen	5	0.01	New
Bent A. Jespersen	4	0.01	0.00
Total	52,922		

2011 Danish general election

Parties	Vote		
Parties	Votes	%	+ / -
Venstre	14,257	26.50	-1.37
Social Democrats	13,443	24.99	+0.42
Danish People's Party	10,456	19.44	-0.77
Green Left	5,207	9.68	-2.84
Social Liberals	3,454	6.42	+2.43
Red–Green Alliance	3,181	5.91	+4.41
Conservatives	1,786	3.32	-3.26
Liberal Alliance	1,784	3.32	+0.89
Christian Democrats	205	0.38	+0.05
Peter Lotinga	11	0.02	New
Johan Isbrandt Haulik	10	0.02	New
Bent A. Jespersen	4	0.01	New
Total	53,798		

=== General elections in the 2000s ===
2007 Danish general election

Parties	Vote		
Parties	Votes	%	+ / -
Venstre	14,921	27.87	-4.81
Social Democrats	13,155	24.57	-2.81
Danish People's Party	10,823	20.21	+3.77
Green Left	6,704	12.52	+6.47
Conservatives	3,525	6.58	-0.37
Social Liberals	2,134	3.99	-2.44
New Alliance	1,302	2.43	New
Red–Green Alliance	804	1.50	-0.53
Christian Democrats	176	0.33	-0.54
Total	53,544		

2005 Danish general election

Parties	Vote		
Parties	Votes	%	+ / -
Venstre	8,347	32.68	+2.17
Social Democrats	6,993	27.38	-2.31
Danish People's Party	4,199	16.44	+1.49
Conservatives	1,775	6.95	-2.71
Social Liberals	1,642	6.43	+2.70
Green Left	1,546	6.05	-0.54
Red–Green Alliance	519	2.03	+0.71
Centre Democrats	231	0.90	-0.32
Christian Democrats	223	0.87	-0.58
Minority Party	56	0.22	New
Bent A. Jespersen	8	0.03	New
Total	25,539		

2001 Danish general election

Parties	Vote		
Parties	Votes	%	+ / -
Venstre	7,907	30.51	+7.11
Social Democrats	7,694	29.69	-7.67
Danish People's Party	3,876	14.95	+5.52
Conservatives	2,504	9.66	+1.08
Green Left	1,709	6.59	-1.68
Social Liberals	967	3.73	+0.47
Christian People's Party	376	1.45	-0.44
Red–Green Alliance	343	1.32	-0.27
Centre Democrats	317	1.22	-3.26
Progress Party	160	0.62	-0.85
Mark Hulstrøm	65	0.25	New
Total	25,918		

=== General elections in the 1990s ===
1998 Danish general election

Parties	Vote		
Parties	Votes	%	+ / -
Social Democrats	9,488	37.36	+0.42
Venstre	5,942	23.40	+0.25
Danish People's Party	2,396	9.43	New
Conservatives	2,179	8.58	-5.25
Green Left	2,099	8.27	-0.92
Centre Democrats	1,138	4.48	+1.89
Social Liberals	827	3.26	-1.40
Christian People's Party	481	1.89	+0.75
Red–Green Alliance	404	1.59	-0.56
Progress Party	374	1.47	-4.82
Democratic Renewal	63	0.25	New
Bent A. Jespersen	5	0.02	New
Total	25,396		

1994 Danish general election

Parties	Vote		
Parties	Votes	%	+ / -
Social Democrats	9,107	36.94	-2.75
Venstre	5,707	23.15	+7.70
Conservatives	3,410	13.83	-0.80
Green Left	2,265	9.19	-0.93
Progress Party	1,551	6.29	+0.10
Social Liberals	1,148	4.66	+1.13
Centre Democrats	638	2.59	-2.45
Red–Green Alliance	531	2.15	+1.35
Christian People's Party	281	1.14	-0.15
Henning Moth	11	0.04	New
Grethe Lindberg	4	0.02	New
Total	24,653		

1990 Danish general election

Parties	Vote		
Parties	Votes	%	+ / -
Social Democrats	9,623	39.69	+8.02
Venstre	3,746	15.45	+2.73
Conservatives	3,547	14.63	-2.24
Green Left	2,453	10.12	-3.13
Progress Party	1,500	6.19	-3.83
Centre Democrats	1,223	5.04	+0.76
Social Liberals	856	3.53	-2.10
Common Course	487	2.01	-0.43
Christian People's Party	313	1.29	+0.19
Red–Green Alliance	195	0.80	New
The Greens	180	0.74	-0.54
Justice Party of Denmark	117	0.48	New
Humanist Party	6	0.02	New
Total	24,246		

=== General elections in the 1980s ===
1988 Danish general election

Parties	Vote		
Parties	Votes	%	+ / -
Social Democrats	7,917	31.67	+0.08
Conservatives	4,218	16.87	-1.85
Green Left	3,313	13.25	-1.26
Venstre	3,180	12.72	+0.82
Progress Party	2,506	10.02	+4.71
Social Liberals	1,407	5.63	-0.82
Centre Democrats	1,069	4.28	+0.22
Common Course	611	2.44	-0.38
The Greens	320	1.28	-0.06
Christian People's Party	275	1.10	-0.18
Communist Party of Denmark	113	0.45	-0.15
Left Socialists	67	0.27	-0.31
Søren Barder	5	0.02	New
Total	25,001		

1987 Danish general election

Parties	Vote		
Parties	Votes	%	+ / -
Social Democrats	7,934	31.59	-1.60
Conservatives	4,702	18.72	-4.64
Green Left	3,643	14.51	+3.82
Venstre	2,988	11.90	-1.62
Social Liberals	1,620	6.45	+0.44
Progress Party	1,333	5.31	+1.76
Centre Democrats	1,020	4.06	-0.65
Common Course	707	2.82	New
The Greens	337	1.34	New
Christian People's Party	322	1.28	-0.47
Communist Party of Denmark	150	0.60	+0.17
Left Socialists	146	0.58	-0.63
Justice Party of Denmark	127	0.51	-0.96
Humanist Party	52	0.21	New
Socialist Workers Party	25	0.10	+0.02
Marxist–Leninists Party	6	0.02	+0.02
Total	25,112		

1984 Danish general election

Parties	Vote		
Parties	Votes	%	+ / -
Social Democrats	8,314	33.19	-0.58
Conservatives	5,852	23.36	+10.94
Venstre	3,386	13.52	-1.40
Green Left	2,678	10.69	+1.56
Social Liberals	1,506	6.01	+0.09
Centre Democrats	1,179	4.71	-4.66
Progress Party	890	3.55	-5.99
Christian People's Party	439	1.75	+0.32
Justice Party of Denmark	369	1.47	+0.17
Left Socialists	303	1.21	0.00
Communist Party of Denmark	108	0.43	-0.29
Socialist Workers Party	19	0.08	0.00
Bent E. Jespersen	9	0.04	New
Marxist–Leninists Party	1	0.00	New
Total	25,053		

1981 Danish general election

Parties	Vote		
Parties	Votes	%	+ / -
Social Democrats	7,772	33.77	-5.67
Venstre	3,433	14.92	-1.11
Conservatives	2,859	12.42	+1.53
Progress Party	2,196	9.54	-2.38
Centre Democrats	2,157	9.37	+5.97
Green Left	2,101	9.13	+4.27
Social Liberals	1,363	5.92	-0.23
Christian People's Party	330	1.43	-0.15
Justice Party of Denmark	300	1.30	-0.95
Left Socialists	278	1.21	-0.80
Communist Party of Denmark	166	0.72	-0.45
Communist Workers Party	36	0.16	-0.14
Socialist Workers Party	18	0.08	New
Kai Linde	8	0.03	New
Total	23,017		

=== General elections in the 1970s ===
1979 Danish general election

Parties	Vote		
Parties	Votes	%	+ / -
Social Democrats	9,199	39.44	+2.55
Venstre	3,738	16.03	+1.23
Progress Party	2,780	11.92	-4.74
Conservatives	2,540	10.89	+3.83
Social Liberals	1,435	6.15	+1.44
Green Left	1,133	4.86	+2.01
Centre Democrats	792	3.40	-3.05
Justice Party of Denmark	525	2.25	-0.72
Left Socialists	469	2.01	+0.63
Christian People's Party	368	1.58	-1.15
Communist Party of Denmark	273	1.17	-1.48
Communist Workers Party	71	0.30	New
Total	23,323		

1977 Danish general election

Parties	Vote		
Parties	Votes	%	+ / -
Social Democrats	8,425	36.89	+6.93
Progress Party	3,804	16.66	+1.74
Venstre	3,381	14.80	-12.01
Conservatives	1,613	7.06	+2.65
Centre Democrats	1,473	6.45	+4.48
Social Liberals	1,076	4.71	-3.42
Justice Party of Denmark	678	2.97	+1.33
Green Left	651	2.85	-0.92
Christian People's Party	624	2.73	-1.75
Communist Party of Denmark	605	2.65	-0.25
Left Socialists	315	1.38	+0.38
Pensioners' Party	193	0.85	New
Total	22,838		

1975 Danish general election

Parties	Vote		
Parties	Votes	%	+ / -
Social Democrats	6,725	29.96	+4.27
Venstre	6,018	26.81	+11.11
Progress Party	3,349	14.92	-2.85
Social Liberals	1,824	8.13	-4.15
Christian People's Party	1,005	4.48	+1.59
Conservatives	990	4.41	-2.69
Green Left	846	3.77	-0.64
Communist Party of Denmark	652	2.90	+0.91
Centre Democrats	442	1.97	-6.88
Justice Party of Denmark	368	1.64	-0.93
Left Socialists	225	1.00	+0.27
N. Vestergård Eriksen	2	0.01	New
Egon Larsen	1	0.00	New
Total	22,447		

1973 Danish general election

Parties	Vote		
Parties	Votes	%	+ / -
Social Democrats	5,745	25.69	-12.91
Progress Party	3,975	17.77	New
Venstre	3,512	15.70	-6.34
Social Liberals	2,746	12.28	-3.24
Centre Democrats	1,980	8.85	New
Conservatives	1,589	7.10	-4.33
Green Left	986	4.41	-3.09
Christian People's Party	647	2.89	+1.56
Justice Party of Denmark	575	2.57	+0.61
Communist Party of Denmark	446	1.99	+1.14
Left Socialists	164	0.73	-0.04
Total	22,365		

1971 Danish general election

Parties	Vote		
Parties	Votes	%	+ / -
Social Democrats	8,151	38.60	+2.98
Venstre	4,655	22.04	-1.37
Social Liberals	3,278	15.52	-1.03
Conservatives	2,413	11.43	-4.71
Green Left	1,583	7.50	+2.63
Justice Party of Denmark	414	1.96	+1.26
Christian People's Party	280	1.33	New
Communist Party of Denmark	179	0.85	+0.43
Left Socialists	163	0.77	-0.40
Total	21,116		

=== General elections in the 1960s ===
1968 Danish general election

Parties	Vote		
Parties	Votes	%	+ / -
Social Democrats	6,635	35.62	-4.85
Venstre	4,360	23.41	-2.98
Social Liberals	3,083	16.55	+6.38
Conservatives	3,006	16.14	+4.98
Green Left	907	4.87	-2.77
Left Socialists	218	1.17	New
Liberal Centre	159	0.85	-0.91
Justice Party of Denmark	130	0.70	-0.09
Communist Party of Denmark	78	0.42	-0.06
Independent Party	50	0.27	-0.88
Total	18,626		

1966 Danish general election

Parties	Vote		
Parties	Votes	%	+ / -
Social Democrats	7,390	40.47	-1.85
Venstre	4,818	26.39	-0.57
Conservatives	2,037	11.16	-1.35
Social Liberals	1,857	10.17	+0.57
Green Left	1,395	7.64	+3.88
Liberal Centre	321	1.76	New
Independent Party	210	1.15	-0.66
Justice Party of Denmark	144	0.79	-1.07
Communist Party of Denmark	87	0.48	-0.04
Total	18,259		

1964 Danish general election

Parties	Vote		
Parties	Votes	%	+ / -
Social Democrats	7,368	42.32	+2.13
Venstre	4,695	26.96	-0.85
Conservatives	2,179	12.51	+1.17
Social Liberals	1,672	9.60	-1.48
Green Left	655	3.76	-0.69
Justice Party of Denmark	323	1.86	-0.66
Independent Party	316	1.81	-0.17
Communist Party of Denmark	91	0.52	-0.10
Peace Politics People's Party	80	0.46	New
Danish Unity	33	0.19	New
Total	17,412		

1960 Danish general election

Parties	Vote		
Parties	Votes	%	+ / -
Social Democrats	6,690	40.19	+4.02
Venstre	4,628	27.81	-4.72
Conservatives	1,888	11.34	+1.88
Social Liberals	1,844	11.08	-2.84
Green Left	740	4.45	New
Justice Party of Denmark	420	2.52	-2.69
Independent Party	330	1.98	+0.89
Communist Party of Denmark	104	0.62	-1.00
Total	16,644		

=== General elections in the 1950s ===
1957 Danish general election

Parties	Vote		
Parties	Votes	%	+ / -
Social Democrats	5,830	36.17	-2.37
Venstre	5,243	32.53	+2.65
Social Liberals	2,244	13.92	-0.35
Conservatives	1,525	9.46	-0.10
Justice Party of Denmark	840	5.21	+1.34
Communist Party of Denmark	261	1.62	-1.00
Independent Party	176	1.09	-0.17
Total	16,119		

September 1953 Danish Folketing election

Parties	Vote		
Parties	Votes	%	+ / -
Social Democrats	5,921	38.54	+1.51
Venstre	4,591	29.88	+0.61
Social Liberals	2,193	14.27	-0.56
Conservatives	1,469	9.56	-0.16
Justice Party of Denmark	594	3.87	-2.06
Communist Party of Denmark	402	2.62	-0.25
Independent Party	193	1.26	New
Total	15,363		

April 1953 Danish Folketing election

Parties	Vote		
Parties	Votes	%	+ / -
Social Democrats	5,492	37.03	+0.55
Venstre	4,341	29.27	+2.74
Social Liberals	2,199	14.83	-0.21
Conservatives	1,441	9.72	+0.28
Justice Party of Denmark	879	5.93	-3.84
Communist Party of Denmark	425	2.87	+0.13
Danish Unity	54	0.36	New
Total	14,831		

1950 Danish Folketing election

Parties	Vote		
Parties	Votes	%	+ / -
Social Democrats	5,391	36.48	+3.69
Venstre	3,920	26.53	-8.37
Social Liberals	2,222	15.04	-2.60
Justice Party of Denmark	1,443	9.77	+5.69
Conservatives	1,395	9.44	+3.23
Communist Party of Denmark	405	2.74	-0.78
Total	14,776		

=== General elections in the 1940s ===
1947 Danish Folketing election

Parties	Vote		
Parties	Votes	%	+ / -
Venstre	21,810	34.90	+9.26
Social Democrats	20,489	32.79	+0.43
Social Liberals	11,023	17.64	-0.37
Conservatives	3,878	6.21	-3.24
Justice Party of Denmark	2,552	4.08	+0.27
Communist Party of Denmark	2,200	3.52	-5.74
Danish Unity	539	0.86	-0.60
Total	62,491		

1945 Danish Folketing election

Parties	Vote		
Parties	Votes	%	+ / -
Social Democrats	4,929	32.36	-8.85
Venstre	3,905	25.64	+3.38
Social Liberals	2,744	18.01	-1.85
Conservatives	1,440	9.45	-1.73
Communist Party of Denmark	1,411	9.26	New
Justice Party of Denmark	581	3.81	+0.67
Danish Unity	222	1.46	+0.62
Total	15,232		

1943 Danish Folketing election

Parties	Vote		
Parties	Votes	%	+ / -
Social Democrats	6,265	41.21	+4.03
Venstre	3,384	22.26	+0.15
Social Liberals	3,019	19.86	-1.53
Conservatives	1,699	11.18	+1.17
Justice Party of Denmark	478	3.14	-1.05
National Socialist Workers' Party of Denmark	178	1.17	-0.84
Danish Unity	127	0.84	+0.77
Farmers' Party	51	0.34	-0.25
Total	15,201		

=== General elections in the 1930s ===
1939 Danish Folketing election

Parties	Vote		
Parties	Votes	%	+ / -
Social Democrats	5,020	37.18	-3.95
Venstre	2,986	22.11	+0.75
Social Liberals	2,888	21.39	+0.44
Conservatives	1,352	10.01	-0.22
Justice Party of Denmark	566	4.19	+0.13
National Socialist Workers' Party of Denmark	271	2.01	+1.45
Communist Party of Denmark	264	1.96	+1.35
Farmers' Party	79	0.59	-0.52
National Cooperation	68	0.50	New
Danish Unity	9	0.07	New
Total	13,503		

1935 Danish Folketing election

Parties	Vote		
Parties	Votes	%	+ / -
Social Democrats	5,423	41.13	+3.57
Venstre	2,816	21.36	-4.23
Social Liberals	2,762	20.95	-1.57
Conservatives	1,349	10.23	-0.21
Justice Party of Denmark	535	4.06	+0.51
Independent People's Party	146	1.11	New
Communist Party of Denmark	80	0.61	+0.26
National Socialist Workers' Party of Denmark	74	0.56	New
Total	13,185		

1932 Danish Folketing election

Parties	Vote		
Parties	Votes	%	+ / -
Social Democrats	4,909	37.56	+1.43
Venstre	3,345	25.59	-1.20
Social Liberals	2,943	22.52	-3.82
Conservatives	1,364	10.44	+2.25
Justice Party of Denmark	464	3.55	+1.11
Communist Party of Denmark	46	0.35	+0.24
Total	13,071		

=== General elections in the 1920s ===
1929 Danish Folketing election

Parties	Vote		
Parties	Votes	%	+ / -
Social Democrats	4,437	36.13	+5.52
Venstre	3,290	26.79	-0.85
Social Liberals	3,234	26.34	-5.77
Conservatives	1,006	8.19	-0.36
Justice Party of Denmark	299	2.44	+1.35
Communist Party of Denmark	13	0.11	New
Total	12,279		

1926 Danish Folketing election

Parties	Vote		
Parties	Votes	%	+ / -
Social Liberals	3,748	32.11	-2.20
Social Democrats	3,573	30.61	+1.03
Venstre	3,226	27.64	+1.41
Conservatives	998	8.55	+0.14
Justice Party of Denmark	127	1.09	-0.15
Total	11,672		

1924 Danish Folketing election

Parties	Vote		
Parties	Votes	%	+ / -
Social Liberals	4,024	34.31	-0.60
Social Democrats	3,469	29.58	+3.30
Venstre	3,077	26.23	-1.04
Conservatives	986	8.41	-2.00
Justice Party of Denmark	146	1.24	New
Farmer Party	21	0.18	New
Communist Party of Denmark	6	0.05	New
Total	11,729		

September 1920 Danish Folketing election

Parties	Vote		
Parties	Votes	%	+ / -
Social Liberals	3,938	34.91	-2.04
Venstre	3,076	27.27	-0.58
Social Democrats	2,964	26.28	+3.40
Conservatives	1,174	10.41	-0.75
Industry Party	128	1.13	-0.04
Total	11,280		

July 1920 Danish Folketing election

Parties	Vote		
Parties	Votes	%	+ / -
Social Liberals	3,512	36.95	-0.91
Venstre	2,647	27.85	+0.35
Social Democrats	2,175	22.88	+0.58
Conservatives	1,061	11.16	+0.21
Industry Party	111	1.17	-0.22
Total	9,506		

April 1920 Danish Folketing election

Parties	Vote	
Parties	Votes	%
Social Liberals	3,727	37.86
Venstre	2,707	27.50
Social Democrats	2,195	22.30
Conservatives	1,078	10.95
Industry Party	137	1.39
Total	9,844	

== European Parliament elections results ==
2024 European Parliament election in Denmark

Parties	Vote		
Parties	Votes	%	+ / -
Social Democrats	5,917	18.28	-5.72
Venstre	4,960	15.33	-7.64
Green Left	4,904	15.15	+4.27
Danish People's Party	3,635	11.23	-5.66
Denmark Democrats	3,561	11.00	New
Conservatives	2,086	6.45	+2.07
Moderates	1,895	5.86	New
Red–Green Alliance	1,779	5.50	+0.17
Liberal Alliance	1,705	5.27	+3.70
Social Liberals	1,327	4.10	-2.53
The Alternative	593	1.83	-0.55
Total	32,362		

2019 European Parliament election in Denmark

Parties	Vote		
Parties	Votes	%	+ / -
Social Democrats	9,162	24.00	+6.15
Venstre	8,768	22.97	+5.81
Danish People's Party	6,448	16.89	-18.26
Green Left	4,152	10.88	+1.85
Social Liberals	2,529	6.63	+2.29
Red–Green Alliance	2,036	5.33	New
People's Movement against the EU	1,895	4.96	-3.83
Conservatives	1,671	4.38	-1.61
The Alternative	909	2.38	New
Liberal Alliance	601	1.57	-0.13
Total	38,171		

2014 European Parliament election in Denmark

Parties	Vote		
Parties	Votes	%	+ / -
Danish People's Party	11,722	35.15	+14.54
Social Democrats	5,952	17.85	-1.95
Venstre	5,722	17.16	-4.61
Green Left	3,010	9.03	-6.36
People's Movement against the EU	2,931	8.79	+1.85
Conservatives	1,996	5.99	-3.64
Social Liberals	1,446	4.34	+1.25
Liberal Alliance	568	1.70	+1.33
Total	33,347		

2009 European Parliament election in Denmark

Parties	Vote		
Parties	Votes	%	+ / -
Venstre	7,488	21.77	-0.11
Danish People's Party	7,090	20.61	+12.48
Social Democrats	6,812	19.80	-14.78
Green Left	5,294	15.39	+8.20
Conservatives	3,314	9.63	+0.53
People's Movement against the EU	2,388	6.94	+2.30
Social Liberals	1,063	3.09	-2.33
June Movement	821	2.39	-5.99
Liberal Alliance	126	0.37	New
Total	34,396		

2004 European Parliament election in Denmark

Parties	Vote		
Parties	Votes	%	+ / -
Social Democrats	4,705	34.58	+14.70
Venstre	2,978	21.88	-1.94
Conservatives	1,239	9.10	+1.83
June Movement	1,141	8.38	-9.25
Danish People's Party	1,107	8.13	+1.97
Green Left	978	7.19	+1.02
Social Liberals	738	5.42	-1.90
People's Movement against the EU	632	4.64	-1.95
Christian Democrats	90	0.66	-0.56
Total	13,608		

1999 European Parliament election in Denmark

Parties	Vote		
Parties	Votes	%	+ / -
Venstre	3,375	23.82	+2.28
Social Democrats	2,817	19.88	+0.78
June Movement	2,498	17.63	+3.03
Social Liberals	1,037	7.32	-1.10
Conservatives	1,030	7.27	-8.48
People's Movement against the EU	934	6.59	-2.23
Green Left	874	6.17	-0.69
Danish People's Party	873	6.16	New
Centre Democrats	557	3.93	+2.75
Christian Democrats	173	1.22	+0.61
Progress Party	94	0.66	-2.46
Total	14,168		

1994 European Parliament election in Denmark

Parties	Vote		
Parties	Votes	%	+ / -
Venstre	3,204	21.54	+1.78
Social Democrats	2,842	19.10	-7.43
Conservatives	2,343	15.75	+5.36
June Movement	2,172	14.60	New
People's Movement against the EU	1,312	8.82	-6.61
Social Liberals	1,253	8.42	+5.44
Green Left	1,021	6.86	-1.80
Progress Party	464	3.12	-2.74
Centre Democrats	175	1.18	-7.60
Christian Democrats	90	0.61	-1.00
Total	14,876		

1989 European Parliament election in Denmark

Parties	Vote		
Parties	Votes	%	+ / -
Social Democrats	3,533	26.53	+5.13
Venstre	2,632	19.76	+1.50
People's Movement against the EU	2,055	15.43	-1.09
Conservatives	1,383	10.39	-8.39
Centre Democrats	1,169	8.78	+1.55
Green Left	1,153	8.66	+0.78
Progress Party	780	5.86	+2.35
Social Liberals	397	2.98	-0.93
Christian Democrats	215	1.61	-0.24
Total	13,317		

1984 European Parliament election in Denmark

Parties	Vote	
Parties	Votes	%
Social Democrats	3,095	21.40
Conservatives	2,717	18.78
Venstre	2,641	18.26
People's Movement against the EU	2,389	16.52
Green Left	1,140	7.88
Centre Democrats	1,046	7.23
Social Liberals	566	3.91
Progress Party	508	3.51
Christian Democrats	267	1.85
Left Socialists	96	0.66
Total	14,465	

== Referendums ==
2022 Danish European Union opt-out referendum

Option	Votes	%
✓ YES	24,685	60.00
X NO	16,460	40.00

2015 Danish European Union opt-out referendum

Option	Votes	%
X NO	27,582	61.32
✓ YES	17,400	38.68

2014 Danish Unified Patent Court membership referendum

Option	Votes	%
✓ YES	19,388	59.14
X NO	13,393	40.86

2009 Danish Act of Succession referendum

Option	Votes	%
✓ YES	27,701	84.54
X NO	5,065	15.46

2000 Danish euro referendum

Option	Votes	%
X NO	15,069	58.14
✓ YES	10,850	41.86

1998 Danish Amsterdam Treaty referendum

Option	Votes	%
✓ YES	11,868	52.61
X NO	10,692	47.39

1993 Danish Maastricht Treaty referendum

Option	Votes	%
✓ YES	14,404	56.27
X NO	11,196	43.73

1992 Danish Maastricht Treaty referendum

Option	Votes	%
X NO	12,195	50.06
✓ YES	12,165	49.94

1986 Danish Single European Act referendum

Option	Votes	%
✓ YES	12,516	57.58
X NO	9,219	42.42

1972 Danish European Communities membership referendum

Option	Votes	%
✓ YES	15,526	69.26
X NO	6,892	30.74

1953 Danish constitutional and electoral age referendum

Option	Votes	%
✓ YES	10,817	89.01
X NO	1,336	10.99
23 years	6,869	55.23
21 years	5,568	44.77

1939 Danish constitutional referendum

Option	Votes	%
✓ YES	8,149	92.22
X NO	687	7.78
