= Fredensborg (nomination district) =

- Fredensborg
- Nomination district constituency for the Folketing
- Location of Fredensborg within North Zealand

- Location of North Zealand within Denmark
- Municipalities: Fredensborg; Hørsholm
- Constituency: North Zealand
- Electorate: 46,686 (2022)

Current constituency
- Created: 1849 (as constituency); 1920 (as nomination district)

Fredensborg nominating district is one of the 92 nominating districts that was created for Danish elections following the 2007 municipal reform. It consists of Fredensborg and Hørsholm municipality. It was created in 1849 as a constituency, and has been a nomination district since 1920, though its boundaries have been changed since then.

In general elections, the district is a strong area for parties commonly associated with the blue bloc.

== General elections results ==
=== General elections in the 2020s ===
2022 Danish general election

Parties	Vote		
Parties	Votes	%	+ / -
Social Democrats	7,588	18.83	+2.48
Venstre	6,913	17.16	-9.06
Moderates	5,124	12.72	New
Liberal Alliance	5,097	12.65	+8.17
Conservatives	4,051	10.05	-5.44
Green Left	2,583	6.41	+0.63
Social Liberals	2,215	5.50	-7.16
Denmark Democrats	1,455	3.61	New
New Right	1,412	3.50	+0.42
Red–Green Alliance	1,301	3.23	-0.98
The Alternative	1,199	2.98	+0.67
Danish People's Party	916	2.27	-4.03
Independent Greens	288	0.71	New
Christian Democrats	116	0.29	-0.65
Jayseth Lotus Arrose Simoysano	23	0.06	New
Katjalivah Elleyhansen	11	0.03	New
Total	40,292		

=== General elections in the 2010s ===
2019 Danish general election

Parties	Vote		
Parties	Votes	%	+ / -
Venstre	10,701	26.22	+3.11
Social Democrats	6,671	16.35	-2.19
Conservatives	6,320	15.49	+7.89
Social Liberals	5,168	12.66	+5.64
Danish People's Party	2,572	6.30	-9.57
Green Left	2,359	5.78	+2.55
Liberal Alliance	1,829	4.48	-10.76
Red–Green Alliance	1,717	4.21	-0.73
New Right	1,255	3.08	New
The Alternative	944	2.31	-1.71
Stram Kurs	490	1.20	New
Christian Democrats	383	0.94	+0.54
Klaus Riskær Pedersen Party	376	0.92	New
Gert Lassen	27	0.07	+0.06
Hans Frederik Brobjerg	1	0.00	New
Total	40,813		

2015 Danish general election

Parties	Vote		
Parties	Votes	%	+ / -
Venstre	9,377	23.11	-11.89
Social Democrats	7,523	18.54	+3.92
Danish People's Party	6,441	15.87	+6.87
Liberal Alliance	6,182	15.24	+6.24
Conservatives	3,083	7.60	-2.71
Social Liberals	2,848	7.02	-5.06
Red–Green Alliance	2,003	4.94	+1.15
The Alternative	1,633	4.02	New
Green Left	1,311	3.23	-2.67
Christian Democrats	161	0.40	+0.13
Aleks Jensen	11	0.03	New
Gert Lassen	4	0.01	New
Total	40,577		

2011 Danish general election

Parties	Vote		
Parties	Votes	%	+ / -
Venstre	14,314	35.00	+3.56
Social Democrats	5,981	14.62	-1.66
Social Liberals	4,942	12.08	+4.46
Conservatives	4,216	10.31	-8.14
Liberal Alliance	3,679	9.00	+3.91
Danish People's Party	3,679	9.00	-1.99
Green Left	2,411	5.90	-2.28
Red–Green Alliance	1,549	3.79	+2.19
Christian Democrats	112	0.27	-0.07
Bjarne Holm	15	0.04	New
Total	40,898		

=== General elections in the 2000s ===
2007 Danish general election

Parties	Vote		
Parties	Votes	%	+ / -
Venstre	12,600	31.44	-3.32
Conservatives	7,396	18.45	+3.47
Social Democrats	6,526	16.28	+0.67
Danish People's Party	4,405	10.99	-1.14
Green Left	3,278	8.18	+3.56
Social Liberals	3,054	7.62	-4.92
New Alliance	2,042	5.09	New
Red–Green Alliance	643	1.60	-1.20
Christian Democrats	137	0.34	-0.98
Total	40,081		

2005 Danish general election

Parties	Vote		
Parties	Votes	%	+ / -
Venstre	22,950	34.76	-3.99
Social Democrats	10,305	15.61	-3.68
Conservatives	9,889	14.98	+3.35
Social Liberals	8,282	12.54	+4.88
Danish People's Party	8,010	12.13	+1.88
Green Left	3,053	4.62	-1.18
Red–Green Alliance	1,851	2.80	+0.86
Christian Democrats	872	1.32	-0.76
Centre Democrats	667	1.01	-1.19
Minority Party	143	0.22	New
Total	66,022		

2001 Danish general election

Parties	Vote		
Parties	Votes	%	+ / -
Venstre	26,567	38.75	+12.42
Social Democrats	13,226	19.29	-5.47
Conservatives	7,972	11.63	-8.30
Danish People's Party	7,027	10.25	+3.43
Social Liberals	5,251	7.66	+3.26
Green Left	3,975	5.80	-1.08
Centre Democrats	1,510	2.20	-2.89
Christian People's Party	1,424	2.08	+0.08
Red–Green Alliance	1,333	1.94	-0.33
Progress Party	273	0.40	-0.83
Total	68,558		

=== General elections in the 1990s ===
1998 Danish general election

Parties	Vote		
Parties	Votes	%	+ / -
Venstre	17,658	26.33	+3.01
Social Democrats	16,602	24.76	+1.57
Conservatives	13,366	19.93	-8.83
Green Left	4,614	6.88	-0.04
Danish People's Party	4,576	6.82	New
Centre Democrats	3,411	5.09	+1.60
Social Liberals	2,948	4.40	-1.13
Red–Green Alliance	1,521	2.27	-0.46
Christian People's Party	1,338	2.00	+0.67
Progress Party	828	1.23	-3.43
Democratic Renewal	168	0.25	New
Sabina Schilliing Nybo Rasmussen	34	0.05	New
Total	67,064		

1994 Danish general election

Parties	Vote		
Parties	Votes	%	+ / -
Conservatives	18,812	28.76	+2.34
Venstre	15,248	23.32	+5.12
Social Democrats	15,163	23.19	-2.37
Green Left	4,527	6.92	-0.28
Social Liberals	3,616	5.53	+1.10
Progress Party	3,047	4.66	+0.05
Centre Democrats	2,281	3.49	-3.70
Red–Green Alliance	1,784	2.73	+0.55
Christian People's Party	869	1.33	-0.28
Jørgen Ruberg	52	0.08	New
Total	65,399		

1990 Danish general election

Parties	Vote		
Parties	Votes	%	+ / -
Conservatives	16,394	26.42	-4.84
Social Democrats	15,861	25.56	+6.28
Venstre	11,294	18.20	+7.40
Green Left	4,465	7.20	-4.21
Centre Democrats	4,461	7.19	+0.38
Progress Party	2,860	4.61	-3.01
Social Liberals	2,747	4.43	-2.67
Red–Green Alliance	1,351	2.18	New
Christian People's Party	998	1.61	+0.23
Common Course	755	1.22	-0.09
The Greens	606	0.98	-0.94
Justice Party of Denmark	244	0.39	New
Humanist Party	19	0.03	New
Total	62,055		

=== General elections in the 1980s ===
1988 Danish general election

Parties	Vote		
Parties	Votes	%	+ / -
Conservatives	19,684	31.26	-2.07
Social Democrats	12,140	19.28	+1.36
Green Left	7,188	11.41	-1.46
Venstre	6,799	10.80	+2.75
Progress Party	4,796	7.62	+3.98
Social Liberals	4,469	7.10	-1.44
Centre Democrats	4,290	6.81	-0.98
The Greens	1,206	1.92	-0.08
Christian People's Party	871	1.38	-0.33
Common Course	827	1.31	-0.19
Communist Party of Denmark	426	0.68	-0.02
Left Socialists	267	0.42	-0.88
Lars Kristensen	10	0.02	0.00
Total	62,973		

1987 Danish general election

Parties	Vote		
Parties	Votes	%	+ / -
Conservatives	21,312	33.33	-1.45
Social Democrats	11,461	17.92	-3.38
Green Left	8,230	12.87	+2.00
Social Liberals	5,462	8.54	+1.05
Venstre	5,148	8.05	-2.97
Centre Democrats	4,984	7.79	+2.99
Progress Party	2,330	3.64	+0.65
The Greens	1,280	2.00	New
Christian People's Party	1,094	1.71	-0.15
Common Course	957	1.50	New
Left Socialists	829	1.30	-1.47
Communist Party of Denmark	446	0.70	+0.08
Justice Party of Denmark	229	0.36	-1.09
Humanist Party	132	0.21	New
Socialist Workers Party	26	0.04	0.00
Lars Kristensen	12	0.02	+0.01
Marxist–Leninists Party	7	0.01	0.00
Total	63,939		

1984 Danish general election

Parties	Vote		
Parties	Votes	%	+ / -
Conservatives	21,222	34.78	+9.00
Social Democrats	12,995	21.30	-1.82
Venstre	6,722	11.02	+2.18
Green Left	6,632	10.87	-0.16
Social Liberals	4,568	7.49	+1.33
Centre Democrats	2,927	4.80	-4.45
Progress Party	1,823	2.99	-6.02
Left Socialists	1,690	2.77	-0.15
Christian People's Party	1,136	1.86	+0.41
Justice Party of Denmark	887	1.45	+0.14
Communist Party of Denmark	381	0.62	-0.33
Socialist Workers Party	24	0.04	-0.01
Marxist–Leninists Party	5	0.01	New
Lars Kristensen	4	0.01	New
Leni Thomsen	3	0.00	New
Lars Bjørnbak Hallstein	1	0.00	New
Total	61,020		

1981 Danish general election

Parties	Vote		
Parties	Votes	%	+ / -
Conservatives	14,306	25.78	+4.45
Social Democrats	12,830	23.12	-5.10
Green Left	6,119	11.03	+5.01
Centre Democrats	5,131	9.25	+5.29
Progress Party	4,999	9.01	-1.94
Venstre	4,906	8.84	-3.72
Social Liberals	3,419	6.16	-0.80
Left Socialists	1,619	2.92	-1.09
Christian People's Party	807	1.45	-0.16
Justice Party of Denmark	727	1.31	-1.24
Communist Party of Denmark	525	0.95	-0.46
Communist Workers Party	85	0.15	-0.28
Socialist Workers Party	26	0.05	New
Total	55,499		

=== General elections in the 1970s ===
1979 Danish general election

Parties	Vote		
Parties	Votes	%	+ / -
Social Democrats	15,628	28.22	+0.05
Conservatives	11,813	21.33	+7.02
Venstre	6,954	12.56	+1.03
Progress Party	6,064	10.95	-5.36
Social Liberals	3,853	6.96	+2.65
Green Left	3,332	6.02	+2.13
Left Socialists	2,223	4.01	+0.55
Centre Democrats	2,194	3.96	-5.52
Justice Party of Denmark	1,415	2.55	-0.58
Christian People's Party	889	1.61	-0.60
Communist Party of Denmark	781	1.41	-1.26
Communist Workers Party	239	0.43	New
Total	55,385		

1977 Danish general election

Parties	Vote		
Parties	Votes	%	+ / -
Social Democrats	14,284	28.17	+8.45
Progress Party	8,272	16.31	+0.77
Conservatives	7,258	14.31	+5.26
Venstre	5,845	11.53	-17.58
Centre Democrats	4,805	9.48	+6.91
Social Liberals	2,184	4.31	-3.75
Green Left	1,973	3.89	-0.66
Left Socialists	1,755	3.46	+0.53
Justice Party of Denmark	1,588	3.13	+1.33
Communist Party of Denmark	1,356	2.67	-0.31
Christian People's Party	1,120	2.21	-1.42
Pensioners' Party	250	0.49	New
Kaj Boriths-Sørensen	17	0.03	New
Total	50,707		

1975 Danish general election

Parties	Vote		
Parties	Votes	%	+ / -
Venstre	13,741	29.11	+15.42
Social Democrats	9,307	19.72	+3.27
Progress Party	7,334	15.54	-3.15
Conservatives	4,271	9.05	-4.73
Social Liberals	3,805	8.06	-4.42
Green Left	2,148	4.55	-0.80
Christian People's Party	1,715	3.63	+1.07
Communist Party of Denmark	1,407	2.98	+0.07
Left Socialists	1,381	2.93	+0.94
Centre Democrats	1,211	2.57	-6.76
Justice Party of Denmark	850	1.80	-0.97
H. Lindholt	35	0.07	New
Total	47,205		

1973 Danish general election

Parties	Vote		
Parties	Votes	%	+ / -
Progress Party	8,517	18.69	New
Social Democrats	7,497	16.45	-8.91
Conservatives	6,280	13.78	-15.60
Venstre	6,241	13.69	-1.14
Social Liberals	5,689	12.48	-3.83
Centre Democrats	4,252	9.33	New
Green Left	2,437	5.35	-2.52
Communist Party of Denmark	1,328	2.91	+1.91
Justice Party of Denmark	1,261	2.77	+1.01
Christian People's Party	1,169	2.56	+1.46
Left Socialists	909	1.99	-0.40
Total	45,580		

1971 Danish general election

Parties	Vote		
Parties	Votes	%	+ / -
Conservatives	11,702	29.38	-4.53
Social Democrats	10,102	25.36	+1.47
Social Liberals	6,497	16.31	+1.34
Venstre	5,905	14.83	-2.37
Green Left	3,135	7.87	+3.77
Left Socialists	952	2.39	+0.22
Justice Party of Denmark	699	1.76	+1.34
Christian People's Party	437	1.10	New
Communist Party of Denmark	400	1.00	+0.28
Total	39,829		

=== General elections in the 1960s ===
1968 Danish general election

Parties	Vote		
Parties	Votes	%	+ / -
Conservatives	13,280	33.91	+4.46
Social Democrats	9,356	23.89	-4.75
Venstre	6,736	17.20	-2.90
Social Liberals	5,863	14.97	+7.88
Green Left	1,607	4.10	-3.89
Liberal Centre	860	2.20	-2.02
Left Socialists	850	2.17	New
Communist Party of Denmark	282	0.72	+0.07
Justice Party of Denmark	165	0.42	-0.06
Independent Party	162	0.41	-0.94
Total	39,161		

1966 Danish general election

Parties	Vote		
Parties	Votes	%	+ / -
Conservatives	10,702	29.45	+1.10
Social Democrats	10,406	28.64	-3.73
Venstre	7,303	20.10	-4.11
Green Left	2,905	7.99	+3.29
Social Liberals	2,578	7.09	+1.87
Liberal Centre	1,534	4.22	New
Independent Party	492	1.35	-1.23
Communist Party of Denmark	237	0.65	-0.40
Justice Party of Denmark	174	0.48	-0.53
Erik Hoffmeyer	5	0.01	New
Carl Møller	4	0.01	-0.04
P. Lüchow	0	0.00	-0.01
Total	36,340		

1964 Danish general election

Parties	Vote		
Parties	Votes	%	+ / -
Social Democrats	10,490	32.37	-3.44
Conservatives	9,187	28.35	+3.92
Venstre	7,846	24.21	+2.61
Social Liberals	1,690	5.22	-1.23
Green Left	1,523	4.70	-0.38
Independent Party	835	2.58	-1.35
Communist Party of Denmark	339	1.05	+0.06
Justice Party of Denmark	326	1.01	-0.69
Danish Unity	148	0.46	New
Carl Møller	16	0.05	New
P. Lüchow	4	0.01	New
Total	32,404		

1960 Danish general election

Parties	Vote		
Parties	Votes	%	+ / -
Social Democrats	9,793	35.81	+1.15
Conservatives	6,681	24.43	+2.15
Venstre	5,907	21.60	-4.19
Social Liberals	1,765	6.45	-1.17
Green Left	1,388	5.08	New
Independent Party	1,075	3.93	+1.95
Justice Party of Denmark	465	1.70	-3.76
Communist Party of Denmark	272	0.99	-1.21
Total	27,346		

=== General elections in the 1950s ===
1957 Danish general election

Parties	Vote		
Parties	Votes	%	+ / -
Social Democrats	8,208	34.66	-3.11
Venstre	6,109	25.79	+1.31
Conservatives	5,276	22.28	+0.55
Social Liberals	1,804	7.62	-0.45
Justice Party of Denmark	1,294	5.46	+2.79
Communist Party of Denmark	522	2.20	-0.62
Independent Party	470	1.98	-0.48
Total	23,683		

September 1953 Danish Folketing election

Parties	Vote		
Parties	Votes	%	+ / -
Social Democrats	7,901	37.77	+0.31
Venstre	5,121	24.48	+1.65
Conservatives	4,545	21.73	-1.14
Social Liberals	1,689	8.07	-0.99
Communist Party of Denmark	589	2.82	-0.34
Justice Party of Denmark	558	2.67	-1.18
Independent Party	515	2.46	New
Total	20,918		

April 1953 Danish Folketing election

Parties	Vote		
Parties	Votes	%	+ / -
Social Democrats	7,321	37.46	-0.75
Conservatives	4,469	22.87	-1.59
Venstre	4,461	22.83	+0.89
Social Liberals	1,770	9.06	+1.14
Justice Party of Denmark	753	3.85	-0.95
Communist Party of Denmark	617	3.16	+0.51
Danish Unity	150	0.77	New
Total	19,541		

1950 Danish Folketing election

Parties	Vote		
Parties	Votes	%	+ / -
Social Democrats	7,111	38.21	-1.02
Conservatives	4,552	24.46	+8.63
Venstre	4,083	21.94	-8.71
Social Liberals	1,474	7.92	+0.94
Justice Party of Denmark	894	4.80	+2.51
Communist Party of Denmark	494	2.65	-1.34
Total	18,608		

=== General elections in the 1940s ===
1947 Danish Folketing election

Parties	Vote		
Parties	Votes	%	+ / -
Social Democrats	7,045	39.23	+5.57
Venstre	5,504	30.65	+6.01
Conservatives	2,843	15.83	-5.59
Social Liberals	1,254	6.98	-1.73
Communist Party of Denmark	716	3.99	-3.69
Justice Party of Denmark	411	2.29	+1.37
Danish Unity	187	1.04	-1.95
Total	17,960		

1945 Danish Folketing election

Parties	Vote		
Parties	Votes	%	+ / -
Social Democrats	5,884	33.66	-8.87
Venstre	4,307	24.64	+8.24
Conservatives	3,744	21.42	-4.32
Social Liberals	1,522	8.71	+0.20
Communist Party of Denmark	1,342	7.68	New
Danish Unity	522	2.99	-0.61
Justice Party of Denmark	160	0.92	+0.37
Total	17,481		

1943 Danish Folketing election

Parties	Vote		
Parties	Votes	%	+ / -
Social Democrats	7,283	42.53	+1.82
Conservatives	4,408	25.74	+0.45
Venstre	2,809	16.40	-0.95
Social Liberals	1,457	8.51	-1.57
Danish Unity	617	3.60	+3.02
National Socialist Workers' Party of Denmark	386	2.25	+0.45
Justice Party of Denmark	94	0.55	-0.15
Farmers' Party	72	0.42	-1.35
Total	17,126		

=== General elections in the 1930s ===
1939 Danish Folketing election

Parties	Vote		
Parties	Votes	%	+ / -
Social Democrats	5,986	40.71	-2.16
Conservatives	3,719	25.29	-1.20
Venstre	2,551	17.35	+0.91
Social Liberals	1,482	10.08	-0.37
National Socialist Workers' Party of Denmark	264	1.80	+1.04
Farmers' Party	260	1.77	+0.37
National Cooperation	136	0.92	New
Communist Party of Denmark	119	0.81	+0.23
Justice Party of Denmark	103	0.70	-0.31
Danish Unity	85	0.58	New
Total	14,705		

1935 Danish Folketing election

Parties	Vote		
Parties	Votes	%	+ / -
Social Democrats	5,960	42.87	-1.43
Conservatives	3,682	26.49	+3.38
Venstre	2,286	16.44	-4.92
Social Liberals	1,453	10.45	+0.51
Independent People's Party	194	1.40	New
Justice Party of Denmark	140	1.01	+0.32
National Socialist Workers' Party of Denmark	106	0.76	New
Communist Party of Denmark	80	0.58	-0.03
Total	13,901		

1932 Danish Folketing election

Parties	Vote		
Parties	Votes	%	+ / -
Social Democrats	6,287	44.30	+6.07
Conservatives	3,280	23.11	-1.25
Venstre	3,031	21.36	-4.06
Social Liberals	1,410	9.94	-1.45
Justice Party of Denmark	98	0.69	+0.10
Communist Party of Denmark	86	0.61	New
Total	14,192		

=== General elections in the 1920s ===
1929 Danish Folketing election

Parties	Vote		
Parties	Votes	%	+ / -
Social Democrats	4,822	38.23	+4.34
Venstre	3,207	25.42	+1.84
Conservatives	3,073	24.36	-6.82
Social Liberals	1,437	11.39	+0.41
Justice Party of Denmark	75	0.59	+0.22
Total	12,614		

1926 Danish Folketing election

Parties	Vote		
Parties	Votes	%	+ / -
Social Democrats	4,070	33.89	-1.55
Conservatives	3,744	31.18	+3.19
Venstre	2,831	23.58	+2.13
Social Liberals	1,319	10.98	-1.38
Justice Party of Denmark	44	0.37	New
Independence Party	0	0.00	New
Total	12,008		

1924 Danish Folketing election

Parties	Vote		
Parties	Votes	%	+ / -
Social Democrats	4,061	35.44	+2.35
Conservatives	3,207	27.99	+0.59
Venstre	2,458	21.45	-5.12
Social Liberals	1,416	12.36	+2.57
Farmer Party	303	2.64	New
Communist Party of Denmark	13	0.11	New
Total	11,458		

September 1920 Danish Folketing election

Parties	Vote		
Parties	Votes	%	+ / -
Social Democrats	3,691	33.09	+2.98
Conservatives	3,056	27.40	-2.88
Venstre	2,964	26.57	-2.40
Social Liberals	1,092	9.79	+2.26
Industry Party	291	2.61	-0.40
Free Social Democrats	49	0.44	New
Total	11,154		

July 1920 Danish Folketing election

Parties	Vote		
Parties	Votes	%	+ / -
Conservatives	2,850	30.28	+0.54
Social Democrats	2,834	30.11	-0.01
Venstre	2,726	28.97	+1.61
Social Liberals	709	7.53	-1.32
Industry Party	283	3.01	-0.81
Daniel Nielsen	6	0.06	New
Total	9,411		

April 1920 Danish Folketing election

Parties	Vote	
Parties	Votes	%
Social Democrats	2,987	30.12
Conservatives	2,949	29.74
Venstre	2,713	27.36
Social Liberals	878	8.85
Industry Party	379	3.82
Elias S. Nielsen	10	0.10
Total	9,916	

== European Parliament elections results ==
2024 European Parliament election in Denmark

Parties	Vote		
Parties	Votes	%	+ / -
Venstre	5,530	17.65	-9.85
Conservatives	4,435	14.16	+0.23
Green Left	4,431	14.15	+3.28
Social Democrats	3,444	10.99	-2.96
Liberal Alliance	3,428	10.94	+7.42
Moderates	2,897	9.25	New
Social Liberals	2,838	9.06	-4.15
Danish People's Party	1,519	4.85	-3.72
Red–Green Alliance	1,327	4.24	+0.85
Denmark Democrats	843	2.69	New
The Alternative	632	2.02	-0.50
Total	31,324		

2019 European Parliament election in Denmark

Parties	Vote		
Parties	Votes	%	+ / -
Venstre	9,415	27.50	+7.11
Social Democrats	4,776	13.95	+0.54
Conservatives	4,769	13.93	-1.58
Social Liberals	4,522	13.21	+4.17
Green Left	3,722	10.87	+2.06
Danish People's Party	2,935	8.57	-14.03
Liberal Alliance	1,205	3.52	-1.97
Red–Green Alliance	1,161	3.39	New
People's Movement against the EU	864	2.52	-2.23
The Alternative	863	2.52	New
Total	34,232		

2014 European Parliament election in Denmark

Parties	Vote		
Parties	Votes	%	+ / -
Danish People's Party	6,646	22.60	+8.46
Venstre	5,996	20.39	-5.38
Conservatives	4,562	15.51	-4.32
Social Democrats	3,943	13.41	-1.01
Social Liberals	2,659	9.04	+3.23
Green Left	2,591	8.81	-3.22
Liberal Alliance	1,616	5.49	+4.59
People's Movement against the EU	1,397	4.75	-0.42
Total	29,410		

2009 European Parliament election in Denmark

Parties	Vote		
Parties	Votes	%	+ / -
Venstre	7,754	25.77	+5.32
Conservatives	5,966	19.83	-0.93
Social Democrats	4,339	14.42	-8.81
Danish People's Party	4,254	14.14	+7.34
Green Left	3,619	12.03	+4.59
Social Liberals	1,748	5.81	-2.38
People's Movement against the EU	1,554	5.17	+0.51
June Movement	582	1.93	-5.72
Liberal Alliance	270	0.90	New
Total	30,086		

2004 European Parliament election in Denmark

Parties	Vote		
Parties	Votes	%	+ / -
Social Democrats	9,778	23.23	+13.45
Conservatives	8,736	20.76	+7.63
Venstre	8,605	20.45	-8.51
Social Liberals	3,446	8.19	-2.78
June Movement	3,218	7.65	-5.99
Green Left	3,133	7.44	+1.65
Danish People's Party	2,861	6.80	+1.29
People's Movement against the EU	1,960	4.66	-1.88
Christian Democrats	349	0.83	-0.61
Total	42,086		

1999 European Parliament election in Denmark

Parties	Vote		
Parties	Votes	%	+ / -
Venstre	12,385	28.96	+10.00
June Movement	5,834	13.64	-0.24
Conservatives	5,615	13.13	-15.04
Social Liberals	4,689	10.97	+0.82
Social Democrats	4,182	9.78	+0.26
People's Movement against the EU	2,797	6.54	-1.20
Green Left	2,478	5.79	-1.82
Danish People's Party	2,358	5.51	New
Centre Democrats	1,810	4.23	+3.13
Christian Democrats	615	1.44	+0.77
Progress Party	199	0.47	-1.74
Total	42,763		

1994 European Parliament election in Denmark

Parties	Vote		
Parties	Votes	%	+ / -
Conservatives	12,336	28.17	+6.19
Venstre	8,304	18.96	+1.32
June Movement	6,080	13.88	New
Social Liberals	4,444	10.15	+6.95
Social Democrats	4,170	9.52	-5.71
People's Movement against the EU	3,388	7.74	-9.23
Green Left	3,334	7.61	+0.14
Progress Party	966	2.21	-1.94
Centre Democrats	482	1.10	-10.41
Christian Democrats	295	0.67	-1.19
Total	43,799		

1989 European Parliament election in Denmark

Parties	Vote		
Parties	Votes	%	+ / -
Conservatives	7,996	21.98	-11.88
Venstre	6,417	17.64	+8.88
People's Movement against the EU	6,173	16.97	-3.84
Social Democrats	5,542	15.23	+3.22
Centre Democrats	4,188	11.51	+4.26
Green Left	2,717	7.47	-0.07
Progress Party	1,511	4.15	+1.02
Social Liberals	1,163	3.20	-0.38
Christian Democrats	678	1.86	+0.04
Total	36,385		

1984 European Parliament election in Denmark

Parties	Vote	
Parties	Votes	%
Conservatives	12,953	33.86
People's Movement against the EU	7,961	20.81
Social Democrats	4,596	12.01
Venstre	3,353	8.76
Green Left	2,884	7.54
Centre Democrats	2,774	7.25
Social Liberals	1,369	3.58
Progress Party	1,197	3.13
Christian Democrats	696	1.82
Left Socialists	476	1.24
Total	38,259	

== Referendums ==
2022 Danish European Union opt-out referendum

Option	Votes	%
✓ YES	25,446	75.81
X NO	8,121	24.19

2015 Danish European Union opt-out referendum

Option	Votes	%
✓ YES	18,271	60.91
X NO	11,727	39.09

2014 Danish Unified Patent Court membership referendum

Option	Votes	%
✓ YES	20,866	72.57
X NO	7,887	27.43

2009 Danish Act of Succession referendum

Option	Votes	%
✓ YES	23,743	86.50
X NO	3,707	13.50

2000 Danish euro referendum

Option	Votes	%
✓ YES	39,102	57.30
X NO	29,140	42.70

1998 Danish Amsterdam Treaty referendum

Option	Votes	%
✓ YES	38,328	63.21
X NO	22,312	36.79

1993 Danish Maastricht Treaty referendum

Option	Votes	%
✓ YES	42,763	64.76
X NO	23,272	35.24

1992 Danish Maastricht Treaty referendum

Option	Votes	%
✓ YES	38,118	59.82
X NO	25,605	40.18

1986 Danish Single European Act referendum

Option	Votes	%
✓ YES	35,451	59.31
X NO	24,324	40.69

1972 Danish European Communities membership referendum

Option	Votes	%
✓ YES	44,008	59.63
X NO	29,793	40.37

1953 Danish constitutional and electoral age referendum

Option	Votes	%
✓ YES	11,822	78.21
X NO	3,294	21.79
23 years	8,947	57.47
21 years	6,621	42.53

1939 Danish constitutional referendum

Option	Votes	%
✓ YES	8,227	92.50
X NO	667	7.50
