= Edinburgh Agreement (1992) =

European Union agreement on opt-outs for countries

The Edinburgh Agreement or Edinburgh Decision is a December 1992 agreement reached at a European Council meeting in Edinburgh, Scotland, that granted Denmark four exceptions to the Maastricht Treaty so that it could be ratified by Denmark. This was necessary because, without all member states of the European Union ratifying it, it could not come into effect. Denmark had first rejected the Maastricht treaty, but with the addition of the Edinburgh Agreement, ratified the treaty in a 1993 referendum. The member states that had already ratified the Maastricht Treaty did not have to do so again.

Denmark obtained four opt-outs from the Maastricht Treaty following the treaty's initial rejection in a 1992 referendum. The opt-outs are outlined in the Edinburgh Agreement and concern the Economic and Monetary Union (EMU), the Common Security and Defence Policy (CSDP), Justice and Home Affairs (JHA) and the citizenship of the European Union. With these opt-outs the Danish people accepted the treaty in a second referendum held in 1993. On 1 June 2022, Denmark abolished its opt-out from the CSDP.

The EMU opt-out means Denmark is not obliged to participate in the third phase of the European Exchange Rate Mechanism, i.e. to replace the Danish krone with the euro. The abolition of the euro opt-out was put to a referendum in 2000 and was rejected. The opt-out from the CSDP, also known as the "defence opt-out", originally meant Denmark would not be obliged to join the Western European Union (which originally handled the defence tasks of the EU). The abolition of the defence opt-out was put to a referendum on 1 June 2022, where Denmark voted to abolish it. Until 1 June 2022, the defence opt-out meant that Denmark did not participate in the European Union's foreign policy where defence is concerned. Denmark did not take part in decisions nor act in that area. It did not contribute troops to missions conducted under the auspices of the European Union, and did not participate in the European Defence Agency. The JHA opt-out exempts Denmark from certain areas of home affairs. Significant parts of these areas were transferred from the third European Union pillar to the first under the Amsterdam Treaty; Denmark's opt-outs from these areas were kept valid through additional protocols, so they now have an opt-out from the Area of freedom, security and justice. Acts made under those powers are not binding on Denmark except for those relating to Schengen, which are instead conducted on an intergovernmental basis with Denmark. Under the Treaty of Lisbon, Denmark can change its JHA opt-out from a complete opt-out to the case-by-case opt-in version applying to Ireland whenever it wishes. The citizenship opt-out stated that European citizenship did not replace national citizenship; this opt-out was rendered meaningless when the Amsterdam Treaty adopted the same wording for all members.

The four exceptions granted to Denmark are as follows:

== Section A: Citizenship ==
The provisions of Part Two of the Treaty establishing the European Community relating to citizenship of the Union give nationals of the Member States additional rights and protection as specified in that Part. They do not in any way take the place of national citizenship. Whether an individual possesses the nationality of a Member State will be settled solely by reference to the national law of the Member State concerned.

While this opt-out is still officially in force, the adoption of Treaty of Amsterdam (which includes a similar provision applying to all member states) makes the citizenship opt-out effectively moot.

== Section B: Economic and monetary union ==
The Protocol on certain provisions relating to Denmark attached to the Treaty establishing the European Community gives Denmark the right to notify the Council of the European Communities of its position concerning participation in the third stage of Economic and monetary union. Denmark has given notification that it will not participate in the third stage. This notification will take effect upon the coming into effect of this decision.

As a consequence, Denmark will not participate in the single currency, will not be bound by the rules concerning economic policy which apply only to the Member States participating in the third stage of Economic and Monetary Union, and will retain its existing powers in the field of monetary policy according to its national laws and regulations, including powers of the National Bank of Denmark in the field of monetary policy.

Denmark will participate fully in the second stage of Economic and Monetary Union and will continue to participate in exchange-rate cooperation within the EMS.

Note: The benefit of this exception is also debatable. Some other EU members have opted out of the common currency without an agreed exception. Sweden for instance does not have its own exception, whereas the United Kingdom did.

== Section C: Defence policy ==
On 1 June 2022, Denmark held a referendum on the abolition of this opt-out. The referendum resulted in the abolition of the defence opt-out.

Until the 2022 referendum, the Heads of State and Government noted that, in response to the invitation from the Western European Union (WEU), Denmark had become an observer to that organisation. They also noted that nothing in the Treaty on European Union committed Denmark to become a member of the WEU. Accordingly, Denmark did not participate in the elaboration and the implementation of decisions and actions of the Union which have defence implications, but would not prevent the development of closer cooperation between Member States in this area.

== Section D: Justice and home affairs ==
Denmark will participate fully in cooperation on Justice and Home Affairs on the basis of the provisions of title VI of the Treaty on European Union.
