= 1992 Danish Maastricht Treaty referendum =

- 2 June 1992

Results
Choice	Votes	%
Yes	1,606,442	49.28%
No	1,653,289	50.72%
Valid votes	3,259,731	99.06%
Invalid or blank votes	30,879	0.94%
Total votes	3,290,610	100.00%
Registered voters/turnout	3,962,005	83.05%
- Results of the referendum Yes: 50–55% 55–60% 60–65% 70%+ No: 50–55% 55–60% 60–65% 65–70% 70%+

A referendum on the Maastricht Treaty for the founding of the European Union was held in Denmark on 2 June 1992. The treaty was rejected by 50.7% of voters with a turnout of 83.1%. This meant a serious hurdle on the way in the process of further European integration, which nevertheless did continue because all twelve member states did want to ratify.

The result of the referendum, along with the "petit oui" in the French Maastricht referendum did however signal a new stadium in European integration, away from the "permissive consensus" which had existed in most of the memberstates until then. Integration mainly did occur through strategic negotiations between the Member States or through functional adaptation of the system. Now the question of democracy as an explanatory variable had to be taken into consideration. This was expressed by Pascal Lamy, chef de cabinet for Jacques Delors, the president of the European Commission, who after the Danish referendum remarked that, "Europe was built in a Saint-Simonian [i.e., technocratic] way from the beginning, this was Monnet's approach: The people weren't ready to agree to integration, so you had to get on without telling them too much about what was happening. Now Saint-Simonianism is finished. It can't work when you have to face democratic opinion."

From this point forward issues relating to European integration were subject to deeper discussions across much of Europe. Some years later overt euroscepticism gained prominence. Besides Denmark only France and Ireland held referendums on the Maastricht Treaty ratification.

As the Maastricht Treaty could only come into effect if all members of the European Union ratified it, negotiations were set up in the months following the referendum. This resulted in the Edinburgh Agreement, providing Denmark with four exceptions or opt-outs from close co-operation in certain policy fields which eventually led to Denmark ratifying the Maastricht Treaty in a 1993 referendum.

== Results ==
Choice	Votes	%
For	1,606,442	49.28
Against	1,653,289	50.72
Total	3,259,731	100.00
Valid votes	3,259,731	99.06
Invalid/blank votes	30,879	0.94
Total votes	3,290,610	100.00
Registered voters/turnout	3,962,005	83.05
Source: Nohlen & Stöver

=== By county ===
Region	For		Against		Invalid/ blank	Total	Registered voters	Turnout
Region	Votes	%	Votes	%	Invalid/ blank	Total	Registered voters	Turnout
Copenhagen & Frederiksberg Municipality	137,578	38.3	221,515	61.7	3,552	362,645	444,174	81.6
Copenhagen County	191,954	48.9	200,458	51.1	3,125	395,537	458,562	86.3
Frederiksborg County	117,367	53.5	101,990	46.5	1,787	221,144	258,239	85.6
Roskilde County	74,092	51.6	69,423	48.4	1,159	144,674	167,297	86.5
West Zealand County	87,208	48.6	92,084	51.4	1,659	180,951	219,313	82.5
Storstrøm County	80,288	48.4	85,692	51.6	1,732	167,712	200,875	83.5
Bornholm County	13,474	49.3	13,875	50.7	440	27,789	35,020	79.4
Fyn County	141,626	48.1	152,999	51.9	2,878	297,503	358,277	83.0
South Jutland County	83,596	54.1	71,052	45.9	1,468	156,116	189,094	82.6
Ribe County	71,337	53.7	61,576	46.3	1,374	134,287	165,303	81.2
Vejle County	108,602	51.9	100,495	48.1	2,051	211,148	254,984	82.8
Ringkjøbing County	94,082	57.5	69,639	42.5	1,763	165,484	200,501	82.5
Århus County	187,219	48.7	197,130	51.3	3,543	387,892	463,044	83.8
Viborg County	75,392	53.6	65,222	46.4	1,629	142,243	174,357	81.6
North Jutland County	142,627	48.7	150,139	51.3	2,719	295,485	372,965	79.2
Source: European Election Database

== Edinburgh agreement: opt-outs ==
The opt-outs are outlined in the Edinburgh Agreement and concern the EMU, the Common Security and Defence Policy (CSDP), Justice and Home Affairs (JHA) and the citizenship of the European Union. With these opt-outs the Danish people accepted the treaty in a second referendum held in 1993.

The EMU opt-out meant Denmark was not obliged to participate in the third phase of the European Exchange Rate Mechanism, i.e. to replace the Danish krone with the euro. The abolition of the euro opt-out was put to a referendum in 2000 and was rejected. The CSDP opt-out originally meant Denmark would not be obliged to join the Western European Union (which originally handled the defence tasks of the EU). Now it means that Denmark does not participate in the European Union's foreign policy where defence is concerned. Hence it does not take part in decisions, does not act in that area and does not contribute troops to missions conducted under the auspices of the European Union. The JHA opt-out exempts Denmark from certain areas of home affairs.

Significant parts of these areas were transferred from the third European Union pillar to the first under the Amsterdam Treaty; Denmark's opt-outs from these areas were kept valid through additional protocols. Acts made under those powers are not binding on Denmark except for those relating to Schengen, which are instead conducted on an intergovernmental basis with Denmark. The citizenship opt-out stated that European citizenship did not replace national citizenship; this opt-out was rendered meaningless when the Amsterdam Treaty adopted the same wording for all members. Under the Treaty of Lisbon, Denmark can change its opt-out from a complete opt-out to the case-by-case opt-in version that applies to Ireland whenever they wish.

== Aftermath ==
The June Movement, a Danish eurosceptic party and political organization was founded immediately after the referendum, and takes its name from the event.
