= 2000 Danish euro referendum =

- 28 September 2000

Results
Choice	Votes	%
Yes	1,620,353	46.79%
No	1,842,814	53.21%
Valid votes	3,463,167	98.85%
Invalid or blank votes	40,358	1.15%
Total votes	3,503,525	100.00%
Registered voters/turnout	3,999,325	87.6%
- Results by nomination district and constituency Yes: 50–55% 55–60% 60–65% 65–70% No: 50–55% 55–60% 60–65%

A referendum on joining the Eurozone was held in Denmark on 28 September 2000. It was rejected by 53.2% of voters with a turnout of 87.60%.

== Background ==
On 2 June 1992, Danish voters rejected the Maastricht Treaty in a referendum. On 18 May 1993, Denmark ratified an amended treaty following the Edinburgh Agreement. This meant that, among three other areas, Denmark would not be part of the European Monetary Union (EMU). In March 2000, as the euro was being launched, the Danish government led by Poul Nyrup Rasmussen, a supporter of the common currency, decided to hold a referendum on Danish entry into the monetary union. In May 2000 the government tabled the bill. According to the bill, if the outcome of the referendum was in favour of the adoption of the euro, Denmark would be able to join the euro area from 1 January 2002 with the euro as "book money". Euro banknotes and coins would be introduced as from 1 January 2004, after which krone banknotes and coins would be withdrawn.

The largest political parties, including the opposition Liberals (V) and Conservatives (DKP/K), were all in favour of entering the EMU. So were the industrial and banking sectors and the majority of labour unions. Only one national paper (Ekstra Bladet) came out against EMU. Five political parties did oppose EMU: two right-wing parties (the Danish People’s Party and the Progress Party), two left-wing parties (The Socialist People's Party and The Red-Green Alliance) and the centre-right Christian People’s Party. However, these parties were all relatively small and represented only 39 of 179 seats in Parliament at the time).

== Campaign ==
When the referendum was called, support for the "Yes" side was just below 50% while the "No" side was just below 40% according to opinion polls. However, public opinion shifted and from June 2000 until the referendum in September all polls showed 15–20 per cent undecided and an almost fifty-fifty split between EMU-supporters and EMU-sceptics.

Several events eroded support for the "Yes" side:

- The release of the Danish Economic Council's semi-annual report in May which concluded "the economic benefits to be reaped from EMU membership were uncertain and small and that the EMU could best be described as a political project." This report had a major influence on the debate and undermined the "Yes" campaign's narrative that EMU was vital for the economy.
- EU sanctioning of Austria following the formation of a government coalition between the Conservative Wolfgang Schüssel and the Freedom Party of Jörg Haider in Austria was unpopular in Denmark and undermined trust in both the EU and the Prime Minister who had agreed to the sanctions. (This was widely seen as an unwarranted intervention in the democratic process of a small member state).
- The euro had dropped 25% in value against the US dollar since its introduction in 1999, creating concern about its viability.
- The Prime Minister had tried to argue Denmark could unilaterally leave the euro if it chose, but was contradicted by the European Commission, again undermining his credibility.
- The governor of the Danish Central Bank, Bodil Nyboe-Andersen, argued on television that contrary to "Yes" side arguments, the Danish representative on the ECB Council would not act as a "Danish" representative.
- Fears arose about the ultimate effect of EMU on the Danish welfare state and pensions, which the PM could not assuage.
- At least some of the vote was simply against the government, which had been in power for eight years by that point and would be swept out of power the following autumn in 2001.

== Results ==
Choice	Votes	%
For	1,620,353	46.79
Against	1,842,814	53.21
Total	3,463,167	100.00
Valid votes	3,463,167	98.85
Invalid/blank votes	40,358	1.15
Total votes	3,503,525	100.00
Registered voters/turnout	3,999,325	87.60
Source: Nohlen & Stöver

=== By county ===
Region	For	Against	Electorate	Votes	% For
Copenhagen & Frederiksberg Municipality	169,154	201,263	446,155	376,291	44.9%
Copenhagen County	188,824	207,026	450,043	399,864	47.2%
Frederiksborg County	120,627	117,546	269,775	240,562	50.1%
Roskilde County	74,487	79,871	173,068	155,940	47.8%
West Zealand County	81,899	112,501	223,692	196,344	41.7%
Storstrøm County	73,936	100,523	200,123	176,294	41.9%
Bornholm County	11,662	16,752	33,747	28,845	40.4%
Fyn County	142,461	166,395	357,537	312,237	45.6%
South Jutland County	78,914	83,912	187,254	164,610	48.0%
Ribe County	68,533	74,856	165,339	144,953	47.3%
Vejle County	107,277	118,464	260,740	229,162	46.8%
Ringkjøbing County	88,400	86,837	202,362	177,280	49.9%
Århus County	202,714	213,946	479,278	421,747	48.0%
Viborg County	71,856	79,198	175,053	152,902	47.0%
North Jutland County	139,609	183,724	375,159	326,494	42.8%
Source: European Election Database

== See also ==
- Denmark and the euro
