= 1993 Danish Maastricht Treaty referendum =

- 18 May 1993

Results
Choice	Votes	%
Yes	1,930,391	56.74%
No	1,471,914	43.26%
Valid votes	3,402,305	98.99%
Invalid or blank votes	34,635	1.01%
Total votes	3,436,940	100.00%
Registered voters/turnout	3,974,672	86.47%
- Results by nomination district and constituency Yes: 50–55% 55–60% 60–65% 65–70% 70%+ No: 50–55% 55–60% 60–65%

A second referendum on the Maastricht Treaty was held in Denmark on 18 May 1993. After rejecting the treaty in a referendum the previous year, this time it was approved by 56.7% of voters with an 86.5% turnout.

== Background ==
It was the second attempt to ratify the Maastricht Treaty, which could not come into effect unless ratified by all members of the European Union. Thus, the Edinburgh Agreement granted Denmark four exceptions from the Maastricht Treaty, leading to its eventual ratification.

== Results ==
Choice	Votes	%
For	1,930,391	56.7
Against	1,471,914	43.3
Invalid/blank votes	34,635	–
Total	3,436,940	100
Registered voters/turnout	3,974,672	86.5
Source: Nohlen & Stöver

=== By county ===
Region	For		Against		Invalid/ blank	Total	Registered voters	Turnout
Region	Votes	%	Votes	%	Invalid/ blank	Total	Registered voters	Turnout
Copenhagen & Frederiksberg Municipality	165,469	44.69	204,789	55.31	4,239	374,497	443,444	84.45
Copenhagen County	223,328	55.43	179,589	44.57	3,601	406,518	457,930	88.77
Frederiksborg County	135,740	59.46	92,565	40.54	1,997	230,302	260,378	88.45
Roskilde County	87,768	58.95	61,117	41.05	1,311	150,196	168,528	89.12
West Zealand County	103,915	55.41	83,624	44.59	1,735	189,274	220,084	86.00
Storstrøm County	94,826	55.03	77,490	44.97	1,782	174,098	201,278	86.50
Bornholm County	15,086	53.02	13,366	46.98	415	28,867	34,814	82.92
Fyn County	172,454	56.22	134,317	43.78	3,027	309,798	359,711	86.12
South Jutland County	99,832	61.46	62,609	38.54	1,715	164,156	189,625	86.57
Ribe County	86,284	61.25	54,577	38.75	1,520	142,381	165,827	85.86
Vejle County	133,247	60.77	86,022	39.23	2,327	221,596	256,213	86.49
Ringkjøbing County	114,210	66.42	57,733	33.58	1,989	173,932	201,622	86.27
Århus County	230,835	57.40	171,303	42.60	4,336	406,474	466,296	87.17
Viborg County	92,493	62.79	54,810	37.21	1,719	149,022	174,791	85.26
North Jutland County	174,904	55.90	138,003	44.10	2,922	315,829	374,131	84.42
Source: European Election Database

== Aftermath ==
When the result of the referendum was announced, the outcome and frustrations about the referendum being held only a year after the Danes had rejected the previous treaty led to riots in the Nørrebro area of Copenhagen, during which police shot and wounded at least 11 people "to prevent an injured colleague being stoned to death". These 11 people, not in critical conditions, were subsequently treated for gunshot wounds as a result of the shooting. 90 police officers were injured during the riots.
