= Frederikshavn (nomination district) =

- Frederikshavn
- Nomination district constituency for the Folketing
- Location of Frederikshavn within North Jutland

- Location of North Jutland within Denmark
- Municipalities: Frederikshavn; Læsø
- Constituency: North Jutland
- Electorate: 46,519 (2022)

Current constituency
- Created: 1849 (as constituency); 1920 (as nomination district)

Frederikshavn nominating district is one of the 92 nominating districts that exists for Danish elections following the 2007 municipal reform. It consists of Frederikshavn and Læsø municipality. It was created in 1849 as a constituency, and has been a nomination district since 1920, though its boundaries have been changed since then.

While parties of the often nicknamed blue bloc has received more votes than the red bloc in all the general elections, the Social Democrats has always been the largest party and it became the nominating district where they received their 2nd highest share of votes in the 2022 election.

== General elections results ==
=== General elections in the 2020s ===
2022 Danish general election

Parties	Vote		
Parties	Votes	%	+ / -
Social Democrats	14,726	39.03	+1.05
Denmark Democrats	6,468	17.14	New
Venstre	4,748	12.58	-12.76
Moderates	2,289	6.07	New
Liberal Alliance	2,159	5.72	+4.51
New Right	1,756	4.65	+1.96
Green Left	1,533	4.06	+0.24
Conservatives	1,429	3.79	-0.91
Danish People's Party	1,012	2.68	-9.63
Red–Green Alliance	658	1.74	-1.51
Social Liberals	359	0.95	-1.91
The Alternative	346	0.92	-0.27
Christian Democrats	182	0.48	-1.30
Independent Greens	33	0.09	New
Jette Møller	30	0.08	New
Total	37,728		

=== General elections in the 2010s ===
2019 Danish general election

Parties	Vote		
Parties	Votes	%	+ / -
Social Democrats	14,621	37.98	+6.10
Venstre	9,755	25.34	+3.22
Danish People's Party	4,741	12.31	-14.51
Conservatives	1,811	4.70	+2.65
Green Left	1,470	3.82	+1.16
Red–Green Alliance	1,251	3.25	-2.06
Social Liberals	1,101	2.86	+0.87
New Right	1,036	2.69	New
Stram Kurs	812	2.11	New
Christian Democrats	686	1.78	+0.88
Liberal Alliance	464	1.21	-3.24
The Alternative	457	1.19	-0.62
Klaus Riskær Pedersen Party	293	0.76	New
Total	38,498		

2015 Danish general election

Parties	Vote		
Parties	Votes	%	+ / -
Social Democrats	12,810	31.88	-1.82
Danish People's Party	10,777	26.82	+12.76
Venstre	8,887	22.12	-5.57
Red–Green Alliance	2,133	5.31	+1.82
Liberal Alliance	1,788	4.45	+1.09
Green Left	1,068	2.66	-5.07
Conservatives	823	2.05	-2.44
Social Liberals	801	1.99	-2.73
The Alternative	729	1.81	New
Christian Democrats	362	0.90	+0.16
Hans Schultz	7	0.02	0.00
Total	40,185		

2011 Danish general election

Parties	Vote		
Parties	Votes	%	+ / -
Social Democrats	14,069	33.70	+1.89
Venstre	11,560	27.69	+1.54
Danish People's Party	5,869	14.06	-2.64
Green Left	3,227	7.73	-0.43
Social Liberals	1,970	4.72	+2.01
Conservatives	1,876	4.49	-6.92
Red–Green Alliance	1,456	3.49	+2.80
Liberal Alliance	1,403	3.36	+1.99
Christian Democrats	310	0.74	-0.23
Hans Schultz	8	0.02	+0.02
Total	41,748		

=== General elections in the 2000s ===
2007 Danish general election

Parties	Vote		
Parties	Votes	%	+ / -
Social Democrats	13,193	31.81	-1.60
Venstre	10,846	26.15	+0.62
Danish People's Party	6,926	16.70	+1.46
Conservatives	4,731	11.41	-0.63
Green Left	3,382	8.16	+4.77
Social Liberals	1,125	2.71	-2.80
New Alliance	568	1.37	New
Christian Democrats	404	0.97	-1.05
Red–Green Alliance	288	0.69	-1.10
Anders Gravers Pedersen	4	0.01	New
Hans Schultz	2	0.00	New
Total	41,469		

2005 Danish general election

Parties	Vote		
Parties	Votes	%	+ / -
Social Democrats	9,892	33.39	+0.49
Venstre	7,560	25.52	-2.98
Danish People's Party	4,513	15.23	+1.71
Conservatives	3,564	12.03	+0.64
Social Liberals	1,633	5.51	+2.63
Green Left	1,003	3.39	-0.66
Christian Democrats	597	2.02	-0.82
Red–Green Alliance	531	1.79	+0.17
Centre Democrats	275	0.93	-0.79
Minority Party	42	0.14	New
Ivan Johansen	9	0.03	New
Christian Jensen	5	0.02	New
Aase Heskjær	2	0.01	New
Total	29,626		

2001 Danish general election

Parties	Vote		
Parties	Votes	%	+ / -
Social Democrats	10,346	32.90	-9.17
Venstre	8,963	28.50	+5.25
Danish People's Party	4,251	13.52	+9.23
Conservatives	3,582	11.39	+5.75
Green Left	1,275	4.05	-0.75
Social Liberals	906	2.88	+0.71
Christian People's Party	894	2.84	+0.18
Centre Democrats	541	1.72	-1.84
Red–Green Alliance	508	1.62	+0.19
Progress Party	180	0.57	-9.29
Total	31,446		

=== General elections in the 1990s ===
1998 Danish general election

Parties	Vote		
Parties	Votes	%	+ / -
Social Democrats	13,404	42.07	-0.44
Venstre	7,407	23.25	+0.37
Progress Party	3,141	9.86	+0.84
Conservatives	1,797	5.64	-5.53
Green Left	1,530	4.80	+0.29
Danish People's Party	1,368	4.29	New
Centre Democrats	1,133	3.56	+0.84
Christian People's Party	848	2.66	+0.31
Social Liberals	692	2.17	-0.78
Red–Green Alliance	456	1.43	-0.42
Democratic Renewal	73	0.23	New
Henrik Westergaard	10	0.03	New
Total	31,859		

1994 Danish general election

Parties	Vote		
Parties	Votes	%	+ / -
Social Democrats	13,453	42.51	-3.51
Venstre	7,239	22.88	+8.91
Conservatives	3,536	11.17	-2.31
Progress Party	2,853	9.02	+1.31
Green Left	1,427	4.51	-0.60
Social Liberals	934	2.95	+0.36
Centre Democrats	860	2.72	-1.95
Christian People's Party	743	2.35	-0.71
Red–Green Alliance	586	1.85	+1.26
Steen W. Jakobsen	6	0.02	New
Svend Jensen	5	0.02	New
Henning Sørensen	2	0.01	New
Total	31,644		

1990 Danish general election

Parties	Vote		
Parties	Votes	%	+ / -
Social Democrats	14,288	46.02	+9.01
Venstre	4,339	13.97	+3.51
Conservatives	4,184	13.48	-5.04
Progress Party	2,394	7.71	-2.06
Green Left	1,586	5.11	-3.93
Centre Democrats	1,450	4.67	-0.09
Christian People's Party	949	3.06	+0.22
Social Liberals	803	2.59	-1.37
Common Course	512	1.65	-0.31
Red–Green Alliance	184	0.59	New
Justice Party of Denmark	171	0.55	New
The Greens	168	0.54	-0.50
P. H. Bering	16	0.05	New
Humanist Party	6	0.02	New
Total	31,050		

=== General elections in the 1980s ===
1988 Danish general election

Parties	Vote		
Parties	Votes	%	+ / -
Social Democrats	11,920	37.01	+0.12
Conservatives	5,963	18.52	-1.58
Venstre	3,369	10.46	-0.17
Progress Party	3,146	9.77	+4.87
Green Left	2,910	9.04	-1.37
Centre Democrats	1,533	4.76	+0.24
Social Liberals	1,274	3.96	-0.30
Christian People's Party	915	2.84	-0.36
Common Course	632	1.96	-0.45
The Greens	334	1.04	+0.14
Communist Party of Denmark	126	0.39	-0.11
Left Socialists	82	0.25	-0.27
Total	32,204		

1987 Danish general election

Parties	Vote		
Parties	Votes	%	+ / -
Social Democrats	12,034	36.89	-0.03
Conservatives	6,559	20.10	-3.19
Venstre	3,467	10.63	-1.36
Green Left	3,396	10.41	+2.30
Progress Party	1,597	4.90	+0.33
Centre Democrats	1,476	4.52	-0.37
Social Liberals	1,390	4.26	+0.92
Christian People's Party	1,043	3.20	-0.75
Common Course	785	2.41	New
The Greens	293	0.90	New
Left Socialists	171	0.52	-0.54
Communist Party of Denmark	162	0.50	+0.09
Justice Party of Denmark	159	0.49	-0.91
Humanist Party	66	0.20	New
Jytte Østerbye	15	0.05	New
Socialist Workers Party	6	0.02	-0.03
Marxist–Leninists Party	5	0.02	-0.01
Total	32,624		

1984 Danish general election

Parties	Vote		
Parties	Votes	%	+ / -
Social Democrats	12,131	36.92	-1.68
Conservatives	7,651	23.29	+11.79
Venstre	3,938	11.99	+1.03
Green Left	2,666	8.11	-0.52
Centre Democrats	1,606	4.89	-4.21
Progress Party	1,502	4.57	-6.69
Christian People's Party	1,297	3.95	+0.26
Social Liberals	1,097	3.34	+0.33
Justice Party of Denmark	459	1.40	+0.04
Left Socialists	347	1.06	-0.03
Communist Party of Denmark	134	0.41	-0.27
Socialist Workers Party	18	0.05	+0.02
Marxist–Leninists Party	10	0.03	New
Total	32,856		

1981 Danish general election

Parties	Vote		
Parties	Votes	%	+ / -
Social Democrats	11,693	38.60	-3.77
Conservatives	3,483	11.50	+1.11
Progress Party	3,412	11.26	-3.50
Venstre	3,321	10.96	-1.33
Centre Democrats	2,757	9.10	+6.04
Green Left	2,615	8.63	+4.36
Christian People's Party	1,117	3.69	-0.41
Social Liberals	912	3.01	-0.17
Justice Party of Denmark	411	1.36	-1.05
Left Socialists	330	1.09	-0.61
Communist Party of Denmark	206	0.68	-0.59
Communist Workers Party	22	0.07	-0.12
Socialist Workers Party	10	0.03	New
Total	30,289		

=== General elections in the 1970s ===
1979 Danish general election

Parties	Vote		
Parties	Votes	%	+ / -
Social Democrats	12,737	42.37	+5.12
Progress Party	4,438	14.76	-4.28
Venstre	3,695	12.29	+0.37
Conservatives	3,123	10.39	+3.23
Green Left	1,283	4.27	+1.46
Christian People's Party	1,231	4.10	-1.17
Social Liberals	956	3.18	+1.07
Centre Democrats	921	3.06	-3.00
Justice Party of Denmark	725	2.41	-0.99
Left Socialists	510	1.70	+0.53
Communist Party of Denmark	383	1.27	-1.62
Communist Workers Party	58	0.19	New
Total	30,060		

1977 Danish general election

Parties	Vote		
Parties	Votes	%	+ / -
Social Democrats	10,847	37.25	+6.91
Progress Party	5,543	19.04	-0.14
Venstre	3,470	11.92	-10.85
Conservatives	2,084	7.16	+2.36
Centre Democrats	1,763	6.06	+4.25
Christian People's Party	1,535	5.27	-2.82
Justice Party of Denmark	989	3.40	+1.71
Communist Party of Denmark	842	2.89	-0.37
Green Left	818	2.81	-0.04
Social Liberals	613	2.11	-2.17
Left Socialists	340	1.17	+0.23
Pensioners' Party	272	0.93	New
Total	29,116		

1975 Danish general election

Parties	Vote		
Parties	Votes	%	+ / -
Social Democrats	8,646	30.34	+4.70
Venstre	6,491	22.77	+10.83
Progress Party	5,467	19.18	-4.28
Christian People's Party	2,305	8.09	+1.09
Conservatives	1,368	4.80	-3.06
Social Liberals	1,219	4.28	-3.22
Communist Party of Denmark	929	3.26	+0.66
Green Left	811	2.85	-0.73
Centre Democrats	515	1.81	-4.78
Justice Party of Denmark	482	1.69	-1.13
Left Socialists	268	0.94	0.00
Total	28,501		

1973 Danish general election

Parties	Vote		
Parties	Votes	%	+ / -
Social Democrats	7,386	25.64	-15.68
Progress Party	6,758	23.46	New
Venstre	3,441	11.94	-6.00
Conservatives	2,264	7.86	-7.35
Social Liberals	2,162	7.50	-2.99
Christian People's Party	2,017	7.00	+2.78
Centre Democrats	1,898	6.59	New
Green Left	1,032	3.58	-3.35
Justice Party of Denmark	813	2.82	+1.06
Communist Party of Denmark	750	2.60	+1.18
Left Socialists	271	0.94	+0.22
Alex Larsen	18	0.06	New
Total	28,810		

1971 Danish general election

Parties	Vote		
Parties	Votes	%	+ / -
Social Democrats	10,861	41.32	+7.60
Venstre	4,716	17.94	-8.94
Conservatives	3,997	15.21	-3.34
Social Liberals	2,758	10.49	-0.97
Green Left	1,821	6.93	+1.69
Christian People's Party	1,109	4.22	New
Justice Party of Denmark	462	1.76	+0.92
Communist Party of Denmark	373	1.42	+0.67
Left Socialists	190	0.72	-0.24
Total	26,287		

=== General elections in the 1960s ===
1968 Danish general election

Parties	Vote		
Parties	Votes	%	+ / -
Social Democrats	9,789	33.72	-5.59
Venstre	7,804	26.88	+1.37
Conservatives	5,385	18.55	+1.50
Social Liberals	3,328	11.46	+6.99
Green Left	1,522	5.24	-3.17
Liberal Centre	297	1.02	-0.74
Left Socialists	279	0.96	New
Justice Party of Denmark	245	0.84	-0.05
Communist Party of Denmark	219	0.75	+0.20
Independent Party	160	0.55	-1.49
Total	29,028		

1966 Danish general election

Parties	Vote		
Parties	Votes	%	+ / -
Social Democrats	11,201	39.31	-1.70
Venstre	7,270	25.51	-0.67
Conservatives	4,859	17.05	-1.84
Green Left	2,396	8.41	+3.75
Social Liberals	1,275	4.47	+1.08
Independent Party	581	2.04	-0.40
Liberal Centre	501	1.76	New
Justice Party of Denmark	254	0.89	-0.92
Communist Party of Denmark	157	0.55	-0.32
Total	28,494		

1964 Danish general election

Parties	Vote		
Parties	Votes	%	+ / -
Social Democrats	10,662	41.01	+0.87
Venstre	6,806	26.18	-2.05
Conservatives	4,911	18.89	+1.42
Green Left	1,211	4.66	+0.10
Social Liberals	881	3.39	+0.17
Independent Party	635	2.44	-0.17
Justice Party of Denmark	470	1.81	-1.12
Communist Party of Denmark	226	0.87	+0.03
Peace Politics People's Party	104	0.40	New
Danish Unity	93	0.36	New
Total	25,999		

1960 Danish general election

Parties	Vote		
Parties	Votes	%	+ / -
Social Democrats	9,201	40.14	+3.60
Venstre	6,471	28.23	-1.50
Conservatives	4,005	17.47	+0.78
Green Left	1,046	4.56	New
Social Liberals	738	3.22	-1.37
Justice Party of Denmark	672	2.93	-4.86
Independent Party	599	2.61	-0.02
Communist Party of Denmark	192	0.84	-1.13
Total	22,924		

=== General elections in the 1950s ===
1957 Danish general election

Parties	Vote		
Parties	Votes	%	+ / -
Social Democrats	7,742	36.54	-3.55
Venstre	6,299	29.73	+3.96
Conservatives	3,537	16.69	-0.55
Justice Party of Denmark	1,650	7.79	+2.32
Social Liberals	973	4.59	-0.15
Independent Party	558	2.63	-1.10
Communist Party of Denmark	417	1.97	-0.99
Frede Jordan	12	0.06	New
Total	21,188		

September 1953 Danish Folketing election

Parties	Vote		
Parties	Votes	%	+ / -
Social Democrats	7,663	40.09	+0.85
Venstre	4,925	25.77	-0.06
Conservatives	3,296	17.24	-0.27
Justice Party of Denmark	1,046	5.47	-2.64
Social Liberals	906	4.74	-0.24
Independent Party	713	3.73	New
Communist Party of Denmark	565	2.96	-0.34
Total	19,114		

April 1953 Danish Folketing election

Parties	Vote		
Parties	Votes	%	+ / -
Social Democrats	7,304	39.24	+2.69
Venstre	4,808	25.83	-0.03
Conservatives	3,260	17.51	-0.94
Justice Party of Denmark	1,510	8.11	-4.38
Social Liberals	926	4.98	+1.34
Communist Party of Denmark	614	3.30	+0.29
Danish Unity	191	1.03	New
Total	18,613		

1950 Danish Folketing election

Parties	Vote		
Parties	Votes	%	+ / -
Social Democrats	6,823	36.55	+0.43
Venstre	4,827	25.86	-5.60
Conservatives	3,444	18.45	+5.39
Justice Party of Denmark	2,332	12.49	+2.90
Social Liberals	679	3.64	+0.20
Communist Party of Denmark	561	3.01	-1.67
Total	18,666		

=== General elections in the 1940s ===
1947 Danish Folketing election

Parties	Vote		
Parties	Votes	%	+ / -
Social Democrats	6,712	36.12	+5.15
Venstre	5,846	31.46	+2.16
Conservatives	2,426	13.06	-7.33
Justice Party of Denmark	1,782	9.59	+5.77
Communist Party of Denmark	869	4.68	-4.47
Social Liberals	640	3.44	-0.36
Danish Unity	305	1.64	-0.93
Total	18,580		

1945 Danish Folketing election

Parties	Vote		
Parties	Votes	%	+ / -
Social Democrats	5,537	30.97	-8.44
Venstre	5,238	29.30	+7.11
Conservatives	3,645	20.39	-7.94
Communist Party of Denmark	1,635	9.15	New
Justice Party of Denmark	683	3.82	+2.54
Social Liberals	679	3.80	-0.20
Danish Unity	460	2.57	+1.65
Total	17,877		

1943 Danish Folketing election

Parties	Vote		
Parties	Votes	%	+ / -
Social Democrats	7,136	39.41	+0.84
Conservatives	5,129	28.33	+6.44
Venstre	4,018	22.19	-0.88
Social Liberals	724	4.00	-0.09
Farmers' Party	435	2.40	-3.66
National Socialist Workers' Party of Denmark	267	1.47	-0.95
Justice Party of Denmark	231	1.28	-0.17
Danish Unity	166	0.92	+0.46
Total	18,106		

=== General elections in the 1930s ===
1939 Danish Folketing election

Parties	Vote		
Parties	Votes	%	+ / -
Social Democrats	5,117	38.57	-1.17
Venstre	3,061	23.07	-1.43
Conservatives	2,904	21.89	-1.22
Farmers' Party	804	6.06	+1.86
Social Liberals	542	4.09	-0.43
National Socialist Workers' Party of Denmark	321	2.42	+1.62
Communist Party of Denmark	219	1.65	+0.66
Justice Party of Denmark	192	1.45	-0.69
Danish Unity	61	0.46	New
National Cooperation	45	0.34	New
Total	13,266		

1935 Danish Folketing election

Parties	Vote		
Parties	Votes	%	+ / -
Social Democrats	5,282	39.74	+6.83
Venstre	3,256	24.50	-10.64
Conservatives	3,072	23.11	-1.57
Social Liberals	601	4.52	-0.26
Independent People's Party	558	4.20	New
Justice Party of Denmark	285	2.14	+0.41
Communist Party of Denmark	132	0.99	+0.62
National Socialist Workers' Party of Denmark	106	0.80	New
Total	13,292		

1932 Danish Folketing election

Parties	Vote		
Parties	Votes	%	+ / -
Venstre	4,326	35.14	-5.58
Social Democrats	4,052	32.91	+1.16
Conservatives	3,039	24.68	+3.79
Social Liberals	589	4.78	-0.75
Justice Party of Denmark	213	1.73	+0.88
Jens Frost	47	0.38	New
Communist Party of Denmark	46	0.37	+0.11
Total	12,312		

=== General elections in the 1920s ===
1929 Danish Folketing election

Parties	Vote		
Parties	Votes	%	+ / -
Venstre	4,663	40.72	+0.94
Social Democrats	3,636	31.75	+5.49
Conservatives	2,392	20.89	-5.93
Social Liberals	633	5.53	-0.88
Justice Party of Denmark	97	0.85	+0.40
Communist Party of Denmark	30	0.26	-0.03
Total	11,451		

1926 Danish Folketing election

Parties	Vote		
Parties	Votes	%	+ / -
Venstre	4,186	39.78	-2.98
Conservatives	2,822	26.82	+5.49
Social Democrats	2,763	26.26	+1.66
Social Liberals	675	6.41	-2.20
Justice Party of Denmark	47	0.45	+0.10
Communist Party of Denmark	30	0.29	+0.08
Total	10,523		

1924 Danish Folketing election

Parties	Vote		
Parties	Votes	%	+ / -
Venstre	4,344	42.76	-1.81
Social Democrats	2,499	24.60	+7.40
Conservatives	2,167	21.33	-8.41
Social Liberals	875	8.61	+0.71
Farmer Party	216	2.13	New
Justice Party of Denmark	36	0.35	New
Communist Party of Denmark	21	0.21	New
Total	10,158		

September 1920 Danish Folketing election

Parties	Vote		
Parties	Votes	%	+ / -
Venstre	4,224	44.57	-3.58
Conservatives	2,819	29.74	-0.52
Social Democrats	1,630	17.20	+3.43
Social Liberals	749	7.90	+0.82
Danish Left Socialist Party	56	0.59	New
Total	9,478		

July 1920 Danish Folketing election

Parties	Vote		
Parties	Votes	%	+ / -
Venstre	3,823	48.15	+3.21
Conservatives	2,403	30.26	-2.24
Social Democrats	1,093	13.77	-0.76
Social Liberals	562	7.08	-0.14
S. E. W. Schmidt	39	0.49	New
Industry Party	20	0.25	New
Total	7,940		

April 1920 Danish Folketing election

Parties	Vote	
Parties	Votes	%
Venstre	3,989	44.94
Conservatives	2,885	32.50
Social Democrats	1,290	14.53
Social Liberals	641	7.22
Jens Chr. Bæch	71	0.80
Total	8,876	

== European Parliament elections results ==
2024 European Parliament election in Denmark

Parties	Vote		
Parties	Votes	%	+ / -
Social Democrats	4,675	21.89	-7.00
Denmark Democrats	3,727	17.45	New
Venstre	3,546	16.60	-15.25
Green Left	2,308	10.80	+3.56
Danish People's Party	1,839	8.61	-5.50
Conservatives	1,342	6.28	+2.35
Liberal Alliance	1,271	5.95	+4.77
Moderates	1,219	5.71	New
Red–Green Alliance	680	3.18	+0.10
Social Liberals	521	2.44	-1.42
The Alternative	233	1.09	-0.18
Total	21,361		

2019 European Parliament election in Denmark

Parties	Vote		
Parties	Votes	%	+ / -
Venstre	8,727	31.85	+15.34
Social Democrats	7,916	28.89	+6.45
Danish People's Party	3,867	14.11	-21.01
Green Left	1,983	7.24	+0.51
People's Movement against the EU	1,262	4.61	-2.91
Conservatives	1,076	3.93	-2.91
Social Liberals	1,057	3.86	+1.37
Red–Green Alliance	843	3.08	New
The Alternative	349	1.27	New
Liberal Alliance	324	1.18	-1.18
Total	27,404		

2014 European Parliament election in Denmark

Parties	Vote		
Parties	Votes	%	+ / -
Danish People's Party	8,008	35.12	+17.87
Social Democrats	5,115	22.44	-1.21
Venstre	3,763	16.51	-5.17
People's Movement against the EU	1,715	7.52	+1.35
Conservatives	1,559	6.84	-5.77
Green Left	1,534	6.73	-5.78
Social Liberals	567	2.49	+0.16
Liberal Alliance	538	2.36	+1.95
Total	22,799		

2009 European Parliament election in Denmark

Parties	Vote		
Parties	Votes	%	+ / -
Social Democrats	5,569	23.65	-11.42
Venstre	5,103	21.68	+0.15
Danish People's Party	4,061	17.25	+8.50
Conservatives	2,968	12.61	+4.02
Green Left	2,946	12.51	+7.57
People's Movement against the EU	1,452	6.17	+1.93
June Movement	800	3.40	-9.16
Social Liberals	548	2.33	-0.52
Liberal Alliance	96	0.41	New
Total	23,543		

2004 European Parliament election in Denmark

Parties	Vote		
Parties	Votes	%	+ / -
Social Democrats	4,861	35.07	+18.10
Venstre	2,984	21.53	-2.62
June Movement	1,741	12.56	-7.77
Danish People's Party	1,213	8.75	+2.96
Conservatives	1,191	8.59	+1.47
Green Left	684	4.94	-0.05
People's Movement against the EU	588	4.24	-3.02
Social Liberals	395	2.85	-3.91
Christian Democrats	202	1.46	-1.40
Total	13,859		

1999 European Parliament election in Denmark

Parties	Vote		
Parties	Votes	%	+ / -
Venstre	3,497	24.15	+5.81
June Movement	2,943	20.33	+1.97
Social Democrats	2,457	16.97	-0.20
People's Movement against the EU	1,051	7.26	-4.50
Conservatives	1,031	7.12	-9.03
Social Liberals	979	6.76	-0.10
Danish People's Party	838	5.79	New
Green Left	723	4.99	-1.03
Centre Democrats	545	3.76	+2.73
Christian Democrats	414	2.86	+1.62
Progress Party	187	1.29	-1.77
Total	14,478		

1994 European Parliament election in Denmark

Parties	Vote		
Parties	Votes	%	+ / -
June Movement	3,010	18.36	New
Venstre	3,006	18.34	+3.82
Social Democrats	2,814	17.17	-11.41
Conservatives	2,647	16.15	+3.65
People's Movement against the EU	1,927	11.76	-4.65
Social Liberals	1,125	6.86	+5.14
Green Left	987	6.02	-1.06
Progress Party	502	3.06	-2.48
Christian Democrats	204	1.24	-3.09
Centre Democrats	168	1.03	-8.28
Total	16,390		

1989 European Parliament election in Denmark

Parties	Vote		
Parties	Votes	%	+ / -
Social Democrats	3,831	28.58	+6.91
People's Movement against the EU	2,200	16.41	-2.10
Venstre	1,946	14.52	+3.89
Conservatives	1,675	12.50	-8.84
Centre Democrats	1,248	9.31	+1.94
Green Left	949	7.08	-1.62
Progress Party	743	5.54	+0.74
Christian Democrats	581	4.33	+0.06
Social Liberals	230	1.72	-0.33
Total	13,403		

1984 European Parliament election in Denmark

Parties	Vote	
Parties	Votes	%
Social Democrats	3,305	21.67
Conservatives	3,255	21.34
People's Movement against the EU	2,823	18.51
Venstre	1,621	10.63
Green Left	1,327	8.70
Centre Democrats	1,124	7.37
Progress Party	733	4.80
Christian Democrats	652	4.27
Social Liberals	313	2.05
Left Socialists	102	0.67
Total	15,255	

== Referendums ==
2022 Danish European Union opt-out referendum

Option	Votes	%
✓ YES	17,159	58.36
X NO	12,245	41.64

2015 Danish European Union opt-out referendum

Option	Votes	%
X NO	20,674	62.54
✓ YES	12,384	37.46

2014 Danish Unified Patent Court membership referendum

Option	Votes	%
✓ YES	12,705	57.51
X NO	9,387	42.49

2009 Danish Act of Succession referendum

Option	Votes	%
✓ YES	19,243	85.24
X NO	3,332	14.76

2000 Danish euro referendum

Option	Votes	%
X NO	20,009	61.91
✓ YES	12,309	38.09

1998 Danish Amsterdam Treaty referendum

Option	Votes	%
X NO	13,601	51.42
✓ YES	12,850	48.58

1993 Danish Maastricht Treaty referendum

Option	Votes	%
✓ YES	16,339	50.23
X NO	16,190	49.77

1992 Danish Maastricht Treaty referendum

Option	Votes	%
X NO	16,822	55.57
✓ YES	13,448	44.43

1986 Danish Single European Act referendum

Option	Votes	%
✓ YES	15,289	57.46
X NO	11,317	42.54

1972 Danish European Communities membership referendum

Option	Votes	%
✓ YES	16,584	58.56
X NO	11,735	41.44

1953 Danish constitutional and electoral age referendum

Option	Votes	%
✓ YES	8,207	72.04
X NO	3,185	27.96
23 years	7,226	62.33
21 years	4,367	37.67

1939 Danish constitutional referendum

Option	Votes	%
✓ YES	5,448	92.07
X NO	469	7.93
