= Valby (nomination district) =

- Valby
- Nomination district constituency for the Folketing
- Location of Valby within Copenhagen

- Location of Copenhagen within Denmark
- Municipalities: Copenhagen
- Constituency: Copenhagen
- Electorate: 42,583 (2022)

Current constituency
- Created: 1895 (as constituency); 1915 (as nomination district)

Valby nominating district is one of the 92 nominating districts that was created for Danish elections following the 2007 municipal reform. It is one of the 9 nominating districts in Copenhagen Municipality. It was created in 1895. In 1915 its boundaries were changed, and it became a nomination district. In 1953 it was divided into Valby-vest and Valby-øst. Valby-vest was renamed Valby from 1970 onwards, and this nomination district was expanded in area in 2007.

In general elections, the district is a very strong area for parties commonly associated with the red bloc.

== General elections results ==
=== General elections in the 2020s ===
2022 Danish general election

Parties	Vote		
Parties	Votes	%	+ / -
Social Democrats	7,107	20.84	+0.84
Green Left	4,244	12.45	+0.21
Red–Green Alliance	4,121	12.09	-3.46
Moderates	3,093	9.07	New
Venstre	2,984	8.75	-5.66
Liberal Alliance	2,931	8.60	+6.00
The Alternative	2,677	7.85	+2.03
Social Liberals	2,409	7.06	-8.14
Conservatives	1,575	4.62	+0.48
Independent Greens	897	2.63	New
Denmark Democrats	706	2.07	New
New Right	643	1.89	+0.31
Danish People's Party	581	1.70	-3.15
Christian Democrats	65	0.19	-0.67
Flemming Blicher	55	0.16	New
Tom Gillesberg	10	0.03	0.00
Total	34,098		

=== General elections in the 2010s ===
2019 Danish general election

Parties	Vote		
Parties	Votes	%	+ / -
Social Democrats	6,491	20.00	-5.31
Red–Green Alliance	5,048	15.55	-0.27
Social Liberals	4,932	15.20	+7.21
Venstre	4,676	14.41	+4.58
Green Left	3,971	12.24	+5.32
The Alternative	1,889	5.82	-3.08
Danish People's Party	1,573	4.85	-9.08
Conservatives	1,342	4.14	+1.52
Liberal Alliance	843	2.60	-5.31
Stram Kurs	519	1.60	New
New Right	512	1.58	New
Klaus Riskær Pedersen Party	329	1.01	New
Christian Democrats	280	0.86	+0.39
Pierre Tavares	29	0.09	New
Tom Gillesberg	9	0.03	0.00
John Jørgensen	6	0.02	New
Tommy Schou Christesen	3	0.01	New
John Erik Wagner	1	0.00	-0.01
Total	32,453		

2015 Danish general election

Parties	Vote		
Parties	Votes	%	+ / -
Social Democrats	7,432	25.31	+2.19
Red–Green Alliance	4,646	15.82	+1.09
Danish People's Party	4,091	13.93	+3.62
Venstre	2,886	9.83	-5.26
The Alternative	2,612	8.90	New
Social Liberals	2,346	7.99	-5.97
Liberal Alliance	2,323	7.91	+2.97
Green Left	2,031	6.92	-6.11
Conservatives	769	2.62	-1.83
Christian Democrats	139	0.47	+0.17
Kashif Ahmad	74	0.25	New
Tom Gillesberg	10	0.03	0.00
John Erik Wagner	3	0.01	+0.01
Jan Elkjær	2	0.01	New
Total	29,364		

2011 Danish general election

Parties	Vote		
Parties	Votes	%	+ / -
Social Democrats	6,645	23.12	-4.11
Venstre	4,338	15.09	+2.02
Red–Green Alliance	4,235	14.73	+9.19
Social Liberals	4,012	13.96	+6.84
Green Left	3,744	13.03	-8.33
Danish People's Party	2,964	10.31	-2.81
Liberal Alliance	1,419	4.94	+1.32
Conservatives	1,278	4.45	-4.01
Christian Democrats	85	0.30	-0.14
Tom Gillesberg	9	0.03	+0.03
Klaus Trier Tuxen	8	0.03	New
Mads Vestergaard	5	0.02	New
Per Zimmermann	1	0.00	New
Morten Versner	0	0.00	New
John Erik Wagner	0	0.00	-0.01
Total	28,743		

=== General elections in the 2000s ===
2007 Danish general election

Parties	Vote		
Parties	Votes	%	+ / -
Social Democrats	7,437	27.23	-0.93
Green Left	5,832	21.36	+11.30
Danish People's Party	3,582	13.12	-1.37
Venstre	3,568	13.07	-2.62
Conservatives	2,311	8.46	+0.52
Social Liberals	1,945	7.12	-6.96
Red–Green Alliance	1,514	5.54	-1.67
New Alliance	988	3.62	New
Christian Democrats	119	0.44	-0.45
Nicolai Krogh Mittet	4	0.01	New
Vibeke Baden Laursen	3	0.01	New
John Erik Wagner	3	0.01	New
Amir Becirovic	1	0.00	New
Tom Gillesberg	0	0.00	New
Total	27,307		

2005 Danish general election

Parties	Vote		
Parties	Votes	%	+ / -
Social Democrats	5,747	28.16	-4.88
Venstre	3,201	15.69	-2.97
Danish People's Party	2,957	14.49	+0.46
Social Liberals	2,874	14.08	+7.61
Green Left	2,054	10.06	-1.54
Conservatives	1,620	7.94	+1.02
Red–Green Alliance	1,472	7.21	+1.90
Centre Democrats	222	1.09	-0.86
Christian Democrats	182	0.89	-0.73
Minority Party	79	0.39	New
Total	20,408		

2001 Danish general election

Parties	Vote		
Parties	Votes	%	+ / -
Social Democrats	7,034	33.04	-9.66
Venstre	3,972	18.66	+5.50
Danish People's Party	2,986	14.03	+4.43
Green Left	2,470	11.60	+0.32
Conservatives	1,474	6.92	+0.19
Social Liberals	1,378	6.47	+2.49
Red–Green Alliance	1,130	5.31	-0.67
Centre Democrats	415	1.95	-1.60
Christian People's Party	345	1.62	+0.39
Progress Party	86	0.40	-1.06
Total	21,290		

=== General elections in the 1990s ===
1998 Danish general election

Parties	Vote		
Parties	Votes	%	+ / -
Social Democrats	9,119	42.70	+0.88
Venstre	2,811	13.16	+1.79
Green Left	2,409	11.28	-0.93
Danish People's Party	2,050	9.60	New
Conservatives	1,437	6.73	-5.90
Red–Green Alliance	1,278	5.98	-1.45
Social Liberals	849	3.98	-0.24
Centre Democrats	758	3.55	+1.10
Progress Party	312	1.46	-5.13
Christian People's Party	263	1.23	+0.13
Democratic Renewal	71	0.33	New
Total	21,357		

1994 Danish general election

Parties	Vote		
Parties	Votes	%	+ / -
Social Democrats	8,629	41.82	-7.61
Conservatives	2,606	12.63	+1.25
Green Left	2,520	12.21	-0.94
Venstre	2,347	11.37	+5.64
Red–Green Alliance	1,533	7.43	+3.87
Progress Party	1,359	6.59	+2.81
Social Liberals	871	4.22	+1.64
Centre Democrats	506	2.45	-1.31
Christian People's Party	226	1.10	-0.08
Ebba Bigler	36	0.17	New
Total	20,633		

1990 Danish general election

Parties	Vote		
Parties	Votes	%	+ / -
Social Democrats	10,465	49.43	+10.95
Green Left	2,783	13.15	-8.36
Conservatives	2,409	11.38	-3.31
Venstre	1,213	5.73	+2.87
Common Course	808	3.82	+0.49
Progress Party	800	3.78	-2.41
Centre Democrats	795	3.76	+0.91
Red–Green Alliance	754	3.56	New
Social Liberals	547	2.58	-1.90
Christian People's Party	249	1.18	+0.01
The Greens	195	0.92	-0.57
Justice Party of Denmark	136	0.64	New
Humanist Party	17	0.08	New
Total	21,171		

=== General elections in the 1980s ===
1988 Danish general election

Parties	Vote		
Parties	Votes	%	+ / -
Social Democrats	8,680	38.48	+1.75
Green Left	4,851	21.51	-3.41
Conservatives	3,313	14.69	-0.08
Progress Party	1,397	6.19	+2.89
Social Liberals	1,011	4.48	-0.18
Common Course	750	3.33	-0.05
Venstre	646	2.86	+1.82
Centre Democrats	643	2.85	-0.21
Communist Party of Denmark	394	1.75	-0.05
The Greens	337	1.49	+0.14
Left Socialists	270	1.20	-1.53
Christian People's Party	264	1.17	-0.13
Total	22,556		

1987 Danish general election

Parties	Vote		
Parties	Votes	%	+ / -
Social Democrats	8,335	36.73	-7.49
Green Left	5,656	24.92	+6.81
Conservatives	3,351	14.77	-2.29
Social Liberals	1,058	4.66	+0.82
Common Course	767	3.38	New
Progress Party	749	3.30	+0.95
Centre Democrats	694	3.06	+0.40
Left Socialists	619	2.73	-1.80
Communist Party of Denmark	408	1.80	+0.31
The Greens	306	1.35	New
Christian People's Party	296	1.30	-0.08
Venstre	235	1.04	-1.27
Justice Party of Denmark	137	0.60	-1.36
Humanist Party	49	0.22	New
Socialist Workers Party	20	0.09	+0.02
Marxist–Leninists Party	15	0.07	+0.03
Total	22,695		

1984 Danish general election

Parties	Vote		
Parties	Votes	%	+ / -
Social Democrats	10,893	44.22	+0.08
Green Left	4,461	18.11	-1.06
Conservatives	4,203	17.06	+6.40
Left Socialists	1,115	4.53	+0.33
Social Liberals	945	3.84	-0.19
Centre Democrats	655	2.66	-2.36
Progress Party	578	2.35	-3.35
Venstre	570	2.31	+0.66
Justice Party of Denmark	483	1.96	+0.27
Communist Party of Denmark	366	1.49	-0.82
Christian People's Party	340	1.38	+0.27
Socialist Workers Party	17	0.07	-0.04
Marxist–Leninists Party	10	0.04	New
Total	24,636		

1981 Danish general election

Parties	Vote		
Parties	Votes	%	+ / -
Social Democrats	10,257	44.14	-8.64
Green Left	4,454	19.17	+10.03
Conservatives	2,477	10.66	+1.99
Progress Party	1,325	5.70	-0.71
Centre Democrats	1,166	5.02	+3.30
Left Socialists	977	4.20	-1.69
Social Liberals	937	4.03	-0.43
Communist Party of Denmark	536	2.31	-1.09
Justice Party of Denmark	392	1.69	-1.41
Venstre	383	1.65	-0.82
Christian People's Party	258	1.11	-0.25
Communist Workers Party	48	0.21	-0.36
Socialist Workers Party	25	0.11	New
Total	23,235		

=== General elections in the 1970s ===
1979 Danish general election

Parties	Vote		
Parties	Votes	%	+ / -
Social Democrats	12,672	52.78	-0.02
Green Left	2,194	9.14	+3.05
Conservatives	2,081	8.67	+2.37
Progress Party	1,540	6.41	-2.46
Left Socialists	1,413	5.89	+2.35
Social Liberals	1,071	4.46	+2.36
Communist Party of Denmark	816	3.40	-3.65
Justice Party of Denmark	745	3.10	-1.06
Venstre	592	2.47	+0.31
Centre Democrats	413	1.72	-2.44
Christian People's Party	327	1.36	-0.04
Communist Workers Party	138	0.57	New
Thorkild Weiss Madsen	6	0.02	New
Total	24,008		

1977 Danish general election

Parties	Vote		
Parties	Votes	%	+ / -
Social Democrats	13,273	52.80	+9.32
Progress Party	2,230	8.87	-0.87
Communist Party of Denmark	1,772	7.05	-1.50
Conservatives	1,584	6.30	+1.65
Green Left	1,532	6.09	-3.21
Justice Party of Denmark	1,046	4.16	+2.53
Justice Party of Denmark	1,046	4.16	+2.53
Left Socialists	891	3.54	+0.91
Venstre	542	2.16	-7.48
Social Liberals	527	2.10	-3.73
Christian People's Party	351	1.40	-1.79
Pensioners' Party	337	1.34	New
Niels Kjær-Larsen	8	0.03	New
Total	25,139		

1975 Danish general election

Parties	Vote		
Parties	Votes	%	+ / -
Social Democrats	11,229	43.48	+5.57
Progress Party	2,515	9.74	-0.77
Venstre	2,491	9.64	+7.28
Green Left	2,401	9.30	-2.63
Communist Party of Denmark	2,207	8.55	+1.11
Social Liberals	1,505	5.83	-1.98
Conservatives	1,202	4.65	-3.28
Christian People's Party	824	3.19	+1.16
Left Socialists	678	2.63	+0.73
Justice Party of Denmark	422	1.63	-1.10
Centre Democrats	347	1.34	-6.10
Otto Holtermann	6	0.02	New
Total	25,827		

1973 Danish general election

Parties	Vote		
Parties	Votes	%	+ / -
Social Democrats	10,112	37.91	-8.65
Green Left	3,183	11.93	-6.39
Progress Party	2,804	10.51	New
Conservatives	2,115	7.93	-6.19
Social Liberals	2,083	7.81	-3.09
Centre Democrats	1,985	7.44	New
Communist Party of Denmark	1,984	7.44	+4.69
Justice Party of Denmark	728	2.73	+1.01
Venstre	629	2.36	-0.12
Christian People's Party	541	2.03	+1.06
Left Socialists	507	1.90	-0.29
Bent Jespersen	3	0.01	New
Anne Vedelstierne	1	0.00	New
Total	26,675		

1971 Danish general election

Parties	Vote		
Parties	Votes	%	+ / -
Social Democrats	12,673	46.56	
Green Left	4,987	18.32	
Conservatives	3,843	14.12	
Social Liberals	2,966	10.90	
Communist Party of Denmark	748	2.75	
Venstre	675	2.48	
Left Socialists	595	2.19	
Justice Party of Denmark	467	1.72	
Christian People's Party	263	0.97	
Total	27,217		

=== General elections in the 1950s ===
April 1953 Danish Folketing election

Parties	Vote		
Parties	Votes	%	+ / -
Social Democrats	27,244	56.83	+1.44
Conservatives	7,696	16.05	-0.27
Communist Party of Denmark	5,191	10.83	-0.37
Social Liberals	3,412	7.12	+0.65
Justice Party of Denmark	2,414	5.04	-3.74
Venstre	1,610	3.36	+1.52
Danish Unity	373	0.78	New
Total	47,940		

1950 Danish Folketing election

Parties	Vote		
Parties	Votes	%	+ / -
Social Democrats	26,044	55.39	+0.43
Conservatives	7,676	16.32	+4.51
Communist Party of Denmark	5,265	11.20	-4.50
Justice Party of Denmark	4,129	8.78	+4.44
Social Liberals	3,041	6.47	+1.35
Venstre	867	1.84	-5.04
Total	47,022		

=== General elections in the 1940s ===
1947 Danish Folketing election

Parties	Vote		
Parties	Votes	%	+ / -
Social Democrats	26,334	54.96	+14.06
Communist Party of Denmark	7,524	15.70	-11.49
Conservatives	5,660	11.81	-7.59
Capital Venstre	3,295	6.88	+4.03
Social Liberals	2,454	5.12	-0.29
Justice Party of Denmark	2,081	4.34	+3.31
Danish Unity	567	1.18	-2.06
Total	47,915		

1945 Danish Folketing election

Parties	Vote		
Parties	Votes	%	+ / -
Social Democrats	19,346	40.90	-22.58
Communist Party of Denmark	12,861	27.19	New
Conservatives	9,175	19.40	-1.23
Social Liberals	2,558	5.41	-2.41
Danish Unity	1,531	3.24	-0.22
Venstre	1,347	2.85	+2.16
Justice Party of Denmark	486	1.03	-0.17
Total	47,304		

1943 Danish Folketing election

Parties	Vote		
Parties	Votes	%	+ / -
Social Democrats	28,408	63.48	-2.07
Conservatives	9,232	20.63	+4.62
Social Liberals	3,501	7.82	-1.08
Danish Unity	1,550	3.46	+2.99
National Socialist Workers' Party of Denmark	1,209	2.70	+1.07
Justice Party of Denmark	539	1.20	+0.18
Venstre	309	0.69	-0.14
Total	44,748		

=== General elections in the 1930s ===
1939 Danish Folketing election

Parties	Vote		
Parties	Votes	%	+ / -
Social Democrats	23,734	65.55	-3.46
Conservatives	5,797	16.01	-1.65
Social Liberals	3,224	8.90	+1.49
Communist Party of Denmark	1,688	4.66	+1.30
National Socialist Workers' Party of Denmark	590	1.63	+1.05
Justice Party of Denmark	371	1.02	-0.60
National Cooperation	333	0.92	New
Venstre	300	0.83	+0.48
Danish Unity	170	0.47	New
Total	36,207		

1935 Danish Folketing election

Parties	Vote		
Parties	Votes	%	+ / -
Social Democrats	24,379	69.01	-0.42
Conservatives	6,239	17.66	-0.11
Social Liberals	2,618	7.41	+0.59
Communist Party of Denmark	1,186	3.36	+0.65
Justice Party of Denmark	574	1.62	-0.37
National Socialist Workers' Party of Denmark	206	0.58	New
Venstre	125	0.35	-0.91
Total	35,327		

1932 Danish Folketing election

Parties	Vote		
Parties	Votes	%	+ / -
Social Democrats	20,056	69.43	-2.32
Conservatives	5,133	17.77	+1.21
Social Liberals	1,971	6.82	0.00
Communist Party of Denmark	784	2.71	+2.20
Justice Party of Denmark	576	1.99	+0.05
Venstre	364	1.26	-1.15
Curt C. Hansen	4	0.01	New
Total	28,888		

=== General elections in the 1920s ===
1929 Danish Folketing election

Parties	Vote		
Parties	Votes	%	+ / -
Social Democrats	16,722	71.75	+7.44
Conservatives	3,860	16.56	-6.03
Social Liberals	1,590	6.82	-2.02
Venstre	562	2.41	+0.66
Justice Party of Denmark	453	1.94	+0.60
Communist Party of Denmark	119	0.51	-0.65
Total	23,306		

1926 Danish Folketing election

Parties	Vote		
Parties	Votes	%	+ / -
Social Democrats	13,532	64.31	-1.14
Conservatives	4,754	22.59	+2.75
Social Liberals	1,861	8.84	-0.58
Venstre	368	1.75	-0.66
Justice Party of Denmark	282	1.34	+0.13
Communist Party of Denmark	244	1.16	+0.13
Total	21,041		

1924 Danish Folketing election

Parties	Vote		
Parties	Votes	%	+ / -
Social Democrats	13,075	65.45	+2.24
Conservatives	3,963	19.84	+1.33
Social Liberals	1,881	9.42	+2.60
Venstre	482	2.41	-1.58
Justice Party of Denmark	242	1.21	New
Communist Party of Denmark	206	1.03	New
Industry Party	129	0.65	-3.77
Total	19,978		

September 1920 Danish Folketing election

Parties	Vote		
Parties	Votes	%	+ / -
Social Democrats	10,577	63.21	+1.31
Conservatives	3,097	18.51	-1.54
Social Liberals	1,142	6.82	+0.33
Industry Party	740	4.42	-1.31
Venstre	667	3.99	-1.22
Free Social Democrats	383	2.29	New
Danish Left Socialist Party	127	0.76	New
Total	16,733		

July 1920 Danish Folketing election

Parties	Vote		
Parties	Votes	%	+ / -
Social Democrats	7,929	61.90	+5.07
Conservatives	2,568	20.05	-0.34
Social Liberals	831	6.49	-0.41
Industry Party	734	5.73	-0.76
Venstre	668	5.21	-0.15
J. L. Knudsen	46	0.36	New
Henrik Jarlbæk	29	0.23	-0.52
Jensine M. Nielsen-Barbro	5	0.04	New
Th. S. Damsgaard Schmidt	0	0.00	New
Total	12,810		

April 1920 Danish Folketing election

Parties	Vote	
Parties	Votes	%
Social Democrats	8,270	56.83
Conservatives	2,967	20.39
Social Liberals	1,004	6.90
Industry Party	944	6.49
Venstre	780	5.36
Free Social Democrats	266	1.83
Centrum	211	1.45
Henrik Jarlbæk	109	0.75
Total	14,551	

== European Parliament elections results ==
2024 European Parliament election in Denmark

Parties	Vote		
Parties	Votes	%	+ / -
Green Left	6,590	26.69	+4.58
Red–Green Alliance	3,967	16.07	+5.54
Social Liberals	2,818	11.41	-4.13
Social Democrats	2,710	10.98	-6.45
Conservatives	1,699	6.88	+1.91
Venstre	1,684	6.82	-4.09
Liberal Alliance	1,502	6.08	+4.22
The Alternative	1,324	5.36	-0.99
Moderates	1,098	4.45	New
Danish People's Party	942	3.82	-2.35
Denmark Democrats	353	1.43	New
Total	24,687		

2019 European Parliament election in Denmark

Parties	Vote		
Parties	Votes	%	+ / -
Green Left	5,709	22.11	+2.59
Social Democrats	4,501	17.43	-2.30
Social Liberals	4,012	15.54	+5.38
Venstre	2,817	10.91	+2.36
Red–Green Alliance	2,720	10.53	New
The Alternative	1,640	6.35	New
Danish People's Party	1,594	6.17	-13.43
Conservatives	1,283	4.97	-1.14
People's Movement against the EU	1,066	4.13	-9.02
Liberal Alliance	480	1.86	-1.32
Total	25,822		

2014 European Parliament election in Denmark

Parties	Vote		
Parties	Votes	%	+ / -
Social Democrats	3,739	19.73	-1.57
Danish People's Party	3,715	19.60	+6.82
Green Left	3,699	19.52	-5.15
People's Movement against the EU	2,493	13.15	+0.11
Social Liberals	1,925	10.16	+3.38
Venstre	1,621	8.55	-1.24
Conservatives	1,158	6.11	-1.85
Liberal Alliance	602	3.18	+2.45
Total	18,952		

2009 European Parliament election in Denmark

Parties	Vote		
Parties	Votes	%	+ / -
Green Left	4,522	24.67	+10.53
Social Democrats	3,905	21.30	-13.31
People's Movement against the EU	2,390	13.04	+3.08
Danish People's Party	2,343	12.78	+6.02
Venstre	1,795	9.79	+1.70
Conservatives	1,460	7.96	+0.75
Social Liberals	1,243	6.78	-1.10
June Movement	539	2.94	-7.83
Liberal Alliance	134	0.73	New
Total	18,331		

2004 European Parliament election in Denmark

Parties	Vote		
Parties	Votes	%	+ / -
Social Democrats	3,964	34.61	+17.62
Green Left	1,620	14.14	+2.37
June Movement	1,233	10.77	-9.96
People's Movement against the EU	1,141	9.96	-2.69
Venstre	926	8.09	-3.33
Social Liberals	903	7.88	-1.05
Conservatives	826	7.21	+1.51
Danish People's Party	774	6.76	-1.25
Christian Democrats	66	0.58	-0.56
Total	11,453		

1999 European Parliament election in Denmark

Parties	Vote		
Parties	Votes	%	+ / -
June Movement	2,580	20.73	-0.39
Social Democrats	2,114	16.99	-1.41
People's Movement against the EU	1,574	12.65	-5.28
Green Left	1,465	11.77	-0.32
Venstre	1,421	11.42	+4.16
Social Liberals	1,112	8.93	+1.79
Danish People's Party	997	8.01	New
Conservatives	709	5.70	-6.30
Centre Democrats	332	2.67	+1.89
Christian Democrats	142	1.14	+0.53
Progress Party	59	0.47	-2.21
Total	12,446		

1994 European Parliament election in Denmark

Parties	Vote		
Parties	Votes	%	+ / -
June Movement	2,788	21.12	New
Social Democrats	2,429	18.40	-10.00
People's Movement against the EU	2,367	17.93	-14.01
Green Left	1,596	12.09	-2.00
Conservatives	1,584	12.00	+3.27
Venstre	958	7.26	+2.04
Social Liberals	942	7.14	+5.43
Progress Party	354	2.68	-1.04
Centre Democrats	103	0.78	-4.27
Christian Democrats	80	0.61	-0.53
Total	13,201		

1989 European Parliament election in Denmark

Parties	Vote		
Parties	Votes	%	+ / -
People's Movement against the EU	4,220	31.94	+0.60
Social Democrats	3,752	28.40	+2.66
Green Left	1,862	14.09	-1.93
Conservatives	1,154	8.73	-3.90
Venstre	690	5.22	+3.28
Centre Democrats	667	5.05	+1.02
Progress Party	491	3.72	+0.83
Social Liberals	226	1.71	-0.15
Christian Democrats	150	1.14	-0.14
Total	13,212		

1984 European Parliament election in Denmark

Parties	Vote	
Parties	Votes	%
People's Movement against the EU	4,700	31.34
Social Democrats	3,861	25.74
Green Left	2,403	16.02
Conservatives	1,894	12.63
Centre Democrats	605	4.03
Progress Party	433	2.89
Left Socialists	341	2.27
Venstre	291	1.94
Social Liberals	279	1.86
Christian Democrats	192	1.28
Total	14,999	

== Referendums ==
2022 Danish European Union opt-out referendum

Option	Votes	%
✓ YES	16,844	67.83
X NO	7,987	32.17

2015 Danish European Union opt-out referendum

Option	Votes	%
X NO	12,830	54.18
✓ YES	10,852	45.82

2014 Danish Unified Patent Court membership referendum

Option	Votes	%
✓ YES	10,430	56.33
X NO	8,085	43.67

2009 Danish Act of Succession referendum

Option	Votes	%
✓ YES	12,991	83.59
X NO	2,551	16.41

2000 Danish euro referendum

Option	Votes	%
X NO	13,592	62.19
✓ YES	8,265	37.81

1998 Danish Amsterdam Treaty referendum

Option	Votes	%
X NO	10,887	57.40
✓ YES	8,081	42.60

1993 Danish Maastricht Treaty referendum

Option	Votes	%
X NO	12,956	59.44
✓ YES	8,839	40.56

1992 Danish Maastricht Treaty referendum

Option	Votes	%
X NO	14,128	65.96
✓ YES	7,292	34.04

1986 Danish Single European Act referendum

Option	Votes	%
X NO	13,806	67.75
✓ YES	6,573	32.25

1972 Danish European Communities membership referendum

Option	Votes	%
X NO	15,135	53.30
✓ YES	13,262	46.70

1953 Danish constitutional and electoral age referendum

Option	Votes	%
✓ YES	26,864	75.71
X NO	8,618	24.29
21 years	20,722	56.83
23 years	15,742	43.17

1939 Danish constitutional referendum

Option	Votes	%
✓ YES	31,652	97.14
X NO	933	2.86
