= Østerbro (nomination district) =

- Østerbro
- Nomination district constituency for the Folketing
- Location of Østerbro within Copenhagen

- Location of Copenhagen within Denmark
- Municipalities: Copenhagen
- Constituency: Copenhagen
- Electorate: 56,488 (2022)

Current constituency
- Created: 1915

Østerbro nominating district is one of the 92 nominating districts in Denmark. It was the latest update following the 2007 municipal reform. It is one of the 9 nominating districts in Copenhagen Municipality. It was created in 1915, though its boundaries have been changed since then.

In general elections, the district is a strong area for parties commonly associated with the red bloc.

== General elections results ==
=== General elections in the 2020s ===
2022 Danish general election

Parties	Vote		
Parties	Votes	%	+ / -
Social Democrats	8,414	17.35	+1.38
Red–Green Alliance	5,595	11.54	-2.66
Green Left	5,485	11.31	+0.10
Moderates	5,397	11.13	New
Liberal Alliance	5,002	10.31	+7.25
Venstre	4,751	9.80	-7.89
The Alternative	4,378	9.03	+2.87
Social Liberals	4,187	8.63	-9.63
Conservatives	2,749	5.67	-0.65
New Right	682	1.41	+0.08
Danish People's Party	585	1.21	-1.78
Denmark Democrats	558	1.15	New
Independent Greens	529	1.09	New
Christian Democrats	116	0.24	-0.58
Flemming Blicher	56	0.12	New
Tom Gillesberg	15	0.03	+0.02
Total	48,499		

=== General elections in the 2010s ===
2019 Danish general election

Parties	Vote		
Parties	Votes	%	+ / -
Social Liberals	8,756	18.26	+7.28
Venstre	8,483	17.69	+6.16
Social Democrats	7,660	15.97	-7.00
Red–Green Alliance	6,808	14.20	+0.28
Green Left	5,377	11.21	+4.90
Conservatives	3,029	6.32	+2.99
The Alternative	2,956	6.16	-4.91
Liberal Alliance	1,467	3.06	-7.99
Danish People's Party	1,432	2.99	-5.33
New Right	636	1.33	New
Stram Kurs	517	1.08	New
Christian Democrats	392	0.82	+0.42
Klaus Riskær Pedersen Party	391	0.82	New
Pierre Tavares	28	0.06	New
John Jørgensen	7	0.01	New
Tom Gillesberg	7	0.01	-0.02
Tommy Schou Christesen	3	0.01	New
John Erik Wagner	1	0.00	-0.01
Total	47,950		

2015 Danish general election

Parties	Vote		
Parties	Votes	%	+ / -
Social Democrats	10,634	22.97	+5.12
Red–Green Alliance	6,443	13.92	-0.85
Venstre	5,339	11.53	-5.21
The Alternative	5,124	11.07	New
Liberal Alliance	5,115	11.05	+3.97
Social Liberals	5,082	10.98	-8.47
Danish People's Party	3,850	8.32	+2.27
Green Left	2,921	6.31	-5.09
Conservatives	1,541	3.33	-2.97
Christian Democrats	185	0.40	+0.12
Kashif Ahmad	43	0.09	New
Tom Gillesberg	14	0.03	0.00
John Erik Wagner	3	0.01	+0.01
Jan Elkjær	0	0.00	New
Total	46,294		

2011 Danish general election

Parties	Vote		
Parties	Votes	%	+ / -
Social Liberals	8,882	19.45	+8.88
Social Democrats	8,153	17.85	-5.82
Venstre	7,645	16.74	+2.15
Red–Green Alliance	6,744	14.77	+8.71
Green Left	5,206	11.40	-8.74
Liberal Alliance	3,235	7.08	+2.17
Conservatives	2,876	6.30	-5.33
Danish People's Party	2,764	6.05	-1.83
Christian Democrats	130	0.28	-0.21
Klaus Trier Tuxen	16	0.04	New
Tom Gillesberg	14	0.03	0.00
Mads Vestergaard	3	0.01	New
John Erik Wagner	2	0.00	0.00
Per Zimmermann	2	0.00	New
Morten Versner	0	0.00	New
Total	45,672		

=== General elections in the 2000s ===
2007 Danish general election

Parties	Vote		
Parties	Votes	%	+ / -
Social Democrats	10,408	23.67	+4.76
Green Left	8,855	20.14	+11.43
Venstre	6,416	14.59	-5.13
Conservatives	5,114	11.63	-0.01
Social Liberals	4,645	10.57	-10.60
Danish People's Party	3,466	7.88	+0.23
Red–Green Alliance	2,666	6.06	-3.57
New Alliance	2,158	4.91	New
Christian Democrats	214	0.49	-0.65
Tom Gillesberg	15	0.03	New
Nicolai Krogh Mittet	2	0.00	New
John Erik Wagner	2	0.00	New
Vibeke Baden Laursen	1	0.00	New
Amir Becirovic	0	0.00	New
Total	43,962		

2005 Danish general election

Parties	Vote		
Parties	Votes	%	+ / -
Social Liberals	3,382	21.17	+7.41
Venstre	3,150	19.72	-5.29
Social Democrats	3,021	18.91	-3.92
Conservatives	1,859	11.64	+2.80
Red–Green Alliance	1,538	9.63	+3.54
Green Left	1,392	8.71	-2.39
Danish People's Party	1,222	7.65	+0.52
Christian Democrats	182	1.14	-0.87
Centre Democrats	175	1.10	-1.61
Minority Party	56	0.35	New
Feride Istogu Gillesberg	0	0.00	New
Total	15,977		

2001 Danish general election

Parties	Vote		
Parties	Votes	%	+ / -
Venstre	4,158	25.01	+7.01
Social Democrats	3,796	22.83	-6.06
Social Liberals	2,287	13.76	+5.54
Green Left	1,846	11.10	-1.70
Conservatives	1,470	8.84	-1.84
Danish People's Party	1,185	7.13	+1.68
Red–Green Alliance	1,013	6.09	-1.79
Centre Democrats	451	2.71	-2.32
Christian People's Party	334	2.01	+0.30
Progress Party	45	0.27	-0.65
Lars Hutters	39	0.23	New
Total	16,624		

=== General elections in the 1990s ===
1998 Danish general election

Parties	Vote		
Parties	Votes	%	+ / -
Social Democrats	4,759	28.89	+2.52
Venstre	2,965	18.00	+1.03
Green Left	2,108	12.80	-0.51
Conservatives	1,759	10.68	-7.65
Social Liberals	1,355	8.22	+0.57
Red–Green Alliance	1,298	7.88	-0.04
Danish People's Party	898	5.45	New
Centre Democrats	828	5.03	+1.93
Christian People's Party	281	1.71	+0.34
Progress Party	152	0.92	-3.24
Democratic Renewal	72	0.44	New
Total	16,475		

1994 Danish general election

Parties	Vote		
Parties	Votes	%	+ / -
Social Democrats	4,015	26.37	-4.05
Conservatives	2,790	18.33	+0.15
Venstre	2,584	16.97	+5.77
Green Left	2,027	13.31	-3.02
Red–Green Alliance	1,206	7.92	+2.91
Social Liberals	1,164	7.65	+2.52
Progress Party	633	4.16	+1.65
Centre Democrats	472	3.10	-0.91
Christian People's Party	209	1.37	-0.33
Jørgen Tved	64	0.42	New
Villo Sigurdsson	55	0.36	New
Birgitte Bjerring Sonneby	5	0.03	New
Total	15,224		

1990 Danish general election

Parties	Vote		
Parties	Votes	%	+ / -
Social Democrats	4,464	30.42	+8.55
Conservatives	2,668	18.18	-4.29
Green Left	2,396	16.33	-7.61
Venstre	1,643	11.20	+5.94
Social Liberals	753	5.13	-1.96
Red–Green Alliance	735	5.01	New
Centre Democrats	588	4.01	+0.67
Common Course	467	3.18	+0.90
Progress Party	369	2.51	-1.65
Christian People's Party	249	1.70	+0.47
The Greens	221	1.51	-1.25
Justice Party of Denmark	99	0.67	New
Humanist Party	13	0.09	New
Annette Dybdal	6	0.04	New
Abdul Wahid Pedersen	5	0.03	New
Total	14,676		

=== General elections in the 1980s ===
1988 Danish general election

Parties	Vote		
Parties	Votes	%	+ / -
Green Left	3,752	23.94	-0.95
Conservatives	3,522	22.47	+0.26
Social Democrats	3,428	21.87	+1.00
Social Liberals	1,111	7.09	-0.27
Progress Party	879	5.61	+3.10
Venstre	824	5.26	+1.96
Centre Democrats	523	3.34	-0.49
The Greens	432	2.76	0.00
Left Socialists	374	2.39	-2.90
Common Course	357	2.28	+0.03
Communist Party of Denmark	276	1.76	+0.07
Christian People's Party	193	1.23	-0.02
Total	15,671		

1987 Danish general election

Parties	Vote		
Parties	Votes	%	+ / -
Green Left	3,927	24.89	+4.83
Conservatives	3,505	22.21	-1.11
Social Democrats	3,293	20.87	-6.00
Social Liberals	1,162	7.36	+2.06
Left Socialists	835	5.29	+2.90
Centre Democrats	604	3.83	+0.42
Progress Party	535	3.39	-2.22
Venstre	521	3.30	-1.96
The Greens	435	2.76	New
Common Course	355	2.25	New
Communist Party of Denmark	267	1.69	+0.27
Christian People's Party	197	1.25	+0.02
Justice Party of Denmark	72	0.46	-1.18
Humanist Party	51	0.32	New
Socialist Workers Party	13	0.08	-0.03
Marxist–Leninists Party	7	0.04	+0.02
Total	15,779		

1984 Danish general election

Parties	Vote		
Parties	Votes	%	+ / -
Social Democrats	4,450	26.87	-2.43
Conservatives	3,863	23.32	+6.20
Green Left	3,323	20.06	+0.93
Left Socialists	1,546	9.33	+4.04
Social Liberals	878	5.30	+0.73
Venstre	747	4.51	+1.20
Centre Democrats	565	3.41	-1.97
Progress Party	387	2.34	-1.05
Christian People's Party	276	1.67	+0.38
Justice Party of Denmark	271	1.64	+0.16
Communist Party of Denmark	235	1.42	-0.61
Socialist Workers Party	18	0.11	-0.05
Marxist–Leninists Party	4	0.02	New
Total	16,563		

1981 Danish general election

Parties	Vote		
Parties	Votes	%	+ / -
Social Democrats	4,600	29.30	-8.56
Green Left	3,004	19.13	+9.95
Conservatives	2,688	17.12	+2.76
Left Socialists	1,481	9.43	+0.10
Progress Party	1,003	6.39	+4.05
Centre Democrats	844	5.38	+3.19
Social Liberals	718	4.57	-0.37
Venstre	520	3.31	-1.52
Communist Party of Denmark	318	2.03	-1.44
Justice Party of Denmark	232	1.48	-1.28
Christian People's Party	203	1.29	-0.07
Communist Workers Party	63	0.40	-0.85
Socialist Workers Party	25	0.16	New
Total	15,699		

=== General elections in the 1970s ===
1979 Danish general election

Parties	Vote		
Parties	Votes	%	+ / -
Social Democrats	6,135	37.86	-2.11
Conservatives	2,327	14.36	+3.28
Left Socialists	1,650	10.18	+3.13
Green Left	1,487	9.18	+2.91
Progress Party	1,228	7.58	+1.19
Social Liberals	800	4.94	+1.89
Venstre	782	4.83	+1.25
Communist Party of Denmark	562	3.47	-3.43
Justice Party of Denmark	447	2.76	-0.85
Centre Democrats	355	2.19	-2.86
Christian People's Party	221	1.36	-0.42
Communist Workers Party	202	1.25	New
Leni Thomsen	8	0.05	New
Total	16,204		

1977 Danish general election

Parties	Vote		
Parties	Votes	%	+ / -
Social Democrats	6,873	39.97	+8.53
Conservatives	1,905	11.08	+4.29
Progress Party	1,754	10.20	+2.62
Left Socialists	1,213	7.05	+1.34
Communist Party of Denmark	1,186	6.90	-1.86
Green Left	1,078	6.27	-1.88
Centre Democrats	868	5.05	+3.64
Justice Party of Denmark	620	3.61	+1.88
Venstre	615	3.58	-13.06
Social Liberals	524	3.05	-2.59
Christian People's Party	306	1.78	-1.49
Pensioners' Party	251	1.46	New
Karen T. Christensen	4	0.02	New
Total	17,197		

1975 Danish general election

Parties	Vote		
Parties	Votes	%	+ / -
Social Democrats	5,627	31.44	+3.03
Venstre	2,978	16.64	+11.38
Progress Party	1,866	10.43	-1.27
Communist Party of Denmark	1,567	8.76	+0.58
Green Left	1,459	8.15	-2.99
Conservatives	1,215	6.79	-6.21
Left Socialists	1,022	5.71	+2.65
Social Liberals	1,010	5.64	-2.99
Christian People's Party	586	3.27	+1.06
Justice Party of Denmark	310	1.73	-1.23
Centre Democrats	252	1.41	-4.01
Birgit Busk	3	0.02	New
Total	17,895		

1973 Danish general election

Parties	Vote		
Parties	Votes	%	+ / -
Social Democrats	5,250	28.41	-6.24
Conservatives	2,402	13.00	-10.06
Progress Party	2,162	11.70	New
Green Left	2,058	11.14	-5.59
Social Liberals	1,594	8.63	-3.34
Communist Party of Denmark	1,512	8.18	+6.02
Centre Democrats	1,001	5.42	New
Venstre	972	5.26	+0.32
Left Socialists	566	3.06	-0.93
Justice Party of Denmark	547	2.96	+1.43
Christian People's Party	409	2.21	+1.27
Gunnar Skou	5	0.03	New
Total	18,478		

1971 Danish general election

Parties	Vote		
Parties	Votes	%	+ / -
Social Democrats	6,559	34.65	-0.38
Conservatives	4,364	23.06	-4.85
Green Left	3,166	16.73	+6.37
Social Liberals	2,266	11.97	-2.55
Venstre	935	4.94	+1.03
Left Socialists	756	3.99	-0.09
Communist Party of Denmark	409	2.16	+0.35
Justice Party of Denmark	289	1.53	+1.10
Christian People's Party	178	0.94	New
Kaare Heistein Sørensen	6	0.03	New
Total	18,928		

=== General elections in the 1960s ===
1968 Danish general election

Parties	Vote		
Parties	Votes	%	+ / -
Social Democrats	6,850	35.03	-2.70
Conservatives	5,458	27.91	+3.28
Social Liberals	2,839	14.52	+8.97
Green Left	2,026	10.36	-10.75
Left Socialists	797	4.08	New
Venstre	764	3.91	-1.20
Communist Party of Denmark	354	1.81	+0.70
Liberal Centre	328	1.68	-1.69
Justice Party of Denmark	85	0.43	+0.04
Independent Party	53	0.27	-0.72
Kristine Heide	2	0.01	New
Total	19,556		

1966 Danish general election

Parties	Vote		
Parties	Votes	%	+ / -
Social Democrats	7,492	37.73	-7.57
Conservatives	4,890	24.63	-2.49
Green Left	4,192	21.11	+10.23
Social Liberals	1,101	5.55	+1.69
Venstre	1,015	5.11	-2.83
Liberal Centre	670	3.37	New
Communist Party of Denmark	221	1.11	-0.70
Independent Party	197	0.99	-0.86
Justice Party of Denmark	77	0.39	-0.22
Total	19,855		

1964 Danish general election

Parties	Vote		
Parties	Votes	%	+ / -
Social Democrats	8,831	45.30	-1.28
Conservatives	5,288	27.12	+0.53
Green Left	2,121	10.88	-0.23
Venstre	1,547	7.94	+1.72
Social Liberals	753	3.86	-0.06
Independent Party	360	1.85	-0.74
Communist Party of Denmark	352	1.81	+0.17
Justice Party of Denmark	118	0.61	-0.73
Danish Unity	77	0.39	New
Peace Politics People's Party	48	0.25	New
Total	19,495		

1960 Danish general election

Parties	Vote		
Parties	Votes	%	+ / -
Social Democrats	8,890	46.58	+1.97
Conservatives	5,074	26.59	-1.74
Green Left	2,121	11.11	New
Venstre	1,187	6.22	-3.08
Social Liberals	749	3.92	-2.78
Independent Party	495	2.59	+1.23
Communist Party of Denmark	313	1.64	-3.40
Justice Party of Denmark	256	1.34	-3.33
Total	19,085		

=== General elections in the 1950s ===
1957 Danish general election

Parties	Vote		
Parties	Votes	%	+ / -
Social Democrats	8,562	44.61	+0.07
Conservatives	5,438	28.33	-3.00
Venstre	1,784	9.30	+3.09
Social Liberals	1,285	6.70	+0.61
Communist Party of Denmark	967	5.04	-2.09
Justice Party of Denmark	896	4.67	+1.88
Independent Party	261	1.36	-0.55
Total	19,193		

September 1953 Danish Folketing election

Parties	Vote		
Parties	Votes	%	+ / -
Social Democrats	8,591	44.54	-0.05
Conservatives	6,042	31.33	+1.16
Communist Party of Denmark	1,376	7.13	-0.42
Venstre	1,198	6.21	+1.26
Social Liberals	1,174	6.09	-0.85
Justice Party of Denmark	538	2.79	-1.99
Independent Party	369	1.91	New
Total	19,288		

April 1953 Danish Folketing election

Parties	Vote		
Parties	Votes	%	+ / -
Social Democrats	8,473	44.59	+0.10
Conservatives	5,733	30.17	+1.07
Communist Party of Denmark	1,434	7.55	+0.05
Social Liberals	1,318	6.94	+0.43
Venstre	941	4.95	+1.80
Justice Party of Denmark	909	4.78	-4.47
Danish Unity	196	1.03	New
Total	19,004		

1950 Danish Folketing election

Parties	Vote		
Parties	Votes	%	+ / -
Social Democrats	8,524	44.49	+0.75
Conservatives	5,575	29.10	+8.12
Justice Party of Denmark	1,772	9.25	+4.64
Communist Party of Denmark	1,437	7.50	-3.24
Social Liberals	1,248	6.51	+0.53
Venstre	604	3.15	-9.24
Total	19,160		

=== General elections in the 1940s ===
1947 Danish Folketing election

Parties	Vote		
Parties	Votes	%	+ / -
Social Democrats	8,988	43.74	+10.34
Conservatives	4,312	20.98	-11.60
Capital Venstre	2,547	12.39	+7.92
Communist Party of Denmark	2,206	10.74	-8.21
Social Liberals	1,228	5.98	+0.74
Justice Party of Denmark	947	4.61	+3.47
Danish Unity	321	1.56	-2.65
Total	20,549		

1945 Danish Folketing election

Parties	Vote		
Parties	Votes	%	+ / -
Social Democrats	6,919	33.40	-15.39
Conservatives	6,749	32.58	-3.11
Communist Party of Denmark	3,926	18.95	New
Social Liberals	1,085	5.24	-1.41
Venstre	925	4.47	+3.41
Danish Unity	873	4.21	+0.43
Justice Party of Denmark	236	1.14	-0.14
Total	20,713		

1943 Danish Folketing election

Parties	Vote		
Parties	Votes	%	+ / -
Social Democrats	10,228	48.79	-4.83
Conservatives	7,482	35.69	+7.02
Social Liberals	1,394	6.65	-2.32
Danish Unity	792	3.78	+3.05
National Socialist Workers' Party of Denmark	575	2.74	+1.46
Justice Party of Denmark	269	1.28	+0.38
Venstre	223	1.06	+0.08
Total	20,963		

=== General elections in the 1930s ===
1939 Danish Folketing election

Parties	Vote		
Parties	Votes	%	+ / -
Social Democrats	9,793	53.62	-5.87
Conservatives	5,236	28.67	+1.84
Social Liberals	1,638	8.97	+1.15
Communist Party of Denmark	612	3.35	+0.52
National Cooperation	273	1.49	New
National Socialist Workers' Party of Denmark	234	1.28	+0.89
Venstre	179	0.98	+0.45
Justice Party of Denmark	165	0.90	-1.20
Danish Unity	134	0.73	New
Total	18,264		

1935 Danish Folketing election

Parties	Vote		
Parties	Votes	%	+ / -
Social Democrats	10,905	59.49	+2.61
Conservatives	4,919	26.83	-3.38
Social Liberals	1,433	7.82	+1.09
Communist Party of Denmark	519	2.83	+0.58
Justice Party of Denmark	385	2.10	-0.32
Venstre	98	0.53	-0.95
National Socialist Workers' Party of Denmark	72	0.39	New
Total	18,331		

1932 Danish Folketing election

Parties	Vote		
Parties	Votes	%	+ / -
Social Democrats	10,048	56.88	-1.08
Conservatives	5,337	30.21	+1.29
Social Liberals	1,189	6.73	-0.78
Justice Party of Denmark	427	2.42	+0.58
Communist Party of Denmark	398	2.25	+1.65
Venstre	262	1.48	-1.69
N. P. J. Andersen	4	0.02	New
Total	17,665		

=== General elections in the 1920s ===
1929 Danish Folketing election

Parties	Vote		
Parties	Votes	%	+ / -
Social Democrats	9,221	57.96	+5.79
Conservatives	4,601	28.92	-5.22
Social Liberals	1,194	7.51	-1.69
Venstre	504	3.17	+1.15
Justice Party of Denmark	293	1.84	+0.28
Communist Party of Denmark	96	0.60	-0.31
Total	15,909		

1926 Danish Folketing election

Parties	Vote		
Parties	Votes	%	+ / -
Social Democrats	8,214	52.17	-0.53
Conservatives	5,375	34.14	+2.62
Social Liberals	1,448	9.20	-1.16
Venstre	318	2.02	-0.30
Justice Party of Denmark	246	1.56	+0.15
Communist Party of Denmark	143	0.91	-0.15
Total	15,744		

1924 Danish Folketing election

Parties	Vote		
Parties	Votes	%	+ / -
Social Democrats	8,298	52.70	-6.22
Conservatives	4,963	31.52	+9.07
Social Liberals	1,632	10.36	+2.91
Venstre	366	2.32	-1.09
Justice Party of Denmark	222	1.41	New
Communist Party of Denmark	167	1.06	New
Industry Party	99	0.63	-4.39
Total	15,747		

September 1920 Danish Folketing election

Parties	Vote		
Parties	Votes	%	+ / -
Social Democrats	7,290	58.92	+8.91
Conservatives	2,778	22.45	-7.44
Social Liberals	922	7.45	-0.61
Industry Party	621	5.02	-0.33
Venstre	422	3.41	-1.96
Free Social Democrats	213	1.72	New
Danish Left Socialist Party	127	1.03	New
Total	12,373		

July 1920 Danish Folketing election

Parties	Vote		
Parties	Votes	%	+ / -
Social Democrats	5,722	50.01	+5.09
Conservatives	3,420	29.89	+0.92
Social Liberals	922	8.06	-0.43
Venstre	615	5.37	-0.42
Industry Party	612	5.35	-0.93
Ernst Christiansen	95	0.83	-0.10
H. N. Krogsager	47	0.41	New
Karl Jensen	6	0.05	New
A. B. Storgaard-Nielsen	3	0.03	New
Total	11,442		

April 1920 Danish Folketing election

Parties	Vote	
Parties	Votes	%
Social Democrats	6,125	44.92
Conservatives	3,950	28.97
Social Liberals	1,158	8.49
Industry Party	857	6.28
Venstre	789	5.79
Centrum	375	2.75
Free Social Democrats	255	1.87
Ernst Christiansen	127	0.93
Total	13,636	

== European Parliament elections results ==
2024 European Parliament election in Denmark

Parties	Vote		
Parties	Votes	%	+ / -
Green Left	10,011	25.91	+3.23
Red–Green Alliance	5,168	13.38	+4.77
Social Liberals	5,028	13.01	-5.50
Social Democrats	3,921	10.15	-3.79
Venstre	3,273	8.47	-5.00
Conservatives	3,035	7.85	+1.15
Liberal Alliance	2,762	7.15	+4.77
Moderates	2,083	5.39	New
The Alternative	1,852	4.79	-1.85
Danish People's Party	1,122	2.90	-1.29
Denmark Democrats	384	0.99	New
Total	38,639		

2019 European Parliament election in Denmark

Parties	Vote		
Parties	Votes	%	+ / -
Green Left	9,033	22.68	+2.56
Social Liberals	7,370	18.51	+3.70
Social Democrats	5,552	13.94	-5.14
Venstre	5,363	13.47	+2.89
Red–Green Alliance	3,429	8.61	New
Conservatives	2,669	6.70	-0.61
The Alternative	2,643	6.64	New
Danish People's Party	1,668	4.19	-8.97
People's Movement against the EU	1,146	2.88	-8.08
Liberal Alliance	948	2.38	-1.59
Total	39,821		

2014 European Parliament election in Denmark

Parties	Vote		
Parties	Votes	%	+ / -
Green Left	6,352	20.12	-5.53
Social Democrats	6,024	19.08	+0.06
Social Liberals	4,677	14.81	+4.87
Danish People's Party	4,156	13.16	+4.47
People's Movement against the EU	3,461	10.96	+0.22
Venstre	3,340	10.58	-2.05
Conservatives	2,307	7.31	-2.13
Liberal Alliance	1,253	3.97	+2.87
Total	31,570		

2009 European Parliament election in Denmark

Parties	Vote		
Parties	Votes	%	+ / -
Green Left	7,946	25.65	+11.20
Social Democrats	5,891	19.02	-7.76
Venstre	3,912	12.63	+0.80
People's Movement against the EU	3,327	10.74	+2.99
Social Liberals	3,079	9.94	-5.07
Conservatives	2,923	9.44	-1.56
Danish People's Party	2,691	8.69	+4.46
June Movement	866	2.80	-5.29
Liberal Alliance	340	1.10	New
Total	30,975		

2004 European Parliament election in Denmark

Parties	Vote		
Parties	Votes	%	+ / -
Social Democrats	2,737	26.78	+15.85
Social Liberals	1,534	15.01	-1.15
Green Left	1,477	14.45	+3.42
Venstre	1,209	11.83	-6.56
Conservatives	1,124	11.00	+2.58
June Movement	827	8.09	-7.88
People's Movement against the EU	792	7.75	-2.54
Danish People's Party	432	4.23	+0.05
Christian Democrats	87	0.85	-0.23
Total	10,219		

1999 European Parliament election in Denmark

Parties	Vote		
Parties	Votes	%	+ / -
Venstre	1,979	18.39	+5.78
Social Liberals	1,740	16.16	+6.15
June Movement	1,719	15.97	-2.51
Green Left	1,187	11.03	-1.05
Social Democrats	1,176	10.93	+1.27
People's Movement against the EU	1,108	10.29	-4.25
Conservatives	906	8.42	-10.48
Danish People's Party	450	4.18	New
Centre Democrats	383	3.56	+2.38
Christian Democrats	116	1.08	+0.23
Progress Party	25	0.23	-1.46
Total	10,764		

1994 European Parliament election in Denmark

Parties	Vote		
Parties	Votes	%	+ / -
Conservatives	2,019	18.90	+4.35
June Movement	1,974	18.48	New
People's Movement against the EU	1,553	14.54	-14.66
Venstre	1,347	12.61	+3.64
Green Left	1,291	12.08	-2.51
Social Liberals	1,070	10.01	+6.69
Social Democrats	1,032	9.66	-6.70
Progress Party	181	1.69	-1.37
Centre Democrats	126	1.18	-7.17
Christian Democrats	91	0.85	-0.74
Total	10,684		

1989 European Parliament election in Denmark

Parties	Vote		
Parties	Votes	%	+ / -
People's Movement against the EU	2,765	29.20	-1.07
Social Democrats	1,549	16.36	+1.11
Green Left	1,382	14.59	+1.64
Conservatives	1,378	14.55	-7.98
Venstre	849	8.97	+5.99
Centre Democrats	791	8.35	+3.31
Social Liberals	314	3.32	+1.11
Progress Party	290	3.06	+0.30
Christian Democrats	151	1.59	-0.23
Total	9,469		

1984 European Parliament election in Denmark

Parties	Vote	
Parties	Votes	%
People's Movement against the EU	3,143	30.27
Conservatives	2,340	22.53
Social Democrats	1,584	15.25
Green Left	1,345	12.95
Centre Democrats	523	5.04
Left Socialists	435	4.19
Venstre	309	2.98
Progress Party	287	2.76
Social Liberals	229	2.21
Christian Democrats	189	1.82
Total	10,384	

== Referendums ==
2022 Danish European Union opt-out referendum

Option	Votes	%
✓ YES	27,096	74.11
X NO	9,467	25.89

2015 Danish European Union opt-out referendum

Option	Votes	%
✓ YES	21,103	56.43
X NO	16,294	43.57

2014 Danish Unified Patent Court membership referendum

Option	Votes	%
✓ YES	19,559	63.87
X NO	11,064	36.13

2009 Danish Act of Succession referendum

Option	Votes	%
✓ YES	21,155	84.74
X NO	3,810	15.26

2000 Danish euro referendum

Option	Votes	%
✓ YES	8,975	54.13
X NO	7,605	45.87

1998 Danish Amsterdam Treaty referendum

Option	Votes	%
✓ YES	8,426	57.17
X NO	6,313	42.83

1993 Danish Maastricht Treaty referendum

Option	Votes	%
✓ YES	8,188	51.26
X NO	7,785	48.74

1992 Danish Maastricht Treaty referendum

Option	Votes	%
X NO	8,577	55.24
✓ YES	6,950	44.76

1986 Danish Single European Act referendum

Option	Votes	%
X NO	7,960	57.08
✓ YES	5,986	42.92

1972 Danish European Communities membership referendum

Option	Votes	%
✓ YES	10,405	51.81
X NO	9,677	48.19

1953 Danish constitutional and electoral age referendum

Option	Votes	%
✓ YES	9,682	69.98
X NO	4,154	30.02
23 years	7,537	53.85
21 years	6,460	46.15

1939 Danish constitutional referendum

Option	Votes	%
✓ YES	14,366	94.85
X NO	780	5.15
