= Schleswig Party =

Schleswig Party Slesvigsk Parti
- German name: Schleswigsche Partei
- Chairperson: Rainer Naaujeck
- Founded: 1920
- Headquarters: Vestergade 30; 6200 Aabenraa
- Ideology: Regionalism; German minority interests
- Political position: Centre
- European affiliation: European Free Alliance
- Colours: Yellow
- Folketing: 0 / 179
- European Parliament: 0 / 15
- Regions: 0 / 205
- Municipal councils: 10 / 2,436
- Mayors: 1 / 98

Election symbol
- S

Website
- slesvigsk-parti.dk

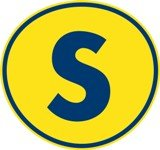

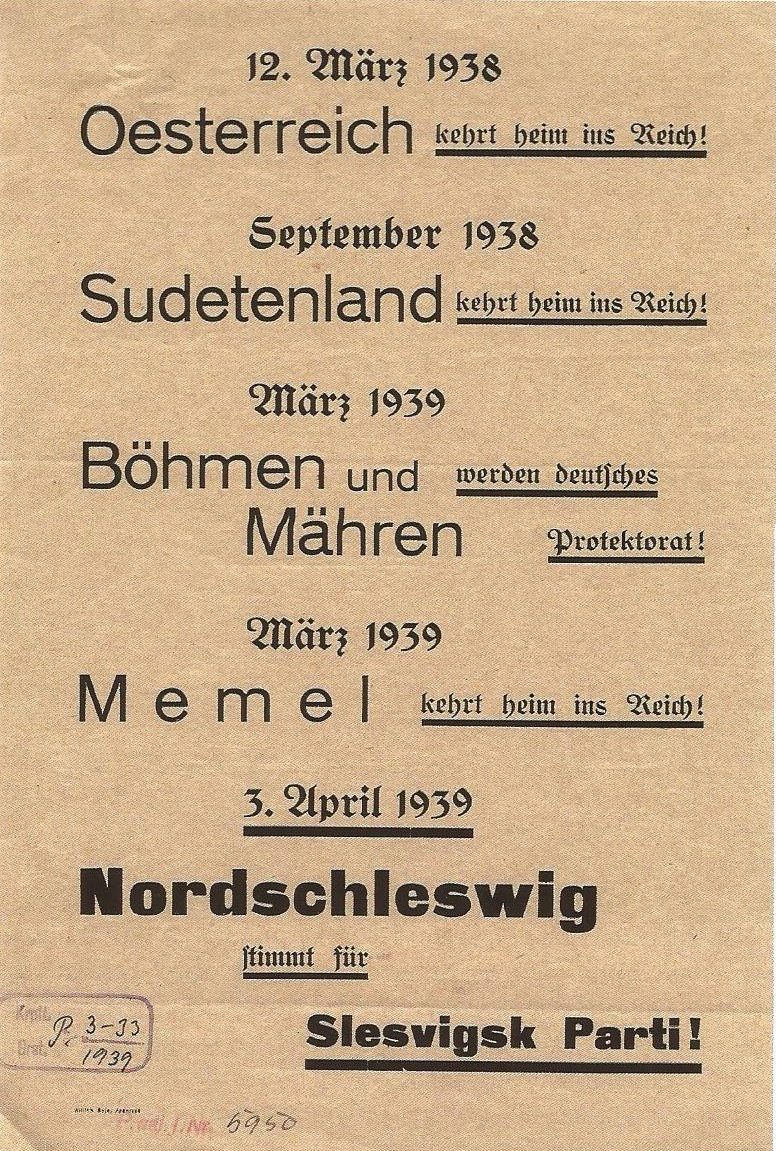
Schleswig Party election poster in 1939

The Schleswig Party (Danish: Slesvigsk Parti, German: Schleswigsche Partei) is a regional political party in Denmark representing Schleswig (Sønderjylland).

Flag of the Germans of Northern Schleswig, Denmark.

== History ==
The party was established in August 1920 as the Schleswig Voters Club (German: Schleswigscher Wählerverein) following the Schleswig Plebiscites and the ceding of Northern Schleswig from Germany to Denmark. It ran in the September 1920 Folketing elections, winning a single seat taken by Johannes Schmidt-Wodder. The party maintained its single seat in elections in 1924, 1926, 1929, 1932, 1935 and 1939.

The party did not run in the 1943 or 1945 elections, but returned to contest the 1947 elections, in which it failed to win a seat. The party remained seatless until the September 1953 elections, retaining its seat in 1957 and 1960. The 1964 elections saw the party lose its single seat, and it did not contest the 1966 elections.

The party returned to run in the 1968 elections, but failed to win a seat. After failing to win a seat in the 1971 elections, the party has not contested any further national elections, although it continues to participate in local politics in North Schleswig.

Between 1973 and 1979 the party was represented in Parliament by Jes Schmidt, a candidate elected through an electoral agreement with the Centre Democrats. After his death in 1979, the agreement between the two parties stopped because the SP proposed a candidate with a Waffen-SS past, thus unacceptable for the CD.

== Leaders ==
- Johannes Schmidt-Wodder (1920–35)
- Hans Christian Jepsen (1983–91)
- Peter Bieling (1991–99)
- Gerhard Mammen (1999–2010)
- Marit Jessen Rüdiger (2010–12)
- Carsten Leth Schmidt (2012–2022)
- Rainer Naujeck (2022–)

== Election results ==
=== Folketing ===
Election	Votes	%	+/–	Seats	+/–
1920 (Sep)	7,505	0.6%	New	1 / 149	New
1924	7,715	0.6%	0.0	1 / 149	0
1926	10,422	0.8%	+0.2	1 / 149	0
1929	9,787	0.7%	–0.1	1 / 149	0
1932	9,868	0.6%	–0.1	1 / 149	0
1935	12,617	0.8%	+0.2	1 / 149	0
1939	15,016	0.9%	+0.1	1 / 149	0
1943–1945	Did not run				
1947	7,464	0.4%	+0.4	0 / 150	0
1950	6,406	0.3%	–0.1	0 / 151	0
1953 (Apr)	8,438	0.4%	+0.1	0 / 151	0
1953 (Sep)	9,721	0.5%	+0.1	1 / 179	▲1
1957	9,202	0.4%	–0.1	1 / 179	0
1960	9,058	0.4%	0.0	1 / 179	0
1964	9,274	0.4%	0.0	0 / 179	▼1
1966	Did not run				
1968	6,831	0.2%	+0.2	0 / 179	0
1971	6,743	0.2%	0.0	0 / 179	0
1973–	Did not run				

=== Landsting ===
Election	Votes	Seats
1928	6,736	0 / 76
1932	Did not run	
1936	8,868	0 / 76
1939	11,122	0 / 76
1943–1953	Did not run	

=== Local elections ===
Municipal elections

Election	Seats	+/–
1922	56 / 10,750	
1925	64 / 11,329	▲8
1929	70 / 11,403	▲6
1933	72 / 11,425	▲2
1937	88 / 11,371	▲16
1943		
1946		
1950	45 / 11,499	
1954	52 / 11,505	▲7
1958	50 / 11,529	▼2
1962	44 / 11,414	▼6
1966	42 / 10,005	▼2
1970	20 / 4,677	▼22
1974	16 / 4,735	▼4
1978	14 / 4,759	▼2
1981	12 / 4,769	▼2
1985	14 / 4,773	▲2
1989	9 / 4,737	▼5
1993	9 / 4,703	0
1997	8 / 4,647	▼1
2001	7 / 4,685	▼1
2005	4 / 2,522	▼3
2009	6 / 2,468	▲2
2013	9 / 2,444	▲3
2017	10 / 2,432	▲1
2021	10 / 2,436	0

Regional elections

Election	Votes	Seats	+/–
1935	4,737	6 / 299	
1943		6 / 299	0
1946		1 / 299	▼5
1950	3,123	2 / 299	▲1
1954	3,912	3 / 299	▲1
1958	4,069	3 / 303	0
1962	3,860	2 / 301	▼1
1966	3,837	3 / 303	▲1
1970	7,501	1 / 366	▼2
1974	6,454	2 / 370	▲1
1978	6,508	1 / 370	▼1
1981	6,285	1 / 370	0
1985	5,593	1 / 374	0
1989	4,877	0 / 374	▼1
1993	5,115	1 / 374	▲1
1997	4,538	1 / 374	0
2001	4,417	1 / 374	0
2005-2013	Did not run		
2017	5,267	0 / 205	0
2021	Did not run		

Mayors

Election	Seats	+/–
2005	0 / 98	0
2009	0 / 98	0
2013	0 / 98	0
2017	0 / 98	0
2021	1 / 98	▲1

== See also ==
- April 1920 Danish Folketing election
- Danish Party
- July 1920 Danish Folketing election
- September 1920 Danish Folketing election
- South Schleswig Voters' Association
- 1920 Schleswig plebiscites
