= 1943 Danish Landsting election =

Landsting elections were held in Denmark on 6 April 1943, with the exception that the electors were elected on 23 March. Along with the corresponding Folketing election, it was the first election during the German occupation, and although many people feared how the Germans might react to the election, the event took place peacefully.

The voter turnout was an unusually high 88.8%, and along with the Folketing election of the same year the election became a demonstration against the occupation. After the elections, leading German newspapers expressed disappointment and indignation with the lack of political evolution among the Danish voters.

Of the seven constituencies the seats elected by the resigning parliament and the seats representing constituencies number two (Copenhagen County, Frederiksborg County, Holbæk County, Sorø County, Præstø County and Maribo County), number three (Bornholm County) and number five (Vejle County, Aarhus County, Skanderborg County, Ringkøbing County, Ribe County, Aabenraa County, Haderslev County, Sønderborg County and Tønder County). Constituency number seven, which represented the Faroe Islands, had previously held elections simultaneously with these three constituencies but the election on the Faroe Islands was postponed for four years until the 1947 election.

== Results ==
Elections were not held in the Faroe Islands as the sole Faroese member was elected by the Løgting in the 1939 elections.

Party	Votes	%	Electors	Seats			
Party	Votes	%	Electors	People's	Parliament	Total	+/–
Social Democratic Party	291,767	40.51	830	12	22	34	–1
Venstre	169,032	23.47	488	7	11	18	0
Conservative People's Party	148,050	20.56	396	6	8	14	+1
Danish Social Liberal Party	71,429	9.92	183	3	5	8	0
National Socialist Workers' Party	14,407	2.00	19	0	0	0	0
Justice Party of Denmark	11,020	1.53	13	0	0	0	0
Farmers' Party	8,117	1.13	13	0	1	1	0
Danish Unity	6,392	0.89	8	0	0	0	0
Faroese representative			–	0	0	1	0
Total	720,214	100.00	1,950	28	47	76	0
Valid votes	720,214	99.13					
Invalid/blank votes	6,286	0.87					
Total votes	726,500	100.00					
Source: Thorborg, Wendt, Møller
