= 1939 Danish Landsting election =

Landsting elections were held in Denmark on 14 April 1939, with the exception that the electors that elected the candidates standing in the constituencies were elected on 3 April.

As the election followed a dissolution of both chambers in order to call a referendum on changing the constitution, the seats of all seven constituencies as well as the seats elected by the parliament were up for election.

The referendum was held on 23 May but failed due to a low voter turnout.

== Results ==
Party	Votes	%	Electors	Seats			
Party	Votes	%	Electors	People's	Parliament	Total	+/–
Social Democratic Party	509,132	41.43	1,663	27	8	35	+4
Venstre	248,495	20.22	829	13	5	18	–4
Conservative People's Party	236,075	19.21	702	9	4	13	–2
Danish Social Liberal Party	124,925	10.17	370	6	2	8	+1
Free People's Party	35,835	2.92	97	1	0	1	+1
Communist Party of Denmark	19,934	1.62	34	0	0	0	New
National Socialist Workers' Party	15,889	1.29	12	0	0	0	0
Justice Party of Denmark	18,129	1.48	24	0	0	0	0
Schleswig Party	11,122	0.91	31	0	0	0	0
National Cooperation	7,087	0.58	6	0	0	0	New
Danish Unity	2,317	0.19	0	0	0	0	New
Faroese representative			–	0	0	1	0
Total	1,228,940	100.00	3,768	56	19	76	0
Source: Wendt, Nordengaard
