= 1943 Danish local elections =

Regional elections were held in Denmark on 5 May 1943. 10569 municipal council members were elected, as well as 299 members of the amts of Denmark.
In the amts of Southern Jutland, there wasn't an election in 1943, but the numbers from the previous election were recorded again.

== Results ==
The results of the regional elections:

=== Amt Councils ===
| Party | Seats |
|---|---|
| Venstre | 123 |
| Social Democrats | 92 |
| Conservative People's Party | 36 |
| Danish Social Liberal Party | 30 |
| Schleswig Party | 6 |
| National Socialist Workers' Party | 3 |
| Farmers' Party | 2 |
| Others | 7 |
| Total | 299 |

=== Municipal Councils ===
| Party | Seats |
|---|---|
| Social Democrats | 2,713 |
| Venstre | 2,217 |
| Danish Social Liberal Party | 941 |
| Conservative People's Party | 724 |
| Others | 3,822 |
| Outside election | 152 |
| Total | 10,569 |
