= Bondepartiet =

The name Bondepartiet (Farmers' Party) can refer to:

- The name of Norway's Centre Party until 1959
- Farmers' Party, a Danish political party, founded in 1934 and dissolved in 1945
