= 1936 Danish Landsting election =

Landsting elections were held in Denmark on 22 September 1936, with the exceptions that the electors were elected on 15 September and that the candidates elected by the resigning parliament were elected on 14 August.

The election was a victory for the government parties, the Social Democratic Party and Det Radikale Venstre, and for the first time since 1870 did a Danish government have a majority of the seats in both chambers of parliament.

Of the seven constituencies the seats elected by the resigning parliament and the seats representing constituencies number two (Copenhagen County, Frederiksborg County, Holbæk County, Sorø County, Præstø County and Maribo County), number three (Bornholm County), number five (Vejle County, Aarhus County, Skanderborg County, Ringkøbing County, Ribe County, Aabenraa County, Haderslev County, Sønderborg County and Tønder County) and number seven (the Faroe Islands, which was elected by the Løgting).

== Results ==
Party	Votes	%	Electors	Seats				
Party	Votes	%	Electors	People's	Parliament	Not up	Total	+/–
Social Democratic Party	228,685	39.70	767	12	7	12	31	+4
Venstre	132,264	22.96	459	7	7	8	22	–6
Conservative People's Party	118,094	20.50	378	6	3	6	15	+2
Danish Social Liberal Party	57,109	9.91	177	3	2	2	7	0
Free People's Party	19,624	3.41	48	0	0	0	0	0
Justice Party of Denmark	9,427	1.64	11	0	0	0	0	0
Schleswig Party	8,868	1.54	30	0	0	0	0	0
National Socialist Workers' Party	2,012	0.35	3	0	0	0	0	0
Faroese representative			–	0	0	0	1	0
Total	576,083	100.00	1,873	28	19	28	76	0
Source: Wendt, Nordengaard
