= Cay Lembcke =

Danish politician (1885–1965)

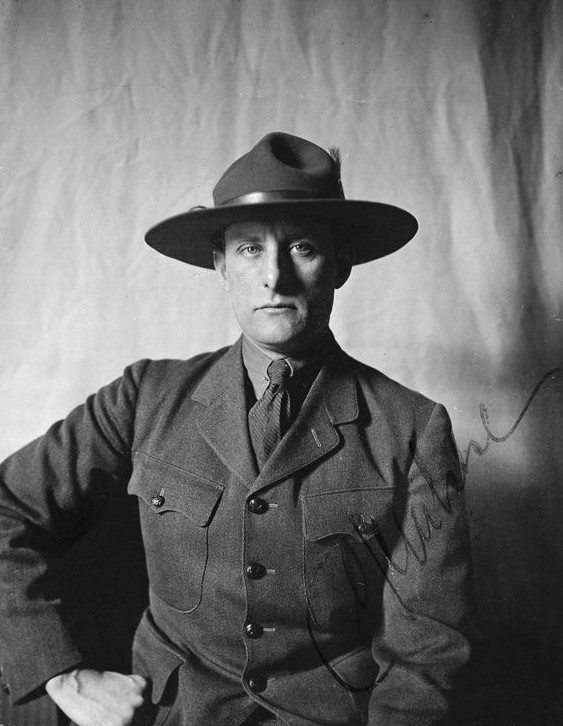
- Lembcke in Boy Scout uniform

Fører of the National Socialist Workers' Party of Denmark
- In office 16 November 1930 – 26 July 1933
- Preceded by: Office established
- Succeeded by: Frits Clausen

Personal details
- Born: 15 December 1885 Copenhagen, Denmark
- Died: 31 January 1965 (aged 79)
- Party: National Socialist Workers' Party of Denmark
- Known for: Co-founder of the Danish Boy Scouts Organization

Military service
- Allegiance: Denmark
- Branch/service: Royal Danish Army
- Years of service: ?–1923
- Rank: Ritmester
- Unit: Guard Hussar Regiment

Cay Lembcke (15 December 1885 – 31 January 1965) was a co-founder of the Danish Boy Scouts Organization in 1910 and the National Socialist Workers' Party of Denmark in 1930. He was captain of the Danish Guard Hussars until his resignation in 1923, following public disagreement with the Danish government over budget cuts in the Danish defence.

Lembcke was co-founder of the Danish Boy Scouts Organization (Det Danske Spejderkorps). He wrote a Danish adaptation of Robert Baden-Powell's Scouting for Boys in December 1910, titled "Patrouilleøvelser for Drenge" (Patrol exercises for Boys). He left the Danish Boy Scout movement in 1923, after many years of disagreement because of his fascist tendencies.

Following the success of the National Socialist German Workers' Party in the 1930 German federal election, Lembcke was the co-founder of National Socialist Workers' Party of Denmark (Danmarks National Socialistiske Arbejderparti) and the first leader of the party. After a disappointing 1932 Danish general election result, Lembcke was replaced as leader by Frits Clausen in July 1933.
