= 1954 Danish local elections =

Regional elections were held in Denmark on 2 March 1954. 11505 municipal council members were elected, as well as 299 members of the amts of Denmark.

== Results of regional elections ==
The results of the regional elections:

=== Amt Councils ===
Party	Seats
Liberals (Venstre) (D)	127
Social Democrats (Socialdemokratiet) (A)	97
Conservative People's Party (Det Konservative Folkeparti) (C)	36
Social Liberal Party (Det Radikale Venstre) (B)	31
Schleswig Party (Slesvigsk Parti) (S)	3
Justice Party of Denmark (Retsforbundet) (E)	2
Others	3
Total	299

=== Municipal Councils ===
Party	Seats
Social Democrats (Socialdemokratiet) (A)	3139
Liberals (Venstre) (V)	2353
Social Liberal Party (Det Radikale Venstre) (B)	764
Conservative People's Party (Det Konservative Folkeparti) (C)	609
Communist Party (Kommunistiske Parti) (K)	29
Others	4433
Outside election	178
Total	11505
