= 1962 Danish local elections =

Regional elections were held in Denmark on 6 March 1962. 11414 municipal council members were elected to the 1 April 1962 - 31 March 1966 term of office in more than 1,300 municipalities, as well as 301 members of the 25 counties of Denmark.

== Results of regional elections ==
The results of the regional elections:

=== County Councils ===
Party	Seats
Liberals (Venstre) (D)	127
Social Democrats (Socialdemokratiet) (A)	100
Conservative People's Party (Det Konservative Folkeparti) (C)	47
Social Liberal Party (Det Radikale Venstre) (B)	21
Schleswig Party (Slesvigsk Parti) (S)	2
Socialist People's Party (Socialistisk Folkeparti) (F)	1
Others	3
Total	301

=== Municipal Councils ===
Party	Seats
Social Democrats (Socialdemokratiet) (A)	3097
Liberals (Venstre) (V)	2196
Conservative People's Party (Det Konservative Folkeparti) (C)	707
Social Liberal Party (Det Radikale Venstre) (B)	501
Socialist People's Party (Socialistisk Folkeparti) (F)	45
Justice Party of Denmark (Retsforbundet) (E)	17
Communist Party (Kommunistiske Parti) (K)	7
Others	4716
Outside election	128
Total	11414
