= 1966 Danish local elections =

Regional elections were held in Denmark on 8 March 1966. 10005 municipal council members were elected to the 1 April 1966 - 31 March 1970 term of office in more than 1,100 municipalities, as well as 303 members of the 25 counties of Denmark.

== Results of regional elections ==
The results of the regional elections:

=== County Councils ===
Party	Seats
Liberals (Venstre) (D)	115
Social Democrats (Socialdemokratiet) (A)	99
Conservative People's Party (Det Konservative Folkeparti) (C)	59
Social Liberal Party (Det Radikale Venstre) (B)	22
Schleswig Party (Slesvigsk Parti) (S)	3
Socialist People's Party (Socialistisk Folkeparti) (F)	1
Others	4
Total	303

=== Municipal Councils ===
Party	Seats
Social Democrats (Socialdemokratiet) (A)	2638
Liberals (Venstre) (V)	1747
Conservative People's Party (Det Konservative Folkeparti) (C)	842
Social Liberal Party (Det Radikale Venstre) (B)	340
Socialist People's Party (Socialistisk Folkeparti) (F)	74
Schleswig Party (Slesvigsk Parti) (S)	42
Justice Party of Denmark (Retsforbundet) (E)	8
Others	4170
Outside election	136
Total	10005
