= 1947 Danish Landsting election =

Landsting elections were held in Denmark in March and April 1947. The public elected members of the electoral college on 1 April, who in turn elected 29 members of the Landsting on 11 April. A further 19 members were elected by outgoing parliament on 7 March, while a Faroese member was elected by the Løgting on 26 March.

Of the seven constituencies the seats representing constituencies number one (Copenhagen), four (Odense and Svendborg County), six (Hjørring, Aalborg, Thisted, Viborg and Randers County) and seven (the Faroe Islands) were up for election.

John Christmas Møller attributed the decline of his party—the Conservative People's Party—to his position regarding Southern Schleswig and resigned as parliamentary group leader as a consequence.

== Results ==
Party	Votes	%	Electors	Seats				
Party	Votes	%	Electors	People's	Parliament	Not up	Total	+/–
Social Democratic Party	303,220	42.50	882	12	9	12	33	–1
Venstre	165,088	23.14	553	9	5	7	21	+2
Conservative People's Party	103,019	14.44	287	4	3	6	13	–1
Communist Party of Denmark	71,911	10.08	177	1	0	0	1	+1
Danish Social Liberal Party	43,307	6.07	117	2	2	3	7	–1
Justice Party of Denmark	18,352	2.57	28	0	0	0	0	0
Danish Unity	8,554	1.20	6	0	0	0	0	0
Faroese representative			–	0	0	0	1	0
Total	713,451	100.00	2,050	28	19	28	76	0
Valid votes	713,451	99.78						
Invalid/blank votes	1,567	0.22						
Total votes	715,018	100.00						
Registered voters/turnout	903,422	79.15						
Source: Svanstrup, Thorborg, Møller
