= 1950 Danish local elections =

Regional elections were held in Denmark on 14 March 1950. 11499 municipal council members were elected, as well as 299 members of the counties (Danish, amter, singular, amt) of Denmark.

== Results of regional elections ==
The results of the regional elections:

=== Amt Councils ===
Party	Seats
Liberals (Venstre) (D)	128
Social Democrats (Socialdemokratiet) (A)	89
Conservative People's Party (Det Konservative Folkeparti) (C)	37
Social Liberal Party (Det Radikale Venstre) (B)	27
Justice Party of Denmark (Retsforbundet) (E)	11
Schleswig Party (Slesvigsk Parti) (S)	2
Others	5
Total	299

=== Municipal Councils ===
Party	Seats
Social Democrats (Socialdemokratiet) (A)	2960
Liberals (Venstre) (V)	2342
Social Liberal Party (Det Radikale Venstre) (B)	824
Conservative People's Party (Det Konservative Folkeparti) (C)	647
Communist Party (Kommunistiske Parti) (K)	33
Others	4501
Outside election	192
Total	11499
