= 1928 Danish Landsting election =

Landsting elections were held in Denmark on 21 September 1928, with the exceptions that the electors were elected on 14 September, that the candidates elected by the resigning parliament were elected on 15 August, and that the Faroese candidate was elected by the Løgting on 23 August.

Of the seven constituencies the seats elected by the resigning parliament and the seats representing constituencies number two (Copenhagen County, Frederiksborg County, Holbæk County, Sorø County, Præstø County and Maribo County), number three (Bornholm County), number five (Vejle County, Aarhus County, Skanderborg County, Ringkøbing County, Ribe County, Aabenraa County, Haderslev County, Sønderborg County and Tønder County) and number seven (the Faroe Islands).

== Results ==
Party	Votes	%	Electors	Seats				
Party	Votes	%	Electors	People's	Parliament	Not up	Total	+/–
Venstre	168,612	35.10	645	12	8	8	28	−3
Social Democratic Party	166,382	34.63	612	9	6	12	27	+2
Conservative People's Party	77,757	16.18	267	4	3	5	12	0
Danish Social Liberal Party	53,979	11.24	184	3	2	3	8	0
Schleswig Party	6,736	1.40	29	0	0	0	0	0
Justice Party of Denmark	5,944	1.24	4	0	0	0	0	0
Other parties	1,019	0.21	2	0	0	0	0	0
Faroese representative			–	1	0	0	1	+1
Total	480,429	100.00	1,743	29	19	28	76	0
Source: Wendt, Nordengaard
