= 1932 Danish Landsting election =

Landsting elections were held in Denmark on 13 September 1932, with the exception that the electors were elected on 5 September.

Of the seven constituencies the seats representing constituencies number one (Copenhagen), four (Odense and Svendborg County) and six (Hjørring, Aalborg, Thisted, Viborg and Randers County) were up for election.

== Results ==
Party	Votes	%	Seats			
Party	Votes	%	Won	Not up	Total	+/–
Social Democratic Party	232,166	42.36	12	15	27	0
Conservative People's Party	127,902	23.34	6	7	13	+1
Venstre	122,035	22.27	8	20	28	0
Danish Social Liberal Party	50,049	9.13	2	5	7	–1
Farmers' Association	7,414	1.35	0	0	0	0
Justice Party of Denmark	6,407	1.17	0	0	0	0
Communist Party of Denmark	423	0.08	0	0	0	0
Other parties	1,703	0.31	0	0	0	0
Faroese representative			–	1	1	0
Total	548,099	100.00	28	48	76	0
Source: Wendt, Nordengaard
