= 1939 Danish Folketing election =

Election for the lower house of Danish Parliament

- 3 April 1939
- All 149 seats in the Folketing; 75 seats needed for a majority
Party	Leader	Vote %	Seats	+/–
Elected in Denmark
Social Democrats	Thorvald Stauning	42.92	64	−4
Venstre	Thomas Madsen-Mygdal	18.20	30	+2
Conservatives	Christmas Møller	17.74	26	0
Social Liberals	Peter Rochegune Munch	9.52	14	0
Farmers'	Valdemar Thomsen	2.99	4	−1
Communists	Aksel Larsen	2.41	3	+1
Justice	Collective leadership	1.99	3	−1
National Socialists	Frits Clausen	1.83	3	+3
Schleswig Party	Jens Møller	0.88	1	0
Elected in the Faroe Islands
Union	Andrass Samuelsen	34.69	1	0
This lists parties that won seats. See the complete results below.
Prime Minister before	Prime Minister after
Thorvald Stauning; Social Democrats	Thorvald Stauning; Social Democrats

Folketing elections were held in Denmark on 3 April 1939, except in the Faroe Islands where they were held on 19 April. They followed a dissolution of both chambers in order to call a referendum on changing the constitution. The referendum was held on 23 May but failed due to a low voter turnout. The result of the elections was a victory for the Social Democratic Party, which won 64 of the 149 seats. Voter turnout was 79.2% in Denmark proper and 47.8% in the Faroes.

== Results ==
Party	Votes	%	Seats	+/–
Denmark
Social Democratic Party	729,619	42.92	64	–4
Venstre	309,355	18.20	30	+2
Conservative People's Party	301,625	17.74	26	0
Danish Social Liberal Party	161,834	9.52	14	0
Farmers' Party	50,829	2.99	4	–1
Communist Party of Denmark	40,893	2.41	3	+1
Justice Party of Denmark	33,783	1.99	3	–1
National Socialist Workers' Party	31,032	1.83	3	+3
National Cooperation	17,350	1.02	0	New
Schleswig Party	15,016	0.88	1	0
Danish Unity	8,553	0.50	0	New
Total	1,699,889	100.00	148	0
Valid votes	1,699,889	99.43		
Invalid/blank votes	9,667	0.57		
Total votes	1,709,556	100.00		
Registered voters/turnout	2,159,356	79.17		
Faroe Islands
Union Party	2,180	34.69	1	0
Social Democratic Party	1,353	21.53	0	0
Business Party	588	9.36	0	New
Self-Government	314	5.00	0	New
Independents	1,849	29.42	0	0
Total	6,284	100.00	1	0
Valid votes	6,284	99.62		
Invalid/blank votes	24	0.38		
Total votes	6,308	100.00		
Registered voters/turnout	13,197	47.80		
Source: Danmarks Statistik
