= 1935 Danish Folketing election =

Election for the lower house of Danish Parliament

- 22 October 1935
- All 149 seats in the Folketing; 75 seats needed for a majority
Party	Leader	Vote %	Seats	+/–
Elected in Denmark
Social Democrats	Thorvald Stauning	46.11	68	+6
Venstre	Thomas Madsen-Mygdal	17.82	28	−10
Conservatives	Christmas Møller	17.75	26	−1
Social Liberals	Peter Rochegune Munch	9.20	14	0
Farmers'		3.21	5	New
Justice	Collective leadership	2.50	4	0
Communists	Aksel Larsen	1.65	2	0
Schleswig Party		0.77	1	0
Elected in the Faroe Islands
Union	Andrass Samuelsen	41.22	1	0
This lists parties that won seats. See the complete results below.
Prime Minister before	Prime Minister after
Thorvald Stauning; Social Democrats	Thorvald Stauning; Social Democrats

Folketing elections were held in Denmark on 22 October 1935, except in the Faroe Islands where they were held on 11 November. The Social Democratic Party led by Prime minister Thorvald Stauning remained the largest in the Folketing, winning 68 of the 149 seats. Voter turnout was 80.7% in Denmark proper and 55.4% in the Faroes. It was in this election that the Social Democrats used the famous slogan "Stauning or Chaos".

== Results ==
Party	Votes	%	Seats	+/–
Denmark
Social Democratic Party	759,102	46.11	68	+6
Conservative People's Party	293,393	17.82	26	–1
Venstre	292,247	17.75	28	–10
Danish Social Liberal Party	151,507	9.20	14	0
Farmers' Party	52,793	3.21	5	New
Justice Party of Denmark	41,199	2.50	4	0
Communist Party of Denmark	27,135	1.65	2	0
National Socialist Workers' Party	16,257	0.99	0	0
Schleswig Party	12,617	0.77	1	0
Society Party	188	0.01	0	New
Total	1,646,438	100.00	148	0
Valid votes	1,646,438	99.72		
Invalid/blank votes	4,694	0.28		
Total votes	1,651,132	100.00		
Registered voters/turnout	2,044,997	80.74		
Faroe Islands
Union Party–Venstre	2,732	41.22	1	0
Social Democratic Party	1,717	25.91	0	0
Independents	2,179	32.88	0	0
Total	6,628	100.00	1	0
Valid votes	6,628	99.47		
Invalid/blank votes	35	0.53		
Total votes	6,663	100.00		
Registered voters/turnout	12,021	55.43		
Source: Nohlen & Stöver
