= 1929 Danish Folketing election =

Election for the lower house of Danish Parliament

- 24 April 1929
- All 149 seats in the Folketing; 75 seats needed for a majority
Party	Leader	Vote %	Seats	+/–
Elected in Denmark
Social Democrats	Thorvald Stauning	41.77	61	+8
Venstre	Thomas Madsen-Mygdal	28.31	43	−3
Conservatives	Christmas Møller	16.47	24	−6
Social Liberals	Peter Rochegune Munch	10.68	16	0
Justice	Collective leadership	1.82	3	+1
Schleswig Party	Johannes Schmidt-Wodder	0.69	1	0
Elected in the Faroe Islands
Union	Andrass Samuelsen	55.63	1	0
This lists parties that won seats. See the complete results below.
Prime Minister before	Prime Minister after
Thomas Madsen-Mygdal; Venstre	Thorvald Stauning; Social Democrats

Folketing elections were held in Denmark on 24 April 1929, except in the Faroe Islands where they were held on 29 May. The Social Democratic Party remained the largest in the Folketing, with 61 of the 149 seats. Voter turnout was 79.7% in Denmark proper and 58.0% in the Faroes. Social Democrat Thorvald Stauning returned to the Prime Ministership by forming a coalition government with the Social Liberals, a position he would hold until 1942.

== Results ==
Party	Votes	%	Seats	+/–
Denmark
Social Democratic Party	593,191	41.77	61	+8
Venstre	402,121	28.31	43	–3
Conservative People's Party	233,935	16.47	24	–6
Danish Social Liberal Party	151,746	10.68	16	0
Justice Party of Denmark	25,810	1.82	3	+1
Schleswig Party	9,787	0.69	1	0
Communist Party of Denmark	3,656	0.26	0	0
Total	1,420,246	100.00	148	0
Valid votes	1,420,246	99.80		
Invalid/blank votes	2,904	0.20		
Total votes	1,423,150	100.00		
Registered voters/turnout	1,786,092	79.68		
Faroe Islands
Union Party–Venstre	3,486	55.63	1	0
Social Democratic Party	2,780	44.37	0	0
Total	6,266	100.00	1	0
Valid votes	6,266	99.73		
Invalid/blank votes	17	0.27		
Total votes	6,283	100.00		
Registered voters/turnout	10,837	57.98		
Source: Nohlen & Stöver
