= 1943 Danish Folketing election =

Election for the lower house of Danish Parliament

- 23 March 1943
- All 149 seats in the Folketing; 75 seats needed for a majority
Party	Leader	Vote %	Seats	+/–
Social Democrats	Hans Hedtoft	44.49	66	+2
Conservatives	Christmas Møller	20.96	31	+5
Venstre	Knud Kristensen	18.74	28	−2
Social Liberals	Jørgen Jørgensen	8.71	13	−1
Danish Unity	Arne Sørensen	2.16	3	+3
National Socialists	Frits Clausen	2.15	3	0
Justice	Oluf Pedersen	1.56	2	−1
Farmers'	Valdemar Thomsen	1.22	2	−2
Elected in the Faroe Islands
Independent (F)	Jóannes Patursson	48.31	1	New
This lists parties that won seats. See the complete results below.
Prime Minister before	Prime Minister after
Erik Scavenius; Nonpartisan	Erik Scavenius; Nonpartisan

Folketing elections were held in Denmark on 23 March 1943 alongside Landsting elections, except in the Faroe Islands where they were held on 3 May. They were the only parliamentary elections held during the German occupation, and although many people feared how the Germans might react, they took place peacefully.

Nazi Germany permitted the election to proceed and had consistently maintained that Denmark was still an independent country. They had also reportedly provided substantial financial support for the Danish National Socialist Workers' Party. The five democratic parties (Social Democrats, Conservatives, Venstre, Social Liberal and the Justice Party) urged voters to support any of them. The Communist Party had been banned since 1941 and could not participate in the elections.

95% of the vote went to the four largest traditional democratic parties and the Social Democratic Party remained the largest in the Folketing, winning 66 of the 149 seats. Voter turnout was 89% in mainland Denmark, the highest of any Danish parliamentary election, and became a demonstration against the occupation. Leading German newspapers expressed disappointment and indignation with the lack of political evolution among the Danish voters. In Denmark there has been some debate about whether this can be seen as democratic support for the government's "cooperation" policy (samarbejdspolitikken) with the German occupation authorities. Some have argued that the result showed a broad unity of opinion in the population and among politicians in support of the relatively cooperative line taken by the government. Bertel Haarder, citing Knud Kristensen, has argued that the vote was sold as one of solidarity with the Danish constitution, democracy, and a rejection of totalitarian elements in society, and cannot therefore be seen as an explicit endorsement by the population of the government's line. Political scientist Ben Arneson stated "the result of the elections clearly indicates that democracy, parliamentarism, and strong anti-Nazi attitudes retain well-nigh universal support of the Danish electorate."

== Results ==
Party	Votes	%	Seats	+/–
Denmark proper
Social Democrats	894,632	44.49	66	+2
Conservative People's Party	421,523	20.96	31	+5
Venstre	376,850	18.74	28	–2
Danish Social Liberal Party	175,179	8.71	13	–1
Danish Unity	43,367	2.16	3	+3
National Socialist Workers' Party	43,309	2.15	3	0
Justice Party of Denmark	31,323	1.56	2	–1
Farmers' Party	24,572	1.22	2	–2
Independents	28	0.00	0	0
Total	2,010,783	100.00	148	0
Valid votes	2,010,783	98.54		
Invalid/blank votes	29,800	1.46		
Total votes	2,040,583	100.00		
Registered voters/turnout	2,280,716	89.47		
Faroe Islands
Independent (People's Party) (Note: The Faroe Islands seat was won by Þ. Petersen, an independent who was a member of the People's Party. However, as Faroes were controlled by the United Kingdom during the war, his election victory was not recognised until 16 August 1945, only two and a half months before the elections that year.)	3,452	48.31	1	+1
Union Party–Venstre	2,308	32.30	0	–1
Social Democratic Party	1,385	19.38	0	0
Total	7,145	100.00	1	0
Source: Nohlen & Stöver
