= 1926 Danish Folketing election =

Election for the lower house of Danish Parliament

- 2 December 1926
- All 149 seats in the Folketing; 75 seats needed for a majority
Party	Leader	Vote %	Seats	+/–
Elected in Denmark
Social Democrats	Thorvald Stauning	37.16	53	−2
Venstre	Thomas Madsen-Mygdal	28.27	46	+2
Conservatives	Emil Piper	20.62	30	+2
Social Liberals	Carl Theodor Zahle	11.28	16	−4
Justice	Collective leadership	1.31	2	+2
Schleswig Party	Johannes Schmidt-Wodder	0.78	1	0
Elected in the Faroe Islands
Union	Andrass Samuelsen	63.05	1	0
This lists parties that won seats. See the complete results below.
Prime Minister before	Prime Minister after
Thorvald Stauning; Social Democrats	Thomas Madsen-Mygdal; Venstre

Folketing elections were held in Denmark on 2 December 1926, except in the Faroe Islands where they were held on 20 December. The Social Democratic Party remained the largest in the Folketing, with 53 of the 149 seats. Voter turnout was 77.0% in Denmark proper and 40.2% in the Faroes.

It was the first election after which radio was used to broadcast the results to the public.

== Results ==
Party	Votes	%	Seats	+/–
Denmark
Social Democratic Party	497,106	37.16	53	–2
Venstre	378,137	28.27	46	+2
Conservative People's Party	275,793	20.62	30	+2
Danish Social Liberal Party	150,931	11.28	16	–4
Justice Party of Denmark	17,463	1.31	2	+2
Schleswig Party	10,422	0.78	1	0
Communist Party of Denmark	5,678	0.42	0	0
Independence Party	2,117	0.16	0	New
Total	1,337,647	100.00	148	0
Valid votes	1,337,647	99.73		
Invalid/blank votes	3,579	0.27		
Total votes	1,341,226	100.00		
Registered voters/turnout	1,742,604	76.97		
Faroe Islands
Union Party–Venstre	2,600	63.05	1	0
Social Democratic Party	1,019	24.71	0	New
Independents	505	12.25	0	New
Total	4,124	100.00	1	0
Valid votes	4,124	99.25		
Invalid/blank votes	31	0.75		
Total votes	4,155	100.00		
Registered voters/turnout	10,325	40.24		
Source: Nohlen & Stöver
