= 1932 Danish Folketing election =

Election for the lower house of Danish Parliament

- 16 November 1932
- All 149 seats in the Folketing; 75 seats needed for a majority
Party	Leader	Vote %	Seats	+/–
Social Democrats	Thorvald Stauning	42.72	62	+1
Venstre	Thomas Madsen-Mygdal	24.68	38	−5
Conservatives	Christmas Møller	18.71	27	+3
Social Liberals	Peter Rochegune Munch	9.39	14	−2
Justice	Collective leadership	2.67	4	+1
Communists	Aksel Larsen	1.11	2	+2
Schleswig Party	Johannes Schmidt-Wodder	0.64	1	0
Elected in the Faroe Islands
Union	Andrass Samuelsen	51.50	1	0
This lists parties that won seats. See the complete results below.
Prime Minister before	Prime Minister after
Thorvald Stauning; Social Democrats	Thorvald Stauning; Social Democrats

Folketing elections were held in Denmark on 16 November 1932, except in the Faroe Islands where they were held on 12 December. The Social Democratic Party remained the largest in the Folketing, with 62 of the 149 seats. Voter turnout was 81.5% in Denmark proper and 59.2% in the Faroes.

== Results ==
Party	Votes	%	Seats	+/–
Denmark
Social Democratic Party	660,839	42.72	62	+1
Venstre	381,862	24.68	38	–5
Conservative People's Party	289,531	18.71	27	+3
Danish Social Liberal Party	145,221	9.39	14	–2
Justice Party of Denmark	41,238	2.67	4	+1
Communist Party of Denmark	17,179	1.11	2	+2
Schleswig Party	9,868	0.64	1	0
National Socialist Workers' Party	757	0.05	0	New
Independents	587	0.04	0	New
Total	1,547,082	100.00	148	0
Valid votes	1,547,082	99.74		
Invalid/blank votes	4,039	0.26		
Total votes	1,551,121	100.00		
Registered voters/turnout	1,902,835	81.52		
Faroe Islands
Union Party–Venstre	3,532	51.50	1	0
Social Democratic Party	677	9.87	0	0
Independents	2,649	38.63	0	New
Total	6,858	100.00	1	0
Valid votes	6,858	99.75		
Invalid/blank votes	17	0.25		
Total votes	6,875	100.00		
Registered voters/turnout	11,619	59.17		
Source: Nohlen & Stöver
