= National Socialist Workers' Party of Denmark =

Former Nazi party in Denmark

National Socialist Workers' Party of Denmark Danmarks Nationalsocialistiske Arbejderparti
- Abbreviation: DNSAP
- Leader: Cay Lembcke (1932–1933); Frits Clausen (1933–1945)
- Founders: Cay Lembcke; Georg Frederiksen; Ejnar Jørgensen; Curt Carlis Hansen; Knud B. Wesseltoft
- Founded: 16 November 1930
- Banned: 8 May 1945
- Succeeded by: National Socialist Movement of Denmark
- Newspaper: Fædrelandet
- Student wing: National Studenter Aktion
- Youth wing: Denmark's National Socialist Youth
- Women's wing: Danske Piger
- Paramilitary wing: Storm Afdeling
- Labour wing: Land-Arbejds-Tjenesten
- Membership (1930 – 1945): 39,000 Total
- Ideology: Danish nationalism Nazism; Fascism; Collaborationism; Antisemitism
- Political position: Far-right
- Religion: Church of Denmark (official)
- Colors: Red, White

Party flag
- Other Flags

The National Socialist Workers' Party of Denmark (Danish: Danmarks Nationalsocialistiske Arbejderparti; DNSAP) was the largest Nazi Party in Denmark before and during the Second World War.

== History ==
The party was founded on 16 November 1930, after the success of the Nazis in the German Reichstag elections of that year. The party mimicked the Nazi Party in Germany, including the use of the swastika and Hitler salute, the naming of their fighting force as SA, and even the singing of a translated version of the Horst Wessel Song. The party was antisemitic, though not to the same degree as the German Nazis.

The party had other differences with the Germans; as Danish nationalists, they wanted the Danish border to grow to the south to take in the whole of the historical Duchy of Schleswig, a move which would have brought more ethnic Germans under Danish rule. The DNSAP considered the Germans of North and South Schleswig to be in reality Germanized Danes, who could be politically led back to their Danish origin. The Germans wanted to incorporate the northern portion of Schleswig into the German state. The DNSAP was also supportive of the principles of loyalty to the Danish monarchy and the Church of Denmark.

The party was initially led by Cay Lembcke, although they attracted no more than a few hundred members under his leadership and failed to gain even minor support in the elections of 1932.

Lembcke was replaced in 1933 by Frits Clausen, who concentrated the activities in his home territory of North Schleswig, where the bulk of support for the DNSAP was to come from. At the 1939 elections, with about 5000 members, the party won three seats in the Folketing (parliament) corresponding to 1.8% of the popular vote.

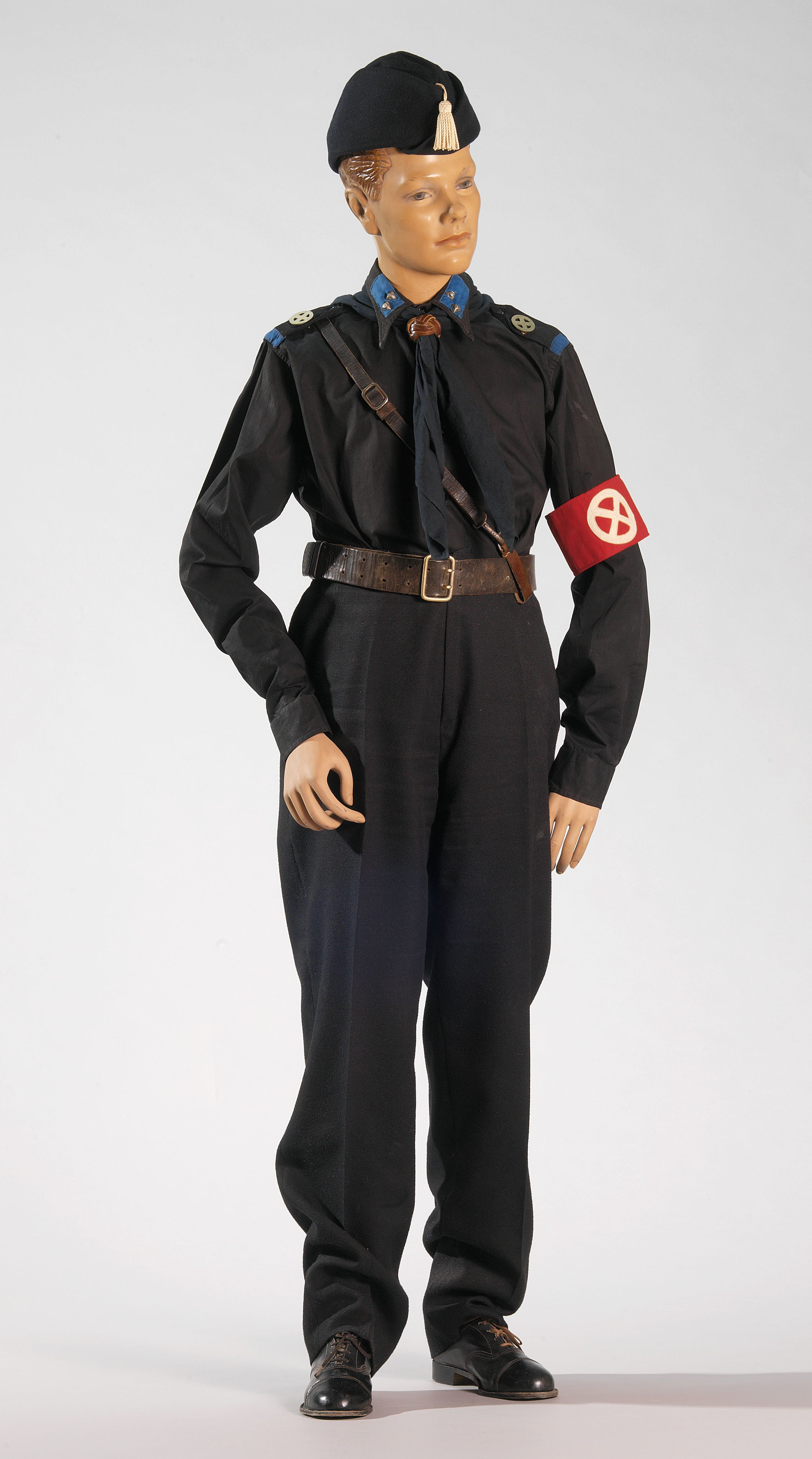
NSU DNSAP Danish Nazi Party Youth organization WWII black uniform introduced by Landsungdomsfører C. F. von Schalburg 1940 sunwheel armband side cap tassel mannequin cross belt. Ranks and insignia of the National Socialist Workers' Party of Denmark.

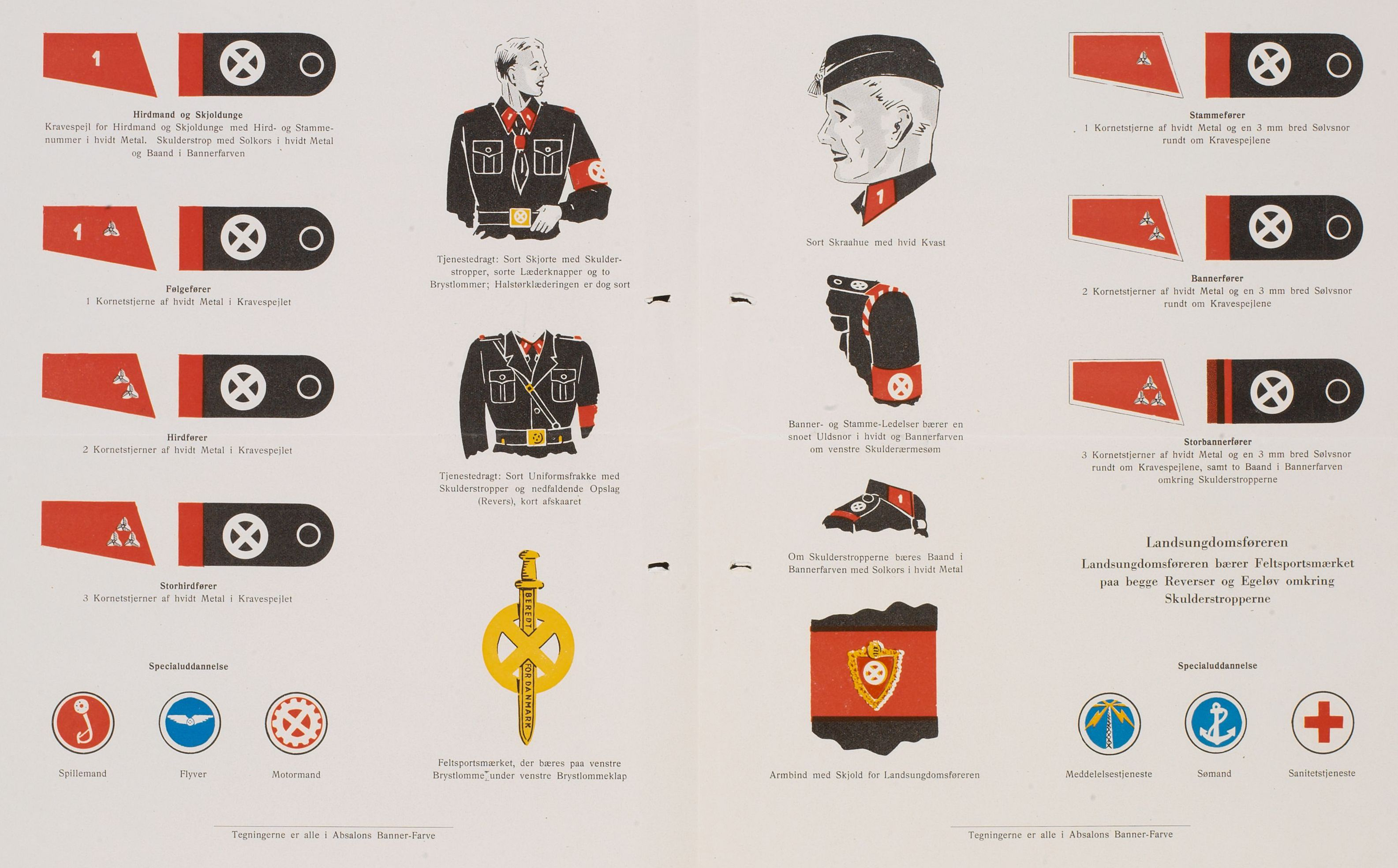
DNSAP Danish Nazi Party Youth and their uniform, 1940

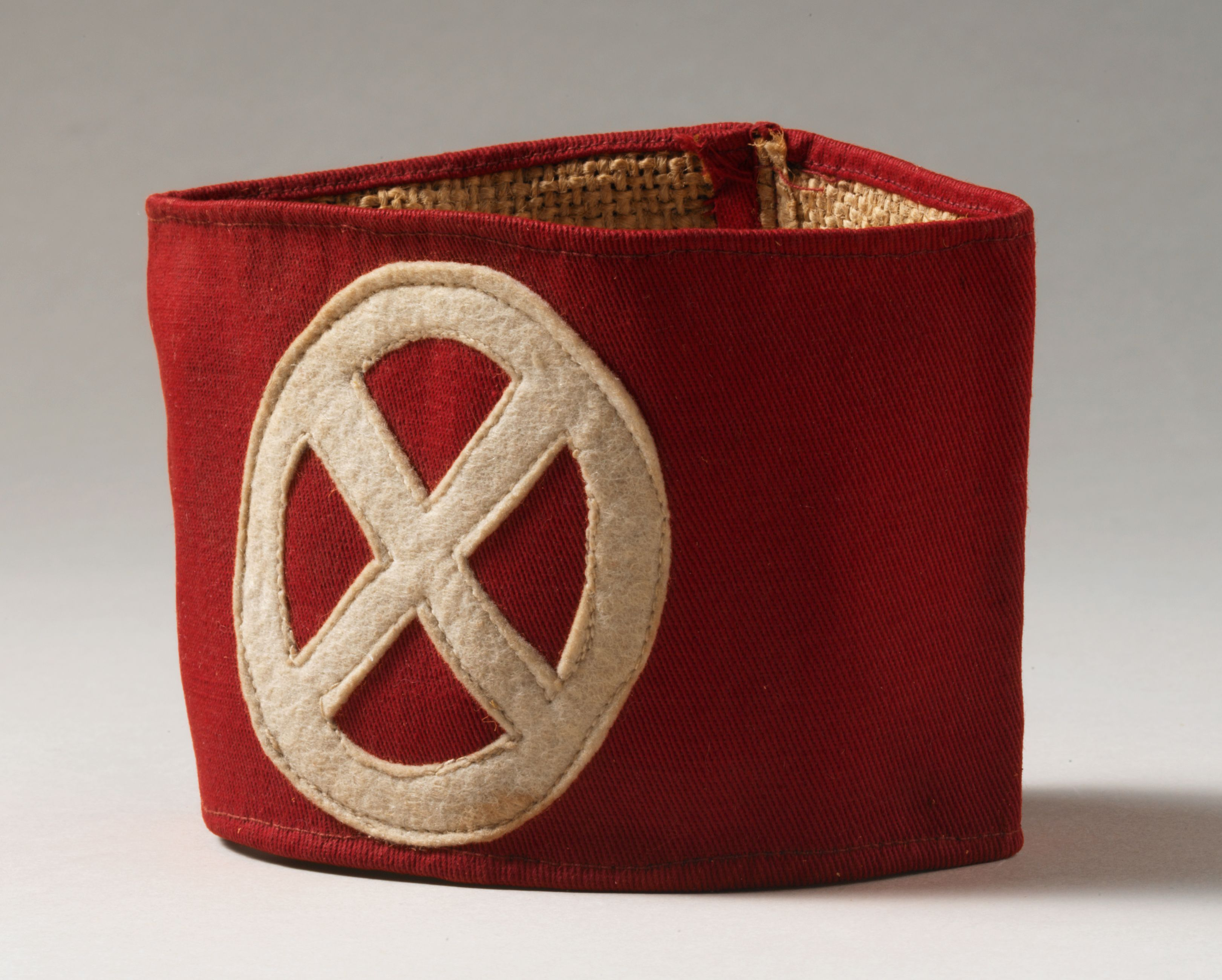
DNSAP Danish Nazi Party Youth organization, 1940

DNSAP supported Hitler's invasion and subsequent occupation of Denmark on 9 April 1940. A transition to Nazi government in Denmark was considered by the German administrator, Cecil von Renthe-Fink, in the end of 1940, but due to the policy of co-operation with the legitimate Danish government, it was deemed better to wait until Germany had won the war, although DNSAP did receive some financial and political support from Germany. A major factor influencing Renthe-Fink's decision was the failure of the party's rally on 17 November 1940, planned to be the signal of the party's takeover of political power in Denmark. The rally was confronted by a huge and hostile crowd, outnumbering the participants several times, and the party members had to be protected by the Danish police. After the rally, the police had to escort the participants to safety to save them from being attacked and beaten up by the bystanders.

A rare victory for the DNSAP was its role in organizing the recruitment for Waffen-SS and Frikorps Danmark (Free Corps Denmark). The DNSAP was not included in the wartime coalition government (1940–1943) and at the 1943 elections it barely improved on its pre-war performance, winning only 2.1% of the votes cast and three seats in the Folketing. The day after the election, the disappointed Clausen renounced German financial support, intending to take a more purely Danish national line.

After the end of the Second World War, the party was officially dissolved in May 1945, and lost almost all of its popular support. However, a few individuals continued their work under the old party name. The current National Socialist Movement of Denmark traces its origins back to the DNSAP.

== Storm Afdeling ==
Storm Afdeling logo

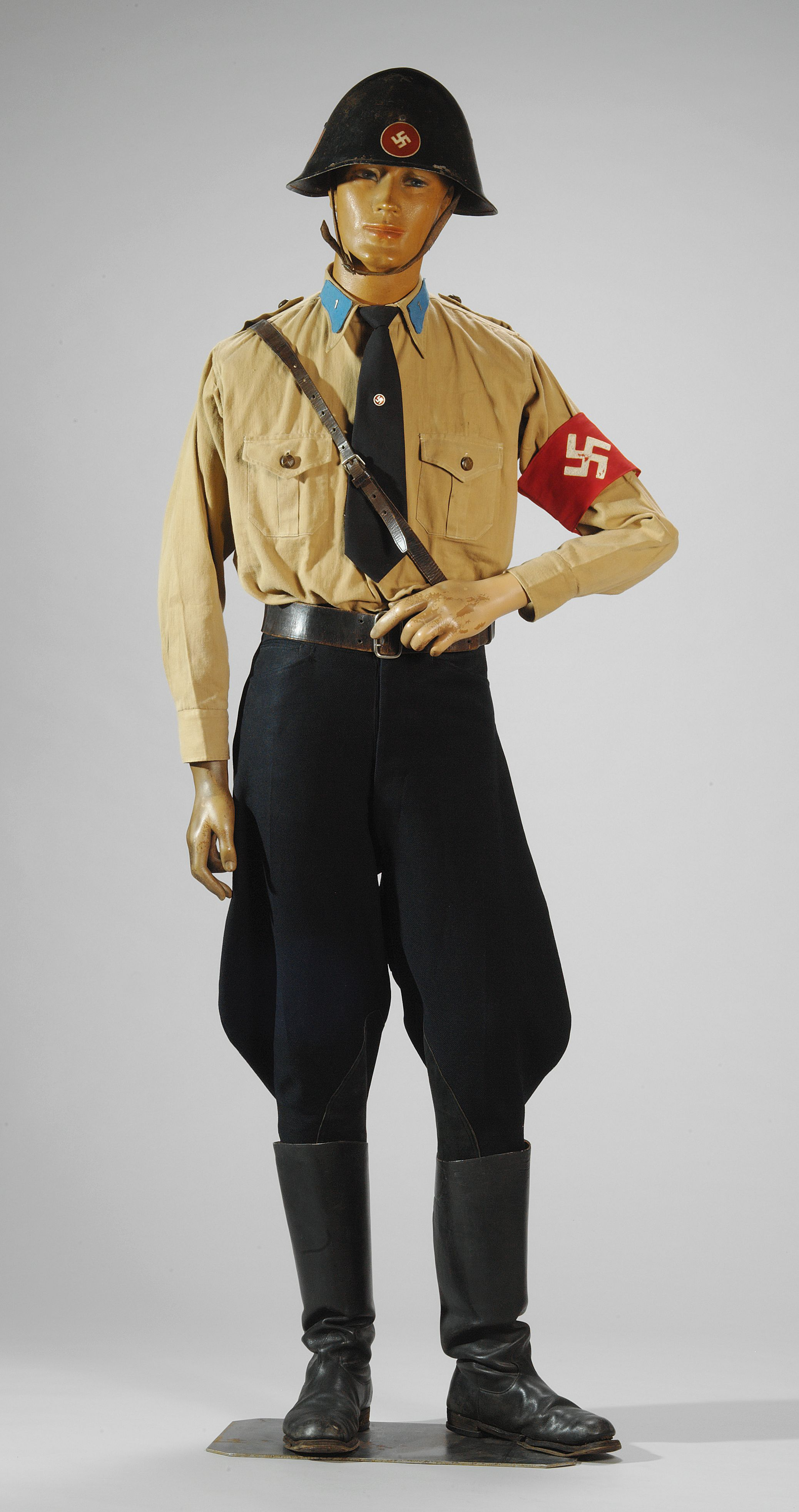
WWII Danish Nazi Party paramilitary uniform Swastika, with armband, steel helmet, brownshirt, Danish uniform of Storm Troopers on this mannequin, National museum of Denmark

The D.N.S.A.P. had its own Storm Troopers — the S.A. (Danish: Storm Afdeling) whose normal service dress was a brown shirt with black breeches and black top boots, a black tie and a black brassard with white swastika. Headgear could be either a black peaked cap or black forage cap. On the peaked cap was a two-part badge consisting of the nation cockade of Denmark and a runic "S" and "A" within white circle. "Full dress" uniform consisted of a brown tunic, black breeches, Sam Browne belt and a cross strap worn with a khaki shirt and tie, and forage cap. On duty, guards wore a Danish army steel helmet with a runic S.A. badge.

== Electoral performance ==
=== Upper house (Landsting) ===
Election	Votes	%	Seats
1936	2,012	(#8)	0 / 76
1939	15,889	(#7)	0 / 76
1943	14,407	(#5)	0 / 76

=== Parliament (Folketing) ===
Election	Votes	%	Seats	References
1932	757	0.1 (#8)	0 / 149	
1935	16,257	1.0 (#8)	0 / 149	
1939	31,032	1.8 (#8)	3 / 149	
1943	43,309	2.1 (#6)	3 / 149	

== See also ==
- Ranks and insignia of the National Socialist Workers' Party of Denmark
- Søren Kam
- Carl Værnet
