= 1939 Danish constitutional referendum =

23 May 1939
- Outcome: Proposal failed as less than 45% of registered voters voted in favour

Results
Choice	Votes	%
Yes	966,277	91.85%
No	85,717	8.15%
Valid votes	1,051,994	98.89%
Invalid or blank votes	11,770	1.11%
Total votes	1,063,764	100.00%
Registered voters/turnout	2,173,420	48.94%

A constitutional referendum was held in Denmark on 23 May 1939. Voters were asked whether they approved of a new constitution. Although it was approved by 91.9% of those who voted, a turnout of only 48.9% meant that the percentage of eligible voters approving it was only 44.46%, below the 45% required by the existing constitution of 1915.

The Danish constitution was finally altered to its present form following a 1953 referendum.

== Proposed changes ==
The two primary changes in the proposed constitution from 1939 were lowering the electoral age from 25 to 23 years, and replacing the Landsting with a new chamber of parliament, the Rigsting.

Additionally, the united parliament (Danish: den forenede rigsdag) consisting of the members of the two other chambers was to become a third chamber of parliament. The united parliament would handle the more important types of bills, including the budget and proposed changes to the constitution. Other bills could be proposed in either the Folketing or the Rigsting, and in order to pass they would have to go through three readings in the chamber in which they originated, and two readings in the other. This would have been a simplification of the existing process where all bills had to go through three readings in each of the two chambers.

== Results ==
Choice	Votes	%
For	966,277	91.85
Against	85,717	8.15
Total	1,051,994	100.00
Valid votes	1,051,994	98.89
Invalid/blank votes	11,770	1.11
Total votes	1,063,764	100.00
Registered voters/turnout	2,173,420	48.94
Source: Nohlen & Stöver

While the result was overwhelmingly in favour of the proposed change, this only had the support of 44.5 per cent of the electorate, falling just short of the 45 per cent threshold required for any constitutional change to come into force.

== See also ==
- The system of qualified unicameralism used in the Norwegian parliament until 2009, similar to the "united parliament" system above.
