= Danish Unity =

Danish Unity Dansk Samling
- Abbreviation: DS; R
- Leader: Morten Uhrskov Jensen
- Founder: Arne Sørensen
- Founded: 1936
- Ideology: Danish nationalism National conservatism Christian nationalism Third Position; Euroscepticism
- Political position: Right-wing

Election symbol
- R

Website
- dksamling.dk

Danish Unity or Danish Collection (Danish: Dansk Samling, DS) is a political party in Denmark, founded in 1936 by Arne Sørensen. In 1939 the National Unity party, established by Victor Pürschel in 1938, merged with the party. It contested elections in 1939, 1943, 1945, 1947, April 1953 and then once more in 1964. It remains as a political organisation.

Danish Folketing election in 1943, 3 seats (yellow) for Danish Unity (Dansk Samling).

Danish Folketing election in 1943, 3 seats (dark blue) for Danish Unity (Dansk Samling).

Folketing in 1943.

In the March 1943 general election - relatively free, though held under German occupation - the party took a clear anti-occupation position, and gained 2.2% of votes cast.

Danish Unity was also a political party doing the Second World War and involved with the Danish resistance movement against the German occupation.^{da}

Based on a form of Christian nationalism, it presented itself as a third way between socialism and liberalism.

It later campaigned against Danish membership in the EU.

In October 2013, Morten Uhrskov Jensen replaced Adam Wagner as national chairman; since then, the organization has had an increase of members. It has one elected representative, a councillor in Herning.
