= Farmers' Party (Denmark) =

Farmers' Party Bondepartiet
- Founded: 1934
- Dissolved: 1945
- Ideology: Agrarianism

Top: Farmers' party. Below: Farmer's well - people's well!

The Farmers' Party (Danish: Bondepartiet), initially known as the Free People's Party (Det Frie Folkeparti), was an agrarian political party in Denmark. It was founded in 1934 as the political wing of Landbrugernes Sammenslutning. At the time of the founding of the party, 3 Venstre MPs joined it.

In 1939 the name was changed to Farmers' Party. The new name was inspired by agrarian parties in other Nordic countries, such as the Farmers' League in Sweden.

In May 1940 the Farmers' Party, the Landbrugernes Sammenslutning and DNSAP formed an alliance, and tried to topple the coalition government. In the June 1939 election the groups created a common front, and worked for the creation of a National Socialist constitution. During the war and occupation, the political support for the party dwindled, especially after 29 August 1943. The party became politically isolated. It did not contest the 1945 election.

In 1948 Axel Hartel, former MP of the party, was sentenced to 14 years imprisonment, the harshest punishment for political collaboration meted out after the war.

== See also ==
- Nordic agrarian parties
