= Hjørring (nomination district) =

- Hjørring
- Nomination district constituency for the Folketing
- Location of Hjørring within North Jutland

- Location of North Jutland within Denmark
- Municipalities: Hjørring
- Constituency: North Jutland
- Electorate: 48,489 (2022)

Current constituency
- Created: 1849 (as constituency); 1920 (as nomination district)

Hjørring nominating district is one of the 92 nominating districts that exists for Danish elections following the 2007 municipal reform. It consists of Hjørring municipality. It was created in 1849 as a constituency, and has been a nomination district since 1920, though its boundaries have been changed since then.

Parties of the often nicknamed blue bloc has received more votes than the red bloc in all the general elections, however the Social Democrats has become largest party in all of them except 2011.

== Election results ==
=== General elections in the 2020s ===
2022 Danish general election

Parties	Vote		
Parties	Votes	%	+ / -
Social Democrats	14,049	35.19	+2.48
Denmark Democrats	6,672	16.71	New
Venstre	5,416	13.56	-15.33
Moderates	2,530	6.34	New
Liberal Alliance	2,334	5.85	+4.60
Conservatives	2,116	5.30	-0.97
Green Left	1,915	4.80	-0.09
New Right	1,667	4.18	+1.75
Red–Green Alliance	1,018	2.55	-1.31
Danish People's Party	815	2.04	-8.11
Social Liberals	615	1.54	-2.34
The Alternative	468	1.17	-0.25
Christian Democrats	213	0.53	-1.12
Jette Møller	50	0.13	New
Independent Greens	49	0.12	New
Total	39,927		

=== General elections in the 2010s ===
2019 Danish general election

Parties	Vote		
Parties	Votes	%	+ / -
Social Democrats	13,147	32.71	+4.90
Venstre	11,609	28.89	+5.44
Danish People's Party	4,078	10.15	-13.49
Conservatives	2,518	6.27	+0.93
Green Left	1,966	4.89	+1.24
Social Liberals	1,558	3.88	+1.33
Red–Green Alliance	1,550	3.86	-1.70
New Right	976	2.43	New
Stram Kurs	756	1.88	New
Christian Democrats	665	1.65	+0.72
The Alternative	572	1.42	-0.92
Liberal Alliance	504	1.25	-3.47
Klaus Riskær Pedersen Party	289	0.72	New
Total	40,188		

2015 Danish general election

Parties	Vote		
Parties	Votes	%	+ / -
Social Democrats	11,585	27.81	-0.19
Danish People's Party	9,848	23.64	+11.75
Venstre	9,769	23.45	-5.72
Red–Green Alliance	2,318	5.56	+1.65
Conservatives	2,225	5.34	-1.76
Liberal Alliance	1,966	4.72	+1.03
Green Left	1,520	3.65	-5.47
Social Liberals	1,062	2.55	-3.66
The Alternative	973	2.34	New
Christian Democrats	389	0.93	+0.05
Hans Schultz	9	0.02	-0.01
Total	41,664		

2011 Danish general election

Parties	Vote		
Parties	Votes	%	+ / -
Venstre	12,521	29.17	+3.14
Social Democrats	12,017	28.00	+0.58
Danish People's Party	5,105	11.89	-1.35
Green Left	3,915	9.12	-0.76
Conservatives	3,046	7.10	-9.05
Social Liberals	2,665	6.21	+2.44
Red–Green Alliance	1,679	3.91	+3.08
Liberal Alliance	1,585	3.69	+2.08
Christian Democrats	377	0.88	-0.16
Hans Schultz	14	0.03	+0.02
Total	42,924		

=== General elections in the 2000s ===
2007 Danish general election

Parties	Vote		
Parties	Votes	%	+ / -
Social Democrats	11,604	27.42	-0.39
Venstre	11,013	26.03	-1.63
Conservatives	6,832	16.15	+0.02
Danish People's Party	5,602	13.24	+1.68
Green Left	4,182	9.88	+6.34
Social Liberals	1,596	3.77	-4.00
New Alliance	680	1.61	New
Christian Democrats	442	1.04	-1.29
Red–Green Alliance	352	0.83	-0.92
Anders Gravers Pedersen	6	0.01	New
Hans Schultz	4	0.01	New
Total	42,313		

2005 Danish general election

Parties	Vote		
Parties	Votes	%	+ / -
Social Democrats	10,081	27.80	-1.42
Venstre	10,025	27.64	-3.27
Conservatives	5,845	16.12	+2.25
Danish People's Party	4,189	11.55	+1.45
Social Liberals	2,816	7.77	+3.42
Green Left	1,283	3.54	-0.24
Christian Democrats	845	2.33	-0.92
Red–Green Alliance	633	1.75	+0.15
Centre Democrats	474	1.31	-1.08
Minority Party	56	0.15	New
Christian Jensen	8	0.02	New
Ivan Johansen	8	0.02	New
Aase Heskjær	1	0.00	New
Total	36,264		

2001 Danish general election

Parties	Vote		
Parties	Votes	%	+ / -
Venstre	11,583	30.91	+7.36
Social Democrats	10,950	29.22	-6.73
Conservatives	5,197	13.87	+5.67
Danish People's Party	3,785	10.10	+6.56
Social Liberals	1,629	4.35	+0.41
Green Left	1,418	3.78	-0.84
Christian People's Party	1,219	3.25	-0.05
Centre Democrats	897	2.39	-2.16
Red–Green Alliance	601	1.60	+0.23
Progress Party	200	0.53	-10.18
Total	37,479		

=== General elections in the 1990s ===
1998 Danish general election

Parties	Vote		
Parties	Votes	%	+ / -
Social Democrats	13,695	35.95	-0.56
Venstre	8,971	23.55	-2.90
Progress Party	4,081	10.71	+1.33
Conservatives	3,124	8.20	-2.59
Green Left	1,759	4.62	+0.32
Centre Democrats	1,734	4.55	+1.83
Social Liberals	1,500	3.94	-1.11
Danish People's Party	1,347	3.54	New
Christian People's Party	1,258	3.30	0.00
Red–Green Alliance	522	1.37	-0.10
Democratic Renewal	95	0.25	New
Henrik Westergaard	11	0.03	New
Total	38,097		

1994 Danish general election

Parties	Vote		
Parties	Votes	%	+ / -
Social Democrats	13,444	36.51	-2.44
Venstre	9,742	26.45	+7.42
Conservatives	3,972	10.79	-0.23
Progress Party	3,454	9.38	-0.25
Social Liberals	1,861	5.05	+0.96
Green Left	1,583	4.30	-0.65
Christian People's Party	1,216	3.30	-1.21
Centre Democrats	1,000	2.72	-2.12
Red–Green Alliance	543	1.47	+0.89
Steen W. Jakobsen	4	0.01	New
Svend Jensen	4	0.01	New
Henning Sørensen	4	0.01	New
Total	36,827		

1990 Danish general election

Parties	Vote		
Parties	Votes	%	+ / -
Social Democrats	14,040	38.95	+7.18
Venstre	6,861	19.03	-0.03
Conservatives	3,974	11.02	-3.30
Progress Party	3,471	9.63	-1.37
Green Left	1,786	4.95	-2.86
Centre Democrats	1,744	4.84	+0.35
Christian People's Party	1,627	4.51	+0.60
Social Liberals	1,473	4.09	-0.56
Common Course	451	1.25	-0.39
Red–Green Alliance	209	0.58	New
The Greens	200	0.55	-0.27
Justice Party of Denmark	188	0.52	New
Humanist Party	13	0.04	New
P. H. Bering	12	0.03	New
Total	36,049		

=== General elections in the 1980s ===
1988 Danish general election

Parties	Vote		
Parties	Votes	%	+ / -
Social Democrats	11,837	31.77	-0.06
Venstre	7,099	19.06	+0.42
Conservatives	5,336	14.32	-1.76
Progress Party	4,098	11.00	+4.97
Green Left	2,909	7.81	-1.09
Social Liberals	1,733	4.65	-0.56
Centre Democrats	1,673	4.49	-0.06
Christian People's Party	1,457	3.91	-0.50
Common Course	611	1.64	-0.33
The Greens	305	0.82	-0.07
Communist Party of Denmark	114	0.31	0.00
Left Socialists	82	0.22	-0.30
Total	37,254		

1987 Danish general election

Parties	Vote		
Parties	Votes	%	+ / -
Social Democrats	11,964	31.83	+1.43
Venstre	7,006	18.64	-1.55
Conservatives	6,044	16.08	-3.34
Green Left	3,345	8.90	+2.33
Progress Party	2,265	6.03	-0.03
Social Liberals	1,959	5.21	+0.36
Centre Democrats	1,712	4.55	-0.45
Christian People's Party	1,656	4.41	-0.51
Common Course	739	1.97	New
The Greens	335	0.89	New
Left Socialists	195	0.52	-0.43
Justice Party of Denmark	187	0.50	-0.80
Communist Party of Denmark	116	0.31	+0.07
Humanist Party	47	0.13	New
Jytte Østerbye	13	0.03	New
Socialist Workers Party	5	0.01	-0.05
Marxist–Leninists Party	2	0.01	-0.04
Total	37,590		

1984 Danish general election

Parties	Vote		
Parties	Votes	%	+ / -
Social Democrats	11,383	30.40	-0.84
Venstre	7,561	20.19	+1.05
Conservatives	7,273	19.42	+10.12
Green Left	2,460	6.57	-0.03
Progress Party	2,268	6.06	-6.63
Centre Democrats	1,871	5.00	-3.90
Christian People's Party	1,841	4.92	+0.01
Social Liberals	1,815	4.85	+0.36
Justice Party of Denmark	487	1.30	-0.06
Left Socialists	357	0.95	+0.13
Communist Party of Denmark	88	0.24	-0.17
Socialist Workers Party	22	0.06	0.00
Marxist–Leninists Party	19	0.05	New
Total	37,445		

1981 Danish general election

Parties	Vote		
Parties	Votes	%	+ / -
Social Democrats	10,985	31.24	-3.01
Venstre	6,732	19.14	-1.55
Progress Party	4,464	12.69	-1.92
Conservatives	3,270	9.30	+0.80
Centre Democrats	3,130	8.90	+5.40
Green Left	2,320	6.60	+3.10
Christian People's Party	1,727	4.91	-0.36
Social Liberals	1,580	4.49	-0.36
Justice Party of Denmark	478	1.36	-0.90
Left Socialists	289	0.82	-0.70
Communist Party of Denmark	144	0.41	-0.42
Communist Workers Party	24	0.07	-0.14
Socialist Workers Party	21	0.06	New
Total	35,164		

=== General elections in the 1970s ===
1979 Danish general election

Parties	Vote		
Parties	Votes	%	+ / -
Social Democrats	12,075	34.25	+4.58
Venstre	7,293	20.69	+1.61
Progress Party	5,151	14.61	-4.14
Conservatives	2,996	8.50	+2.12
Christian People's Party	1,857	5.27	-2.28
Social Liberals	1,710	4.85	+1.54
Green Left	1,235	3.50	+1.66
Centre Democrats	1,234	3.50	-2.61
Justice Party of Denmark	796	2.26	-1.13
Left Socialists	535	1.52	+0.31
Communist Party of Denmark	294	0.83	-1.00
Communist Workers Party	75	0.21	New
Total	35,251		

1977 Danish general election

Parties	Vote		
Parties	Votes	%	+ / -
Social Democrats	10,076	29.67	+6.00
Venstre	6,478	19.08	-13.18
Progress Party	6,367	18.75	+2.90
Christian People's Party	2,563	7.55	-2.09
Conservatives	2,167	6.38	+3.00
Centre Democrats	2,075	6.11	+4.04
Justice Party of Denmark	1,151	3.39	+1.39
Social Liberals	1,124	3.31	-2.59
Green Left	624	1.84	-0.09
Communist Party of Denmark	620	1.83	-0.21
Left Socialists	410	1.21	-0.05
Pensioners' Party	300	0.88	New
Total	33,955		

1975 Danish general election

Parties	Vote		
Parties	Votes	%	+ / -
Venstre	10,719	32.26	+10.54
Social Democrats	7,867	23.67	+4.21
Progress Party	5,266	15.85	-2.67
Christian People's Party	3,203	9.64	+1.38
Social Liberals	1,961	5.90	-4.36
Conservatives	1,123	3.38	-2.28
Centre Democrats	689	2.07	-5.06
Communist Party of Denmark	678	2.04	+0.21
Justice Party of Denmark	665	2.00	-1.76
Green Left	643	1.93	-0.58
Left Socialists	418	1.26	+0.45
Total	33,232		

1973 Danish general election

Parties	Vote		
Parties	Votes	%	+ / -
Venstre	7,219	21.72	-8.62
Social Democrats	6,466	19.46	-12.53
Progress Party	6,156	18.52	New
Social Liberals	3,410	10.26	-2.68
Christian People's Party	2,746	8.26	+2.41
Centre Democrats	2,371	7.13	New
Conservatives	1,882	5.66	-4.04
Justice Party of Denmark	1,249	3.76	+0.88
Green Left	833	2.51	-2.07
Communist Party of Denmark	609	1.83	+0.94
Left Socialists	269	0.81	-0.02
Alex Larsen	22	0.07	New
Total	33,232		

1971 Danish general election

Parties	Vote		
Parties	Votes	%	+ / -
Social Democrats	9,556	31.99	+2.46
Venstre	9,062	30.34	-6.35
Social Liberals	3,865	12.94	-0.49
Conservatives	2,896	9.70	-3.04
Christian People's Party	1,746	5.85	New
Green Left	1,368	4.58	+1.17
Justice Party of Denmark	860	2.88	+1.41
Communist Party of Denmark	267	0.89	+0.44
Left Socialists	249	0.83	-0.09
Total	29,869		

=== General elections in the 1960s ===
1968 Danish general election

Parties	Vote		
Parties	Votes	%	+ / -
Venstre	8,972	36.69	+0.25
Social Democrats	7,221	29.53	-2.90
Social Liberals	3,285	13.43	+6.47
Conservatives	3,115	12.74	+0.67
Green Left	835	3.41	-2.70
Justice Party of Denmark	360	1.47	-0.53
Left Socialists	225	0.92	New
Liberal Centre	214	0.88	-0.67
Independent Party	114	0.47	-1.57
Communist Party of Denmark	111	0.45	+0.04
Total	24,452		

1966 Danish general election

Parties	Vote		
Parties	Votes	%	+ / -
Venstre	8,361	36.44	-0.16
Social Democrats	7,441	32.43	-3.56
Conservatives	2,769	12.07	+0.45
Social Liberals	1,597	6.96	+1.64
Green Left	1,403	6.11	+3.21
Independent Party	467	2.04	-0.47
Justice Party of Denmark	459	2.00	-1.21
Liberal Centre	356	1.55	New
Communist Party of Denmark	93	0.41	0.00
Total	22,946		

1964 Danish general election

Parties	Vote		
Parties	Votes	%	+ / -
Venstre	8,097	36.60	-0.59
Social Democrats	7,963	35.99	+1.04
Conservatives	2,572	11.62	+0.74
Social Liberals	1,176	5.32	+0.09
Justice Party of Denmark	711	3.21	-2.83
Green Left	641	2.90	+0.17
Independent Party	556	2.51	+0.05
Danish Unity	187	0.85	New
Peace Politics People's Party	131	0.59	New
Communist Party of Denmark	91	0.41	-0.11
Total	22,125		

1960 Danish general election

Parties	Vote		
Parties	Votes	%	+ / -
Venstre	7,460	37.19	-4.06
Social Democrats	7,012	34.95	+4.95
Conservatives	2,183	10.88	+2.09
Justice Party of Denmark	1,211	6.04	-4.12
Social Liberals	1,050	5.23	-1.01
Green Left	547	2.73	New
Independent Party	493	2.46	+0.31
Communist Party of Denmark	105	0.52	-0.85
Total	20,061		

=== General elections in the 1950s ===
1957 Danish general election

Parties	Vote		
Parties	Votes	%	+ / -
Venstre	7,891	41.25	+1.67
Social Democrats	5,739	30.00	-2.16
Justice Party of Denmark	1,944	10.16	+2.93
Conservatives	1,682	8.79	+0.86
Social Liberals	1,193	6.24	-1.07
Independent Party	412	2.15	-1.73
Communist Party of Denmark	263	1.37	-0.53
Frede Jordan	4	0.02	New
Total	19,128		

September 1953 Danish Folketing election

Parties	Vote		
Parties	Votes	%	+ / -
Venstre	6,984	39.58	-0.09
Social Democrats	5,675	32.16	+1.00
Conservatives	1,400	7.93	-0.21
Social Liberals	1,290	7.31	-0.15
Justice Party of Denmark	1,275	7.23	-3.64
Independent Party	685	3.88	New
Communist Party of Denmark	336	1.90	-0.23
Total	17,645		

April 1953 Danish Folketing election

Parties	Vote		
Parties	Votes	%	+ / -
Venstre	6,670	39.67	-0.03
Social Democrats	5,240	31.16	+1.46
Justice Party of Denmark	1,828	10.87	-2.18
Conservatives	1,369	8.14	-1.14
Social Liberals	1,254	7.46	+1.06
Communist Party of Denmark	358	2.13	+0.26
Danish Unity	95	0.57	New
Total	16,814		

1950 Danish Folketing election

Parties	Vote		
Parties	Votes	%	+ / -
Venstre	6,809	39.70	-4.40
Social Democrats	5,093	29.70	+0.82
Justice Party of Denmark	2,239	13.05	+1.50
Conservatives	1,592	9.28	+3.42
Social Liberals	1,098	6.40	+0.66
Communist Party of Denmark	320	1.87	-1.08
Total	17,151		

=== General elections in the 1940s ===
1947 Danish Folketing election

Parties	Vote		
Parties	Votes	%	+ / -
Venstre	7,611	44.10	+1.57
Social Democrats	4,985	28.88	+3.37
Justice Party of Denmark	1,994	11.55	+5.94
Conservatives	1,011	5.86	-4.30
Social Liberals	990	5.74	-2.75
Communist Party of Denmark	510	2.95	-2.69
Danish Unity	158	0.92	-1.14
Total	17,259		

1945 Danish Folketing election

Parties	Vote		
Parties	Votes	%	+ / -
Venstre	7,161	42.53	+3.99
Social Democrats	4,295	25.51	-5.25
Conservatives	1,711	10.16	-3.03
Social Liberals	1,429	8.49	-3.03
Communist Party of Denmark	950	5.64	New
Justice Party of Denmark	944	5.61	+2.98
Danish Unity	346	2.06	+1.01
Total	16,836		

1943 Danish Folketing election

Parties	Vote		
Parties	Votes	%	+ / -
Venstre	6,517	38.54	-3.97
Social Democrats	5,202	30.76	+1.28
Conservatives	2,230	13.19	+3.44
Social Liberals	1,948	11.52	+2.28
Justice Party of Denmark	445	2.63	+0.32
Farmers' Party	243	1.44	-2.18
Danish Unity	178	1.05	+0.82
National Socialist Workers' Party of Denmark	146	0.86	-0.29
Total	16,909		

=== General elections in the 1930s ===
1939 Danish Folketing election

Parties	Vote		
Parties	Votes	%	+ / -
Venstre	5,791	42.51	+2.03
Social Democrats	4,016	29.48	+0.13
Conservatives	1,328	9.75	-2.54
Social Liberals	1,259	9.24	-1.41
Farmers' Party	493	3.62	+0.32
Justice Party of Denmark	314	2.31	-0.10
Communist Party of Denmark	173	1.27	+0.34
National Socialist Workers' Party of Denmark	157	1.15	+0.57
National Cooperation	59	0.43	New
Danish Unity	32	0.23	New
Total	13,622		

1935 Danish Folketing election

Parties	Vote		
Parties	Votes	%	+ / -
Venstre	5,403	40.48	-8.78
Social Democrats	3,917	29.35	+3.54
Conservatives	1,640	12.29	+1.49
Social Liberals	1,422	10.65	-1.16
Independent People's Party	441	3.30	New
Justice Party of Denmark	322	2.41	+0.41
Communist Party of Denmark	124	0.93	+0.75
National Socialist Workers' Party of Denmark	77	0.58	New
Total	13,346		

1932 Danish Folketing election

Parties	Vote		
Parties	Votes	%	+ / -
Venstre	6,546	49.26	-3.52
Social Democrats	3,430	25.81	+1.67
Social Liberals	1,570	11.81	-1.88
Conservatives	1,435	10.80	+2.78
Justice Party of Denmark	266	2.00	+0.75
Communist Party of Denmark	24	0.18	+0.05
Jens Frost	19	0.14	New
Total	13,290		

=== General elections in the 1920s ===
1929 Danish Folketing election

Parties	Vote		
Parties	Votes	%	+ / -
Venstre	6,710	52.78	+1.44
Social Democrats	3,069	24.14	+3.55
Social Liberals	1,740	13.69	-1.64
Conservatives	1,019	8.02	-4.18
Justice Party of Denmark	159	1.25	+0.85
Communist Party of Denmark	16	0.13	0.00
Total	12,713		

1926 Danish Folketing election

Parties	Vote		
Parties	Votes	%	+ / -
Venstre	6,120	51.34	+1.09
Social Democrats	2,455	20.59	+1.36
Social Liberals	1,828	15.33	-2.66
Conservatives	1,454	12.20	+1.82
Justice Party of Denmark	48	0.40	+0.05
Communist Party of Denmark	16	0.13	-0.10
Total	11,921		

1924 Danish Folketing election

Parties	Vote		
Parties	Votes	%	+ / -
Venstre	5,794	50.25	-2.95
Social Democrats	2,217	19.23	+3.46
Social Liberals	2,075	17.99	+0.27
Conservatives	1,197	10.38	-2.82
Farmer Party	182	1.58	New
Justice Party of Denmark	40	0.35	New
Communist Party of Denmark	26	0.23	New
Total	11,531		

September 1920 Danish Folketing election

Parties	Vote		
Parties	Votes	%	+ / -
Venstre	6,005	53.20	-0.24
Social Liberals	2,000	17.72	+1.38
Social Democrats	1,780	15.77	+3.37
Conservatives	1,490	13.20	-3.98
Danish Left Socialist Party	12	0.11	New
Total	11,287		

July 1920 Danish Folketing election

Parties	Vote		
Parties	Votes	%	+ / -
Venstre	4,547	53.44	+0.63
Conservatives	1,462	17.18	-0.14
Social Liberals	1,390	16.34	+0.20
Social Democrats	1,055	12.40	-1.22
Industry Party	47	0.55	New
S. E. W. Schmidt	7	0.08	New
Total	8,508		

April 1920 Danish Folketing election

Parties	Vote	
Parties	Votes	%
Venstre	5,246	52.81
Conservatives	1,721	17.32
Social Liberals	1,603	16.14
Social Democrats	1,353	13.62
Jens Chr. Bæch	11	0.11
Total	9,934	

== European Parliament elections results ==
2024 European Parliament election in Denmark

Parties	Vote		
Parties	Votes	%	+ / -
Venstre	4,801	19.64	-15.85
Social Democrats	4,751	19.44	-5.27
Denmark Democrats	3,974	16.26	New
Green Left	2,812	11.50	+2.63
Conservatives	1,854	7.58	+3.32
Danish People's Party	1,645	6.73	-4.31
Liberal Alliance	1,314	5.38	+3.86
Moderates	1,190	4.87	New
Social Liberals	904	3.70	-1.54
Red–Green Alliance	893	3.65	+0.27
The Alternative	305	1.25	-0.49
Total	24,443		

2019 European Parliament election in Denmark

Parties	Vote		
Parties	Votes	%	+ / -
Venstre	10,385	35.49	+16.46
Social Democrats	7,231	24.71	+2.84
Danish People's Party	3,230	11.04	-17.48
Green Left	2,596	8.87	+0.87
Social Liberals	1,533	5.24	+1.83
Conservatives	1,246	4.26	-4.83
People's Movement against the EU	1,095	3.74	-3.17
Red–Green Alliance	990	3.38	New
The Alternative	508	1.74	New
Liberal Alliance	445	1.52	-1.64
Total	29,259		

2014 European Parliament election in Denmark

Parties	Vote		
Parties	Votes	%	+ / -
Danish People's Party	6,743	28.52	+14.83
Social Democrats	5,171	21.87	-0.12
Venstre	4,499	19.03	-5.05
Conservatives	2,149	9.09	-5.52
Green Left	1,892	8.00	-5.34
People's Movement against the EU	1,633	6.91	+0.86
Social Liberals	805	3.41	+0.63
Liberal Alliance	747	3.16	+2.78
Total	23,639		

2009 European Parliament election in Denmark

Parties	Vote		
Parties	Votes	%	+ / -
Venstre	6,130	24.08	-3.03
Social Democrats	5,597	21.99	-11.31
Conservatives	3,720	14.61	+6.17
Danish People's Party	3,484	13.69	+7.41
Green Left	3,396	13.34	+8.14
People's Movement against the EU	1,539	6.05	+2.55
June Movement	787	3.09	-7.37
Social Liberals	707	2.78	-1.31
Liberal Alliance	97	0.38	New
Total	25,457		

2004 European Parliament election in Denmark

Parties	Vote		
Parties	Votes	%	+ / -
Social Democrats	6,122	33.30	+17.89
Venstre	4,984	27.11	-3.17
June Movement	1,923	10.46	-5.61
Conservatives	1,551	8.44	+2.26
Danish People's Party	1,155	6.28	+1.30
Green Left	956	5.20	-0.19
Social Liberals	752	4.09	-4.11
People's Movement against the EU	643	3.50	-2.06
Christian Democrats	298	1.62	-1.48
Total	18,384		

1999 European Parliament election in Denmark

Parties	Vote		
Parties	Votes	%	+ / -
Venstre	5,762	30.28	+4.88
June Movement	3,058	16.07	+2.62
Social Democrats	2,933	15.41	-1.29
Social Liberals	1,560	8.20	+0.12
Conservatives	1,175	6.18	-8.30
People's Movement against the EU	1,057	5.56	-3.46
Green Left	1,026	5.39	+0.02
Danish People's Party	948	4.98	New
Centre Democrats	919	4.83	+3.55
Christian Democrats	589	3.10	+0.82
Progress Party	264	1.39	-2.55
Total	19,027		

1994 European Parliament election in Denmark

Parties	Vote		
Parties	Votes	%	+ / -
Venstre	5,192	25.40	+3.31
Social Democrats	3,413	16.70	-6.85
Conservatives	2,960	14.48	+4.95
June Movement	2,749	13.45	New
People's Movement against the EU	1,843	9.02	-5.64
Social Liberals	1,652	8.08	+5.31
Green Left	1,097	5.37	-0.54
Progress Party	806	3.94	-2.67
Christian Democrats	465	2.28	-3.20
Centre Democrats	261	1.28	-8.11
Total	20,438		

1989 European Parliament election in Denmark

Parties	Vote		
Parties	Votes	%	+ / -
Social Democrats	4,009	23.55	+4.58
Venstre	3,761	22.09	+1.07
People's Movement against the EU	2,495	14.66	-0.55
Conservatives	1,622	9.53	-8.39
Centre Democrats	1,599	9.39	+2.56
Progress Party	1,126	6.61	+2.00
Green Left	1,006	5.91	-0.22
Christian Democrats	933	5.48	-0.18
Social Liberals	471	2.77	-0.44
Total	17,022		

1984 European Parliament election in Denmark

Parties	Vote	
Parties	Votes	%
Venstre	4,213	21.02
Social Democrats	3,802	18.97
Conservatives	3,593	17.92
People's Movement against the EU	3,050	15.21
Centre Democrats	1,370	6.83
Green Left	1,229	6.13
Christian Democrats	1,134	5.66
Progress Party	925	4.61
Social Liberals	643	3.21
Left Socialists	88	0.44
Total	20,047	

== Referendums ==
2022 Danish European Union opt-out referendum

Option	Votes	%
✓ YES	18,894	62.81
X NO	11,187	37.19

2015 Danish European Union opt-out referendum

Option	Votes	%
X NO	19,325	57.53
✓ YES	14,269	42.47

2014 Danish Unified Patent Court membership referendum

Option	Votes	%
✓ YES	14,487	63.05
X NO	8,489	36.95

2009 Danish Act of Succession referendum

Option	Votes	%
✓ YES	21,059	85.60
X NO	3,542	14.40

2000 Danish euro referendum

Option	Votes	%
X NO	21,926	57.82
✓ YES	15,993	42.18

1998 Danish Amsterdam Treaty referendum

Option	Votes	%
✓ YES	17,112	54.49
X NO	14,292	45.51

1993 Danish Maastricht Treaty referendum

Option	Votes	%
✓ YES	20,659	55.64
X NO	16,469	44.36

1992 Danish Maastricht Treaty referendum

Option	Votes	%
X NO	17,825	51.40
✓ YES	16,853	48.60

1986 Danish Single European Act referendum

Option	Votes	%
✓ YES	21,059	67.05
X NO	10,351	32.95

1972 Danish European Communities membership referendum

Option	Votes	%
✓ YES	15,490	73.92
X NO	5,464	26.08

1953 Danish constitutional and electoral age referendum

Option	Votes	%
✓ YES	7,870	78.36
X NO	2,174	21.64
23 years	6,007	58.70
21 years	4,227	41.30

1939 Danish constitutional referendum

Option	Votes	%
✓ YES	4,461	88.13
X NO	601	11.87
