= Thisted (nomination district) =

- Thisted
- Nomination district constituency for the Folketing
- Location of Thisted within North Jutland

- Location of North Jutland within Denmark
- Municipalities: Morsø; Thisted
- Constituency: North Jutland
- Electorate: 47,441 (2022)

Current constituency
- Created: 1849 (as constituency); 1920 (as nomination district)

Thisted nominating district is one of the 92 nominating districts that exists for Danish elections following the 2007 municipal reform. It consists of Morsø and Thisted municipality. It was created in 1849 as a constituency, and has been a nomination district since 1920, though its boundaries have been changed since then.

While parties of the often nicknamed blue bloc has received more votes than the red bloc in all the general elections, the Social Democrats has won the most votes in the district since the 2011 Danish general election.

== General elections results ==
=== General elections in the 2020s ===
2022 Danish general election

Parties	Vote		
Parties	Votes	%	+ / -
Social Democrats	13,532	34.28	-1.06
Denmark Democrats	7,586	19.21	New
Venstre	6,479	16.41	-13.22
Liberal Alliance	2,188	5.54	+4.22
Moderates	2,111	5.35	New
Conservatives	1,574	3.99	-1.46
Green Left	1,547	3.92	+0.14
New Right	1,275	3.23	+1.74
Red–Green Alliance	899	2.28	-1.37
Danish People's Party	800	2.03	-8.00
The Alternative	698	1.77	+0.23
Social Liberals	458	1.16	-2.24
Christian Democrats	270	0.68	-1.53
Independent Greens	44	0.11	New
Jette Møller	19	0.05	New
Total	39,480		

=== General elections in the 2010s ===
2019 Danish general election

Parties	Vote		
Parties	Votes	%	+ / -
Social Democrats	14,210	35.34	+3.41
Venstre	11,914	29.63	+2.04
Danish People's Party	4,035	10.03	-11.70
Conservatives	2,190	5.45	+3.04
Green Left	1,521	3.78	+1.78
Red–Green Alliance	1,467	3.65	-1.21
Social Liberals	1,366	3.40	+1.58
Christian Democrats	890	2.21	+1.02
The Alternative	618	1.54	-0.69
New Right	600	1.49	New
Stram Kurs	599	1.49	New
Liberal Alliance	532	1.32	-2.92
Klaus Riskær Pedersen Party	270	0.67	New
Total	40,212		

2015 Danish general election

Parties	Vote		
Parties	Votes	%	+ / -
Social Democrats	13,310	31.93	+1.04
Venstre	11,503	27.59	-2.96
Danish People's Party	9,061	21.73	+8.17
Red–Green Alliance	2,025	4.86	+1.19
Liberal Alliance	1,766	4.24	+0.88
Conservatives	1,003	2.41	-2.21
The Alternative	931	2.23	New
Green Left	833	2.00	-4.28
Social Liberals	758	1.82	-3.88
Christian Democrats	495	1.19	-0.14
Hans Schultz	4	0.01	-0.02
Total	41,689		

2011 Danish general election

Parties	Vote		
Parties	Votes	%	+ / -
Social Democrats	13,303	30.89	+4.20
Venstre	13,158	30.55	-0.46
Danish People's Party	5,839	13.56	-0.63
Green Left	2,704	6.28	-2.93
Social Liberals	2,454	5.70	+1.85
Conservatives	1,991	4.62	-6.37
Red–Green Alliance	1,582	3.67	+2.74
Liberal Alliance	1,448	3.36	+1.86
Christian Democrats	573	1.33	-0.28
Hans Schultz	12	0.03	+0.03
Total	43,064		

=== General elections in the 2000s ===
2007 Danish general election

Parties	Vote		
Parties	Votes	%	+ / -
Venstre	13,422	31.01	-4.63
Social Democrats	11,552	26.69	-0.43
Danish People's Party	6,140	14.19	+1.08
Conservatives	4,756	10.99	+3.05
Green Left	3,987	9.21	+4.51
Social Liberals	1,665	3.85	-1.56
Christian Democrats	698	1.61	-1.84
New Alliance	648	1.50	New
Red–Green Alliance	401	0.93	-0.82
Anders Gravers Pedersen	7	0.02	New
Hans Schultz	2	0.00	New
Total	43,278		

2005 Danish general election

Parties	Vote		
Parties	Votes	%	+ / -
Venstre	10,235	35.64	+1.07
Social Democrats	7,789	27.12	-1.71
Danish People's Party	3,766	13.11	+1.27
Conservatives	2,280	7.94	-0.74
Social Liberals	1,553	5.41	+2.28
Green Left	1,350	4.70	+0.54
Christian Democrats	991	3.45	-0.94
Red–Green Alliance	503	1.75	+0.35
Centre Democrats	206	0.72	-0.40
Minority Party	45	0.16	New
Total	28,718		

2001 Danish general election

Parties	Vote		
Parties	Votes	%	+ / -
Venstre	10,289	34.57	+6.25
Social Democrats	8,582	28.83	-4.27
Danish People's Party	3,524	11.84	+5.04
Conservatives	2,585	8.68	+0.04
Christian People's Party	1,306	4.39	-1.34
Green Left	1,238	4.16	-0.87
Social Liberals	932	3.13	-0.22
Progress Party	560	1.88	-1.91
Red–Green Alliance	417	1.40	+0.05
Centre Democrats	332	1.12	-2.40
Total	29,765		

=== General elections in the 1990s ===
1998 Danish general election

Parties	Vote		
Parties	Votes	%	+ / -
Social Democrats	9,954	33.10	+1.61
Venstre	8,519	28.32	+1.03
Conservatives	2,600	8.64	-6.29
Danish People's Party	2,045	6.80	New
Christian People's Party	1,723	5.73	+1.07
Green Left	1,512	5.03	+0.98
Progress Party	1,139	3.79	-6.43
Centre Democrats	1,059	3.52	+1.39
Social Liberals	1,008	3.35	-0.23
Red–Green Alliance	407	1.35	-0.30
Democratic Renewal	110	0.37	New
Total	30,076		

1994 Danish general election

Parties	Vote		
Parties	Votes	%	+ / -
Social Democrats	9,417	31.49	-1.52
Venstre	8,162	27.29	+7.70
Conservatives	4,466	14.93	-1.40
Progress Party	3,057	10.22	-1.24
Christian People's Party	1,393	4.66	-1.89
Green Left	1,212	4.05	-0.41
Social Liberals	1,071	3.58	+1.14
Centre Democrats	638	2.13	-1.15
Red–Green Alliance	492	1.65	+0.91
Total	29,908		

1990 Danish general election

Parties	Vote		
Parties	Votes	%	+ / -
Social Democrats	9,748	33.01	+5.84
Venstre	5,786	19.59	+1.77
Conservatives	4,821	16.33	-3.66
Progress Party	3,383	11.46	-1.02
Christian People's Party	1,934	6.55	+0.28
Green Left	1,317	4.46	-1.86
Centre Democrats	968	3.28	-0.01
Social Liberals	720	2.44	-1.60
Common Course	327	1.11	-0.17
Red–Green Alliance	218	0.74	New
Justice Party of Denmark	193	0.65	New
The Greens	113	0.38	-0.39
Humanist Party	2	0.01	New
Total	29,530		

=== General elections in the 1980s ===
1988 Danish general election

Parties	Vote		
Parties	Votes	%	+ / -
Social Democrats	8,385	27.17	+0.38
Conservatives	6,169	19.99	-2.62
Venstre	5,499	17.82	+1.02
Progress Party	3,852	12.48	+5.35
Green Left	1,950	6.32	-1.36
Christian People's Party	1,934	6.27	-0.67
Social Liberals	1,246	4.04	-0.43
Centre Democrats	1,015	3.29	-0.68
Common Course	394	1.28	+0.04
The Greens	238	0.77	-0.06
Communist Party of Denmark	94	0.30	-0.07
Left Socialists	66	0.21	-0.20
Jan Møgelbjerg	13	0.04	New
Ronald Hansen	5	0.02	New
Total	30,860		

1987 Danish general election

Parties	Vote		
Parties	Votes	%	+ / -
Social Democrats	8,308	26.79	+1.12
Conservatives	7,011	22.61	-0.23
Venstre	5,211	16.80	-4.71
Green Left	2,383	7.68	+2.52
Progress Party	2,211	7.13	+2.08
Christian People's Party	2,151	6.94	-1.37
Social Liberals	1,385	4.47	+0.52
Centre Democrats	1,232	3.97	-0.71
Common Course	385	1.24	New
The Greens	256	0.83	New
Justice Party of Denmark	179	0.58	-0.85
Left Socialists	126	0.41	-0.67
Communist Party of Denmark	116	0.37	+0.10
Humanist Party	43	0.14	New
Marxist–Leninists Party	7	0.02	+0.01
Socialist Workers Party	5	0.02	0.00
Total	31,009		

1984 Danish general election

Parties	Vote		
Parties	Votes	%	+ / -
Social Democrats	8,065	25.67	-1.06
Conservatives	7,176	22.84	+8.44
Venstre	6,757	21.51	+1.94
Christian People's Party	2,610	8.31	+0.60
Green Left	1,620	5.16	+0.02
Progress Party	1,587	5.05	-7.45
Centre Democrats	1,471	4.68	-3.18
Social Liberals	1,242	3.95	+0.44
Justice Party of Denmark	449	1.43	+0.21
Left Socialists	340	1.08	+0.25
Communist Party of Denmark	85	0.27	-0.16
Socialist Workers Party	6	0.02	-0.01
Marxist–Leninists Party	4	0.01	New
Total	31,412		

1981 Danish general election

Parties	Vote		
Parties	Votes	%	+ / -
Social Democrats	7,718	26.73	-1.44
Venstre	5,652	19.57	+0.14
Conservatives	4,158	14.40	+0.53
Progress Party	3,609	12.50	-2.81
Centre Democrats	2,269	7.86	+4.44
Christian People's Party	2,228	7.71	-0.73
Green Left	1,484	5.14	+2.33
Social Liberals	1,014	3.51	-0.43
Justice Party of Denmark	353	1.22	-1.09
Left Socialists	241	0.83	-0.56
Communist Party of Denmark	123	0.43	-0.27
Communist Workers Party	21	0.07	-0.12
Socialist Workers Party	9	0.03	New
Total	28,879		

=== General elections in the 1970s ===
1979 Danish general election

Parties	Vote		
Parties	Votes	%	+ / -
Social Democrats	8,388	28.17	+1.80
Venstre	5,786	19.43	-0.74
Progress Party	4,559	15.31	-2.79
Conservatives	4,131	13.87	+3.21
Christian People's Party	2,513	8.44	-1.77
Social Liberals	1,174	3.94	+1.54
Centre Democrats	1,018	3.42	-1.55
Green Left	836	2.81	+1.36
Justice Party of Denmark	688	2.31	-0.57
Left Socialists	415	1.39	+0.52
Communist Party of Denmark	207	0.70	-0.58
Communist Workers Party	58	0.19	New
Total	29,773		

1977 Danish general election

Parties	Vote		
Parties	Votes	%	+ / -
Social Democrats	7,522	26.37	+5.52
Venstre	5,755	20.17	-9.86
Progress Party	5,164	18.10	+1.70
Conservatives	3,041	10.66	+2.09
Christian People's Party	2,912	10.21	-2.32
Centre Democrats	1,419	4.97	+3.36
Justice Party of Denmark	822	2.88	+0.92
Social Liberals	684	2.40	-2.21
Green Left	414	1.45	-0.02
Communist Party of Denmark	364	1.28	0.00
Left Socialists	247	0.87	+0.18
Pensioners' Party	183	0.64	New
Total	28,527		

1975 Danish general election

Parties	Vote		
Parties	Votes	%	+ / -
Venstre	8,462	30.03	+12.48
Social Democrats	5,875	20.85	+2.61
Progress Party	4,622	16.40	-1.50
Christian People's Party	3,532	12.53	+0.39
Conservatives	2,415	8.57	-4.26
Social Liberals	1,300	4.61	-4.93
Justice Party of Denmark	551	1.96	-1.22
Centre Democrats	454	1.61	-3.76
Green Left	415	1.47	-0.40
Communist Party of Denmark	362	1.28	+0.40
Left Socialists	195	0.69	+0.18
Total	28,183		

1973 Danish general election

Parties	Vote		
Parties	Votes	%	+ / -
Social Democrats	5,075	18.24	-10.05
Progress Party	4,980	17.90	New
Venstre	4,884	17.55	-10.65
Conservatives	3,570	12.83	-5.96
Christian People's Party	3,379	12.14	+4.87
Social Liberals	2,654	9.54	-0.56
Centre Democrats	1,494	5.37	New
Justice Party of Denmark	885	3.18	+0.10
Green Left	520	1.87	-1.43
Communist Party of Denmark	245	0.88	+0.37
Left Socialists	141	0.51	+0.04
Total	27,827		

1971 Danish general election

Parties	Vote		
Parties	Votes	%	+ / -
Social Democrats	7,471	28.29	-1.76
Venstre	7,447	28.20	-5.45
Conservatives	4,962	18.79	-0.95
Social Liberals	2,667	10.10	-1.20
Christian People's Party	1,921	7.27	New
Green Left	872	3.30	+1.57
Justice Party of Denmark	813	3.08	+1.83
Communist Party of Denmark	134	0.51	+0.31
Left Socialists	123	0.47	-0.13
Total	26,410		

=== General elections in the 1960s ===
1968 Danish general election

Parties	Vote		
Parties	Votes	%	+ / -
Venstre	6,211	33.65	-0.11
Social Democrats	5,547	30.05	-3.81
Conservatives	3,643	19.74	+0.16
Social Liberals	2,085	11.30	+6.47
Green Left	320	1.73	-1.35
Justice Party of Denmark	231	1.25	-0.08
Liberal Centre	158	0.86	-0.71
Independent Party	115	0.62	-1.20
Left Socialists	111	0.60	New
Communist Party of Denmark	37	0.20	+0.03
Total	18,458		

1966 Danish general election

Parties	Vote		
Parties	Votes	%	+ / -
Social Democrats	6,083	33.86	-0.38
Venstre	6,065	33.76	+0.62
Conservatives	3,518	19.58	-1.34
Social Liberals	868	4.83	+1.90
Green Left	553	3.08	+1.61
Independent Party	327	1.82	-1.17
Liberal Centre	282	1.57	New
Justice Party of Denmark	239	1.33	-1.44
Communist Party of Denmark	31	0.17	-0.16
Total	17,966		

1964 Danish general election

Parties	Vote		
Parties	Votes	%	+ / -
Social Democrats	5,763	34.24	+1.74
Venstre	5,578	33.14	-3.76
Conservatives	3,522	20.92	+1.88
Independent Party	504	2.99	+0.13
Social Liberals	493	2.93	+0.18
Justice Party of Denmark	467	2.77	-1.61
Green Left	247	1.47	+0.12
Danish Unity	119	0.71	New
Peace Politics People's Party	84	0.50	New
Communist Party of Denmark	56	0.33	+0.10
Total	16,833		

1960 Danish general election

Parties	Vote		
Parties	Votes	%	+ / -
Venstre	5,894	36.90	-7.54
Social Democrats	5,191	32.50	+5.45
Conservatives	3,041	19.04	+1.70
Justice Party of Denmark	700	4.38	-1.83
Independent Party	457	2.86	+1.31
Social Liberals	439	2.75	-0.21
Green Left	216	1.35	New
Communist Party of Denmark	36	0.23	-0.22
Total	15,974		

=== General elections in the 1950s ===
1957 Danish general election

Parties	Vote		
Parties	Votes	%	+ / -
Venstre	7,002	44.44	+2.80
Social Democrats	4,263	27.05	-1.41
Conservatives	2,732	17.34	-2.92
Justice Party of Denmark	978	6.21	+2.15
Social Liberals	467	2.96	+0.39
Independent Party	244	1.55	-0.74
Communist Party of Denmark	71	0.45	-0.26
Total	15,757		

September 1953 Danish Folketing election

Parties	Vote		
Parties	Votes	%	+ / -
Venstre	6,301	41.64	+0.93
Social Democrats	4,307	28.46	+0.41
Conservatives	3,066	20.26	-0.72
Justice Party of Denmark	614	4.06	-1.94
Social Liberals	389	2.57	-0.48
Independent Party	346	2.29	New
Communist Party of Denmark	108	0.71	-0.11
Total	15,131		

April 1953 Danish Folketing election

Parties	Vote		
Parties	Votes	%	+ / -
Venstre	5,867	40.71	+1.54
Social Democrats	4,042	28.05	+0.24
Conservatives	3,024	20.98	-2.21
Justice Party of Denmark	864	6.00	-0.64
Social Liberals	440	3.05	+0.57
Communist Party of Denmark	118	0.82	+0.10
Danish Unity	56	0.39	New
Total	14,411		

1950 Danish Folketing election

Parties	Vote		
Parties	Votes	%	+ / -
Venstre	5,858	39.17	-5.75
Social Democrats	4,159	27.81	+0.49
Conservatives	3,468	23.19	+2.82
Justice Party of Denmark	993	6.64	+3.45
Social Liberals	371	2.48	+0.29
Communist Party of Denmark	108	0.72	-0.65
Total	14,957		

=== General elections in the 1940s ===
1947 Danish Folketing election

Parties	Vote		
Parties	Votes	%	+ / -
Venstre	6,846	44.92	+0.24
Social Democrats	4,163	27.32	+3.56
Conservatives	3,104	20.37	-1.62
Justice Party of Denmark	486	3.19	+1.44
Social Liberals	333	2.19	-0.83
Communist Party of Denmark	209	1.37	-2.03
Danish Unity	98	0.64	-0.77
Total	15,239		

1945 Danish Folketing election

Parties	Vote		
Parties	Votes	%	+ / -
Venstre	6,677	44.68	+9.41
Social Democrats	3,551	23.76	-4.49
Conservatives	3,287	21.99	-5.71
Communist Party of Denmark	508	3.40	New
Social Liberals	451	3.02	-0.26
Justice Party of Denmark	261	1.75	+0.26
Danish Unity	210	1.41	+0.27
Total	14,945		

1943 Danish Folketing election

Parties	Vote		
Parties	Votes	%	+ / -
Venstre	5,391	35.27	-1.03
Social Democrats	4,317	28.25	+2.85
Conservatives	4,234	27.70	+1.80
Social Liberals	501	3.28	-0.95
Farmers' Party	291	1.90	-2.40
Justice Party of Denmark	228	1.49	-0.51
Danish Unity	174	1.14	+1.03
National Socialist Workers' Party of Denmark	147	0.96	+0.24
Total	15,283		

=== General elections in the 1930s ===
1939 Danish Folketing election

Parties	Vote		
Parties	Votes	%	+ / -
Venstre	4,529	36.30	+0.72
Conservatives	3,231	25.90	-1.50
Social Democrats	3,169	25.40	-1.21
Farmers' Party	537	4.30	+1.35
Social Liberals	528	4.23	+0.66
Justice Party of Denmark	250	2.00	-1.03
National Socialist Workers' Party of Denmark	90	0.72	-0.14
Communist Party of Denmark	85	0.68	New
National Cooperation	42	0.34	New
Danish Unity	14	0.11	New
Total	12,475		

1935 Danish Folketing election

Parties	Vote		
Parties	Votes	%	+ / -
Venstre	4,410	35.58	-6.48
Conservatives	3,397	27.40	-1.55
Social Democrats	3,298	26.61	+3.66
Social Liberals	443	3.57	+0.05
Justice Party of Denmark	375	3.03	+0.51
Independent People's Party	366	2.95	New
National Socialist Workers' Party of Denmark	107	0.86	New
Total	12,396		

1932 Danish Folketing election

Parties	Vote		
Parties	Votes	%	+ / -
Venstre	5,321	42.06	-2.73
Conservatives	3,663	28.95	-0.26
Social Democrats	2,904	22.95	+0.90
Social Liberals	445	3.52	+0.50
Justice Party of Denmark	319	2.52	+1.60
Total	12,652		

=== General elections in the 1920s ===
1929 Danish Folketing election

Parties	Vote		
Parties	Votes	%	+ / -
Venstre	5,242	44.79	+1.34
Conservatives	3,418	29.21	-5.35
Social Democrats	2,581	22.05	+4.25
Social Liberals	354	3.02	-0.72
Justice Party of Denmark	108	0.92	+0.47
Total	11,703		

1926 Danish Folketing election

Parties	Vote		
Parties	Votes	%	+ / -
Venstre	4,732	43.45	+2.49
Conservatives	3,764	34.56	-0.01
Social Democrats	1,939	17.80	-0.56
Social Liberals	407	3.74	+0.28
Justice Party of Denmark	49	0.45	-0.24
Total	10,891		

1924 Danish Folketing election

Parties	Vote		
Parties	Votes	%	+ / -
Venstre	4,144	40.96	-4.61
Conservatives	3,497	34.57	-2.76
Social Democrats	1,857	18.36	+6.36
Social Liberals	350	3.46	-0.09
Farmer Party	198	1.96	New
Justice Party of Denmark	70	0.69	New
Total	10,116		

September 1920 Danish Folketing election

Parties	Vote		
Parties	Votes	%	+ / -
Venstre	4,498	45.57	-1.56
Conservatives	3,684	37.33	-1.08
Social Democrats	1,184	12.00	+1.77
Social Liberals	350	3.55	+0.24
Industry Party	141	1.43	+0.50
Danish Left Socialist Party	13	0.13	New
Total	9,870		

July 1920 Danish Folketing election

Parties	Vote		
Parties	Votes	%	+ / -
Venstre	4,021	47.13	+0.32
Conservatives	3,277	38.41	-0.21
Social Democrats	873	10.23	-0.77
Social Liberals	282	3.31	+0.11
Industry Party	79	0.93	+0.56
Total	8,532		

April 1920 Danish Folketing election

Parties	Vote	
Parties	Votes	%
Venstre	4,217	46.81
Conservatives	3,479	38.62
Social Democrats	991	11.11
Social Liberals	288	3.20
Industry Party	33	0.37
Total	9,008	

== European Parliament elections results ==
2024 European Parliament election in Denmark

Parties	Vote		
Parties	Votes	%	+ / -
Venstre	4,955	20.06	-21.61
Denmark Democrats	4,837	19.58	New
Social Democrats	4,398	17.81	-4.97
Green Left	2,833	11.47	+3.54
Danish People's Party	1,642	6.65	-3.59
Conservatives	1,492	6.04	+2.62
Liberal Alliance	1,397	5.66	+4.41
Moderates	1,079	4.37	New
Red–Green Alliance	863	3.49	+0.46
Social Liberals	809	3.28	-1.41
The Alternative	395	1.60	-0.18
Total	24,700		

2019 European Parliament election in Denmark

Parties	Vote		
Parties	Votes	%	+ / -
Venstre	12,687	41.67	+19.00
Social Democrats	6,937	22.78	+3.39
Danish People's Party	3,117	10.24	-19.92
Green Left	2,414	7.93	+0.63
Social Liberals	1,428	4.69	+1.75
Conservatives	1,042	3.42	-5.68
People's Movement against the EU	973	3.20	-2.94
Red–Green Alliance	924	3.03	New
The Alternative	542	1.78	New
Liberal Alliance	382	1.25	-1.05
Total	30,446		

2014 European Parliament election in Denmark

Parties	Vote		
Parties	Votes	%	+ / -
Danish People's Party	7,814	30.16	+15.45
Venstre	5,873	22.67	-2.93
Social Democrats	5,023	19.39	-1.50
Conservatives	2,359	9.10	-6.40
Green Left	1,891	7.30	-5.24
People's Movement against the EU	1,591	6.14	+0.41
Social Liberals	763	2.94	+0.41
Liberal Alliance	595	2.30	+2.05
Total	25,909		

2009 European Parliament election in Denmark

Parties	Vote		
Parties	Votes	%	+ / -
Venstre	6,933	25.60	-1.22
Social Democrats	5,658	20.89	-10.74
Conservatives	4,197	15.50	+5.35
Danish People's Party	3,983	14.71	+7.91
Green Left	3,397	12.54	+7.37
People's Movement against the EU	1,553	5.73	+1.74
Social Liberals	684	2.53	-1.48
June Movement	608	2.25	-6.38
Liberal Alliance	69	0.25	New
Total	27,082		

2004 European Parliament election in Denmark

Parties	Vote		
Parties	Votes	%	+ / -
Social Democrats	4,704	31.63	+18.20
Venstre	3,988	26.82	-0.86
Conservatives	1,509	10.15	+0.35
June Movement	1,283	8.63	-8.30
Danish People's Party	1,011	6.80	+1.28
Green Left	769	5.17	-0.60
Social Liberals	596	4.01	-3.19
People's Movement against the EU	593	3.99	-1.89
Christian Democrats	417	2.80	-2.08
Total	14,870		

1999 European Parliament election in Denmark

Parties	Vote		
Parties	Votes	%	+ / -
Venstre	4,035	27.68	+5.44
June Movement	2,468	16.93	+3.41
Social Democrats	1,958	13.43	-0.61
Conservatives	1,429	9.80	-9.65
Social Liberals	1,050	7.20	-0.56
People's Movement against the EU	857	5.88	-2.61
Green Left	841	5.77	+0.24
Danish People's Party	804	5.52	New
Christian Democrats	712	4.88	+1.79
Centre Democrats	424	2.91	+2.20
Progress Party	363	2.49	-2.67
Total	14,578		

1994 European Parliament election in Denmark

Parties	Vote		
Parties	Votes	%	+ / -
Venstre	3,662	22.24	-5.26
Conservatives	3,203	19.45	+7.56
Social Democrats	2,312	14.04	-4.58
June Movement	2,227	13.52	New
People's Movement against the EU	1,398	8.49	-5.76
Social Liberals	1,277	7.76	+4.84
Green Left	911	5.53	+1.12
Progress Party	850	5.16	-1.31
Christian Democrats	509	3.09	-4.84
Centre Democrats	117	0.71	-5.30
Total	16,466		

1989 European Parliament election in Denmark

Parties	Vote		
Parties	Votes	%	+ / -
Venstre	4,126	27.50	-7.45
Social Democrats	2,794	18.62	+4.25
People's Movement against the EU	2,138	14.25	+0.76
Conservatives	1,783	11.89	-3.79
Christian Democrats	1,190	7.93	+0.53
Progress Party	970	6.47	+2.49
Centre Democrats	902	6.01	+1.00
Green Left	661	4.41	+0.02
Social Liberals	438	2.92	+2.68
Total	15,002		

1984 European Parliament election in Denmark

Parties	Vote	
Parties	Votes	%
Venstre	6,005	34.95
Conservatives	2,693	15.68
Social Democrats	2,469	14.37
People's Movement against the EU	2,317	13.49
Christian Democrats	1,271	7.40
Centre Democrats	861	5.01
Green Left	755	4.39
Progress Party	683	3.98
Left Socialists	84	0.49
Social Liberals	42	0.24
Total	17,180	

== Referendums ==
2022 Danish European Union opt-out referendum

Option	Votes	%
✓ YES	18,481	62.33
X NO	11,168	37.67

2015 Danish European Union opt-out referendum

Option	Votes	%
X NO	18,845	55.41
✓ YES	15,167	44.59

2014 Danish Unified Patent Court membership referendum

Option	Votes	%
✓ YES	15,613	62.32
X NO	9,440	37.68

2009 Danish Act of Succession referendum

Option	Votes	%
✓ YES	22,597	86.63
X NO	3,489	13.37

2000 Danish euro referendum

Option	Votes	%
X NO	16,808	56.24
✓ YES	13,076	43.76

1998 Danish Amsterdam Treaty referendum

Option	Votes	%
✓ YES	13,829	54.10
X NO	11,731	45.90

1993 Danish Maastricht Treaty referendum

Option	Votes	%
✓ YES	16,276	54.62
X NO	13,520	45.38

1992 Danish Maastricht Treaty referendum

Option	Votes	%
X NO	15,441	53.79
✓ YES	13,265	46.21

1986 Danish Single European Act referendum

Option	Votes	%
✓ YES	18,077	68.89
X NO	8,165	31.11

1972 Danish European Communities membership referendum

Option	Votes	%
✓ YES	19,829	72.03
X NO	7,699	27.97

1953 Danish constitutional and electoral age referendum

Option	Votes	%
✓ YES	6,674	79.62
X NO	1,708	20.38
23 years	5,686	66.67
21 years	2,843	33.33

1939 Danish constitutional referendum

Option	Votes	%
✓ YES	4,406	87.75
X NO	615	12.25
