= Skive (nomination district) =

Nominating district in Denmark

- Skive
- Nomination district constituency for the Folketing
- Location of Skive within West Jutland

- Location of West Jutland within Denmark
- Municipalities: Skive
- Constituency: West Jutland
- Electorate: 34,512 (2022)

Current constituency
- Created: 1849 (as constituency); 1920 (as nomination district)

Skive nominating district is one of the 92 nominating districts that exists for Danish elections following the 2007 municipal reform. It consists of Skive municipality. It was created in 1849 as a constituency, and has been a nomination district since 1920, though its boundaries have been changed since then.

In general elections, parties commonly associated with the blue bloc has always obtained most votes in the district.

== General elections results ==
=== General elections in the 2020s ===
2022 Danish general election

| Parties | Vote | | |
| Parties | Votes | % | + / - |
|---|---|---|---|
| Social Democrats | 8,868 | 31.10 | +0.92 |
| Denmark Democrats | 6,142 | 21.54 | New |
| Venstre | 3,952 | 13.86 | -18.61 |
| Liberal Alliance | 1,802 | 6.32 | +4.82 |
| Green Left | 1,783 | 6.25 | +0.54 |
| Conservatives | 1,604 | 5.62 | -0.25 |
| Moderates | 1,489 | 5.22 | New |
| New Right | 838 | 2.94 | +1.13 |
| Danish People's Party | 579 | 2.03 | -5.65 |
| Red–Green Alliance | 516 | 1.81 | -1.49 |
| Social Liberals | 378 | 1.33 | -4.88 |
| The Alternative | 284 | 1.00 | -0.11 |
| Christian Democrats | 199 | 0.70 | -1.03 |
| Independent Greens | 59 | 0.21 | New |
| Karen Predbjørn Klarbæk | 25 | 0.09 | New |
| Total | 28,518 | | |

=== General elections in the 2010s ===
2019 Danish general election

| Parties | Vote | | |
| Parties | Votes | % | + / - |
|---|---|---|---|
| Venstre | 9,555 | 32.47 | +5.53 |
| Social Democrats | 8,879 | 30.18 | -0.27 |
| Danish People's Party | 2,261 | 7.68 | -13.07 |
| Social Liberals | 1,826 | 6.21 | +3.15 |
| Conservatives | 1,728 | 5.87 | +2.90 |
| Green Left | 1,681 | 5.71 | +2.84 |
| Red–Green Alliance | 971 | 3.30 | -1.79 |
| Stram Kurs | 565 | 1.92 | New |
| New Right | 533 | 1.81 | New |
| Christian Democrats | 508 | 1.73 | +0.93 |
| Liberal Alliance | 442 | 1.50 | -3.39 |
| The Alternative | 328 | 1.11 | -1.03 |
| Klaus Riskær Pedersen Party | 148 | 0.50 | New |
| Total | 29,425 | | |

2015 Danish general election

| Parties | Vote | | |
| Parties | Votes | % | + / - |
|---|---|---|---|
| Social Democrats | 9,164 | 30.45 | +1.36 |
| Venstre | 8,106 | 26.94 | -4.20 |
| Danish People's Party | 6,245 | 20.75 | +8.37 |
| Red–Green Alliance | 1,531 | 5.09 | +1.34 |
| Liberal Alliance | 1,472 | 4.89 | +0.65 |
| Social Liberals | 922 | 3.06 | -4.26 |
| Conservatives | 893 | 2.97 | +0.39 |
| Green Left | 864 | 2.87 | -5.78 |
| The Alternative | 644 | 2.14 | New |
| Christian Democrats | 242 | 0.80 | -0.03 |
| Erik Sputnik | 9 | 0.03 | New |
| Total | 30,092 | | |

2011 Danish general election

| Parties | Vote | | |
| Parties | Votes | % | + / - |
|---|---|---|---|
| Venstre | 9,701 | 31.14 | -4.07 |
| Social Democrats | 9,064 | 29.09 | +0.88 |
| Danish People's Party | 3,856 | 12.38 | -0.81 |
| Green Left | 2,696 | 8.65 | -1.44 |
| Social Liberals | 2,281 | 7.32 | +2.69 |
| Liberal Alliance | 1,322 | 4.24 | +2.81 |
| Red–Green Alliance | 1,168 | 3.75 | +2.90 |
| Conservatives | 803 | 2.58 | -2.79 |
| Christian Democrats | 259 | 0.83 | -0.18 |
| Rikke Cramer Christiansen | 7 | 0.02 | New |
| Ejgil Kølbæk | 0 | 0.00 | -0.01 |
| Total | 31,157 | | |

=== General elections in the 2000s ===
2007 Danish general election

| Parties | Vote | | |
| Parties | Votes | % | + / - |
|---|---|---|---|
| Venstre | 10,883 | 35.21 | -1.26 |
| Social Democrats | 8,721 | 28.21 | +0.23 |
| Danish People's Party | 4,078 | 13.19 | +0.34 |
| Green Left | 3,120 | 10.09 | +4.82 |
| Conservatives | 1,660 | 5.37 | -1.33 |
| Social Liberals | 1,431 | 4.63 | -2.55 |
| New Alliance | 443 | 1.43 | New |
| Christian Democrats | 311 | 1.01 | -0.46 |
| Red–Green Alliance | 262 | 0.85 | -0.40 |
| Ejgil Kølbæk | 2 | 0.01 | New |
| Total | 30,911 | | |

2005 Danish general election

| Parties | Vote | | |
| Parties | Votes | % | + / - |
|---|---|---|---|
| Venstre | 12,923 | 36.47 | +2.73 |
| Social Democrats | 9,913 | 27.98 | -3.15 |
| Danish People's Party | 4,552 | 12.85 | +0.46 |
| Social Liberals | 2,546 | 7.18 | +1.68 |
| Conservatives | 2,373 | 6.70 | -1.00 |
| Green Left | 1,869 | 5.27 | +0.81 |
| Christian Democrats | 520 | 1.47 | -0.77 |
| Red–Green Alliance | 442 | 1.25 | +0.39 |
| Centre Democrats | 253 | 0.71 | -0.37 |
| Minority Party | 44 | 0.12 | New |
| Total | 35,435 | | |

2001 Danish general election

| Parties | Vote | | |
| Parties | Votes | % | + / - |
|---|---|---|---|
| Venstre | 12,391 | 33.74 | +7.19 |
| Social Democrats | 11,432 | 31.13 | -5.90 |
| Danish People's Party | 4,548 | 12.39 | +5.13 |
| Conservatives | 2,826 | 7.70 | +0.40 |
| Social Liberals | 2,021 | 5.50 | -1.51 |
| Green Left | 1,637 | 4.46 | -0.65 |
| Christian People's Party | 823 | 2.24 | -0.44 |
| Centre Democrats | 395 | 1.08 | -2.47 |
| Progress Party | 331 | 0.90 | -1.28 |
| Red–Green Alliance | 316 | 0.86 | -0.18 |
| Total | 36,720 | | |

=== General elections in the 1990s ===
1998 Danish general election

| Parties | Vote | | |
| Parties | Votes | % | + / - |
|---|---|---|---|
| Social Democrats | 13,487 | 37.03 | +0.78 |
| Venstre | 9,671 | 26.55 | +0.73 |
| Conservatives | 2,657 | 7.30 | -6.75 |
| Danish People's Party | 2,643 | 7.26 | New |
| Social Liberals | 2,554 | 7.01 | +0.50 |
| Green Left | 1,860 | 5.11 | -0.12 |
| Centre Democrats | 1,293 | 3.55 | +1.73 |
| Christian People's Party | 977 | 2.68 | +0.86 |
| Progress Party | 794 | 2.18 | -4.97 |
| Red–Green Alliance | 377 | 1.04 | -0.31 |
| Democratic Renewal | 106 | 0.29 | New |
| Total | 36,419 | | |

1994 Danish general election

| Parties | Vote | | |
| Parties | Votes | % | + / - |
|---|---|---|---|
| Social Democrats | 13,021 | 36.25 | -1.09 |
| Venstre | 9,275 | 25.82 | +7.57 |
| Conservatives | 5,046 | 14.05 | -1.01 |
| Progress Party | 2,570 | 7.15 | -1.60 |
| Social Liberals | 2,338 | 6.51 | -0.17 |
| Green Left | 1,880 | 5.23 | -0.47 |
| Christian People's Party | 653 | 1.82 | -0.74 |
| Centre Democrats | 652 | 1.82 | -1.58 |
| Red–Green Alliance | 486 | 1.35 | +0.88 |
| Total | 35,921 | | |

1990 Danish general election

| Parties | Vote | | |
| Parties | Votes | % | + / - |
|---|---|---|---|
| Social Democrats | 13,151 | 37.34 | +6.95 |
| Venstre | 6,425 | 18.25 | +2.96 |
| Conservatives | 5,303 | 15.06 | -2.25 |
| Progress Party | 3,081 | 8.75 | -1.89 |
| Social Liberals | 2,351 | 6.68 | -2.53 |
| Green Left | 2,007 | 5.70 | -2.78 |
| Centre Democrats | 1,197 | 3.40 | -0.21 |
| Christian People's Party | 903 | 2.56 | +0.22 |
| Common Course | 365 | 1.04 | -0.38 |
| Red–Green Alliance | 167 | 0.47 | New |
| Justice Party of Denmark | 131 | 0.37 | New |
| The Greens | 123 | 0.35 | -0.32 |
| Humanist Party | 11 | 0.03 | New |
| Total | 35,215 | | |

=== General elections in the 1980s ===
1988 Danish general election

| Parties | Vote | | |
| Parties | Votes | % | + / - |
|---|---|---|---|
| Social Democrats | 11,074 | 30.39 | +0.15 |
| Conservatives | 6,308 | 17.31 | -2.05 |
| Venstre | 5,572 | 15.29 | +1.26 |
| Progress Party | 3,876 | 10.64 | +5.27 |
| Social Liberals | 3,357 | 9.21 | -1.10 |
| Green Left | 3,088 | 8.48 | -1.75 |
| Centre Democrats | 1,315 | 3.61 | -0.33 |
| Christian People's Party | 853 | 2.34 | -0.53 |
| Common Course | 519 | 1.42 | -0.12 |
| The Greens | 243 | 0.67 | +0.03 |
| Communist Party of Denmark | 124 | 0.34 | -0.08 |
| Left Socialists | 85 | 0.23 | -0.23 |
| Jan Møgelbjerg | 14 | 0.04 | New |
| Ronald Hansen | 7 | 0.02 | New |
| Total | 36,435 | | |

1987 Danish general election

| Parties | Vote | | |
| Parties | Votes | % | + / - |
|---|---|---|---|
| Social Democrats | 11,045 | 30.24 | -0.29 |
| Conservatives | 7,072 | 19.36 | -1.82 |
| Venstre | 5,124 | 14.03 | -1.64 |
| Social Liberals | 3,766 | 10.31 | -0.21 |
| Green Left | 3,735 | 10.23 | +2.92 |
| Progress Party | 1,963 | 5.37 | +1.26 |
| Centre Democrats | 1,438 | 3.94 | -0.70 |
| Christian People's Party | 1,048 | 2.87 | -0.68 |
| Common Course | 564 | 1.54 | New |
| The Greens | 232 | 0.64 | New |
| Left Socialists | 167 | 0.46 | -0.62 |
| Justice Party of Denmark | 157 | 0.43 | -0.61 |
| Communist Party of Denmark | 155 | 0.42 | +0.11 |
| Humanist Party | 37 | 0.10 | New |
| Socialist Workers Party | 19 | 0.05 | +0.01 |
| Marxist–Leninists Party | 3 | 0.01 | -0.02 |
| Total | 36,525 | | |

1984 Danish general election

| Parties | Vote | | |
| Parties | Votes | % | + / - |
|---|---|---|---|
| Social Democrats | 11,200 | 30.53 | -0.91 |
| Conservatives | 7,771 | 21.18 | +10.23 |
| Venstre | 5,749 | 15.67 | +0.95 |
| Social Liberals | 3,859 | 10.52 | -1.44 |
| Green Left | 2,683 | 7.31 | +0.07 |
| Centre Democrats | 1,701 | 4.64 | -2.23 |
| Progress Party | 1,507 | 4.11 | -6.95 |
| Christian People's Party | 1,302 | 3.55 | +0.47 |
| Left Socialists | 395 | 1.08 | +0.08 |
| Justice Party of Denmark | 382 | 1.04 | +0.09 |
| Communist Party of Denmark | 113 | 0.31 | -0.26 |
| Socialist Workers Party | 16 | 0.04 | 0.00 |
| Marxist–Leninists Party | 11 | 0.03 | New |
| Total | 36,689 | | |

1981 Danish general election

| Parties | Vote | | |
| Parties | Votes | % | + / - |
|---|---|---|---|
| Social Democrats | 10,735 | 31.44 | -2.85 |
| Venstre | 5,027 | 14.72 | -0.73 |
| Social Liberals | 4,083 | 11.96 | -1.66 |
| Progress Party | 3,776 | 11.06 | -0.48 |
| Conservatives | 3,737 | 10.95 | +0.95 |
| Green Left | 2,472 | 7.24 | +3.27 |
| Centre Democrats | 2,346 | 6.87 | +4.10 |
| Christian People's Party | 1,052 | 3.08 | -0.34 |
| Left Socialists | 342 | 1.00 | -0.75 |
| Justice Party of Denmark | 326 | 0.95 | -0.91 |
| Communist Party of Denmark | 194 | 0.57 | -0.44 |
| Communist Workers Party | 36 | 0.11 | -0.21 |
| Socialist Workers Party | 14 | 0.04 | New |
| Total | 34,140 | | |

=== General elections in the 1970s ===
1979 Danish general election

| Parties | Vote | | |
| Parties | Votes | % | + / - |
|---|---|---|---|
| Social Democrats | 11,928 | 34.29 | +0.69 |
| Venstre | 5,374 | 15.45 | -0.21 |
| Social Liberals | 4,739 | 13.62 | +1.90 |
| Progress Party | 4,016 | 11.54 | -2.94 |
| Conservatives | 3,478 | 10.00 | +3.09 |
| Green Left | 1,382 | 3.97 | +1.69 |
| Christian People's Party | 1,190 | 3.42 | -1.15 |
| Centre Democrats | 962 | 2.77 | -1.92 |
| Justice Party of Denmark | 648 | 1.86 | -0.40 |
| Left Socialists | 609 | 1.75 | +0.44 |
| Communist Party of Denmark | 351 | 1.01 | -0.87 |
| Communist Workers Party | 112 | 0.32 | New |
| Total | 34,789 | | |

1977 Danish general election

| Parties | Vote | | |
| Parties | Votes | % | + / - |
|---|---|---|---|
| Social Democrats | 11,330 | 33.60 | +6.28 |
| Venstre | 5,281 | 15.66 | -8.31 |
| Progress Party | 4,884 | 14.48 | +1.66 |
| Social Liberals | 3,951 | 11.72 | -4.94 |
| Conservatives | 2,329 | 6.91 | +3.32 |
| Centre Democrats | 1,581 | 4.69 | +3.57 |
| Christian People's Party | 1,540 | 4.57 | -2.89 |
| Green Left | 768 | 2.28 | -0.20 |
| Justice Party of Denmark | 763 | 2.26 | +1.02 |
| Communist Party of Denmark | 633 | 1.88 | -0.29 |
| Left Socialists | 441 | 1.31 | +0.15 |
| Pensioners' Party | 224 | 0.66 | New |
| Total | 33,725 | | |

1975 Danish general election

| Parties | Vote | | |
| Parties | Votes | % | + / - |
|---|---|---|---|
| Social Democrats | 9,061 | 27.32 | +3.27 |
| Venstre | 7,951 | 23.97 | +9.07 |
| Social Liberals | 5,526 | 16.66 | -6.50 |
| Progress Party | 4,253 | 12.82 | -1.94 |
| Christian People's Party | 2,476 | 7.46 | +2.54 |
| Conservatives | 1,191 | 3.59 | -2.35 |
| Green Left | 822 | 2.48 | -0.90 |
| Communist Party of Denmark | 720 | 2.17 | +0.49 |
| Justice Party of Denmark | 412 | 1.24 | -0.87 |
| Left Socialists | 384 | 1.16 | +0.44 |
| Centre Democrats | 373 | 1.12 | -3.27 |
| Total | 33,169 | | |

1973 Danish general election

| Parties | Vote | | |
| Parties | Votes | % | + / - |
|---|---|---|---|
| Social Democrats | 7,915 | 24.05 | -8.71 |
| Social Liberals | 7,622 | 23.16 | -6.24 |
| Venstre | 4,905 | 14.90 | -3.56 |
| Progress Party | 4,857 | 14.76 | New |
| Conservatives | 1,956 | 5.94 | -3.26 |
| Christian People's Party | 1,618 | 4.92 | +1.97 |
| Centre Democrats | 1,444 | 4.39 | New |
| Green Left | 1,111 | 3.38 | -1.20 |
| Justice Party of Denmark | 695 | 2.11 | +1.03 |
| Communist Party of Denmark | 554 | 1.68 | +0.89 |
| Left Socialists | 236 | 0.72 | -0.05 |
| Total | 32,913 | | |

1971 Danish general election

| Parties | Vote | | |
| Parties | Votes | % | + / - |
|---|---|---|---|
| Social Democrats | 10,105 | 32.76 | +0.08 |
| Social Liberals | 9,067 | 29.40 | +0.44 |
| Venstre | 5,693 | 18.46 | -0.40 |
| Conservatives | 2,839 | 9.20 | -3.62 |
| Green Left | 1,412 | 4.58 | +1.24 |
| Christian People's Party | 911 | 2.95 | New |
| Justice Party of Denmark | 333 | 1.08 | +0.53 |
| Communist Party of Denmark | 244 | 0.79 | +0.17 |
| Left Socialists | 238 | 0.77 | -0.27 |
| Total | 30,842 | | |

=== General elections in the 1960s ===
1968 Danish general election

| Parties | Vote | | |
| Parties | Votes | % | + / - |
|---|---|---|---|
| Social Democrats | 6,963 | 32.68 | -4.27 |
| Social Liberals | 6,169 | 28.96 | +8.35 |
| Venstre | 4,017 | 18.86 | -1.11 |
| Conservatives | 2,731 | 12.82 | +1.23 |
| Green Left | 712 | 3.34 | -3.00 |
| Left Socialists | 222 | 1.04 | New |
| Communist Party of Denmark | 133 | 0.62 | +0.06 |
| Liberal Centre | 121 | 0.57 | -0.80 |
| Justice Party of Denmark | 118 | 0.55 | +0.06 |
| Independent Party | 118 | 0.55 | -1.57 |
| Total | 21,304 | | |

1966 Danish general election

| Parties | Vote | | |
| Parties | Votes | % | + / - |
|---|---|---|---|
| Social Democrats | 7,661 | 36.95 | -1.53 |
| Social Liberals | 4,273 | 20.61 | -0.24 |
| Venstre | 4,139 | 19.97 | +0.10 |
| Conservatives | 2,403 | 11.59 | -0.20 |
| Green Left | 1,314 | 6.34 | +3.55 |
| Independent Party | 439 | 2.12 | -1.47 |
| Liberal Centre | 285 | 1.37 | New |
| Communist Party of Denmark | 116 | 0.56 | -0.29 |
| Justice Party of Denmark | 101 | 0.49 | -0.32 |
| Total | 20,731 | | |

1964 Danish general election

| Parties | Vote | | |
| Parties | Votes | % | + / - |
|---|---|---|---|
| Social Democrats | 7,600 | 38.48 | +2.03 |
| Social Liberals | 4,117 | 20.85 | -5.25 |
| Venstre | 3,925 | 19.87 | +2.11 |
| Conservatives | 2,329 | 11.79 | +2.48 |
| Independent Party | 709 | 3.59 | -1.30 |
| Green Left | 552 | 2.79 | -0.22 |
| Communist Party of Denmark | 168 | 0.85 | -0.10 |
| Justice Party of Denmark | 160 | 0.81 | -0.72 |
| Danish Unity | 118 | 0.60 | New |
| Peace Politics People's Party | 72 | 0.36 | New |
| Total | 19,750 | | |

1960 Danish general election

| Parties | Vote | | |
| Parties | Votes | % | + / - |
|---|---|---|---|
| Social Democrats | 6,700 | 36.45 | +4.01 |
| Social Liberals | 4,797 | 26.10 | -4.08 |
| Venstre | 3,264 | 17.76 | -2.27 |
| Conservatives | 1,711 | 9.31 | +1.78 |
| Independent Party | 899 | 4.89 | -0.27 |
| Green Left | 554 | 3.01 | New |
| Justice Party of Denmark | 282 | 1.53 | -1.39 |
| Communist Party of Denmark | 175 | 0.95 | -0.79 |
| Total | 18,382 | | |

=== General elections in the 1950s ===
1957 Danish general election

| Parties | Vote | | |
| Parties | Votes | % | + / - |
|---|---|---|---|
| Social Democrats | 5,791 | 32.44 | -0.83 |
| Social Liberals | 5,387 | 30.18 | -3.12 |
| Venstre | 3,576 | 20.03 | +0.44 |
| Conservatives | 1,344 | 7.53 | +0.34 |
| Independent Party | 921 | 5.16 | +2.07 |
| Justice Party of Denmark | 522 | 2.92 | +1.35 |
| Communist Party of Denmark | 311 | 1.74 | -0.25 |
| Total | 17,852 | | |

September 1953 Danish Folketing election

| Parties | Vote | | |
| Parties | Votes | % | + / - |
|---|---|---|---|
| Social Liberals | 5,655 | 33.30 | -3.09 |
| Social Democrats | 5,650 | 33.27 | +2.40 |
| Venstre | 3,326 | 19.59 | +0.86 |
| Conservatives | 1,221 | 7.19 | -1.15 |
| Independent Party | 525 | 3.09 | New |
| Communist Party of Denmark | 338 | 1.99 | -0.28 |
| Justice Party of Denmark | 267 | 1.57 | -0.93 |
| Total | 16,982 | | |

April 1953 Danish Folketing election

| Parties | Vote | | |
| Parties | Votes | % | + / - |
|---|---|---|---|
| Social Liberals | 5,844 | 36.39 | -1.35 |
| Social Democrats | 4,957 | 30.87 | +0.49 |
| Venstre | 3,008 | 18.73 | +0.45 |
| Conservatives | 1,339 | 8.34 | -0.01 |
| Justice Party of Denmark | 401 | 2.50 | -0.35 |
| Communist Party of Denmark | 364 | 2.27 | -0.13 |
| Danish Unity | 146 | 0.91 | New |
| Total | 16,059 | | |

1950 Danish Folketing election

| Parties | Vote | | |
| Parties | Votes | % | + / - |
|---|---|---|---|
| Social Liberals | 6,215 | 37.74 | +9.15 |
| Social Democrats | 5,003 | 30.38 | -5.24 |
| Venstre | 3,011 | 18.28 | -3.91 |
| Conservatives | 1,375 | 8.35 | +1.33 |
| Justice Party of Denmark | 470 | 2.85 | +0.89 |
| Communist Party of Denmark | 395 | 2.40 | -1.12 |
| Total | 16,469 | | |

=== General elections in the 1940s ===
1947 Danish Folketing election

| Parties | Vote | | |
| Parties | Votes | % | + / - |
|---|---|---|---|
| Social Democrats | 5,821 | 35.62 | +7.02 |
| Social Liberals | 4,673 | 28.59 | -4.10 |
| Venstre | 3,627 | 22.19 | +3.49 |
| Conservatives | 1,148 | 7.02 | -1.48 |
| Communist Party of Denmark | 575 | 3.52 | -4.12 |
| Justice Party of Denmark | 321 | 1.96 | +1.13 |
| Danish Unity | 178 | 1.09 | -1.95 |
| Total | 16,343 | | |

1945 Danish Folketing election

| Parties | Vote | | |
| Parties | Votes | % | + / - |
|---|---|---|---|
| Social Liberals | 5,261 | 32.69 | -2.48 |
| Social Democrats | 4,603 | 28.60 | -6.83 |
| Venstre | 3,010 | 18.70 | +3.58 |
| Conservatives | 1,368 | 8.50 | -2.24 |
| Communist Party of Denmark | 1,229 | 7.64 | New |
| Danish Unity | 490 | 3.04 | +1.78 |
| Justice Party of Denmark | 134 | 0.83 | +0.23 |
| Total | 16,095 | | |

1943 Danish Folketing election

| Parties | Vote | | |
| Parties | Votes | % | + / - |
|---|---|---|---|
| Social Democrats | 5,639 | 35.43 | -0.09 |
| Social Liberals | 5,598 | 35.17 | +1.89 |
| Venstre | 2,406 | 15.12 | +2.08 |
| Conservatives | 1,709 | 10.74 | +0.42 |
| Danish Unity | 200 | 1.26 | +1.11 |
| Farmers' Party | 161 | 1.01 | -3.15 |
| National Socialist Workers' Party of Denmark | 106 | 0.67 | -0.01 |
| Justice Party of Denmark | 96 | 0.60 | -0.27 |
| Total | 15,915 | | |

=== General elections in the 1930s ===
1939 Danish Folketing election

| Parties | Vote | | |
| Parties | Votes | % | + / - |
|---|---|---|---|
| Social Democrats | 4,697 | 35.52 | -1.54 |
| Social Liberals | 4,401 | 33.28 | -0.94 |
| Venstre | 1,724 | 13.04 | -0.49 |
| Conservatives | 1,365 | 10.32 | +0.19 |
| Farmers' Party | 550 | 4.16 | +2.33 |
| Communist Party of Denmark | 210 | 1.59 | +0.24 |
| Justice Party of Denmark | 115 | 0.87 | -0.73 |
| National Socialist Workers' Party of Denmark | 90 | 0.68 | +0.41 |
| National Cooperation | 52 | 0.39 | New |
| Danish Unity | 20 | 0.15 | New |
| Total | 13,224 | | |

1935 Danish Folketing election

| Parties | Vote | | |
| Parties | Votes | % | + / - |
|---|---|---|---|
| Social Democrats | 4,757 | 37.06 | +3.35 |
| Social Liberals | 4,392 | 34.22 | -2.99 |
| Venstre | 1,737 | 13.53 | -1.80 |
| Conservatives | 1,300 | 10.13 | -1.21 |
| Independent People's Party | 235 | 1.83 | New |
| Justice Party of Denmark | 206 | 1.60 | -0.05 |
| Communist Party of Denmark | 173 | 1.35 | +0.60 |
| National Socialist Workers' Party of Denmark | 35 | 0.27 | New |
| Total | 12,835 | | |

1932 Danish Folketing election

| Parties | Vote | | |
| Parties | Votes | % | + / - |
|---|---|---|---|
| Social Liberals | 4,475 | 37.21 | -4.55 |
| Social Democrats | 4,054 | 33.71 | +3.55 |
| Venstre | 1,844 | 15.33 | -1.79 |
| Conservatives | 1,364 | 11.34 | +2.17 |
| Justice Party of Denmark | 198 | 1.65 | +0.33 |
| Communist Party of Denmark | 90 | 0.75 | +0.28 |
| Total | 12,025 | | |

=== General elections in the 1920s ===
1929 Danish Folketing election

| Parties | Vote | | |
| Parties | Votes | % | + / - |
|---|---|---|---|
| Social Liberals | 4,548 | 41.76 | +3.25 |
| Social Democrats | 3,284 | 30.16 | +4.31 |
| Venstre | 1,864 | 17.12 | -1.45 |
| Conservatives | 999 | 9.17 | -6.02 |
| Justice Party of Denmark | 144 | 1.32 | +0.27 |
| Communist Party of Denmark | 51 | 0.47 | -0.37 |
| Total | 10,890 | | |

1926 Danish Folketing election

| Parties | Vote | | |
| Parties | Votes | % | + / - |
|---|---|---|---|
| Social Liberals | 3,725 | 38.51 | -5.70 |
| Social Democrats | 2,500 | 25.85 | +2.46 |
| Venstre | 1,796 | 18.57 | +0.59 |
| Conservatives | 1,469 | 15.19 | +1.50 |
| Justice Party of Denmark | 102 | 1.05 | New |
| Communist Party of Denmark | 81 | 0.84 | +0.34 |
| Total | 9,673 | | |

1924 Danish Folketing election

| Parties | Vote | | |
| Parties | Votes | % | + / - |
|---|---|---|---|
| Social Liberals | 4,264 | 44.21 | +0.38 |
| Social Democrats | 2,256 | 23.39 | +4.83 |
| Venstre | 1,734 | 17.98 | -1.48 |
| Conservatives | 1,320 | 13.69 | -4.00 |
| Communist Party of Denmark | 48 | 0.50 | New |
| Farmer Party | 23 | 0.24 | New |
| Total | 9,645 | | |

September 1920 Danish Folketing election

| Parties | Vote | | |
| Parties | Votes | % | + / - |
|---|---|---|---|
| Social Liberals | 3,932 | 43.83 | +3.35 |
| Venstre | 1,746 | 19.46 | -1.74 |
| Social Democrats | 1,665 | 18.56 | +1.39 |
| Conservatives | 1,587 | 17.69 | -2.87 |
| Danish Left Socialist Party | 42 | 0.47 | New |
| Total | 8,972 | | |

July 1920 Danish Folketing election

| Parties | Vote | | |
| Parties | Votes | % | + / - |
|---|---|---|---|
| Social Liberals | 2,983 | 40.48 | -0.86 |
| Venstre | 1,562 | 21.20 | +2.10 |
| Conservatives | 1,515 | 20.56 | -0.06 |
| Social Democrats | 1,265 | 17.17 | -1.76 |
| Maris Andr. Larsen | 36 | 0.49 | New |
| Industry Party | 7 | 0.09 | New |
| Frederik Lajer | 1 | 0.01 | New |
| Total | 7,369 | | |

April 1920 Danish Folketing election

| Parties | Vote | |
| Parties | Votes | % |
|---|---|---|
| Social Liberals | 3,153 | 41.34 |
| Conservatives | 1,573 | 20.62 |
| Venstre | 1,457 | 19.10 |
| Social Democrats | 1,444 | 18.93 |
| Total | 7,627 | |

== European Parliament elections results ==
2024 European Parliament election in Denmark

| Parties | Vote | | |
| Parties | Votes | % | + / - |
|---|---|---|---|
| Denmark Democrats | 3,647 | 20.43 | New |
| Venstre | 3,179 | 17.81 | -15.35 |
| Social Democrats | 3,013 | 16.88 | -7.55 |
| Green Left | 2,265 | 12.69 | +3.68 |
| Danish People's Party | 1,289 | 7.22 | -4.31 |
| Liberal Alliance | 1,083 | 6.07 | +4.5 |
| Conservatives | 1,081 | 6.06 | +1.89 |
| Moderates | 958 | 5.37 | New |
| Social Liberals | 616 | 3.45 | -3.51 |
| Red–Green Alliance | 491 | 2.75 | -0.31 |
| The Alternative | 228 | 1.28 | -0.17 |
| Total | 17,850 | | |

2019 European Parliament election in Denmark

| Parties | Vote | | |
| Parties | Votes | % | + / - |
|---|---|---|---|
| Venstre | 7,169 | 33.16 | +11.34 |
| Social Democrats | 5,283 | 24.43 | +5.16 |
| Danish People's Party | 2,493 | 11.53 | -18.61 |
| Green Left | 1,948 | 9.01 | +2.40 |
| Social Liberals | 1,504 | 6.96 | +1.13 |
| People's Movement against the EU | 1,007 | 4.66 | -2.69 |
| Conservatives | 902 | 4.17 | -2.95 |
| Red–Green Alliance | 661 | 3.06 | New |
| Liberal Alliance | 340 | 1.57 | -0.28 |
| The Alternative | 314 | 1.45 | New |
| Total | 21,621 | | |

2014 European Parliament election in Denmark

| Parties | Vote | | |
| Parties | Votes | % | + / - |
|---|---|---|---|
| Danish People's Party | 5,616 | 30.14 | +15.56 |
| Venstre | 4,065 | 21.82 | -5.54 |
| Social Democrats | 3,591 | 19.27 | -0.98 |
| People's Movement against the EU | 1,370 | 7.35 | -1.16 |
| Conservatives | 1,326 | 7.12 | -3.40 |
| Green Left | 1,232 | 6.61 | -5.54 |
| Social Liberals | 1,086 | 5.83 | +0.83 |
| Liberal Alliance | 345 | 1.85 | +1.57 |
| Total | 18,631 | | |

2009 European Parliament election in Denmark

| Parties | Vote | | |
| Parties | Votes | % | + / - |
|---|---|---|---|
| Venstre | 5,186 | 27.36 | +1.57 |
| Social Democrats | 3,839 | 20.25 | -13.79 |
| Danish People's Party | 2,764 | 14.58 | +7.65 |
| Green Left | 2,304 | 12.15 | +6.39 |
| Conservatives | 1,995 | 10.52 | +2.25 |
| People's Movement against the EU | 1,613 | 8.51 | +3.77 |
| Social Liberals | 948 | 5.00 | -1.46 |
| June Movement | 254 | 1.34 | -5.51 |
| Liberal Alliance | 54 | 0.28 | New |
| Total | 18,957 | | |

2004 European Parliament election in Denmark

| Parties | Vote | | |
| Parties | Votes | % | + / - |
|---|---|---|---|
| Social Democrats | 6,279 | 34.04 | +15.58 |
| Venstre | 4,757 | 25.79 | -2.03 |
| Conservatives | 1,526 | 8.27 | +1.29 |
| Danish People's Party | 1,278 | 6.93 | +1.82 |
| June Movement | 1,264 | 6.85 | -6.29 |
| Social Liberals | 1,191 | 6.46 | -5.41 |
| Green Left | 1,063 | 5.76 | +0.24 |
| People's Movement against the EU | 875 | 4.74 | -1.49 |
| Christian Democrats | 213 | 1.15 | -0.89 |
| Total | 18,446 | | |

1999 European Parliament election in Denmark

| Parties | Vote | | |
| Parties | Votes | % | + / - |
|---|---|---|---|
| Venstre | 5,338 | 27.82 | +5.86 |
| Social Democrats | 3,543 | 18.46 | -4.42 |
| June Movement | 2,522 | 13.14 | +4.01 |
| Social Liberals | 2,278 | 11.87 | +0.46 |
| Conservatives | 1,339 | 6.98 | -9.47 |
| People's Movement against the EU | 1,196 | 6.23 | -1.26 |
| Green Left | 1,059 | 5.52 | -0.23 |
| Danish People's Party | 981 | 5.11 | New |
| Centre Democrats | 543 | 2.83 | +2.30 |
| Christian Democrats | 392 | 2.04 | +1.01 |
| Progress Party | 183 | 0.95 | -2.42 |
| Total | 19,191 | | |

1994 European Parliament election in Denmark

| Parties | Vote | | |
| Parties | Votes | % | + / - |
|---|---|---|---|
| Social Democrats | 4,896 | 22.88 | -6.48 |
| Venstre | 4,700 | 21.96 | -2.23 |
| Conservatives | 3,520 | 16.45 | +6.17 |
| Social Liberals | 2,441 | 11.41 | +5.31 |
| June Movement | 1,954 | 9.13 | New |
| People's Movement against the EU | 1,604 | 7.49 | -3.03 |
| Green Left | 1,230 | 5.75 | +0.18 |
| Progress Party | 722 | 3.37 | -2.09 |
| Christian Democrats | 221 | 1.03 | -1.75 |
| Centre Democrats | 114 | 0.53 | -5.21 |
| Total | 21,402 | | |

1989 European Parliament election in Denmark

| Parties | Vote | | |
| Parties | Votes | % | + / - |
|---|---|---|---|
| Social Democrats | 5,370 | 29.36 | +9.95 |
| Venstre | 4,425 | 24.19 | +1.36 |
| People's Movement against the EU | 1,925 | 10.52 | -2.08 |
| Conservatives | 1,881 | 10.28 | -6.87 |
| Social Liberals | 1,115 | 6.10 | -1.38 |
| Centre Democrats | 1,049 | 5.74 | -0.96 |
| Green Left | 1,018 | 5.57 | -0.92 |
| Progress Party | 999 | 5.46 | +1.78 |
| Christian Democrats | 509 | 2.78 | -0.53 |
| Total | 18,291 | | |

1984 European Parliament election in Denmark

| Parties | Vote | |
| Parties | Votes | % |
|---|---|---|
| Venstre | 4,620 | 22.83 |
| Social Democrats | 3,927 | 19.41 |
| Conservatives | 3,470 | 17.15 |
| People's Movement against the EU | 2,550 | 12.60 |
| Social Liberals | 1,513 | 7.48 |
| Centre Democrats | 1,356 | 6.70 |
| Green Left | 1,314 | 6.49 |
| Progress Party | 745 | 3.68 |
| Christian Democrats | 670 | 3.31 |
| Left Socialists | 72 | 0.36 |
| Total | 20,237 | |

== Referendums ==
2022 Danish European Union opt-out referendum

| Option | Votes | % |
|---|---|---|
| ✓ YES | 14,251 | 62.84 |
| X NO | 8,427 | 37.16 |

2015 Danish European Union opt-out referendum

| Option | Votes | % |
|---|---|---|
| X NO | 13,470 | 54.36 |
| ✓ YES | 11,311 | 45.64 |

2014 Danish Unified Patent Court membership referendum

| Option | Votes | % |
|---|---|---|
| ✓ YES | 11,414 | 62.96 |
| X NO | 6,714 | 37.04 |

2009 Danish Act of Succession referendum

| Option | Votes | % |
|---|---|---|
| ✓ YES | 15,601 | 86.16 |
| X NO | 2,505 | 13.84 |

2000 Danish euro referendum

| Option | Votes | % |
|---|---|---|
| X NO | 19,832 | 53.95 |
| ✓ YES | 16,929 | 46.05 |

1998 Danish Amsterdam Treaty referendum

| Option | Votes | % |
|---|---|---|
| ✓ YES | 18,683 | 60.13 |
| X NO | 12,386 | 39.87 |

1993 Danish Maastricht Treaty referendum

| Option | Votes | % |
|---|---|---|
| ✓ YES | 22,979 | 64.28 |
| X NO | 12,769 | 35.72 |

1992 Danish Maastricht Treaty referendum

| Option | Votes | % |
|---|---|---|
| ✓ YES | 18,706 | 53.40 |
| X NO | 16,326 | 46.60 |

1986 Danish Single European Act referendum

| Option | Votes | % |
|---|---|---|
| ✓ YES | 20,555 | 66.04 |
| X NO | 10,572 | 33.96 |

1972 Danish European Communities membership referendum

| Option | Votes | % |
|---|---|---|
| ✓ YES | 23,311 | 72.11 |
| X NO | 9,014 | 27.89 |

1953 Danish constitutional and electoral age referendum

| Option | Votes | % |
|---|---|---|
| ✓ YES | 10,420 | 85.20 |
| X NO | 1,810 | 14.80 |
| 21 years | 6,465 | 51.19 |
| 23 years | 6,165 | 48.81 |

1939 Danish constitutional referendum

| Option | Votes | % |
|---|---|---|
| ✓ YES | 8,983 | 93.89 |
| X NO | 585 | 6.11 |
