= Holstebro (nomination district) =

- Holstebro
- Nomination district constituency for the Folketing
- Location of Holstebro within West Jutland

- Location of West Jutland within Denmark
- Municipalities: Holstebro
- Constituency: West Jutland
- Electorate: 43,147 (2022)

Current constituency
- Created: 1849 (as constituency); 1920 (as nomination district)

Holstebro nominating district is one of the 92 nominating districts that exists for Danish elections following the 2007 municipal reform. It consists of Holstebro Municipality. It was created in 1849 as a constituency, and has been a nomination district since 1920, though its boundaries have been changed since then.

In general elections, the district is a strong area for parties commonly associated with the blue bloc.

== General elections results ==
=== General elections in the 2020s ===
2022 Danish general election

Parties	Vote		
Parties	Votes	%	+ / -
Social Democrats	9,740	26.77	-1.01
Venstre	8,916	24.51	-6.14
Denmark Democrats	4,497	12.36	New
Liberal Alliance	2,990	8.22	+5.75
Green Left	2,399	6.59	-0.08
Conservatives	1,884	5.18	-1.43
Moderates	1,884	5.18	New
New Right	940	2.58	+1.05
Danish People's Party	783	2.15	-5.87
Red–Green Alliance	740	2.03	-1.40
Social Liberals	624	1.72	-3.28
Christian Democrats	446	1.23	-3.19
The Alternative	387	1.06	-0.33
Independent Greens	119	0.33	New
Karen Predbjørn Klarbæk	35	0.10	New
Total	36,384		

=== General elections in the 2010s ===
2019 Danish general election

Parties	Vote		
Parties	Votes	%	+ / -
Venstre	11,251	30.65	+4.40
Social Democrats	10,196	27.78	-1.52
Danish People's Party	2,945	8.02	-12.57
Green Left	2,447	6.67	+3.14
Conservatives	2,427	6.61	+3.12
Social Liberals	1,836	5.00	+2.23
Christian Democrats	1,623	4.42	+2.46
Red–Green Alliance	1,259	3.43	-0.64
Liberal Alliance	907	2.47	-3.27
New Right	563	1.53	New
Stram Kurs	541	1.47	New
The Alternative	512	1.39	-0.79
Klaus Riskær Pedersen Party	197	0.54	New
Total	36,704		

2015 Danish general election

Parties	Vote		
Parties	Votes	%	+ / -
Social Democrats	10,762	29.30	+5.07
Venstre	9,642	26.25	-3.42
Danish People's Party	7,563	20.59	+9.51
Liberal Alliance	2,107	5.74	+0.41
Red–Green Alliance	1,496	4.07	+0.56
Green Left	1,296	3.53	-5.24
Conservatives	1,281	3.49	-0.30
Social Liberals	1,017	2.77	-4.02
The Alternative	799	2.18	New
Christian Democrats	720	1.96	-4.81
Erik Sputnik	44	0.12	New
Total	36,727		

2011 Danish general election

Parties	Vote		
Parties	Votes	%	+ / -
Venstre	10,991	29.67	-10.16
Social Democrats	8,977	24.23	-0.14
Danish People's Party	4,105	11.08	-0.20
Green Left	3,250	8.77	-1.49
Social Liberals	2,516	6.79	+2.99
Christian Democrats	2,510	6.77	+4.11
Liberal Alliance	1,975	5.33	+3.78
Conservatives	1,405	3.79	-1.66
Red–Green Alliance	1,302	3.51	+2.73
Rikke Cramer Christiansen	16	0.04	New
Ejgil Kølbæk	3	0.01	-0.01
Total	37,050		

=== General elections in the 2000s ===
2007 Danish general election

Parties	Vote		
Parties	Votes	%	+ / -
Venstre	14,553	39.83	-0.84
Social Democrats	8,906	24.37	+0.86
Danish People's Party	4,122	11.28	-0.04
Green Left	3,749	10.26	+4.93
Conservatives	1,992	5.45	-0.82
Social Liberals	1,390	3.80	-2.59
Christian Democrats	972	2.66	-1.40
New Alliance	565	1.55	New
Red–Green Alliance	284	0.78	-0.65
Ejgil Kølbæk	9	0.02	0.00
Total	36,542		

2005 Danish general election

Parties	Vote		
Parties	Votes	%	+ / -
Venstre	20,355	40.67	+1.37
Social Democrats	11,768	23.51	-3.44
Danish People's Party	5,665	11.32	+0.40
Social Liberals	3,199	6.39	+2.45
Conservatives	3,138	6.27	-0.29
Green Left	2,669	5.33	+0.44
Christian Democrats	2,032	4.06	-0.63
Red–Green Alliance	715	1.43	+0.66
Centre Democrats	446	0.89	-0.36
Minority Party	55	0.11	New
Ejgil Kølbæk	10	0.02	New
Total	50,052		

2001 Danish general election

Parties	Vote		
Parties	Votes	%	+ / -
Venstre	20,207	39.30	+9.44
Social Democrats	13,857	26.95	-7.15
Danish People's Party	5,614	10.92	+3.87
Conservatives	3,375	6.56	-0.52
Green Left	2,516	4.89	-1.23
Christian People's Party	2,411	4.69	-1.85
Social Liberals	2,027	3.94	+1.39
Centre Democrats	641	1.25	-2.45
Red–Green Alliance	398	0.77	-0.18
Progress Party	373	0.73	-1.09
Total	51,419		

=== General elections in the 1990s ===
1998 Danish general election

Parties	Vote		
Parties	Votes	%	+ / -
Social Democrats	17,284	34.10	+0.81
Venstre	15,134	29.86	-0.04
Conservatives	3,587	7.08	-7.16
Danish People's Party	3,574	7.05	New
Christian People's Party	3,316	6.54	+2.50
Green Left	3,101	6.12	+1.03
Centre Democrats	1,873	3.70	+1.29
Social Liberals	1,295	2.55	-0.47
Progress Party	925	1.82	-4.97
Red–Green Alliance	481	0.95	-0.28
Democratic Renewal	118	0.23	New
Total	50,688		

1994 Danish general election

Parties	Vote		
Parties	Votes	%	+ / -
Social Democrats	16,466	33.29	-0.36
Venstre	14,787	29.90	+9.27
Conservatives	7,042	14.24	-0.05
Progress Party	3,358	6.79	-2.33
Green Left	2,515	5.09	-0.34
Christian People's Party	1,998	4.04	-1.45
Social Liberals	1,493	3.02	+0.34
Centre Democrats	1,193	2.41	-3.90
Red–Green Alliance	606	1.23	+0.77
Total	49,458		

1990 Danish general election

Parties	Vote		
Parties	Votes	%	+ / -
Social Democrats	16,160	33.65	+7.10
Venstre	9,909	20.63	+2.56
Conservatives	6,860	14.29	-1.67
Progress Party	4,379	9.12	-1.65
Centre Democrats	3,029	6.31	-2.27
Christian People's Party	2,638	5.49	+0.61
Green Left	2,609	5.43	-2.64
Social Liberals	1,286	2.68	-1.77
Common Course	510	1.06	-0.20
Red–Green Alliance	222	0.46	New
The Greens	220	0.46	-0.35
Justice Party of Denmark	200	0.42	New
Total	48,022		

=== General elections in the 1980s ===
1988 Danish general election

Parties	Vote		
Parties	Votes	%	+ / -
Social Democrats	13,100	26.55	-0.43
Venstre	8,918	18.07	+1.36
Conservatives	7,878	15.96	-2.11
Progress Party	5,313	10.77	+4.90
Centre Democrats	4,232	8.58	-0.26
Green Left	3,982	8.07	-1.22
Christian People's Party	2,407	4.88	-0.62
Social Liberals	2,197	4.45	-0.45
Common Course	624	1.26	-0.26
The Greens	398	0.81	-0.03
Communist Party of Denmark	197	0.40	+0.39
Left Socialists	78	0.16	-0.26
Kaj Ove Sørensen	22	0.04	New
Total	49,346		

1987 Danish general election

Parties	Vote		
Parties	Votes	%	+ / -
Social Democrats	13,341	26.98	-0.55
Conservatives	8,936	18.07	-3.17
Venstre	8,261	16.71	-2.12
Green Left	4,595	9.29	+1.97
Centre Democrats	4,373	8.84	+2.09
Progress Party	2,902	5.87	+1.11
Christian People's Party	2,721	5.50	-1.24
Social Liberals	2,421	4.90	+0.58
Common Course	754	1.52	New
The Greens	415	0.84	New
Justice Party of Denmark	228	0.46	-0.79
Socialist Workers Party	223	0.45	+0.44
Left Socialists	206	0.42	-0.42
Humanist Party	60	0.12	New
Ian Jordan	4	0.01	New
Communist Party of Denmark	3	0.01	-0.37
Marxist–Leninists Party	3	0.01	0.00
Erik Haaest	2	0.00	New
Total	49,448		

1984 Danish general election

Parties	Vote		
Parties	Votes	%	+ / -
Social Democrats	13,567	27.53	-1.73
Conservatives	10,466	21.24	+9.48
Venstre	9,278	18.83	+0.99
Green Left	3,608	7.32	+0.24
Centre Democrats	3,324	6.75	-3.09
Christian People's Party	3,323	6.74	+0.97
Progress Party	2,344	4.76	-6.96
Social Liberals	2,131	4.32	+0.19
Justice Party of Denmark	616	1.25	+0.07
Left Socialists	416	0.84	+0.04
Communist Party of Denmark	188	0.38	-0.15
Marxist–Leninists Party	7	0.01	New
Socialist Workers Party	4	0.01	-0.01
Total	49,272		

1981 Danish general election

Parties	Vote		
Parties	Votes	%	+ / -
Social Democrats	13,395	29.26	-4.02
Venstre	8,166	17.84	-1.41
Conservatives	5,383	11.76	+0.67
Progress Party	5,365	11.72	-0.82
Centre Democrats	4,505	9.84	+6.05
Green Left	3,240	7.08	+3.52
Christian People's Party	2,641	5.77	-0.44
Social Liberals	1,891	4.13	-1.14
Justice Party of Denmark	540	1.18	-1.03
Left Socialists	365	0.80	-0.88
Communist Party of Denmark	244	0.53	-0.31
Communist Workers Party	36	0.08	-0.19
Socialist Workers Party	7	0.02	New
Total	45,778		

=== General elections in the 1970s ===
1979 Danish general election

Parties	Vote		
Parties	Votes	%	+ / -
Social Democrats	15,314	33.28	+3.21
Venstre	8,859	19.25	-0.73
Progress Party	5,769	12.54	-4.35
Conservatives	5,103	11.09	+3.63
Christian People's Party	2,857	6.21	-1.14
Social Liberals	2,423	5.27	+1.65
Centre Democrats	1,745	3.79	-2.31
Green Left	1,640	3.56	+1.53
Justice Party of Denmark	1,019	2.21	-0.67
Left Socialists	771	1.68	+0.32
Communist Party of Denmark	385	0.84	-0.92
Communist Workers Party	125	0.27	New
Total	46,010		

1977 Danish general election

Parties	Vote		
Parties	Votes	%	+ / -
Social Democrats	13,180	30.07	+6.05
Venstre	8,757	19.98	-11.70
Progress Party	7,403	16.89	+2.06
Conservatives	3,272	7.46	+3.47
Christian People's Party	3,222	7.35	-2.22
Centre Democrats	2,675	6.10	+3.39
Social Liberals	1,587	3.62	-2.81
Justice Party of Denmark	1,264	2.88	+1.23
Green Left	891	2.03	-0.29
Communist Party of Denmark	772	1.76	-0.02
Left Socialists	596	1.36	+0.35
Pensioners' Party	217	0.50	New
Total	43,836		

1975 Danish general election

Parties	Vote		
Parties	Votes	%	+ / -
Venstre	13,622	31.68	+13.35
Social Democrats	10,326	24.02	+4.09
Progress Party	6,377	14.83	-3.28
Christian People's Party	4,115	9.57	+0.82
Social Liberals	2,765	6.43	-6.45
Conservatives	1,717	3.99	-3.60
Centre Democrats	1,164	2.71	-3.87
Green Left	998	2.32	-0.52
Communist Party of Denmark	766	1.78	+0.36
Justice Party of Denmark	711	1.65	-1.17
Left Socialists	436	1.01	+0.26
Total	42,997		

1973 Danish general election

Parties	Vote		
Parties	Votes	%	+ / -
Social Democrats	8,413	19.93	-12.46
Venstre	7,737	18.33	-7.32
Progress Party	7,643	18.11	New
Social Liberals	5,435	12.88	-2.72
Christian People's Party	3,691	8.75	+3.92
Conservatives	3,202	7.59	-5.85
Centre Democrats	2,779	6.58	New
Green Left	1,197	2.84	-1.86
Justice Party of Denmark	1,189	2.82	+0.65
Communist Party of Denmark	599	1.42	+0.79
Left Socialists	318	0.75	+0.16
Total	42,203		

1971 Danish general election

Parties	Vote		
Parties	Votes	%	+ / -
Social Democrats	12,599	32.39	+1.72
Venstre	9,977	25.65	-10.54
Social Liberals	6,067	15.60	+3.90
Conservatives	5,226	13.44	-1.47
Christian People's Party	1,877	4.83	New
Green Left	1,829	4.70	+2.38
Justice Party of Denmark	843	2.17	+0.95
Communist Party of Denmark	244	0.63	+0.44
Left Socialists	230	0.59	-0.07
Total	38,892		

=== General elections in the 1960s ===
1968 Danish general election

Parties	Vote		
Parties	Votes	%	+ / -
Venstre	8,767	36.19	-0.43
Social Democrats	7,430	30.67	-4.21
Conservatives	3,611	14.91	+1.70
Social Liberals	2,835	11.70	+6.60
Green Left	562	2.32	-1.55
Independent Party	298	1.23	-2.12
Justice Party of Denmark	296	1.22	+0.03
Liberal Centre	217	0.90	-0.67
Left Socialists	160	0.66	New
Communist Party of Denmark	46	0.19	-0.02
Total	24,222		

1966 Danish general election

Parties	Vote		
Parties	Votes	%	+ / -
Venstre	8,601	36.62	+0.88
Social Democrats	8,193	34.88	-0.69
Conservatives	3,102	13.21	-1.92
Social Liberals	1,198	5.10	+0.94
Green Left	909	3.87	+2.08
Independent Party	786	3.35	-1.23
Liberal Centre	368	1.57	New
Justice Party of Denmark	280	1.19	-0.97
Communist Party of Denmark	49	0.21	-0.02
Total	23,486		

1964 Danish general election

Parties	Vote		
Parties	Votes	%	+ / -
Venstre	7,765	35.74	+1.21
Social Democrats	7,728	35.57	+1.70
Conservatives	3,288	15.13	+1.79
Independent Party	996	4.58	-3.71
Social Liberals	904	4.16	-0.39
Justice Party of Denmark	469	2.16	-1.07
Green Left	388	1.79	-0.04
Danish Unity	83	0.38	New
Peace Politics People's Party	58	0.27	New
Communist Party of Denmark	50	0.23	-0.03
Total	21,729		

1960 Danish general election

Parties	Vote		
Parties	Votes	%	+ / -
Venstre	6,686	34.53	-7.08
Social Democrats	6,558	33.87	+4.96
Conservatives	2,583	13.34	+2.68
Independent Party	1,606	8.29	+2.83
Social Liberals	882	4.55	-0.40
Justice Party of Denmark	625	3.23	-4.50
Green Left	355	1.83	New
Communist Party of Denmark	51	0.26	-0.42
Jon Galster	18	0.09	New
Total	19,364		

=== General elections in the 1950s ===
1957 Danish general election

Parties	Vote		
Parties	Votes	%	+ / -
Venstre	7,478	41.61	+2.00
Social Democrats	5,196	28.91	-3.01
Conservatives	1,916	10.66	+0.11
Justice Party of Denmark	1,389	7.73	+3.03
Independent Party	981	5.46	-1.35
Social Liberals	889	4.95	-0.50
Communist Party of Denmark	123	0.68	-0.28
Total	17,972		

September 1953 Danish Folketing election

Parties	Vote		
Parties	Votes	%	+ / -
Venstre	6,291	39.61	-0.82
Social Democrats	5,069	31.92	+0.48
Conservatives	1,675	10.55	-1.33
Independent Party	1,082	6.81	New
Social Liberals	866	5.45	-0.54
Justice Party of Denmark	747	4.70	-3.59
Communist Party of Denmark	152	0.96	-0.24
Total	15,882		

April 1953 Danish Folketing election

Parties	Vote		
Parties	Votes	%	+ / -
Venstre	5,879	40.43	-0.56
Social Democrats	4,571	31.44	-0.07
Conservatives	1,727	11.88	-0.15
Justice Party of Denmark	1,205	8.29	-1.56
Social Liberals	871	5.99	+1.32
Communist Party of Denmark	174	1.20	+0.26
Danish Unity	114	0.78	New
Total	14,541		

1950 Danish Folketing election

Parties	Vote		
Parties	Votes	%	+ / -
Venstre	6,061	40.99	-10.19
Social Democrats	4,659	31.51	+1.50
Conservatives	1,779	12.03	+5.04
Justice Party of Denmark	1,457	9.85	+4.76
Social Liberals	690	4.67	+0.55
Communist Party of Denmark	139	0.94	-0.58
Total	14,785		

=== General elections in the 1940s ===
1947 Danish Folketing election

Parties	Vote		
Parties	Votes	%	+ / -
Venstre	7,544	51.18	+3.37
Social Democrats	4,424	30.01	+1.24
Conservatives	1,031	6.99	-2.09
Justice Party of Denmark	750	5.09	+2.38
Social Liberals	607	4.12	-2.00
Communist Party of Denmark	224	1.52	-1.50
Danish Unity	160	1.09	-1.40
Total	14,740		

1945 Danish Folketing election

Parties	Vote		
Parties	Votes	%	+ / -
Venstre	6,870	47.81	+6.39
Social Democrats	4,134	28.77	-3.69
Conservatives	1,304	9.08	-3.76
Social Liberals	880	6.12	+1.68
Communist Party of Denmark	434	3.02	New
Justice Party of Denmark	389	2.71	+0.85
Danish Unity	358	2.49	+1.36
Total	14,369		

1943 Danish Folketing election

Parties	Vote		
Parties	Votes	%	+ / -
Venstre	5,731	41.42	+6.19
Social Democrats	4,491	32.46	+2.30
Conservatives	1,776	12.84	+2.19
Farmers' Party	671	4.85	-9.29
Social Liberals	614	4.44	-1.06
Justice Party of Denmark	258	1.86	-0.74
Danish Unity	156	1.13	+0.89
National Socialist Workers' Party of Denmark	138	1.00	+0.46
Total	13,835		

=== General elections in the 1930s ===
1939 Danish Folketing election

Parties	Vote		
Parties	Votes	%	+ / -
Venstre	4,160	35.23	+2.87
Social Democrats	3,561	30.16	-0.21
Farmers' Party	1,669	14.14	-4.11
Conservatives	1,257	10.65	-1.16
Social Liberals	649	5.50	+1.10
Justice Party of Denmark	307	2.60	+0.54
Communist Party of Denmark	65	0.55	+0.14
National Socialist Workers' Party of Denmark	64	0.54	+0.21
National Cooperation	47	0.40	New
Danish Unity	28	0.24	New
Total	11,807		

1935 Danish Folketing election

Parties	Vote		
Parties	Votes	%	+ / -
Venstre	3,575	32.36	-19.61
Social Democrats	3,355	30.37	+3.66
Independent People's Party	2,016	18.25	New
Conservatives	1,304	11.81	-1.50
Social Liberals	486	4.40	-1.20
Justice Party of Denmark	228	2.06	-0.36
Communist Party of Denmark	45	0.41	New
National Socialist Workers' Party of Denmark	37	0.33	New
Total	11,046		

1932 Danish Folketing election

Parties	Vote		
Parties	Votes	%	+ / -
Venstre	5,572	51.97	-6.83
Social Democrats	2,864	26.71	+0.67
Conservatives	1,427	13.31	+4.87
Social Liberals	600	5.60	0.00
Justice Party of Denmark	259	2.42	+1.30
Total	10,722		

=== General elections in the 1920s ===
1929 Danish Folketing election

Parties	Vote		
Parties	Votes	%	+ / -
Venstre	6,016	58.80	-1.29
Social Democrats	2,664	26.04	+1.67
Conservatives	864	8.44	-2.31
Social Liberals	573	5.60	+1.26
Justice Party of Denmark	115	1.12	+0.66
Total	10,232		

1926 Danish Folketing election

Parties	Vote		
Parties	Votes	%	+ / -
Venstre	5,647	60.09	-2.32
Social Democrats	2,290	24.37	+1.07
Conservatives	1,010	10.75	+1.57
Social Liberals	408	4.34	+0.03
Justice Party of Denmark	43	0.46	-0.19
Total	9,398		

1924 Danish Folketing election

Parties	Vote		
Parties	Votes	%	+ / -
Venstre	5,624	62.41	-11.66
Social Democrats	2,100	23.30	+7.46
Conservatives	827	9.18	+3.56
Social Liberals	388	4.31	+0.84
Justice Party of Denmark	59	0.65	New
Farmer Party	13	0.14	New
Total	9,011		

September 1920 Danish Folketing election

Parties	Vote		
Parties	Votes	%	+ / -
Venstre	6,561	74.07	-2.83
Social Democrats	1,403	15.84	+2.32
Conservatives	498	5.62	+0.16
Social Liberals	307	3.47	+0.09
Industry Party	89	1.00	+0.26
Total	8,858		

July 1920 Danish Folketing election

Parties	Vote		
Parties	Votes	%	+ / -
Venstre	5,749	76.90	+0.92
Social Democrats	1,011	13.52	-0.87
Conservatives	408	5.46	-0.27
Social Liberals	253	3.38	-0.52
Industry Party	55	0.74	New
Total	7,476		

April 1920 Danish Folketing election

Parties	Vote	
Parties	Votes	%
Venstre	5,979	75.98
Social Democrats	1,132	14.39
Conservatives	451	5.73
Social Liberals	307	3.90
Total	7,869	

== European Parliament elections results ==
2024 European Parliament election in Denmark

Parties	Vote		
Parties	Votes	%	+ / -
Venstre	5,131	21.22	-25.88
Social Democrats	3,986	16.48	-2.16
Green Left	3,151	13.03	+4.53
Denmark Democrats	2,872	11.88	New
Liberal Alliance	2,088	8.63	+7.15
Conservatives	2,020	8.35	+5.38
Danish People's Party	1,881	7.78	-0.60
Moderates	1,080	4.47	New
Social Liberals	1,066	4.41	-1.46
Red–Green Alliance	619	2.56	-0.38
The Alternative	287	1.19	-0.33
Total	24,181		

2019 European Parliament election in Denmark

Parties	Vote		
Parties	Votes	%	+ / -
Venstre	13,614	47.10	+25.41
Social Democrats	5,388	18.64	-0.70
Green Left	2,458	8.50	+0.36
Danish People's Party	2,421	8.38	-20.94
Social Liberals	1,698	5.87	+0.96
Conservatives	858	2.97	-6.13
Red–Green Alliance	850	2.94	New
People's Movement against the EU	754	2.61	-2.71
The Alternative	438	1.52	New
Liberal Alliance	427	1.48	-0.70
Total	28,906		

2014 European Parliament election in Denmark

Parties	Vote		
Parties	Votes	%	+ / -
Danish People's Party	6,788	29.32	+15.03
Venstre	5,021	21.69	-5.04
Social Democrats	4,478	19.34	+0.20
Conservatives	2,106	9.10	-5.62
Green Left	1,884	8.14	-5.13
People's Movement against the EU	1,231	5.32	-0.11
Social Liberals	1,137	4.91	+0.69
Liberal Alliance	504	2.18	+1.68
Total	23,149		

2009 European Parliament election in Denmark

Parties	Vote		
Parties	Votes	%	+ / -
Venstre	6,469	26.73	-1.65
Social Democrats	4,633	19.14	-13.81
Conservatives	3,563	14.72	+5.63
Danish People's Party	3,457	14.29	+8.49
Green Left	3,211	13.27	+8.20
People's Movement against the EU	1,313	5.43	+2.13
Social Liberals	1,022	4.22	-0.78
June Movement	411	1.70	-4.81
Liberal Alliance	121	0.50	New
Total	24,200		

2004 European Parliament election in Denmark

Parties	Vote		
Parties	Votes	%	+ / -
Social Democrats	9,228	32.95	+18.45
Venstre	7,947	28.38	-2.58
Conservatives	2,545	9.09	+0.63
June Movement	1,823	6.51	-7.69
Danish People's Party	1,624	5.80	+0.63
Green Left	1,420	5.07	-1.34
Social Liberals	1,401	5.00	-2.60
Christian Democrats	1,090	3.89	-0.81
People's Movement against the EU	925	3.30	-1.79
Total	28,003		

1999 European Parliament election in Denmark

Parties	Vote		
Parties	Votes	%	+ / -
Venstre	8,436	30.96	+6.43
Social Democrats	3,952	14.50	-0.71
June Movement	3,870	14.20	-1.25
Conservatives	2,305	8.46	-10.91
Social Liberals	2,071	7.60	+0.85
Green Left	1,748	6.41	+1.43
Danish People's Party	1,410	5.17	New
People's Movement against the EU	1,387	5.09	-1.59
Christian Democrats	1,282	4.70	+1.89
Centre Democrats	790	2.90	+2.02
Progress Party	248	0.91	-2.43
Total	27,251		

1994 European Parliament election in Denmark

Parties	Vote		
Parties	Votes	%	+ / -
Venstre	7,383	24.53	-4.33
Conservatives	5,830	19.37	+9.75
June Movement	4,652	15.45	New
Social Democrats	4,580	15.21	-4.32
Social Liberals	2,032	6.75	+4.12
People's Movement against the EU	2,010	6.68	-4.56
Green Left	1,499	4.98	-0.73
Progress Party	1,006	3.34	-2.98
Christian Democrats	847	2.81	-3.29
Centre Democrats	264	0.88	-9.12
Total	30,103		

1989 European Parliament election in Denmark

Parties	Vote		
Parties	Votes	%	+ / -
Venstre	7,095	28.86	+2.01
Social Democrats	4,801	19.53	+3.36
People's Movement against the EU	2,763	11.24	-2.90
Centre Democrats	2,458	10.00	+1.48
Conservatives	2,366	9.62	-6.15
Progress Party	1,553	6.32	+2.56
Christian Democrats	1,499	6.10	-0.43
Green Left	1,404	5.71	+0.24
Social Liberals	646	2.63	+0.23
Total	24,585		

1984 European Parliament election in Denmark

Parties	Vote	
Parties	Votes	%
Venstre	7,718	26.85
Social Democrats	4,649	16.17
Conservatives	4,534	15.77
People's Movement against the EU	4,066	14.14
Centre Democrats	2,448	8.52
Christian Democrats	1,877	6.53
Green Left	1,573	5.47
Progress Party	1,081	3.76
Social Liberals	690	2.40
Left Socialists	112	0.39
Total	28,748	

== Referendums ==
2022 Danish European Union opt-out referendum

Option	Votes	%
✓ YES	18,529	66.15
X NO	9,482	33.85

2015 Danish European Union opt-out referendum

Option	Votes	%
X NO	15,826	50.71
✓ YES	15,383	49.29

2014 Danish Unified Patent Court membership referendum

Option	Votes	%
✓ YES	14,711	65.03
X NO	7,910	34.97

2009 Danish Act of Succession referendum

Option	Votes	%
✓ YES	20,000	85.76
X NO	3,320	14.24

2000 Danish euro referendum

Option	Votes	%
X NO	26,062	51.34
✓ YES	24,697	48.66

1998 Danish Amsterdam Treaty referendum

Option	Votes	%
✓ YES	25,789	59.28
X NO	17,718	40.72

1993 Danish Maastricht Treaty referendum

Option	Votes	%
✓ YES	31,422	63.68
X NO	17,918	36.32

1992 Danish Maastricht Treaty referendum

Option	Votes	%
✓ YES	25,454	53.84
X NO	21,823	46.16

1986 Danish Single European Act referendum

Option	Votes	%
✓ YES	29,100	68.48
X NO	13,397	31.52

1972 Danish European Communities membership referendum

Option	Votes	%
✓ YES	30,348	73.34
X NO	11,034	26.66

1953 Danish constitutional and electoral age referendum

Option	Votes	%
✓ YES	7,220	75.08
X NO	2,397	24.92
23 years	6,450	64.92
21 years	3,485	35.08

1939 Danish constitutional referendum

Option	Votes	%
✓ YES	3,581	85.32
X NO	616	14.68
