= Preben =

Preben is a given name of Slavic origin most common in Denmark where it arrived around 1350 from the neighbouring Germany. The name was Pridbjørn in medieval Danish, derived from the Slavic name Pritbor.

Notable people with the name include:

- Preben von Ahnen (1606–1675), German-born civil servant and landowner in Norway
- Preben Arentoft (born 1942), Danish former football player
- Preben Fjære Brynemo (born 1977), Norwegian Nordic combined skier
- Preben Christiansen (1913–1979), Danish fencer
- Preben Dabelsteen (1925–2017), Danish badminton player
- Preben Eriksen (born 1958), former speedway rider
- Preben Fabricius (1931–1984), Danish furniture designer, worked with Jørgen Kastholm
- Preben Møller Hansen (1929–2008), Danish writer, cook, politician, and trade unionist
- Preben Harris (born 1935), Danish film and stage actor
- Preben Van Hecke (born 1982), Belgian professional road bicycle racer
- Preben Hertoft (1928–2017), Danish psychiatrist, professor in medical sexology, senior doctorate in medicine
- Preben Isaksson (1943–2008), Danish cyclist
- Preben Jensen (born 1944), Danish sprint canoeist
- Preben Kaas (1930–1981), Danish comedian, actor, script writer and film director
- Preben Krab (born 1952), Danish rower who competed in the 1968 Summer Olympics
- Preben Kristensen (born 1953), Danish actor
- Preben Lundgren Kristensen (1923–1986), Danish cyclist
- Preben Elkjær (born 1957), retired Danish professional footballer
- Preben Lundbye (born 1950), Danish football coach
- Preben Maegaard (1935–2021), Danish renewable energy pioneer, author and expert
- Preben Mahrt (1920–1989), Danish film actor
- Preben De Man (born 1996), Belgian professional footballer
- Preben Munthe (1922–2013), Norwegian economist
- Preben Neergaard (1920–1990), Danish stage and film actor
- Preben Philipsen (1910–2005), Danish film producer
- Eilert Waldemar Preben Ramm (1769–1837), Norwegian military officer and politician
- Preben Lerdorff Rye (1917–1995), Danish film actor
- Axel Schmidt-Preben (1939–2018), Brazilian sailor
- Erik Schmidt-Preben (born 1939), Brazilian sailor
- Preben Uglebjerg (1931–1968), Danish film actor
- Preben Vildalen (born 1972), Norwegian handball player
