= De Man =

De Man is a Dutch surname, meaning "the man". The agglutinated form Deman is most common in West Flanders. People with this surname include:

- Cornelis de Man (1621–1706), Dutch Golden Age painter
- Dick de Man (1909–1996), Dutch swimmer
- Filip De Man (born 1955), Belgian politician and journalist
- Harald de Man (born 1973), Dutch skier
- Hendrik de Man, also known as Henri de Man (1885–1953), Belgian politician
- Herman de Man (1898–1946), Dutch novelist, pseudonym of Salomon Herman Hamburger
- Johannes Govertus de Man (1850–1930), Dutch biologist
- Joris de Man (born 1972), Dutch video game composer and sound designer
- Mark De Man (born 1983), Belgian footballer
- Paul de Man (1919–1983), Belgian literary critic
- Preben De Man (born 1996), Belgian footballer
- Robert De Man (1900–1978), Belgian politician and Government Minister
- Roderik de Man (born 1941), Dutch composer
- Roelof de Man (1634–1663), Dutch administrator of the Cape Colony

== See also ==
- Demann
