= Deman (surname) =

Deman is a surname. Notable people with the surname include:

- Olivier Deman (born 2000), Belgian footballer
- Paul Deman (1889–1961), Belgian cyclist
- Robert Deman (born 1946), American actor

== See also ==
- De Man
- Demann
- Geman
