= Thorkil Vanggaard =

- Born: 1910
- Died: 1998 (aged 87–88)
- Occupation: Psychiatrist

Thorkil Vanggaard (1910–1998) was a Danish psychiatrist and doctor.

After becoming an MD in 1938, Vanggaard obtained the higher doctorate in 1941. After the war he studied psychoanalysis in the United States and in 1960 became a senior physician at Rigshospitalet.

Although his critics have called him arrogant and a male chauvinist, fellow psychiatrist Preben Hertoft in his memoirs described both good and bad qualities of Vanggaard.

In the 1970s, he wrote an article called "Eros and Power", which provoked an outcry from feminists who called for his removal as a senior MD.

In the 80s and 90s, he was critical of the focus on incest, which he saw as a fashion phenomenon, declaring that psychologists and teachers were hypnotized by incest and seeing connections between common mental illnesses and child sexual abuse, where none existed. In the middle of a televised debate, he left the studio, declaring that the debate was frivolous.

Vanggaard introduced the concept of borderline and schizotypal disorders to Denmark.

== Selected books ==
- Phallós: A Symbol and Its History in the Male World. New York: International Universities Press. 1972. ISBN 978-0823641352.
- Borderlands of Sanity: Neuroses, Schizophrenic Borderline States, Atypical Endogenous Depression. Copenhagen: Munksgaard. 1979. ISBN 978-8716084095.
