= Danish Seamen's Union =

Danish trade union

The Danish Seamen's Union was a trade union representing sailors and other workers ships in the Danish merchant navy.

The union was founded in 1897, and joined the Danish Confederation of Trade Unions (LO) in 1900. However, the union was generally more radical and left-wing than the LO, and so in 1912 it left the federation. It joined the International Transport Workers' Federation in 1928, and rejoined LO in 1937.

After World War II, the union's membership entered a long-term decline, with smaller crews and many ships using flags of convenience. In 1975, the union again left the LO, following a dispute about quotas. By 1987, it had only 5,000 members, and by 1990, only 3,000. In 1994, it merged into the Danish General Workers' Union.

== See also ==
- Preben Møller Hansen
