= Geman =

Geman is a surname. Notable people with the surname include:

- Donald Geman (born 1943), American mathematician
- Hélyette Geman (born 1950), French academic in finance
- Stuart Geman (born 1949), American mathematician, brother of Donald

== See also ==
- German (disambiguation)
