= Preben Møller Hansen =

Danish writer, cook and politician (1929–2008)

Preben Møller Hansen (September 6, 1929 – September 11, 2008) was a Danish politician, trade unionist, writer and cook. As chairman of Sømændenes Forbund (the Danish Seamen's Union), he earned the nickname Sømandsbossen ('the Sailors' Boss') in Denmark and was well known for his populist manners, including frequent swearing and anti-elitist remarks.

== Life and work ==
Preben Møller Hansen was born in Brønshøj into a religious family. His father was a sexton and his mother wished for Preben to become a priest, but he believed religion to be superstition and became a sailor. He first joined with an EAC ship at the age of 16. During the strikes of 1956, seasoned stewards Jakob Rasmussen and Svend Petersen put him in charge of a sailor's strike. Because of his role in organizing the strike, he was arrested and imprisoned in Vestre Prison, where he was held for ten days before the Seaman's Federation's lawyer got him released.

Møller Hansen was made chairman of the Seaman's Federation in 1968, and was responsible for the union's shift toward communism and a less compromising stance towards employers. In 1976 he was elected to the Copenhagen City Council standing for the Communist Party (DKP).

After a controversy with another union (HK/Denmark, then known as the Commercial and Clerical Employees) involving reimbursement for services rendered to the Seaman's Federation, he was expelled from DKP in 1979. He began planning to form a new party with other disgruntled DKP members; this party would be known as Fælles Kurs (Common Course), and held its first congress in 1986. In the national parliamentary election of 1987, Common Course gained 2.2% of the votes and four seats, one of which was held by Hansen. Hansen had a difficult time adjusting to the culture of the Folktinget, and his brief tenure in parliament was marked by icy relations with the leaders of other parties.

In the 1988 election one year later, Common Course fell out of parliament, achieving 1.9% of the vote and thus failing to pass the 2% election threshold. Following this disappointment, Hansen returned to the Copenhagen City Council in 1994, where he was elected standing for Common Course, and would remain elected until the party's dissolution in 2001.

In 1985, Møller Hansen unexpectedly arrived with half a million krone in a cardboard box to give to striking brewery workers. He claimed he received it from a man on the street.

After the party's dissolution he became the manager of a traditional inn in Copenhagen, together with his daughter Janni Pedersen. He was often found cooking in the kitchen, favoring traditional Danish food "as mother used to make it". In 2001, he wrote the cookbook Den danske kogebog (The Danish Cookbook) reflecting his lifelong love of cooking.

== Bibliography ==
- Hansen, Preben Møller (1972): Sømændenes Forbund – udvikling og fremskridt gennem 75 år, Sømændenes Forbund (in Danish) OCLC 465584070
  About the Seaman's Federation.
- Thomsen, Ulla Nygaard (1987): Sømandens kurs: portræt af Preben Møller Hansen, Ekstra Bladet (in Danish) ISBN 9788756743150
  Portrait of Møller Hansen.
- Hansen, Preben Møller (2001): Den danske kogebog, Askholms Forlag (in Danish) OCLC 872362501
