= Demann =

Demann or DeMann is a surname. Notable people with the surname include:

- Freddy DeMann (born 1939), American film producer and music executive
- Kristin Demann (born 1993), German footballer

== See also ==
- Deman (surname)
