= Preben De Man =

Belgian footballer (born 1996)

Personal information
- Date of birth: 27 September 1996 (age 30)
- Place of birth: Dendermonde, Belgium
- Height: 1.71 m (5 ft 7 in)
- Position: Winger

Team information
- Current team: FC Lebbeke
- Number: 7

Youth career
- –2013: Lokeren

Senior career*
Years	Team	Apps	(Gls)
2013–2015	Lokeren	1	(0)
2015–2018	Eendracht Aalst	56	(4)
2018–2020	Hamme	47	(11)
2020–2021	Lokeren-Temse	17	(0)
2022–2025	SC Dikkelvenne	87	(17)
2025–	FC Lebbeke	0	(0)

International career
2010–2011	Belgium U15	2	(0)
2012–2013	Belgium U17	6	(0)
2013–2014	Belgium U18	4	(0)
2013–2014	Belgium U19	4	(1)
- * Club domestic league appearances and goals as of 14:21, 21 January 2026 (UTC)

Preben De Man (born 27 September 1996) is a Belgian professional footballer who plays as a winger for Belgian club FC Lebbeke.

== Career ==
On 31 January 2022, De Man joined Belgian Division 2 club Dikkelvenne, coming over from league rivals Lokeren-Temse.
