= Preben Hertoft =

Danish psychiatrist and professor

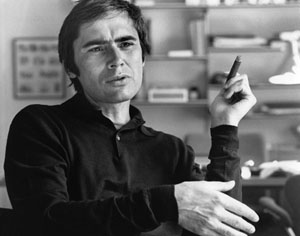
1973

Preben Hertoft (5 January 1928 – 26 February 2017), was a Danish psychiatrist and professor in medical sexology, senior doctorate in medicine.

After the death of his mentor Kirsten Auken, Hertoft worked over 40 years as a sexologist doing research, treatment, counseling and education. In 1986 he founded the first medical centre for sexology in Denmark. Most of the time he had heterosexual and homosexual patients with sexual problems in therapy, but he also treated and counselled transvestites and pedophiles.

He was elected a fellow by the Society for the Scientific Study of Sex for outstanding contributions to the field.

== Selected works ==
- Preben Hertoft: Paradiset er ikke til salg [Paradise is not for sale - on transvestites]
- Preben Hertoft: Klinisk sexologi [Medical sexology]
- Preben Hertoft et al.: Paedagogisk sexologi [Educational sexology]
