= Common Course =

Common Course Fælles Kurs (Arbejderpartiet Fælles Kurs)
- Leader: Preben Møller Hansen
- Founded: 1979 (movement); 1986 (party)
- Dissolved: 2003
- Split from: Communist Party of Denmark
- Merged into: Communist Party of Denmark
- Headquarters: Copenhagen
- Newspaper: Fælles Kurs
- Youth wing: Ungdom Fælles Kurs
- Ideology: Left-wing nationalism Communism; Euroscepticism; Left-wing populism After 1990: Left-conservatism
- Political position: Left-wing to far-left
- National affiliation: Common Course-Welfare Party (1990)

Common Course Workers' Party (Danish: Arbejderpartiet Fælles Kurs), more commonly known as Common Course (Danish: Fælles Kurs (FK)), was a Eurosceptic political party in Denmark led by Preben Møller Hansen, which held 4 seats in the Danish parliament from 1987 to 1988.

It was formed out of the communist wing of maritime workers' unions and initially envisaged a front of progressive left-wing parties, before becoming a political party in 1986. It tried to appeal to urban workers, farmers, and pensioners, and idealised a past Denmark that 'put people in the centre', a tradition which it claimed the European Economic Community was 'destroying'.

Its brief time in the parliament ended due to a split vote on the left, and the party's perceived conservative slants led it to create an ill-fated alliance with right-wing politician Mogens Glistrup in 1990. The rise of more viable left-wing parties spelled the end for Common Course.

1987 Danish Folketing, Common Course, (Fælles Kurs) 4 seats.

== History ==
In 1960, the communist factions of the sailors’ and deckhands’ unions began publishing a newspaper called ‘Common Course’. Most prominent in these factions was the leader of the Danish Seamens' Union, Preben Møller Hansen. He was known for his outspoken way of expressing himself, frequently using swear words, making broad generalizations and anti-elitist statements.

The supporters of Common Course were kicked out of the Communist Party of Denmark (KPD) in 1979, after prolonged criticism of the party by Møller Hansen for its co-operation with the Social Democrats. They formed the Common Course Clubs, a movement representing mainly maritime workers and pensioners, but with the goal of creating a united front of progressive parties.

In 1986, it became its own party, the Common Course Workers’ Party. In the 1987 general election, it won four seats in the Folketing, three of which were held by Seamens’ Union members. However, in the 1988 snap election, it fell below the electoral threshold by 0.1%, and lost its representation. The three contesting far-left parties, Common Course, the Communist Party and the Left Socialists (VS), amassed a total of 3.33% of the votes. After the disappointing election, the Communists expressed their wish to build a common alliance of progressive parties, including the far-left, which echoed Common Course's original goals.

However, negotiations to create this alliance were difficult. The Left Socialists, and the smaller Socialist Workers Party (SAP), were critical of FK's opposition to migrant workers. Because of their previous grievances, much of the DKP did not want to associate with FK either. Serious doubt was also cast onto the longevity of a new left alliance, as the DKP's strict Marxism–Leninism clashed with VS's libertarian socialist factions.

In a tactical move, for the 1990 elections, FK ran on a joint list (Note: (officially just that of FK, as joint lists are not an occurrence in Denmark)) with the small Welfare Party, led by Mogens Glistrup, creator of the far-right Progress Party from which he had been suspended. Not only did this lock them out of the eventual agreed left-wing alliance, the Red-Green Alliance, but it led to another failure, as Common Course's list only won 1.79% of the vote, failing to pass into the Folketing yet again. This also ruined the Red-Greens’ chances, as they also fell short of the threshold.

Common Course began to fall apart, losing the support of the Seamens’ Union in 1994, the same year they stood down from the general election. In the same election, the RGA won 6 seats in the Folketing, thanks to an influx of former voters from FK, but also the Socialist Peoples’ Party, who were criticised for their increasing acceptance of the EU.

The party kept its sole seat, held by Møller Hansen, on the Copenhagen City Council until 2001. In 2003, its final conference was held, where Møller Hansen expressed his wishes for another communist party to rise in the country, and proclaimed that the dream for a ‘common course’ was still alive. The party subsequently folded.

Former member of Danish parliament Line Barfod (Red-Green Alliance) was a former member of Common Course, and was chairperson of its youth wing in the years 1984–1985, before the actual formation of the party.

== Ideology ==
Common Course described itself as the party of “employees, pensioners and young people”. It wanted to build a united front of progressive parties and chose the name ‘Common Course’ to reflect this.

The party itself gathered both communists and left-wing socialists, united in an inveterate struggle against Denmark's membership of the European Communities. The party's policy was described as having “populist and nationalist elements”, pledging to “do everything to awaken the "Holger Danske" that lives deep within us all”. The party took a moderate line on immigration, supporting asylum seekers but preferring not to take in migrant workers. In 1990, this changed to a restrictive line.

The party hailed the achievements of the Danish working class while decrying the destruction of the “solidarity system” wreaked by capitalists.

=== Foreign policy ===
The party was a strong opponent to the European Economic Community. It blamed the EEC for unleashing “opportunist” capitalists onto the country who destroyed its tradition of “putting people at the centre”. The party did not contest European elections, with the People's Movement Against the European Community sharing its left-wing Eurosceptic views.

Despite a nationalist appeal, the party initially had a strong sense of international solidarity. It pledged to educate children against racism through initiatives of international organisations, like the United Nations. The party actively supported communist regimes in the Soviet Union, Cuba, and North Korea, as well as Colonel Muammar al-Gaddafi in Libya, and was a collective member of organisations supporting these nations. with party officials befriending Chinese and North Korean ambassadors.

Before 1990, Common Course was strongly in favour of welcoming and helping all people fleeing oppression and war. At the same time, it rejected the legitimacy of Eastern Bloc dissenters being “refugees”, calling them out for moving to Denmark out of pure political convenience instead of fleeing war. It stipulated that “refugees and guest workers we accept must be treated like everyone else in the country and have the same rights and obligations, including the obligation to learn Danish”. At the same time, the party was against the EEC's free movement of non-unionised workers, including migrant workers, fearing that the community would use this as an excuse to stifle wages. However, by 1990, Møller Hansen tightened the party's views on migration, for example, proclaiming that he was against foreigners being educated in Denmark, in order to prioritise the education of Danes.

Common Course pledged to completely abolish the Danish military to raise 17 billion kroner each year and create “a neutral Denmark in a nuclear-free Nordic region”. It supported the creation of a new Disaster Response Corps, a strengthened version of the country's civil defence system which would including the ambulance and fire defence systems. This corps would also give international aid during disasters. It pledged to withdraw Denmark from NATO immediately. It also demanded a referendum on EEC membership.

=== Domestic policy ===
The party supported “the most decentralisation as possible”. It wanted to cut government ministries to ten and introduce frequent referendums. It supported ending pay-raises for government officials, while giving full pay to local politicians. It pledged to hold general elections every three years, and abolish the 2% threshold which ultimately spelled the party's downfall.

Common Course was a strongly anti-capitalist party. It promised to “eliminate the root of all evil - the right of one person to exploit another”. It wanted the tax-free threshold to be increased to DKK 60,000 annually, and increase taxes on large corporations by 15%. Meanwhile, it pledged to scrap VAT on food and medicine.

The party emphasised the development of children. It supported 1 year paid maternity leave. It advocated for free education, including a totally free nursery, kindergarten and after-school system. It emphasised the role of musical, artistic and athletic subjects in the first ten years of schooling and pledged to increase pedagogical understanding in the education sector, while introducing an education system based on social solidarity. Its ideal system involved making children go onto school trips to fisheries, farms and factories to “experience how society works”. It also supported an “education allowance” after the age of 15.

The party supported greater investment in medical research, and an end to the exclusion of unemployed and ill people from society. It supported a raise in healthcare budget by 10%, or approximately 3.5 billion kroner. It demanded all hospitals to be in public ownership, and to protect local hospitals from decline. It demanded completely free healthcare, including dental care, nursing and medical transport, and supported preventative healthcare. It pledged to build housing for seniors and youth until demands were met.

The party also pledged basic income of DKK 5,500 for the elderly and sick, and supported a basic income for artists. It also supported greater rights for pensioners, with an eight-point programme:

- Free housing
- Free public transport
- Free medicine and medical care
- Free home help and home care
- Exemption from paying TV licence
- Subsidised telephone costs
- One year's worth of free adult education
- The same holiday pay as workers

The party supported freeing sport from profit margins and separating local community sport from professional spectator sport.

Common Course was an environmentalist party, supporting the work of organisations such as Greenpeace, and supported a gradual fair transition away from coal-fired power plants, and ruled out nuclear energy. The party also tried to appeal to rural voters. It pledged to build large greenhouses in every county, and use Danish energy. The party was against following the European Community's common fishing policy.
