= The Greens (Denmark) =

The Greens De Grønne
- Founded: October 1983
- Dissolved: December 2014
- Ideology: Green politics
- International affiliation: European Green Party (until 2008)

The Greens (De Grønne) was a Danish green political party active from 1983 to 2014.

The founding of a nationwide Danish green party was first seriously proposed at a 1980 meeting of activists from local environmental groups. Subsequently a formal call for the formation of the party was published in August 1982, resulting in a meeting of around 50 people which led to the founding of the party in October 1983. Shortly after its founding a rival ecological party, Danmarks Miljøpartiet, was established in September 1984 in Aarhus: this had around 50 members concentrated in north Jutland. The two parties spent two years negotiating over terms for a merger, a process that was ultimately fruitless. In the meantime, the Greens collected the 20,000 signatures required to register for national elections: their registration was approved in December 1984.

Early members of the party tended not to have previously been members of other parties, instead mostly being drawn from the environmental movement and the movement that had emerged around Niels Meyer, Kristen Helveg Petersen and Villy Sørensen's book Revolt from the Centre, published in 1978, which challenged the growth of the far left and far right in 1970s Denmark with a politics of the middle ground that emphasised ecologically sustainable development.

The party contested three general elections - in 1987, 1988 and 1990 - without winning seats in the Folketing, but it won a small number of municipal and county council seats across the 1985, 1989 and 1993 local election cycles. In the 1985 local elections they won 12 and six seats on municipal and county councils respectively, earning the party media attention and inclusion in opinion polls, where it would usually score 2-3 percent of the vote. It also outpolled Danmarks Miljøpartiet in the latter's stronghold, winning 277 votes to the smaller party's 32 in the north Jutland town of Frederikshavn. In its first general election in 1987, the party scored 1.3 percent of the vote, a result Sara Parkin ascribed to the effort spent on merger negotiations and collecting signatures at the expense of debating ideas and on-the-ground organisation. They failed to improve on this in the following year's parliamentary election, despite Denmark's policy of not allowing nuclear weapons on Danish territory or ports being a key issue.

Parkin has characterised the party's organisation as highly decentralised, with spokespeople being bound by decisions made at infrequent meetings. She highlighted the advocacy of many policies supported by green parties by the Socialist People's Party as a barrier to the Greens' success, whilst also noting that many Green members believed that the movement around Revolt from the Centre was a bigger obstacle, in particular Niels Meyer, who consistently argued against establishing a green party.

The party was a member of the European Green Party (EGP) until 2008, when it was expelled. It dissolved in December 2014.

== See also ==
- Green party
- Green politics
- List of environmental organizations
