= Humanist Party (Denmark) =

Political party in Denmark

The Humanist Party (Danish: Det Humanistiske Parti) was a political party in Denmark and a member of the Humanist International. Although the party has never had a member elected to the Folketing, a member was elected in a local election in 1989.

== History ==
The party was established in 1987 and participated the general election held that year. It received 5,675 votes, or approximately 0.2% of the total votes cast. In the 1990 Danish general election the party received 763 votes, just 0.02% of the total votes cast. The last time the party ran in the general election was 1993.

At the beginning of the 2000s the party was headed by Christian Adamsen. It stood in the regional and municipal elections in Denmark 15 November 2005.
