= 1987 Danish general election =

- 8 September 1987
- All 179 seats in the Folketing; 90 seats needed for a majority
- Turnout: 86.74%
Party	Leader	Vote %	Seats	+/–
Social Democrats	Anker Jørgensen	29.32	54	−2
Conservatives	Poul Schlüter	20.84	38	−4
SF	Gert Petersen	14.58	27	+6
Venstre	Uffe Ellemann-Jensen	10.54	19	−3
Social Liberals	Niels Helveg Petersen	6.22	11	+1
Centre Democrats	Erhard Jakobsen	4.79	9	+1
Progress	Johannes Sørensen	4.77	9	+3
KrF	Christian Christensen	2.37	4	−1
Common Course	Preben Møller Hansen	2.16	4	New
Elected in the Faroe Islands
People's	Jógvan Sundstein	28.84	1	0
Social Democratic	Atli Dam	24.68	1	+1
Elected in Greenland
Siumut	Jonathan Motzfeldt	43.28	1	0
Atassut	Otto Steenholdt	41.30	1	0
This lists parties that won seats. See the complete results below.

Government before	Government after election
Schlüter I K–V–CD–KrF	Schlüter II; K–V–CD–KrF

General elections were held in Denmark on 8 September 1987. The Social Democratic Party remained the largest in the Folketing with 54 of the 179 seats. The Conservative People's Party-led coalition government lost its majority, but since the parties on the left did not have a majority to form their own government, the incumbent government was able to continue as a minority coalition government. Voter turnout was 87% in Denmark proper, 69% in the Faroe Islands and 45% in Greenland.

== Results ==
Party	Votes	%	Seats	+/–
Denmark proper
Social Democrats	985,906	29.32	54	–2
Conservative People's Party	700,886	20.84	38	–4
Socialist People's Party	490,176	14.58	27	+6
Venstre	354,291	10.54	19	–3
Danish Social Liberal Party	209,086	6.22	11	+1
Centre Democrats	161,070	4.79	9	+1
Progress Party	160,461	4.77	9	+3
Christian People's Party	79,664	2.37	4	–1
Common Course	72,631	2.16	4	New
Left Socialists	46,141	1.37	0	–5
The Greens	45,076	1.34	0	New
Communist Party of Denmark	28,974	0.86	0	0
Justice Party of Denmark	16,359	0.49	0	0
Humanist Party	5,675	0.17	0	New
Socialist Workers Party	1,808	0.05	0	0
Communist Party of Denmark/Marxist–Leninists	987	0.03	0	0
Independents	3,366	0.10	0	0
Total	3,362,557	100.00	175	0
Valid votes	3,362,557	99.21		
Invalid/blank votes	26,644	0.79		
Total votes	3,389,201	100.00		
Registered voters/turnout	3,907,454	86.74		
Faroe Islands
People's Party	6,411	28.84	1	0
Social Democratic Party	5,486	24.68	1	+1
Union Party	5,345	24.05	0	–1
Republican Party	3,478	15.65	0	0
Self-Government	1,070	4.81	0	0
Progress Party	438	1.97	0	New
Total	22,228	100.00	2	0
Valid votes	22,228	99.30		
Invalid/blank votes	157	0.70		
Total votes	22,385	100.00		
Registered voters/turnout	32,484	68.91		
Greenland
Siumut	6,944	43.28	1	0
Atassut	6,627	41.30	1	0
Inuit Ataqatigiit	2,001	12.47	0	0
Polar Party	474	2.95	0	New
Total	16,046	100.00	2	0
Valid votes	16,046	94.50		
Invalid/blank votes	934	5.50		
Total votes	16,980	100.00		
Registered voters/turnout	37,800	44.92		
Source: Nohlen & Stöver

== See also ==
- List of members of the Folketing, 1987–1988
