= Results of the 2011 Danish general election in Denmark =

This is a list of the results in the 2011 Danish general election in Denmark. The results are as found on the official website dedicated to the results made by Statistics Denmark.

== Denmark ==
Division	A	B	C	F	I	K	O	V	Ø	Others	Red	Blue
Division	%	%	%	%	%	%	%	%	%	%	%	%
Denmark	24.8	9.5	4.9	9.2	5.0	0.8	12.3	26.7	6.7	0.1	50.2	49.8

== Vote share by electoral division ==
Division	A	B	C	F	I	K	O	V	Ø	Others	Red	Blue
Division	%	%	%	%	%	%	%	%	%	%	%	%
Mid & Northern Jutland	27.0	8.4	4.3	8.7	4.6	1.3	11.4	29.3	4.9	0.0	49.0	50.9
Zealand & Southern Denmark	25.6	7.4	4.5	9.2	4.5	0.6	14.7	28.2	5.2	0.0	47.4	52.6
Capital	21.4	13.3	6.2	9.8	5.9	0.4	10.4	22.1	10.5	0.1	55.0	45.0

== Vote share by constituency ==
Division	A	B	C	F	I	K	O	V	Ø	Others	Red	Blue
Division	%	%	%	%	%	%	%	%	%	%	%	%
North Jutland	30.3	6.9	5.4	8.7	4.0	0.8	12.1	27.4	4.4	0.0	50.3	49.7
West Jutland	23.0	7.3	3.8	8.1	4.9	2.9	12.2	34.3	3.5	0.0	41.9	58.1
East Jutland	27.2	10.4	3.7	9.0	4.9	0.6	10.4	27.3	6.3	0.0	53.0	47.0
South Jutland	24.1	6.6	4.0	7.7	4.9	1.0	14.8	33.1	3.8	0.0	42.3	57.7
Funen	28.4	8.4	5.1	10.5	4.2	0.4	12.3	24.3	6.3	0.1	53.6	46.4
Zealand	25.1	7.5	4.7	9.8	4.5	0.4	16.1	26.3	5.6	0.1	48.0	51.9
North Zealand	18.8	11.7	6.9	7.3	7.2	0.4	10.5	31.9	5.2	0.0	43.0	56.9
Greater Copenhagen	25.7	10.7	6.9	8.8	5.3	0.3	12.8	22.1	7.3	0.1	52.6	47.3
Copenhagen	18.9	16.7	5.5	12.4	5.8	0.3	8.4	15.2	16.6	0.1	64.7	35.2
Bornholm	35.8	5.5	2.1	7.3	1.9	2.5	10.9	26.7	7.3	0.0	56.0	44.0

== Vote share by nomination district ==
Division	A	B	C	F	I	K	O	V	Ø	Others	Red	Blue
Division	%	%	%	%	%	%	%	%	%	%	%	%
Frederikshavn	33.7	4.7	4.5	7.7	3.4	0.7	14.1	27.7	3.5	0.0	49.6	50.3
Hjørring	28.0	6.2	7.1	9.1	3.7	0.9	11.9	29.2	3.9	0.0	47.2	52.7
Brønderslev	31.5	5.9	5.4	8.1	3.8	0.9	12.5	28.3	3.4	0.0	49.0	51.0
Thisted	30.9	5.7	4.6	6.3	3.4	1.3	13.6	30.6	3.7	0.0	46.5	53.4
Himmerland	25.0	6.6	5.7	9.6	4.4	0.8	12.7	32.1	3.1	0.0	44.3	55.7
Mariagerfjord	30.5	6.4	4.9	7.3	4.4	0.9	13.0	29.1	3.6	0.0	47.7	52.3
Aalborg East	32.9	8.7	4.6	11.1	4.3	0.7	10.4	20.5	6.7	0.1	59.4	40.6
Aalborg West	28.0	9.1	6.2	9.4	4.8	0.6	9.6	26.5	5.8	0.0	52.2	47.7
Aalborg North	31.8	8.1	5.1	9.0	4.5	0.6	11.2	23.5	5.9	0.1	54.9	45.0
Struer	24.4	6.2	3.3	10.4	4.6	6.2	12.4	29.7	2.9	0.0	43.9	56.1
Skive	29.1	7.3	2.6	8.7	4.2	0.8	12.4	31.1	3.7	0.0	48.8	51.2
Viborg West	25.5	8.1	3.4	9.7	4.4	0.8	11.3	32.4	4.1	0.1	47.5	52.4
Viborg East	22.3	8.1	3.5	7.6	4.8	1.3	11.7	37.2	3.3	0.1	41.4	58.5
Silkeborg North	23.4	8.1	4.2	8.1	5.5	1.7	12.0	32.7	4.3	0.1	43.9	56.1
Silkeborg South	25.4	9.7	4.7	9.4	5.8	0.7	10.1	28.2	5.8	0.0	50.4	49.6
Ikast	21.6	6.0	4.7	6.0	4.6	1.7	16.1	36.4	2.7	0.1	36.3	63.6
Herning South	21.9	7.3	4.7	7.0	4.9	1.9	12.1	37.0	3.1	0.0	39.3	60.6
Herning North	18.0	7.0	4.3	5.8	5.0	3.5	12.2	41.8	2.4	0.0	33.1	66.8
Holstebro	24.2	6.8	3.8	8.8	5.3	6.8	11.1	29.7	3.5	0.1	43.3	56.6
Ringkøbing	17.5	5.7	3.3	7.1	4.3	5.1	13.3	41.3	2.3	0.0	32.5	67.4
Aarhus South	26.1	13.1	4.6	9.5	5.2	0.5	7.8	25.8	7.4	0.0	56.2	43.8
Aarhus West	30.3	11.5	3.6	10.0	4.1	0.6	9.9	21.9	8.0	0.1	59.8	40.1
Aarhus North	27.3	14.8	3.6	11.9	5.2	0.9	7.4	19.0	9.9	0.1	63.9	36.0
Aarhus East	21.7	16.7	4.5	10.6	6.3	0.6	6.0	23.9	9.7	0.0	58.8	41.2
Djurs	29.0	7.5	3.2	7.8	3.9	0.5	13.1	30.0	4.9	0.0	49.2	50.8
Randers North	36.6	5.4	2.7	7.5	3.3	0.6	12.1	27.6	4.2	0.0	53.7	46.3
Randers South	32.0	6.9	3.1	7.2	4.1	0.8	11.8	29.6	4.4	0.0	50.5	49.5
Favrskov	26.6	8.6	4.3	7.2	4.3	0.5	11.7	32.8	3.8	0.0	46.3	53.7
Skanderborg	25.8	9.8	4.1	9.1	4.7	0.4	10.0	30.9	5.2	0.0	49.9	50.0
Horsens	26.2	8.2	3.4	8.7	6.3	0.5	13.2	28.6	4.8	0.0	47.9	52.0
Hedensted	21.1	6.2	3.3	6.2	5.4	1.6	15.7	37.4	2.9	0.0	36.5	63.5
Sønderborg	27.4	5.9	5.1	7.1	4.4	0.5	15.4	31.1	3.1	0.0	43.5	56.5
Aabenraa	24.9	5.7	3.4	6.0	4.2	1.0	15.6	36.0	3.1	0.0	39.7	60.3
Tønder	24.3	5.4	3.6	6.9	4.7	1.8	13.8	36.5	2.9	0.0	39.5	60.5
City of Esbjerg	29.8	6.1	2.8	10.0	3.8	0.7	13.3	26.8	6.5	0.0	52.5	47.5
Greater Esbjerg	23.1	6.6	3.3	7.5	4.9	0.7	12.9	37.1	3.9	0.0	41.1	58.9
Varde	18.8	6.1	3.0	5.9	4.5	1.7	14.2	42.9	2.8	0.0	33.6	66.4
Vejen	21.9	5.6	3.6	6.0	5.1	1.2	15.3	38.9	2.5	0.1	35.9	64.0
Vejle North	20.2	9.0	4.5	7.3	5.3	1.1	17.7	31.2	3.5	0.0	40.1	59.9
Vejle South	24.0	8.2	4.2	8.4	5.8	1.1	15.9	27.7	4.7	0.0	45.3	54.7
Fredericia	30.4	6.2	3.9	7.9	4.4	0.9	15.2	26.7	4.5	0.0	49.0	51.0
Kolding North	20.5	8.2	5.1	9.4	6.3	0.7	12.9	32.6	4.3	0.0	42.4	57.6
Kolding South	21.5	7.4	5.5	10.0	5.4	1.2	15.3	29.6	4.0	0.0	42.9	57.1
Haderslev	24.2	6.2	3.7	8.4	5.1	1.3	13.8	33.4	3.9	0.0	42.6	57.4
Odense East	32.6	9.9	4.7	12.8	4.2	0.4	10.3	16.3	8.7	0.0	64.0	35.9
Odense West	30.1	8.5	6.1	10.6	4.1	0.3	12.2	21.4	6.7	0.0	55.9	44.1
Odense South	24.8	11.0	6.8	10.1	5.1	0.5	10.4	25.2	6.1	0.1	52.0	47.9
Assens	28.9	7.1	4.8	9.3	4.2	0.5	13.4	26.5	5.2	0.0	50.6	49.4
Middelfart	26.8	7.1	4.6	9.4	4.5	0.4	14.1	29.1	4.2	0.0	47.4	52.5
Nyborg	31.1	6.7	4.2	10.4	3.9	0.3	13.6	24.6	5.1	0.1	53.2	46.6
Svendborg	27.1	8.5	4.6	11.3	3.7	0.5	12.4	23.4	8.4	0.1	55.3	44.6
Faaborg	26.6	8.0	4.8	9.3	3.6	0.5	13.0	28.8	5.4	0.0	49.3	50.7
Lolland	31.2	4.2	3.2	18.3	2.7	0.3	15.3	19.5	5.3	0.1	58.9	41.0
Guldborgsund	31.7	5.6	3.9	10.3	3.1	0.5	16.0	23.3	5.6	0.0	53.2	46.7
Vordingborg	27.2	6.8	4.3	10.7	4.0	0.4	15.8	23.8	7.0	0.0	51.7	48.3
Næstved	28.8	6.7	5.3	8.9	4.3	0.5	15.3	24.8	5.2	0.0	49.7	50.2
Faxe	22.5	7.2	5.2	8.6	4.4	0.3	17.9	28.5	5.2	0.0	43.6	56.4
Køge	21.6	8.7	5.2	9.2	5.5	0.3	15.8	28.2	5.4	0.0	45.0	55.0
Greve	19.6	7.7	5.8	6.4	5.8	0.3	16.6	34.0	3.8	0.0	37.4	62.6
Roskilde	21.4	11.8	5.6	10.4	5.9	0.4	12.1	25.6	6.8	0.0	50.4	49.6
Holbæk	25.9	8.4	4.9	9.2	4.3	0.4	14.5	26.3	6.1	0.0	49.6	50.4
Kalundborg	25.0	6.4	3.3	9.7	3.3	0.4	19.4	26.5	5.9	0.0	47.0	53.0
Ringsted	24.3	8.2	4.6	8.9	4.9	0.5	16.1	26.7	5.8	0.1	47.2	52.8
Slagelse	25.7	6.1	4.1	9.7	4.6	0.3	18.3	25.6	5.4	0.2	46.9	52.9
Helsingør	23.6	11.0	6.3	8.6	6.1	0.2	11.8	25.9	6.4	0.0	49.6	50.3
Fredensborg	14.6	12.1	10.3	5.9	9.0	0.3	9.0	35.0	3.8	0.0	36.4	63.6
Hillerød	19.1	10.6	5.1	7.5	5.8	0.9	11.3	33.9	5.8	0.0	43.0	57.0
Frederikssund	23.7	8.0	3.8	9.0	5.0	0.4	14.1	29.9	6.0	0.0	46.7	53.3
Egedal	19.7	13.1	6.8	7.1	7.3	0.2	10.1	30.5	5.2	0.0	45.1	54.9
Rudersdal	12.8	15.0	9.5	5.9	10.0	0.3	6.9	35.2	4.3	0.0	38.0	62.0
Gentofte	11.9	15.1	15.0	4.8	10.2	0.3	6.9	30.8	5.1	0.0	36.8	63.2
Lyngby	18.0	15.9	9.6	8.0	7.6	0.3	8.3	26.4	5.9	0.0	47.8	52.1
Gladsaxe	26.0	12.7	5.4	9.7	4.7	0.4	11.6	20.3	9.2	0.1	57.5	42.4
Rødovre	31.4	8.8	4.8	9.8	3.8	0.6	14.3	18.5	8.1	0.1	58.1	41.8
Hvidovre	28.7	8.5	4.2	10.4	3.9	0.3	16.5	18.9	8.6	0.1	56.0	43.9
Brøndby	30.1	7.8	5.1	9.7	3.7	0.3	16.1	20.4	6.8	0.1	54.4	45.5
Taastrup	28.8	9.1	5.4	10.1	3.7	0.3	14.1	20.1	8.4	0.1	56.3	43.6
Ballerup	31.8	8.2	4.6	8.4	4.2	0.4	15.1	20.5	6.8	0.1	55.1	44.7
Easterbro	17.9	19.4	6.3	11.4	7.1	0.3	6.1	16.7	14.8	0.1	63.5	36.5
Sundvester	19.5	16.5	4.6	12.4	6.6	0.2	8.9	15.2	16.0	0.1	64.3	35.5
Indre By	13.8	21.0	6.7	11.6	8.2	0.2	4.2	15.7	18.5	0.1	64.9	35.0
Sundbyøster	20.3	15.3	3.7	13.2	5.4	0.3	9.7	15.7	16.3	0.2	65.0	34.8
Nørrebro	16.2	20.0	3.1	15.2	4.5	0.2	4.7	8.4	27.6	0.1	79.0	20.9
Bispebjerg	21.5	14.2	4.0	14.0	4.6	0.4	9.6	11.2	20.3	0.1	70.0	29.8
Brønshøj	22.7	13.5	4.7	13.5	4.5	0.4	11.1	14.6	14.9	0.1	64.6	35.3
Valby	23.1	14.0	4.4	13.0	4.9	0.3	10.3	15.1	14.7	0.1	64.8	35.1
Vesterbro	17.4	19.3	3.7	14.0	5.6	0.3	6.1	10.8	22.8	0.1	73.5	26.4
Falkoner	15.6	20.4	9.9	10.4	7.2	0.2	6.1	17.7	12.4	0.0	58.8	41.1
Slots	17.7	17.2	9.4	10.7	6.8	0.3	7.9	18.1	11.9	0.1	57.4	42.5
Tårnby	22.6	8.4	5.6	8.9	4.8	0.3	17.4	24.8	7.1	0.1	47.0	53.0
Rønne	39.3	5.6	2.3	7.3	1.8	2.1	10.2	24.7	6.7	0.0	58.9	41.1
Aakirkeby	32.5	5.5	1.9	7.4	1.9	2.9	11.5	28.7	7.8	0.0	53.2	46.8

== Vote share by region ==
Division	A	B	C	F	I	K	O	V	Ø	Others	Red	Blue
Division	%	%	%	%	%	%	%	%	%	%	%	%
North Denmark	30.3	6.9	5.4	8.7	4.0	0.8	12.1	27.4	4.4	0.0	50.3	49.7
Central Denmark	25.5	9.2	3.8	8.6	4.9	1.6	11.1	30.1	5.2	0.0	48.5	51.5
Southern Denmark	25.9	7.4	4.4	8.8	4.6	0.8	13.8	29.5	4.8	0.0	46.9	53.0
Zealand	25.1	7.5	4.7	9.8	4.5	0.4	16.1	26.3	5.6	0.1	48.0	51.9
Capital	21.4	13.3	6.2	9.8	5.9	0.4	10.4	22.1	10.5	0.1	54.9	45.0

== Vote share by municipality ==
Division	A	B	C	F	I	K	O	V	Ø	Others	Red	Blue
Division	%	%	%	%	%	%	%	%	%	%	%	%
Frederikshavn	33.9	4.7	4.5	7.8	3.4	0.7	13.9	27.7	3.4	0.0	49.8	50.2
Læsø	28.0	5.9	3.6	6.9	2.8	0.7	19.0	28.4	4.7	0.0	45.5	54.5
Hjørring	28.0	6.2	7.1	9.1	3.7	0.9	11.9	29.2	3.9	0.0	47.2	52.7
Brønderslev	30.9	6.3	5.8	8.3	4.1	0.9	11.7	28.4	3.6	0.0	49.1	50.9
Jammerbugt	32.1	5.5	5.1	8.0	3.6	0.9	13.3	28.3	3.2	0.0	48.9	51.1
Thisted	29.2	5.8	5.2	6.1	3.0	1.5	14.1	31.2	3.7	0.0	44.9	55.1
Morsø	34.3	5.4	3.5	6.6	4.1	0.9	12.4	29.2	3.7	0.0	49.9	50.0
Vesthimmerland Municipality	22.8	5.7	5.9	10.9	3.9	0.9	13.7	33.6	2.6	0.0	42.1	57.9
Rebild	27.7	7.8	5.6	7.9	4.9	0.7	11.4	30.2	3.6	0.0	47.1	52.9
Mariagerfjord	30.5	6.4	4.9	7.3	4.4	0.9	13.0	29.1	3.6	0.0	47.7	52.3
Aalborg	31.0	8.7	5.3	9.9	4.5	0.6	10.4	23.3	6.1	0.0	55.7	44.2
Lemvig	20.2	6.3	3.1	11.1	5.0	6.9	13.5	31.2	2.8	0.0	40.4	59.6
Struer	28.4	6.1	3.4	9.8	4.2	5.5	11.3	28.2	3.1	0.0	47.3	52.7
Skive	29.1	7.3	2.6	8.7	4.2	0.8	12.4	31.1	3.7	0.0	48.8	51.2
Viborg	24.0	8.1	3.5	8.7	4.6	1.0	11.5	34.7	3.8	0.1	44.6	55.3
Silkeborg	24.5	8.9	4.5	8.8	5.6	1.2	11.0	30.4	5.1	0.0	47.2	52.7
Ikast-Brande	21.6	6.0	4.7	6.0	4.6	1.7	16.1	36.4	2.7	0.1	36.3	63.6
Herning	19.9	7.1	4.5	6.4	5.0	2.7	12.2	39.5	2.8	0.0	36.1	63.9
Holstebro	24.2	6.8	3.8	8.8	5.3	6.8	11.1	29.7	3.5	0.1	43.3	56.6
Ringkøbing-Skjern	17.5	5.7	3.3	7.1	4.3	5.1	13.3	41.3	2.3	0.0	32.5	67.4
Aarhus	26.3	14.1	4.1	10.5	5.2	0.6	7.7	22.6	8.8	0.1	59.7	40.3
Municipality	26.5	8.7	3.7	8.4	4.0	0.4	12.5	30.6	5.2	0.0	48.8	51.1
Municipality	31.8	6.0	2.7	7.1	3.9	0.6	13.8	29.4	4.6	0.0	49.5	50.4
Randers	34.2	6.1	2.9	7.3	3.7	0.7	12.0	28.7	4.3	0.0	52.0	48.0
Favrskov	26.6	8.6	4.3	7.2	4.3	0.5	11.7	32.8	3.8	0.0	46.3	53.7
Odder	27.4	9.2	4.1	9.8	3.9	0.5	9.7	30.0	5.4	0.0	51.8	48.2
Samsø	23.0	7.6	5.3	14.0	3.0	0.2	10.0	27.9	9.0	0.0	53.6	46.4
Skanderborg	25.5	10.2	4.0	8.4	5.1	0.4	10.1	31.5	4.9	0.0	48.9	51.0
Horsens	26.2	8.2	3.4	8.7	6.3	0.5	13.2	28.6	4.8	0.0	47.9	52.0
Hedensted	21.1	6.2	3.3	6.2	5.4	1.6	15.7	37.4	2.9	0.0	36.5	63.5
Sønderborg	27.4	5.9	5.1	7.1	4.4	0.5	15.4	31.1	3.1	0.0	43.5	56.5
Aabenraa	24.9	5.7	3.4	6.0	4.2	1.0	15.6	36.0	3.1	0.0	39.7	60.3
Tønder	24.3	5.4	3.6	6.9	4.7	1.8	13.8	36.5	2.9	0.0	39.5	60.5
Esbjerg	26.9	6.3	3.0	8.8	4.3	0.7	13.1	31.7	5.2	0.0	47.2	52.8
Fanø	20.8	8.5	4.2	10.6	4.9	0.4	13.1	29.8	7.7	0.1	47.6	52.3
Varde	18.8	6.1	3.0	5.9	4.5	1.7	14.2	42.9	2.8	0.0	33.6	66.4
Vejen	22.9	5.9	3.9	6.6	5.4	0.8	14.2	37.7	2.7	0.1	38.0	62.0
Billund	20.2	5.1	3.2	5.0	4.5	1.9	17.1	40.6	2.3	0.0	32.6	67.3
Vejle	22.2	8.6	4.4	7.9	5.6	1.1	16.8	29.4	4.1	0.0	42.8	57.2
Fredericia	30.4	6.2	3.9	7.9	4.4	0.9	15.2	26.7	4.5	0.0	49.0	51.0
Kolding	21.0	7.8	5.3	9.7	5.8	1.0	14.2	31.0	4.2	0.0	42.6	57.3
Haderslev	24.2	6.2	3.7	8.4	5.1	1.3	13.8	33.4	3.9	0.0	42.6	57.4
Odense	29.1	9.9	5.9	11.2	4.5	0.4	10.9	21.0	7.2	0.0	57.3	42.7
Assens	28.9	7.1	4.8	9.3	4.2	0.5	13.4	26.5	5.2	0.0	50.6	49.4
Middelfart	26.7	8.4	4.6	8.7	4.8	0.4	13.2	28.8	4.4	0.0	48.1	51.9
Nordfyn	27.1	5.4	4.6	10.2	4.0	0.3	15.1	29.4	3.9	0.0	46.5	53.4
Nyborg	30.7	6.7	3.8	10.0	3.8	0.3	13.7	25.4	5.3	0.2	52.8	47.0
Kerteminde	31.5	6.7	4.7	10.8	4.0	0.4	13.4	23.6	4.8	0.1	53.8	46.1
Svendborg	26.9	8.9	4.7	11.6	3.8	0.5	11.8	23.2	8.6	0.1	55.9	44.0
Langeland	28.3	6.6	4.0	10.1	3.0	0.5	15.3	24.6	7.6	0.1	52.6	47.3
Faaborg-Midtfyn	26.9	8.3	4.2	9.5	3.8	0.4	12.8	28.8	5.2	0.1	49.9	50.1
Ærø	24.1	6.2	8.8	8.0	2.6	0.6	14.6	28.3	6.7	0.0	45.1	54.9
Lolland	31.2	4.2	3.2	18.3	2.7	0.3	15.3	19.5	5.3	0.1	58.9	41.0
Guldborgsund	31.7	5.6	3.9	10.3	3.1	0.5	16.0	23.3	5.6	0.0	53.2	46.7
Vordingborg	27.2	6.8	4.3	10.7	4.0	0.4	15.8	23.8	7.0	0.0	51.7	48.3
Næstved	28.8	6.7	5.3	8.9	4.3	0.5	15.3	24.8	5.2	0.0	49.7	50.2
Faxe	23.3	7.2	5.2	8.8	4.3	0.3	17.5	28.2	5.2	0.0	44.5	55.5
Stevns	21.4	7.4	5.3	8.3	4.7	0.3	18.5	29.0	5.2	0.0	42.3	57.7
Køge	22.8	8.1	5.4	8.8	5.2	0.3	16.8	27.2	5.4	0.0	45.1	54.9
Lejre	19.1	9.9	4.9	10.1	6.1	0.4	13.9	30.1	5.5	0.0	44.7	55.3
Greve	20.0	7.7	5.7	6.4	5.5	0.3	17.2	33.4	3.7	0.0	37.8	62.2
Solrød	18.6	7.7	6.2	6.3	6.6	0.2	15.1	35.4	3.9	0.0	36.5	63.4
Roskilde	21.4	11.8	5.6	10.4	5.9	0.4	12.1	25.6	6.8	0.0	50.4	49.6
Holbæk	25.9	8.4	4.9	9.2	4.3	0.4	14.5	26.3	6.1	0.0	49.6	50.4
Kalundborg	24.9	6.1	3.2	10.0	3.4	0.4	20.3	26.5	5.2	0.1	46.1	53.8
Odsherred	25.2	6.9	3.5	9.3	3.2	0.3	18.2	26.5	7.0	0.0	48.3	51.7
Ringsted	24.8	8.1	4.1	8.5	5.0	0.3	16.4	26.7	6.0	0.1	47.4	52.5
Sorø	23.8	8.2	5.1	9.4	4.7	0.6	15.8	26.8	5.4	0.1	46.9	53.0
Slagelse	25.7	6.1	4.1	9.7	4.6	0.3	18.3	25.6	5.4	0.2	46.9	52.9
Helsingør	23.6	11.0	6.3	8.6	6.1	0.2	11.8	25.9	6.4	0.0	49.6	50.3
Fredensborg	17.4	12.6	8.0	7.8	7.5	0.3	9.9	31.6	4.8	0.0	42.5	57.4
Hørsholm	10.4	11.3	13.8	3.1	11.2	0.2	7.6	40.1	2.3	0.0	27.1	72.9
Hillerød	20.3	12.3	6.0	7.9	6.2	0.9	9.6	30.6	6.2	0.0	46.7	53.3
Gribskov	17.7	8.8	4.0	7.0	5.3	0.9	13.3	37.6	5.3	0.0	38.8	61.2
Frederikssund	22.4	8.6	4.1	8.3	5.4	0.4	13.7	31.8	5.3	0.0	44.6	55.4
Halsnæs	25.5	7.2	3.4	9.9	4.5	0.4	14.9	27.1	7.0	0.0	49.6	50.3
Egedal	20.9	10.9	5.9	6.5	6.9	0.3	12.1	32.6	4.0	0.0	42.2	57.7
Furesø	18.4	15.6	7.9	7.8	7.8	0.2	7.7	28.2	6.6	0.0	48.3	51.7
Rudersdal	11.6	15.5	9.9	5.3	10.9	0.2	6.3	36.1	4.3	0.1	36.7	63.2
Allerød	15.4	14.0	8.7	7.4	8.1	0.4	8.5	33.4	4.0	0.0	40.8	59.1
Gentofte	11.9	15.1	15.0	4.8	10.2	0.3	6.9	30.8	5.1	0.0	36.8	63.2
Lyngby-Taarbæk	18.0	15.9	9.6	8.0	7.6	0.3	8.3	26.4	5.9	0.0	47.8	52.1
Gladsaxe	26.0	12.7	5.4	9.7	4.7	0.4	11.6	20.3	9.2	0.1	57.5	42.4
Rødovre	31.6	8.9	4.4	9.8	3.6	0.4	14.6	18.3	8.1	0.1	58.5	41.4
Herlev	31.0	8.6	5.2	9.8	3.9	0.8	13.8	18.6	8.2	0.1	57.6	42.3
Hvidovre	28.7	8.5	4.2	10.4	3.9	0.3	16.5	18.9	8.6	0.1	56.0	43.9
Brøndby	32.7	7.4	3.4	10.5	3.3	0.3	16.9	17.4	7.9	0.1	58.5	41.4
Ishøj	31.9	7.3	3.4	10.5	3.5	0.2	16.0	19.6	7.4	0.1	57.1	42.8
Vallensbæk	22.3	9.1	10.8	6.9	5.0	0.2	14.3	27.8	3.6	0.0	41.9	58.0
Høje-Taastrup	27.6	9.0	6.4	8.0	4.1	0.3	14.9	23.8	5.7	0.1	50.3	49.6
Albertslund	30.9	9.2	3.5	13.8	2.9	0.3	12.7	13.5	13.3	0.1	67.1	32.8
Ballerup	33.1	8.5	4.6	8.4	4.3	0.4	14.3	19.4	7.0	0.1	57.0	42.9
Glostrup	28.9	7.7	4.7	8.2	4.2	0.3	16.8	22.9	6.3	0.1	51.1	48.8
Copenhagen	19.0	17.2	4.6	13.2	5.7	0.3	7.7	13.7	18.5	0.1	67.9	32.0
Frederiksberg	16.6	18.8	9.7	10.5	7.0	0.3	7.0	17.9	12.2	0.0	58.1	41.8
Tårnby	25.0	7.8	4.2	9.8	3.9	0.3	18.6	22.3	7.9	0.1	50.5	49.4
Dragør	15.5	10.2	9.8	6.3	7.2	0.1	14.0	31.9	4.9	0.0	36.9	63.1
Bornholm	35.9	5.5	2.1	7.3	1.9	2.5	10.9	26.7	7.2	0.0	55.9	44.1
