= Results of the 2009 European Parliament election in Denmark =

This is a list of the results in the 2009 European Parliament election in Denmark. The results are as found on the official website dedicated to the results made by Statistics Denmark.

== Denmark ==
Division	A	B	C	F	I	J	N	O	V
Division	%	%	%	%	%	%	%	%	%
Denmark	21.5	4.3	12.7	15.9	0.6	2.4	7.2	15.3	20.2

== Vote share by electoral division ==
Division	A	B	C	F	I	J	N	O	V
Division	%	%	%	%	%	%	%	%	%
Mid & Northern Jutland	22.4	3.5	12.9	14.5	0.6	2.4	6.0	14.6	23.2
Zealand & Southern Denmark	22.1	3.2	13.4	14.4	0.5	2.2	6.2	16.9	21.1
Capital	19.8	6.3	11.6	19.1	0.8	2.6	9.7	14.1	16.0

== Vote share by constituency ==
Division	A	B	C	F	I	J	N	O	V
Division	%	%	%	%	%	%	%	%	%
North Jutland	23.1	3.1	13.4	14.1	0.5	3.2	6.2	14.1	22.5
West Jutland	18.8	3.3	15.1	12.1	0.5	1.6	5.3	14.6	28.6
East Jutland	24.2	4.0	11.0	16.4	0.7	2.4	6.3	14.9	20.2
South Jutland	20.0	3.0	13.0	12.5	0.5	1.9	5.5	17.4	26.3
Funen	26.6	3.2	17.2	15.0	0.5	2.5	6.0	13.5	15.6
Zealand	21.1	3.4	11.5	15.5	0.5	2.2	6.8	18.6	20.3
North Zealand	17.5	5.4	14.9	15.0	0.8	2.2	7.1	15.0	22.2
Greater Copenhagen	21.4	5.0	12.1	16.2	0.7	2.4	9.5	17.0	15.7
Copenhagen	19.9	8.3	9.0	24.8	0.8	3.0	11.9	11.1	11.2
Bornholm	26.4	2.8	9.6	13.7	0.4	3.0	8.3	14.0	21.8

== Vote share by nomination district ==
Division	A	B	C	F	I	J	N	O	V
Division	%	%	%	%	%	%	%	%	%
Frederikshavn	23.7	2.3	12.6	12.5	0.4	3.4	6.2	17.2	21.7
Hjørring	22.0	2.8	14.6	13.3	0.4	3.1	6.0	13.7	24.1
Brønderslev	26.3	2.5	12.7	11.4	0.4	2.6	6.5	13.4	24.2
Thisted	20.9	2.5	15.5	12.5	0.3	2.2	5.7	14.7	25.6
Himmerland	18.5	2.9	14.6	12.5	0.4	3.9	4.6	14.1	28.4
Mariagerfjord	22.0	2.7	14.5	13.2	0.5	2.7	5.4	14.9	24.0
Aalborg East	25.8	4.1	10.8	18.1	0.6	3.7	7.5	13.5	15.8
Aalborg West	22.6	4.0	13.9	16.7	0.6	3.5	6.4	12.3	20.1
Aalborg North	25.1	3.7	11.5	15.7	0.6	3.3	7.4	13.8	18.9
Struer	18.2	3.1	17.2	13.6	0.4	2.0	5.0	14.2	26.4
Skive	20.3	5.0	10.5	12.2	0.3	1.3	8.5	14.6	27.4
Viborg West	21.5	3.3	10.6	13.7	0.4	1.6	6.3	12.6	29.9
Viborg East	19.7	3.4	11.9	11.3	0.4	1.7	4.6	13.3	33.7
Silkeborg North	19.7	3.2	13.3	13.7	0.7	1.8	5.3	15.8	26.5
Silkeborg South	22.2	3.9	12.3	16.8	0.7	1.9	6.7	14.4	21.0
Ikast	17.6	2.3	20.8	8.6	0.4	1.2	4.1	18.0	27.0
Herning South	19.7	3.1	16.7	10.3	0.6	1.5	4.7	15.3	28.3
Herning North	15.7	2.9	19.6	9.0	0.5	1.4	4.0	14.7	32.2
Holstebro	19.1	4.2	14.7	13.3	0.5	1.7	5.4	14.3	26.7
Ringkøbing	14.3	2.4	19.2	10.0	0.4	1.6	3.8	13.9	34.5
Aarhus South	24.9	5.2	10.4	19.2	0.8	2.5	6.8	11.7	18.5
Aarhus West	28.1	3.6	9.0	18.0	0.6	2.6	6.9	15.0	16.3
Aarhus North	27.7	5.7	8.9	22.2	0.8	2.9	7.9	10.4	13.4
Aarhus East	23.4	6.4	10.1	22.7	1.0	2.7	7.4	9.4	16.9
Djurs	23.2	2.5	10.3	13.3	0.4	2.1	5.8	18.5	23.9
Randers North	28.7	2.6	10.4	11.2	0.4	2.1	5.3	19.7	19.6
Randers South	26.1	2.6	11.4	11.7	0.6	1.8	5.5	19.5	20.7
Favrskov	23.0	3.1	12.3	13.6	0.5	2.0	4.7	16.0	24.8
Skanderborg	22.6	3.9	11.6	15.8	0.7	2.5	5.8	13.9	23.3
Horsens	21.6	3.1	13.6	13.6	0.6	2.2	6.3	17.7	21.3
Hedensted	16.8	2.4	15.1	10.5	0.5	1.9	4.4	19.7	28.7
Sønderborg	22.9	3.0	11.9	10.5	0.5	2.0	5.3	20.6	23.3
Aabenraa	19.7	3.4	13.5	9.5	0.4	1.9	5.2	18.9	27.4
Tønder	17.2	2.8	14.3	10.6	0.3	2.2	5.2	16.0	31.4
City of Esbjerg	26.5	2.9	8.5	15.2	0.4	1.8	9.3	16.4	19.0
Greater Esbjerg	20.7	2.8	11.3	13.3	0.4	1.9	5.8	15.3	28.5
Varde	15.8	2.8	13.7	9.2	0.4	1.7	4.0	15.9	36.6
Vejen	18.3	2.7	14.7	10.3	0.4	1.8	4.2	16.4	31.1
Vejle North	16.9	3.3	14.0	13.8	0.6	1.8	4.9	16.7	27.9
Vejle South	20.0	3.4	12.9	14.6	0.5	2.1	5.9	17.6	23.1
Fredericia	21.8	2.5	13.0	14.0	0.6	2.0	6.6	18.9	20.6
Kolding North	17.7	3.6	14.6	15.1	0.6	1.8	5.0	15.7	25.9
Kolding South	19.1	3.0	14.9	15.3	0.5	1.8	5.3	17.0	23.1
Haderslev	20.1	2.8	12.9	13.2	0.4	1.8	4.9	18.4	25.5
Odense East	31.4	3.8	14.2	19.0	0.7	2.6	7.4	11.9	9.0
Odense West	29.2	2.9	19.4	15.3	0.4	2.7	6.4	13.5	10.3
Odense South	25.5	4.1	19.8	16.2	0.6	2.5	5.3	12.2	13.9
Assens	27.2	2.6	18.2	12.9	0.4	2.3	4.7	13.3	18.3
Middelfart	27.5	2.7	18.0	11.2	0.4	1.9	4.8	14.0	19.4
Nyborg	27.2	2.4	16.4	13.7	0.3	2.3	5.8	15.1	16.7
Svendborg	23.2	3.5	13.9	17.0	0.4	3.0	7.6	13.8	17.5
Faaborg	23.1	3.0	18.1	14.3	0.5	2.4	5.7	14.1	18.8
Lolland	25.3	2.2	9.7	18.1	0.3	2.1	6.9	18.4	17.1
Guldborgsund	26.3	2.7	10.4	14.6	0.3	2.0	6.0	18.6	18.9
Vordingborg	20.4	3.5	10.9	17.9	0.5	2.2	7.8	17.6	19.3
Næstved	24.0	3.0	11.9	14.9	0.5	2.0	6.5	18.0	19.3
Faxe	19.2	3.1	11.9	14.3	0.5	2.5	7.4	19.8	21.3
Køge	20.0	3.7	12.0	15.7	0.6	2.0	6.9	18.5	20.6
Greve	18.4	3.4	12.4	10.8	0.6	2.0	5.9	22.0	24.4
Roskilde	20.5	5.0	12.3	18.1	0.6	2.4	8.0	14.6	18.5
Holbæk	20.1	4.6	11.5	17.0	0.4	2.3	7.3	16.6	20.2
Kalundborg	19.8	3.1	9.6	15.4	0.4	2.4	6.9	20.6	21.8
Ringsted	20.1	3.3	12.5	16.1	0.6	2.2	6.4	17.7	21.0
Slagelse	21.1	2.7	11.6	14.4	0.5	2.3	6.1	21.5	19.8
Helsingør	19.7	5.2	14.1	17.3	0.7	2.4	8.6	15.6	16.3
Fredensborg	14.4	5.8	19.8	12.0	0.9	1.9	5.2	14.1	25.8
Hillerød	18.1	4.5	13.3	16.0	0.6	2.3	8.1	15.3	21.8
Frederikssund	21.4	3.2	11.1	15.4	0.5	2.2	8.1	20.1	17.9
Egedal	17.8	6.1	13.9	16.0	0.8	2.2	7.0	14.7	21.5
Rudersdal	14.2	7.4	17.4	13.1	0.9	2.0	5.6	11.3	28.1
Gentofte	13.2	8.1	20.6	13.0	1.1	1.9	5.5	10.9	25.7
Lyngby	17.1	8.0	15.7	16.8	1.0	2.4	6.8	11.9	20.3
Gladsaxe	21.1	5.9	10.1	18.0	0.7	2.1	14.0	14.7	13.3
Rødovre	25.5	3.5	9.6	17.7	0.5	2.3	10.7	18.5	11.8
Hvidovre	24.1	3.4	7.4	17.0	0.5	2.5	11.4	21.7	12.0
Brøndby	25.0	3.1	10.8	14.4	0.5	2.0	9.3	22.1	12.8
Taastrup	23.0	3.5	10.4	16.8	0.5	3.2	10.0	19.1	13.5
Ballerup	24.7	3.5	9.7	16.5	0.5	2.6	9.5	19.6	13.5
Easterbro	19.0	9.9	9.4	25.7	1.1	2.8	10.7	8.7	12.6
Sundvester	20.5	8.4	8.1	23.9	0.9	3.0	12.1	12.0	11.1
Indre By	17.7	11.1	9.5	26.0	1.0	2.9	11.5	6.4	13.8
Sundbyøster	20.7	7.5	7.3	25.0	0.8	3.3	12.2	12.5	10.7
Nørrebro	19.8	9.4	5.5	33.2	0.7	3.4	14.8	6.5	6.9
Bispebjerg	20.9	6.6	7.5	26.1	0.9	2.8	14.4	12.4	8.6
Brønshøj	21.1	6.7	7.6	23.2	0.7	3.7	13.0	13.8	10.2
Valby	21.3	6.8	8.0	24.7	0.7	2.9	13.0	12.8	9.8
Vesterbro	19.8	10.2	6.0	30.1	0.9	3.7	14.0	7.8	7.6
Falkoner	18.7	9.8	14.0	22.1	1.0	2.7	9.3	9.0	13.5
Slots	19.5	8.2	14.7	20.8	1.0	2.4	9.0	11.1	13.3
Tårnby	20.5	4.0	10.4	15.5	0.5	2.2	9.2	21.9	15.8
Rønne	30.8	2.7	9.6	12.9	0.5	2.3	7.9	14.0	19.5
Aakirkeby	22.5	2.8	9.7	14.5	0.3	3.6	8.7	14.1	23.9

== Vote share by region ==
Division	A	B	C	F	I	J	N	O	V
Division	%	%	%	%	%	%	%	%	%
North Denmark	23.1	3.1	13.4	14.1	0.5	3.2	6.2	14.1	22.5
Central Denmark	22.1	3.7	12.7	14.7	0.6	2.1	5.9	14.8	23.6
Southern Denmark	22.8	3.1	14.8	13.6	0.5	2.1	5.7	15.7	21.7
Zealand	21.1	3.4	11.5	15.5	0.5	2.2	6.8	18.6	20.3
Capital	19.8	6.3	11.6	19.1	0.8	2.6	9.7	14.1	16.0

== Vote share by municipality ==
Division	A	B	C	F	I	J	N	O	V
Division	%	%	%	%	%	%	%	%	%
Frederikshavn	23.8	2.3	12.7	12.5	0.4	3.4	6.1	17.2	21.5
Læsø	19.3	2.1	9.5	11.6	0.5	3.0	9.0	19.5	25.5
Hjørring	22.0	2.8	14.6	13.3	0.4	3.1	6.0	13.7	24.1
Brønderslev	23.3	2.8	13.3	12.6	0.4	2.8	6.4	13.2	25.3
Jammerbugt	29.0	2.3	12.1	10.4	0.4	2.4	6.6	13.6	23.1
Thisted	20.6	2.5	16.3	13.0	0.3	2.4	5.3	14.3	25.2
Morsø	21.4	2.6	13.8	11.7	0.2	1.9	6.5	15.5	26.4
Vesthimmerland	17.3	2.5	15.7	10.5	0.3	4.5	4.3	14.7	30.2
Rebild	20.0	3.5	13.4	14.9	0.5	3.2	5.0	13.4	26.1
Mariagerfjord	22.0	2.7	14.5	13.2	0.5	2.7	5.4	14.9	24.0
Aalborg	24.5	3.9	12.0	16.9	0.6	3.5	7.1	13.2	18.1
Lemvig	15.6	3.1	17.6	13.4	0.4	1.9	4.3	14.9	28.8
Struer	20.6	3.0	16.9	13.9	0.4	2.0	5.5	13.6	24.1
Skive	20.3	5.0	10.5	12.2	0.3	1.3	8.5	14.6	27.4
Viborg	20.6	3.3	11.2	12.5	0.4	1.7	5.5	12.9	31.8
Silkeborg	21.0	3.6	12.8	15.3	0.7	1.9	6.0	15.1	23.7
Ikast-Brande	17.6	2.3	20.8	8.6	0.4	1.2	4.1	18.0	27.0
Herning	17.6	3.0	18.2	9.6	0.5	1.4	4.3	15.0	30.4
Holstebro	19.1	4.2	14.7	13.3	0.5	1.7	5.4	14.3	26.7
Ringkøbing-Skjern	14.3	2.4	19.2	10.0	0.4	1.6	3.8	13.9	34.5
Aarhus	25.9	5.3	9.6	20.6	0.8	2.7	7.3	11.5	16.3
Municipality	21.8	3.0	10.6	14.7	0.4	2.1	6.1	16.9	24.3
Municipality	24.9	2.0	9.9	11.7	0.3	2.0	5.4	20.4	23.5
Randers	27.3	2.6	10.9	11.5	0.5	1.9	5.4	19.6	20.2
Favrskov	23.0	3.1	12.3	13.6	0.5	2.0	4.7	16.0	24.8
Odder	23.8	4.2	12.4	16.3	0.5	2.4	6.1	12.7	21.7
Samsø	16.6	3.1	12.8	21.0	0.7	3.3	9.4	11.4	21.9
Skanderborg	22.5	3.8	11.3	15.2	0.7	2.5	5.4	14.6	24.0
Horsens	21.6	3.1	13.6	13.6	0.6	2.2	6.3	17.7	21.3
Hedensted	16.8	2.4	15.1	10.5	0.5	1.9	4.4	19.7	28.7
Sønderborg	22.9	3.0	11.9	10.5	0.5	2.0	5.3	20.6	23.3
Aabenraa	19.7	3.4	13.5	9.5	0.4	1.9	5.2	18.9	27.4
Tønder	17.2	2.8	14.3	10.6	0.3	2.2	5.2	16.0	31.4
Esbjerg	24.0	2.8	9.9	14.1	0.4	1.8	7.5	15.9	23.7
Fanø	17.1	4.8	8.2	21.3	0.2	3.3	10.9	14.5	19.7
Varde	15.8	2.8	13.7	9.2	0.4	1.7	4.0	15.9	36.6
Vejen	17.6	2.8	14.0	11.2	0.5	2.0	4.2	16.5	31.4
Billund	19.4	2.7	16.0	8.7	0.4	1.5	4.2	16.4	30.6
Vejle	18.5	3.4	13.4	14.2	0.5	2.0	5.4	17.2	25.5
Fredericia	21.8	2.5	13.0	14.0	0.6	2.0	6.6	18.9	20.6
Kolding	18.4	3.3	14.7	15.2	0.5	1.8	5.2	16.4	24.4
Haderslev	20.1	2.8	12.9	13.2	0.4	1.8	4.9	18.4	25.5
Odense	28.5	3.7	17.9	16.8	0.6	2.6	6.3	12.5	11.2
Assens	27.2	2.6	18.2	12.9	0.4	2.3	4.7	13.3	18.3
Middelfart	25.1	3.4	16.6	12.9	0.5	2.1	4.9	13.8	20.6
Nordfyn	30.5	1.8	19.8	9.0	0.3	1.7	4.5	14.3	17.9
Nyborg	27.6	2.5	15.7	13.2	0.3	2.2	5.6	15.0	17.8
Kerteminde	26.8	2.4	17.2	14.4	0.4	2.4	6.0	15.2	15.4
Svendborg	23.8	3.6	13.7	17.6	0.4	3.1	7.6	13.2	17.0
Langeland	20.9	2.6	14.9	14.1	0.4	2.7	8.0	16.6	19.9
Faaborg-Midtfyn	23.6	3.1	17.4	14.6	0.4	2.4	5.5	14.1	18.8
Ærø	19.5	2.1	23.7	11.8	0.6	2.6	7.3	14.1	18.3
Lolland	25.3	2.2	9.7	18.1	0.3	2.1	6.9	18.4	17.1
Guldborgsund	26.3	2.7	10.4	14.6	0.3	2.0	6.0	18.6	18.9
Vordingborg	20.4	3.5	10.9	17.9	0.5	2.2	7.8	17.6	19.3
Næstved	24.0	3.0	11.9	14.9	0.5	2.0	6.5	18.0	19.3
Faxe	19.7	3.0	11.9	14.0	0.5	2.5	7.7	19.9	20.8
Stevns	18.3	3.2	12.0	14.7	0.6	2.6	6.9	19.6	22.1
Køge	21.2	3.2	12.2	15.0	0.5	1.8	6.7	19.7	19.6
Lejre	17.7	4.5	11.6	17.2	0.7	2.5	7.3	16.0	22.4
Greve	18.5	3.4	12.3	10.8	0.6	1.9	5.9	22.9	23.7
Solrød	18.2	3.5	12.5	10.9	0.6	2.1	6.1	20.0	26.0
Roskilde	20.5	5.0	12.3	18.1	0.6	2.4	8.0	14.6	18.5
Holbæk	20.1	4.6	11.5	17.0	0.4	2.3	7.3	16.6	20.2
Kalundborg	20.0	2.7	8.9	14.8	0.4	2.1	6.4	21.2	23.6
Odsherred	19.5	3.7	10.7	16.2	0.4	2.8	7.7	19.8	19.2
Ringsted	21.1	3.3	12.1	14.9	0.6	2.2	6.3	18.2	21.3
Sorø	19.2	3.3	13.0	17.4	0.6	2.3	6.5	17.3	20.6
Slagelse	21.1	2.7	11.6	14.4	0.5	2.3	6.1	21.5	19.8
Helsingør	19.7	5.2	14.1	17.3	0.7	2.4	8.6	15.6	16.3
Fredensborg	16.7	5.9	16.1	14.8	0.8	2.2	6.3	14.8	22.4
Hørsholm	11.1	5.7	25.2	8.0	1.0	1.6	3.5	13.2	30.7
Hillerød	19.6	4.9	14.0	17.0	0.6	2.4	8.1	12.9	20.5
Gribskov	16.3	3.9	12.4	14.9	0.7	2.2	8.2	18.1	23.3
Frederikssund	19.1	3.4	11.3	15.4	0.6	2.0	8.0	20.4	19.7
Halsnæs	25.0	3.0	10.7	15.4	0.4	2.5	8.3	19.6	15.1
Egedal	18.3	4.8	13.8	14.2	0.8	2.2	6.6	17.4	21.8
Furesø	17.2	7.4	13.9	17.9	0.8	2.3	7.4	11.9	21.2
Rudersdal	13.5	8.0	17.3	12.7	1.0	2.0	5.2	10.8	29.7
Allerød	15.5	5.9	17.7	14.1	0.9	2.1	6.6	12.6	24.7
Gentofte	13.2	8.1	20.6	13.0	1.1	1.9	5.5	10.9	25.7
Lyngby-Taarbæk	17.1	8.0	15.7	16.8	1.0	2.4	6.8	11.9	20.3
Gladsaxe	21.1	5.9	10.1	18.0	0.7	2.1	14.0	14.7	13.3
Rødovre	25.8	3.7	8.8	17.6	0.5	2.3	10.9	19.0	11.4
Herlev	25.1	3.3	10.8	17.7	0.5	2.3	10.3	17.8	12.3
Hvidovre	24.1	3.4	7.4	17.0	0.5	2.5	11.4	21.7	12.0
Brøndby	25.9	2.8	8.4	16.6	0.4	2.1	10.7	21.7	11.4
Ishøj	26.9	3.2	8.5	13.3	0.6	2.1	9.1	24.7	11.7
Vallensbæk	20.9	3.7	18.7	10.8	0.6	1.7	6.6	20.0	17.1
Høje-Taastrup	22.7	3.5	12.4	13.9	0.5	2.6	7.5	20.8	16.2
Albertslund	23.7	3.7	6.8	22.1	0.4	4.3	14.5	16.0	8.4
Ballerup	25.5	3.6	9.4	17.0	0.5	2.7	9.9	18.2	13.3
Glostrup	22.7	3.1	10.4	15.2	0.5	2.4	8.5	23.0	14.1
Copenhagen	20.0	8.6	7.7	26.5	0.9	3.2	12.8	10.1	10.2
Frederiksberg	19.1	9.0	14.3	21.5	1.0	2.5	9.2	10.0	13.4
Tårnby	22.5	3.4	8.5	16.1	0.4	2.3	10.4	23.1	13.3
Dragør	15.6	5.4	15.3	14.1	0.7	2.0	6.1	18.8	22.0
Bornholm	26.4	2.8	9.6	13.7	0.4	2.9	8.3	14.1	21.8
