= Vordingborg (nomination district) =

Electoral district in Denmark

- Vordingborg
- Nomination district constituency for the Folketing
- Location of Vordingborg within Zealand

- Location of Zealand within Denmark
- Municipalities: Vordingborg
- Constituency: Zealand
- Electorate: 35,188 (2022)

Current constituency
- Created: 1849 (as constituency); 1920 (as nomination district)

Vordingborg nominating district is one of the 92 nominating districts that exists for Danish elections following the 2007 municipal reform. It consists of Vordingborg Municipality. It was created in 1849 as a constituency, and has been a nomination district since 1920, though its boundaries have been changed since then. From 1915 to 1970, it was known as Stege-Vordingborg.

In general elections, the district has tended to vote a bit more for parties commonly associated with the red bloc.

== General elections results ==
=== General elections in the 2020s ===
2022 Danish general election

Parties	Vote		
Parties	Votes	%	+ / -
Social Democrats	9,608	33.46	+3.25
Moderates	3,328	11.59	New
Green Left	2,934	10.22	+0.65
Venstre	2,733	9.52	-12.77
Denmark Democrats	2,119	7.38	New
Liberal Alliance	1,584	5.52	+4.27
New Right	1,236	4.30	+2.08
Danish People's Party	1,227	4.27	-5.43
Red–Green Alliance	1,223	4.26	-2.60
Conservatives	1,054	3.67	-1.25
The Alternative	872	3.04	+0.23
Social Liberals	566	1.97	-3.98
Independent Greens	81	0.28	New
Christian Democrats	63	0.22	-0.44
Lisa Sofia Larsson	51	0.18	New
Rasmus Paludan	33	0.11	New
Total	28,712		

=== General elections in the 2010s ===
2019 Danish general election

Parties	Vote		
Parties	Votes	%	+ / -
Social Democrats	7,243	30.21	+0.38
Venstre	5,344	22.29	+3.54
Danish People's Party	2,326	9.70	-15.31
Green Left	2,295	9.57	+5.91
Red–Green Alliance	1,644	6.86	-0.94
Social Liberals	1,426	5.95	+3.51
Conservatives	1,180	4.92	+2.49
The Alternative	673	2.81	-2.10
Stram Kurs	619	2.58	New
New Right	532	2.22	New
Liberal Alliance	300	1.25	-3.58
Klaus Riskær Pedersen Party	221	0.92	New
Christian Democrats	159	0.66	+0.36
Pinki Karin Yvonne Jensen	15	0.06	New
Total	23,977		

2015 Danish general election

Parties	Vote		
Parties	Votes	%	+ / -
Social Democrats	8,975	29.83	+2.64
Danish People's Party	7,526	25.01	+9.25
Venstre	5,642	18.75	-5.07
Red–Green Alliance	2,346	7.80	+0.76
The Alternative	1,477	4.91	New
Liberal Alliance	1,454	4.83	+0.83
Green Left	1,101	3.66	-6.99
Social Liberals	734	2.44	-4.33
Conservatives	732	2.43	-1.91
Christian Democrats	89	0.30	-0.07
Aamer Ahmad	9	0.03	New
Michael Christiansen	4	0.01	New
Bent A. Jespersen	2	0.01	0.00
Total	30,091		

2011 Danish general election

Parties	Vote		
Parties	Votes	%	+ / -
Social Democrats	8,362	27.19	+1.28
Venstre	7,326	23.82	-2.85
Danish People's Party	4,847	15.76	-0.60
Green Left	3,276	10.65	-3.98
Red–Green Alliance	2,164	7.04	+4.96
Social Liberals	2,083	6.77	+2.79
Conservatives	1,336	4.34	-3.35
Liberal Alliance	1,230	4.00	+1.64
Christian Democrats	113	0.37	+0.03
Johan Isbrandt Haulik	9	0.03	New
Peter Lotinga	3	0.01	New
Bent A. Jespersen	2	0.01	New
Total	30,751		

=== General elections in the 2000s ===
2007 Danish general election

Parties	Vote		
Parties	Votes	%	+ / -
Venstre	8,229	26.67	-1.05
Social Democrats	7,995	25.91	-0.98
Danish People's Party	5,049	16.36	+1.61
Green Left	4,514	14.63	+7.12
Conservatives	2,372	7.69	-1.98
Social Liberals	1,228	3.98	-3.60
New Alliance	727	2.36	New
Red–Green Alliance	642	2.08	-1.44
Christian Democrats	104	0.34	-0.50
Total	30,860		

2005 Danish general election

Parties	Vote		
Parties	Votes	%	+ / -
Venstre	6,919	27.72	-1.98
Social Democrats	6,711	26.89	-4.63
Danish People's Party	3,681	14.75	+3.02
Conservatives	2,414	9.67	+0.01
Social Liberals	1,893	7.58	+3.94
Green Left	1,875	7.51	-0.46
Red–Green Alliance	878	3.52	+1.11
Centre Democrats	277	1.11	-0.33
Christian Democrats	210	0.84	-0.45
Minority Party	100	0.40	New
Jens Paul Wojczak Pihl	3	0.01	New
Total	24,961		

2001 Danish general election

Parties	Vote		
Parties	Votes	%	+ / -
Social Democrats	8,080	31.52	-7.74
Venstre	7,613	29.70	+8.71
Danish People's Party	3,006	11.73	+4.60
Conservatives	2,477	9.66	0.00
Green Left	2,044	7.97	-0.25
Social Liberals	933	3.64	-0.04
Red–Green Alliance	617	2.41	-0.18
Centre Democrats	368	1.44	-2.92
Christian People's Party	330	1.29	-0.61
Progress Party	167	0.65	-1.27
Total	25,635		

=== General elections in the 1990s ===
1998 Danish general election

Parties	Vote		
Parties	Votes	%	+ / -
Social Democrats	9,896	39.26	-0.81
Venstre	5,291	20.99	+0.20
Conservatives	2,436	9.66	-4.99
Green Left	2,072	8.22	+1.72
Danish People's Party	1,796	7.13	New
Centre Democrats	1,098	4.36	+1.53
Social Liberals	927	3.68	-1.38
Red–Green Alliance	653	2.59	-1.05
Progress Party	484	1.92	-3.91
Christian People's Party	478	1.90	+1.27
Democratic Renewal	66	0.26	New
Bjarne S. Landsfeldt	8	0.03	New
Total	25,205		

1994 Danish general election

Parties	Vote		
Parties	Votes	%	+ / -
Social Democrats	9,844	40.07	-4.55
Venstre	5,108	20.79	+6.73
Conservatives	3,599	14.65	-0.04
Green Left	1,596	6.50	+0.17
Progress Party	1,433	5.83	-0.45
Social Liberals	1,244	5.06	+1.80
Red–Green Alliance	895	3.64	+2.27
Centre Democrats	696	2.83	-2.54
Christian People's Party	155	0.63	-0.43
Total	24,570		

1990 Danish general election

Parties	Vote		
Parties	Votes	%	+ / -
Social Democrats	10,935	44.62	+8.09
Conservatives	3,600	14.69	-4.31
Venstre	3,445	14.06	+3.26
Green Left	1,550	6.33	-3.67
Progress Party	1,538	6.28	-2.40
Centre Democrats	1,315	5.37	+0.67
Social Liberals	799	3.26	-1.66
Common Course	399	1.63	-0.65
Red–Green Alliance	335	1.37	New
Christian People's Party	260	1.06	+0.36
The Greens	203	0.83	-0.52
Justice Party of Denmark	117	0.48	New
Humanist Party	9	0.04	New
Total	24,505		

=== General elections in the 1980s ===
1988 Danish general election

Parties	Vote		
Parties	Votes	%	+ / -
Social Democrats	9,184	36.53	+0.93
Conservatives	4,776	19.00	-1.61
Venstre	2,716	10.80	+0.05
Green Left	2,513	10.00	-1.42
Progress Party	2,181	8.68	+4.27
Social Liberals	1,236	4.92	-0.84
Centre Democrats	1,182	4.70	+0.23
Common Course	574	2.28	-0.11
The Greens	339	1.35	-0.02
Christian People's Party	177	0.70	-0.32
Communist Party of Denmark	161	0.64	-0.03
Left Socialists	101	0.40	-0.42
Total	25,140		

1987 Danish general election

Parties	Vote		
Parties	Votes	%	+ / -
Social Democrats	8,991	35.60	-0.85
Conservatives	5,204	20.61	-2.92
Green Left	2,885	11.42	+3.02
Venstre	2,715	10.75	-1.98
Social Liberals	1,456	5.76	+0.36
Centre Democrats	1,130	4.47	-0.34
Progress Party	1,115	4.41	+0.70
Common Course	603	2.39	New
The Greens	347	1.37	New
Christian People's Party	257	1.02	-0.35
Left Socialists	208	0.82	-0.93
Communist Party of Denmark	168	0.67	+0.15
Justice Party of Denmark	109	0.43	-0.81
Humanist Party	45	0.18	New
Socialist Workers Party	16	0.06	0.00
Marxist–Leninists Party	7	0.03	+0.01
Total	25,256		

1984 Danish general election

Parties	Vote		
Parties	Votes	%	+ / -
Social Democrats	9,106	36.45	-0.58
Conservatives	5,879	23.53	+9.62
Venstre	3,180	12.73	-0.28
Green Left	2,098	8.40	+0.26
Social Liberals	1,349	5.40	+0.02
Centre Democrats	1,202	4.81	-3.61
Progress Party	927	3.71	-5.67
Left Socialists	437	1.75	+0.29
Christian People's Party	343	1.37	+0.24
Justice Party of Denmark	310	1.24	+0.08
Communist Party of Denmark	130	0.52	-0.26
Socialist Workers Party	15	0.06	-0.02
Marxist–Leninists Party	4	0.02	New
Total	24,980		

1981 Danish general election

Parties	Vote		
Parties	Votes	%	+ / -
Social Democrats	8,854	37.03	-4.43
Conservatives	3,326	13.91	+2.00
Venstre	3,111	13.01	-2.31
Progress Party	2,243	9.38	-1.54
Centre Democrats	2,012	8.42	+5.22
Green Left	1,946	8.14	+4.00
Social Liberals	1,287	5.38	-0.34
Left Socialists	349	1.46	-0.88
Justice Party of Denmark	277	1.16	-0.68
Christian People's Party	269	1.13	-0.02
Communist Party of Denmark	187	0.78	-0.80
Communist Workers Party	28	0.12	-0.29
Socialist Workers Party	20	0.08	New
Total	23,909		

=== General elections in the 1970s ===
1979 Danish general election

Parties	Vote		
Parties	Votes	%	+ / -
Social Democrats	9,979	41.46	+1.96
Venstre	3,687	15.32	+0.02
Conservatives	2,867	11.91	+3.54
Progress Party	2,629	10.92	-2.67
Social Liberals	1,378	5.72	+0.95
Green Left	997	4.14	+1.93
Centre Democrats	770	3.20	-2.87
Left Socialists	564	2.34	+0.62
Justice Party of Denmark	443	1.84	-0.61
Communist Party of Denmark	381	1.58	-1.07
Christian People's Party	276	1.15	-0.94
Communist Workers Party	99	0.41	New
Total	24,070		

1977 Danish general election

Parties	Vote		
Parties	Votes	%	+ / -
Social Democrats	9,285	39.50	+4.83
Venstre	3,596	15.30	-11.29
Progress Party	3,195	13.59	+2.57
Conservatives	1,968	8.37	+3.04
Centre Democrats	1,427	6.07	+4.11
Social Liberals	1,122	4.77	-3.74
Communist Party of Denmark	624	2.65	-0.03
Justice Party of Denmark	575	2.45	+1.42
Green Left	520	2.21	-1.10
Christian People's Party	491	2.09	-1.53
Left Socialists	404	1.72	+0.46
Pensioners' Party	300	1.28	New
Total	23,507		

1975 Danish general election

Parties	Vote		
Parties	Votes	%	+ / -
Social Democrats	8,046	34.67	+4.87
Venstre	6,172	26.59	+9.43
Progress Party	2,558	11.02	-2.54
Social Liberals	1,975	8.51	-4.48
Conservatives	1,236	5.33	-2.67
Christian People's Party	840	3.62	+1.51
Green Left	769	3.31	-0.65
Communist Party of Denmark	621	2.68	+0.59
Centre Democrats	456	1.96	-5.70
Left Socialists	292	1.26	+0.37
Justice Party of Denmark	239	1.03	-0.75
Freddy Hertz	4	0.02	New
Total	23,208		

1973 Danish general election

Parties	Vote		
Parties	Votes	%	+ / -
Social Democrats	6,930	29.80	-11.48
Venstre	3,990	17.16	-3.35
Progress Party	3,153	13.56	New
Social Liberals	3,021	12.99	-1.95
Conservatives	1,861	8.00	-6.47
Centre Democrats	1,782	7.66	New
Green Left	921	3.96	-1.76
Christian People's Party	490	2.11	+1.28
Communist Party of Denmark	486	2.09	+1.34
Justice Party of Denmark	415	1.78	+1.04
Left Socialists	206	0.89	+0.12
Total	23,255		

1971 Danish general election

Parties	Vote		
Parties	Votes	%	+ / -
Social Democrats	9,274	41.28	+1.90
Venstre	4,607	20.51	-0.76
Social Liberals	3,356	14.94	-0.80
Conservatives	3,250	14.47	-1.87
Green Left	1,286	5.72	+1.76
Christian People's Party	186	0.83	New
Left Socialists	172	0.77	-0.33
Communist Party of Denmark	168	0.75	+0.36
Justice Party of Denmark	167	0.74	+0.33
Total	22,466		

=== General elections in the 1960s ===
1968 Danish general election

Parties	Vote		
Parties	Votes	%	+ / -
Social Democrats	7,502	39.38	-4.23
Venstre	4,052	21.27	-1.46
Conservatives	3,113	16.34	+0.96
Social Liberals	2,999	15.74	+6.22
Green Left	754	3.96	-1.36
Left Socialists	209	1.10	New
Liberal Centre	168	0.88	-0.77
Independent Party	99	0.52	-0.50
Justice Party of Denmark	78	0.41	-0.01
Communist Party of Denmark	74	0.39	+0.05
Total	19,048		

1966 Danish general election

Parties	Vote		
Parties	Votes	%	+ / -
Social Democrats	8,244	43.61	-2.48
Venstre	4,296	22.73	-0.64
Conservatives	2,907	15.38	-0.49
Social Liberals	1,800	9.52	+0.69
Green Left	1,005	5.32	+2.52
Liberal Centre	312	1.65	New
Independent Party	193	1.02	-0.55
Justice Party of Denmark	80	0.42	-0.21
Communist Party of Denmark	65	0.34	-0.30
Total	18,902		

1964 Danish general election

Parties	Vote		
Parties	Votes	%	+ / -
Social Democrats	8,465	46.09	+1.19
Venstre	4,292	23.37	-1.46
Conservatives	2,915	15.87	+1.11
Social Liberals	1,622	8.83	-1.23
Green Left	515	2.80	+0.09
Independent Party	289	1.57	+0.27
Communist Party of Denmark	117	0.64	+0.04
Justice Party of Denmark	116	0.63	-0.21
Danish Unity	35	0.19	New
Total	18,366		

1960 Danish general election

Parties	Vote		
Parties	Votes	%	+ / -
Social Democrats	7,880	44.90	+3.69
Venstre	4,359	24.83	-2.57
Conservatives	2,591	14.76	+2.01
Social Liberals	1,765	10.06	-3.94
Green Left	476	2.71	New
Independent Party	228	1.30	+0.67
Justice Party of Denmark	148	0.84	-1.51
Communist Party of Denmark	105	0.60	-1.06
Total	17,552		

=== General elections in the 1950s ===
1957 Danish general election

Parties	Vote		
Parties	Votes	%	+ / -
Social Democrats	7,112	41.21	-2.00
Venstre	4,729	27.40	+3.72
Social Liberals	2,417	14.00	-1.66
Conservatives	2,201	12.75	+0.64
Justice Party of Denmark	405	2.35	+0.68
Communist Party of Denmark	287	1.66	-0.84
Independent Party	109	0.63	-0.54
Total	17,260		

September 1953 Danish Folketing election

Parties	Vote		
Parties	Votes	%	+ / -
Social Democrats	7,215	43.21	+1.13
Venstre	3,953	23.68	+1.57
Social Liberals	2,614	15.66	-1.23
Conservatives	2,022	12.11	-0.54
Communist Party of Denmark	417	2.50	-0.33
Justice Party of Denmark	279	1.67	-1.55
Independent Party	196	1.17	New
Total	16,696		

April 1953 Danish Folketing election

Parties	Vote		
Parties	Votes	%	+ / -
Social Democrats	6,772	42.08	+1.23
Venstre	3,558	22.11	+1.45
Social Liberals	2,719	16.89	-1.76
Conservatives	2,036	12.65	-1.76
Justice Party of Denmark	519	3.22	+0.45
Communist Party of Denmark	456	2.83	+0.18
Danish Unity	34	0.21	New
Total	16,094		

1950 Danish Folketing election

Parties	Vote		
Parties	Votes	%	+ / -
Social Democrats	6,587	40.85	-1.07
Venstre	3,332	20.66	-4.11
Social Liberals	3,008	18.65	+2.18
Conservatives	2,324	14.41	+3.60
Justice Party of Denmark	446	2.77	+1.20
Communist Party of Denmark	428	2.65	-1.49
Total	16,125		

=== General elections in the 1940s ===
1947 Danish Folketing election

Parties	Vote		
Parties	Votes	%	+ / -
Social Democrats	6,882	41.92	+7.20
Venstre	4,066	24.77	+3.05
Social Liberals	2,704	16.47	-0.98
Conservatives	1,775	10.81	-3.76
Communist Party of Denmark	680	4.14	-5.11
Justice Party of Denmark	257	1.57	+0.74
Danish Unity	54	0.33	-1.13
Total	16,418		

1945 Danish Folketing election

Parties	Vote		
Parties	Votes	%	+ / -
Social Democrats	5,673	34.72	-9.43
Venstre	3,549	21.72	+0.06
Social Liberals	2,851	17.45	+4.34
Conservatives	2,380	14.57	-1.01
Communist Party of Denmark	1,512	9.25	New
Danish Unity	238	1.46	+0.22
Justice Party of Denmark	136	0.83	-0.31
Total	16,339		

1943 Danish Folketing election

Parties	Vote		
Parties	Votes	%	+ / -
Social Democrats	26,621	44.15	+1.57
Venstre	13,063	21.66	+2.99
Conservatives	9,393	15.58	+2.18
Social Liberals	7,908	13.11	-4.59
Farmers' Party	947	1.57	-1.62
National Socialist Workers' Party of Denmark	934	1.55	-0.10
Danish Unity	747	1.24	+0.94
Justice Party of Denmark	690	1.14	+0.13
Total	60,303		

=== General elections in the 1930s ===
1939 Danish Folketing election

Parties	Vote		
Parties	Votes	%	+ / -
Social Democrats	6,157	42.58	-3.32
Venstre	2,700	18.67	-0.48
Social Liberals	2,559	17.70	+0.45
Conservatives	1,938	13.40	+0.65
Farmers' Party	462	3.19	+0.70
National Socialist Workers' Party of Denmark	239	1.65	+1.32
Justice Party of Denmark	146	1.01	-0.30
Communist Party of Denmark	144	1.00	+0.18
National Cooperation	73	0.50	New
Danish Unity	43	0.30	New
Total	14,461		

1935 Danish Folketing election

Parties	Vote		
Parties	Votes	%	+ / -
Social Democrats	6,680	45.90	+3.13
Venstre	2,787	19.15	-5.89
Social Liberals	2,510	17.25	-0.13
Conservatives	1,855	12.75	-1.24
Independent People's Party	362	2.49	New
Justice Party of Denmark	191	1.31	+0.64
Communist Party of Denmark	119	0.82	+0.70
National Socialist Workers' Party of Denmark	48	0.33	New
Total	14,552		

1932 Danish Folketing election

Parties	Vote		
Parties	Votes	%	+ / -
Social Democrats	5,872	42.77	+0.71
Venstre	3,437	25.04	-0.06
Social Liberals	2,386	17.38	-3.11
Conservatives	1,920	13.99	+2.20
Justice Party of Denmark	92	0.67	+0.16
Communist Party of Denmark	17	0.12	+0.08
Frederik Petersen	4	0.03	New
Total	13,728		

=== General elections in the 1920s ===
1929 Danish Folketing election

Parties	Vote		
Parties	Votes	%	+ / -
Social Democrats	5,624	42.06	+5.72
Venstre	3,356	25.10	-0.59
Social Liberals	2,740	20.49	-2.59
Conservatives	1,577	11.79	-2.57
Justice Party of Denmark	68	0.51	+0.29
Communist Party of Denmark	6	0.04	-0.27
Total	13,371		

1926 Danish Folketing election

Parties	Vote		
Parties	Votes	%	+ / -
Social Democrats	4,579	36.34	+1.19
Venstre	3,237	25.69	+0.46
Social Liberals	2,909	23.08	-1.27
Conservatives	1,810	14.36	+1.26
Communist Party of Denmark	39	0.31	0.00
Justice Party of Denmark	28	0.22	+0.06
Total	12,602		

1924 Danish Folketing election

Parties	Vote		
Parties	Votes	%	+ / -
Social Democrats	4,310	35.15	+3.79
Venstre	3,094	25.23	-4.67
Social Liberals	2,986	24.35	+0.89
Conservatives	1,606	13.10	-1.27
Farmer Party	207	1.69	New
Communist Party of Denmark	38	0.31	New
Justice Party of Denmark	20	0.16	New
Industry Party	0	0.00	-0.91
Total	12,261		

September 1920 Danish Folketing election

Parties	Vote		
Parties	Votes	%	+ / -
Social Democrats	3,716	31.36	+2.67
Venstre	3,543	29.90	-1.07
Social Liberals	2,779	23.46	-0.14
Conservatives	1,702	14.37	-0.89
Industry Party	108	0.91	-0.57
Total	11,848		

July 1920 Danish Folketing election

Parties	Vote		
Parties	Votes	%	+ / -
Venstre	3,125	30.97	+2.09
Social Democrats	2,895	28.69	-1.85
Social Liberals	2,381	23.60	+1.58
Conservatives	1,540	15.26	-1.37
Industry Party	149	1.48	-0.45
Total	10,090		

April 1920 Danish Folketing election

Parties	Vote	
Parties	Votes	%
Social Democrats	3,172	30.54
Venstre	3,000	28.88
Social Liberals	2,287	22.02
Conservatives	1,728	16.63
Industry Party	201	1.93
Total	10,388	

== European Parliament elections results ==
2024 European Parliament election in Denmark

Parties	Vote		
Parties	Votes	%	+ / -
Social Democrats	3,672	18.98	-6.95
Green Left	3,421	17.69	+5.1
Venstre	2,650	13.70	-7.25
Danish People's Party	1,779	9.20	-3.91
Moderates	1,460	7.55	New
Denmark Democrats	1,441	7.45	New
Conservatives	1,344	6.95	+2.32
Red–Green Alliance	1,279	6.61	+0.31
Liberal Alliance	990	5.12	+3.79
Social Liberals	878	4.54	-2.77
The Alternative	429	2.22	-0.99
Total	19,343		

2019 European Parliament election in Denmark

Parties	Vote		
Parties	Votes	%	+ / -
Social Democrats	5,868	25.93	+6.90
Venstre	4,742	20.95	+4.87
Danish People's Party	2,968	13.11	-18.24
Green Left	2,850	12.59	+1.65
Social Liberals	1,655	7.31	+3.03
Red–Green Alliance	1,426	6.30	New
Conservatives	1,049	4.63	-2.35
People's Movement against the EU	1,049	4.63	-4.71
The Alternative	726	3.21	New
Liberal Alliance	301	1.33	-0.67
Total	22,634		

2014 European Parliament election in Denmark

Parties	Vote		
Parties	Votes	%	+ / -
Danish People's Party	6,329	31.35	+13.75
Social Democrats	3,842	19.03	-1.34
Venstre	3,246	16.08	-3.21
Green Left	2,208	10.94	-6.92
People's Movement against the EU	1,886	9.34	+1.59
Conservatives	1,410	6.98	-3.90
Social Liberals	865	4.28	+0.75
Liberal Alliance	404	2.00	+1.53
Total	20,190		

2009 European Parliament election in Denmark

Parties	Vote		
Parties	Votes	%	+ / -
Social Democrats	4,316	20.37	-14.10
Venstre	4,088	19.29	+1.08
Green Left	3,785	17.86	+10.09
Danish People's Party	3,728	17.60	+10.47
Conservatives	2,305	10.88	-0.60
People's Movement against the EU	1,642	7.75	+1.80
Social Liberals	748	3.53	-1.43
June Movement	476	2.25	-7.40
Liberal Alliance	99	0.47	New
Total	21,187		

2004 European Parliament election in Denmark

Parties	Vote		
Parties	Votes	%	+ / -
Social Democrats	5,019	34.47	+5.68
Venstre	2,652	18.21	-1.38
Conservatives	1,672	11.48	+3.29
June Movement	1,405	9.65	-5.04
Green Left	1,131	7.77	+1.18
Danish People's Party	1,038	7.13	+2.52
People's Movement against the EU	866	5.95	-0.92
Social Liberals	723	4.96	-1.57
Christian Democrats	56	0.38	-0.69
Total	14,562		

1999 European Parliament election in Denmark

Parties	Vote		
Parties	Votes	%	+ / -
Social Democrats	4,450	28.79	+3.94
Venstre	3,027	19.59	+0.85
June Movement	2,271	14.69	+1.42
Conservatives	1,266	8.19	-5.84
People's Movement against the EU	1,061	6.87	-3.92
Green Left	1,019	6.59	+0.75
Social Liberals	1,009	6.53	-1.89
Danish People's Party	712	4.61	New
Centre Democrats	475	3.07	+2.24
Christian Democrats	165	1.07	+0.72
Progress Party	81	0.52	-2.37
Total	15,455		

1994 European Parliament election in Denmark

Parties	Vote		
Parties	Votes	%	+ / -
Social Democrats	4,045	24.85	-5.53
Venstre	3,050	18.74	+2.32
Conservatives	2,284	14.03	+2.18
June Movement	2,160	13.27	New
People's Movement against the EU	1,756	10.79	-5.41
Social Liberals	1,371	8.42	+5.90
Green Left	950	5.84	-1.12
Progress Party	470	2.89	-2.67
Centre Democrats	135	0.83	-7.87
Christian Democrats	57	0.35	-1.07
Total	16,278		

1989 European Parliament election in Denmark

Parties	Vote		
Parties	Votes	%	+ / -
Social Democrats	4,507	30.38	+4.63
Venstre	2,436	16.42	+0.98
People's Movement against the EU	2,403	16.20	-1.54
Conservatives	1,758	11.85	-6.57
Centre Democrats	1,290	8.70	+1.55
Green Left	1,032	6.96	+0.91
Progress Party	825	5.56	+1.68
Social Liberals	374	2.52	-1.05
Christian Democrats	210	1.42	+0.24
Total	14,835		

1984 European Parliament election in Denmark

Parties	Vote	
Parties	Votes	%
Social Democrats	4,072	25.75
Conservatives	2,913	18.42
People's Movement against the EU	2,805	17.74
Venstre	2,442	15.44
Centre Democrats	1,131	7.15
Green Left	956	6.05
Progress Party	613	3.88
Social Liberals	565	3.57
Christian Democrats	187	1.18
Left Socialists	130	0.82
Total	15,814	

== Referendums ==
2022 Danish European Union opt-out referendum

Option	Votes	%
✓ YES	14,973	62.77
X NO	8,879	37.23

2015 Danish European Union opt-out referendum

Option	Votes	%
X NO	15,177	58.47
✓ YES	10,779	41.53

2014 Danish Unified Patent Court membership referendum

Option	Votes	%
✓ YES	11,806	59.44
X NO	8,055	40.56

2009 Danish Act of Succession referendum

Option	Votes	%
✓ YES	16,774	83.97
X NO	3,203	16.03

2000 Danish euro referendum

Option	Votes	%
X NO	14,885	57.65
✓ YES	10,935	42.35

1998 Danish Amsterdam Treaty referendum

Option	Votes	%
✓ YES	11,702	51.31
X NO	11,106	48.69

1993 Danish Maastricht Treaty referendum

Option	Votes	%
✓ YES	13,940	54.81
X NO	11,491	45.19

1992 Danish Maastricht Treaty referendum

Option	Votes	%
X NO	12,567	51.33
✓ YES	11,918	48.67

1986 Danish Single European Act referendum

Option	Votes	%
✓ YES	12,448	56.74
X NO	9,492	43.26

1972 Danish European Communities membership referendum

Option	Votes	%
✓ YES	16,572	71.02
X NO	6,763	28.98

1953 Danish constitutional and electoral age referendum

Option	Votes	%
✓ YES	11,572	84.93
X NO	2,053	15.07
23 years	8,014	57.59
21 years	5,902	42.41

1939 Danish constitutional referendum

Option	Votes	%
✓ YES	8,892	90.26
X NO	960	9.74
