= Odense South (nomination district) =

- Odense Syd
- Nomination district constituency for the Folketing
- Location of Odense Syd within Funen

- Location of Funen within Denmark
- Municipalities: Odense
- Constituency: Funen
- Electorate: 53,194 (2022)

Current constituency
- Created: 1895 (as constituency); 1920 (as nomination district)

Odense South nominating district is one of the 92 nominating districts that exists for Danish elections following the 2007 municipal reform. It is one of the three nomination districts in Odense Municipality, the others being Odense East and Odense West. It was established as a constituency in 1895 as Odense County 2, and became a nomination district in 1920. It was named Odense County 1 from 1964 to 1970. It obtained its current boundaries and name in 1970.

In general elections, the district tends to vote a bit more for parties commonly associated with the red bloc.

== General elections results ==
=== General elections in the 2020s ===
2022 Danish general election

Parties	Vote		
Parties	Votes	%	+ / -
Social Democrats	12,324	27.53	+1.65
Venstre	5,559	12.42	-11.67
Moderates	5,526	12.35	New
Green Left	4,127	9.22	+1.93
Liberal Alliance	3,637	8.13	+5.54
Conservatives	3,354	7.49	-0.59
Denmark Democrats	2,249	5.02	New
Red–Green Alliance	2,228	4.98	-1.73
Social Liberals	1,944	4.34	-5.71
The Alternative	1,330	2.97	-0.53
New Right	1,035	2.31	+0.54
Danish People's Party	853	1.91	-4.71
Independent Greens	392	0.88	New
Christian Democrats	167	0.37	-0.98
Millah Kongsbach	37	0.08	New
Total	44,762		

=== General elections in the 2010s ===
2019 Danish general election

Parties	Vote		
Parties	Votes	%	+ / -
Social Democrats	11,618	25.88	-0.64
Venstre	10,815	24.09	+5.37
Social Liberals	4,510	10.05	+5.02
Conservatives	3,627	8.08	+3.60
Green Left	3,273	7.29	+2.43
Red–Green Alliance	3,012	6.71	-1.79
Danish People's Party	2,971	6.62	-10.83
The Alternative	1,573	3.50	-1.58
Liberal Alliance	1,162	2.59	-6.22
New Right	794	1.77	New
Stram Kurs	613	1.37	New
Christian Democrats	604	1.35	+0.79
Klaus Riskær Pedersen Party	323	0.72	New
Total	44,895		

2015 Danish general election

Parties	Vote		
Parties	Votes	%	+ / -
Social Democrats	11,636	26.52	+1.71
Venstre	8,211	18.72	-6.46
Danish People's Party	7,656	17.45	+7.09
Liberal Alliance	3,864	8.81	+3.69
Red–Green Alliance	3,729	8.50	+2.41
The Alternative	2,227	5.08	New
Social Liberals	2,205	5.03	-6.01
Green Left	2,133	4.86	-5.22
Conservatives	1,964	4.48	-2.29
Christian Democrats	246	0.56	+0.06
Total	43,871		

2011 Danish general election

Parties	Vote		
Parties	Votes	%	+ / -
Venstre	10,988	25.18	+6.32
Social Democrats	10,827	24.81	+0.49
Social Liberals	4,820	11.04	+4.53
Danish People's Party	4,521	10.36	-2.12
Green Left	4,400	10.08	-4.32
Conservatives	2,953	6.77	-11.09
Red–Green Alliance	2,660	6.09	+4.17
Liberal Alliance	2,233	5.12	+2.01
Christian Democrats	220	0.50	-0.02
Michael Ellegård	12	0.03	+0.01
Lars Grønbæk Larsen	11	0.03	New
Total	43,645		

=== General elections in the 2000s ===
2007 Danish general election

Parties	Vote		
Parties	Votes	%	+ / -
Social Democrats	10,375	24.32	-1.48
Venstre	8,048	18.86	-1.80
Conservatives	7,619	17.86	-1.95
Green Left	6,144	14.40	+7.72
Danish People's Party	5,323	12.48	+1.02
Social Liberals	2,777	6.51	-3.74
New Alliance	1,327	3.11	New
Red–Green Alliance	819	1.92	-1.14
Christian Democrats	222	0.52	-0.65
Michael Ellegård	10	0.02	New
Total	42,664		

2005 Danish general election

Parties	Vote		
Parties	Votes	%	+ / -
Social Democrats	10,799	25.80	-1.91
Venstre	8,649	20.66	-2.65
Conservatives	8,295	19.81	-0.95
Danish People's Party	4,797	11.46	+1.51
Social Liberals	4,289	10.25	+4.74
Green Left	2,797	6.68	-0.26
Red–Green Alliance	1,280	3.06	+0.91
Christian Democrats	490	1.17	-0.55
Centre Democrats	373	0.89	-0.76
Minority Party	95	0.23	New
Total	41,864		

2001 Danish general election

Parties	Vote		
Parties	Votes	%	+ / -
Social Democrats	11,765	27.71	-7.10
Venstre	9,899	23.31	+1.59
Conservatives	8,816	20.76	+6.96
Danish People's Party	4,226	9.95	+3.80
Green Left	2,946	6.94	-2.24
Social Liberals	2,340	5.51	+0.55
Red–Green Alliance	915	2.15	-0.19
Christian People's Party	732	1.72	+0.04
Centre Democrats	700	1.65	-2.54
Progress Party	125	0.29	-0.58
Total	42,464		

=== General elections in the 1990s ===
1998 Danish general election

Parties	Vote		
Parties	Votes	%	+ / -
Social Democrats	14,955	34.81	-0.18
Venstre	9,331	21.72	+0.33
Conservatives	5,930	13.80	-4.40
Green Left	3,945	9.18	+1.17
Danish People's Party	2,644	6.15	New
Social Liberals	2,129	4.96	-0.62
Centre Democrats	1,802	4.19	+1.83
Red–Green Alliance	1,006	2.34	-0.34
Christian People's Party	723	1.68	+0.34
Progress Party	372	0.87	-4.50
Democratic Renewal	111	0.26	New
Svend Jensen	13	0.03	New
Total	42,961		

1994 Danish general election

Parties	Vote		
Parties	Votes	%	+ / -
Social Democrats	14,943	34.99	-0.81
Venstre	9,138	21.39	+6.16
Conservatives	7,773	18.20	-0.67
Green Left	3,420	8.01	-1.29
Social Liberals	2,382	5.58	+1.17
Progress Party	2,295	5.37	-0.52
Red–Green Alliance	1,145	2.68	+1.03
Centre Democrats	1,006	2.36	-2.08
Christian People's Party	572	1.34	-0.25
Leif Nybo	15	0.04	New
Bjørn Henriksen	9	0.02	New
Else Lundgaard	9	0.02	New
Michael Ellegård	5	0.01	New
Total	42,712		

1990 Danish general election

Parties	Vote		
Parties	Votes	%	+ / -
Social Democrats	14,682	35.80	+8.19
Conservatives	7,740	18.87	-4.67
Venstre	6,245	15.23	+7.40
Green Left	3,814	9.30	-5.18
Progress Party	2,414	5.89	-3.14
Centre Democrats	1,820	4.44	-0.41
Social Liberals	1,810	4.41	-2.34
Red–Green Alliance	677	1.65	New
Christian People's Party	651	1.59	+0.32
The Greens	549	1.34	-0.48
Common Course	357	0.87	-0.40
Justice Party of Denmark	218	0.53	New
Tage Abildgart	14	0.03	New
Humanist Party	11	0.03	New
Mogens Trondhjem	11	0.03	New
Total	41,013		

=== General elections in the 1980s ===
1988 Danish general election

Parties	Vote		
Parties	Votes	%	+ / -
Social Democrats	11,415	27.61	+1.04
Conservatives	9,729	23.54	-0.92
Green Left	5,984	14.48	-2.12
Progress Party	3,733	9.03	+4.02
Venstre	3,236	7.83	+1.13
Social Liberals	2,791	6.75	-1.10
Centre Democrats	2,003	4.85	-0.07
The Greens	751	1.82	+0.18
Common Course	526	1.27	-0.15
Christian People's Party	526	1.27	-0.34
Communist Party of Denmark	336	0.81	-0.04
Left Socialists	301	0.73	-0.93
Carl Erik Jørgensen	6	0.01	New
Total	41,337		

1987 Danish general election

Parties	Vote		
Parties	Votes	%	+ / -
Social Democrats	11,155	26.57	-2.71
Conservatives	10,271	24.46	-2.24
Green Left	6,971	16.60	+3.59
Social Liberals	3,297	7.85	+1.35
Venstre	2,813	6.70	-2.15
Progress Party	2,104	5.01	+2.40
Centre Democrats	2,067	4.92	-0.68
Left Socialists	697	1.66	-1.83
The Greens	687	1.64	New
Christian People's Party	677	1.61	-0.17
Common Course	595	1.42	New
Communist Party of Denmark	357	0.85	+0.25
Justice Party of Denmark	189	0.45	-1.04
Humanist Party	71	0.17	New
Socialist Workers Party	14	0.03	-0.01
Marxist–Leninists Party	13	0.03	-0.02
Henrik Nørregård Nielsen	6	0.01	New
Total	41,984		

1984 Danish general election

Parties	Vote		
Parties	Votes	%	+ / -
Social Democrats	11,900	29.28	-0.24
Conservatives	10,850	26.70	+8.41
Green Left	5,286	13.01	-0.50
Venstre	3,596	8.85	-0.16
Social Liberals	2,640	6.50	+0.83
Centre Democrats	2,276	5.60	-4.03
Left Socialists	1,419	3.49	+0.25
Progress Party	1,060	2.61	-4.61
Christian People's Party	722	1.78	+0.45
Justice Party of Denmark	605	1.49	+0.08
Communist Party of Denmark	243	0.60	-0.37
Marxist–Leninists Party	22	0.05	New
Socialist Workers Party	15	0.04	-0.02
Carl Erik Jørgensen	5	0.01	New
Total	40,639		

1981 Danish general election

Parties	Vote		
Parties	Votes	%	+ / -
Social Democrats	10,879	29.52	-6.52
Conservatives	6,738	18.29	+0.76
Green Left	4,979	13.51	+6.13
Centre Democrats	3,548	9.63	+5.54
Venstre	3,321	9.01	-0.17
Progress Party	2,660	7.22	-2.66
Social Liberals	2,089	5.67	+0.06
Left Socialists	1,193	3.24	-0.91
Justice Party of Denmark	521	1.41	-1.23
Christian People's Party	489	1.33	-0.40
Communist Party of Denmark	359	0.97	-0.49
Communist Workers Party	36	0.10	-0.21
Socialist Workers Party	21	0.06	New
Anders Bondo Christensen	16	0.04	New
Total	36,849		

=== General elections in the 1970s ===
1979 Danish general election

Parties	Vote		
Parties	Votes	%	+ / -
Social Democrats	13,454	36.04	-0.52
Conservatives	6,544	17.53	+3.38
Progress Party	3,687	9.88	-4.10
Venstre	3,427	9.18	+0.27
Green Left	2,755	7.38	+2.14
Social Liberals	2,095	5.61	+5.19
Left Socialists	1,550	4.15	+1.13
Centre Democrats	1,527	4.09	-3.77
Justice Party of Denmark	985	2.64	-0.48
Christian People's Party	645	1.73	-1.35
Communist Party of Denmark	544	1.46	-1.52
Communist Workers Party	115	0.31	New
Total	37,328		

1977 Danish general election

Parties	Vote		
Parties	Votes	%	+ / -
Social Democrats	12,753	36.56	+9.90
Conservatives	4,937	14.15	+4.53
Progress Party	4,877	13.98	+1.32
Venstre	3,106	8.91	-14.35
Centre Democrats	2,742	7.86	+5.84
Green Left	1,826	5.24	-0.19
Justice Party of Denmark	1,088	3.12	+1.48
Christian People's Party	1,075	3.08	-2.07
Left Socialists	1,052	3.02	+0.81
Communist Party of Denmark	1,038	2.98	-0.10
Pensioners' Party	240	0.69	New
Social Liberals	145	0.42	-7.84
Total	34,879		

1975 Danish general election

Parties	Vote		
Parties	Votes	%	+ / -
Social Democrats	9,408	26.66	+5.20
Venstre	8,210	23.26	+14.18
Progress Party	4,467	12.66	-2.54
Conservatives	3,395	9.62	-5.91
Social Liberals	2,915	8.26	-7.05
Green Left	1,915	5.43	-0.78
Christian People's Party	1,816	5.15	+1.78
Communist Party of Denmark	1,087	3.08	+0.55
Left Socialists	780	2.21	+0.58
Centre Democrats	713	2.02	-4.99
Justice Party of Denmark	578	1.64	-1.01
Oscar Andersen	6	0.02	New
Hans Clausen Pilegaard	2	0.01	New
Ivan Folmer-Larsen	1	0.00	New
E. Just Jensen	1	0.00	New
Gunner Pedersen	1	0.00	New
Total	35,295		

1973 Danish general election

Parties	Vote		
Parties	Votes	%	+ / -
Social Democrats	7,544	21.46	-11.41
Conservatives	5,458	15.53	-10.42
Social Liberals	5,380	15.31	-3.25
Progress Party	5,343	15.20	New
Venstre	3,193	9.08	-0.41
Centre Democrats	2,465	7.01	New
Green Left	2,184	6.21	-1.69
Christian People's Party	1,186	3.37	+2.04
Justice Party of Denmark	932	2.65	+1.16
Communist Party of Denmark	889	2.53	+1.55
Left Socialists	574	1.63	+0.21
Total	35,148		

1971 Danish general election

Parties	Vote		
Parties	Votes	%	+ / -
Social Democrats	10,787	32.87	-3.65
Conservatives	8,515	25.95	-0.88
Social Liberals	6,091	18.56	+2.58
Venstre	3,115	9.49	+1.08
Green Left	2,594	7.90	-0.19
Justice Party of Denmark	488	1.49	+1.02
Left Socialists	465	1.42	+0.14
Christian People's Party	437	1.33	New
Communist Party of Denmark	323	0.98	-0.14
Total	32,815		

=== General elections in the 1960s ===
1968 Danish general election

Parties	Vote		
Parties	Votes	%	+ / -
Social Democrats	16,019	47.27	-3.24
Conservatives	5,952	17.56	+0.35
Social Liberals	4,746	14.00	+8.11
Green Left	3,933	11.60	-5.81
Venstre	1,558	4.60	-0.12
Communist Party of Denmark	602	1.78	+0.46
Left Socialists	551	1.63	New
Liberal Centre	307	0.91	-1.06
Justice Party of Denmark	160	0.47	+0.09
Independent Party	63	0.19	-0.40
Total	33,891		

1966 Danish general election

Parties	Vote		
Parties	Votes	%	+ / -
Social Democrats	17,211	50.51	-5.60
Green Left	5,935	17.42	+7.55
Conservatives	5,866	17.21	-1.83
Social Liberals	2,008	5.89	+2.57
Venstre	1,609	4.72	-1.72
Liberal Centre	671	1.97	New
Communist Party of Denmark	449	1.32	-1.07
Independent Party	198	0.58	-0.86
Justice Party of Denmark	129	0.38	-0.27
Total	34,076		

1964 Danish general election

Parties	Vote		
Parties	Votes	%	+ / -
Social Democrats	18,245	56.11	-0.11
Conservatives	6,191	19.04	-0.03
Green Left	3,207	9.86	-0.37
Venstre	2,095	6.44	+0.04
Social Liberals	1,080	3.32	+0.54
Communist Party of Denmark	776	2.39	+0.05
Independent Party	468	1.44	+0.04
Justice Party of Denmark	211	0.65	-0.96
Peace Politics People's Party	165	0.51	New
Danish Unity	77	0.24	New
Total	32,515		

1960 Danish general election

Parties	Vote		
Parties	Votes	%	+ / -
Social Democrats	17,767	56.22	+1.00
Conservatives	6,008	19.01	+0.53
Green Left	3,234	10.23	New
Venstre	2,024	6.40	-2.63
Social Liberals	880	2.78	-1.97
Communist Party of Denmark	738	2.34	-5.06
Justice Party of Denmark	510	1.61	-2.77
Independent Party	444	1.40	+0.67
Total	31,605		

=== General elections in the 1950s ===
1957 Danish general election

Parties	Vote		
Parties	Votes	%	+ / -
Social Democrats	15,873	55.22	-2.81
Conservatives	5,313	18.48	+0.99
Venstre	2,595	9.03	+2.34
Communist Party of Denmark	2,127	7.40	-2.35
Social Liberals	1,366	4.75	+0.65
Justice Party of Denmark	1,259	4.38	+1.46
Independent Party	210	0.73	-0.30
Total	28,743		

September 1953 Danish Folketing election

Parties	Vote		
Parties	Votes	%	+ / -
Social Democrats	15,701	58.03	+17.86
Conservatives	4,732	17.49	-14.20
Communist Party of Denmark	2,639	9.75	+2.82
Venstre	1,810	6.69	-3.00
Social Liberals	1,110	4.10	-1.57
Justice Party of Denmark	789	2.92	-2.21
Independent Party	278	1.03	New
Total	27,059		

April 1953 Danish Folketing election

Parties	Vote		
Parties	Votes	%	+ / -
Social Democrats	9,697	40.17	+1.02
Conservatives	7,650	31.69	-2.81
Venstre	2,338	9.69	+2.85
Communist Party of Denmark	1,672	6.93	+0.60
Social Liberals	1,368	5.67	+1.03
Justice Party of Denmark	1,239	5.13	-3.41
Danish Unity	173	0.72	New
Total	24,137		

1950 Danish Folketing election

Parties	Vote		
Parties	Votes	%	+ / -
Social Democrats	9,576	39.15	-1.50
Conservatives	8,439	34.50	+8.18
Justice Party of Denmark	2,089	8.54	+1.78
Venstre	1,673	6.84	-4.74
Communist Party of Denmark	1,549	6.33	-2.58
Social Liberals	1,136	4.64	+0.26
Total	24,462		

=== General elections in the 1940s ===
1947 Danish Folketing election

Parties	Vote		
Parties	Votes	%	+ / -
Social Democrats	9,935	40.65	+11.83
Conservatives	6,433	26.32	-13.02
Venstre	2,830	11.58	+4.29
Communist Party of Denmark	2,178	8.91	-7.10
Justice Party of Denmark	1,653	6.76	+5.10
Social Liberals	1,070	4.38	+0.11
Danish Unity	340	1.39	-1.21
Total	24,439		

1945 Danish Folketing election

Parties	Vote		
Parties	Votes	%	+ / -
Conservatives	9,639	39.34	-5.00
Social Democrats	7,062	28.82	-12.30
Communist Party of Denmark	3,922	16.01	New
Venstre	1,786	7.29	+3.15
Social Liberals	1,047	4.27	-0.14
Danish Unity	638	2.60	-0.02
Justice Party of Denmark	406	1.66	+0.17
Total	24,500		

1943 Danish Folketing election

Parties	Vote		
Parties	Votes	%	+ / -
Conservatives	10,547	44.34	+5.97
Social Democrats	9,779	41.12	-1.88
Social Liberals	1,048	4.41	-1.15
Venstre	984	4.14	+0.21
Danish Unity	623	2.62	+1.54
National Socialist Workers' Party of Denmark	437	1.84	+0.36
Justice Party of Denmark	354	1.49	+0.17
Farmers' Party	12	0.05	-0.03
Total	23,784		

=== General elections in the 1930s ===
1939 Danish Folketing election

Parties	Vote		
Parties	Votes	%	+ / -
Social Democrats	8,100	43.00	-5.74
Conservatives	7,229	38.37	-0.29
Social Liberals	1,048	5.56	-0.14
Venstre	741	3.93	+1.30
National Cooperation	516	2.74	New
Communist Party of Denmark	459	2.44	+0.89
National Socialist Workers' Party of Denmark	278	1.48	+0.72
Justice Party of Denmark	249	1.32	-0.40
Danish Unity	203	1.08	New
Farmers' Party	15	0.08	-0.16
Total	18,838		

1935 Danish Folketing election

Parties	Vote		
Parties	Votes	%	+ / -
Social Democrats	9,059	48.74	+4.00
Conservatives	7,187	38.66	-3.53
Social Liberals	1,060	5.70	+0.40
Venstre	488	2.63	-1.60
Justice Party of Denmark	320	1.72	-0.61
Communist Party of Denmark	288	1.55	+0.35
National Socialist Workers' Party of Denmark	142	0.76	New
Independent People's Party	44	0.24	New
Total	18,588		

1932 Danish Folketing election

Parties	Vote		
Parties	Votes	%	+ / -
Social Democrats	7,744	44.74	-2.07
Conservatives	7,302	42.19	+2.69
Social Liberals	918	5.30	-0.50
Venstre	732	4.23	-1.59
Justice Party of Denmark	404	2.33	+0.76
Communist Party of Denmark	208	1.20	+0.70
Total	17,308		

=== General elections in the 1920s ===
1929 Danish Folketing election

Parties	Vote		
Parties	Votes	%	+ / -
Social Democrats	7,257	46.81	+3.47
Conservatives	6,123	39.50	-5.77
Venstre	903	5.82	+1.29
Social Liberals	899	5.80	+0.30
Justice Party of Denmark	244	1.57	+0.72
Communist Party of Denmark	77	0.50	0.00
Total	15,503		

1926 Danish Folketing election

Parties	Vote		
Parties	Votes	%	+ / -
Conservatives	6,622	45.27	+0.08
Social Democrats	6,340	43.34	+3.00
Social Liberals	804	5.50	-1.51
Venstre	663	4.53	-1.20
Justice Party of Denmark	125	0.85	+0.13
Communist Party of Denmark	73	0.50	-0.49
Total	14,627		

1924 Danish Folketing election

Parties	Vote		
Parties	Votes	%	+ / -
Conservatives	6,178	45.19	+2.15
Social Democrats	5,514	40.34	+3.06
Social Liberals	958	7.01	+1.12
Venstre	783	5.73	-1.12
Communist Party of Denmark	135	0.99	New
Justice Party of Denmark	98	0.72	New
Farmer Party	4	0.03	New
Total	13,670		

September 1920 Danish Folketing election

Parties	Vote		
Parties	Votes	%	+ / -
Conservatives	5,485	43.04	-2.87
Social Democrats	4,750	37.28	+5.54
Venstre	873	6.85	+0.22
Social Liberals	750	5.89	+1.09
Free Social Democrats	692	5.43	New
Danish Left Socialist Party	127	1.00	New
Industry Party	66	0.52	-0.01
Total	12,743		

July 1920 Danish Folketing election

Parties	Vote		
Parties	Votes	%	+ / -
Conservatives	4,829	45.91	-0.68
Social Democrats	3,338	31.74	+2.17
C. E. Marott	993	9.44	New
Venstre	697	6.63	+1.44
Social Liberals	505	4.80	-0.41
Niels Madsen	100	0.95	-0.03
Industry Party	56	0.53	New
Total	10,518		

April 1920 Danish Folketing election

Parties	Vote	
Parties	Votes	%
Conservatives	5,329	46.59
Social Democrats	3,382	29.57
Free Social Democrats	1,426	12.47
Social Liberals	596	5.21
Venstre	594	5.19
Niels Madsen	112	0.98
Total	11,439	

== European Parliament elections results ==
2024 European Parliament election in Denmark

Parties	Vote		
Parties	Votes	%	+ / -
Green Left	5,782	17.89	+3.72
Social Democrats	5,580	17.26	-5.24
Venstre	4,425	13.69	-7.27
Conservatives	3,530	10.92	+2.37
Social Liberals	2,760	8.54	-2.70
Liberal Alliance	2,249	6.96	+4.60
Moderates	2,171	6.72	New
Red–Green Alliance	2,077	6.43	+1.44
Danish People's Party	1,509	4.67	-3.80
Denmark Democrats	1,269	3.93	New
The Alternative	971	3.00	-1.00
Total	32,323		

2019 European Parliament election in Denmark

Parties	Vote		
Parties	Votes	%	+ / -
Social Democrats	8,128	22.50	+2.24
Venstre	7,570	20.96	+8.89
Green Left	5,117	14.17	+3.12
Social Liberals	4,060	11.24	+4.13
Conservatives	3,088	8.55	-9.74
Danish People's Party	3,059	8.47	-13.42
Red–Green Alliance	1,803	4.99	New
The Alternative	1,445	4.00	New
People's Movement against the EU	995	2.75	-4.02
Liberal Alliance	853	2.36	-0.21
Total	36,118		

2014 European Parliament election in Denmark

Parties	Vote		
Parties	Votes	%	+ / -
Danish People's Party	6,530	21.89	+9.71
Social Democrats	6,044	20.26	-5.19
Conservatives	5,458	18.29	-1.50
Venstre	3,601	12.07	-1.79
Green Left	3,296	11.05	-5.17
Social Liberals	2,120	7.11	+2.97
People's Movement against the EU	2,021	6.77	+1.49
Liberal Alliance	767	2.57	+2.01
Total	29,837		

2009 European Parliament election in Denmark

Parties	Vote		
Parties	Votes	%	+ / -
Social Democrats	7,726	25.45	-6.21
Conservatives	6,006	19.79	+0.29
Green Left	4,924	16.22	+6.67
Venstre	4,207	13.86	-0.52
Danish People's Party	3,698	12.18	+6.94
People's Movement against the EU	1,604	5.28	+1.22
Social Liberals	1,256	4.14	-2.88
June Movement	763	2.51	-5.30
Liberal Alliance	170	0.56	New
Total	30,354		

2004 European Parliament election in Denmark

Parties	Vote		
Parties	Votes	%	+ / -
Social Democrats	7,723	31.66	+15.69
Conservatives	4,755	19.50	+7.43
Venstre	3,508	14.38	-7.22
Green Left	2,330	9.55	+1.83
June Movement	1,905	7.81	-6.93
Social Liberals	1,713	7.02	-5.07
Danish People's Party	1,279	5.24	+0.08
People's Movement against the EU	990	4.06	-2.24
Christian Democrats	187	0.77	-0.71
Total	24,390		

1999 European Parliament election in Denmark

Parties	Vote		
Parties	Votes	%	+ / -
Venstre	5,429	21.60	+4.74
Social Democrats	4,015	15.97	+1.45
June Movement	3,706	14.74	-0.77
Social Liberals	3,040	12.09	+2.35
Conservatives	3,035	12.07	-9.35
Green Left	1,941	7.72	-1.16
People's Movement against the EU	1,584	6.30	-3.76
Danish People's Party	1,297	5.16	New
Centre Democrats	718	2.86	+2.17
Christian Democrats	373	1.48	+0.90
Progress Party	95	0.38	-1.38
Total	25,138		

1994 European Parliament election in Denmark

Parties	Vote		
Parties	Votes	%	+ / -
Conservatives	5,985	21.42	+3.86
Venstre	4,710	16.86	+3.21
June Movement	4,333	15.51	New
Social Democrats	4,056	14.52	-7.57
People's Movement against the EU	2,810	10.06	-7.51
Social Liberals	2,722	9.74	+6.30
Green Left	2,481	8.88	-1.20
Progress Party	491	1.76	-2.53
Centre Democrats	192	0.69	-8.79
Christian Democrats	162	0.58	-1.26
Total	27,942		

1989 European Parliament election in Denmark

Parties	Vote		
Parties	Votes	%	+ / -
Social Democrats	5,072	22.09	+4.36
People's Movement against the EU	4,033	17.57	-2.38
Conservatives	4,031	17.56	-10.64
Venstre	3,134	13.65	+6.22
Green Left	2,314	10.08	+0.11
Centre Democrats	2,177	9.48	+2.51
Progress Party	984	4.29	+1.72
Social Liberals	790	3.44	-0.16
Christian Democrats	422	1.84	-0.03
Total	22,957		

1984 European Parliament election in Denmark

Parties	Vote	
Parties	Votes	%
Conservatives	6,915	28.20
People's Movement against the EU	4,891	19.95
Social Democrats	4,348	17.73
Green Left	2,446	9.97
Venstre	1,821	7.43
Centre Democrats	1,709	6.97
Social Liberals	883	3.60
Progress Party	630	2.57
Christian Democrats	459	1.87
Left Socialists	420	1.71
Total	24,522	

== Referendums ==
2022 Danish European Union opt-out referendum

Option	Votes	%
✓ YES	25,484	72.64
X NO	9,600	27.36

2015 Danish European Union opt-out referendum

Option	Votes	%
✓ YES	19,258	52.49
X NO	17,428	47.51

2014 Danish Unified Patent Court membership referendum

Option	Votes	%
✓ YES	19,057	65.81
X NO	9,902	34.19

2009 Danish Act of Succession referendum

Option	Votes	%
✓ YES	23,847	85.68
X NO	3,987	14.32

2000 Danish euro referendum

Option	Votes	%
✓ YES	22,829	53.18
X NO	20,098	46.82

1998 Danish Amsterdam Treaty referendum

Option	Votes	%
✓ YES	22,757	61.18
X NO	14,437	38.82

1993 Danish Maastricht Treaty referendum

Option	Votes	%
✓ YES	26,298	60.44
X NO	17,210	39.56

1992 Danish Maastricht Treaty referendum

Option	Votes	%
✓ YES	21,706	52.07
X NO	19,983	47.93

1986 Danish Single European Act referendum

Option	Votes	%
✓ YES	20,686	58.11
X NO	14,915	41.89

1972 Danish European Communities membership referendum

Option	Votes	%
✓ YES	24,079	68.48
X NO	11,083	31.52

1953 Danish constitutional and electoral age referendum

Option	Votes	%
✓ YES	15,368	80.92
X NO	3,623	19.08
23 years	11,245	56.80
21 years	8,551	43.20

1939 Danish constitutional referendum

Option	Votes	%
✓ YES	13,500	94.89
X NO	727	5.11
