= Odense East (nomination district) =

- Odense Øst
- Nomination district constituency for the Folketing
- Location of Odense East within Funen

- Location of Funen within Denmark
- Municipalities: Odense
- Constituency: Funen
- Electorate: 53,406 (2022)

Current constituency
- Created: 1970

Odense East nominating district is one of the 92 nominating districts that exists for Danish elections following the 2007 municipal reform. It is one of the three nomination districts in Odense Municipality, the others being Odense West and Odense South. It was created in 1970 and has maintained its boundaries since then.

In general elections, the district is a very strong area for parties commonly associated with the red bloc.

== General elections results ==
=== General elections in the 2020s ===
2022 Danish general election

Parties	Vote		
Parties	Votes	%	+ / -
Social Democrats	12,411	30.17	+2.08
Green Left	4,299	10.45	+2.35
Moderates	3,952	9.61	New
Venstre	3,579	8.70	-8.27
Red–Green Alliance	2,928	7.12	-2.91
Liberal Alliance	2,921	7.10	+4.55
Conservatives	2,008	4.88	+0.19
Social Liberals	1,933	4.70	-8.50
Denmark Democrats	1,803	4.38	New
Independent Greens	1,725	4.19	New
The Alternative	1,549	3.77	-0.67
New Right	971	2.36	+0.77
Danish People's Party	850	2.07	-4.35
Christian Democrats	160	0.39	-0.58
Millah Kongsbach	44	0.11	New
Total	41,133		

=== General elections in the 2010s ===
2019 Danish general election

Parties	Vote		
Parties	Votes	%	+ / -
Social Democrats	12,015	28.09	-2.04
Venstre	7,259	16.97	+4.43
Social Liberals	5,646	13.20	+8.63
Red–Green Alliance	4,291	10.03	-2.71
Green Left	3,464	8.10	+2.45
Danish People's Party	2,745	6.42	-11.05
Conservatives	2,006	4.69	+1.86
The Alternative	1,901	4.44	-1.51
Liberal Alliance	1,091	2.55	-5.11
Stram Kurs	872	2.04	New
New Right	682	1.59	New
Christian Democrats	417	0.97	+0.50
Klaus Riskær Pedersen Party	390	0.91	New
Total	42,779		

2015 Danish general election

Parties	Vote		
Parties	Votes	%	+ / -
Social Democrats	12,493	30.13	-2.49
Danish People's Party	7,245	17.47	+7.20
Red–Green Alliance	5,282	12.74	+4.04
Venstre	5,199	12.54	-3.75
Liberal Alliance	3,176	7.66	+3.41
The Alternative	2,466	5.95	New
Green Left	2,343	5.65	-7.18
Social Liberals	1,895	4.57	-5.31
Conservatives	1,172	2.83	-1.90
Christian Democrats	194	0.47	+0.08
Total	41,465		

2011 Danish general election

Parties	Vote		
Parties	Votes	%	+ / -
Social Democrats	13,425	32.62	+1.37
Venstre	6,704	16.29	+2.65
Green Left	5,279	12.83	-6.00
Danish People's Party	4,227	10.27	-2.98
Social Liberals	4,066	9.88	+4.23
Red–Green Alliance	3,581	8.70	+5.99
Conservatives	1,948	4.73	-6.92
Liberal Alliance	1,748	4.25	+1.67
Christian Democrats	159	0.39	-0.06
Michael Ellegård	9	0.02	+0.01
Lars Grønbæk Larsen	4	0.01	New
Total	41,150		

=== General elections in the 2000s ===
2007 Danish general election

Parties	Vote		
Parties	Votes	%	+ / -
Social Democrats	12,459	31.25	-4.37
Green Left	7,507	18.83	+11.47
Venstre	5,439	13.64	-1.50
Danish People's Party	5,282	13.25	+1.24
Conservatives	4,645	11.65	-1.25
Social Liberals	2,251	5.65	-4.74
Red–Green Alliance	1,080	2.71	-1.42
New Alliance	1,028	2.58	New
Christian Democrats	181	0.45	-0.50
Michael Ellegård	3	0.01	New
Total	39,875		

2005 Danish general election

Parties	Vote		
Parties	Votes	%	+ / -
Social Democrats	13,643	35.62	-1.39
Venstre	5,798	15.14	-2.46
Conservatives	4,940	12.90	-1.53
Danish People's Party	4,601	12.01	+0.84
Social Liberals	3,980	10.39	+5.41
Green Left	2,819	7.36	-0.82
Red–Green Alliance	1,580	4.13	+1.04
Centre Democrats	470	1.23	-0.41
Christian Democrats	362	0.95	-0.44
Minority Party	110	0.29	New
Total	38,303		

2001 Danish general election

Parties	Vote		
Parties	Votes	%	+ / -
Social Democrats	14,263	37.01	-8.42
Venstre	6,782	17.60	+2.24
Conservatives	5,562	14.43	+5.74
Danish People's Party	4,303	11.17	+4.27
Green Left	3,151	8.18	-2.38
Social Liberals	1,920	4.98	+0.96
Red–Green Alliance	1,191	3.09	-0.04
Centre Democrats	632	1.64	-1.61
Christian People's Party	535	1.39	-0.01
Progress Party	197	0.51	-0.47
Total	38,536		

=== General elections in the 1990s ===
1998 Danish general election

Parties	Vote		
Parties	Votes	%	+ / -
Social Democrats	17,958	45.43	-1.55
Venstre	6,073	15.36	+0.36
Green Left	4,173	10.56	+1.23
Conservatives	3,434	8.69	-3.32
Danish People's Party	2,728	6.90	New
Social Liberals	1,591	4.02	-0.33
Centre Democrats	1,284	3.25	+1.46
Red–Green Alliance	1,237	3.13	-0.39
Christian People's Party	552	1.40	+0.34
Progress Party	387	0.98	-4.83
Democratic Renewal	109	0.28	New
Svend Jensen	7	0.02	New
Total	39,533		

1994 Danish general election

Parties	Vote		
Parties	Votes	%	+ / -
Social Democrats	18,339	46.98	-2.88
Venstre	5,854	15.00	+6.01
Conservatives	4,690	12.01	-0.24
Green Left	3,642	9.33	-1.50
Progress Party	2,267	5.81	+0.46
Social Liberals	1,699	4.35	+1.37
Red–Green Alliance	1,373	3.52	+1.46
Centre Democrats	697	1.79	-1.49
Christian People's Party	414	1.06	-0.04
Michael Ellegård	39	0.10	New
Leif Nybo	12	0.03	New
Else Lundgaard	6	0.02	New
Bjørn Henriksen	5	0.01	New
Total	39,037		

1990 Danish general election

Parties	Vote		
Parties	Votes	%	+ / -
Social Democrats	18,778	49.86	+9.37
Conservatives	4,615	12.25	-2.52
Green Left	4,080	10.83	-6.86
Venstre	3,385	8.99	+4.53
Progress Party	2,013	5.35	-2.75
Centre Democrats	1,237	3.28	+0.31
Social Liberals	1,124	2.98	-1.64
Red–Green Alliance	775	2.06	New
Common Course	509	1.35	-1.05
The Greens	484	1.29	-0.26
Christian People's Party	415	1.10	+0.05
Justice Party of Denmark	201	0.53	New
Tage Abildgart	23	0.06	New
Humanist Party	14	0.04	New
Mogens Trondhjem	6	0.02	New
Total	37,659		

=== General elections in the 1980s ===
1988 Danish general election

Parties	Vote		
Parties	Votes	%	+ / -
Social Democrats	15,386	40.49	+0.82
Green Left	6,722	17.69	-2.64
Conservatives	5,611	14.77	-0.79
Progress Party	3,079	8.10	+3.64
Social Liberals	1,756	4.62	-0.41
Venstre	1,695	4.46	+0.75
Centre Democrats	1,129	2.97	+0.07
Common Course	913	2.40	+0.07
The Greens	590	1.55	+0.24
Communist Party of Denmark	458	1.21	-0.04
Christian People's Party	398	1.05	-0.24
Left Socialists	255	0.67	-0.64
Carl Erik Jørgensen	3	0.01	New
Total	37,995		

1987 Danish general election

Parties	Vote		
Parties	Votes	%	+ / -
Social Democrats	15,349	39.67	-5.65
Green Left	7,866	20.33	+5.04
Conservatives	6,021	15.56	-2.14
Social Liberals	1,945	5.03	+0.75
Progress Party	1,726	4.46	+2.01
Venstre	1,436	3.71	-1.32
Centre Democrats	1,122	2.90	-0.43
Common Course	903	2.33	New
The Greens	507	1.31	New
Left Socialists	507	1.31	-1.33
Christian People's Party	498	1.29	-0.14
Communist Party of Denmark	484	1.25	+0.23
Justice Party of Denmark	164	0.42	-0.93
Humanist Party	96	0.25	New
Socialist Workers Party	32	0.08	0.00
Marxist–Leninists Party	26	0.07	+0.01
Henrik Nørregård Nielsen	9	0.02	New
Total	38,691		

1984 Danish general election

Parties	Vote		
Parties	Votes	%	+ / -
Social Democrats	17,245	45.32	-0.47
Conservatives	6,734	17.70	+6.78
Green Left	5,819	15.29	-0.21
Venstre	1,913	5.03	+0.30
Social Liberals	1,630	4.28	+0.45
Centre Democrats	1,268	3.33	-2.95
Left Socialists	1,004	2.64	+0.02
Progress Party	933	2.45	-3.43
Christian People's Party	546	1.43	+0.25
Justice Party of Denmark	513	1.35	+0.08
Communist Party of Denmark	390	1.02	-0.79
Socialist Workers Party	29	0.08	0.00
Marxist–Leninists Party	24	0.06	New
Carl Erik Jørgensen	5	0.01	New
Total	38,053		

1981 Danish general election

Parties	Vote		
Parties	Votes	%	+ / -
Social Democrats	15,672	45.79	-6.91
Green Left	5,307	15.50	+7.66
Conservatives	3,737	10.92	+1.06
Centre Democrats	2,151	6.28	+3.84
Progress Party	2,011	5.88	-2.14
Venstre	1,619	4.73	+0.14
Social Liberals	1,311	3.83	+0.01
Left Socialists	898	2.62	-1.03
Communist Party of Denmark	618	1.81	-0.96
Justice Party of Denmark	435	1.27	-1.30
Christian People's Party	403	1.18	-0.17
Communist Workers Party	32	0.09	-0.29
Socialist Workers Party	26	0.08	New
Anders Bondo Christensen	9	0.03	New
Total	34,229		

=== General elections in the 1970s ===
1979 Danish general election

Parties	Vote		
Parties	Votes	%	+ / -
Social Democrats	18,790	52.70	+1.88
Conservatives	3,517	9.86	+2.02
Progress Party	2,858	8.02	-2.31
Green Left	2,795	7.84	+1.97
Venstre	1,635	4.59	+0.56
Social Liberals	1,363	3.82	+1.42
Left Socialists	1,302	3.65	+1.19
Communist Party of Denmark	987	2.77	-2.68
Justice Party of Denmark	915	2.57	-0.35
Centre Democrats	870	2.44	-2.04
Christian People's Party	483	1.35	-0.77
Communist Workers Party	137	0.38	New
Total	35,652		

1977 Danish general election

Parties	Vote		
Parties	Votes	%	+ / -
Social Democrats	18,335	50.82	+7.77
Progress Party	3,726	10.33	-0.19
Conservatives	2,830	7.84	+2.27
Green Left	2,119	5.87	-1.47
Communist Party of Denmark	1,965	5.45	-0.67
Centre Democrats	1,615	4.48	+3.20
Venstre	1,453	4.03	-8.81
Justice Party of Denmark	1,053	2.92	+1.51
Left Socialists	889	2.46	+0.76
Social Liberals	866	2.40	-3.81
Christian People's Party	764	2.12	-1.82
Pensioners' Party	460	1.28	New
Total	36,075		

1975 Danish general election

Parties	Vote		
Parties	Votes	%	+ / -
Social Democrats	15,376	43.05	+7.07
Venstre	4,585	12.84	+8.57
Progress Party	3,756	10.52	-2.17
Green Left	2,620	7.34	-2.09
Social Liberals	2,218	6.21	-4.61
Communist Party of Denmark	2,185	6.12	+1.60
Conservatives	1,989	5.57	-3.38
Christian People's Party	1,406	3.94	+1.23
Left Socialists	606	1.70	+0.25
Justice Party of Denmark	504	1.41	-1.11
Centre Democrats	458	1.28	-5.38
Hans Clausen Pilegaard	8	0.02	New
E. Just Jensen	3	0.01	New
Gunner Pedersen	3	0.01	New
Oscar Andersen	0	0.00	New
Ivan Folmer-Larsen	0	0.00	New
Total	35,717		

1973 Danish general election

Parties	Vote		
Parties	Votes	%	+ / -
Social Democrats	12,974	35.98	-13.37
Progress Party	4,576	12.69	New
Social Liberals	3,902	10.82	-2.32
Green Left	3,399	9.43	-2.73
Conservatives	3,228	8.95	-5.90
Centre Democrats	2,400	6.66	New
Communist Party of Denmark	1,630	4.52	+2.39
Venstre	1,541	4.27	-0.45
Christian People's Party	979	2.71	+1.57
Justice Party of Denmark	908	2.52	+1.21
Left Socialists	522	1.45	+0.24
Total	36,059		

1971 Danish general election

Parties	Vote		
Parties	Votes	%	+ / -
Social Democrats	17,811	49.35	
Conservatives	5,359	14.85	
Social Liberals	4,743	13.14	
Green Left	4,389	12.16	
Venstre	1,704	4.72	
Communist Party of Denmark	767	2.13	
Justice Party of Denmark	473	1.31	
Left Socialists	437	1.21	
Christian People's Party	411	1.14	
Total	36,094		

== European Parliament elections results ==
2024 European Parliament election in Denmark

Parties	Vote		
Parties	Votes	%	+ / -
Green Left	5,646	20.86	+4.96
Social Democrats	4,953	18.30	-5.53
Red–Green Alliance	2,968	10.96	+2.59
Venstre	2,347	8.67	-5.56
Social Liberals	2,337	8.63	-4.50
Conservatives	2,218	8.19	+2.69
Liberal Alliance	1,584	5.85	+3.71
Danish People's Party	1,474	5.44	-2.95
Moderates	1,456	5.38	New
The Alternative	1,124	4.15	-0.97
Denmark Democrats	965	3.56	New
Total	27,072		

2019 European Parliament election in Denmark

Parties	Vote		
Parties	Votes	%	+ / -
Social Democrats	7,716	23.83	+0.86
Green Left	5,150	15.90	+2.48
Venstre	4,609	14.23	+5.04
Social Liberals	4,251	13.13	+6.20
Danish People's Party	2,718	8.39	-14.55
Red–Green Alliance	2,709	8.37	New
Conservatives	1,781	5.50	-7.20
The Alternative	1,658	5.12	New
People's Movement against the EU	1,094	3.38	-6.30
Liberal Alliance	694	2.14	-0.02
Total	32,380		

2014 European Parliament election in Denmark

Parties	Vote		
Parties	Votes	%	+ / -
Social Democrats	5,896	22.97	-8.45
Danish People's Party	5,889	22.94	+11.06
Green Left	3,446	13.42	-5.55
Conservatives	3,261	12.70	-1.55
People's Movement against the EU	2,484	9.68	+2.26
Venstre	2,358	9.19	+0.19
Social Liberals	1,780	6.93	+3.11
Liberal Alliance	555	2.16	+1.50
Total	25,669		

2009 European Parliament election in Denmark

Parties	Vote		
Parties	Votes	%	+ / -
Social Democrats	8,140	31.42	-7.77
Green Left	4,916	18.97	+7.63
Conservatives	3,691	14.25	+2.39
Danish People's Party	3,077	11.88	+6.36
Venstre	2,333	9.00	-1.33
People's Movement against the EU	1,922	7.42	+2.31
Social Liberals	989	3.82	-2.79
June Movement	671	2.59	-6.66
Liberal Alliance	170	0.66	New
Total	25,909		

2004 European Parliament election in Denmark

Parties	Vote		
Parties	Votes	%	+ / -
Social Democrats	7,930	39.19	+17.33
Conservatives	2,399	11.86	+3.45
Green Left	2,295	11.34	+2.61
Venstre	2,090	10.33	-4.41
June Movement	1,871	9.25	-9.15
Social Liberals	1,338	6.61	-4.01
Danish People's Party	1,116	5.52	-0.31
People's Movement against the EU	1,035	5.11	-2.47
Christian Democrats	161	0.80	-0.39
Total	20,235		

1999 European Parliament election in Denmark

Parties	Vote		
Parties	Votes	%	+ / -
Social Democrats	4,582	21.86	+1.21
June Movement	3,857	18.40	-0.38
Venstre	3,090	14.74	+3.01
Social Liberals	2,226	10.62	+2.32
Green Left	1,829	8.73	-1.09
Conservatives	1,763	8.41	-5.64
People's Movement against the EU	1,589	7.58	-5.90
Danish People's Party	1,223	5.83	New
Centre Democrats	554	2.64	+1.97
Christian Democrats	249	1.19	+0.66
Progress Party	87	0.42	-1.56
Total	20,962		

1994 European Parliament election in Denmark

Parties	Vote		
Parties	Votes	%	+ / -
Social Democrats	4,842	20.65	-12.52
June Movement	4,404	18.78	New
Conservatives	3,295	14.05	+3.57
People's Movement against the EU	3,160	13.48	-8.32
Venstre	2,751	11.73	+3.78
Green Left	2,303	9.82	-3.00
Social Liberals	1,947	8.30	+6.09
Progress Party	465	1.98	-1.96
Centre Democrats	156	0.67	-5.48
Christian Democrats	125	0.53	-0.95
Total	23,448		

1989 European Parliament election in Denmark

Parties	Vote		
Parties	Votes	%	+ / -
Social Democrats	6,529	33.17	+3.38
People's Movement against the EU	4,290	21.80	-1.51
Green Left	2,524	12.82	-0.37
Conservatives	2,063	10.48	-6.26
Venstre	1,564	7.95	+3.40
Centre Democrats	1,211	6.15	+1.32
Progress Party	775	3.94	+1.56
Social Liberals	435	2.21	-0.13
Christian Democrats	292	1.48	-0.11
Total	19,683		

1984 European Parliament election in Denmark

Parties	Vote	
Parties	Votes	%
Social Democrats	6,392	29.79
People's Movement against the EU	5,003	23.31
Conservatives	3,592	16.74
Green Left	2,831	13.19
Centre Democrats	1,036	4.83
Venstre	976	4.55
Progress Party	510	2.38
Social Liberals	503	2.34
Christian Democrats	341	1.59
Left Socialists	275	1.28
Total	21,459	

== Referendums ==
2022 Danish European Union opt-out referendum

Option	Votes	%
✓ YES	20,137	66.63
X NO	10,084	33.37

2015 Danish European Union opt-out referendum

Option	Votes	%
X NO	18,159	55.13
✓ YES	14,779	44.87

2014 Danish Unified Patent Court membership referendum

Option	Votes	%
✓ YES	14,521	58.27
X NO	10,401	41.73

2009 Danish Act of Succession referendum

Option	Votes	%
✓ YES	19,602	82.93
X NO	4,035	17.07

2000 Danish euro referendum

Option	Votes	%
X NO	21,858	55.22
✓ YES	17,728	44.78

1998 Danish Amsterdam Treaty referendum

Option	Votes	%
✓ YES	17,149	50.92
X NO	16,528	49.08

1993 Danish Maastricht Treaty referendum

Option	Votes	%
X NO	20,550	50.97
✓ YES	19,767	49.03

1992 Danish Maastricht Treaty referendum

Option	Votes	%
X NO	23,151	60.27
✓ YES	15,262	39.73

1986 Danish Single European Act referendum

Option	Votes	%
X NO	18,436	58.14
✓ YES	13,273	41.86

1972 Danish European Communities membership referendum

Option	Votes	%
✓ YES	21,431	57.72
X NO	15,700	42.28
