= Odense West (nomination district) =

- Odense Vest
- Nomination district constituency for the Folketing
- Location of Odense West within Funen

- Location of Funen within Denmark
- Municipalities: Odense
- Constituency: Funen
- Electorate: 46,942 (2022)

Current constituency
- Created: 1970

Odense West nominating district is one of the 92 nominating districts that exists for Danish elections following the 2007 municipal reform. It is one of the three nomination districts in Odense Municipality, the others being Odense East and Odense South. It was created in 1970 and has maintained its boundaries since then.

In general elections, parties commonly associated with the red bloc tends to get a bit more votes.

== General elections results ==
=== General elections in the 2020s ===
2022 Danish general election

Parties	Vote		
Parties	Votes	%	+ / -
Social Democrats	12,280	32.19	+1.09
Venstre	4,152	10.88	-10.11
Moderates	3,952	10.36	New
Green Left	3,524	9.24	+1.53
Liberal Alliance	2,828	7.41	+5.07
Denmark Democrats	2,277	5.97	New
Conservatives	2,210	5.79	-0.65
Red–Green Alliance	1,987	5.21	-1.80
Social Liberals	1,382	3.62	-3.76
The Alternative	1,165	3.05	-0.23
New Right	1,076	2.82	+1.10
Danish People's Party	867	2.27	-5.91
Independent Greens	288	0.75	New
Christian Democrats	131	0.34	-0.72
Millah Kongsbach	34	0.09	New
Total	38,153		

=== General elections in the 2010s ===
2019 Danish general election

Parties	Vote		
Parties	Votes	%	+ / -
Social Democrats	11,677	31.10	+0.48
Venstre	7,881	20.99	+5.85
Danish People's Party	3,070	8.18	-12.52
Green Left	2,894	7.71	+2.63
Social Liberals	2,770	7.38	+3.69
Red–Green Alliance	2,630	7.01	-1.78
Conservatives	2,418	6.44	+2.73
The Alternative	1,233	3.28	-1.34
Liberal Alliance	879	2.34	-4.94
Stram Kurs	736	1.96	New
New Right	645	1.72	New
Christian Democrats	398	1.06	+0.68
Klaus Riskær Pedersen Party	311	0.83	New
Total	37,542		

2015 Danish general election

Parties	Vote		
Parties	Votes	%	+ / -
Social Democrats	11,305	30.62	+0.48
Danish People's Party	7,641	20.70	+8.50
Venstre	5,590	15.14	-6.26
Red–Green Alliance	3,246	8.79	+2.11
Liberal Alliance	2,687	7.28	+3.21
Green Left	1,877	5.08	-5.51
The Alternative	1,705	4.62	New
Conservatives	1,369	3.71	-2.37
Social Liberals	1,362	3.69	-4.80
Christian Democrats	139	0.38	+0.07
Total	36,921		

2011 Danish general election

Parties	Vote		
Parties	Votes	%	+ / -
Social Democrats	11,028	30.14	+1.16
Venstre	7,830	21.40	+5.21
Danish People's Party	4,462	12.20	-2.32
Green Left	3,876	10.59	-4.30
Social Liberals	3,107	8.49	+3.78
Red–Green Alliance	2,445	6.68	+4.88
Conservatives	2,224	6.08	-10.21
Liberal Alliance	1,490	4.07	+1.80
Christian Democrats	113	0.31	-0.02
Michael Ellegård	9	0.02	0.00
Lars Grønbæk Larsen	4	0.01	New
Total	36,588		

=== General elections in the 2000s ===
2007 Danish general election

Parties	Vote		
Parties	Votes	%	+ / -
Social Democrats	10,323	28.98	-3.02
Conservatives	5,802	16.29	-1.15
Venstre	5,768	16.19	-1.33
Green Left	5,305	14.89	+7.94
Danish People's Party	5,173	14.52	+1.87
Social Liberals	1,676	4.71	-3.56
New Alliance	807	2.27	New
Red–Green Alliance	640	1.80	-1.33
Christian Democrats	116	0.33	-0.52
Michael Ellegård	7	0.02	New
Total	35,617		

2005 Danish general election

Parties	Vote		
Parties	Votes	%	+ / -
Social Democrats	11,079	32.00	-2.22
Venstre	6,065	17.52	-1.11
Conservatives	6,038	17.44	-1.39
Danish People's Party	4,380	12.65	+1.08
Social Liberals	2,864	8.27	+3.98
Green Left	2,407	6.95	+0.11
Red–Green Alliance	1,082	3.13	+0.87
Centre Democrats	336	0.97	-0.60
Christian Democrats	294	0.85	-0.50
Minority Party	74	0.21	New
Total	34,619		

2001 Danish general election

Parties	Vote		
Parties	Votes	%	+ / -
Social Democrats	12,063	34.22	-9.77
Conservatives	6,637	18.83	+7.54
Venstre	6,566	18.63	+1.53
Danish People's Party	4,080	11.57	+4.82
Green Left	2,410	6.84	-2.01
Social Liberals	1,513	4.29	+0.63
Red–Green Alliance	798	2.26	+0.02
Centre Democrats	554	1.57	-2.02
Christian People's Party	477	1.35	+0.01
Progress Party	154	0.44	-0.47
Total	35,252		

=== General elections in the 1990s ===
1998 Danish general election

Parties	Vote		
Parties	Votes	%	+ / -
Social Democrats	15,744	43.99	-0.57
Venstre	6,121	17.10	+0.19
Conservatives	4,040	11.29	-2.77
Green Left	3,167	8.85	+0.96
Danish People's Party	2,415	6.75	New
Social Liberals	1,309	3.66	-0.83
Centre Democrats	1,283	3.59	+1.36
Red–Green Alliance	800	2.24	-0.42
Christian People's Party	480	1.34	+0.34
Progress Party	324	0.91	-5.18
Democratic Renewal	100	0.28	New
Svend Jensen	5	0.01	New
Total	35,788		

1994 Danish general election

Parties	Vote		
Parties	Votes	%	+ / -
Social Democrats	15,718	44.56	-2.08
Venstre	5,963	16.91	+5.25
Conservatives	4,959	14.06	+0.47
Green Left	2,782	7.89	-1.12
Progress Party	2,147	6.09	+0.07
Social Liberals	1,584	4.49	+1.33
Red–Green Alliance	939	2.66	+1.05
Centre Democrats	788	2.23	-1.95
Christian People's Party	354	1.00	-0.08
Michael Ellegård	16	0.05	New
Leif Nybo	10	0.03	New
Else Lundgaard	8	0.02	New
Bjørn Henriksen	3	0.01	New
Total	35,271		

1990 Danish general election

Parties	Vote		
Parties	Votes	%	+ / -
Social Democrats	15,906	46.64	+9.43
Conservatives	4,634	13.59	-3.23
Venstre	3,978	11.66	+5.41
Green Left	3,073	9.01	-6.34
Progress Party	2,053	6.02	-3.51
Centre Democrats	1,424	4.18	+0.35
Social Liberals	1,077	3.16	-2.48
Red–Green Alliance	550	1.61	New
The Greens	439	1.29	-0.31
Christian People's Party	370	1.08	+0.08
Common Course	361	1.06	-0.73
Justice Party of Denmark	216	0.63	New
Tage Abildgart	13	0.04	New
Mogens Trondhjem	6	0.02	New
Humanist Party	4	0.01	New
Total	34,104		

=== General elections in the 1980s ===
1988 Danish general election

Parties	Vote		
Parties	Votes	%	+ / -
Social Democrats	12,736	37.21	+1.18
Conservatives	5,756	16.82	-1.07
Green Left	5,252	15.35	-2.65
Progress Party	3,262	9.53	+4.65
Venstre	2,140	6.25	+0.32
Social Liberals	1,929	5.64	-0.35
Centre Democrats	1,311	3.83	-0.19
Common Course	613	1.79	+0.08
The Greens	547	1.60	+0.22
Christian People's Party	341	1.00	-0.29
Communist Party of Denmark	315	0.92	+0.06
Left Socialists	19	0.06	-1.12
Carl Erik Jørgensen	5	0.01	New
Total	34,226		

1987 Danish general election

Parties	Vote		
Parties	Votes	%	+ / -
Social Democrats	12,552	36.03	-2.76
Green Left	6,272	18.00	+4.08
Conservatives	6,232	17.89	-2.78
Social Liberals	2,088	5.99	+0.65
Venstre	2,067	5.93	-1.84
Progress Party	1,699	4.88	+2.07
Centre Democrats	1,402	4.02	-0.42
Common Course	597	1.71	New
The Greens	481	1.38	New
Christian People's Party	450	1.29	-0.10
Left Socialists	412	1.18	-1.42
Communist Party of Denmark	300	0.86	+0.22
Justice Party of Denmark	186	0.53	-1.01
Humanist Party	62	0.18	New
Socialist Workers Party	16	0.05	+0.02
Marxist–Leninists Party	14	0.04	-0.02
Henrik Nørregård Nielsen	8	0.02	New
Total	34,838		

1984 Danish general election

Parties	Vote		
Parties	Votes	%	+ / -
Social Democrats	13,481	38.79	-0.55
Conservatives	7,183	20.67	+8.16
Green Left	4,837	13.92	-0.08
Venstre	2,699	7.77	+0.18
Social Liberals	1,855	5.34	+0.43
Centre Democrats	1,543	4.44	-3.81
Progress Party	978	2.81	-4.15
Left Socialists	902	2.60	+0.02
Justice Party of Denmark	535	1.54	-0.02
Christian People's Party	484	1.39	+0.36
Communist Party of Denmark	224	0.64	-0.49
Marxist–Leninists Party	20	0.06	New
Socialist Workers Party	9	0.03	-0.03
Carl Erik Jørgensen	5	0.01	New
Total	34,755		

1981 Danish general election

Parties	Vote		
Parties	Votes	%	+ / -
Social Democrats	12,253	39.34	-6.57
Green Left	4,361	14.00	+6.48
Conservatives	3,897	12.51	+0.99
Centre Democrats	2,568	8.25	+5.29
Venstre	2,363	7.59	-0.04
Progress Party	2,168	6.96	-2.70
Social Liberals	1,530	4.91	+0.23
Left Socialists	805	2.58	-1.04
Justice Party of Denmark	485	1.56	-1.38
Communist Party of Denmark	352	1.13	-0.82
Christian People's Party	322	1.03	-0.21
Socialist Workers Party	20	0.06	New
Communist Workers Party	19	0.06	-0.31
Anders Bondo Christensen	2	0.01	New
Total	31,145		

=== General elections in the 1970s ===
1979 Danish general election

Parties	Vote		
Parties	Votes	%	+ / -
Social Democrats	14,744	45.91	+1.88
Conservatives	3,700	11.52	+2.92
Progress Party	3,101	9.66	-2.94
Venstre	2,449	7.63	+0.49
Green Left	2,416	7.52	+2.26
Social Liberals	1,502	4.68	+1.54
Left Socialists	1,162	3.62	+1.16
Centre Democrats	952	2.96	-3.19
Justice Party of Denmark	945	2.94	-0.39
Communist Party of Denmark	626	1.95	-2.29
Christian People's Party	398	1.24	-0.94
Communist Workers Party	120	0.37	New
Total	32,115		

1977 Danish general election

Parties	Vote		
Parties	Votes	%	+ / -
Social Democrats	13,798	44.03	+8.14
Progress Party	3,948	12.60	+0.31
Conservatives	2,695	8.60	+2.60
Venstre	2,237	7.14	-11.05
Centre Democrats	1,927	6.15	+4.51
Green Left	1,649	5.26	-1.24
Communist Party of Denmark	1,330	4.24	-0.46
Justice Party of Denmark	1,043	3.33	+1.69
Social Liberals	985	3.14	-4.00
Left Socialists	772	2.46	+0.83
Christian People's Party	682	2.18	-2.13
Pensioners' Party	271	0.86	New
Total	31,337		

1975 Danish general election

Parties	Vote		
Parties	Votes	%	+ / -
Social Democrats	11,082	35.89	+6.91
Venstre	5,616	18.19	+11.04
Progress Party	3,794	12.29	-2.89
Social Liberals	2,205	7.14	-5.67
Green Left	2,006	6.50	-1.05
Conservatives	1,852	6.00	-3.91
Communist Party of Denmark	1,452	4.70	+1.24
Christian People's Party	1,331	4.31	+1.84
Justice Party of Denmark	507	1.64	-1.24
Centre Democrats	507	1.64	-6.68
Left Socialists	504	1.63	+0.35
E. Just Jensen	6	0.02	New
Gunner Pedersen	6	0.02	New
Hans Clausen Pilegaard	5	0.02	New
Oscar Andersen	3	0.01	New
Ivan Folmer-Larsen	0	0.00	New
Total	30,876		

1973 Danish general election

Parties	Vote		
Parties	Votes	%	+ / -
Social Democrats	8,937	28.98	-14.66
Progress Party	4,682	15.18	New
Social Liberals	3,952	12.81	-2.38
Conservatives	3,056	9.91	-6.13
Centre Democrats	2,567	8.32	New
Green Left	2,330	7.55	-3.18
Venstre	2,204	7.15	-2.06
Communist Party of Denmark	1,067	3.46	+1.77
Justice Party of Denmark	889	2.88	+1.59
Christian People's Party	762	2.47	+1.53
Left Socialists	396	1.28	+0.01
Total	30,842		

1971 Danish general election

Parties	Vote		
Parties	Votes	%	+ / -
Social Democrats	12,859	43.64	
Conservatives	4,726	16.04	
Social Liberals	4,477	15.19	
Green Left	3,163	10.73	
Venstre	2,713	9.21	
Communist Party of Denmark	499	1.69	
Justice Party of Denmark	380	1.29	
Left Socialists	374	1.27	
Christian People's Party	278	0.94	
Total	29,469		

== European Parliament elections results ==
2024 European Parliament election in Denmark

Parties	Vote		
Parties	Votes	%	+ / -
Social Democrats	5,122	19.47	-6.55
Green Left	4,987	18.96	+4.59
Venstre	3,039	11.55	-6.87
Conservatives	2,415	9.18	+2.06
Social Liberals	1,919	7.29	-1.72
Red–Green Alliance	1,870	7.11	+1.30
Liberal Alliance	1,701	6.47	+4.46
Danish People's Party	1,638	6.23	-3.73
Moderates	1,433	5.45	New
Denmark Democrats	1,297	4.93	New
The Alternative	887	3.37	-0.47
Total	26,308		

2019 European Parliament election in Denmark

Parties	Vote		
Parties	Votes	%	+ / -
Social Democrats	7,513	26.02	+4.34
Venstre	5,318	18.42	+9.26
Green Left	4,150	14.37	+4.19
Danish People's Party	2,877	9.96	-15.82
Social Liberals	2,603	9.01	+3.91
Conservatives	2,056	7.12	-11.09
Red–Green Alliance	1,679	5.81	New
The Alternative	1,109	3.84	New
People's Movement against the EU	993	3.44	-4.34
Liberal Alliance	579	2.01	-0.10
Total	28,877		

2014 European Parliament election in Denmark

Parties	Vote		
Parties	Votes	%	+ / -
Danish People's Party	6,310	25.78	+12.25
Social Democrats	5,306	21.68	-7.48
Conservatives	4,456	18.21	-1.15
Green Left	2,492	10.18	-5.12
Venstre	2,242	9.16	-1.10
People's Movement against the EU	1,904	7.78	+1.43
Social Liberals	1,249	5.10	+2.16
Liberal Alliance	516	2.11	+1.67
Total	24,475		

2009 European Parliament election in Denmark

Parties	Vote		
Parties	Votes	%	+ / -
Social Democrats	7,071	29.16	-8.51
Conservatives	4,696	19.36	+3.19
Green Left	3,710	15.30	+6.37
Danish People's Party	3,281	13.53	+7.69
Venstre	2,487	10.26	-1.35
People's Movement against the EU	1,540	6.35	+1.76
Social Liberals	714	2.94	-2.18
June Movement	644	2.66	-6.84
Liberal Alliance	107	0.44	New
Total	24,250		

2004 European Parliament election in Denmark

Parties	Vote		
Parties	Votes	%	+ / -
Social Democrats	7,060	37.67	+16.17
Conservatives	3,031	16.17	+6.92
Venstre	2,176	11.61	-5.13
June Movement	1,780	9.50	-7.88
Green Left	1,674	8.93	+1.00
Danish People's Party	1,095	5.84	-0.19
Social Liberals	959	5.12	-4.60
People's Movement against the EU	860	4.59	-2.86
Christian Democrats	105	0.56	-0.53
Total	18,740		

1999 European Parliament election in Denmark

Parties	Vote		
Parties	Votes	%	+ / -
Social Democrats	4,177	21.50	+1.95
June Movement	3,376	17.38	-0.05
Venstre	3,252	16.74	+2.43
Social Liberals	1,889	9.72	+0.49
Conservatives	1,797	9.25	-6.65
Green Left	1,540	7.93	-1.23
People's Movement against the EU	1,447	7.45	-3.78
Danish People's Party	1,171	6.03	New
Centre Democrats	570	2.93	+2.22
Christian Democrats	211	1.09	+0.56
Progress Party	77	0.40	-1.54
Total	19,430		

1994 European Parliament election in Denmark

Parties	Vote		
Parties	Votes	%	+ / -
Social Democrats	4,163	19.55	-11.29
June Movement	3,710	17.43	New
Conservatives	3,385	15.90	+4.10
Venstre	3,047	14.31	+2.86
People's Movement against the EU	2,391	11.23	-8.22
Social Liberals	1,966	9.23	+6.71
Green Left	1,951	9.16	-1.45
Progress Party	414	1.94	-2.42
Centre Democrats	152	0.71	-6.86
Christian Democrats	112	0.53	-0.87
Total	21,291		

1989 European Parliament election in Denmark

Parties	Vote		
Parties	Votes	%	+ / -
Social Democrats	5,391	30.84	+5.99
People's Movement against the EU	3,399	19.45	-2.41
Conservatives	2,062	11.80	-8.26
Venstre	2,001	11.45	+4.39
Green Left	1,855	10.61	-1.30
Centre Democrats	1,324	7.57	+1.58
Progress Party	763	4.36	+1.86
Social Liberals	440	2.52	-0.38
Christian Democrats	245	1.40	-0.11
Total	17,480		

1984 European Parliament election in Denmark

Parties	Vote	
Parties	Votes	%
Social Democrats	4,802	24.85
People's Movement against the EU	4,225	21.86
Conservatives	3,877	20.06
Green Left	2,301	11.91
Venstre	1,365	7.06
Centre Democrats	1,158	5.99
Social Liberals	561	2.90
Progress Party	484	2.50
Christian Democrats	291	1.51
Left Socialists	260	1.35
Total	19,324	

== Referendums ==
2022 Danish European Union opt-out referendum

Option	Votes	%
✓ YES	19,795	68.36
X NO	9,162	31.64

2015 Danish European Union opt-out referendum

Option	Votes	%
X NO	16,592	54.35
✓ YES	13,938	45.65

2014 Danish Unified Patent Court membership referendum

Option	Votes	%
✓ YES	14,676	61.78
X NO	9,078	38.22

2009 Danish Act of Succession referendum

Option	Votes	%
✓ YES	19,145	84.59
X NO	3,487	15.41

2000 Danish euro referendum

Option	Votes	%
X NO	19,361	53.81
✓ YES	16,619	46.19

1998 Danish Amsterdam Treaty referendum

Option	Votes	%
✓ YES	16,821	54.37
X NO	14,117	45.63

1993 Danish Maastricht Treaty referendum

Option	Votes	%
✓ YES	19,426	54.23
X NO	16,393	45.77

1992 Danish Maastricht Treaty referendum

Option	Votes	%
X NO	18,970	55.21
✓ YES	15,391	44.79

1986 Danish Single European Act referendum

Option	Votes	%
X NO	14,654	50.08
✓ YES	14,610	49.92

1972 Danish European Communities membership referendum

Option	Votes	%
✓ YES	19,494	62.08
X NO	11,906	37.92
