= Results of the 2014 European Parliament election in Denmark =

This is a list of the results in the 2014 European Parliament election in Denmark. The results are as found on the official website dedicated to the results made by Statistics Denmark.

== Denmark ==
Division	A	B	C	F	I	N	O	V
Division	%	%	%	%	%	%	%	%
Denmark	19.1	6.5	9.1	11.0	2.9	8.1	26.6	16.7

== Vote share by electoral division ==
Division	A	B	C	F	I	N	O	V
Division	%	%	%	%	%	%	%	%
Mid & Northern Jutland	19.6	5.5	8.3	9.7	2.9	7.3	27.0	19.6
Zealand & Southern Denmark	18.9	4.7	10.1	8.9	2.4	7.3	30.2	17.6
Capital	18.9	9.7	8.9	14.6	3.5	9.8	22.1	12.6

== Vote share by constituency ==
Division	A	B	C	F	I	N	O	V
Division	%	%	%	%	%	%	%	%
North Jutland	21.9	4.2	8.1	8.1	3.0	7.9	28.4	18.5
West Jutland	16.9	4.8	10.0	7.6	2.3	5.5	28.3	24.4
East Jutland	19.9	6.9	7.4	12.3	3.2	7.9	25.2	17.2
South Jutland	17.6	4.2	8.6	7.0	2.6	6.0	31.6	22.4
Funen	20.7	5.1	16.3	10.2	1.9	7.7	25.5	12.6
Zealand	18.8	4.9	7.5	9.6	2.4	8.1	31.9	16.8
North Zealand	16.2	8.4	11.3	10.6	4.1	6.6	25.0	17.8
Greater Copenhagen	20.1	7.7	9.9	11.0	3.2	8.8	27.0	12.3
Copenhagen	18.8	12.4	6.7	20.5	3.3	12.8	16.3	9.0
Bornholm	36.4	2.6	5.4	6.6	1.1	9.6	23.6	14.8

== Vote share by nomination district ==
Division	A	B	C	F	I	N	O	V
Division	%	%	%	%	%	%	%	%
Frederikshavn	22.4	2.5	6.8	6.7	2.4	7.5	35.1	16.5
Hjørring	21.9	3.4	9.1	8.0	3.2	6.9	28.5	19.0
Brønderslev	25.6	2.8	7.1	5.6	2.9	7.6	28.3	20.0
Thisted	19.4	2.9	9.1	7.3	2.3	6.1	30.2	22.7
Himmerland	16.8	4.3	10.1	7.7	2.5	6.8	29.5	22.3
Mariagerfjord	20.8	3.7	8.2	7.6	2.4	7.0	29.9	20.3
Aalborg East	24.2	6.2	6.6	10.7	3.4	10.0	25.3	13.6
Aalborg West	21.7	6.0	8.8	10.1	3.8	8.9	23.6	17.2
Aalborg North	23.1	5.4	6.9	9.3	3.8	9.8	26.3	15.4
Struer	17.3	4.3	10.1	7.8	2.1	5.2	29.4	23.8
Skive	19.3	5.8	7.1	6.6	1.9	7.4	30.1	21.8
Viborg West	19.3	4.8	7.3	9.3	2.3	6.3	25.7	25.0
Viborg East	17.3	4.6	9.0	8.0	2.3	4.8	26.6	27.2
Silkeborg North	17.0	5.2	11.1	9.3	2.8	6.3	27.9	20.3
Silkeborg South	19.0	6.9	10.9	10.9	3.2	7.7	23.9	17.7
Ikast	14.8	3.5	12.3	5.4	2.0	4.4	33.6	24.1
Herning South	15.5	4.8	10.5	6.8	2.4	5.1	29.6	25.3
Herning North	13.5	4.4	12.0	5.6	2.4	4.1	29.6	28.4
Holstebro	19.3	4.9	9.1	8.1	2.2	5.3	29.3	21.7
Ringkøbing	13.0	3.6	11.5	5.7	2.1	4.3	27.1	32.7
Aarhus South	20.4	9.2	7.6	15.4	3.6	8.6	19.0	16.2
Aarhus West	21.8	7.4	7.0	14.1	2.9	9.2	24.1	13.6
Aarhus North	21.4	9.9	6.7	17.7	3.5	10.5	17.7	12.7
Aarhus East	19.5	11.4	7.5	18.1	4.3	8.8	15.1	15.3
Djurs	18.1	4.4	6.8	10.0	2.6	8.0	31.7	18.3
Randers North	21.9	3.7	6.7	7.2	2.0	7.8	33.8	16.8
Randers South	20.3	4.1	7.2	8.0	2.9	7.3	33.1	17.3
Favrskov	20.2	5.8	8.3	9.2	2.5	5.8	27.9	20.2
Skanderborg	19.1	6.9	7.8	12.2	3.1	7.0	23.8	20.1
Horsens	20.4	4.4	7.2	7.9	3.6	7.1	31.6	17.8
Hedensted	15.2	3.5	9.1	5.9	2.8	4.6	34.0	24.9
Sønderborg	20.3	3.9	8.5	5.7	2.4	5.4	33.9	20.0
Aabenraa	16.7	3.7	8.2	5.5	2.1	5.7	34.4	23.7
Tønder	15.9	3.1	10.6	6.0	2.4	5.1	31.0	25.9
City of Esbjerg	20.6	3.8	5.8	8.8	2.8	10.4	31.1	16.6
Greater Esbjerg	17.3	3.8	8.6	8.0	2.8	6.5	28.7	24.2
Varde	13.6	3.5	8.3	5.8	2.1	4.4	32.3	30.1
Vejen	15.1	3.4	9.8	5.3	2.8	4.3	31.3	27.9
Vejle North	16.9	5.9	9.3	8.1	2.9	4.8	29.3	22.8
Vejle South	18.8	5.5	7.8	7.9	3.1	6.5	30.7	19.8
Fredericia	21.5	3.8	7.8	7.4	2.3	6.6	35.0	15.5
Kolding North	16.0	5.8	10.0	7.6	3.2	5.4	28.1	24.0
Kolding South	16.6	4.8	9.6	7.9	3.0	5.9	31.3	21.0
Haderslev	17.5	4.1	9.0	7.1	2.5	6.3	32.1	21.3
Odense East	23.0	6.9	12.7	13.4	2.2	9.7	22.9	9.2
Odense West	21.7	5.1	18.2	10.2	2.1	7.8	25.8	9.2
Odense South	20.3	7.1	18.3	11.0	2.6	6.8	21.9	12.1
Assens	21.5	3.8	17.8	7.8	1.5	6.3	26.7	14.7
Middelfart	20.8	4.2	17.1	7.2	1.8	5.7	27.9	15.3
Nyborg	21.8	3.6	15.5	7.9	1.7	7.8	28.3	13.4
Svendborg	18.1	5.0	13.6	13.6	1.8	9.7	25.7	12.5
Faaborg	19.5	4.1	17.7	8.9	1.6	7.5	25.9	14.8
Lolland	22.1	2.2	6.1	8.3	1.2	8.4	35.5	16.1
Guldborgsund	21.7	3.3	6.9	8.3	1.6	8.0	34.6	15.6
Vordingborg	19.0	4.3	7.0	10.9	2.0	9.3	31.3	16.1
Næstved	21.7	4.2	7.6	9.2	2.3	8.3	30.3	16.5
Faxe	16.4	4.6	7.9	9.1	2.3	8.1	34.4	17.3
Køge	17.5	5.4	8.3	10.4	2.8	7.6	31.5	16.6
Greve	16.7	4.8	8.8	6.6	3.4	5.4	34.2	20.0
Roskilde	19.2	8.1	8.1	13.7	2.7	8.4	24.2	15.6
Holbæk	18.3	6.3	6.9	10.1	2.4	9.2	29.0	17.7
Kalundborg	17.8	4.3	6.0	9.0	1.7	8.8	35.2	17.2
Ringsted	17.3	5.5	8.7	10.3	2.6	7.6	31.7	16.2
Slagelse	18.8	4.1	7.0	8.2	2.6	8.4	34.4	16.5
Helsingør	18.2	7.7	10.7	11.7	3.5	8.4	27.5	12.3
Fredensborg	13.4	9.0	15.5	8.8	5.5	4.8	22.6	20.4
Hillerød	16.4	6.9	8.8	11.4	3.4	7.6	27.0	18.4
Frederikssund	18.5	5.0	6.7	10.8	2.4	8.4	32.9	15.4
Egedal	17.4	9.5	10.5	11.0	4.0	6.3	24.1	17.1
Rudersdal	13.8	11.5	15.3	9.8	5.7	4.8	17.8	21.3
Gentofte	13.2	12.3	17.9	9.7	6.0	5.0	16.3	19.4
Lyngby	16.2	12.4	13.5	12.3	4.8	6.6	18.3	15.9
Gladsaxe	21.7	9.0	7.2	13.7	3.0	11.1	23.2	11.1
Rødovre	23.8	5.9	7.1	11.5	2.2	10.3	29.6	9.6
Hvidovre	22.3	5.1	6.3	11.2	2.1	9.7	34.2	9.0
Brøndby	22.1	4.6	7.8	8.8	2.4	8.9	35.3	10.1
Taastrup	20.8	4.9	9.5	11.1	1.9	10.7	31.4	9.6
Ballerup	23.0	5.6	6.8	10.0	2.3	9.0	32.1	11.1
Easterbro	19.1	14.8	7.3	20.1	4.0	11.0	13.2	10.6
Sundvester	19.0	12.8	5.6	19.7	3.8	12.2	17.7	9.3
Indre By	18.0	15.5	7.6	22.1	4.2	12.0	9.6	10.9
Sundbyøster	18.7	11.4	5.1	19.9	3.1	14.4	18.7	8.7
Nørrebro	17.4	14.2	3.6	30.0	2.6	18.2	8.5	5.5
Bispebjerg	18.5	10.8	4.9	21.5	2.7	17.3	17.7	6.6
Brønshøj	20.7	10.1	5.8	19.7	2.7	13.3	19.4	8.3
Valby	19.7	10.2	6.1	19.5	3.2	13.2	19.6	8.6
Vesterbro	18.6	14.5	4.2	26.0	3.0	15.6	11.6	6.6
Falkoner	19.0	15.1	10.9	18.1	4.3	9.0	13.0	10.8
Slots	18.2	12.2	12.2	16.2	3.9	9.3	16.4	11.5
Tårnby	18.9	5.6	8.0	9.5	2.6	8.7	35.2	11.5
Rønne	39.8	2.5	5.2	6.1	0.9	8.5	23.4	13.6
Aakirkeby	33.2	2.6	5.5	7.0	1.2	10.6	23.9	15.9

== Vote share by region ==
Division	A	B	C	F	I	N	O	V
Division	%	%	%	%	%	%	%	%
North Denmark	21.9	4.2	8.1	8.1	3.0	7.9	28.4	18.5
Central Denmark	18.7	6.1	8.4	10.4	2.9	7.0	26.4	20.1
Southern Denmark	18.9	4.6	11.9	8.3	2.3	6.7	29.0	18.2
Zealand	18.8	4.9	7.5	9.6	2.4	8.1	31.9	16.8
Capital	18.9	9.7	8.9	14.6	3.5	9.8	22.1	12.6

== Vote share by municipality ==
Division	A	B	C	F	I	N	O	V
Division	%	%	%	%	%	%	%	%
Frederikshavn	22.5	2.5	6.9	6.7	2.4	7.6	35.1	16.4
Læsø	19.2	3.3	4.9	7.7	1.6	6.4	37.4	19.5
Hjørring	21.9	3.4	9.1	8.0	3.2	6.9	28.5	19.0
Brønderslev	23.1	3.3	8.3	6.0	3.0	7.9	27.9	20.5
Jammerbugt	27.9	2.4	5.9	5.3	2.7	7.4	28.8	19.6
Thisted	19.0	3.0	9.8	7.6	2.3	6.2	29.7	22.4
Morsø	20.3	2.7	7.7	6.6	2.4	6.0	31.1	23.3
Vesthimmerland	15.5	3.1	11.5	6.6	2.1	6.3	32.2	22.6
Rebild	18.3	5.8	8.5	8.9	2.9	7.2	26.5	22.0
Mariagerfjord	20.8	3.7	8.2	7.6	2.4	7.0	29.9	20.3
Aalborg	23.1	5.9	7.4	10.1	3.6	9.6	25.1	15.3
Lemvig	15.5	4.2	9.3	7.9	2.1	4.8	29.3	26.9
Struer	19.1	4.4	10.8	7.6	2.2	5.6	29.5	20.9
Skive	19.3	5.8	7.1	6.6	1.9	7.4	30.1	21.8
Viborg	18.3	4.7	8.2	8.7	2.3	5.6	26.2	26.1
Silkeborg	18.0	6.1	11.0	10.1	3.0	7.0	25.8	19.0
Ikast-Brande	14.8	3.5	12.3	5.4	2.0	4.4	33.6	24.1
Herning	14.4	4.6	11.3	6.1	2.4	4.6	29.6	27.0
Holstebro	19.3	4.9	9.1	8.1	2.2	5.3	29.3	21.7
Ringkøbing-Skjern	13.0	3.6	11.5	5.7	2.1	4.3	27.1	32.7
Aarhus	20.7	9.6	7.2	16.4	3.6	9.3	18.8	14.5
Municipality	17.0	5.4	6.9	11.7	3.1	8.0	29.9	18.0
Municipality	19.4	3.2	6.7	7.9	2.0	8.0	34.1	18.7
Randers	21.1	3.9	6.9	7.6	2.5	7.5	33.4	17.0
Favrskov	20.2	5.8	8.3	9.2	2.5	5.8	27.9	20.2
Odder	19.3	6.5	8.4	13.5	2.3	6.8	23.1	20.2
Samsø	15.6	4.6	9.8	13.1	2.3	11.0	25.9	17.7
Skanderborg	19.2	7.2	7.4	11.6	3.5	6.8	24.0	20.2
Horsens	20.4	4.4	7.2	7.9	3.6	7.1	31.6	17.8
Hedensted	15.2	3.5	9.1	5.9	2.8	4.6	34.0	24.9
Sønderborg	20.3	3.9	8.5	5.7	2.4	5.4	33.9	20.0
Aabenraa	16.7	3.7	8.2	5.5	2.1	5.7	34.4	23.7
Tønder	15.9	3.1	10.6	6.0	2.4	5.1	31.0	25.9
Esbjerg	19.1	3.7	7.2	8.2	2.8	8.6	30.2	20.2
Fanø	17.9	6.7	4.6	15.0	1.8	10.6	24.4	18.8
Varde	13.6	3.5	8.3	5.8	2.1	4.4	32.3	30.1
Vejen	15.1	3.6	9.9	5.4	2.9	4.4	30.8	27.9
Billund	15.2	3.2	9.7	5.2	2.6	4.1	32.3	27.8
Vejle	17.9	5.7	8.5	8.0	3.0	5.7	30.0	21.3
Fredericia	21.5	3.8	7.8	7.4	2.3	6.6	35.0	15.5
Kolding	16.3	5.3	9.8	7.8	3.1	5.6	29.7	22.4
Haderslev	17.5	4.1	9.0	7.1	2.5	6.3	32.1	21.3
Odense	21.6	6.4	16.5	11.5	2.3	8.0	23.4	10.3
Assens	21.5	3.8	17.8	7.8	1.5	6.3	26.7	14.7
Middelfart	21.5	5.2	13.9	8.1	2.1	5.4	27.6	16.1
Nordfyn	20.0	2.8	21.1	6.1	1.4	6.0	28.2	14.4
Nyborg	22.3	3.5	14.7	7.7	1.7	7.5	28.0	14.5
Kerteminde	21.1	3.8	16.5	8.1	1.6	8.1	28.7	12.0
Svendborg	19.1	5.4	13.4	12.6	1.8	10.1	25.1	12.4
Langeland	13.4	3.1	14.9	18.0	1.4	8.1	28.4	12.7
Faaborg-Midtfyn	19.7	4.3	17.2	8.9	1.7	7.2	25.7	15.2
Ærø	17.5	2.9	21.5	8.4	1.3	9.5	27.3	11.7
Lolland	22.1	2.2	6.1	8.3	1.2	8.4	35.5	16.1
Guldborgsund	21.7	3.3	6.9	8.3	1.6	8.0	34.6	15.6
Vordingborg	19.0	4.3	7.0	10.9	2.0	9.3	31.3	16.1
Næstved	21.7	4.2	7.6	9.2	2.3	8.3	30.3	16.5
Faxe	16.6	4.4	8.0	9.2	2.5	8.0	34.4	16.9
Stevns	16.0	4.8	7.7	9.0	2.1	8.1	34.6	17.8
Køge	17.9	4.9	8.6	9.0	2.6	7.6	33.4	16.0
Lejre	16.7	6.5	7.7	13.1	3.1	7.5	27.7	17.7
Greve	17.1	4.6	8.3	6.2	3.2	5.4	35.7	19.6
Solrød	15.6	5.4	10.0	7.4	4.0	5.6	31.1	20.9
Roskilde	19.2	8.1	8.1	13.7	2.7	8.4	24.2	15.6
Holbæk	18.3	6.3	6.9	10.1	2.4	9.2	29.0	17.7
Kalundborg	17.6	4.0	5.7	8.5	1.7	8.3	36.2	18.1
Odsherred	18.1	4.8	6.4	9.7	1.8	9.5	33.8	15.8
Ringsted	17.7	5.5	7.9	9.5	3.0	7.4	32.0	17.0
Sorø	16.8	5.4	9.6	11.3	2.3	7.7	31.5	15.4
Slagelse	18.8	4.1	7.0	8.2	2.6	8.4	34.4	16.5
Helsingør	18.2	7.7	10.7	11.7	3.5	8.4	27.5	12.3
Fredensborg	15.6	9.1	12.1	10.7	5.0	6.1	24.3	17.1
Hørsholm	10.2	8.9	20.5	6.0	6.2	2.8	20.1	25.2
Hillerød	17.8	8.1	9.5	12.3	3.6	7.5	22.7	18.6
Gribskov	14.9	5.5	8.0	10.3	3.2	7.8	32.2	18.1
Frederikssund	17.6	5.6	6.9	10.1	2.6	7.4	32.6	17.1
Halsnæs	19.8	4.0	6.3	11.9	2.1	9.8	33.4	12.6
Egedal	16.9	7.2	9.8	9.6	3.6	5.9	29.9	17.1
Furesø	17.8	12.0	11.2	12.5	4.4	6.6	18.2	17.2
Rudersdal	13.2	11.6	15.7	9.5	6.3	4.7	16.7	22.3
Allerød	15.3	11.0	14.5	10.3	4.4	5.0	20.2	19.2
Gentofte	13.2	12.3	17.9	9.7	6.0	5.0	16.3	19.4
Lyngby-Taarbæk	16.2	12.4	13.5	12.3	4.8	6.6	18.3	15.9
Gladsaxe	21.7	9.0	7.2	13.7	3.0	11.1	23.2	11.1
Rødovre	23.9	6.3	6.5	11.7	2.1	10.4	30.3	8.9
Herlev	23.7	5.4	8.0	11.2	2.3	10.3	28.6	10.5
Hvidovre	22.3	5.1	6.3	11.2	2.1	9.7	34.2	9.0
Brøndby	23.5	4.2	5.2	9.5	2.1	10.1	36.3	9.1
Ishøj	23.3	3.9	5.4	9.2	2.2	9.0	37.6	9.4
Vallensbæk	18.1	6.2	15.4	6.7	3.4	6.6	30.9	12.7
Høje-Taastrup	19.9	5.0	12.0	8.8	2.1	7.6	33.4	11.3
Albertslund	22.3	4.9	5.1	15.2	1.8	16.2	27.9	6.7
Ballerup	24.3	6.0	6.9	10.6	2.3	9.0	30.4	10.5
Glostrup	20.1	4.8	6.8	8.6	2.4	8.8	35.9	12.6
Copenhagen	18.9	12.9	5.6	22.3	3.2	14.0	14.7	8.4
Frederiksberg	18.6	13.7	11.5	17.2	4.1	9.1	14.6	11.1
Tårnby	20.1	4.9	6.1	10.0	2.0	9.9	37.4	9.7
Dragør	16.0	7.4	13.0	8.3	4.1	5.6	29.5	16.2
Bornholm	36.5	2.6	5.4	6.5	1.1	9.5	23.6	14.8
