= Roskilde (nomination district) =

Electoral division in Denmark

- Roskilde
- Nomination district constituency for the Folketing
- Location of Roskilde within Zealand

- Location of Zealand within Denmark
- Municipalities: Roskilde
- Constituency: Zealand
- Electorate: 66,179 (2022)

Current constituency
- Created: 1849 (as constituency); 1920 (as nomination district)

Roskilde nominating district is one of the 92 nominating districts that exists for Danish elections following the 2007 municipal reform. It consists of Roskilde Municipality. It was created in 1849 as a constituency, and has been a nomination district since 1920, though its boundaries have been changed since then.

In general elections, the district tends to vote a bit more for parties commonly associated with the red bloc.

== General elections results ==
=== General elections in the 2020s ===
2022 Danish general election

Parties	Vote		
Parties	Votes	%	+ / -
Social Democrats	14,143	24.99	+1.21
Moderates	7,218	12.75	New
Green Left	7,043	12.44	+1.79
Venstre	6,924	12.23	-11.00
Liberal Alliance	4,851	8.57	+6.12
Conservatives	3,036	5.36	-2.08
Red–Green Alliance	2,861	5.05	-1.70
Social Liberals	2,631	4.65	-5.13
Denmark Democrats	2,590	4.58	New
The Alternative	1,739	3.07	+0.06
New Right	1,585	2.80	+0.79
Danish People's Party	1,460	2.58	-4.86
Independent Greens	340	0.60	New
Christian Democrats	117	0.21	-0.62
Lisa Sofia Larsson	34	0.06	New
Rasmus Paludan	30	0.05	New
Total	56,602		

=== General elections in the 2010s ===
2019 Danish general election

Parties	Vote		
Parties	Votes	%	+ / -
Social Democrats	13,225	23.78	-2.22
Venstre	12,923	23.23	+4.15
Green Left	5,924	10.65	+5.26
Social Liberals	5,441	9.78	+3.77
Danish People's Party	4,141	7.44	-11.22
Conservatives	4,136	7.44	+4.16
Red–Green Alliance	3,752	6.75	-0.90
The Alternative	1,675	3.01	-2.23
Liberal Alliance	1,360	2.45	-5.77
New Right	1,116	2.01	New
Stram Kurs	937	1.68	New
Klaus Riskær Pedersen Party	520	0.93	New
Christian Democrats	462	0.83	+0.40
Pinki Karin Yvonne Jensen	10	0.02	New
Total	55,622		

2015 Danish general election

Parties	Vote		
Parties	Votes	%	+ / -
Social Democrats	14,087	26.00	+4.64
Venstre	10,339	19.08	-6.54
Danish People's Party	10,114	18.66	+6.54
Liberal Alliance	4,456	8.22	+2.37
Red–Green Alliance	4,148	7.65	+0.81
Social Liberals	3,257	6.01	-5.75
Green Left	2,920	5.39	-5.02
The Alternative	2,838	5.24	New
Conservatives	1,780	3.28	-2.35
Christian Democrats	234	0.43	+0.05
Aamer Ahmad	13	0.02	New
Bent A. Jespersen	3	0.01	+0.01
Michael Christiansen	2	0.00	New
Total	54,191		

2011 Danish general election

Parties	Vote		
Parties	Votes	%	+ / -
Venstre	13,788	25.62	-0.45
Social Democrats	11,498	21.36	-2.06
Danish People's Party	6,523	12.12	-0.37
Social Liberals	6,327	11.76	+5.58
Green Left	5,605	10.41	-3.57
Red–Green Alliance	3,680	6.84	+4.10
Liberal Alliance	3,149	5.85	+1.97
Conservatives	3,028	5.63	-5.09
Christian Democrats	205	0.38	-0.13
Johan Isbrandt Haulik	12	0.02	New
Peter Lotinga	4	0.01	New
Bent A. Jespersen	0	0.00	New
Total	53,819		

=== General elections in the 2000s ===
2007 Danish general election

Parties	Vote		
Parties	Votes	%	+ / -
Venstre	13,637	26.07	-2.21
Social Democrats	12,249	23.42	+0.37
Green Left	7,313	13.98	+6.22
Danish People's Party	6,534	12.49	-0.17
Conservatives	5,608	10.72	+0.29
Social Liberals	3,234	6.18	-5.10
New Alliance	2,029	3.88	New
Red–Green Alliance	1,434	2.74	-1.28
Christian Democrats	268	0.51	-0.65
Total	52,306		

2005 Danish general election

Parties	Vote		
Parties	Votes	%	+ / -
Venstre	12,645	28.28	-2.96
Social Democrats	10,305	23.05	-5.24
Danish People's Party	5,659	12.66	+1.72
Social Liberals	5,046	11.28	+5.38
Conservatives	4,665	10.43	+1.75
Green Left	3,472	7.76	-0.23
Red–Green Alliance	1,796	4.02	+1.05
Christian Democrats	518	1.16	-0.60
Centre Democrats	484	1.08	-0.81
Minority Party	125	0.28	New
Total	44,715		

2001 Danish general election

Parties	Vote		
Parties	Votes	%	+ / -
Venstre	14,201	31.24	+8.90
Social Democrats	12,858	28.29	-5.42
Danish People's Party	4,974	10.94	+3.46
Conservatives	3,947	8.68	-1.56
Green Left	3,633	7.99	-2.34
Social Liberals	2,680	5.90	+1.39
Red–Green Alliance	1,352	2.97	-0.26
Centre Democrats	859	1.89	-2.89
Christian People's Party	802	1.76	-0.05
Progress Party	149	0.33	-1.00
Total	45,455		

=== General elections in the 1990s ===
1998 Danish general election

Parties	Vote		
Parties	Votes	%	+ / -
Social Democrats	14,684	33.71	+1.53
Venstre	9,732	22.34	+2.15
Green Left	4,500	10.33	+0.82
Conservatives	4,459	10.24	-7.18
Danish People's Party	3,258	7.48	New
Centre Democrats	2,082	4.78	+1.11
Social Liberals	1,964	4.51	-1.80
Red–Green Alliance	1,405	3.23	-0.86
Christian People's Party	788	1.81	+0.38
Progress Party	581	1.33	-3.83
Democratic Renewal	101	0.23	New
Total	43,554		

1994 Danish general election

Parties	Vote		
Parties	Votes	%	+ / -
Social Democrats	13,655	32.18	-3.46
Venstre	8,567	20.19	+7.58
Conservatives	7,392	17.42	-1.29
Green Left	4,035	9.51	-0.82
Social Liberals	2,679	6.31	+1.75
Progress Party	2,188	5.16	+0.79
Red–Green Alliance	1,734	4.09	+1.53
Centre Democrats	1,558	3.67	-2.70
Christian People's Party	606	1.43	-0.01
Anton Strunge	25	0.06	New
Total	42,439		

1990 Danish general election

Parties	Vote		
Parties	Votes	%	+ / -
Social Democrats	14,354	35.64	+7.95
Conservatives	7,536	18.71	-3.82
Venstre	5,080	12.61	+4.91
Green Left	4,161	10.33	-5.25
Centre Democrats	2,567	6.37	+1.14
Social Liberals	1,837	4.56	-3.55
Progress Party	1,759	4.37	-2.14
Red–Green Alliance	1,032	2.56	New
Common Course	619	1.54	-0.21
Christian People's Party	580	1.44	+0.10
The Greens	507	1.26	-0.30
Justice Party of Denmark	237	0.59	New
Humanist Party	11	0.03	New
Total	40,280		

=== General elections in the 1980s ===
1988 Danish general election

Parties	Vote		
Parties	Votes	%	+ / -
Social Democrats	11,209	27.69	+1.01
Conservatives	9,122	22.53	-0.69
Green Left	6,309	15.58	-1.43
Social Liberals	3,284	8.11	-0.22
Venstre	3,116	7.70	+1.35
Progress Party	2,636	6.51	+3.42
Centre Democrats	2,118	5.23	-0.75
Common Course	710	1.75	-0.33
The Greens	632	1.56	+0.09
Christian People's Party	541	1.34	-0.31
Left Socialists	411	1.02	-1.23
Communist Party of Denmark	399	0.99	-0.08
Total	40,487		

1987 Danish general election

Parties	Vote		
Parties	Votes	%	+ / -
Social Democrats	10,929	26.68	-3.40
Conservatives	9,513	23.22	-2.82
Green Left	6,967	17.01	+3.28
Social Liberals	3,412	8.33	+0.89
Venstre	2,600	6.35	-1.32
Centre Democrats	2,448	5.98	+1.45
Progress Party	1,266	3.09	+0.69
Left Socialists	921	2.25	-1.29
Common Course	852	2.08	New
Christian People's Party	674	1.65	-0.08
The Greens	602	1.47	New
Communist Party of Denmark	440	1.07	+0.26
Justice Party of Denmark	229	0.56	-1.27
Humanist Party	50	0.12	New
Socialist Workers Party	48	0.12	-0.04
Marxist–Leninists Party	11	0.03	-0.01
Total	40,962		

1984 Danish general election

Parties	Vote		
Parties	Votes	%	+ / -
Social Democrats	11,957	30.08	-1.98
Conservatives	10,351	26.04	+8.37
Green Left	5,460	13.73	+1.42
Venstre	3,051	7.67	+0.99
Social Liberals	2,956	7.44	-0.18
Centre Democrats	1,802	4.53	-4.20
Left Socialists	1,407	3.54	+0.28
Progress Party	954	2.40	-4.52
Justice Party of Denmark	729	1.83	+0.22
Christian People's Party	686	1.73	+0.31
Communist Party of Denmark	323	0.81	-0.61
Socialist Workers Party	63	0.16	+0.02
Marxist–Leninists Party	14	0.04	New
Total	39,753		

1981 Danish general election

Parties	Vote		
Parties	Votes	%	+ / -
Social Democrats	11,594	32.06	-6.73
Conservatives	6,391	17.67	+2.50
Green Left	4,450	12.31	+5.96
Centre Democrats	3,156	8.73	+5.46
Social Liberals	2,754	7.62	-0.47
Progress Party	2,503	6.92	-1.63
Venstre	2,417	6.68	-1.44
Left Socialists	1,180	3.26	-1.25
Justice Party of Denmark	584	1.61	-1.12
Communist Party of Denmark	515	1.42	-0.98
Christian People's Party	515	1.42	-0.16
Socialist Workers Party	52	0.14	New
Communist Workers Party	52	0.14	-0.23
Total	36,163		

=== General elections in the 1970s ===
1979 Danish general election

Parties	Vote		
Parties	Votes	%	+ / -
Social Democrats	14,202	38.79	-0.50
Conservatives	5,555	15.17	+5.35
Progress Party	3,132	8.55	-3.76
Venstre	2,972	8.12	+0.49
Social Liberals	2,963	8.09	+3.10
Green Left	2,326	6.35	+2.09
Left Socialists	1,652	4.51	+1.34
Centre Democrats	1,196	3.27	-4.43
Justice Party of Denmark	998	2.73	-1.23
Communist Party of Denmark	880	2.40	-1.49
Christian People's Party	580	1.58	-0.77
Communist Workers Party	134	0.37	New
Rasmus Byberg	23	0.06	New
Poul Rasmussen	0	0.00	New
Total	36,613		

1977 Danish general election

Parties	Vote		
Parties	Votes	%	+ / -
Social Democrats	14,023	39.29	+11.57
Progress Party	4,394	12.31	+0.31
Conservatives	3,505	9.82	+3.97
Centre Democrats	2,748	7.70	+5.34
Venstre	2,722	7.63	-12.67
Social Liberals	1,780	4.99	-6.58
Green Left	1,521	4.26	-1.94
Justice Party of Denmark	1,412	3.96	+1.75
Communist Party of Denmark	1,390	3.89	-0.66
Left Socialists	1,132	3.17	+0.42
Christian People's Party	837	2.35	-2.10
Pensioners' Party	225	0.63	New
Total	35,689		

1975 Danish general election

Parties	Vote		
Parties	Votes	%	+ / -
Social Democrats	9,637	27.72	+5.07
Venstre	7,057	20.30	+12.37
Progress Party	4,170	12.00	-1.86
Social Liberals	4,022	11.57	-4.24
Green Left	2,157	6.20	-0.70
Conservatives	2,035	5.85	-3.75
Communist Party of Denmark	1,583	4.55	+0.75
Christian People's Party	1,548	4.45	+1.62
Left Socialists	955	2.75	+0.62
Centre Democrats	821	2.36	-8.67
Justice Party of Denmark	767	2.21	-1.24
Thomas Kaxe	11	0.03	New
Johs. Feddersen	0	0.00	New
Total	34,763		

1973 Danish general election

Parties	Vote		
Parties	Votes	%	+ / -
Social Democrats	7,963	22.65	-12.65
Social Liberals	5,559	15.81	-4.37
Progress Party	4,872	13.86	New
Centre Democrats	3,877	11.03	New
Conservatives	3,376	9.60	-8.10
Venstre	2,786	7.93	-1.07
Green Left	2,427	6.90	-3.67
Communist Party of Denmark	1,334	3.80	+2.37
Justice Party of Denmark	1,212	3.45	+1.20
Christian People's Party	996	2.83	+1.29
Left Socialists	749	2.13	+0.10
Total	35,151		

1971 Danish general election

Parties	Vote		
Parties	Votes	%	+ / -
Social Democrats	11,553	35.30	+1.62
Social Liberals	6,605	20.18	-0.20
Conservatives	5,793	17.70	-4.58
Green Left	3,460	10.57	+3.13
Venstre	2,944	9.00	+0.08
Justice Party of Denmark	736	2.25	+1.70
Left Socialists	665	2.03	-1.35
Christian People's Party	504	1.54	New
Communist Party of Denmark	468	1.43	+0.31
Total	32,728		

=== General elections in the 1960s ===
1968 Danish general election

Parties	Vote		
Parties	Votes	%	+ / -
Social Democrats	20,358	33.68	-5.34
Conservatives	13,468	22.28	+2.41
Social Liberals	12,319	20.38	+9.78
Venstre	5,389	8.92	-1.66
Green Left	4,500	7.44	-6.19
Left Socialists	2,045	3.38	New
Liberal Centre	1,207	2.00	-1.87
Communist Party of Denmark	679	1.12	+0.18
Justice Party of Denmark	332	0.55	+0.04
Independent Party	125	0.21	-0.70
Thode Karlsen	19	0.03	-0.05
H. Søndersted Andersen	2	0.00	New
Kirsten Lonning	2	0.00	New
Total	60,445		

1966 Danish general election

Parties	Vote		
Parties	Votes	%	+ / -
Social Democrats	22,300	39.02	-5.19
Conservatives	11,354	19.87	-2.60
Green Left	7,792	13.63	+6.66
Social Liberals	6,061	10.60	+3.52
Venstre	6,046	10.58	-3.37
Liberal Centre	2,210	3.87	New
Communist Party of Denmark	539	0.94	-0.40
Independent Party	518	0.91	-1.17
Justice Party of Denmark	292	0.51	-0.65
Thode Karlsen	43	0.08	New
Total	57,155		

1964 Danish general election

Parties	Vote		
Parties	Votes	%	+ / -
Social Democrats	21,918	44.21	-1.31
Conservatives	11,138	22.47	+3.30
Venstre	6,916	13.95	-0.11
Social Liberals	3,508	7.08	-1.08
Green Left	3,453	6.97	-0.15
Independent Party	1,033	2.08	-0.72
Communist Party of Denmark	662	1.34	+0.28
Justice Party of Denmark	577	1.16	-0.94
Peace Politics People's Party	218	0.44	New
Danish Unity	126	0.25	New
Elin Høgsbro Appel	23	0.05	New
Total	49,572		

1960 Danish general election

Parties	Vote		
Parties	Votes	%	+ / -
Social Democrats	16,789	45.52	+3.25
Conservatives	7,072	19.17	+2.57
Venstre	5,185	14.06	-5.42
Social Liberals	3,009	8.16	-5.37
Green Left	2,626	7.12	New
Independent Party	1,033	2.80	+1.69
Justice Party of Denmark	776	2.10	-2.25
Communist Party of Denmark	392	1.06	-1.60
Total	36,882		

=== General elections in the 1950s ===
1957 Danish general election

Parties	Vote		
Parties	Votes	%	+ / -
Social Democrats	12,511	42.27	+0.56
Venstre	5,765	19.48	+4.00
Conservatives	4,914	16.60	-0.89
Social Liberals	4,005	13.53	-2.96
Justice Party of Denmark	1,286	4.35	+0.75
Communist Party of Denmark	786	2.66	-1.04
Independent Party	329	1.11	-0.41
Total	29,596		

September 1953 Danish Folketing election

Parties	Vote		
Parties	Votes	%	+ / -
Social Democrats	10,275	41.71	+2.13
Conservatives	4,307	17.49	-0.57
Social Liberals	4,063	16.49	-1.68
Venstre	3,813	15.48	+1.62
Communist Party of Denmark	912	3.70	-0.51
Justice Party of Denmark	887	3.60	-1.69
Independent Party	375	1.52	New
Total	24,632		

April 1953 Danish Folketing election

Parties	Vote		
Parties	Votes	%	+ / -
Social Democrats	9,096	39.58	-0.27
Social Liberals	4,176	18.17	+0.64
Conservatives	4,150	18.06	-0.73
Venstre	3,186	13.86	+0.75
Justice Party of Denmark	1,215	5.29	-1.64
Communist Party of Denmark	967	4.21	+0.42
Danish Unity	191	0.83	New
Total	22,981		

1950 Danish Folketing election

Parties	Vote		
Parties	Votes	%	+ / -
Social Democrats	8,564	39.85	-3.59
Conservatives	4,039	18.79	+4.58
Social Liberals	3,768	17.53	+6.68
Venstre	2,818	13.11	-7.42
Justice Party of Denmark	1,489	6.93	+3.03
Communist Party of Denmark	814	3.79	-2.36
Total	21,492		

=== General elections in the 1940s ===
1947 Danish Folketing election

Parties	Vote		
Parties	Votes	%	+ / -
Social Democrats	9,043	43.44	+8.24
Venstre	4,273	20.53	+5.36
Conservatives	2,957	14.21	-5.97
Social Liberals	2,259	10.85	-1.37
Communist Party of Denmark	1,280	6.15	-7.21
Justice Party of Denmark	812	3.90	+2.20
Danish Unity	191	0.92	-1.23
Total	20,815		

1945 Danish Folketing election

Parties	Vote		
Parties	Votes	%	+ / -
Social Democrats	7,128	35.20	-14.39
Conservatives	4,086	20.18	-3.08
Venstre	3,071	15.17	+4.53
Communist Party of Denmark	2,706	13.36	New
Social Liberals	2,475	12.22	+0.95
Danish Unity	436	2.15	+0.71
Justice Party of Denmark	344	1.70	+0.16
Edward Hjalmar Larsen	4	0.02	New
Total	20,250		

1943 Danish Folketing election

Parties	Vote		
Parties	Votes	%	+ / -
Social Democrats	9,686	49.59	+1.47
Conservatives	4,544	23.26	+2.05
Social Liberals	2,201	11.27	-0.01
Venstre	2,079	10.64	-0.71
National Socialist Workers' Party of Denmark	435	2.23	+0.17
Justice Party of Denmark	300	1.54	-0.32
Danish Unity	282	1.44	+1.20
Chr. Orla Nielsen	7	0.04	New
Total	19,534		

=== General elections in the 1930s ===
1939 Danish Folketing election

Parties	Vote		
Parties	Votes	%	+ / -
Social Democrats	7,877	48.12	-4.99
Conservatives	3,472	21.21	-0.11
Venstre	1,858	11.35	+1.27
Social Liberals	1,847	11.28	+1.04
Communist Party of Denmark	431	2.63	+1.22
National Socialist Workers' Party of Denmark	337	2.06	+1.40
Justice Party of Denmark	305	1.86	-0.46
National Cooperation	107	0.65	New
Farmers' Party	97	0.59	-0.28
Danish Unity	39	0.24	New
Total	16,370		

1935 Danish Folketing election

Parties	Vote		
Parties	Votes	%	+ / -
Social Democrats	8,347	53.11	+2.75
Conservatives	3,350	21.32	+0.86
Social Liberals	1,609	10.24	+0.48
Venstre	1,584	10.08	-5.87
Justice Party of Denmark	364	2.32	-0.27
Communist Party of Denmark	222	1.41	+0.57
Independent People's Party	136	0.87	New
National Socialist Workers' Party of Denmark	103	0.66	New
Total	15,715		

1932 Danish Folketing election

Parties	Vote		
Parties	Votes	%	+ / -
Social Democrats	7,322	50.36	+1.49
Conservatives	2,975	20.46	+1.50
Venstre	2,319	15.95	-3.26
Social Liberals	1,419	9.76	-0.58
Justice Party of Denmark	377	2.59	+0.09
Communist Party of Denmark	122	0.84	+0.72
W. Colding	4	0.03	New
Christian Sørensen	0	0.00	New
Total	14,538		

=== General elections in the 1920s ===
1929 Danish Folketing election

Parties	Vote		
Parties	Votes	%	+ / -
Social Democrats	6,408	48.87	+5.92
Venstre	2,519	19.21	+1.07
Conservatives	2,486	18.96	-5.56
Social Liberals	1,356	10.34	-2.06
Justice Party of Denmark	328	2.50	+0.75
Communist Party of Denmark	16	0.12	-0.12
Total	13,113		

1926 Danish Folketing election

Parties	Vote		
Parties	Votes	%	+ / -
Social Democrats	5,267	42.95	+3.26
Conservatives	3,007	24.52	-0.60
Venstre	2,225	18.14	+2.02
Social Liberals	1,520	12.40	-3.91
Justice Party of Denmark	214	1.75	+0.18
Communist Party of Denmark	30	0.24	+0.03
Total	12,263		

1924 Danish Folketing election

Parties	Vote		
Parties	Votes	%	+ / -
Social Democrats	4,727	39.69	+3.25
Conservatives	2,992	25.12	-1.10
Social Liberals	1,942	16.31	+1.05
Venstre	1,920	16.12	-3.78
Justice Party of Denmark	187	1.57	New
Farmer Party	117	0.98	New
Communist Party of Denmark	25	0.21	New
Total	11,910		

September 1920 Danish Folketing election

Parties	Vote		
Parties	Votes	%	+ / -
Social Democrats	3,986	36.44	+4.31
Conservatives	2,868	26.22	-1.30
Venstre	2,177	19.90	-2.47
Social Liberals	1,669	15.26	+0.52
Industry Party	198	1.81	-1.04
Danish Left Socialist Party	40	0.37	New
Total	10,938		

July 1920 Danish Folketing election

Parties	Vote		
Parties	Votes	%	+ / -
Social Democrats	2,893	32.13	+0.38
Conservatives	2,478	27.52	+1.38
Venstre	2,014	22.37	+0.36
Social Liberals	1,327	14.74	-0.91
Industry Party	257	2.85	-0.92
A. Sterregaard	35	0.39	New
Total	9,004		

April 1920 Danish Folketing election

Parties	Vote	
Parties	Votes	%
Social Democrats	3,047	31.75
Conservatives	2,509	26.14
Venstre	2,112	22.01
Social Liberals	1,502	15.65
Industry Party	362	3.77
Daniel Nielsen	43	0.45
Centrum	22	0.23
Total	9,597	

== European Parliament elections results ==
2024 European Parliament election in Denmark

Parties	Vote		
Parties	Votes	%	+ / -
Green Left	8,534	20.23	+5.40
Social Democrats	6,160	14.60	-6.47
Venstre	5,974	14.16	-7.34
Conservatives	3,863	9.16	+2.40
Social Liberals	3,655	8.66	-3.21
Moderates	3,128	7.41	New
Liberal Alliance	3,077	7.29	+5.40
Red–Green Alliance	2,926	6.93	+1.37
Danish People's Party	2,317	5.49	-3.90
Denmark Democrats	1,520	3.60	New
The Alternative	1,041	2.47	-1.11
Total	42,195		

2019 European Parliament election in Denmark

Parties	Vote		
Parties	Votes	%	+ / -
Venstre	9,682	21.50	+5.90
Social Democrats	9,489	21.07	+1.86
Green Left	6,679	14.83	+1.15
Social Liberals	5,344	11.87	+3.75
Danish People's Party	4,227	9.39	-14.78
Conservatives	3,043	6.76	-1.37
Red–Green Alliance	2,505	5.56	New
The Alternative	1,611	3.58	New
People's Movement against the EU	1,605	3.56	-4.79
Liberal Alliance	853	1.89	-0.84
Total	45,038		

2014 European Parliament election in Denmark

Parties	Vote		
Parties	Votes	%	+ / -
Danish People's Party	8,944	24.17	+9.62
Social Democrats	7,110	19.21	-1.28
Venstre	5,773	15.60	-2.89
Green Left	5,061	13.68	-4.43
People's Movement against the EU	3,090	8.35	+0.36
Conservatives	3,010	8.13	-4.14
Social Liberals	3,006	8.12	+3.07
Liberal Alliance	1,009	2.73	+2.11
Total	37,003		

2009 European Parliament election in Denmark

Parties	Vote		
Parties	Votes	%	+ / -
Social Democrats	7,638	20.49	-11.66
Venstre	6,890	18.49	+3.68
Green Left	6,749	18.11	+8.54
Danish People's Party	5,423	14.55	+7.81
Conservatives	4,575	12.27	-2.10
People's Movement against the EU	2,979	7.99	+2.21
Social Liberals	1,882	5.05	-1.92
June Movement	905	2.43	-6.36
Liberal Alliance	230	0.62	New
Total	37,271		

2004 European Parliament election in Denmark

Parties	Vote		
Parties	Votes	%	+ / -
Social Democrats	8,830	32.15	+17.49
Venstre	4,068	14.81	-5.57
Conservatives	3,947	14.37	+5.49
Green Left	2,629	9.57	-0.69
June Movement	2,415	8.79	-7.04
Social Liberals	1,913	6.97	-4.42
Danish People's Party	1,851	6.74	+0.94
People's Movement against the EU	1,587	5.78	-1.62
Christian Democrats	225	0.82	-0.72
Total	27,465		

1999 European Parliament election in Denmark

Parties	Vote		
Parties	Votes	%	+ / -
Venstre	5,543	20.38	+6.28
June Movement	4,306	15.83	-0.63
Social Democrats	3,988	14.66	+0.72
Social Liberals	3,097	11.39	-1.12
Green Left	2,791	10.26	-0.65
Conservatives	2,416	8.88	-9.91
People's Movement against the EU	2,013	7.40	-2.12
Danish People's Party	1,576	5.80	New
Centre Democrats	1,044	3.84	+3.02
Christian Democrats	420	1.54	+0.81
Progress Party	95	0.35	-1.87
Total	27,194		

1994 European Parliament election in Denmark

Parties	Vote		
Parties	Votes	%	+ / -
Conservatives	5,231	18.79	+4.01
June Movement	4,582	16.46	New
Venstre	3,925	14.10	+1.90
Social Democrats	3,879	13.94	-7.93
Social Liberals	3,483	12.51	+9.02
Green Left	3,037	10.91	+0.24
People's Movement against the EU	2,650	9.52	-13.14
Progress Party	618	2.22	-1.54
Centre Democrats	228	0.82	-7.99
Christian Democrats	203	0.73	-1.04
Total	27,836		

1989 European Parliament election in Denmark

Parties	Vote		
Parties	Votes	%	+ / -
People's Movement against the EU	5,198	22.66	-1.58
Social Democrats	5,018	21.87	+3.72
Conservatives	3,392	14.78	-8.57
Venstre	2,798	12.20	+5.28
Green Left	2,448	10.67	+0.49
Centre Democrats	2,022	8.81	+2.61
Progress Party	862	3.76	+0.96
Social Liberals	800	3.49	-0.81
Christian Democrats	405	1.77	-0.02
Total	22,943		

1984 European Parliament election in Denmark

Parties	Vote	
Parties	Votes	%
People's Movement against the EU	5,914	24.24
Conservatives	5,696	23.35
Social Democrats	4,427	18.15
Green Left	2,483	10.18
Venstre	1,687	6.92
Centre Democrats	1,512	6.20
Social Liberals	1,050	4.30
Progress Party	682	2.80
Left Socialists	505	2.07
Christian Democrats	437	1.79
Total	24,393	

== Referendums ==
2022 Danish European Union opt-out referendum

Option	Votes	%
✓ YES	32,809	71.99
X NO	12,767	28.01

2015 Danish European Union opt-out referendum

Option	Votes	%
✓ YES	23,885	51.88
X NO	22,157	48.12

2014 Danish Unified Patent Court membership referendum

Option	Votes	%
✓ YES	23,615	65.32
X NO	12,537	34.68

2009 Danish Act of Succession referendum

Option	Votes	%
✓ YES	28,901	85.60
X NO	4,861	14.40

2000 Danish euro referendum

Option	Votes	%
X NO	22,804	50.59
✓ YES	22,270	49.41

1998 Danish Amsterdam Treaty referendum

Option	Votes	%
✓ YES	22,134	56.21
X NO	17,243	43.79

1993 Danish Maastricht Treaty referendum

Option	Votes	%
✓ YES	24,964	57.58
X NO	18,389	42.42

1992 Danish Maastricht Treaty referendum

Option	Votes	%
X NO	21,181	50.33
✓ YES	20,901	49.67

1986 Danish Single European Act referendum

Option	Votes	%
✓ YES	18,647	53.38
X NO	16,284	46.62

1972 Danish European Communities membership referendum

Option	Votes	%
✓ YES	22,166	62.58
X NO	13,257	37.42

1953 Danish constitutional and electoral age referendum

Option	Votes	%
✓ YES	14,840	81.44
X NO	3,382	18.56
23 years	10,377	54.46
21 years	8,679	45.54

1939 Danish constitutional referendum

Option	Votes	%
✓ YES	10,702	91.93
X NO	939	8.07
