= Slagelse (nomination district) =

Danish nominating district

- Slagelse
- Nomination district constituency for the Folketing
- Location of Slagelse within Zealand

- Location of Zealand within Denmark
- Municipalities: Slagelse
- Constituency: Zealand
- Electorate: 60,183 (2022)

Current constituency
- Created: 1849 (as constituency); 1920 (as nomination district)

Slagelse nominating district is one of the 92 nominating districts that exists for Danish elections following the 2007 municipal reform. It consists of Slagelse Municipality. It was created in 1849 as a constituency, and has been a nomination district since 1920, though its boundaries have been changed since then.

In general elections, the district tends to vote a bit more for parties commonly associated with the blue bloc.

== General elections results ==
=== General elections in the 2020s ===
2022 Danish general election

Parties	Vote		
Parties	Votes	%	+ / -
Social Democrats	15,038	31.89	+3.88
Venstre	6,984	14.81	-11.04
Moderates	4,653	9.87	New
Denmark Democrats	4,354	9.23	New
Green Left	3,770	8.00	+0.13
Liberal Alliance	2,975	6.31	+4.76
New Right	2,331	4.94	+1.92
Danish People's Party	1,834	3.89	-7.62
Conservatives	1,777	3.77	-1.11
Red–Green Alliance	1,344	2.85	-2.16
Social Liberals	850	1.80	-3.66
The Alternative	662	1.40	-0.39
Independent Greens	382	0.81	New
Christian Democrats	109	0.23	-0.50
Rasmus Paludan	47	0.10	New
Lisa Sofia Larsson	41	0.09	New
Total	47,151		

=== General elections in the 2010s ===
2019 Danish general election

Parties	Vote		
Parties	Votes	%	+ / -
Social Democrats	13,478	28.01	+0.62
Venstre	12,438	25.85	+6.55
Danish People's Party	5,540	11.51	-16.67
Green Left	3,788	7.87	+4.63
Social Liberals	2,626	5.46	+2.49
Red–Green Alliance	2,410	5.01	-1.74
Conservatives	2,349	4.88	+2.49
Stram Kurs	1,608	3.34	New
New Right	1,455	3.02	New
The Alternative	859	1.79	-1.25
Liberal Alliance	745	1.55	-4.78
Klaus Riskær Pedersen Party	458	0.95	New
Christian Democrats	349	0.73	+0.35
Pinki Karin Yvonne Jensen	15	0.03	New
Total	48,118		

2015 Danish general election

Parties	Vote		
Parties	Votes	%	+ / -
Danish People's Party	13,577	28.18	+9.85
Social Democrats	13,197	27.39	+1.74
Venstre	9,298	19.30	-6.34
Red–Green Alliance	3,253	6.75	+1.31
Liberal Alliance	3,052	6.33	+1.77
Green Left	1,562	3.24	-6.46
The Alternative	1,464	3.04	New
Social Liberals	1,432	2.97	-3.13
Conservatives	1,151	2.39	-1.67
Christian Democrats	182	0.38	+0.03
Aamer Ahmad	13	0.03	New
Michael Christiansen	3	0.01	New
Bent A. Jespersen	3	0.01	0.00
Total	48,187		

2011 Danish general election

Parties	Vote		
Parties	Votes	%	+ / -
Social Democrats	12,645	25.65	-0.37
Venstre	12,642	25.64	-1.83
Danish People's Party	9,038	18.33	-1.56
Green Left	4,780	9.70	-2.32
Social Liberals	3,009	6.10	+3.21
Red–Green Alliance	2,681	5.44	+4.09
Liberal Alliance	2,246	4.56	+2.16
Conservatives	1,999	4.06	-3.53
Christian Democrats	171	0.35	-0.02
Peter Lotinga	72	0.15	New
Johan Isbrandt Haulik	9	0.02	New
Bent A. Jespersen	5	0.01	New
Total	49,297		

=== General elections in the 2000s ===
2007 Danish general election

Parties	Vote		
Parties	Votes	%	+ / -
Venstre	13,335	27.47	-1.70
Social Democrats	12,633	26.02	-2.33
Danish People's Party	9,654	19.89	+1.95
Green Left	5,834	12.02	+5.76
Conservatives	3,682	7.59	-0.46
Social Liberals	1,402	2.89	-2.92
New Alliance	1,166	2.40	New
Red–Green Alliance	654	1.35	-0.98
Christian Democrats	182	0.37	-0.58
Total	48,542		

2005 Danish general election

Parties	Vote		
Parties	Votes	%	+ / -
Venstre	10,118	29.17	+1.15
Social Democrats	9,836	28.35	-2.65
Danish People's Party	6,225	17.94	+1.03
Conservatives	2,794	8.05	-1.33
Green Left	2,173	6.26	-0.23
Social Liberals	2,014	5.81	+2.51
Red–Green Alliance	810	2.33	+0.84
Christian Democrats	328	0.95	-0.25
Centre Democrats	313	0.90	-0.43
Minority Party	73	0.21	New
Bent A. Jespersen	6	0.02	New
Total	34,690		

2001 Danish general election

Parties	Vote		
Parties	Votes	%	+ / -
Social Democrats	11,153	31.00	-10.27
Venstre	10,081	28.02	+9.68
Danish People's Party	6,083	16.91	+7.21
Conservatives	3,374	9.38	-2.78
Green Left	2,334	6.49	-0.44
Social Liberals	1,188	3.30	+1.00
Red–Green Alliance	537	1.49	-0.34
Centre Democrats	479	1.33	-2.56
Christian People's Party	430	1.20	-0.63
Progress Party	194	0.54	-0.93
Mark Hulstrøm	125	0.35	New
Total	35,978		

=== General elections in the 1990s ===
1998 Danish general election

Parties	Vote		
Parties	Votes	%	+ / -
Social Democrats	14,529	41.27	+0.69
Venstre	6,457	18.34	+1.43
Conservatives	4,280	12.16	-7.49
Danish People's Party	3,414	9.70	New
Green Left	2,440	6.93	-0.45
Centre Democrats	1,368	3.89	+1.35
Social Liberals	808	2.30	-1.03
Christian People's Party	645	1.83	+0.81
Red–Green Alliance	645	1.83	-0.62
Progress Party	518	1.47	-4.60
Democratic Renewal	92	0.26	New
Bent A. Jespersen	9	0.03	New
Total	35,205		

1994 Danish general election

Parties	Vote		
Parties	Votes	%	+ / -
Social Democrats	13,972	40.58	-3.50
Conservatives	6,765	19.65	+1.76
Venstre	5,822	16.91	+6.44
Green Left	2,542	7.38	-0.78
Progress Party	2,090	6.07	-0.14
Social Liberals	1,148	3.33	+0.92
Centre Democrats	876	2.54	-2.33
Red–Green Alliance	842	2.45	+1.31
Christian People's Party	352	1.02	+0.02
Grethe Lindberg	15	0.04	New
Henning Moth	6	0.02	New
Total	34,430		

1990 Danish general election

Parties	Vote		
Parties	Votes	%	+ / -
Social Democrats	14,779	44.08	+8.93
Conservatives	5,997	17.89	-1.92
Venstre	3,509	10.47	+3.06
Green Left	2,734	8.16	-5.66
Progress Party	2,083	6.21	-2.74
Centre Democrats	1,631	4.87	+0.66
Common Course	815	2.43	-0.26
Social Liberals	808	2.41	-1.86
Red–Green Alliance	381	1.14	New
Christian People's Party	334	1.00	-0.11
The Greens	286	0.85	-0.45
Justice Party of Denmark	158	0.47	New
Humanist Party	9	0.03	New
Total	33,524		

=== General elections in the 1980s ===
1988 Danish general election

Parties	Vote		
Parties	Votes	%	+ / -
Social Democrats	12,148	35.15	-0.76
Conservatives	6,847	19.81	-0.86
Green Left	4,776	13.82	-1.49
Progress Party	3,094	8.95	+4.38
Venstre	2,560	7.41	+0.75
Social Liberals	1,475	4.27	-0.50
Centre Democrats	1,454	4.21	+0.08
Common Course	928	2.69	-0.15
The Greens	451	1.30	+0.02
Christian People's Party	383	1.11	-0.19
Communist Party of Denmark	323	0.93	-0.03
Left Socialists	115	0.33	-0.35
Søren Barder	7	0.02	New
Total	34,561		

1987 Danish general election

Parties	Vote		
Parties	Votes	%	+ / -
Social Democrats	12,634	35.91	-2.32
Conservatives	7,274	20.67	-2.77
Green Left	5,387	15.31	+2.85
Venstre	2,343	6.66	-1.94
Social Liberals	1,679	4.77	+0.60
Progress Party	1,609	4.57	+1.31
Centre Democrats	1,454	4.13	-0.06
Common Course	998	2.84	New
Christian People's Party	459	1.30	-0.40
The Greens	451	1.28	New
Communist Party of Denmark	337	0.96	+0.16
Left Socialists	240	0.68	-0.90
Justice Party of Denmark	203	0.58	-0.88
Humanist Party	76	0.22	New
Socialist Workers Party	31	0.09	+0.04
Marxist–Leninists Party	9	0.03	-0.01
Total	35,184		

1984 Danish general election

Parties	Vote		
Parties	Votes	%	+ / -
Social Democrats	13,399	38.23	-2.79
Conservatives	8,215	23.44	+9.08
Green Left	4,366	12.46	+0.98
Venstre	3,013	8.60	+1.30
Centre Democrats	1,470	4.19	-3.98
Social Liberals	1,463	4.17	+0.50
Progress Party	1,142	3.26	-5.06
Christian People's Party	596	1.70	+0.56
Left Socialists	555	1.58	+0.23
Justice Party of Denmark	511	1.46	+0.15
Communist Party of Denmark	280	0.80	-0.91
Socialist Workers Party	16	0.05	0.00
Marxist–Leninists Party	14	0.04	New
Bent E. Jespersen	10	0.03	New
Total	35,050		

1981 Danish general election

Parties	Vote		
Parties	Votes	%	+ / -
Social Democrats	13,033	41.02	-4.70
Conservatives	4,564	14.36	+1.46
Green Left	3,649	11.48	+5.04
Progress Party	2,645	8.32	-1.27
Centre Democrats	2,596	8.17	+5.04
Venstre	2,321	7.30	-2.20
Social Liberals	1,167	3.67	+0.02
Communist Party of Denmark	544	1.71	-0.66
Left Socialists	428	1.35	-0.92
Justice Party of Denmark	417	1.31	-1.31
Christian People's Party	361	1.14	-0.33
Communist Workers Party	28	0.09	-0.24
Socialist Workers Party	15	0.05	New
Kai Linde	5	0.02	New
Total	31,773		

=== General elections in the 1970s ===
1979 Danish general election

Parties	Vote		
Parties	Votes	%	+ / -
Social Democrats	15,015	45.72	+2.11
Conservatives	4,235	12.90	+4.32
Progress Party	3,149	9.59	-3.98
Venstre	3,121	9.50	+0.35
Green Left	2,115	6.44	+2.48
Social Liberals	1,199	3.65	+1.10
Centre Democrats	1,027	3.13	-2.83
Justice Party of Denmark	860	2.62	-0.62
Communist Party of Denmark	779	2.37	-2.22
Left Socialists	745	2.27	+0.68
Christian People's Party	484	1.47	-0.61
Communist Workers Party	110	0.33	New
Total	32,839		

1977 Danish general election

Parties	Vote		
Parties	Votes	%	+ / -
Social Democrats	14,105	43.61	+6.03
Progress Party	4,389	13.57	+1.25
Venstre	2,960	9.15	-10.65
Conservatives	2,774	8.58	+3.27
Centre Democrats	1,926	5.96	+3.73
Communist Party of Denmark	1,485	4.59	-0.59
Green Left	1,280	3.96	-1.41
Justice Party of Denmark	1,048	3.24	+1.75
Social Liberals	826	2.55	-3.19
Christian People's Party	674	2.08	-1.86
Left Socialists	513	1.59	+0.56
Pensioners' Party	361	1.12	New
Total	32,341		

1975 Danish general election

Parties	Vote		
Parties	Votes	%	+ / -
Social Democrats	11,866	37.58	+5.76
Venstre	6,254	19.80	+10.47
Progress Party	3,889	12.32	-3.07
Social Liberals	1,812	5.74	-4.02
Green Left	1,697	5.37	-0.96
Conservatives	1,678	5.31	-3.93
Communist Party of Denmark	1,636	5.18	+1.51
Christian People's Party	1,243	3.94	+1.43
Centre Democrats	704	2.23	-6.29
Justice Party of Denmark	472	1.49	-0.98
Left Socialists	324	1.03	+0.09
N. Vestergård Eriksen	2	0.01	New
Egon Larsen	1	0.00	New
Total	31,578		

1973 Danish general election

Parties	Vote		
Parties	Votes	%	+ / -
Social Democrats	10,087	31.82	+4.80
Progress Party	4,880	15.39	New
Social Liberals	3,095	9.76	-4.01
Venstre	2,958	9.33	-6.36
Conservatives	2,928	9.24	-17.63
Centre Democrats	2,702	8.52	New
Green Left	2,007	6.33	-4.08
Communist Party of Denmark	1,164	3.67	+1.80
Christian People's Party	795	2.51	+1.18
Justice Party of Denmark	784	2.47	+0.71
Left Socialists	299	0.94	-0.34
Total	31,699		

1971 Danish general election

Parties	Vote		
Parties	Votes	%	+ / -
Social Democrats	6,802	27.02	-16.94
Conservatives	6,764	26.87	+7.48
Venstre	3,948	15.69	+0.19
Social Liberals	3,466	13.77	+3.48
Green Left	2,620	10.41	+4.20
Communist Party of Denmark	471	1.87	+0.70
Justice Party of Denmark	442	1.76	+1.10
Christian People's Party	335	1.33	New
Left Socialists	322	1.28	-0.21
Total	25,170		

=== General elections in the 1960s ===
1968 Danish general election

Parties	Vote		
Parties	Votes	%	+ / -
Social Democrats	12,246	43.96	-4.46
Conservatives	5,402	19.39	+3.27
Venstre	4,319	15.50	-0.64
Social Liberals	2,866	10.29	+5.55
Green Left	1,731	6.21	-3.79
Left Socialists	415	1.49	New
Communist Party of Denmark	326	1.17	+0.18
Liberal Centre	279	1.00	-0.96
Justice Party of Denmark	183	0.66	+0.03
Independent Party	89	0.32	-0.67
Total	27,856		

1966 Danish general election

Parties	Vote		
Parties	Votes	%	+ / -
Social Democrats	13,190	48.42	-4.02
Venstre	4,398	16.14	-1.51
Conservatives	4,391	16.12	-1.67
Green Left	2,723	10.00	+5.45
Social Liberals	1,292	4.74	+2.00
Liberal Centre	534	1.96	New
Communist Party of Denmark	271	0.99	-0.41
Independent Party	270	0.99	-0.69
Justice Party of Denmark	172	0.63	-0.42
Total	27,241		

1964 Danish general election

Parties	Vote		
Parties	Votes	%	+ / -
Social Democrats	13,349	52.44	+1.19
Conservatives	4,529	17.79	-0.14
Venstre	4,494	17.65	-0.04
Green Left	1,158	4.55	-0.82
Social Liberals	697	2.74	-0.33
Independent Party	428	1.68	+0.29
Communist Party of Denmark	356	1.40	-0.08
Justice Party of Denmark	267	1.05	-0.77
Danish Unity	104	0.41	New
Peace Politics People's Party	75	0.29	New
Total	25,457		

1960 Danish general election

Parties	Vote		
Parties	Votes	%	+ / -
Social Democrats	11,999	51.25	+2.05
Conservatives	4,197	17.93	+3.19
Venstre	4,141	17.69	-6.38
Green Left	1,257	5.37	New
Social Liberals	719	3.07	-1.42
Justice Party of Denmark	425	1.82	-2.09
Communist Party of Denmark	347	1.48	-1.31
Independent Party	326	1.39	+0.60
Total	23,411		

=== General elections in the 1950s ===
1957 Danish general election

Parties	Vote		
Parties	Votes	%	+ / -
Social Democrats	10,960	49.20	-1.53
Venstre	5,362	24.07	+3.11
Conservatives	3,284	14.74	-1.29
Social Liberals	1,001	4.49	+0.44
Justice Party of Denmark	872	3.91	+0.87
Communist Party of Denmark	622	2.79	-1.50
Independent Party	177	0.79	-0.11
Total	22,278		

September 1953 Danish Folketing election

Parties	Vote		
Parties	Votes	%	+ / -
Social Democrats	10,711	50.73	+1.21
Venstre	4,425	20.96	+2.39
Conservatives	3,385	16.03	-0.66
Communist Party of Denmark	906	4.29	-0.46
Social Liberals	855	4.05	-0.72
Justice Party of Denmark	642	3.04	-2.06
Independent Party	191	0.90	New
Total	21,115		

April 1953 Danish Folketing election

Parties	Vote		
Parties	Votes	%	+ / -
Social Democrats	10,029	49.52	+1.06
Venstre	3,761	18.57	+1.27
Conservatives	3,381	16.69	-1.12
Justice Party of Denmark	1,032	5.10	-2.26
Social Liberals	966	4.77	+0.37
Communist Party of Denmark	962	4.75	+0.08
Danish Unity	122	0.60	New
Total	20,253		

1950 Danish Folketing election

Parties	Vote		
Parties	Votes	%	+ / -
Social Democrats	9,661	48.46	-0.18
Conservatives	3,550	17.81	+5.37
Venstre	3,448	17.30	-6.03
Justice Party of Denmark	1,467	7.36	+3.30
Communist Party of Denmark	931	4.67	-2.73
Social Liberals	877	4.40	+1.03
Total	19,934		

=== General elections in the 1940s ===
1947 Danish Folketing election

Parties	Vote		
Parties	Votes	%	+ / -
Social Democrats	9,661	48.64	+8.70
Venstre	4,634	23.33	+3.80
Conservatives	2,471	12.44	-6.52
Communist Party of Denmark	1,469	7.40	-6.49
Justice Party of Denmark	807	4.06	+1.79
Social Liberals	670	3.37	-0.56
Danish Unity	151	0.76	-0.71
Total	19,863		

1945 Danish Folketing election

Parties	Vote		
Parties	Votes	%	+ / -
Social Democrats	7,754	39.94	-15.93
Venstre	3,792	19.53	+4.35
Conservatives	3,681	18.96	-1.58
Communist Party of Denmark	2,697	13.89	New
Social Liberals	762	3.93	+0.15
Justice Party of Denmark	441	2.27	+0.79
Danish Unity	285	1.47	+0.55
Total	19,412		

1943 Danish Folketing election

Parties	Vote		
Parties	Votes	%	+ / -
Social Democrats	10,735	55.87	+2.22
Conservatives	3,946	20.54	+3.45
Venstre	2,917	15.18	-1.64
Social Liberals	727	3.78	-0.57
National Socialist Workers' Party of Denmark	400	2.08	+0.42
Justice Party of Denmark	285	1.48	-0.04
Danish Unity	177	0.92	+0.47
Farmers' Party	28	0.15	-0.04
Total	19,215		

=== General elections in the 1930s ===
1939 Danish Folketing election

Parties	Vote		
Parties	Votes	%	+ / -
Social Democrats	8,880	53.65	-3.50
Conservatives	2,829	17.09	-1.14
Venstre	2,784	16.82	+1.57
Social Liberals	720	4.35	+0.03
Communist Party of Denmark	495	2.99	+1.14
National Socialist Workers' Party of Denmark	274	1.66	+0.58
Justice Party of Denmark	251	1.52	-0.35
National Cooperation	211	1.27	New
Danish Unity	75	0.45	New
Farmers' Party	32	0.19	-0.05
Total	16,551		

1935 Danish Folketing election

Parties	Vote		
Parties	Votes	%	+ / -
Social Democrats	9,087	57.15	+2.75
Conservatives	2,899	18.23	-0.07
Venstre	2,425	15.25	-3.49
Social Liberals	687	4.32	+0.09
Justice Party of Denmark	298	1.87	-1.22
Communist Party of Denmark	294	1.85	+0.82
National Socialist Workers' Party of Denmark	171	1.08	New
Independent People's Party	38	0.24	New
Total	15,899		

1932 Danish Folketing election

Parties	Vote		
Parties	Votes	%	+ / -
Social Democrats	8,145	54.40	-0.10
Venstre	2,806	18.74	-3.37
Conservatives	2,740	18.30	+1.32
Social Liberals	633	4.23	-0.84
Justice Party of Denmark	462	3.09	+1.75
Communist Party of Denmark	154	1.03	New
Parcelist J. P. Jensen	33	0.22	New
Total	14,973		

=== General elections in the 1920s ===
1929 Danish Folketing election

Parties	Vote		
Parties	Votes	%	+ / -
Social Democrats	7,788	54.50	+4.01
Venstre	3,159	22.11	-0.31
Conservatives	2,427	16.98	-3.67
Social Liberals	725	5.07	-0.55
Justice Party of Denmark	191	1.34	+0.52
Total	14,290		

1926 Danish Folketing election

Parties	Vote		
Parties	Votes	%	+ / -
Social Democrats	6,954	50.49	+1.62
Venstre	3,088	22.42	-1.34
Conservatives	2,844	20.65	+0.81
Social Liberals	774	5.62	-0.74
Justice Party of Denmark	113	0.82	+0.16
Total	13,773		

1924 Danish Folketing election

Parties	Vote		
Parties	Votes	%	+ / -
Social Democrats	6,480	48.87	+1.84
Venstre	3,150	23.76	-2.35
Conservatives	2,631	19.84	+0.49
Social Liberals	843	6.36	+1.41
Justice Party of Denmark	87	0.66	New
Farmer Party	68	0.51	New
Total	13,259		

September 1920 Danish Folketing election

Parties	Vote		
Parties	Votes	%	+ / -
Social Democrats	5,958	47.03	+4.23
Venstre	3,307	26.11	-3.25
Conservatives	2,451	19.35	-1.56
Social Liberals	627	4.95	+0.33
Industry Party	258	2.04	-0.27
Danish Left Socialist Party	67	0.53	New
Total	12,668		

July 1920 Danish Folketing election

Parties	Vote		
Parties	Votes	%	+ / -
Social Democrats	4,417	42.80	+0.63
Venstre	3,030	29.36	+1.32
Conservatives	2,158	20.91	-1.37
Social Liberals	477	4.62	-0.63
Industry Party	238	2.31	+0.58
Total	10,320		

April 1920 Danish Folketing election

Parties	Vote	
Parties	Votes	%
Social Democrats	4,693	42.17
Venstre	3,120	28.04
Conservatives	2,479	22.28
Social Liberals	584	5.25
Industry Party	192	1.73
Carl Christensen	60	0.54
Total	11,128	

== European Parliament elections results ==
2024 European Parliament election in Denmark

Parties	Vote		
Parties	Votes	%	+ / -
Social Democrats	5,519	19.12	-4.87
Venstre	4,685	16.23	-7.30
Green Left	3,900	13.51	+2.49
Danish People's Party	2,871	9.94	-5.82
Denmark Democrats	2,498	8.65	New
Conservatives	2,392	8.28	+3.49
Moderates	1,944	6.73	New
Liberal Alliance	1,914	6.63	+4.67
Red–Green Alliance	1,364	4.72	-0.43
Social Liberals	1,213	4.20	-2.67
The Alternative	572	1.98	-0.35
Total	28,872		

2019 European Parliament election in Denmark

Parties	Vote		
Parties	Votes	%	+ / -
Social Democrats	8,466	23.99	+5.14
Venstre	8,304	23.53	+6.99
Danish People's Party	5,562	15.76	-18.65
Green Left	3,888	11.02	+2.83
Social Liberals	2,426	6.87	+2.82
Red–Green Alliance	1,818	5.15	New
Conservatives	1,689	4.79	-2.22
People's Movement against the EU	1,628	4.61	-3.76
The Alternative	822	2.33	New
Liberal Alliance	691	1.96	-0.62
Total	35,294		

2014 European Parliament election in Denmark

Parties	Vote		
Parties	Votes	%	+ / -
Danish People's Party	10,321	34.41	+12.92
Social Democrats	5,653	18.85	-2.22
Venstre	4,962	16.54	-3.22
People's Movement against the EU	2,511	8.37	+2.31
Green Left	2,455	8.19	-6.25
Conservatives	2,102	7.01	-4.58
Social Liberals	1,215	4.05	+1.33
Liberal Alliance	773	2.58	+2.05
Total	29,992		

2009 European Parliament election in Denmark

Parties	Vote		
Parties	Votes	%	+ / -
Danish People's Party	6,746	21.49	+11.92
Social Democrats	6,616	21.07	-16.87
Venstre	6,204	19.76	+2.49
Green Left	4,535	14.44	+8.39
Conservatives	3,640	11.59	+0.71
People's Movement against the EU	1,904	6.06	+1.33
Social Liberals	855	2.72	-1.87
June Movement	732	2.33	-5.87
Liberal Alliance	165	0.53	New
Total	31,397		

2004 European Parliament election in Denmark

Parties	Vote		
Parties	Votes	%	+ / -
Social Democrats	6,683	37.94	+15.47
Venstre	3,042	17.27	-0.67
Conservatives	1,916	10.88	+1.20
Danish People's Party	1,685	9.57	+2.67
June Movement	1,445	8.20	-8.62
Green Left	1,066	6.05	-0.25
People's Movement against the EU	833	4.73	-2.84
Social Liberals	809	4.59	-2.52
Christian Democrats	135	0.77	-0.51
Total	17,614		

1999 European Parliament election in Denmark

Parties	Vote		
Parties	Votes	%	+ / -
Social Democrats	4,117	22.47	+2.41
Venstre	3,286	17.94	+2.44
June Movement	3,081	16.82	+1.14
Conservatives	1,774	9.68	-9.28
People's Movement against the EU	1,387	7.57	-3.14
Social Liberals	1,303	7.11	-0.39
Danish People's Party	1,265	6.90	New
Green Left	1,154	6.30	-1.26
Centre Democrats	720	3.93	+2.99
Christian Democrats	234	1.28	+0.74
Progress Party	95	0.52	-2.04
Total	18,321		

1994 European Parliament election in Denmark

Parties	Vote		
Parties	Votes	%	+ / -
Social Democrats	3,899	20.06	-6.76
Conservatives	3,685	18.96	+2.76
June Movement	3,048	15.68	New
Venstre	3,012	15.50	+4.01
People's Movement against the EU	2,081	10.71	-9.44
Green Left	1,469	7.56	-1.38
Social Liberals	1,458	7.50	+5.56
Progress Party	497	2.56	-2.72
Centre Democrats	183	0.94	-6.81
Christian Democrats	104	0.54	-0.89
Total	19,436		

1989 European Parliament election in Denmark

Parties	Vote		
Parties	Votes	%	+ / -
Social Democrats	4,803	26.82	+3.03
People's Movement against the EU	3,609	20.15	-0.50
Conservatives	2,901	16.20	-4.23
Venstre	2,057	11.49	+1.66
Green Left	1,601	8.94	-1.98
Centre Democrats	1,387	7.75	+1.35
Progress Party	946	5.28	+2.05
Social Liberals	347	1.94	-0.36
Christian Democrats	256	1.43	-0.32
Total	17,907		

1984 European Parliament election in Denmark

Parties	Vote	
Parties	Votes	%
Social Democrats	4,580	23.79
People's Movement against the EU	3,976	20.65
Conservatives	3,934	20.43
Green Left	2,103	10.92
Venstre	1,893	9.83
Centre Democrats	1,232	6.40
Progress Party	622	3.23
Social Liberals	442	2.30
Christian Democrats	336	1.75
Left Socialists	137	0.71
Total	19,255	

== Referendums ==
2022 Danish European Union opt-out referendum

Option	Votes	%
✓ YES	22,636	60.87
X NO	14,551	39.13

2015 Danish European Union opt-out referendum

Option	Votes	%
X NO	24,189	59.69
✓ YES	16,335	40.31

2014 Danish Unified Patent Court membership referendum

Option	Votes	%
✓ YES	17,308	58.44
X NO	12,308	41.56

2009 Danish Act of Succession referendum

Option	Votes	%
✓ YES	25,226	84.00
X NO	4,806	16.00

2000 Danish euro referendum

Option	Votes	%
X NO	21,096	57.80
✓ YES	15,405	42.20

1998 Danish Amsterdam Treaty referendum

Option	Votes	%
✓ YES	15,583	50.94
X NO	15,008	49.06

1993 Danish Maastricht Treaty referendum

Option	Votes	%
✓ YES	19,395	54.49
X NO	16,200	45.51

1992 Danish Maastricht Treaty referendum

Option	Votes	%
X NO	18,237	53.58
✓ YES	15,800	46.42

1986 Danish Single European Act referendum

Option	Votes	%
✓ YES	14,981	50.96
X NO	14,418	49.04

1972 Danish European Communities membership referendum

Option	Votes	%
✓ YES	20,399	64.35
X NO	11,302	35.65

1953 Danish constitutional and electoral age referendum

Option	Votes	%
✓ YES	12,380	81.53
X NO	2,805	18.47
23 years	8,350	52.96
21 years	7,416	47.04

1939 Danish constitutional referendum

Option	Votes	%
✓ YES	10,065	91.97
X NO	879	8.03
