= Haderslev (nomination district) =

- Haderslev
- Nomination district constituency for the Folketing
- Location of Haderslev within South Jutland

- Location of South Jutland within Denmark
- Municipalities: Haderslev
- Constituency: South Jutland
- Electorate: 40,657 (2022)

Current constituency
- Created: 1920

Haderslev nominating district is one of the 92 nominating districts that was created for Danish elections following the 2007 municipal reform. It consists of Haderslev Municipality. It was created in 1920 following its reunification with Denmark, though its boundaries have been changed since then.

In general elections, the district is a strong area for parties commonly associated with the blue bloc.

== General elections results ==
=== General elections in the 2020s ===
2022 Danish general election

Parties	Vote		
Parties	Votes	%	+ / -
Social Democrats	10,016	30.31	+2.93
Venstre	5,488	16.61	-11.52
Denmark Democrats	3,737	11.31	New
Moderates	2,722	8.24	New
New Right	2,504	7.58	+2.35
Liberal Alliance	2,075	6.28	+4.45
Green Left	1,614	4.88	+0.16
Conservatives	1,408	4.26	-0.23
Danish People's Party	1,168	3.53	-8.80
Red–Green Alliance	809	2.45	-1.93
Social Liberals	579	1.75	-3.11
The Alternative	472	1.43	-0.02
Christian Democrats	319	0.97	-1.52
Independent Greens	114	0.34	New
Kent Nielsen	16	0.05	New
Kenneth Vestergaard	4	0.01	New
Total	33,045		

=== General elections in the 2010s ===
2019 Danish general election

Parties	Vote		
Parties	Votes	%	+ / -
Venstre	9,611	28.13	+4.26
Social Democrats	9,357	27.38	+3.07
Danish People's Party	4,213	12.33	-15.95
New Right	1,786	5.23	New
Social Liberals	1,660	4.86	+2.10
Green Left	1,614	4.72	+2.13
Conservatives	1,534	4.49	+2.27
Red–Green Alliance	1,495	4.38	-0.65
Christian Democrats	852	2.49	+1.07
Stram Kurs	663	1.94	New
Liberal Alliance	627	1.83	-5.20
The Alternative	495	1.45	-1.05
Klaus Riskær Pedersen Party	240	0.70	New
Michael Thomsen	24	0.07	New
Total	34,171		

2015 Danish general election

Parties	Vote		
Parties	Votes	%	+ / -
Danish People's Party	10,030	28.28	+14.47
Social Democrats	8,621	24.31	+0.16
Venstre	8,465	23.87	-9.55
Liberal Alliance	2,494	7.03	+1.98
Red–Green Alliance	1,783	5.03	+1.13
Social Liberals	979	2.76	-3.40
Green Left	920	2.59	-5.79
The Alternative	885	2.50	New
Conservatives	788	2.22	-1.52
Christian Democrats	502	1.42	+0.08
Total	35,467		

2011 Danish general election

Parties	Vote		
Parties	Votes	%	+ / -
Venstre	11,973	33.42	-2.37
Social Democrats	8,652	24.15	+0.88
Danish People's Party	4,949	13.81	-2.00
Green Left	3,004	8.38	-2.93
Social Liberals	2,206	6.16	+3.29
Liberal Alliance	1,810	5.05	+3.15
Red–Green Alliance	1,397	3.90	+3.20
Conservatives	1,340	3.74	-3.44
Christian Democrats	480	1.34	+0.17
Jørn Bjorholm	10	0.03	New
Niesl-Aage Bjerre	5	0.01	New
Total	35,826		

=== General elections in the 2000s ===
2007 Danish general election

Parties	Vote		
Parties	Votes	%	+ / -
Venstre	12,798	35.79	+0.56
Social Democrats	8,319	23.27	-0.77
Danish People's Party	5,654	15.81	+0.64
Green Left	4,044	11.31	+5.98
Conservatives	2,568	7.18	-1.18
Social Liberals	1,025	2.87	-3.68
New Alliance	679	1.90	New
Christian Democrats	418	1.17	-1.38
Red–Green Alliance	251	0.70	-1.03
Total	35,756		

2005 Danish general election

Parties	Vote		
Parties	Votes	%	+ / -
Venstre	9,010	35.23	-0.20
Social Democrats	6,148	24.04	-3.13
Danish People's Party	3,878	15.17	+1.89
Conservatives	2,139	8.36	-0.80
Social Liberals	1,675	6.55	+2.89
Green Left	1,364	5.33	+0.48
Christian Democrats	653	2.55	-0.63
Red–Green Alliance	442	1.73	+0.59
Centre Democrats	215	0.84	-0.50
Minority Party	48	0.19	New
Total	25,572		

2001 Danish general election

Parties	Vote		
Parties	Votes	%	+ / -
Venstre	9,387	35.43	+8.26
Social Democrats	7,200	27.17	-5.56
Danish People's Party	3,519	13.28	+3.56
Conservatives	2,427	9.16	+0.34
Green Left	1,284	4.85	-1.11
Social Liberals	971	3.66	+0.51
Christian People's Party	842	3.18	-0.65
Centre Democrats	355	1.34	-3.05
Red–Green Alliance	302	1.14	-0.29
Progress Party	210	0.79	-1.52
Total	26,497		

=== General elections in the 1990s ===
1998 Danish general election

Parties	Vote		
Parties	Votes	%	+ / -
Social Democrats	8,655	32.73	-0.79
Venstre	7,185	27.17	+1.89
Danish People's Party	2,569	9.72	New
Conservatives	2,332	8.82	-8.52
Green Left	1,575	5.96	+0.68
Centre Democrats	1,160	4.39	+2.00
Christian People's Party	1,013	3.83	+1.13
Social Liberals	833	3.15	-0.67
Progress Party	610	2.31	-5.42
Red–Green Alliance	378	1.43	-0.43
Democratic Renewal	124	0.47	New
Leon Elmkjær	7	0.03	-0.04
Total	26,441		

1994 Danish general election

Parties	Vote		
Parties	Votes	%	+ / -
Social Democrats	8,583	33.52	-2.22
Venstre	6,473	25.28	+9.09
Conservatives	4,440	17.34	-2.67
Progress Party	1,979	7.73	-1.16
Green Left	1,353	5.28	-0.15
Social Liberals	977	3.82	+1.14
Christian People's Party	691	2.70	-0.73
Centre Democrats	612	2.39	-2.23
Red–Green Alliance	476	1.86	+1.12
Leon Elmkjær	19	0.07	New
Total	25,603		

1990 Danish general election

Parties	Vote		
Parties	Votes	%	+ / -
Social Democrats	9,002	35.74	+6.77
Conservatives	5,041	20.01	-2.98
Venstre	4,078	16.19	+3.78
Progress Party	2,239	8.89	-2.92
Green Left	1,367	5.43	-2.82
Centre Democrats	1,164	4.62	+0.02
Christian People's Party	865	3.43	+0.23
Social Liberals	674	2.68	-1.89
Common Course	293	1.16	-0.25
Red–Green Alliance	186	0.74	New
The Greens	152	0.60	-0.54
Justice Party of Denmark	126	0.50	New
Total	25,187		

=== General elections in the 1980s ===
1988 Danish general election

Parties	Vote		
Parties	Votes	%	+ / -
Social Democrats	7,522	28.97	-1.27
Conservatives	5,969	22.99	-2.20
Venstre	3,223	12.41	+1.35
Progress Party	3,066	11.81	+4.34
Green Left	2,143	8.25	-0.91
Centre Democrats	1,195	4.60	+0.31
Social Liberals	1,186	4.57	-0.28
Christian People's Party	832	3.20	-0.42
Common Course	365	1.41	+0.06
The Greens	297	1.14	-0.02
Communist Party of Denmark	84	0.32	-0.04
Left Socialists	84	0.32	-0.29
Total	25,966		

1987 Danish general election

Parties	Vote		
Parties	Votes	%	+ / -
Social Democrats	7,837	30.24	-0.80
Conservatives	6,527	25.19	-3.88
Venstre	2,867	11.06	-0.87
Green Left	2,374	9.16	+1.97
Progress Party	1,936	7.47	+1.96
Social Liberals	1,257	4.85	+0.77
Centre Democrats	1,113	4.29	-0.28
Christian People's Party	937	3.62	-0.36
Common Course	351	1.35	New
The Greens	301	1.16	New
Left Socialists	158	0.61	-0.40
Justice Party of Denmark	113	0.44	-0.82
Communist Party of Denmark	94	0.36	+0.06
Humanist Party	23	0.09	New
Socialist Workers Party	23	0.09	+0.03
Marxist–Leninists Party	5	0.02	+0.01
Total	25,916		

1984 Danish general election

Parties	Vote		
Parties	Votes	%	+ / -
Social Democrats	8,057	31.04	-1.83
Conservatives	7,546	29.07	+10.39
Venstre	3,096	11.93	+0.16
Green Left	1,866	7.19	+0.21
Progress Party	1,431	5.51	-5.90
Centre Democrats	1,187	4.57	-2.89
Social Liberals	1,059	4.08	-0.32
Christian People's Party	1,033	3.98	+0.50
Justice Party of Denmark	328	1.26	-0.08
Left Socialists	263	1.01	+0.10
Communist Party of Denmark	78	0.30	-0.24
Socialist Workers Party	15	0.06	-0.04
Marxist–Leninists Party	2	0.01	New
Total	25,961		

1981 Danish general election

Parties	Vote		
Parties	Votes	%	+ / -
Social Democrats	7,891	32.87	-4.05
Conservatives	4,485	18.68	+3.60
Venstre	2,825	11.77	-1.20
Progress Party	2,738	11.41	-2.60
Centre Democrats	1,791	7.46	+3.27
Green Left	1,675	6.98	+2.92
Social Liberals	1,056	4.40	+0.25
Christian People's Party	836	3.48	-0.35
Justice Party of Denmark	321	1.34	-0.85
Left Socialists	219	0.91	-0.51
Communist Party of Denmark	130	0.54	-0.40
Socialist Workers Party	24	0.10	New
Communist Workers Party	14	0.06	-0.19
Total	24,005		

=== General elections in the 1970s ===
1979 Danish general election

Parties	Vote		
Parties	Votes	%	+ / -
Social Democrats	9,005	36.92	+2.80
Conservatives	3,678	15.08	+4.16
Progress Party	3,417	14.01	-4.16
Venstre	3,163	12.97	+1.46
Centre Democrats	1,022	4.19	-3.65
Social Liberals	1,012	4.15	+0.82
Green Left	990	4.06	+1.48
Christian People's Party	934	3.83	-1.16
Justice Party of Denmark	534	2.19	-0.83
Left Socialists	347	1.42	+0.49
Communist Party of Denmark	229	0.94	-0.69
Communist Workers Party	62	0.25	New
Total	24,393		

1977 Danish general election

Parties	Vote		
Parties	Votes	%	+ / -
Social Democrats	8,328	34.12	+5.46
Progress Party	4,434	18.17	+2.07
Venstre	2,809	11.51	-11.43
Conservatives	2,665	10.92	+3.17
Centre Democrats	1,913	7.84	+4.03
Christian People's Party	1,217	4.99	-2.15
Social Liberals	814	3.33	-3.50
Justice Party of Denmark	736	3.02	+1.26
Green Left	629	2.58	+0.19
Communist Party of Denmark	397	1.63	-0.07
Pensioners' Party	239	0.98	New
Left Socialists	227	0.93	+0.04
Total	24,408		

1975 Danish general election

Parties	Vote		
Parties	Votes	%	+ / -
Social Democrats	6,871	28.66	+3.52
Venstre	5,500	22.94	+12.07
Progress Party	3,861	16.10	-2.68
Conservatives	1,858	7.75	-5.05
Christian People's Party	1,712	7.14	+1.49
Social Liberals	1,637	6.83	-4.10
Centre Democrats	913	3.81	-4.06
Green Left	573	2.39	-0.68
Justice Party of Denmark	423	1.76	-1.17
Communist Party of Denmark	407	1.70	+0.46
Left Socialists	213	0.89	+0.25
Marinus Roth	6	0.03	-0.05
Total	23,974		

1973 Danish general election

Parties	Vote		
Parties	Votes	%	+ / -
Social Democrats	6,001	25.14	-12.24
Progress Party	4,482	18.78	New
Conservatives	3,056	12.80	-7.89
Social Liberals	2,608	10.93	-2.88
Venstre	2,595	10.87	-3.51
Centre Democrats	1,878	7.87	New
Christian People's Party	1,348	5.65	+2.97
Green Left	733	3.07	-2.02
Justice Party of Denmark	700	2.93	+1.07
Communist Party of Denmark	295	1.24	+0.94
Left Socialists	153	0.64	+0.02
Marinus Roth	18	0.08	+0.07
Total	23,867		

1971 Danish general election

Parties	Vote		
Parties	Votes	%	+ / -
Social Democrats	8,455	37.38	+1.33
Conservatives	4,679	20.69	-4.19
Venstre	3,252	14.38	-1.24
Social Liberals	3,124	13.81	+1.42
Green Left	1,152	5.09	+1.86
Schleswig Party	721	3.19	-0.37
Christian People's Party	606	2.68	New
Justice Party of Denmark	421	1.86	+1.04
Left Socialists	141	0.62	-0.25
Communist Party of Denmark	67	0.30	-0.18
Marinus Roth	2	0.01	New
Total	22,620		

=== General elections in the 1960s ===
1968 Danish general election

Parties	Vote		
Parties	Votes	%	+ / -
Social Democrats	7,334	36.05	-7.51
Conservatives	5,062	24.88	+0.79
Venstre	3,177	15.62	-0.41
Social Liberals	2,521	12.39	+6.49
Schleswig Party	725	3.56	New
Green Left	658	3.23	-1.46
Liberal Centre	247	1.21	-0.91
Independent Party	177	0.87	-1.54
Left Socialists	177	0.87	New
Justice Party of Denmark	166	0.82	+0.05
Communist Party of Denmark	98	0.48	+0.05
Total	20,342		

1966 Danish general election

Parties	Vote		
Parties	Votes	%	+ / -
Social Democrats	8,616	43.56	+0.91
Conservatives	4,765	24.09	-0.21
Venstre	3,170	16.03	+0.20
Social Liberals	1,167	5.90	+2.00
Green Left	927	4.69	+2.24
Independent Party	477	2.41	-0.70
Liberal Centre	420	2.12	New
Justice Party of Denmark	153	0.77	-0.87
Communist Party of Denmark	85	0.43	-0.10
Total	19,780		

1964 Danish general election

Parties	Vote		
Parties	Votes	%	+ / -
Social Democrats	8,146	42.65	+1.42
Conservatives	4,641	24.30	+3.13
Venstre	3,024	15.83	-2.05
Schleswig Party	959	5.02	-0.67
Social Liberals	744	3.90	+0.14
Independent Party	594	3.11	-0.98
Green Left	468	2.45	-0.22
Justice Party of Denmark	314	1.64	-1.06
Danish Unity	109	0.57	New
Communist Party of Denmark	102	0.53	-0.27
Total	19,101		

1960 Danish general election

Parties	Vote		
Parties	Votes	%	+ / -
Social Democrats	7,386	41.23	+4.86
Conservatives	3,793	21.17	+2.07
Venstre	3,204	17.88	-1.08
Schleswig Party	1,019	5.69	-0.08
Independent Party	732	4.09	-1.68
Social Liberals	674	3.76	-1.26
Justice Party of Denmark	484	2.70	-4.40
Green Left	479	2.67	New
Communist Party of Denmark	144	0.80	-1.12
Total	17,915		

=== General elections in the 1950s ===
1957 Danish general election

Parties	Vote		
Parties	Votes	%	+ / -
Social Democrats	6,446	36.37	-2.68
Conservatives	3,385	19.10	-1.42
Venstre	3,361	18.96	-0.52
Justice Party of Denmark	1,258	7.10	+2.58
Schleswig Party	1,022	5.77	New
Independent Party	1,022	5.77	+3.62
Social Liberals	889	5.02	+0.22
Communist Party of Denmark	340	1.92	-0.51
Total	17,723		

September 1953 Danish Folketing election

Parties	Vote		
Parties	Votes	%	+ / -
Social Democrats	6,344	39.05	+1.37
Conservatives	3,333	20.52	-0.62
Venstre	3,165	19.48	+1.72
Hans Schmidt	1,144	7.04	+0.67
Social Liberals	780	4.80	-0.50
Justice Party of Denmark	734	4.52	-3.31
Communist Party of Denmark	395	2.43	-0.61
Independent Party	349	2.15	New
Total	16,244		

April 1953 Danish Folketing election

Parties	Vote		
Parties	Votes	%	+ / -
Social Democrats	5,883	37.68	-0.59
Conservatives	3,301	21.14	+0.09
Venstre	2,773	17.76	+0.28
Justice Party of Denmark	1,223	7.83	-2.70
Hans Schmidt	994	6.37	+1.25
Social Liberals	828	5.30	+0.67
Communist Party of Denmark	474	3.04	+0.13
Danish Unity	138	0.88	New
Total	15,614		

1950 Danish Folketing election

Parties	Vote		
Parties	Votes	%	+ / -
Social Democrats	5,929	38.27	-0.63
Conservatives	3,261	21.05	+7.99
Venstre	2,708	17.48	-6.23
Justice Party of Denmark	1,632	10.53	+5.51
Hans Schmidt	793	5.12	New
Social Liberals	718	4.63	+1.35
Communist Party of Denmark	451	2.91	-0.68
Total	15,492		

=== General elections in the 1940s ===
1947 Danish Folketing election

Parties	Vote		
Parties	Votes	%	+ / -
Social Democrats	6,093	38.90	+1.78
Venstre	3,713	23.71	+0.77
Conservatives	2,046	13.06	-9.25
J. Christmas Møller	956	6.10	New
W. Reuter	806	5.15	New
Justice Party of Denmark	787	5.02	+2.76
Communist Party of Denmark	563	3.59	-4.10
Social Liberals	514	3.28	-0.90
Danish Unity	185	1.18	-2.32
Total	15,663		

1945 Danish Folketing election

Parties	Vote		
Parties	Votes	%	+ / -
Social Democrats	5,751	37.12	-8.98
Venstre	3,554	22.94	+6.07
Conservatives	3,456	22.31	-2.35
Communist Party of Denmark	1,191	7.69	New
Social Liberals	648	4.18	-0.46
Danish Unity	543	3.50	+2.00
Justice Party of Denmark	350	2.26	+0.53
Total	15,493		

1943 Danish Folketing election

Parties	Vote		
Parties	Votes	%	+ / -
Social Democrats	6,671	46.10	+7.59
Conservatives	3,569	24.66	+2.27
Venstre	2,442	16.87	+0.31
Social Liberals	671	4.64	+0.34
National Socialist Workers' Party of Denmark	514	3.55	+0.63
Justice Party of Denmark	250	1.73	-0.16
Danish Unity	217	1.50	New
Farmers' Party	138	0.95	New
Total	14,472		

=== General elections in the 1930s ===
1939 Danish Folketing election

Parties	Vote		
Parties	Votes	%	+ / -
Social Democrats	6,101	38.51	+1.56
Conservatives	3,547	22.39	+1.72
Venstre	2,623	16.56	+4.54
Schleswig Party	2,054	12.97	-0.60
Social Liberals	681	4.30	+0.04
National Socialist Workers' Party of Denmark	463	2.92	-0.28
Justice Party of Denmark	300	1.89	-1.19
National Cooperation	73	0.46	New
Total	15,842		

1935 Danish Folketing election

Parties	Vote		
Parties	Votes	%	+ / -
Social Democrats	5,033	36.95	+1.24
Conservatives	2,815	20.67	-4.09
Schleswig Party	1,849	13.57	+1.59
Venstre	1,638	12.02	-6.63
Independent People's Party	626	4.60	New
Social Liberals	580	4.26	-0.60
National Socialist Workers' Party of Denmark	436	3.20	New
Justice Party of Denmark	420	3.08	+0.43
Communist Party of Denmark	169	1.24	-0.15
Society Party	56	0.41	New
Total	13,622		

1932 Danish Folketing election

Parties	Vote		
Parties	Votes	%	+ / -
Social Democrats	4,368	35.71	+4.26
Conservatives	3,029	24.76	+1.48
Venstre	2,281	18.65	-4.34
Schleswig Party	1,465	11.98	-0.87
Social Liberals	594	4.86	-1.48
Justice Party of Denmark	324	2.65	+0.20
Communist Party of Denmark	170	1.39	+0.77
Total	12,231		

=== General elections in the 1920s ===
1929 Danish Folketing election

Parties	Vote		
Parties	Votes	%	+ / -
Social Democrats	3,639	31.45	+3.00
Conservatives	2,693	23.28	-0.35
Venstre	2,660	22.99	-0.34
Schleswig Party	1,487	12.85	-1.01
Social Liberals	734	6.34	-1.08
Justice Party of Denmark	284	2.45	+0.87
Communist Party of Denmark	72	0.62	+0.54
Total	11,569		

1926 Danish Folketing election

Parties	Vote		
Parties	Votes	%	+ / -
Social Democrats	3,136	28.45	+4.47
Conservatives	2,604	23.63	-1.94
Venstre	2,571	23.33	-0.33
Schleswig Party	1,528	13.86	+0.37
Social Liberals	818	7.42	-4.18
Independence Party	182	1.65	New
Justice Party of Denmark	174	1.58	+0.88
Communist Party of Denmark	9	0.08	New
Total	11,022		

1924 Danish Folketing election

Parties	Vote		
Parties	Votes	%	+ / -
Conservatives	2,456	25.57	+5.13
Social Democrats	2,303	23.98	+7.00
Venstre	2,272	23.66	-9.53
Schleswig Party	1,296	13.49	+0.93
Social Liberals	1,114	11.60	-1.46
Farmer Party	96	1.00	New
Justice Party of Denmark	67	0.70	New
Total	9,604		

September 1920 Danish Folketing election

Parties	Vote		
Parties	Votes	%	+ / -
Venstre	3,093	33.19	
Conservatives	1,905	20.44	
Social Democrats	1,582	16.98	
Social Liberals	1,217	13.06	
Schleswig Party	1,170	12.56	
Industry Party	252	2.70	
Danish Left Socialist Party	99	1.06	
Total	9,318		

== European Parliament elections results ==
2024 European Parliament election in Denmark

Parties	Vote		
Parties	Votes	%	+ / -
Venstre	4,568	21.22	-4.16
Social Democrats	3,777	17.55	-5.47
Green Left	2,404	11.17	+3.09
Denmark Democrats	2,341	10.87	New
Danish People's Party	2,033	9.44	-9.81
Conservatives	1,898	8.82	+3.58
Liberal Alliance	1,531	7.11	+3.74
Moderates	1,104	5.13	New
Social Liberals	891	4.14	-2.39
Red–Green Alliance	689	3.20	-0.53
The Alternative	291	1.35	-0.72
Total	21,527		

2019 European Parliament election in Denmark

Parties	Vote		
Parties	Votes	%	+ / -
Venstre	6,718	25.38	+4.07
Social Democrats	6,093	23.02	+5.55
Danish People's Party	5,094	19.25	-12.87
Green Left	2,139	8.08	+0.96
Social Liberals	1,728	6.53	+2.39
Conservatives	1,388	5.24	-3.76
Red–Green Alliance	988	3.73	New
Liberal Alliance	892	3.37	+0.83
People's Movement against the EU	880	3.32	-2.98
The Alternative	547	2.07	New
Total	26,467		

2014 European Parliament election in Denmark

Parties	Vote		
Parties	Votes	%	+ / -
Danish People's Party	7,237	32.12	+13.75
Venstre	4,802	21.31	-4.15
Social Democrats	3,936	17.47	-2.65
Conservatives	2,029	9.00	-3.90
Green Left	1,605	7.12	-6.10
People's Movement against the EU	1,419	6.30	+1.43
Social Liberals	932	4.14	+1.32
Liberal Alliance	573	2.54	+2.11
Total	22,533		

2009 European Parliament election in Denmark

Parties	Vote		
Parties	Votes	%	+ / -
Venstre	6,054	25.46	+3.73
Social Democrats	4,784	20.12	-15.35
Danish People's Party	4,368	18.37	+11.27
Green Left	3,144	13.22	+7.14
Conservatives	3,067	12.90	+2.00
People's Movement against the EU	1,157	4.87	+1.84
Social Liberals	670	2.82	-1.32
June Movement	433	1.82	-7.55
Liberal Alliance	103	0.43	New
Total	23,780		

2004 European Parliament election in Denmark

Parties	Vote		
Parties	Votes	%	+ / -
Social Democrats	5,003	35.47	+21.07
Venstre	3,065	21.73	-2.91
Conservatives	1,537	10.90	-1.77
June Movement	1,322	9.37	-7.82
Danish People's Party	1,001	7.10	+0.84
Green Left	858	6.08	+1.02
Social Liberals	584	4.14	-4.22
People's Movement against the EU	427	3.03	-2.54
Christian Democrats	308	2.18	-0.56
Total	14,105		

1999 European Parliament election in Denmark

Parties	Vote		
Parties	Votes	%	+ / -
Venstre	3,664	24.64	+3.32
June Movement	2,557	17.19	+3.13
Social Democrats	2,141	14.40	-0.43
Conservatives	1,884	12.67	-10.08
Social Liberals	1,244	8.36	+2.50
Danish People's Party	931	6.26	New
People's Movement against the EU	828	5.57	-3.22
Green Left	752	5.06	-1.47
Centre Democrats	464	3.12	+2.42
Christian Democrats	407	2.74	+1.12
Progress Party	234	1.57	-1.97
Total	14,872		

1994 European Parliament election in Denmark

Parties	Vote		
Parties	Votes	%	+ / -
Conservatives	3,661	22.75	+6.31
Venstre	3,431	21.32	+2.43
Social Democrats	2,386	14.83	-7.24
June Movement	2,262	14.06	New
People's Movement against the EU	1,415	8.79	-5.08
Green Left	1,051	6.53	+0.48
Social Liberals	943	5.86	+3.35
Progress Party	569	3.54	-4.11
Christian Democrats	261	1.62	-2.22
Centre Democrats	112	0.70	-7.97
Total	16,091		

1989 European Parliament election in Denmark

Parties	Vote		
Parties	Votes	%	+ / -
Social Democrats	3,063	22.07	+2.23
Venstre	2,621	18.89	+5.72
Conservatives	2,282	16.44	-10.23
People's Movement against the EU	1,925	13.87	-2.72
Centre Democrats	1,203	8.67	+1.16
Progress Party	1,061	7.65	+3.34
Green Left	840	6.05	+1.07
Christian Democrats	533	3.84	+0.36
Social Liberals	349	2.51	-0.44
Total	13,877		

1984 European Parliament election in Denmark

Parties	Vote	
Parties	Votes	%
Conservatives	4,217	26.67
Social Democrats	3,138	19.84
People's Movement against the EU	2,624	16.59
Venstre	2,083	13.17
Centre Democrats	1,188	7.51
Green Left	788	4.98
Progress Party	681	4.31
Christian Democrats	550	3.48
Social Liberals	466	2.95
Left Socialists	79	0.50
Total	15,814	

== Referendums ==
2022 Danish European Union opt-out referendum

Option	Votes	%
✓ YES	16,410	60.74
X NO	10,609	39.26

2015 Danish European Union opt-out referendum

Option	Votes	%
X NO	17,021	56.66
✓ YES	13,021	43.34

2014 Danish Unified Patent Court membership referendum

Option	Votes	%
✓ YES	14,055	63.78
X NO	7,981	36.22

2009 Danish Act of Succession referendum

Option	Votes	%
✓ YES	19,449	85.19
X NO	3,380	14.81

2000 Danish euro referendum

Option	Votes	%
X NO	13,925	51.78
✓ YES	12,967	48.22

1998 Danish Amsterdam Treaty referendum

Option	Votes	%
✓ YES	13,177	55.91
X NO	10,391	44.09

1993 Danish Maastricht Treaty referendum

Option	Votes	%
✓ YES	15,525	58.81
X NO	10,874	41.19

1992 Danish Maastricht Treaty referendum

Option	Votes	%
✓ YES	13,017	51.44
X NO	12,288	48.56

1986 Danish Single European Act referendum

Option	Votes	%
✓ YES	14,648	65.13
X NO	7,844	34.87

1972 Danish European Communities membership referendum

Option	Votes	%
✓ YES	17,565	72.36
X NO	6,709	27.64

1953 Danish constitutional and electoral age referendum

Option	Votes	%
✓ YES	8,840	81.01
X NO	2,072	18.99
23 years	6,490	58.92
21 years	4,525	41.08

1939 Danish constitutional referendum

Option	Votes	%
✓ YES	6,442	91.57
X NO	593	8.43
