= Køge (nomination district) =

Danish election district

- Køge
- Nomination district constituency for the Folketing
- Location of Køge within Zealand

- Location of Zealand within Denmark
- Municipalities: Køge; Lejre
- Constituency: Zealand
- Electorate: 66,088 (2022)

Current constituency
- Created: 1849 (as constituency); 1920 (as nomination district)

Køge nominating district is one of the 92 nominating districts that exists for Danish elections following the 2007 municipal reform. It consists of Køge and Lejre municipality. It was created in 1849 as a constituency, and has been a nomination district since 1920, though its boundaries have been changed on many occasions since then.

In general elections, the district tends to vote a bit more for parties commonly associated with the blue bloc.

== General elections results ==
=== General elections in the 2020s ===
2022 Danish general election

Parties	Vote		
Parties	Votes	%	+ / -
Social Democrats	13,939	24.90	+2.17
Green Left	7,843	14.01	-0.09
Venstre	7,707	13.77	-11.55
Moderates	6,457	11.53	New
Liberal Alliance	4,209	7.52	+5.50
Denmark Democrats	3,986	7.12	New
Conservatives	2,748	4.91	-2.05
New Right	2,090	3.73	+1.06
Danish People's Party	1,905	3.40	-5.95
Red–Green Alliance	1,763	3.15	-1.29
Social Liberals	1,572	2.81	-3.68
The Alternative	1,229	2.20	+0.27
Independent Greens	325	0.58	New
Christian Democrats	146	0.26	-0.59
Lisa Sofia Larsson	36	0.06	New
Rasmus Paludan	26	0.05	New
Total	55,981		

=== General elections in the 2010s ===
2019 Danish general election

Parties	Vote		
Parties	Votes	%	+ / -
Venstre	14,106	25.32	+3.97
Social Democrats	12,661	22.73	-2.30
Green Left	7,854	14.10	+7.75
Danish People's Party	5,210	9.35	-14.34
Conservatives	3,879	6.96	+4.03
Social Liberals	3,616	6.49	+2.68
Red–Green Alliance	2,474	4.44	-1.44
New Right	1,488	2.67	New
Stram Kurs	1,195	2.15	New
Liberal Alliance	1,128	2.02	-5.17
The Alternative	1,073	1.93	-1.45
Klaus Riskær Pedersen Party	542	0.97	New
Christian Democrats	474	0.85	+0.52
Pinki Karin Yvonne Jensen	7	0.01	New
Total	55,707		

2015 Danish general election

Parties	Vote		
Parties	Votes	%	+ / -
Social Democrats	13,784	25.03	+3.42
Danish People's Party	13,045	23.69	+7.86
Venstre	11,758	21.35	-6.81
Liberal Alliance	3,957	7.19	+1.72
Green Left	3,498	6.35	-2.86
Red–Green Alliance	3,236	5.88	+0.46
Social Liberals	2,097	3.81	-4.92
The Alternative	1,860	3.38	New
Conservatives	1,613	2.93	-2.29
Christian Democrats	184	0.33	+0.02
Aamer Ahmad	18	0.03	New
Michael Christiansen	13	0.02	New
Bent A. Jespersen	2	0.00	-0.01
Total	55,065		

2011 Danish general election

Parties	Vote		
Parties	Votes	%	+ / -
Venstre	15,259	28.16	-0.93
Social Democrats	11,711	21.61	-3.05
Danish People's Party	8,580	15.83	-0.23
Green Left	4,990	9.21	-2.22
Social Liberals	4,729	8.73	+4.43
Liberal Alliance	2,966	5.47	+2.27
Red–Green Alliance	2,939	5.42	+3.84
Conservatives	2,831	5.22	-4.08
Christian Democrats	167	0.31	-0.07
Johan Isbrandt Haulik	9	0.02	New
Bent A. Jespersen	4	0.01	New
Peter Lotinga	0	0.00	New
Total	54,185		

=== General elections in the 2000s ===
2007 Danish general election

Parties	Vote		
Parties	Votes	%	+ / -
Venstre	15,506	29.09	-4.83
Social Democrats	13,145	24.66	+1.74
Danish People's Party	8,562	16.06	-1.69
Green Left	6,090	11.43	+6.82
Conservatives	4,957	9.30	+0.10
Social Liberals	2,292	4.30	-2.94
New Alliance	1,703	3.20	New
Red–Green Alliance	840	1.58	-0.65
Christian Democrats	205	0.38	-0.46
Total	53,300		

2005 Danish general election

Parties	Vote		
Parties	Votes	%	+ / -
Venstre	24,985	33.92	-1.91
Social Democrats	16,879	22.92	-4.65
Danish People's Party	13,073	17.75	+2.93
Conservatives	6,775	9.20	+0.42
Social Liberals	5,336	7.24	+3.69
Green Left	3,395	4.61	-0.05
Red–Green Alliance	1,645	2.23	+0.86
Centre Democrats	799	1.08	-0.65
Christian Democrats	620	0.84	-0.44
Minority Party	145	0.20	New
Total	73,652		

2001 Danish general election

Parties	Vote		
Parties	Votes	%	+ / -
Venstre	27,449	35.83	+9.09
Social Democrats	21,120	27.57	-6.31
Danish People's Party	11,353	14.82	+4.39
Conservatives	6,727	8.78	-1.11
Green Left	3,571	4.66	-1.72
Social Liberals	2,722	3.55	+0.80
Centre Democrats	1,327	1.73	-3.41
Red–Green Alliance	1,053	1.37	-0.34
Christian People's Party	978	1.28	-0.01
Progress Party	312	0.41	-1.11
Total	76,612		

=== General elections in the 1990s ===
1998 Danish general election

Parties	Vote		
Parties	Votes	%	+ / -
Social Democrats	25,356	33.88	+0.68
Venstre	20,013	26.74	+1.30
Danish People's Party	7,805	10.43	New
Conservatives	7,398	9.89	-6.71
Green Left	4,774	6.38	+0.07
Centre Democrats	3,848	5.14	+0.92
Social Liberals	2,061	2.75	-1.14
Red–Green Alliance	1,282	1.71	-0.81
Progress Party	1,141	1.52	-5.26
Christian People's Party	967	1.29	+0.34
Democratic Renewal	190	0.25	New
Total	74,835		

1994 Danish general election

Parties	Vote		
Parties	Votes	%	+ / -
Social Democrats	24,153	33.20	-2.77
Venstre	18,506	25.44	+11.03
Conservatives	12,074	16.60	-2.79
Progress Party	4,933	6.78	+0.61
Green Left	4,591	6.31	-1.29
Centre Democrats	3,072	4.22	-3.71
Social Liberals	2,831	3.89	+0.93
Red–Green Alliance	1,836	2.52	+1.33
Christian People's Party	694	0.95	-0.03
Anton Strunge	51	0.07	New
Total	72,741		

1990 Danish general election

Parties	Vote		
Parties	Votes	%	+ / -
Social Democrats	24,658	35.97	+7.86
Conservatives	13,289	19.39	-3.32
Venstre	9,878	14.41	+6.05
Centre Democrats	5,436	7.93	+1.74
Green Left	5,211	7.60	-5.83
Progress Party	4,230	6.17	-3.75
Social Liberals	2,029	2.96	-2.93
Common Course	1,324	1.93	-0.05
Red–Green Alliance	818	1.19	New
Christian People's Party	675	0.98	+0.17
The Greens	619	0.90	-0.62
Justice Party of Denmark	360	0.53	New
Humanist Party	17	0.02	New
Total	68,544		

=== General elections in the 1980s ===
1988 Danish general election

Parties	Vote		
Parties	Votes	%	+ / -
Social Democrats	19,386	28.11	+1.18
Conservatives	15,657	22.71	-2.48
Green Left	9,264	13.43	-2.09
Progress Party	6,842	9.92	+5.25
Venstre	5,767	8.36	+1.28
Centre Democrats	4,271	6.19	-0.34
Social Liberals	4,062	5.89	-0.80
Common Course	1,368	1.98	-0.53
The Greens	1,047	1.52	+0.04
Christian People's Party	557	0.81	-0.22
Communist Party of Denmark	509	0.74	-0.07
Left Socialists	228	0.33	-0.45
Total	68,958		

1987 Danish general election

Parties	Vote		
Parties	Votes	%	+ / -
Social Democrats	18,693	26.93	-2.92
Conservatives	17,485	25.19	-3.41
Green Left	10,773	15.52	+2.98
Venstre	4,917	7.08	-1.78
Social Liberals	4,641	6.69	+0.77
Centre Democrats	4,532	6.53	+1.20
Progress Party	3,240	4.67	+1.13
Common Course	1,740	2.51	New
The Greens	1,029	1.48	New
Christian People's Party	718	1.03	-0.05
Communist Party of Denmark	563	0.81	+0.16
Left Socialists	541	0.78	-0.98
Justice Party of Denmark	374	0.54	-1.25
Humanist Party	127	0.18	New
Socialist Workers Party	26	0.04	-0.02
Marxist–Leninists Party	25	0.04	+0.03
Total	69,424		

1984 Danish general election

Parties	Vote		
Parties	Votes	%	+ / -
Social Democrats	19,426	29.85	-0.44
Conservatives	18,616	28.60	+12.71
Green Left	8,159	12.54	+0.21
Venstre	5,767	8.86	-0.31
Social Liberals	3,851	5.92	0.00
Centre Democrats	3,472	5.33	-5.10
Progress Party	2,304	3.54	-6.68
Justice Party of Denmark	1,168	1.79	-0.02
Left Socialists	1,147	1.76	0.00
Christian People's Party	702	1.08	+0.30
Communist Party of Denmark	425	0.65	-0.48
Socialist Workers Party	40	0.06	+0.01
Marxist–Leninists Party	7	0.01	New
Total	65,084		

1981 Danish general election

Parties	Vote		
Parties	Votes	%	+ / -
Social Democrats	17,570	30.29	-7.29
Conservatives	9,219	15.89	+1.11
Green Left	7,152	12.33	+6.08
Centre Democrats	6,048	10.43	+6.61
Progress Party	5,930	10.22	-2.22
Venstre	5,320	9.17	+0.06
Social Liberals	3,435	5.92	-0.20
Justice Party of Denmark	1,051	1.81	-1.22
Left Socialists	1,022	1.76	-1.22
Communist Party of Denmark	655	1.13	-1.29
Christian People's Party	454	0.78	-0.23
Communist Workers Party	123	0.21	-0.21
Socialist Workers Party	27	0.05	New
Total	58,006		

=== General elections in the 1970s ===
1979 Danish general election

Parties	Vote		
Parties	Votes	%	+ / -
Social Democrats	21,708	37.58	+1.34
Conservatives	8,535	14.78	+6.51
Progress Party	7,183	12.44	-5.33
Venstre	5,264	9.11	+0.58
Green Left	3,613	6.25	+1.87
Social Liberals	3,536	6.12	+2.56
Centre Democrats	2,204	3.82	-4.84
Justice Party of Denmark	1,749	3.03	-0.83
Left Socialists	1,723	2.98	+0.86
Communist Party of Denmark	1,398	2.42	-1.80
Christian People's Party	586	1.01	-0.48
Communist Workers Party	245	0.42	New
Poul Rasmussen	12	0.02	New
Rasmus Byberg	6	0.01	New
Total	57,762		

1977 Danish general election

Parties	Vote		
Parties	Votes	%	+ / -
Social Democrats	19,590	36.24	+8.76
Progress Party	9,604	17.77	-0.01
Centre Democrats	4,681	8.66	+5.76
Venstre	4,613	8.53	-12.81
Conservatives	4,470	8.27	+2.98
Green Left	2,369	4.38	-1.17
Communist Party of Denmark	2,279	4.22	-0.24
Justice Party of Denmark	2,089	3.86	+1.98
Social Liberals	1,926	3.56	-4.73
Left Socialists	1,147	2.12	+0.36
Christian People's Party	805	1.49	-1.77
Pensioners' Party	481	0.89	New
Total	54,054		

1975 Danish general election

Parties	Vote		
Parties	Votes	%	+ / -
Social Democrats	13,575	27.48	+6.00
Venstre	10,540	21.34	+11.80
Progress Party	8,784	17.78	-1.45
Social Liberals	4,097	8.29	-3.22
Green Left	2,742	5.55	-0.34
Conservatives	2,611	5.29	-3.90
Communist Party of Denmark	2,203	4.46	+0.81
Christian People's Party	1,612	3.26	+1.34
Centre Democrats	1,434	2.90	-10.30
Justice Party of Denmark	928	1.88	-0.99
Left Socialists	871	1.76	+0.25
Johs. Feddersen	2	0.00	New
Thomas Kaxe	0	0.00	New
Total	49,399		

1973 Danish general election

Parties	Vote		
Parties	Votes	%	+ / -
Social Democrats	10,236	21.48	-15.17
Progress Party	9,163	19.23	New
Centre Democrats	6,287	13.20	New
Social Liberals	5,484	11.51	-4.57
Venstre	4,547	9.54	-2.26
Conservatives	4,378	9.19	-11.01
Green Left	2,808	5.89	-3.08
Communist Party of Denmark	1,738	3.65	+1.34
Justice Party of Denmark	1,369	2.87	+1.30
Christian People's Party	916	1.92	+1.14
Left Socialists	719	1.51	-0.12
Total	47,645		

1971 Danish general election

Parties	Vote		
Parties	Votes	%	+ / -
Social Democrats	14,630	36.65	+3.26
Conservatives	8,064	20.20	-3.58
Social Liberals	6,419	16.08	-2.37
Venstre	4,710	11.80	+2.41
Green Left	3,580	8.97	+1.58
Communist Party of Denmark	921	2.31	+0.77
Left Socialists	650	1.63	-1.63
Justice Party of Denmark	627	1.57	+1.01
Christian People's Party	312	0.78	New
Total	39,913		

=== General elections in the 1960s ===
1968 Danish general election

Parties	Vote		
Parties	Votes	%	+ / -
Social Democrats	21,695	33.39	-5.93
Conservatives	15,451	23.78	+2.43
Social Liberals	11,986	18.45	+10.50
Venstre	6,099	9.39	-2.11
Green Left	4,799	7.39	-6.20
Left Socialists	2,116	3.26	New
Liberal Centre	1,291	1.99	-1.68
Communist Party of Denmark	1,001	1.54	+0.31
Justice Party of Denmark	366	0.56	+0.12
Independent Party	150	0.23	-0.71
H. Søndersted Andersen	6	0.01	New
Kirsten Lonning	6	0.01	New
Thode Karlsen	0	0.00	-0.02
Total	64,966		

1966 Danish general election

Parties	Vote		
Parties	Votes	%	+ / -
Social Democrats	22,987	39.32	-5.64
Conservatives	12,482	21.35	-1.73
Green Left	7,945	13.59	+6.97
Venstre	6,722	11.50	-3.78
Social Liberals	4,648	7.95	+3.12
Liberal Centre	2,144	3.67	New
Communist Party of Denmark	718	1.23	-0.68
Independent Party	547	0.94	-0.76
Justice Party of Denmark	259	0.44	-0.56
Thode Karlsen	10	0.02	New
Total	58,462		

1964 Danish general election

Parties	Vote		
Parties	Votes	%	+ / -
Social Democrats	21,145	44.96	-2.51
Conservatives	10,857	23.08	+4.94
Venstre	7,187	15.28	+0.84
Green Left	3,115	6.62	-1.03
Social Liberals	2,270	4.83	-1.31
Communist Party of Denmark	898	1.91	+0.05
Independent Party	800	1.70	-0.66
Justice Party of Denmark	470	1.00	-0.94
Peace Politics People's Party	175	0.37	New
Danish Unity	104	0.22	New
Elin Høgsbro Appel	14	0.03	New
Total	47,035		

1960 Danish general election

Parties	Vote		
Parties	Votes	%	+ / -
Social Democrats	17,693	47.47	+2.62
Conservatives	6,761	18.14	+3.69
Venstre	5,382	14.44	-5.36
Green Left	2,852	7.65	New
Social Liberals	2,287	6.14	-3.53
Independent Party	878	2.36	+1.47
Justice Party of Denmark	724	1.94	-3.86
Communist Party of Denmark	695	1.86	-2.69
Total	37,272		

=== General elections in the 1950s ===
1957 Danish general election

Parties	Vote		
Parties	Votes	%	+ / -
Social Democrats	13,953	44.85	-2.23
Venstre	6,160	19.80	+3.97
Conservatives	4,494	14.45	-0.66
Social Liberals	3,008	9.67	-0.88
Justice Party of Denmark	1,804	5.80	+1.80
Communist Party of Denmark	1,415	4.55	-1.43
Independent Party	277	0.89	-0.56
Total	31,111		

September 1953 Danish Folketing election

Parties	Vote		
Parties	Votes	%	+ / -
Social Democrats	12,533	47.08	+1.06
Venstre	4,215	15.83	+6.05
Conservatives	4,023	15.11	-2.73
Social Liberals	2,807	10.55	+0.03
Communist Party of Denmark	1,591	5.98	-2.15
Justice Party of Denmark	1,065	4.00	-2.78
Independent Party	385	1.45	New
Total	26,619		

April 1953 Danish Folketing election

Parties	Vote		
Parties	Votes	%	+ / -
Social Democrats	23,796	46.02	+0.12
Conservatives	9,226	17.84	+0.23
Social Liberals	5,441	10.52	+0.56
Venstre	5,055	9.78	+1.11
Communist Party of Denmark	4,203	8.13	-0.01
Justice Party of Denmark	3,508	6.78	-2.95
Danish Unity	476	0.92	New
Total	51,705		

1950 Danish Folketing election

Parties	Vote		
Parties	Votes	%	+ / -
Social Democrats	20,497	45.90	-1.12
Conservatives	7,863	17.61	+5.59
Social Liberals	4,449	9.96	+2.27
Justice Party of Denmark	4,343	9.73	+5.24
Venstre	3,871	8.67	-6.73
Communist Party of Denmark	3,634	8.14	-3.83
Total	44,657		

=== General elections in the 1940s ===
1947 Danish Folketing election

Parties	Vote		
Parties	Votes	%	+ / -
Social Democrats	18,830	47.02	+10.23
Venstre	6,168	15.40	+4.75
Conservatives	4,815	12.02	-6.60
Communist Party of Denmark	4,795	11.97	-7.97
Social Liberals	3,080	7.69	-1.82
Justice Party of Denmark	1,799	4.49	+2.92
Danish Unity	556	1.39	-1.51
Total	40,043		

1945 Danish Folketing election

Parties	Vote		
Parties	Votes	%	+ / -
Social Democrats	13,793	36.79	-17.82
Communist Party of Denmark	7,475	19.94	New
Conservatives	6,979	18.62	-2.03
Venstre	3,994	10.65	+4.03
Social Liberals	3,564	9.51	-0.77
Danish Unity	1,088	2.90	-0.38
Justice Party of Denmark	588	1.57	+0.11
Edward Hjalmar Larsen	6	0.02	New
Total	37,487		

1943 Danish Folketing election

Parties	Vote		
Parties	Votes	%	+ / -
Social Democrats	18,978	54.61	+0.08
Conservatives	7,176	20.65	+2.49
Social Liberals	3,572	10.28	+0.56
Venstre	2,302	6.62	-0.74
Danish Unity	1,139	3.28	+2.60
National Socialist Workers' Party of Denmark	1,074	3.09	+1.29
Justice Party of Denmark	506	1.46	-0.63
Chr. Orla Nielsen	8	0.02	New
Total	34,755		

=== General elections in the 1930s ===
1939 Danish Folketing election

Parties	Vote		
Parties	Votes	%	+ / -
Social Democrats	14,811	54.53	-6.57
Conservatives	4,933	18.16	+1.31
Social Liberals	2,641	9.72	+1.26
Venstre	1,998	7.36	+0.83
Communist Party of Denmark	1,109	4.08	+1.79
Justice Party of Denmark	569	2.09	-0.77
National Socialist Workers' Party of Denmark	488	1.80	+1.12
National Cooperation	217	0.80	New
Farmers' Party	212	0.78	-0.44
Danish Unity	184	0.68	New
Total	27,162		

1935 Danish Folketing election

Parties	Vote		
Parties	Votes	%	+ / -
Social Democrats	14,561	61.10	+3.87
Conservatives	4,016	16.85	+1.08
Social Liberals	2,017	8.46	-0.69
Venstre	1,557	6.53	-6.30
Justice Party of Denmark	682	2.86	-0.42
Communist Party of Denmark	546	2.29	+0.56
Independent People's Party	290	1.22	New
National Socialist Workers' Party of Denmark	161	0.68	New
Total	23,830		

1932 Danish Folketing election

Parties	Vote		
Parties	Votes	%	+ / -
Social Democrats	11,356	57.23	+3.41
Conservatives	3,129	15.77	-0.21
Venstre	2,546	12.83	-4.25
Social Liberals	1,815	9.15	-1.42
Justice Party of Denmark	651	3.28	+1.19
Communist Party of Denmark	343	1.73	+1.27
W. Colding	4	0.02	New
Christian Sørensen	0	0.00	New
Total	19,844		

=== General elections in the 1920s ===
1929 Danish Folketing election

Parties	Vote		
Parties	Votes	%	+ / -
Social Democrats	8,977	53.82	+7.72
Venstre	2,849	17.08	-0.41
Conservatives	2,666	15.98	-4.99
Social Liberals	1,764	10.57	-3.14
Justice Party of Denmark	348	2.09	+0.71
Communist Party of Denmark	77	0.46	+0.11
Total	16,681		

1926 Danish Folketing election

Parties	Vote		
Parties	Votes	%	+ / -
Social Democrats	6,528	46.10	+4.53
Conservatives	2,970	20.97	+1.96
Venstre	2,476	17.49	-1.65
Social Liberals	1,942	13.71	-4.17
Justice Party of Denmark	195	1.38	+0.62
Communist Party of Denmark	49	0.35	-0.37
Total	14,160		

1924 Danish Folketing election

Parties	Vote		
Parties	Votes	%	+ / -
Social Democrats	5,230	41.57	+3.85
Venstre	2,408	19.14	-4.63
Conservatives	2,391	19.01	-0.39
Social Liberals	2,249	17.88	+2.04
Farmer Party	115	0.91	New
Justice Party of Denmark	96	0.76	New
Communist Party of Denmark	91	0.72	New
Total	12,580		

September 1920 Danish Folketing election

Parties	Vote		
Parties	Votes	%	+ / -
Social Democrats	4,140	37.72	+3.23
Venstre	2,609	23.77	-1.50
Conservatives	2,130	19.40	-2.34
Social Liberals	1,739	15.84	+1.23
Industry Party	322	2.93	-0.86
Danish Left Socialist Party	37	0.34	New
Total	10,977		

July 1920 Danish Folketing election

Parties	Vote		
Parties	Votes	%	+ / -
Social Democrats	3,087	34.49	+0.10
Venstre	2,262	25.27	+0.95
Conservatives	1,946	21.74	+1.38
Social Liberals	1,308	14.61	-0.59
Industry Party	339	3.79	-0.50
A. Sterregaard	8	0.09	New
Total	8,950		

April 1920 Danish Folketing election

Parties	Vote	
Parties	Votes	%
Social Democrats	3,326	34.39
Venstre	2,352	24.32
Conservatives	1,969	20.36
Social Liberals	1,470	15.20
Industry Party	415	4.29
Centrum	127	1.31
Daniel Nielsen	13	0.13
Total	9,672	

== European Parliament elections results ==
2024 European Parliament election in Denmark

Parties	Vote		
Parties	Votes	%	+ / -
Green Left	7,108	18.48	+3.77
Social Democrats	5,812	15.11	-5.85
Venstre	5,723	14.88	-8.98
Conservatives	3,500	9.10	+2.94
Danish People's Party	3,077	8.00	-4.53
Moderates	2,870	7.46	New
Liberal Alliance	2,733	7.10	+5.24
Social Liberals	2,408	6.26	-2.37
Denmark Democrats	2,356	6.12	New
Red–Green Alliance	2,107	5.48	+1.04
The Alternative	778	2.02	-0.64
Total	38,472		

2019 European Parliament election in Denmark

Parties	Vote		
Parties	Votes	%	+ / -
Venstre	10,372	23.86	+7.25
Social Democrats	9,115	20.96	+3.46
Green Left	6,397	14.71	+4.33
Danish People's Party	5,449	12.53	-18.96
Social Liberals	3,751	8.63	+3.21
Conservatives	2,677	6.16	-2.12
Red–Green Alliance	1,931	4.44	New
People's Movement against the EU	1,821	4.19	-3.37
The Alternative	1,156	2.66	New
Liberal Alliance	809	1.86	-0.90
Total	43,478		

2014 European Parliament election in Denmark

Parties	Vote		
Parties	Votes	%	+ / -
Danish People's Party	11,585	31.49	+13.04
Social Democrats	6,438	17.50	-2.52
Venstre	6,113	16.61	-3.98
Green Left	3,819	10.38	-5.37
Conservatives	3,045	8.28	-3.76
People's Movement against the EU	2,782	7.56	+0.68
Social Liberals	1,996	5.42	+1.74
Liberal Alliance	1,015	2.76	+2.18
Total	36,793		

2009 European Parliament election in Denmark

Parties	Vote		
Parties	Votes	%	+ / -
Venstre	7,449	20.59	+2.40
Social Democrats	7,244	20.02	-12.71
Danish People's Party	6,677	18.45	+8.69
Green Left	5,698	15.75	+9.90
Conservatives	4,356	12.04	-3.91
People's Movement against the EU	2,488	6.88	+1.96
Social Liberals	1,332	3.68	-0.66
June Movement	732	2.02	-5.68
Liberal Alliance	209	0.58	New
Total	36,185		

2004 European Parliament election in Denmark

Parties	Vote		
Parties	Votes	%	+ / -
Social Democrats	13,450	32.73	+17.65
Venstre	7,475	18.19	-5.86
Conservatives	6,555	15.95	+6.38
Danish People's Party	4,012	9.76	+1.06
June Movement	3,163	7.70	-7.73
Green Left	2,405	5.85	-0.82
People's Movement against the EU	2,020	4.92	-1.61
Social Liberals	1,784	4.34	-4.09
Christian Democrats	224	0.55	-0.69
Total	41,088		

1999 European Parliament election in Denmark

Parties	Vote		
Parties	Votes	%	+ / -
Venstre	10,213	24.05	+6.84
June Movement	6,551	15.43	-0.77
Social Democrats	6,405	15.08	-0.48
Conservatives	4,063	9.57	-11.03
Danish People's Party	3,693	8.70	New
Social Liberals	3,580	8.43	-0.66
Green Left	2,834	6.67	-1.40
People's Movement against the EU	2,772	6.53	-2.10
Centre Democrats	1,828	4.30	+3.28
Christian Democrats	526	1.24	+0.85
Progress Party	225	0.53	-2.69
Total	42,465		

1994 European Parliament election in Denmark

Parties	Vote		
Parties	Votes	%	+ / -
Conservatives	9,136	20.60	+5.07
Venstre	7,633	17.21	+3.68
June Movement	7,187	16.20	New
Social Democrats	6,903	15.56	-8.08
Social Liberals	4,032	9.09	+6.57
People's Movement against the EU	3,828	8.63	-10.69
Green Left	3,578	8.07	-1.56
Progress Party	1,429	3.22	-2.23
Centre Democrats	454	1.02	-8.23
Christian Democrats	173	0.39	-0.74
Total	44,353		

1989 European Parliament election in Denmark

Parties	Vote		
Parties	Votes	%	+ / -
Social Democrats	8,585	23.64	+4.91
People's Movement against the EU	7,015	19.32	-3.49
Conservatives	5,638	15.53	-7.96
Venstre	4,914	13.53	+5.34
Green Left	3,498	9.63	-0.67
Centre Democrats	3,357	9.25	+2.27
Progress Party	1,980	5.45	+1.24
Social Liberals	914	2.52	-0.75
Christian Democrats	409	1.13	-0.12
Total	36,310		

1984 European Parliament election in Denmark

Parties	Vote	
Parties	Votes	%
Conservatives	8,678	23.49
People's Movement against the EU	8,428	22.81
Social Democrats	6,920	18.73
Green Left	3,805	10.30
Venstre	3,025	8.19
Centre Democrats	2,579	6.98
Progress Party	1,557	4.21
Social Liberals	1,208	3.27
Christian Democrats	461	1.25
Left Socialists	280	0.76
Total	36,941	

== Referendums ==
2022 Danish European Union opt-out referendum

Option	Votes	%
✓ YES	29,952	66.57
X NO	15,042	33.43

2015 Danish European Union opt-out referendum

Option	Votes	%
X NO	25,545	54.58
✓ YES	21,260	45.42

2014 Danish Unified Patent Court membership referendum

Option	Votes	%
✓ YES	22,448	62.60
X NO	13,410	37.40

2009 Danish Act of Succession referendum

Option	Votes	%
✓ YES	28,794	84.95
X NO	5,101	15.05

2000 Danish euro referendum

Option	Votes	%
X NO	40,085	52.26
✓ YES	36,612	47.74

1998 Danish Amsterdam Treaty referendum

Option	Votes	%
✓ YES	36,724	55.19
X NO	29,820	44.81

1993 Danish Maastricht Treaty referendum

Option	Votes	%
✓ YES	44,408	59.48
X NO	30,248	40.52

1992 Danish Maastricht Treaty referendum

Option	Votes	%
✓ YES	37,465	52.28
X NO	34,204	47.72

1986 Danish Single European Act referendum

Option	Votes	%
✓ YES	31,794	54.83
X NO	26,189	45.17

1972 Danish European Communities membership referendum

Option	Votes	%
✓ YES	28,990	64.01
X NO	16,300	35.99

1953 Danish constitutional and electoral age referendum

Option	Votes	%
✓ YES	29,825	75.41
X NO	9,728	24.59
21 years	21,339	50.90
23 years	20,586	49.10

1939 Danish constitutional referendum

Option	Votes	%
✓ YES	20,207	93.35
X NO	1,440	6.65
