= 1966 Danish general election =

- 22 November 1966
- All 179 seats in the Folketing; 90 seats needed for a majority
- Turnout: 88.61%
Party	Leader	Vote %	Seats	+/–
Social Democrats	Jens Otto Krag	38.26	69	−7
Venstre	Poul Hartling	19.29	35	−3
Conservatives	Poul Sørensen	18.68	34	−2
SF	Aksel Larsen	10.90	20	+10
Social Liberals	Karl Skytte	7.30	13	+3
Liberal Centre	Bent Noack	2.48	4	New
Elected in the Faroe Islands
Social Democratic	Peter Mohr Dam	36.56	1	0
People's	Hákun Djurhuus	33.58	1	0
Elected in Greenland
Independents	–	100	2	0
This lists parties that won seats. See the complete results below.
Government before	Government after election
Krag II; Social Democrats	Krag II; Social Democrats

General elections were held in Denmark on 22 November 1966, although in Greenland the elections were held on 6 December 1966. The Social Democratic Party remained the largest in the Folketing, with 69 of the 179 seats. Voter turnout was 89% in Denmark proper, 49% in the Faroe Islands and 59% in Greenland (where only one of the two constituencies was contested as the other had only one candidate who was elected unopposed).

== Results ==
Party	Votes	%	Seats	+/–
Denmark proper
Social Democrats	1,068,911	38.26	69	–7
Venstre	539,027	19.29	35	–3
Conservative People's Party	522,028	18.68	34	–2
Socialist People's Party	304,437	10.90	20	+10
Danish Social Liberal Party	203,858	7.30	13	+3
Liberal Centre	69,180	2.48	4	New
Independent Party	44,994	1.61	0	–5
Communist Party of Denmark	21,553	0.77	0	0
Justice Party of Denmark	19,905	0.71	0	0
Independents	114	0.00	0	0
Total	2,794,007	100.00	175	0
Valid votes	2,794,007	99.70		
Invalid/blank votes	8,297	0.30		
Total votes	2,802,304	100.00		
Registered voters/turnout	3,162,352	88.61		
Faroe Islands
Social Democratic Party	3,864	36.56	1	0
People's Party	3,549	33.58	1	+1
Union Party	3,156	29.86	0	–1
Total	10,569	100.00	2	0
Valid votes	10,569	99.51		
Invalid/blank votes	52	0.49		
Total votes	10,621	100.00		
Registered voters/turnout	21,754	48.82		
Greenland
Independents	6,535	100.00	2	0
Total	6,535	100.00	2	0
Valid votes	6,535	98.05		
Invalid/blank votes	130	1.95		
Total votes	6,665	100.00		
Registered voters/turnout	11,289	59.04		
Source: Nohlen & Stöver, Danmarks Statistik

=== By constituency ===
Candidate	Party	Votes	%	Notes
Greenland (Northern Constituency)
Knud Hertling	Independent			Elected unopposed
Total				
Greenland (Southern Constituency)
Nikolaj Rosing	Independent	3,677	56.27	Elected
Ulrik Rosing	Inuit Party	1,367	20.92	
Erling Høegh	Independent	1,291	19.76	
Jørgen Olsen	Independent	200	3.06	
Total		6,535	100.00	
Valid votes		6,535	98.05	
Invalid/blank votes		130	1.95	
Total votes		6,665	100.00	
Registered voters/turnout		11,289	59.04	
Source: Danmarks Statistik
