= Liberal Centre =

Defunct political party in Denmark

Liberal Centre Liberalt Centrum
- Abbreviation: LC
- Leader: Thorkil Kristensen
- Founded: 10 September 1965
- Dissolved: 1969
- Split from: Venstre

The Liberal Centre (Danish: Liberalt Centrum) was a political party in Denmark between 1965 and 1969.

== History ==
The party was established on 10 September 1965. Amongst its founders were Niels Westerby and Børge Diderichsen, who had left Venstre over taxation policy.

The party received 2.5% of the national vote in the 1966 elections, winning four seats. However, with its vote share reduced to 1.3%, party lost all four seats in the 1968 elections. It was dissolved the following year.
