= Svendborg (nomination district) =

- Svendborg
- Nomination district constituency for the Folketing
- Location of Svendborg within Funen

- Location of Funen within Denmark
- Municipalities: Langeland; Svendborg
- Constituency: Funen
- Electorate: 55,447 (2022)

Current constituency
- Created: 1849 (as constituency); 1920 (as nomination district)

Svendborg nominating district is one of the 92 nominating districts that exists for Danish elections following the 2007 municipal reform. It consists of Langeland and Svendborg municipality. It was created in 1849 as a constituency, and has been a nomination district since 1920, though its boundaries have been changed since then.

In general elections, the district is a strong area for parties commonly associated with the red bloc.

== General elections results ==
=== General elections in the 2020s ===
2022 Danish general election

Parties	Vote		
Parties	Votes	%	+ / -
Social Democrats	15,949	34.71	+3.76
Venstre	4,780	10.40	-11.43
Moderates	4,257	9.26	New
Denmark Democrats	3,810	8.29	New
Green Left	3,799	8.27	+1.74
Red–Green Alliance	2,948	6.42	-2.62
Liberal Alliance	2,555	5.56	+4.16
Conservatives	1,814	3.95	-1.95
The Alternative	1,724	3.75	-0.12
New Right	1,519	3.31	+1.42
Danish People's Party	1,221	2.66	-6.28
Social Liberals	1,167	2.54	-3.49
Independent Greens	170	0.37	New
Christian Democrats	154	0.34	-0.66
Millah Kongsbach	82	0.18	New
Total	45,949		

=== General elections in the 2010s ===
2019 Danish general election

Parties	Vote		
Parties	Votes	%	+ / -
Social Democrats	14,147	30.95	+4.58
Venstre	9,979	21.83	+4.19
Red–Green Alliance	4,134	9.04	-1.66
Danish People's Party	4,087	8.94	-14.22
Green Left	2,987	6.53	+2.29
Social Liberals	2,756	6.03	+3.09
Conservatives	2,698	5.90	+2.79
The Alternative	1,769	3.87	-2.42
New Right	862	1.89	New
Stram Kurs	810	1.77	New
Liberal Alliance	638	1.40	-3.82
Christian Democrats	459	1.00	+0.66
Klaus Riskær Pedersen Party	387	0.85	New
Total	45,713		

2015 Danish general election

Parties	Vote		
Parties	Votes	%	+ / -
Social Democrats	12,210	26.37	-0.78
Danish People's Party	10,721	23.16	+10.71
Venstre	8,166	17.64	-5.79
Red–Green Alliance	4,953	10.70	+2.29
The Alternative	2,911	6.29	New
Liberal Alliance	2,416	5.22	+1.54
Green Left	1,964	4.24	-7.06
Conservatives	1,438	3.11	-1.49
Social Liberals	1,359	2.94	-5.52
Christian Democrats	159	0.34	-0.13
Total	46,297		

2011 Danish general election

Parties	Vote		
Parties	Votes	%	+ / -
Social Democrats	13,049	27.15	+1.72
Venstre	11,263	23.43	+0.22
Danish People's Party	5,982	12.45	-3.04
Green Left	5,429	11.30	-3.35
Social Liberals	4,064	8.46	+3.22
Red–Green Alliance	4,043	8.41	+5.83
Conservatives	2,209	4.60	-6.08
Liberal Alliance	1,767	3.68	+1.36
Christian Democrats	228	0.47	+0.10
Lars Grønbæk Larsen	16	0.03	New
Michael Ellegård	13	0.03	0.00
Total	48,063		

=== General elections in the 2000s ===
2007 Danish general election

Parties	Vote		
Parties	Votes	%	+ / -
Social Democrats	12,107	25.43	-1.26
Venstre	11,047	23.21	-1.06
Danish People's Party	7,372	15.49	+1.06
Green Left	6,973	14.65	+8.00
Conservatives	5,086	10.68	-2.50
Social Liberals	2,492	5.24	-3.53
Red–Green Alliance	1,229	2.58	-1.40
New Alliance	1,105	2.32	New
Christian Democrats	177	0.37	-0.45
Michael Ellegård	14	0.03	New
Total	47,602		

2005 Danish general election

Parties	Vote		
Parties	Votes	%	+ / -
Social Democrats	9,769	26.69	-3.15
Venstre	8,884	24.27	-3.66
Danish People's Party	5,282	14.43	+1.89
Conservatives	4,826	13.18	+2.53
Social Liberals	3,212	8.77	+3.53
Green Left	2,433	6.65	-1.36
Red–Green Alliance	1,457	3.98	+1.41
Centre Democrats	324	0.89	-0.51
Christian Democrats	300	0.82	-0.47
Minority Party	117	0.32	New
Total	36,604		

2001 Danish general election

Parties	Vote		
Parties	Votes	%	+ / -
Social Democrats	11,225	29.84	-7.33
Venstre	10,506	27.93	+3.80
Danish People's Party	4,716	12.54	+5.15
Conservatives	4,005	10.65	+3.33
Green Left	3,015	8.01	-1.09
Social Liberals	1,972	5.24	+0.52
Red–Green Alliance	967	2.57	-0.45
Centre Democrats	526	1.40	-2.63
Christian People's Party	487	1.29	-0.17
Progress Party	203	0.54	-0.81
Total	37,622		

=== General elections in the 1990s ===
1998 Danish general election

Parties	Vote		
Parties	Votes	%	+ / -
Social Democrats	14,006	37.17	-0.55
Venstre	9,091	24.13	+0.51
Green Left	3,428	9.10	+1.12
Danish People's Party	2,783	7.39	New
Conservatives	2,760	7.32	-4.36
Social Liberals	1,779	4.72	-0.64
Centre Democrats	1,518	4.03	+1.90
Red–Green Alliance	1,138	3.02	-0.27
Christian People's Party	552	1.46	+0.42
Progress Party	508	1.35	-5.72
Democratic Renewal	112	0.30	New
Svend Jensen	7	0.02	New
Total	37,682		

1994 Danish general election

Parties	Vote		
Parties	Votes	%	+ / -
Social Democrats	13,853	37.72	-0.96
Venstre	8,673	23.62	+5.58
Conservatives	4,289	11.68	-1.08
Green Left	2,930	7.98	-1.10
Progress Party	2,597	7.07	-0.49
Social Liberals	1,968	5.36	+1.21
Red–Green Alliance	1,210	3.29	+1.71
Centre Democrats	783	2.13	-1.54
Christian People's Party	381	1.04	-0.26
Leif Nybo	19	0.05	New
Michael Ellegård	13	0.04	New
Else Lundgaard	9	0.02	New
Bjørn Henriksen	1	0.00	New
Total	36,726		

1990 Danish general election

Parties	Vote		
Parties	Votes	%	+ / -
Social Democrats	13,967	38.68	+8.29
Venstre	6,515	18.04	+4.67
Conservatives	4,609	12.76	-5.00
Green Left	3,278	9.08	-4.10
Progress Party	2,729	7.56	-1.89
Social Liberals	1,497	4.15	-1.87
Centre Democrats	1,326	3.67	+0.31
Red–Green Alliance	571	1.58	New
Common Course	515	1.43	-0.96
Christian People's Party	470	1.30	+0.07
The Greens	414	1.15	-0.56
Justice Party of Denmark	196	0.54	New
Humanist Party	15	0.04	New
Tage Abildgart	3	0.01	New
Mogens Trondhjem	3	0.01	New
Total	36,108		

=== General elections in the 1980s ===
1988 Danish general election

Parties	Vote		
Parties	Votes	%	+ / -
Social Democrats	11,246	30.39	+1.23
Conservatives	6,570	17.76	-2.57
Venstre	4,947	13.37	+1.86
Green Left	4,878	13.18	-1.36
Progress Party	3,498	9.45	+4.69
Social Liberals	2,228	6.02	-1.46
Centre Democrats	1,244	3.36	-0.09
Common Course	884	2.39	-0.59
The Greens	632	1.71	+0.02
Christian People's Party	456	1.23	-0.39
Communist Party of Denmark	221	0.60	+0.01
Left Socialists	193	0.52	-0.79
Carl Erik Jørgensen	6	0.02	New
Total	37,003		

1987 Danish general election

Parties	Vote		
Parties	Votes	%	+ / -
Social Democrats	10,920	29.16	-2.06
Conservatives	7,612	20.33	-2.39
Green Left	5,446	14.54	+3.16
Venstre	4,312	11.51	-2.48
Social Liberals	2,800	7.48	+1.05
Progress Party	1,782	4.76	+1.32
Centre Democrats	1,293	3.45	-0.91
Common Course	1,117	2.98	New
The Greens	632	1.69	New
Christian People's Party	605	1.62	-0.21
Left Socialists	491	1.31	-1.21
Communist Party of Denmark	221	0.59	+0.09
Justice Party of Denmark	132	0.35	-1.15
Humanist Party	52	0.14	New
Socialist Workers Party	20	0.05	0.00
Henrik Nørregård Nielsen	10	0.03	New
Marxist–Leninists Party	4	0.01	-0.03
Total	37,449		

1984 Danish general election

Parties	Vote		
Parties	Votes	%	+ / -
Social Democrats	11,561	31.22	-1.99
Conservatives	8,415	22.72	+9.34
Venstre	5,180	13.99	+0.67
Green Left	4,216	11.38	+0.84
Social Liberals	2,380	6.43	+0.77
Centre Democrats	1,613	4.36	-4.61
Progress Party	1,274	3.44	-5.76
Left Socialists	935	2.52	+0.25
Christian People's Party	679	1.83	+0.66
Justice Party of Denmark	557	1.50	+0.05
Communist Party of Denmark	185	0.50	-0.17
Socialist Workers Party	20	0.05	+0.01
Marxist–Leninists Party	13	0.04	New
Carl Erik Jørgensen	5	0.01	New
Total	37,033		

1981 Danish general election

Parties	Vote		
Parties	Votes	%	+ / -
Social Democrats	11,407	33.21	-5.60
Conservatives	4,596	13.38	+1.92
Venstre	4,574	13.32	-0.99
Green Left	3,620	10.54	+4.98
Progress Party	3,162	9.20	-3.39
Centre Democrats	3,080	8.97	+5.76
Social Liberals	1,944	5.66	-0.03
Left Socialists	779	2.27	-0.48
Justice Party of Denmark	499	1.45	-1.17
Christian People's Party	401	1.17	-0.29
Communist Party of Denmark	231	0.67	-0.61
Communist Workers Party	29	0.08	-0.17
Socialist Workers Party	15	0.04	New
Anders Bondo Christensen	15	0.04	New
Total	34,352		

=== General elections in the 1970s ===
1979 Danish general election

Parties	Vote		
Parties	Votes	%	+ / -
Social Democrats	13,351	38.81	+1.65
Venstre	4,923	14.31	0.00
Progress Party	4,331	12.59	-2.78
Conservatives	3,942	11.46	+2.82
Social Liberals	1,957	5.69	+0.86
Green Left	1,912	5.56	+2.09
Centre Democrats	1,105	3.21	-1.98
Left Socialists	946	2.75	+1.07
Justice Party of Denmark	902	2.62	-0.89
Christian People's Party	502	1.46	-1.05
Communist Party of Denmark	442	1.28	-1.12
Communist Workers Party	85	0.25	New
Total	34,398		

1977 Danish general election

Parties	Vote		
Parties	Votes	%	+ / -
Social Democrats	12,510	37.16	+5.40
Progress Party	5,174	15.37	+2.91
Venstre	4,817	14.31	-13.25
Conservatives	2,908	8.64	+3.21
Centre Democrats	1,748	5.19	+3.73
Social Liberals	1,626	4.83	-3.70
Justice Party of Denmark	1,181	3.51	+1.83
Green Left	1,169	3.47	-0.06
Christian People's Party	845	2.51	-0.93
Communist Party of Denmark	808	2.40	-0.40
Left Socialists	565	1.68	+0.33
Pensioners' Party	311	0.92	New
Total	33,662		

1975 Danish general election

Parties	Vote		
Parties	Votes	%	+ / -
Social Democrats	10,540	31.76	+3.73
Venstre	9,147	27.56	+14.61
Progress Party	4,135	12.46	-4.31
Social Liberals	2,831	8.53	-5.91
Conservatives	1,801	5.43	-4.07
Green Left	1,170	3.53	-0.41
Christian People's Party	1,140	3.44	+0.81
Communist Party of Denmark	930	2.80	+0.52
Justice Party of Denmark	557	1.68	-1.01
Centre Democrats	483	1.46	-4.27
Left Socialists	449	1.35	+0.31
Hans Clausen Pilegaard	2	0.01	New
Gunner Pedersen	1	0.00	New
Oscar Andersen	0	0.00	New
Ivan Folmer-Larsen	0	0.00	New
E. Just Jensen	0	0.00	New
Total	33,186		

1973 Danish general election

Parties	Vote		
Parties	Votes	%	+ / -
Social Democrats	9,292	28.03	-11.28
Progress Party	5,560	16.77	New
Social Liberals	4,786	14.44	-4.51
Venstre	4,292	12.95	-3.04
Conservatives	3,150	9.50	-5.64
Centre Democrats	1,901	5.73	New
Green Left	1,305	3.94	-2.07
Justice Party of Denmark	892	2.69	+1.12
Christian People's Party	873	2.63	+1.65
Communist Party of Denmark	756	2.28	+1.38
Left Socialists	344	1.04	-0.10
Total	33,151		

1971 Danish general election

Parties	Vote		
Parties	Votes	%	+ / -
Social Democrats	12,373	39.31	+1.04
Social Liberals	5,964	18.95	+6.91
Venstre	5,031	15.99	-1.99
Conservatives	4,765	15.14	-7.77
Green Left	1,893	6.01	+0.96
Justice Party of Denmark	494	1.57	+0.92
Left Socialists	359	1.14	-0.12
Christian People's Party	309	0.98	New
Communist Party of Denmark	284	0.90	+0.27
Total	31,472		

=== General elections in the 1960s ===
1968 Danish general election

Parties	Vote		
Parties	Votes	%	+ / -
Social Democrats	7,531	38.27	-5.07
Conservatives	4,509	22.91	+2.57
Venstre	3,539	17.98	-0.25
Social Liberals	2,369	12.04	+6.06
Green Left	994	5.05	-3.15
Left Socialists	247	1.26	New
Liberal Centre	170	0.86	-0.95
Justice Party of Denmark	127	0.65	+0.20
Communist Party of Denmark	124	0.63	+0.25
Independent Party	70	0.36	-0.91
Total	19,680		

1966 Danish general election

Parties	Vote		
Parties	Votes	%	+ / -
Social Democrats	8,347	43.34	-3.48
Conservatives	3,917	20.34	-0.66
Venstre	3,511	18.23	-1.78
Green Left	1,579	8.20	+4.26
Social Liberals	1,151	5.98	+2.19
Liberal Centre	349	1.81	New
Independent Party	245	1.27	-0.90
Justice Party of Denmark	87	0.45	-0.31
Communist Party of Denmark	74	0.38	-0.37
Total	19,260		

1964 Danish general election

Parties	Vote		
Parties	Votes	%	+ / -
Social Democrats	8,667	46.82	-0.28
Conservatives	3,887	21.00	+2.21
Venstre	3,704	20.01	-2.70
Green Left	729	3.94	-0.17
Social Liberals	702	3.79	+0.23
Independent Party	402	2.17	+0.15
Justice Party of Denmark	141	0.76	-0.38
Communist Party of Denmark	138	0.75	+0.19
Peace Politics People's Party	87	0.47	New
Danish Unity	55	0.30	New
Total	18,512		

1960 Danish general election

Parties	Vote		
Parties	Votes	%	+ / -
Social Democrats	8,264	47.10	+1.67
Venstre	3,985	22.71	-3.54
Conservatives	3,297	18.79	+1.20
Green Left	721	4.11	New
Social Liberals	625	3.56	-1.20
Independent Party	355	2.02	+1.02
Justice Party of Denmark	200	1.14	-2.22
Communist Party of Denmark	98	0.56	-1.05
Total	17,545		

=== General elections in the 1950s ===
1957 Danish general election

Parties	Vote		
Parties	Votes	%	+ / -
Social Democrats	7,864	45.43	-3.76
Venstre	4,544	26.25	+4.06
Conservatives	3,044	17.59	-0.90
Social Liberals	824	4.76	+0.38
Justice Party of Denmark	582	3.36	+1.47
Communist Party of Denmark	278	1.61	-0.83
Independent Party	173	1.00	-0.41
Total	17,309		

September 1953 Danish Folketing election

Parties	Vote		
Parties	Votes	%	+ / -
Social Democrats	8,088	49.19	+1.13
Venstre	3,649	22.19	+0.96
Conservatives	3,040	18.49	-0.55
Social Liberals	721	4.38	-0.74
Communist Party of Denmark	402	2.44	-0.35
Justice Party of Denmark	311	1.89	-1.30
Independent Party	232	1.41	New
Total	16,443		

April 1953 Danish Folketing election

Parties	Vote		
Parties	Votes	%	+ / -
Social Democrats	7,513	48.06	+2.28
Venstre	3,319	21.23	+3.16
Conservatives	2,976	19.04	-4.17
Social Liberals	800	5.12	+0.31
Justice Party of Denmark	498	3.19	-2.00
Communist Party of Denmark	436	2.79	-0.13
Danish Unity	90	0.58	New
Total	15,632		

1950 Danish Folketing election

Parties	Vote		
Parties	Votes	%	+ / -
Social Democrats	7,029	45.78	-1.53
Conservatives	3,564	23.21	+7.26
Venstre	2,775	18.07	-5.83
Justice Party of Denmark	797	5.19	+2.12
Social Liberals	739	4.81	+0.43
Communist Party of Denmark	449	2.92	-1.46
Total	15,353		

=== General elections in the 1940s ===
1947 Danish Folketing election

Parties	Vote		
Parties	Votes	%	+ / -
Social Democrats	7,372	47.31	+9.21
Venstre	3,724	23.90	+3.97
Conservatives	2,486	15.95	-7.30
Social Liberals	683	4.38	-0.36
Communist Party of Denmark	682	4.38	-5.93
Justice Party of Denmark	478	3.07	+2.03
Danish Unity	157	1.01	-1.61
Total	15,582		

1945 Danish Folketing election

Parties	Vote		
Parties	Votes	%	+ / -
Social Democrats	5,903	38.10	-10.23
Conservatives	3,602	23.25	-2.64
Venstre	3,088	19.93	+4.38
Communist Party of Denmark	1,598	10.31	New
Social Liberals	735	4.74	-1.39
Danish Unity	406	2.62	+1.48
Justice Party of Denmark	161	1.04	+0.15
Total	15,493		

1943 Danish Folketing election

Parties	Vote		
Parties	Votes	%	+ / -
Social Democrats	7,409	48.33	+4.14
Conservatives	3,968	25.89	+4.08
Venstre	2,383	15.55	-2.52
Social Liberals	939	6.13	-1.22
National Socialist Workers' Party of Denmark	298	1.94	+0.15
Danish Unity	175	1.14	+0.44
Justice Party of Denmark	136	0.89	-0.44
Farmers' Party	21	0.14	-0.43
Total	15,329		

=== General elections in the 1930s ===
1939 Danish Folketing election

Parties	Vote		
Parties	Votes	%	+ / -
Social Democrats	5,468	44.19	-4.39
Conservatives	2,698	21.81	-1.79
Venstre	2,236	18.07	+2.52
Social Liberals	909	7.35	+0.11
National Cooperation	287	2.32	New
Communist Party of Denmark	232	1.88	+0.68
National Socialist Workers' Party of Denmark	221	1.79	+0.75
Justice Party of Denmark	165	1.33	-0.71
Danish Unity	86	0.70	New
Farmers' Party	71	0.57	-0.19
Total	12,373		

1935 Danish Folketing election

Parties	Vote		
Parties	Votes	%	+ / -
Social Democrats	6,005	48.58	+5.14
Conservatives	2,917	23.60	-0.88
Venstre	1,922	15.55	-6.86
Social Liberals	895	7.24	+0.21
Justice Party of Denmark	252	2.04	-0.06
Communist Party of Denmark	148	1.20	+0.66
National Socialist Workers' Party of Denmark	129	1.04	New
Independent People's Party	94	0.76	New
Total	12,362		

1932 Danish Folketing election

Parties	Vote		
Parties	Votes	%	+ / -
Social Democrats	5,245	43.44	+1.30
Conservatives	2,955	24.48	+1.15
Venstre	2,706	22.41	-2.47
Social Liberals	849	7.03	-1.18
Justice Party of Denmark	253	2.10	+1.03
Communist Party of Denmark	65	0.54	+0.17
Total	12,073		

=== General elections in the 1920s ===
1929 Danish Folketing election

Parties	Vote		
Parties	Votes	%	+ / -
Social Democrats	4,785	42.14	+1.89
Venstre	2,825	24.88	+1.30
Conservatives	2,649	23.33	-5.31
Social Liberals	932	8.21	+1.16
Justice Party of Denmark	122	1.07	+0.85
Communist Party of Denmark	42	0.37	+0.11
Total	11,355		

1926 Danish Folketing election

Parties	Vote		
Parties	Votes	%	+ / -
Social Democrats	4,593	40.25	+1.10
Conservatives	3,268	28.64	-0.87
Venstre	2,690	23.58	+1.41
Social Liberals	804	7.05	-0.75
Communist Party of Denmark	30	0.26	+0.02
Justice Party of Denmark	25	0.22	-0.18
Total	11,410		

1924 Danish Folketing election

Parties	Vote		
Parties	Votes	%	+ / -
Social Democrats	4,285	39.15	+3.17
Conservatives	3,230	29.51	+0.17
Venstre	2,426	22.17	-2.81
Social Liberals	854	7.80	+1.92
Farmer Party	79	0.72	New
Justice Party of Denmark	44	0.40	New
Communist Party of Denmark	26	0.24	New
Total	10,944		

September 1920 Danish Folketing election

Parties	Vote		
Parties	Votes	%	+ / -
Social Democrats	3,860	35.98	+4.03
Conservatives	3,148	29.34	-1.97
Venstre	2,680	24.98	-2.82
Social Liberals	631	5.88	+0.70
Industry Party	400	3.73	-0.03
Danish Left Socialist Party	10	0.09	New
Total	10,729		

July 1920 Danish Folketing election

Parties	Vote		
Parties	Votes	%	+ / -
Social Democrats	2,967	31.95	+0.03
Conservatives	2,908	31.31	-0.04
Venstre	2,582	27.80	-0.04
Social Liberals	481	5.18	-0.16
Industry Party	349	3.76	+0.21
Total	9,287		

April 1920 Danish Folketing election

Parties	Vote	
Parties	Votes	%
Social Democrats	3,065	31.92
Conservatives	3,011	31.35
Venstre	2,673	27.84
Social Liberals	513	5.34
Industry Party	341	3.55
Total	9,603	

== European Parliament elections results ==
2024 European Parliament election in Denmark

Parties	Vote		
Parties	Votes	%	+ / -
Green Left	6,368	20.16	+5.55
Social Democrats	5,830	18.46	-4.53
Venstre	4,344	13.75	-6.17
Red–Green Alliance	2,764	8.75	+1.75
Denmark Democrats	2,280	7.22	New
Danish People's Party	2,065	6.54	-4.00
Conservatives	1,979	6.27	-0.03
Moderates	1,833	5.80	New
Social Liberals	1,702	5.39	-3.09
Liberal Alliance	1,663	5.27	+3.50
The Alternative	754	2.39	-1.47
Total	31,582		

2019 European Parliament election in Denmark

Parties	Vote		
Parties	Votes	%	+ / -
Social Democrats	8,109	22.99	+4.88
Venstre	7,024	19.92	+7.44
Green Left	5,154	14.61	+1.04
Danish People's Party	3,716	10.54	-15.15
Social Liberals	2,990	8.48	+3.46
Red–Green Alliance	2,468	7.00	New
Conservatives	2,222	6.30	-7.34
People's Movement against the EU	1,599	4.53	-5.20
The Alternative	1,361	3.86	New
Liberal Alliance	626	1.77	+0.02
Total	35,269		

2014 European Parliament election in Denmark

Parties	Vote		
Parties	Votes	%	+ / -
Danish People's Party	7,800	25.69	+11.86
Social Democrats	5,500	18.11	-5.13
Conservatives	4,142	13.64	-0.26
Green Left	4,121	13.57	-3.44
Venstre	3,791	12.48	-5.00
People's Movement against the EU	2,956	9.73	+2.10
Social Liberals	1,525	5.02	+1.57
Liberal Alliance	532	1.75	+1.33
Total	30,367		

2009 European Parliament election in Denmark

Parties	Vote		
Parties	Votes	%	+ / -
Social Democrats	7,671	23.24	-8.28
Venstre	5,770	17.48	-1.39
Green Left	5,614	17.01	+8.00
Conservatives	4,590	13.90	+3.36
Danish People's Party	4,565	13.83	+6.64
People's Movement against the EU	2,518	7.63	+1.97
Social Liberals	1,139	3.45	-2.74
June Movement	1,006	3.05	-7.33
Liberal Alliance	139	0.42	New
Total	33,012		

2004 European Parliament election in Denmark

Parties	Vote		
Parties	Votes	%	+ / -
Social Democrats	6,229	31.52	+9.07
Venstre	3,728	18.87	-1.79
Conservatives	2,082	10.54	+3.06
June Movement	2,051	10.38	-6.10
Green Left	1,781	9.01	+2.18
Danish People's Party	1,420	7.19	+1.56
Social Liberals	1,223	6.19	-2.65
People's Movement against the EU	1,118	5.66	-1.83
Christian Democrats	128	0.65	-0.72
Total	19,760		

1999 European Parliament election in Denmark

Parties	Vote		
Parties	Votes	%	+ / -
Social Democrats	4,796	22.45	+5.04
Venstre	4,413	20.66	+1.99
June Movement	3,521	16.48	+2.47
Social Liberals	1,888	8.84	-0.84
People's Movement against the EU	1,599	7.49	-5.05
Conservatives	1,597	7.48	-8.01
Green Left	1,459	6.83	-1.63
Danish People's Party	1,202	5.63	New
Centre Democrats	592	2.77	+2.12
Christian Democrats	293	1.37	+0.81
Progress Party	120	0.56	-1.98
Total	21,360		

1994 European Parliament election in Denmark

Parties	Vote		
Parties	Votes	%	+ / -
Venstre	4,123	18.67	-0.78
Social Democrats	3,845	17.41	-8.61
Conservatives	3,422	15.49	+3.98
June Movement	3,094	14.01	New
People's Movement against the EU	2,769	12.54	-4.02
Social Liberals	2,138	9.68	+6.37
Green Left	1,869	8.46	-0.79
Progress Party	561	2.54	-2.55
Centre Democrats	144	0.65	-6.59
Christian Democrats	124	0.56	-1.01
Total	22,089		

1989 European Parliament election in Denmark

Parties	Vote		
Parties	Votes	%	+ / -
Social Democrats	4,869	26.02	+4.61
Venstre	3,640	19.45	+4.36
People's Movement against the EU	3,098	16.56	-2.11
Conservatives	2,153	11.51	-9.00
Green Left	1,730	9.25	+0.89
Centre Democrats	1,354	7.24	+1.16
Progress Party	952	5.09	+2.04
Social Liberals	620	3.31	-0.61
Christian Democrats	294	1.57	-0.11
Total	18,710		

1984 European Parliament election in Denmark

Parties	Vote	
Parties	Votes	%
Social Democrats	4,539	21.41
Conservatives	4,348	20.51
People's Movement against the EU	3,959	18.67
Venstre	3,199	15.09
Green Left	1,773	8.36
Centre Democrats	1,289	6.08
Social Liberals	831	3.92
Progress Party	647	3.05
Christian Democrats	356	1.68
Left Socialists	262	1.24
Total	21,203	

== Referendums ==
2022 Danish European Union opt-out referendum

Option	Votes	%
✓ YES	23,954	65.43
X NO	12,656	34.57

2015 Danish European Union opt-out referendum

Option	Votes	%
X NO	22,266	57.70
✓ YES	16,326	42.30

2014 Danish Unified Patent Court membership referendum

Option	Votes	%
✓ YES	18,429	62.21
X NO	11,194	37.79

2009 Danish Act of Succession referendum

Option	Votes	%
✓ YES	26,455	84.58
X NO	4,823	15.42

2000 Danish euro referendum

Option	Votes	%
X NO	21,628	57.33
✓ YES	16,095	42.67

1998 Danish Amsterdam Treaty referendum

Option	Votes	%
✓ YES	17,558	52.93
X NO	15,613	47.07

1993 Danish Maastricht Treaty referendum

Option	Votes	%
✓ YES	20,070	53.88
X NO	17,179	46.12

1992 Danish Maastricht Treaty referendum

Option	Votes	%
X NO	19,772	54.11
✓ YES	16,768	45.89

1986 Danish Single European Act referendum

Option	Votes	%
✓ YES	18,181	57.65
X NO	13,358	42.35

1972 Danish European Communities membership referendum

Option	Votes	%
✓ YES	22,193	66.23
X NO	11,318	33.77

1953 Danish constitutional and electoral age referendum

Option	Votes	%
✓ YES	10,214	84.32
X NO	1,900	15.68
23 years	6,265	50.54
21 years	6,132	49.46

1939 Danish constitutional referendum

Option	Votes	%
✓ YES	6,180	89.04
X NO	761	10.96
