= Aarhus East (nomination district) =

- Aarhus Øst
- Nomination district constituency for the Folketing
- Location of Aarhus East within East Jutland

- Location of East Jutland within Denmark
- Municipalities: Aarhus
- Constituency: East Jutland
- Electorate: 81,044 (2022)

Current constituency
- Created: 1970

Aarhus East nominating district is one of the 92 nominating districts that exists for Danish elections following the 2007 municipal reform. It is one of the four nomination districts in Aarhus Municipality, the others being Aarhus South, Aarhus West and Aarhus North. It was created in 1970, with its boundaries being slightly changed in 2007.

In general elections, the district is a strong area for parties commonly associated with the red bloc.

The Danish government places the district's center at 56.265°N 10.303°E.

== General elections results ==
=== General elections in the 2020s ===
2022 Danish general election

| Parties | Vote | | |
| Parties | Votes | % | + / - |
|---|---|---|---|
| Social Democrats | 12,826 | 18.22 | -0.35 |
| Liberal Alliance | 9,330 | 13.25 | +8.85 |
| Venstre | 8,822 | 12.53 | -7.37 |
| Green Left | 7,853 | 11.15 | +0.94 |
| Moderates | 7,316 | 10.39 | New |
| Red–Green Alliance | 6,236 | 8.86 | -1.21 |
| Social Liberals | 5,622 | 7.98 | -7.49 |
| The Alternative | 4,393 | 6.24 | +0.32 |
| Conservatives | 3,690 | 5.24 | -1.55 |
| Denmark Democrats | 1,760 | 2.50 | New |
| New Right | 1,229 | 1.75 | +0.22 |
| Danish People's Party | 655 | 0.93 | -2.66 |
| Independent Greens | 397 | 0.56 | New |
| Christian Democrats | 230 | 0.33 | -1.44 |
| Jesper Antonsen | 41 | 0.06 | New |
| Chresten H. Ibsen | 8 | 0.01 | -0.07 |
| Total | 70,408 | | |

=== General elections in the 2010s ===
2019 Danish general election

| Parties | Vote | | |
| Parties | Votes | % | + / - |
|---|---|---|---|
| Venstre | 12,564 | 19.90 | +3.13 |
| Social Democrats | 11,725 | 18.57 | -4.77 |
| Social Liberals | 9,771 | 15.47 | +6.94 |
| Green Left | 6,446 | 10.21 | +5.09 |
| Red–Green Alliance | 6,359 | 10.07 | +0.58 |
| Conservatives | 4,287 | 6.79 | +3.41 |
| The Alternative | 3,739 | 5.92 | -4.70 |
| Liberal Alliance | 2,781 | 4.40 | -7.22 |
| Danish People's Party | 2,269 | 3.59 | -6.38 |
| Christian Democrats | 1,118 | 1.77 | +0.92 |
| New Right | 967 | 1.53 | New |
| Stram Kurs | 593 | 0.94 | New |
| Klaus Riskær Pedersen Party | 465 | 0.74 | New |
| Chresten H. Ibsen | 53 | 0.08 | New |
| Hans Schultz | 7 | 0.01 | New |
| Total | 63,144 | | |

2015 Danish general election

| Parties | Vote | | |
| Parties | Votes | % | + / - |
|---|---|---|---|
| Social Democrats | 13,362 | 23.34 | +1.59 |
| Venstre | 9,599 | 16.77 | -7.10 |
| Liberal Alliance | 6,650 | 11.62 | +5.37 |
| The Alternative | 6,082 | 10.62 | New |
| Danish People's Party | 5,706 | 9.97 | +3.99 |
| Red–Green Alliance | 5,432 | 9.49 | -0.24 |
| Social Liberals | 4,881 | 8.53 | -8.18 |
| Green Left | 2,932 | 5.12 | -5.44 |
| Conservatives | 1,936 | 3.38 | -1.13 |
| Christian Democrats | 486 | 0.85 | +0.25 |
| Yahya Hassan | 165 | 0.29 | New |
| Poul Gundersen | 10 | 0.02 | New |
| Peter Ymer Nielsen | 6 | 0.01 | New |
| Total | 57,247 | | |

2011 Danish general election

| Parties | Vote | | |
| Parties | Votes | % | + / - |
|---|---|---|---|
| Venstre | 13,012 | 23.87 | +2.11 |
| Social Democrats | 11,858 | 21.75 | -2.38 |
| Social Liberals | 9,110 | 16.71 | +7.28 |
| Green Left | 5,760 | 10.56 | -7.94 |
| Red–Green Alliance | 5,307 | 9.73 | +5.85 |
| Liberal Alliance | 3,410 | 6.25 | +2.43 |
| Danish People's Party | 3,262 | 5.98 | -1.16 |
| Conservatives | 2,458 | 4.51 | -6.01 |
| Christian Democrats | 329 | 0.60 | -0.20 |
| Ibrahim Gøkhan | 8 | 0.01 | New |
| Janus Kramer Møller | 6 | 0.01 | New |
| Total | 54,520 | | |

=== General elections in the 2000s ===
2007 Danish general election

| Parties | Vote | | |
| Parties | Votes | % | + / - |
|---|---|---|---|
| Social Democrats | 12,398 | 24.13 | -0.48 |
| Venstre | 11,178 | 21.76 | -1.99 |
| Green Left | 9,505 | 18.50 | +10.25 |
| Conservatives | 5,402 | 10.52 | -0.89 |
| Social Liberals | 4,846 | 9.43 | -6.63 |
| Danish People's Party | 3,666 | 7.14 | +0.16 |
| Red–Green Alliance | 1,994 | 3.88 | -1.66 |
| New Alliance | 1,964 | 3.82 | New |
| Christian Democrats | 412 | 0.80 | -0.93 |
| Jes Krogh | 6 | 0.01 | New |
| Total | 51,371 | | |

2005 Danish general election

| Parties | Vote | | |
| Parties | Votes | % | + / - |
|---|---|---|---|
| Social Democrats | 12,253 | 24.61 | -4.51 |
| Venstre | 11,829 | 23.75 | -3.79 |
| Social Liberals | 7,996 | 16.06 | +6.86 |
| Conservatives | 5,683 | 11.41 | +2.35 |
| Green Left | 4,109 | 8.25 | -0.39 |
| Danish People's Party | 3,475 | 6.98 | 0.00 |
| Red–Green Alliance | 2,761 | 5.54 | +1.41 |
| Christian Democrats | 860 | 1.73 | -0.74 |
| Centre Democrats | 612 | 1.23 | -1.26 |
| Minority Party | 206 | 0.41 | New |
| Janus Kramer Møller | 13 | 0.03 | New |
| Total | 49,797 | | |

2001 Danish general election

| Parties | Vote | | |
| Parties | Votes | % | + / - |
|---|---|---|---|
| Social Democrats | 14,427 | 29.12 | -5.52 |
| Venstre | 13,647 | 27.54 | +5.19 |
| Social Liberals | 4,556 | 9.20 | +2.82 |
| Conservatives | 4,491 | 9.06 | +0.25 |
| Green Left | 4,281 | 8.64 | -1.91 |
| Danish People's Party | 3,459 | 6.98 | +2.66 |
| Red–Green Alliance | 2,048 | 4.13 | -0.68 |
| Centre Democrats | 1,234 | 2.49 | -2.10 |
| Christian People's Party | 1,225 | 2.47 | +0.32 |
| Progress Party | 156 | 0.31 | -0.65 |
| Lars Bang | 23 | 0.05 | New |
| Total | 49,547 | | |

=== General elections in the 1990s ===
1998 Danish general election

| Parties | Vote | | |
| Parties | Votes | % | + / - |
|---|---|---|---|
| Social Democrats | 16,607 | 34.64 | +5.58 |
| Venstre | 10,714 | 22.35 | +1.58 |
| Green Left | 5,058 | 10.55 | -0.30 |
| Conservatives | 4,221 | 8.81 | -5.15 |
| Social Liberals | 3,059 | 6.38 | -0.10 |
| Red–Green Alliance | 2,304 | 4.81 | -0.11 |
| Centre Democrats | 2,201 | 4.59 | +1.92 |
| Danish People's Party | 2,070 | 4.32 | New |
| Christian People's Party | 1,033 | 2.15 | +0.37 |
| Progress Party | 462 | 0.96 | -2.72 |
| Democratic Renewal | 198 | 0.41 | New |
| John Juhler | 9 | 0.02 | New |
| Total | 47,936 | | |

1994 Danish general election

| Parties | Vote | | |
| Parties | Votes | % | + / - |
|---|---|---|---|
| Social Democrats | 13,463 | 29.06 | -0.55 |
| Venstre | 9,623 | 20.77 | +4.59 |
| Conservatives | 6,467 | 13.96 | -0.19 |
| Green Left | 5,025 | 10.85 | -4.81 |
| Social Liberals | 3,003 | 6.48 | +1.48 |
| Jacob Haugaard | 2,694 | 5.82 | +2.42 |
| Red–Green Alliance | 2,277 | 4.92 | +1.00 |
| Progress Party | 1,704 | 3.68 | -0.26 |
| Centre Democrats | 1,236 | 2.67 | -1.45 |
| Christian People's Party | 825 | 1.78 | +0.20 |
| Søren Boelskifte | 5 | 0.01 | New |
| Bjarne S. Landsfeldt | 2 | 0.00 | New |
| Total | 46,324 | | |

1990 Danish general election

| Parties | Vote | | |
| Parties | Votes | % | + / - |
|---|---|---|---|
| Social Democrats | 12,702 | 29.61 | +6.40 |
| Venstre | 6,942 | 16.18 | +5.91 |
| Green Left | 6,719 | 15.66 | -7.33 |
| Conservatives | 6,071 | 14.15 | -4.46 |
| Social Liberals | 2,146 | 5.00 | -1.81 |
| Centre Democrats | 1,767 | 4.12 | +0.29 |
| Progress Party | 1,691 | 3.94 | -1.44 |
| Red–Green Alliance | 1,683 | 3.92 | New |
| Jacob Haugaard | 1,457 | 3.40 | +1.90 |
| Christian People's Party | 676 | 1.58 | +0.29 |
| The Greens | 500 | 1.17 | -0.48 |
| Common Course | 293 | 0.68 | -0.28 |
| Justice Party of Denmark | 249 | 0.58 | New |
| Total | 42,896 | | |

=== General elections in the 1980s ===
1988 Danish general election

| Parties | Vote | | |
| Parties | Votes | % | + / - |
|---|---|---|---|
| Social Democrats | 9,806 | 23.21 | +1.84 |
| Green Left | 9,711 | 22.99 | -0.86 |
| Conservatives | 7,864 | 18.61 | -0.68 |
| Venstre | 4,338 | 10.27 | +2.02 |
| Social Liberals | 2,877 | 6.81 | -1.10 |
| Progress Party | 2,271 | 5.38 | +2.47 |
| Centre Democrats | 1,620 | 3.83 | -0.14 |
| Left Socialists | 767 | 1.82 | -3.01 |
| Communist Party of Denmark | 705 | 1.67 | +0.07 |
| The Greens | 696 | 1.65 | -0.08 |
| Jacob Haugaard | 635 | 1.50 | +0.38 |
| Christian People's Party | 545 | 1.29 | -0.24 |
| Common Course | 404 | 0.96 | +0.08 |
| Finn Mikkelsen | 6 | 0.01 | New |
| Bruno Nielsen-Boreas | 3 | 0.01 | New |
| Total | 42,248 | | |

1987 Danish general election

| Parties | Vote | | |
| Parties | Votes | % | + / - |
|---|---|---|---|
| Green Left | 9,952 | 23.85 | +4.15 |
| Social Democrats | 8,918 | 21.37 | -2.65 |
| Conservatives | 8,052 | 19.29 | -1.79 |
| Venstre | 3,441 | 8.25 | -0.80 |
| Social Liberals | 3,302 | 7.91 | +1.58 |
| Left Socialists | 2,015 | 4.83 | -4.30 |
| Centre Democrats | 1,658 | 3.97 | +0.25 |
| Progress Party | 1,216 | 2.91 | +1.09 |
| The Greens | 723 | 1.73 | New |
| Communist Party of Denmark | 667 | 1.60 | +0.44 |
| Christian People's Party | 638 | 1.53 | -0.01 |
| Jacob Haugaard | 468 | 1.12 | +0.63 |
| Common Course | 366 | 0.88 | New |
| Justice Party of Denmark | 217 | 0.52 | -1.31 |
| Humanist Party | 69 | 0.17 | New |
| Socialist Workers Party | 19 | 0.05 | -0.03 |
| Marxist–Leninists Party | 12 | 0.03 | -0.02 |
| Henning Brønd-Nielsen | 1 | 0.00 | New |
| Total | 41,734 | | |

1984 Danish general election

| Parties | Vote | | |
| Parties | Votes | % | + / - |
|---|---|---|---|
| Social Democrats | 9,553 | 24.02 | -2.18 |
| Conservatives | 8,383 | 21.08 | +7.22 |
| Green Left | 7,833 | 19.70 | -0.27 |
| Left Socialists | 3,631 | 9.13 | +0.97 |
| Venstre | 3,598 | 9.05 | +1.31 |
| Social Liberals | 2,518 | 6.33 | +1.52 |
| Centre Democrats | 1,481 | 3.72 | -4.16 |
| Justice Party of Denmark | 727 | 1.83 | +0.15 |
| Progress Party | 724 | 1.82 | -3.91 |
| Christian People's Party | 611 | 1.54 | +0.26 |
| Communist Party of Denmark | 461 | 1.16 | -0.75 |
| Jacob Haugaard | 195 | 0.49 | -0.02 |
| Socialist Workers Party | 33 | 0.08 | 0.00 |
| Marxist–Leninists Party | 20 | 0.05 | New |
| Total | 39,768 | | |

1981 Danish general election

| Parties | Vote | | |
| Parties | Votes | % | + / - |
|---|---|---|---|
| Social Democrats | 9,693 | 26.20 | -7.19 |
| Green Left | 7,387 | 19.97 | +8.21 |
| Conservatives | 5,127 | 13.86 | +0.76 |
| Left Socialists | 3,017 | 8.16 | -2.04 |
| Centre Democrats | 2,913 | 7.88 | +4.84 |
| Venstre | 2,862 | 7.74 | -0.92 |
| Progress Party | 2,121 | 5.73 | -0.47 |
| Social Liberals | 1,779 | 4.81 | -0.35 |
| Communist Party of Denmark | 705 | 1.91 | -0.97 |
| Justice Party of Denmark | 623 | 1.68 | -1.08 |
| Christian People's Party | 472 | 1.28 | -0.18 |
| Jacob Haugaard | 190 | 0.51 | -0.17 |
| Communist Workers Party | 69 | 0.19 | -0.52 |
| Socialist Workers Party | 31 | 0.08 | New |
| Henrik Christensen | 1 | 0.00 | New |
| Lars Michaelsen | 0 | 0.00 | New |
| Total | 36,990 | | |

=== General elections in the 1970s ===
1979 Danish general election

| Parties | Vote | | |
| Parties | Votes | % | + / - |
|---|---|---|---|
| Social Democrats | 12,403 | 33.39 | -2.48 |
| Conservatives | 4,865 | 13.10 | +4.45 |
| Green Left | 4,367 | 11.76 | +3.84 |
| Left Socialists | 3,789 | 10.20 | +1.83 |
| Venstre | 3,216 | 8.66 | +0.74 |
| Progress Party | 2,303 | 6.20 | -4.03 |
| Social Liberals | 1,916 | 5.16 | +2.23 |
| Centre Democrats | 1,129 | 3.04 | -3.14 |
| Communist Party of Denmark | 1,071 | 2.88 | -2.63 |
| Justice Party of Denmark | 1,027 | 2.76 | -0.69 |
| Christian People's Party | 544 | 1.46 | -0.76 |
| Communist Workers Party | 264 | 0.71 | New |
| Jacob Haugaard | 254 | 0.68 | New |
| Total | 37,148 | | |

1977 Danish general election

| Parties | Vote | | |
| Parties | Votes | % | + / - |
|---|---|---|---|
| Social Democrats | 13,201 | 35.87 | +5.67 |
| Progress Party | 3,765 | 10.23 | -0.05 |
| Conservatives | 3,185 | 8.65 | +3.00 |
| Left Socialists | 3,080 | 8.37 | +2.86 |
| Venstre | 2,916 | 7.92 | -10.96 |
| Green Left | 2,915 | 7.92 | +0.18 |
| Centre Democrats | 2,276 | 6.18 | +4.01 |
| Communist Party of Denmark | 2,029 | 5.51 | -0.62 |
| Justice Party of Denmark | 1,269 | 3.45 | +1.04 |
| Social Liberals | 1,080 | 2.93 | -3.64 |
| Christian People's Party | 818 | 2.22 | -2.22 |
| Pensioners' Party | 260 | 0.71 | New |
| Tommy Nielsen | 7 | 0.02 | New |
| Total | 36,801 | | |

1975 Danish general election

| Parties | Vote | | |
| Parties | Votes | % | + / - |
|---|---|---|---|
| Social Democrats | 10,949 | 30.20 | +3.92 |
| Venstre | 6,845 | 18.88 | +10.65 |
| Progress Party | 3,727 | 10.28 | -3.28 |
| Green Left | 2,807 | 7.74 | -1.29 |
| Social Liberals | 2,382 | 6.57 | -3.21 |
| Communist Party of Denmark | 2,223 | 6.13 | -0.31 |
| Conservatives | 2,047 | 5.65 | -4.50 |
| Left Socialists | 1,996 | 5.51 | +2.53 |
| Christian People's Party | 1,611 | 4.44 | +1.45 |
| Justice Party of Denmark | 874 | 2.41 | -1.72 |
| Centre Democrats | 786 | 2.17 | -4.22 |
| Elmer Mariager | 6 | 0.02 | New |
| Total | 36,253 | | |

1973 Danish general election

| Parties | Vote | | |
| Parties | Votes | % | + / - |
|---|---|---|---|
| Social Democrats | 9,680 | 26.28 | -12.26 |
| Progress Party | 4,995 | 13.56 | New |
| Conservatives | 3,738 | 10.15 | -8.10 |
| Social Liberals | 3,604 | 9.78 | -3.26 |
| Green Left | 3,325 | 9.03 | -2.68 |
| Venstre | 3,030 | 8.23 | -1.81 |
| Communist Party of Denmark | 2,371 | 6.44 | +4.59 |
| Centre Democrats | 2,354 | 6.39 | New |
| Justice Party of Denmark | 1,521 | 4.13 | +2.31 |
| Christian People's Party | 1,103 | 2.99 | +1.55 |
| Left Socialists | 1,099 | 2.98 | -0.34 |
| John Bove | 18 | 0.05 | New |
| Total | 36,838 | | |

1971 Danish general election

| Parties | Vote | | |
| Parties | Votes | % | + / - |
|---|---|---|---|
| Social Democrats | 13,618 | 38.54 | |
| Conservatives | 6,450 | 18.25 | |
| Social Liberals | 4,607 | 13.04 | |
| Green Left | 4,138 | 11.71 | |
| Venstre | 3,549 | 10.04 | |
| Left Socialists | 1,172 | 3.32 | |
| Communist Party of Denmark | 652 | 1.85 | |
| Justice Party of Denmark | 642 | 1.82 | |
| Christian People's Party | 509 | 1.44 | |
| Total | 35,337 | | |

== European Parliament elections results ==
2024 European Parliament election in Denmark

| Parties | Vote | | |
| Parties | Votes | % | + / - |
|---|---|---|---|
| Green Left | 13,049 | 23.83 | +4.70 |
| Social Liberals | 6,632 | 12.11 | -3.26 |
| Venstre | 6,140 | 11.21 | -7.74 |
| Social Democrats | 5,980 | 10.92 | -5.86 |
| Red–Green Alliance | 5,124 | 9.36 | +2.5 |
| Conservatives | 5,100 | 9.31 | +3.21 |
| Liberal Alliance | 4,488 | 8.19 | +5.16 |
| Moderates | 3,044 | 5.56 | New |
| The Alternative | 2,544 | 4.64 | -2.11 |
| Danish People's Party | 1,493 | 2.73 | -1.96 |
| Denmark Democrats | 1,176 | 2.15 | New |
| Total | 54,770 | | |

2019 European Parliament election in Denmark

| Parties | Vote | | |
| Parties | Votes | % | + / - |
|---|---|---|---|
| Green Left | 10,063 | 19.13 | +1.01 |
| Venstre | 9,967 | 18.95 | +3.69 |
| Social Democrats | 8,827 | 16.78 | -2.68 |
| Social Liberals | 8,084 | 15.37 | +3.93 |
| Red–Green Alliance | 3,607 | 6.86 | New |
| The Alternative | 3,548 | 6.75 | New |
| Conservatives | 3,206 | 6.10 | -1.37 |
| Danish People's Party | 2,468 | 4.69 | -10.44 |
| Liberal Alliance | 1,592 | 3.03 | -1.27 |
| People's Movement against the EU | 1,237 | 2.35 | -6.47 |
| Total | 52,599 | | |

2014 European Parliament election in Denmark

| Parties | Vote | | |
| Parties | Votes | % | + / - |
|---|---|---|---|
| Social Democrats | 7,313 | 19.46 | -3.90 |
| Green Left | 6,812 | 18.12 | -4.60 |
| Venstre | 5,737 | 15.26 | -1.68 |
| Danish People's Party | 5,689 | 15.13 | +5.69 |
| Social Liberals | 4,299 | 11.44 | +5.05 |
| People's Movement against the EU | 3,315 | 8.82 | +1.47 |
| Conservatives | 2,809 | 7.47 | -2.62 |
| Liberal Alliance | 1,615 | 4.30 | +3.25 |
| Total | 37,589 | | |

2009 European Parliament election in Denmark

| Parties | Vote | | |
| Parties | Votes | % | + / - |
|---|---|---|---|
| Social Democrats | 8,822 | 23.36 | -5.73 |
| Green Left | 8,581 | 22.72 | +9.18 |
| Venstre | 6,400 | 16.94 | +2.28 |
| Conservatives | 3,810 | 10.09 | -0.60 |
| Danish People's Party | 3,566 | 9.44 | +5.31 |
| People's Movement against the EU | 2,778 | 7.35 | +2.20 |
| Social Liberals | 2,412 | 6.39 | -5.62 |
| June Movement | 1,008 | 2.67 | -6.99 |
| Liberal Alliance | 396 | 1.05 | New |
| Total | 37,773 | | |

2004 European Parliament election in Denmark

| Parties | Vote | | |
| Parties | Votes | % | + / - |
|---|---|---|---|
| Social Democrats | 8,746 | 29.09 | +15.21 |
| Venstre | 4,407 | 14.66 | -5.64 |
| Green Left | 4,070 | 13.54 | +3.10 |
| Social Liberals | 3,611 | 12.01 | -1.44 |
| Conservatives | 3,214 | 10.69 | +2.77 |
| June Movement | 2,906 | 9.66 | -7.93 |
| People's Movement against the EU | 1,549 | 5.15 | -2.11 |
| Danish People's Party | 1,241 | 4.13 | +0.43 |
| Christian Democrats | 326 | 1.08 | -0.49 |
| Total | 30,070 | | |

1999 European Parliament election in Denmark

| Parties | Vote | | |
| Parties | Votes | % | + / - |
|---|---|---|---|
| Venstre | 6,196 | 20.30 | +6.12 |
| June Movement | 5,370 | 17.59 | -2.97 |
| Social Democrats | 4,237 | 13.88 | +3.94 |
| Social Liberals | 4,105 | 13.45 | +3.61 |
| Green Left | 3,186 | 10.44 | -3.04 |
| Conservatives | 2,418 | 7.92 | -9.61 |
| People's Movement against the EU | 2,216 | 7.26 | -3.76 |
| Centre Democrats | 1,187 | 3.89 | +3.17 |
| Danish People's Party | 1,129 | 3.70 | New |
| Christian Democrats | 480 | 1.57 | +0.81 |
| Progress Party | 110 | 0.36 | -1.61 |
| Total | 30,524 | | |

1994 European Parliament election in Denmark

| Parties | Vote | | |
| Parties | Votes | % | + / - |
|---|---|---|---|
| June Movement | 6,485 | 20.56 | New |
| Conservatives | 5,528 | 17.53 | +4.52 |
| Venstre | 4,471 | 14.18 | +3.48 |
| Green Left | 4,252 | 13.48 | -2.58 |
| People's Movement against the EU | 3,477 | 11.02 | -17.21 |
| Social Democrats | 3,134 | 9.94 | -6.23 |
| Social Liberals | 3,104 | 9.84 | +6.02 |
| Progress Party | 620 | 1.97 | -1.53 |
| Christian Democrats | 241 | 0.76 | -1.08 |
| Centre Democrats | 226 | 0.72 | -5.95 |
| Total | 31,538 | | |

1989 European Parliament election in Denmark

| Parties | Vote | | |
| Parties | Votes | % | + / - |
|---|---|---|---|
| People's Movement against the EU | 6,982 | 28.23 | -1.64 |
| Social Democrats | 4,000 | 16.17 | +3.13 |
| Green Left | 3,972 | 16.06 | +0.97 |
| Conservatives | 3,219 | 13.01 | -6.85 |
| Venstre | 2,647 | 10.70 | +4.64 |
| Centre Democrats | 1,651 | 6.67 | +1.15 |
| Social Liberals | 944 | 3.82 | +1.05 |
| Progress Party | 866 | 3.50 | +1.04 |
| Christian Democrats | 454 | 1.84 | +0.72 |
| Total | 24,735 | | |

1984 European Parliament election in Denmark

| Parties | Vote | |
| Parties | Votes | % |
|---|---|---|
| People's Movement against the EU | 7,593 | 29.87 |
| Conservatives | 5,047 | 19.86 |
| Green Left | 3,836 | 15.09 |
| Social Democrats | 3,315 | 13.04 |
| Venstre | 1,540 | 6.06 |
| Centre Democrats | 1,402 | 5.52 |
| Left Socialists | 1,070 | 4.21 |
| Social Liberals | 703 | 2.77 |
| Progress Party | 626 | 2.46 |
| Christian Democrats | 285 | 1.12 |
| Total | 25,417 | |

== Referendums ==
2022 Danish European Union opt-out referendum

| Option | Votes | % |
|---|---|---|
| ✓ YES | 40,275 | 76.95 |
| X NO | 12,063 | 23.05 |

2015 Danish European Union opt-out referendum

| Option | Votes | % |
|---|---|---|
| ✓ YES | 26,734 | 56.83 |
| X NO | 20,307 | 43.17 |

2014 Danish Unified Patent Court membership referendum

| Option | Votes | % |
|---|---|---|
| ✓ YES | 23,709 | 64.98 |
| X NO | 12,776 | 35.02 |

2009 Danish Act of Succession referendum

| Option | Votes | % |
|---|---|---|
| ✓ YES | 28,958 | 87.71 |
| X NO | 4,059 | 12.29 |

2000 Danish euro referendum

| Option | Votes | % |
|---|---|---|
| ✓ YES | 26,977 | 55.51 |
| X NO | 21,622 | 44.49 |

1998 Danish Amsterdam Treaty referendum

| Option | Votes | % |
|---|---|---|
| ✓ YES | 25,571 | 59.95 |
| X NO | 17,084 | 40.05 |

1993 Danish Maastricht Treaty referendum

| Option | Votes | % |
|---|---|---|
| ✓ YES | 25,743 | 55.67 |
| X NO | 20,501 | 44.33 |

1992 Danish Maastricht Treaty referendum

| Option | Votes | % |
|---|---|---|
| X NO | 23,415 | 52.80 |
| ✓ YES | 20,928 | 47.20 |

1986 Danish Single European Act referendum

| Option | Votes | % |
|---|---|---|
| X NO | 19,053 | 53.69 |
| ✓ YES | 16,434 | 46.31 |

1972 Danish European Communities membership referendum

| Option | Votes | % |
|---|---|---|
| ✓ YES | 20,566 | 54.08 |
| X NO | 17,460 | 45.92 |
