= Aarhus North (nomination district) =

- Aarhus Nord
- Nomination district constituency for the Folketing
- Location of Aarhus North within East Jutland

- Location of East Jutland within Denmark
- Municipalities: Aarhus
- Constituency: East Jutland
- Electorate: 63,318 (2022)

Current constituency
- Created: 1895 (as constituency); 1920 (as nomination district)

Aarhus North nominating district is one of the 92 nominating districts that exists for Danish elections following the 2007 municipal reform. It is one of the four nomination districts in Aarhus Municipality, the others being Aarhus South, Aarhus West and

Aarhus East. It was established as a constituency in 1895 as Aarhus County 2, became Aarhus County 3 in 1915, and became a nomination district in 1920. It obtained its current configuration and name in 1970, with the boundaries being slightly modified in 2007.

In general elections, the district is a very strong area for parties commonly associated with the red bloc, and was the district where they received their highest vote share outside the Copenhagen constituency in the 2022 Danish general election.

== General elections results ==
=== General elections in the 2020s ===
2022 Danish general election

Parties	Vote		
Parties	Votes	%	+ / -
Social Democrats	11,808	22.32	-0.56
Green Left	6,801	12.85	+1.85
Red–Green Alliance	5,310	10.04	-0.96
Venstre	5,217	9.86	-5.71
Liberal Alliance	5,127	9.69	+6.35
Moderates	4,382	8.28	New
Social Liberals	4,212	7.96	-7.24
The Alternative	3,273	6.19	+0.75
Conservatives	2,206	4.17	-0.82
Denmark Democrats	1,654	3.13	New
New Right	1,048	1.98	+0.46
Independent Greens	851	1.61	New
Danish People's Party	623	1.18	-3.12
Christian Democrats	330	0.62	-1.99
Jesper Antonsen	48	0.09	New
Chresten H. Ibsen	16	0.03	-0.10
Total	52,906		

=== General elections in the 2010s ===
2019 Danish general election

Parties	Vote		
Parties	Votes	%	+ / -
Social Democrats	12,408	22.88	-4.52
Venstre	8,446	15.57	+1.88
Social Liberals	8,245	15.20	+7.37
Green Left	5,968	11.00	+5.19
Red–Green Alliance	5,963	11.00	+0.06
The Alternative	2,948	5.44	-3.78
Conservatives	2,705	4.99	+2.36
Danish People's Party	2,332	4.30	-7.39
Liberal Alliance	1,811	3.34	-5.44
Christian Democrats	1,415	2.61	+1.00
New Right	827	1.52	New
Stram Kurs	666	1.23	New
Klaus Riskær Pedersen Party	418	0.77	New
Chresten H. Ibsen	70	0.13	New
Hans Schultz	10	0.02	New
Total	54,232		

2015 Danish general election

Parties	Vote		
Parties	Votes	%	+ / -
Social Democrats	14,067	27.40	+0.07
Venstre	7,028	13.69	-5.28
Danish People's Party	6,000	11.69	+4.28
Red–Green Alliance	5,615	10.94	+1.04
The Alternative	4,732	9.22	New
Liberal Alliance	4,507	8.78	+3.59
Social Liberals	4,018	7.83	-6.98
Green Left	2,982	5.81	-6.04
Conservatives	1,350	2.63	-0.95
Christian Democrats	826	1.61	+0.73
Yahya Hassan	199	0.39	New
Peter Ymer Nielsen	8	0.02	New
Poul Gundersen	7	0.01	New
Total	51,339		

2011 Danish general election

Parties	Vote		
Parties	Votes	%	+ / -
Social Democrats	13,960	27.33	-2.16
Venstre	9,689	18.97	+1.54
Social Liberals	7,568	14.81	+6.90
Green Left	6,056	11.85	-7.60
Red–Green Alliance	5,057	9.90	+6.09
Danish People's Party	3,785	7.41	-1.77
Liberal Alliance	2,651	5.19	+1.78
Conservatives	1,831	3.58	-4.43
Christian Democrats	451	0.88	-0.39
Ibrahim Gøkhan	27	0.05	New
Janus Kramer Møller	13	0.03	New
Total	51,088		

=== General elections in the 2000s ===
2007 Danish general election

Parties	Vote		
Parties	Votes	%	+ / -
Social Democrats	14,197	29.49	-2.75
Green Left	9,365	19.45	+11.13
Venstre	8,390	17.43	-2.11
Danish People's Party	4,418	9.18	+0.26
Conservatives	3,854	8.01	-0.63
Social Liberals	3,809	7.91	-5.53
Red–Green Alliance	1,836	3.81	-1.24
New Alliance	1,643	3.41	New
Christian Democrats	611	1.27	-0.93
Jes Krogh	15	0.03	New
Total	48,138		

2005 Danish general election

Parties	Vote		
Parties	Votes	%	+ / -
Social Democrats	12,639	32.24	-3.47
Venstre	7,661	19.54	-4.27
Social Liberals	5,267	13.44	+6.01
Danish People's Party	3,498	8.92	-0.02
Conservatives	3,387	8.64	+1.97
Green Left	3,260	8.32	-0.12
Red–Green Alliance	1,978	5.05	+1.35
Christian Democrats	861	2.20	-0.39
Centre Democrats	489	1.25	-1.00
Minority Party	148	0.38	New
Janus Kramer Møller	13	0.03	New
Total	39,201		

2001 Danish general election

Parties	Vote		
Parties	Votes	%	+ / -
Social Democrats	14,310	35.71	-6.72
Venstre	9,540	23.81	+5.45
Danish People's Party	3,584	8.94	+3.50
Green Left	3,383	8.44	-1.56
Social Liberals	2,976	7.43	+2.32
Conservatives	2,673	6.67	+0.16
Red–Green Alliance	1,483	3.70	-0.55
Christian People's Party	1,039	2.59	+0.26
Centre Democrats	900	2.25	-1.76
Progress Party	177	0.44	-0.69
Lars Bang	5	0.01	New
Total	40,070		

=== General elections in the 1990s ===
1998 Danish general election

Parties	Vote		
Parties	Votes	%	+ / -
Social Democrats	16,222	42.43	+4.22
Venstre	7,021	18.36	+1.19
Green Left	3,825	10.00	+0.26
Conservatives	2,487	6.51	-3.94
Danish People's Party	2,078	5.44	New
Social Liberals	1,954	5.11	+0.05
Red–Green Alliance	1,625	4.25	+0.09
Centre Democrats	1,532	4.01	+1.56
Christian People's Party	892	2.33	+0.24
Progress Party	433	1.13	-3.15
Democratic Renewal	151	0.39	New
John Juhler	12	0.03	New
Total	38,232		

1994 Danish general election

Parties	Vote		
Parties	Votes	%	+ / -
Social Democrats	14,450	38.21	-4.27
Venstre	6,494	17.17	+5.09
Conservatives	3,954	10.45	+0.48
Green Left	3,682	9.74	-3.93
Jacob Haugaard	2,396	6.34	+3.71
Social Liberals	1,913	5.06	+1.22
Progress Party	1,619	4.28	+0.06
Red–Green Alliance	1,573	4.16	+1.22
Centre Democrats	926	2.45	-1.15
Christian People's Party	792	2.09	+0.17
Søren Boelskifte	19	0.05	New
Bjarne S. Landsfeldt	2	0.01	New
Total	37,820		

1990 Danish general election

Parties	Vote		
Parties	Votes	%	+ / -
Social Democrats	15,475	42.48	+7.04
Green Left	4,980	13.67	-6.84
Venstre	4,402	12.08	+4.08
Conservatives	3,633	9.97	-3.43
Progress Party	1,536	4.22	-1.26
Social Liberals	1,400	3.84	-1.54
Centre Democrats	1,310	3.60	+0.36
Red–Green Alliance	1,070	2.94	New
Jacob Haugaard	959	2.63	+1.62
Christian People's Party	698	1.92	+0.18
The Greens	381	1.05	-0.27
Common Course	358	0.98	-0.51
Justice Party of Denmark	225	0.62	New
Total	36,427		

=== General elections in the 1980s ===
1988 Danish general election

Parties	Vote		
Parties	Votes	%	+ / -
Social Democrats	13,204	35.44	+2.04
Green Left	7,640	20.51	-2.26
Conservatives	4,992	13.40	-0.48
Venstre	2,982	8.00	+1.58
Progress Party	2,042	5.48	+2.60
Social Liberals	2,005	5.38	-0.96
Centre Democrats	1,206	3.24	+0.13
Communist Party of Denmark	688	1.85	+0.15
Christian People's Party	648	1.74	-0.16
Common Course	554	1.49	-0.47
The Greens	491	1.32	+0.05
Left Socialists	428	1.15	-1.74
Jacob Haugaard	376	1.01	+0.34
Finn Mikkelsen	2	0.01	New
Bruno Nielsen-Boreas	0	0.00	New
Total	37,258		

1987 Danish general election

Parties	Vote		
Parties	Votes	%	+ / -
Social Democrats	12,535	33.40	-3.05
Green Left	8,546	22.77	+2.66
Conservatives	5,209	13.88	-1.50
Venstre	2,409	6.42	-0.81
Social Liberals	2,379	6.34	+1.16
Centre Democrats	1,166	3.11	+0.26
Left Socialists	1,086	2.89	-2.93
Progress Party	1,080	2.88	+1.29
Common Course	734	1.96	New
Christian People's Party	714	1.90	+0.04
Communist Party of Denmark	637	1.70	+0.23
The Greens	476	1.27	New
Jacob Haugaard	251	0.67	+0.35
Justice Party of Denmark	220	0.59	-1.01
Humanist Party	49	0.13	New
Socialist Workers Party	25	0.07	-0.02
Marxist–Leninists Party	15	0.04	0.00
Henning Brønd-Nielsen	1	0.00	New
Total	37,532		

1984 Danish general election

Parties	Vote		
Parties	Votes	%	+ / -
Social Democrats	13,827	36.45	-2.02
Green Left	7,630	20.11	+0.08
Conservatives	5,835	15.38	+6.28
Venstre	2,744	7.23	+0.90
Left Socialists	2,207	5.82	+0.88
Social Liberals	1,964	5.18	+0.77
Centre Democrats	1,081	2.85	-3.26
Christian People's Party	707	1.86	+0.08
Justice Party of Denmark	608	1.60	+0.08
Progress Party	602	1.59	-2.96
Communist Party of Denmark	558	1.47	-0.88
Jacob Haugaard	120	0.32	+0.10
Socialist Workers Party	34	0.09	0.00
Marxist–Leninists Party	16	0.04	New
Total	37,933		

1981 Danish general election

Parties	Vote		
Parties	Votes	%	+ / -
Social Democrats	13,653	38.47	-8.13
Green Left	7,108	20.03	+8.27
Conservatives	3,228	9.10	+0.86
Venstre	2,247	6.33	-0.40
Centre Democrats	2,170	6.11	+4.22
Left Socialists	1,754	4.94	-1.65
Progress Party	1,615	4.55	-0.32
Social Liberals	1,565	4.41	-0.21
Communist Party of Denmark	833	2.35	-1.05
Christian People's Party	632	1.78	+0.07
Justice Party of Denmark	538	1.52	-1.37
Jacob Haugaard	77	0.22	-0.02
Communist Workers Party	35	0.10	-0.36
Socialist Workers Party	33	0.09	New
Lars Michaelsen	2	0.01	New
Henrik Christensen	0	0.00	New
Total	35,490		

=== General elections in the 1970s ===
1979 Danish general election

Parties	Vote		
Parties	Votes	%	+ / -
Social Democrats	16,780	46.60	-0.86
Green Left	4,236	11.76	+4.21
Conservatives	2,969	8.24	+2.69
Venstre	2,425	6.73	+0.48
Left Socialists	2,374	6.59	+0.73
Progress Party	1,753	4.87	-2.46
Social Liberals	1,662	4.62	+2.04
Communist Party of Denmark	1,224	3.40	-3.09
Justice Party of Denmark	1,041	2.89	-0.75
Centre Democrats	679	1.89	-2.22
Christian People's Party	617	1.71	-0.57
Communist Workers Party	165	0.46	New
Jacob Haugaard	86	0.24	New
Total	36,011		

1977 Danish general election

Parties	Vote		
Parties	Votes	%	+ / -
Social Democrats	16,971	47.46	+6.85
Green Left	2,700	7.55	-1.20
Progress Party	2,622	7.33	-0.28
Communist Party of Denmark	2,321	6.49	-0.76
Venstre	2,235	6.25	-7.59
Left Socialists	2,096	5.86	+1.53
Conservatives	1,986	5.55	+1.92
Centre Democrats	1,468	4.11	+2.50
Justice Party of Denmark	1,300	3.64	+1.25
Social Liberals	922	2.58	-3.07
Christian People's Party	814	2.28	-2.03
Pensioners' Party	317	0.89	New
Tommy Nielsen	6	0.02	New
Total	35,758		

1975 Danish general election

Parties	Vote		
Parties	Votes	%	+ / -
Social Democrats	14,306	40.61	+4.82
Venstre	4,875	13.84	+7.35
Green Left	3,081	8.75	-1.88
Progress Party	2,681	7.61	-2.22
Communist Party of Denmark	2,554	7.25	+0.26
Social Liberals	1,989	5.65	-2.71
Left Socialists	1,524	4.33	+1.88
Christian People's Party	1,519	4.31	+1.33
Conservatives	1,279	3.63	-3.41
Justice Party of Denmark	843	2.39	-1.58
Centre Democrats	567	1.61	-3.82
Elmer Mariager	7	0.02	New
Total	35,225		

1973 Danish general election

Parties	Vote		
Parties	Votes	%	+ / -
Social Democrats	12,762	35.79	-11.68
Green Left	3,791	10.63	-3.24
Progress Party	3,507	9.83	New
Social Liberals	2,981	8.36	-2.63
Conservatives	2,509	7.04	-4.58
Communist Party of Denmark	2,492	6.99	+4.86
Venstre	2,315	6.49	-1.49
Centre Democrats	1,936	5.43	New
Justice Party of Denmark	1,416	3.97	+2.22
Christian People's Party	1,064	2.98	+1.62
Left Socialists	872	2.45	-0.37
John Bove	15	0.04	New
Total	35,660		

1971 Danish general election

Parties	Vote		
Parties	Votes	%	+ / -
Social Democrats	16,325	47.47	+2.15
Green Left	4,769	13.87	+2.69
Conservatives	3,997	11.62	-6.50
Social Liberals	3,781	10.99	-1.86
Venstre	2,744	7.98	+2.44
Left Socialists	971	2.82	+0.33
Communist Party of Denmark	734	2.13	+0.33
Justice Party of Denmark	602	1.75	+1.16
Christian People's Party	466	1.36	New
Total	34,389		

=== General elections in the 1960s ===
1968 Danish general election

Parties	Vote		
Parties	Votes	%	+ / -
Social Democrats	18,657	45.32	-2.47
Conservatives	7,457	18.12	+0.48
Social Liberals	5,291	12.85	+7.83
Green Left	4,604	11.18	-6.44
Venstre	2,280	5.54	-0.26
Left Socialists	1,023	2.49	New
Communist Party of Denmark	742	1.80	+0.50
Liberal Centre	723	1.76	-1.59
Justice Party of Denmark	241	0.59	+0.10
Independent Party	145	0.35	-0.64
Total	41,163		

1966 Danish general election

Parties	Vote		
Parties	Votes	%	+ / -
Social Democrats	19,656	47.79	-6.33
Conservatives	7,253	17.64	-2.86
Green Left	7,245	17.62	+8.10
Venstre	2,387	5.80	-0.90
Social Liberals	2,066	5.02	+2.70
Liberal Centre	1,378	3.35	New
Communist Party of Denmark	533	1.30	-1.25
Independent Party	407	0.99	-0.97
Justice Party of Denmark	203	0.49	-0.53
Total	41,128		

1964 Danish general election

Parties	Vote		
Parties	Votes	%	+ / -
Social Democrats	21,616	54.12	-2.44
Conservatives	8,189	20.50	+0.45
Green Left	3,802	9.52	+0.11
Venstre	2,675	6.70	+1.84
Communist Party of Denmark	1,020	2.55	+0.45
Social Liberals	928	2.32	+0.16
Independent Party	782	1.96	-1.01
Justice Party of Denmark	409	1.02	-0.87
Danish Unity	261	0.65	New
Peace Politics People's Party	259	0.65	New
Total	39,941		

1960 Danish general election

Parties	Vote		
Parties	Votes	%	+ / -
Social Democrats	21,001	56.56	+1.02
Conservatives	7,443	20.05	+1.06
Green Left	3,495	9.41	New
Venstre	1,803	4.86	-1.84
Independent Party	1,104	2.97	-0.51
Social Liberals	802	2.16	-2.05
Communist Party of Denmark	780	2.10	-3.52
Justice Party of Denmark	702	1.89	-3.57
Total	37,130		

=== General elections in the 1950s ===
1957 Danish general election

Parties	Vote		
Parties	Votes	%	+ / -
Social Democrats	19,346	55.54	-1.67
Conservatives	6,615	18.99	-0.75
Venstre	2,332	6.70	+1.49
Communist Party of Denmark	1,957	5.62	-2.49
Justice Party of Denmark	1,902	5.46	+2.38
Social Liberals	1,467	4.21	+0.86
Independent Party	1,212	3.48	+0.18
Total	34,831		

September 1953 Danish Folketing election

Parties	Vote		
Parties	Votes	%	+ / -
Social Democrats	18,655	57.21	+2.59
Conservatives	6,437	19.74	-1.68
Communist Party of Denmark	2,646	8.11	-0.43
Venstre	1,700	5.21	+0.68
Social Liberals	1,091	3.35	-0.91
Independent Party	1,077	3.30	New
Justice Party of Denmark	1,003	3.08	-1.66
Total	32,609		

April 1953 Danish Folketing election

Parties	Vote		
Parties	Votes	%	+ / -
Social Democrats	16,708	54.62	-0.52
Conservatives	6,551	21.42	-1.45
Communist Party of Denmark	2,613	8.54	+0.38
Justice Party of Denmark	1,450	4.74	-2.61
Venstre	1,386	4.53	+1.22
Social Liberals	1,303	4.26	+1.09
Danish Unity	577	1.89	New
Total	30,588		

1950 Danish Folketing election

Parties	Vote		
Parties	Votes	%	+ / -
Social Democrats	16,078	55.14	+0.93
Conservatives	6,669	22.87	+5.64
Communist Party of Denmark	2,379	8.16	-3.84
Justice Party of Denmark	2,142	7.35	+1.97
Venstre	966	3.31	-3.76
Social Liberals	923	3.17	+0.67
Total	29,157		

=== General elections in the 1940s ===
1947 Danish Folketing election

Parties	Vote		
Parties	Votes	%	+ / -
Social Democrats	15,105	54.21	+10.95
Conservatives	4,801	17.23	-5.87
Communist Party of Denmark	3,343	12.00	-10.25
Venstre	1,970	7.07	+2.33
Justice Party of Denmark	1,498	5.38	+3.86
Social Liberals	697	2.50	+0.83
Danish Unity	450	1.61	-1.85
Total	27,864		

1945 Danish Folketing election

Parties	Vote		
Parties	Votes	%	+ / -
Social Democrats	11,861	43.26	-20.48
Conservatives	6,334	23.10	-4.18
Communist Party of Denmark	6,101	22.25	New
Venstre	1,300	4.74	+2.50
Danish Unity	948	3.46	+2.20
Social Liberals	457	1.67	-0.21
Justice Party of Denmark	418	1.52	+0.37
Total	27,419		

1943 Danish Folketing election

Parties	Vote		
Parties	Votes	%	+ / -
Social Democrats	16,238	63.74	+8.15
Conservatives	6,950	27.28	-2.54
National Socialist Workers' Party of Denmark	606	2.38	+0.97
Venstre	571	2.24	+1.23
Social Liberals	478	1.88	0.00
Danish Unity	322	1.26	+0.92
Justice Party of Denmark	294	1.15	+0.08
Farmers' Party	17	0.07	-0.14
Total	25,476		

=== General elections in the 1930s ===
1939 Danish Folketing election

Parties	Vote		
Parties	Votes	%	+ / -
Social Democrats	11,924	55.59	-11.33
Conservatives	6,397	29.82	+6.25
Communist Party of Denmark	1,528	7.12	+3.45
Social Liberals	404	1.88	+0.12
National Cooperation	334	1.56	New
National Socialist Workers' Party of Denmark	302	1.41	+0.29
Justice Party of Denmark	229	1.07	-0.81
Venstre	217	1.01	+0.15
Danish Unity	72	0.34	New
Farmers' Party	44	0.21	-0.01
Total	21,451		

1935 Danish Folketing election

Parties	Vote		
Parties	Votes	%	+ / -
Social Democrats	12,362	66.92	-0.59
Conservatives	4,354	23.57	-1.45
Communist Party of Denmark	678	3.67	+1.70
Justice Party of Denmark	347	1.88	-0.40
Social Liberals	326	1.76	+0.08
National Socialist Workers' Party of Denmark	206	1.12	New
Venstre	159	0.86	-0.68
Independent People's Party	40	0.22	New
Total	18,472		

1932 Danish Folketing election

Parties	Vote		
Parties	Votes	%	+ / -
Social Democrats	10,794	67.51	-1.70
Conservatives	4,001	25.02	+1.56
Justice Party of Denmark	365	2.28	-0.04
Communist Party of Denmark	315	1.97	+1.25
Social Liberals	268	1.68	-0.14
Venstre	246	1.54	-0.93
Total	15,989		

=== General elections in the 1920s ===
1929 Danish Folketing election

Parties	Vote		
Parties	Votes	%	+ / -
Social Democrats	9,330	69.21	+5.10
Conservatives	3,163	23.46	-5.66
Venstre	333	2.47	+0.37
Justice Party of Denmark	313	2.32	+0.18
Social Liberals	245	1.82	+0.32
Total	13,481		

1926 Danish Folketing election

Parties	Vote		
Parties	Votes	%	+ / -
Social Democrats	8,114	64.11	+1.96
Conservatives	3,685	29.12	-0.60
Justice Party of Denmark	271	2.14	-0.05
Venstre	266	2.10	-0.36
Social Liberals	190	1.50	-0.45
Communist Party of Denmark	130	1.03	-0.45
Total	12,656		

1924 Danish Folketing election

Parties	Vote		
Parties	Votes	%	+ / -
Social Democrats	7,412	62.15	-0.45
Conservatives	3,545	29.72	+2.71
Venstre	293	2.46	-1.43
Justice Party of Denmark	261	2.19	New
Social Liberals	232	1.95	-0.58
Communist Party of Denmark	176	1.48	New
Farmer Party	7	0.06	New
Total	11,926		

September 1920 Danish Folketing election

Parties	Vote		
Parties	Votes	%	+ / -
Social Democrats	6,483	62.60	+2.01
Conservatives	2,797	27.01	-2.10
Venstre	403	3.89	-0.71
Industry Party	338	3.26	+0.83
Social Liberals	262	2.53	-0.35
Danish Left Socialist Party	73	0.70	New
Total	10,356		

July 1920 Danish Folketing election

Parties	Vote		
Parties	Votes	%	+ / -
Social Democrats	5,284	60.59	+1.62
Conservatives	2,539	29.11	-0.76
Venstre	401	4.60	+0.62
Social Liberals	251	2.88	-0.23
Industry Party	212	2.43	-1.64
C. V. Christensen	34	0.39	New
Total	8,721		

April 1920 Danish Folketing election

Parties	Vote	
Parties	Votes	%
Social Democrats	5,520	58.97
Conservatives	2,796	29.87
Industry Party	381	4.07
Venstre	373	3.98
Social Liberals	291	3.11
Total	9,361	

== European Parliament elections results ==
2024 European Parliament election in Denmark

Parties	Vote		
Parties	Votes	%	+ / -
Green Left	10,557	26.17	+6.59
Social Democrats	5,008	12.42	-7.89
Social Liberals	4,459	11.05	-3.64
Red–Green Alliance	4,407	10.93	+2.82
Venstre	3,598	8.92	-5.91
Conservatives	3,460	8.58	+3.34
Liberal Alliance	2,615	6.48	+4.02
The Alternative	2,026	5.02	-1.14
Moderates	1,787	4.43	New
Danish People's Party	1,306	3.24	-2.31
Denmark Democrats	1,114	2.76	New
Total	40,337		

2019 European Parliament election in Denmark

Parties	Vote		
Parties	Votes	%	+ / -
Social Democrats	9,083	20.31	-1.07
Green Left	8,758	19.58	+1.83
Venstre	6,630	14.83	+2.17
Social Liberals	6,569	14.69	+4.81
Red–Green Alliance	3,627	8.11	New
The Alternative	2,756	6.16	New
Danish People's Party	2,484	5.55	-12.11
Conservatives	2,345	5.24	-1.44
People's Movement against the EU	1,370	3.06	-7.46
Liberal Alliance	1,098	2.46	-1.01
Total	44,720		

2014 European Parliament election in Denmark

Parties	Vote		
Parties	Votes	%	+ / -
Social Democrats	7,261	21.38	-6.21
Green Left	6,026	17.75	-4.74
Danish People's Party	5,996	17.66	+7.64
Venstre	4,298	12.66	-0.42
People's Movement against the EU	3,572	10.52	+2.46
Social Liberals	3,356	9.88	+4.01
Conservatives	2,268	6.68	-2.38
Liberal Alliance	1,177	3.47	+2.54
Total	33,954		

2009 European Parliament election in Denmark

Parties	Vote		
Parties	Votes	%	+ / -
Social Democrats	10,153	27.59	-6.42
Green Left	8,279	22.49	+9.82
Venstre	4,813	13.08	+0.95
Danish People's Party	3,688	10.02	+5.40
Conservatives	3,334	9.06	+1.17
People's Movement against the EU	2,965	8.06	+1.76
Social Liberals	2,162	5.87	-3.90
June Movement	1,069	2.90	-7.92
Liberal Alliance	343	0.93	New
Total	36,806		

2004 European Parliament election in Denmark

Parties	Vote		
Parties	Votes	%	+ / -
Social Democrats	7,685	34.01	+17.34
Green Left	2,863	12.67	+2.45
Venstre	2,740	12.13	-4.85
June Movement	2,445	10.82	-8.60
Social Liberals	2,208	9.77	-1.95
Conservatives	1,783	7.89	+1.79
People's Movement against the EU	1,424	6.30	-1.93
Danish People's Party	1,044	4.62	-0.23
Christian Democrats	402	1.78	-0.45
Total	22,594		

1999 European Parliament election in Denmark

Parties	Vote		
Parties	Votes	%	+ / -
June Movement	4,478	19.42	-2.59
Venstre	3,916	16.98	+4.27
Social Democrats	3,845	16.67	+1.46
Social Liberals	2,703	11.72	+3.27
Green Left	2,357	10.22	-2.02
People's Movement against the EU	1,899	8.23	-3.80
Conservatives	1,407	6.10	-7.30
Danish People's Party	1,119	4.85	New
Centre Democrats	826	3.58	+2.80
Christian Democrats	514	2.23	+1.25
Progress Party	103	0.45	-1.73
Total	23,064		

1994 European Parliament election in Denmark

Parties	Vote		
Parties	Votes	%	+ / -
June Movement	5,384	22.01	New
Social Democrats	3,721	15.21	-8.69
Conservatives	3,279	13.40	+4.15
Venstre	3,109	12.71	+3.40
Green Left	2,994	12.24	-3.47
People's Movement against the EU	2,944	12.03	-16.26
Social Liberals	2,067	8.45	+5.37
Progress Party	534	2.18	-1.07
Christian Democrats	239	0.98	-1.31
Centre Democrats	191	0.78	-4.13
Total	24,462		

1989 European Parliament election in Denmark

Parties	Vote		
Parties	Votes	%	+ / -
People's Movement against the EU	5,722	28.29	-3.25
Social Democrats	4,833	23.90	+3.26
Green Left	3,177	15.71	-0.05
Venstre	1,883	9.31	+3.89
Conservatives	1,871	9.25	-4.40
Centre Democrats	994	4.91	+0.82
Progress Party	658	3.25	+1.03
Social Liberals	622	3.08	+0.69
Christian Democrats	464	2.29	+0.64
Total	20,224		

1984 European Parliament election in Denmark

Parties	Vote	
Parties	Votes	%
People's Movement against the EU	7,481	31.54
Social Democrats	4,896	20.64
Green Left	3,738	15.76
Conservatives	3,238	13.65
Venstre	1,286	5.42
Centre Democrats	971	4.09
Left Socialists	626	2.64
Social Liberals	566	2.39
Progress Party	526	2.22
Christian Democrats	392	1.65
Total	23,720	

== Referendums ==
2022 Danish European Union opt-out referendum

Option	Votes	%
✓ YES	29,341	71.81
X NO	11,518	28.19

2015 Danish European Union opt-out referendum

Option	Votes	%
✓ YES	21,280	50.81
X NO	20,605	49.19

2014 Danish Unified Patent Court membership referendum

Option	Votes	%
✓ YES	19,934	60.26
X NO	13,146	39.74

2009 Danish Act of Succession referendum

Option	Votes	%
✓ YES	26,144	85.72
X NO	4,354	14.28

2000 Danish euro referendum

Option	Votes	%
X NO	20,423	51.50
✓ YES	19,232	48.50

1998 Danish Amsterdam Treaty referendum

Option	Votes	%
✓ YES	18,136	53.58
X NO	15,711	46.42

1993 Danish Maastricht Treaty referendum

Option	Votes	%
X NO	19,087	50.20
✓ YES	18,932	49.80

1992 Danish Maastricht Treaty referendum

Option	Votes	%
X NO	21,733	59.54
✓ YES	14,768	40.46

1986 Danish Single European Act referendum

Option	Votes	%
X NO	19,534	61.25
✓ YES	12,360	38.75

1972 Danish European Communities membership referendum

Option	Votes	%
X NO	18,820	51.22
✓ YES	17,920	48.78

1953 Danish constitutional and electoral age referendum

Option	Votes	%
✓ YES	16,632	78.36
X NO	4,593	21.64
21 years	13,577	59.91
23 years	9,086	40.09

1939 Danish constitutional referendum

Option	Votes	%
✓ YES	16,642	96.56
X NO	592	3.44
