= Aarhus West (nomination district) =

- Aarhus Vest
- Nomination district constituency for the Folketing
- Location of Aarhus West within East Jutland

- Location of East Jutland within Denmark
- Municipalities: Aarhus
- Constituency: East Jutland
- Electorate: 62,229 (2022)

Current constituency
- Created: 1970

Aarhus West nominating district is one of the 92 nominating districts that exists for Danish elections following the 2007 municipal reform. It is one of the four nomination districts in Aarhus Municipality, the others being Aarhus South, Aarhus North and Aarhus East. It was created in 1970, with its boundaries being slightly changed in 2007.

In general elections, the district is a strong area for parties commonly associated with the red bloc, and the Social Democrats has always won the most votes.

== General elections results ==
=== General elections in the 2020s ===
2022 Danish general election

Parties	Vote		
Parties	Votes	%	+ / -
Social Democrats	13,291	26.98	+0.89
Venstre	5,337	10.84	-5.95
Green Left	5,101	10.36	+1.45
Liberal Alliance	4,379	8.89	+6.51
Moderates	4,125	8.37	New
Red–Green Alliance	3,610	7.33	-2.08
Social Liberals	2,673	5.43	-9.12
Denmark Democrats	2,270	4.61	New
Conservatives	2,121	4.31	-0.74
The Alternative	2,048	4.16	+0.55
Independent Greens	1,821	3.70	New
New Right	1,320	2.68	+0.70
Danish People's Party	805	1.63	-4.99
Christian Democrats	301	0.61	-1.69
Jesper Antonsen	31	0.06	New
Chresten H. Ibsen	22	0.04	-0.12
Total	49,255		

=== General elections in the 2010s ===
2019 Danish general election

Parties	Vote		
Parties	Votes	%	+ / -
Social Democrats	13,059	26.09	-4.23
Venstre	8,404	16.79	+2.03
Social Liberals	7,285	14.55	+9.23
Red–Green Alliance	4,709	9.41	-0.43
Green Left	4,458	8.91	+4.01
Danish People's Party	3,315	6.62	-9.79
Conservatives	2,527	5.05	+2.29
The Alternative	1,809	3.61	-3.49
Liberal Alliance	1,191	2.38	-4.62
Christian Democrats	1,149	2.30	+1.12
New Right	992	1.98	New
Stram Kurs	749	1.50	New
Klaus Riskær Pedersen Party	322	0.64	New
Chresten H. Ibsen	78	0.16	New
Hans Schultz	7	0.01	New
Total	50,054		

2015 Danish general election

Parties	Vote		
Parties	Votes	%	+ / -
Social Democrats	14,570	30.32	-0.01
Danish People's Party	7,884	16.41	+6.51
Venstre	7,091	14.76	-7.09
Red–Green Alliance	4,730	9.84	+1.84
The Alternative	3,410	7.10	New
Liberal Alliance	3,362	7.00	+2.87
Social Liberals	2,555	5.32	-6.13
Green Left	2,355	4.90	-5.08
Conservatives	1,325	2.76	-0.82
Christian Democrats	569	1.18	+0.53
Yahya Hassan	178	0.37	New
Peter Ymer Nielsen	19	0.04	New
Poul Gundersen	7	0.01	New
Total	48,055		

2011 Danish general election

Parties	Vote		
Parties	Votes	%	+ / -
Social Democrats	14,810	30.33	-0.56
Venstre	10,669	21.85	+1.10
Social Liberals	5,591	11.45	+6.27
Green Left	4,872	9.98	-5.45
Danish People's Party	4,832	9.90	-2.28
Red–Green Alliance	3,908	8.00	+4.17
Liberal Alliance	2,015	4.13	+1.24
Conservatives	1,750	3.58	-4.34
Christian Democrats	315	0.65	-0.24
Ibrahim Gøkhan	45	0.09	New
Janus Kramer Møller	15	0.03	New
Total	48,822		

=== General elections in the 2000s ===
2007 Danish general election

Parties	Vote		
Parties	Votes	%	+ / -
Social Democrats	14,431	30.89	-1.59
Venstre	9,694	20.75	-0.61
Green Left	7,208	15.43	+8.69
Danish People's Party	5,691	12.18	+0.46
Conservatives	3,701	7.92	-1.23
Social Liberals	2,420	5.18	-5.70
Red–Green Alliance	1,788	3.83	-0.49
New Alliance	1,351	2.89	New
Christian Democrats	417	0.89	-1.02
Jes Krogh	11	0.02	New
Total	46,712		

2005 Danish general election

Parties	Vote		
Parties	Votes	%	+ / -
Social Democrats	17,153	32.48	-2.58
Venstre	11,281	21.36	-3.97
Danish People's Party	6,189	11.72	+0.38
Social Liberals	5,746	10.88	+5.45
Conservatives	4,833	9.15	+2.01
Green Left	3,559	6.74	-0.48
Red–Green Alliance	2,281	4.32	+0.84
Christian Democrats	1,006	1.91	-0.67
Centre Democrats	527	1.00	-0.85
Minority Party	215	0.41	New
Janus Kramer Møller	17	0.03	New
Total	52,807		

2001 Danish general election

Parties	Vote		
Parties	Votes	%	+ / -
Social Democrats	18,718	35.06	-7.08
Venstre	13,524	25.33	+5.28
Danish People's Party	6,057	11.34	+4.09
Green Left	3,855	7.22	-1.26
Conservatives	3,814	7.14	+0.18
Social Liberals	2,898	5.43	+1.73
Red–Green Alliance	1,860	3.48	-0.03
Christian People's Party	1,379	2.58	+0.34
Centre Democrats	989	1.85	-2.06
Progress Party	285	0.53	-0.82
Lars Bang	16	0.03	New
Total	53,395		

=== General elections in the 1990s ===
1998 Danish general election

Parties	Vote		
Parties	Votes	%	+ / -
Social Democrats	21,741	42.14	+4.99
Venstre	10,345	20.05	+0.87
Green Left	4,376	8.48	+0.50
Danish People's Party	3,740	7.25	New
Conservatives	3,589	6.96	-4.44
Centre Democrats	2,016	3.91	+1.30
Social Liberals	1,911	3.70	-0.51
Red–Green Alliance	1,812	3.51	+0.15
Christian People's Party	1,154	2.24	+0.52
Progress Party	694	1.35	-4.31
Democratic Renewal	202	0.39	New
John Juhler	17	0.03	New
Total	51,597		

1994 Danish general election

Parties	Vote		
Parties	Votes	%	+ / -
Social Democrats	19,182	37.15	-2.28
Venstre	9,906	19.18	+4.89
Conservatives	5,887	11.40	-0.58
Green Left	4,119	7.98	-3.33
Jacob Haugaard	3,449	6.68	+3.95
Progress Party	2,922	5.66	+0.16
Social Liberals	2,175	4.21	+0.68
Red–Green Alliance	1,737	3.36	+0.99
Centre Democrats	1,350	2.61	-2.15
Christian People's Party	889	1.72	+0.03
Søren Boelskifte	15	0.03	New
Bjarne S. Landsfeldt	4	0.01	New
Total	51,635		

1990 Danish general election

Parties	Vote		
Parties	Votes	%	+ / -
Social Democrats	19,667	39.43	+6.72
Venstre	7,129	14.29	+4.57
Conservatives	5,974	11.98	-4.29
Green Left	5,641	11.31	-5.88
Progress Party	2,741	5.50	-1.36
Centre Democrats	2,376	4.76	+0.48
Social Liberals	1,763	3.53	-2.24
Jacob Haugaard	1,362	2.73	+1.72
Red–Green Alliance	1,183	2.37	New
Christian People's Party	841	1.69	+0.22
Common Course	471	0.94	-0.26
The Greens	423	0.85	-0.27
Justice Party of Denmark	309	0.62	New
Total	49,880		

=== General elections in the 1980s ===
1988 Danish general election

Parties	Vote		
Parties	Votes	%	+ / -
Social Democrats	16,527	32.71	+1.52
Green Left	8,686	17.19	-2.00
Conservatives	8,219	16.27	-0.46
Venstre	4,911	9.72	+1.80
Progress Party	3,467	6.86	+3.19
Social Liberals	2,915	5.77	-1.19
Centre Democrats	2,164	4.28	-0.21
Christian People's Party	741	1.47	-0.19
Communist Party of Denmark	642	1.27	-0.03
Common Course	608	1.20	-0.46
The Greens	567	1.12	-0.05
Left Socialists	564	1.12	-1.38
Jacob Haugaard	508	1.01	+0.27
Finn Mikkelsen	8	0.02	New
Bruno Nielsen-Boreas	0	0.00	New
Total	50,527		

1987 Danish general election

Parties	Vote		
Parties	Votes	%	+ / -
Social Democrats	15,856	31.19	-1.48
Green Left	9,759	19.19	+1.93
Conservatives	8,506	16.73	-2.94
Venstre	4,028	7.92	-1.02
Social Liberals	3,540	6.96	+1.16
Centre Democrats	2,283	4.49	+0.40
Progress Party	1,868	3.67	+1.63
Left Socialists	1,273	2.50	-2.15
Common Course	845	1.66	New
Christian People's Party	844	1.66	+0.09
Communist Party of Denmark	659	1.30	+0.27
The Greens	595	1.17	New
Jacob Haugaard	375	0.74	+0.54
Justice Party of Denmark	295	0.58	-1.39
Humanist Party	71	0.14	New
Socialist Workers Party	23	0.05	-0.02
Marxist–Leninists Party	17	0.03	0.00
Henning Brønd-Nielsen	6	0.01	New
Total	50,843		

1984 Danish general election

Parties	Vote		
Parties	Votes	%	+ / -
Social Democrats	16,497	32.67	-3.20
Conservatives	9,934	19.67	+6.14
Green Left	8,715	17.26	-0.72
Venstre	4,515	8.94	+7.36
Social Liberals	2,930	5.80	+0.54
Left Socialists	2,349	4.65	+0.18
Centre Democrats	2,065	4.09	-4.97
Progress Party	1,030	2.04	-4.53
Justice Party of Denmark	995	1.97	0.00
Christian People's Party	794	1.57	+0.05
Communist Party of Denmark	519	1.03	-0.74
Jacob Haugaard	99	0.20	-0.01
Socialist Workers Party	36	0.07	-0.02
Marxist–Leninists Party	13	0.03	New
Total	50,491		

1981 Danish general election

Parties	Vote		
Parties	Votes	%	+ / -
Social Democrats	15,841	35.87	-4.73
Green Left	7,939	17.98	+7.90
Conservatives	5,975	13.53	+1.74
Centre Democrats	3,999	9.06	+6.27
Progress Party	2,903	6.57	-0.05
Social Liberals	2,321	5.26	-0.18
Left Socialists	1,976	4.47	-1.42
Justice Party of Denmark	872	1.97	-1.37
Communist Party of Denmark	782	1.77	-0.69
Venstre	696	1.58	-7.20
Christian People's Party	672	1.52	+0.02
Jacob Haugaard	92	0.21	-0.07
Communist Workers Party	48	0.11	-0.32
Socialist Workers Party	38	0.09	New
Henrik Christensen	3	0.01	New
Lars Michaelsen	2	0.00	New
Total	44,159		

=== General elections in the 1970s ===
1979 Danish general election

Parties	Vote		
Parties	Votes	%	+ / -
Social Democrats	19,133	40.60	-0.16
Conservatives	5,556	11.79	+3.93
Green Left	4,749	10.08	+3.55
Venstre	4,138	8.78	+0.35
Progress Party	3,118	6.62	-3.64
Left Socialists	2,775	5.89	+0.89
Social Liberals	2,565	5.44	+2.29
Justice Party of Denmark	1,573	3.34	-0.69
Centre Democrats	1,317	2.79	-3.63
Communist Party of Denmark	1,161	2.46	-2.03
Christian People's Party	705	1.50	-0.94
Communist Workers Party	205	0.43	New
Jacob Haugaard	132	0.28	New
Total	47,127		

1977 Danish general election

Parties	Vote		
Parties	Votes	%	+ / -
Social Democrats	18,475	40.76	+7.94
Progress Party	4,653	10.26	+0.13
Venstre	3,819	8.43	-10.10
Conservatives	3,564	7.86	+2.55
Green Left	2,959	6.53	-0.78
Centre Democrats	2,911	6.42	+4.13
Left Socialists	2,266	5.00	+1.16
Communist Party of Denmark	2,037	4.49	-0.43
Justice Party of Denmark	1,825	4.03	+1.43
Social Liberals	1,427	3.15	-4.44
Christian People's Party	1,106	2.44	-2.21
Pensioners' Party	280	0.62	New
Tommy Nielsen	7	0.02	New
Total	45,329		

1975 Danish general election

Parties	Vote		
Parties	Votes	%	+ / -
Social Democrats	14,802	32.82	+5.94
Venstre	8,355	18.53	+10.19
Progress Party	4,569	10.13	-3.39
Social Liberals	3,423	7.59	-3.34
Green Left	3,297	7.31	-1.51
Conservatives	2,396	5.31	-4.26
Communist Party of Denmark	2,221	4.92	+0.17
Christian People's Party	2,097	4.65	+1.62
Left Socialists	1,730	3.84	+1.61
Justice Party of Denmark	1,173	2.60	-1.84
Centre Democrats	1,031	2.29	-5.12
Elmer Mariager	4	0.01	New
Total	45,098		

1973 Danish general election

Parties	Vote		
Parties	Votes	%	+ / -
Social Democrats	11,977	26.88	-12.64
Progress Party	6,026	13.52	New
Social Liberals	4,872	10.93	-3.57
Conservatives	4,266	9.57	-7.92
Green Left	3,931	8.82	-1.81
Venstre	3,716	8.34	-2.80
Centre Democrats	3,300	7.41	New
Communist Party of Denmark	2,118	4.75	+3.41
Justice Party of Denmark	1,977	4.44	+2.33
Christian People's Party	1,352	3.03	+1.70
Left Socialists	993	2.23	+0.28
John Bove	33	0.07	New
Total	44,561		

1971 Danish general election

Parties	Vote		
Parties	Votes	%	+ / -
Social Democrats	15,455	39.52	+
Conservatives	6,839	17.49	+
Social Liberals	5,669	14.50	+
Venstre	4,356	11.14	+
Green Left	4,158	10.63	+
Justice Party of Denmark	824	2.11	+
Left Socialists	761	1.95	+
Communist Party of Denmark	525	1.34	+
Christian People's Party	522	1.33	New
Total	39,109		

== European Parliament elections results ==
2024 European Parliament election in Denmark

Parties	Vote		
Parties	Votes	%	+ / -
Green Left	7,279	21.21	+5.43
Social Democrats	5,408	15.76	-7.35
Venstre	3,636	10.60	-6.22
Red–Green Alliance	3,445	10.04	+1.80
Social Liberals	3,064	8.93	-4.09
Conservatives	2,976	8.67	+3.48
Liberal Alliance	2,149	6.26	+4.11
Moderates	2,083	6.07	New
Danish People's Party	1,615	4.71	-3.39
Denmark Democrats	1,492	4.35	New
The Alternative	1,167	3.40	-0.68
Total	34,314		

2019 European Parliament election in Denmark

Parties	Vote		
Parties	Votes	%	+ / -
Social Democrats	9,267	23.11	+1.31
Venstre	6,744	16.82	+3.23
Green Left	6,327	15.78	+1.68
Social Liberals	5,222	13.02	+5.62
Red–Green Alliance	3,306	8.24	New
Danish People's Party	3,248	8.10	-15.96
Conservatives	2,080	5.19	-1.82
The Alternative	1,638	4.08	New
People's Movement against the EU	1,405	3.50	-5.66
Liberal Alliance	863	2.15	-0.72
Total	40,100		

2014 European Parliament election in Denmark

Parties	Vote		
Parties	Votes	%	+ / -
Danish People's Party	7,575	24.06	+9.08
Social Democrats	6,866	21.80	-6.35
Green Left	4,441	14.10	-3.85
Venstre	4,278	13.59	-2.73
People's Movement against the EU	2,886	9.16	+2.23
Social Liberals	2,331	7.40	+3.83
Conservatives	2,208	7.01	-1.96
Liberal Alliance	905	2.87	+2.31
Total	31,490		

2009 European Parliament election in Denmark

Parties	Vote		
Parties	Votes	%	+ / -
Social Democrats	9,214	28.15	-6.58
Green Left	5,877	17.95	+6.93
Venstre	5,342	16.32	+2.75
Danish People's Party	4,904	14.98	+8.32
Conservatives	2,936	8.97	-0.45
People's Movement against the EU	2,267	6.93	+1.66
Social Liberals	1,168	3.57	-3.14
June Movement	842	2.57	-8.77
Liberal Alliance	183	0.56	New
Total	32,733		

2004 European Parliament election in Denmark

Parties	Vote		
Parties	Votes	%	+ / -
Social Democrats	10,228	34.73	+17.11
Venstre	3,996	13.57	-4.93
June Movement	3,339	11.34	-7.32
Green Left	3,246	11.02	+2.05
Conservatives	2,773	9.42	+2.57
Social Liberals	1,975	6.71	-3.20
Danish People's Party	1,961	6.66	+0.08
People's Movement against the EU	1,552	5.27	-2.03
Christian Democrats	381	1.29	-0.49
Total	29,451		

1999 European Parliament election in Denmark

Parties	Vote		
Parties	Votes	%	+ / -
June Movement	5,705	18.66	-0.89
Venstre	5,655	18.50	+4.39
Social Democrats	5,388	17.62	+2.36
Social Liberals	3,029	9.91	+1.46
Green Left	2,744	8.97	-2.02
People's Movement against the EU	2,232	7.30	-3.91
Conservatives	2,094	6.85	-9.11
Danish People's Party	2,011	6.58	New
Centre Democrats	1,173	3.84	+3.00
Christian Democrats	544	1.78	+0.91
Progress Party	163	0.53	-2.21
Total	30,575		

1994 European Parliament election in Denmark

Parties	Vote		
Parties	Votes	%	+ / -
June Movement	6,563	19.55	New
Conservatives	5,359	15.96	+3.52
Social Democrats	5,123	15.26	-7.29
Venstre	4,738	14.11	+3.40
People's Movement against the EU	3,764	11.21	-14.21
Green Left	3,691	10.99	-0.94
Social Liberals	2,838	8.45	+5.04
Progress Party	920	2.74	-1.71
Christian Democrats	293	0.87	-1.21
Centre Democrats	283	0.84	-6.16
Total	33,572		

1989 European Parliament election in Denmark

Parties	Vote		
Parties	Votes	%	+ / -
People's Movement against the EU	7,105	25.42	-2.01
Social Democrats	6,304	22.55	+4.26
Conservatives	3,476	12.44	-6.77
Green Left	3,334	11.93	-1.37
Venstre	2,994	10.71	+4.23
Centre Democrats	1,958	7.00	+1.22
Progress Party	1,245	4.45	+1.55
Social Liberals	954	3.41	+0.51
Christian Democrats	582	2.08	+0.55
Total	27,952		

1984 European Parliament election in Denmark

Parties	Vote	
Parties	Votes	%
People's Movement against the EU	8,669	27.43
Conservatives	6,070	19.21
Social Democrats	5,781	18.29
Green Left	4,205	13.30
Venstre	2,047	6.48
Centre Democrats	1,827	5.78
Social Liberals	917	2.90
Progress Party	915	2.90
Left Socialists	692	2.19
Christian Democrats	483	1.53
Total	31,606	

== Referendums ==
2022 Danish European Union opt-out referendum

Option	Votes	%
✓ YES	26,101	69.62
X NO	11,390	30.38

2015 Danish European Union opt-out referendum

Option	Votes	%
X NO	20,148	51.37
✓ YES	19,077	48.63

2014 Danish Unified Patent Court membership referendum

Option	Votes	%
✓ YES	18,603	60.84
X NO	11,974	39.16

2009 Danish Act of Succession referendum

Option	Votes	%
✓ YES	25,671	86.10
X NO	4,144	13.90

2000 Danish euro referendum

Option	Votes	%
X NO	27,427	52.04
✓ YES	25,277	47.96

1998 Danish Amsterdam Treaty referendum

Option	Votes	%
✓ YES	24,505	53.82
X NO	21,025	46.18

1993 Danish Maastricht Treaty referendum

Option	Votes	%
✓ YES	28,159	54.14
X NO	23,854	45.86

1992 Danish Maastricht Treaty referendum

Option	Votes	%
X NO	27,653	55.02
✓ YES	22,605	44.98

1986 Danish Single European Act referendum

Option	Votes	%
X NO	23,540	53.26
✓ YES	20,658	46.74

1972 Danish European Communities membership referendum

Option	Votes	%
✓ YES	25,626	58.68
X NO	18,045	41.32
