= Hillerød (nomination district) =

- Hillerød
- Nomination district constituency for the Folketing
- Location of Hillerød within North Zealand

- Location of North Zealand within Denmark
- Municipalities: Gribskov; Hillerød
- Constituency: North Zealand
- Electorate: 70,397 (2022)

Current constituency
- Created: 1849 (as constituency); 1920 (as nomination district)

Hillerød nominating district is one of the 92 nominating districts that was created for Danish elections following the 2007 municipal reform. It consists of Gribskov and Hillerød municipality. It was created in 1849 as a constituency, and has been a nomination district since 1920, though its boundaries have been changed since then.

In general elections, the district tends to vote a bit more for parties commonly associated with the blue bloc.

== General elections results ==
=== General elections in the 2020s ===
2022 Danish general election

| Parties | Vote | | |
| Parties | Votes | % | + / - |
|---|---|---|---|
| Social Democrats | 14,270 | 24.06 | +1.44 |
| Venstre | 8,108 | 13.67 | -10.44 |
| Moderates | 7,698 | 12.98 | New |
| Green Left | 4,875 | 8.22 | +1.30 |
| Liberal Alliance | 4,866 | 8.20 | +5.48 |
| Conservatives | 3,661 | 6.17 | -2.07 |
| Denmark Democrats | 3,592 | 6.06 | New |
| New Right | 2,814 | 4.74 | +1.09 |
| Red–Green Alliance | 2,641 | 4.45 | -1.48 |
| Social Liberals | 2,293 | 3.87 | -5.37 |
| The Alternative | 2,064 | 3.48 | +0.44 |
| Danish People's Party | 1,733 | 2.92 | -5.47 |
| Christian Democrats | 338 | 0.57 | -1.64 |
| Independent Greens | 284 | 0.48 | New |
| Jayseth Lotus Arrose Simoysano | 54 | 0.09 | New |
| Katjalivah Elleyhansen | 16 | 0.03 | New |
| Total | 59,307 | | |

=== General elections in the 2010s ===
2019 Danish general election

| Parties | Vote | | |
| Parties | Votes | % | + / - |
|---|---|---|---|
| Venstre | 13,996 | 24.11 | +2.70 |
| Social Democrats | 13,131 | 22.62 | +0.29 |
| Social Liberals | 5,362 | 9.24 | +4.23 |
| Danish People's Party | 4,869 | 8.39 | -12.81 |
| Conservatives | 4,786 | 8.24 | +4.72 |
| Green Left | 4,015 | 6.92 | +2.82 |
| Red–Green Alliance | 3,441 | 5.93 | -0.83 |
| New Right | 2,118 | 3.65 | New |
| The Alternative | 1,765 | 3.04 | -1.88 |
| Liberal Alliance | 1,580 | 2.72 | -6.57 |
| Christian Democrats | 1,283 | 2.21 | +0.79 |
| Stram Kurs | 1,048 | 1.81 | New |
| Klaus Riskær Pedersen Party | 566 | 0.97 | New |
| Gert Lassen | 86 | 0.15 | +0.14 |
| Hans Frederik Brobjerg | 8 | 0.01 | New |
| Total | 58,054 | | |

2015 Danish general election

| Parties | Vote | | |
| Parties | Votes | % | + / - |
|---|---|---|---|
| Social Democrats | 12,889 | 22.33 | +3.26 |
| Venstre | 12,358 | 21.41 | -12.49 |
| Danish People's Party | 12,234 | 21.20 | +9.88 |
| Liberal Alliance | 5,362 | 9.29 | +3.50 |
| Red–Green Alliance | 3,902 | 6.76 | +0.99 |
| Social Liberals | 2,893 | 5.01 | -5.63 |
| The Alternative | 2,840 | 4.92 | New |
| Green Left | 2,366 | 4.10 | -3.39 |
| Conservatives | 2,030 | 3.52 | -1.57 |
| Christian Democrats | 819 | 1.42 | +0.53 |
| Aleks Jensen | 11 | 0.02 | New |
| Gert Lassen | 6 | 0.01 | New |
| Total | 57,710 | | |

2011 Danish general election

| Parties | Vote | | |
| Parties | Votes | % | + / - |
|---|---|---|---|
| Venstre | 19,535 | 33.90 | +5.41 |
| Social Democrats | 10,989 | 19.07 | -3.04 |
| Danish People's Party | 6,526 | 11.32 | -2.31 |
| Social Liberals | 6,133 | 10.64 | +4.34 |
| Green Left | 4,319 | 7.49 | -3.71 |
| Liberal Alliance | 3,335 | 5.79 | +2.01 |
| Red–Green Alliance | 3,324 | 5.77 | +3.56 |
| Conservatives | 2,936 | 5.09 | -6.14 |
| Christian Democrats | 515 | 0.89 | -0.15 |
| Bjarne Holm | 21 | 0.04 | New |
| Total | 57,633 | | |

=== General elections in the 2000s ===
2007 Danish general election

| Parties | Vote | | |
| Parties | Votes | % | + / - |
|---|---|---|---|
| Venstre | 15,797 | 28.49 | -3.83 |
| Social Democrats | 12,261 | 22.11 | +1.99 |
| Danish People's Party | 7,559 | 13.63 | +1.64 |
| Conservatives | 6,228 | 11.23 | -1.23 |
| Green Left | 6,208 | 11.20 | +5.20 |
| Social Liberals | 3,495 | 6.30 | -5.86 |
| New Alliance | 2,095 | 3.78 | New |
| Red–Green Alliance | 1,227 | 2.21 | -0.97 |
| Christian Democrats | 577 | 1.04 | -0.57 |
| Total | 55,447 | | |

2005 Danish general election

| Parties | Vote | | |
| Parties | Votes | % | + / - |
|---|---|---|---|
| Venstre | 23,570 | 32.32 | -4.59 |
| Social Democrats | 13,939 | 19.12 | -4.24 |
| Conservatives | 9,086 | 12.46 | +3.36 |
| Social Liberals | 8,870 | 12.16 | +5.82 |
| Danish People's Party | 8,742 | 11.99 | +1.93 |
| Green Left | 4,230 | 5.80 | -1.26 |
| Red–Green Alliance | 2,321 | 3.18 | +0.99 |
| Christian Democrats | 1,172 | 1.61 | -0.61 |
| Centre Democrats | 842 | 1.15 | -1.29 |
| Minority Party | 146 | 0.20 | New |
| Total | 72,918 | | |

2001 Danish general election

| Parties | Vote | | |
| Parties | Votes | % | + / - |
|---|---|---|---|
| Venstre | 27,487 | 36.91 | +11.83 |
| Social Democrats | 17,401 | 23.36 | -5.36 |
| Danish People's Party | 7,489 | 10.06 | +2.90 |
| Conservatives | 6,779 | 9.10 | -5.49 |
| Green Left | 5,259 | 7.06 | -1.43 |
| Social Liberals | 4,725 | 6.34 | +2.28 |
| Centre Democrats | 1,814 | 2.44 | -3.32 |
| Christian People's Party | 1,650 | 2.22 | +0.13 |
| Red–Green Alliance | 1,632 | 2.19 | -0.41 |
| Progress Party | 239 | 0.32 | -0.82 |
| Total | 74,475 | | |

=== General elections in the 1990s ===
1998 Danish general election

| Parties | Vote | | |
| Parties | Votes | % | + / - |
|---|---|---|---|
| Social Democrats | 20,774 | 28.72 | +2.42 |
| Venstre | 18,141 | 25.08 | -0.27 |
| Conservatives | 10,555 | 14.59 | -6.27 |
| Green Left | 6,139 | 8.49 | +0.16 |
| Danish People's Party | 5,180 | 7.16 | New |
| Centre Democrats | 4,167 | 5.76 | +1.55 |
| Social Liberals | 2,939 | 4.06 | -1.19 |
| Red–Green Alliance | 1,883 | 2.60 | -0.79 |
| Christian People's Party | 1,513 | 2.09 | +0.54 |
| Progress Party | 824 | 1.14 | -3.57 |
| Democratic Renewal | 180 | 0.25 | New |
| Sabina Schilliing Nybo Rasmussen | 39 | 0.05 | New |
| Total | 72,334 | | |

1994 Danish general election

| Parties | Vote | | |
| Parties | Votes | % | + / - |
|---|---|---|---|
| Social Democrats | 18,442 | 26.30 | -2.22 |
| Venstre | 17,778 | 25.35 | +7.15 |
| Conservatives | 14,626 | 20.86 | +0.63 |
| Green Left | 5,842 | 8.33 | -0.44 |
| Social Liberals | 3,684 | 5.25 | +1.12 |
| Progress Party | 3,301 | 4.71 | +0.15 |
| Centre Democrats | 2,952 | 4.21 | -4.18 |
| Red–Green Alliance | 2,377 | 3.39 | +0.87 |
| Christian People's Party | 1,086 | 1.55 | -0.17 |
| Jørgen Ruberg | 38 | 0.05 | New |
| Total | 70,126 | | |

1990 Danish general election

| Parties | Vote | | |
| Parties | Votes | % | + / - |
|---|---|---|---|
| Social Democrats | 18,839 | 28.52 | +6.50 |
| Conservatives | 13,361 | 20.23 | -5.19 |
| Venstre | 12,021 | 18.20 | +7.79 |
| Green Left | 5,794 | 8.77 | -4.93 |
| Centre Democrats | 5,544 | 8.39 | +0.80 |
| Progress Party | 3,015 | 4.56 | -2.92 |
| Social Liberals | 2,728 | 4.13 | -2.93 |
| Red–Green Alliance | 1,662 | 2.52 | New |
| Christian People's Party | 1,137 | 1.72 | +0.14 |
| Common Course | 882 | 1.34 | -0.12 |
| The Greens | 709 | 1.07 | -0.81 |
| Justice Party of Denmark | 342 | 0.52 | New |
| Humanist Party | 22 | 0.03 | New |
| Total | 66,056 | | |

=== General elections in the 1980s ===
1988 Danish general election

| Parties | Vote | | |
| Parties | Votes | % | + / - |
|---|---|---|---|
| Conservatives | 17,010 | 25.42 | -1.89 |
| Social Democrats | 14,734 | 22.02 | +1.25 |
| Green Left | 9,167 | 13.70 | -1.68 |
| Venstre | 6,964 | 10.41 | +1.96 |
| Centre Democrats | 5,081 | 7.59 | -0.26 |
| Progress Party | 5,006 | 7.48 | +3.98 |
| Social Liberals | 4,727 | 7.06 | -1.21 |
| The Greens | 1,260 | 1.88 | -0.14 |
| Christian People's Party | 1,057 | 1.58 | -0.16 |
| Common Course | 979 | 1.46 | -0.27 |
| Communist Party of Denmark | 596 | 0.89 | -0.04 |
| Left Socialists | 330 | 0.49 | -0.83 |
| Lars Kristensen | 14 | 0.02 | -0.01 |
| Total | 66,925 | | |

1987 Danish general election

| Parties | Vote | | |
| Parties | Votes | % | + / - |
|---|---|---|---|
| Conservatives | 18,472 | 27.31 | -2.29 |
| Social Democrats | 14,045 | 20.77 | -3.15 |
| Green Left | 10,402 | 15.38 | +3.12 |
| Venstre | 5,713 | 8.45 | -3.92 |
| Social Liberals | 5,592 | 8.27 | +1.29 |
| Centre Democrats | 5,307 | 7.85 | +2.86 |
| Progress Party | 2,367 | 3.50 | +0.80 |
| The Greens | 1,364 | 2.02 | New |
| Christian People's Party | 1,175 | 1.74 | -0.09 |
| Common Course | 1,167 | 1.73 | New |
| Left Socialists | 891 | 1.32 | -1.61 |
| Communist Party of Denmark | 626 | 0.93 | +0.11 |
| Justice Party of Denmark | 317 | 0.47 | -1.04 |
| Humanist Party | 129 | 0.19 | New |
| Socialist Workers Party | 33 | 0.05 | +0.01 |
| Lars Kristensen | 23 | 0.03 | +0.02 |
| Marxist–Leninists Party | 13 | 0.02 | -0.01 |
| Total | 67,636 | | |

1984 Danish general election

| Parties | Vote | | |
| Parties | Votes | % | + / - |
|---|---|---|---|
| Conservatives | 19,431 | 29.60 | +9.64 |
| Social Democrats | 15,697 | 23.92 | -1.65 |
| Venstre | 8,117 | 12.37 | +1.80 |
| Green Left | 8,050 | 12.26 | -0.14 |
| Social Liberals | 4,583 | 6.98 | +0.97 |
| Centre Democrats | 3,274 | 4.99 | -5.29 |
| Left Socialists | 1,922 | 2.93 | +0.09 |
| Progress Party | 1,771 | 2.70 | -5.32 |
| Christian People's Party | 1,202 | 1.83 | +0.29 |
| Justice Party of Denmark | 994 | 1.51 | +0.05 |
| Communist Party of Denmark | 539 | 0.82 | -0.30 |
| Socialist Workers Party | 24 | 0.04 | 0.00 |
| Marxist–Leninists Party | 17 | 0.03 | New |
| Lars Kristensen | 8 | 0.01 | New |
| Leni Thomsen | 5 | 0.01 | New |
| Lars Bjørnbak Hallstein | 1 | 0.00 | New |
| Total | 65,635 | | |

1981 Danish general election

| Parties | Vote | | |
| Parties | Votes | % | + / - |
|---|---|---|---|
| Social Democrats | 15,533 | 25.57 | -6.56 |
| Conservatives | 12,128 | 19.96 | +3.02 |
| Green Left | 7,533 | 12.40 | +6.09 |
| Venstre | 6,420 | 10.57 | -2.30 |
| Centre Democrats | 6,246 | 10.28 | +5.85 |
| Progress Party | 4,872 | 8.02 | -1.88 |
| Social Liberals | 3,651 | 6.01 | -0.37 |
| Left Socialists | 1,723 | 2.84 | -1.49 |
| Christian People's Party | 935 | 1.54 | -0.19 |
| Justice Party of Denmark | 884 | 1.46 | -1.26 |
| Communist Party of Denmark | 681 | 1.12 | -0.65 |
| Communist Workers Party | 127 | 0.21 | -0.28 |
| Socialist Workers Party | 22 | 0.04 | New |
| Total | 60,755 | | |

=== General elections in the 1970s ===
1979 Danish general election

| Parties | Vote | | |
| Parties | Votes | % | + / - |
|---|---|---|---|
| Social Democrats | 19,433 | 32.13 | +1.62 |
| Conservatives | 10,247 | 16.94 | +6.77 |
| Venstre | 7,781 | 12.87 | +0.26 |
| Progress Party | 5,986 | 9.90 | -5.06 |
| Social Liberals | 3,859 | 6.38 | +2.44 |
| Green Left | 3,814 | 6.31 | +1.92 |
| Centre Democrats | 2,681 | 4.43 | -5.95 |
| Left Socialists | 2,617 | 4.33 | +0.68 |
| Justice Party of Denmark | 1,646 | 2.72 | -0.76 |
| Communist Party of Denmark | 1,072 | 1.77 | -1.18 |
| Christian People's Party | 1,047 | 1.73 | -0.70 |
| Communist Workers Party | 296 | 0.49 | New |
| Total | 60,479 | | |

1977 Danish general election

| Parties | Vote | | |
| Parties | Votes | % | + / - |
|---|---|---|---|
| Social Democrats | 17,265 | 30.51 | +9.01 |
| Progress Party | 8,467 | 14.96 | +0.98 |
| Venstre | 7,137 | 12.61 | -15.34 |
| Centre Democrats | 5,873 | 10.38 | +6.95 |
| Conservatives | 5,756 | 10.17 | +3.17 |
| Green Left | 2,483 | 4.39 | -0.99 |
| Social Liberals | 2,229 | 3.94 | -4.22 |
| Left Socialists | 2,066 | 3.65 | +0.68 |
| Justice Party of Denmark | 1,968 | 3.48 | +1.22 |
| Communist Party of Denmark | 1,667 | 2.95 | -0.25 |
| Christian People's Party | 1,374 | 2.43 | -1.68 |
| Pensioners' Party | 305 | 0.54 | New |
| Kaj Boriths-Sørensen | 2 | 0.00 | New |
| Total | 56,592 | | |

1975 Danish general election

| Parties | Vote | | |
| Parties | Votes | % | + / - |
|---|---|---|---|
| Venstre | 14,656 | 27.95 | +14.62 |
| Social Democrats | 11,275 | 21.50 | +4.65 |
| Progress Party | 7,330 | 13.98 | -3.41 |
| Social Liberals | 4,281 | 8.16 | -3.56 |
| Conservatives | 3,668 | 7.00 | -4.50 |
| Green Left | 2,820 | 5.38 | -0.51 |
| Christian People's Party | 2,153 | 4.11 | +1.27 |
| Centre Democrats | 1,799 | 3.43 | -9.27 |
| Communist Party of Denmark | 1,677 | 3.20 | +0.34 |
| Left Socialists | 1,556 | 2.97 | +1.13 |
| Justice Party of Denmark | 1,184 | 2.26 | -0.81 |
| H. Lindholt | 36 | 0.07 | New |
| Total | 52,435 | | |

1973 Danish general election

| Parties | Vote | | |
| Parties | Votes | % | + / - |
|---|---|---|---|
| Progress Party | 8,811 | 17.39 | New |
| Social Democrats | 8,539 | 16.85 | -13.08 |
| Venstre | 6,755 | 13.33 | -4.56 |
| Centre Democrats | 6,433 | 12.70 | New |
| Social Liberals | 5,938 | 11.72 | -4.05 |
| Conservatives | 5,826 | 11.50 | -10.61 |
| Green Left | 2,985 | 5.89 | -2.52 |
| Justice Party of Denmark | 1,553 | 3.07 | +1.36 |
| Communist Party of Denmark | 1,449 | 2.86 | +1.77 |
| Christian People's Party | 1,440 | 2.84 | +1.53 |
| Left Socialists | 934 | 1.84 | +0.06 |
| Total | 50,663 | | |

1971 Danish general election

| Parties | Vote | | |
| Parties | Votes | % | + / - |
|---|---|---|---|
| Social Democrats | 12,862 | 29.93 | +1.35 |
| Conservatives | 9,503 | 22.11 | -0.98 |
| Venstre | 7,688 | 17.89 | -5.30 |
| Social Liberals | 6,776 | 15.77 | +0.99 |
| Green Left | 3,616 | 8.41 | +3.53 |
| Left Socialists | 767 | 1.78 | -0.10 |
| Justice Party of Denmark | 735 | 1.71 | +1.24 |
| Christian People's Party | 562 | 1.31 | New |
| Communist Party of Denmark | 467 | 1.09 | +0.15 |
| Total | 42,976 | | |

=== General elections in the 1960s ===
1968 Danish general election

| Parties | Vote | | |
| Parties | Votes | % | + / - |
|---|---|---|---|
| Social Democrats | 11,636 | 28.58 | -5.26 |
| Venstre | 9,443 | 23.19 | -1.83 |
| Conservatives | 9,400 | 23.09 | +2.62 |
| Social Liberals | 6,017 | 14.78 | +8.09 |
| Green Left | 1,989 | 4.88 | -3.61 |
| Liberal Centre | 779 | 1.91 | -1.44 |
| Left Socialists | 766 | 1.88 | New |
| Communist Party of Denmark | 381 | 0.94 | +0.35 |
| Justice Party of Denmark | 190 | 0.47 | +0.06 |
| Independent Party | 117 | 0.29 | -0.85 |
| Total | 40,718 | | |

1966 Danish general election

| Parties | Vote | | |
| Parties | Votes | % | + / - |
|---|---|---|---|
| Social Democrats | 12,543 | 33.84 | -3.51 |
| Venstre | 9,275 | 25.02 | -4.50 |
| Conservatives | 7,587 | 20.47 | +0.69 |
| Green Left | 3,146 | 8.49 | +3.91 |
| Social Liberals | 2,480 | 6.69 | +1.94 |
| Liberal Centre | 1,241 | 3.35 | New |
| Independent Party | 421 | 1.14 | -0.62 |
| Communist Party of Denmark | 217 | 0.59 | -0.33 |
| Justice Party of Denmark | 151 | 0.41 | -0.54 |
| Carl Møller | 5 | 0.01 | -0.02 |
| Erik Hoffmeyer | 4 | 0.01 | New |
| P. Lüchow | 0 | 0.00 | -0.02 |
| Total | 37,070 | | |

1964 Danish general election

| Parties | Vote | | |
| Parties | Votes | % | + / - |
|---|---|---|---|
| Social Democrats | 12,035 | 37.35 | -1.39 |
| Venstre | 9,512 | 29.52 | -1.17 |
| Conservatives | 6,372 | 19.78 | +4.96 |
| Social Liberals | 1,531 | 4.75 | -0.90 |
| Green Left | 1,477 | 4.58 | -0.55 |
| Independent Party | 567 | 1.76 | -0.70 |
| Justice Party of Denmark | 307 | 0.95 | -0.60 |
| Communist Party of Denmark | 296 | 0.92 | -0.03 |
| Danish Unity | 108 | 0.34 | New |
| Carl Møller | 9 | 0.03 | New |
| P. Lüchow | 7 | 0.02 | New |
| Total | 32,221 | | |

1960 Danish general election

| Parties | Vote | | |
| Parties | Votes | % | + / - |
|---|---|---|---|
| Social Democrats | 10,234 | 38.74 | +2.65 |
| Venstre | 8,106 | 30.69 | -3.62 |
| Conservatives | 3,915 | 14.82 | +1.09 |
| Social Liberals | 1,493 | 5.65 | -2.19 |
| Green Left | 1,355 | 5.13 | New |
| Independent Party | 651 | 2.46 | +1.17 |
| Justice Party of Denmark | 409 | 1.55 | -2.85 |
| Communist Party of Denmark | 251 | 0.95 | -1.39 |
| Total | 26,414 | | |

=== General elections in the 1950s ===
1957 Danish general election

| Parties | Vote | | |
| Parties | Votes | % | + / - |
|---|---|---|---|
| Social Democrats | 8,556 | 36.09 | -2.22 |
| Venstre | 8,135 | 34.31 | +2.23 |
| Conservatives | 3,255 | 13.73 | -0.68 |
| Social Liberals | 1,859 | 7.84 | -0.17 |
| Justice Party of Denmark | 1,042 | 4.40 | +1.90 |
| Communist Party of Denmark | 554 | 2.34 | -0.78 |
| Independent Party | 307 | 1.29 | -0.27 |
| Total | 23,708 | | |

September 1953 Danish Folketing election

| Parties | Vote | | |
| Parties | Votes | % | + / - |
|---|---|---|---|
| Social Democrats | 8,230 | 38.31 | +1.28 |
| Venstre | 6,892 | 32.08 | +2.66 |
| Conservatives | 3,096 | 14.41 | -1.63 |
| Social Liberals | 1,720 | 8.01 | -1.07 |
| Communist Party of Denmark | 670 | 3.12 | -0.31 |
| Justice Party of Denmark | 538 | 2.50 | -2.02 |
| Independent Party | 335 | 1.56 | New |
| Total | 21,481 | | |

April 1953 Danish Folketing election

| Parties | Vote | | |
| Parties | Votes | % | + / - |
|---|---|---|---|
| Social Democrats | 7,440 | 37.03 | -1.17 |
| Venstre | 5,910 | 29.42 | +0.47 |
| Conservatives | 3,223 | 16.04 | +0.07 |
| Social Liberals | 1,825 | 9.08 | +0.13 |
| Justice Party of Denmark | 909 | 4.52 | -0.54 |
| Communist Party of Denmark | 689 | 3.43 | +0.56 |
| Danish Unity | 94 | 0.47 | New |
| Total | 20,090 | | |

1950 Danish Folketing election

| Parties | Vote | | |
| Parties | Votes | % | + / - |
|---|---|---|---|
| Social Democrats | 7,510 | 38.20 | -0.41 |
| Venstre | 5,691 | 28.95 | -5.40 |
| Conservatives | 3,140 | 15.97 | +4.78 |
| Social Liberals | 1,760 | 8.95 | +1.44 |
| Justice Party of Denmark | 994 | 5.06 | +2.28 |
| Communist Party of Denmark | 565 | 2.87 | -2.03 |
| Total | 19,660 | | |

=== General elections in the 1940s ===
1947 Danish Folketing election

| Parties | Vote | | |
| Parties | Votes | % | + / - |
|---|---|---|---|
| Social Democrats | 7,545 | 38.61 | +5.98 |
| Venstre | 6,713 | 34.35 | +6.06 |
| Conservatives | 2,186 | 11.19 | -4.53 |
| Social Liberals | 1,467 | 7.51 | -4.05 |
| Communist Party of Denmark | 958 | 4.90 | -4.02 |
| Justice Party of Denmark | 543 | 2.78 | +1.76 |
| Danish Unity | 129 | 0.66 | -1.21 |
| Total | 19,541 | | |

1945 Danish Folketing election

| Parties | Vote | | |
| Parties | Votes | % | + / - |
|---|---|---|---|
| Social Democrats | 6,226 | 32.63 | -8.88 |
| Venstre | 5,397 | 28.29 | +7.99 |
| Conservatives | 2,999 | 15.72 | -4.65 |
| Social Liberals | 2,206 | 11.56 | -0.94 |
| Communist Party of Denmark | 1,702 | 8.92 | New |
| Danish Unity | 356 | 1.87 | +0.10 |
| Justice Party of Denmark | 194 | 1.02 | -0.11 |
| Total | 19,080 | | |

1943 Danish Folketing election

| Parties | Vote | | |
| Parties | Votes | % | + / - |
|---|---|---|---|
| Social Democrats | 7,645 | 41.51 | +2.03 |
| Conservatives | 3,751 | 20.37 | +2.17 |
| Venstre | 3,738 | 20.30 | -1.28 |
| Social Liberals | 2,302 | 12.50 | -1.12 |
| National Socialist Workers' Party of Denmark | 342 | 1.86 | +0.08 |
| Danish Unity | 326 | 1.77 | +1.51 |
| Justice Party of Denmark | 209 | 1.13 | -0.67 |
| Farmers' Party | 103 | 0.56 | -1.01 |
| Total | 18,416 | | |

=== General elections in the 1930s ===
1939 Danish Folketing election

| Parties | Vote | | |
| Parties | Votes | % | + / - |
|---|---|---|---|
| Social Democrats | 6,200 | 39.48 | -4.06 |
| Venstre | 3,389 | 21.58 | +1.83 |
| Conservatives | 2,859 | 18.20 | -1.59 |
| Social Liberals | 2,139 | 13.62 | +2.15 |
| Justice Party of Denmark | 283 | 1.80 | -0.69 |
| National Socialist Workers' Party of Denmark | 279 | 1.78 | +1.27 |
| Farmers' Party | 246 | 1.57 | -0.15 |
| Communist Party of Denmark | 193 | 1.23 | +0.49 |
| National Cooperation | 77 | 0.49 | New |
| Danish Unity | 41 | 0.26 | New |
| Total | 15,706 | | |

1935 Danish Folketing election

| Parties | Vote | | |
| Parties | Votes | % | + / - |
|---|---|---|---|
| Social Democrats | 6,454 | 43.54 | +3.20 |
| Conservatives | 2,934 | 19.79 | +0.67 |
| Venstre | 2,927 | 19.75 | -8.74 |
| Social Liberals | 1,700 | 11.47 | +1.48 |
| Justice Party of Denmark | 369 | 2.49 | +0.86 |
| Independent People's Party | 255 | 1.72 | New |
| Communist Party of Denmark | 109 | 0.74 | +0.31 |
| National Socialist Workers' Party of Denmark | 76 | 0.51 | New |
| Total | 14,824 | | |

1932 Danish Folketing election

| Parties | Vote | | |
| Parties | Votes | % | + / - |
|---|---|---|---|
| Social Democrats | 5,575 | 40.34 | +3.28 |
| Venstre | 3,937 | 28.49 | -3.14 |
| Conservatives | 2,643 | 19.12 | +2.32 |
| Social Liberals | 1,380 | 9.99 | -3.63 |
| Justice Party of Denmark | 225 | 1.63 | +0.74 |
| Communist Party of Denmark | 60 | 0.43 | New |
| Total | 13,820 | | |

=== General elections in the 1920s ===
1929 Danish Folketing election

| Parties | Vote | | |
| Parties | Votes | % | + / - |
|---|---|---|---|
| Social Democrats | 4,818 | 37.06 | +10.13 |
| Venstre | 4,112 | 31.63 | +6.44 |
| Conservatives | 2,184 | 16.80 | -1.33 |
| Social Liberals | 1,771 | 13.62 | -4.51 |
| Justice Party of Denmark | 116 | 0.89 | +0.24 |
| Total | 13,001 | | |

1926 Danish Folketing election

| Parties | Vote | | |
| Parties | Votes | % | + / - |
|---|---|---|---|
| Social Democrats | 3,959 | 26.93 | -6.99 |
| Social Liberals | 2,665 | 18.13 | +3.34 |
| Conservatives | 2,665 | 18.13 | -0.64 |
| Conservatives | 2,665 | 18.13 | -0.64 |
| Independence Party | 1,611 | 10.96 | New |
| Justice Party of Denmark | 96 | 0.65 | New |
| Total | 14,699 | | |

1924 Danish Folketing election

| Parties | Vote | | |
| Parties | Votes | % | + / - |
|---|---|---|---|
| Social Democrats | 3,860 | 33.92 | +3.11 |
| Venstre | 3,437 | 30.20 | -8.04 |
| Conservatives | 2,136 | 18.77 | +2.68 |
| Social Liberals | 1,683 | 14.79 | +2.82 |
| Farmer Party | 214 | 1.88 | New |
| Communist Party of Denmark | 51 | 0.45 | New |
| Total | 11,381 | | |

September 1920 Danish Folketing election

| Parties | Vote | | |
| Parties | Votes | % | + / - |
|---|---|---|---|
| Venstre | 4,065 | 38.24 | -3.93 |
| Social Democrats | 3,275 | 30.81 | +2.81 |
| Conservatives | 1,711 | 16.09 | -0.88 |
| Social Liberals | 1,272 | 11.97 | +1.54 |
| Industry Party | 179 | 1.68 | +0.11 |
| Danish Left Socialist Party | 66 | 0.62 | New |
| Total | 10,631 | | |

July 1920 Danish Folketing election

| Parties | Vote | | |
| Parties | Votes | % | + / - |
|---|---|---|---|
| Venstre | 3,832 | 42.17 | +2.75 |
| Social Democrats | 2,545 | 28.00 | -0.43 |
| Conservatives | 1,542 | 16.97 | -1.39 |
| Social Liberals | 948 | 10.43 | -2.08 |
| Industry Party | 143 | 1.57 | +0.60 |
| Daniel Nielsen | 62 | 0.68 | New |
| Total | 9,088 | | |

April 1920 Danish Folketing election

| Parties | Vote | |
| Parties | Votes | % |
|---|---|---|
| Venstre | 3,760 | 39.42 |
| Social Democrats | 2,712 | 28.43 |
| Conservatives | 1,751 | 18.36 |
| Social Liberals | 1,193 | 12.51 |
| Industry Party | 93 | 0.97 |
| Elias S. Nielsen | 30 | 0.31 |
| Total | 9,539 | |

== European Parliament elections results ==
2024 European Parliament election in Denmark

| Parties | Vote | | |
| Parties | Votes | % | + / - |
|---|---|---|---|
| Green Left | 7,519 | 17.50 | +4.07 |
| Venstre | 5,922 | 13.79 | -10.71 |
| Social Democrats | 5,821 | 13.55 | -4.98 |
| Conservatives | 4,730 | 11.01 | +3.26 |
| Moderates | 3,879 | 9.03 | New |
| Social Liberals | 3,315 | 7.72 | -3.00 |
| Liberal Alliance | 3,103 | 7.22 | +5.12 |
| Danish People's Party | 2,942 | 6.85 | -3.95 |
| Red–Green Alliance | 2,482 | 5.78 | +0.80 |
| Denmark Democrats | 2,222 | 5.17 | New |
| The Alternative | 1,021 | 2.38 | -0.90 |
| Total | 42,956 | | |

2019 European Parliament election in Denmark

| Parties | Vote | | |
| Parties | Votes | % | + / - |
|---|---|---|---|
| Venstre | 11,500 | 24.50 | +6.13 |
| Social Democrats | 8,698 | 18.53 | +2.08 |
| Green Left | 6,305 | 13.43 | +2.03 |
| Danish People's Party | 5,068 | 10.80 | -16.18 |
| Social Liberals | 5,029 | 10.72 | +3.79 |
| Conservatives | 3,635 | 7.75 | -1.09 |
| Red–Green Alliance | 2,339 | 4.98 | New |
| People's Movement against the EU | 1,835 | 3.91 | -3.72 |
| The Alternative | 1,538 | 3.28 | New |
| Liberal Alliance | 986 | 2.10 | -1.31 |
| Total | 46,933 | | |

2014 European Parliament election in Denmark

| Parties | Vote | | |
| Parties | Votes | % | + / - |
|---|---|---|---|
| Danish People's Party | 10,584 | 26.98 | +11.67 |
| Venstre | 7,204 | 18.37 | -3.39 |
| Social Democrats | 6,452 | 16.45 | -1.61 |
| Green Left | 4,470 | 11.40 | -4.65 |
| Conservatives | 3,466 | 8.84 | -4.44 |
| People's Movement against the EU | 2,993 | 7.63 | -0.51 |
| Social Liberals | 2,719 | 6.93 | +2.47 |
| Liberal Alliance | 1,337 | 3.41 | +2.79 |
| Total | 39,225 | | |

2009 European Parliament election in Denmark

| Parties | Vote | | |
| Parties | Votes | % | + / - |
|---|---|---|---|
| Venstre | 8,633 | 21.76 | +3.80 |
| Social Democrats | 7,164 | 18.06 | -9.19 |
| Green Left | 6,366 | 16.05 | +6.62 |
| Danish People's Party | 6,074 | 15.31 | +9.07 |
| Conservatives | 5,268 | 13.28 | -2.66 |
| People's Movement against the EU | 3,230 | 8.14 | +2.58 |
| Social Liberals | 1,769 | 4.46 | -3.30 |
| June Movement | 920 | 2.32 | -6.39 |
| Liberal Alliance | 246 | 0.62 | New |
| Total | 39,670 | | |

2004 European Parliament election in Denmark

| Parties | Vote | | |
| Parties | Votes | % | + / - |
|---|---|---|---|
| Social Democrats | 12,263 | 27.25 | +15.96 |
| Venstre | 8,082 | 17.96 | -7.44 |
| Conservatives | 7,175 | 15.94 | +5.49 |
| Green Left | 4,242 | 9.43 | +0.82 |
| June Movement | 3,921 | 8.71 | -6.61 |
| Social Liberals | 3,494 | 7.76 | -2.40 |
| Danish People's Party | 2,807 | 6.24 | +1.16 |
| People's Movement against the EU | 2,503 | 5.56 | -2.20 |
| Christian Democrats | 512 | 1.14 | -0.49 |
| Total | 44,999 | | |

1999 European Parliament election in Denmark

| Parties | Vote | | |
| Parties | Votes | % | + / - |
|---|---|---|---|
| Venstre | 11,608 | 25.40 | +6.61 |
| June Movement | 7,002 | 15.32 | +0.28 |
| Social Democrats | 5,159 | 11.29 | -0.25 |
| Conservatives | 4,776 | 10.45 | -10.84 |
| Social Liberals | 4,645 | 10.16 | -0.34 |
| Green Left | 3,934 | 8.61 | -0.87 |
| People's Movement against the EU | 3,547 | 7.76 | -1.26 |
| Danish People's Party | 2,322 | 5.08 | New |
| Centre Democrats | 1,968 | 4.31 | +3.09 |
| Christian Democrats | 743 | 1.63 | +0.69 |
| Progress Party | 148 | 0.32 | -1.85 |
| Total | 45,704 | | |

1994 European Parliament election in Denmark

| Parties | Vote | | |
| Parties | Votes | % | + / - |
|---|---|---|---|
| Conservatives | 10,029 | 21.29 | +4.30 |
| Venstre | 8,848 | 18.79 | +2.52 |
| June Movement | 7,085 | 15.04 | New |
| Social Democrats | 5,435 | 11.54 | -6.04 |
| Social Liberals | 4,944 | 10.50 | +7.43 |
| Green Left | 4,463 | 9.48 | +0.08 |
| People's Movement against the EU | 4,250 | 9.02 | -11.02 |
| Progress Party | 1,022 | 2.17 | -1.86 |
| Centre Democrats | 576 | 1.22 | -9.42 |
| Christian Democrats | 445 | 0.94 | -1.05 |
| Total | 47,097 | | |

1989 European Parliament election in Denmark

| Parties | Vote | | |
| Parties | Votes | % | + / - |
|---|---|---|---|
| People's Movement against the EU | 7,575 | 20.04 | -3.19 |
| Social Democrats | 6,647 | 17.58 | +3.54 |
| Conservatives | 6,423 | 16.99 | -9.47 |
| Venstre | 6,152 | 16.27 | +6.31 |
| Centre Democrats | 4,022 | 10.64 | +2.87 |
| Green Left | 3,555 | 9.40 | +0.36 |
| Progress Party | 1,522 | 4.03 | +1.15 |
| Social Liberals | 1,159 | 3.07 | -0.38 |
| Christian Democrats | 751 | 1.99 | -0.01 |
| Total | 37,806 | | |

1984 European Parliament election in Denmark

| Parties | Vote | |
| Parties | Votes | % |
|---|---|---|
| Conservatives | 10,662 | 26.46 |
| People's Movement against the EU | 9,362 | 23.23 |
| Social Democrats | 5,657 | 14.04 |
| Venstre | 4,015 | 9.96 |
| Green Left | 3,644 | 9.04 |
| Centre Democrats | 3,130 | 7.77 |
| Social Liberals | 1,389 | 3.45 |
| Progress Party | 1,161 | 2.88 |
| Christian Democrats | 806 | 2.00 |
| Left Socialists | 473 | 1.17 |
| Total | 40,299 | |

== Referendums ==
2022 Danish European Union opt-out referendum

| Option | Votes | % |
|---|---|---|
| ✓ YES | 32,921 | 68.22 |
| X NO | 15,334 | 31.78 |

2015 Danish European Union opt-out referendum

| Option | Votes | % |
|---|---|---|
| X NO | 24,883 | 50.64 |
| ✓ YES | 24,256 | 49.36 |

2014 Danish Unified Patent Court membership referendum

| Option | Votes | % |
|---|---|---|
| ✓ YES | 25,032 | 65.26 |
| X NO | 13,327 | 34.74 |

2009 Danish Act of Succession referendum

| Option | Votes | % |
|---|---|---|
| ✓ YES | 31,431 | 85.73 |
| X NO | 5,230 | 14.27 |

2000 Danish euro referendum

| Option | Votes | % |
|---|---|---|
| ✓ YES | 39,240 | 52.95 |
| X NO | 34,865 | 47.05 |

1998 Danish Amsterdam Treaty referendum

| Option | Votes | % |
|---|---|---|
| ✓ YES | 39,021 | 59.72 |
| X NO | 26,315 | 40.28 |

1993 Danish Maastricht Treaty referendum

| Option | Votes | % |
|---|---|---|
| ✓ YES | 43,720 | 61.64 |
| X NO | 27,211 | 38.36 |

1992 Danish Maastricht Treaty referendum

| Option | Votes | % |
|---|---|---|
| ✓ YES | 37,642 | 55.14 |
| X NO | 30,628 | 44.86 |

1986 Danish Single European Act referendum

| Option | Votes | % |
|---|---|---|
| ✓ YES | 34,591 | 58.71 |
| X NO | 24,324 | 41.29 |

1972 Danish European Communities membership referendum

| Option | Votes | % |
|---|---|---|
| ✓ YES | 48,000 | 60.05 |
| X NO | 31,931 | 39.95 |

1953 Danish constitutional and electoral age referendum

| Option | Votes | % |
|---|---|---|
| ✓ YES | 12,662 | 81.82 |
| X NO | 2,814 | 18.18 |
| 23 years | 9,603 | 59.69 |
| 21 years | 6,485 | 40.31 |

1939 Danish constitutional referendum

| Option | Votes | % |
|---|---|---|
| ✓ YES | 7,891 | 90.67 |
| X NO | 812 | 9.33 |
