= Bjarne Møgelhøj =

Danish politician (born 1944)

Bjarne Møgelhøj (born 14 May 1944) is a Danish politician for the party New Alliance. He joined the party in August 2007 from the position of leader of the Centre Democrats party.

1983–1998 he was the leader of FDB (now part of Coop Norden). He was briefly newscaster on DR2 and is the chairman of the hospital in Hørsholm.
