= 1998 Danish Amsterdam Treaty referendum =

- 28 May 1998
- Ratification of the Treaty of Amsterdam by Denmark

Results
Choice	Votes	%
Yes	1,647,692	55.10%
No	1,342,595	44.90%
Valid votes	2,990,287	98.15%
Invalid or blank votes	56,494	1.85%
Total votes	3,046,781	100.00%
Registered voters/turnout	3,996,333	76.24%
- Results by nomination district and constituency Yes: 50–55% 55–60% 60–65% 65–70% 70%+ No: 50–55% 55–60%

A referendum on the Amsterdam Treaty was held in Denmark on 28 May 1998. It was approved by 55.1% of voters with a turnout of 76.2%. The treaty subsequently came into effect on 1 May 1999.

== Background ==
The Danish parties and lists recommended voting as follows:

- For: Social Democrats, Social Liberal Party, Conservative People's Party, Centre Democrats, Christian Democrats (although members were free to vote as they wish) and Liberals
- Against: Socialist People's Party, June Movement, People's Movement against the EU, Danish People's Party, Progress Party and the Red-Green Alliance

== Results ==
Choice	Votes	%
For	1,647,692	55.1
Against	1,342,595	44.9
Invalid/blank votes	56,494	–
Total	3,046,781	100
Registered voters/turnout	3,996,333	76.2
Source: Nohlen & Stöver

=== By County ===
Region	For	Against	Electorate	Votes
Copenhagen & Frederiksberg Municipality	158,900	164,191	444,557	330,925
Copenhagen County	190,788	159,972	450,398	356,344
Frederiksborg County	119,897	88,414	267,409	211,610
Roskilde County	74,830	59,554	171,719	136,565
West Zealand County	86,285	80,025	222,245	169,045
Storstrøm County	79,374	73,517	200,520	155,609
Bornholm County	13,068	11,590	34,241	25,251
Fyn County	148,186	119,884	359,586	273,332
South Jutland County	82,212	62,315	189,032	146,954
Ribe County	70,532	50,830	166,102	123,695
Vejle County	108,046	84,118	259,947	195,559
Ringkjøbing County	92,013	58,040	202,723	153,211
Århus County	153,211	156,532	475,999	365,687
Viborg County	76,342	52,030	175,791	131,104
North Jutland County	145,523	121,583	376,064	271,890
Source: European Election Database
