= Socialist Workers Party (Denmark) =

Socialist Workers Party Socialistisk Arbejderparti
- Founded: 1979
- Preceded by: Revolutionary Socialists' League
- Newspaper: Socialistisk Information
- Ideology: Trotskyism; Communism
- Political position: Far-left
- National affiliation: Red–Green Alliance
- International affiliation: Fourth International
- Colours: Red

The Socialist Workers Party (Danish: Socialistisk Arbejderparti), now known as Socialist Workers Politics (Danish: Socialistisk Arbejderpolitik), is a Trotskyist political party in Denmark. SAP is the Danish section of the (reunified) Fourth International, and was founded in 1979 as a continuation of Revolutionære Socialisters Forbund (RSF) - Revolutionary Socialists' League.

SAP was a co-founder of the Red-Green Alliance in 1989 and its members are active within the Alliance.

SAP publishes the quarterly Socialistisk Information (SI).

In 2014 SAP replaced "Party" with "Politics" in their name, as they no longer contested elections.
