= Centre Democrats (Denmark) =

Danish political party

Centre Democrats Centrum-Demokraterne
- Abbreviation: CD
- Leader: Ben Haddou
- Founded: 7 November 1973
- Dissolved: 26 January 2008
- Split from: Social Democrats
- Headquarters: Omøgade 8, 2. sal 2100 København
- Youth wing: Youth of the Centre-Democrats (1982-2006/2008)
- Ideology: Social democracy Liberal conservatism
- Political position: Centre
- European Parliament group: European People's Party Group (1984–1994)
- Colours: Purple

Election symbol
- D (Note: Previously used M)

Website
- www.centrumdemokraterne.dk

The Centre Democrats (Danish: Centrum-Demokraterne, CD) were a Danish political party.

The Centre Democrats (Centrum-Demokraterne) in 1977

== History ==
The party was formed in 1973 by Erhard Jakobsen, a former MP and mayor of Gladsaxe, as a centrist splinter group from the Danish Social Democrats. It participated in both centre-right governments (1982–1988) and centre-left governments (1993–1996).

In the 2001 election, it lost its parliamentary representation, a severe setback for the party. In the 2005 election, it got 33,635 votes (1% of votes nationwide). It also ran in several municipalities in the Danish municipal election in November 2005. It also ran in simultaneous elections to the new Regional Councils, except in Region Midtjylland, where a local party official forgot to hand in the required number of voters' signatures before the deadline closed.

On 26 January 2008, an extraordinary party conference decided to dissolve the party by 1 February 2008.

== Party leaders ==
- 1973–1989: Erhard Jakobsen
- 1989–2005: Mimi Jakobsen
- 2005–2007: Bjarne Møgelhøj
- 2007–2008: Ben Haddou

== Election results ==
=== Parliament (Folketing) ===
Date	Votes			Seats	
Date	#	%	± pp	#	±
1973	236.784	7.8%	+7.8	14 / 179	New
1975	66.316	2.2%	-5.6	4 / 179	▼10
1977	200.347	6.4%	+4.2	11 / 179	▲7
1979	102.132	3.2%	-3.2	6 / 179	▼5
1981	258.522	8.3%	+5.1	15 / 179	▲9
1984	154.553	4.6%	-3.7	8 / 179	▼7
1987	161.070	4.8%	+0.2	9 / 179	▲1
1988	155.464	4.7%	-0.1	9 / 179	0
1990	165.556	5.1%	+0.4	9 / 179	0
1994	94.496	2.8%	-2.3	5 / 179	▼4
1998	146.802	4.3%	+1.5	8 / 179	▲3
2001	61.031	1.8%	-2.5	0 / 179	▼8
2005	33.880	1.0%	-0.8	0 / 179	0
2007	Did not run.				

=== Municipal elections ===
Date	Seats	
Date	#	±
2001	2 / 4,647	0
2005	0 / 2,522	▼2

=== Regional elections ===
Date	Votes	Seats	
Date	Votes	#	±
2001	24,914	3 / 374	0
2005	4,987	0 / 205	▼3

=== European Parliament elections ===
Date	Votes			Seats	
Date	#	%	± pp	#	±
1979	107.790	6.1%	+6.1	1 / 15	New
1984	131.984	6.6%	+0.5	1 / 15	0
1989	142.190	8.0%	+1.4	2 / 16	▲1
1994	18.365	0.9%	-7.1	0 / 16	▼2
1999	68.717	3.5%	+2.6	0 / 16	0
2004	Did not run.				
