= 2022 Danish European Union opt-out referendum =

Danish European Union opt-out referendum
- 1 June 2022
- Do you vote yes or no on Denmark being able to participate in the European defence and security co-operation by abolishing the EU defence opt-out?

Results
Choice	Votes	%
Yes	1,848,242	66.87%
No	915,717	33.13%
Valid votes	2,763,959	98.62%
Invalid or blank votes	38,558	1.38%
Total votes	2,802,517	100.00%
Registered voters/turnout	4,260,944	65.77%
- Results of the referendum Yes: 50–55% 55–60% 60–65% 65–70% 70–75% 75–80% 80%+ No: 50–55% 55–60% 60–65%

A referendum on the abolition of the defence opt-out, one of the country's opt-outs from the European Union, was held in Denmark on 1 June 2022. (Note: The vote did not take place on the Faroe Islands or Greenland, which are not part of the European Union. See Faroe Islands and the European Union, Greenland and the European Union, and withdrawal of Greenland from the European Communities for details.) The referendum was announced on 6 March 2022 following a broad multi-party defence agreement reached during the 2022 Russian invasion of Ukraine. The referendum question was answered positively with the "Yes" side securing just over two-thirds of the vote.

== Background ==
After the rejection of the Maastricht Treaty in the 1992 referendum, the Edinburgh Agreement was reached, granting Denmark four opt-outs from European Union (EU) policies, including one on defence matters. This compromise allowed Denmark to ratify the Maastricht Treaty in 1993. The defence opt-out meant that Denmark did not participate in the Common Security and Defence Policy or EU military operations. In addition, the opt-out excluded Denmark from decision-making processes in the EU related to military operations.

The Russian invasion of Ukraine in February 2022 sent shockwaves across Europe, prompting countries to reassess their security and defence strategies. In response, the Danish government, under Prime Minister Mette Frederiksen, reconsidered Denmark’s longstanding opt-out from EU defence cooperation. The government and EU officials viewed Denmark's potential alignment with EU defence policies as essential for strengthening Europe’s security framework. Less than two weeks after Russia's invasion, Frederiksen called for a referendum to abolish the defence opt-out, marking what was seen as a decisive shift in Denmark's defence policy.

This was the third referendum held on Denmark's EU opt-outs. In 2000, the Danish electorate rejected the adoption of the euro as national currency, and in 2015, a proposal to modify the justice opt-out was also rejected.

For a referendum to be rejected, a majority of participating voters must vote against it, and those voting against must constitute at least 30% of the total electorate. However, the parties supporting the defence agreement agreed that the result would be respected regardless of voter turnout.

== Campaign ==
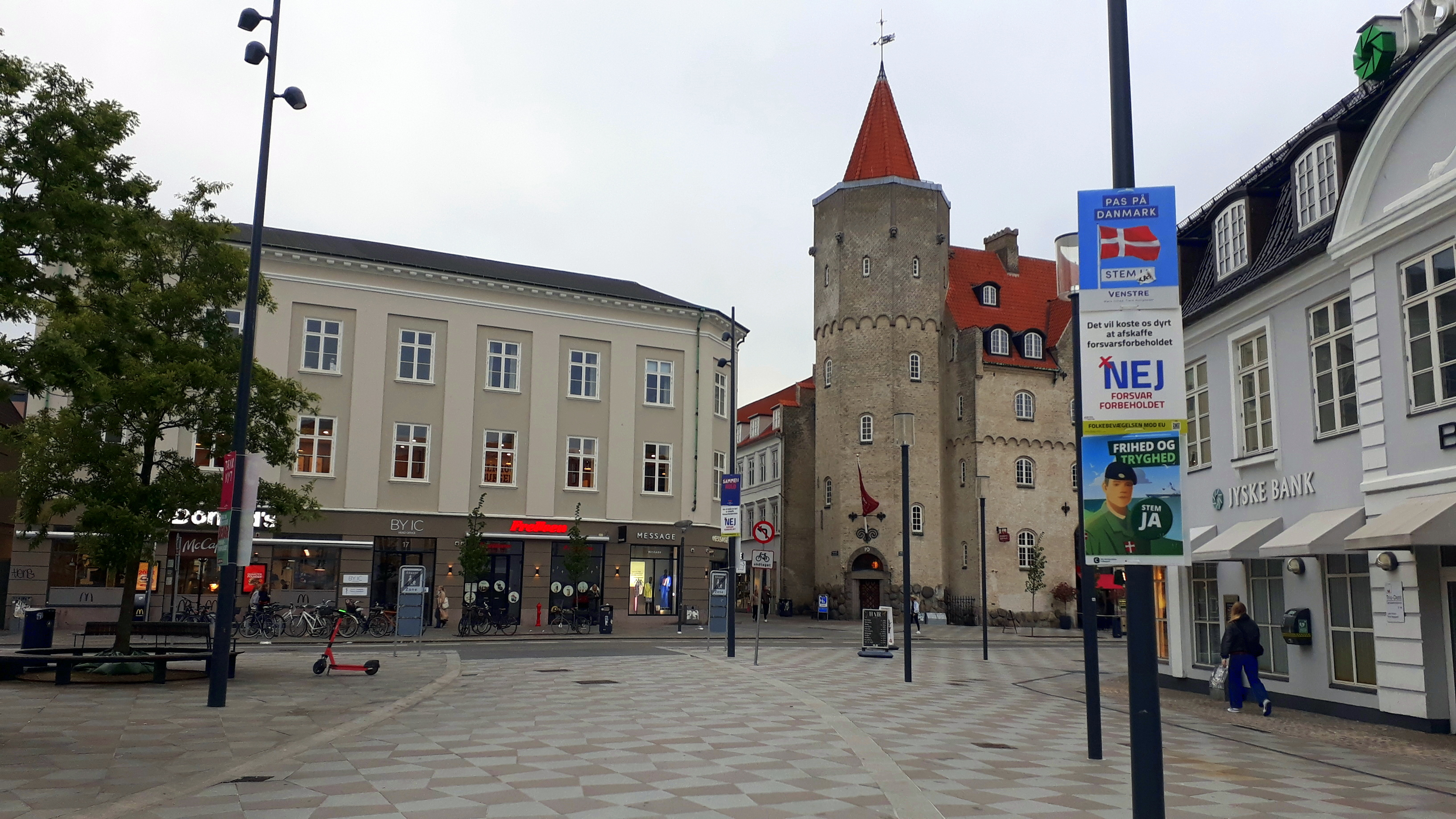
Campaign posters on Nytorv in Ålborg, North Jutland

The defence agreement was signed and presented by the leaders of the Social Democrats, Venstre, Socialist People's Party, Social Liberal Party, and the Conservative People's Party. The parties supporting the agreement also backed measures to increase defence spending and reduce Denmark's reliance on Russian gas. The Liberal Alliance and the Christian Democrats also endorsed the "Yes" option, while the Independent Greens voted in favor but did not issued a recommendation to voters. Opposing the abolition of the opt-out, the Danish People's Party, New Right, Young Conservatives and the Red–Green Alliance endorsed the vote "No".

Position	Political parties
Yes	Social Democrats
Yes	Venstre
Yes	Green Left
Yes	Liberal Alliance
Yes	Conservatives
Yes	Social Liberals
Yes	Christian Democrats
No	Red–Green Alliance
No	New Right
No	Danish People's Party
Neutral	Independent Greens

On 30 March, the Danish Foreign Ministry released two bills (draft laws) for organising the referendum and joining the Common Security and Defence Policy (CSDP). Following this, the wording of the referendum question, which did not mention the European Union nor the opt-out, (Note: Do you vote for or against Denmark's participation in the European defence and security co-operation? Danish: Stemmer du ja eller nej til, at Danmark kan deltage i det europæiske samarbejde om sikkerhed og forsvar? (Forslag til lov om Danmarks deltagelse i det europæiske samarbejde om sikkerhed og forsvar)) was criticised by the Danish People's Party and the Red-Green Alliance. Jeppe Kofod, Denmark's Foreign Minister, defended the original wording, emphasising that the vote was about aligning Denmark with the other 26 EU member states. However, following the criticism, Kofod announced a revised wording on 7 April, which read: "Do you vote for or against Denmark's participation in the European defence and security co-operation by abolishing the EU defence opt-out?"

There were concerns that eliminating the opt-out and participating in the CSDP could eventually lead to Denmark having to join a future European army if one were created. Foreign Minister Kofod committed that any such change would require treaty revisions, which would require approval by the Danish people in a new referendum.

=== Television debates ===
Four major television debates involving the leaders of parties represented in the Folketing were held.

Date	Organisers	Venue	P Present S Surrogate NI Not invited I Invited												
Date	Organisers	Venue	Yes										No		
Date	Organisers	Venue	A	V	F	B	C	I	Q	Å	K	M	Ø	O	D
11 May	DR1	War Museum, Copenhagen	P Frederiksen	P Ellemann	P Olsen Dyhr	P Carsten Nielsen	P Pape	P Vanopslagh	P Siddique	P Rosenkilde	P Arendt (Note: Arendt resigned as party leader during the campaign on 17 May.)	P Løkke	P Villadsen	P Messerschmidt	P Vermund
18 May	TV 2 News	Dokk1, Aarhus	S Bødskov	P Ellemann	P Olsen Dyhr	NI	NI	NI	NI	NI	NI	NI	P Villadsen	P Messerschmidt	NI
29 May	TV2	Christiansborg, Copenhagen	P Frederiksen	P Ellemann	P Olsen Dyhr	P Carsten Nielsen	P Pape	P Vanopslagh	P Siddique	P Rosenkilde	P Karlsmose	P Løkke	P Villadsen	P Messerschmidt	P Vermund
31 May	DR1	DR Koncerthuset, Copenhagen	P Frederiksen	P Ellemann	P Olsen Dyhr	P Carsten Nielsen	P Pape	P Vanopslagh	P Siddique	P Rosenkilde	P Karlsmose	P Løkke	P Villadsen	P Messerschmidt	P Vermund

== Opinion polls ==
Date(s)	Polling agency	Sample	Yes	No	Undecided	Lead
30 May 2022	Epinion		44%	28%	19%	16%
27–30 May 2022	Voxmeter	1,091	53%	28%	19%	25%
23–27 May 2022	Voxmeter	2,008	51%	27%	22%	24%
16–22 May 2022	Voxmeter		45.5%	30%	24.6%	15.5%
9 May 2022	Epinion		38%	27%	35%	11%
6 May 2022	Megafon	1,009	39%	26%	35%	13%
20–27 April 2022	Epinion	2,090	39%	26%	35%	13%
18–24 April 2022	Voxmeter		39.5%	32.1%	28.4%	7.4%
4–10 April 2022	Voxmeter/Ritzau		38.8%	32.4%	28.8%	6.4%
31 March – 7 April 2022	Epinion	2,102	36%	27%	37%	9%
28 March – 3 April 2022	Voxmeter/Ritzau	1,007	39.2%	35.8%	25%	3.4%
22–28 March 2022	Voxmeter	1,000	40.3%	35.4%	24.3%	4.9%
14–20 March 2022	Voxmeter	1,509	38.2%	30.9%	30.9%	7.3%
6–20 March 2022	Wilke	1,000	42%	30%	28%	12%
8–15 March 2022	Epinion	1,020	38%	23%	39%	15%
7–11 March 2022	Voxmeter	1,509	44.2%	28.7%	27.1%	15.5%
7–8 March 2022	Megafon	2,054	55%	23%	22%	32%
6 March: The government of Prime Minister Mette Frederiksen announces a referendum on the Danish defence opt-out to be held on 1 June.
3–4 March 2022 (Note: The wording of the question differs from the referendum: "Drop the defence opt-out and join a joint EU army?")	Megafon	1,092	49%	27%	23%	22%

== Results ==
The result meant that 43.38% of the registered electorate had voted for the proposal, and 21.49% had voted against.

Choice	Votes	%
For	1,848,242	66.87
Against	915,717	33.13
Total	2,763,959	100.00
Valid votes	2,763,959	98.62
Invalid votes	5,819	0.21
Blank votes	32,739	1.17
Total votes	2,802,517	100.00
Registered voters/turnout	4,260,944	65.77
Source: Denmark Statistics

=== By constituency ===
District	For		Against		Valid	Blank	Invalid	Total
District	Votes	%	Votes	%	Valid	Blank	Invalid	Total
Capital Region of Denmark	581,703	69.5%	254,874	30.5%	836,577	10,007	1,775	848,359
Copenhagen	235,847	69.4%	104,221	30.6%	340,068	5,108	827	346,003
1. Østerbro	27,096	74.1%	9,467	25.9%	36,563	510	82	37,155
2. Sundbyvester	21,591	69.7%	9,395	30.3%	30,986	428	90	31,504
3. Indre By	19,612	74.5%	6,710	25.5%	26,322	365	81	26,768
4. Sundbyøster	17,135	67.9%	8,100	32.1%	25,235	357	62	25,654
5. Nørrebro	22,004	65.3%	11,672	34.7%	33,676	715	87	34,478
6. Bispebjerg	12,065	60.5%	7,885	39.5%	19,950	400	60	20,410
7. Brønshøj	22,649	67.2%	11,053	32.8%	33,702	498	82	34,282
8. Valby	16,844	67.8%	7,987	32.2%	24,831	352	74	25,257
9. Vesterbro	22,042	69.6%	9,614	30.4%	31,656	570	78	32,304
10. Falkoner	20,180	76.7%	6,126	23.3%	26,306	344	39	26,689
11. Slots	17,313	72.1%	6,684	27.9%	23,997	327	52	24,376
12. Tårnby	17,316	64.5%	9,528	35.5%	26,844	242	40	27,126
Greater Copenhagen	160,842	68.1%	75,490	31.9%	236,342	2,407	508	239,257
1. Gentofte	29,382	80.2%	7,268	19.8%	36,650	287	66	37,003
2. Lyngby	22,099	77.6%	6,378	22.4%	28,477	296	53	28,826
3. Gladsaxe	20,642	69.1%	9,244	30.9%	29,886	344	52	30,282
4. Rødovre	18,978	64.4%	10,506	35.6%	29,484	343	60	29,887
5. Hvidovre	14,015	62.9%	8,260	37.1%	22,275	242	24	22,541
6. Brøndby	16,091	60.0%	10,738	40.0%	26,829	233	81	27,143
7. Taastrup	18,831	61.8%	11,625	38.2%	30,456	292	74	30,822
8. Ballerup	20,814	64.5%	11,471	35.5%	32,285	370	98	32,753
North Zealand	172,177	71.8%	67,611	28.2%	239,788	2,176	396	242,360
1. Helsingør	21,396	69.3%	9,488	30.7%	30,884	290	64	31,238
2. Fredensborg	25,446	75.8%	8,121	24.2%	33,567	247	29	33,843
3. Hillerød	32,921	68.2%	15,334	31.8%	48,255	470	61	48,786
4. Frederikssund	24,668	63.4%	14,262	36.6%	38,930	404	91	39,425
5. Egedal	32,324	73.7%	11,547	26.3%	43,871	407	63	44,341
6. Rudersdal	35,422	80.0%	8,859	20.0%	44,281	358	88	44,727
Bornholm	12,827	62.9%	7,552	37.1%	20,379	316	44	20,739
1. Rønne	6,390	63.3%	3,699	36.7%	10,089	167	21	10,277
2. Aakirkeby	6,437	62.6%	3,853	37.4%	10,290	149	23	10,462
Region Zealand & Region of Southern Denmark	646,102	64.6%	354,611	35.4%	1,000,713	11,340	2,183	1,014,236
Zealand	265,947	64.0%	149,567	36.0%	415,514	4,428	837	420,779
1. Lolland	11,245	59.2%	7,758	40.8%	19,003	220	63	19,286
2. Guldborgsund	18,635	61.3%	11,747	38.7%	30,382	357	82	30,821
3. Vordingborg	14,973	62.8%	8,879	37.2%	23,852	270	38	24,160
4. Næstved	25,668	62.5%	15,394	37.5%	41,062	423	74	41,559
5. Faxe	18,740	61.7%	11,640	38.3%	30,380	287	89	30,756
6. Køge	29,952	66.6%	15,042	33.4%	44,994	537	72	45,603
7. Greve	23,601	67.7%	11,240	32.3%	34,841	283	55	35,179
8. Roskilde	32,809	72.0%	12,767	28.0%	45,576	521	79	46,176
9. Holbæk	22,771	64.2%	12,704	35.8%	35,475	380	76	35,931
10. Kalundborg	24,685	60.0%	16,460	40.0%	41,145	423	91	41,659
11. Ringsted	20,232	64.0%	11,385	36.0%	31,617	387	59	32,063
12. Slagelse	22,636	60.9%	14,551	39.1%	37,187	340	59	37,586
Funen	165,365	67.3%	80,211	32.7%	245,576	3,166	576	249,318
1. Odense Øst	20,137	66.6%	10,084	33.4%	30,221	473	96	30,790
2. Odense Vest	19,795	68.4%	9,162	31.6%	28,957	381	71	29,409
3. Odense Syd	25,484	72.6%	9,600	27.4%	35,084	483	83	35,650
4. Assens	13,840	66.0%	7,131	34.0%	20,971	237	57	21,265
5. Middelfart	23,544	66.0%	12,125	34.0%	35,669	396	93	36,158
6. Nyborg	18,800	65.8%	9,778	34.2%	28,578	365	48	28,991
7. Svendborg	23,954	65.4%	12,656	34.6%	36,610	473	78	37,161
8. Faaborg	19,811	67.2%	9,675	32.8%	29,486	358	50	29,894
South Jutland	214,790	63.2%	124,833	36.8%	339,623	3,746	770	344,139
1. Sønderborg	22,352	63.5%	12,853	36.5%	35,205	379	93	35,677
2. Aabenraa	16,458	61.3%	10,410	38.7%	26,868	277	56	27,201
3. Tønder	10,295	60.6%	6,700	39.4%	16,995	217	42	17,254
4. Esbjerg By	16,859	59.1%	11,686	40.9%	28,545	289	60	28,894
5. Esbjerg Omegn	16,651	63.8%	9,432	36.2%	26,083	258	44	26,385
6. Varde	14,852	63.1%	8,698	36.9%	23,550	268	64	23,882
7. Vejen	19,486	61.7%	12,109	38.3%	31,595	384	78	32,057
8. Vejle Nord	18,950	68.5%	8,722	31.5%	27,672	296	78	28,046
9. Vejle Syd	18,714	67.2%	9,147	32.8%	27,861	342	75	28,278
10. Fredericia	15,271	62.2%	9,268	37.8%	24,539	276	59	24,874
11. Kolding Nord	13,754	67.3%	6,697	32.7%	20,451	203	43	20,697
12. Kolding Syd	14,738	63.4%	8,502	36.6%	23,240	257	35	23,532
13. Haderslev	16,410	60.7%	10,609	39.3%	27,019	300	43	27,362
Central Denmark & North Denmark Regions	620,437	67.0%	306,232	33.0%	926,669	11,392	1,861	939,922
East Jutland	274,182	69.5%	120,265	30.5%	394,447	5,175	837	400,459
1. Århus Syd	30,136	74.6%	10,286	25.4%	40,422	598	101	41,121
2. Århus Vest	26,101	69.6%	11,390	30.4%	37,491	528	95	38,114
3. Århus Nord	29,341	71.8%	11,518	28.2%	40,859	719	120	41,698
4. Århus Øst	40,275	77.0%	12,063	23.0%	52,338	862	132	53,332
5. Djurs	26,056	65.1%	13,958	34.9%	40,014	374	71	40,459
6. Randers Nord	13,466	61.5%	8,435	38.5%	21,901	225	46	22,172
7. Randers Syd	15,418	64.2%	8,592	35.8%	24,010	243	42	24,295
8. Favrskov	17,104	69.4%	7,527	30.6%	24,631	257	43	24,931
9. Skanderborg	34,031	72.0%	13,214	28.0%	47,245	576	53	47,874
10. Horsens	27,296	64.7%	14,887	35.3%	42,183	479	93	42,755
11. Hedensted	14,958	64.1%	8,395	35.9%	23,353	314	41	23,708
West Jutland	168,770	66.3%	85,772	33.7%	254,542	3,092	465	258,099
1. Struer	13,526	65.6%	7,106	34.4%	20,632	226	44	20,902
2. Skive	14,251	62.8%	8,427	37.2%	22,678	277	35	22,990
3. Viborg Vest	16,218	66.8%	8,052	33.2%	24,270	332	58	24,660
4. Viborg Øst	14,892	67.1%	7,294	32.9%	22,186	268	45	22,499
5. Silkeborg Nord	15,996	67.2%	7,797	32.8%	23,793	296	43	24,132
6. Silkeborg Syd	18,202	71.5%	7,273	28.5%	25,475	325	48	25,848
7. Ikast	11,781	63.2%	6,866	36.8%	18,647	214	29	18,890
8. Herning Syd	12,471	65.7%	6,504	34.3%	18,975	215	38	19,228
9. Herning Nord	15,293	66.7%	7,638	33.3%	22,931	270	23	23,224
10. Holstebro	18,529	66.1%	9,482	33.9%	28,011	341	51	28,403
11. Ringkøbing	17,611	65.4%	9,333	34.6%	26,944	328	51	27,323
North Jutland	177,485	63.9%	100,195	36.1%	277,680	3,125	559	281,364
1. Frederikshavn	17,159	58.4%	12,245	41.6%	29,404	251	130	29,785
2. Hjørring	18,894	62.8%	11,187	37.2%	30,081	315	72	30,468
3. Brønderslev	22,239	62.3%	13,450	37.7%	35,689	421	53	36,163
4. Thisted	18,481	62.3%	11,168	37.7%	29,649	331	55	30,035
5. Himmerland	20,651	65.2%	11,014	34.8%	31,665	335	54	32,054
6. Mariagerfjord	12,339	61.9%	7,579	38.1%	19,918	197	42	20,157
7. Aalborg Øst	25,578	66.3%	12,987	33.7%	38,565	503	55	39,123
8. Aalborg Vest	21,855	69.0%	9,801	31.0%	31,656	401	41	32,098
9. Aalborg Nord	20,289	65.3%	10,764	34.7%	31,053	371	57	31,481
Denmark	1,848,242	66.9%	915,717	33.1%	2,763,959	32,739	5,819	2,802,517
Source: Denmark Statistics

== Aftermath ==
Exit polls released by national broadcasters DR and TV 2 immediately after polls closed at 20:00 CEST (18:00 UTC) indicated that a large majority of the electorate had voted "Yes". This was the first time that Denmark had ever abolished one of its EU opt-outs. It was also the highest share of the vote ever received by the "Yes" side in an EU-referendum, with the result being described by some as a landslide. The turnout, at 65.8%, was among the lowest for any EU referendum in Denmark, with only the 2014 Danish Unified Patent Court membership referendum having had a lower turnout. Election scholars expressed concern and attributed the low turnout to some political parties being hesitant to campaign actively, as well as opinion polls that consistently showed a strong lead for the "Yes" side.

=== Reactions ===
Prime Minister Mette Frederiksen commented that she was "very very happy" for the result, stating that Denmark had sent a very important signal to its allies and a clear signal to Vladimir Putin. She also praised the cooperation with the other parties that had supported the "Yes" campaign. Frederiksen emphasized that there were no plans to abolish Denmark's remaining opt-outs, promising that the referendum had been "about the defence opt-out and nothing else". Venstre leader Jakob Ellemann-Jensen said that the vote sent a clear result that other countries could count on Denmark. He then focused on the next Danish general election, saying that the country's right-wing should work together to give Denmark a new government.

Morten Messerschmidt commented that the result showed that the Danish People's Party was alive. He said that many people's votes were "influenced by the war in Ukraine". Political Spokesperson of Red–Green Alliance, Mai Villadsen, said that she had "very great respect" for the result of the election. She mentioned that many of the party's voters had voted "Yes", and promised that the party would remain engaged with defence policy.

==== International reactions ====
- European Union: Commission President Ursula von der Leyen welcomed the result and said that Denmark and the EU "would benefit from the decision". President of the European Council Charles Michel stated that the decision would strengthen Europe and "make both the EU and the Danish people safer and stronger."
- France: President Emmanuel Macron said that it was a "fantastic news for our Europe" and that "we are stronger together".

=== Developments ===
With the end of the EU defence opt-out effective from 1 July 2022, the Danish government had the power to request Denmark's participation in the European Defence Agency and Permanent Structured Cooperation. On 23 March 2023, the Danish Parliament approved participation in the EDA and PESCO. PESCO members voted on Danish participation on 23 May 2023, confirming Denmark's participation in PESCO, Denmark becoming its 26th member.
