= Varde (nomination district) =

- Varde
- Nomination district constituency for the Folketing
- Location of Varde within South Jutland

- Location of South Jutland within Denmark
- Municipalities: Varde
- Constituency: South Jutland
- Electorate: 35,999 (2022)

Current constituency
- Created: 1849 (as constituency); 1920 (as nomination district)

Varde nominating district is one of the 92 nominating districts that exists for Danish elections following the 2007 municipal reform. It consists of Varde Municipality. It was created in 1849 as a constituency, and has been a nomination district since 1920, though its boundaries have been changed since then.

In general elections, the district is a very strong area for parties commonly associated with the blue bloc, with those parties winning their fourth highest vote share of any district in the 2022 election.

== General elections results ==
=== General elections in the 2020s ===
2022 Danish general election

Parties	Vote		
Parties	Votes	%	+ / -
Social Democrats	7,276	24.20	+1.82
Venstre	6,965	23.17	-11.92
Denmark Democrats	4,272	14.21	New
Moderates	2,522	8.39	New
Liberal Alliance	2,035	6.77	+4.18
New Right	1,947	6.48	+2.57
Conservatives	1,570	5.22	+0.81
Green Left	1,188	3.95	+0.01
Danish People's Party	768	2.55	-10.75
Social Liberals	461	1.53	-2.98
Red–Green Alliance	442	1.47	-1.45
The Alternative	288	0.96	-0.29
Christian Democrats	277	0.92	-2.05
Independent Greens	40	0.13	New
Kent Nielsen	12	0.04	New
Kenneth Vestergaard	2	0.01	New
Total	30,065		

=== General elections in the 2010s ===
2019 Danish general election

Parties	Vote		
Parties	Votes	%	+ / -
Venstre	10,684	35.09	+2.35
Social Democrats	6,813	22.38	+3.65
Danish People's Party	4,050	13.30	-15.22
Social Liberals	1,373	4.51	+2.12
Conservatives	1,343	4.41	+2.79
Green Left	1,198	3.94	+1.65
New Right	1,191	3.91	New
Christian Democrats	904	2.97	+1.49
Red–Green Alliance	888	2.92	-0.74
Liberal Alliance	789	2.59	-4.08
Stram Kurs	570	1.87	New
The Alternative	380	1.25	-0.68
Klaus Riskær Pedersen Party	245	0.80	New
Michael Thomsen	16	0.05	New
Total	30,444		

2015 Danish general election

Parties	Vote		
Parties	Votes	%	+ / -
Venstre	10,327	32.74	-10.16
Danish People's Party	8,996	28.52	+14.28
Social Democrats	5,907	18.73	-0.11
Liberal Alliance	2,103	6.67	+2.17
Red–Green Alliance	1,153	3.66	+0.90
Social Liberals	753	2.39	-3.71
Green Left	721	2.29	-3.60
The Alternative	608	1.93	New
Conservatives	510	1.62	-1.40
Christian Democrats	467	1.48	-0.25
Total	31,545		

2011 Danish general election

Parties	Vote		
Parties	Votes	%	+ / -
Venstre	13,630	42.90	-2.94
Social Democrats	5,985	18.84	+0.49
Danish People's Party	4,525	14.24	+0.21
Social Liberals	1,937	6.10	+2.58
Green Left	1,871	5.89	-1.75
Liberal Alliance	1,430	4.50	+2.97
Conservatives	961	3.02	-4.18
Red–Green Alliance	878	2.76	+2.22
Christian Democrats	551	1.73	+0.39
Jørn Bjorholm	2	0.01	New
Niesl-Aage Bjerre	1	0.00	New
Total	31,771		

=== General elections in the 2000s ===
2007 Danish general election

Parties	Vote		
Parties	Votes	%	+ / -
Venstre	14,405	45.84	+0.56
Social Democrats	5,765	18.35	-0.54
Danish People's Party	4,410	14.03	+0.55
Green Left	2,401	7.64	+4.56
Conservatives	2,261	7.20	-1.47
Social Liberals	1,106	3.52	-2.10
New Alliance	482	1.53	New
Christian Democrats	421	1.34	-1.59
Red–Green Alliance	171	0.54	-0.51
Total	31,422		

2005 Danish general election

Parties	Vote		
Parties	Votes	%	+ / -
Venstre	11,759	45.28	-1.66
Social Democrats	4,904	18.89	-3.76
Danish People's Party	3,501	13.48	+1.52
Conservatives	2,252	8.67	+2.04
Social Liberals	1,459	5.62	+2.54
Green Left	801	3.08	+0.10
Christian Democrats	761	2.93	-0.48
Red–Green Alliance	272	1.05	+0.47
Centre Democrats	218	0.84	-0.22
Minority Party	40	0.15	New
Total	25,967		

2001 Danish general election

Parties	Vote		
Parties	Votes	%	+ / -
Venstre	12,712	46.94	+7.14
Social Democrats	6,133	22.65	-4.09
Danish People's Party	3,240	11.96	+5.19
Conservatives	1,796	6.63	-2.60
Christian People's Party	923	3.41	-0.64
Social Liberals	833	3.08	+0.48
Green Left	808	2.98	-0.66
Centre Democrats	288	1.06	-2.59
Progress Party	188	0.69	-1.72
Red–Green Alliance	158	0.58	-0.24
Total	27,079		

=== General elections in the 1990s ===
1998 Danish general election

Parties	Vote		
Parties	Votes	%	+ / -
Venstre	10,602	39.80	-0.60
Social Democrats	7,122	26.74	+1.19
Conservatives	2,458	9.23	-3.27
Danish People's Party	1,803	6.77	New
Christian People's Party	1,078	4.05	+0.99
Centre Democrats	972	3.65	+1.43
Green Left	969	3.64	+0.57
Social Liberals	693	2.60	-1.60
Progress Party	641	2.41	-5.57
Red–Green Alliance	218	0.82	-0.20
Democratic Renewal	70	0.26	New
Jørn Janby	11	0.04	New
Total	26,637		

1994 Danish general election

Parties	Vote		
Parties	Votes	%	+ / -
Venstre	10,431	40.40	+8.83
Social Democrats	6,596	25.55	-0.59
Conservatives	3,228	12.50	-3.04
Progress Party	2,059	7.98	-0.61
Social Liberals	1,084	4.20	+1.10
Green Left	792	3.07	-0.36
Christian People's Party	790	3.06	-1.27
Centre Democrats	574	2.22	-2.42
Red–Green Alliance	264	1.02	+0.60
Total	25,818		

1990 Danish general election

Parties	Vote		
Parties	Votes	%	+ / -
Venstre	7,957	31.57	+2.86
Social Democrats	6,587	26.14	+5.86
Conservatives	3,916	15.54	-2.75
Progress Party	2,164	8.59	-2.57
Centre Democrats	1,169	4.64	-0.37
Christian People's Party	1,092	4.33	+0.38
Green Left	864	3.43	-2.29
Social Liberals	781	3.10	-1.50
Common Course	321	1.27	+0.06
The Greens	130	0.52	-0.17
Justice Party of Denmark	115	0.46	New
Red–Green Alliance	106	0.42	New
Total	25,202		

=== General elections in the 1980s ===
1988 Danish general election

Parties	Vote		
Parties	Votes	%	+ / -
Venstre	7,432	28.71	+0.78
Social Democrats	5,249	20.28	-0.96
Conservatives	4,735	18.29	-2.18
Progress Party	2,888	11.16	+4.58
Green Left	1,481	5.72	-0.71
Centre Democrats	1,298	5.01	+0.01
Social Liberals	1,190	4.60	-0.21
Christian People's Party	1,022	3.95	-0.49
Common Course	314	1.21	0.00
The Greens	178	0.69	0.00
Communist Party of Denmark	53	0.20	-0.02
Left Socialists	43	0.17	-0.18
Total	25,883		

1987 Danish general election

Parties	Vote		
Parties	Votes	%	+ / -
Venstre	7,271	27.93	-1.74
Social Democrats	5,530	21.24	+0.48
Conservatives	5,328	20.47	-2.28
Progress Party	1,714	6.58	+1.48
Green Left	1,674	6.43	+1.39
Centre Democrats	1,302	5.00	-0.53
Social Liberals	1,253	4.81	+0.59
Christian People's Party	1,157	4.44	-0.60
Common Course	316	1.21	New
The Greens	180	0.69	New
Justice Party of Denmark	123	0.47	-0.70
Left Socialists	91	0.35	-0.20
Communist Party of Denmark	57	0.22	+0.09
Humanist Party	23	0.09	New
Socialist Workers Party	8	0.03	0.00
Marxist–Leninists Party	5	0.02	0.00
Total	26,032		

1984 Danish general election

Parties	Vote		
Parties	Votes	%	+ / -
Venstre	7,675	29.67	-1.86
Conservatives	5,884	22.75	+7.54
Social Democrats	5,371	20.76	-2.12
Centre Democrats	1,430	5.53	-7.19
Progress Party	1,319	5.10	New
Green Left	1,304	5.04	-0.16
Christian People's Party	1,303	5.04	-0.02
Social Liberals	1,092	4.22	-0.30
Justice Party of Denmark	302	1.17	-0.49
Left Socialists	142	0.55	-0.16
Communist Party of Denmark	33	0.13	-0.18
Socialist Workers Party	8	0.03	-0.06
Marxist–Leninists Party	5	0.02	New
Total	25,868		

1981 Danish general election

Parties	Vote		
Parties	Votes	%	+ / -
Venstre	7,251	31.53	+2.35
Social Democrats	5,263	22.88	-2.47
Conservatives	3,497	15.21	+4.93
Centre Democrats	2,926	12.72	+8.59
Green Left	1,195	5.20	+2.36
Christian People's Party	1,163	5.06	+0.07
Social Liberals	1,040	4.52	+0.43
Justice Party of Denmark	381	1.66	-0.50
Left Socialists	163	0.71	-0.38
Communist Party of Denmark	71	0.31	-0.15
Communist Workers Party	27	0.12	-0.14
Socialist Workers Party	21	0.09	New
Total	22,998		

=== General elections in the 1970s ===
1979 Danish general election

Parties	Vote		
Parties	Votes	%	+ / -
Venstre	6,986	29.18	-0.38
Social Democrats	6,068	25.35	+3.22
Progress Party	3,633	15.18	-4.45
Conservatives	2,462	10.28	+4.16
Christian People's Party	1,195	4.99	-1.06
Centre Democrats	988	4.13	-1.89
Social Liberals	978	4.09	+0.52
Green Left	680	2.84	+1.18
Justice Party of Denmark	516	2.16	-0.46
Left Socialists	260	1.09	+0.27
Communist Party of Denmark	110	0.46	-0.78
Communist Workers Party	62	0.26	New
Total	23,938		

1977 Danish general election

Parties	Vote		
Parties	Votes	%	+ / -
Venstre	6,754	29.56	-12.52
Social Democrats	5,057	22.13	+5.74
Progress Party	4,486	19.63	+2.36
Conservatives	1,398	6.12	+2.68
Christian People's Party	1,383	6.05	-2.31
Centre Democrats	1,375	6.02	+4.23
Social Liberals	816	3.57	-2.15
Justice Party of Denmark	599	2.62	+1.25
Green Left	380	1.66	0.00
Communist Party of Denmark	284	1.24	-0.05
Left Socialists	188	0.82	+0.19
Pensioners' Party	129	0.56	New
Total	22,849		

1975 Danish general election

Parties	Vote		
Parties	Votes	%	+ / -
Venstre	9,308	42.08	+10.95
Progress Party	3,821	17.27	-0.48
Social Democrats	3,626	16.39	+1.17
Christian People's Party	1,849	8.36	+1.79
Social Liberals	1,265	5.72	-5.75
Conservatives	762	3.44	-2.82
Centre Democrats	396	1.79	-3.68
Green Left	367	1.66	-0.48
Justice Party of Denmark	303	1.37	-1.31
Communist Party of Denmark	286	1.29	+0.54
Left Socialists	139	0.63	+0.07
Total	22,122		

1973 Danish general election

Parties	Vote		
Parties	Votes	%	+ / -
Venstre	6,765	31.13	-10.52
Progress Party	3,856	17.75	New
Social Democrats	3,307	15.22	-8.71
Social Liberals	2,492	11.47	-2.02
Christian People's Party	1,428	6.57	+2.33
Conservatives	1,361	6.26	-3.21
Centre Democrats	1,188	5.47	New
Justice Party of Denmark	582	2.68	+0.05
Green Left	465	2.14	-1.40
Communist Party of Denmark	163	0.75	+0.31
Left Socialists	122	0.56	-0.04
Total	21,729		

1971 Danish general election

Parties	Vote		
Parties	Votes	%	+ / -
Venstre	8,477	41.65	-3.56
Social Democrats	4,870	23.93	+1.49
Social Liberals	2,745	13.49	+0.25
Conservatives	1,927	9.47	-3.30
Christian People's Party	863	4.24	New
Green Left	721	3.54	+1.24
Justice Party of Denmark	536	2.63	+0.98
Left Socialists	123	0.60	-0.07
Communist Party of Denmark	89	0.44	+0.25
Total	20,351		

=== General elections in the 1960s ===
1968 Danish general election

Parties	Vote		
Parties	Votes	%	+ / -
Venstre	8,060	45.21	-0.08
Social Democrats	4,000	22.44	-4.73
Social Liberals	2,361	13.24	+6.47
Conservatives	2,277	12.77	+0.90
Green Left	410	2.30	-1.27
Justice Party of Denmark	294	1.65	-0.16
Liberal Centre	176	0.99	-0.46
Left Socialists	119	0.67	New
Independent Party	98	0.55	-1.38
Communist Party of Denmark	33	0.19	+0.04
Total	17,828		

1966 Danish general election

Parties	Vote		
Parties	Votes	%	+ / -
Venstre	7,922	45.29	-2.35
Social Democrats	4,753	27.17	-0.48
Conservatives	2,076	11.87	+0.01
Social Liberals	1,185	6.77	+2.17
Green Left	624	3.57	+2.15
Independent Party	337	1.93	-0.35
Justice Party of Denmark	317	1.81	-1.62
Liberal Centre	253	1.45	New
Communist Party of Denmark	26	0.15	-0.08
Total	17,493		

1964 Danish general election

Parties	Vote		
Parties	Votes	%	+ / -
Venstre	8,076	47.64	-1.29
Social Democrats	4,688	27.65	+2.00
Conservatives	2,011	11.86	+2.50
Social Liberals	780	4.60	-0.71
Justice Party of Denmark	581	3.43	-1.02
Independent Party	387	2.28	New
Green Left	241	1.42	-0.44
Peace Politics People's Party	105	0.62	New
Danish Unity	45	0.27	New
Communist Party of Denmark	39	0.23	-0.02
Total	16,953		

1960 Danish general election

Parties	Vote		
Parties	Votes	%	+ / -
Venstre	7,719	48.93	+10.65
Social Democrats	4,046	25.65	+5.82
Conservatives	1,477	9.36	-5.38
Social Liberals	837	5.31	-3.49
Justice Party of Denmark	702	4.45	-5.01
Schleswig Party	661	4.19	New
Green Left	293	1.86	New
Communist Party of Denmark	39	0.25	-4.60
Total	15,774		

=== General elections in the 1950s ===
1957 Danish general election

Parties	Vote		
Parties	Votes	%	+ / -
Venstre	6,432	38.28	-16.71
Social Democrats	3,331	19.83	-2.71
Conservatives	2,477	14.74	+9.51
Justice Party of Denmark	1,590	9.46	+2.85
Social Liberals	1,479	8.80	+1.91
Communist Party of Denmark	815	4.85	+3.78
Independent Party	677	4.03	+1.37
Total	16,801		

September 1953 Danish Folketing election

Parties	Vote		
Parties	Votes	%	+ / -
Venstre	8,092	54.99	+1.92
Social Democrats	3,317	22.54	+0.13
Social Liberals	1,014	6.89	-0.76
Justice Party of Denmark	972	6.61	-2.10
Conservatives	770	5.23	-1.02
Independent Party	392	2.66	New
Communist Party of Denmark	158	1.07	-0.20
Total	14,715		

April 1953 Danish Folketing election

Parties	Vote		
Parties	Votes	%	+ / -
Venstre	7,260	53.07	+2.42
Social Democrats	3,066	22.41	+1.57
Justice Party of Denmark	1,191	8.71	-4.72
Social Liberals	1,047	7.65	+0.98
Conservatives	855	6.25	-0.91
Communist Party of Denmark	174	1.27	+0.01
Danish Unity	88	0.64	New
Total	13,681		

1950 Danish Folketing election

Parties	Vote		
Parties	Votes	%	+ / -
Venstre	7,210	50.65	-5.79
Social Democrats	2,967	20.84	-0.92
Justice Party of Denmark	1,912	13.43	+5.07
Conservatives	1,019	7.16	+2.59
Social Liberals	949	6.67	+0.52
Communist Party of Denmark	179	1.26	-0.69
Total	14,236		

=== General elections in the 1940s ===
1947 Danish Folketing election

Parties	Vote		
Parties	Votes	%	+ / -
Venstre	8,016	56.44	+2.35
Social Democrats	3,090	21.76	+4.20
Justice Party of Denmark	1,187	8.36	+2.45
Social Liberals	874	6.15	-2.93
Conservatives	649	4.57	-1.67
Communist Party of Denmark	277	1.95	-2.71
Danish Unity	110	0.77	-1.70
Total	14,203		

1945 Danish Folketing election

Parties	Vote		
Parties	Votes	%	+ / -
Venstre	7,519	54.09	+2.85
Social Democrats	2,441	17.56	-6.27
Social Liberals	1,262	9.08	+1.36
Conservatives	867	6.24	-1.90
Justice Party of Denmark	821	5.91	+0.49
Communist Party of Denmark	648	4.66	New
Danish Unity	343	2.47	+1.05
Total	13,901		

1943 Danish Folketing election

Parties	Vote		
Parties	Votes	%	+ / -
Venstre	7,200	51.24	+4.64
Social Democrats	3,349	23.83	+2.66
Conservatives	1,144	8.14	+0.58
Social Liberals	1,085	7.72	-1.12
Justice Party of Denmark	762	5.42	-4.96
Danish Unity	199	1.42	+1.00
Farmers' Party	167	1.19	-1.72
National Socialist Workers' Party of Denmark	146	1.04	+0.63
Total	14,052		

=== General elections in the 1930s ===
1939 Danish Folketing election

Parties	Vote		
Parties	Votes	%	+ / -
Venstre	5,137	46.60	+3.37
Social Democrats	2,334	21.17	-0.82
Justice Party of Denmark	1,144	10.38	+4.17
Social Liberals	975	8.84	-0.16
Conservatives	833	7.56	-1.79
Farmers' Party	321	2.91	-5.78
Communist Party of Denmark	153	1.39	+0.38
Danish Unity	46	0.42	New
National Socialist Workers' Party of Denmark	45	0.41	-0.12
National Cooperation	36	0.33	New
Total	11,024		

1935 Danish Folketing election

Parties	Vote		
Parties	Votes	%	+ / -
Venstre	4,837	43.23	-11.05
Social Democrats	2,460	21.99	+1.52
Conservatives	1,046	9.35	+1.46
Social Liberals	1,007	9.00	-1.49
Independent People's Party	972	8.69	New
Justice Party of Denmark	695	6.21	-0.25
Communist Party of Denmark	113	1.01	+0.60
National Socialist Workers' Party of Denmark	59	0.53	New
Total	11,189		

1932 Danish Folketing election

Parties	Vote		
Parties	Votes	%	+ / -
Venstre	6,024	54.28	-8.07
Social Democrats	2,272	20.47	+2.77
Social Liberals	1,164	10.49	-0.94
Conservatives	875	7.89	+2.17
Justice Party of Denmark	717	6.46	+3.79
Communist Party of Denmark	45	0.41	+0.27
Total	11,097		

=== General elections in the 1920s ===
1929 Danish Folketing election

Parties	Vote		
Parties	Votes	%	+ / -
Venstre	6,663	62.35	-2.72
Social Democrats	1,891	17.70	+2.38
Social Liberals	1,221	11.43	+0.72
Conservatives	611	5.72	-1.07
Justice Party of Denmark	285	2.67	+0.61
Communist Party of Denmark	15	0.14	+0.09
Total	10,686		

1926 Danish Folketing election

Parties	Vote		
Parties	Votes	%	+ / -
Venstre	6,452	65.07	+1.57
Social Democrats	1,519	15.32	-0.12
Social Liberals	1,062	10.71	-2.85
Conservatives	673	6.79	+1.81
Justice Party of Denmark	204	2.06	-0.06
Communist Party of Denmark	5	0.05	+0.01
Total	9,915		

1924 Danish Folketing election

Parties	Vote		
Parties	Votes	%	+ / -
Venstre	5,881	63.50	-10.01
Social Democrats	1,430	15.44	+6.18
Social Liberals	1,256	13.56	-1.12
Conservatives	461	4.98	+2.79
Justice Party of Denmark	196	2.12	New
Farmer Party	34	0.37	New
Communist Party of Denmark	4	0.04	New
Total	9,262		

September 1920 Danish Folketing election

Parties	Vote		
Parties	Votes	%	+ / -
Venstre	6,695	73.51	-0.83
Social Liberals	1,337	14.68	+0.11
Social Democrats	843	9.26	+1.43
Conservatives	199	2.19	-0.61
Industry Party	33	0.36	-0.09
Total	9,107		

July 1920 Danish Folketing election

Parties	Vote		
Parties	Votes	%	+ / -
Venstre	5,734	74.34	-0.66
Social Liberals	1,124	14.57	-0.49
Social Democrats	604	7.83	+0.45
Conservatives	216	2.80	+0.61
Industry Party	35	0.45	+0.24
Total	7,713		

April 1920 Danish Folketing election

Parties	Vote	
Parties	Votes	%
Venstre	6,084	75.75
Social Liberals	1,222	15.06
Social Democrats	599	7.38
Conservatives	178	2.19
Industry Party	17	0.21
Free Social Democrats	12	0.15
Total	8,112	

== European Parliament elections results ==
2024 European Parliament election in Denmark

Parties	Vote		
Parties	Votes	%	+ / -
Venstre	5,709	28.74	-7.57
Denmark Democrats	2,898	14.59	New
Social Democrats	2,839	14.29	-4.60
Green Left	1,722	8.67	+1.67
Conservatives	1,712	8.62	+3.88
Danish People's Party	1,546	7.78	-8.60
Liberal Alliance	1,340	6.75	+3.20
Moderates	914	4.60	New
Social Liberals	580	2.92	-2.90
Red–Green Alliance	359	1.81	-0.69
The Alternative	242	1.22	-0.40
Total	19,861		

2019 European Parliament election in Denmark

Parties	Vote		
Parties	Votes	%	+ / -
Venstre	8,358	36.31	+6.25
Social Democrats	4,347	18.89	+5.33
Danish People's Party	3,771	16.38	-15.89
Green Left	1,612	7.00	+1.24
Social Liberals	1,339	5.82	+2.36
Conservatives	1,092	4.74	-3.59
Liberal Alliance	817	3.55	+1.42
People's Movement against the EU	734	3.19	-1.24
Red–Green Alliance	575	2.50	New
The Alternative	373	1.62	New
Total	23,018		

2014 European Parliament election in Denmark

Parties	Vote		
Parties	Votes	%	+ / -
Danish People's Party	6,414	32.27	+16.42
Venstre	5,975	30.06	-6.52
Social Democrats	2,696	13.56	-2.27
Conservatives	1,656	8.33	-5.36
Green Left	1,145	5.76	-3.40
People's Movement against the EU	881	4.43	+0.44
Social Liberals	688	3.46	+0.70
Liberal Alliance	424	2.13	+1.70
Total	19,879		

2009 European Parliament election in Denmark

Parties	Vote		
Parties	Votes	%	+ / -
Venstre	7,486	36.58	+2.59
Danish People's Party	3,245	15.85	+9.89
Social Democrats	3,239	15.83	-17.04
Conservatives	2,801	13.69	+5.31
Green Left	1,874	9.16	+5.89
People's Movement against the EU	816	3.99	+1.32
Social Liberals	565	2.76	-0.56
June Movement	354	1.73	-5.71
Liberal Alliance	87	0.43	New
Total	20,467		

2004 European Parliament election in Denmark

Parties	Vote		
Parties	Votes	%	+ / -
Venstre	4,881	33.99	-5.12
Social Democrats	4,720	32.87	+21.40
Conservatives	1,203	8.38	+0.15
June Movement	1,069	7.44	-5.38
Danish People's Party	856	5.96	+0.34
Social Liberals	477	3.32	-4.31
Green Left	470	3.27	-0.47
People's Movement against the EU	384	2.67	-2.01
Christian Democrats	301	2.10	-1.48
Total	14,361		

1999 European Parliament election in Denmark

Parties	Vote		
Parties	Votes	%	+ / -
Venstre	5,755	39.11	+1.32
June Movement	1,886	12.82	+3.29
Social Democrats	1,688	11.47	+0.43
Conservatives	1,211	8.23	-7.82
Social Liberals	1,123	7.63	+0.86
Danish People's Party	827	5.62	New
People's Movement against the EU	689	4.68	-2.32
Green Left	551	3.74	-1.25
Christian Democrats	527	3.58	+1.11
Centre Democrats	459	3.12	+2.42
Progress Party	206	1.40	-2.26
Total	14,716		

1994 European Parliament election in Denmark

Parties	Vote		
Parties	Votes	%	+ / -
Venstre	5,868	37.79	-0.75
Conservatives	2,492	16.05	+5.15
Social Democrats	1,714	11.04	-4.77
June Movement	1,480	9.53	New
People's Movement against the EU	1,087	7.00	-0.77
Social Liberals	1,051	6.77	+3.58
Green Left	775	4.99	+1.05
Progress Party	568	3.66	-2.68
Christian Democrats	384	2.47	-2.84
Centre Democrats	108	0.70	-7.50
Total	15,527		

1989 European Parliament election in Denmark

Parties	Vote		
Parties	Votes	%	+ / -
Venstre	5,007	38.54	+6.76
Social Democrats	2,054	15.81	+2.64
Conservatives	1,416	10.90	-8.92
Centre Democrats	1,065	8.20	+0.13
People's Movement against the EU	1,009	7.77	-1.28
Progress Party	824	6.34	+2.26
Christian Democrats	690	5.31	-0.61
Green Left	512	3.94	-0.29
Social Liberals	415	3.19	-0.28
Total	12,992		

1984 European Parliament election in Denmark

Parties	Vote	
Parties	Votes	%
Venstre	4,885	31.78
Conservatives	3,046	19.82
Social Democrats	2,024	13.17
People's Movement against the EU	1,391	9.05
Centre Democrats	1,240	8.07
Christian Democrats	910	5.92
Green Left	650	4.23
Progress Party	627	4.08
Social Liberals	533	3.47
Left Socialists	66	0.43
Total	15,372	

== Referendums ==
2022 Danish European Union opt-out referendum

Option	Votes	%
✓ YES	14,852	63.07
X NO	8,698	36.93

2015 Danish European Union opt-out referendum

Option	Votes	%
X NO	13,937	52.71
✓ YES	12,506	47.29

2014 Danish Unified Patent Court membership referendum

Option	Votes	%
✓ YES	12,799	66.17
X NO	6,544	33.83

2009 Danish Act of Succession referendum

Option	Votes	%
✓ YES	17,364	87.09
X NO	2,575	12.91

2000 Danish euro referendum

Option	Votes	%
✓ YES	13,860	51.32
X NO	13,145	48.68

1998 Danish Amsterdam Treaty referendum

Option	Votes	%
✓ YES	14,364	62.50
X NO	8,617	37.50

1993 Danish Maastricht Treaty referendum

Option	Votes	%
✓ YES	17,371	66.46
X NO	8,767	33.54

1992 Danish Maastricht Treaty referendum

Option	Votes	%
✓ YES	14,908	60.42
X NO	9,766	39.58

1986 Danish Single European Act referendum

Option	Votes	%
✓ YES	18,015	77.47
X NO	5,239	22.53

1972 Danish European Communities membership referendum

Option	Votes	%
✓ YES	16,644	76.53
X NO	5,103	23.47

1953 Danish constitutional and electoral age referendum

Option	Votes	%
✓ YES	8,818	85.48
X NO	1,498	14.52
23 years	7,641	72.01
21 years	2,970	27.99

1939 Danish constitutional referendum

Option	Votes	%
✓ YES	2,760	77.90
X NO	783	22.10
