= Rasmus Nordqvist =

Danish politician

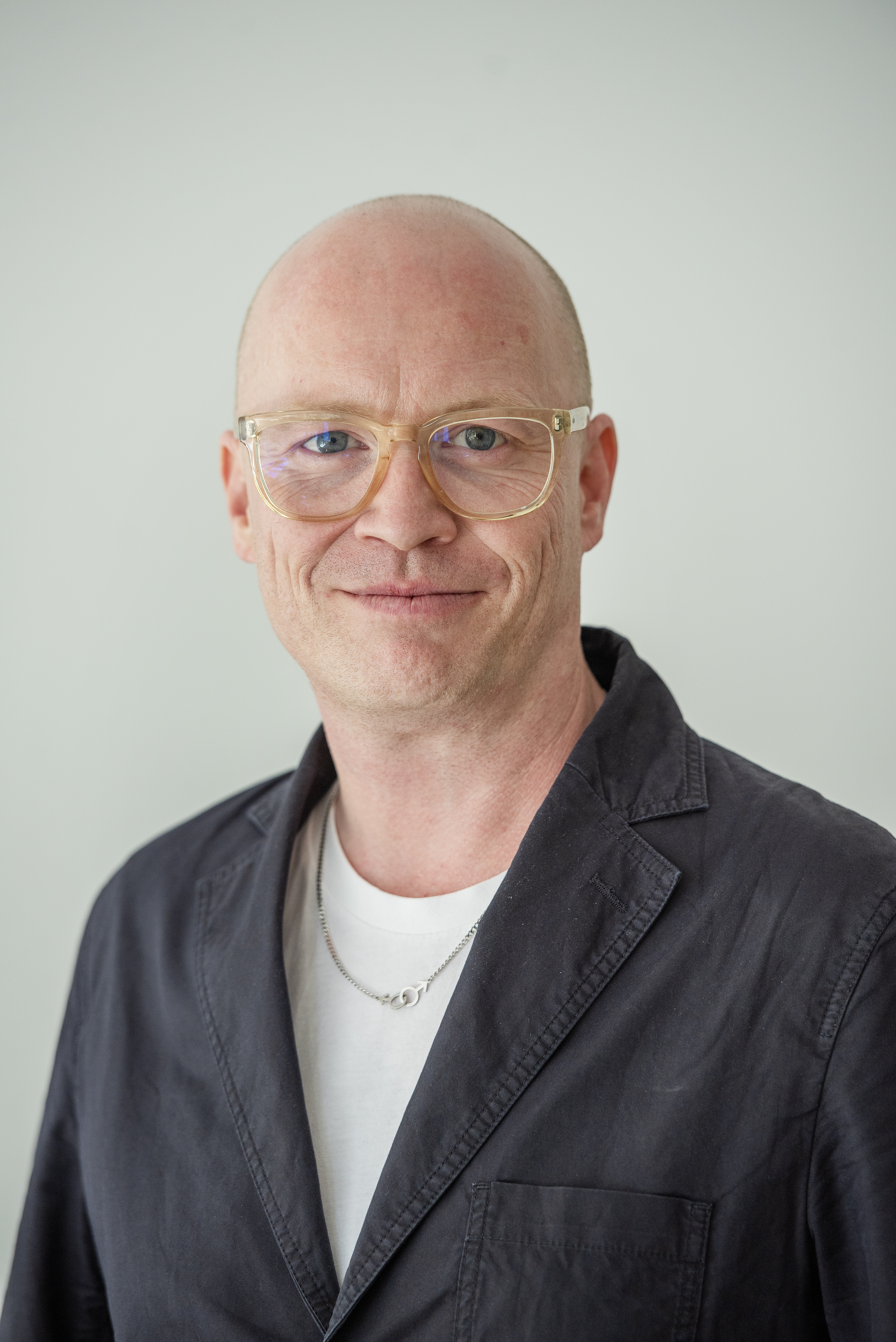

Member of the European Parliament for Denmark
- Incumbent
- Assumed office 16 July 2024

Member of the Folketing
- In office 18 June 2015 – 1 November 2022
- Constituency: Zealand

Personal details
- Born: 18 July 1975 (age 51) Copenhagen, Denmark
- Party: Socialist People's Party (2020–present)
- Other political affiliations: The Alternative (2013–2020)

Rasmus Nordqvist (born 18 July 1975) is a Danish politician, who is a member of the Folketing for the Socialist People's Party. He was elected into parliament in the 2015 Danish general election as a member of The Alternative, but changed party to the SPP in 2020.

== Political career ==
Nordqvist was elected into parliament as a member of The Alternative in the 2015 election. He was reelected in 2019, but left the party shortly after - along with Uffe Elbæk, Sikandar Siddique and Susanne Zimmer. The three other former Alternative members went on to found a new party, the Independent Greens, while Nordqvist instead remained independent for two months before joining the Socialist People's Party.

Nordqvist is a member of the LGBTQ community. He is married to Nicolai Østenlund.
