= Theresa Scavenius =

Danish politician (born 1984)

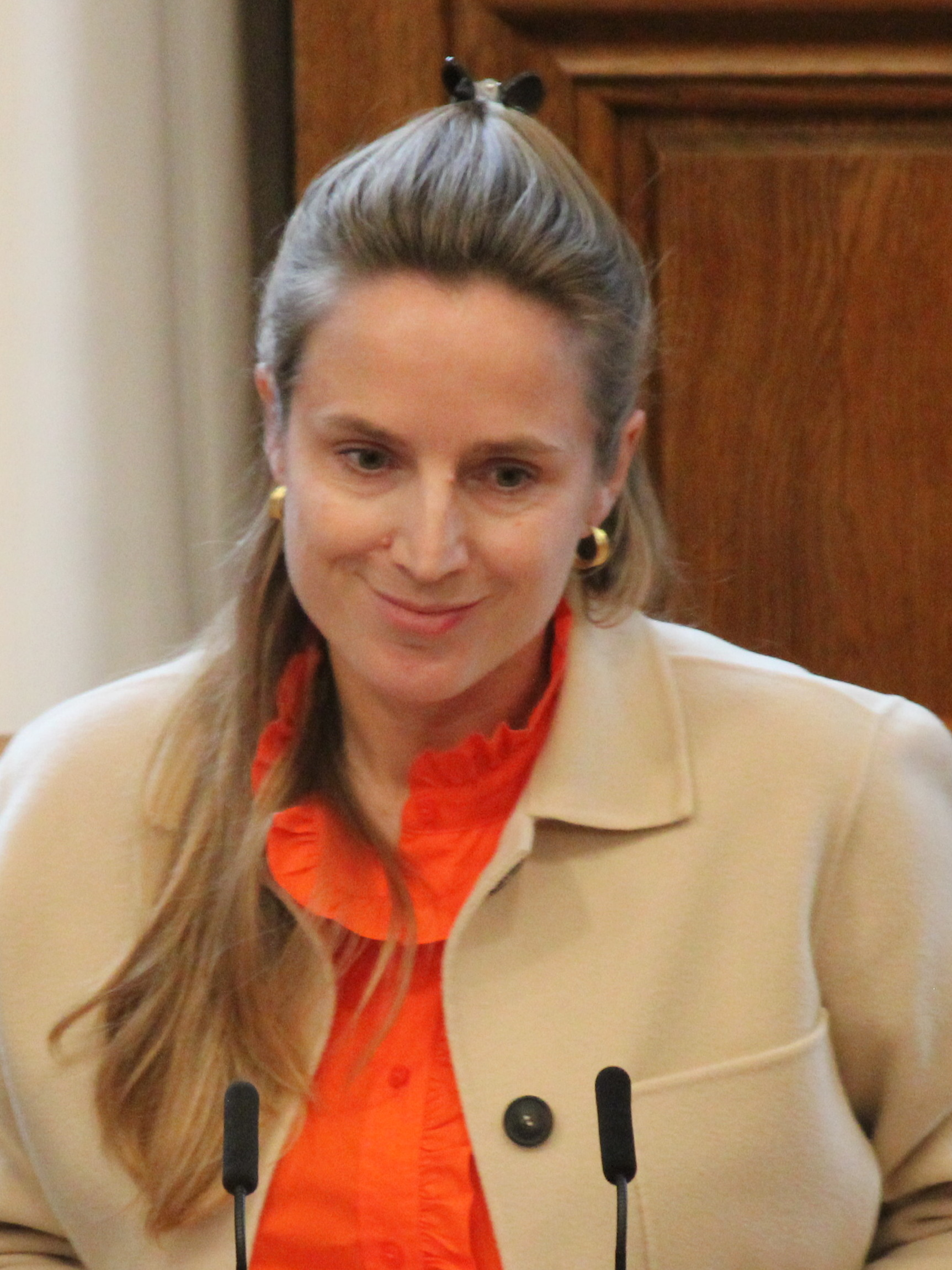
- Scavenius in 2025
- Born: 26 July 1984 (age 42)
- Education: University of Copenhagen
- Occupations: Climate scientist and politician
- Employer: Aalborg University
- Political party: Independent
- Other political affiliations: Danish Social Liberal Party (2016–2017); The Alternative (2017–2020, 2022–2023); Momentum (2021–2022)
- Relatives: Erik Scavenius (great-granduncle)
- Website: theresascavenius.dk

Theresa Birgitta Brønnum Scavenius (born 26 July 1984) is a Danish politician who currently serves as an independent member of the Folketing. Previously a member of the green political party The Alternative, she was first elected at the 2022 Danish general election as a member of the party, having previously run unsuccessfully for them in the 2019 election. She was a candidate to succeed Uffe Elbæk as leader of the party, after he resigned in February 2020, but lost to Josephine Fock.

In September 2023, after being stripped of her committee assignments and excluded from The Alternative's parliamentary group, Scavenius resigned as a member of the party. She continues to sit in the Folketing as an independent politician.

She is an associate professor at Aalborg University Copenhagen with climate politics as her research area.

== Background ==
Theresa Scavenius is the great grandchild of Fergus Roger Scavenius, who was a younger brother of Erik Scavenius, former prime minister of Denmark.

Scavenius was a student at Christianshavn Gymnasium. In 2005 she started to study German at the University of Copenhagen, and wrote her bachelor's thesis about Thomas Mann in 2007. She studied political science, also at the University of Copenhagen, and graduated in 2011. In 2014, she completed a Ph.D, with her dissertation named Moral Responsibility for Climate Change: A Fact-Sensitive Political Theory.

== Academic career ==
Theresa Scavenius has been an associate professor at Aalborg University since 2017, and have climate politics as her research area. She is working in the Department of Planning at the university's Copenhagen campus. In December 2017, she was named one of 10 "junior research talents" and awarded a three-year research grant of 3 million DKK in total. Her research project is titled Institutional mediation, emergent technologies and green transition paths.

In 2017 she co-edited the book Compromise and Disagreement in Contemporary Political Theory alongside Christian Rostbøll, and in 2018 the book Institutional Capacity for Climate Response: A New Approach to Climate politics alongside Steve Rayner. In 2019 she authored the book Political Responsibility for Climate Change: Ethical Institutions and Fact-Sensitive Theory.

Scavenius was one of 301 Danish researchers who in May 2018 published an open letter, calling politicians to prioritise a more ambitious climate policy above economic growth. She has appeared in Danish media as a climate expert and has been active in the public debate on climate change.

== Political career ==
Theresa Scavenius was a member of the Danish Social Liberal Party from 2016 to 2017. In September 2017, she was a candidate to become vice chairman of the party, but lost to Bitten Schjødts Kjær. She subsequently left the party.

Scavenius joined The Alternative in December 2017, and was a candidate in the 2019 general election, running in the North Zealand constituency. She said she decided to run because she was "deeply frustrated" by Danish climate politics, which she perceived to be unambitious. She received donations of 300,000 DKK for her campaign. The donations were controversial because The Alternative has a political goal to remove money from politics. Scavenius did not get elected, as The Alternative did not win any seats in the constituency. She received 1,267 votes; the most among the party's candidates in the constituency. Incumbent member of the Folketing, Christian Poll, followed with 1,162 votes.

In December 2019, she announced that she was a candidate to become political leader of The Alternative, after founder Uffe Elbæk announced that he would resign in February 2020. Before her announcement, she had been seen as a likely candidate by the media. After two elimination rounds, she lost to Josephine Fock who got 936 votes against Scavenius's 668 votes. The election of Fock caused a leadership crisis in which four of the party' five members of the Folketing, including Elbæk, left The Alternative. Scavenius subsequently left the party, referencing its "de facto dissolution".

In March 2021, Scavenius announced she was starting a new climate-based political party entitled "Momentum", but after receiving just under 3,000 votes in the Copenhagen municipal elections, the party folded. Scavenius later returned to The Alternative and was elected to the Folketing in the 2022 Danish general election.

In September 2023, Scavenius was stripped of her committee assignments and excluded from The Alternative's parliamentary group. Following this, she resigned as a member of the party.
