= Josephine Fock =

Danish politician (born 1965)

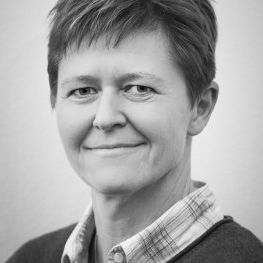

Member of the Folketing
- In office 18 June 2015 – 31 October 2018
- Constituency: East Jutland

Leader of the Alternative
- In office 1 February 2020 – 14 November 2020
- Preceded by: Uffe Elbæk
- Succeeded by: Torsten Gejl (a.i.)

Personal details
- Born: 5 September 1965 (age 60) Aarhus, Denmark
- Party: The Alternative

Josephine Fock (born 5 September 1965) is a former Danish politician who was a member of the Folketing for The Alternative from 2015 to 2018. She served as the party leader from 1 February to 14 November 2020 after Uffe Elbæk resigned.

== Political career ==
Born in Aarhus, Fock was elected into parliament at the 2015 Danish general election. In 2018 she was offered a job for the Danish Refugee Council, and she resigned her seat in parliament on 1 November 2018. Julius Graakjær Grantzau took over her seat.

On 16 December 2019, the leader of the Alternative, Uffe Elbæk, announced that he would like to pass on the leadership. On 1 February 2020 Fock became the party's new leader. A month later, on 9 March, Uffe Elbæk, Susanne Zimmer, Sikandar Siddique, and Rasmus Nordqvist left the party, with Elbæk stating that he "could no longer recognize the party that he founded" under Fock's leadership. This left the party with only one member in parliament: Torsten Gejl. On 14 November 2020,Fock resigned as the party's leader, leaving Gejl as the ad interim leader until 7 February 2021 when Franciska Rosenkilde became the new official leader.

Political offices
Preceded by Uffe Elbæk	Leader of The Alternative; 2020	Succeeded by Torsten Gejl (a.i.)
