= Rostbøll =

Rostbøll is a surname. Notable people with the surname include:

- Christian F. Rostbøll (born 1971), Danish philosopher
- Grethe Rostbøll (1941–2021), Danish politician
