= Torsten Gejl =

Danish politician (born 1964)

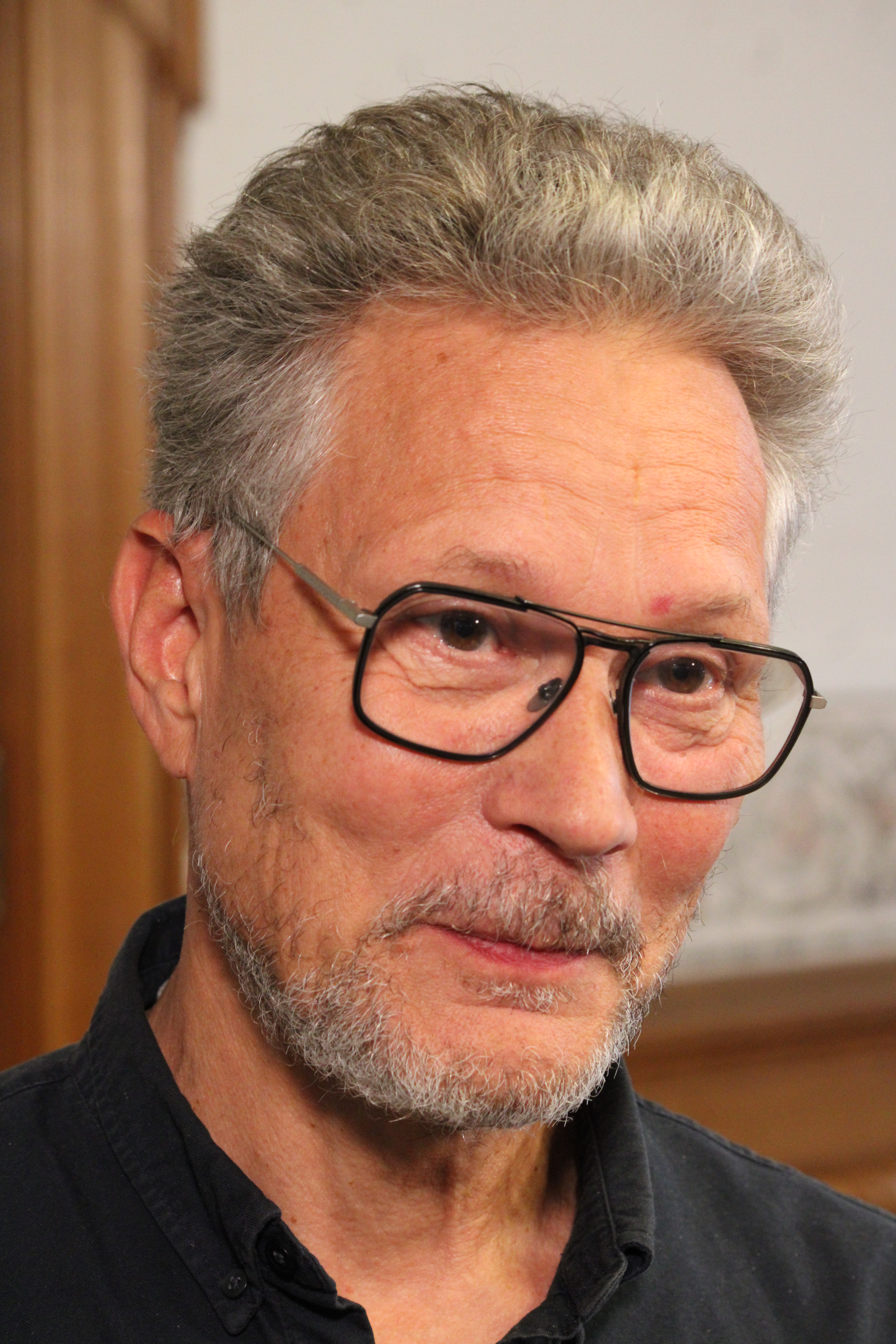
- Gejl in 2025

Member of the Folketing
- Incumbent
- Assumed office 18 June 2015
- Constituency: East Jutland (from 2019); North Jutland (2015-2019)

Personal details
- Born: 30 January 1964 (age 62) Aarhus, Denmark
- Party: The Alternative

Torsten Gejl (born 30 January 1964) is a Danish politician who is a member of the Folketing for The Alternative political party. He was elected into parliament at the 2015 Danish general election. He is currently the group leader of The Alternative in the Folketing.

== Political career ==
Gejl was first elected into parliament in the 2015 election, where he received 1,433 votes. He was elected again in the 2019 election, receiving 1,383 votes. When four of the party's five Folketing members left the party on 9 March 2020 Torsten Gejl was the only member of the party remaining. When Josephine Fock stepped down as leader of the party on 14 November 2020, Torsten Gejl was the ad interim leader of the party while the seat was vacant.

On 3 March 2026, Gejl represented The Alternative at a televised debate for the 2026 Danish general election.

Political offices
Preceded by Josephine Fock	Leader of The Alternative; 2020-2021 (a.i.)	Succeeded by Franciska Rosenkilde
