= Katarina Ammitzbøll =

Danish politician

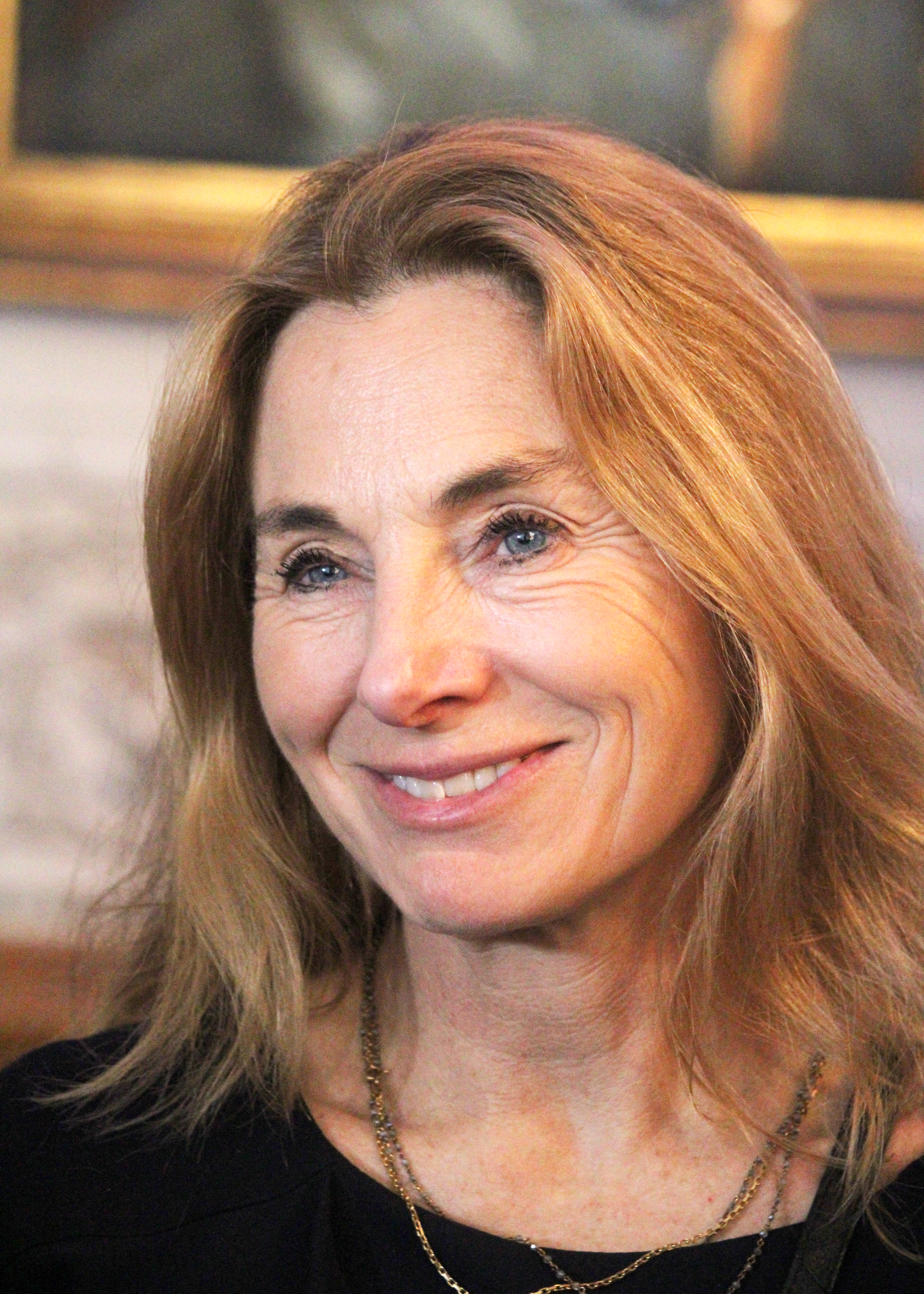
- Ammitzbøl in 2026

Member of the Folketing
- Incumbent
- Assumed office 5 June 2019
- Constituency: Copenhagen

Personal details
- Born: 15 July 1969 (age 57) Charlottenlund, Denmark
- Party: Conservative People's Party

Katarina Ammitzbøll (born 15 July 1969 in Charlottenlund) is a Danish politician, who is a member of the Folketing for the Conservative People's Party. She was elected into parliament at the 2019 Danish general election.

== Political career ==
Ammitzbøll first ran for parliament in the 2015 Danish general election, where she received 1,149 votes. This resulted in her becoming a substitute member of the Folketing in the 2015-2019 term, though she was not called upon during the term. She was elected into the municipal council of Gentofte Municipality at the 2017 local election. She ran for parliament again in the 2019 election where she received 2,261, securing her a seat in the Folketing.

== Aiding the exile of Ted Hui ==
In late November 2021, Ammitzbøll and Uffe Elbæk aided former Hong Kong lawmaker Ted Hui, who was under criminal investigation, to obtain a visa to leave Hong Kong. Hui used this opportunity to self-exile, as he announced shortly after arriving. Danish reports said that Hong Kong authorities would seek to have Ammitzbøll and Elbæk extradited.
