= Kaospilot =

Danish disruptive education provider

Coordinates: 56.151098°N 10.213370°E

- KaosPiloterne
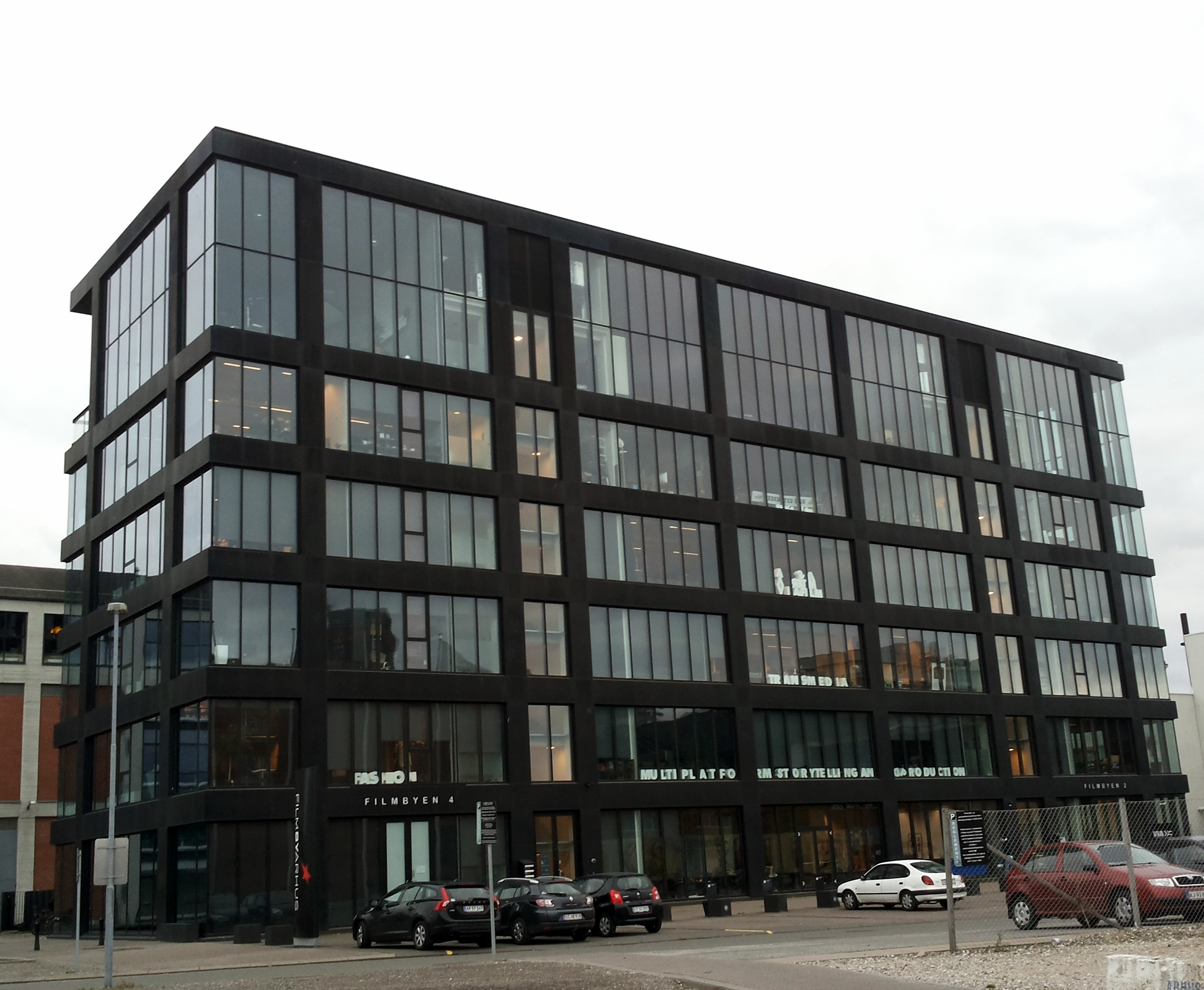
- Type: Self-governing educational institution
- Established: 1991
- Founder: Uffe Elbæk
- Chair: Jan de Man Lapidoth
- Principal: Federico Bortoletto
- Director: Federico Bortoletto
- Administrative staff: 16
- Students: c. 120
- Location: Nørreport 20, Aarhus, Denmark
- Language: English
- Website: kaospilot.dk

Kaospilot (lit. 'Chaos Pilot') is a disruptive education provider and facilitator of learning experiences for individuals, communities and organizations located in Aarhus, Denmark, and surrounded by the creative and vibrant areas of Filmbyen and Sydhavn, at the edge of the city harbor.

== Details ==
Founded by Uffe Elbæk in 1991, Kaospilot is today funded by the European Union and student fees.

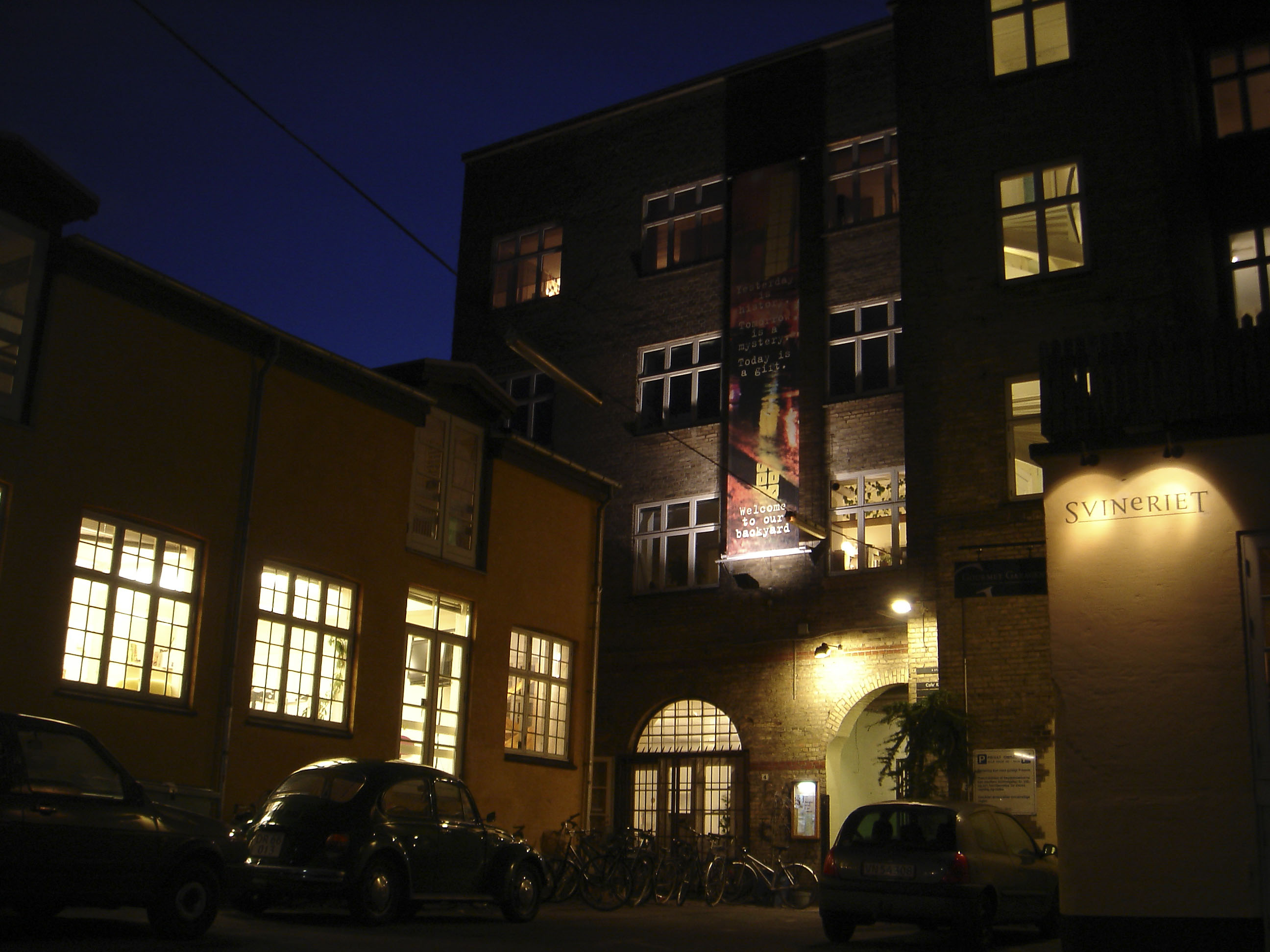
The Kaospilot Building in Mejlgade - 2006

The education accepts around 35-37 students each year with a minimum age of 21, through a rigorous selections process. Kaospilot programs teach in the fields of leadership, business design, process design and project design. The educational philosophy focuses on personal development, value-based entrepreneurship, creativity and social innovation. The Kaospilot program has been named as one of the world's 10 best schools for innovation and entrepreneurship by Fast Company, and by Business Week as one of the top design schools in the world. Kaospilot has inspired schools in Australia, Norway, Sweden, and the Netherlands.

The education was in Danish until August 2005 as the students were mainly from the Scandinavian countries. Now the official language at Kaospilot is in English, the most commonly spoken secondary language in the region.

In the summer of 2013 the Kaospilot school moved from their old address in Mejlgade to the neighborhood of Filmbyen.

== Lecturers of note ==
Kaospilot invites external lecturers to deliver the content of the semesters, and throughout the years hundreds of lecturers have engaged with the students.
