= Uffe Elbæk =

Danish politician (born 1954)

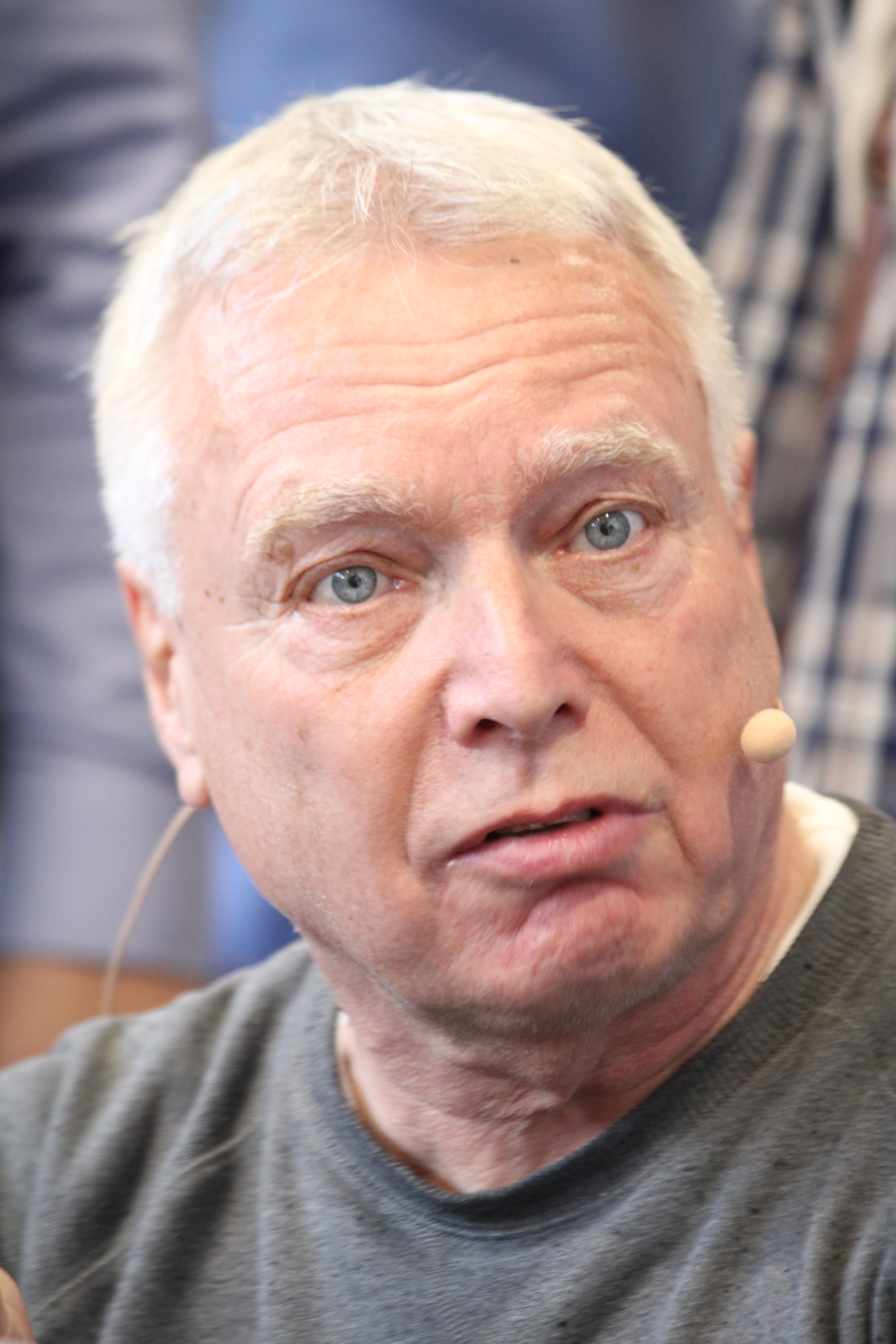
- Elbæk in 2025

Member of the Folketing
- Incumbent
- Assumed office 15 September 2011
- Constituency: Copenhagen

Political leader of the Alternative
- In office 27 November 2013 – 1 February 2020
- Succeeded by: Josephine Fock

Minister of Culture
- In office 3 October 2011 – 6 December 2012
- Prime Minister: Helle Thorning-Schmidt
- Preceded by: Per Stig Møller
- Succeeded by: Marianne Jelved

Personal details
- Born: 15 June 1954 (age 72) Ry, Denmark
- Party: The Alternative (2013–2020, 2022–present)
- Other political affiliations: Social Liberal Party (2011–2013); Independent (2020); Independent Greens (2020–2022)
- Domestic partner: Jens Pedersen

Uffe Elbæk (born 15 June 1954) is a Danish politician, social worker, author, journalist, and entrepreneur. In 2013, he founded the green political party The Alternative, which he led until February 2020.

From 3 October 2011 to December 2012, he served as the Danish Minister of Culture. He was originally a member of the Danish Social Liberal Party, but left in September 2013 to launch The Alternative with Josephine Fock. Elbæk announced on 16 December 2019 that he would stand down as political leader of The Alternative on 1 February 2020. After leaving The Alternative's leadership, Elbæk subsequently left the party completely before joining with two other Alternative parliamentarians to form the new Independent Greens in September 2020. He was succeeded by Josephine Fock. In 2022 Elbæk returned to the Alternative but did not run in the national election of November 2022. Elbæk is the author of several books, most recently the autobiography "Et liv" (2022), the story of the Kaospilots, "Mirakler i Mejlgade (2024), and the debate book "Tvivl, Håb & Handling" (2023, to be published in English as "Doubt Hope Action" in 2026).

== Early career ==
Born in Ry, Denmark, Elbæk is the founder and former Principal of the KaosPilots International School of New Business Design and Social Innovation, located in Aarhus. The KaosPilots school inspired the creation of several international schools located in Norway, Sweden and the Netherlands. He was also one of the initiators for the cultural entrepreneur-milieu called Frontløberne.

From 2007 to 2009, Elbæk served as the CEO of the 2009 World Outgames, an international LGBT event hosted in Copenhagen.

In July 2010, Elbæk founded the consulting company Change The Game with focus on leadership training skills, political campaigning, and social innovation concepts.

== Political career ==
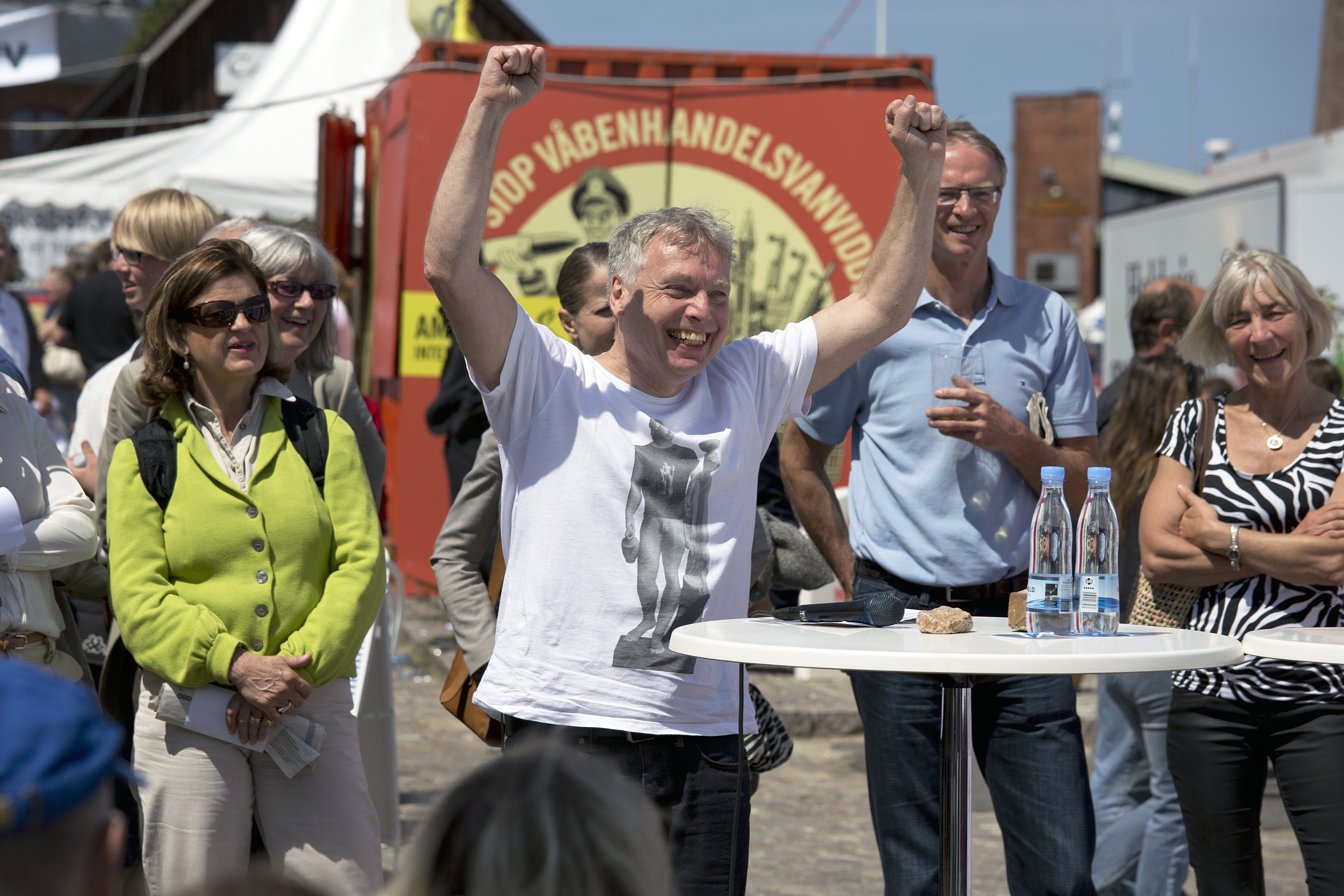
Uffe Elbaek in a public meeting in 2012

Elbæk won a seat in the Folketing for the Danish Social Liberal Party in the 2011 Danish parliamentary election. On 3 October 2011, he was appointed Culture Minister of Denmark in the government cabinet of Helle Thorning-Schmidt. He resigned from his minister position in December 2012 after criticism for holding five official gatherings at the organization AFUK - Akademiet For Utæmmet Kreativitet, where he previously held a chairman post, and where his husband was employed. He was later acquitted of all charges by the national audit agency of Denmark which concluded he hadn't had a conflict of interest. The Ministry was instead criticized for some other facets related to the case.

=== The Alternative (2013–2020) ===
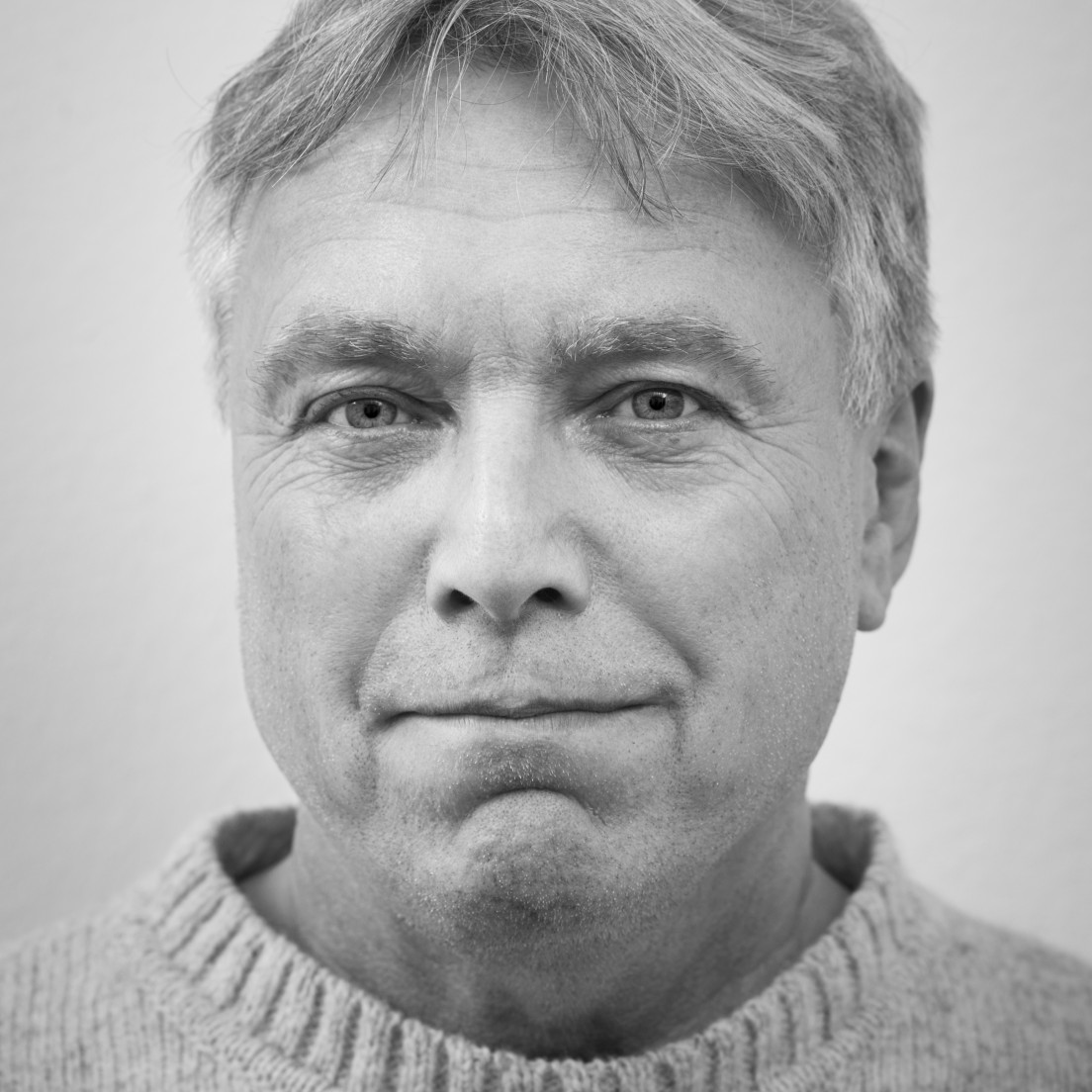
Uffe Elbæk election poster in the 2015 Danish general election

On 27 November 2013, Elbæk hosted a press conference where he announced the formation of a new "green" political party named The Alternative. The party did not have a traditional political program, but wanted to develop it together with the citizens through so called "political laboratories".

In the spring of 2014, 20 political laboratories were conducted all over Denmark, with more than 700 participants. Shortly after, on 24 May, the first crowdsourced political program became a reality. [Link to the first edition. Newest edition is here:] . The political program is updated regularly as the specific policies are developed through the political laboratories, and then verified and endorsed by the unit of political decision-makers in the Alternative, Politisk Forum (The Politic Forum).

On 23 February, Elbæk made use of Twitter to break the news that The Alternative had gathered enough signatures to become eligible to take part in the forthcoming parliamentary election. This was officially confirmed and accepted by the Interior Ministry on 23 March, when the party was granted the acceptance on the electoral lists.

At the Parliamentary election on 18 June, the Alternative obtained 4.8% of the votes (168,788), which gave them nine seats in the parliament. In a famous interview on election night, Elbæk tried to speak, but instead ended up saying "Jamenahrmendedevadvadee … man, this is crazy!" Elbæk himself received 18,796 votes, thereby attaining the 10th-most personal votes of the election. He was nominated by the party to run for Prime Minister in the election, but lost to the leader of the Social Democrats, Mette Frederiksen.

=== Independent Greens (2020–2022) ===
In March 2020, Elbæk along with Sikandar Siddique, Susanne Zimmer, and Niko Grünfeld, left The Alternative after allegations that leader Josephine Fock had verbally abused members of the party. Fock had been elected to succeed Elbæk in February. On 7 March, a slim majority in the central board gave Fock their support, with ten voting for and seven against. Following the decision, the party's local branch in Elbæk's constituency demanded that he publicly express full support of Fock, or they would withdraw their support of Elbæk. On 9 March, Elbæk left the party, saying he "no longer recognized" the party he founded.

The four formed the Independent Greens as a "responsible, climate-conscious and anti-racist party," and Siddique was elected leader.

In late November 2021, Elbæk, together with Katarina Ammitzbøll, aided former Hong Kong lawmaker Ted Hui, who was under criminal investigation, to obtain a visa to leave Hong Kong. Hui used this opportunity to self-exile, as he announced shortly after arriving. Danish reports said that Hong Kong authorities would seek to have Ammitzbøll and Elbæk extradited.

=== Return to The Alternative (2022) ===
Ahead of the Next Danish general election, new Alternative leader Franciska Rosenkilde called for a united green list including The Alternative, the Independent Greens, and the Vegan Party, as all three green parties were polling below the electoral threshold and there was a chance of no green representation in the Folketing. Siddique, however, dismissed the plan. Elbæk later called for the Independent Greens and Alternative to merge, and eventually rejoined the old party, reducing the number of sitting FG MPs to two.

== Post-political career ==
As of 2025 Elbæk is a founder and partner in the social and democratic innovation lab Tomorrow Collective.

== Personal life ==
Elbæk is the first city counsellor in Aarhus, the first Danish Minister for Culture, and the first Danish party leader to be openly gay. He lives in a registered partnership with publisher Jens Pedersen, with whom he lives in Copenhagen. Elbæk also has a son and a stepson from previous relationships. He is a member of LGBT Danmark and Amnesty International.

== Views ==
Elbæk supports a universal basic income (UBI).

Political offices
Preceded by None	Leader of The Alternative; 2013–2020	Succeeded by Josephine Fock
Preceded by Per Stig Møller	Minister for Culture; 2011–2012	Succeeded by Marianne Jelved
