= Independent Greens (Denmark) =

Political party in Denmark

Independent Greens – Denmark's New Left-wing Party Frie Grønne – Danmarks nye venstrefløjsparti
- Abbreviation: FG; Q
- Leader: Sikandar Siddique
- Founders: Sikandar Siddique; Uffe Elbæk; Susanne Zimmer; Niko Grünfeld
- Founded: 7 September 2020; 5 years ago
- Split from: The Alternative
- Membership (2022): 296
- Ideology: Green politics Anti-Zionism
- Political position: Left-wing
- Colours: Shades of white:
- Folketing: 0 / 179 (Note: Only 175 of the 179 seats in the Danish Parliament, the Folketing, are obtainable by Danish political parties as Greenland and the Faroe Islands are assigned two seats each due to their status as territories in the Kingdom of Denmark.)
- European Parliament: 0 / 15
- Municipal councils: 1 / 2,436

Election symbol
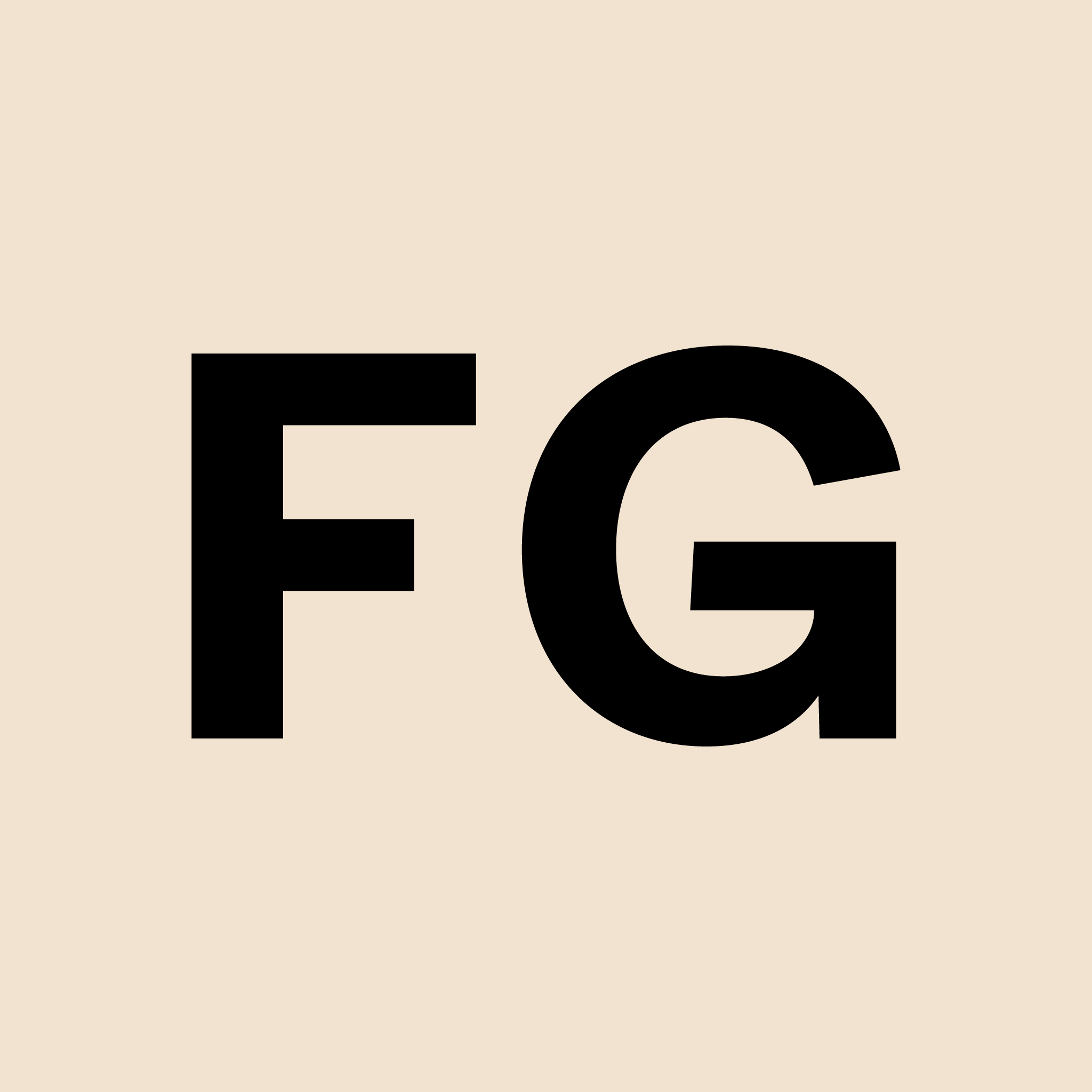
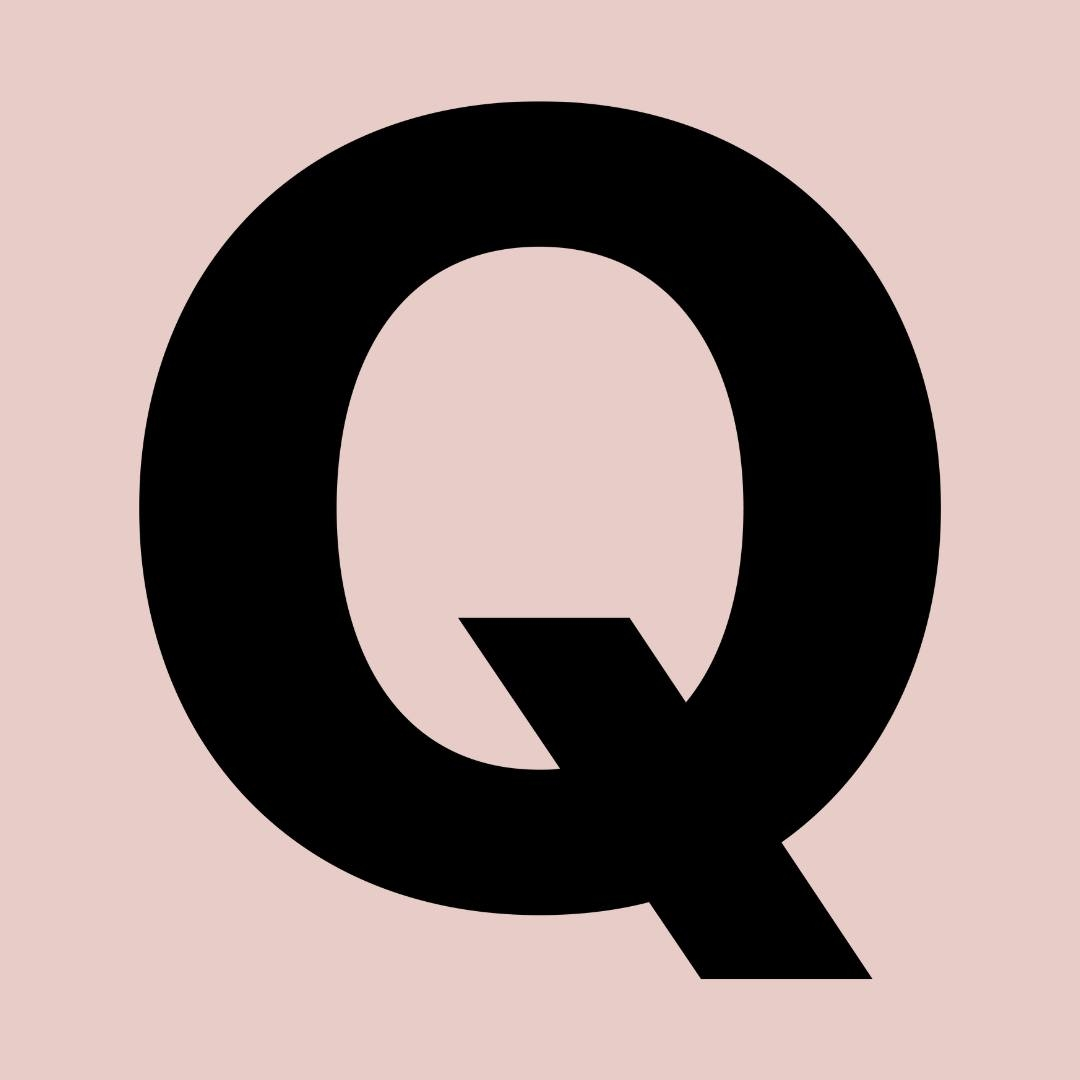

Website
- friegronne.dk

The Independent Greens – Denmark's New Left-Wing Party (Danish: Frie Grønne – Danmarks nye venstrefløjsparti), or simply the Independent Greens (Danish: Frie Grønne) (Q), is a left-wing political party in Denmark. It was founded 7 September 2020 by four former members of The Alternative: Sikandar Siddique, Uffe Elbæk, and Susanne Zimmer, who were members of the Danish parliament, and Niko Grünfeld, member of Copenhagen City Council. The party leader is Sikandar Siddique. Elbæk was founder and leader of The Alternative from 2013 to 2020.

The Independent Greens describe themselves as left wing and a "responsible, climate-conscious and anti-racist party".

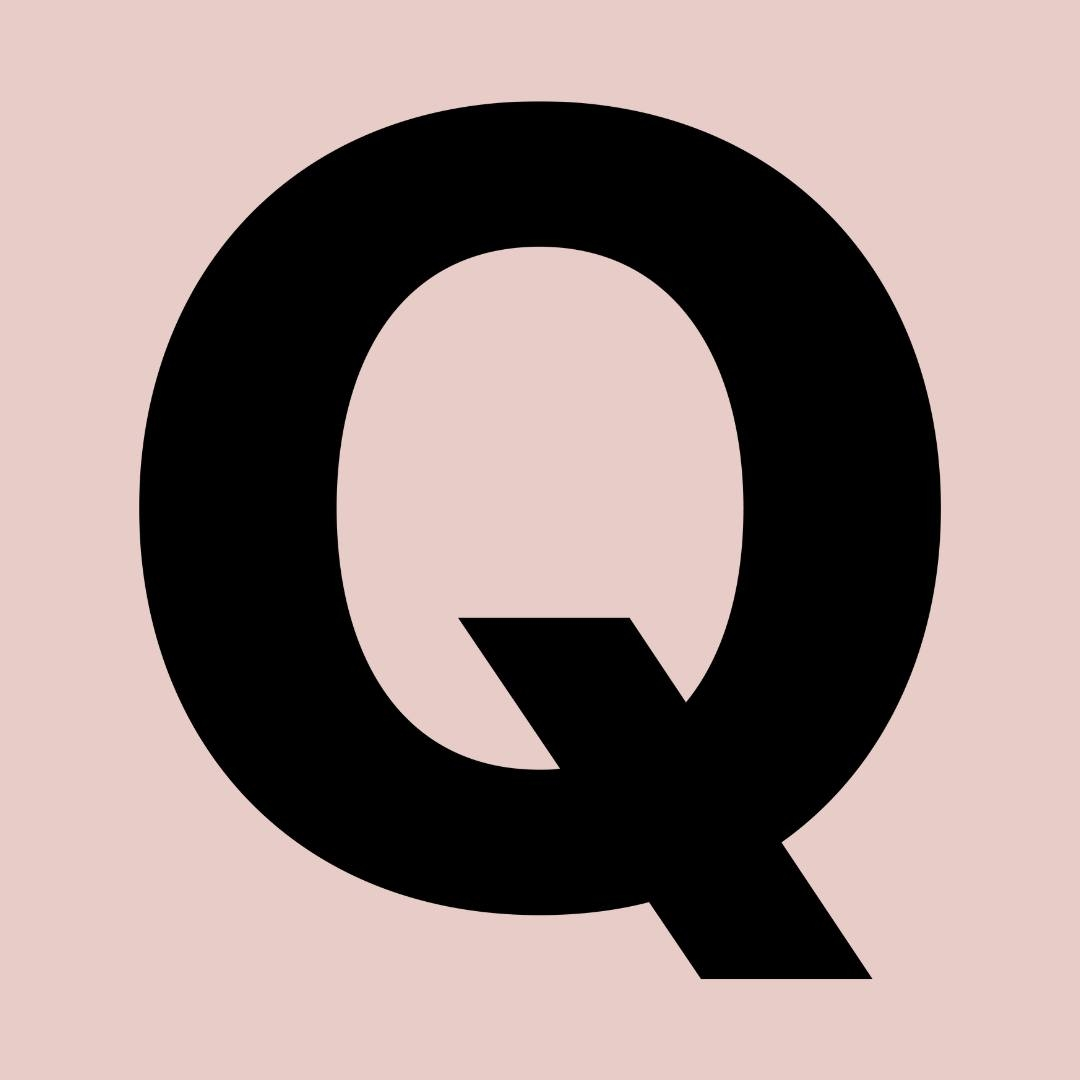
(Frie Grønne) - Free Greens - Independent Greens letter Q

== History ==
Sikandar Siddique, Uffe Elbæk, Susanne Zimmer, and Niko Grünfeld left The Alternative following allegations that new leader Josephine Fock had harassed members of the party. Three weeks after her election on 1 February, Dagbladet Information published the allegations from anonymous sources. Fock narrowly survived a motion of no confidence by The Alternative's executive board following the allegations in March 2020, after which Elbæk was handed an ultimatum by his constituency's local party branch to back Fock or have his support withdrawn. Elbæk chose to leave the party on 7 March, followed by Siddique, Zimmer and Rasmus Nordqvist; Grünfeld had already left the party on 28 February. Nordqvist subsequently joined the Socialist People's Party, while Fock would resign as leader of The Alternative on 14 November.

Ahead of the 2022 Danish general election, The Alternative's new leader Franciska Rosenkilde offered the Independent Greens and Vegan Party a chance to form a united list to increase the chances of green representation in the Folketing, as all three parties were polling below the threshold. Siddique dismissed the plan. Elbæk later called for the Independent Greens and Alternative to merge, and eventually rejoined the old party, reducing the number of sitting FG MPs to two.

In the election, the Independent Greens received 0.9% of the vote, falling below the 2% threshold to retain their seats in the Folketing. They were the second-smallest registered party in terms of vote share, ahead of only the Christian Democrats.

The party has taken a strongly pro-Palestinian and anti-Zionist stance, and advocates for a one-state solution to the Israel-Palestine conflict.

In the municipal elections on 18 November 2025, the Free Greens received 1.9 percent of the vote and thus one seat on the Copenhagen City Council. The mandate went to Sikandar Siddique, with Asham Agha Nadeem as first deputy. The party did not participate in the 2026 general election.

== Election results ==
=== Parliament ===
Election	Votes	%	Seats	+/-	Government
2022	31,787	0.9 (#13)	0 / 179	New	Extra-parliamentary

=== Municipal elections ===
Election	Votes	%	Seats	+/-
2025	7,983	0,3 %	1 / 2,432	▲1
