= Nytorv, Aalborg =

Square in Aalborg, Denmark

Coordinates: 57.047778°N 9.924444°E

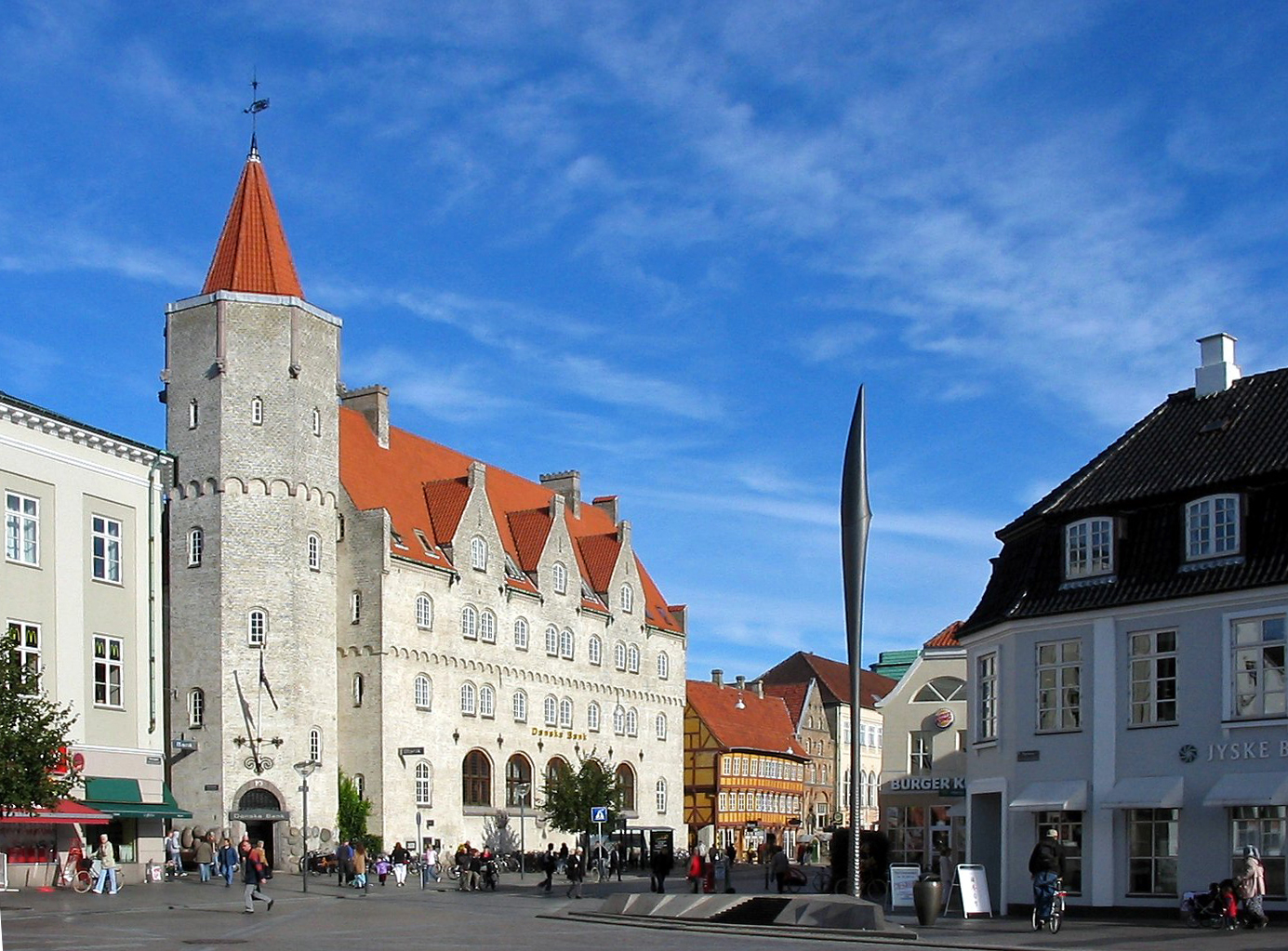
Nytorv Square

Nytorv Square is a town square in Aalborg, Denmark.

Nytorv Street was originally built as a funnel-shaped space between Østerågade and Slotsgade in 1604. The intersection of Nytorv and Østerågade is the historic center of the city and is open to pedestrians, cyclists and buses.

Nytorv is characterized by a number of shops and professional services, from west to east. These include Spar Nord, Jyske Bank, Sinnerup, Elgiganten, and Imerco, as well as the department stores Salling, and Magasin, the latter being connected to the shopping center Friis via footbridge. At the east end of the street are the Aalborg main library and community center.
