= Christian F. Rostbøll =

Danish philosopher (born 1971)

Christian Rostbøll

Education
- Education: Columbia University (Ph.D, M.Phil), LSE (M.Msc), University of Copenhagen (BA)

Philosophical work
- Era: 21st-century philosophy
- Region: Western philosophy
- Institutions: University of Copenhagen
- Main interests: Political philosophy

Christian Rostbøll (born 1971) is a Danish philosopher and Professor of Political Theory at the University of Copenhagen. He is known for his works on political philosophy.

== Books ==
- Democratic Respect: Populism, Resentment, and the Struggle for Recognition, Cambridge University Press 2023
- Compromise and Disagreement in Contemporary Political Theory, co-edited with Theresa Scavenius, Routledge 2018
- Hannah Arendt, Djøf Forlag 2010
- Deliberative Freedom: Deliberative Democracy as Critical Theory, SUNY Press 2008
- Human Rights, Popular Sovereignty and Freedom, Forlaget Politiske Studier 1998
