= The Alternative (Denmark) =

The Alternative Alternativet
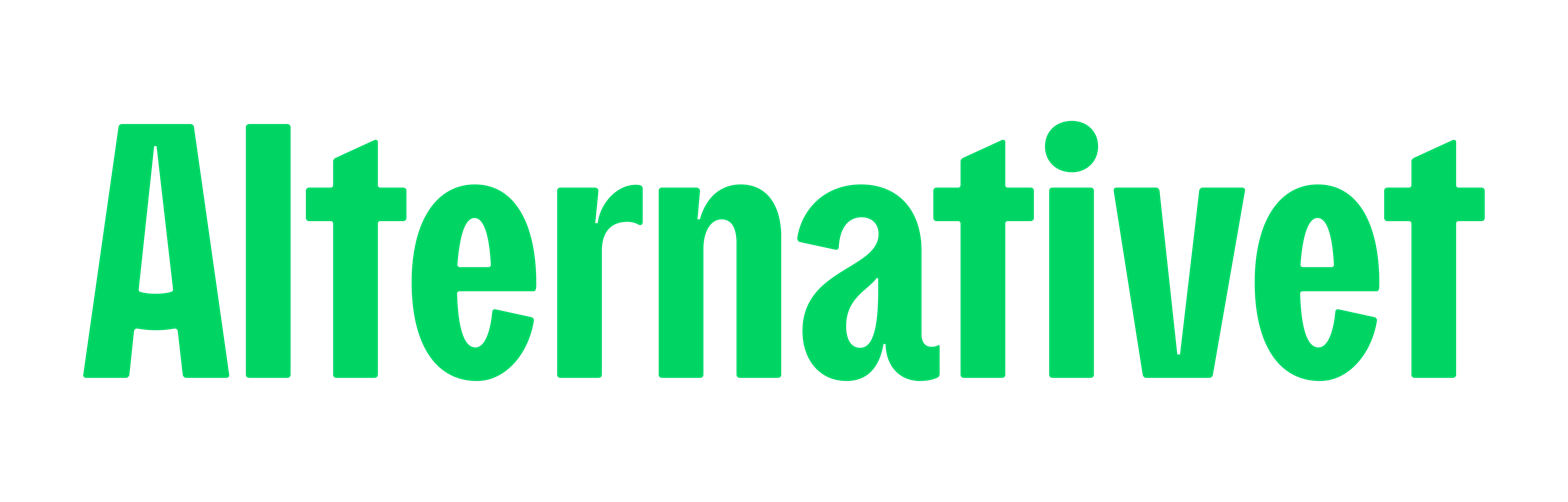
- Abbreviation: ALT; Å (Note: Official party letter on voting ballot)
- Leader: Franciska Rosenkilde
- Founders: Uffe Elbæk; Josephine Fock
- Founded: 27 November 2013
- Merger of: Vegan Party (joined)
- Split from: Social Liberal Party
- Youth wing: Alternativets Unge
- Membership (2022): ▼1,331
- Ideology: Green politics Social liberalism
- Political position: Centre-left
- Nordic affiliation: Nordic Green Left Alliance
- Colours: Bright green (official); Green (customary)
- Folketing: 5 / 179 (Note: Only 175 of the 179 seats in the Danish Parliament, the Folketing, are obtainable by Danish political parties as Greenland and the Faroe Islands are assigned two seats each due to their status as territories in the Kingdom of Denmark.)
- European Parliament: 0 / 15
- Regional councils: 0 / 205
- Municipal councils: 7 / 2,436

Election symbol

Website
- alternativet.dk; alternativet.dk/en

The Alternative (Danish: Alternativet) is a green and pro-European political party in Denmark. The party was publicly launched on 27 November 2013 by former Minister of Culture Uffe Elbæk and Josephine Fock; Elbæk had been a parliamentarian for the Social Liberal Party. Elbæk was the leader of the party until February 2020, where he stepped down and was succeeded by Fock. Currently the party is led by Franciska Rosenkilde. The Alternative regards itself as a political movement and a cultural voice, as well as a political party. The party is critical of economic growth, which it views as unsustainable.

== History ==
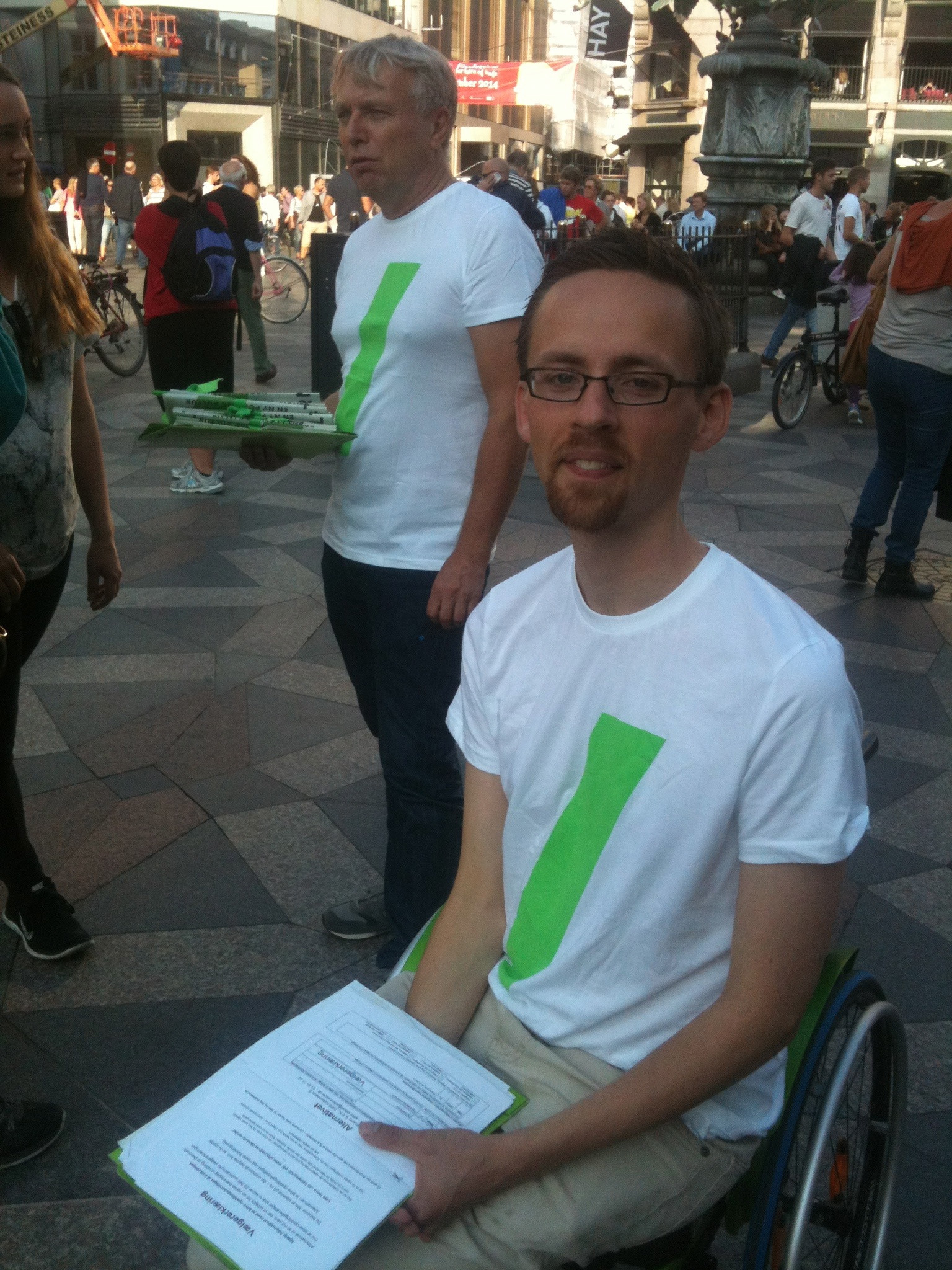
Top candidates Rune Wingård (right) and Uffe Elbæk (left) gathering signatures in Copenhagen, 19 September 2014.

=== Founding ===
The Alternative was launched on 27 November 2013 by Uffe Elbæk and Josephine Fock, at a press conference at Christiansborg, the seat of the Folketing, the Danish parliament. Other founders include Niko Grüfeld, Torsten Gejl, and Rasmus Nordqvist. The Alternative supported Helle Thorning-Schmidt, the incumbent prime minister from the Social Democrats, but considered itself both left- and right-wing. The party emphasized the wish for a new political culture, serious climate change mitigation, and entrepreneurship. It did not have a full political agenda, but would instead develop it in "political laboratories" in cooperation with the Danish people. The new party had been planned for two months; Elbæk left the Social Liberal Party on 17 September 2013.

The party's name was approved by the Danish Electoral Commission under the Ministry of Economy and the Interior, taking effect on 18 December 2013. At the beginning of 2015 the party worked on gathering the 20,260 signatures required to run for Parliament, which it succeeded in doing on 23 February 2015. The party aims to crowdsource policies through what it calls "political laboratories".

The party obtained ballot access for the 2015 general election with the party letter Å on the electoral lists on 13 March 2015.

=== 2015 election ===
In the general election on 18 June 2015, the Alternative received 4.8% of the vote, electing nine MPs and making it the sixth-largest party in the Folketing. In addition to Uffe Elbæk and Josephine Fock, the parliamentary group of the Alternative included Carolina Maier, Christian Poll, Torsten Gejl, Rasmus Nordqvist, Ulla Sandbæk, Roger Matthisen, and René Gade.

The party supported the re-election of Social Democrat leader Helle Thorning-Schmidt as Prime Minister. The party was part of the opposition to the third government of Lars Løkke Rasmussen.

=== 2019 election ===
In the 2019 general election, the Alternative decided to support their own leader, Uffe Elbæk, for prime minister rather than support the Social Democrat leader, as they had done in 2015, due to what they called insufficient ambition in plans to deal with climate change. The party won a reduced five seats and went into opposition after Social Democrat leader Mette Frederiksen became prime minister.

=== 2020 leadership crisis ===
In December 2019, Elbæk announced that he would stand down as political leader of the Alternative. There were six candidates to succeed him, including Rasmus Nordqvist, Josephine Fock and Theresa Scavenius. Only Nordqvist was member of the Folketing, and all five members of the Folketing, including Elbæk, supported him. On an extraordinary congress on 1 February 2020, Josephine Fock was elected as the new political leader. Nordqvist subsequently resigned as political spokesperson, and was replaced by Torsten Gejl.

Three weeks later, Information published an article where anonymous sources accused Fock of verbally abusing and in some cases physically shaking party members and employees while she was a member of the Folketing from 2015 to 2018, during which she was temporarily leader of the parliamentary group. Fock said she did not recognize the descriptions of her, and categorically denied the accusations of shaking people, but said she was not "the best version of herself" in that period. After a meeting with Fock, the central board said they had full confidence in her, while inviting the anonymous sources to contact the central board.

Magnus Haslebo, a former press officer in the Folketing, and Fanny Broholm, leader of the party's group on the Copenhagen city council, publicly supported the accusations of aggressive behavior, with Haslebo saying he had also heard rumors about the shaking. On 28 February, Niko Grünfeld, co-founder and former mayor in Copenhagen, left the party, saying that "the party's soul has been eaten away from within". After Elbæk said he would tell the central board what he knew, the central board said their support for Fock were only provisional, with more talks to be held. On 7 March, a slim majority in the central board gave Fock their support, with ten voting for and seven against. Following the decision, the party's local branch in Elbæk's constituency demanded that he publicly express full support of Fock, or they would withdraw their support of Elbæk.

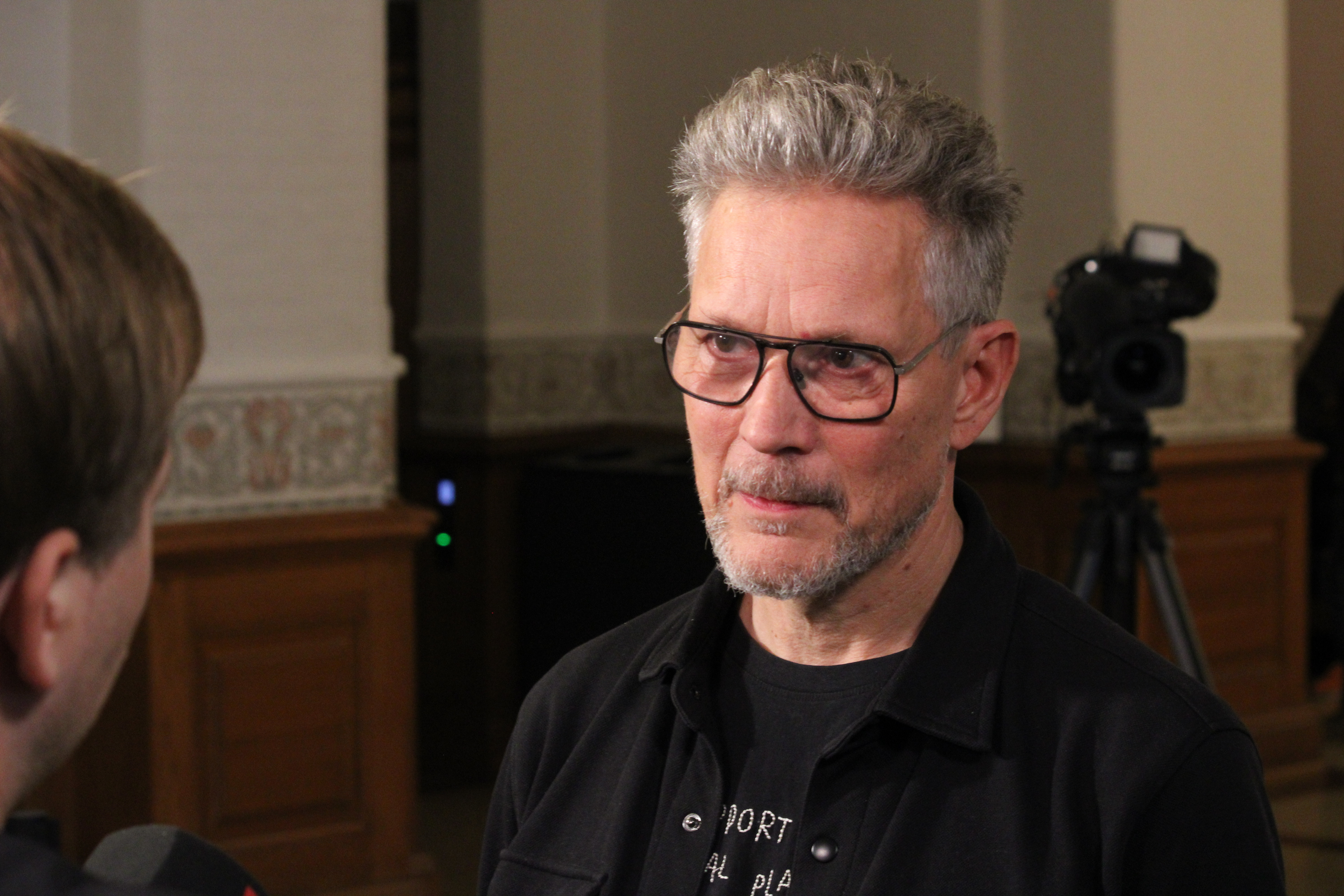
Torsten Gejl in 2025, the party's only PM following the leadership crisis

On 9 March, Uffe Elbæk left the party, saying he "no longer recognized" the party he founded. He was followed by three other member of the Folketing: Rasmus Nordqvist, Susanne Zimmer, and Sikandar Siddique. The fifth and last member of the Folketing, Torsten Gejl, decided to stay after some days of thought. Nordqvist subsequently joined the Socialist People's Party. Political analysts called the departures the death of the Alternative. In her reactions, Fock said she was saddened by the departures, but that it was a "new beginning" for the Alternative.

Elbæk, Siddique and Zimmer would later form a new political party, the Independent Greens, with Siddique as leader. On 14 November 2020, Fock stepped down as leader of the Alternative. On 7 February 2021, the party announced that Mayor of Culture and Leisure in Copenhagen Franciska Rosenkilde as their new leader.

Ahead of the 2022 Danish general election, Franciska Rosenkilde offered the Independent Greens and The Vegan Party a chance to form a united list to increase the chances of green representation in the Folketing, as all three parties were polling below the threshold. Siddique dismissed the plan. Elbæk later called for the Independent Greens and Alternative to merge, and eventually rejoined the old party, reducing the number of sitting FG MPs to two.

In the general election of 1 November 2022, the Alternative received 3.3% of the vote, up from 3.0% in 2019, securing 6 mandates in the Folketing.

== Parliamentary representation ==
=== 2015 ===
The members of Parliament from 2015 and their spokesperson assignments:

- Uffe Elbæk: Leader of the Alternative
- Josephine Fock: Political group leader of the Alternative. Spokeswoman for finance and economy, employment policy, constitution and legal policy
- Rasmus Nordqvist: Political Spokesman for the Alternative. Spokesman for Foreign Affairs, European Affairs, Entrepreneurship, Ethical Consumerism, Business, Trade, Art, and Culture
- René Gade: Spokesman for Defense, Taxes, and Digital Constitutional Rights.
- Torsten Gejl: Spokesman for Domestic Policy, Pattern Breaking and Social Affairs
- Roger Matthisen: Spokesman for Cities and Residences, Rural Districts, Islands, the Faroe Islands, and Greenland
- Ulla Sandbæk: Spokesman for Ecclesiastical Affairs, Naturalisation, Integration and Development
- Carolina Magdalene Maier: Spokesman for Health, Psychiatry, Equal Rights, Youth, Family, Senior Citizens, Education, Research, Schools, and Youth Education Programs
- Christian Poll: Spokesman for Environment, Climate, Energy, Agriculture, Animal Welfare, Fisheries, Food, and Transport

=== 2019 ===
The following members were elected to the Folketing in 2019

- Uffe Elbæk (left the party in March 2020)
- Torsten Gejl
- Rasmus Nordqvist (left the party in March 2020)
- Sikandar Siddique (left the party in March 2020)
- Susanne Zimmer (left the party in March 2020)

=== 2022 ===
The following members were elected in 2022.

- Franciska Rosenkilde: Political leader
- Torsten Gejl: Political spokesperson
- Helene Liliendahl Brydensholt
- Sascha Faxe
- Christina Olumeko
- Theresa Scavenius (left the party in september 2023)

=== 2026 ===
The following members were elected in 2026.

- Franciska Rosenkilde: Political leader
- Torsten Gejl
- Signe Wenneberg
- Elise Sydendal
- Anna Bjerre

== Election results ==
=== Parliament ===
Election	Leader	Votes	%	Seats	+/-	Government
2015	Uffe Elbæk	168,788	4.8 (#6)	9 / 179	New	Opposition
2019	Uffe Elbæk	104,148	3.0 (#8)	5 / 179	▼4	Opposition
2022	Franciska Rosenkilde	117,567	3.3 (#11)	6 / 179	▲1	Opposition
2026	Franciska Rosenkilde	91,770	2.6 (#11)	5 / 179	▼1	External support

=== Local elections ===
Municipal elections

Year	Leader	Seats	
Year	Leader	#	±
2017	Uffe Elbæk	20 / 2,432	New
2021	Franciska Rosenkilde	5 / 2,436	▼15
2025	Franciska Rosenkilde	7 / 2,432	▲2

Regional elections

Year	Seats	
Year	#	±
2017	3 / 205	New
2021	0 / 205	▼3
2025	0 / 205	0

Mayors

Year	Seats	
Year	No.	±
2017	1 / 98	New
2021	0 / 98	▼1
2025	0 / 98	0

=== European Parliament ===
Year	List leader	Votes	%	Seats	+/–	EP Group
2019	Rasmus Nordqvist	92,964	3.37 (#9)	0 / 14	New	–
2024	Jan Kristoffersen	65,228	2.66 (#11)	0 / 15	0	–
