= Susanne Zimmer =

Danish politician (born 1960)

Member of the Folketing
- Incumbent
- Assumed office 5 June 2019
- Constituency: North Zealand

Personal details
- Born: 9 June 1960 (age 65) Brønderslev, Denmark
- Party: Independent Greens (from 2020); The Alternative (2019—2020)

Susanne Zimmer (born 9 June 1960 in Brønderslev) is a Danish politician, who is a member of the Folketing. She was elected in the 2019 Danish general election as a member of The Alternative. She is the co-founder of Independent Greens, though is an independent politician in the Folketing.

== Political career ==
Zimmer was elected into parliament in the 2019 election as a member of The Alternative. In March 2020 S Zimmer and three other members of The Alternative left the party. Zimmer founded the new Independent Greens party with Sikandar Siddique and Uffe Elbæk.
