= Niko Grünfeld =

Danish politician (born 1975)

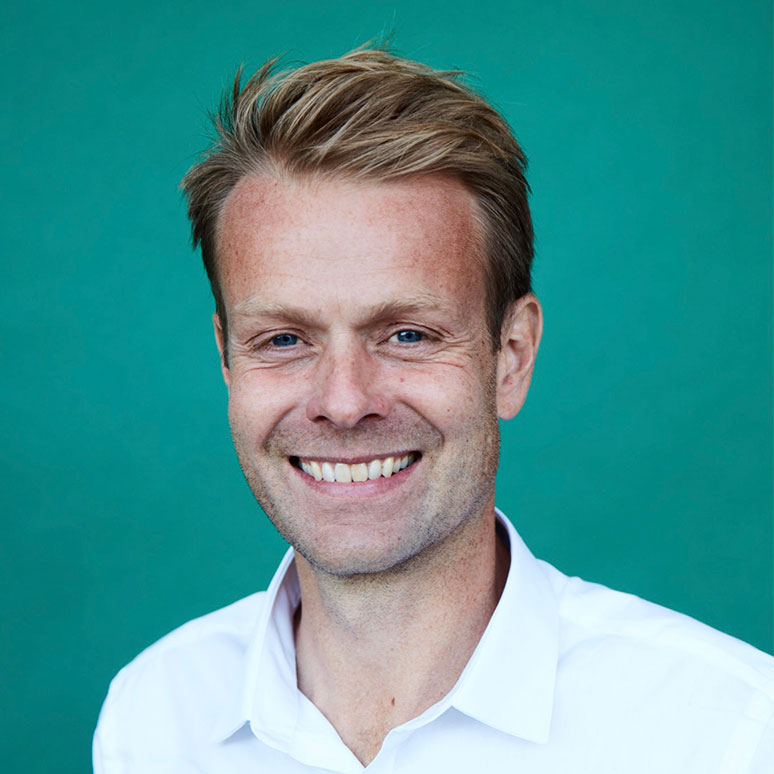
Grünfeld in 2021

Niko Grünfeld (born 13 March 1975 in Sønderborg) is a Danish politician. He served as Mayor of Culture and Leisure to the Copenhagen Municipality from January to October 2018 for The Alternative political party, which he co-founded in 2013. In April 2020, he co-founded the Independent Greens party and has since served on the Copenhagen City Council for that party.
