= Sikandar Siddique =

Danish politician

Member of the Folketing
- In office 5 June 2019 – 1 November 2022
- Constituency: Greater Copenhagen

Leader of the Independent Greens
- Incumbent
- Assumed office 7 September 2020

Personal details
- Born: 4 October 1986 (age 39) Copenhagen, Denmark
- Party: Independent Greens (from 2020); The Alternative (2019–2020)

Sikandar Siddique (born 4 October 1986 in Copenhagen) is a Danish politician who was a member of the Folketing from 2019 to 2022. He was elected in the 2019 Danish general election as a member of The Alternative. He is the co-founder and leader of Independent Greens.

== Political career ==
Siddique was elected into parliament in the 2019 election as a member of The Alternative. In March 2020 Siddique and three other members of The Alternative left the party. Siddique founded the new Independent Greens party with Susanne Zimmer and Uffe Elbæk. Siddique was not re-elected in the 2022 Danish general election.
