= Franciska Rosenkilde =

Danish geographer and politician (born 1976)

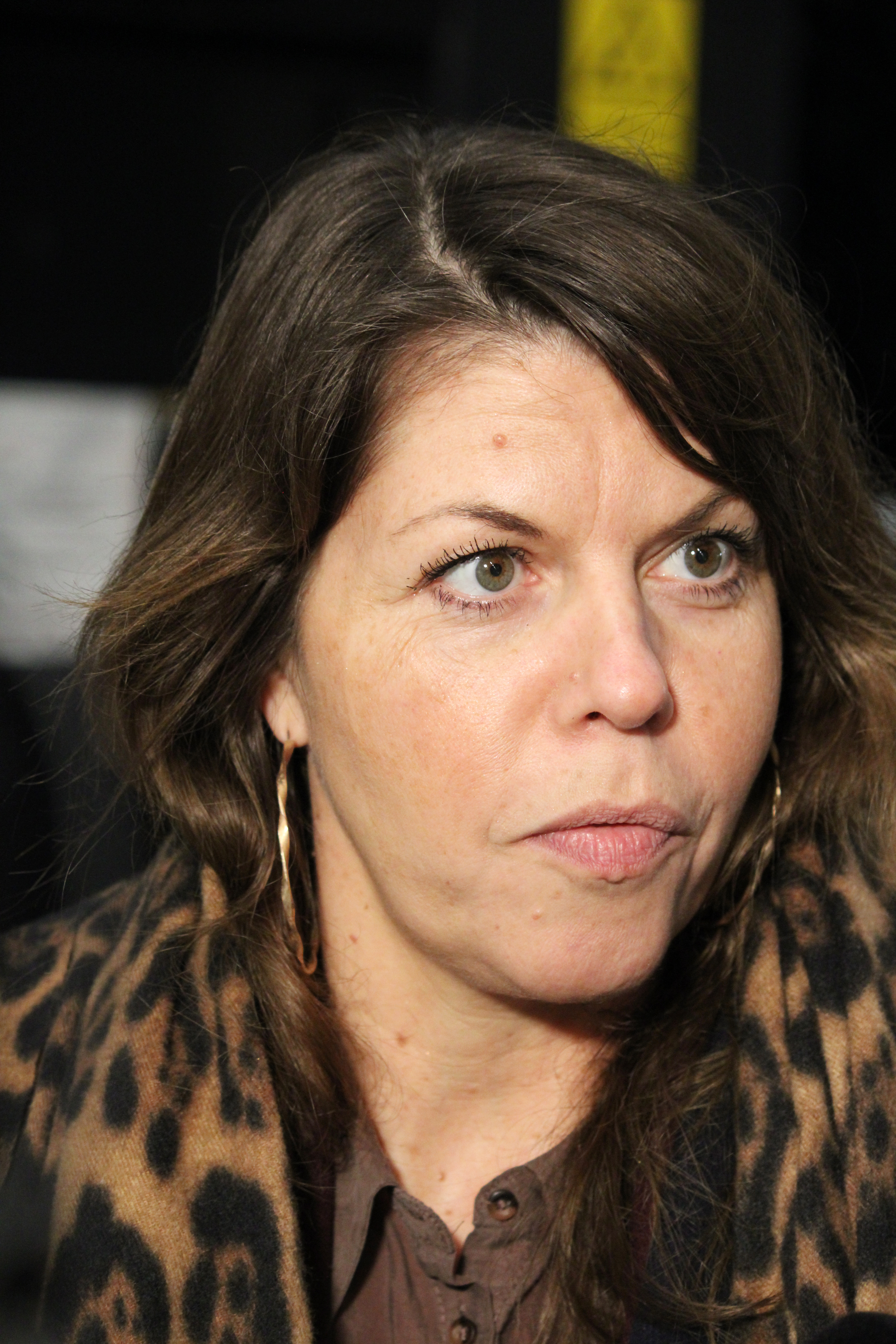
- Rosenkilde in 2026

Member of the Folketing
- Incumbent
- Assumed office 1 November 2022

Leader of the Alternative
- Incumbent
- Assumed office 7 February 2021
- Preceded by: Josephine Fock

Personal details
- Born: 19 March 1976 (age 50) Copenhagen, Denmark
- Party: The Alternative (2014–present)
- Education: Metropol University College (BA); University of Copenhagen (MA)
- Occupation: Geographer and politician
- Website: Official website

Franciska Rosenkilde (born 19 March 1976) is a Danish geographer and politician who has been the leader of The Alternative since February 2021, replacing Josephine Fock. Alongside five other members of The Alternative, Rosenkilde was elected to the Folketing in November 2022.

== Education and civil career ==
Rosenkilde has a professional bachelor's degree in health and nutrition from Metropol University College, which she studied from 2006 to 2010. In 2012, she began a master's degree in geography from the University of Copenhagen, which she completed in 2015. Rosenkilde wrote her master's thesis on food systems and climate change.

Prior to her political career, she worked as a chef and as a mediator of diet and lifestyle.

== Political career ==
Rosenkilde became a member of The Alternative in 2014 after a political debate in the party at Bremen Teater.

In 2017, she was elected to the Copenhagen City Council in the local elections. Here she sat as a member of the Citizens' Representation and The Alternative's group chairperson at Copenhagen City Hall until October 2018.

In October 2018, after a vote in The Alternative in Copenhagen, Rosenkilde was elected to the post of Mayor of Culture and Leisure, after the party's former mayor, Niko Grünfeld, had resigned. She received 97 votes out of 188.

=== Party leadership ===
At an extraordinary national meeting, on 7 February 2021, she was elected by party members to become political leader of the Alternative. Four candidates ran, and Rosenkilde received 260 votes out of a total of 471.
