= Horsens (nomination district) =

Danish election district

- Horsens
- Nomination district constituency for the Folketing
- Location of Horsens within East Jutland

- Location of East Jutland within Denmark
- Municipalities: Horsens
- Constituency: East Jutland
- Electorate: 66,242 (2022)

Current constituency
- Created: 1849 (as constituency); 1920 (as nomination district)

Horsens nominating district is one of the 92 nominating districts that exists for Danish elections following the 2007 municipal reform. It consists of Horsens Municipality. It was created in 1849 as a constituency, and has been a nomination district since 1920, though its boundaries have been changed since then.

In general elections, it tends to vote a bit more for parties commonly associated to the blue bloc.

== General elections results ==
=== General elections in the 2020s ===
2022 Danish general election

Parties	Vote		
Parties	Votes	%	+ / -
Social Democrats	16,707	30.79	+2.99
Venstre	7,242	13.35	-10.33
Liberal Alliance	5,438	10.02	+6.88
Moderates	4,991	9.20	New
Denmark Democrats	4,906	9.04	New
Green Left	3,540	6.52	+0.02
Conservatives	2,634	4.85	-1.26
New Right	2,333	4.30	+1.91
Red–Green Alliance	1,905	3.51	-1.58
Social Liberals	1,541	2.84	-4.07
Danish People's Party	1,477	2.72	-8.79
The Alternative	1,042	1.92	-0.13
Christian Democrats	254	0.47	-1.22
Independent Greens	200	0.37	New
Jesper Antonsen	39	0.07	New
Chresten H. Ibsen	8	0.01	-0.09
Total	54,257		

=== General elections in the 2010s ===
2019 Danish general election

Parties	Vote		
Parties	Votes	%	+ / -
Social Democrats	14,601	27.80	+1.17
Venstre	12,437	23.68	+5.22
Danish People's Party	6,042	11.51	-13.17
Social Liberals	3,627	6.91	+3.45
Green Left	3,411	6.50	+2.83
Conservatives	3,208	6.11	+3.63
Red–Green Alliance	2,672	5.09	-1.53
Liberal Alliance	1,647	3.14	-6.63
New Right	1,253	2.39	New
Stram Kurs	1,148	2.19	New
The Alternative	1,075	2.05	-1.44
Christian Democrats	890	1.69	+1.10
Klaus Riskær Pedersen Party	442	0.84	New
Chresten H. Ibsen	53	0.10	New
Hans Schultz	9	0.02	New
Total	52,515		

2015 Danish general election

Parties	Vote		
Parties	Votes	%	+ / -
Social Democrats	13,900	26.63	+0.43
Danish People's Party	12,878	24.68	+11.47
Venstre	9,634	18.46	-10.17
Liberal Alliance	5,098	9.77	+3.46
Red–Green Alliance	3,454	6.62	+1.79
Green Left	1,914	3.67	-5.04
The Alternative	1,819	3.49	New
Social Liberals	1,808	3.46	-4.72
Conservatives	1,293	2.48	-0.93
Christian Democrats	309	0.59	+0.10
Yahya Hassan	78	0.15	New
Poul Gundersen	2	0.00	New
Peter Ymer Nielsen	2	0.00	New
Total	52,189		

2011 Danish general election

Parties	Vote		
Parties	Votes	%	+ / -
Venstre	14,855	28.63	-1.73
Social Democrats	13,595	26.20	-1.07
Danish People's Party	6,851	13.21	-1.31
Green Left	4,521	8.71	-2.38
Social Liberals	4,242	8.18	+4.60
Liberal Alliance	3,272	6.31	+3.09
Red–Green Alliance	2,508	4.83	+3.71
Conservatives	1,770	3.41	-4.87
Christian Democrats	252	0.49	-0.05
Ibrahim Gøkhan	9	0.02	New
Janus Kramer Møller	5	0.01	New
Total	51,880		

=== General elections in the 2000s ===
2007 Danish general election

Parties	Vote		
Parties	Votes	%	+ / -
Venstre	15,154	30.36	-0.82
Social Democrats	13,610	27.27	-0.21
Danish People's Party	7,247	14.52	+0.14
Green Left	5,536	11.09	+5.24
Conservatives	4,131	8.28	-0.42
Social Liberals	1,788	3.58	-3.34
New Alliance	1,605	3.22	New
Red–Green Alliance	557	1.12	-1.90
Christian Democrats	271	0.54	-0.76
Jes Krogh	8	0.02	New
Total	49,907		

2005 Danish general election

Parties	Vote		
Parties	Votes	%	+ / -
Venstre	13,165	31.15	-0.73
Social Democrats	11,604	27.45	-3.99
Danish People's Party	6,073	14.37	+1.22
Conservatives	3,674	8.69	+0.37
Social Liberals	2,920	6.91	+2.95
Green Left	2,472	5.85	+0.47
Red–Green Alliance	1,275	3.02	+1.13
Christian Democrats	550	1.30	-0.41
Centre Democrats	373	0.88	-0.58
Minority Party	120	0.28	New
Benjamin Blender	41	0.10	-0.03
Total	42,267		

2001 Danish general election

Parties	Vote		
Parties	Votes	%	+ / -
Venstre	13,801	31.88	+7.99
Social Democrats	13,612	31.44	-9.53
Danish People's Party	5,692	13.15	+5.38
Conservatives	3,601	8.32	+0.57
Green Left	2,328	5.38	-1.08
Social Liberals	1,715	3.96	+1.07
Red–Green Alliance	818	1.89	-0.46
Christian People's Party	742	1.71	-0.01
Centre Democrats	633	1.46	-2.91
Progress Party	296	0.68	-0.79
Benjamin Blender	55	0.13	New
Total	43,293		

=== General elections in the 1990s ===
1998 Danish general election

Parties	Vote		
Parties	Votes	%	+ / -
Social Democrats	17,415	40.97	+2.39
Venstre	10,155	23.89	-1.46
Danish People's Party	3,301	7.77	New
Conservatives	3,295	7.75	-5.48
Green Left	2,746	6.46	-0.67
Centre Democrats	1,857	4.37	+1.94
Social Liberals	1,230	2.89	-0.88
Red–Green Alliance	998	2.35	+0.17
Christian People's Party	731	1.72	+0.52
Progress Party	624	1.47	-4.60
Democratic Renewal	127	0.30	New
Birgitte Bjerring Sonneby	25	0.06	New
Total	42,504		

1994 Danish general election

Parties	Vote		
Parties	Votes	%	+ / -
Social Democrats	16,050	38.58	-2.33
Venstre	10,546	25.35	+9.56
Conservatives	5,503	13.23	-2.52
Green Left	2,965	7.13	-0.32
Progress Party	2,523	6.07	-0.76
Social Liberals	1,569	3.77	+1.11
Centre Democrats	1,011	2.43	-2.43
Red–Green Alliance	906	2.18	+1.00
Christian People's Party	498	1.20	-0.48
Knud Haugmark	27	0.06	New
Total	41,598		

1990 Danish general election

Parties	Vote		
Parties	Votes	%	+ / -
Social Democrats	16,677	40.91	+6.83
Venstre	6,437	15.79	+4.11
Conservatives	6,421	15.75	-3.36
Green Left	3,036	7.45	-3.86
Progress Party	2,785	6.83	-2.75
Centre Democrats	1,981	4.86	+0.34
Social Liberals	1,084	2.66	-1.47
Christian People's Party	685	1.68	+0.27
Common Course	581	1.43	-0.05
Red–Green Alliance	482	1.18	New
The Greens	426	1.04	-0.27
Justice Party of Denmark	172	0.42	New
Total	40,767		

=== General elections in the 1980s ===
1988 Danish general election

Parties	Vote		
Parties	Votes	%	+ / -
Social Democrats	14,380	34.08	+0.44
Conservatives	8,061	19.11	-2.06
Venstre	4,928	11.68	+1.65
Green Left	4,771	11.31	-2.07
Progress Party	4,043	9.58	+4.72
Centre Democrats	1,907	4.52	+0.17
Social Liberals	1,743	4.13	-0.74
Common Course	625	1.48	-0.50
Christian People's Party	596	1.41	-0.28
The Greens	554	1.31	-0.19
Communist Party of Denmark	488	1.16	-0.26
Left Socialists	94	0.22	-0.29
Total	42,190		

1987 Danish general election

Parties	Vote		
Parties	Votes	%	+ / -
Social Democrats	14,327	33.64	-1.99
Conservatives	9,016	21.17	-2.55
Green Left	5,699	13.38	+3.06
Venstre	4,271	10.03	-2.27
Social Liberals	2,072	4.87	+0.58
Progress Party	2,068	4.86	+1.52
Centre Democrats	1,851	4.35	-0.67
Common Course	845	1.98	New
Christian People's Party	720	1.69	-0.49
The Greens	637	1.50	New
Communist Party of Denmark	604	1.42	+0.82
Left Socialists	218	0.51	-0.73
Justice Party of Denmark	191	0.45	-0.86
Humanist Party	49	0.12	New
Socialist Workers Party	14	0.03	-0.01
Marxist–Leninists Party	6	0.01	0.00
Total	42,588		

1984 Danish general election

Parties	Vote		
Parties	Votes	%	+ / -
Social Democrats	14,976	35.63	-1.83
Conservatives	9,968	23.72	+9.88
Venstre	5,168	12.30	+1.72
Green Left	4,338	10.32	+0.24
Centre Democrats	2,112	5.02	-3.58
Social Liberals	1,802	4.29	+0.43
Progress Party	1,405	3.34	-7.00
Christian People's Party	915	2.18	+0.50
Justice Party of Denmark	550	1.31	+0.09
Left Socialists	522	1.24	+0.06
Communist Party of Denmark	254	0.60	-0.43
Socialist Workers Party	15	0.04	-0.01
Marxist–Leninists Party	5	0.01	New
A. Egedal Christoffersen	2	0.00	New
Total	42,032		

1981 Danish general election

Parties	Vote		
Parties	Votes	%	+ / -
Social Democrats	14,704	37.46	-5.08
Conservatives	5,434	13.84	+2.05
Venstre	4,155	10.58	-1.87
Progress Party	4,060	10.34	-1.70
Green Left	3,957	10.08	+4.60
Centre Democrats	3,374	8.60	+5.66
Social Liberals	1,515	3.86	-0.20
Christian People's Party	658	1.68	-0.34
Justice Party of Denmark	477	1.22	-1.20
Left Socialists	462	1.18	-0.83
Communist Party of Denmark	405	1.03	-0.92
Communist Workers Party	35	0.09	-0.21
Socialist Workers Party	19	0.05	New
Total	39,255		

=== General elections in the 1970s ===
1979 Danish general election

Parties	Vote		
Parties	Votes	%	+ / -
Social Democrats	16,924	42.54	+1.44
Venstre	4,952	12.45	-0.15
Progress Party	4,791	12.04	-3.15
Conservatives	4,689	11.79	+4.10
Green Left	2,182	5.48	+2.22
Social Liberals	1,617	4.06	+1.23
Centre Democrats	1,170	2.94	-2.40
Justice Party of Denmark	962	2.42	-0.93
Christian People's Party	804	2.02	-0.69
Left Socialists	799	2.01	+0.58
Communist Party of Denmark	776	1.95	-1.98
Communist Workers Party	120	0.30	New
Total	39,786		

1977 Danish general election

Parties	Vote		
Parties	Votes	%	+ / -
Social Democrats	15,947	41.10	+7.94
Progress Party	5,894	15.19	+1.10
Venstre	4,889	12.60	-11.72
Conservatives	2,984	7.69	+3.59
Centre Democrats	2,072	5.34	+3.28
Communist Party of Denmark	1,524	3.93	-0.47
Justice Party of Denmark	1,301	3.35	+1.34
Green Left	1,266	3.26	-0.74
Social Liberals	1,099	2.83	-2.91
Christian People's Party	1,050	2.71	-2.20
Left Socialists	553	1.43	+0.25
Pensioners' Party	225	0.58	New
Total	38,804		

1975 Danish general election

Parties	Vote		
Parties	Votes	%	+ / -
Social Democrats	12,797	33.16	+3.30
Venstre	9,384	24.32	+12.61
Progress Party	5,439	14.09	-3.62
Social Liberals	2,214	5.74	-4.83
Christian People's Party	1,896	4.91	+1.17
Communist Party of Denmark	1,699	4.40	+1.41
Conservatives	1,583	4.10	-3.23
Green Left	1,543	4.00	-0.51
Centre Democrats	796	2.06	-5.43
Justice Party of Denmark	776	2.01	-1.15
Left Socialists	455	1.18	+0.25
Erik Holm	6	0.02	New
Elin Høgsbro Appel	1	0.00	New
Total	38,589		

1973 Danish general election

Parties	Vote		
Parties	Votes	%	+ / -
Social Democrats	11,468	29.86	-13.49
Progress Party	6,800	17.71	New
Venstre	4,496	11.71	-4.02
Social Liberals	4,059	10.57	-2.69
Centre Democrats	2,877	7.49	New
Conservatives	2,816	7.33	-6.83
Green Left	1,733	4.51	-2.94
Christian People's Party	1,437	3.74	+1.81
Justice Party of Denmark	1,214	3.16	+1.18
Communist Party of Denmark	1,147	2.99	+1.76
Left Socialists	359	0.93	+0.02
Total	38,406		

1971 Danish general election

Parties	Vote		
Parties	Votes	%	+ / -
Social Democrats	15,651	43.35	-3.52
Venstre	5,677	15.73	+3.41
Conservatives	5,113	14.16	-3.03
Social Liberals	4,787	13.26	+1.71
Green Left	2,691	7.45	+0.16
Justice Party of Denmark	713	1.98	+1.28
Christian People's Party	697	1.93	New
Communist Party of Denmark	443	1.23	+0.12
Left Socialists	328	0.91	-0.80
Total	36,100		

=== General elections in the 1960s ===
1968 Danish general election

Parties	Vote		
Parties	Votes	%	+ / -
Social Democrats	10,623	46.87	-3.42
Conservatives	3,896	17.19	+2.33
Venstre	2,793	12.32	-1.39
Social Liberals	2,617	11.55	+6.84
Green Left	1,653	7.29	-4.83
Left Socialists	388	1.71	New
Communist Party of Denmark	251	1.11	+0.26
Liberal Centre	202	0.89	-0.82
Justice Party of Denmark	158	0.70	+0.04
Independent Party	83	0.37	-0.73
Total	22,664		

1966 Danish general election

Parties	Vote		
Parties	Votes	%	+ / -
Social Democrats	11,389	50.29	-5.05
Conservatives	3,365	14.86	-1.34
Venstre	3,105	13.71	-0.30
Green Left	2,744	12.12	+5.25
Social Liberals	1,066	4.71	+2.21
Liberal Centre	387	1.71	New
Independent Party	250	1.10	-0.99
Communist Party of Denmark	193	0.85	-0.40
Justice Party of Denmark	149	0.66	-0.41
Total	22,648		

1964 Danish general election

Parties	Vote		
Parties	Votes	%	+ / -
Social Democrats	12,250	55.34	0.00
Conservatives	3,586	16.20	-0.10
Venstre	3,101	14.01	+0.35
Green Left	1,520	6.87	-0.24
Social Liberals	553	2.50	+0.45
Independent Party	463	2.09	-0.90
Communist Party of Denmark	276	1.25	+0.29
Justice Party of Denmark	236	1.07	-0.52
Peace Politics People's Party	81	0.37	New
Danish Unity	69	0.31	New
Total	22,135		

1960 Danish general election

Parties	Vote		
Parties	Votes	%	+ / -
Social Democrats	11,844	55.34	+0.29
Conservatives	3,488	16.30	+0.19
Venstre	2,924	13.66	-2.06
Green Left	1,521	7.11	New
Independent Party	640	2.99	+0.56
Social Liberals	439	2.05	-1.69
Justice Party of Denmark	341	1.59	-2.44
Communist Party of Denmark	206	0.96	-1.97
Total	21,403		

=== General elections in the 1950s ===
1957 Danish general election

Parties	Vote		
Parties	Votes	%	+ / -
Social Democrats	11,316	55.05	-0.38
Conservatives	3,311	16.11	-3.53
Venstre	3,231	15.72	+4.03
Justice Party of Denmark	828	4.03	+1.21
Social Liberals	768	3.74	+0.55
Communist Party of Denmark	602	2.93	-1.66
Independent Party	499	2.43	-0.21
Total	20,555		

September 1953 Danish Folketing election

Parties	Vote		
Parties	Votes	%	+ / -
Social Democrats	10,880	55.43	+2.47
Conservatives	3,855	19.64	-2.51
Venstre	2,294	11.69	+1.36
Communist Party of Denmark	901	4.59	-0.50
Social Liberals	627	3.19	-1.05
Justice Party of Denmark	553	2.82	-1.81
Independent Party	518	2.64	New
Total	19,628		

April 1953 Danish Folketing election

Parties	Vote		
Parties	Votes	%	+ / -
Social Democrats	10,125	52.96	+0.84
Conservatives	4,234	22.15	-3.01
Venstre	1,975	10.33	+1.74
Communist Party of Denmark	974	5.09	+0.11
Justice Party of Denmark	886	4.63	-1.80
Social Liberals	810	4.24	+1.53
Danish Unity	113	0.59	New
Total	19,117		

1950 Danish Folketing election

Parties	Vote		
Parties	Votes	%	+ / -
Social Democrats	9,859	52.12	-0.51
Conservatives	4,760	25.16	+8.63
Venstre	1,625	8.59	-3.83
Justice Party of Denmark	1,217	6.43	+0.03
Communist Party of Denmark	942	4.98	-3.80
Social Liberals	513	2.71	+1.10
Total	18,916		

=== General elections in the 1940s ===
1947 Danish Folketing election

Parties	Vote		
Parties	Votes	%	+ / -
Social Democrats	9,713	52.63	+10.84
Conservatives	3,050	16.53	-6.58
Venstre	2,293	12.42	+3.56
Communist Party of Denmark	1,620	8.78	-10.26
Justice Party of Denmark	1,181	6.40	+4.62
Danish Unity	301	1.63	-1.95
Social Liberals	297	1.61	-0.20
Total	18,455		

1945 Danish Folketing election

Parties	Vote		
Parties	Votes	%	+ / -
Social Democrats	7,538	41.79	-19.54
Conservatives	4,169	23.11	-1.93
Communist Party of Denmark	3,435	19.04	New
Venstre	1,599	8.86	+2.79
Danish Unity	646	3.58	+1.62
Social Liberals	326	1.81	-0.65
Justice Party of Denmark	321	1.78	+0.18
Niels Lauritsen	4	0.02	New
Total	18,038		

1943 Danish Folketing election

Parties	Vote		
Parties	Votes	%	+ / -
Social Democrats	10,631	61.33	+3.12
Conservatives	4,340	25.04	+1.67
Venstre	1,052	6.07	+1.03
Social Liberals	427	2.46	-0.33
Danish Unity	339	1.96	+1.75
Justice Party of Denmark	277	1.60	-0.44
National Socialist Workers' Party of Denmark	256	1.48	+0.32
Farmers' Party	11	0.06	-0.19
Total	17,333		

=== General elections in the 1930s ===
1939 Danish Folketing election

Parties	Vote		
Parties	Votes	%	+ / -
Social Democrats	8,956	58.21	-5.51
Conservatives	3,595	23.37	-1.05
Communist Party of Denmark	806	5.24	+2.47
Venstre	776	5.04	+0.93
Social Liberals	429	2.79	+0.34
Justice Party of Denmark	314	2.04	-0.05
National Cooperation	260	1.69	New
National Socialist Workers' Party of Denmark	179	1.16	+0.86
Farmers' Party	38	0.25	+0.10
Danish Unity	33	0.21	New
Total	15,386		

1935 Danish Folketing election

Parties	Vote		
Parties	Votes	%	+ / -
Social Democrats	9,556	63.72	+2.83
Conservatives	3,663	24.42	-2.94
Venstre	617	4.11	-1.33
Communist Party of Denmark	415	2.77	+1.35
Social Liberals	367	2.45	-0.15
Justice Party of Denmark	313	2.09	-0.20
National Socialist Workers' Party of Denmark	45	0.30	New
Independent People's Party	22	0.15	New
Total	14,998		

1932 Danish Folketing election

Parties	Vote		
Parties	Votes	%	+ / -
Social Democrats	8,384	60.89	-1.96
Conservatives	3,767	27.36	+2.48
Venstre	749	5.44	-1.74
Social Liberals	358	2.60	-0.66
Justice Party of Denmark	316	2.29	+0.46
Communist Party of Denmark	196	1.42	New
Total	13,770		

=== General elections in the 1920s ===
1929 Danish Folketing election

Parties	Vote		
Parties	Votes	%	+ / -
Social Democrats	8,194	62.85	+4.91
Conservatives	3,244	24.88	-4.65
Venstre	936	7.18	+0.04
Social Liberals	425	3.26	-0.63
Justice Party of Denmark	239	1.83	+0.99
Total	13,038		

1926 Danish Folketing election

Parties	Vote		
Parties	Votes	%	+ / -
Social Democrats	7,616	57.94	+2.28
Conservatives	3,882	29.53	-1.91
Venstre	938	7.14	-1.36
Social Liberals	511	3.89	0.00
Justice Party of Denmark	111	0.84	+0.33
Communist Party of Denmark	86	0.65	New
Total	13,144		

1924 Danish Folketing election

Parties	Vote		
Parties	Votes	%	+ / -
Social Democrats	6,794	55.66	+2.66
Conservatives	3,838	31.44	+4.37
Venstre	1,038	8.50	-0.60
Social Liberals	475	3.89	+1.34
Justice Party of Denmark	62	0.51	New
Total	12,207		

September 1920 Danish Folketing election

Parties	Vote		
Parties	Votes	%	+ / -
Social Democrats	6,111	53.00	+4.02
Conservatives	3,121	27.07	-1.67
Venstre	1,049	9.10	-1.00
Industry Party	815	7.07	-2.35
Social Liberals	294	2.55	+0.35
Danish Left Socialist Party	140	1.21	New
Total	11,530		

July 1920 Danish Folketing election

Parties	Vote		
Parties	Votes	%	+ / -
Social Democrats	4,542	48.98	+1.63
Conservatives	2,665	28.74	-2.92
Venstre	937	10.10	+0.09
Industry Party	874	9.42	+1.57
Social Liberals	204	2.20	+0.10
Alfred M. R. Andersen	52	0.56	-0.46
Total	9,274		

April 1920 Danish Folketing election

Parties	Vote	
Parties	Votes	%
Social Democrats	4,776	47.35
Conservatives	3,194	31.66
Venstre	1,010	10.01
Industry Party	792	7.85
Social Liberals	212	2.10
Alfred M. R. Andersen	103	1.02
Total	10,087	

== European Parliament elections results ==
2024 European Parliament election in Denmark

Parties	Vote		
Parties	Votes	%	+ / -
Social Democrats	6,288	17.19	-7.36
Venstre	5,476	14.97	-7.61
Green Left	5,268	14.40	+3.89
Conservatives	3,728	10.19	+4.92
Denmark Democrats	2,910	7.96	New
Danish People's Party	2,895	7.92	-6.08
Liberal Alliance	2,812	7.69	+3.26
Moderates	2,355	6.44	New
Social Liberals	2,159	5.90	-2.23
Red–Green Alliance	1,792	4.90	+0.05
The Alternative	890	2.43	+0.08
Total	36,573		

2019 European Parliament election in Denmark

Parties	Vote		
Parties	Votes	%	+ / -
Social Democrats	9,817	24.55	+4.15
Venstre	9,031	22.58	+4.80
Danish People's Party	5,600	14.00	-17.62
Green Left	4,202	10.51	+2.63
Social Liberals	3,252	8.13	+3.75
Conservatives	2,108	5.27	-1.92
Red–Green Alliance	1,939	4.85	New
Liberal Alliance	1,770	4.43	+0.79
People's Movement against the EU	1,335	3.34	-3.76
The Alternative	939	2.35	New
Total	39,993		

2014 European Parliament election in Denmark

Parties	Vote		
Parties	Votes	%	+ / -
Danish People's Party	10,586	31.62	+13.87
Social Democrats	6,830	20.40	-1.21
Venstre	5,953	17.78	-3.49
Green Left	2,639	7.88	-5.69
Conservatives	2,407	7.19	-6.42
People's Movement against the EU	2,376	7.10	+0.82
Social Liberals	1,467	4.38	+1.31
Liberal Alliance	1,219	3.64	+2.99
Total	33,477		

2009 European Parliament election in Denmark

Parties	Vote		
Parties	Votes	%	+ / -
Social Democrats	7,310	21.61	-12.31
Venstre	7,195	21.27	+0.19
Danish People's Party	6,004	17.75	+10.53
Conservatives	4,603	13.61	+3.81
Green Left	4,590	13.57	+9.14
People's Movement against the EU	2,126	6.28	+3.30
Social Liberals	1,039	3.07	-3.32
June Movement	744	2.20	-11.26
Liberal Alliance	219	0.65	New
Total	33,830		

2004 European Parliament election in Denmark

Parties	Vote		
Parties	Votes	%	+ / -
Social Democrats	7,460	33.92	+18.40
Venstre	4,635	21.08	-3.82
June Movement	2,961	13.46	-8.66
Conservatives	2,155	9.80	+2.70
Danish People's Party	1,587	7.22	+0.75
Social Liberals	1,405	6.39	-0.92
Green Left	974	4.43	-1.14
People's Movement against the EU	656	2.98	-3.24
Christian Democrats	158	0.72	-0.57
Total	21,991		

1999 European Parliament election in Denmark

Parties	Vote		
Parties	Votes	%	+ / -
Venstre	5,914	24.90	+3.19
June Movement	5,254	22.12	+9.95
Social Democrats	3,686	15.52	+1.64
Social Liberals	1,736	7.31	+1.11
Conservatives	1,686	7.10	-7.79
Danish People's Party	1,537	6.47	New
People's Movement against the EU	1,478	6.22	-1.21
Green Left	1,324	5.57	-13.61
Centre Democrats	832	3.50	+2.84
Christian Democrats	306	1.29	+0.60
Progress Party	171	0.72	-2.47
Total	23,753		

1994 European Parliament election in Denmark

Parties	Vote		
Parties	Votes	%	+ / -
Venstre	5,520	21.71	+5.61
Green Left	4,877	19.18	+11.57
Conservatives	3,787	14.89	+0.88
Social Democrats	3,530	13.88	-14.72
June Movement	3,095	12.17	New
People's Movement against the EU	1,888	7.43	-7.75
Social Liberals	1,577	6.20	+4.09
Progress Party	810	3.19	-4.19
Christian Democrats	176	0.69	-0.91
Centre Democrats	167	0.66	-6.75
Total	25,427		

1989 European Parliament election in Denmark

Parties	Vote		
Parties	Votes	%	+ / -
Social Democrats	6,348	28.60	+5.62
Venstre	3,573	16.10	+3.13
People's Movement against the EU	3,369	15.18	-1.65
Conservatives	3,111	14.01	-8.68
Green Left	1,690	7.61	-1.89
Centre Democrats	1,644	7.41	+0.89
Progress Party	1,639	7.38	+3.92
Social Liberals	468	2.11	-0.44
Christian Democrats	356	1.60	-0.23
Total	22,198		

1984 European Parliament election in Denmark

Parties	Vote	
Parties	Votes	%
Social Democrats	5,511	22.98
Conservatives	5,442	22.69
People's Movement against the EU	4,038	16.83
Venstre	3,111	12.97
Green Left	2,279	9.50
Centre Democrats	1,565	6.52
Progress Party	829	3.46
Social Liberals	611	2.55
Christian Democrats	440	1.83
Left Socialists	160	0.67
Total	23,986	

== Referendums ==
2022 Danish European Union opt-out referendum

Option	Votes	%
✓ YES	27,296	64.71
X NO	14,887	35.29

2015 Danish European Union opt-out referendum

Option	Votes	%
X NO	25,533	58.12
✓ YES	18,395	41.88

2014 Danish Unified Patent Court membership referendum

Option	Votes	%
✓ YES	19,472	59.45
X NO	13,280	40.55

2009 Danish Act of Succession referendum

Option	Votes	%
✓ YES	28,093	86.92
X NO	4,228	13.08

2000 Danish euro referendum

Option	Votes	%
X NO	24,252	55.67
✓ YES	19,311	44.33

1998 Danish Amsterdam Treaty referendum

Option	Votes	%
✓ YES	19,656	53.17
X NO	17,310	46.83

1993 Danish Maastricht Treaty referendum

Option	Votes	%
✓ YES	24,478	57.22
X NO	18,299	42.78

1992 Danish Maastricht Treaty referendum

Option	Votes	%
X NO	21,491	52.32
✓ YES	19,586	47.68

1986 Danish Single European Act referendum

Option	Votes	%
✓ YES	20,099	56.64
X NO	15,384	43.36

1972 Danish European Communities membership referendum

Option	Votes	%
✓ YES	25,561	66.30
X NO	12,995	33.70

1953 Danish constitutional and electoral age referendum

Option	Votes	%
✓ YES	11,721	77.28
X NO	3,445	22.72
21 years	8,145	51.86
23 years	7,562	48.14

1939 Danish constitutional referendum

Option	Votes	%
✓ YES	12,048	93.71
X NO	808	6.29
