= Gentofte (nomination district) =

- Gentofte
- Nomination district constituency for the Folketing
- Location of Gentofte within Greater Copenhagen

- Location of Greater Copenhagen within Denmark
- Municipalities: Gentofte
- Constituency: Greater Copenhagen
- Electorate: 50,631 (2022)

Current constituency
- Created: 1915

Gentofte nominating district is one of the 92 nominating districts that exists for Danish elections following the 2007 municipal reform. It consists of Gentofte Municipality. It was created in 1915 with its current boundary, though from 1950 to 2007 the other half of the municipality was part of a separate Hellerup nomination district.

In general elections, the district is a very strong area for parties commonly associated with the blue bloc.

== General elections results ==
=== General elections in the 2020s ===
2022 Danish general election

Parties	Vote		
Parties	Votes	%	+ / -
Venstre	7,526	16.76	-8.47
Conservatives	6,546	14.58	-6.02
Moderates	6,462	14.39	New
Liberal Alliance	6,449	14.36	+9.59
Social Democrats	5,717	12.73	+1.20
Social Liberals	3,026	6.74	-7.96
Green Left	2,747	6.12	-0.08
Red–Green Alliance	1,809	4.03	-1.11
The Alternative	1,698	3.78	+0.91
New Right	930	2.07	-0.15
Danish People's Party	906	2.02	-1.59
Denmark Democrats	747	1.66	New
Independent Greens	200	0.45	New
Christian Democrats	93	0.21	-0.72
Jovan Tasevski	32	0.07	New
Henrik Vendelbo Petersen	19	0.04	New
Total	44,907		

=== General elections in the 2010s ===
2019 Danish general election

Parties	Vote		
Parties	Votes	%	+ / -
Venstre	11,300	25.23	+3.91
Conservatives	9,226	20.60	+10.49
Social Liberals	6,586	14.70	+5.63
Social Democrats	5,163	11.53	-5.91
Green Left	2,779	6.20	+2.97
Red–Green Alliance	2,300	5.14	-0.03
Liberal Alliance	2,138	4.77	-12.72
Danish People's Party	1,617	3.61	-6.88
The Alternative	1,286	2.87	-2.46
New Right	995	2.22	New
Stram Kurs	501	1.12	New
Christian Democrats	415	0.93	+0.63
Klaus Riskær Pedersen Party	378	0.84	New
Mads Palsvig	105	0.23	New
Christian B. Olesen	1	0.00	New
Total	44,790		

2015 Danish general election

Parties	Vote		
Parties	Votes	%	+ / -
Venstre	9,600	21.32	-9.50
Liberal Alliance	7,876	17.49	+7.28
Social Democrats	7,850	17.44	+5.58
Danish People's Party	4,722	10.49	+3.61
Conservatives	4,553	10.11	-4.89
Social Liberals	4,083	9.07	-6.00
The Alternative	2,399	5.33	New
Red–Green Alliance	2,327	5.17	+0.06
Green Left	1,452	3.23	-1.53
Christian Democrats	135	0.30	+0.04
Asif Ahmad	15	0.03	New
Christian Olesen	7	0.02	New
Total	45,019		

2011 Danish general election

Parties	Vote		
Parties	Votes	%	+ / -
Venstre	13,877	30.82	+5.31
Social Liberals	6,787	15.07	+7.07
Conservatives	6,755	15.00	-12.80
Social Democrats	5,342	11.86	-1.80
Liberal Alliance	4,599	10.21	+4.69
Danish People's Party	3,099	6.88	-0.99
Red–Green Alliance	2,299	5.11	+2.72
Green Left	2,142	4.76	-4.10
Christian Democrats	116	0.26	-0.13
Christian H. Hansen	17	0.04	New
Total	45,033		

=== General elections in the 2000s ===
2007 Danish general election

Parties	Vote		
Parties	Votes	%	+ / -
Conservatives	12,080	27.80	+1.83
Venstre	11,085	25.51	-1.69
Social Democrats	5,938	13.66	+0.01
Green Left	3,851	8.86	+3.53
Social Liberals	3,477	8.00	-5.42
Danish People's Party	3,420	7.87	-1.15
New Alliance	2,399	5.52	New
Red–Green Alliance	1,038	2.39	-0.64
Christian Democrats	170	0.39	-0.61
Feride Istogu Gillesberg	0	0.00	New
Janus Kramer Møller	0	0.00	New
Total	43,458		

2005 Danish general election

Parties	Vote		
Parties	Votes	%	+ / -
Venstre	5,780	27.20	-7.79
Conservatives	5,519	25.97	+8.57
Social Democrats	2,901	13.65	-2.81
Social Liberals	2,852	13.42	+4.87
Danish People's Party	1,916	9.02	+0.41
Green Left	1,132	5.33	-0.67
Red–Green Alliance	643	3.03	+0.62
Centre Democrats	246	1.16	-2.20
Christian Democrats	213	1.00	-0.96
Minority Party	46	0.22	New
Nahid Yazdanyar	2	0.01	New
Total	21,250		

2001 Danish general election

Parties	Vote		
Parties	Votes	%	+ / -
Venstre	7,697	34.99	+8.58
Conservatives	3,828	17.40	-3.46
Social Democrats	3,621	16.46	-3.46
Danish People's Party	1,893	8.61	+1.56
Social Liberals	1,880	8.55	+2.71
Green Left	1,319	6.00	-0.98
Centre Democrats	740	3.36	-3.88
Red–Green Alliance	530	2.41	-0.20
Christian People's Party	432	1.96	+0.06
Progress Party	56	0.25	-0.53
Total	21,996		

=== General elections in the 1990s ===
1998 Danish general election

Parties	Vote		
Parties	Votes	%	+ / -
Venstre	5,842	26.41	+3.94
Conservatives	4,614	20.86	-11.66
Social Democrats	4,408	19.92	+2.43
Centre Democrats	1,602	7.24	+2.48
Danish People's Party	1,560	7.05	New
Green Left	1,545	6.98	+0.79
Social Liberals	1,292	5.84	-1.12
Red–Green Alliance	577	2.61	-0.10
Christian People's Party	421	1.90	+0.78
Progress Party	172	0.78	-3.63
Democratic Renewal	51	0.23	New
Mogens Glistrup	32	0.14	-0.21
Anders Kofoed	5	0.02	New
Poul Bregninge	2	0.01	New
Total	22,123		

1994 Danish general election

Parties	Vote		
Parties	Votes	%	+ / -
Conservatives	7,344	32.52	-0.61
Venstre	5,076	22.47	+7.49
Social Democrats	3,951	17.49	-2.49
Social Liberals	1,571	6.96	+1.05
Green Left	1,397	6.19	-0.66
Centre Democrats	1,075	4.76	-4.13
Progress Party	996	4.41	+0.33
Red–Green Alliance	613	2.71	+0.87
Christian People's Party	252	1.12	-0.47
Niels I. Meyer	185	0.82	New
Mogens Glistrup	78	0.35	New
Preben Møller Hansen	39	0.17	New
John Ziegler	5	0.02	New
Torben Faber	4	0.02	New
Total	22,586		

1990 Danish general election

Parties	Vote		
Parties	Votes	%	+ / -
Conservatives	7,193	33.13	-3.21
Social Democrats	4,338	19.98	+5.81
Venstre	3,251	14.98	+5.07
Centre Democrats	1,929	8.89	-0.20
Green Left	1,486	6.85	-2.86
Social Liberals	1,283	5.91	-2.42
Progress Party	885	4.08	-2.48
Red–Green Alliance	399	1.84	New
Christian People's Party	345	1.59	+0.32
Common Course	297	1.37	+0.38
The Greens	206	0.95	-1.39
Justice Party of Denmark	89	0.41	New
Humanist Party	8	0.04	New
Total	21,709		

=== General elections in the 1980s ===
1988 Danish general election

Parties	Vote		
Parties	Votes	%	+ / -
Conservatives	8,176	36.34	-2.15
Social Democrats	3,189	14.17	+0.48
Venstre	2,229	9.91	+4.18
Green Left	2,184	9.71	-1.14
Centre Democrats	2,045	9.09	-0.52
Social Liberals	1,874	8.33	-1.67
Progress Party	1,475	6.56	+2.78
The Greens	527	2.34	+0.23
Christian People's Party	285	1.27	-0.48
Common Course	222	0.99	-0.07
Left Socialists	159	0.71	-0.95
Communist Party of Denmark	132	0.59	-0.14
Leif Hilt	2	0.01	New
Total	22,499		

1987 Danish general election

Parties	Vote		
Parties	Votes	%	+ / -
Conservatives	8,780	38.49	-1.88
Social Democrats	3,122	13.69	-2.41
Green Left	2,476	10.85	+1.28
Social Liberals	2,281	10.00	+1.73
Centre Democrats	2,192	9.61	+3.04
Venstre	1,307	5.73	-2.58
Progress Party	862	3.78	+0.65
The Greens	482	2.11	New
Christian People's Party	400	1.75	-0.08
Left Socialists	378	1.66	-2.27
Common Course	241	1.06	New
Communist Party of Denmark	166	0.73	+0.19
Justice Party of Denmark	79	0.35	-0.98
Humanist Party	37	0.16	New
Socialist Workers Party	6	0.03	0.00
Marxist–Leninists Party	3	0.01	0.00
Carsten Grøn-Nielsen	0	0.00	-0.01
Per Hillersborg	0	0.00	New
Total	22,812		

1984 Danish general election

Parties	Vote		
Parties	Votes	%	+ / -
Conservatives	9,518	40.37	+6.77
Social Democrats	3,795	16.10	-1.72
Green Left	2,257	9.57	+0.34
Venstre	1,958	8.31	+2.45
Social Liberals	1,950	8.27	+1.76
Centre Democrats	1,549	6.57	-3.56
Left Socialists	926	3.93	-0.06
Progress Party	738	3.13	-6.09
Christian People's Party	431	1.83	+0.60
Justice Party of Denmark	313	1.33	-0.16
Communist Party of Denmark	128	0.54	-0.23
Socialist Workers Party	7	0.03	-0.01
Marxist–Leninists Party	2	0.01	New
Carsten Grøn-Nielsen	2	0.01	New
Mogens Nebelong	1	0.00	-0.01
Poul Rasmussen	0	0.00	New
Total	23,575		

1981 Danish general election

Parties	Vote		
Parties	Votes	%	+ / -
Conservatives	7,475	33.60	+2.86
Social Democrats	3,963	17.82	-5.09
Centre Democrats	2,253	10.13	+5.53
Green Left	2,054	9.23	+4.93
Progress Party	2,051	9.22	-1.03
Social Liberals	1,449	6.51	-1.09
Venstre	1,304	5.86	-3.72
Left Socialists	887	3.99	-0.87
Justice Party of Denmark	331	1.49	-1.00
Christian People's Party	274	1.23	-0.15
Communist Party of Denmark	171	0.77	-0.27
Communist Workers Party	20	0.09	-0.17
Socialist Workers Party	9	0.04	New
Mogens Nebelong	3	0.01	New
Total	22,244		

=== General elections in the 1970s ===
1979 Danish general election

Parties	Vote		
Parties	Votes	%	+ / -
Conservatives	7,112	30.74	+6.77
Social Democrats	5,299	22.91	-1.54
Progress Party	2,371	10.25	-4.79
Venstre	2,216	9.58	+1.98
Social Liberals	1,757	7.60	+3.38
Left Socialists	1,124	4.86	+1.37
Centre Democrats	1,064	4.60	-5.39
Green Left	994	4.30	+1.11
Justice Party of Denmark	576	2.49	-0.94
Christian People's Party	319	1.38	-0.80
Communist Party of Denmark	241	1.04	-0.78
Communist Workers Party	60	0.26	New
Total	23,133		

1977 Danish general election

Parties	Vote		
Parties	Votes	%	+ / -
Social Democrats	5,710	24.45	+7.81
Conservatives	5,598	23.97	+8.90
Progress Party	3,513	15.04	-0.13
Centre Democrats	2,333	9.99	+7.08
Venstre	1,776	7.60	-19.73
Social Liberals	986	4.22	-3.35
Left Socialists	816	3.49	+0.57
Justice Party of Denmark	800	3.43	+1.61
Green Left	745	3.19	-1.06
Christian People's Party	509	2.18	-1.75
Communist Party of Denmark	426	1.82	-0.57
Pensioners' Party	144	0.62	New
Poul Rasmussen	1	0.00	New
Otto Jensen	0	0.00	New
Total	23,357		

1975 Danish general election

Parties	Vote		
Parties	Votes	%	+ / -
Venstre	6,537	27.33	+14.93
Social Democrats	3,980	16.64	+2.96
Progress Party	3,630	15.17	-2.76
Conservatives	3,605	15.07	-5.88
Social Liberals	1,810	7.57	-3.80
Green Left	1,017	4.25	-1.22
Christian People's Party	940	3.93	+1.17
Left Socialists	698	2.92	+0.88
Centre Democrats	695	2.91	-4.98
Communist Party of Denmark	572	2.39	-0.46
Justice Party of Denmark	435	1.82	-0.82
J. G. Amdrejcak	1	0.00	New
Kai Clemmensen	1	0.00	New
Henning Glahn	1	0.00	New
Poul Friborg	0	0.00	New
Total	23,922		

1973 Danish general election

Parties	Vote		
Parties	Votes	%	+ / -
Conservatives	5,204	20.95	-21.05
Progress Party	4,454	17.93	New
Social Democrats	3,400	13.68	-5.13
Venstre	3,082	12.40	+2.92
Social Liberals	2,826	11.37	-4.09
Centre Democrats	1,961	7.89	New
Green Left	1,360	5.47	-2.32
Communist Party of Denmark	707	2.85	+1.83
Christian People's Party	685	2.76	+1.65
Justice Party of Denmark	657	2.64	+0.89
Left Socialists	507	2.04	-0.26
Erik Dissing	2	0.01	New
Total	24,845		

1971 Danish general election

Parties	Vote		
Parties	Votes	%	+ / -
Conservatives	10,332	42.00	-8.06
Social Democrats	4,626	18.81	+1.38
Social Liberals	3,803	15.46	-0.43
Venstre	2,331	9.48	+2.97
Green Left	1,915	7.79	+3.97
Left Socialists	566	2.30	0.00
Justice Party of Denmark	430	1.75	+1.32
Christian People's Party	274	1.11	New
Communist Party of Denmark	250	1.02	+0.31
Henning Berthelsen	71	0.29	New
Total	24,598		

=== General elections in the 1960s ===
1968 Danish general election

Parties	Vote		
Parties	Votes	%	+ / -
Conservatives	13,507	50.06	+3.81
Social Democrats	4,702	17.43	-2.44
Social Liberals	4,288	15.89	+7.95
Venstre	1,756	6.51	-2.70
Green Left	1,030	3.82	-4.78
Liberal Centre	636	2.36	-2.27
Left Socialists	620	2.30	New
Communist Party of Denmark	191	0.71	+0.06
Independent Party	139	0.52	-1.90
Justice Party of Denmark	115	0.43	0.00
H. Søndersted Andersen	2	0.01	New
Kirsten Lonning	2	0.01	New
Thode Karlsen	0	0.00	-0.01
Total	26,984		

1966 Danish general election

Parties	Vote		
Parties	Votes	%	+ / -
Conservatives	12,464	46.25	-2.74
Social Democrats	5,356	19.87	-3.98
Venstre	2,482	9.21	-2.45
Green Left	2,318	8.60	+4.39
Social Liberals	2,141	7.94	+3.38
Liberal Centre	1,247	4.63	New
Independent Party	651	2.42	-1.44
Communist Party of Denmark	174	0.65	-0.28
Justice Party of Denmark	117	0.43	-0.33
Thode Karlsen	2	0.01	New
Total	26,952		

1964 Danish general election

Parties	Vote		
Parties	Votes	%	+ / -
Conservatives	12,905	48.99	+1.07
Social Democrats	6,284	23.85	-1.78
Venstre	3,073	11.66	+2.29
Social Liberals	1,201	4.56	-0.32
Green Left	1,110	4.21	-0.46
Independent Party	1,018	3.86	-1.41
Communist Party of Denmark	246	0.93	+0.13
Justice Party of Denmark	199	0.76	-0.70
Danish Unity	188	0.71	New
Peace Politics People's Party	115	0.44	New
Elin Høgsbro Appel	5	0.02	New
Total	26,344		

1960 Danish general election

Parties	Vote		
Parties	Votes	%	+ / -
Conservatives	11,810	47.92	+2.65
Social Democrats	6,318	25.63	+1.87
Venstre	2,310	9.37	-5.34
Independent Party	1,299	5.27	+2.88
Social Liberals	1,203	4.88	-1.90
Green Left	1,151	4.67	New
Justice Party of Denmark	360	1.46	-3.54
Communist Party of Denmark	196	0.80	-1.28
Total	24,647		

=== General elections in the 1950s ===
1957 Danish general election

Parties	Vote		
Parties	Votes	%	+ / -
Conservatives	10,746	45.27	-1.53
Social Democrats	5,641	23.76	-0.78
Venstre	3,491	14.71	+3.47
Social Liberals	1,610	6.78	-0.11
Justice Party of Denmark	1,188	5.00	+1.27
Independent Party	567	2.39	-0.99
Communist Party of Denmark	494	2.08	-1.34
Total	23,737		

September 1953 Danish Folketing election

Parties	Vote		
Parties	Votes	%	+ / -
Conservatives	10,168	46.80	-1.32
Social Democrats	5,331	24.54	-0.30
Venstre	2,443	11.24	+3.50
Social Liberals	1,496	6.89	-1.04
Justice Party of Denmark	811	3.73	-2.72
Communist Party of Denmark	743	3.42	-0.18
Independent Party	735	3.38	New
Total	21,727		

April 1953 Danish Folketing election

Parties	Vote		
Parties	Votes	%	+ / -
Conservatives	10,038	48.12	+1.81
Social Democrats	5,182	24.84	-1.35
Social Liberals	1,654	7.93	+0.44
Venstre	1,615	7.74	+2.37
Justice Party of Denmark	1,345	6.45	-4.44
Communist Party of Denmark	751	3.60	-0.14
Danish Unity	277	1.33	New
Total	20,862		

1950 Danish Folketing election

Parties	Vote		
Parties	Votes	%	+ / -
Conservatives	9,246	46.31	+13.57
Social Democrats	5,230	26.19	+4.46
Justice Party of Denmark	2,175	10.89	+3.41
Social Liberals	1,496	7.49	+0.42
Venstre	1,072	5.37	+5.37
Communist Party of Denmark	747	3.74	-0.60
Total	19,966		

=== General elections in the 1940s ===
1947 Danish Folketing election

Parties	Vote		
Parties	Votes	%	+ / -
Conservatives	14,923	32.74	-17.04
Venstre	10,973	24.08	+15.80
Social Democrats	9,906	21.73	+4.97
Justice Party of Denmark	3,411	7.48	+5.43
Social Liberals	3,221	7.07	+0.94
Communist Party of Denmark	1,979	4.34	-4.74
Danish Unity	1,165	2.56	-5.33
Total	45,578		

1945 Danish Folketing election

Parties	Vote		
Parties	Votes	%	+ / -
Conservatives	22,553	49.78	-4.99
Social Democrats	7,594	16.76	-8.82
Communist Party of Denmark	4,113	9.08	New
Venstre	3,753	8.28	+6.05
Danish Unity	3,576	7.89	+1.57
Social Liberals	2,776	6.13	-0.33
Justice Party of Denmark	931	2.05	+0.23
Edward Hjalmar Larsen	13	0.03	New
Total	45,309		

1943 Danish Folketing election

Parties	Vote		
Parties	Votes	%	+ / -
Conservatives	24,560	54.77	+1.34
Social Democrats	11,472	25.58	-1.14
Social Liberals	2,896	6.46	-2.53
Danish Unity	2,833	6.32	+5.10
National Socialist Workers' Party of Denmark	1,264	2.82	+1.21
Venstre	1,001	2.23	+0.13
Justice Party of Denmark	816	1.82	-0.20
Chr. Orla Nielsen	4	0.01	New
Total	44,846		

=== General elections in the 1930s ===
1939 Danish Folketing election

Parties	Vote		
Parties	Votes	%	+ / -
Conservatives	18,579	53.43	+2.09
Social Democrats	9,290	26.72	-6.67
Social Liberals	3,126	8.99	-0.13
National Cooperation	964	2.77	New
Venstre	731	2.10	+0.82
Justice Party of Denmark	704	2.02	-0.94
National Socialist Workers' Party of Denmark	560	1.61	+0.67
Danish Unity	425	1.22	New
Communist Party of Denmark	369	1.06	+0.17
Farmers' Party	24	0.07	-0.01
Total	34,772		

1935 Danish Folketing election

Parties	Vote		
Parties	Votes	%	+ / -
Conservatives	14,619	51.34	+1.36
Social Democrats	9,508	33.39	+0.32
Social Liberals	2,596	9.12	+1.30
Justice Party of Denmark	844	2.96	-1.26
Venstre	365	1.28	-2.78
National Socialist Workers' Party of Denmark	269	0.94	New
Communist Party of Denmark	253	0.89	+0.10
Independent People's Party	23	0.08	New
Total	28,477		

1932 Danish Folketing election

Parties	Vote		
Parties	Votes	%	+ / -
Conservatives	11,247	49.98	+0.99
Social Democrats	7,441	33.07	+2.24
Social Liberals	1,760	7.82	-1.15
Justice Party of Denmark	949	4.22	+1.10
Venstre	914	4.06	-3.90
Communist Party of Denmark	177	0.79	+0.66
W. Colding	14	0.06	New
Christian Sørensen	2	0.01	New
Total	22,504		

=== General elections in the 1920s ===
1929 Danish Folketing election

Parties	Vote		
Parties	Votes	%	+ / -
Conservatives	8,811	48.99	-8.74
Social Democrats	5,545	30.83	+3.89
Social Liberals	1,614	8.97	+0.20
Venstre	1,431	7.96	+2.94
Justice Party of Denmark	561	3.12	+1.73
Communist Party of Denmark	24	0.13	-0.01
Total	17,986		

1926 Danish Folketing election

Parties	Vote		
Parties	Votes	%	+ / -
Conservatives	9,450	57.73	+2.04
Social Democrats	4,410	26.94	-0.87
Social Liberals	1,436	8.77	-1.35
Venstre	822	5.02	+0.64
Justice Party of Denmark	227	1.39	-0.26
Communist Party of Denmark	23	0.14	-0.17
Total	16,368		

1924 Danish Folketing election

Parties	Vote		
Parties	Votes	%	+ / -
Conservatives	8,354	55.69	+1.43
Social Democrats	4,172	27.81	+3.36
Social Liberals	1,518	10.12	+1.63
Venstre	657	4.38	-2.98
Justice Party of Denmark	247	1.65	New
Communist Party of Denmark	46	0.31	New
Farmer Party	6	0.04	New
Total	15,000		

September 1920 Danish Folketing election

Parties	Vote		
Parties	Votes	%	+ / -
Conservatives	7,093	54.26	-2.90
Social Democrats	3,197	24.45	+3.24
Social Liberals	1,110	8.49	+1.68
Venstre	962	7.36	-0.28
Industry Party	697	5.33	-1.78
Danish Left Socialist Party	14	0.11	New
Total	13,073		

July 1920 Danish Folketing election

Parties	Vote		
Parties	Votes	%	+ / -
Conservatives	6,221	57.16	+1.58
Social Democrats	2,308	21.21	+1.89
Venstre	831	7.64	+1.25
Industry Party	774	7.11	+0.70
Social Liberals	741	6.81	-2.08
A. Sterregaard	8	0.07	New
Total	10,883		

April 1920 Danish Folketing election

Parties	Vote	
Parties	Votes	%
Conservatives	6,971	55.58
Social Democrats	2,423	19.32
Social Liberals	1,115	8.89
Industry Party	804	6.41
Venstre	802	6.39
Centrum	414	3.30
Daniel Nielsen	14	0.11
Total	12,543	

== European Parliament elections results ==
2024 European Parliament election in Denmark

Parties	Vote		
Parties	Votes	%	+ / -
Conservatives	6,209	16.94	-0.62
Venstre	6,146	16.77	-9.84
Green Left	5,154	14.06	+2.69
Liberal Alliance	4,442	12.12	+8.69
Social Liberals	4,017	10.96	-5.46
Social Democrats	3,259	8.89	-1.70
Moderates	3,086	8.42	New
Red–Green Alliance	1,734	4.73	+1.37
Danish People's Party	1,314	3.58	-1.90
The Alternative	771	2.10	-1.03
Denmark Democrats	525	1.43	New
Total	36,657		

2019 European Parliament election in Denmark

Parties	Vote		
Parties	Votes	%	+ / -
Venstre	10,390	26.61	+7.18
Conservatives	6,856	17.56	-0.37
Social Liberals	6,410	16.42	+4.11
Green Left	4,439	11.37	+1.64
Social Democrats	4,133	10.59	-2.60
Danish People's Party	2,138	5.48	-10.87
Liberal Alliance	1,340	3.43	-2.59
Red–Green Alliance	1,311	3.36	New
The Alternative	1,222	3.13	New
People's Movement against the EU	801	2.05	-2.99
Total	39,040		

2014 European Parliament election in Denmark

Parties	Vote		
Parties	Votes	%	+ / -
Venstre	6,502	19.43	-6.23
Conservatives	5,998	17.93	-2.68
Danish People's Party	5,470	16.35	+5.42
Social Democrats	4,415	13.19	+0.02
Social Liberals	4,119	12.31	+4.21
Green Left	3,257	9.73	-3.23
Liberal Alliance	2,015	6.02	+4.91
People's Movement against the EU	1,685	5.04	-0.50
Total	33,461		

2009 European Parliament election in Denmark

Parties	Vote		
Parties	Votes	%	+ / -
Venstre	8,602	25.66	+6.05
Conservatives	6,910	20.61	-3.50
Social Democrats	4,415	13.17	-7.09
Green Left	4,344	12.96	+5.28
Danish People's Party	3,666	10.93	+5.06
Social Liberals	2,715	8.10	-2.79
People's Movement against the EU	1,858	5.54	+0.86
June Movement	643	1.92	-4.42
Liberal Alliance	373	1.11	New
Total	33,526		

2004 European Parliament election in Denmark

Parties	Vote		
Parties	Votes	%	+ / -
Conservatives	3,424	24.11	+6.80
Social Democrats	2,877	20.26	+11.80
Venstre	2,785	19.61	-8.15
Social Liberals	1,547	10.89	-0.44
Green Left	1,090	7.68	+1.26
June Movement	901	6.34	-5.24
Danish People's Party	834	5.87	+0.65
People's Movement against the EU	665	4.68	-1.50
Christian Democrats	78	0.55	-0.79
Total	14,201		

1999 European Parliament election in Denmark

Parties	Vote		
Parties	Votes	%	+ / -
Venstre	4,112	27.76	+11.97
Conservatives	2,564	17.31	-18.11
June Movement	1,715	11.58	-0.09
Social Liberals	1,678	11.33	+1.52
Social Democrats	1,253	8.46	+1.72
Green Left	951	6.42	-1.76
People's Movement against the EU	916	6.18	-2.10
Danish People's Party	773	5.22	New
Centre Democrats	651	4.40	+2.94
Christian Democrats	198	1.34	+0.76
Progress Party	56	0.38	-1.70
Total	14,811		

1994 European Parliament election in Denmark

Parties	Vote		
Parties	Votes	%	+ / -
Conservatives	5,631	35.42	+8.24
Venstre	2,510	15.79	+0.75
June Movement	1,855	11.67	New
Social Liberals	1,559	9.81	+6.09
People's Movement against the EU	1,317	8.28	-7.81
Green Left	1,300	8.18	+0.82
Social Democrats	1,071	6.74	-4.26
Progress Party	330	2.08	-1.72
Centre Democrats	232	1.46	-12.51
Christian Democrats	92	0.58	-1.27
Total	15,897		

1989 European Parliament election in Denmark

Parties	Vote		
Parties	Votes	%	+ / -
Conservatives	3,835	27.18	-13.05
People's Movement against the EU	2,271	16.09	-3.05
Venstre	2,123	15.04	+9.89
Centre Democrats	1,971	13.97	+4.11
Social Democrats	1,552	11.00	+2.09
Green Left	1,038	7.36	+0.81
Progress Party	536	3.80	+0.17
Social Liberals	525	3.72	+0.20
Christian Democrats	261	1.85	+0.21
Total	14,112		

1984 European Parliament election in Denmark

Parties	Vote	
Parties	Votes	%
Conservatives	6,346	40.23
People's Movement against the EU	3,020	19.14
Centre Democrats	1,555	9.86
Social Democrats	1,406	8.91
Green Left	1,034	6.55
Venstre	812	5.15
Progress Party	573	3.63
Social Liberals	555	3.52
Christian Democrats	259	1.64
Left Socialists	216	1.37
Total	15,776	

== Referendums ==
2022 Danish European Union opt-out referendum

Option	Votes	%
✓ YES	29,382	80.17
X NO	7,268	19.83

2015 Danish European Union opt-out referendum

Option	Votes	%
✓ YES	25,149	65.90
X NO	13,016	34.10

2014 Danish Unified Patent Court membership referendum

Option	Votes	%
✓ YES	24,414	75.29
X NO	8,014	24.71

2009 Danish Act of Succession referendum

Option	Votes	%
✓ YES	25,644	86.40
X NO	4,038	13.60

2000 Danish euro referendum

Option	Votes	%
✓ YES	13,812	62.25
X NO	8,377	37.75

1998 Danish Amsterdam Treaty referendum

Option	Votes	%
✓ YES	13,666	68.14
X NO	6,391	31.86

1993 Danish Maastricht Treaty referendum

Option	Votes	%
✓ YES	15,633	68.78
X NO	7,096	31.22

1992 Danish Maastricht Treaty referendum

Option	Votes	%
✓ YES	14,125	63.97
X NO	7,954	36.03

1986 Danish Single European Act referendum

Option	Votes	%
✓ YES	14,146	69.42
X NO	6,231	30.58

1972 Danish European Communities membership referendum

Option	Votes	%
✓ YES	18,580	71.28
X NO	7,487	28.72

1953 Danish constitutional and electoral age referendum

Option	Votes	%
✓ YES	9,742	64.99
X NO	5,249	35.01
23 years	9,820	65.45
21 years	5,183	34.55

1939 Danish constitutional referendum

Option	Votes	%
✓ YES	19,816	86.90
X NO	2,987	13.10
