= Nyborg (nomination district) =

- Nyborg
- Nomination district constituency for the Folketing
- Location of Nyborg within Funen

- Location of Funen within Denmark
- Municipalities: Kerteminde; Nyborg
- Constituency: Funen
- Electorate: 42,780 (2022)

Current constituency
- Created: 1849 (as constituency); 1920 (as nomination district)

Nyborg nominating district is one of the 92 nominating districts that exists for Danish elections following the 2007 municipal reform. It consists of Kertminde and Nyborg municipality. It was created in 1849 as a constituency, and has been a nomination district since 1920, though its boundaries have been changed since then.

In general elections, the district tends to vote close to the national result when looking at the split vote between the two blocs.

== General elections results ==
=== General elections in the 2020s ===
2022 Danish general election

Parties	Vote		
Parties	Votes	%	+ / -
Social Democrats	12,806	36.08	+1.24
Venstre	4,185	11.79	-11.73
Denmark Democrats	3,427	9.65	New
Moderates	3,259	9.18	New
Green Left	2,555	7.20	+1.67
Liberal Alliance	1,993	5.61	+4.15
Conservatives	1,860	5.24	-1.25
New Right	1,549	4.36	+2.21
Red–Green Alliance	1,204	3.39	-1.99
Danish People's Party	1,033	2.91	-7.08
Social Liberals	711	2.00	-2.82
The Alternative	608	1.71	-0.28
Independent Greens	162	0.46	New
Christian Democrats	116	0.33	-0.62
Millah Kongsbach	30	0.08	New
Total	35,498		

=== General elections in the 2010s ===
2019 Danish general election

Parties	Vote		
Parties	Votes	%	+ / -
Social Democrats	12,386	34.84	+1.45
Venstre	8,361	23.52	+4.99
Danish People's Party	3,551	9.99	-13.86
Conservatives	2,307	6.49	+3.61
Green Left	1,967	5.53	+1.55
Red–Green Alliance	1,911	5.38	-1.28
Social Liberals	1,713	4.82	+2.72
New Right	764	2.15	New
Stram Kurs	743	2.09	New
The Alternative	706	1.99	-1.06
Liberal Alliance	518	1.46	-3.73
Christian Democrats	339	0.95	+0.59
Klaus Riskær Pedersen Party	280	0.79	New
Total	35,546		

2015 Danish general election

Parties	Vote		
Parties	Votes	%	+ / -
Social Democrats	12,051	33.39	+2.33
Danish People's Party	8,607	23.85	+10.30
Venstre	6,687	18.53	-6.08
Red–Green Alliance	2,405	6.66	+1.56
Liberal Alliance	1,872	5.19	+1.30
Green Left	1,435	3.98	-6.38
The Alternative	1,102	3.05	New
Conservatives	1,041	2.88	-1.35
Social Liberals	759	2.10	-4.61
Christian Democrats	129	0.36	+0.02
Total	36,088		

2011 Danish general election

Parties	Vote		
Parties	Votes	%	+ / -
Social Democrats	11,388	31.06	+2.70
Venstre	9,020	24.61	+1.22
Danish People's Party	4,968	13.55	-2.34
Green Left	3,799	10.36	-2.90
Social Liberals	2,458	6.71	+2.78
Red–Green Alliance	1,871	5.10	+3.90
Conservatives	1,551	4.23	-7.43
Liberal Alliance	1,426	3.89	+1.91
Christian Democrats	125	0.34	+0.04
Lars Grønbæk Larsen	47	0.13	New
Michael Ellegård	6	0.02	-0.02
Total	36,659		

=== General elections in the 2000s ===
2007 Danish general election

Parties	Vote		
Parties	Votes	%	+ / -
Social Democrats	10,186	28.36	+0.50
Venstre	8,400	23.39	-3.49
Danish People's Party	5,709	15.89	+2.16
Green Left	4,761	13.26	+7.21
Conservatives	4,188	11.66	-0.16
Social Liberals	1,411	3.93	-4.24
New Alliance	711	1.98	New
Red–Green Alliance	432	1.20	-2.04
Christian Democrats	107	0.30	-0.65
Michael Ellegård	13	0.04	New
Total	35,918		

2005 Danish general election

Parties	Vote		
Parties	Votes	%	+ / -
Social Democrats	8,386	27.86	-1.70
Venstre	8,089	26.88	-3.37
Danish People's Party	4,131	13.73	+1.46
Conservatives	3,559	11.82	+0.74
Social Liberals	2,458	8.17	+3.92
Green Left	1,821	6.05	-0.87
Red–Green Alliance	975	3.24	+0.96
Centre Democrats	299	0.99	-0.31
Christian Democrats	285	0.95	-0.44
Minority Party	95	0.32	New
Total	30,098		

2001 Danish general election

Parties	Vote		
Parties	Votes	%	+ / -
Venstre	9,320	30.25	+5.10
Social Democrats	9,107	29.56	-8.99
Danish People's Party	3,781	12.27	+4.78
Conservatives	3,413	11.08	+3.80
Green Left	2,131	6.92	-0.72
Social Liberals	1,310	4.25	+0.20
Red–Green Alliance	704	2.28	+0.05
Christian People's Party	427	1.39	-0.21
Centre Democrats	400	1.30	-2.55
Progress Party	217	0.70	-1.06
Total	30,810		

=== General elections in the 1990s ===
1998 Danish general election

Parties	Vote		
Parties	Votes	%	+ / -
Social Democrats	11,892	38.55	-0.85
Venstre	7,760	25.15	-0.21
Green Left	2,356	7.64	+1.02
Danish People's Party	2,312	7.49	New
Conservatives	2,246	7.28	-3.58
Social Liberals	1,248	4.05	-0.63
Centre Democrats	1,188	3.85	+1.85
Red–Green Alliance	687	2.23	-0.53
Progress Party	542	1.76	-5.42
Christian People's Party	495	1.60	+0.55
Democratic Renewal	110	0.36	New
Svend Jensen	13	0.04	New
Total	30,849		

1994 Danish general election

Parties	Vote		
Parties	Votes	%	+ / -
Social Democrats	11,687	39.40	0.00
Venstre	7,523	25.36	+5.71
Conservatives	3,221	10.86	-1.09
Progress Party	2,131	7.18	-0.45
Green Left	1,963	6.62	-1.28
Social Liberals	1,387	4.68	+1.10
Red–Green Alliance	818	2.76	+1.36
Centre Democrats	592	2.00	-1.70
Christian People's Party	311	1.05	-0.22
Michael Ellegård	15	0.05	New
Else Lundgaard	9	0.03	New
Leif Nybo	7	0.02	New
Bjørn Henriksen	0	0.00	New
Total	29,664		

1990 Danish general election

Parties	Vote		
Parties	Votes	%	+ / -
Social Democrats	11,682	39.40	+10.01
Venstre	5,827	19.65	+3.87
Conservatives	3,543	11.95	-3.94
Green Left	2,343	7.90	-5.23
Progress Party	2,264	7.63	-3.16
Centre Democrats	1,098	3.70	+0.26
Social Liberals	1,061	3.58	-1.76
Common Course	452	1.52	-0.72
Red–Green Alliance	415	1.40	New
Christian People's Party	377	1.27	+0.12
The Greens	343	1.16	-0.50
Justice Party of Denmark	232	0.78	New
Humanist Party	9	0.03	New
Mogens Trondhjem	7	0.02	New
Tage Abildgart	0	0.00	New
Total	29,653		

=== General elections in the 1980s ===
1988 Danish general election

Parties	Vote		
Parties	Votes	%	+ / -
Social Democrats	8,899	29.39	-0.34
Conservatives	4,811	15.89	-3.00
Venstre	4,778	15.78	+1.66
Green Left	3,976	13.13	-0.62
Progress Party	3,267	10.79	+5.28
Social Liberals	1,618	5.34	-0.99
Centre Democrats	1,043	3.44	+0.02
Common Course	679	2.24	-0.30
The Greens	502	1.66	+0.02
Christian People's Party	347	1.15	-0.34
Left Socialists	183	0.60	-0.55
Communist Party of Denmark	170	0.56	+0.01
Carl Erik Jørgensen	11	0.04	New
Total	30,284		

1987 Danish general election

Parties	Vote		
Parties	Votes	%	+ / -
Social Democrats	9,078	29.73	-0.97
Conservatives	5,767	18.89	-2.59
Venstre	4,313	14.12	-2.47
Green Left	4,198	13.75	+2.84
Social Liberals	1,933	6.33	+0.16
Progress Party	1,682	5.51	+1.94
Centre Democrats	1,043	3.42	-1.06
Common Course	776	2.54	New
The Greens	501	1.64	New
Christian People's Party	456	1.49	-0.15
Left Socialists	350	1.15	-0.98
Justice Party of Denmark	180	0.59	-1.15
Communist Party of Denmark	168	0.55	+0.10
Humanist Party	46	0.15	New
Socialist Workers Party	30	0.10	+0.05
Marxist–Leninists Party	9	0.03	-0.01
Henrik Nørregård Nielsen	5	0.02	New
Total	30,535		

1984 Danish general election

Parties	Vote		
Parties	Votes	%	+ / -
Social Democrats	9,462	30.70	-1.15
Conservatives	6,622	21.48	+9.41
Venstre	5,113	16.59	-0.06
Green Left	3,363	10.91	+0.47
Social Liberals	1,902	6.17	+0.19
Centre Democrats	1,381	4.48	-3.77
Progress Party	1,100	3.57	-5.83
Left Socialists	658	2.13	+0.32
Justice Party of Denmark	537	1.74	+0.23
Christian People's Party	507	1.64	+0.41
Communist Party of Denmark	140	0.45	-0.18
Socialist Workers Party	14	0.05	-0.03
Marxist–Leninists Party	13	0.04	New
Carl Erik Jørgensen	11	0.04	New
Total	30,823		

1981 Danish general election

Parties	Vote		
Parties	Votes	%	+ / -
Social Democrats	9,194	31.85	-4.35
Venstre	4,806	16.65	-0.74
Conservatives	3,486	12.07	+1.88
Green Left	3,014	10.44	+4.24
Progress Party	2,713	9.40	-3.43
Centre Democrats	2,381	8.25	+5.02
Social Liberals	1,726	5.98	+0.39
Left Socialists	524	1.81	-0.88
Justice Party of Denmark	435	1.51	-1.28
Christian People's Party	354	1.23	-0.20
Communist Party of Denmark	183	0.63	-0.59
Communist Workers Party	26	0.09	-0.16
Socialist Workers Party	22	0.08	New
Anders Bondo Christensen	7	0.02	New
Total	28,871		

=== General elections in the 1970s ===
1979 Danish general election

Parties	Vote		
Parties	Votes	%	+ / -
Social Democrats	10,656	36.20	+1.35
Venstre	5,119	17.39	+0.12
Progress Party	3,777	12.83	-2.58
Conservatives	2,999	10.19	+2.50
Green Left	1,824	6.20	+2.49
Social Liberals	1,646	5.59	+1.00
Centre Democrats	951	3.23	-2.20
Justice Party of Denmark	821	2.79	-0.60
Left Socialists	792	2.69	+0.59
Christian People's Party	420	1.43	-0.96
Communist Party of Denmark	360	1.22	-1.22
Communist Workers Party	75	0.25	New
Total	29,440		

1977 Danish general election

Parties	Vote		
Parties	Votes	%	+ / -
Social Democrats	9,956	34.85	+5.85
Venstre	4,935	17.27	-11.42
Progress Party	4,402	15.41	+2.96
Conservatives	2,197	7.69	+2.65
Centre Democrats	1,551	5.43	+3.83
Social Liberals	1,311	4.59	-4.18
Green Left	1,061	3.71	-0.18
Justice Party of Denmark	969	3.39	+1.40
Communist Party of Denmark	698	2.44	-0.46
Christian People's Party	683	2.39	-1.50
Left Socialists	599	2.10	+0.39
Pensioners' Party	210	0.73	New
Total	28,572		

1975 Danish general election

Parties	Vote		
Parties	Votes	%	+ / -
Social Democrats	8,102	29.00	+4.23
Venstre	8,014	28.69	+12.40
Progress Party	3,478	12.45	-2.31
Social Liberals	2,451	8.77	-8.07
Conservatives	1,409	5.04	-3.36
Green Left	1,088	3.89	-0.05
Christian People's Party	1,086	3.89	+1.24
Communist Party of Denmark	809	2.90	+0.60
Justice Party of Denmark	555	1.99	-0.89
Left Socialists	479	1.71	+0.51
Centre Democrats	446	1.60	-4.37
Gunner Pedersen	17	0.06	New
Oscar Andersen	2	0.01	New
Ivan Folmer-Larsen	1	0.00	New
E. Just Jensen	0	0.00	New
Hans Clausen Pilegaard	0	0.00	New
Total	27,937		

1973 Danish general election

Parties	Vote		
Parties	Votes	%	+ / -
Social Democrats	7,061	24.77	-12.27
Social Liberals	4,802	16.84	-1.54
Venstre	4,645	16.29	-4.43
Progress Party	4,207	14.76	New
Conservatives	2,396	8.40	-4.11
Centre Democrats	1,702	5.97	New
Green Left	1,122	3.94	-2.05
Justice Party of Denmark	822	2.88	+0.88
Christian People's Party	755	2.65	+1.49
Communist Party of Denmark	657	2.30	+1.18
Left Socialists	342	1.20	+0.12
Total	28,511		

1971 Danish general election

Parties	Vote		
Parties	Votes	%	+ / -
Social Democrats	9,701	37.04	-1.42
Venstre	5,425	20.72	-0.14
Social Liberals	4,813	18.38	+2.79
Conservatives	3,275	12.51	-3.79
Green Left	1,569	5.99	+1.10
Justice Party of Denmark	525	2.00	+1.28
Christian People's Party	305	1.16	New
Communist Party of Denmark	293	1.12	+0.39
Left Socialists	282	1.08	+0.11
Total	26,188		

=== General elections in the 1960s ===
1968 Danish general election

Parties	Vote		
Parties	Votes	%	+ / -
Social Democrats	6,303	38.46	-3.58
Venstre	3,419	20.86	-1.52
Conservatives	2,672	16.30	+1.42
Social Liberals	2,556	15.59	+6.52
Green Left	801	4.89	-2.83
Left Socialists	159	0.97	New
Liberal Centre	150	0.92	-0.66
Communist Party of Denmark	119	0.73	+0.20
Justice Party of Denmark	118	0.72	+0.09
Independent Party	93	0.57	-0.60
Total	16,390		

1966 Danish general election

Parties	Vote		
Parties	Votes	%	+ / -
Social Democrats	6,691	42.04	-3.19
Venstre	3,562	22.38	-1.96
Conservatives	2,368	14.88	+0.28
Social Liberals	1,444	9.07	+1.82
Green Left	1,229	7.72	+3.52
Liberal Centre	252	1.58	New
Independent Party	187	1.17	-0.74
Justice Party of Denmark	100	0.63	-0.49
Communist Party of Denmark	84	0.53	-0.23
Total	15,917		

1964 Danish general election

Parties	Vote		
Parties	Votes	%	+ / -
Social Democrats	6,991	45.23	+1.67
Venstre	3,762	24.34	-2.95
Conservatives	2,257	14.60	+2.78
Social Liberals	1,121	7.25	-1.16
Green Left	649	4.20	-0.35
Independent Party	295	1.91	-0.08
Justice Party of Denmark	173	1.12	-0.63
Communist Party of Denmark	118	0.76	+0.12
Peace Politics People's Party	56	0.36	New
Danish Unity	36	0.23	New
Total	15,458		

1960 Danish general election

Parties	Vote		
Parties	Votes	%	+ / -
Social Democrats	6,342	43.56	+1.40
Venstre	3,973	27.29	-4.55
Conservatives	1,721	11.82	+2.51
Social Liberals	1,224	8.41	-2.39
Green Left	662	4.55	New
Independent Party	290	1.99	+0.95
Justice Party of Denmark	255	1.75	-1.57
Communist Party of Denmark	93	0.64	-0.88
Total	14,560		

=== General elections in the 1950s ===
1957 Danish general election

Parties	Vote		
Parties	Votes	%	+ / -
Social Democrats	6,040	42.16	-1.76
Venstre	4,562	31.84	+2.47
Social Liberals	1,547	10.80	+0.12
Conservatives	1,334	9.31	+0.18
Justice Party of Denmark	476	3.32	+0.52
Communist Party of Denmark	218	1.52	-0.94
Independent Party	149	1.04	-0.58
Total	14,326		

September 1953 Danish Folketing election

Parties	Vote		
Parties	Votes	%	+ / -
Social Democrats	6,113	43.92	+1.40
Venstre	4,088	29.37	+0.80
Social Liberals	1,487	10.68	-0.58
Conservatives	1,271	9.13	-1.03
Justice Party of Denmark	390	2.80	-1.68
Communist Party of Denmark	342	2.46	-0.25
Independent Party	226	1.62	New
Total	13,917		

April 1953 Danish Folketing election

Parties	Vote		
Parties	Votes	%	+ / -
Social Democrats	5,701	42.52	+0.62
Venstre	3,831	28.57	+1.56
Social Liberals	1,509	11.26	-0.05
Conservatives	1,362	10.16	-0.73
Justice Party of Denmark	601	4.48	-2.11
Communist Party of Denmark	363	2.71	+0.41
Danish Unity	40	0.30	New
Total	13,407		

1950 Danish Folketing election

Parties	Vote		
Parties	Votes	%	+ / -
Social Democrats	5,581	41.90	+0.28
Venstre	3,598	27.01	-5.81
Social Liberals	1,506	11.31	+1.40
Conservatives	1,451	10.89	+2.73
Justice Party of Denmark	878	6.59	+3.36
Communist Party of Denmark	307	2.30	-1.27
Total	13,321		

=== General elections in the 1940s ===
1947 Danish Folketing election

Parties	Vote		
Parties	Votes	%	+ / -
Social Democrats	5,531	41.62	+3.98
Venstre	4,362	32.82	+3.53
Social Liberals	1,317	9.91	-1.28
Conservatives	1,085	8.16	-4.11
Communist Party of Denmark	475	3.57	-3.12
Justice Party of Denmark	429	3.23	+2.11
Danish Unity	90	0.68	-1.11
Total	13,289		

1945 Danish Folketing election

Parties	Vote		
Parties	Votes	%	+ / -
Social Democrats	4,954	37.64	-5.82
Venstre	3,855	29.29	+3.54
Conservatives	1,615	12.27	-3.45
Social Liberals	1,473	11.19	+0.21
Communist Party of Denmark	880	6.69	New
Danish Unity	236	1.79	+0.68
Justice Party of Denmark	148	1.12	-0.01
Total	13,161		

1943 Danish Folketing election

Parties	Vote		
Parties	Votes	%	+ / -
Social Democrats	5,667	43.46	+2.42
Venstre	3,358	25.75	-1.20
Conservatives	2,050	15.72	+2.58
Social Liberals	1,432	10.98	-1.68
Justice Party of Denmark	148	1.13	-0.19
Danish Unity	145	1.11	+0.88
National Socialist Workers' Party of Denmark	142	1.09	+0.22
Farmers' Party	98	0.75	-0.31
Total	13,040		

=== General elections in the 1930s ===
1939 Danish Folketing election

Parties	Vote		
Parties	Votes	%	+ / -
Social Democrats	4,740	41.04	-3.52
Venstre	3,112	26.95	+0.83
Conservatives	1,517	13.14	+0.58
Social Liberals	1,462	12.66	+0.65
Communist Party of Denmark	250	2.16	+1.14
Justice Party of Denmark	153	1.32	-0.74
Farmers' Party	122	1.06	-0.45
National Socialist Workers' Party of Denmark	101	0.87	+0.71
National Cooperation	65	0.56	New
Danish Unity	27	0.23	New
Total	11,549		

1935 Danish Folketing election

Parties	Vote		
Parties	Votes	%	+ / -
Social Democrats	5,156	44.56	+1.04
Venstre	3,022	26.12	-5.64
Conservatives	1,453	12.56	+1.51
Social Liberals	1,390	12.01	+0.64
Justice Party of Denmark	238	2.06	+0.02
Independent People's Party	175	1.51	New
Communist Party of Denmark	118	1.02	+0.76
National Socialist Workers' Party of Denmark	19	0.16	New
Total	11,571		

1932 Danish Folketing election

Parties	Vote		
Parties	Votes	%	+ / -
Social Democrats	5,011	43.52	-0.63
Venstre	3,657	31.76	-0.88
Social Liberals	1,309	11.37	-1.76
Conservatives	1,272	11.05	+2.00
Justice Party of Denmark	235	2.04	+1.24
Communist Party of Denmark	30	0.26	+0.04
Total	11,514		

=== General elections in the 1920s ===
1929 Danish Folketing election

Parties	Vote		
Parties	Votes	%	+ / -
Social Democrats	4,926	44.15	+2.66
Venstre	3,642	32.64	-0.27
Social Liberals	1,465	13.13	+1.20
Conservatives	1,010	9.05	-3.31
Justice Party of Denmark	89	0.80	+0.44
Communist Party of Denmark	25	0.22	-0.74
Total	11,157		

1926 Danish Folketing election

Parties	Vote		
Parties	Votes	%	+ / -
Social Democrats	4,425	41.49	+1.17
Venstre	3,509	32.91	-0.46
Conservatives	1,318	12.36	-0.22
Social Liberals	1,272	11.93	-0.61
Communist Party of Denmark	102	0.96	+0.24
Justice Party of Denmark	38	0.36	0.00
Total	10,664		

1924 Danish Folketing election

Parties	Vote		
Parties	Votes	%	+ / -
Social Democrats	4,245	40.32	+2.73
Venstre	3,514	33.37	-4.06
Conservatives	1,325	12.58	+1.24
Social Liberals	1,320	12.54	+0.71
Communist Party of Denmark	76	0.72	New
Justice Party of Denmark	38	0.36	New
Farmer Party	11	0.10	New
Total	10,529		

September 1920 Danish Folketing election

Parties	Vote		
Parties	Votes	%	+ / -
Social Democrats	3,801	37.59	+2.26
Venstre	3,785	37.43	-4.70
Social Liberals	1,196	11.83	+1.00
Conservatives	1,147	11.34	+1.39
Industry Party	142	1.40	-0.36
Danish Left Socialist Party	41	0.41	New
Total	10,112		

July 1920 Danish Folketing election

Parties	Vote		
Parties	Votes	%	+ / -
Venstre	3,705	42.13	+3.91
Social Democrats	3,107	35.33	+0.21
Social Liberals	952	10.83	-0.89
Conservatives	875	9.95	-3.10
Industry Party	155	1.76	-0.12
Total	8,794		

April 1920 Danish Folketing election

Parties	Vote	
Parties	Votes	%
Venstre	3,411	38.22
Social Democrats	3,134	35.12
Conservatives	1,165	13.05
Social Liberals	1,046	11.72
Industry Party	168	1.88
Total	8,924	

== European Parliament elections results ==
2024 European Parliament election in Denmark

Parties	Vote		
Parties	Votes	%	+ / -
Social Democrats	5,107	21.16	-6.34
Green Left	3,990	16.53	+5.24
Venstre	3,626	15.02	-6.24
Denmark Democrats	2,170	8.99	New
Conservatives	1,960	8.12	+0.73
Danish People's Party	1,848	7.66	-4.66
Moderates	1,507	6.24	New
Liberal Alliance	1,351	5.60	+3.80
Social Liberals	1,112	4.61	-2.46
Red–Green Alliance	1,064	4.41	-0.04
The Alternative	400	1.66	-0.60
Total	24,135		

2019 European Parliament election in Denmark

Parties	Vote		
Parties	Votes	%	+ / -
Social Democrats	7,554	27.50	+5.71
Venstre	5,840	21.26	+7.86
Danish People's Party	3,383	12.32	-16.02
Green Left	3,100	11.29	+3.42
Conservatives	2,030	7.39	-8.16
Social Liberals	1,941	7.07	+3.48
People's Movement against the EU	1,282	4.67	-3.12
Red–Green Alliance	1,223	4.45	New
The Alternative	622	2.26	New
Liberal Alliance	495	1.80	+0.12
Total	27,470		

2014 European Parliament election in Denmark

Parties	Vote		
Parties	Votes	%	+ / -
Danish People's Party	6,777	28.34	+13.25
Social Democrats	5,210	21.79	-5.44
Conservatives	3,718	15.55	-0.83
Venstre	3,204	13.40	-3.35
Green Left	1,881	7.87	-5.85
People's Movement against the EU	1,862	7.79	+2.01
Social Liberals	859	3.59	+1.17
Liberal Alliance	402	1.68	+1.36
Total	23,913		

2009 European Parliament election in Denmark

Parties	Vote		
Parties	Votes	%	+ / -
Social Democrats	6,816	27.23	-5.73
Venstre	4,192	16.75	-4.13
Conservatives	4,100	16.38	+5.59
Danish People's Party	3,778	15.09	+8.23
Green Left	3,434	13.72	+5.64
People's Movement against the EU	1,448	5.78	+0.99
Social Liberals	606	2.42	-2.85
June Movement	576	2.30	-7.52
Liberal Alliance	81	0.32	New
Total	25,031		

2004 European Parliament election in Denmark

Parties	Vote		
Parties	Votes	%	+ / -
Social Democrats	5,482	32.96	+12.16
Venstre	3,473	20.88	-3.02
Conservatives	1,794	10.79	+3.17
June Movement	1,633	9.82	-6.93
Green Left	1,343	8.08	+1.55
Danish People's Party	1,140	6.86	+1.09
Social Liberals	877	5.27	-2.81
People's Movement against the EU	796	4.79	-1.86
Christian Democrats	92	0.55	-0.55
Total	16,630		

1999 European Parliament election in Denmark

Parties	Vote		
Parties	Votes	%	+ / -
Venstre	4,165	23.90	+1.98
Social Democrats	3,625	20.80	+2.76
June Movement	2,919	16.75	+0.47
Social Liberals	1,408	8.08	-0.62
Conservatives	1,328	7.62	-6.26
People's Movement against the EU	1,159	6.65	-3.19
Green Left	1,137	6.53	-1.16
Danish People's Party	1,006	5.77	New
Centre Democrats	487	2.79	+2.18
Christian Democrats	191	1.10	+0.62
Progress Party	156	0.90	-1.65
Total	17,425		

1994 European Parliament election in Denmark

Parties	Vote		
Parties	Votes	%	+ / -
Venstre	4,074	21.92	-1.11
Social Democrats	3,353	18.04	-6.99
June Movement	3,026	16.28	New
Conservatives	2,580	13.88	+3.98
People's Movement against the EU	1,829	9.84	-4.06
Social Liberals	1,617	8.70	+5.61
Green Left	1,429	7.69	-2.90
Progress Party	473	2.55	-2.89
Centre Democrats	113	0.61	-7.00
Christian Democrats	90	0.48	-0.94
Total	18,584		

1989 European Parliament election in Denmark

Parties	Vote		
Parties	Votes	%	+ / -
Social Democrats	4,060	25.03	+5.14
Venstre	3,735	23.03	+3.10
People's Movement against the EU	2,254	13.90	-0.43
Green Left	1,717	10.59	+4.02
Conservatives	1,606	9.90	-11.39
Centre Democrats	1,234	7.61	+0.78
Progress Party	882	5.44	+2.15
Social Liberals	502	3.09	-1.87
Christian Democrats	230	1.42	-0.53
Total	16,220		

1984 European Parliament election in Denmark

Parties	Vote	
Parties	Votes	%
Conservatives	3,771	21.29
Venstre	3,530	19.93
Social Democrats	3,523	19.89
People's Movement against the EU	2,539	14.33
Centre Democrats	1,210	6.83
Green Left	1,164	6.57
Social Liberals	878	4.96
Progress Party	583	3.29
Christian Democrats	346	1.95
Left Socialists	168	0.95
Total	17,712	

== Referendums ==
2022 Danish European Union opt-out referendum

Option	Votes	%
✓ YES	18,800	65.78
X NO	9,778	34.22

2015 Danish European Union opt-out referendum

Option	Votes	%
X NO	17,374	55.89
✓ YES	13,713	44.11

2014 Danish Unified Patent Court membership referendum

Option	Votes	%
✓ YES	14,488	62.24
X NO	8,791	37.76

2009 Danish Act of Succession referendum

Option	Votes	%
✓ YES	19,915	83.70
X NO	3,877	16.30

2000 Danish euro referendum

Option	Votes	%
X NO	17,780	57.17
✓ YES	13,319	42.83

1998 Danish Amsterdam Treaty referendum

Option	Votes	%
✓ YES	14,529	53.14
X NO	12,814	46.86

1993 Danish Maastricht Treaty referendum

Option	Votes	%
✓ YES	16,785	54.86
X NO	13,812	45.14

1992 Danish Maastricht Treaty referendum

Option	Votes	%
X NO	15,387	52.52
✓ YES	13,910	47.48

1986 Danish Single European Act referendum

Option	Votes	%
✓ YES	16,016	60.51
X NO	10,451	39.49

1972 Danish European Communities membership referendum

Option	Votes	%
✓ YES	18,967	68.48
X NO	8,729	31.52

1953 Danish constitutional and electoral age referendum

Option	Votes	%
✓ YES	9,712	85.92
X NO	1,592	14.08
23 years	6,050	51.94
21 years	5,598	48.06

1939 Danish constitutional referendum

Option	Votes	%
✓ YES	6,142	90.34
X NO	657	9.66
