= Tønder (nomination district) =

- Tønder
- Nomination district constituency for the Folketing
- Location of Tønder within South Jutland

- Location of South Jutland within Denmark
- Municipalities: Tønder
- Constituency: South Jutland
- Electorate: 26,559 (2022)

Current constituency
- Created: 1920

Tønder nominating district is one of the 92 nominating districts that exists for Danish elections following the 2007 municipal reform. It consists of Tønder Municipality. It was created in 1920 following its reunification with Denmark, though its boundaries have been changed since then.

In general elections, the district is a very strong area for parties commonly associated with the blue bloc.

== General elections results ==
=== General elections in the 2020s ===
2022 Danish general election

Parties	Vote		
Parties	Votes	%	+ / -
Social Democrats	5,601	26.21	+1.72
Venstre	3,277	15.33	-17.78
Denmark Democrats	3,190	14.93	New
Moderates	2,701	12.64	New
New Right	1,681	7.87	+3.35
Liberal Alliance	1,194	5.59	+3.89
Green Left	1,074	5.03	-0.40
Conservatives	983	4.60	+0.20
Danish People's Party	641	3.00	-10.07
Red–Green Alliance	335	1.57	-1.44
Social Liberals	277	1.30	-2.31
Christian Democrats	192	0.90	-2.06
The Alternative	178	0.83	-0.28
Independent Greens	26	0.12	New
Kent Nielsen	20	0.09	New
Kenneth Vestergaard	2	0.01	New
Total	21,372		

=== General elections in the 2010s ===
2019 Danish general election

Parties	Vote		
Parties	Votes	%	+ / -
Venstre	7,318	33.11	+6.43
Social Democrats	5,413	24.49	+3.20
Danish People's Party	2,889	13.07	-16.34
Green Left	1,201	5.43	+3.06
New Right	999	4.52	New
Conservatives	972	4.40	+2.38
Social Liberals	799	3.61	+1.01
Red–Green Alliance	666	3.01	-1.58
Christian Democrats	654	2.96	+1.28
Stram Kurs	424	1.92	New
Liberal Alliance	376	1.70	-5.60
The Alternative	245	1.11	-0.95
Klaus Riskær Pedersen Party	138	0.62	New
Michael Thomsen	11	0.05	New
Total	22,105		

2015 Danish general election

Parties	Vote		
Parties	Votes	%	+ / -
Danish People's Party	6,958	29.41	+15.64
Venstre	6,313	26.68	-9.83
Social Democrats	5,038	21.29	-3.06
Liberal Alliance	1,727	7.30	+2.56
Red–Green Alliance	1,087	4.59	+1.70
Social Liberals	614	2.60	-2.76
Green Left	560	2.37	-4.53
The Alternative	488	2.06	New
Conservatives	478	2.02	-1.60
Christian Democrats	397	1.68	-0.14
Total	23,660		

2011 Danish general election

Parties	Vote		
Parties	Votes	%	+ / -
Venstre	8,948	36.51	-2.89
Social Democrats	5,967	24.35	+2.32
Danish People's Party	3,374	13.77	-1.61
Green Left	1,691	6.90	-1.99
Social Liberals	1,313	5.36	+2.38
Liberal Alliance	1,162	4.74	+3.17
Conservatives	887	3.62	-4.12
Red–Green Alliance	708	2.89	+2.22
Christian Democrats	446	1.82	+0.48
Niesl-Aage Bjerre	6	0.02	New
Jørn Bjorholm	4	0.02	New
Total	24,506		

=== General elections in the 2000s ===
2007 Danish general election

Parties	Vote		
Parties	Votes	%	+ / -
Venstre	9,733	39.40	-1.00
Social Democrats	5,443	22.03	-1.94
Danish People's Party	3,799	15.38	+1.94
Green Left	2,196	8.89	+5.18
Conservatives	1,913	7.74	+0.20
Social Liberals	736	2.98	-2.68
New Alliance	388	1.57	New
Christian Democrats	332	1.34	-0.72
Red–Green Alliance	166	0.67	-1.15
Total	24,706		

2005 Danish general election

Parties	Vote		
Parties	Votes	%	+ / -
Venstre	6,321	40.40	-1.51
Social Democrats	3,750	23.97	-2.64
Danish People's Party	2,103	13.44	+2.23
Conservatives	1,180	7.54	-0.09
Social Liberals	886	5.66	+2.53
Green Left	581	3.71	-0.09
Christian Democrats	322	2.06	-0.12
Red–Green Alliance	285	1.82	+0.64
Centre Democrats	175	1.12	-0.24
Minority Party	42	0.27	New
Total	15,645		

2001 Danish general election

Parties	Vote		
Parties	Votes	%	+ / -
Venstre	6,973	41.91	+7.51
Social Democrats	4,428	26.61	-6.26
Danish People's Party	1,865	11.21	+10.46
Conservatives	1,269	7.63	+1.23
Green Left	633	3.80	-0.45
Social Liberals	520	3.13	+0.32
Christian People's Party	363	2.18	-0.79
Centre Democrats	227	1.36	-2.49
Red–Green Alliance	196	1.18	-0.15
Progress Party	164	0.99	-1.76
Total	16,638		

=== General elections in the 1990s ===
1998 Danish general election

Parties	Vote		
Parties	Votes	%	+ / -
Venstre	5,750	34.40	+1.07
Social Democrats	5,494	32.87	-0.25
Democratic Renewal	1,265	7.57	New
Conservatives	1,070	6.40	-6.56
Green Left	711	4.25	+0.66
Centre Democrats	643	3.85	+1.97
Christian People's Party	497	2.97	+0.59
Social Liberals	470	2.81	-0.40
Progress Party	459	2.75	-4.96
Red–Green Alliance	222	1.33	-0.44
Danish People's Party	126	0.75	New
Leon Elmkjær	7	0.04	-0.01
Total	16,714		

1994 Danish general election

Parties	Vote		
Parties	Votes	%	+ / -
Venstre	5,440	33.33	+7.48
Social Democrats	5,405	33.12	+1.01
Conservatives	2,116	12.96	-3.51
Progress Party	1,258	7.71	-0.99
Green Left	586	3.59	-0.68
Social Liberals	524	3.21	+0.30
Christian People's Party	388	2.38	-0.46
Centre Democrats	307	1.88	-2.03
Red–Green Alliance	289	1.77	+1.24
Leon Elmkjær	8	0.05	New
Total	16,321		

1990 Danish general election

Parties	Vote		
Parties	Votes	%	+ / -
Social Democrats	5,195	32.11	+5.75
Venstre	4,182	25.85	+3.15
Conservatives	2,664	16.47	-3.37
Progress Party	1,408	8.70	-2.93
Green Left	690	4.27	-1.96
Centre Democrats	633	3.91	+0.57
Social Liberals	470	2.91	-1.42
Christian People's Party	460	2.84	+0.16
Common Course	220	1.36	+0.17
The Greens	89	0.55	-0.46
Red–Green Alliance	85	0.53	New
Justice Party of Denmark	82	0.51	New
Total	16,178		

=== General elections in the 1980s ===
1988 Danish general election

Parties	Vote		
Parties	Votes	%	+ / -
Social Democrats	4,469	26.36	-1.54
Venstre	3,848	22.70	+1.77
Conservatives	3,363	19.84	-2.68
Progress Party	1,971	11.63	+4.36
Green Left	1,056	6.23	-0.69
Social Liberals	734	4.33	-0.23
Centre Democrats	567	3.34	-0.17
Christian People's Party	454	2.68	-0.22
Common Course	202	1.19	+0.07
The Greens	171	1.01	-0.01
Communist Party of Denmark	86	0.51	+0.06
Left Socialists	33	0.19	-0.17
Total	16,954		

1987 Danish general election

Parties	Vote		
Parties	Votes	%	+ / -
Social Democrats	4,799	27.90	+1.53
Conservatives	3,873	22.52	-5.41
Venstre	3,600	20.93	+0.94
Progress Party	1,251	7.27	+1.79
Green Left	1,190	6.92	+1.26
Social Liberals	785	4.56	+0.78
Centre Democrats	604	3.51	-1.03
Christian People's Party	498	2.90	-0.82
Common Course	193	1.12	New
The Greens	175	1.02	New
Communist Party of Denmark	78	0.45	+0.11
Justice Party of Denmark	72	0.42	-0.57
Left Socialists	62	0.36	-0.82
Humanist Party	11	0.06	New
Socialist Workers Party	6	0.03	0.00
Marxist–Leninists Party	4	0.02	+0.01
Total	17,201		

1984 Danish general election

Parties	Vote		
Parties	Votes	%	+ / -
Conservatives	4,872	27.93	+12.37
Social Democrats	4,600	26.37	-2.64
Venstre	3,488	19.99	-2.50
Green Left	988	5.66	-0.06
Progress Party	956	5.48	-5.37
Centre Democrats	792	4.54	-1.16
Social Liberals	659	3.78	-0.39
Christian People's Party	649	3.72	+0.68
Left Socialists	205	1.18	-0.06
Justice Party of Denmark	172	0.99	-0.36
Communist Party of Denmark	59	0.34	-0.38
Socialist Workers Party	5	0.03	-0.03
Marxist–Leninists Party	1	0.01	New
Total	17,446		

1981 Danish general election

Parties	Vote		
Parties	Votes	%	+ / -
Social Democrats	4,737	29.01	-3.25
Venstre	3,672	22.49	+2.54
Conservatives	2,541	15.56	+2.02
Progress Party	1,771	10.85	-3.12
Green Left	934	5.72	+2.68
Centre Democrats	931	5.70	+2.46
Social Liberals	681	4.17	+0.24
Christian People's Party	497	3.04	-0.96
Justice Party of Denmark	220	1.35	-1.19
Left Socialists	202	1.24	-0.84
Communist Party of Denmark	117	0.72	-0.46
Communist Workers Party	15	0.09	-0.18
Socialist Workers Party	10	0.06	New
Total	16,328		

=== General elections in the 1970s ===
1979 Danish general election

Parties	Vote		
Parties	Votes	%	+ / -
Social Democrats	5,175	32.26	+3.35
Venstre	3,201	19.95	+1.43
Progress Party	2,241	13.97	-3.58
Conservatives	2,172	13.54	+5.18
Christian People's Party	642	4.00	-1.09
Social Liberals	631	3.93	+0.40
Centre Democrats	520	3.24	-6.25
Green Left	487	3.04	+0.92
Justice Party of Denmark	407	2.54	-0.08
Left Socialists	333	2.08	+0.56
Communist Party of Denmark	190	1.18	-0.44
Communist Workers Party	44	0.27	New
Total	16,043		

1977 Danish general election

Parties	Vote		
Parties	Votes	%	+ / -
Social Democrats	4,647	28.91	+5.27
Venstre	2,977	18.52	-10.72
Progress Party	2,821	17.55	+2.08
Centre Democrats	1,525	9.49	+2.94
Conservatives	1,344	8.36	+2.03
Christian People's Party	818	5.09	-1.25
Social Liberals	568	3.53	-1.95
Justice Party of Denmark	421	2.62	+0.78
Green Left	341	2.12	+0.05
Communist Party of Denmark	260	1.62	-0.12
Left Socialists	244	1.52	+0.24
Pensioners' Party	106	0.66	New
Total	16,072		

1975 Danish general election

Parties	Vote		
Parties	Votes	%	+ / -
Venstre	4,598	29.24	+11.94
Social Democrats	3,717	23.64	+2.47
Progress Party	2,433	15.47	-1.78
Centre Democrats	1,030	6.55	-3.93
Christian People's Party	997	6.34	+1.16
Conservatives	995	6.33	-3.98
Social Liberals	861	5.48	-5.26
Green Left	326	2.07	-0.86
Justice Party of Denmark	290	1.84	-0.70
Communist Party of Denmark	274	1.74	+0.54
Left Socialists	202	1.28	+0.44
Marinus Roth	2	0.01	-0.04
Total	15,725		

1973 Danish general election

Parties	Vote		
Parties	Votes	%	+ / -
Social Democrats	3,321	21.17	-9.94
Venstre	2,713	17.30	-3.49
Progress Party	2,705	17.25	New
Social Liberals	1,685	10.74	-2.63
Centre Democrats	1,644	10.48	New
Conservatives	1,617	10.31	-5.84
Christian People's Party	813	5.18	+2.34
Green Left	459	2.93	-0.94
Justice Party of Denmark	399	2.54	+0.68
Communist Party of Denmark	189	1.20	+0.79
Left Socialists	132	0.84	+0.13
Marinus Roth	8	0.05	+0.04
Total	15,685		

1971 Danish general election

Parties	Vote		
Parties	Votes	%	+ / -
Social Democrats	4,553	31.11	+3.18
Venstre	3,043	20.79	-4.73
Conservatives	2,364	16.15	-3.00
Social Liberals	1,957	13.37	-0.57
Schleswig Party	1,301	8.89	+1.54
Green Left	566	3.87	+1.57
Christian People's Party	416	2.84	New
Justice Party of Denmark	272	1.86	+0.64
Left Socialists	104	0.71	-0.07
Communist Party of Denmark	60	0.41	+0.10
Marinus Roth	1	0.01	New
Total	14,637		

=== General elections in the 1960s ===
1968 Danish general election

Parties	Vote		
Parties	Votes	%	+ / -
Social Democrats	4,253	27.93	-7.49
Venstre	3,885	25.52	-2.61
Conservatives	2,916	19.15	-0.95
Social Liberals	2,122	13.94	+6.77
Schleswig Party	1,119	7.35	New
Green Left	350	2.30	-1.31
Justice Party of Denmark	186	1.22	+0.09
Independent Party	119	0.78	-1.79
Left Socialists	119	0.78	New
Liberal Centre	110	0.72	-0.86
Communist Party of Denmark	47	0.31	+0.01
Total	15,226		

1966 Danish general election

Parties	Vote		
Parties	Votes	%	+ / -
Social Democrats	5,138	35.42	+3.19
Venstre	4,080	28.13	+1.25
Conservatives	2,915	20.10	+2.36
Social Liberals	1,040	7.17	+1.11
Green Left	524	3.61	+2.06
Independent Party	373	2.57	+0.88
Liberal Centre	229	1.58	New
Justice Party of Denmark	164	1.13	-0.88
Communist Party of Denmark	43	0.30	-0.12
Total	14,506		

1964 Danish general election

Parties	Vote		
Parties	Votes	%	+ / -
Social Democrats	4,634	32.23	+2.48
Venstre	3,865	26.88	-1.44
Conservatives	2,550	17.74	+1.39
Schleswig Party	1,587	11.04	-0.73
Social Liberals	871	6.06	-0.29
Justice Party of Denmark	289	2.01	-0.84
Independent Party	243	1.69	-0.69
Green Left	223	1.55	-0.13
Communist Party of Denmark	61	0.42	-0.13
Danish Unity	54	0.38	New
Total	14,377		

1960 Danish general election

Parties	Vote		
Parties	Votes	%	+ / -
Social Democrats	3,993	29.75	+3.22
Venstre	3,800	28.32	-3.62
Conservatives	2,194	16.35	+1.25
Schleswig Party	1,580	11.77	-0.16
Social Liberals	852	6.35	-0.27
Justice Party of Denmark	383	2.85	-2.34
Independent Party	319	2.38	+0.88
Green Left	225	1.68	New
Communist Party of Denmark	74	0.55	-0.65
Total	13,420		

=== General elections in the 1950s ===
1957 Danish general election

Parties	Vote		
Parties	Votes	%	+ / -
Venstre	4,186	31.94	+1.47
Social Democrats	3,476	26.53	-1.40
Conservatives	1,979	15.10	+0.13
Schleswig Party	1,563	11.93	New
Social Liberals	867	6.62	+0.61
Justice Party of Denmark	680	5.19	+1.06
Independent Party	196	1.50	-0.02
Communist Party of Denmark	157	1.20	-0.37
Total	13,104		

September 1953 Danish Folketing election

Parties	Vote		
Parties	Votes	%	+ / -
Venstre	3,813	30.47	+2.12
Social Democrats	3,495	27.93	-0.37
Conservatives	1,873	14.97	-1.03
Hans Schmidt	1,676	13.40	+1.21
Social Liberals	752	6.01	-0.49
Justice Party of Denmark	517	4.13	-1.67
Communist Party of Denmark	196	1.57	-0.54
Independent Party	190	1.52	New
Total	12,512		

April 1953 Danish Folketing election

Parties	Vote		
Parties	Votes	%	+ / -
Venstre	3,316	28.35	-0.73
Social Democrats	3,310	28.30	+0.04
Conservatives	1,871	16.00	+0.94
Hans Schmidt	1,426	12.19	+2.47
Social Liberals	760	6.50	+0.45
Justice Party of Denmark	678	5.80	-3.90
Communist Party of Denmark	247	2.11	-0.01
Danish Unity	88	0.75	New
Total	11,696		

1950 Danish Folketing election

Parties	Vote		
Parties	Votes	%	+ / -
Venstre	3,380	29.08	-5.58
Social Democrats	3,285	28.26	-0.07
Conservatives	1,751	15.06	+4.79
Hans Schmidt	1,130	9.72	New
Justice Party of Denmark	1,128	9.70	+4.85
Social Liberals	703	6.05	+1.59
Communist Party of Denmark	246	2.12	-0.38
Total	11,623		

=== General elections in the 1940s ===
1947 Danish Folketing election

Parties	Vote		
Parties	Votes	%	+ / -
Venstre	4,098	34.66	-5.02
Social Democrats	3,349	28.33	+1.50
W. Reuter	1,222	10.34	New
Conservatives	1,214	10.27	-4.98
Justice Party of Denmark	574	4.85	+1.73
Social Liberals	527	4.46	-4.00
J. Christmas Møller	438	3.70	New
Communist Party of Denmark	296	2.50	-1.27
Danish Unity	105	0.89	-1.99
Total	11,823		

1945 Danish Folketing election

Parties	Vote		
Parties	Votes	%	+ / -
Venstre	4,539	39.68	+11.85
Social Democrats	3,069	26.83	-7.60
Conservatives	1,745	15.25	-4.14
Social Liberals	968	8.46	+1.24
Communist Party of Denmark	431	3.77	New
Justice Party of Denmark	357	3.12	+0.03
Danish Unity	330	2.88	+1.80
Total	11,439		

1943 Danish Folketing election

Parties	Vote		
Parties	Votes	%	+ / -
Social Democrats	3,521	34.43	-0.32
Venstre	2,846	27.83	+4.27
Conservatives	1,983	19.39	+1.39
Social Liberals	738	7.22	+1.37
National Socialist Workers' Party of Denmark	499	4.88	+0.49
Justice Party of Denmark	316	3.09	+1.64
Farmers' Party	215	2.10	New
Danish Unity	110	1.08	New
Total	10,228		

=== General elections in the 1930s ===
1939 Danish Folketing election

Parties	Vote		
Parties	Votes	%	+ / -
Social Democrats	4,011	34.75	+7.50
Venstre	2,719	23.56	+7.23
Conservatives	2,078	18.00	+2.10
Schleswig Party	1,327	11.50	-7.68
Social Liberals	675	5.85	+0.57
National Socialist Workers' Party of Denmark	507	4.39	-1.31
Justice Party of Denmark	167	1.45	-2.47
National Cooperation	59	0.51	New
Total	11,543		

1935 Danish Folketing election

Parties	Vote		
Parties	Votes	%	+ / -
Social Democrats	2,962	27.25	+3.62
Schleswig Party	2,085	19.18	+1.94
Venstre	1,775	16.33	-7.48
Conservatives	1,728	15.90	-5.72
National Socialist Workers' Party of Denmark	620	5.70	New
Independent People's Party	587	5.40	New
Social Liberals	574	5.28	-2.36
Justice Party of Denmark	426	3.92	-0.81
Communist Party of Denmark	93	0.86	-0.46
Society Party	21	0.19	New
Total	10,871		

1932 Danish Folketing election

Parties	Vote		
Parties	Votes	%	+ / -
Venstre	2,389	23.81	-8.24
Social Democrats	2,371	23.63	+1.23
Conservatives	2,169	21.62	+3.55
Schleswig Party	1,730	17.24	-1.54
Social Liberals	766	7.64	+1.91
Justice Party of Denmark	475	4.73	+1.92
Communist Party of Denmark	132	1.32	+1.16
Total	10,032		

=== General elections in the 1920s ===
1929 Danish Folketing election

Parties	Vote		
Parties	Votes	%	+ / -
Venstre	3,035	32.05	-3.05
Social Democrats	2,121	22.40	+5.01
Schleswig Party	1,778	18.78	-0.11
Conservatives	1,711	18.07	+0.57
Social Liberals	543	5.73	-0.50
Justice Party of Denmark	266	2.81	+1.30
Communist Party of Denmark	15	0.16	-0.05
Total	9,469		

1926 Danish Folketing election

Parties	Vote		
Parties	Votes	%	+ / -
Venstre	3,398	35.10	+2.97
Schleswig Party	1,829	18.89	+1.14
Conservatives	1,694	17.50	-5.02
Social Democrats	1,684	17.39	+1.34
Social Liberals	603	6.23	-3.41
Independence Party	307	3.17	New
Justice Party of Denmark	146	1.51	+1.31
Communist Party of Denmark	20	0.21	New
Total	9,681		

1924 Danish Folketing election

Parties	Vote		
Parties	Votes	%	+ / -
Venstre	2,665	32.13	-11.96
Conservatives	1,868	22.52	-0.34
Schleswig Party	1,472	17.75	-0.24
Social Democrats	1,331	16.05	+8.12
Social Liberals	800	9.64	+4.18
Farmer Party	142	1.71	New
Justice Party of Denmark	17	0.20	New
Total	8,295		

September 1920 Danish Folketing election

Parties	Vote		
Parties	Votes	%	+ / -
Venstre	3,384	44.09	
Conservatives	1,755	22.86	
Schleswig Party	1,381	17.99	
Social Democrats	609	7.93	
Social Liberals	419	5.46	
Industry Party	72	0.94	
Danish Left Socialist Party	56	0.73	
Total	7,676		

== European Parliament elections results ==
2024 European Parliament election in Denmark

Parties	Vote		
Parties	Votes	%	+ / -
Venstre	3,736	27.00	-5.45
Social Democrats	2,183	15.78	-4.71
Denmark Democrats	2,127	15.37	New
Green Left	1,242	8.98	+1.43
Danish People's Party	1,176	8.50	-8.67
Conservatives	1,006	7.27	+2.52
Liberal Alliance	927	6.70	+2.15
Moderates	629	4.55	New
Social Liberals	351	2.54	-3.28
Red–Green Alliance	286	2.07	-0.66
The Alternative	175	1.26	-0.18
Total	13,838		

2019 European Parliament election in Denmark

Parties	Vote		
Parties	Votes	%	+ / -
Venstre	5,439	32.45	+6.55
Social Democrats	3,434	20.49	+4.59
Danish People's Party	2,878	17.17	-13.84
Green Left	1,265	7.55	+1.55
Social Liberals	975	5.82	+2.74
Conservatives	796	4.75	-5.84
Liberal Alliance	763	4.55	+2.11
People's Movement against the EU	512	3.05	-2.03
Red–Green Alliance	457	2.73	New
The Alternative	241	1.44	New
Total	16,760		

2014 European Parliament election in Denmark

Parties	Vote		
Parties	Votes	%	+ / -
Danish People's Party	4,524	31.01	+14.97
Venstre	3,779	25.90	-5.47
Social Democrats	2,319	15.90	-1.34
Conservatives	1,545	10.59	-3.69
Green Left	875	6.00	-4.63
People's Movement against the EU	741	5.08	-0.10
Social Liberals	449	3.08	+0.30
Liberal Alliance	356	2.44	+2.12
Total	14,588		

2009 European Parliament election in Denmark

Parties	Vote		
Parties	Votes	%	+ / -
Venstre	4,943	31.37	+3.27
Social Democrats	2,717	17.24	-16.57
Danish People's Party	2,528	16.04	+10.02
Conservatives	2,251	14.28	+4.26
Green Left	1,675	10.63	+5.97
People's Movement against the EU	817	5.18	+1.49
Social Liberals	438	2.78	-0.69
June Movement	339	2.15	-6.80
Liberal Alliance	50	0.32	New
Total	15,758		

2004 European Parliament election in Denmark

Parties	Vote		
Parties	Votes	%	+ / -
Social Democrats	2,950	33.81	+19.53
Venstre	2,452	28.10	-1.63
Conservatives	874	10.02	-3.65
June Movement	781	8.95	-5.94
Danish People's Party	525	6.02	+1.75
Green Left	407	4.66	+0.83
People's Movement against the EU	322	3.69	-3.27
Social Liberals	303	3.47	-3.35
Christian Democrats	111	1.27	-0.74
Total	8,725		

1999 European Parliament election in Denmark

Parties	Vote		
Parties	Votes	%	+ / -
Venstre	2,554	29.73	+1.93
June Movement	1,279	14.89	+4.89
Social Democrats	1,227	14.28	-1.08
Conservatives	1,174	13.67	-8.14
People's Movement against the EU	598	6.96	-2.72
Social Liberals	586	6.82	+1.92
Danish People's Party	367	4.27	New
Green Left	329	3.83	-0.80
Centre Democrats	304	3.54	+2.75
Christian Democrats	173	2.01	+0.54
Progress Party	127	1.48	-2.10
Total	8,591		

1994 European Parliament election in Denmark

Parties	Vote		
Parties	Votes	%	+ / -
Venstre	2,853	27.80	-1.43
Conservatives	2,238	21.81	+8.20
Social Democrats	1,576	15.36	-6.63
June Movement	1,026	10.00	New
People's Movement against the EU	993	9.68	-0.38
Social Liberals	503	4.90	+2.24
Green Left	475	4.63	+0.43
Progress Party	367	3.58	-3.54
Christian Democrats	151	1.47	-1.51
Centre Democrats	81	0.79	-7.35
Total	10,263		

1989 European Parliament election in Denmark

Parties	Vote		
Parties	Votes	%	+ / -
Venstre	2,635	29.23	+5.65
Social Democrats	1,982	21.99	+4.73
Conservatives	1,227	13.61	-9.92
People's Movement against the EU	907	10.06	-2.81
Centre Democrats	734	8.14	+0.52
Progress Party	642	7.12	+3.13
Green Left	379	4.20	+0.13
Christian Democrats	269	2.98	-0.63
Social Liberals	240	2.66	-0.37
Total	9,015		

1984 European Parliament election in Denmark

Parties	Vote	
Parties	Votes	%
Venstre	2,493	23.58
Conservatives	2,488	23.53
Social Democrats	1,825	17.26
People's Movement against the EU	1,361	12.87
Centre Democrats	806	7.62
Green Left	430	4.07
Progress Party	422	3.99
Christian Democrats	382	3.61
Social Liberals	320	3.03
Left Socialists	47	0.44
Total	10,574	

== Referendums ==
2022 Danish European Union opt-out referendum

Option	Votes	%
✓ YES	10,295	60.58
X NO	6,700	39.42

2015 Danish European Union opt-out referendum

Option	Votes	%
X NO	11,080	55.50
✓ YES	8,885	44.50

2014 Danish Unified Patent Court membership referendum

Option	Votes	%
✓ YES	9,408	66.19
X NO	4,805	33.81

2009 Danish Act of Succession referendum

Option	Votes	%
✓ YES	12,833	84.49
X NO	2,355	15.51

2000 Danish euro referendum

Option	Votes	%
X NO	8,877	52.36
✓ YES	8,077	47.64

1998 Danish Amsterdam Treaty referendum

Option	Votes	%
✓ YES	8,611	57.54
X NO	6,355	42.46

1993 Danish Maastricht Treaty referendum

Option	Votes	%
✓ YES	10,582	62.36
X NO	6,386	37.64

1992 Danish Maastricht Treaty referendum

Option	Votes	%
✓ YES	9,018	56.32
X NO	6,994	43.68

1986 Danish Single European Act referendum

Option	Votes	%
✓ YES	15,415	58.12
X NO	11,107	41.88

1972 Danish European Communities membership referendum

Option	Votes	%
✓ YES	12,319	77.10
X NO	3,659	22.90

1953 Danish constitutional and electoral age referendum

Option	Votes	%
✓ YES	7,102	87.12
X NO	1,050	12.88
23 years	5,374	64.15
21 years	3,003	35.85

1939 Danish constitutional referendum

Option	Votes	%
✓ YES	3,573	91.80
X NO	319	8.20
