= Ib Christensen =

Danish politician (1930–2023)

Member of the European Parliament for Denmark
- In office 24 July 1984 – 18 July 1994

Member of the Folketing for Århus County
- In office 15 February 1977 – 7 December 1981
- In office 4 December 1973 – 8 January 1975

Personal details
- Born: 15 March 1930 Vorup, Denmark
- Died: 3 January 2023 (aged 92) Randers, Denmark
- Party: Justice Party of Denmark; People's Movement against the EU
- Occupation: Psychologist

Ib Christensen (15 March 1930 – 3 January 2023) was a Danish politician. A member of the Justice Party of Denmark and the People's Movement against the EU, he served in the Folketing from 1973 to 1975 and again from 1977 to 1981. He was also a Member of the European Parliament from 1984 to 1994.

Christensen died in Randers on 3 January 2023, at the age of 92.
