= Justice Party of Denmark =

Justice Party Retsforbundet
- Leader: Collective leadership
- Spokesperson: Poul Gerhard Kristiansen
- Founded: 21 October 1919
- Headquarters: Lyngbyvej 42; 2100 København Ø
- Ideology: Georgism; Geolibertarianism; Hard Euroscepticism
- Folketing: 0 / 179
- Municipal councils: 0 / 2,444

Election symbol
- E

Website
- http://www.retsforbundet.dk/

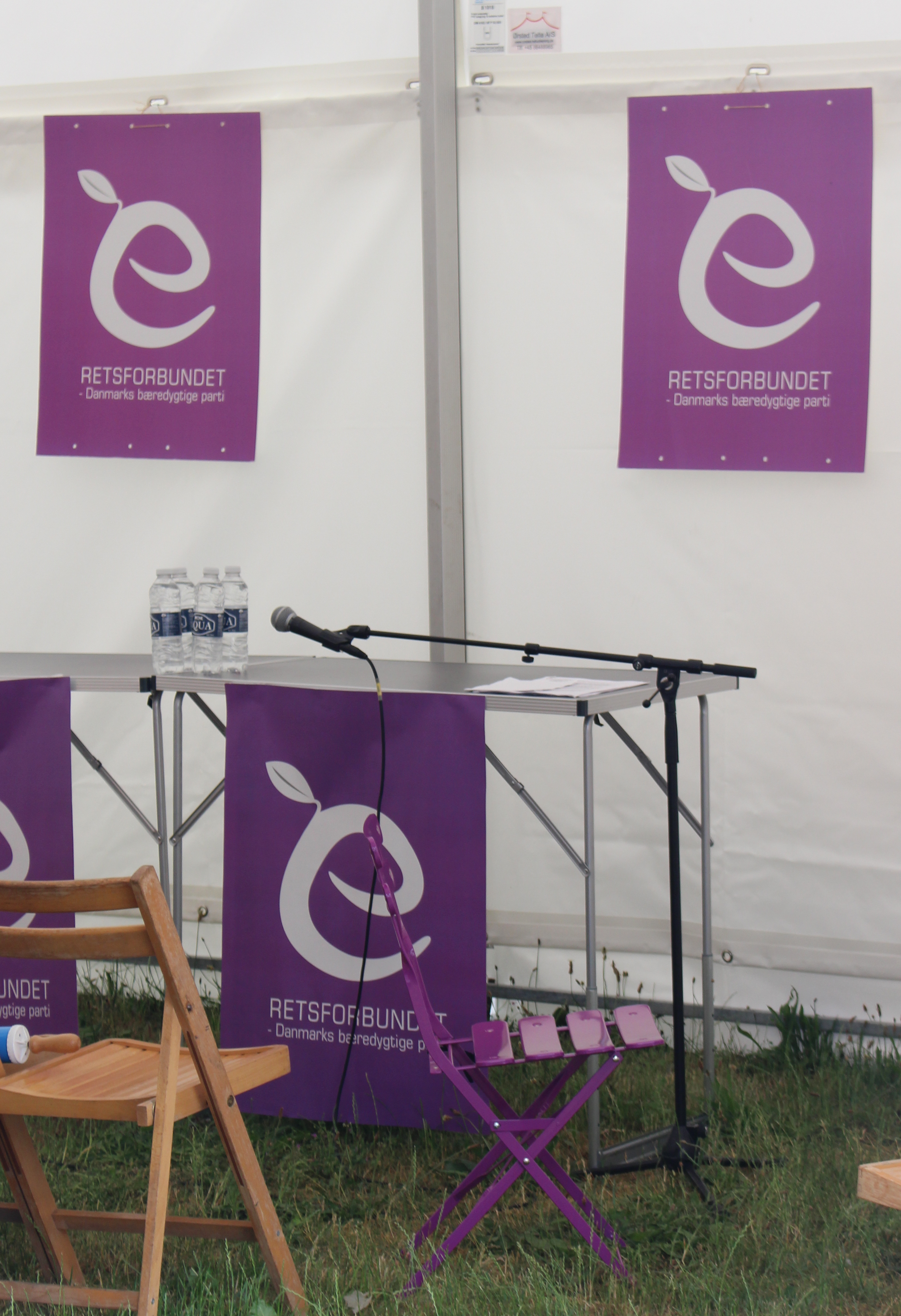
Justice Party's tent at Folkemødet 2016

Vejen Frem from 1945

The Justice Party (Danish: Retsforbundet) of Denmark was founded in 1919 as an association and transformed into a political party in 1922. The party's platform is based upon the principles of U.S. economist Henry George — who advocated a single tax on all land — and those of Danish moral philosopher Severin Christensen.

The party was elected to parliament for the first time in 1926, and they were moderately successful in the post-war period and managed to join a governing coalition with the Social Democrats and the Social Liberal Party from the years 1957–60. In 1960 they dropped out of the parliament. However, in the 1973 Danish parliamentary election (the so-called Landslide Election) the party won 5 seats in Folketinget, because of their opposition to Danish membership of the European Economic Community. They lost their seats in the next election in 1975, but regained representation in 1977 and were represented until 1981. They also had a seat in the European Parliament 1978–79 (by Ib Christensen).

The 1970s were followed by a dropoff of party support, and the party ceased to run at a national level in 1990, but in 2005 the party ran together with Minoritetspartiet (the Minority Party): this wasn't with any success since the Minority Party only achieved 0.3% of the votes.

They also adopted a new communication strategy with four main policies: Danish exit from the EU, a better environmental policy, a humanitarian refugee and immigration policy and a tax reform with a 6% land tax financing a lower income tax and a reduction of the VAT on basic commodities from 25% to 12.5%. Their youth organization Retsforbundets Ungdom has been reinvigorated.

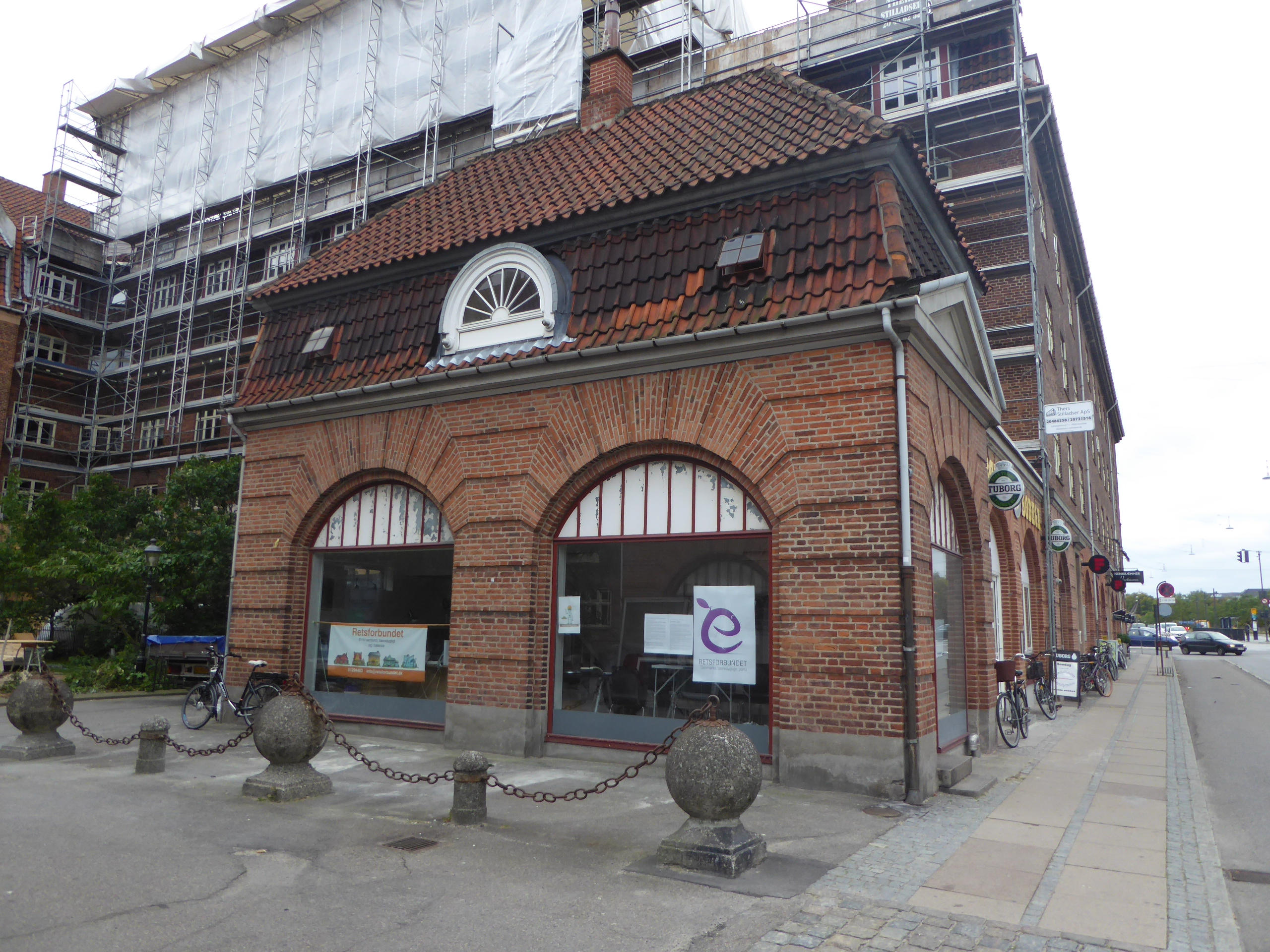
The head office of the Justice Party of Denmark at Lyngbyvej, Østerbro in Copenhagen.

== Election results ==
=== Parliament (Folketing) ===
Date	Votes			Seats	
Date	#	%	± pp	#	±
1924	12,643	1.0%	+1.0	0 / 149	New
1926	17,463	1.3%	+0.3	2 / 149	▲2
1929	25,810	1.8%	+0.5	3 / 149	▲1
1932	41,238	2.7%	+0.9	4 / 149	▲1
1935	41,199	2.5%	-0.2	4 / 149	0
1939	33,783	2.0%	-0.5	3 / 149	▼1
1943	31,323	1.6%	-0.4	2 / 149	▼1
1945	38,459	1.9%	+0.3	3 / 149	▲1
1947	94,570	4.5%	+2.6	6 / 150	▲3
1950	168,784	8.2%	+3.7	12 / 151	▲6
1953 (Apr)	116,288	5.6%	-2.6	9 / 151	▼3
1953 (Sep)	75,449	3.5%	-2.1	6 / 179	▼3
1957	122,759	5.3%	+1.8	9 / 179	▲3
1960	52,330	2.2%	-3.1	0 / 179	▼9
1964	34,258	1.3%	-0.9	0 / 179	0
1966	19,905	0.7%	-0.6	0 / 179	0
1968	21,124	0.7%	0.0	0 / 179	0
1971	50,231	1.7%	+1.0	0 / 179	0
1973	87,904	2.9%	+1.2	5 / 179	▲5
1975	54,095	1.8%	-1.1	0 / 179	▼5
1977	102,149	3.3%	+1.5	6 / 179	▲6
1979	83,238	2.6%	-0.7	5 / 179	▼1
1981	45,174	1.4%	-1.2	0 / 179	▼5
1984	50,381	1.5%	+0.1	0 / 179	0
1987	16,359	0.5%	-1.0	0 / 179	0
1988	Did not run.				
1990	17,181	0.5%	+0.5	0 / 179	0
1994–present	Did not run.				

=== Municipal elections ===
Date	Seats	
Date	#	±
2001	0 / 4,647	0
2005	0 / 2,522	0
2009	0 / 2,468	0
2013	0 / 2,444	0

=== Regional elections ===
Date	Votes	Seats	
Date	Votes	#	±
2001	1,313	0 / 374	0
2005	1,789	0 / 205	0
2009	1,369	0 / 205	0
2013	2,655	0 / 205	0
