= 1977 Danish general election =

- 15 February 1977
- All 179 seats in the Folketing; 90 seats needed for a majority
- Turnout: 88.70%
Party	Leader	Vote %	Seats	+/–
Social Democrats	Anker Jørgensen	37.03	65	+12
Progress	Mogens Glistrup	14.61	26	+2
Venstre	Poul Hartling	11.97	21	−21
Conservatives	Poul Schlüter	8.48	15	+5
Centre Democrats	Erhard Jakobsen	6.45	11	+7
SF	Gert Petersen	3.87	7	−2
Communists	Knud Jespersen	3.67	7	0
Social Liberals	Svend Haugaard	3.65	6	−7
KrF	Jens Møller	3.42	6	−3
Justice	Ib Christensen	3.29	6	+6
Left Socialists	Collective leadership	2.69	5	+1
Elected in the Faroe Islands
Union	Pauli Ellefsen	31.71	1	+1
Social Democratic	Atli Dam	22.52	1	0
Elected in Greenland
Independents	–	100	2	0
This lists parties that won seats. See the complete results below.

Government before	Government after election
Jørgensen II; Social Democrats	Jørgensen II; Social Democrats

General elections were held in Denmark on 15 February 1977. The Social Democratic Party remained the largest in the Folketing, with 65 of the 179 seats. Voter turnout was 89% in Denmark proper, 63% in the Faroe Islands and 70% in Greenland.

== Results ==
Party	Votes	%	Seats	+/–
Denmark proper
Social Democrats	1,150,355	37.03	65	+12
Progress Party	453,792	14.61	26	+2
Venstre	371,728	11.97	21	–21
Conservative People's Party	263,262	8.48	15	+5
Centre Democrats	200,347	6.45	11	+7
Socialist People's Party	120,357	3.87	7	–2
Communist Party of Denmark	114,022	3.67	7	0
Danish Social Liberal Party	113,330	3.65	6	–7
Christian People's Party	106,082	3.42	6	–3
Justice Party of Denmark	102,149	3.29	6	+6
Left Socialists	83,667	2.69	5	+1
Pensioners' Party	26,889	0.87	0	New
Independents	317	0.01	0	0
Total	3,106,297	100.00	175	0
Valid votes	3,106,297	99.40		
Invalid/blank votes	18,670	0.60		
Total votes	3,124,967	100.00		
Registered voters/turnout	3,522,904	88.70		
Faroe Islands
Union Party	5,183	31.71	1	+1
Social Democratic Party	3,681	22.52	1	0
Republican Party	3,057	18.71	0	–1
People's Party	2,773	16.97	0	0
Self-Government	551	3.37	0	New
Progress Party	207	1.27	0	New
Independents	891	5.45	0	New
Total	16,343	100.00	2	0
Valid votes	16,343	99.74		
Invalid/blank votes	43	0.26		
Total votes	16,386	100.00		
Registered voters/turnout	26,040	62.93		
Greenland
Independents	17,605	100.00	2	0
Total	17,605	100.00	2	0
Valid votes	17,605	97.87		
Invalid/blank votes	384	2.13		
Total votes	17,989	100.00		
Registered voters/turnout	25,691	70.02		
Source: Nohlen & Stöver
