= 1953 Danish general election =

- 22 September 1953
- All 179 seats in the Folketing; 90 seats needed for a majority
- Turnout: 80.58%
Party	Leader	Vote %	Seats	+/–
Social Democrats	Hans Hedtoft	41.31	74	+13
Venstre	Erik Eriksen	23.06	42	+9
Conservatives	Ole Bjørn Kraft	16.85	30	+4
Social Liberals	Jørgen Jørgensen	7.81	14	+1
Communists	Aksel Larsen	4.33	8	+1
Justice	Viggo Stacke	3.48	6	−3
Schleswig Party		0.45	1	+1
Elected in the Faroe Islands
Social Democratic	Peter Mohr Dam	–	1	0
Union	Johan Poulsen	–	1	+1
Elected in Greenland
Independents	–	100	2	New
This lists parties that won seats. See the complete results below.
Government before	Government after election
Eriksen Cabinet; V–K	Hedtoft III Cabinet; Social Democrats

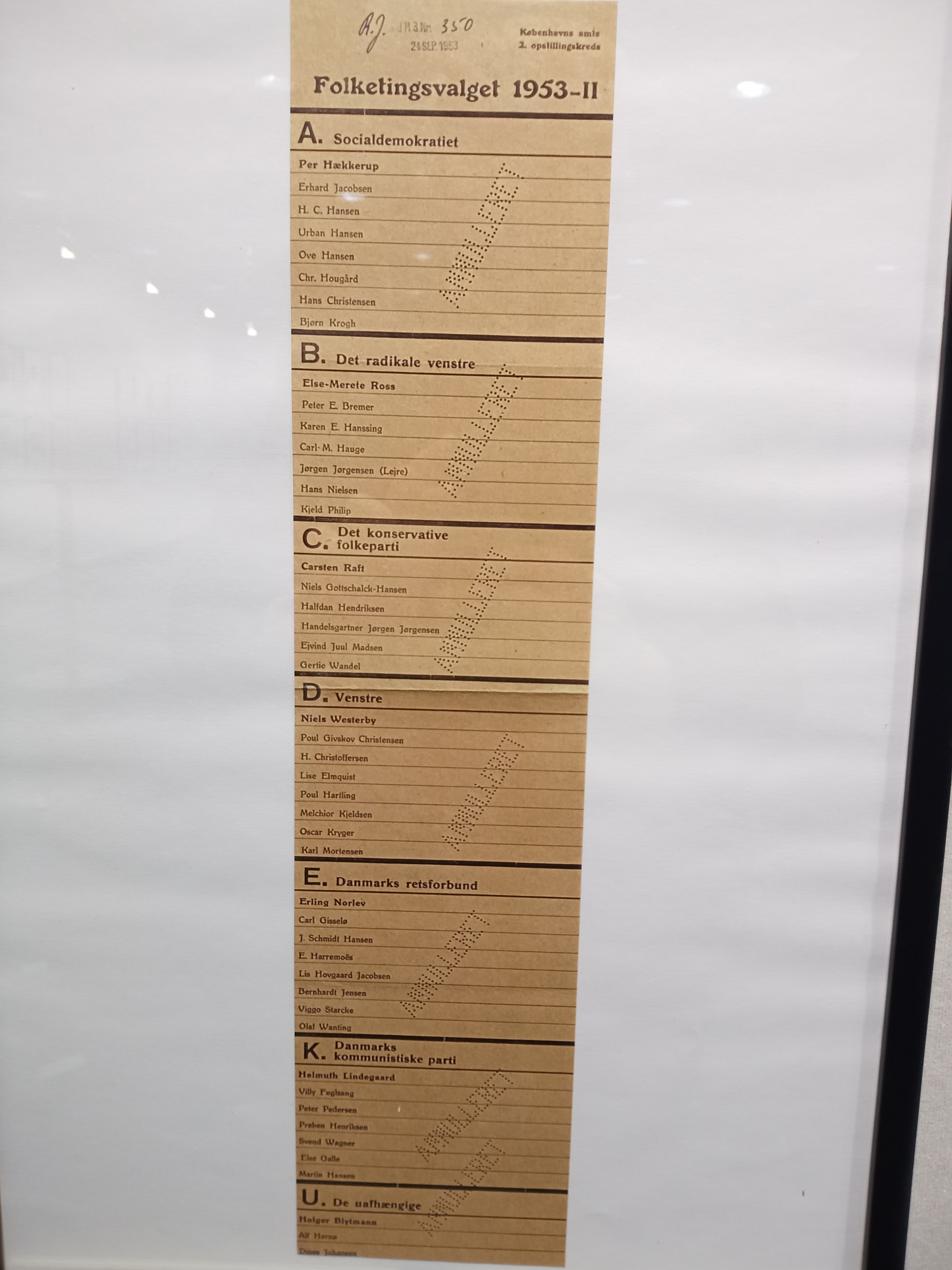
Ballot paper in Copenhagen district

General elections were held in the Kingdom of Denmark on 22 September 1953, the first under the new constitution. The Social Democratic Party remained the largest in the Folketing, with 74 of the 179 seats. Voter turnout was 81% in Denmark proper and 69% in Greenland. The electoral threshold was 60,000 votes.

== Electoral system changes ==
This election was held as a result of the passing of the 1953 Danish constitution. The new election law of 1953 increased the size of the Folketing from 151 to 179 members. The number of district seats was increased from 105 to 135, while the number of levelling seats was decreased to 40. This was the first election in which Greenland elected members.

== Results ==
Party	Votes	%	Seats	+/–
Denmark proper
Social Democrats	894,913	41.31	74	+13
Venstre	499,656	23.06	42	+9
Conservative People's Party	364,960	16.85	30	+4
Danish Social Liberal Party	169,295	7.81	14	+1
Communist Party of Denmark	93,824	4.33	8	+1
Justice Party of Denmark	75,449	3.48	6	–3
Independent Party	58,573	2.70	0	New
Schleswig Party/Independent	9,721	0.45	1	+1
Total	2,166,391	100.00	175	+26
Valid votes	2,166,391	99.74		
Invalid/blank votes	5,645	0.26		
Total votes	2,172,036	100.00		
Registered voters/turnout	2,695,554	80.58		
Faroe Islands
Social Democratic Party			1	0
Union Party			1	0
Total			2	0
Greenland
Independents	6,183	100.00	2	New
Total	6,183	100.00	2	New
Valid votes	6,183	96.38		
Invalid/blank votes	232	3.62		
Total votes	6,415	100.00		
Registered voters/turnout	9,356	68.57		
Source: Nohlen & Stöver
