= 1950 Danish Folketing election =

Election for the lower house of Danish Parliament

- 5 September 1950
- All 151 seats in the Folketing; 76 seats needed for a majority
- Turnout: 81.87%
Party	Leader	Vote %	Seats	+/–
Social Democrats	Hans Hedtoft	39.59	59	+2
Venstre	Erik Eriksen	21.33	32	−17
Conservatives	Ole Bjørn Kraft	17.78	27	+10
Justice	Oluf Pedersen	8.22	12	+6
Social Liberals	Jørgen Jørgensen	8.18	12	+2
Communists	Aksel Larsen	4.60	7	−2
Elected in the Faroe Islands
Union	Johan Poulsen	46.64	1	0
Social Democratic	Peter Mohr Dam	38.56	1	+1
This lists parties that won seats. See the complete results below.
Prime Minister before	Prime Minister-elect
Hans Hedtoft; Social Democrats	Erik Eriksen; Venstre

Folketing elections were held in Denmark on 5 September 1950, except in the Faroe Islands where they were held on 14 October. The Social Democratic Party remained the largest in the Folketing, with 59 of the 151 seats. Voter turnout was 82% in Denmark proper but just 22% in the Faroes.

== Electoral system changes ==
Following a new electoral law in 1948, the number of levelling seats was increased from 31 to 44 while the number of district seats was decreased from 117 to 105. In total 1 new seat was added.

== Results ==
Party	Votes	%	Seats	+/–
Denmark proper
Social Democrats	813,224	39.59	59	+2
Venstre	438,188	21.33	32	–14
Conservative People's Party	365,236	17.78	27	+10
Justice Party of Denmark	168,784	8.22	12	+6
Danish Social Liberal Party	167,969	8.18	12	+2
Communist Party of Denmark	94,523	4.60	7	–2
Schleswig Party	6,406	0.31	0	0
Total	2,054,330	100.00	149	0
Valid votes	2,054,330	99.73		
Invalid/blank votes	5,614	0.27		
Total votes	2,059,944	100.00		
Registered voters/turnout	2,516,118	81.87		
Faroe Islands
Union Party	1,686	46.64	1	0
Social Democratic Party	1,394	38.56	1	+1
Self-Government	535	14.80	0	0
Total	3,615	100.00	2	0
Valid votes	3,615	99.18		
Invalid/blank votes	30	0.82		
Total votes	3,645	100.00		
Registered voters/turnout	16,584	21.98		
Source: Nohlen & Stöver
