= Minority Party =

Former Danish political party

Party logo

The Minority Party (Danish: Minoritetspartiet) is a former Danish political party that did not gain parliamentary representation.

== History ==
The Minority Party was founded in 2000 by a group of minority groups. One of the party's primus motors were Rune Engelbreth Larsen, who was chairman of the party during the 2005 parliamentary election. Engelbreth Larsen was formerly known as editor of the intellectual left-wing dissident magazine Faklen (The Torch).

During the 2005 election campaign, the Minority Party opposed the consensus among most Danish parties to tighten immigration controls further. The chairman of the party, Rune Engelbreth Larsen, went so far as to call the chairman of the nationalist Danish People's Party a racist.

In the 2005 election, the Minority Party only got 0.3 percent of the votes and did not achieve parliamentary representation. Many saw this as a result of the offensive and confrontational way the party dealt with the Danish People's Party, but mostly that they failed to indicate what they wanted to change or influence in Danish politics. The party did not seek representation in the 2007 election and was formally dissolved by the end of 2007.

== Ideology ==
The party identified itself as humanist and officially rejected both socialism and liberalism. Among its stated goals were social justice and the freedom to be different, to be achieved through economic and humanitarian support for groups considered marginalised (such as the unemployed and immigrants) and embracement of multiculturalism. It specifically did not consider itself a "homeless" or "immigrant" party, but rather a party emphasizing common human dignity.

Socialism was denounced on the grounds that it is potentially totalitarian and suppressive of the diversity of which the party proclaims itself supportive; it considered the notion of a great, suppressed working class archaic. Rather, it thought that the perceived vulnerable parts of society are different from those of the 19th century. Liberalism was rejected by the party, stating that the accompanying freedoms are based around money and greed as opposed to human decency. The party strongly criticised populism and what it perceived as the political right's throwing suspicion on immigrants.

=== Key issues ===
- Guaranteed minimum income: a social benefit for all citizens. The basic income should match to the expenditures of a modest living standard.
- Relaxation of the immigration laws, especially the repeal of the "24-year rule", that makes it impossible for Danish citizens under 24 years to get foreign spouses to Denmark.
- Resistance to the Danish membership of the European Union.
- Resistance to the activation of the unemployed.
- Strengthening of the citizens' legal status against the authorities.
