= Aalborg North (nomination district) =

Electoral district in Denmark

- Aalborg Nord
- Nomination district constituency for the Folketing
- Location of Aalborg North within North Jutland

- Location of North Jutland within Denmark
- Municipalities: Aalborg
- Constituency: North Jutland
- Electorate: 52,978 (2022)

Current constituency
- Created: 1849 (as constituency); 1920 (as nomination district)

Aalborg North nominating district is one of the 92 nominating districts that was created for Danish elections following the 2007 municipal reform. It is one of the nomination districts from Aalborg Municipality, the others being Aalborg East and Aalborg West. It was created in 1849 as a constituency, and has been a nomination district since 1920, though its boundaries have been changed since then. Prior to 1970, it was known as Nørresundby.

In all general elections except 2015, the parties associated with the red bloc has won the most votes, while the Social Democrats has always been party to win the most votes.

== General elections results ==
=== General elections in the 2020s ===
2022 Danish general election

Parties	Vote		
Parties	Votes	%	+ / -
Social Democrats	14,523	33.82	-0.07
Venstre	5,732	13.35	-10.35
Denmark Democrats	4,390	10.22	New
Liberal Alliance	3,928	9.15	+6.33
Moderates	2,924	6.81	New
Green Left	2,776	6.46	+0.24
Red–Green Alliance	1,935	4.51	-1.40
Conservatives	1,628	3.79	-0.35
Social Liberals	1,593	3.71	-2.88
New Right	1,197	2.79	+0.91
The Alternative	1,112	2.59	-0.26
Danish People's Party	817	1.90	-6.18
Independent Greens	203	0.47	New
Christian Democrats	136	0.32	-0.85
Jette Møller	50	0.12	New
Total	42,944		

=== General elections in the 2010s ===
2019 Danish general election

Parties	Vote		
Parties	Votes	%	+ / -
Social Democrats	14,226	33.89	+2.87
Venstre	9,948	23.70	+2.94
Danish People's Party	3,391	8.08	-10.84
Social Liberals	2,766	6.59	+2.59
Green Left	2,610	6.22	+2.57
Red–Green Alliance	2,479	5.91	-1.78
Conservatives	1,739	4.14	+2.02
The Alternative	1,198	2.85	-0.70
Liberal Alliance	1,185	2.82	-4.61
New Right	790	1.88	New
Stram Kurs	770	1.83	New
Christian Democrats	492	1.17	+0.33
Klaus Riskær Pedersen Party	384	0.91	New
Total	41,978		

2015 Danish general election

Parties	Vote		
Parties	Votes	%	+ / -
Social Democrats	12,630	31.02	-0.80
Venstre	8,454	20.76	-2.74
Danish People's Party	7,705	18.92	+7.71
Red–Green Alliance	3,131	7.69	+1.78
Liberal Alliance	3,027	7.43	+2.90
Social Liberals	1,628	4.00	-4.15
Green Left	1,485	3.65	-5.40
The Alternative	1,445	3.55	New
Conservatives	862	2.12	-3.02
Christian Democrats	341	0.84	+0.20
Hans Schultz	10	0.02	-0.03
Total	40,718		

2011 Danish general election

Parties	Vote		
Parties	Votes	%	+ / -
Social Democrats	12,955	31.82	-1.19
Venstre	9,569	23.50	+2.89
Danish People's Party	4,566	11.21	-1.76
Green Left	3,684	9.05	-2.65
Social Liberals	3,318	8.15	+3.68
Red–Green Alliance	2,405	5.91	+4.25
Conservatives	2,092	5.14	-7.55
Liberal Alliance	1,846	4.53	+2.50
Christian Democrats	261	0.64	-0.19
Hans Schultz	22	0.05	+0.04
Total	40,718		

=== General elections in the 2000s ===
2007 Danish general election

Parties	Vote		
Parties	Votes	%	+ / -
Social Democrats	13,032	33.01	-1.85
Venstre	8,135	20.61	-5.16
Danish People's Party	5,118	12.97	+0.46
Conservatives	5,011	12.69	+2.56
Green Left	4,617	11.70	+7.41
Social Liberals	1,763	4.47	-2.63
New Alliance	800	2.03	New
Red–Green Alliance	655	1.66	-0.66
Christian Democrats	328	0.83	-1.13
Anders Gravers Pedersen	12	0.03	New
Hans Schultz	4	0.01	New
Total	39,475		

2005 Danish general election

Parties	Vote		
Parties	Votes	%	+ / -
Social Democrats	13,384	34.86	-0.58
Venstre	9,895	25.77	-3.29
Danish People's Party	4,804	12.51	+0.72
Conservatives	3,888	10.13	+1.54
Social Liberals	2,727	7.10	+3.41
Green Left	1,646	4.29	-0.38
Red–Green Alliance	892	2.32	+0.33
Christian Democrats	754	1.96	-0.66
Centre Democrats	319	0.83	-0.72
Minority Party	78	0.20	New
Christian Jensen	5	0.01	New
Aase Heskjær	3	0.01	New
Ivan Johansen	3	0.01	New
Total	38,398		

2001 Danish general election

Parties	Vote		
Parties	Votes	%	+ / -
Social Democrats	13,910	35.44	-7.88
Venstre	11,407	29.06	+9.96
Danish People's Party	4,627	11.79	+7.88
Conservatives	3,372	8.59	+2.15
Green Left	1,832	4.67	-0.68
Social Liberals	1,449	3.69	+1.19
Christian People's Party	1,029	2.62	+0.42
Red–Green Alliance	780	1.99	+0.31
Centre Democrats	609	1.55	-1.79
Progress Party	232	0.59	-11.23
Total	39,247		

=== General elections in the 1990s ===
1998 Danish general election

Parties	Vote		
Parties	Votes	%	+ / -
Social Democrats	16,945	43.32	+1.01
Venstre	7,472	19.10	-1.73
Progress Party	4,622	11.82	+2.60
Conservatives	2,520	6.44	-5.23
Green Left	2,091	5.35	-0.37
Danish People's Party	1,530	3.91	New
Centre Democrats	1,308	3.34	+0.72
Social Liberals	978	2.50	-1.12
Christian People's Party	862	2.20	+0.25
Red–Green Alliance	657	1.68	-0.32
Democratic Renewal	123	0.31	New
Henrik Westergaard	6	0.02	New
Total	39,114		

1994 Danish general election

Parties	Vote		
Parties	Votes	%	+ / -
Social Democrats	15,868	42.31	-4.52
Venstre	7,812	20.83	+7.14
Conservatives	4,378	11.67	-0.40
Progress Party	3,460	9.22	+1.12
Green Left	2,146	5.72	-0.17
Social Liberals	1,357	3.62	+1.05
Centre Democrats	983	2.62	-2.15
Red–Green Alliance	751	2.00	+1.22
Christian People's Party	732	1.95	-0.37
Steen W. Jakobsen	7	0.02	New
Svend Jensen	7	0.02	New
Henning Sørensen	7	0.02	New
Total	37,508		

1990 Danish general election

Parties	Vote		
Parties	Votes	%	+ / -
Social Democrats	17,323	46.83	+7.87
Venstre	5,065	13.69	+1.68
Conservatives	4,466	12.07	-3.88
Progress Party	2,996	8.10	-0.87
Green Left	2,177	5.89	-3.97
Centre Democrats	1,764	4.77	+0.20
Social Liberals	949	2.57	-1.79
Christian People's Party	857	2.32	-0.02
Common Course	592	1.60	+0.51
Red–Green Alliance	289	0.78	New
The Greens	243	0.66	-0.25
Justice Party of Denmark	131	0.35	New
P. H. Bering	131	0.35	New
Humanist Party	9	0.02	New
Total	36,992		

=== General elections in the 1980s ===
1988 Danish general election

Parties	Vote		
Parties	Votes	%	+ / -
Social Democrats	14,668	38.96	+0.23
Conservatives	6,003	15.95	-1.35
Venstre	4,520	12.01	+0.59
Green Left	3,712	9.86	-1.36
Progress Party	3,377	8.97	+3.76
Centre Democrats	1,721	4.57	+0.34
Social Liberals	1,641	4.36	-0.11
Christian People's Party	880	2.34	-0.18
Common Course	409	1.09	-1.09
The Greens	342	0.91	+0.10
Communist Party of Denmark	253	0.67	-0.01
Left Socialists	120	0.32	-0.30
Total	37,646		

1987 Danish general election

Parties	Vote		
Parties	Votes	%	+ / -
Social Democrats	14,838	38.73	-0.87
Conservatives	6,630	17.30	-3.16
Venstre	4,375	11.42	-1.64
Green Left	4,299	11.22	+1.98
Progress Party	1,998	5.21	+0.82
Social Liberals	1,712	4.47	+4.02
Centre Democrats	1,621	4.23	-1.43
Christian People's Party	967	2.52	-0.92
Common Course	835	2.18	New
The Greens	311	0.81	New
Communist Party of Denmark	261	0.68	+0.09
Left Socialists	237	0.62	-0.90
Justice Party of Denmark	166	0.43	-1.05
Humanist Party	42	0.11	New
Socialist Workers Party	14	0.04	-0.05
Jytte Østerbye	5	0.01	New
Marxist–Leninists Party	3	0.01	-0.01
Total	38,314		

1984 Danish general election

Parties	Vote		
Parties	Votes	%	+ / -
Social Democrats	14,711	39.60	+1.53
Conservatives	7,600	20.46	+10.04
Venstre	4,851	13.06	+0.22
Green Left	3,433	9.24	+0.53
Centre Democrats	2,104	5.66	-4.19
Progress Party	1,632	4.39	-5.53
Christian People's Party	1,279	3.44	+0.49
Left Socialists	564	1.52	+0.27
Justice Party of Denmark	548	1.48	+0.25
Communist Party of Denmark	220	0.59	-0.49
Social Liberals	167	0.45	-3.09
Socialist Workers Party	35	0.09	+0.03
Marxist–Leninists Party	8	0.02	New
Total	37,152		

1981 Danish general election

Parties	Vote		
Parties	Votes	%	+ / -
Social Democrats	13,738	38.07	-3.36
Venstre	4,633	12.84	-1.47
Conservatives	3,760	10.42	+1.01
Progress Party	3,580	9.92	-2.95
Centre Democrats	3,556	9.85	+6.04
Green Left	3,144	8.71	+4.18
Social Liberals	1,278	3.54	-0.32
Christian People's Party	1,066	2.95	-0.37
Left Socialists	452	1.25	-0.78
Justice Party of Denmark	443	1.23	-1.07
Communist Party of Denmark	388	1.08	-0.85
Communist Workers Party	30	0.08	-0.11
Socialist Workers Party	21	0.06	New
Total	36,089		

=== General elections in the 1970s ===
1979 Danish general election

Parties	Vote		
Parties	Votes	%	+ / -
Social Democrats	14,970	41.43	+2.89
Venstre	5,172	14.31	+1.47
Progress Party	4,651	12.87	-2.98
Conservatives	3,399	9.41	+2.44
Green Left	1,638	4.53	+1.93
Social Liberals	1,396	3.86	+0.88
Centre Democrats	1,378	3.81	-3.08
Christian People's Party	1,201	3.32	-1.04
Justice Party of Denmark	832	2.30	-0.49
Left Socialists	733	2.03	+0.70
Communist Party of Denmark	696	1.93	-1.98
Communist Workers Party	68	0.19	New
Total	36,134		

1977 Danish general election

Parties	Vote		
Parties	Votes	%	+ / -
Social Democrats	13,493	38.54	+7.71
Progress Party	5,549	15.85	+0.15
Venstre	4,494	12.84	-11.07
Conservatives	2,439	6.97	+2.61
Centre Democrats	2,413	6.89	+4.44
Christian People's Party	1,525	4.36	-1.72
Communist Party of Denmark	1,370	3.91	-0.30
Social Liberals	1,045	2.98	-3.19
Justice Party of Denmark	978	2.79	+0.99
Green Left	909	2.60	-0.68
Left Socialists	467	1.33	+0.13
Pensioners' Party	329	0.94	New
Total	35,011		

1975 Danish general election

Parties	Vote		
Parties	Votes	%	+ / -
Social Democrats	10,417	30.83	+4.86
Venstre	8,080	23.91	+11.29
Progress Party	5,306	15.70	-2.17
Social Liberals	2,086	6.17	-3.86
Christian People's Party	2,055	6.08	+0.83
Conservatives	1,474	4.36	-4.01
Communist Party of Denmark	1,421	4.21	+0.58
Green Left	1,109	3.28	-1.06
Centre Democrats	827	2.45	-5.94
Justice Party of Denmark	608	1.80	-0.86
Left Socialists	404	1.20	+0.37
Total	33,787		

1973 Danish general election

Parties	Vote		
Parties	Votes	%	+ / -
Social Democrats	8,746	25.97	-13.35
Progress Party	6,019	17.87	New
Venstre	4,251	12.62	-5.22
Social Liberals	3,376	10.03	-2.63
Centre Democrats	2,826	8.39	New
Conservatives	2,819	8.37	-6.97
Christian People's Party	1,767	5.25	+2.60
Green Left	1,461	4.34	-3.35
Communist Party of Denmark	1,222	3.63	+1.77
Justice Party of Denmark	897	2.66	+0.76
Left Socialists	281	0.83	+0.07
Alex Larsen	10	0.03	New
Total	33,675		

1971 Danish general election

Parties	Vote		
Parties	Votes	%	+ / -
Social Democrats	12,158	39.32	+3.16
Venstre	5,515	17.84	-5.11
Conservatives	4,742	15.34	-2.13
Social Liberals	3,914	12.66	-0.11
Green Left	2,377	7.69	+1.39
Christian People's Party	818	2.65	New
Justice Party of Denmark	588	1.90	+1.11
Communist Party of Denmark	576	1.86	+0.50
Left Socialists	234	0.76	-0.32
Total	30,922		

=== General elections in the 1960s ===
1968 Danish general election

Parties	Vote		
Parties	Votes	%	+ / -
Social Democrats	10,527	36.16	-4.64
Venstre	6,682	22.95	+1.39
Conservatives	5,086	17.47	+1.02
Social Liberals	3,718	12.77	+7.17
Green Left	1,835	6.30	-3.71
Communist Party of Denmark	397	1.36	+0.40
Left Socialists	313	1.08	New
Justice Party of Denmark	230	0.79	+0.06
Liberal Centre	164	0.56	-1.22
Independent Party	164	0.56	-1.53
Total	29,116		

1966 Danish general election

Parties	Vote		
Parties	Votes	%	+ / -
Social Democrats	11,635	40.80	-1.78
Venstre	6,149	21.56	-1.04
Conservatives	4,690	16.45	-2.39
Green Left	2,854	10.01	+4.65
Social Liberals	1,598	5.60	+2.45
Independent Party	597	2.09	-1.09
Liberal Centre	507	1.78	New
Communist Party of Denmark	275	0.96	-1.04
Justice Party of Denmark	209	0.73	-0.88
Total	28,514		

1964 Danish general election

Parties	Vote		
Parties	Votes	%	+ / -
Social Democrats	11,167	42.58	+0.52
Venstre	5,927	22.60	-1.73
Conservatives	4,942	18.84	+3.82
Green Left	1,406	5.36	-1.17
Independent Party	834	3.18	-0.67
Social Liberals	827	3.15	-0.40
Communist Party of Denmark	524	2.00	+0.06
Justice Party of Denmark	421	1.61	-1.12
Peace Politics People's Party	92	0.35	New
Danish Unity	85	0.32	New
Total	26,225		

1960 Danish general election

Parties	Vote		
Parties	Votes	%	+ / -
Social Democrats	9,708	42.06	+4.33
Venstre	5,615	24.33	-3.92
Conservatives	3,467	15.02	+1.48
Green Left	1,508	6.53	New
Independent Party	888	3.85	+0.59
Social Liberals	819	3.55	-0.55
Justice Party of Denmark	629	2.73	-5.26
Communist Party of Denmark	448	1.94	-3.19
Total	23,082		

=== General elections in the 1950s ===
1957 Danish general election

Parties	Vote		
Parties	Votes	%	+ / -
Social Democrats	8,090	37.73	-2.64
Venstre	6,057	28.25	-0.06
Conservatives	2,902	13.54	+1.64
Justice Party of Denmark	1,714	7.99	+3.20
Communist Party of Denmark	1,099	5.13	-0.88
Social Liberals	878	4.10	+0.05
Independent Party	699	3.26	-1.31
	0,0		0.00
Total	21,439		

September 1953 Danish Folketing election

Parties	Vote		
Parties	Votes	%	+ / -
Social Democrats	7,637	40.37	+1.12
Venstre	5,355	28.31	+0.06
Conservatives	2,251	11.90	-0.18
Communist Party of Denmark	1,137	6.01	-0.97
Justice Party of Denmark	906	4.79	-3.17
Independent Party	865	4.57	New
Social Liberals	767	4.05	-0.70
Total	18,918		

April 1953 Danish Folketing election

Parties	Vote		
Parties	Votes	%	+ / -
Social Democrats	7,011	39.25	+1.29
Venstre	5,046	28.25	-1.69
Conservatives	2,158	12.08	-0.99
Justice Party of Denmark	1,422	7.96	-1.60
Communist Party of Denmark	1,246	6.98	+1.12
Social Liberals	848	4.75	+1.13
Danish Unity	131	0.73	New
Total	17,862		

1950 Danish Folketing election

Parties	Vote		
Parties	Votes	%	+ / -
Social Democrats	6,856	37.96	-0.98
Venstre	5,407	29.94	-5.90
Conservatives	2,360	13.07	+4.51
Justice Party of Denmark	1,726	9.56	+4.77
Communist Party of Denmark	1,058	5.86	-1.33
Social Liberals	654	3.62	+0.26
Total	18,061		

=== General elections in the 1940s ===
1947 Danish Folketing election

Parties	Vote		
Parties	Votes	%	+ / -
Social Democrats	7,051	38.94	+8.00
Venstre	6,490	35.84	+0.57
Conservatives	1,550	8.56	-2.01
Communist Party of Denmark	1,302	7.19	-7.32
Justice Party of Denmark	867	4.79	+3.45
Social Liberals	608	3.36	-0.19
Danish Unity	238	1.31	-2.51
Total	18,106		

1945 Danish Folketing election

Parties	Vote		
Parties	Votes	%	+ / -
Venstre	6,238	35.27	+6.43
Social Democrats	5,473	30.94	-15.03
Communist Party of Denmark	2,566	14.51	New
Conservatives	1,870	10.57	-4.34
Danish Unity	675	3.82	+2.07
Social Liberals	628	3.55	-0.91
Justice Party of Denmark	237	1.34	+0.19
Total	17,687		

1943 Danish Folketing election

Parties	Vote		
Parties	Votes	%	+ / -
Social Democrats	7,818	45.97	+4.11
Venstre	4,905	28.84	+3.34
Conservatives	2,535	14.91	+3.94
Social Liberals	758	4.46	-0.58
National Socialist Workers' Party of Denmark	496	2.92	+1.09
Danish Unity	298	1.75	+1.60
Justice Party of Denmark	195	1.15	-0.49
Farmers' Party	0	0.00	-9.03
Total	17,005		

=== General elections in the 1930s ===
1939 Danish Folketing election

Parties	Vote		
Parties	Votes	%	+ / -
Social Democrats	5,699	41.86	-1.60
Venstre	3,471	25.50	-8.23
Conservatives	1,493	10.97	+1.14
Farmers' Party	1,229	9.03	+6.03
Social Liberals	686	5.04	-0.11
Communist Party of Denmark	467	3.43	+1.45
National Socialist Workers' Party of Denmark	249	1.83	+1.05
Justice Party of Denmark	223	1.64	-0.42
National Cooperation	76	0.56	New
Danish Unity	21	0.15	New
Total	13,614		

1935 Danish Folketing election

Parties	Vote		
Parties	Votes	%	+ / -
Social Democrats	5,872	43.46	+3.92
Venstre	4,558	33.73	-8.45
Conservatives	1,328	9.83	-0.06
Social Liberals	696	5.15	-0.02
Independent People's Party	406	3.00	New
Justice Party of Denmark	279	2.06	-0.21
Communist Party of Denmark	267	1.98	+1.03
National Socialist Workers' Party of Denmark	106	0.78	New
Total	13,512		

1932 Danish Folketing election

Parties	Vote		
Parties	Votes	%	+ / -
Venstre	5,552	42.18	-8.71
Social Democrats	5,204	39.54	+1.19
Conservatives	1,302	9.89	+5.79
Social Liberals	681	5.17	-0.05
Justice Party of Denmark	299	2.27	+1.20
Communist Party of Denmark	125	0.95	+0.57
	0,0		0.00
Total	13,163		

=== General elections in the 1920s ===
1929 Danish Folketing election

Parties	Vote		
Parties	Votes	%	+ / -
Venstre	6,225	50.89	+7.27
Social Democrats	4,691	38.35	+3.33
Social Liberals	638	5.22	-3.20
Conservatives	502	4.10	-7.50
Justice Party of Denmark	131	1.07	+0.07
Communist Party of Denmark	46	0.38	+0.04
Total	12,233		

1926 Danish Folketing election

Parties	Vote		
Parties	Votes	%	+ / -
Venstre	27,210	43.62	-8.48
Social Democrats	21,849	35.02	+2.40
Conservatives	7,237	11.60	+6.91
Social Liberals	5,255	8.42	-1.01
Justice Party of Denmark	621	1.00	+0.69
Communist Party of Denmark	214	0.34	-0.51
Total	62,386		

1924 Danish Folketing election

Parties	Vote		
Parties	Votes	%	+ / -
Venstre	5,482	52.10	New
Social Democrats	3,432	32.62	-31.76
Social Liberals	992	9.43	-14.28
Conservatives	494	4.69	-6.64
Communist Party of Denmark	89	0.85	New
Justice Party of Denmark	33	0.31	New
Total	10,522		

September 1920 Danish Folketing election

Parties	Vote		
Parties	Votes	%	+ / -
Social Democrats	2,558	64.38	+42.14
Social Liberals	942	23.71	+15.89
Conservatives	450	11.33	+7.31
Industry Party	19	0.48	+0.31
Danish Left Socialist Party	4	0.10	New
Total	3,973		

July 1920 Danish Folketing election

Parties	Vote		
Parties	Votes	%	+ / -
Venstre	4,966	61.28	+1.80
Social Democrats	1,802	22.24	+0.29
Social Liberals	634	7.82	-1.86
Laurits V. Birck	362	4.47	New
Conservatives	326	4.02	-0.53
Industry Party	14	0.17	New
Total	8,104		

April 1920 Danish Folketing election

Parties	Vote	
Parties	Votes	%
Venstre	5,098	59.48
Social Democrats	1,881	21.95
Social Liberals	830	9.68
Conservatives	390	4.55
Centrum	372	4.34
Total	8,571	

== European Parliament elections results ==
2024 European Parliament election in Denmark

Parties	Vote		
Parties	Votes	%	+ / -
Social Democrats	4,818	18.11	-8.59
Green Left	3,878	14.58	+3.45
Venstre	3,665	13.78	-12.75
Denmark Democrats	2,975	11.18	New
Liberal Alliance	2,040	7.67	+5.63
Conservatives	1,891	7.11	+3.35
Red–Green Alliance	1,878	7.06	+1.97
Social Liberals	1,821	6.84	-1.10
Danish People's Party	1,401	5.27	-3.79
Moderates	1,347	5.06	New
The Alternative	891	3.35	-0.17
Total	26,605		

2019 European Parliament election in Denmark

Parties	Vote		
Parties	Votes	%	+ / -
Social Democrats	8,114	26.70	+3.57
Venstre	8,064	26.53	+11.10
Green Left	3,381	11.13	+1.85
Danish People's Party	2,753	9.06	-17.28
Social Liberals	2,412	7.94	+2.55
Red–Green Alliance	1,546	5.09	New
People's Movement against the EU	1,290	4.24	-5.52
Conservatives	1,143	3.76	-3.13
The Alternative	1,069	3.52	New
Liberal Alliance	619	2.04	-1.74
Total	30,391		

2014 European Parliament election in Denmark

Parties	Vote		
Parties	Votes	%	+ / -
Danish People's Party	5,986	26.34	+12.54
Social Democrats	5,256	23.13	-1.94
Venstre	3,506	15.43	-3.44
People's Movement against the EU	2,218	9.76	+2.39
Green Left	2,110	9.28	-6.47
Conservatives	1,566	6.89	-4.65
Social Liberals	1,225	5.39	+1.69
Liberal Alliance	859	3.78	+3.15
Total	22,726		

2009 European Parliament election in Denmark

Parties	Vote		
Parties	Votes	%	+ / -
Social Democrats	6,095	25.07	-10.17
Venstre	4,587	18.87	-4.74
Green Left	3,828	15.75	+10.48
Danish People's Party	3,355	13.80	+6.79
Conservatives	2,806	11.54	+3.67
People's Movement against the EU	1,791	7.37	+2.90
Social Liberals	900	3.70	-0.03
June Movement	796	3.27	-8.22
Liberal Alliance	152	0.63	New
Total	24,310		

2004 European Parliament election in Denmark

Parties	Vote		
Parties	Votes	%	+ / -
Social Democrats	7,172	35.24	+17.98
Venstre	4,804	23.61	-1.82
June Movement	2,339	11.49	-5.04
Conservatives	1,601	7.87	+1.17
Danish People's Party	1,427	7.01	+1.24
Green Left	1,072	5.27	-1.15
People's Movement against the EU	909	4.47	-3.46
Social Liberals	759	3.73	-4.41
Christian Democrats	266	1.31	-1.25
Total	20,349		

1999 European Parliament election in Denmark

Parties	Vote		
Parties	Votes	%	+ / -
Venstre	5,001	25.43	+4.66
Social Democrats	3,394	17.26	-1.44
June Movement	3,250	16.53	+2.85
Social Liberals	1,600	8.14	-0.49
People's Movement against the EU	1,559	7.93	-4.05
Conservatives	1,317	6.70	-7.34
Green Left	1,262	6.42	-0.08
Danish People's Party	1,134	5.77	New
Centre Democrats	644	3.28	+2.35
Christian Democrats	503	2.56	+1.30
Progress Party	308	1.57	-1.94
Total	19,664		

1994 European Parliament election in Denmark

Parties	Vote		
Parties	Votes	%	+ / -
Venstre	4,365	20.77	+4.79
Social Democrats	3,931	18.70	-10.85
Conservatives	2,951	14.04	+3.49
June Movement	2,875	13.68	New
People's Movement against the EU	2,519	11.98	-3.67
Social Liberals	1,814	8.63	+6.28
Green Left	1,366	6.50	-1.44
Progress Party	737	3.51	-3.24
Christian Democrats	265	1.26	-1.82
Centre Democrats	195	0.93	-7.23
Total	21,018		

1989 European Parliament election in Denmark

Parties	Vote		
Parties	Votes	%	+ / -
Social Democrats	5,163	29.55	+6.20
Venstre	2,793	15.98	+2.41
People's Movement against the EU	2,735	15.65	-2.49
Conservatives	1,843	10.55	-7.10
Centre Democrats	1,425	8.16	+1.05
Green Left	1,387	7.94	-0.78
Progress Party	1,179	6.75	+2.27
Christian Democrats	538	3.08	-0.34
Social Liberals	410	2.35	-0.31
Total	17,473		

1984 European Parliament election in Denmark

Parties	Vote	
Parties	Votes	%
Social Democrats	4,746	23.35
People's Movement against the EU	3,688	18.14
Conservatives	3,587	17.65
Venstre	2,758	13.57
Green Left	1,772	8.72
Centre Democrats	1,446	7.11
Progress Party	911	4.48
Christian Democrats	695	3.42
Social Liberals	541	2.66
Left Socialists	182	0.90
Total	20,326	

== Referendums ==
2022 Danish European Union opt-out referendum

Option	Votes	%
✓ YES	20,289	65.34
X NO	10,764	34.66

2015 Danish European Union opt-out referendum

Option	Votes	%
X NO	18,968	58.15
✓ YES	13,649	41.85

2014 Danish Unified Patent Court membership referendum

Option	Votes	%
✓ YES	13,065	58.91
X NO	9,112	41.09

2009 Danish Act of Succession referendum

Option	Votes	%
✓ YES	19,485	84.97
X NO	3,447	15.03

2000 Danish euro referendum

Option	Votes	%
X NO	23,227	58.43
✓ YES	16,525	41.57

1998 Danish Amsterdam Treaty referendum

Option	Votes	%
✓ YES	17,109	52.37
X NO	15,561	47.63

1993 Danish Maastricht Treaty referendum

Option	Votes	%
✓ YES	20,401	53.68
X NO	17,607	46.32

1992 Danish Maastricht Treaty referendum

Option	Votes	%
X NO	19,327	54.34
✓ YES	16,241	45.66

1986 Danish Single European Act referendum

Option	Votes	%
✓ YES	17,445	53.68
X NO	15,053	46.32

1972 Danish European Communities membership referendum

Option	Votes	%
✓ YES	20,937	63.26
X NO	12,162	36.74

1953 Danish constitutional and electoral age referendum

Option	Votes	%
✓ YES	7,885	71.06
X NO	3,212	28.94
23 years	5,920	51.53
21 years	5,569	48.47

1939 Danish constitutional referendum

Option	Votes	%
✓ YES	5,902	89.60
X NO	685	10.40
