= Aalborg West (nomination district) =

Electoral district in Denmark

- Aalborg Vest
- Nomination district constituency for the Folketing
- Location of Aalborg West within North Jutland

- Location of North Jutland within Denmark
- Municipalities: Aalborg (partially)
- Constituency: North Jutland
- Electorate: 50,791 (2022)

Current constituency
- Created: 1915 (as constituency); 1920 (as nomination district)

Aalborg West nominating district is one of the 92 nominating districts that was created for Danish elections following the 2007 municipal reform. It is one of the nomination district from Aalborg Municipality, the others being Aalborg East and Aalborg North It was created in 1915 as a constituency, and has been a nomination district since 1920, though its boundaries have been changed since then.

The general election results has often ended up close to the national results, when looking at the voting distribution between the red and blue bloc. However the Social Democrats has always won the most votes.

== General elections results ==
=== General elections in the 2020s ===
2022 Danish general election

| Parties | Vote | | |
| Parties | Votes | % | + / - |
|---|---|---|---|
| Social Democrats | 13,374 | 31.18 | -0.04 |
| Venstre | 6,309 | 14.71 | -11.93 |
| Liberal Alliance | 4,074 | 9.50 | +6.81 |
| Denmark Democrats | 3,975 | 9.27 | New |
| Moderates | 3,387 | 7.90 | New |
| Green Left | 3,074 | 7.17 | +0.57 |
| Conservatives | 2,169 | 5.06 | -0.21 |
| Red–Green Alliance | 1,769 | 4.12 | -1.53 |
| Social Liberals | 1,728 | 4.03 | -3.23 |
| The Alternative | 1,080 | 2.52 | -0.23 |
| New Right | 1,044 | 2.43 | +0.65 |
| Danish People's Party | 596 | 1.39 | -5.15 |
| Independent Greens | 145 | 0.34 | New |
| Christian Democrats | 125 | 0.29 | -0.90 |
| Jette Møller | 43 | 0.10 | New |
| Total | 42,892 | | |

=== General elections in the 2010s ===
2019 Danish general election

| Parties | Vote | | |
| Parties | Votes | % | + / - |
|---|---|---|---|
| Social Democrats | 12,867 | 31.22 | +2.32 |
| Venstre | 10,979 | 26.64 | +3.02 |
| Social Liberals | 2,994 | 7.26 | +2.90 |
| Green Left | 2,722 | 6.60 | +2.77 |
| Danish People's Party | 2,697 | 6.54 | -9.93 |
| Red–Green Alliance | 2,328 | 5.65 | -1.77 |
| Conservatives | 2,171 | 5.27 | +2.59 |
| The Alternative | 1,134 | 2.75 | -1.17 |
| Liberal Alliance | 1,107 | 2.69 | -5.46 |
| New Right | 734 | 1.78 | New |
| Stram Kurs | 593 | 1.44 | New |
| Christian Democrats | 489 | 1.19 | +0.57 |
| Klaus Riskær Pedersen Party | 401 | 0.97 | New |
| Total | 41,216 | | |

2015 Danish general election

| Parties | Vote | | |
| Parties | Votes | % | + / - |
|---|---|---|---|
| Social Democrats | 11,899 | 28.90 | +0.89 |
| Venstre | 9,728 | 23.62 | -2.85 |
| Danish People's Party | 6,782 | 16.47 | +6.84 |
| Liberal Alliance | 3,356 | 8.15 | +3.30 |
| Red–Green Alliance | 3,055 | 7.42 | +1.66 |
| Social Liberals | 1,796 | 4.36 | -4.73 |
| The Alternative | 1,613 | 3.92 | New |
| Green Left | 1,579 | 3.83 | -5.54 |
| Conservatives | 1,102 | 2.68 | -3.55 |
| Christian Democrats | 255 | 0.62 | +0.05 |
| Hans Schultz | 15 | 0.04 | +0.01 |
| Total | 41,180 | | |

2011 Danish general election

| Parties | Vote | | |
| Parties | Votes | % | + / - |
|---|---|---|---|
| Social Democrats | 11,508 | 28.01 | -0.73 |
| Venstre | 10,875 | 26.47 | +4.36 |
| Danish People's Party | 3,958 | 9.63 | -1.53 |
| Green Left | 3,848 | 9.37 | -2.89 |
| Social Liberals | 3,735 | 9.09 | +3.75 |
| Conservatives | 2,561 | 6.23 | -9.70 |
| Red–Green Alliance | 2,368 | 5.76 | +4.11 |
| Liberal Alliance | 1,991 | 4.85 | +2.72 |
| Christian Democrats | 233 | 0.57 | -0.07 |
| Hans Schultz | 11 | 0.03 | +0.02 |
| Total | 41,088 | | |

=== General elections in the 2000s ===
2007 Danish general election

| Parties | Vote | | |
| Parties | Votes | % | + / - |
|---|---|---|---|
| Social Democrats | 11,472 | 28.74 | +0.09 |
| Venstre | 8,827 | 22.11 | -3.11 |
| Conservatives | 6,360 | 15.93 | +1.95 |
| Green Left | 4,895 | 12.26 | +6.62 |
| Danish People's Party | 4,456 | 11.16 | +1.30 |
| Social Liberals | 2,132 | 5.34 | -5.40 |
| New Alliance | 850 | 2.13 | New |
| Red–Green Alliance | 660 | 1.65 | -1.48 |
| Christian Democrats | 254 | 0.64 | -0.82 |
| Anders Gravers Pedersen | 5 | 0.01 | New |
| Hans Schultz | 5 | 0.01 | New |
| Total | 39,916 | | |

2005 Danish general election

| Parties | Vote | | |
| Parties | Votes | % | + / - |
|---|---|---|---|
| Social Democrats | 9,844 | 28.64 | -0.32 |
| Venstre | 8,667 | 25.22 | -4.29 |
| Conservatives | 4,805 | 13.98 | +3.36 |
| Social Liberals | 3,690 | 10.74 | +4.84 |
| Danish People's Party | 3,388 | 9.86 | -0.32 |
| Green Left | 1,939 | 5.64 | -1.22 |
| Red–Green Alliance | 1,076 | 3.13 | +0.16 |
| Christian Democrats | 503 | 1.46 | -0.83 |
| Centre Democrats | 369 | 1.07 | -1.25 |
| Minority Party | 64 | 0.19 | New |
| Aase Heskjær | 14 | 0.04 | New |
| Christian Jensen | 4 | 0.01 | New |
| Ivan Johansen | 4 | 0.01 | New |
| Total | 34,367 | | |

2001 Danish general election

| Parties | Vote | | |
| Parties | Votes | % | + / - |
|---|---|---|---|
| Venstre | 10,131 | 29.51 | +9.32 |
| Social Democrats | 9,941 | 28.96 | -8.00 |
| Conservatives | 3,646 | 10.62 | +0.77 |
| Danish People's Party | 3,493 | 10.18 | +6.73 |
| Green Left | 2,356 | 6.86 | -1.04 |
| Social Liberals | 2,024 | 5.90 | +1.81 |
| Red–Green Alliance | 1,019 | 2.97 | +0.31 |
| Centre Democrats | 798 | 2.32 | -1.51 |
| Christian People's Party | 785 | 2.29 | +0.58 |
| Progress Party | 134 | 0.39 | -8.64 |
| Total | 34,327 | | |

=== General elections in the 1990s ===
1998 Danish general election

| Parties | Vote | | |
| Parties | Votes | % | + / - |
|---|---|---|---|
| Social Democrats | 12,700 | 36.96 | +1.18 |
| Venstre | 6,936 | 20.19 | -0.58 |
| Conservatives | 3,386 | 9.85 | -7.20 |
| Progress Party | 3,104 | 9.03 | +2.19 |
| Green Left | 2,716 | 7.90 | +0.40 |
| Social Liberals | 1,407 | 4.09 | -0.64 |
| Centre Democrats | 1,316 | 3.83 | +0.94 |
| Danish People's Party | 1,184 | 3.45 | New |
| Red–Green Alliance | 915 | 2.66 | -0.26 |
| Christian People's Party | 588 | 1.71 | +0.25 |
| Democratic Renewal | 101 | 0.29 | New |
| Henrik Westergaard | 8 | 0.02 | New |
| Total | 34,361 | | |

1994 Danish general election

| Parties | Vote | | |
| Parties | Votes | % | + / - |
|---|---|---|---|
| Social Democrats | 11,900 | 35.78 | -4.68 |
| Venstre | 6,909 | 20.77 | +8.10 |
| Conservatives | 5,671 | 17.05 | -0.80 |
| Green Left | 2,493 | 7.50 | -0.67 |
| Progress Party | 2,274 | 6.84 | +0.37 |
| Social Liberals | 1,573 | 4.73 | +1.28 |
| Red–Green Alliance | 972 | 2.92 | +1.38 |
| Centre Democrats | 962 | 2.89 | -1.48 |
| Christian People's Party | 487 | 1.46 | -0.53 |
| Svend Jensen | 7 | 0.02 | New |
| Steen W. Jakobsen | 6 | 0.02 | New |
| Henning Sørensen | 3 | 0.01 | New |
| Total | 33,257 | | |

1990 Danish general election

| Parties | Vote | | |
| Parties | Votes | % | + / - |
|---|---|---|---|
| Social Democrats | 12,980 | 40.46 | +7.20 |
| Conservatives | 5,728 | 17.85 | -3.92 |
| Venstre | 4,065 | 12.67 | +3.73 |
| Green Left | 2,621 | 8.17 | -4.55 |
| Progress Party | 2,077 | 6.47 | -0.81 |
| Centre Democrats | 1,402 | 4.37 | +0.06 |
| Social Liberals | 1,107 | 3.45 | -1.67 |
| Christian People's Party | 639 | 1.99 | +0.18 |
| Red–Green Alliance | 493 | 1.54 | New |
| Common Course | 415 | 1.29 | -0.93 |
| The Greens | 281 | 0.88 | -0.26 |
| Justice Party of Denmark | 142 | 0.44 | New |
| P. H. Bering | 126 | 0.39 | New |
| Humanist Party | 8 | 0.02 | New |
| Total | 32,084 | | |

=== General elections in the 1980s ===
1988 Danish general election

| Parties | Vote | | |
| Parties | Votes | % | + / - |
|---|---|---|---|
| Social Democrats | 10,980 | 33.26 | -0.28 |
| Conservatives | 7,186 | 21.77 | -1.77 |
| Green Left | 4,201 | 12.72 | -1.48 |
| Venstre | 2,950 | 8.94 | +1.86 |
| Progress Party | 2,405 | 7.28 | +3.21 |
| Social Liberals | 1,692 | 5.12 | -0.30 |
| Centre Democrats | 1,424 | 4.31 | +0.07 |
| Common Course | 732 | 2.22 | +0.36 |
| Christian People's Party | 598 | 1.81 | -0.39 |
| The Greens | 377 | 1.14 | +0.08 |
| Communist Party of Denmark | 257 | 0.78 | -0.02 |
| Left Socialists | 213 | 0.65 | -0.66 |
| Total | 33,015 | | |

1987 Danish general election

| Parties | Vote | | |
| Parties | Votes | % | + / - |
|---|---|---|---|
| Social Democrats | 11,097 | 33.54 | -1.29 |
| Conservatives | 7,788 | 23.54 | -1.37 |
| Green Left | 4,699 | 14.20 | +2.99 |
| Venstre | 2,344 | 7.08 | -1.50 |
| Social Liberals | 1,794 | 5.42 | +1.00 |
| Centre Democrats | 1,404 | 4.24 | -1.06 |
| Progress Party | 1,346 | 4.07 | +1.04 |
| Christian People's Party | 727 | 2.20 | -0.43 |
| Common Course | 615 | 1.86 | New |
| Left Socialists | 434 | 1.31 | -1.54 |
| The Greens | 350 | 1.06 | New |
| Communist Party of Denmark | 264 | 0.80 | +0.01 |
| Justice Party of Denmark | 145 | 0.44 | -0.90 |
| Humanist Party | 47 | 0.14 | New |
| Marxist–Leninists Party | 13 | 0.04 | +0.02 |
| Socialist Workers Party | 11 | 0.03 | -0.05 |
| Jytte Østerbye | 7 | 0.02 | New |
| Total | 33,085 | | |

1984 Danish general election

| Parties | Vote | | |
| Parties | Votes | % | + / - |
|---|---|---|---|
| Social Democrats | 11,660 | 34.83 | -1.19 |
| Conservatives | 8,339 | 24.91 | +8.53 |
| Green Left | 3,752 | 11.21 | -0.24 |
| Venstre | 2,873 | 8.58 | +1.06 |
| Centre Democrats | 1,773 | 5.30 | -4.37 |
| Social Liberals | 1,481 | 4.42 | +0.89 |
| Progress Party | 1,013 | 3.03 | -4.94 |
| Left Socialists | 954 | 2.85 | +0.37 |
| Christian People's Party | 879 | 2.63 | +0.40 |
| Justice Party of Denmark | 450 | 1.34 | 0.00 |
| Communist Party of Denmark | 264 | 0.79 | -0.48 |
| Socialist Workers Party | 28 | 0.08 | +0.03 |
| Marxist–Leninists Party | 8 | 0.02 | New |
| Total | 33,474 | | |

1981 Danish general election

| Parties | Vote | | |
| Parties | Votes | % | + / - |
|---|---|---|---|
| Social Democrats | 11,225 | 36.02 | -4.86 |
| Conservatives | 5,104 | 16.38 | +1.28 |
| Green Left | 3,568 | 11.45 | +5.61 |
| Centre Democrats | 3,012 | 9.67 | +6.07 |
| Progress Party | 2,485 | 7.97 | -2.32 |
| Venstre | 2,344 | 7.52 | -2.08 |
| Social Liberals | 1,101 | 3.53 | -0.60 |
| Left Socialists | 772 | 2.48 | -1.15 |
| Christian People's Party | 694 | 2.23 | -0.21 |
| Justice Party of Denmark | 419 | 1.34 | -1.04 |
| Communist Party of Denmark | 397 | 1.27 | -0.57 |
| Communist Workers Party | 24 | 0.08 | -0.19 |
| Socialist Workers Party | 15 | 0.05 | New |
| Total | 31,160 | | |

=== General elections in the 1970s ===
1979 Danish general election

| Parties | Vote | | |
| Parties | Votes | % | + / - |
|---|---|---|---|
| Social Democrats | 13,065 | 40.88 | -0.71 |
| Conservatives | 4,827 | 15.10 | +3.15 |
| Progress Party | 3,289 | 10.29 | -2.54 |
| Venstre | 3,070 | 9.60 | +0.19 |
| Green Left | 1,868 | 5.84 | +2.00 |
| Social Liberals | 1,319 | 4.13 | +1.31 |
| Left Socialists | 1,159 | 3.63 | +1.06 |
| Centre Democrats | 1,151 | 3.60 | -3.25 |
| Christian People's Party | 781 | 2.44 | -1.00 |
| Justice Party of Denmark | 760 | 2.38 | -0.74 |
| Communist Party of Denmark | 588 | 1.84 | +1.23 |
| Communist Workers Party | 86 | 0.27 | New |
| Total | 31,963 | | |

1977 Danish general election

| Parties | Vote | | |
| Parties | Votes | % | + / - |
|---|---|---|---|
| Social Democrats | 12,671 | 41.59 | +7.73 |
| Progress Party | 3,908 | 12.83 | +0.03 |
| Conservatives | 3,642 | 11.95 | +4.54 |
| Venstre | 2,868 | 9.41 | -12.70 |
| Centre Democrats | 2,086 | 6.85 | +5.00 |
| Green Left | 1,169 | 3.84 | -0.42 |
| Christian People's Party | 1,047 | 3.44 | -0.87 |
| Justice Party of Denmark | 951 | 3.12 | +1.38 |
| Social Liberals | 860 | 2.82 | -2.73 |
| Left Socialists | 782 | 2.57 | +0.85 |
| Pensioners' Party | 300 | 0.98 | New |
| Communist Party of Denmark | 185 | 0.61 | -3.78 |
| Total | 30,469 | | |

1975 Danish general election

| Parties | Vote | | |
| Parties | Votes | % | + / - |
|---|---|---|---|
| Social Democrats | 10,772 | 33.86 | +4.40 |
| Venstre | 7,033 | 22.11 | +13.44 |
| Progress Party | 4,072 | 12.80 | -3.50 |
| Conservatives | 2,358 | 7.41 | -4.92 |
| Social Liberals | 1,766 | 5.55 | -3.68 |
| Communist Party of Denmark | 1,396 | 4.39 | +0.59 |
| Christian People's Party | 1,372 | 4.31 | +0.18 |
| Green Left | 1,354 | 4.26 | -1.41 |
| Centre Democrats | 587 | 1.85 | -4.54 |
| Justice Party of Denmark | 552 | 1.74 | -1.32 |
| Left Socialists | 548 | 1.72 | +0.80 |
| Total | 31,810 | | |

1973 Danish general election

| Parties | Vote | | |
| Parties | Votes | % | + / - |
|---|---|---|---|
| Social Democrats | 9,535 | 29.46 | -10.69 |
| Progress Party | 5,275 | 16.30 | New |
| Conservatives | 3,990 | 12.33 | -10.58 |
| Social Liberals | 2,988 | 9.23 | -2.78 |
| Venstre | 2,807 | 8.67 | -0.81 |
| Centre Democrats | 2,067 | 6.39 | New |
| Green Left | 1,836 | 5.67 | -3.11 |
| Christian People's Party | 1,337 | 4.13 | +2.11 |
| Communist Party of Denmark | 1,231 | 3.80 | +2.20 |
| Justice Party of Denmark | 990 | 3.06 | +0.88 |
| Left Socialists | 299 | 0.92 | +0.05 |
| Alex Larsen | 14 | 0.04 | New |
| Total | 32,369 | | |

1971 Danish general election

| Parties | Vote | | |
| Parties | Votes | % | + / - |
|---|---|---|---|
| Social Democrats | 12,623 | 40.15 | +1.16 |
| Conservatives | 7,204 | 22.91 | -5.17 |
| Social Liberals | 3,777 | 12.01 | +1.23 |
| Venstre | 2,982 | 9.48 | -0.40 |
| Green Left | 2,760 | 8.78 | +1.39 |
| Justice Party of Denmark | 687 | 2.18 | +1.56 |
| Christian People's Party | 635 | 2.02 | New |
| Communist Party of Denmark | 502 | 1.60 | +0.10 |
| Left Socialists | 272 | 0.87 | -0.33 |
| Total | 31,442 | | |

=== General elections in the 1960s ===
1968 Danish general election

| Parties | Vote | | |
| Parties | Votes | % | + / - |
|---|---|---|---|
| Social Democrats | 11,347 | 38.99 | -3.66 |
| Conservatives | 8,170 | 28.08 | +1.17 |
| Social Liberals | 3,138 | 10.78 | +6.31 |
| Venstre | 2,875 | 9.88 | +0.93 |
| Green Left | 2,151 | 7.39 | -4.82 |
| Communist Party of Denmark | 436 | 1.50 | +0.59 |
| Liberal Centre | 364 | 1.25 | -0.95 |
| Left Socialists | 350 | 1.20 | New |
| Justice Party of Denmark | 179 | 0.62 | +0.07 |
| Independent Party | 89 | 0.31 | -0.83 |
| Total | 29,099 | | |

1966 Danish general election

| Parties | Vote | | |
| Parties | Votes | % | + / - |
|---|---|---|---|
| Social Democrats | 12,226 | 42.65 | -4.12 |
| Conservatives | 7,715 | 26.91 | -1.77 |
| Green Left | 3,500 | 12.21 | +5.68 |
| Venstre | 2,566 | 8.95 | -0.21 |
| Social Liberals | 1,281 | 4.47 | +2.05 |
| Liberal Centre | 632 | 2.20 | New |
| Independent Party | 327 | 1.14 | -1.36 |
| Communist Party of Denmark | 260 | 0.91 | -1.00 |
| Justice Party of Denmark | 159 | 0.55 | -0.72 |
| Total | 28,666 | | |

1964 Danish general election

| Parties | Vote | | |
| Parties | Votes | % | + / - |
|---|---|---|---|
| Social Democrats | 13,049 | 46.77 | -0.62 |
| Conservatives | 8,003 | 28.68 | +1.75 |
| Venstre | 2,555 | 9.16 | +0.79 |
| Green Left | 1,822 | 6.53 | -1.10 |
| Independent Party | 697 | 2.50 | -0.75 |
| Social Liberals | 675 | 2.42 | +0.25 |
| Communist Party of Denmark | 532 | 1.91 | +0.20 |
| Justice Party of Denmark | 354 | 1.27 | -1.27 |
| Danish Unity | 111 | 0.40 | New |
| Peace Politics People's Party | 105 | 0.38 | New |
| Total | 27,903 | | |

1960 Danish general election

| Parties | Vote | | |
| Parties | Votes | % | + / - |
|---|---|---|---|
| Social Democrats | 12,653 | 47.39 | +1.44 |
| Conservatives | 7,190 | 26.93 | +2.42 |
| Venstre | 2,236 | 8.37 | -2.81 |
| Green Left | 2,038 | 7.63 | New |
| Independent Party | 867 | 3.25 | +0.97 |
| Justice Party of Denmark | 679 | 2.54 | -5.61 |
| Social Liberals | 580 | 2.17 | -1.46 |
| Communist Party of Denmark | 456 | 1.71 | -2.59 |
| Total | 26,699 | | |

=== General elections in the 1950s ===
1957 Danish general election

| Parties | Vote | | |
| Parties | Votes | % | + / - |
|---|---|---|---|
| Social Democrats | 11,446 | 45.95 | -3.09 |
| Conservatives | 6,105 | 24.51 | -1.90 |
| Venstre | 2,786 | 11.18 | +1.19 |
| Justice Party of Denmark | 2,030 | 8.15 | +4.95 |
| Communist Party of Denmark | 1,072 | 4.30 | -0.80 |
| Social Liberals | 905 | 3.63 | +0.45 |
| Independent Party | 567 | 2.28 | -0.79 |
| | 0,0 | | 0.00 |
| Total | 24,911 | | |

September 1953 Danish Folketing election

| Parties | Vote | | |
| Parties | Votes | % | + / - |
|---|---|---|---|
| Social Democrats | 11,462 | 49.04 | +1.99 |
| Conservatives | 6,173 | 26.41 | -0.13 |
| Venstre | 2,334 | 9.99 | +1.17 |
| Communist Party of Denmark | 1,193 | 5.10 | -1.43 |
| Justice Party of Denmark | 748 | 3.20 | -2.87 |
| Social Liberals | 743 | 3.18 | -0.85 |
| Independent Party | 718 | 3.07 | New |
| Total | 23,371 | | |

April 1953 Danish Folketing election

| Parties | Vote | | |
| Parties | Votes | % | + / - |
|---|---|---|---|
| Social Democrats | 10,493 | 47.05 | -0.89 |
| Conservatives | 5,919 | 26.54 | -1.72 |
| Venstre | 1,967 | 8.82 | +1.64 |
| Communist Party of Denmark | 1,457 | 6.53 | +1.39 |
| Justice Party of Denmark | 1,353 | 6.07 | -2.49 |
| Social Liberals | 899 | 4.03 | +1.11 |
| Danish Unity | 215 | 0.96 | New |
| Total | 22,303 | | |

1950 Danish Folketing election

| Parties | Vote | | |
| Parties | Votes | % | + / - |
|---|---|---|---|
| Social Democrats | 10,526 | 47.94 | -1.57 |
| Conservatives | 6,206 | 28.26 | +6.75 |
| Justice Party of Denmark | 1,880 | 8.56 | +3.37 |
| Venstre | 1,576 | 7.18 | -4.78 |
| Communist Party of Denmark | 1,128 | 5.14 | -2.30 |
| Social Liberals | 641 | 2.92 | +0.60 |
| Total | 21,957 | | |

=== General elections in the 1940s ===
1947 Danish Folketing election

| Parties | Vote | | |
| Parties | Votes | % | + / - |
|---|---|---|---|
| Social Democrats | 10,697 | 49.51 | +13.05 |
| Conservatives | 4,648 | 21.51 | -6.01 |
| Venstre | 2,584 | 11.96 | +2.92 |
| Communist Party of Denmark | 1,608 | 7.44 | -9.62 |
| Justice Party of Denmark | 1,121 | 5.19 | +4.02 |
| Social Liberals | 502 | 2.32 | -0.71 |
| Danish Unity | 447 | 2.07 | -3.65 |
| Total | 21,607 | | |

1945 Danish Folketing election

| Parties | Vote | | |
| Parties | Votes | % | + / - |
|---|---|---|---|
| Social Democrats | 7,890 | 36.46 | -15.87 |
| Conservatives | 5,956 | 27.52 | -7.59 |
| Communist Party of Denmark | 3,692 | 17.06 | New |
| Venstre | 1,956 | 9.04 | +5.53 |
| Danish Unity | 1,237 | 5.72 | +3.21 |
| Social Liberals | 655 | 3.03 | +0.05 |
| Justice Party of Denmark | 253 | 1.17 | +0.47 |
| Total | 21,639 | | |

1943 Danish Folketing election

| Parties | Vote | | |
| Parties | Votes | % | + / - |
|---|---|---|---|
| Social Democrats | 11,539 | 52.33 | -0.48 |
| Conservatives | 7,742 | 35.11 | +5.39 |
| Venstre | 774 | 3.51 | -0.51 |
| Social Liberals | 658 | 2.98 | -2.52 |
| National Socialist Workers' Party of Denmark | 587 | 2.66 | +0.83 |
| Danish Unity | 554 | 2.51 | +2.09 |
| Justice Party of Denmark | 155 | 0.70 | +0.06 |
| Farmers' Party | 40 | 0.18 | -0.22 |
| Total | 22,049 | | |

=== General elections in the 1930s ===
1939 Danish Folketing election

| Parties | Vote | | |
| Parties | Votes | % | + / - |
|---|---|---|---|
| Social Democrats | 8,766 | 52.81 | -6.58 |
| Conservatives | 4,934 | 29.72 | +3.63 |
| Social Liberals | 913 | 5.50 | -0.04 |
| Venstre | 667 | 4.02 | -0.63 |
| Communist Party of Denmark | 625 | 3.77 | +1.25 |
| National Socialist Workers' Party of Denmark | 303 | 1.83 | +1.15 |
| National Cooperation | 151 | 0.91 | New |
| Justice Party of Denmark | 106 | 0.64 | -0.23 |
| Danish Unity | 69 | 0.42 | New |
| Farmers' Party | 66 | 0.40 | +0.14 |
| Total | 16,600 | | |

1935 Danish Folketing election

| Parties | Vote | | |
| Parties | Votes | % | + / - |
|---|---|---|---|
| Social Democrats | 8,991 | 59.39 | +2.77 |
| Conservatives | 3,950 | 26.09 | +2.33 |
| Social Liberals | 838 | 5.54 | +1.66 |
| Venstre | 704 | 4.65 | -8.63 |
| Communist Party of Denmark | 381 | 2.52 | +1.49 |
| Justice Party of Denmark | 132 | 0.87 | -0.55 |
| National Socialist Workers' Party of Denmark | 103 | 0.68 | New |
| Independent People's Party | 39 | 0.26 | New |
| Total | 15,138 | | |

1932 Danish Folketing election

| Parties | Vote | | |
| Parties | Votes | % | + / - |
|---|---|---|---|
| Social Democrats | 7,232 | 56.62 | +0.61 |
| Conservatives | 3,035 | 23.76 | +8.66 |
| Venstre | 1,696 | 13.28 | -11.13 |
| Social Liberals | 496 | 3.88 | +0.35 |
| Justice Party of Denmark | 182 | 1.42 | +0.70 |
| Communist Party of Denmark | 132 | 1.03 | +0.80 |
| | 0,0 | | 0.00 |
| Total | 12,773 | | |

=== General elections in the 1920s ===
1929 Danish Folketing election

| Parties | Vote | | |
| Parties | Votes | % | + / - |
|---|---|---|---|
| Social Democrats | 6,437 | 56.01 | +1.53 |
| Venstre | 2,805 | 24.41 | +10.48 |
| Conservatives | 1,735 | 15.10 | -11.07 |
| Social Liberals | 406 | 3.53 | -1.09 |
| Justice Party of Denmark | 83 | 0.72 | +0.45 |
| Communist Party of Denmark | 27 | 0.23 | -0.30 |
| Total | 11,493 | | |

1926 Danish Folketing election

| Parties | Vote | | |
| Parties | Votes | % | + / - |
|---|---|---|---|
| Social Democrats | 5,873 | 54.48 | -0.50 |
| Conservatives | 2,821 | 26.17 | +9.29 |
| Venstre | 1,502 | 13.93 | -7.28 |
| Social Liberals | 498 | 4.62 | -1.51 |
| Communist Party of Denmark | 57 | 0.53 | -0.11 |
| Justice Party of Denmark | 29 | 0.27 | +0.11 |
| Total | 10,780 | | |

1924 Danish Folketing election

| Parties | Vote | | |
| Parties | Votes | % | + / - |
|---|---|---|---|
| Social Democrats | 5,465 | 54.98 | -11.59 |
| Venstre | 2,108 | 21.21 | New |
| Conservatives | 1,678 | 16.88 | -9.13 |
| Social Liberals | 609 | 6.13 | -0.26 |
| Communist Party of Denmark | 64 | 0.64 | New |
| Justice Party of Denmark | 16 | 0.16 | New |
| Total | 9,940 | | |

September 1920 Danish Folketing election

| Parties | Vote | | |
| Parties | Votes | % | + / - |
|---|---|---|---|
| Social Democrats | 4,835 | 66.57 | +18.77 |
| Conservatives | 1,889 | 26.01 | +6.35 |
| Social Liberals | 464 | 6.39 | +2.57 |
| Industry Party | 49 | 0.67 | -0.01 |
| Danish Left Socialist Party | 26 | 0.36 | New |
| Total | 7,263 | | |

July 1920 Danish Folketing election

| Parties | Vote | | |
| Parties | Votes | % | + / - |
|---|---|---|---|
| Social Democrats | 3,637 | 47.80 | +0.45 |
| Conservatives | 1,496 | 19.66 | +5.16 |
| Laurits V. Birck | 1,213 | 15.94 | New |
| Venstre | 919 | 12.08 | -5.38 |
| Social Liberals | 291 | 3.82 | -1.97 |
| Industry Party | 52 | 0.68 | New |
| Total | 7,608 | | |

April 1920 Danish Folketing election

| Parties | Vote | |
| Parties | Votes | % |
|---|---|---|
| Social Democrats | 3,906 | 47.35 |
| Venstre | 1,440 | 17.46 |
| Centrum | 1,229 | 14.90 |
| Conservatives | 1,196 | 14.50 |
| Social Liberals | 478 | 5.79 |
| Total | 8,249 | |

== European Parliament elections results ==
2024 European Parliament election in Denmark

| Parties | Vote | | |
| Parties | Votes | % | + / - |
|---|---|---|---|
| Social Democrats | 4,710 | 16.52 | -8.03 |
| Green Left | 4,410 | 15.47 | +3.85 |
| Venstre | 4,315 | 15.14 | -13.96 |
| Denmark Democrats | 2,890 | 10.14 | New |
| Conservatives | 2,308 | 8.10 | +3.37 |
| Liberal Alliance | 2,226 | 7.81 | +5.79 |
| Social Liberals | 2,082 | 7.30 | -1.39 |
| Red–Green Alliance | 2,046 | 7.18 | +2.42 |
| Moderates | 1,612 | 5.65 | New |
| Danish People's Party | 1,136 | 3.99 | -3.72 |
| The Alternative | 771 | 2.70 | -0.46 |
| Total | 28,506 | | |

2019 European Parliament election in Denmark

| Parties | Vote | | |
| Parties | Votes | % | + / - |
|---|---|---|---|
| Venstre | 9,128 | 29.10 | +11.94 |
| Social Democrats | 7,701 | 24.55 | +2.88 |
| Green Left | 3,644 | 11.62 | +1.52 |
| Social Liberals | 2,725 | 8.69 | +2.64 |
| Danish People's Party | 2,418 | 7.71 | -15.90 |
| Red–Green Alliance | 1,493 | 4.76 | New |
| Conservatives | 1,484 | 4.73 | -4.05 |
| People's Movement against the EU | 1,153 | 3.68 | -5.18 |
| The Alternative | 991 | 3.16 | New |
| Liberal Alliance | 633 | 2.02 | -1.74 |
| Total | 31,370 | | |

2014 European Parliament election in Denmark

| Parties | Vote | | |
| Parties | Votes | % | + / - |
|---|---|---|---|
| Danish People's Party | 5,776 | 23.61 | +11.36 |
| Social Democrats | 5,302 | 21.67 | -0.92 |
| Venstre | 4,199 | 17.16 | -2.93 |
| Green Left | 2,471 | 10.10 | -6.62 |
| People's Movement against the EU | 2,167 | 8.86 | +2.48 |
| Conservatives | 2,148 | 8.78 | -5.09 |
| Social Liberals | 1,480 | 6.05 | +2.06 |
| Liberal Alliance | 920 | 3.76 | +3.12 |
| Total | 24,463 | | |

2009 European Parliament election in Denmark

| Parties | Vote | | |
| Parties | Votes | % | + / - |
|---|---|---|---|
| Social Democrats | 5,793 | 22.59 | -8.96 |
| Venstre | 5,151 | 20.09 | +0.10 |
| Green Left | 4,287 | 16.72 | +8.62 |
| Conservatives | 3,556 | 13.87 | +2.18 |
| Danish People's Party | 3,142 | 12.25 | +6.79 |
| People's Movement against the EU | 1,637 | 6.38 | +1.71 |
| Social Liberals | 1,023 | 3.99 | -2.61 |
| June Movement | 890 | 3.47 | -7.34 |
| Liberal Alliance | 165 | 0.64 | New |
| Total | 25,644 | | |

2004 European Parliament election in Denmark

| Parties | Vote | | |
| Parties | Votes | % | + / - |
|---|---|---|---|
| Social Democrats | 5,987 | 31.55 | +16.29 |
| Venstre | 3,794 | 19.99 | -3.50 |
| Conservatives | 2,218 | 11.69 | +1.57 |
| June Movement | 2,052 | 10.81 | -5.53 |
| Green Left | 1,538 | 8.10 | +0.44 |
| Social Liberals | 1,253 | 6.60 | -3.89 |
| Danish People's Party | 1,037 | 5.46 | +0.47 |
| People's Movement against the EU | 887 | 4.67 | -1.82 |
| Christian Democrats | 212 | 1.12 | -0.44 |
| Total | 18,978 | | |

1999 European Parliament election in Denmark

| Parties | Vote | | |
| Parties | Votes | % | + / - |
|---|---|---|---|
| Venstre | 4,258 | 23.49 | +6.08 |
| June Movement | 2,962 | 16.34 | +1.27 |
| Social Democrats | 2,767 | 15.26 | +0.10 |
| Social Liberals | 1,902 | 10.49 | +1.05 |
| Conservatives | 1,835 | 10.12 | -10.32 |
| Green Left | 1,388 | 7.66 | -0.18 |
| People's Movement against the EU | 1,176 | 6.49 | -3.90 |
| Danish People's Party | 905 | 4.99 | New |
| Centre Democrats | 654 | 3.61 | +2.66 |
| Christian Democrats | 282 | 1.56 | +0.79 |
| Progress Party | 156 | 0.86 | -1.68 |
| Total | 18,129 | | |

1994 European Parliament election in Denmark

| Parties | Vote | | |
| Parties | Votes | % | + / - |
|---|---|---|---|
| Conservatives | 4,106 | 20.44 | +4.36 |
| Venstre | 3,497 | 17.41 | +4.54 |
| Social Democrats | 3,045 | 15.16 | -9.64 |
| June Movement | 3,028 | 15.07 | New |
| People's Movement against the EU | 2,087 | 10.39 | -8.18 |
| Social Liberals | 1,896 | 9.44 | +7.05 |
| Green Left | 1,575 | 7.84 | -1.08 |
| Progress Party | 511 | 2.54 | -2.97 |
| Centre Democrats | 191 | 0.95 | -7.54 |
| Christian Democrats | 154 | 0.77 | -1.60 |
| Total | 20,090 | | |

1989 European Parliament election in Denmark

| Parties | Vote | | |
| Parties | Votes | % | + / - |
|---|---|---|---|
| Social Democrats | 4,147 | 24.80 | +3.38 |
| People's Movement against the EU | 3,106 | 18.57 | -0.56 |
| Conservatives | 2,689 | 16.08 | -9.11 |
| Venstre | 2,152 | 12.87 | +5.33 |
| Green Left | 1,492 | 8.92 | -1.11 |
| Centre Democrats | 1,420 | 8.49 | +1.59 |
| Progress Party | 922 | 5.51 | +2.31 |
| Social Liberals | 399 | 2.39 | -0.12 |
| Christian Democrats | 396 | 2.37 | -0.09 |
| Total | 16,723 | | |

1984 European Parliament election in Denmark

| Parties | Vote | |
| Parties | Votes | % |
|---|---|---|
| Conservatives | 4,785 | 25.19 |
| Social Democrats | 4,068 | 21.42 |
| People's Movement against the EU | 3,633 | 19.13 |
| Green Left | 1,906 | 10.03 |
| Venstre | 1,433 | 7.54 |
| Centre Democrats | 1,311 | 6.90 |
| Progress Party | 607 | 3.20 |
| Social Liberals | 477 | 2.51 |
| Christian Democrats | 468 | 2.46 |
| Left Socialists | 307 | 1.62 |
| Total | 18,995 | |

== Referendums ==
2022 Danish European Union opt-out referendum

| Option | Votes | % |
|---|---|---|
| ✓ YES | 21,855 | 69.04 |
| X NO | 9,801 | 30.96 |

2015 Danish European Union opt-out referendum

| Option | Votes | % |
|---|---|---|
| X NO | 17,371 | 52.43 |
| ✓ YES | 15,759 | 47.57 |

2014 Danish Unified Patent Court membership referendum

| Option | Votes | % |
|---|---|---|
| ✓ YES | 14,711 | 61.62 |
| X NO | 9,162 | 38.38 |

2009 Danish Act of Succession referendum

| Option | Votes | % |
|---|---|---|
| ✓ YES | 20,585 | 85.92 |
| X NO | 3,372 | 14.08 |

2000 Danish euro referendum

| Option | Votes | % |
|---|---|---|
| X NO | 17,692 | 50.54 |
| ✓ YES | 17,317 | 49.46 |

1998 Danish Amsterdam Treaty referendum

| Option | Votes | % |
|---|---|---|
| ✓ YES | 17,015 | 58.06 |
| X NO | 12,293 | 41.94 |

1993 Danish Maastricht Treaty referendum

| Option | Votes | % |
|---|---|---|
| ✓ YES | 19,583 | 57.39 |
| X NO | 14,541 | 42.61 |

1992 Danish Maastricht Treaty referendum

| Option | Votes | % |
|---|---|---|
| ✓ YES | 16,003 | 50.02 |
| X NO | 15,991 | 49.98 |

1986 Danish Single European Act referendum

| Option | Votes | % |
|---|---|---|
| ✓ YES | 15,364 | 53.90 |
| X NO | 13,142 | 46.10 |

1972 Danish European Communities membership referendum

| Option | Votes | % |
|---|---|---|
| ✓ YES | 20,869 | 63.23 |
| X NO | 12,138 | 36.77 |

1953 Danish constitutional and electoral age referendum

| Option | Votes | % |
|---|---|---|
| ✓ YES | 11,158 | 70.78 |
| X NO | 4,606 | 29.22 |
| 21 years | 8,240 | 50.56 |
| 23 years | 8,058 | 49.44 |

1939 Danish constitutional referendum

| Option | Votes | % |
|---|---|---|
| ✓ YES | 11,909 | 94.64 |
| X NO | 674 | 5.36 |
