= Aalborg East (nomination district) =

Electoral district in Denmark

- Aalborg Øst
- Nomination district constituency for the Folketing
- Location of Aalborg East within North Jutland

- Location of North Jutland within Denmark
- Municipalities: Aalborg
- Constituency: North Jutland
- Electorate: 64,511 (2022)

Current constituency
- Created: 1915 (as constituency); 1920 (as nomination district)

Aalborg East nominating district is one of the 92 nominating districts that was created for Danish elections following the 2007 municipal reform. It is one of the nominating districts from Aalborg Municipality, the others being Aalborg West and Aalborg North. It was created in 1915 as a constituency, and has been a nomination district since 1920, though its boundaries have been changed since then.

In all general elections, since it was created, it has been the nominating district where parties commonly associated with the red bloc of Danish politics has received the highest vote share of any located in the North Jutland folketing constituency.

== General elections results ==
=== General elections in the 2020s ===
2022 Danish general election

Parties	Vote		
Parties	Votes	%	+ / -
Social Democrats	18,201	34.60	-0.24
Venstre	6,139	11.67	-9.48
Liberal Alliance	4,718	8.97	+6.32
Denmark Democrats	4,694	8.92	New
Green Left	3,881	7.38	+0.34
Moderates	3,712	7.06	New
Red–Green Alliance	2,508	4.77	-1.63
Social Liberals	2,300	4.37	-3.49
Conservatives	2,109	4.01	+0.08
The Alternative	1,611	3.06	-0.15
New Right	1,250	2.38	+0.76
Danish People's Party	789	1.50	-5.43
Independent Greens	395	0.75	New
Christian Democrats	232	0.44	-1.13
Jette Møller	62	0.12	New
Total	52,601		

=== General elections in the 2010s ===
2019 Danish general election

Parties	Vote		
Parties	Votes	%	+ / -
Social Democrats	17,918	34.84	+2.70
Venstre	10,880	21.15	+3.27
Social Liberals	4,040	7.86	+3.24
Green Left	3,620	7.04	+2.77
Danish People's Party	3,564	6.93	-10.93
Red–Green Alliance	3,291	6.40	-2.29
Conservatives	2,020	3.93	+1.96
The Alternative	1,650	3.21	-0.77
Liberal Alliance	1,365	2.65	-4.75
Stram Kurs	930	1.81	New
New Right	835	1.62	New
Christian Democrats	805	1.57	+0.41
Klaus Riskær Pedersen Party	513	1.00	New
Total	51,431		

2015 Danish general election

Parties	Vote		
Parties	Votes	%	+ / -
Social Democrats	15,854	32.14	-0.75
Venstre	8,820	17.88	-2.65
Danish People's Party	8,807	17.86	+7.46
Red–Green Alliance	4,284	8.69	+2.03
Liberal Alliance	3,651	7.40	+3.12
Social Liberals	2,278	4.62	-4.08
Green Left	2,108	4.27	-6.86
The Alternative	1,964	3.98	New
Conservatives	974	1.97	-2.66
Christian Democrats	572	1.16	+0.43
Hans Schultz	9	0.02	-0.03
Total	49,321		

2011 Danish general election

Parties	Vote		
Parties	Votes	%	+ / -
Social Democrats	15,895	32.89	-1.70
Venstre	9,924	20.53	+2.26
Green Left	5,378	11.13	-2.08
Danish People's Party	5,025	10.40	-2.35
Social Liberals	4,205	8.70	+3.98
Red–Green Alliance	3,220	6.66	+4.94
Conservatives	2,240	4.63	-7.14
Liberal Alliance	2,069	4.28	+2.20
Christian Democrats	351	0.73	-0.12
Hans Schultz	26	0.05	+0.05
Total	48,333		

=== General elections in the 2000s ===
2007 Danish general election

Parties	Vote		
Parties	Votes	%	+ / -
Social Democrats	16,081	34.59	-0.20
Venstre	8,492	18.27	-2.79
Green Left	6,140	13.21	+7.26
Danish People's Party	5,928	12.75	+1.73
Conservatives	5,471	11.77	+1.46
Social Liberals	2,195	4.72	-5.46
New Alliance	965	2.08	New
Red–Green Alliance	801	1.72	-1.63
Christian Democrats	393	0.85	-1.02
Anders Gravers Pedersen	21	0.05	New
Hans Schultz	2	0.00	New
Total	46,489		

2005 Danish general election

Parties	Vote		
Parties	Votes	%	+ / -
Social Democrats	15,985	34.79	-0.30
Venstre	9,677	21.06	-4.43
Danish People's Party	5,061	11.01	-0.01
Conservatives	4,739	10.31	+2.00
Social Liberals	4,677	10.18	+4.62
Green Left	2,732	5.95	-0.59
Red–Green Alliance	1,538	3.35	+0.35
Christian Democrats	861	1.87	-0.55
Centre Democrats	506	1.10	-1.04
Minority Party	149	0.32	New
Aase Heskjær	19	0.04	New
Ivan Johansen	2	0.00	New
Christian Jensen	1	0.00	New
Total	45,947		

2001 Danish general election

Parties	Vote		
Parties	Votes	%	+ / -
Social Democrats	16,325	35.09	-8.95
Venstre	11,859	25.49	+8.91
Danish People's Party	5,128	11.02	+7.14
Conservatives	3,868	8.31	+1.74
Green Left	3,044	6.54	-1.26
Social Liberals	2,587	5.56	+1.85
Red–Green Alliance	1,394	3.00	+0.44
Christian People's Party	1,127	2.42	+0.46
Centre Democrats	995	2.14	-1.60
Progress Party	202	0.43	-8.37
Total	46,529		

=== General elections in the 1990s ===
1998 Danish general election

Parties	Vote		
Parties	Votes	%	+ / -
Social Democrats	20,696	44.04	+0.35
Venstre	7,790	16.58	-0.38
Progress Party	4,134	8.80	+1.86
Green Left	3,663	7.80	-0.55
Conservatives	3,087	6.57	-5.13
Danish People's Party	1,825	3.88	New
Centre Democrats	1,758	3.74	+0.85
Social Liberals	1,744	3.71	-1.00
Red–Green Alliance	1,203	2.56	-0.45
Christian People's Party	921	1.96	+0.24
Democratic Renewal	145	0.31	New
Henrik Westergaard	23	0.05	New
Total	46,989		

1994 Danish general election

Parties	Vote		
Parties	Votes	%	+ / -
Social Democrats	19,901	43.69	-6.41
Venstre	7,726	16.96	+7.51
Conservatives	5,329	11.70	-0.10
Green Left	3,803	8.35	-0.82
Progress Party	3,161	6.94	+0.94
Social Liberals	2,146	4.71	+1.75
Red–Green Alliance	1,370	3.01	+1.56
Centre Democrats	1,317	2.89	-0.98
Christian People's Party	782	1.72	-0.09
Svend Jensen	8	0.02	New
Henning Sørensen	4	0.01	New
Steen W. Jakobsen	3	0.01	New
Total	45,550		

1990 Danish general election

Parties	Vote		
Parties	Votes	%	+ / -
Social Democrats	22,193	50.10	+7.00
Conservatives	5,228	11.80	-3.36
Venstre	4,186	9.45	+2.90
Green Left	4,061	9.17	-5.17
Progress Party	2,658	6.00	-0.79
Centre Democrats	1,715	3.87	+0.29
Social Liberals	1,310	2.96	-1.92
Christian People's Party	801	1.81	+0.12
Common Course	782	1.77	+0.47
Red–Green Alliance	642	1.45	New
The Greens	358	0.81	-0.26
P. H. Bering	192	0.43	New
Justice Party of Denmark	164	0.37	New
Humanist Party	7	0.02	New
Total	44,297		

=== General elections in the 1980s ===
1988 Danish general election

Parties	Vote		
Parties	Votes	%	+ / -
Social Democrats	19,247	43.10	+0.42
Conservatives	6,769	15.16	-0.59
Green Left	6,406	14.34	-1.87
Progress Party	3,034	6.79	+2.97
Venstre	2,925	6.55	+1.20
Social Liberals	2,178	4.88	+0.08
Centre Democrats	1,598	3.58	+0.09
Christian People's Party	754	1.69	-0.08
Common Course	582	1.30	-1.21
The Greens	478	1.07	+0.16
Communist Party of Denmark	429	0.96	+0.12
Left Socialists	261	0.58	-0.60
Total	44,661		

1987 Danish general election

Parties	Vote		
Parties	Votes	%	+ / -
Social Democrats	19,530	42.68	-1.91
Green Left	7,418	16.21	+3.15
Conservatives	7,207	15.75	-1.93
Venstre	2,449	5.35	-0.96
Social Liberals	2,196	4.80	+0.71
Progress Party	1,750	3.82	+1.00
Centre Democrats	1,598	3.49	-0.74
Common Course	1,148	2.51	New
Christian People's Party	808	1.77	-0.28
Left Socialists	540	1.18	-1.66
The Greens	418	0.91	New
Communist Party of Denmark	384	0.84	+0.06
Justice Party of Denmark	187	0.41	-1.01
Humanist Party	62	0.14	New
Marxist–Leninists Party	25	0.05	+0.01
Socialist Workers Party	24	0.05	-0.05
Jytte Østerbye	14	0.03	New
Total	45,758		

1984 Danish general election

Parties	Vote		
Parties	Votes	%	+ / -
Social Democrats	20,067	44.59	+1.03
Conservatives	7,957	17.68	+5.73
Green Left	5,877	13.06	-0.15
Venstre	2,839	6.31	+0.82
Centre Democrats	1,905	4.23	-3.81
Social Liberals	1,843	4.09	+0.82
Left Socialists	1,279	2.84	+0.46
Progress Party	1,268	2.82	-4.50
Christian People's Party	922	2.05	+0.31
Justice Party of Denmark	638	1.42	+0.12
Communist Party of Denmark	349	0.78	-0.77
Socialist Workers Party	45	0.10	+0.01
Marxist–Leninists Party	19	0.04	New
Total	45,008		

1981 Danish general election

Parties	Vote		
Parties	Votes	%	+ / -
Social Democrats	18,426	43.56	-5.77
Green Left	5,589	13.21	+6.26
Conservatives	5,054	11.95	+3.13
Centre Democrats	3,402	8.04	+5.14
Progress Party	3,095	7.32	-2.39
Venstre	2,321	5.49	-1.66
Social Liberals	1,384	3.27	-0.59
Left Socialists	1,007	2.38	-1.46
Christian People's Party	738	1.74	-0.27
Communist Party of Denmark	656	1.55	-1.12
Justice Party of Denmark	549	1.30	-1.07
Communist Workers Party	43	0.10	-0.29
Socialist Workers Party	37	0.09	New
Total	42,301		

=== General elections in the 1970s ===
1979 Danish general election

Parties	Vote		
Parties	Votes	%	+ / -
Social Democrats	20,589	49.33	+1.23
Progress Party	4,051	9.71	-1.94
Conservatives	3,681	8.82	+2.30
Venstre	2,983	7.15	+0.64
Green Left	2,900	6.95	+2.62
Social Liberals	1,613	3.86	+1.58
Left Socialists	1,604	3.84	+1.14
Centre Democrats	1,211	2.90	-2.63
Communist Party of Denmark	1,114	2.67	-3.11
Justice Party of Denmark	990	2.37	-0.45
Christian People's Party	839	2.01	-0.70
Communist Workers Party	163	0.39	New
Total	41,738		

1977 Danish general election

Parties	Vote		
Parties	Votes	%	+ / -
Social Democrats	19,574	48.10	+6.65
Progress Party	4,743	11.65	-0.72
Conservatives	2,655	6.52	+2.32
Venstre	2,649	6.51	-9.71
Communist Party of Denmark	2,354	5.78	-0.70
Centre Democrats	2,252	5.53	+3.96
Green Left	1,761	4.33	-1.04
Justice Party of Denmark	1,149	2.82	+1.09
Christian People's Party	1,104	2.71	-1.20
Left Socialists	1,098	2.70	+1.07
Social Liberals	926	2.28	-2.80
Pensioners' Party	432	1.06	New
Total	40,697		

1975 Danish general election

Parties	Vote		
Parties	Votes	%	+ / -
Social Democrats	16,347	41.45	+6.31
Venstre	6,397	16.22	+9.78
Progress Party	4,878	12.37	-2.96
Communist Party of Denmark	2,554	6.48	+1.01
Green Left	2,117	5.37	-1.76
Social Liberals	2,002	5.08	-3.42
Conservatives	1,656	4.20	-3.30
Christian People's Party	1,541	3.91	+0.48
Justice Party of Denmark	684	1.73	-1.31
Left Socialists	642	1.63	+0.57
Centre Democrats	621	1.57	-5.35
Total	39,439		

1973 Danish general election

Parties	Vote		
Parties	Votes	%	+ / -
Social Democrats	14,015	35.14	-13.96
Progress Party	6,113	15.33	New
Social Liberals	3,391	8.50	-2.58
Conservatives	2,993	7.50	-6.61
Green Left	2,844	7.13	-4.22
Centre Democrats	2,760	6.92	New
Venstre	2,569	6.44	-1.30
Communist Party of Denmark	2,182	5.47	+3.36
Christian People's Party	1,368	3.43	+1.87
Justice Party of Denmark	1,212	3.04	+1.14
Left Socialists	424	1.06	+0.02
Alex Larsen	13	0.03	New
Total	39,884		

1971 Danish general election

Parties	Vote		
Parties	Votes	%	+ / -
Social Democrats	18,853	49.10	+1.87
Conservatives	5,418	14.11	-4.00
Green Left	4,359	11.35	+1.02
Social Liberals	4,254	11.08	-0.13
Venstre	2,972	7.74	+0.06
Communist Party of Denmark	811	2.11	+0.27
Justice Party of Denmark	729	1.90	+1.31
Christian People's Party	599	1.56	New
Left Socialists	400	1.04	-0.64
Total	38,395		

=== General elections in the 1960s ===
1968 Danish general election

Parties	Vote		
Parties	Votes	%	+ / -
Social Democrats	15,224	47.23	-3.03
Conservatives	5,838	18.11	+0.96
Social Liberals	3,612	11.21	+6.55
Green Left	3,331	10.33	-5.66
Venstre	2,477	7.68	+0.45
Communist Party of Denmark	593	1.84	+0.52
Left Socialists	540	1.68	New
Liberal Centre	351	1.09	-0.90
Justice Party of Denmark	189	0.59	-0.04
Independent Party	79	0.25	-0.51
Total	32,234		

1966 Danish general election

Parties	Vote		
Parties	Votes	%	+ / -
Social Democrats	16,012	50.26	-5.28
Conservatives	5,464	17.15	-2.15
Green Left	5,094	15.99	+7.50
Venstre	2,303	7.23	-0.33
Social Liberals	1,483	4.66	+2.58
Liberal Centre	635	1.99	New
Communist Party of Denmark	420	1.32	-1.52
Independent Party	243	0.76	-1.37
Justice Party of Denmark	202	0.63	-0.74
Total	31,856		

1964 Danish general election

Parties	Vote		
Parties	Votes	%	+ / -
Social Democrats	16,504	55.54	-0.77
Conservatives	5,735	19.30	+2.65
Green Left	2,522	8.49	-1.48
Venstre	2,247	7.56	-0.06
Communist Party of Denmark	844	2.84	+0.40
Independent Party	632	2.13	-0.11
Social Liberals	619	2.08	+0.18
Justice Party of Denmark	408	1.37	-1.48
Peace Politics People's Party	101	0.34	New
Danish Unity	101	0.34	New
Total	29,713		

1960 Danish general election

Parties	Vote		
Parties	Votes	%	+ / -
Social Democrats	14,935	56.31	-1.20
Conservatives	4,417	16.65	+2.00
Green Left	2,645	9.97	New
Venstre	2,021	7.62	-1.60
Justice Party of Denmark	757	2.85	-5.20
Communist Party of Denmark	647	2.44	-3.00
Independent Party	595	2.24	+0.61
Social Liberals	505	1.90	-1.60
Total	26,522		

=== General elections in the 1950s ===
1957 Danish general election

Parties	Vote		
Parties	Votes	%	+ / -
Social Democrats	14,177	57.51	-2.53
Conservatives	3,612	14.65	-1.96
Venstre	2,273	9.22	+0.59
Justice Party of Denmark	1,984	8.05	+5.08
Communist Party of Denmark	1,340	5.44	-1.56
Social Liberals	864	3.50	+0.54
Independent Party	402	1.63	-0.16
	0,0		0.00
Total	24,652		

September 1953 Danish Folketing election

Parties	Vote		
Parties	Votes	%	+ / -
Social Democrats	13,678	60.04	+2.59
Conservatives	3,784	16.61	+0.68
Venstre	1,966	8.63	+0.77
Communist Party of Denmark	1,594	7.00	-1.92
Justice Party of Denmark	677	2.97	-2.31
Social Liberals	675	2.96	-0.79
Independent Party	407	1.79	New
Total	22,781		

April 1953 Danish Folketing election

Parties	Vote		
Parties	Votes	%	+ / -
Social Democrats	12,520	57.45	-1.05
Conservatives	3,472	15.93	-1.22
Communist Party of Denmark	1,943	8.92	+1.50
Venstre	1,712	7.86	+0.79
Justice Party of Denmark	1,151	5.28	-2.11
Social Liberals	818	3.75	+1.28
Danish Unity	176	0.81	New
Total	21,792		

1950 Danish Folketing election

Parties	Vote		
Parties	Votes	%	+ / -
Social Democrats	12,473	58.50	-1.16
Conservatives	3,657	17.15	+5.15
Communist Party of Denmark	1,581	7.42	-2.86
Justice Party of Denmark	1,576	7.39	+3.83
Venstre	1,508	7.07	-3.73
Social Liberals	526	2.47	+0.58
Total	21,321		

=== General elections in the 1940s ===
1947 Danish Folketing election

Parties	Vote		
Parties	Votes	%	+ / -
Social Democrats	12,688	59.66	+17.44
Conservatives	2,552	12.00	-4.72
Venstre	2,298	10.80	+1.53
Communist Party of Denmark	2,186	10.28	-13.38
Justice Party of Denmark	757	3.56	+2.65
Social Liberals	403	1.89	-0.74
Danish Unity	384	1.81	-2.78
Total	21,268		

1945 Danish Folketing election

Parties	Vote		
Parties	Votes	%	+ / -
Social Democrats	8,619	42.22	-21.47
Communist Party of Denmark	4,830	23.66	New
Conservatives	3,413	16.72	-6.35
Venstre	1,892	9.27	+3.91
Danish Unity	937	4.59	+2.87
Social Liberals	537	2.63	-0.24
Justice Party of Denmark	186	0.91	+0.30
Total	20,414		

1943 Danish Folketing election

Parties	Vote		
Parties	Votes	%	+ / -
Social Democrats	12,418	63.69	+0.40
Conservatives	4,498	23.07	+5.98
Venstre	1,046	5.36	-0.39
Social Liberals	559	2.87	-1.20
National Socialist Workers' Party of Denmark	419	2.15	+0.49
Danish Unity	336	1.72	+1.34
Justice Party of Denmark	118	0.61	+0.02
Farmers' Party	105	0.54	-0.66
Total	19,499		

=== General elections in the 1930s ===
1939 Danish Folketing election

Parties	Vote		
Parties	Votes	%	+ / -
Social Democrats	9,752	63.29	-3.70
Conservatives	2,633	17.09	+0.64
Venstre	886	5.75	-1.04
Communist Party of Denmark	849	5.51	+2.12
Social Liberals	627	4.07	-0.52
National Socialist Workers' Party of Denmark	256	1.66	+1.07
Farmers' Party	185	1.20	+0.66
Justice Party of Denmark	91	0.59	-0.07
National Cooperation	70	0.45	New
Danish Unity	59	0.38	New
Total	15,408		

1935 Danish Folketing election

Parties	Vote		
Parties	Votes	%	+ / -
Social Democrats	10,265	66.99	+4.79
Conservatives	2,521	16.45	-0.90
Venstre	1,041	6.79	-7.25
Social Liberals	703	4.59	+0.92
Communist Party of Denmark	519	3.39	+1.69
Justice Party of Denmark	101	0.66	-0.37
National Socialist Workers' Party of Denmark	91	0.59	New
Independent People's Party	82	0.54	New
Total	15,323		

1932 Danish Folketing election

Parties	Vote		
Parties	Votes	%	+ / -
Social Democrats	8,610	62.20	+1.45
Conservatives	2,402	17.35	+6.67
Venstre	1,944	14.04	-9.38
Social Liberals	508	3.67	-0.38
Communist Party of Denmark	236	1.70	+1.22
Justice Party of Denmark	143	1.03	+0.42
	0,0		0.00
Total	13,843		

=== General elections in the 1920s ===
1929 Danish Folketing election

Parties	Vote		
Parties	Votes	%	+ / -
Social Democrats	7,409	60.75	+2.11
Venstre	2,856	23.42	+7.08
Conservatives	1,303	10.68	-8.18
Social Liberals	494	4.05	-1.18
Justice Party of Denmark	74	0.61	+0.37
Communist Party of Denmark	59	0.48	-0.22
Total	12,195		

1926 Danish Folketing election

Parties	Vote		
Parties	Votes	%	+ / -
Social Democrats	6,897	58.64	+1.28
Conservatives	2,218	18.86	+7.54
Venstre	1,922	16.34	-7.65
Social Liberals	615	5.23	-0.88
Communist Party of Denmark	82	0.70	-0.38
Justice Party of Denmark	28	0.24	+0.08
Total	11,762		

1924 Danish Folketing election

Parties	Vote		
Parties	Votes	%	+ / -
Social Democrats	5,918	57.36	-13.27
Venstre	2,475	23.99	New
Conservatives	1,168	11.32	-8.31
Social Liberals	630	6.11	-2.19
Communist Party of Denmark	111	1.08	New
Justice Party of Denmark	16	0.16	New
Total	10,318		

September 1920 Danish Folketing election

Parties	Vote		
Parties	Votes	%	+ / -
Social Democrats	5,054	70.63	+22.36
Conservatives	1,405	19.63	+5.80
Social Liberals	594	8.30	+3.98
Industry Party	65	0.91	+0.01
Danish Left Socialist Party	38	0.53	New
Total	7,156		

July 1920 Danish Folketing election

Parties	Vote		
Parties	Votes	%	+ / -
Social Democrats	3,702	48.27	+1.34
Venstre	1,401	18.27	+6.49
Laurits V. Birck	1,105	14.41	New
Conservatives	1,061	13.83	-5.91
Social Liberals	331	4.32	-0.16
Industry Party	69	0.90	New
Total	7,669		

April 1920 Danish Folketing election

Parties	Vote	
Parties	Votes	%
Social Democrats	3,872	46.93
Conservatives	1,629	19.74
Centrum	1,408	17.06
Venstre	972	11.78
Social Liberals	370	4.48
Total	8,251	

== European Parliament elections results ==
2024 European Parliament election in Denmark

Parties	Vote		
Parties	Votes	%	+ / -
Social Democrats	5,973	17.90	-10.14
Green Left	5,605	16.80	+4.29
Venstre	3,957	11.86	-11.15
Denmark Democrats	3,276	9.82	New
Social Liberals	2,753	8.25	-0.92
Conservatives	2,584	7.74	+4.12
Red–Green Alliance	2,478	7.43	+1.92
Liberal Alliance	2,402	7.20	+5.09
Danish People's Party	1,594	4.78	-3.52
Moderates	1,544	4.63	New
The Alternative	1,204	3.61	-0.03
Total	33,370		

2019 European Parliament election in Denmark

Parties	Vote		
Parties	Votes	%	+ / -
Social Democrats	10,622	28.04	+3.80
Venstre	8,716	23.01	+9.45
Green Left	4,739	12.51	+1.81
Social Liberals	3,473	9.17	+2.98
Danish People's Party	3,145	8.30	-16.99
Red–Green Alliance	2,086	5.51	New
People's Movement against the EU	1,551	4.09	-5.93
The Alternative	1,377	3.64	New
Conservatives	1,370	3.62	-3.01
Liberal Alliance	800	2.11	-1.27
Total	37,879		

2014 European Parliament election in Denmark

Parties	Vote		
Parties	Votes	%	+ / -
Danish People's Party	7,135	25.29	+11.78
Social Democrats	6,839	24.24	-1.60
Venstre	3,827	13.56	-2.20
Green Left	3,018	10.70	-7.43
People's Movement against the EU	2,826	10.02	+2.54
Conservatives	1,870	6.63	-4.22
Social Liberals	1,747	6.19	+2.08
Liberal Alliance	955	3.38	+2.75
Total	28,217		

2009 European Parliament election in Denmark

Parties	Vote		
Parties	Votes	%	+ / -
Social Democrats	7,433	25.84	-10.28
Green Left	5,217	18.13	+9.91
Venstre	4,533	15.76	-0.88
Danish People's Party	3,886	13.51	+7.56
Conservatives	3,121	10.85	+2.70
People's Movement against the EU	2,153	7.48	+2.44
Social Liberals	1,183	4.11	-2.40
June Movement	1,061	3.69	-8.26
Liberal Alliance	182	0.63	New
Total	28,769		

2004 European Parliament election in Denmark

Parties	Vote		
Parties	Votes	%	+ / -
Social Democrats	8,716	36.12	+17.81
Venstre	4,017	16.64	-3.76
June Movement	2,885	11.95	-6.52
Green Left	1,984	8.22	-0.11
Conservatives	1,967	8.15	+1.56
Social Liberals	1,571	6.51	-3.04
Danish People's Party	1,437	5.95	+0.29
People's Movement against the EU	1,216	5.04	-2.05
Christian Democrats	341	1.41	-0.72
Total	24,134		

1999 European Parliament election in Denmark

Parties	Vote		
Parties	Votes	%	+ / -
Venstre	4,790	20.40	+5.09
June Movement	4,336	18.47	+1.36
Social Democrats	4,299	18.31	-0.55
Social Liberals	2,242	9.55	+0.51
Green Left	1,957	8.33	-1.00
People's Movement against the EU	1,664	7.09	-5.04
Conservatives	1,547	6.59	-7.08
Danish People's Party	1,330	5.66	New
Centre Democrats	816	3.48	+2.53
Christian Democrats	499	2.13	+1.21
Progress Party	246	1.05	-1.62
Total	23,480		

1994 European Parliament election in Denmark

Parties	Vote		
Parties	Votes	%	+ / -
Social Democrats	4,879	18.86	-13.06
June Movement	4,426	17.11	New
Venstre	3,961	15.31	+5.98
Conservatives	3,537	13.67	+3.31
People's Movement against the EU	3,138	12.13	-9.71
Green Left	2,415	9.33	-1.54
Social Liberals	2,340	9.04	+6.66
Progress Party	690	2.67	-2.43
Centre Democrats	247	0.95	-5.37
Christian Democrats	239	0.92	-0.96
Total	25,872		

1989 European Parliament election in Denmark

Parties	Vote		
Parties	Votes	%	+ / -
Social Democrats	6,879	31.92	+4.63
People's Movement against the EU	4,706	21.84	-0.62
Green Left	2,343	10.87	-2.30
Conservatives	2,232	10.36	-5.77
Venstre	2,010	9.33	+2.79
Centre Democrats	1,363	6.32	+0.90
Progress Party	1,099	5.10	+2.00
Social Liberals	512	2.38	-0.02
Christian Democrats	406	1.88	-0.03
Total	21,550		

1984 European Parliament election in Denmark

Parties	Vote	
Parties	Votes	%
Social Democrats	6,505	27.29
People's Movement against the EU	5,354	22.46
Conservatives	3,846	16.13
Green Left	3,139	13.17
Venstre	1,559	6.54
Centre Democrats	1,292	5.42
Progress Party	740	3.10
Social Liberals	571	2.40
Christian Democrats	455	1.91
Left Socialists	379	1.59
Total	23,840	

== Referendums ==
2022 Danish European Union opt-out referendum

Option	Votes	%
✓ YES	25,578	66.32
X NO	12,987	33.68

2015 Danish European Union opt-out referendum

Option	Votes	%
X NO	23,275	58.27
✓ YES	16,666	41.73

2014 Danish Unified Patent Court membership referendum

Option	Votes	%
✓ YES	15,766	56.84
X NO	11,972	43.16

2009 Danish Act of Succession referendum

Option	Votes	%
✓ YES	22,795	84.68
X NO	4,123	15.32

2000 Danish euro referendum

Option	Votes	%
X NO	26,999	56.09
✓ YES	21,132	43.91

1998 Danish Amsterdam Treaty referendum

Option	Votes	%
✓ YES	20,959	52.38
X NO	19,053	47.62

1993 Danish Maastricht Treaty referendum

Option	Votes	%
✓ YES	23,711	50.85
X NO	22,920	49.15

1992 Danish Maastricht Treaty referendum

Option	Votes	%
X NO	25,119	57.38
✓ YES	18,655	42.62

1986 Danish Single European Act referendum

Option	Votes	%
X NO	22,004	57.56
✓ YES	16,221	42.44

1972 Danish European Communities membership referendum

Option	Votes	%
✓ YES	22,463	55.45
X NO	18,050	44.55

1953 Danish constitutional and electoral age referendum

Option	Votes	%
✓ YES	10,976	72.13
X NO	4,242	27.87
21 years	9,382	58.93
23 years	6,538	41.07

1939 Danish constitutional referendum

Option	Votes	%
✓ YES	11,676	96.31
X NO	447	3.69
