= Copenhagen County (Folketing constituency) =

Former electoral district in Denmark (1920-2006)

Copenhagen County Københavns Amtskreds
- Electoral district
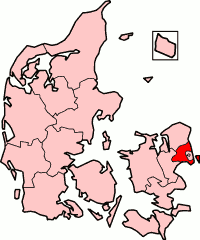
- Copenhagen County in Denmark
- Country: Denmark

Population
  - Total: 444,739 (electorate in '05)

The Copenhagen County District (Danish: Københavns Amtskreds) was an electoral district for the Danish parliament (Folketing) from 1920 to 2006. The county constituency consisted of Copenhagen County. The constituency was dissolved in the structural reform of 2007. Most of the area is now in the Greater Copenhagen constituency. However, the Amager district was transferred to the Copenhagen constituency, while three former municipalities to the north were transferred to the North Zealand constituency.

The county district was divided into the following constituencies, with their constituent municipalities in parentheses:

- Gentofte district (consisting of the part of Gentofte Municipality that lies west of a line from the municipal border through Lyngbyvej, Bernstorffsvej, Femvejen and Vilvordevej and from there northwest along Klampenborgvej to the municipal border)
- Lyngby district (consisting of Lyngby-Taarbæk and Søllerød municipalities)
- Ballerup district (consisting of Ballerup, Ledøje-Smørum, and Værløse municipalities)
- Glostrup district (consisting of Albertslund, Glostrup, Høje-Taastrup, Ishøj, and Vallensbæk municipalities)
- Hellerup district (consisting of the part of Gentofte Municipality that lies east of a line from the municipal border through Lyngbyvej, Bernstorffsvej, Femvejen and Vilvordevej and from here northwest along Klampenborgvej to the municipal border)
- Gladsaxe district (consisting of Gladsaxe Municipality)
- Hvidovre district (consisting of Brøndby and Hvidovre municipalities)
- Amager district (consisting of Dragør and Tårnby municipalities)
- Rødovre district (consisting of Herlev and Rødovre municipalities)

== Election results 1971-2005 ==
=== 2005 election ===
At the 2005 Danish general election, there were 444,739 eligible voters in the Copenhagen County constituency. The district was awarded 20 mandates, including 6 additional mandates. The turnout was 85.81%.

Party	Votes	Percentage	+/-	Mandates	+/-	Elected MPs
Social Democrats	96,266	25.4	-3.6	5	-	Mogens Lykketoft (K) Mette Frederiksen (K) Karen Hækkerup (K) Morten Bødskov (K) Per Kaalund (T)
Venstre	92,794	24.5	-4.1	5	-	Anders Fogh Rasmussen (K) Claus Hjort Frederiksen (K) Gitte Lillelund Bech (K) Pia Larsen Marion Pedersen (T)
Danish People's Party	56,507	14.9	+1.3	3	-	Pia Kjærsgaard (K) Søren Espersen (K) Mikkel Dencker (T)
Conservative People's Party	50,243	13.3	+3.8	3	+	Connie Hedegaard (K) Pia Christmas-Møller (K) Charlotte Dyremose (T)
Danish Social Liberal Party	36,093	9.5	+4.0	2	+	Moten Helveg Petersen (K) Elisabeth Geday (T)
Socialist People's Party	23,530	6.2	-0.7	1	-	Holger K. Nielsen (K)
Red-Green Alliance	14,055	3.7	+1.0	1	-	Line Barfod (T)
Centre Democrats	4,595	1.2	-1.2	0	-	
Christian Democrats*	3,741	1.0	-0.5	0	-	
The minority party	953	0.3	new	0	new	
Outside the parties	111	0.0	new	0	new	
In total	378,888			20	+1	

* The Christian Democrats ran in 2001 under the name Kristeligt Folkeparti.

=== 2001 election ===
At the 2001 Danish general election, there were 449,464 eligible voters in the Copenhagen County constituency. The district was awarded 19 mandates, including 5 additional mandates. The turnout was 87.97%.

Party	Votes	Percentage	+/-	Mandates	+/-	Elected MPs
Social Democrats	114,355	29.0	-5.9	5	-2	Mogens Lykketoft (K) Karen Jespersen (K) Mette Frederiksen (K) Per Kaalund (K) Morten Bødskov (K)
Venstre	112,790	28.6	+9.1	5	+2	Anders Fogh Rasmussen (K) Tove Fergo (K) Gitte Lillelund Bech (K) Pia Larsen (K) Flemming Oppfeldt (T)
Danish People's Party	53,557	13.6	+3.9	3	+1	Pia Kjærsgaard (K) Mikkel Dencker (K) Aase D. Madsen (T)
Conservative People's Party	37,630	9.5	-1.9	2	-	Pia Christmas-Møller (K) Charlotte Dyremose (T)
Socialist People's Party	27,327	6.9	-1.6	1	-	Holger K. Nielsen (K)
Danish Social Liberal Party	21,720	5.5	+1.6	1	-	Morten Helveg Petersen (K)
Red-Green Alliance	10,586	2.7	-0.4	1	-	Søren Søndergaard (T)
Centre Democrats	9,520	2.4	-3.5	0	-1	
Christian Democrats	5,975	1.5	+0.1	1	-	Bodil Kornbek (T)
Fremskridtspartiet	1,143	0.3	-0.9	0	-1	
In total	394,603			19	-1	

=== 1998 election ===
At the 1998 Danish general election, there were 449,823 eligible voters in Copenhagen County constituency. The district was awarded 20 mandates, including 6 additional mandates. The turnout was 87.40%.

Party	Votes	Percentage	+/-	Mandates	+/-	Elected MPs
Social Democrats	136,359	34.9	+2.4	7	+	Karen Jespersen (K) Mogens Lykketoft (K) Helle Degn (K) Lise Hækkerup (K) Per Kaalund (K) Hanne Andersen (T) Dorte Bennedsen (T)
Venstre	76,074	19.5	+2.4	3	-	Bertel Haarder (K) Pia Larsen (K) Tove Fergo (K)
Conservative People's Party	44,653	11.4	-9.5	2	-	Pia Christmas-Møller (K) Jens Heimburger (K)
Danish People's Party	37,963	9.7	new	2	new	Pia Kjærsgaard (K) Aase D. Madsen (K)
Socialistisk Folkeparti	33,027	8.5	-0.1	1	-	Holger K. Nielsen (K)
Centre Democrats	22,851	5.9	+1.6	1	-	Mimi Jakobsen (K)
Radikale Venstre	15,088	3.9	-1.1	1	-	Morten Helveg Petersen (T)
Enhedslisten	11,915	3.1	-0.5	1	-	Søren Søndergaard (T)
Kristeligt Folkeparti	5,654	1.4	+0.4	1	+	Flemming Kofod-Svendsen (T)
Progress Party	4,800	1.2	-4.4	1	-	Tom Behnke (T)
Outside the parties	1,091	0.3	-1.2	0	-	
Democratic Renewal	1,019	0.3	new	0	new	
In total	390,494			20	+2	

=== 1994 election ===
At the 1994 Danish general election, there were 457,119 eligible voters in Copenhagen County constituency. The district was awarded 18 mandates, including 3 additional mandates. The turnout was 85.95%.

Party	Votes	Percentage	+/-	Mandates	+/-	Elected MPs
Social Democrats	126,395	32.5	-3.9	6	-	Karen Jespersen (K) Mogens Lykketoft (K) Dorte Bennedsen (K) Helle Degn (K) Per Kaalund (K) Hanne Andersen (T)
Conservative People's Party	81,170	20.9	-0.4	4	-	Torben Rechendorff (K) Kai Dige Bach (K) Stefan G. Rasmussen (K) John Vinther (T)
Venestre	66,374	17.1	+7.1	3	+	Bertel Haarder (K) Pia Larsen (K) Tove Fergo (K)
Socialist People's Party	33,338	8.6	-0.8	1	-	Holger K. Nielsen (K)
The Progress Party	21,774	5.6	+1.7	1	-	Tom Behnke (K)
Radical Left	19,357	5.0	+0.7	1	-	Bjørn Elmquist (K)
The Center Democrats	16,718	4.3	-3.4	1	-	Mimi Jakobsen (K)
The unit list	14,157	3.6	+1.6	1	+	Søren Søndergaard (T)
Outside the parties	5,786	1.5	new	0	new	
Christian People's Party	4,041	1.0	-0.1	0	-	
In total	389,110			18	-1	

=== 1990 election ===
At the 1990 Danish general election, there were 458,585 eligible voters in Copenhagen County. The district was awarded 19 mandates, including 4 additional mandates. The turnout was 83.87%.

Party	Votes	Percentage	+/-	Mandates	+/-	Elected MPs
The Social Democracy	139,085	36.4	+8.6	7	+1	Mogens Lykketoft (K) Karen Jespersen (K) Ivar Nørgaard (K) Helle Degn (K) Dorte Bennedsen (K) Hanne Andersen (K) Hans Jørgen Jensen (T)
Conservative People's Party	81,304	21.3	-2.6	4	-	Poul Schlüter (K) Henning Dyremose (K) Kai Dige Bach (K) John Vinther (T)
Left	38,031	10.0	+4.5	2	+1	Bertel Haarder (K) Pia Larsen (K)
Socialist People's Party	35,885	9.4	-6.4	2	-1	Holger K. Nielsen (K) Pernille Frahm (K)
The Center Democrats	29,490	7.7	+1.0	1	-	Mimi Jakobsen (K)
Radical Left	16,262	4.3	-2.5	1	-	Lone Dybkjær (K)
The Progress Party	14,754	3.9	-3.1	1	-	Tom Behnke (T)
Common Course	9,579	2.5	+0.4	0	-	
The unit list	7,518	2.0	new	0	new	
Christian People's Party	4,329	1.1	+0.1	1	-	Flemming Kofod-Svendsen (T)
The Greens	3,196	0.8	-0.9	0	-	
Legal association	2,218	0.6	new	0	new	
Humanist Party	119	0.0	new	0	new	
In total	381,770			19	+1	

=== 1988 election ===
At the 1988 Danish general election, there were 459,941 eligible voters in the Copenhagen County constituency. The district was awarded 18 mandates, including 3 additional mandates. The turnout was 86.63%.

Party	Votes	Percentage	+/-	Mandates	+/-	Elected MPs
Social Democrats	110,076	27.8	+1.4	6	+1	Svend Jakobsen (K) Helle Degn (K) Ivar Nørgaard (K) Dorte Bennedsen (K) Mogens Lykketoft (T) Hanne Andersen (T)
Conservative People's Party	94,595	23.9	-0.9	4	-2	Poul Schlüter (K) Connie Hedegaard Koksbang (K) Kai Dige Bach (K) Flemming Jensen (K)
Socialist People's Party	62,493	15.8	-2.2	3	-1	Ingerlise Koefoed (K) Holger K. Nielsen (K) Ole Henriksen (K)
The Progress Party	27,780	7.0	+3.2	1	-	Mogens Glistrup (K)
Radical Left	27,035	6.8	-0.9	1	-	Lone Dybkjær (K)
The Center Democrats	26,552	6.7	-0.3	1	-	Mimi Jakobsen (K)
Left	21,879	5.5	+2.0	1	-	Bertel Haarder (K)
Common Course	8,360	2.1	-0.4	0	-1	
The Greens	6,655	1.7	+0.1	0	-	
The Communist Party of Denmark	4,067	1.0	-0.1	0	-	
Christian People's Party	3,930	1.0	-0.2	1	-	Flemming Kofod-Svendsen (T)
The Left Socialists	2,503	0.6	-0.9	0	-	
Outside the parties	46	0.0	+0.0	0	-	
In total	395,971			18	-3	

=== 1987 election ===
At the 1987 Danish general election, there were 461,471 eligible voters in the Copenhagen County constituency. The district was awarded 21 mandates, including 6 additional mandates. The turnout was 87.93%.

Party	Votes	Percentage	+/-	Mandates	+/-	Elected MPs
The Social Democracy	106,505	26.4	-4.1	5	-1	Svend Jakobsen (K) Helle Degn (K) Ivar Nørgaard (K) Dorte Bennedsen (K) Mogens Lykketoft (K)
Conservative People's Party	99,841	24.8	-2.3	6	-	Poul Schlüter (K) Flemming Jensen (K) Connie Hedegaard Koksbang (K) Kai Dige Bach (K) Annelise Gotfredsen (K) Per Stig Møller (T)
Socialist People's Party	72,583	18.0	+3.3	4	+1	Ingerlise Koefoed (K) Holger K. Nielsen (K) Ole Henriksen (K) Jørn Jespersen (T)
Radical Left	31,077	7.7	+1.0	1	-	Lone Dybkjær (K)
The Center Democrats	28,339	7.0	+1.7	1	-	Mimi (Stilling) Jakobsen (K)
The Progress Party	15,271	3.8	+0.7	1	-	Mogens Glistrup (T)
Left	14,119	3.5	-1.7	1	-	Bertel Haarder (T)
Common Course	10,232	2.5	new	1	new	Preben Møller Hansen (T)
The Greens	6,489	1.6	new	0	new	
The Left Socialists	6.137	1.5	-1.9	0	-1	
Christian People's Party	4,914	1.2	-0.1	1	-	Flemming Kofod-Svendsen (T)
Communist Party of Denmark	4,315	1.1	+0.2	0	-	
Legal association	2,031	0.5	-1.3	0	-	
Humanist Party	806	0.2	new	0	new	
The International-Socialist Workers' Party	203	0.1	-0.0	0	-	
Marxist-Leninist Party	96	0.0	+0.0	0	-	
Outside the parties	31	0.0	-0.0	0	-	
In total	402,989			21	-	

=== 1984 election ===
At the 1984 Danish general election, there were 459,635 eligible voters in the Copenhagen County constituency. The district was awarded 21 mandates, including 6 additional mandates. The turnout was 89.82%.

Party	Votes	Percentage	+/-	Mandates	+/-	Elected MPs
The Social Democracy	125.106	30.5	-0.6	6	-1	Svend Jakobsen (K) Ivar Nørgaard (K) Helle Degn (K) Mogens Lykketoft (K) Dorte Bennedsen (K) Hanne Andersen (T)
Conservative People's Party	110,977	27.1	+7.3	6	+1	Poul Schlüter (K) Flemming Jensen (K) Annelise Gotfredsen (K) Isi Foighel (K) Per Stig Møller (K) Connie Hedegaard Koksbang (T)
Socialist People's Party	60,286	14.7	+0.3	3	-	Ingerlise Koefoed (K) Ole Henriksen (K) Ruth Olsen (T)
Radical Left	27,276	6.7	+0.7	1	-	Lone Dybkjær (K)
The Center Democrats	21,664	5.3	-3.6	1	-1	Mimi (Stilling) Jakobsen (K)
Left	21,245	5.2	+1.5	1	-	Bertel Haarder (K)
The Left Socialists	13,884	3.4	-0.4	1	-	Anne Grete Holmsgård (T)
Progress Party	12,519	3.1	-4.8	1	-	Mogens Glistrup* (T)
Legal association	7,453	1.8	+0.0	0	-	
Christian People's Party	5,480	1.3	+0.4	1	+1	Flemming Kofod-Svendsen (T)
Communist Party of Denmark	3,788	0.9	-0.6	0	-	
The International-Socialist Workers' Party	311	0.1	+0.0	0	-	
Marxist-Leninist Party	93	0.0	new	0	-	
Outside the parties	38	0.0	-0.0	0	-	
In total	410,120			21	-	

* Mogens Glistrup was subsequently declared ineligible, and his mandate went to Pia Kjærsgaard instead.

=== 1981 election ===
At the 1981 Danish general election, there were 455,064 eligible voters in the Copenhagen County constituency. The district was awarded 21 mandates, including 6 additional mandates. The turnout was 85.17%.

Party	Votes	Percentage	+/-	Mandates	+/-	Elected MPs
The Social Democracy	119,887	31.1	-6.2	7	-1	Ivar Nørgaard (K) Svend Jakobsen (K) Mogens Lykketoft (K) Helle Degn (K) Dorte Bennedsen (K) Lise Østergaard (T) Hans Jørgen Jensen (T)
Conservative People's Party	76,197	19.8	+2.8	5	+2	Poul Schlüter (K) Lis Møller (K) Annelise Gotfredsen (K) Flemming Jensen (T) Finn Jørgensen (T)
Socialist People's Party	55,496	14.4	+7.0	3	+2	Ingerlise Koefoed (K) Ole Henriksen (K) Holger K. Nielsen (K)
The Center Democrats	34,441	8.9	+5.2	2	+1	Mimi (Stilling) Jakobsen (K) Jørgen Bruun (K)
The Progress Party	30,379	7.9	-1.2	1	-1	Mogens Glistrup (K)
Radical Left	23,191	6.0	-0.9	1	-	Lone Dybkjær (K)
The Left Socialists	14,831	3.8	-1.7	1	-	Preben Wilhjelm (T)
Left	14,160	3.7	-2.1	1	-	Bertel Haarder (T)
Legal association	6,758	1.8	-1.6	0	-1	
The Communist Party of Denmark	5,845	1.5	-0.9	0	-	
Christian People's Party	3,531	0.9	-0.2	0	-	
Communist Workers Party	572	0.1	-0.4	0	-	
The International-Socialist Workers' Party	236	0.1	new	0	new	
Outside the parties	43	0.0	new	0	new	
In total	385,567			21	+2	

=== 1979 election ===
At the 1979 Danish general election, there were 451,188 eligible voters in the Copenhagen County constituency. The district was awarded 19 mandates, including 4 additional mandates. The turnout was 87.45%.

Party	Votes	Percentage	+/-	Mandates	+/-	Elected MPs
Social Democrats	146,165	37.3	-0.0	8	+2	Dorte Bennedsen (K) Ivar Nørgaard (K) Helle Degn (K) Svend Jakobsen (K) Lise Østergaard (K) Niels Matthiasen (K) Hans Jørgen Jensen (T) Winnie Møller (T)
Conservative People's Party	66,528	17.0	+5.3	3	+1	Poul Schlüter (K) Annelise Gotfredsen (K) Flemming Jensen (K)
The Progress Party	35,511	9.1	-4.1	2	-	Mogens Glistrup (K) Steffen Kjærulff-Schmidt (K)
Socialist People's Party	29,082	7.4	+2.0	1	-	Ingerlise Koefoed (K)
Radical Left	27,095	6.9	+3.5	1	-	Lone Dybkjær (K)
Left	22,566	5.8	+1.0	1	-	Bertel Haarder (K)
The Left Socialists	21,505	5.5	+1.4	1	-	Preben Wilhjelm (K)
The Center Democrats	14,437	3.7	-5.2	1	-	Mimi Jakobsen (T)
Legal association	13,163	3.4	-0.8	1	-	Lis Starcke (T)
The Communist Party of Denmark	9,577	2.4	-2.2	0	-1	
Christian People's Party	4,253	1.1	-0.5	0	-1	
Communist Workers Party	2,035	0.5	new	0	new	
In total	391,917			19	+1	

=== 1977 election ===
At the 1977 Danish general election, there were 427,550 eligible voters in the Copenhagen County constituency. The district was awarded 18 mandates, including 3 additional mandates. The turnout was 90.72%.

Party	Votes	Percentage	+/-	Mandates	+/-	Elected MPs
The Social Democracy	143,964	37.3	+9.6	6	-	Kjeld Olesen (K) Ivar Nørgaard (K) Dorte Bennedsen (K) Svend Jakobsen (K) Helle Degn (K) Ejler Koch (K)
The Progress Party	50,901	13.2	-1.2	2	-1	Mogens Glistrup (K) Steffen Kjærulff-Schmidt (K)
Conservative People's Party	45,303	11.7	+3.7	2	+1	Poul Schlüter (K) Annelise Gotfredsen (K)
The Center Democrats	34,309	8.9	+5.6	1	-	Erhard Jakobsen (K)
Socialist People's Party	20,895	5.4	-2.3	1	-1	Ole Olsen (K)
Left	18,392	4.8	-13.0	1	-2	Bertel Haarder (K)
The Communist Party of Denmark	17,900	4.6	-0.8	1	-	Tove Jørgensen (K)
Legal association	16,345	4.2	+2.1	1	+1	Lis Starcke (K)
The Left Socialists	15,661	4.1	+1.0	1	-	Preben Wilhjelm (T)
Radical Left	13,264	3.4	-3.9	1	-	Grethe Philip (T)
Christian People's Party	6,043	1.6	-1.6	1	-	Bent Honoré (T)
The Pensioners' Party	2,566	0.7	new	0	new	
Outside the parties	24	0.0	-0.0	0	-	
In total	385,567			18	-2	

=== 1975 election ===
At the 1975 Danish general election, there were 421,074 eligible voters in Copenhagen County. The district was awarded 20 mandates, including 5 additional mandates. The turnout was 89.62%

Party	Votes	Percentage	+/-	Mandates	+/-	Elected MPs
Social Democrats	103,945	27.7	+6.0	6	+1	Kjeld Olesen (K) Ivar Nørgaard (K) Svend Jakobsen (K) Dorte Bennedsen (K) Niels Matthiasen (K) Ejler Koch (T)
Venstre	66,663	17.8	+10.7	3	+1	Poul Nyboe Andersen (K) Kirsten Sparre Andersen (K) Jens Jacobsen (K)
Progress Party	53,913	14.4	-1.6	3	-	Mogens Glistrup (K) Steffen Kjærulff-Schmidt (K) Kjeld Wamberg (K)
Conservative People's Party	29,851	8.0	-4.0	1	-1	Poul Schlüter (K)
Socialist People's Party	29,038	7.7	-1.3	2	-	Morten Lange (K) Poul Dam (T)
Danish Social Liberal Party	27,283	7.3	-2.3	1	-1	Grethe Philip (K)
Communist Party of Denmark	20,087	5.4	+0.6	1	-	Hanne Reintoft (K)
Centre Democrats	12,521	3.3	-8.8	1	-1	Erhard Jakobsen (T)
Christian People's Party	12,117	3.2	+1.1	1	-	Bent Honoré (T)
The Left Socialists	11,461	3.1	+0.8	1	+1	Preben Wilhjelm (T)
Legal association	7,945	2.1	-1.1	0	-1	
Outside the parties	61	0.0	-0.0	0	-	
In total	374,885			20	-1	

=== 1973 election ===
At the 1973 Danish general election, there were 417,851 eligible voters in the Copenhagen County constituency. The district was awarded 21 mandates, including 6 additional mandates. The turnout was 90.81%.

Party	Votes	Percentage	+/-	Mandates	+/-	Elected MPs
Social Democrats	81,876	21.7	-12.2	5	-2	Kjeld Olesen (K) Ivar Nørgaard (K) Svend Jakobsen (K) Ejler Koch (T) Helle Degn (T)
Progress Party	60,463	16.0	new	3	new	Mogens Glistrup (K) Palle Tillisch (K) Jens Peder Bodart (K)
Centre Democrats	45,667	12.1	new	2	new	Erhard Jakobsen (K) Egon Højland (K)
Conservative People's Party	45,194	12.0	-13.8	2	-4	Poul Schlüter (K) Knud Thomsen (K)
Danish Social Liberal Party	36,280	9.6	-4.1	2	-1	Grethe Philip (K) Lauge Dahlgaard (K)
Socialist People's Party	34,027	9.0	-3.8	2	-	Morten Lange (K) Poul Dam (T)
Venstre	26,888	7.1	+0.4	2	+1	Poul Nyboe Andersen (K) Kirsten Sparre Andersen (T)
Communist Party of Denmark	18,216	4.8	+3.1	1	+1	Hanne Reintoft (K)
Legal association	12,256	3.2	+1.5	1	+1	Poul Westergaard (T)
The Left Socialists	8,707	2.3	-0.2	0	-	
Christian People's Party	7,880	2.1	+1.3	1	+1	Bent Honoré (T)
Outside the parties	65	0.0	-0.2	0	-	
In total	377,519			21	+2	

=== 1971 election ===
At the 1971 Danish general election, there were 401,997 voters in Copenhagen County. The district was awarded 19 mandates, including 4 additional mandates. The turnout was 88.94%.

Party	Votes	Percentage	Mandates	Elected MPs
Social Democrats	120,403	33.9	7	Erhard Jakobsen (K) Ivar Nørgaard (K) Kjeld Olesen (K) Helle Degn (K) Svend Jakobsen (K) Niels Matthiasen (K) Poul Falk Hansen (T)
Conservative People's Party	91,578	25.8	6	Aage Hastrup (K) Knud Thomsen (K) Poul Schlüter (K) Ulla Worm (K) Flemming Jensen (T) Bo Kristensen (T)
Danish Social Liberal Party	48,785	13.7	3	Grethe Philip (K) Sven Skovmand (K) Erik Nordqvist (T)
Socialist People's Party	45,374	12.8	2	Morten Lange (K) Poul Dam (K)
Venstre	23,902	6.7	1	Poul Nyboe Andersen (K)
The Left Socialists	8,805	2.5	0	
Communist Party of Denmark	6.131	1.7	0	
Legal association	6,047	1.7	0	
Christian People's Party	2,992	0.8	0	
Outside the parties	842	0.2	0	
In total	354,859		19	
