= 2025 Sønderborg municipal election =

Municipal election in Denmark

← 2021	18 November 2025	2029 →

All 31 seats to the Sønderborg municipal council 16 seats needed for a majority
- Turnout: 41,239 (68.8%) ▼0.2%
	First party	Second party	Third party
	A	V	I
Party	Social Democrats	Venstre	Liberal Alliance
Last election	14 seats, 43.4%	11 seats, 30.2%	0 seats, 0.3%
Seats won	13	8	3
Seat change	▼1	▼3	▲3
Popular vote	15,682	9,830	3,590
Percentage	38.7%	24.3%	8.9%
Swing	▼4.7%	▼5.9%	▲8.5%
	Fourth party	Fifth party	Sixth party
	O	Æ	F
Party	Danish People's Party	Denmark Democrats	Green Left
Last election	1 seat, 4.1%	Did not stand	0 seats, 2.0%
Seats won	2	2	1
Seat change	▲1	▲2	▲1
Popular vote	2,758	2,077	1,875
Percentage	6.8%	5.1%	4.6%
Swing	▲2.7%	New	▲2.6%
	Seventh party	Eighth party
	S	Ø
Party	Schleswig Party	Red-Green Alliance
Last election	3 seats, 8.0%	1 seat, 2.1%
Seats won	1	1
Seat change	▼2	0
Popular vote	1,566	1,559
Percentage	3.9%	3.9%
Swing	▼4.2%	▲1.8%
Mayor before election
Erik Lauritzen
Social Democrats
Mayor after election
Erik Lauritzen
Social Democrats

The 2025 Sønderborg Municipal election was held on November 18, 2025, to elect the 31 members to sit in the regional council for the Sønderborg Municipal council, in the period of 2026 to 2029. Erik Lauritzen from the Social Democrats, would secure re-election.

== Background ==
Following the 2021 election, Erik Lauritsen from Social Democrats became mayor for his third term. He ran for the mayoral position for a fourth term.

== Electoral system ==
For elections to Danish municipalities, a number varying from 9 to 31 are chosen to be elected to the municipal council. The seats are then allocated using the D'Hondt method and a closed list proportional representation. Sønderborg Municipality had 31 seats in 2025.

== Electoral alliances ==
=== Electoral Alliance 1 ===
Party		Political alignment
C	Conservatives	Centre-right
I	Liberal Alliance	Centre-right to Right-wing
O	Danish People's Party	Right-wing to Far-right
Æ	Denmark Democrats	Right-wing to Far-right

=== Electoral Alliance 2 ===
Party		Political alignment
F	Green Left	Centre-left to Left-wing
Ø	Red-Green Alliance	Left-wing to Far-Left
Å	The Alternative	Centre-left to Left-wing

=== Electoral Alliance 3 ===
Party		Political alignment
K	Christian Democrats	Centre to Centre-right
M	Moderates	Centre to Centre-right
S	Schleswig Party	Centre (Regionalism)

== Results by polling station ==
Division	A	C	E	F	G	I	K	M	O	S	V	Æ	Ø	Å
Division	%	%	%	%	%	%	%	%	%	%	%	%	%	%
Nordborg	41.9	1.1	0.3	5.6	0.2	8.0	0.1	0.2	8.1	2.4	22.3	7.5	2.0	0.2
Havnbjerg	40.9	1.1	0.7	7.9	0.4	9.2	0.4	0.4	8.0	3.1	17.7	8.2	1.8	0.1
Egen	33.9	1.1	0.3	4.9	0.5	11.1	0.3	0.3	8.5	2.8	27.1	7.1	2.1	0.1
Fynshav	32.8	1.1	0.5	3.4	0.2	4.7	1.1	0.5	7.8	2.6	33.1	6.5	5.4	0.1
Augustenborg	37.4	1.2	0.3	3.6	0.3	11.1	0.4	0.3	7.5	1.6	27.9	5.2	3.0	0.0
Hørup	36.0	2.5	0.4	4.3	0.3	8.9	0.3	0.2	5.1	3.1	32.6	3.2	2.6	0.2
Sydals	25.3	1.0	1.3	5.8	0.6	4.9	0.4	0.3	7.9	2.7	39.9	7.0	2.6	0.1
Kegnæs	41.1	1.7	3.1	7.5	0.0	5.8	0.0	0.0	6.2	3.8	21.2	6.2	3.4	0.0
Humlehøj, Sønderborg	44.5	2.2	0.5	4.3	0.5	7.4	0.4	0.4	7.1	2.9	18.8	5.1	5.7	0.3
Sønderskov, Sønderborg	44.5	2.8	0.1	5.1	0.4	6.9	0.4	0.7	6.5	3.8	18.2	3.5	6.8	0.3
Kongevej, Sønderborg	40.1	3.4	0.2	5.7	0.3	8.2	0.2	0.7	4.9	4.3	23.2	2.9	5.5	0.4
Dybbøl	42.4	2.9	0.2	3.9	0.4	8.5	0.3	0.8	5.5	3.5	24.0	3.8	3.9	0.1
Vester Sottrup	36.5	2.2	0.3	3.3	0.3	9.1	0.4	0.6	7.3	3.8	27.1	6.3	2.6	0.1
Ullerup	33.8	1.8	0.2	3.4	0.2	8.6	0.6	0.1	9.0	3.3	27.1	9.2	2.0	0.5
Broager	32.0	1.8	0.5	5.1	0.0	14.3	0.1	0.8	6.2	5.9	25.4	5.3	2.7	0.1
Gråsten	37.5	1.8	0.3	3.6	0.1	10.8	0.2	0.6	6.7	7.4	24.1	4.0	2.7	0.2
Kværs	20.9	1.7	0.4	2.4	0.4	10.5	0.2	0.4	14.3	6.6	24.4	14.3	3.2	0.2

== Results ==
Party		Votes	%	+/-	Seats	+/-
Sønderborg Municipality
A	Social Democrats	15,682	38.74	-4.69	13	-1
V	Venstre	9,830	24.29	-5.90	8	-3
I	Liberal Alliance	3,590	8.87	+8.53	3	+3
O	Danish People's Party	2,758	6.81	+2.71	2	+1
Æ	Denmark Democrats	2,077	5.13	New	2	New
F	Green Left	1,875	4.63	+2.63	1	+1
S	Schleswig Party	1,566	3.87	-4.16	1	-2
Ø	Red-Green Alliance	1,559	3.85	+1.75	1	0
C	Conservatives	842	2.08	-0.53	0	0
M	Moderates	207	0.51	New	0	New
E	Vibeke Schou - Personlig Frihed	155	0.38	New	0	New
K	Christian Democrats	131	0.32	New	0	New
G	Alssundpartiet	125	0.31	New	0	New
Å	The Alternative	79	0.20	New	0	New
Total		40,476	100	N/A	31	N/A
Invalid votes		181	0.30	-0.07		
Blank votes		582	0.97	+0.19		
Turnout		41,239	68.84	-0.23		
Source: valg.dk

== Opinion polls ==
Polling firm	Fieldwork date	Sample size	A	V	S	O	C	Ø	F	I	E	G	K	M	Å	Æ	Others	Lead
Sønderborg Statsskole	31 Oct - 9 Nov 2025	654	28.0	15.0	7.2	6.3	2.0	9.0	9.2	14.7	0.8	0.5	0.0	1.1	0.5	6.0	–	13.0
Epinion	4 Sep - 13 Oct 2025	461	39.7	19.6	3.8	6.3	2.8	2.3	5.8	9.7	–	–	–	0.5	0.8	8.3	0.2	20.1
2024 european parliament election	9 Jun 2024		20.0	19.7	–	8.9	7.6	3.4	11.5	6.9	–	–	–	5.7	1.5	10.5	–	0.3
2022 general election	1 Nov 2022		33.5	15.2	–	2.9	3.8	2.2	4.7	6.5	–	–	0.5	8.4	1.2	11.3	–	18.3
2021 regional election	16 Nov 2021		33.3	42.7	–	3.9	3.5	2.8	3.3	0.7	–	–	0.5	–	0.3	–	–	9.4
2021 municipal election	16 Nov 2021		43.4 (14)	30.2 (11)	8.0 (3)	4.1 (1)	2.6 (0)	2.1 (1)	2.0 (0)	0.3 (0)	–	–	–	–	–	–	–	13.2
