= 2021 Sønderborg municipal election =

← 2017	16 November 2021	2025 →

All 31 seats to the Sønderborg Municipal Council 16 seats needed for a majority
- Turnout: 41,024 (69.1%) ▼5.4pp
	First party	Second party	Third party
	A	V	S
Party	Social Democrats	Venstre	Schleswig Party
Last election	15 seats, 41.5%	7 seats, 20.7%	5 seats, 13.3%
Seats won	14	11	3
Seat change	▼1	▲4	▼2
Popular vote	17,514	12,172	3,239
Percentage	43.4%	30.2%	8.0%
Swing	▲1.9%	▲9.5%	▼5.3%
	Fourth party	Fifth party	Sixth party
	D	O	Ø
Party	New Right	Danish People's Party	Red–Green Alliance
Last election	0 seats, 1.3%	3 seats, 10.2%	0 seats, 1.8%
Seats won	1	1	1
Seat change	▲1	▼2	▲1
Popular vote	2,007	1,655	847
Percentage	5.0%	4.1%	2.1%
Swing	▲3.7%	▼6.1%	▲0.3%
	Seventh party
	L
Party	Fælleslisten
Last election	1 seat, 3.3%
Seats won	0
Seat change	▼1
Popular vote	308
Percentage	0.8%
Swing	▼2.5%
Mayor before election
Erik Lauritsen
Social Democrats
Mayor after election
Erik Lauritsen
Social Democrats

Following the 2017 election, none of the two traditional blocs had a majority of seats. Local party Fælleslisten and regional Schleswig Party held 6 of the 31 seats, and both opted for supporting Erik Lauritsen from the Social Democrats to continue as mayor for his second term.

In this election, Fælleslisten lost representation, while the Schleswig Party lost 2 seats. However, once again, no bloc had a majority without the Schleswig Party. In the end, they stated that they would support the continuation of Erik Lauritsen as mayor.

Sønderborg Municipality was the only municipality in the 2021 Danish local elections where the Conservatives failed to win any seats.

== Electoral system ==
For elections to Danish municipalities, a number varying from 9 to 31 are chosen to be elected to the municipal council. The seats are then allocated using the D'Hondt method and a closed list proportional representation. Sønderborg Municipality had 31 seats in 2021

Unlike in Danish General Elections, in elections to municipal councils, electoral alliances are allowed.

== Electoral alliances ==
=== Electoral Alliance 1 ===
Party		Political alignment
A	Social Democrats	Centre-left
M	Alsisk Parti	Local politics

=== Electoral Alliance 2 ===
Party		Political alignment
B	Social Liberals	Centre to centre-left
S	Schleswig Party	Centre (regionalism)

=== Electoral Alliance 3 ===
Party		Political alignment
C	Conservatives	Centre-right
D	New Right	Right-wing to far-right
I	Liberal Alliance	Centre-right to right-wing
O	Danish People's Party	Right-wing to far-right
V	Venstre	Centre-right

=== Electoral Alliance 4 ===
Party		Political alignment
F	Green Left	Centre-left to left-wing
Ø	Red–Green Alliance	Left-wing to far-Left

== Results by polling station ==
H = Sønderborglisten
M = Alsisk Parti

Division	A	B	C	D	F	H	I	L	M	O	S	V	Æ	Ø
Division	%	%	%	%	%	%	%	%	%	%	%	%	%	%
Nordborg	52.0	0.3	1.4	5.0	2.0	0.0	0.4	0.2	0.1	5.9	3.4	27.4	0.4	1.4
Havnbjerg	51.7	0.4	1.5	4.9	2.8	0.0	0.4	1.0	0.3	6.3	3.0	26.0	0.1	1.5
Egen	48.3	0.5	1.2	6.5	1.7	0.0	0.3	0.6	0.2	4.7	3.7	31.4	0.1	0.8
Fynshav	41.3	1.0	1.5	6.8	2.3	0.0	0.0	1.0	0.4	3.8	6.3	32.9	0.1	2.4
Kegnæs	41.5	0.8	1.7	6.7	2.0	0.0	1.7	1.7	0.0	3.6	10.6	27.2	0.0	2.5
Sydals	34.2	0.6	2.3	6.9	2.1	0.0	0.4	1.9	0.4	4.2	6.1	39.1	0.2	1.5
Hørup	39.4	0.6	3.4	3.9	2.0	0.0	0.3	0.9	0.1	2.4	8.5	36.9	0.4	1.2
Augustenborg	39.5	1.1	3.5	5.4	2.2	0.1	0.4	1.3	0.2	3.5	8.1	33.5	0.1	1.1
Humlehøj, Sønderborg	48.5	2.1	2.7	4.1	2.1	0.0	0.4	1.2	0.1	4.1	6.8	25.0	0.3	2.4
Sønderskov, Sønderborg	48.5	1.7	2.8	4.6	2.5	0.1	0.3	0.6	0.1	3.6	8.5	22.5	0.4	3.9
Kongevej, Sønderborg	41.4	1.6	3.5	3.0	2.6	0.1	0.2	0.3	0.1	2.9	11.3	28.9	0.4	3.6
Dybbøl	41.0	1.0	3.8	3.7	1.9	0.0	0.3	0.7	0.1	2.9	9.0	33.1	0.2	2.3
Gråsten	39.1	0.8	2.7	4.1	1.6	0.1	0.3	0.5	0.1	4.5	11.7	32.5	0.2	1.8
Broager	39.7	0.5	2.2	4.5	1.3	0.0	0.3	0.6	0.1	4.5	10.3	34.3	0.3	1.4
Ullerup	42.0	0.5	2.0	8.1	1.4	0.1	0.7	0.8	0.2	3.8	5.1	33.7	0.5	1.2
Vester Sottrup	45.0	0.5	2.4	6.4	1.5	0.0	0.4	0.7	0.1	3.5	7.9	30.3	0.0	1.3
Kværs	16.9	0.4	1.6	23.0	0.8	0.0	1.0	0.4	0.0	14.2	8.5	31.5	0.0	1.8

== Results ==
Party		Votes	%	+/-	Seats	+/-
Sønderborg Municipality
A	Social Democrats	17,514	43.43	+1.89	14	-1
V	Venstre	12,172	30.18	+9.46	11	+4
S	Schleswig Party	3,239	8.03	-5.29	3	-2
D	New Right	2,007	4.98	+3.64	1	+1
O	Danish People's Party	1,655	4.10	-6.10	1	-2
C	Conservatives	1,051	2.61	+0.60	0	0
Ø	Red-Green Alliance	847	2.10	+0.29	1	+1
F	Green Left	809	2.01	-0.11	0	0
B	Social Liberals	417	1.03	+0.37	0	0
L	Fælleslisten	308	0.76	-2.51	0	-1
I	Liberal Alliance	135	0.33	-1.13	0	0
Æ	Freedom List	106	0.26	New	0	New
M	Alsisk Parti	53	0.13	-0.13	0	0
H	Sønderborglisten	14	0.03	New	0	New
Total		40,327	100	N/A	31	N/A
Invalid votes		224	0.38	+0.11		
Blank votes		473	0.80	-0.13		
Turnout		41,024	69.07	-5.48		
Source: valg.dk
