= KDU =

KDU may refer to

- Kristdemokratiska Ungdomsförbundet (Christian Democratic Youth), Sweden
- Kristendemokratisk Ungdom (Christian Democratic Youth), Denmark
- Christian and Democratic Union former electoral coalition, Czechoslovakia
- KDU College, Malaysia
- Skardu Airport IATA code
