= Battle of Als =

Battle of the Second Schleswig War

- Part of the Second Schleswig War
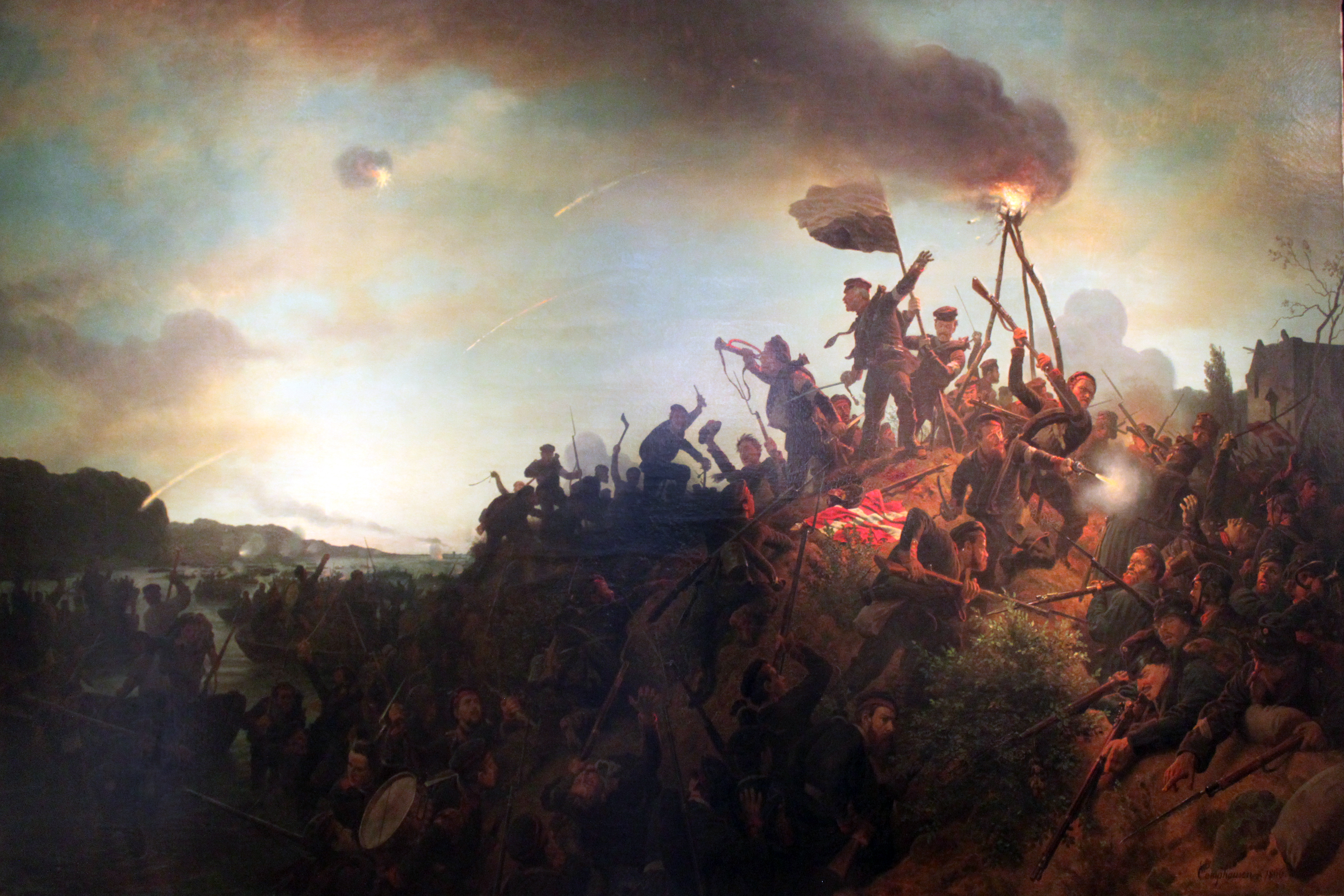
- The Storming of Als by the Prussians; Wilhelm Camphausen, 1866
Date	29 June – 1 July 1864
Location	On and near the island of Als 54.9833°N 9.9167°E
Result	Prussian victory

Belligerents
Denmark	(Kingdom of Prussia) Prussia

Commanders and leaders
(Denmark) Peter Frederik Steinmann	(Kingdom of Prussia) Herwarth von Bittenfeld

Strength
10,000; 1 monitor (Rolf Krake)	23,000

Casualties and losses
216 killed 462 wounded 1,878 captured 536 missing 30 guns captured 1 monitor damaged Total: 3,092	365 killed or wounded 7 missing
- Location within Denmark

The Battle of Als (Danish: Slaget om Als; German: Übergang nach Alsen) was fought on 29 June 1864 during the Second Schleswig War between Denmark and Prussia. It was the last major engagement of the war, as the Prussians under General Herwarth von Bittenfeld secured the island of Als – occupied by 9,000 Danish troops, including the garrison of Dybbøl which had retreated there – in a night attack masterminded by the Chief of Staff (later Field Marshal) Leonhard Graf von Blumenthal.

== Background ==
On May 12, peace talks began in London. The Danes were offered by the Prussians a border that was close to today's, but it was rejected by the government in Copenhagen. Prussia also proposed a referendum in Schleswig on where the border would go, but it was also rejected. Eventually, the inevitable collapse of the negotiations was due to the defeat at the Battle of Dybbøl on April 18. The Danish negotiators with Prime Minister D.G. Monrad spearheaded the demand for a demarcation at the Eider. On June 26, the ceasefire expired. The allied Prussians and Austrians could continue the war without any problems, so they had to transfer troops from the conquered Jutland to the Danish islands. The Prussian military leadership wanted to attack both Als and Funen at the same time. The Chancellor Otto von Bismarck decided that Als would be conquered first.

== Prelude ==
=== Danish plans ===
The Danes had built a network of trenches and artillery positions along the entire coast from Sønderborg in the south to the tip of the Kær Peninsula Arnkilsøre in the north. In the waters around Als, Danish warships and gunboats circled ready to intervene in the event of an attack on the island. While the battle was in progress, the Danish troops would transport the ships anchored up in the 9 km long bay Hørup Hav, east of Sønderborg, but then anchored off the south side of the peninsula Kegnæs, not to be cut off and enclosed by the north-advancing Prussians. The owner of Sandbjerggård, who owned the forest area along Alssund from Sandbjerg to Sottrupskov, had at one point offered the Danish Ministry of War to cut down the parts of the forest facing Alssund, but the Ministry of War did not think the Prussians would use the area. The defense of Als was organized in such a way that the 1st Division got the guarding of the coastline from south of Sønderborg to Amkilsøre, while the 7th Brigade and 1st Battery got the guarding of the coastline from Stolbro Næs to Hellesøgaard Ferry. 1st Division got headquarters in Ulkebøl, Headquarters was temporarily relocated to Hørup Nederby. 3rd Cavalry Brigade guarded the coast from Hellesøgaard Ferry over Tontoft Nakke, Fynshav, Mommark to the west coast of Kegenæs, 4th Dragon Regiment 2nd Half Regiment northernmost, Gardehusarregimentet southernmost. In case of alarm, 2 squadrons were to meet south of Ketting, 2nd Half Regiment west of Hørup Church.

=== Prussian plans ===
On June 28, General Eberhard Herwarth von Bittenfeld published the outline for the crossing. According to this, the Manstein Division was first to be put over and take possession of Arnkil, Rønhave, and the surrounding terrain; later it was to advance towards Ulkebøl and Hørup to prevent the Danish troops from embarking. The Wintzingerode Division was to follow immediately after and be directed against Ulkebøl, 25th Brigade in front, 49th Brigade in reserve. The reserve artillery was to occupy the above mentioned positions at 1 am, and the mounted artillery was to assemble at Ragebøl. 13th Division's artillery was to be lined up at the eastern exit of Blans, available to the division commander. The boarding of the boats was to take place from 1 to 2 o' clock in the morning, and the crossing was to be made without delay.

== Battle ==
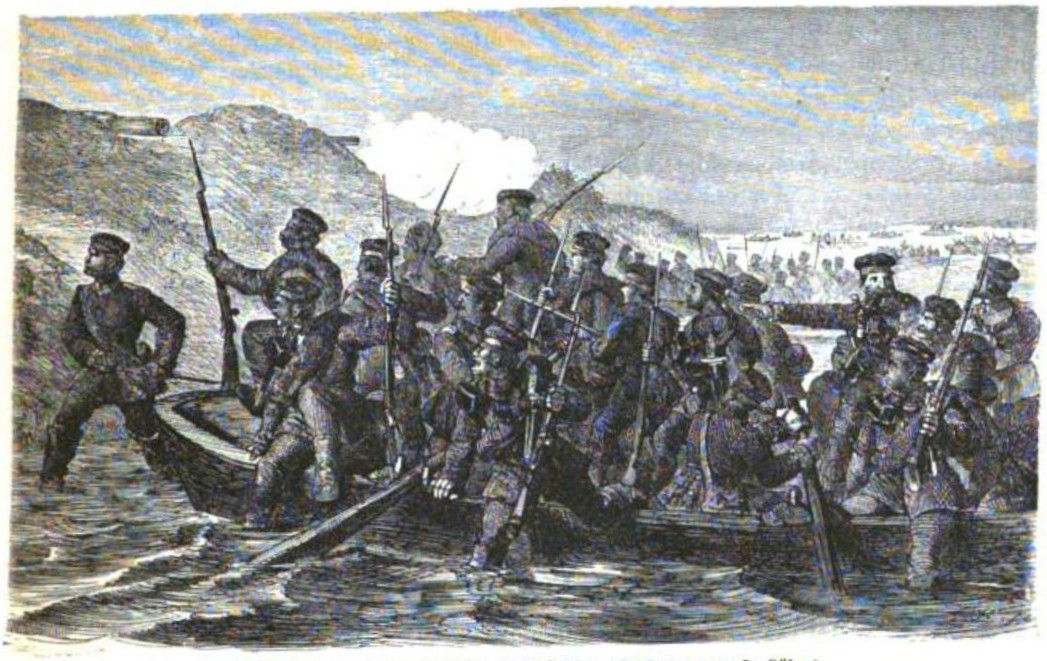
Prussian troops landing on Als

The Prussian command gave orders for the crossing of the Alssund – the narrow strait separating Als from the mainland of Jutland – to begin in the night of 28–29 June 1864. The Commander-in-Chief had selected Øster Snogbæk, at the northern end of the strait, as the crossing place, the nearby Sottrup Storskov woods providing cover which enabled the preparations to be hidden from the Danes. At midnight, the Prussian troops were gathered for the assault, without packs and wearing Feldmützen (forage caps) instead of helmets.

At 2:00 am 2,500 Prussian soldiers started crossing the Alssund, between the village of Sottrupskov and the Sandbjerg Estate, in small boats. The Danish modern armoured monitor Rolf Krake was in Augustenborg fjord, and sailed to the Alssund where it caused the Prussians severe difficulties and stopped the crossing. But after that the Rolf Krake, due to damage including to its bridge caused by heavy Prussian shelling and the mistaken belief that Prussians had already crossed the strait south of its position, suddenly turned around and sailed away; the Prussian troops continued the crossing.

At 2:15 am the Prussians landed in Arnkil (opposite Sottrupskov) and under heavy fire took the Danish entrenchments. This let them build a pontoon bridge of 32 segments over the Alssund. Of the Danish army, Regiment No. 5 went north to Sønderborg, and Regiment No. 18 fought the Prussians near the village of Kær. The Danes eventually retreated to Kegnæs, some surrendered, some were evacuated by ship.

The Danish army lost nearly 3,000 men (killed, wounded or captured) on Als.

== Legacy ==
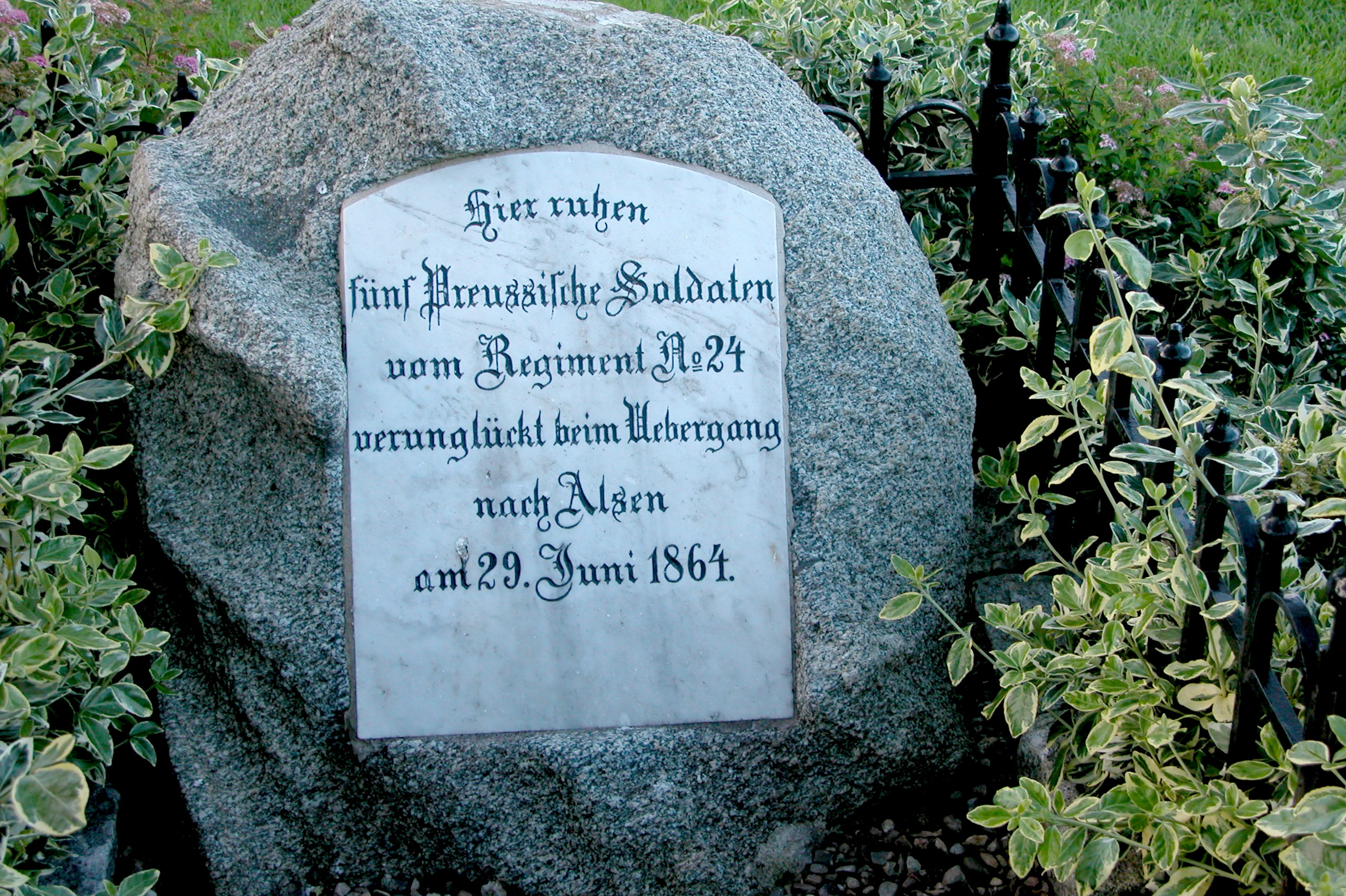
Memorial stone in Sottrupskov: "Here rest five Prussian soldiers of the 24th Regiment, drowned during the crossing to Als on 29 June 1864"

Following Denmark's defeat by the Austro-Prussian army, Als became part of Prussia and later Germany until the referendum of 1920.

Johann Gottfried Piefke, the famous German march composer, dedicated his "Der Alsenströmer" to the battle.
