= Hanne Reintoft =

Danish politician (1934–2025)

Member of the Folketing for Copenhagen County
- In office 4 December 1973 – 7 October 1976
- Succeeded by: Tove Jørgensen
- In office 22 November 1966 – 21 September 1971

Personal details
- Born: Hanne Beha Erichsen; 3 March 1934; Copenhagen, Denmark
- Died: 20 January 2025 (aged 90)
- Political party: SF (until 1967); VS (1967–1968); DKP (from 1970)
- Education: Sociale Højskole
- Occupation: Social worker

Hanne Reintoft (3 March 1934 – 20 January 2025) was a Danish politician. A member of the Green Left, the Left Socialists, and the Communist Party, she served in the Folketing from 1966 to 1971 and again from 1973 to 1976.

Reintoft died on 20 January 2025, at the age of 90.
