= Isabella Arendt =

Danish Conservative politician

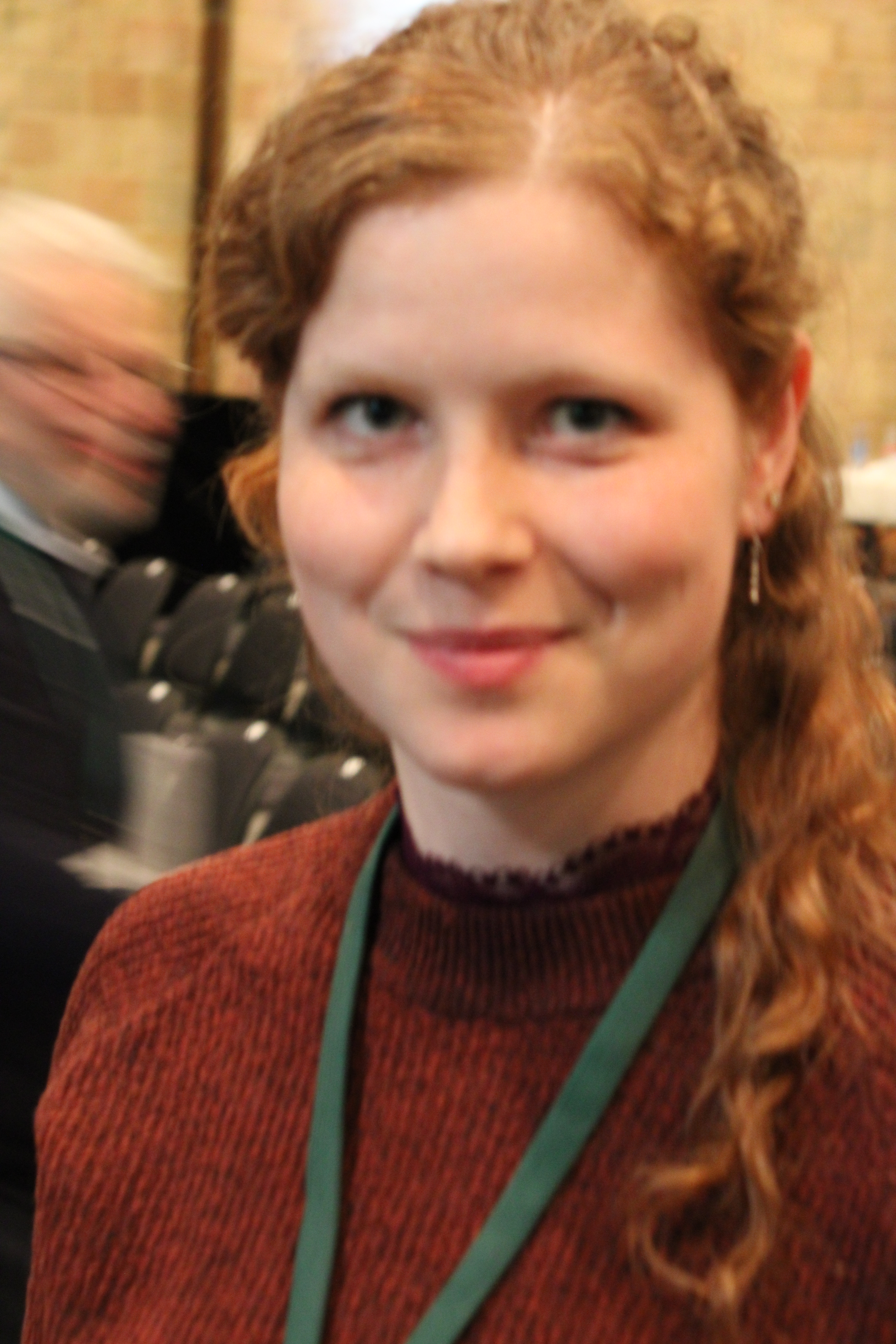
- Isabella Arendt in 2024

Leader of the Christian Democrats
- In office 13 October 2019 – 17 May 2022
- Preceded by: Stig Grenov
- Succeeded by: Marianne Karlsmose

Personal details
- Born: 7 May 1993 (age 32) Fredericia, Denmark

Isabella Arendt Laursen (born 7 May 1993 in Fredericia) is a Danish politician who was the leader of the Christian Democrats from 2019 to 2022. Arendt lives in Copenhagen and is currently studying political science at Copenhagen University.

== Political career ==
Arendt ran unsuccessfully for the Danish parliament, Folketinget, in the 2011 and 2015 elections. In both elections, the Christians won less than the 2% electoral threshold, and did not get any seats in the Folketing. After the 2011 election, she was briefly a member of the Danish Social Liberal Party.

On 7 May 2019, Prime Minister Lars Løkke Rasmussen announced that the 2019 election would be held on 5 June. A debate with all the party chairmen, including Stig Grenov of the Christian Democrats, was set to take place the following evening. However, Grenov became malaised shortly before the debate and Arendt, then deputy chairman, had to take his place. Arendt was hailed for her performance, and dubbed the "substitute from heaven". On May 13, one week into the election campaign, Grenov took a leave of absence due to stress, and Arendt was appointed acting chairman during the rest of the election campaign. Arendt was at the top of the party's list in the East Jutland constituency, but was not elected. Despite doubling its share of the vote compared to the previous election, the Christian Democrats still fell below the 2% threshold.

On 13 October 2019, she was elected chairman of the Christian Democrats. On 17 May 2022 she stepped down from the leadership and resigned from the party with immediate effect, stating that she no longer felt she had support within the party.

In June 2022, Arendt was selected by the Conservatives to stand as a candidate for the Folketing. She was not elected in the 2022 Danish general election.

Political offices
Preceded by Stig Grenov	Leader of the Danish Christian Democrats; 2019–2022	Succeeded by Marianne Karlsmose
