= Grethe Philip =

Danish politician (1916–2016)

Member of the Folketing for the Copenhagen County constituency
- In office 15 November 1960 – 23 October 1979

Personal details
- Born: Inger Magrethe Philip; 14 August 1916 Snekkersten, Denmark
- Died: 1 September 2016 (aged 100) Hellerup, Denmark
- Party: Danish Social Liberal Party
- Spouse: Kjeld Philip (m. 1938; died 1989)
- Children: 2
- Occupation: Politician

Inger Margrethe Philip (14 August 1916 – 1 September 2016) was a Danish politician for the Danish Social Liberal Party who was elected to serve as a member of parliament in the Copenhagen County district in the Folketing from 1960 to 1979. Before entering politics, she worked as a clerk in the secretariat of the Labor Market Commission and then in the Ministry of Labor. Philip got involved in the political affairs of the social scene and women. She was on various committees such as the Finance Committee and the National Pension Commission.

== Biography ==
On 14 August 1916, Philip was born Inger Margrethe Nygaard in Snekkersten, Tikøb, Egebæksvang. She was the daughter of the office manager, cand. jur. Einar Oluf Nygaard, and the clerk Elna Marie Henrikgine Dahlberg. Philip was raised in a household in which her parents were educated academically and social and political topics were talked about. In 1935, she enrolled at the Ingwersen and Ellbrechts School as a student, did the first part of her science examination at the University of Copenhagen, and graduated as the first woman from the economics program (cand.oecon.) of Aarhus University in 1941. Following a period as a secretary at the Aarhus Orthopedic Hospital between 1942 and 1945, Philip worked as a teacher of various advanced courses from 1945 to 1949. In 1951, she was employed to become a business supervisor at the Central Work Instructions in Copenhagen until 1954, where she became aware of economic and social impacts on young girls. From 1954 to 1958, Philip worked as a remunerated clerk in the secretariat of the Labor Market Commission, then again as a clerk in the Ministry of Labor between 1958 and 1960, where she edited De store årgange.

Philip was a member of the Danish Women's Society in Aarhus, serving as chair of its youth circle from 1944 to 1946. At the 1960 Danish general election, she was elected to serve the Copenhagen County district in the Hellerup constituency the constituency on behalf of the Danish Social Liberal Party in the Folketing due to a large personal vote. Philip became involved in the political affairs of the social scene and women, and represented the Lyngby constituency from 1968 to 1979. Between 1960 and 1965, she served as a member of the Wages Council, the supervisory board of the Stutgården treatment home from 1961 to 1970 and the National Pension Commission in 1961. Philip served on the supervisory board of the Royal Danish Theatre in 1962 before becoming its chair from 1971 to 1975. In 1962, she was the second woman to serve as a member of the Finance Committee. Between 1962 and 1974, Philip was a member of the Cultural Foundation's Board, and on the Social Reform Commission from 1964 to 1972, where she conducted a thorough social legislation study and worked to simplify the administration and structure and better social sector staff training.

From 1964 to 1968, she was a member of the Varna orphanage's supervisory board, as well as The Women's Commission between 1965 and 1974. Philip was a member of the Statens Åndssvageforsorg from 1968 to 1970, the Board of Representatives for Danmarks Nationalbank between 1968 and 1971, was a member of Sparekassen København-Sjælland's supervisory board from 1969 on, served on the business guidance council from 1970, was on Dansk Sparinvest's board starting in 1971 and on KAB's board from 1976. She was offered the cabinet position of Minister for Social Affairs by Hilmar Baunsgaard, the Prime Minister of Denmark, but she rejected the offer. Philip was voted the recipient of the first Mathilde Prize in 1970. She lost her seat in the Folketing in the 1979 Danish general election on 23 October that year, but continued to be a financial board member, becoming chair of Sparekassen SDS and SDS in 1981 and 1984, respectively.

== Personal life ==
Philip was married to the government minister and her economics professor Kjeld Philip from 19 February 1938 until his death on 27 October 1989. They had two children. She died on 1 September 2016.
