= Egon Jakobsen =

Danish politician

Egon Jakobsen (born 1948 in Bjergsted) is a Danish politician. He has been a part of Christian Democrats since 1973. After Per Ørum Jørgensen was fired as chairman by the members of the party in September 2012, Egon Jakobsen stepped up as ad interim chairman, being the deputy chairman at the time. In October 2012, Stig Grenov was elected as chairman for the party, and Jakobsen continued as deputy chairman.

Egon got married in 1972, and has two children.

Political offices
Preceded by Per Ørum Jørgensen	Leader of the Danish Christian Democrats; 2012 (a.i)	Succeeded by Stig Grenov
