= Jann Sjursen =

Danish politician and teacher

Jann Sjursen (born 23 October 1963, in Næstved) is a teacher and a Danish politician representing the Christian People's Party. In 1986 he was elected secretary general of the Nordic Christian Democratic Youth and from 1987 till 1989 he was chairman of the Christian People's Party's Youth. In 1990 he was elected party leader at only 26 years of age. This signified a change of the parties profile and themes such as the environment were emphasized more. He stayed party leader till 2002. Together with Flemming Kofod-Svendsen, his predecessor as party leader, he entered the first government of Poul Nyrup Rasmussen in 1993 as Minister of Energy.

After his political career he was secretary general of the humanitarian and development agency Caritas Denmark.

He left the party in 2007 because of his disagreement with the party's approach to abortion.

Political offices
| Preceded by Flemming Kofod-Svendsen | Leader of the Danish Christian Democrats; 1990–2003 | Succeeded by Marianne Karlsmose |
