= Kai Dige Bach =

Danish politician (1936–2026)

Member of the Folketing for Copenhagen County
- In office 8 September 1987 – 10 March 1998

Personal details
- Born: Kai Meinert Dige Bach; 1 January 1936 Copenhagen, Denmark
- Died: 19 September 2026 (aged 90)
- Party: DKF
- Education: Niels Brock Copenhagen Business College
- Occupation: Businessman

Kai Meinert Dige Bach (1 January 1936 – 19 September 2026) was a Danish politician of the Conservative People's Party (DKF).

A graduate of the Niels Brock Copenhagen Business College, he took an interest in politics in his youth, joining the Communist Party of Denmark. However, he later joined the DKF and became a member of the municipal council of Herlev Municipality. He was then elected to the Folketing in 1987, representing Copenhagen County and serving until he opted not to run again in 1998.

Bach died on 19 September 2026, at the age of 90.
