= Marianne Karlsmose =

Danish politician, leader of the Christian Democrats

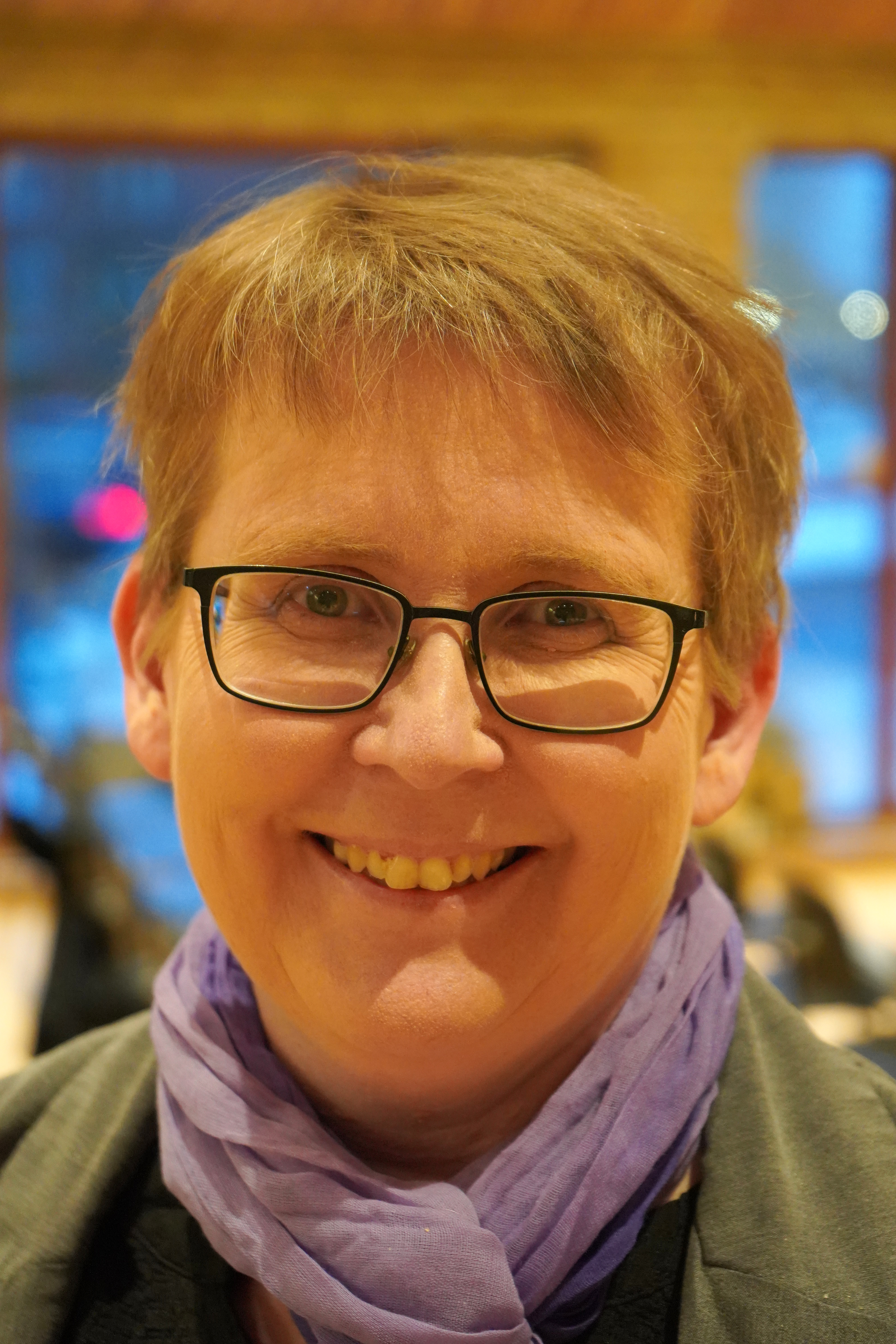
- Marianne in 2026

Leader of Kristendemokraterne
- In office 10 October 2022 – 7 November 2022
- Preceded by: Isabella Arendt
- Succeeded by: Jeppe Hedaa
- In office 2002–2005
- Preceded by: Jann Sjursen
- Succeeded by: Bodil Kornbek

Personal details
- Born: 6 June 1973 (age 53)
- Party: Kristendemokraterne
- Spouse: Birger Nielsen
- Children: 2
- Education: University of Aarhus

Marianne Karlsmose (born 6 June 1973) is a Danish politician who was leader of the party the Christian Democrats from 2002 to 2005 and again in 2022.

== Education and career ==
Karlsmose graduated from the (Fredericia Amtsgymnasium) high school in 1992. She received a master's degree in history and politics from the University of Aarhus in 2001.

She was formerly the party leader from 2002 to 2005. When she succeeded Jann Sjursen in 2002 she led an invigoration process of the party was one of the drivers for a name change of the party from the somewhat archaic name "Kristeligt Folkeparti" to the more modern "Kristendemokraterne". At the general election in 2005, the party did not pass the general threshold of two percent of the votes and it lost its seats in the Danish parliament Folketinget. As a consequence, Marianne Karlsmose stepped down and was succeeded by Bodil Kornbek.

After former leader of the Christian Democrats Isabella Arendt stepped down in May 2022, Karlsmose functioned as temporary leader of the party. She was officially elected in October 2022, in the midst of the 2022 general election. Karlsmose has led a campaign against former Prime Minister Lars Løkke Rasmussen of the Moderates to position herself as the center-right of Danish politics. Karlsmose supports a government over the center and wants to avoid a government with the Denmark Democrats, the New Right and the Danish People's Party.

Karlsmose stepped down from the position of leader on 7 November 2022 after a disappointing result of 0.5% of the vote in the 2022 Danish general election.

In September 2025, Marianne Karlsmose switched parties to the Conservative People's Party and became a parliamentary candidate for the Conservatives in the West Jutland Greater Constituency. She also resigned from the regional council in the Central Jutland Region, so that the Christian Democrats could retain the mandate.

== Personal life ==
She is married to Birger Nielsen. They have two children. Karlsmose is also a high school teacher at the Christian High School in Ringkøbing.

Political offices
Preceded by Jann Sjursen	Leader of the Danish Christian Democrats; 2002–2005	Succeeded by Bodil Kornbek
