= HDMS Rolf Krake (1863) =

Danish ironclad

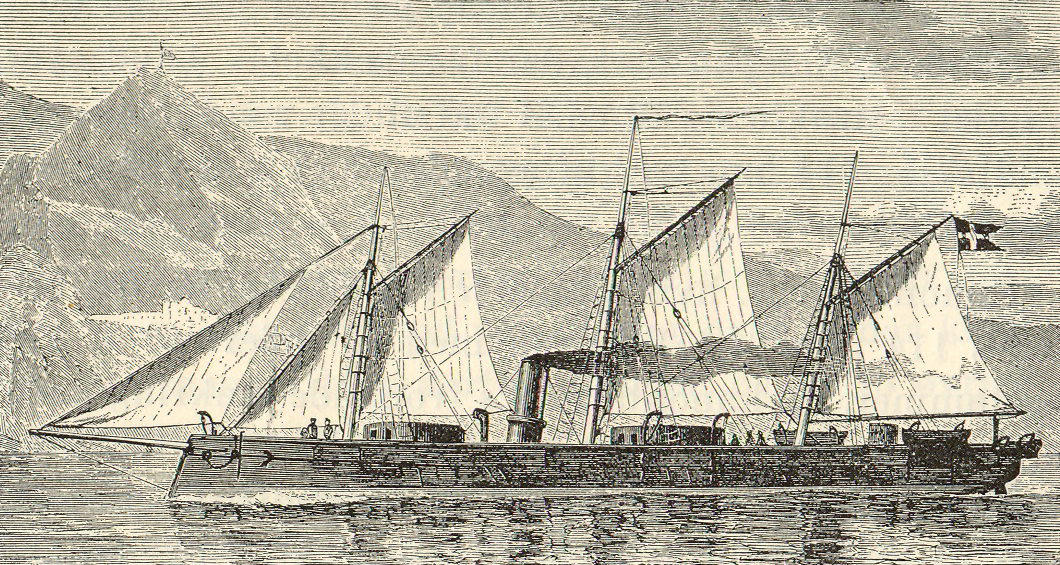
- Rolf Krake

History

Kingdom of Denmark
- Name: Rolf Krake
- Namesake: Rolf Krake
- Ordered: 28 August 1862
- Builder: Robert Napier and Sons, Govan
- Laid down: 1862
- Launched: 6 May 1863
- Commissioned: 1 July 1863
- Decommissioned: 29 June 1907
- Fate: Scrapped, 1907

General characteristics
- Type: Turret ironclad
- Displacement: 1,360 long tons (1,380 t)
- Length: 191 ft 3 in (58.3 m) (o/a)
- Beam: 38 ft 1 in (11.6 m)
- Draft: 11 ft 6 in (3.5 m)
- Installed power: 700 ihp (520 kW)
- Propulsion: 1 shaft, 1 steam engine
- Sail plan: Schooner-rigged
- Speed: 10.5 knots (19.4 km/h; 12.1 mph)
- Range: 1,150 nmi (2,130 km; 1,320 mi) at 8 knots (15 km/h; 9.2 mph)
- Complement: 140
- Armament: 2 × twin 68-pounder smoothbore guns
- Armour: Belt: 4.5 in (110 mm); Gun turret: 4.5 in (110 mm)

Rolf Krake was a Danish turret ironclad built in Scotland during the 1860s. The vessel was designed by Cowper Phipps Coles, a pioneering naval architect, and was the first warship of any navy to carry a turret of the type designed by Coles. She was the first all-iron, steam-powered vessel acquired by Denmark.

== Design and description ==
Rolf Krake was ordered in 1862 as tensions rose between Prussia and Denmark over the Duchy of Schleswig-Holstein in the early 1860s. The ship had an overall length of 191 feet 3 inches (58.3 m), a beam of 38 feet 1 inch (11.6 m), and a draft of 11 feet 6 inches (3.5 m). She displaced 1,360 long tons (1,382 t) and her crew consisted of 140 officers and ratings. Hinged bulwarks were fitted to improve Rolf Krake's seakeeping abilities. She was equipped with a beak-shaped ram at the bow.

The ship had one direct-acting steam engine that drove a single 9-foot (110 in) propeller, using steam provided by two boilers. The engine produced a total of 700 indicated horsepower (520 kW) which gave her a maximum speed of 10.5 knots (19.4 km/h; 12.1 mph) during her sea trials in mid-1863. Rolf Krake carried 135 long tons (137 t) of coal, enough to steam 1,150 nautical miles (2,130 km; 1,320 mi) at 8 knots (15 km/h; 9.2 mph). She was schooner-rigged with three masts.

Rolf Krake was initially armed with four Swedish-built 68-pounder smoothbore guns, one pair in each gun turret. The hand-operated turrets took a crew of 18 men one minute to complete a full revolution.

The ship had a complete waterline belt of wrought iron that was 4.5-inch (110 mm) thick. It completely covered the hull from the upper deck to 3 feet (0.9 m) below the waterline and was backed by 8 inches (203 mm) of wood. The armour protection of the turrets was quite elaborate. The inside of the turret was lined with 0.375 inches (9.5 mm) of iron boiler plate to which T-shaped beams were bolted. The space between the beams was filled with 10 inches (254 mm) of wood. This was covered by an iron lattice 0.75 inches (19 mm) thick that was covered in turn by 7 inches (178 mm) of wood. The 4.5-inch iron plates were bolted to the outside using bolts that ran through to the interior iron "skin". The area around the gun ports was reinforced by 3.5-inch (89 mm) plates to give a total thickness of 8 inches. The pilothouse was protected by 4.5 inches of iron backed by 11 inches (279 mm) of wood. One of the ship's major weaknesses was that the deck was virtually unprotected, consisting only of 0.5 inches (12.7 mm) of sheet iron covered by 3 inches (76 mm) of wood.

== Construction and career ==
The Danes signed the contract with Robert Napier and Sons for Rolf Krake named after Rolf Krake, a hero of Danish saga, on 28 August 1862. She was laid down in Govan later that year, launched on 6 May 1863, and commissioned upon her arrival in Denmark in July. Following her commissioning, Rolf Krake engaged in sea trials from 18 July to 20 August 1863.

The Rolf Krake saw service during the Second Schleswig War, during the battle of Dybbøl and the battle of Als.
