= Stig Grenov =

Danish Christian Democratic politician

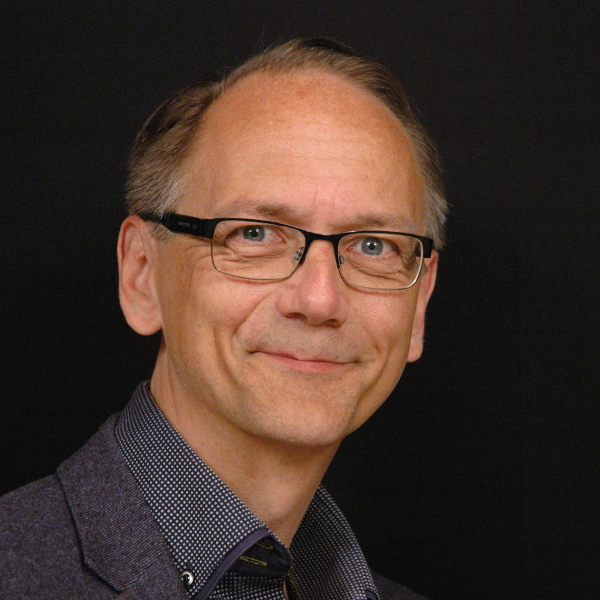

Leader of the Christian Democrats
- In office 27 October 2011 – 13 October 2019
- Preceded by: Egon Jakobsen
- Succeeded by: Isabella Arendt

Personal details
- Born: 15 March 1961 (age 64); Fredericia, Denmark

Stig Grenov (born 15 March 1961 in Copenhagen) is a Danish teacher and politician. On 27 October 2012 he was elected the chairman for the Christian Democrats, with no opposing candidates. He stepped down in 2019 and Isabella Arendt became the party's new leader.

== Background ==
Stig Grenov became a teacher in 1986, graduating from Hellerup Seminarium, with majors in math, physics, geography and history.

== Political career ==
Grenov has been a member of the Christian Democrats since 1990. When Per Ørum Jørgensen left the party in 2012 Egon Jakobsen became the ad interim leader of the party. Grenov was then elected the official new leader on 27 October 2012.

Grenov led the party in the 2015 Danish general election and was also set to lead the party in the 2019 election. However, on the first live debate among the party leaders Grenov fell ill and deputy leader Isabella Arendt took his place in the debate, attracting much attention. Grenov took leave of absence, leaving the party to be led by Arendt in the 2019 election. He officially stepped back on 13 October 2019 where Arendt became the new official leader of the party.

Political offices
Preceded by Egon Jakobsen (a.i.)	Leader of the Danish Christian Democrats; 2012–2019	Succeeded by Isabella Arendt
