= Søren Søndergaard (politician) =

Danish politician (born 1955)

Søren Søndergaard MEP
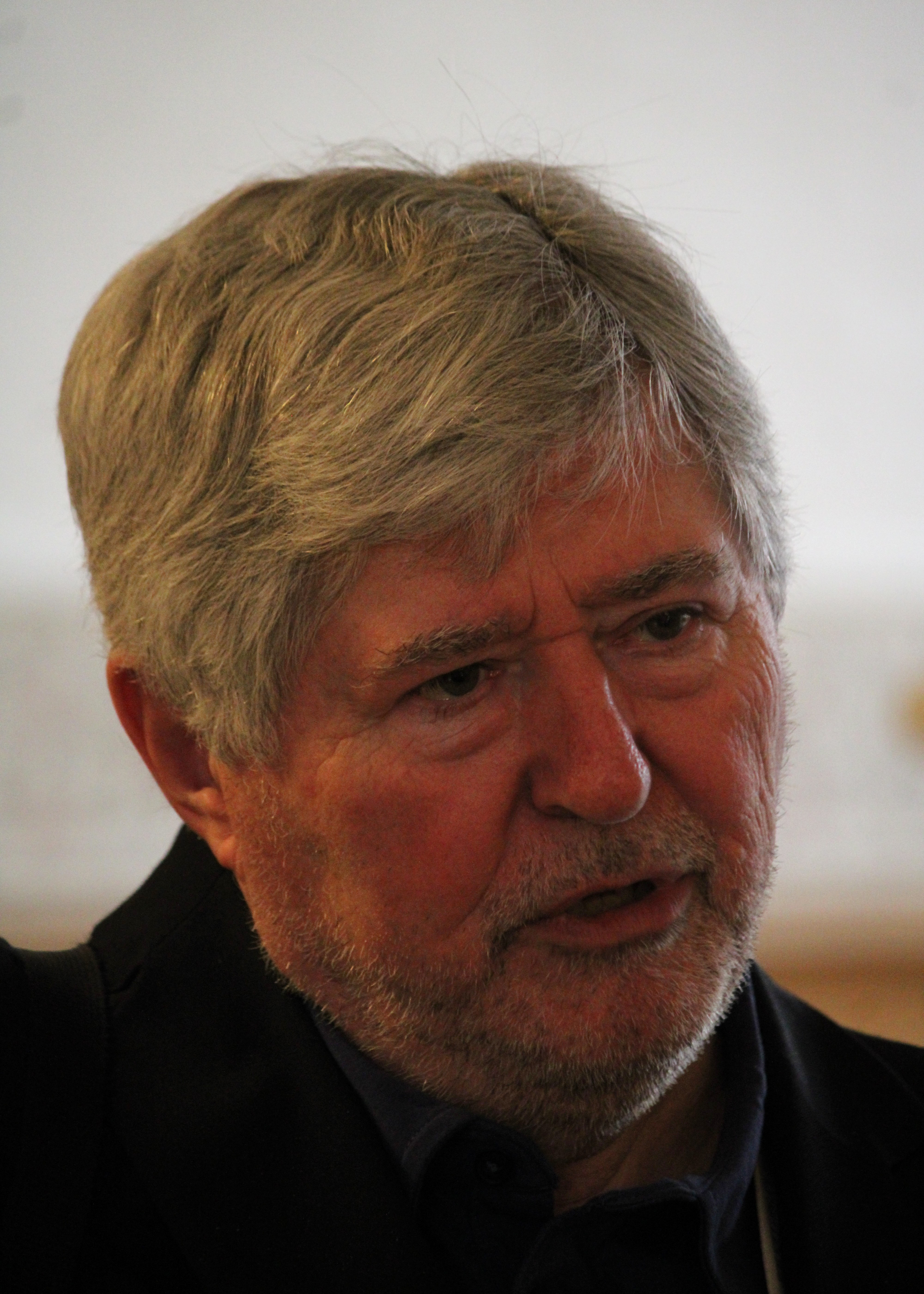
- Søndergaard in 2026

Member of the European Parliament
- In office 2007–2014
- Constituency: Denmark

Member of the Folketing
- Incumbent
- Assumed office 18 June 2015
- Constituency: Greater Copenhagen
- In office 21 September 1994 – 8 February 2005
- Constituency: Copenhagen

Personal details
- Born: 16 August 1955 (age 70) Kyndby, Denmark
- Party: Red–Green Alliance; People's Movement against the EU

Søren Bo Søndergaard (born 16 August 1955) is a Danish teacher, metalworker and politician, who is a member of the Folketing for the Red-Green Alliance. He was elected into parliament at the 2015 Danish general election, and previously served from 1994 to 2005. He was a Member of the European Parliament for the People's Movement against the EU and associated member of GUE/NGL from 2007 to 2014.

== Biography ==
Søren Søndergaard was born into the family of engineer Ernst Søndergaard and office assistant Birthe Søndergaard.

== Political career ==
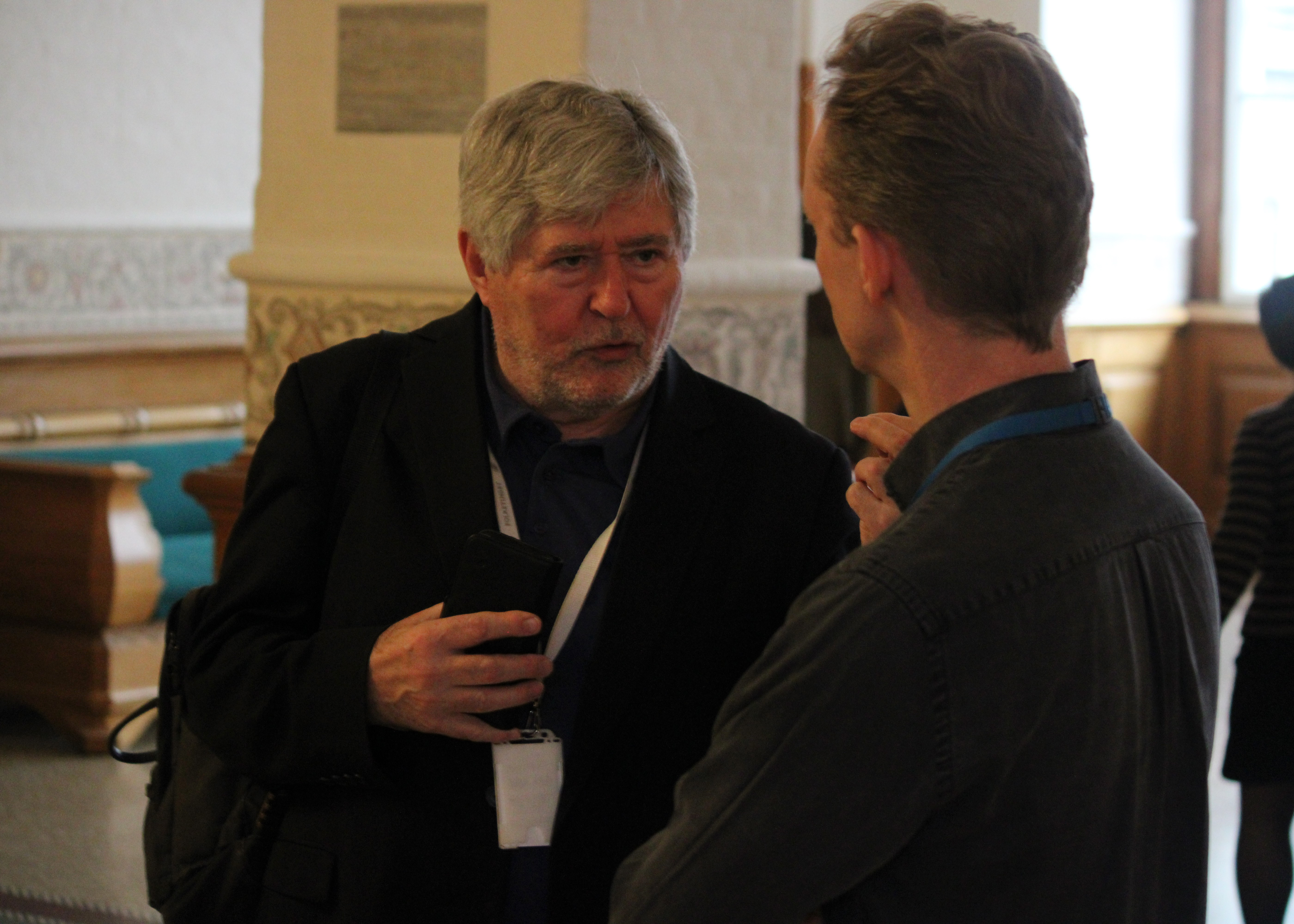
Søndergaard at Christiansborg in Copenhagen, 16 January 2026

Søndergaard was first elected into the Folketing at the 1994 election. During his first term in the Folketing, he became a member of the Parliamentary Assembly of the Council of Europe and a rapporteur on Albania and political prisoners in Azerbaijan. He was reelected in 1998 and 2001. From 2006 to 2007 he was a municipal council member of Gladsaxe Municipality. From 2007 to 2014 he was a member of the European Parliament. After the 2014 European Parliament election he failed to get reelected. In 2015 he ran for national parliament again and was elected through a constituency mandate in the Copenhagen Suburbs Constituency. He was reelected in 2019.
