= Christian Democrats (Denmark) =

Christian Democrats Kristendemokraterne
- Abbreviation: KD; K (Note: Official party letter on voting ballot until 2022)
- Chairman: Jeppe Hedaa
- Founded: 13 April 1970
- Headquarters: Vermlandsgade 51; 2300 København S
- Youth wing: Christian Democratic Youth
- Membership (2022): ▼2,226
- Ideology: Christian democracy Social conservatism
- Political position: Centre to centre-right
- European affiliation: European People's Party
- International affiliation: Centrist Democrat International
- Colours: Blue
- Folketing: 0 / 179 (Note: Only 175 of the 179 seats in the Danish Parliament, the Folketing, are obtainable by Danish political parties as Greenland and the Faroe Islands are assigned two seats each due to their status as territories in the Kingdom of Denmark.)
- European Parliament: 0 / 15
- Regional councils: 1 / 205
- Municipal councils: 10 / 2,436

Election symbol
- K

Website
- kd.dk

The Christian Democrats (Danish: Kristendemokraterne, KD) is a political party in Denmark. The party was founded in April 1970 as the Christian People's Party (Danish: Kristeligt Folkeparti, KrF) to oppose the liberalization of restrictions on pornography and the legalization of abortion. The party renamed itself to its current name in 2003. Originally, the party was not considered part of the European Christian-democratic tradition, and it was better known as a religious conservative party.

The Christian Democrats are a member of the European People's Party (EPP) and the Centrist Democrat International.

== History ==
The party was formed in 1970. Since its inception, the party has enjoyed an intermittent presence in the Parliament of Denmark, rarely winning much more than the two percent minimum required to gain seats under Denmark's proportional representation system, and frequently falling below the threshold, as has happened in every election from the 2005 parliamentary election onwards. Despite its small size, the party has served in a number of coalition governments. From 1982 to 1988, it was in coalition with the Liberal Party, Conservative People's Party and Centre Democrats; from 1993 to 1994, it served in government with the Social Democrats, the Social Liberals and the Centre Democrats.

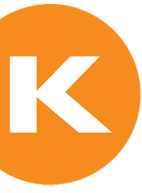

From 2002 to 2005, the party was led by Marianne Karlsmose. The name of the party was changed to the Christian Democrats in 2003. In October 2005, the party elected Bodil Kornbek as its new chairman. Her attempt to introduce a more secular centre-left profile had some success in the beginning, but the party once again failed to win seats in the 2007 elections. In October 2008, Kornbek was replaced by Bjarne Hartung Kirkegaard from its more conservative and religious wing.

In 2010, the Christian Democrats regained parliamentary representation when the Independent former Conservative MP Per Ørum Jørgensen joined the party. Since he was not formerly known for having expressed opinions based on Christianity, these events once more softened the religious character of the party.

On 30 June 2011, it was announced that the Christian Democrats had started cooperating with Fælleslisten, a single-issue party fighting for decentralization, especially in health care policy, with some success in regional and local elections. This means that candidates from the two parties appeared on a joint list at the 2011 Danish parliamentary election. The Christian Democrats had themselves taken a somewhat regionalist stance at a moment when Fælleslisten had surged in opinion polls.

In September 2012, Per Ørum Jørgensen resigned and subsequently left the party altogether in order to form a new party called the Democratic Party. Egon Jakobsen was appointed as interim chairman, and on 27 October 2012, the former deputy chairman Stig Grenov was elected as new chairman.

The 2015 general election marked the first election with Stig Grenov as chairman. Although Grenov managed to make his mark during the campaign, it only resulted in slightly over 1000 more votes than four years earlier.

The municipal and regional elections of 2017 saw a slight increase for the party, with the number of elected municipal council members rising from six to nine. Former national chairman Marianne Karlsmose was elected as a member of the regional council in the Central Denmark Region. However, the party failed to secure a mayor's position in Ringkøbing-Skjern Municipality.

Six days prior to the 2019 general election, Stig Grenov took temporary leave from his position as party chairman due to stress. Vice-chair Isabella Arendt stepped in as acting party chairman, initially for a month, but Grenov's leave was subsequently extended until the party's congress in October 2019, where Isabella Arendt formally became the new chairman.

Despite more than doubling the number of votes from 2015, the party was not represented in the Danish Parliament in the 2019 election. Less than 200 votes separated the party from securing a constituency mandate in West Jutland.

In 2021, Jens Rohde joined the party, resulting in its representation in the Folketing once again.

For the party, 2022 was characterized by several prominent figures retiring from national politics. In January, Kristian Andersen, the party's top vote-getter in the West Jutland constituency, announced that he would not run for the next parliament; the same was announced by Jens Rohde in May. Less than two weeks later, Isabella Arendt resigned from the chairmanship and left the party. Marianne Karlsmose then assumed the role of acting national chairman, and in October, she was officially elected as chairman without any opposing candidates. In the general election on November 1, the Christian Democrats received 0,5% of the votes and thus did not enter the Folketing. On November 12, Karlsmose resigned from the chairman position. Instead of electing a new chairman, the party's executive committee agreed to have Karlsmose replaced by organizational and political vice-chairmen, Jesper Housgaard and Henrik Hjortshøj, respectively, until the party's annual meeting in 2023. However, an extraordinary congress was held in March 2023, where Jeppe Hedaa was elected as the new national chairman.

== Christian Democratic politicians ==
=== Party chairmen ===
- Jacob Christensen: 1970–1973
- Jens Møller: 1973–1979
- Flemming Kofod-Svendsen: 1979–1990
- Jann Sjursen: 1990–2002
- Marianne Karlsmose: 2002–2005
- Bodil Kornbek: 2005–2008
- Bjarne Hartung Kirkegaard: 2008–2011
- Per Ørum Jørgensen: 2011–2012
- Egon Jakobsen: 2012 (a.i.)
- Stig Grenov: 2012–2019
- Isabella Arendt: 2019–2022
- Marianne Karlsmose: 2022
- Henrik Hjortshøj & Jesper Housgaard: 2022–2023 (a.i.)
- Jeppe Hedaa: 2023–present

=== Ministers ===
- Christian Christensen: Minister for the Environment and Nordic Cooperation (1982–88).
- Flemming Kofod-Svendsen: Minister for Housing (1987–88). Minister for Housing, Nordic Cooperation and Baltic Sea Questions (1993–1994).
- Jann Sjursen: Minister of Energy (1993–1994).

== Election results ==
=== Parliament ===
Date	Votes			Seats	
Date	#	%	± pp	#	±
1971	57,072	1.9%	+1.9	0 / 179	New
1973	123,573	4.0%	+2.1	7 / 179	▲7
1975	162,734	5.3%	+1.3	9 / 179	▲2
1977	106,082	3.4%	−1.9	6 / 179	▼3
1979	82,133	2.6%	−0.8	5 / 179	▼1
1981	72,174	2.3%	−0.3	4 / 179	▼1
1984	91,623	2.7%	+0.4	5 / 179	▲1
1987	79,664	2.4%	−0.3	4 / 179	▼1
1988	68,047	2.0%	−0.4	4 / 179	0
1990	74,174	2.3%	+0.3	4 / 179	0
1994	61,507	1.9%	−0.4	0 / 179	▼4
1998	85,656	2.5%	+0.6	4 / 179	▲4
2001	78,793	2.3%	−0.2	4 / 179	0
2005	58,071	1.7%	−0.6	0 / 179	▼4
2007	30,013	0.9%	−0.8	0 / 179	0
2011	28,070	0.8%	−0.1	0 / 179	0
2015	29,077	0.8%	0.0	0 / 179	0
2019	61,215	1.7%	+0.9	0 / 179	0
2022	18,276	0.5%	−1.2	0 / 179	0

=== Local elections ===
Municipal elections

Date	Seats	
Date	#	±
1974	37 / 4,735	New
1978	28 / 4,759	▼9
1981	27 / 4,769	▼1
1985	33 / 4,773	▲6
1989	45 / 4,737	▲12
1993	32 / 4,703	▼13
1997	30 / 4,685	▼2
2001	31 / 4,647	▲1
2005	15 / 2,522	▼16
2009	6 / 2,468	▼9
2013	6 / 2,444	0
2017	9 / 2,432	▲3
2021	12 / 2,436	▲3

Regional elections

Date	Votes	Seats	
Date	Votes	#	±
1974	71.787	9 / 370	New
1978	52.201	5 / 370	▼4
1981	46.425	6 / 370	▲1
1985	47.847	6 / 374	0
1989	49,084	7 / 374	▲1
1993	44,938	5 / 374	▼2
1997	44,154	2 / 374	▼3
2001	55,683	4 / 374	▲2
2005	47,862	2 / 205	▼2
2009	23,170	0 / 205	▼2
2013	25,281	0 / 205	0
2017	26,082	1 / 205	▲1
2021	35,168	1 / 205	0

=== European Parliament ===
Date	Votes			Seats	
Date	#	%	± pp	#	±
1979	30,985	1.8%	+1.8	0 / 15	New
1984	54,624	2.7%	+2.7	0 / 15	0
1989	47,768	2.7%	0.0	0 / 16	0
1994	22,986	1.1%	−1.6	0 / 16	0
1999	39,128	2.0%	+0.9	0 / 16	0
2004	24,286	1.3%	−0.7	0 / 14	0
2009–present	did not run.				
