= Dorte Bennedsen =

Danish theologian and politician (1938–2016)

Member of the Folketing for the Copenhagen Municipality
- In office 9 January 1975 – 20 November 2001

Minister of Education
- In office 5 January 1979 – 10 September 1982
- Monarch: Margrethe II
- Prime Minister: Anker Jørgensen
- Preceded by: Ritt Bjerregaard
- Succeeded by: Bertel Haarder

Minister for Ecclesiastical Affairs
- In office 11 October 1971 – 19 December 1973
- Monarchs: Frederik IX (1971–1972); Margrethe II (1972–1973)
- Prime Minister: Jens Otto Krag (1971–1972); Anker Jørgensen (1972–1973)
- Preceded by: Arne Fog Pedersen
- Succeeded by: Kresten Damsgaard

Personal details
- Born: Dorte Marianne Koch; 2 July 1938 Frederiksberg, Denmark
- Died: 17 March 2016 (aged 77) Frederiksberg, Denmark
- Citizenship: Denmark
- Party: Social Democrats
- Spouse: Jorgen Bennedsen (m. 1961–2016)
- Children: 3
- Education: Metropolitanskolen
- Alma mater: University of Copenhagen
- Occupation: Theologian

Dorte Marianne Bennedsen (2 July 1938 – 17 March 2016) was a Danish theologian and politician of the Social Democrats. She served as the Minister for Ecclesiastical Affairs between October 1971 and December 1973 and was the Minister of Education from January 1979 to September 1982. Bennedsen was Holmen Church's auxiliary pastor from 1965 to 1968 and was chair of the Danish Association for Nordic Collaboration between 1984 and 1999. She was a member of the Folketing from January 1975 until she stood down in November 2001.

== Biography ==
On 2 July 1938, Bennedsen was born Dorte Koch in Frederiksberg, Denmark. She was the daughter of the Hans Harald Koch, the Doctor of Divinity and former Minister for Ecclesiastical Affairs, and the theologican minister Bodil Thastrum Koch. Bennedsen had three elder siblings and she was brought up in Østerbro. Her father called her Dorte and was educated at Emdrupborg School and then attended the Metropolitanskolen, where she passed the classical language student examination. Bennedshen graduated from the University of Copenhagen with a Master of Science degree in divinity in 1964. She thus became a cand.theol. and was Holmen Church's auxiliary pastor from 1965 to 1968, even though she had not been originally intending to become a priest until persuaded to become one.

Bennedsen joined the Social Democrats in 1964, and she served as general secretary of the Danish Youth Council from 1968 to 1971, becoming the first woman to hold the position. She also performed as a priest on special occasions from thereon. In the same period, Bennedsen was a member of the Social Democrats' management committee for the 2nd constituency, Frederiksberg. She was a member of the Danish Association for International Cooperation's management committee between 1969 and 1971. Between 1968 and 1971, Bennedsen served as a member of UNESCO's national commission. She was a member of Mellemfolkeligt Samvirke's board from 1969 to 1971. She was part of the municipal council of Frederiksberg from 1970 to 1974 but she was put on leave from her post between 11 October 1971 and 19 December 1973, because Jens Otto Krag, the Prime Minister, had appointed her the Minister for Ecclesiastical Affairs during his third ministry. Bennedsen also served under future Prime Minister Anker Jørgensen from 1972 to 1973.

She ran for election to the Folketing for a seat in the Gentofte Municipality in the 1973 Danish general election but she failed to get elected. Bennedsen was able to get elected to serve the Copenhagen Municipality two years later, and began representing the municipality at the Christiansborg Palace on 9 January 1975. Between 1974 and 1979, she was chair of The Danish Consumer Council, working for consumer interests in quality and their viewpoints, and she served as vice-chair of the Parliamentary Social Democratic Party from 1977 to 1979. Bennedsen sat on the Danish Energy Agency council in 1976, the Library Commission from 1976 to 1979, and on the Radio Council between 1977 and 1979. She was appointed Minister of Education on 5 January 1979 and she remained in the post until she resigned on 10 September 1982. Bennedsen was concerned with upper-secondary and vocational education reforms, and insisted when youth unemployment was at high levels, the young should receive an education.

In 1984, she was made chair of the Danish Association for Nordic Collaboration and a member of the Nordic Council. Bennedsen was appointed chair of the Municipal Affairs committee of the Folketing from 1987 to 1988 and both the parliament's Naturalisation Committee and Indigenous Rights Committee in 1998. She insisted that Denmark's foreign policy not be restricted in wake of immigration to the country in the late 1990s. She stood down as chair of the Danish Association for Nordic Collaboration in 1999. Bennedsen was a member of the Road Safety Commission from 1995 to 2001 and was appointed its chairman during 2000. She stood down as a member of the Folketing on 20 November 2001 when Anders Fogh Rasmussen replaced Poul Nyrup Rasmussen as Prime Minister, and she was made a member of the Supreme Court the following year.

== Personal life ==
She was married to the Statens Serum Institut physician Jorgen Bennedsen from 29 September 1961 and the couple had three children. Bennedsen died on 17 March 2016 in Frederiksberg and was buried at Frederiksberg Church on the afternoon of 22 March.
