= Christian Democratic Youth =

The Christian Democratic Youth (Danish: Kristendemokratisk Ungdom), formerly the Youth of the Christian People's Party (Kristelig Folkepartis Ungdom), is the youth league of the Christian Democrats, a political party in Denmark.
