= Bodil Kornbek =

Danish politician

Bodil Holmgren Kornbek (born 10 August 1961) is a Danish politician who on 2 October 2008 became a member of the Social Democrats. Before that she was leader of the Christian Democrats. She was a Member of Parliament from 2001 to 2005 and was elected as party Chairman in 2005.

Political offices
Preceded by Marianne Karlsmose	Leader of the Danish Christian Democrats; 2005–2008	Succeeded by Bjarne Hartung Kirkegaard
