= Flemming Kofod-Svendsen =

Danish politician and ordained minister (born 1944)

Flemming Kofod-Svendsen (born 21 March 1944 in Aakirkeby) is an ordained minister in the Lutheran Church of Denmark (parish priest in Birkerød 1976-2011) and a Danish politician representing the Christian People's Party.

== Biography ==
Kofod-Svendsen was party leader from 1979 till 1990, when he was succeeded by Jann Sjursen. He was a member of parliament from 1984 till 1993 and from 1998 till 2001. During his leadership the party participated in the first two coalition governments of the conservative prime minister Poul Schlüter from 1982 till 1987 and from 1987 till 1988. In the first term the Christian People's Party provided the minister of Environmental Affairs in the person of Christian Christensen, he was also minister for Nordic Affairs. In the second term Christensen stayed and Fleming Kofod-Svendsen also entered the government, as Minister of Housing. In 1993 Fleming Kofod-Svendsen and Jann Sjursen became ministers in the 1993-1994 government of Poul Nyrup Rasmussen. Kofod-Svendsen was Minister of Housing and of Nordic Affairs in this government.
