= 2019 Danish general election =

- 5 June 2019
- All 179 seats in the Folketing; 90 seats needed for a majority
- Turnout: 84.6% (▼1.29pp)
Party	Leader	Vote %	Seats	+/–
Elected in Denmark proper
Social Democrats	Mette Frederiksen	25.90	48	+1
Venstre	Lars Løkke Rasmussen	23.39	43	+9
DPP	Kristian Thulesen Dahl	8.74	16	−21
Social Liberals	Morten Østergaard	8.63	16	+8
SF	Pia Olsen Dyhr	7.71	14	+7
Red–Green	Pernille Skipper (Note: Formally, the Red-Green Alliance have collective leadership, but Skipper was their political spokesperson, and de facto leader of the party.)	6.94	13	−1
Conservatives	Søren Pape Poulsen	6.62	12	+6
The Alternative	Uffe Elbæk	2.95	5	−4
New Right	Pernille Vermund	2.36	4	New
Liberal Alliance	Anders Samuelsen	2.33	4	−9
Elected in the Faroe Islands
Union	Bárður á Steig Nielsen	28.32	1	+1
Social Democratic	Aksel V. Johannesen	25.55	1	0
Elected in Greenland
Inuit Ataqatigiit	Múte Bourup Egede	34.35	1	0
Siumut	Kim Kielsen	30.33	1	0
This lists parties that won seats. See the complete results below.

Government before	Government after election
Løkke Rasmussen III; V–LA–K	Frederiksen I Social Democrats

General elections were held in the Kingdom of Denmark on 5 June 2019 to elect all 179 members of the Folketing; 175 in Denmark proper, two in the Faroe Islands and two in Greenland. The elections took place ten days after the European Parliament elections.

The elections resulted in a victory for the "red bloc", comprising parties that supported the Social Democrats' leader Mette Frederiksen as candidate for prime minister. The "red bloc", consisting of the Social Democrats, the Social Liberals, Socialist People's Party, the Red–Green Alliance, the Faroese Social Democratic Party and the Greenlandic Siumut, won 93 of the 179 seats, securing a parliamentary majority. Meanwhile, the incumbent governing coalition, consisting of Venstre, the Liberal Alliance and the Conservative People's Party whilst receiving parliamentary support from the Danish People's Party and Nunatta Qitornai, was reduced to 76 seats (including the Venstre-affiliated Union Party in the Faroe Islands).

On 6 June, incumbent Prime Minister Lars Løkke Rasmussen of the centre-right liberal Venstre party tendered his resignation, and Frederiksen was tasked with forming a new government. On 25 June, Frederiksen reached an agreement with the red bloc, and on 27 June she was appointed prime minister and her government, a single-party Social Democratic government, took office.

== Background ==
The 2015 general election resulted in a narrow majority for the Danish People's Party, Venstre, Liberal Alliance and the Conservative People's Party, colloquially known as the "blue bloc". They won 90 seats in the Folketing versus 89 seats for the remaining parties, all belonging to the "red bloc". Ten days later, Lars Løkke Rasmussen, the leader of Venstre, became Prime Minister, when Venstre formed a single-party government supported by the remaining parties in the "blue bloc". In November 2016, Rasmussen formed a new government, now a coalition with Liberal Alliance, and the Conservative People's Party.

== Electoral system ==
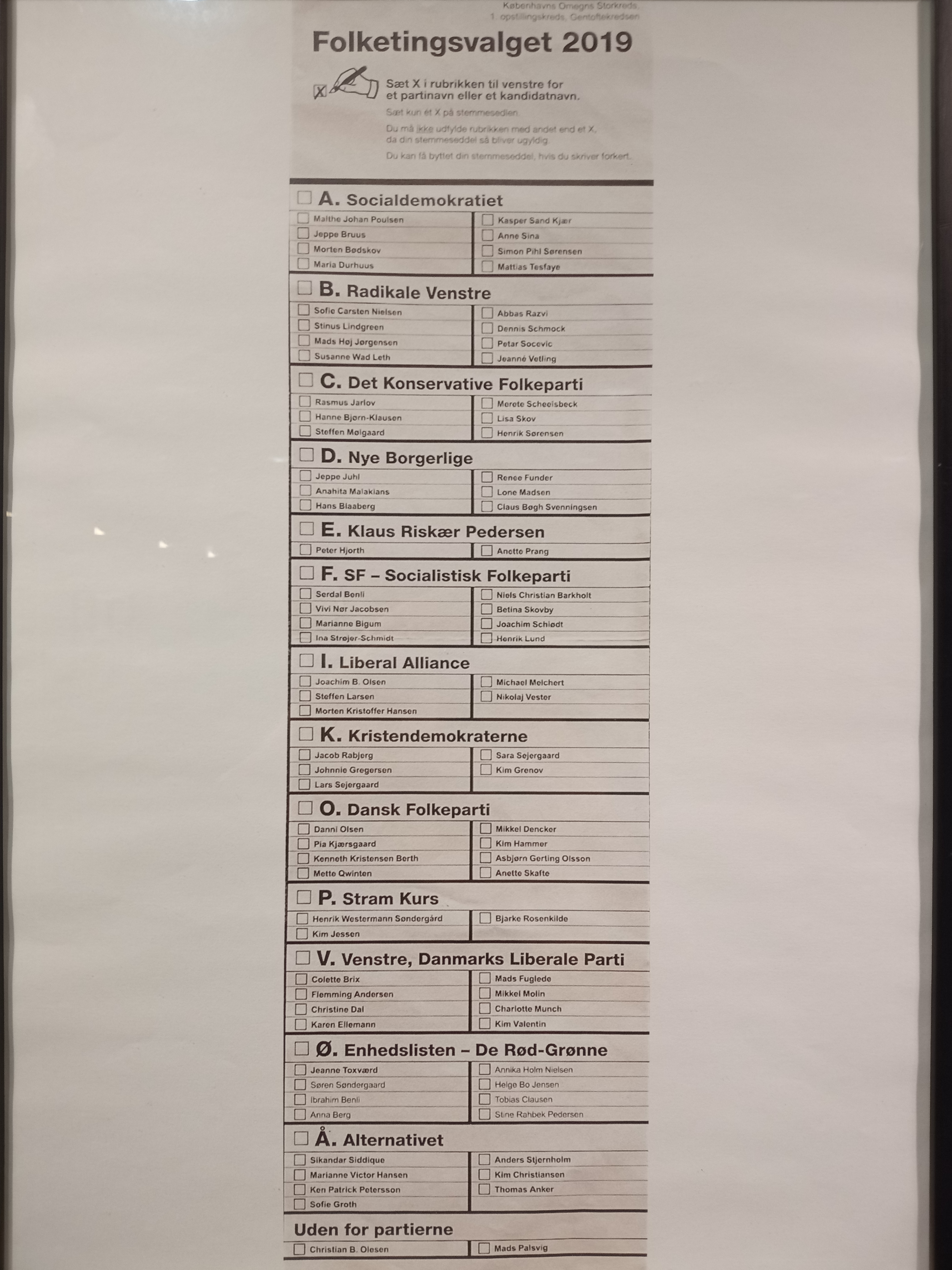
Ballot paper

Of the 179 members of the Folketing, 175 are elected in Denmark proper, two in Faroe Islands and two in Greenland. In Denmark there are ten multi-member constituencies containing a total of 135 seats directly elected by proportional representation, with seats allocated using a modified version of the Sainte-Laguë method and Hare quota. An additional 40 leveling seats are used to address any imbalance in the distribution of the constituency seats, and are distributed among all parties that cross the 2% election threshold, according to their national vote share.

Voters could choose between casting a personal vote for a candidate, or voting for a political party. Most parties primarily choose a "side-by-side" option for choosing candidates, where the candidates with the most personal votes are appointed; however the Red–Green Alliance, as well as other parties in a small number of constituencies (storkredser) use a "party list" option, where the prioritized candidates are predetermined, with a candidate only being able to skip to the front of the list if they receive a substantial fraction (Droop quota) of the party's personal votes in the constituency.

According to the Danish Constitution, the 2019 election was required to be held no later than 17 June 2019, as the previous elections were held on 18 June 2015. The Prime Minister is able to call the election at any date, provided that date is no later than four years from the previous election, and this is cited as a tactical advantage for the sitting government.

For a new party to become eligible to participate in the election, they must be supported by a number of voters corresponding to 1/175 of all valid votes cast in the previous election. A new party registering to contest the 2019 elections required 20,109 voter declarations to participate.

== Participating parties ==
=== Denmark ===
All nine parties that held seats in the Folketing contested the elections. Four other parties also gained ballot access: three new parties on the right and the Christian Democrats, who lost representation in the 2005 election. In October 2016, New Right, a new right-wing party, became eligible to run in the election, and a year later, in October 2017, the Christian Democrats did likewise. The latter had participated in every election from 1971 to 2005.

In February 2019, the party Klaus Riskær Pedersen, named after its founder, collected the necessary voter declarations and became eligible too, despite, breaking the rules for collection of declarations. Riskær Pedersen found a way to circumvent a 7-day "thinking period" between a voter noting their support for a party and then confirming their signature in the online collection system. Even though the rules did not allow this, they contained no possibility of sanctions. Following this, all political parties in the Folketing agreed to close the loophole and build a new portal for declarations, expected to be available in the end 2020.

In April 2019, following unrest at Nørrebro caused by demonstrations by anti-Islamist politician Rasmus Paludan, his party Hard Line managed to collect the required signatures. Paludan and his party have been surrounded with controversy, with demonstrations containing activities like throwing the Quran around, burning the Quran and harassing Muslims. In April 2019, Paludan was sentenced for violating a paragraph in the Danish Penal Code colloquially known as the "racism paragraph". He had also circumvented the "thinking period" in the same manner as Riskær Pedersen.

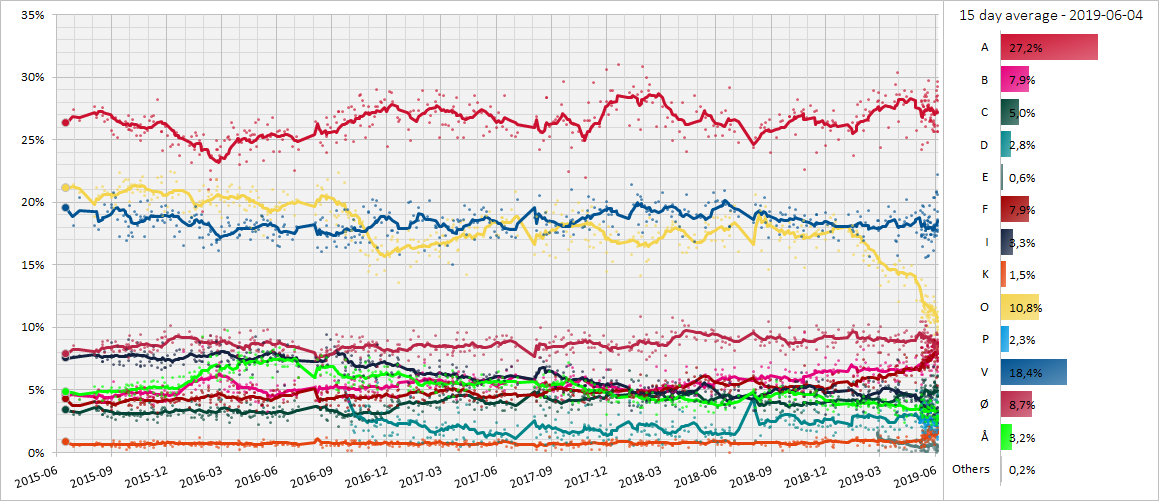
The 30-day average trendline of the Danish opinion polls towards the general election in 2019. Each line corresponds to a political party. The date range for these opinion polls are from June 2015, when the previous parliamentary election occurred, to May 2019. The 15-day average as of 4 June is also shown.

Danish parties contesting the elections
Party		Leader	Last election	
A	Social Democrats	Mette Frederiksen	26.3%	47 seats
O	Danish People's Party	Kristian Thulesen Dahl	21.1%	37 seats
V	Venstre	Lars Løkke Rasmussen	19.5%	34 seats
Ø	Red–Green Alliance	Pernille Skipper	7.8%	14 seats
I	Liberal Alliance	Anders Samulesen	7.5%	13 seats
Å	The Alternative	Uffe Elbæk	4.8%	9 seats
B	Social Liberals	Morten Østergaard	4.6%	8 seats
F	Socialist People's Party	Pia Olsen Dyhr	4.2%	7 seats
C	Conservative	Søren Pape Poulsen	3.4%	6 seats
K	Christian Democrats	Isabella Arendt (acting) (Note: On 13 May 2019, Arendt became acting chairman when Stig Grenov took a leave of absence due to stress.)	0.8%	–
D	New Right	Pernille Vermund	Did not contest	
E	Klaus Riskær Pedersen	Klaus Riskær Pedersen	Did not contest	
P	Hard Line	Rasmus Paludan	Did not contest	

=== Faroe Islands ===
All parties represented in the Løgting were eligible to contest the elections, although the Centre Party decided not to participate.

Faroese parties contesting the elections
Party		Leader	Last election	
E	Republic	Høgni Hoydal	24.5%	1 seat
C	Social Democratic Party	Aksel V. Johannesen	24.3%	1 seat
B	Union Party	Bárður á Steig Nielsen	23.5%	–
A	People's Party	Jørgen Niclasen	18.7%	–
F	Progress	Poul Michelsen	3.2%	–
D	Self-Government Party	Jógvan Skorheim	1.7%	–

=== Greenland ===
All parties represented in the Parliament of Greenland were eligible to participate in the elections. In the previous elections, Aleqa Hammond won a seat as a Siumut candidate, but was expelled from the party in August 2016 following a case about misuse of funds from the Folketing. In April 2018, she joined Nunatta Qitornai.

Greenlandic parties contesting the elections
Party		Leader (Note: None of the party leaders are candidates in the election.)	Last election	
S	Siumut	Kim Kielsen	38.0%	1 seat
IA	Inuit Ataqatigiit	Múte Bourup Egede	38.3%	1 seat
D	Democrats	Niels Thomsen (Note: On leave until 30 June 2019)	9.0%	–
A	Atassut	Siverth K. Heilmann	7.4%	–
PN	Partii Naleraq	Hans Enoksen	5.1%	–
SA	Cooperation Party	Michael Rosing	Did not contest	
NQ	Nunatta Qitornai	Vittus Qujaukitsoq	Did not contest	

== Campaign ==
=== Early statements ===
In October 2017 New Right, a new right-wing political party that became eligible to run in October 2016, listed three demands for a candidate for prime minister to receive their support. All three demands were tightenings of the immigration policy.

On 4 June 2018, the Social Democrats, the largest opposition party, stated that if they were to win the election, they wished to form a single-party government led by their leader Mette Frederiksen, i.e. not as a coalition government with the Social Liberal Party. This was done in order to both pursue traditional centre-left issues, and to have a strict immigration policy. Morten Østergaard, the leader of the Social Liberal Party, responded by saying that if the Social Democrats wanted their support, they would also need to give them concessions. The message was welcomed by the anti-immigration Danish People's Party, which supported the centre-right party Venstre in the election. Their leader Kristian Thulesen Dahl, said that this would ensure that they could get through with their immigration policy, no matter which party won the election.

On 26 June 2018, The Alternative, which traditionally is regarded as belonging to the "red bloc", stated that they no longer would support Mette Frederiksen as candidate to become prime minister. Instead, they would support their own political leader, Uffe Elbæk, as a way to "pull their seats from the equation" after the election. This was done because they did not regard the other parties' ambitions concerning climate change to be sufficient. The move was met with criticism, as Elbæk's chances were slim, and it could risk keeping Lars Løkke Rasmussen as prime minister.

=== Campaign begins ===
The election campaign started on 7 May 2019, when Prime Minister Lars Løkke Rasmussen announced that the election would be held on 5 June, which is Constitution Day. At the time of announcement, Mette Frederiksen, leader of the Social Democrats and contender to the office of prime minister, was sick and unable to participate in the televised debates between all party leaders held on the same evening. Instead, former minister Nicolai Wammen represented the Social Democrats in the debates. Frederiksen started campaigning on 10 May.

Shortly before the election was called, Hard Line, a new far-right party which wants to ban Islam, became eligible to participate in the election. In the beginning of the campaign, much attention was given to the party, and especially their leader Rasmus Paludan. Both Løkke Rasmussen and Frederiksen said that they would not base a government on their potential seats, and other party leaders rejected to cooperate with the party, should they gain seats. While Venstre, Liberal Alliance and the Conservatives said that Hard Line should not be considered as part of the "blue bloc" when committee seats are distributed, the Danish People's Party were open to that possibility. On 8 May, when Paludan was guest in a TV-show, he called Mimi Jakobsen, a former politician, a "Nazi pig", shortly after she had said that Paludan's thoughts were "close to Nazi a mindset". Jakobsen threatened to sue, but ultimately decided not to. On 9 May media revealed that Paludan had been given a restraining order due to stalking, with more details following a week later. From 2010 to 2013 he had been stalking a 24-year-old man he met while studying Latin, and in 2015 he was sentenced a fine for offending a police officer who handled the case. Paludan declined to comment, saying it regarded his private life.

On 13 May the Christian Democrats announced that their leader Stig Grenov would take a leave of absence due to stress, and that deputy chairman Isabella Arendt would become acting chairman. On the first evening of the campaign, Grenov had participated in a televised debate on DR1 and was supposed to participate in another debate at TV 2, but became ill and was replaced by Arendt. She was hailed by her performance in that debate, dubbed the "substitute from heaven". (Note: This nickname was a reference to Karsten Hønge from SF, who in 2014 was given the nickname "substitute from hell".) Following the change in chairman, media speculated if the change was a tactical move, as Arendt was perceived to have a broader appeal than Grenov, and as a young woman could improve the party's image, but both Grenov and Arendt denied that tactics played a role in the decision. On 28 May, Grenov announced that he would step down as chairman at the party's October conference, and supported Arendt as new chairman.

=== Talks about a Social Democrats–Venstre coalition government ===
On 16 May, Løkke Rasmussen published a book, in which he was open to a possible coalition government between the Social Democratic Party and Venstre (Danish: SV-regering). He said that he offered to be the "grown up", as a coalition across the political middle would be better than a government depending on the outermost political wings, but stressed that he and Venstre still campaigned for a centre-right government. The announcement was remarkable and regarded as a gamble; Løkke Rasmussen himself called it a "game changer". Prominent figures in Venstre, among those deputy chairman and Minister of Finance Kristian Jensen and Minister for Immigration Inger Støjberg, were deeply critical of the idea, while others supported the idea. Denmark had an SV government between 1978 and 1979, Ministeriet Anker Jørgensen III. That government, which was led by Prime Minister Anker Jørgensen of the Social Democrats, was widely regarded as a fiasco.

The idea of an SV-government were immediately rejected by Frederiksen, who said that the political differences are too big, and reiterated that the Social Democrats wished to form a single-party government after the election. Among the parties in the sitting government, Søren Pape Poulsen, leader of the Conservative, said that they could not support an SV-government, and Anders Samuelsen, leader of the Liberal Alliance, said that he was worried about the turn that the election campaign had taken, and offered free membership of Liberal Alliance for all members of Venstre. On the other hand, the Social Liberals and the Danish People's Party welcomed the announcement, while the Red–Green Alliance refused to support such a government. Pia Kjærsgaard, speaker of the Folketing and former leader of the Danish People's Party, called for a majority government between Venstre, the Social Democrats, and the Danish People's Party, as an SV-government would be unstable and could give the Social Liberals too much influence on the immigration policy.

On 4 June, the day before the election, Løkke Rasmussen gave up on his plans to form a centre-right government, saying it was no longer "realistic". He instead made it his first priority to create a government across the political middle, in order to keep the right- and left wing away from power. He did not state which parties should be in such a government. The announcement was met with stark opposition from his coalition partners. Pape Poulsen rejected taking part in such a government, questioning what the political foundation should be while Samuelsen said that Løkke Rasmussen had "let down" the civic-liberal Denmark. Kristian Thulesen Dahl, leader of the Danish People's Party, said that it was paramount to them to take part in such a cooperation, so the Social Liberals and The Alternative did not influence it. He demanded that Løkke Rasmussen choose between the Social Liberals and the Danish People's Party. Frederiksen once again rejected the idea and said that "voters must be confused" as Løkke proposed three different governments during the election campaign. Morten Østergaard, leader of the Social Liberals, said that he would be supporting Frederiksen as prime minister, and that he could not support Løkke Rasmussen. The day prior, the Social Liberals' vice chairman, Martin Lidegaard, had said that a government with both Venstre, the Social Democrats and the Social Liberals would be the "dream scenario".

== Results ==
Overall the election was a win for the "red bloc" – the parties that supported Mette Frederiksen, leader of the Social Democrats, as prime minister. In total, the Social Democrats, the Social Liberals, Socialist People's Party and the Red–Green Alliance won 91 seats. Green party The Alternative chose to go into opposition as a "green bloc".

The Social Democrats defended their position as the largest party, and won an additional seat despite a slightly reduced voter share. They were closely followed by Venstre, who saw the largest gains in seats, picking up an extra nine. In the "blue bloc", only Venstre and the Conservative People's Party saw gains, the latter doubling their seats. The Danish People's Party's vote share fell by 12.4 percentage points (pp), well over half of their support. Leader Kristian Thulesen Dahl speculated that the bad result was due to an extraordinary good election in 2015, and that some voters felt they could "gain [their] policy elsewhere". The Liberal Alliance saw their vote share fall by over two-thirds and became the smallest party in the Folketing, only 0.3pp above the 2% election threshold. Their leader Anders Samuelsen was not reelected and he subsequently resigned as leader, succeeded by Alex Vanopslagh.

Of the new parties, only New Right won seats, with Hard Line, the Christian Democrats and Klaus Riskær Pedersen failing to cross the national 2% threshold, although the Christian Democrats were within 200 votes of winning a direct seat in the western Jutland constituency. On election night, Klaus Riskær Pedersen announced that he would dissolve his party.

In the Faroe Islands, Republic (which had finished first in the 2015 elections) dropped to fourth place and lost their seat. The Union Party replaced them as the first party while the Social Democratic Party finished in second place again, retaining their seat. In Greenland, the result was a repeat of the 2015 elections, with Inuit Ataqatigiit and Siumut winning the two seats. Siumut regained parliamentary representation after their previous MP, Aleqa Hammond, was expelled from the party in 2016. Hammond later joined Nunatta Qitornai, which finished fourth and failed to win a seat.

Popular vote in Denmark
A	25.9%
V	23.4%
O	8.7%
B	8.6%
F	7.7%
Ø	6.9%
C	6.6%
Å	3.0%
D	2.4%
I	2.3%
P	1.8%
K	1.7%
E	0.8%
Others	0.1%

Largest party in each nomination district.

Party	Votes	%	Seats	+/–
Denmark proper
Social Democrats	914,882	25.90	48	+1
Venstre	826,161	23.39	43	+9
Danish People's Party	308,513	8.74	16	–21
Danish Social Liberal Party	304,714	8.63	16	+8
Socialist People's Party	272,304	7.71	14	+7
Red–Green Alliance	245,100	6.94	13	–1
Conservative People's Party	233,865	6.62	12	+6
The Alternative	104,278	2.95	5	–4
New Right	83,201	2.36	4	New
Liberal Alliance	82,270	2.33	4	–9
Stram Kurs	63,114	1.79	0	New
Christian Democrats	60,944	1.73	0	0
Klaus Riskær Pedersen	29,600	0.84	0	New
Independents	2,774	0.08	0	0
Total	3,531,720	100.00	175	0
Valid votes	3,531,720	98.94		
Invalid votes	10,019	0.28		
Blank votes	27,782	0.78		
Total votes	3,569,521	100.00		
Registered voters/turnout	4,219,537	84.60		
Faroe Islands
Union Party	7,360	28.32	1	+1
Social Democratic Party	6,640	25.55	1	0
People's Party	6,181	23.79	0	0
Republic	4,832	18.60	0	–1
Progress	638	2.46	0	0
Self-Government	334	1.29	0	0
Total	25,985	100.00	2	0
Valid votes	25,985	99.16		
Invalid/blank votes	220	0.84		
Total votes	26,205	100.00		
Registered voters/turnout	37,264	70.32		
Greenland
Inuit Ataqatigiit	6,867	34.35	1	0
Siumut	6,063	30.33	1	0
Democrats	2,258	11.30	0	0
Nunatta Qitornai	1,622	8.11	0	New
Partii Naleraq	1,564	7.82	0	0
Atassut	1,098	5.49	0	0
Cooperation Party	518	2.59	0	New
Total	19,990	100.00	2	0
Valid votes	19,990	97.16		
Invalid/blank votes	585	2.84		
Total votes	20,575	100.00		
Registered voters/turnout	41,344	49.77		
Source: Statistics Denmark, Kringvarp Føroya, Qinersineq

=== By constituency ===
Constituency	A	B	C	D	E	F	I	K	O	P	V	Ø	Å
Copenhagen	17.2	16.4	5.3	1.4	1.0	11.5	2.6	0.7	4.2	1.3	15.0	16.8	6.5
Greater Copenhagen	25.8	10.9	9.4	2.3	0.8	9.4	2.6	0.9	8.2	1.9	17.2	7.2	3.1
North Zealand	21.3	11.2	11.2	3.3	1.0	6.9	3.3	1.1	7.5	1.5	23.4	5.6	2.7
Bornholm	34.0	3.3	1.8	1.7	0.9	4.3	1.0	4.1	10.4	1.9	25.3	8.1	3.3
Zealand	28.2	5.8	5.8	2.6	1.0	8.8	1.8	0.8	10.9	2.7	24.3	5.2	2.0
Funen	30.2	7.3	6.2	1.9	0.8	6.7	1.9	1.1	8.9	1.9	23.4	6.8	3.0
South Jutland	26.1	5.9	5.1	4.1	0.7	5.2	2.1	2.2	12.5	1.8	28.5	4.1	1.6
East Jutland	25.8	9.9	5.7	2.0	0.7	8.2	2.9	2.1	7.8	1.5	22.6	7.1	3.4
West Jutland	24.6	5.3	9.2	1.7	0.6	6.2	2.2	5.3	8.4	1.6	29.8	3.4	1.7
North Jutland	33.9	5.1	4.9	2.0	0.8	5.4	1.9	1.6	9.5	1.7	26.8	4.3	2.0

=== Seat distribution ===
The following is the number of constituency seats for each party with each asterix (*) indicating one of the seats won was a levelling seat.

Constituency	A	B	C	D	F	I	O	V	Ø	Å	Total
Copenhagen	3	3	1		3*	1*	1*	3	4*	1	20
Greater Copenhagen	4	2*	1		1		1	3*	1	1*	14
North Zealand	3	2*	2*	1*	1		1	3	1*		14
Bornholm	1							1			2
Zealand	8*	2*	2*	1*	3*		3*	7*	2*	1*	29
Funen	5*	1	1		1		2*	4*	1		15
South Jutland	6	1	1	1*	1	1*	3	6	1*		21
East Jutland	7*	3*	1	1*	2	1*	2*	6*	1	1*	25
West Jutland	4	1	2*		1	1*	1	5	1*		16
North Jutland	7*	1	1		1		2*	5	1*	1*	19
Total	48	16	12	4	14	4	16	43	13	5	175

== Government formation ==
On election night, Prime Minister Lars Løkke Rasmussen announced that his government would resign the following day. Following consultations with the political parties known as a "Queen's round" (Danish: Dronningerunde), Queen Margrethe II tasked Mette Frederiksen with forming a new government. At the Queen's round, the Social Liberals, the Socialist People's Party and the Red–Green Alliance supported the Social Democratic leader. Government negotiations started on 7 June.

On 19 June, the Social Democrats, the Socialist People's Party and the Red–Green Alliance announced an agreement on global warming, committing to reduce Denmark's emission of CO_{2} by 70% in 2030. The Social Liberals decided to stay away from the meeting, as they were dissatisfied that parts were agreed before the negotiations was complete.

On 25 June, the four parties announced that they had reached an agreement, allowing Frederiksen to become prime minister as leader of a single-party Social Democratic government. Completed 20 days after the general election, the negotiations were the longest since 1988. Frederiksen decided not to formulate a government basis white paper, as is otherwise tradition, saying that it was sufficient with the 18-page "political understanding" she had agreed with her parliamentary support. On 27 June, the new cabinet was announced and took office the same day. The average age of ministers were 41.8 years, and Frederiksen herself became the youngest person to hold the office of prime minister.

== See also ==
- List of members of the Folketing, 2019–2022
