= Lone Dybkjær =

Danish politician (1940–2020)

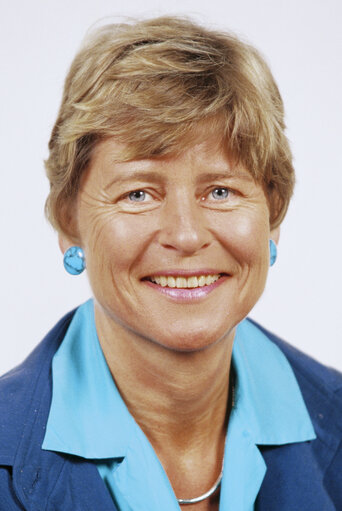
- Lone Dybkjær

Member of the Folketing
- Constituency: Vestre Storkreds
- In office 1971–1977
- In office 1979–1994
- In office 2005–2011

Member of the European Parliament
- In office 1994–2004

Spouse of the Prime Minister
- In office 1995 – 27 November 2001
- Prime Minister: Poul Nyrup Rasmussen
- Preceded by: Lisbeth Schlüter
- Succeeded by: Anne-Mette Rasmussen

Minister for the Environment of Denmark
- In office 3 June 1988 – 18 December 1990
- Prime Minister: Poul Schlüter
- Preceded by: Christian Christensen
- Succeeded by: Per Stig Møller

Personal details
- Born: 23 May 1940 Copenhagen, Denmark
- Died: 20 July 2020 (aged 80) Copenhagen, Denmark
- Party: Danish Social Liberal Party
- Spouse: Poul Nyrup Rasmussen (m. 1994)
- Education: Technical University of Denmark

Lone Dybkjær (23 May 1940 – 20 July 2020) was a Danish politician. She served three non-consecutive terms as a member of the Folketing.

Between 1988 and 1990, she was Minister for the Environment of Denmark during the second Poul Schlüter cabinet. Between 1994 and 2004, she was a member of the European Parliament.

== Political career ==
She was a member of the Danish Social Liberal Party. She was a member of the European Parliament for the party from 1994 to 2004 and also a member of the Danish Parliament (Folketinget), where she served as minister of Environment during the Cabinet of Poul Schlüter.

She was a member of the eminent international Council of Patrons of the Asian University for Women (AUW) in Chittagong, Bangladesh.

== Personal life ==
She graduated from Rungsted Statsskole in 1958 and took a Master of Engineering in chemistry at the Technical University of Denmark in 1964.

In 1994, she married then-Prime Minister Poul Nyrup Rasmussen.

Dybkjær died on 20 July 2020 in Copenhagen from breast cancer, aged 80.

Political offices
Preceded by Christian Christensen	Minister for the Environment of Denmark; 3 June 1988 – 18 December 1990	Succeeded by Per Stig Møller
