= Pia Christmas-Møller =

Danish politician (born 1961)

Pia Christmas-Møller (born 21 January 1961) is a Danish politician, a member of parliament from 1987 until 2011. She represented the Conservative People's Party from 1987 until 2007 and led her party between 1998 and 1999. From 2007 until 2011 she sat as an independent.

Christmas-Møller has served as a member of the Parliamentary Assembly of the Council of Europe since 2002, and as a member of the Danish delegation to the Nordic Council from January 2000 to November 2001, and then again from October 2008 to date. She is also a member of the Parliamentary Assembly of the Organization for Security and Co-operation in Europe (OSCE), of which she was elected a vice-president in 2005 and re-elected in July 2008. In the OSCE Christmas-Møller has been active in election monitoring missions, in which she has served as a Head of Delegation.

On 5 December 2007 she announced that she would leave the Conservatives and sit in the Folketing as an independent.

In 2008, she took part in an OSCE mission to observe the conduct of the United States general election of 2008, heading its delegation in Ohio. The judgment of the mission was that "The U.S. elections clearly reflected the will of the people and demonstrated convincingly the country's commitment to democratic elections".

On climate change, she wrote in 2009 -

The new thing is that we human beings with our technologies now add so much to the fine balances of nature and that we do it in a way and at a pace that can be dangerous for our own lives. We can choose to improve the climate conditions for our children and coming generations. Or we can choose the laissez faire course where we hand down all risks to those who come after us.

Party political offices
Preceded by Per Stig Møller	Leader of the Conservative People's Party; 1998–1999	Succeeded by Bendt Bendtsen
