= Samsø Common List =

Samsø Common List Fælleslisten Samsø
- Leader: Collective leadership
- Headquarters: Samsø
- Ideology: Regionalism
- Colours: Orange
- Municipal councils: 1 / 2,444

Website
- www.faelleslistensamso.dk

The Samsø Common List (Danish: Fælleslisten Samsø), formerly The Samsø List (Danish: Samsø-Listen), is a local political party set in Samsø Municipality on the island of Samsø. Inge-Dorthe Larsen is currently representing the party in the municipal council of Samsø Municipality.

== History ==
In the 2001 Danish local elections, seven candidates ran for The Samsø List. The party won two seats in the municipal council in Samsø Municipality, with 16.66% of the vote.

In 2005, they lost a seat, with a reduced 7.4% of the vote. This resulted in a single seat.

In 2009, the party received 4.7% of the vote. After this election, "The Samsø List" changed the name to "Fælleslisten Samsø".

With four candidates in 2013, Samsø Common List received 10.8% of the vote, resulting in a single seat.

== Election results ==
=== Municipal elections ===
| Year | Votes | Seats | |
| Year | Votes | # | ± |
|---|---|---|---|
| 2001 | 482 | 2 / 4,647 | New |
| 2005 | 191 | 1 / 2,522 | ▼1 |
| 2009 | 119 | 1 / 2,468 | 0 |
| 2013 | 275 | 1 / 2,444 | 0 |
