= Kegnæs =

Peninsula in Denmark

Coordinates: 54°52′N 9°55′E

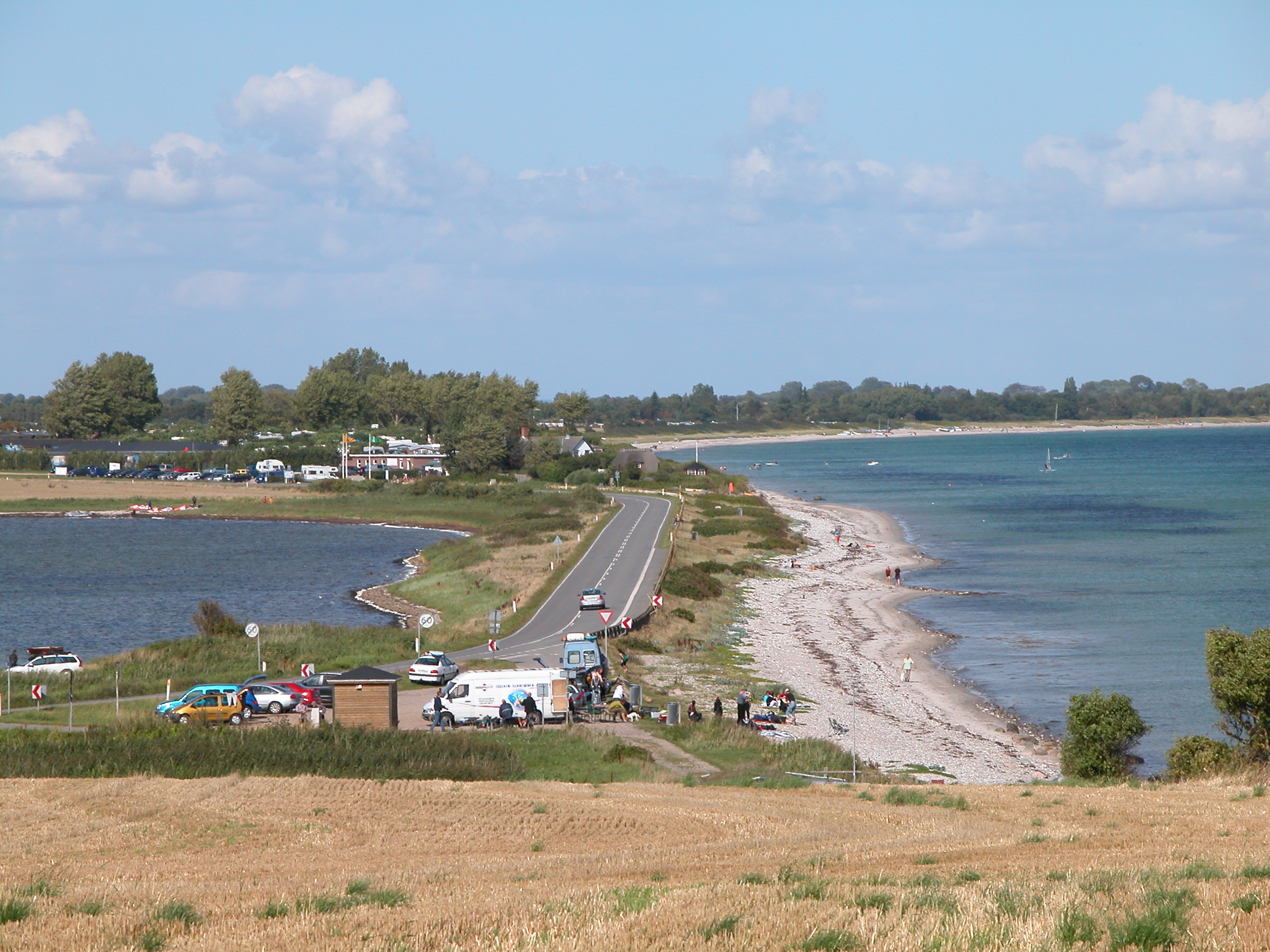
scenery in Kegnæs

Kegnæs (German: Kekenis) is a peninsula on the southern coast of Als in Denmark.

== Location and Size ==
Kegnæs borders the outer Flensburg Fjord to the south and the Höruphaff - a side arm of the Flensburg Fjord - to the north. Only the Spit Drejet, approximately 700 meters long, connects the peninsula to Lysabild.

The peninsula covers just under 17 square kilometers and is home to approximately 600 residents, according to the 1860 census, the population was 733.. The moraine landscape, which rises to 20 meters above sea level, is quite fertile and has a few small woodlands.

Kegnæs is predominantly characterised by large-scale agriculture and small clusters of houses. Only Sønderby, Vesterby and Østerby can be described as villages.

== Places of Interest ==
- Kegnæs Kirke (Church) in Sønderby, commissioned by Duke John the Younger in 1615.

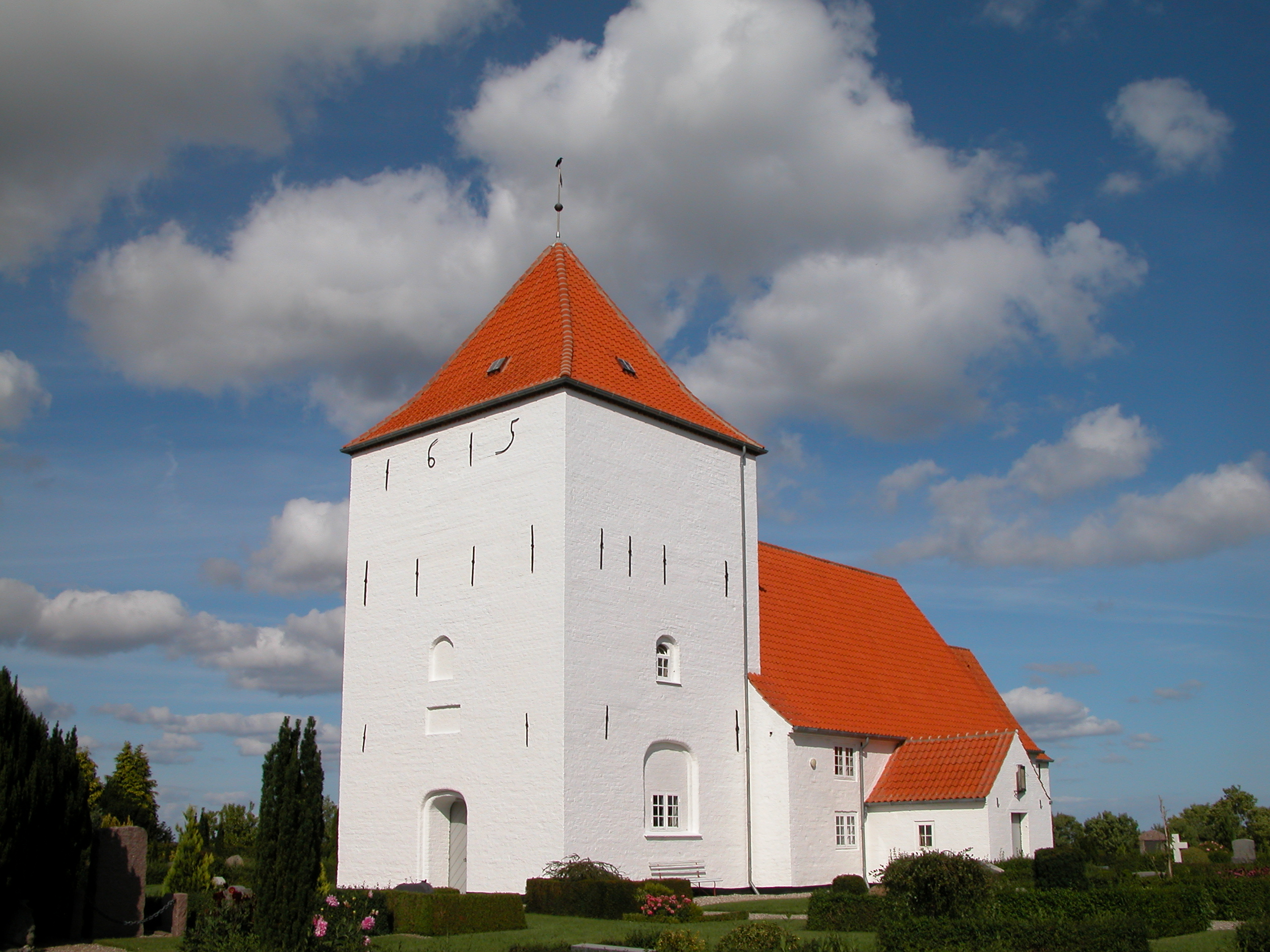
Sankt Johannes Kirke

- Kegnæs Fyr, 18 metres high, built in 1896. The Lighthouse is open from May to September, and visitors can also climb to the top. It also houses a meteorological station and a Danish Navy observation post.

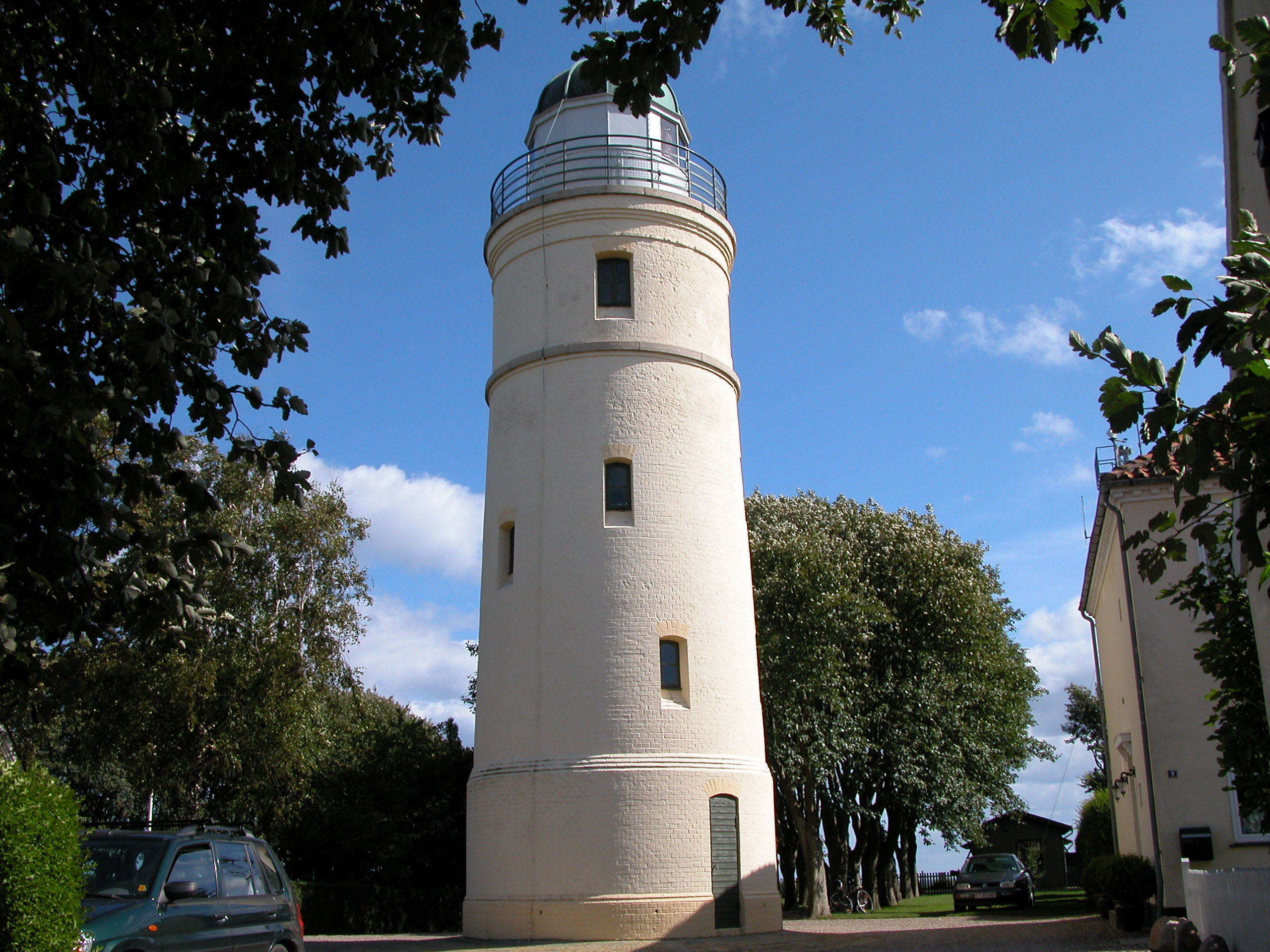
Kegnæs Fyr
