= 2024 European Parliament election in Denmark =

- 9 June 2024
- All 15 Danish seats in the European Parliament
- Turnout: 58.25%
Party	Lead candidate	Vote %	Seats	+/–
Green Left	Kira Peter-Hansen	17.42	3	+1
Social Democrats	Christel Schaldemose	15.57	3	0
Venstre	Morten Løkkegaard	14.72	2	−2
Conservatives	Niels Flemming Hansen	8.84	1	0
Denmark Democrats	Kristoffer Hjort Storm	7.39	1	New
Social Liberals	Sigrid Friis Frederiksen	7.08	1	−1
Red–Green Alliance	Per Clausen	7.04	1	0
Liberal Alliance	Henrik Dahl	6.95	1	+1
DPP	Anders Vistisen	6.37	1	0
Moderates	Stine Bosse	5.95	1	New
This lists parties that won seats. See the complete results below.

The 2024 European Parliament election in Denmark was held on 9 June 2024. The elections were held as part of the wider 2024 European Parliament election, but did not take place in the Faroe Islands and Greenland, which are not part of the European Union.^{da}

== Background ==
In February 2023, the European Parliament's Committee on Constitutional Affairs of the European Parliament (AFCO) released a draft report by Lóránt Vincze and Sandro Gozi on the composition of the European Parliament in order to respect the principle of degressive proportionality (enshrined in the TEU). It was approved by both the AFCO on 12 June 2023, as well as EP plenary on 15 June. The final report was adopted by the European Council on 22 September 2023. With its implementation, Denmark was allocated an additional seat for the European Parliament elections, changing the number from 14 to 15.

On 31 March 2023, Christel Schaldemose was nominated as the main candidate of the Social Democrats. On 15 April 2023, Henrik Dahl announced his candidacy for Liberal Alliance. On 22 April 2023, Morten Løkkegaard was nominated as the main candidate for Venstre.

On 26 May 2023, an electoral alliance was announced between the Social Democrats, Green Left, and The Alternative.

On 16 October 2023, an electoral alliance was announced between the Conservatives and Liberal Alliance

On 7 January 2024, Martin Lidegaard revealed, possibly by mistake, that the Social Liberals wished to join an electoral alliance with Venstre. On 16 January 2024, sources of Altinget said that the two parties and the Moderates would join an electoral alliance. It was officially announced on 26 January 2024.

On 10 January 2024, Pernille Vermund announced that New Right and its parliamentary group would be dissolved, which caused the party to lose ballot access. On 8 March 2024, it gave up on contesting the election.

== Electoral system ==
15 members of the European Parliament will be elected in Denmark through a single constituency, using the D'Hondt method. Parties can choose to either use open list or mostly closed list. Unlike in parliamentary elections, but similarly to local elections, electoral alliances are allowed.

To be an eligible voter one must be at least 18 years old and meet one of the following requirements:

- Danish citizenship and permanent residence in Denmark or another EU member state;

or

- citizenship in another EU member state and resident in Denmark.

To contest the election, a party must either have earned representation at the previous parliamentary election and still be represented in the Folketing 9 weeks before the election date (7 April 2024), or earned representation at the previous European Parliament election in Denmark and still be represented in the European Parliament 9 weeks before the election date. If none of these criteria are met, a party must collect voter signatures from a number of voters equal to at least 2% of the valid votes at the last parliamentary election (70,680). The signatures must be submitted at latest 11 weeks before the election date (24 March 2024).

The election used the 92 Folketing nomination districts for administrative and statistical purposes, but they had no impact on the distribution of seats as Denmark forms a single nationwide constituency for European Parliament elections.

== Outgoing delegation ==
The table shows the detailed composition of the Danish seats at the European Parliament as of April 2024.

EP Group	Seats	Party	Seats	MEPs
Renew Europe	6 / 14	Venstre	3	Asger Christensen; Morten Løkkegaard; Erik Poulsen
Renew Europe	6 / 14	Social Liberals	1	Morten Helveg Petersen
Renew Europe	6 / 14	Moderates	1	Bergur Løkke Rasmussen
Renew Europe	6 / 14	Independents	1	Karen Melchior
Progressive Alliance of Socialists and Democrats	3 / 14	Social Democrats	3	Niels Fuglsang; Christel Schaldemose; Marianne Vind
Greens–European Free Alliance	2 / 14	Green Left	2	Margrete Auken; Kira Marie Peter-Hansen
European People's Party	1 / 14	Conservatives	1	Pernille Weiss
Identity and Democracy	1 / 14	Danish People's Party	1	Anders Vistisen
The Left in the European Parliament – GUE/NGL	1 / 14	Red–Green Alliance	1	Nikolaj Villumsen
Total			14	
Source: European Parliament

=== MEPs not standing for re-election ===
Departing MEP	Party	EP Group	First elected	Terms	Date announced
Nikolaj Villumsen	Red–Green	The Left	2019	1	N/A (Note: Villumsen is ineligible to stand as a candidate for the party, due to the party's rotation principle.)
Erik Poulsen	Venstre	RE	2019 (Note: Poulsen entered the European Parliament as a substitute following the 2022 Danish general election.)	1	16 November 2022
Karen Melchior	Independent	RE	2019	1	10 August 2022
Margrete Auken	Green Left	Greens/EFA	2004	4	1 April 2023
Morten Helveg Petersen	Social Liberals	RE	2014	2	3 June 2023
Pernille Weiss	Conservatives	EPP	2019	1	23 September 2023

== Parties running ==
Because no party managed to obtain the required signatures before 24 March 2024, only the 11 parties represented in the Folketing on 7 April 2024 were eligible to contest the election. Of the 11 parties contesting the election, 8 are currently represented in the European Parliament and are members of a group. Liberal Alliance, the Denmark Democrats, and the Alternative are not represented in the European Parliament, and are thus not part of any group, but intend to join EPP, ECR, and Greens/EFA respectively in the event they obtain representation in the European Parliament.

Danish parties contesting the 2024 European Parliament election
Party		Lead candidate	Last election		Current seats	EP group
Party		Lead candidate	%	Seats	Current seats	EP group
V	Venstre	Morten Løkkegaard	23.50%	4	3	Renew
A	Social Democrats	Christel Schaldemose	21.48%	3	3	S&D
F	Green Left	Kira Peter-Hansen	13.23%	2	2	Greens/EFA
O	Danish People's Party	Anders Vistisen	10.76%	1	1	ID
B	Social Liberals	Sigrid Friis Frederiksen	10.07%	2	1	Renew
C	Conservatives	Niels Flemming Hansen	6.18%	1	1	EPP
Ø	Red-Green Alliance	Per Clausen	5.51%	1	1	The Left
Å	The Alternative	Jan Kristoffersen	3.37%	0	0	Greens/EFA
I	Liberal Alliance	Henrik Dahl	2.20%	0	0	EPP
M	Moderates	Stine Bosse	Did not contest		1	Renew
Æ	Denmark Democrats	Kristoffer Hjort Storm	Did not contest		0	ECR

=== Electoral alliances ===
For European Parliament elections in Denmark, apparentments (or electoral alliances) are allowed. If parties agree to enter an electoral alliance, they will count their votes as one and be allocated seats as though it was one party, using the D'Hondt method. When an electoral alliance has been allocated the number of seats it is entitled to, the seats will similarly be divided between them using the D'Hondt method. The following electoral alliances were submitted for the election:

Party		Political position
A	Social Democrats	Centre-left
F	Green Left	Centre-left to Left-wing
Å	The Alternative	Centre-left to Left-wing

Party		Political position
B	Social Liberals	Centre to Centre-left
M	Moderates	Centre to Centre-right
V	Venstre	Centre-right

Party		Political position
C	Conservatives	Centre-right
I	Liberal Alliance	Centre-right to Right-wing

== Candidates ==
The following candidates are contesting the election for each party. The candidates are listed in the order listed on the ballot throughout the country.

A. Social Democrats	B: Social Liberals	C. Conservatives	F. Green Left	I. Liberal Alliance	M. Moderates	O. Danish People's Party	V. Venstre	Æ. Denmark Democrats	Ø. Red–Green Alliance	Å. The Alternative
Candidates: Christel Schaldemose; Niels Fuglsang; Marianne Vind; Magnus Barsøe; Asser Mortensen; Mathias Niebuhr; Niels Christian Dahl; Andi Helbo Sejersen; Tayo Lill Andreasen; Maria Radoor	Candidates: Sigrid Friis; Anne Sophie Callesen; Philip Tarning-Andersen; Anne-Sofie Sadolin Henningsen; Charlotte Amdi Burgess; Kathrine Olldag; Frederik Aagaard Sørensen; Hediye Temiz; Jens Frost; João Møller; Jan Werner Mathiasen; Kim Pagels; Finn Hartvig Nielsen; Sissel van Run-Kvist; Martin Schepelern; Michael Flarup; Asmus Knigge Vilster; Nikolai Tange; Lars Fogh Mortensen; Lartey Lawson	Candidates: Niels Flemming Hansen; Marcus Knuth; Birgitte Bergman; Maria Pryds; Steen Holm Iversen; Tina-Mia Eriksen; Søren Friis Trebbien; Flemming Agerskov; Jacob Rosenberg; Natasja Bruun Knudsen; Egil Hulgaard; Helle Laursen Petersen; Manuel Vigilius; Barbara Engelstoft; Nicklas Verne; Vladimir Stanic; Elisabeth Ildal; Martin Vendel Nielsen; John Hoppe; Jacob Stryhn	Candidates: Kira Marie Peter-Hansen; Rasmus Nordqvist; Villy Søvndal; Rikke Lauritsen; Magnus Flensborg; Kristine Amalie Rostgård; Melina Andersen; Taner Genc; Andreas Grosbøll; Michael Egelund Andersen; Joan Kragh; Thue Grum-Schwensen; Mads Hvid; John Brandt; Anders Bøge; Pia Lieberknecht; Emil Njor; Elias Julius Binggeli; Kim Elmose; Allan Søgaard-Andersen	Candidates: Henrik Dahl; Mads Strange; Thorbjørn Jacobsen; Carsten Normann; Helle Jensen; Martin Sibast Laugesen; Thomas Vesth; Nikolaj Steffenauer; Danny Malkowski; Lars Høyer Holmqvist; Louise Siv Ebbesen; Chelle Lilly	Candidates: Stine Bosse; Bergur Løkke Rasmussen; Tobias Marney; Laurs Nørlund; Barikan Solecki; Klavs A. Holm; Karin Liltorp; Ivar Nørlund; Frederik Lau Petersen; Abdinoor Adam Hassan; Dea Kehler; Lars Barfoed	Candidates: Anders Vistisen; Majbritt Birkholm; Tobias Weische; Hans Blaaberg; Finn Rudaizky; Sune Nørgaard Jakobsen; Carsten Sørensen; Michael Nedersøe; Rune Bønnelykke; Julie Jacobsen; Søren Hansen; Inger-Marie Tryde; Mette Sode Hansen; Henrik Thinggaard; Birgitte Milling; Søren Lund Hansen; Bonett Trusell; Stine Steffensen	Candidates: Morten Løkkegaard; Asger Christensen; Ulla Tørnæs; Julie Hassing; Marianne Lynghøj; Carsten Kissmeyer; Alexandra Sasha (Note: Alexandra Sasha and Irina Bjørnø both announced the withdrawal of their candidacies after the submission of party lists. However, both formally remained candidates and were on the ballot.); Jonas Pullich; Torsten Laksafoss Holbek; Thorbern Alexander Klingert; Jakob Dyrman; Niels Plum	Candidates: Kristoffer Storm; Vivi Altenburg; Magnus Bigum; Benny Bindslev; Lars Bregnbak; Susanne Damsgaard; Karen Lia Fromm-Christiansen; Annette Benthien Giuranna; Renate Hendriksen; Niklas Fritz Kjærulff; Anton Rosenstrøm Laursen; Bob Richard Nielsen; Dina Person; Erik Poulsen; Morten Vehl Revsbeck; Claus Bisgaard Skovmose; Bent Juul Sørensen; Nikolaj Vang	Candidates: Per Clausen; Frederikke Hellemann; Nana Højlund; Ludvig Goldschmidt; Asta Kofod; Reinout Bosch; Torsten Ringgaard; Stine Ry Andersen; Selma Bolø; Victoria Velásquez; Ibrahim Benli; Christian Schmidt Jacobsen; Runa Friis Hansen; Clara Turms	Candidates: Jan Kristoffersen; Karoline Lindgaard; Petar Socevic; Nilas Bay-Foged; Sofie Groth; Jørn Grønkjær; Valentina Crast; Julius Schubring; Johannes Slyngborg; Yurdal Cicek; Anette Jensen Smith; Mikael Hertig; Irina Bjørnø

== Opinion polling ==
The tables below list opinion polling results in reverse chronological order, showing the most recent first and using the dates when the survey fieldwork was done, as opposed to the date of publication. Where the fieldwork dates are unknown, the date of publication is given instead. The seats the result would produce is shown below the result for each party. The electoral alliances announced for this election are taken into account.

Polling execution			Parties												Alliances		
Polling firm	Fieldwork date	Sample size	V Renew	A S&D	F G/EFA	O ID	B Renew	C EPP	Ø Left	Å G/EFA	I EPP	M Renew	Æ ECR	Others	AFÅ	BMV	CI
2024 EP election			14.7; 2	15.6; 3	17.4; 3	6.4; 1	7.1; 1	8.8; 1	7.0; 1	2.7; 0	7.0; 1	5.9; 1	7.4; 1	—	35.7; 6	27.7; 4	15.8; 2
Epinion (exit poll)	9 June	?	13.9; 2	15.4; 3	18.4; 3	6.5; 1	6.9; 1	7.4; 1	6.6; 1	3.3; 0	7.8; 1	6.2; 1	7.6; 1	—	37.1; 6	27.0; 4	15.2; 2
Verian	29 May–5 Jun 2024	2,301	11.5; 2	18.9; 3	16.6; 3	7.0; 1	5.4; 0	6.8; 1	6.4; 1	2.0; 0	10.5; 2	5.9; 1	8.8; 1	—	37.5; 6	22.8; 3	17.3; 3
Verian	29 May–5 Jun 2024	2,301	11.5; 2	18.9; 3	16.6; 3	7.0; 1	5.4; 0	6.8; 1	6.4; 1	2.0; 0	10.5; 2	5.9; 1	8.8; 1	—	37.5; 6	22.8; 3	17.3; 3
Epinion	28 May–3 Jun 2024	2,085	10.8; 2	17.7; 3	16.6; 3	6.4; 1	4.9; 0	8.3; 1	7.8; 1	4.1; 0	8.5; 2	6.0; 1	8.9; 1	—	38.4; 6	21.7; 3	16.8; 3
Epinion	8–14 May 2024	2,025	12.5; 2	21.4; 4	13.1; 2	7.4; 1	5.4; 1	7.1; 1	6.8; 1	1.7; 0	9.9; 2	4.0; 0	10.4; 1	—	36.2; 6	21.9; 3	17.0; 3
Verian	8–14 May 2024	1,565	13.6; 2	18.6; 3	14.0; 3	9.6; 1	4.7; 1	6.8; 1	6.2; 1	1.2; 0	12.2; 2	3.9; 0	9.1; 1	—	33.8; 6	22.2; 3	19.0; 3
Epinion	23–29 Apr 2024	1,938	11.2; 2	20.1; 4	14.6; 2	6.5; 1	7.0; 1	6.8; 1	6.9; 1	2.3; 0	12.0; 2	4.5; 0	8.1; 1	—	37.0; 6	22.7; 3	18.8; 3
Epinion	6–13 Mar 2024	1,074	12; 2	24; 4	14; 2	7; 1	5; 1	5; 1	7; 1	3; 0	9; 1	7; 1	7; 1	—	41; 6	24; 4	14; 2
Ipsos	23 Feb–5 Mar 2024	1,000	10.5; 2	21.0; 4	12.0; 2	5.0; 0	6.0; 1	6.0; 1	8.0; 1	2.0; 0	13.0; 2	7.0; 1	8.5; 1	—	35.0; 6	23.5; 4	19.0; 3
Epinion	24–31 Jan 2024	1,051	11; 2	22; 4	12; 2	7; 1	6; 1	6; 1	7; 1	1; 0	10; 1	7; 1	9; 1	—	35; 6	24; 4	16; 2
2022 general election			13.3 (3)	27.5 (6)	8.3 (1)	2.6 (0)	3.8 (0)	5.5 (1)	5.1 (0)	3.3 (0)	7.9 (1)	9.3 (2)	8.1 (1)	5.2 (0)	39.1 (7)	26.4 (4)	13.4 (2)
2021 municipal elections			21.2 (4)	28.4 (5)	7.6 (1)	4.1 (0)	5.6 (1)	15.2 (3)	7.3 (1)	0.7 (0)	1.4 (0)	—		8.5 (0)	36.7 (6)	26.8 (5)	16.6 (3)
2019 general election			23.4 (5)	25.9 (6)	7.7 (1)	8.7 (1)	8.6 (0)	6.6 (1)	6.9 (1)	3.0 (0)	2.3 (0)	—		6.9 (0)	36.6 (7)	32.0 (5)	9.0 (1)
2019 EP election			23.5 (4)	21.5; 3	13.2; 2	10.8; 1	10.1; 2	6.2; 1	5.5; 1	3.4; 0	2.2; 0	—		3.7; 0	—		

== Results ==

Party	Votes	%	Seats	+/–
Green Left	426,472	17.42	3	+1
Social Democrats	381,125	15.57	3	0
Venstre	360,212	14.72	2	−2
Conservatives	216,357	8.84	1	0
Denmark Democrats	180,836	7.39	1	New
Social Liberals	173,355	7.08	1	−1
Red–Green Alliance	172,287	7.04	1	0
Liberal Alliance	170,199	6.95	1	+1
Danish People's Party	156,014	6.37	1	0
Moderates	145,698	5.95	1	New
The Alternative	65,228	2.66	0	0
Total	2,447,783	100.00	15	+1
Valid votes	2,447,783	97.70		
Invalid votes	51,315	2.05		
Blank votes	6,284	0.25		
Total votes	2,505,382	100.00		
Registered voters/turnout	4,301,255	58.25		
Source: Danmarks Statistik

=== Seat apportionment ===
The distribution of seats at the election was the same as what it would have been if electoral alliances were not possible.

Main apportionment
Letter	Electoral alliance/party outside of electoral alliance	Votes	Quotients	Seats
AFÅ	Social Democrats/Socialist People's Party/The Alternative	872,825	6.23	6
BMV	Danish Social Liberal Party/Moderates/Venstre	679,265	4.85	4
CI	Conservative People's Party/Liberal Alliance	386,556	2.76	2
O	Danish People's Party	156,014	1.11	1
Æ	Denmark Democrats	180,836	1.29	1
Ø	Red–Green Alliance	254,004	1.23	1
Divisor: 140,000

Alliance 1
Letter	Party	Votes	Quotients	Seats
A	Social Democrats	381,125	3.18	3
F	Socialist People's Party	426,472	3.55	3
Å	The Alternative	65,228	0.54	0
Divisor: 120,000

Alliance 2
Letter	Party	Votes	Quotients	Seats
B	Social Liberals	173,355	1.33	1
M	Moderates	145,698	1.12	1
V	Venstre	360,212	2.77	2
Divisor: 130,000

Alliance 3
Letter	Party	Votes	Quotients	Seats
C	Conservative People's Party	216,357	1.55	1
I	Liberal Alliance	170,199	1.22	1
Divisor: 140,000
