= 2019 European Parliament election in Denmark =

← 2014	26 May 2019	2024 →
- All 14 Danish seats in the European Parliament (Note: Until Brexit took effect on 31 January 2020, there were 13 seats)
- Turnout: 66.08% (▲9.76pp)
Party	Leader	Vote %	Seats	+/–
Venstre	Morten Løkkegaard	23.50	4	+2
Social Democrats	Jeppe Kofod	21.48	3	0
SF	Margrete Auken	13.23	2	+1
Social Liberals	Morten Helveg Petersen	10.07	2	+1
DPP	Peter Kofod	10.76	1	−3
Conservatives	Pernille Weiss	6.18	1	0
Red–Green	Nikolaj Villumsen	5.51	1	New
This lists parties that won seats. See the complete results below.
Largest party within each Folketing nomination district and constituency.

The 2019 European Parliament election in Denmark was held on 26 May 2019, and elected the Danish members to the European Parliament. The elections are part of the EU-wide elections for the parliament. Denmark had 13 seats in parliament, which increased by one additional seat following Brexit.

Venstre won the election, becoming the biggest party and gaining two seats. The election was a disaster for the Danish People's Party, who lost three of their four seats. Both the Socialist People's Party and the Social Liberals won doubles their seats from one to two. The People's Movement against the EU lost the representation in the parliament they have had since 1979.

The election were held 10 days before general elections in Denmark.

== Background ==
In the 2014 European Parliament election, the Danish People's Party (DPP) became the largest party, gaining 4 seats overall, and the lead candidate, Morten Messerschmidt, received 465.758 individual votes, a new record.

In October 2015, Rikke Karlson, another member of the DPP-group in the parliament, left the party due to lack of internal transparency into documents related to MELD and the associated foundation FELD. The following media attention revealed that MELD and DPP had misused EU funding, and Messerschmidt were forced to resign as leader of the parliamentary group. He was replaced by Anders Visitisen.

In December 2015, Jens Rohde, elected MEP as a member of Venstre, left the party due to discontent with the parties increasingly tougher policy on immigration, passed in cooperation with DPP. Rohde joined the Social Liberals instead. In February 2016, Ulla Tørnæs from Venstre left the parliament to become Minister for Science, Technology, Information and Higher Education. Morten Løkkegaard became the new Venstre MEP.

== Parties contesting ==
All parties represented in the Folketing participate in the election, in addition to the People's Movement against the EU. In previous elections, the Red-Green Alliance have declined to contest, but instead supported the People's Movement against the EU. This is the first European Parliament election that The Alternative participate in.

Danish parties contesting the 2019 European Parliament election
Party		Lead candidate	Last election		EP group (Note: As of the 8th European Parliament (2014–2019))	Coalition
O	Danish People's Party	Peter Kofod	26.61%	4 seats	ECR	-
A	Social Democrats	Jeppe Kofod	19.12%	3 seats	S&D	A, F
V	Venstre	Morten Løkkegaard	16.68%	2 seats	ALDE	C, I, V
F	Socialist People's Party	Margrete Auken	10.95%	1 seat	Greens/EFA	A, F
C	Conservative	Pernille Weiss	9.15%	1 seat	EPP	C, I, V
N	People's Movement against the EU	Rina Ronja Kari	8.07%	1 seat	GUE/NGL	N, Ø
B	Social Liberals	Morten Helveg Petersen	6.54%	1 seat	ALDE	B, Å
I	Liberal Alliance	Mette Bock	2.88%	-		C, I, V
Ø	Red-Green Alliance	Nikolaj Villumsen	did not contest			N, Ø
Å	The Alternative	Rasmus Nordqvist	did not contest			B, Å

The Alternative is contesting the election as a member of Democracy in Europe Movement 2025, a pan-European political movement who have a common political manifest. In April 2019, DPP was among the founding members of the European Alliance of People and Nations, a new coalition who aim to create a broader nationalist group after the election. If elected, the Liberal Alliance wishes to join ALDE, and the Red-Green Alliance wishes to join GUE/NGL.

== Results ==
Venstre became the biggest party in the election, taking 23.5% of the vote and four seats, of which one will be assigned to Denmark following Brexit. They were closely followed by the Social Democrats with 21.5% and three seats. The election was a "meltdown" for the Danish People's Party, who saw their support drop from 26.6% to 10.8%, and who lost three of the four seats they won in the last election.

Both the Socialist People's Party and the Social Liberals had a good election, and both parties saw their seats double from one to two. The latter due to their electoral alliance with The Alternative, who did not win a seat.

The Conservative People's Party managed to defend their single seat despite a smaller vote share compared to last election. The Conservative People's Party is the only Danish party that is a member of the EPP, the largest group in the European Parliament. Prior to the election, people warned that it might damage Danish interests if there were no longer any Danish parties represented in the EPP.

The People's Movement Against the EU lost their single seat, and for the first time since 1979, they are not represented in the parliament. The loss was widely regarded as caused by the Red-Green Alliance, who traditionally have supported the People's Movement, but decided to contest the election for the first time. The Red-Green Alliance won a single seat. Incumbent MEP Rina Ronja Kari reacted by saying that the movement would live on, and that "the EU-opposition is not dead".

Party	Votes	%	Seats	+/–
Venstre	648,203	23.50	4	+2
Social Democrats	592,645	21.48	3	0
Socialist People's Party	364,895	13.23	2	+1
Danish People's Party	296,978	10.76	1	–3
Danish Social Liberal Party	277,929	10.07	2	+1
Conservative People's Party	170,544	6.18	1	0
Red-Green Alliance	151,903	5.51	1	New
People's Movement against the EU	102,101	3.70	0	–1
The Alternative	92,964	3.37	0	New
Liberal Alliance	60,693	2.20	0	0
Total	2,758,855	100.00	14	+1
Valid votes	2,758,855	98.53		
Invalid/blank votes	41,174	1.47		
Total votes	2,800,029	100.00		
Registered voters/turnout	4,237,550	66.08		
Source: Danmarks Statistik

Voter turnout were 66%, the highest ever in a Danish European Parliament election. This was unexpected, as the campaign was largely overshadowed by the general election 10 days later. A study by election scientist Kasper Møller Hansen showed that among first-time voters (18–23 years old), the turnout increased from 41,19 % in 2014 to 59,70 % in 2019. Møller Hansen ascribed the increase to a general focus on climate change and Brexit, as well educational elections held at schools since 2015.

=== Seat apportionment ===
Main apportionment
Letter	Electoral alliance/party outside of electoral alliance	Votes	Quotients		Seats	
Letter	Electoral alliance/party outside of electoral alliance	Votes	13 seats	14 seats	13 seats	14 seats
AF	Social Democrats/Socialist People's Party	957,540	5.32	5.63	5	5
BÅ	Danish Social Liberal Party/The Alternative	370,893	2.06	2.18	2	2
CIV	Conservative People's Party/Liberal Alliance/Venstre	879,440	4.89	5.17	4	5
NØ	People's Movement against the EU/Red–Green Alliance	254,004	1.41	1.49	1	1
O	Danish People's Party	296,978	1.65	1.75	1	1
Divisor: 180,000 (13 seats)/170,000 (14 seats)

Alliance 1
Letter	Party	Votes	Quotients	Seats
A	Social Democrats	592,645	3.49	3
F	Socialist People's Party	364,895	2.15	2
Divisor: 170,000

Alliance 2
Letter	Party	Votes	Quotients	Seats
B	Danish Social Liberal Party	277,929	2.78	2
Å	The Alternative	92,964	0.93	0
Divisor: 100,000

Alliance 3
Letter	Party	Votes	Quotients		Seats	
Letter	Party	Votes	4 seats	5 seats	4 seats	5 seats
C	Conservative People's Party	170,544	1.003	1.14	1	1
I	Liberal Alliance	60,693	0.36	0.40	0	0
V	Venstre	648,203	3.81	4.32	3	4
Divisor: 170,000 (4 seats)/150,000 (5 seats)

Alliance 4
Letter	Party	Votes	Quotients	Seats
N	People's Movement against the EU	102,101	0.79	0
Ø	Red–Green Alliance	151,903	1.17	1
Divisor: 130,000

=== Elected members ===
The following candidates were elected to the European Parliament:

Venstre

- Morten Løkkegaard (207,558 personal votes)
- Søren Gade (201,696 personal votes)
- Asger Christensen (31,347 personal votes)
- Following Brexit: Linea Søgaard-Lidell (24,153 personal votes)

Social Democrats

- Jeppe Kofod (188,757 personal votes)
- Christel Schaldemose (65,179 personal votes)
- Niels Fuglsang (29,444 personal votes)

Socialist People's Party

- Margrete Auken (199,522 personal votes)
- Kira Marie Peter-Hansen (15,765 personal votes) (Note: The second seat of the Socialist People's Party was won by MP Karsten Hønge with 19,689 personal votes, but he choose to not take his seat, as he was also seeking reelection to the Folketing at the 5 June election.)

Social Liberals

- Morten Helveg Petersen (97,667 personal votes)
- Karen Melchior (17,292 personal votes)

Danish People's Party

- Peter Kofod (119,408 personal votes)

Conservative

- Pernille Weiss (80,140 personal votes)

Red-Green Alliance

- Nikolaj Villumsen (50,567 personal votes)

On 27 June Jeppe Kofod was appointed Minister of Foreign Affairs in the Social Democratic government formed after the general elections held on 5 June, and thus did not take his seat. The appointment was a surprise as he had just been elected, but media speculated it was due to Henrik Sass Larsen not being available as a minister. Marianne Vind is to take his seat.
