= Sigrid Friis Frederiksen =

Danish politician (born 1994)

Sigrid Friis Frederiksen MEP
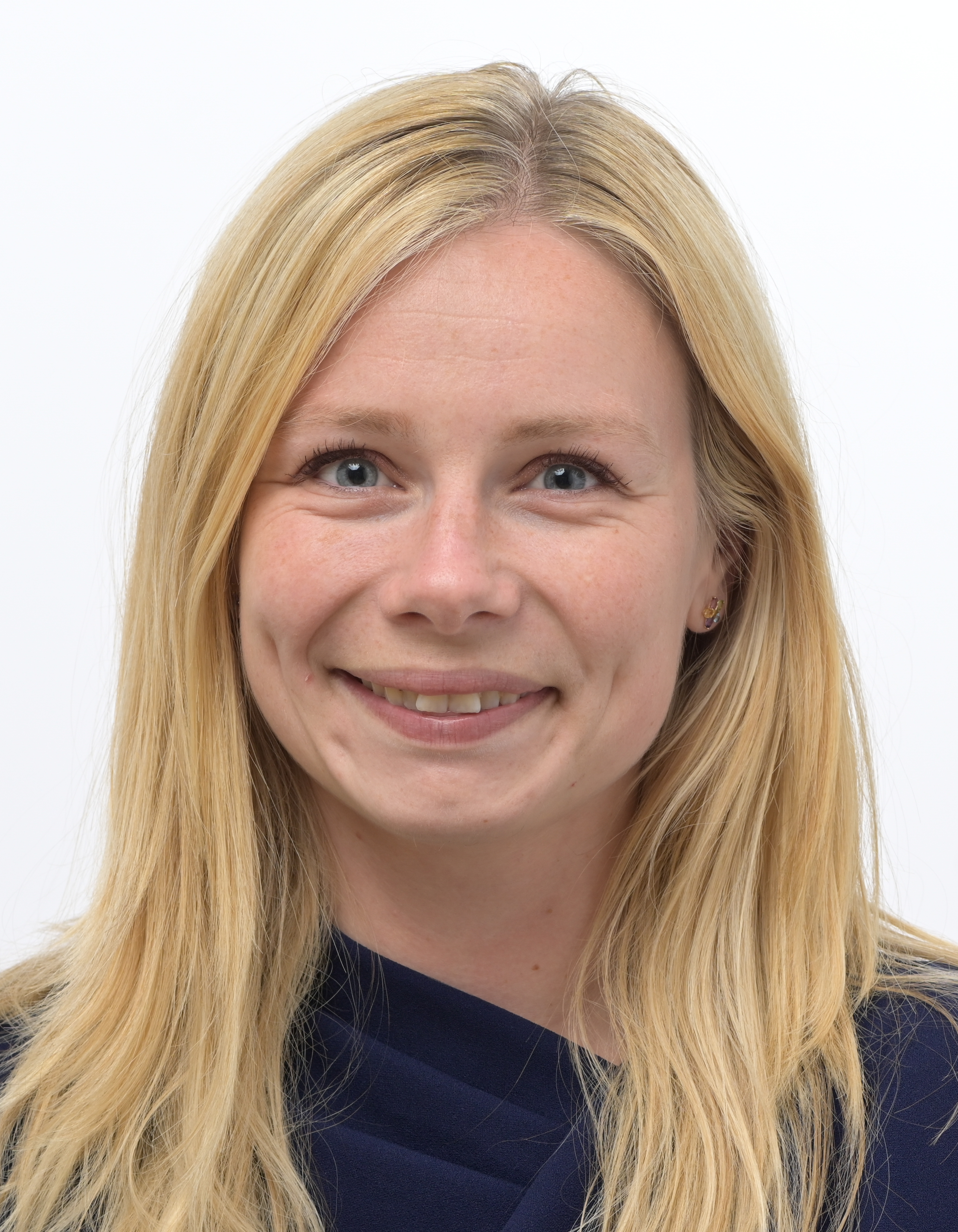
- Official portrait, 2024

Member of the European Parliament for Denmark
- Incumbent
- Assumed office 16 July 2024
- President: Roberta Metsola
- Parliamentary group: Renew

Personal details
- Born: Sigrid Friis Proschowsky; October 20, 1994 (age 31) Hillerød, Denmark
- Party: Danish Social Liberal Party
- Education: University of Copenhagen

Sigrid Friis Frederiksen (née Proschowsky; born 20 October 1994) is a Danish politician who is the former chairman of Radikal Ungdom. She is also a blogger for Altinget.dk and BT. She also sits on both the executive committee and the main board of the Danish Social Liberal Party. In September 2023, she was chosen to be her party's lead candidate for the 2024 European Parliament election in Denmark.

== Early life and education ==
Sigrid Friis Frederiksen (born Sigrid Friis Proschowsky) was born and raised in Hillerød. She graduated from N. Zahle's School in 2014 and at the same time received Dr. Bach's memorial grant for special commitment to the subject of history. She has studied political science at the University of Copenhagen and in 2018 became a bachelor in the subject after writing an assignment on the democratic participation of young people in connection with the school elections.

== Political career ==
Sigrid Friis became a member of Radikal Ungdom in 2013 and in 2015 was given a seat on the executive committee with responsibility for International Cooperation. She participated in the election campaign for the Democrat candidate Hillary Clinton in the 2016 United States presidential election. Internationally, she has engaged in cooperation across parties through the Nordiska Centerungdommens Forbund (NCF) in the Nordic region, the European Liberal Youth (LYMEC) on a European level and the International Federation of Liberal Youth (IFLRY) on a global level.

In Denmark, she won 2nd place at the "DM in Debate 2017". She has introduced the concept of EU-fori and was dubbed the "Debat Fairy" by Søs Marie Seerup. Additionally she is a commentator in newspapers and has, among other things, criticized the Danish royal family and the Burka ban.

She took over the position as national chairman of the youth party in August 2017 replacing Victor Boysen. As national chairman, she brought Radikal Ungdom into the work with the United Nations Sustainable Development Goals. In September 2018, she was appointed as dialogue ambassador for the Danish Youth Joint Council. In this role, worked actively with young people to promote understanding across cultures under the mission statement, "Strengthen and engage young people".

She has won the award "Woman of Europe" from the European Movement International and the European Women's Lobby. She won the prize for her work in engaging young people in Europe in Denmark and for playing with the rhetoric about the EU.

Since 2017, she has been followed by the video documentarian, Lise Birk Pedersen, for a generational portrait of young politicians.

=== Member of the European Parliament ===
Sigrid Friis Frederiksen was nominated by her party as a new MEP candidate in 2022. Karen Melchior had previously been nominated in this constituency. In 2023, Morten Helveg Petersen, who has represented the party in the European Parliament since 2014, announced that he did not intend to stand again in the upcoming election.

At the national meeting of the Danish Social Liberal Party from 16 to 17 September 2023, the delegated party members voted for Frederiksen to be the new lead candidate. She was chosen ahead of several prominent names such as Rasmus Helveg and Anne Sophie Callesen. After being chosen she said afterwards: "I think they have chosen me because I emphasize that we are the party for the next generation. That the climate battle must be fought by new forces, and I can be at the forefront of lifting that task."

== Political views ==
=== #MeToo ===
In 2020, Frederiksen alongside, Freja Fokdal, Maria Gudme and Camilla Søe took the initiative to #enblandtos. The movement #enblandtos refers to 322 women across political parties who signed a debate paper on sexism in Danish politics. The article, as well as 79 anonymous testimonies about boundary-crossing behaviour, was published in Politiken on 25 September 2020. The four signatories described it as saying that the appeal should establish that sexism exists in the political parties and that it is a common problem that requires action. The hashtag #enblandtos is seen as part of the 2nd wave of the MeToo movement in Denmark, which was started by a speech by Sofie Linde at the Zulu Comedy Gala.
