= Denmark (European Parliament constituency) =

Constituency of the European Parliament

- European Parliament constituency
- Location among the current constituencies
- Member state: Denmark
- Created: 1979
- MEPs: 16 (Note: Including 1 seat from Greenland until the secession in 1985) (1979–2004); 14 (2004–2009); 13 (2009–2020); 14 (2020–2024); 15 (June 2024–present)

Denmark is a European Parliament constituency for the elections to the European Parliament covering the Member state of the European Union Denmark, but not other parts of the Danish Realm such as the Faroe Islands or Greenland, which are not a part of the EU. It is currently represented by fifteen Members of the European Parliament. Denmark uses the D'Hondt method of proportional representation. Electoral alliances between two or more parties are allowed.

== Members of the European Parliament ==
Election	MEP (party)	MEP (party)	MEP (party)	MEP (party)	MEP (party)	MEP (party)	MEP (party)	MEP (party)	MEP (party)	MEP (party)	MEP (party)	MEP (party)	MEP (party)	MEP (party)	MEP (party)	MEP (party)
1979	Erhard Jakobsen (CD)	Kent Kirk (DKF)	Poul Møller (DKF)	Kai Nyborg (DKF)	Finn Lynge (Siumut)	Niels Haagerup (Venstre)	Jørgen Nielsen (Venstre)	Tove Nielsen (Venstre)	Eva Gredal (S)	Mette Groes (S)	Kjeld Olesen (S)	Bodil Boserup (SF)	Jørgen Bøgh (People's Movement)	Else Hammerich (People's Movement)	Jens-Peter Bonde (People's Movement /June Movement)	Sven Skovmand (People's Movement)
1979	Erhard Jakobsen (CD)	Kent Kirk (DKF)	Poul Møller (DKF)	Kai Nyborg (DKF)	Finn Lynge (Siumut)	Niels Haagerup (Venstre)	Jørgen Nielsen (Venstre)	Tove Nielsen (Venstre)	Eva Gredal (S)	Mette Groes (S)	Ove Fich (S)	Bodil Boserup (SF)	Jørgen Bøgh (People's Movement)	Else Hammerich (People's Movement)	Jens-Peter Bonde (People's Movement /June Movement)	Sven Skovmand (People's Movement)
1980	Erhard Jakobsen (CD)	Kent Kirk (DKF)	Poul Møller (DKF)	Kai Nyborg (DKF)	Finn Lynge (Siumut)	Niels Haagerup (Venstre)	Jørgen Nielsen (Venstre)	Tove Nielsen (Venstre)	Eva Gredal (S)	Eggert Petersen (S)	Ove Fich (S)	Bodil Boserup (SF)	Jørgen Bøgh (People's Movement)	Else Hammerich (People's Movement)	Jens-Peter Bonde (People's Movement /June Movement)	Sven Skovmand (People's Movement)
1984	Erhard Jakobsen (CD)	Marie Jepsen (DKF)	Poul Møller (DKF)	Jeanette Oppenheim (DKF)	Finn Lynge (Siumut)	Claus Toksvig (DKF)	Jørgen Nielsen (Venstre)	Tove Nielsen (Venstre)	Eva Gredal (S)	Ejner Hovgård Christiansen (S/ Ind.)	Ove Fich (S)	Bodil Boserup (SF)	Jørgen Bøgh (People's Movement)	Else Hammerich (People's Movement)	Jens-Peter Bonde (People's Movement /June Movement)	Ib Christensen (People's Movement)
1985	Erhard Jakobsen (CD)	Marie Jepsen (DKF)	Poul Møller (DKF)	Jeanette Oppenheim (DKF)	John Iversen (SF)	Claus Toksvig (DKF)	Jørgen Nielsen (Venstre)	Tove Nielsen (Venstre)	Eva Gredal (S)	Ejner Hovgård Christiansen (S/ Ind.)	Ove Fich (S)	Bodil Boserup (SF)	Jørgen Bøgh (People's Movement)	Else Hammerich (People's Movement)	Jens-Peter Bonde (People's Movement /June Movement)	Ib Christensen (People's Movement)
1986	Erhard Jakobsen (CD)	Marie Jepsen (DKF)	Larson Poulsen (DKF)	Jeanette Oppenheim (DKF)	John Iversen (SF)	Claus Toksvig (DKF)	Jørgen Nielsen (Venstre)	Tove Nielsen (Venstre)	Eva Gredal (S)	Ejner Hovgård Christiansen (S/ Ind.)	Ove Fich (S)	Bodil Boserup (SF)	Jørgen Bøgh (People's Movement)	Else Hammerich (People's Movement)	Jens-Peter Bonde (People's Movement /June Movement)	Ib Christensen (People's Movement)
1987	Erhard Jakobsen (CD)	Marie Jepsen (DKF)	Larson Poulsen (DKF)	Jeanette Oppenheim (DKF)	John Iversen (SF)	Claus Toksvig (DKF)	Jørgen Nielsen (Venstre)	Tove Nielsen (Venstre)	Eva Gredal (S)	Ejner Hovgård Christiansen (S/ Ind.)	Ove Fich (S)	Bodil Boserup (SF)	Birgit Bjørnvig (People's Movement /June Movement)	Else Hammerich (People's Movement)	Jens-Peter Bonde (People's Movement /June Movement)	Ib Christensen (People's Movement)
1988	Erhard Jakobsen (CD)	Marie Jepsen (DKF)	Larson Poulsen (DKF)	Jeanette Oppenheim (DKF)	John Iversen (SF)	Frode Kristoffersen (DKF)	Jørgen Nielsen (Venstre)	Tove Nielsen (Venstre)	Eva Gredal (S)	Ejner Hovgård Christiansen (S/ Ind.)	Ove Fich (S)	Bodil Boserup (SF)	Birgit Bjørnvig (People's Movement /June Movement)	Else Hammerich (People's Movement)	Jens-Peter Bonde (People's Movement /June Movement)	Ib Christensen (People's Movement)
1989	Erhard Jakobsen (CD)	Marie Jepsen (DKF)	Christian Rovsing (DKF)	Frode Christensen (CD)	John Iversen (SF)	Niels Kofoed (Venstre)	Klaus Riskær Pedersen (Venstre /Ind.)	Tove Nielsen (Venstre)	Freddy Blak (S)	Ejner Hovgård Christiansen (S/ Ind.)	Kirsten Jensen (S)	Joanna Rønn (S)	Birgit Bjørnvig (People's Movement /June Movement)	Ulla Sandbæk (People's Movement /June Movement)	Jens-Peter Bonde (People's Movement /June Movement)	Ib Christensen (People's Movement)
1993	Erhard Jakobsen (CD)	Marie Jepsen (DKF)	Christian Rovsing (DKF)	Frode Christensen (CD)	John Iversen (SF)	Niels Kofoed (Venstre)	Klaus Riskær Pedersen (Venstre /Ind.)	Tove Nielsen (Venstre)	Freddy Blak (S)	Ejner Hovgård Christiansen (S/ Ind.)	Kirsten Jensen (S)	Joanna Rønn (S)	Birgit Bjørnvig (People's Movement /June Movement)	Ulla Sandbæk (People's Movement /June Movement)	Jens-Peter Bonde (People's Movement /June Movement)	Ib Christensen (People's Movement)
1994	Arne Melchior (CD)	Marie Jepsen (DKF)	Christian Rovsing (DKF)	Frode Christensen (CD)	John Iversen (SF)	Niels Kofoed (Venstre)	Klaus Riskær Pedersen (Venstre /Ind.)	Tove Nielsen (Venstre)	Freddy Blak (S)	Ejner Hovgård Christiansen (S/ Ind.)	Kirsten Jensen (S)	Joanna Rønn (S)	Birgit Bjørnvig (People's Movement /June Movement)	Ulla Sandbæk (People's Movement /June Movement)	Jens-Peter Bonde (People's Movement /June Movement)	Ib Christensen (People's Movement)
1994	Lone Dybkjær (RV)	Poul Schlüter (DKF)	Christian Rovsing (DKF)	Frode Kristoffersen (DKF)	Lilli Gyldenkilde (SF)	Bertel Haarder (Venstre)	Eva Kjer Hansen (Venstre)	Niels Anker Kofoed (Venstre)	Freddy Blak (S)	Karin Riis-Jørgensen (Venstre)	Kirsten Jensen (S)	Niels Sindal (S)	Lis Jensen (People's Movement)	Ulla Sandbæk (People's Movement /June Movement)	Jens-Peter Bonde (People's Movement /June Movement)	Ole Krarup (People's Movement)
1996	Lone Dybkjær (RV)	Poul Schlüter (DKF)	Christian Rovsing (DKF)	Frode Kristoffersen (DKF)	John Iversen (S)	Bertel Haarder (Venstre)	Eva Kjer Hansen (Venstre)	Niels Anker Kofoed (Venstre)	Freddy Blak (S)	Karin Riis-Jørgensen (Venstre)	Kirsten Jensen (S)	Niels Sindal (S)	Lis Jensen (People's Movement)	Ulla Sandbæk (People's Movement /June Movement)	Jens-Peter Bonde (People's Movement /June Movement)	Ole Krarup (People's Movement)
1999	Lone Dybkjær (RV)	Mogens Camre (DF)	Christian Rovsing (DKF)	Jens-Peter Bonde (SF)	Niels Busk (Venstre)	Bertel Haarder (Venstre)	Ole Andreasen (Venstre)	Anne Jensen (Venstre)	Freddy Blak (S)	Karin Riis-Jørgensen (Venstre)	Torben Lund (S)	Helle Thorning-Schmidt (S)	Jens Okking (June Movement)	Ulla Sandbæk (People's Movement /June Movement)	Jens-Peter Bonde (People's Movement /June Movement)	Ole Krarup (People's Movement)
2001	Lone Dybkjær (RV)	Mogens Camre (DF)	Christian Rovsing (DKF)	Jens-Peter Bonde (SF)	Niels Busk (Venstre)	Ole Sørensen (Venstre)	Ole Andreasen (Venstre)	Anne Jensen (Venstre)	Freddy Blak (S)	Karin Riis-Jørgensen (Venstre)	Torben Lund (S)	Helle Thorning-Schmidt (S)	Jens Okking (June Movement)	Ulla Sandbæk (People's Movement /June Movement)	Jens-Peter Bonde (People's Movement /June Movement)	Ole Krarup (People's Movement)
2003	Lone Dybkjær (RV)	Mogens Camre (DF)	Christian Rovsing (DKF)	Jens-Peter Bonde (SF)	Niels Busk (Venstre)	Ole Sørensen (Venstre)	Ole Andreasen (Venstre)	Anne Jensen (Venstre)	Freddy Blak (S)	Karin Riis-Jørgensen (Venstre)	Torben Lund (S)	Helle Thorning-Schmidt (S)	Bent Andersen (People's Movement)	Ulla Sandbæk (People's Movement /June Movement)	Jens-Peter Bonde (People's Movement /June Movement)	Ole Krarup (People's Movement)
2004	Anders Samuelsen (RV)	Mogens Camre (DF)	Gitte Seeberg (DKF)	Margrete Auken (SF)	Niels Busk (Venstre)	Ole Christensen (S)	Henrik Dam Kristensen (S)	Anne Jensen (Venstre)	Dan Jørgensen (S)	Karin Riis-Jørgensen (Venstre)	Britta Thomsen (S)	Poul Rasmussen (S)	14 seats		Jens-Peter Bonde (People's Movement /June Movement)	Ole Krarup (People's Movement)
2006	Anders Samuelsen (RV)	Mogens Camre (DF)	Gitte Seeberg (DKF)	Margrete Auken (SF)	Niels Busk (Venstre)	Ole Christensen (S)	Christel Schaldemose (S)	Anne Jensen (Venstre)	Dan Jørgensen (S)	Karin Riis-Jørgensen (Venstre)	Britta Thomsen (S)	Poul Rasmussen (S)	14 seats		Jens-Peter Bonde (People's Movement /June Movement)	Søren Søndergaard (People's Movement)
2007	Johannes Lebech (RV)	Mogens Camre (DF)	Christian Rovsing (DKF)	Margrete Auken (SF)	Niels Busk (Venstre)	Ole Christensen (S)	Christel Schaldemose (S)	Anne Jensen (Venstre)	Dan Jørgensen (S)	Karin Riis-Jørgensen (Venstre)	Britta Thomsen (S)	Poul Rasmussen (S)	14 seats		Jens-Peter Bonde (People's Movement /June Movement)	Søren Søndergaard (People's Movement)
2008	Johannes Lebech (RV)	Mogens Camre (DF)	Christian Rovsing (DKF)	Margrete Auken (SF)	Niels Busk (Venstre)	Ole Christensen (S)	Christel Schaldemose (S)	Anne Jensen (Venstre)	Dan Jørgensen (S)	Karin Riis-Jørgensen (Venstre)	Britta Thomsen (S)	Poul Rasmussen (S)	14 seats		Hanne Dahl (June Movement)	Søren Søndergaard (People's Movement)
2009	Emilie Turunen (SF)	Morten Messerschmidt (DF)	Bendt Bendtsen (DKF)	Margrete Auken (SF)	Morten Løkkegaard (Venstre)	Ole Christensen (S)	Christel Schaldemose (S)	Anne Jensen (Venstre)	Dan Jørgensen (S)	Jens Rohde (Venstre /RV)	Britta Thomsen (S)	13 seats			Anna Rosbach Andersen (DF)	Søren Søndergaard (People's Movement)
2013	Emilie Turunen (SF)	Morten Messerschmidt (DF)	Bendt Bendtsen (DKF)	Margrete Auken (SF)	Morten Løkkegaard (Venstre)	Ole Christensen (S)	Christel Schaldemose (S)	Anne Jensen (Venstre)	Claus Larsen-Jensen (S)	Jens Rohde (Venstre /RV)	Britta Thomsen (S)	13 seats			Anna Rosbach Andersen (DF)	Søren Søndergaard (People's Movement)
2014	Emilie Turunen (SF)	Morten Messerschmidt (DF)	Bendt Bendtsen (DKF)	Margrete Auken (SF)	Morten Løkkegaard (Venstre)	Ole Christensen (S)	Christel Schaldemose (S)	Anne Jensen (Venstre)	Claus Larsen-Jensen (S)	Jens Rohde (Venstre /RV)	Britta Thomsen (S)	13 seats			Anna Rosbach Andersen (DF)	Rina Ronja Kari (People's Movement)
2014	Anders Primdahl Vistisen (DF)	Morten Messerschmidt (DF)	Bendt Bendtsen (DKF)	Margrete Auken (SF)	Ulla Tørnæs (Venstre)	Ole Christensen (S)	Christel Schaldemose (S)	Anders Primdahl Vistisen (DF)	Jeppe Kofod (S)	Jens Rohde (Venstre /RV)	Morten Helveg Petersen (RV)	13 seats			Jørn Dohrmann (DF)	Rina Ronja Kari (People's Movement)
2015	Anders Primdahl Vistisen (DF)	Morten Messerschmidt (DF)	Bendt Bendtsen (DKF)	Margrete Auken (SF)	Ulla Tørnæs (Venstre)	Ole Christensen (S)	Christel Schaldemose (S)	Anders Primdahl Vistisen (DF)	Jeppe Kofod (S)	Jens Rohde (Venstre /RV)	Morten Helveg Petersen (RV)	13 seats			Jørn Dohrmann (DF)	Rina Ronja Kari (People's Movement)
2016	Anders Primdahl Vistisen (DF)	Morten Messerschmidt (DF)	Bendt Bendtsen (DKF)	Margrete Auken (SF)	Morten Løkkegaard (Venstre)	Ole Christensen (S)	Christel Schaldemose (S)	Anders Primdahl Vistisen (DF)	Jeppe Kofod (S)	Jens Rohde (Venstre /RV)	Morten Helveg Petersen (RV)	13 seats			Jørn Dohrmann (DF)	Rina Ronja Kari (People's Movement)
2019	Søren Gade (Venstre)	Peter Kofod (DF)	Pernille Weiss (DKF)	Margrete Auken (SF)	Morten Løkkegaard (Venstre)	Marianne Vind (S)	Christel Schaldemose (S)	Asger Christensen (Venstre)	Niels Fuglsang (S)	Karen Melchior (RV)	Morten Helveg Petersen (RV)	Linea Søgaard-Lidell (Venstre)	14 seats		Nikolaj Villumsen (EL)	Karsten Hønge* (SF)
2024	Kristoffer Hjort Storm (DD)	Anders Vistisen (DF)	Niels Flemming Hansen (DKF)	Kira Marie Peter-Hansen (SF)	Morten Løkkegaard (Venstre)	Marianne Vind (S)	Christel Schaldemose (S)	Asger Christensen (Venstre)	Niels Fuglsang (S)	Stine Bosse (Moderates)	Sigrid Friis (RV)	Rasmus Nordqvist (SF)	15 seats	Henrik Dahl (LA)	Per Clausen (EL)	Villy Søvndal (SF)

== Elections ==
=== 1979 ===
The 1979 European election was the first direct election to the European Parliament to be held and hence the first time Denmark had voted.

=== 1984 ===
The 1989 European election was the second election to the European Parliament and the second for Denmark.

=== 1989 ===
The 1989 European election was the third election to the European Parliament and the third for Denmark. The election was held on 15 June 1989. The electoral coalitions were between the Social Democrats and Danish Social Liberal Party, the Conservative People's Party and Venstre; the Green Left and People's Movement against the EU; the Centre Democrats and Christian Democrats.

=== 1994 ===
The 1994 European election was the fourth election to the European Parliament and the fourth for Denmark. The election was held on 9 June 1994 for Denmark. The electoral coalitions were between the Danish Social Liberal Party and Christian Democrats; the Conservative People's Party, the Centre Democrats, and Venstre; the June Movement and People's Movement against the EU.

=== 1999 ===
The 1999 European election was the fifth election to the European Parliament and the fifth for Denmark. The electoral coalitions were between the Conservative People's Party, Centre Democrats and Venstre; the June Movement and People's Movement against the EU.

=== 2004 ===
The 2004 European election was the sixth election to the European Parliament and the sixth for Denmark. The election was held on 13 June 2004. The opposition Social Democrats made major gains, mainly at the expense of Eurosceptic parties such as the June Movement. The electoral coalitions were between the Social Democrats and Green Left; the Danish Social Liberal Party and Christian Democrats; the Conservative People's Party and Venstre; the June Movement and People's Movement against the EU. When comparing to straight allocation by party, The People's Movement Against the EU gained one seat at the expense of the Conservative People's Party.

=== 2009 ===
The 2009 European election was the seventh election to the European Parliament and the seventh for Denmark.

=== 2014 ===
The 2014 European election was the eighth election to the European Parliament and the eighth for Denmark.

=== 2019 ===
The 2019 European election was the ninth election to the European Parliament and the ninth for Denmark.

=== 2024 ===
The 2024 European Parliament election in Denmark was the tenth election to the European Parliament and the tenth for Denmark.

== See also ==
- Greenland (European Parliament constituency)
