= Kira Marie Peter-Hansen =

Danish politician (born 1998)

Kira Marie Peter-Hansen MEP
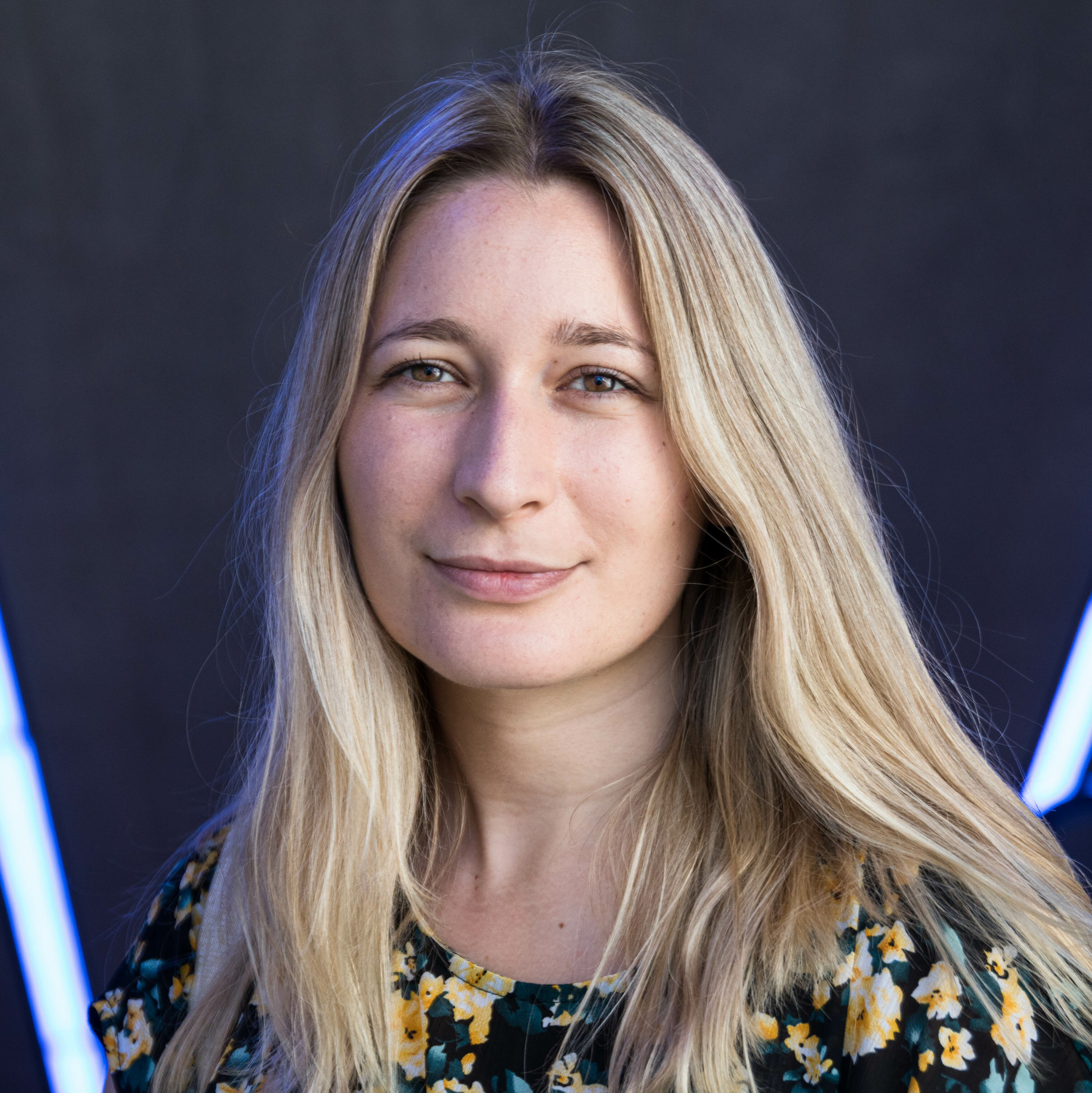
- Peter-Hansen in 2020

Member of the European Parliament for Denmark
- Incumbent
- Assumed office 2 July 2019

Personal details
- Born: 23 February 1998 (age 28) Frederiksberg, Capital Region of Denmark
- Party: Green Left
- Education: The Brussels School of Governance
- Profession: Politician

Kira Marie Peter-Hansen (born 23 February 1998) is a Danish politician. She is a Green Left (part of the Greens–European Free Alliance group) Member of the European Parliament (MEP) elected in 2019 and 2024. In the 2024 election, she was the lead candidate for the party, which ended up with its best ever result at a national election, getting the most votes with 17.4%. She also received 178,438 personal votes, which was the highest of any candidate in that election. Elected at the age of 21, Peter-Hansen is the youngest ever MEP.

== Early life ==
Kira Marie Peter-Hansen was born on 23 February 1998 in Frederiksberg, Capital Region of Denmark. She grew up in Værløse, Furesø Municipality. Peter-Hansen joined the youth wing of the Socialist People's Party, the Youth of the Socialist People's Party in 2015. Peter-Hansen is a financial officer in the organisation. The party is left-wing, socialist, and supports green policy. Prior to her political career, she also worked as a barista. Peter-Hansen was the campaign manager for Astrid Aller's successful election as Copenhagen councillor in the 2017 Danish local elections.

== European Parliament ==
Danish politician Karsten Hønge stood as a candidate for the Socialist People's Party in the 2019 European parliamentary election. He was second on the party's list, and was elected as one of its two MEPs (the other being Margrete Auken) in Denmark. However he chose not to take his seat to seek re-election in the 2019 Danish general election.

Peter-Hansen was nominated to become an MEP, in his place, as she had received the next highest number of votes of any of the party's candidates. At the age of 21 years, 3 months, and 3 days, she is the youngest ever MEP. The previous youngest was the German politician Ilka Schröder who was one month older when she was elected as an Alliance 90/The Greens MEP in the 1999 European parliamentary election. In order to concentrate on her political career, Peter-Hansen dropped out of her economics course at Copenhagen University.

In the European Parliament, Peter-Hansen is a member of the Committee on Employment and Social Affairs, in which she serves as coordinator for the Greens, and a substitute member of the Committee on Economic and Monetary Affairs. In 2020, she also joined the Subcommittee on Tax Matters.

In addition to her committee assignments, Peter-Hansen is part of the parliament's delegation for relations with India. She is also a member of the European Parliament Intergroup on LGBT Rights and the European Parliament Intergroup on Trade Unions.

Since 2021, Peter-Hansen has been serving as vice-chair of the Greens–European Free Alliance group, under the leadership of co-chairs Ska Keller and Philippe Lamberts.

In September 2022, Peter-Hansen was the recipient of the People's Choice: Best Young Leader Award at The Parliament Magazine's annual MEP Awards In March 2024, she was one of twenty MEPs to be given a "Rising Star" award at that year's MEP Awards ceremony.

== Political positions ==
Peter-Hansen has described her main priorities in parliament to be to promote environmentally friendly policy, and to renegotiate the Common Agricultural Policy. Peter-Hansen also advocates for LGBT rights.
