= Jeanette Oppenheim =

Danish lawyer and politician (born 1952)

Jeanette Oppenheim MEP

Member of European Parliament for Denmark
- In office 24 July 1984 – 24 July 1989

Member of the Copenhagen City Council
- In office 1982–1984

Personal details
- Born: 14 August 1952 (age 73) Frederiksberg, Denmark
- Party: Conservative People's Party

Jeanette Oppenheim (born 14 August 1952) is a Danish lawyer and politician. A member of the Conservative People's Party, Oppenheim served in the European Parliament from 1984 until 1989.

== Biography ==
Jeanette Oppenheim was born on 14 August 1952 in Frederiksberg, Denmark. After receiving a degree in law, Oppenheim was elected to the Copenhagen City Council, serving from 1982 until 1984 as a member of the Conservative People's Party.

Oppenheim was elected to the European Parliament following the 1984 election, receiving 8,572 votes. Oppenheim sat as a member of the European Democrats, and served on the Committee on Economic and Monetary Affairs and the Committee on Petitions. She was also a member of the European delegation to the Contadora group in Latin America. During her tenure, Oppenheim spoke of "Denmark's importance in Europe". After protests in Denmark erupted following American president Ronald Reagan's statement that the United States would begin producing neutron bombs, Oppenheim and other conservative politicians led a counter-protest, in which she and 24 others travelled to Moscow to protest the Soviet Union's placement of nuclear weapons on the Kola Peninsula and in submarines in the Baltic Sea. Oppenheim left the European Parliament at the end of her term in 1989. In the 1994 Danish general election, Oppenheim ran for the Folketing, standing in the Bispeengkredsen. She was defeated by Frank Dahlgaard, also of the Conservative People's Party, receiving 4,546 votes to Dahlgaard's 8,219.

Following her political career, Oppenheim continued practicing law. In 1999, she represented a housing cooperative that planned to build a housing block on Folkets Park in the Nørrebro district of Copenhagen, a project strongly opposed by local residents. The following year, the Copenhagen City Council negotiated a compromise between the housing cooperative and the Nørrebro district council; the compromise scrapped the plans to build over the park, but stipulated that the housing project would still be constructed elsewhere in the district. The decision also saw Oppenheim paid 4.4 million kroner (US$544,343) in compensation for the abandoned project. Later in 2000, Oppenheim represented a housing cooperative in the Valby district during legal action against the Norwegian Energy Regulatory Authority regarding the payment of investments to the Danish Energy Agency.

As of 2019, Oppenheim is an executive member of the Public Information Association (Folkeligt Oplysningsforbund), serving as chairman of speech at the Danish language school in Hovedstaden.
