= Karen Melchior =

Danish lawyer and politician (born 1980)

Karen Melchior MEP
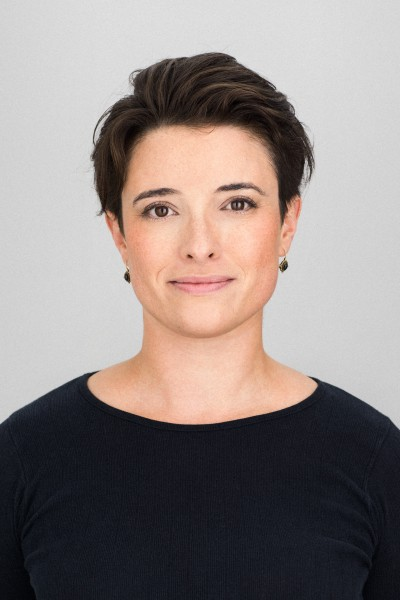

Member of the European Parliament for Denmark
- Incumbent
- Assumed office 2 July 2019

Personal details
- Born: 15 October 1980 (age 45) Copenhagen, Denmark
- Party: Social Liberal Party (until August 2022)
- Education: University of Copenhagen
- Website: https://karenmelchior.eu/

Karen Melchior (born 15 October 1980) is a Danish lawyer and politician, formerly of the Social Liberal Party, who has served as a Member of the European Parliament in 2019–2024.

== Political career ==
=== Career in local politics ===
Melchior was a member of the Copenhagen Municipal Council. In the council, she served on the Social Committee and the Health and Care Committee from the local elections of 2017 as a member of the Social Liberal Party.

Melchior ran on the Danish Social Liberal Party's ticket in the European Parliament Election of 2014, where she was elected to the position of first alternate MEP for the party.

=== Member of the European Parliament, 2019–2024 ===
Melchior was eventually elected to the European Parliament in 2019. She has since been serving on the Committee on Legal Affairs and on the Committee on Women's Rights and Gender Equality.

In addition to her committee assignments, Melchior was part of the parliament's delegations to the EU-Armenia Parliamentary Partnership Committee, the EU-Azerbaijan Parliamentary Cooperation Committee and the EU-Georgia Parliamentary Association Committee, as well as to the Euronest Parliamentary Assembly. She was also a member of the European Parliament Intergroup on Anti-Corruption, the European Parliament Intergroup on LGBT Rights, the European Internet Forum, the Responsible Business Conduct Working Group, and the Spinelli Group.

Melchior resigned from the Social Liberal Party in August 2022 but remained a member of the European Parliament until the end of her mandate.

=== Alleged harassment of employees ===
In 2021, it was alleged that Melchior on several occasions harassed her assistants in her office in the European Parliament. At least three of her assistants ended up on sick leave due to the harassment. In May 2022, her Danish party, the Social Liberal Party, requested her to resign from the European Parliament immediately and declared that she will not be allowed to run for the party for the next election to the European Parliament, followed by her leaving the party.
