= Erik Poulsen (Danish politician) =

Danish MEP (born 1967)

Erik Poulsen MEP
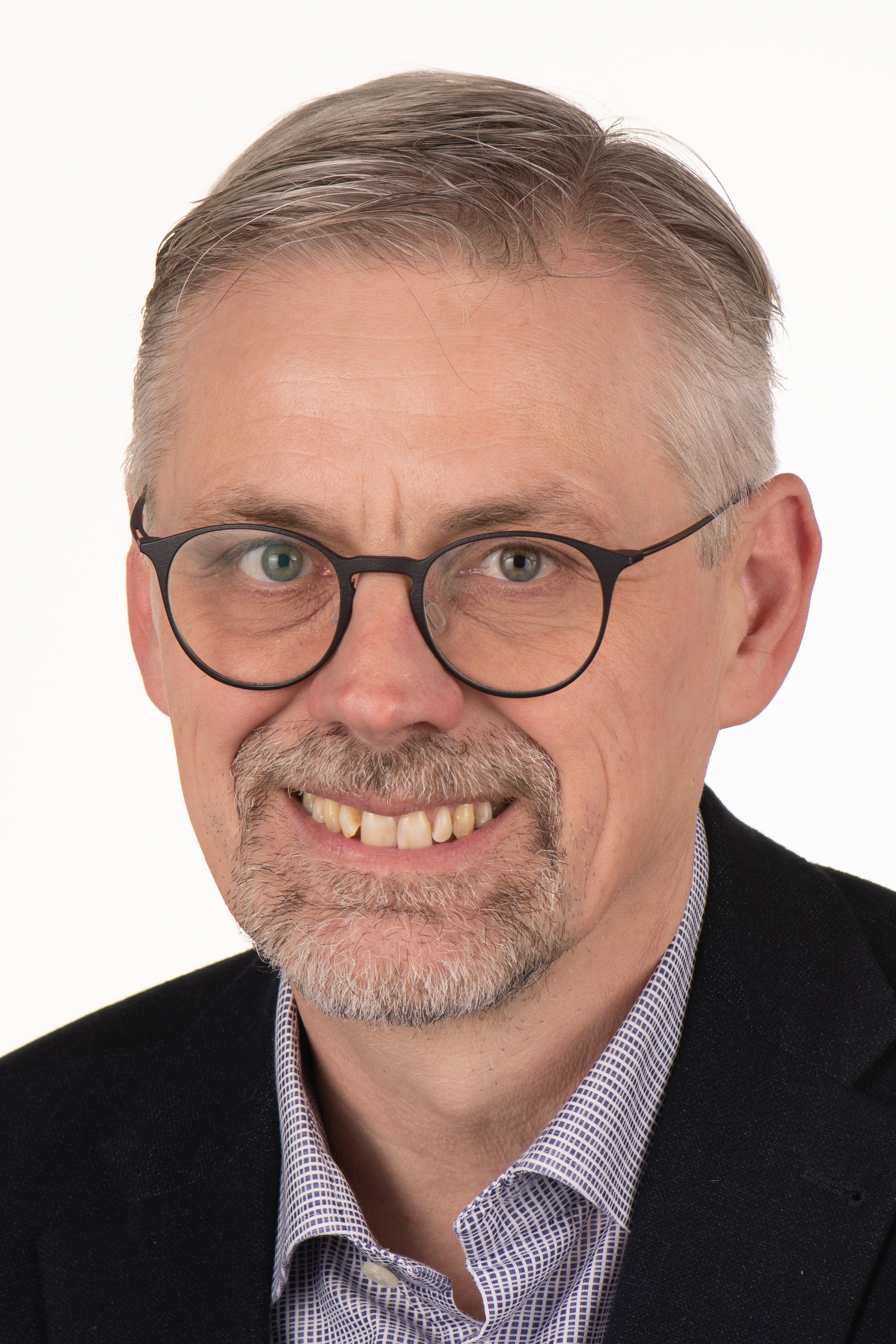

Member of the European Parliament for Denmark
- Incumbent
- Assumed office 14 November 2022
- Preceded by: Søren Gade

Personal details
- Born: 16 June 1967 (age 58) Holstebro, Denmark
- Party: Venstre

Erik Poulsen (born 16 June 1967) is a Danish politician who has been serving as a Member of the European Parliament for the Venstre since 2022.

== See also ==
- List of members of the European Parliament for Denmark, 2019–2024
