= Asger Christensen =

Danish politician (born 1958)

Asger Christensen MEP
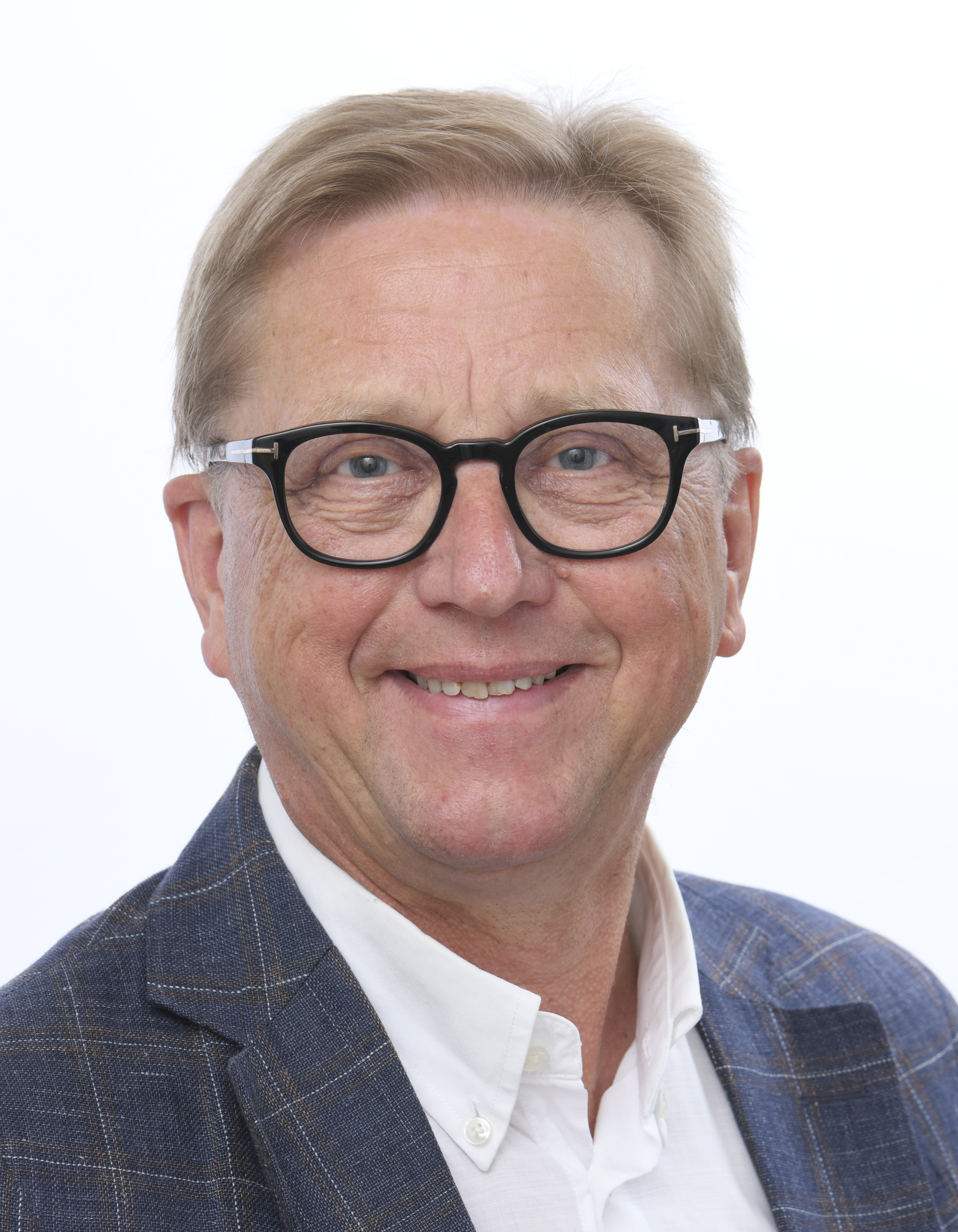

Member of the European Parliament for Denmark
- Incumbent
- Assumed office 2 July 2019

Personal details
- Born: 8 January 1958 (age 68) Tarm

Asger Christensen (born 8 January 1958) is a Danish politician who was elected as a Member of the European Parliament in 2019.

== Early career ==
Christensen, a farmer, has owned a farm since 1982. He is from Tarm.

== Political career ==
In parliament, Christensen is part of the parliamentary group Renew Europe since his national party affiliation is with Venstre. He serves on the Committee on Agriculture and Rural Development. In 2020, he also joined the Committee of Inquiry on the Protection of Animals during Transport.

In addition to his committee assignments, Christensen is part of the parliament's delegation for relations with China. He is also a member of the European Parliament Intergroup on LGBT Rights.
