= Frode Kristoffersen =

Danish politician and journalist (1931–2016)

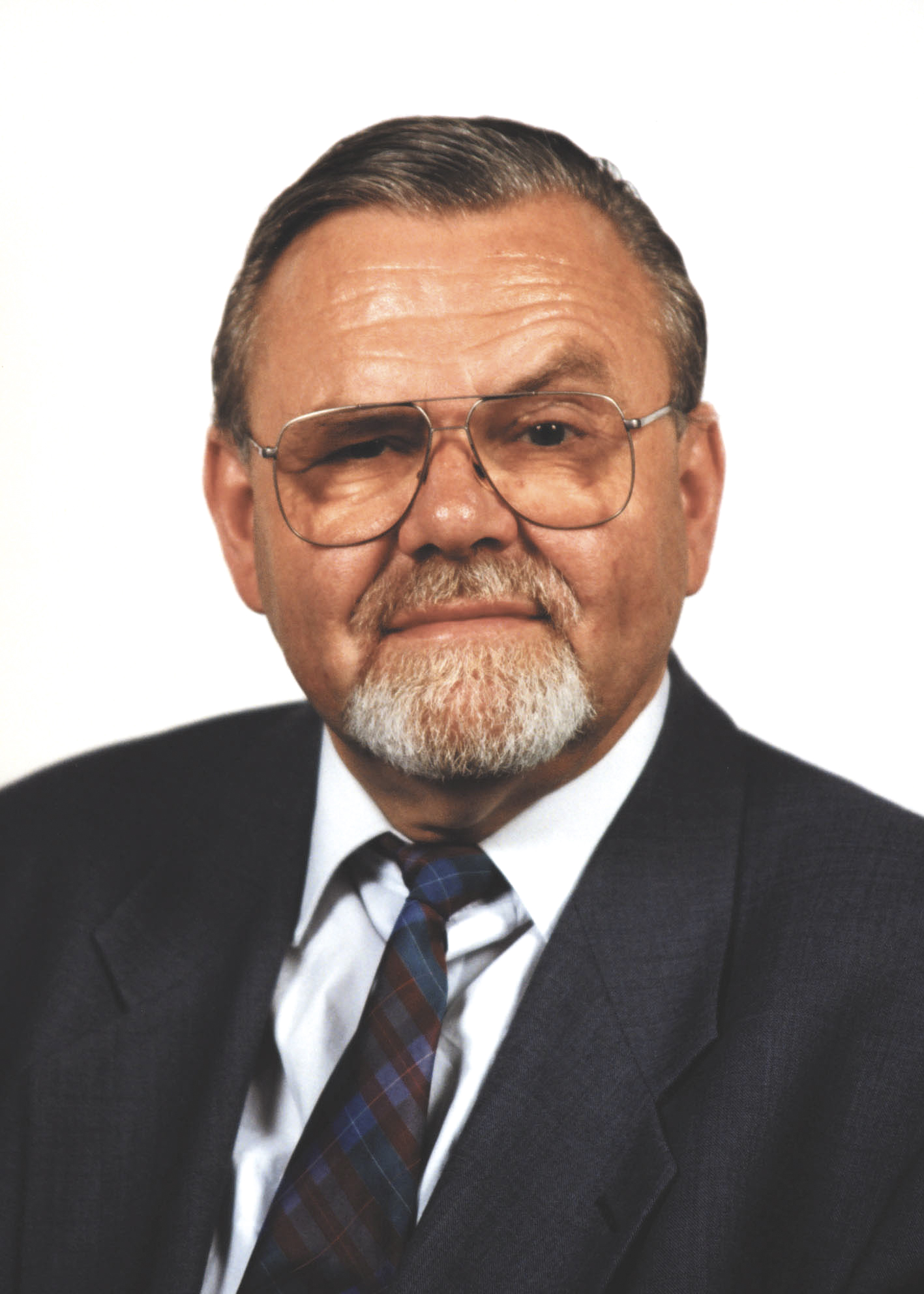
- Kristoffersen in 1994

Member of the European Parliament for Denmark
- In office 19 July 1994 – 20 July 1999

Personal details
- Born: Frode Jelling Kristoffersen; 9 August 1931 Sønderborg, Denmark
- Died: 20 March 2016 (aged 84) Aabenraa, Denmark
- Party: Conservative People's Party
- Occupation: Journalist

Frode Jelling Kristoffersen (9 August 1931 – 20 March 2016) was a Danish journalist and politician who was a Member of the European Parliament from 1994 to 1999. He worked for various Danish media outlets.

== Biography ==
Kristoffersen was born in Sønderborg, Southern Jutland, on 9 August 1931. He started his career as a trainee journalist at Tønder Amtstidende in 1948. He worked for various Danish newspapers such as Jyllands-Posten, Vestkysten, and Dagens Nyheter until 1961. Then he joined the Danmarks Radio (DR) and was its correspondent in different European cities, including Berlin, London, Brussels, Strasbourg and Bonn, until 1979. Next he was the presenter and producer of a program about the history of Southern Jutland entitled Frodes Historier on TV Syd in 2002 and 2010.

He became a substitute member of the European Parliament in 1988. He served there between 1994 and 1999 for the Conservative People's Party.

Kristoffersen died in Aabenraa on 20 March 2016 after a long illness.

His book, Journalist i byen: med unge Frode rundt i landet, was published in 2021. It is about the Danish cities and magazines where Frode Kristoffersen lived and worked.
