= Niels Flemming Hansen =

Danish politician (born 1974)

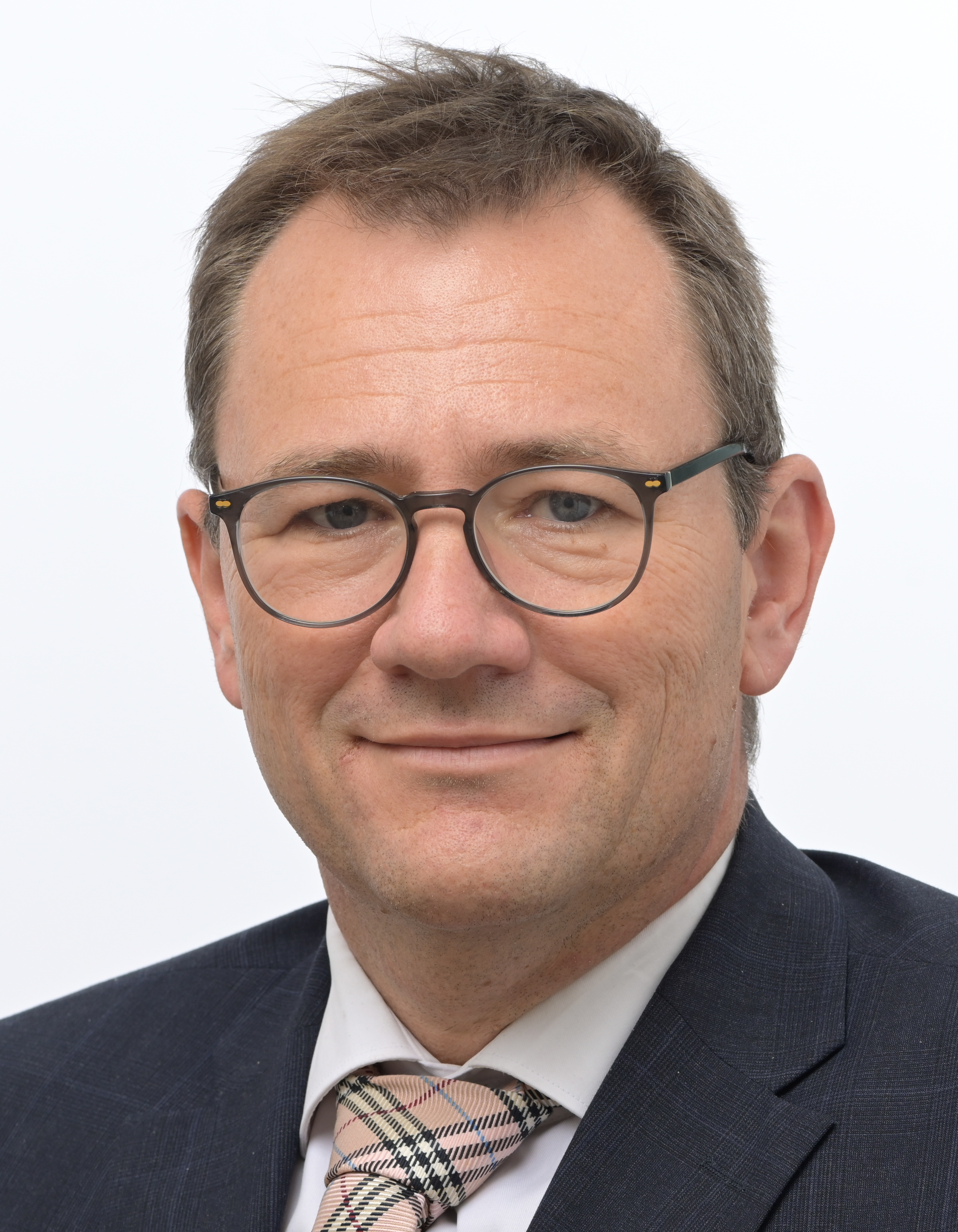
- Official portrait, 2024

Member of the European Parliament for Denmark
- Incumbent
- Assumed office 16 July 2024

Member of the Folketing
- In office 5 June 2019 – 15 July 2024
- Succeeded by: Frederik Bloch Münster
- Constituency: South Jutland

Personal details
- Born: 16 May 1974 (age 52) Vejle, Denmark
- Party: Conservative People's Party
- Parent: Flemming Hansen (father)

Niels Flemming Lærkeborg Hansen (born 16 May 1974) is a Danish politician who is a member of the European Parliament for the Conservative People's Party. He was elected into the Danish Folketing at the 2019 Danish general election. In October 2023, he was elected the lead candidate for the Conservative People's Party for the European parliament election 2024.

== Political career ==
Hansen was elected into parliament after the 2019 election, where he received 3,780 votes, and was reelected in 2022 with 2,452 votes.
