= Anna Rosbach =

Danish politician

Anna Rosbach Andersen MEP
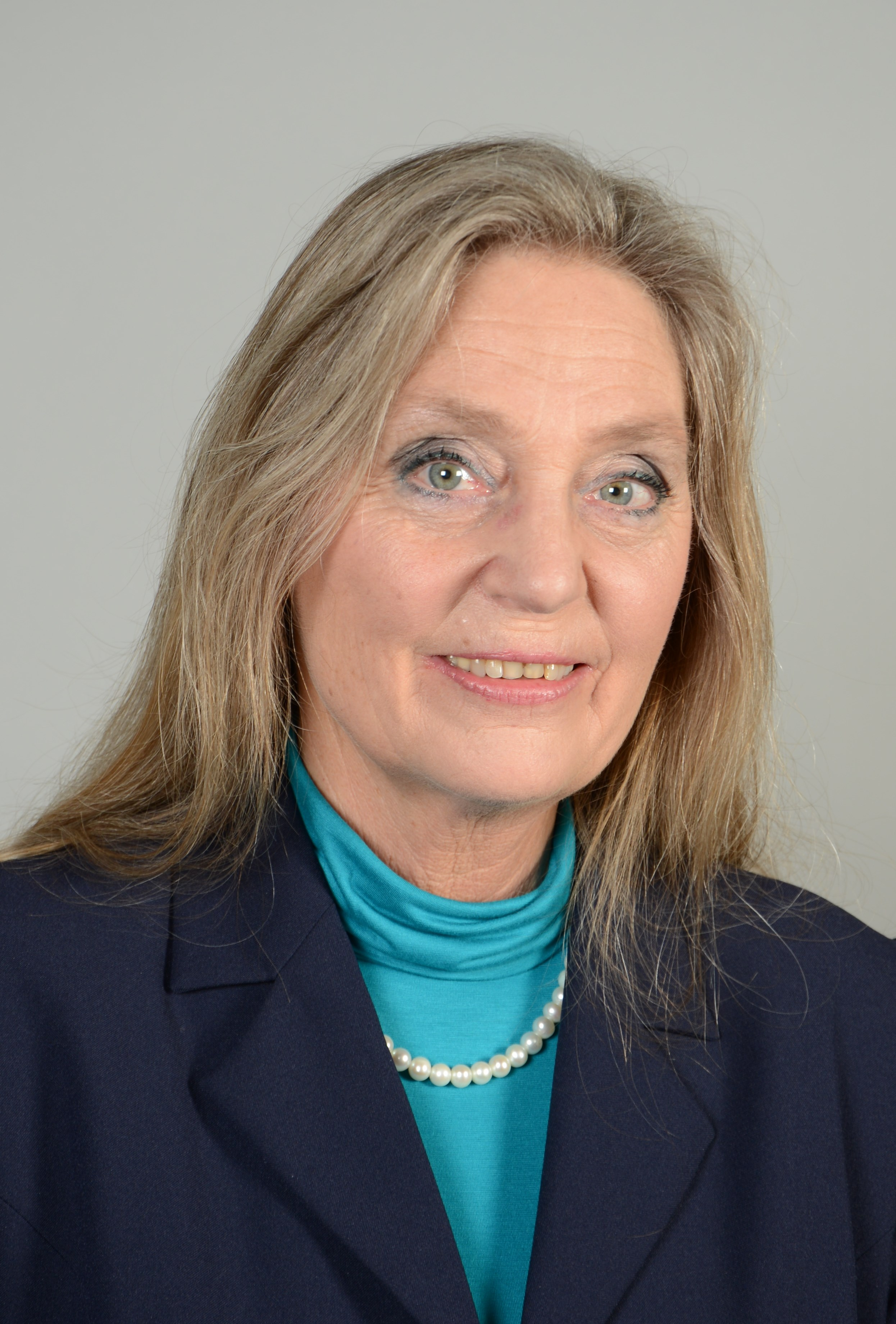

Member of the European Parliament
- In office 14 July 2009 – 1 July 2014
- Constituency: Denmark

Personal details
- Born: 2 February 1947 (age 79)
- Party: Independent
- Other political affiliations: Danish People's Party (until 2011)

Anna Rosbach Andersen (born 2 February 1947) is a Danish politician and Member of the European Parliament. She is an independent sitting in the European Conservatives and Reformists (ECR). She was elected for the Danish People's Party (DF), but left in March 2011.

She joined the recently established political party Fokus, which aimed to run in the European Parliament elections in 2014.
