= Emilie Turunen =

Danish politician

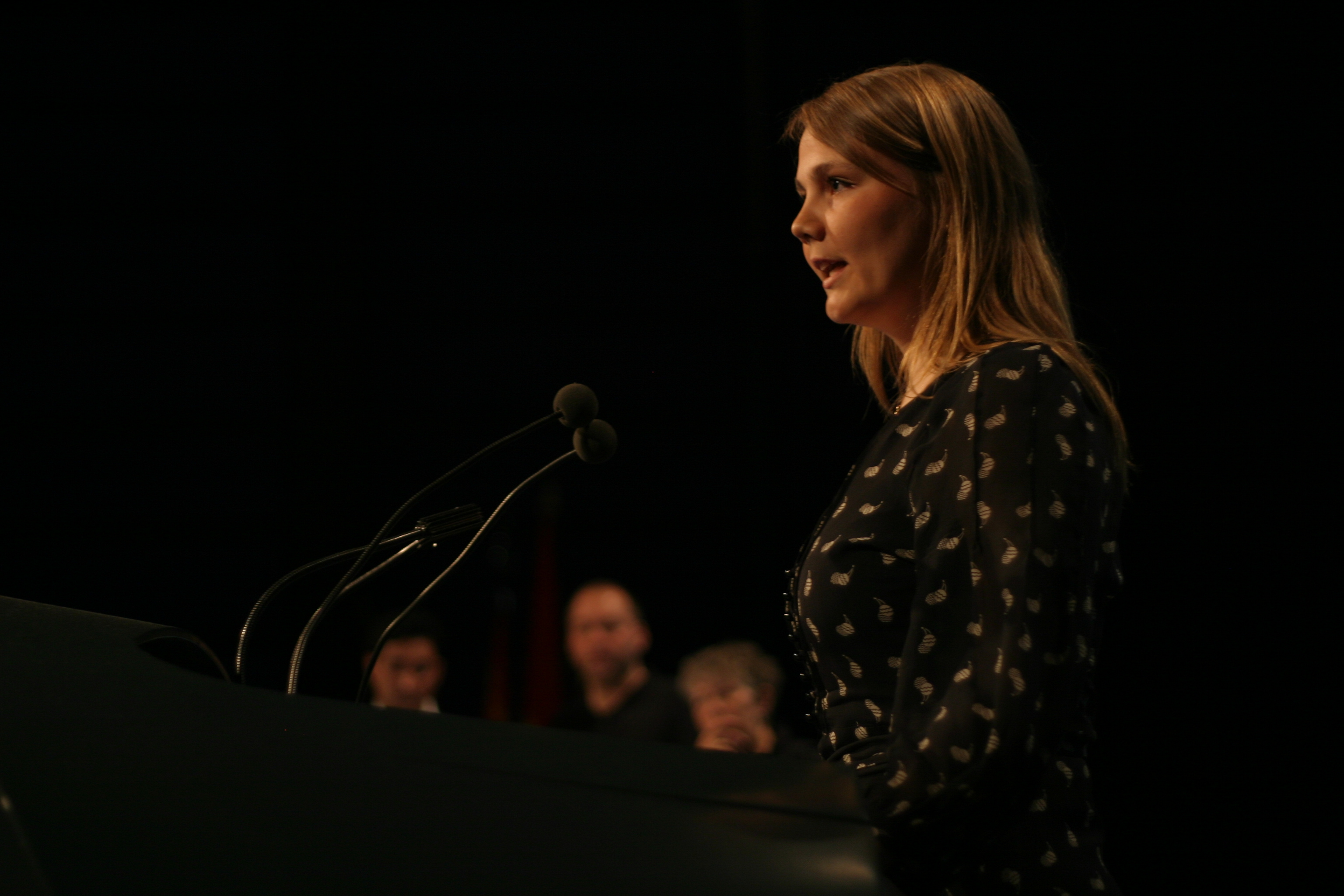

Member of the European Parliament for Denmark
- In office 14 July 2009 – 1 July 2014

Personal details
- Born: 13 May 1984 (age 42) Copenhagen, Denmark
- Party: Social Democrat / PES
- Education: Roskilde University
- Occupation: Politician
- Profession: Politician

Emilie Turunen (born 13 May 1984) is a former Member of the European Parliament (MEP). She was elected to represent the Danish constituency in the 2009 European election as a member of the Socialistisk Folkeparti and the European Green Party. She later switched party affiliation to the Social Democrats and the Party of European Socialists.

== Life ==
Turunen graduated from Roskilde University in Social Science and Working Life Studies and lives with her boyfriend in northwest Copenhagen. Before being elected she was in charge of the Youth of the Socialist People's Party and worked with the Danish Social Forum.

== In Parliament ==
After being elected to the European Parliament, Turunen has become vice-chairperson of the Green-Free Alliance group, a member of the Internal Market and Consumer Protection Committee, a member of the delegation to Southeast Asia. She is also a substitute on the Employment and Social Affair Committee, the Special Committee on the Financial, Economic and Social Crisis and the delegation to Iran. She is particularly active against the trafficking of women. After Swedish MEP Amelia Andersdotter, Turunen is also the youngest MEP of the 7th European Parliament. On March 20, 2013, she left Socialistisk Folkeparti for the Social Democrat.
