= Stine Bosse =

Danish businesswoman (born 1960)

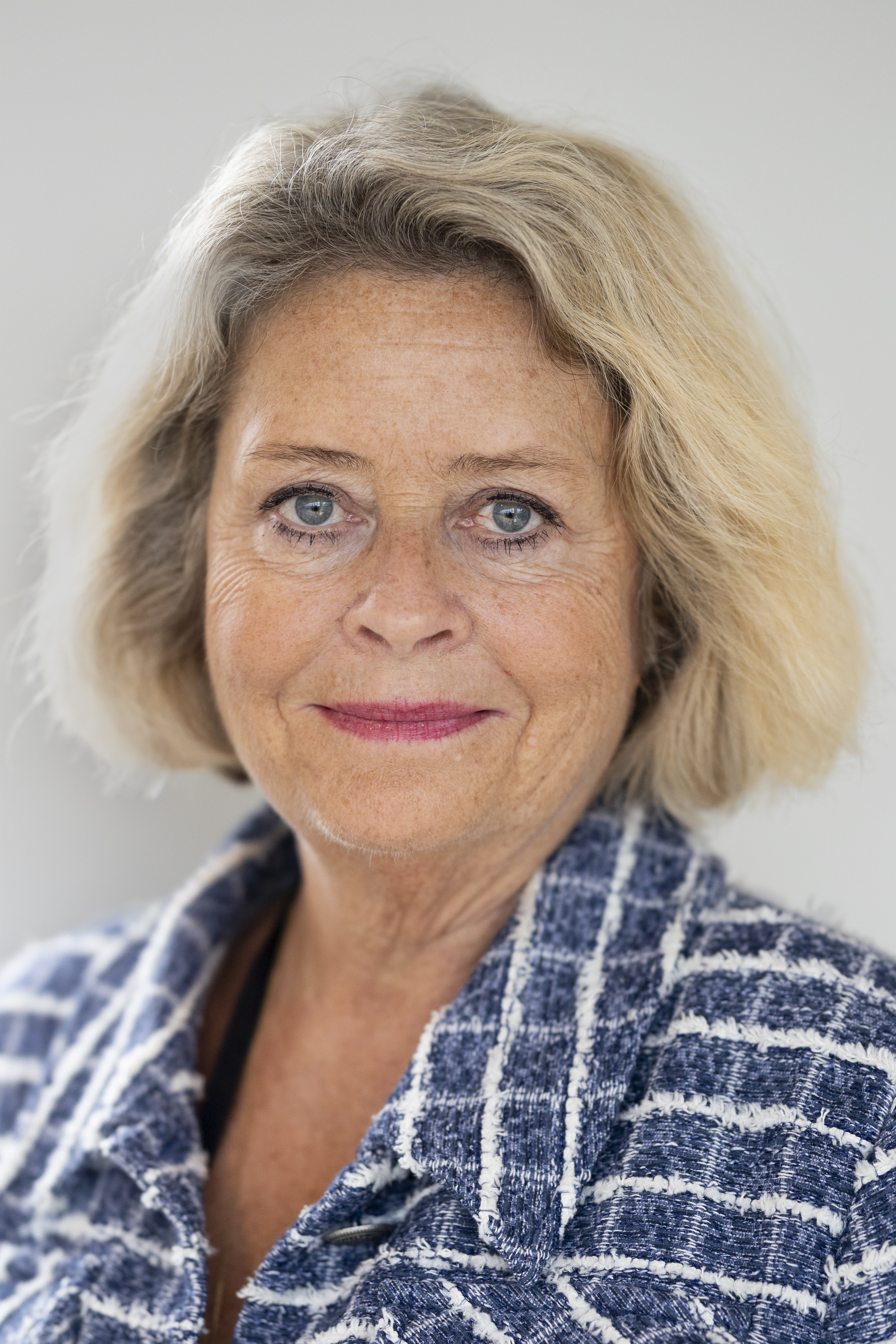
- Official portrait, 2025

Member of the European Parliament for Denmark
- Incumbent
- Assumed office 16 July 2024

Personal details
- Born: Christine Bosse; 21 December 1960 (age 65) Virum, Lyngby-Taarbæk Municipality, Copenhagen, Denmark
- Party: Moderates (2022–present)
- Children: 2
- Education: University of Copenhagen
- Occupation: Businesswoman • politician
- Awards: Order of the Dannebrog; Order of Merit of the Federal Republic of Germany

Christine "Stine" Bosse (born 21 December 1960) is a Danish businesswoman and Member of the European Parliament. Bosse led the Moderates's list for the 2024 European election.

== Early life and education ==
Bosse gained a Masters of Law degree from the University of Copenhagen in 1987.

She was born in Virum.

== Career ==
Upon graduation, Bosse began working for TrygVesta, a Nordic insurance agency, rising up the ranks until she became an executive manager in 1999. In 2003 she was appointed CEO, and in 2009 the Financial Times identified her as "the 22nd most influential businesswoman in the world".

The United Nations appointed Bosse as an Advocate for the Millennium Development Goals in 2010, and she left TrygVesta in 2011, becoming a professional board member and subject-matter expert. In 2015 she was appointed President of the European Movement in Denmark, taking over from Anne E. Jensen, and separately became the new Chair of the Board of BankNordik. She is also President of the Royal Danish Theatre, a Member of the Board of Allianz, a non-executive director of Aker, and serves as an adjunct professor at the University of Copenhagen in the Department of Operations Management.

She was elected to the European Parliament for the Moderates in the 2024 European Parliament election.

== Other activities ==
- European Council on Foreign Relations (ECFR), Member
