= Morten Helveg Petersen =

Danish politician (born 1966)

Morten Helveg Petersen MEP
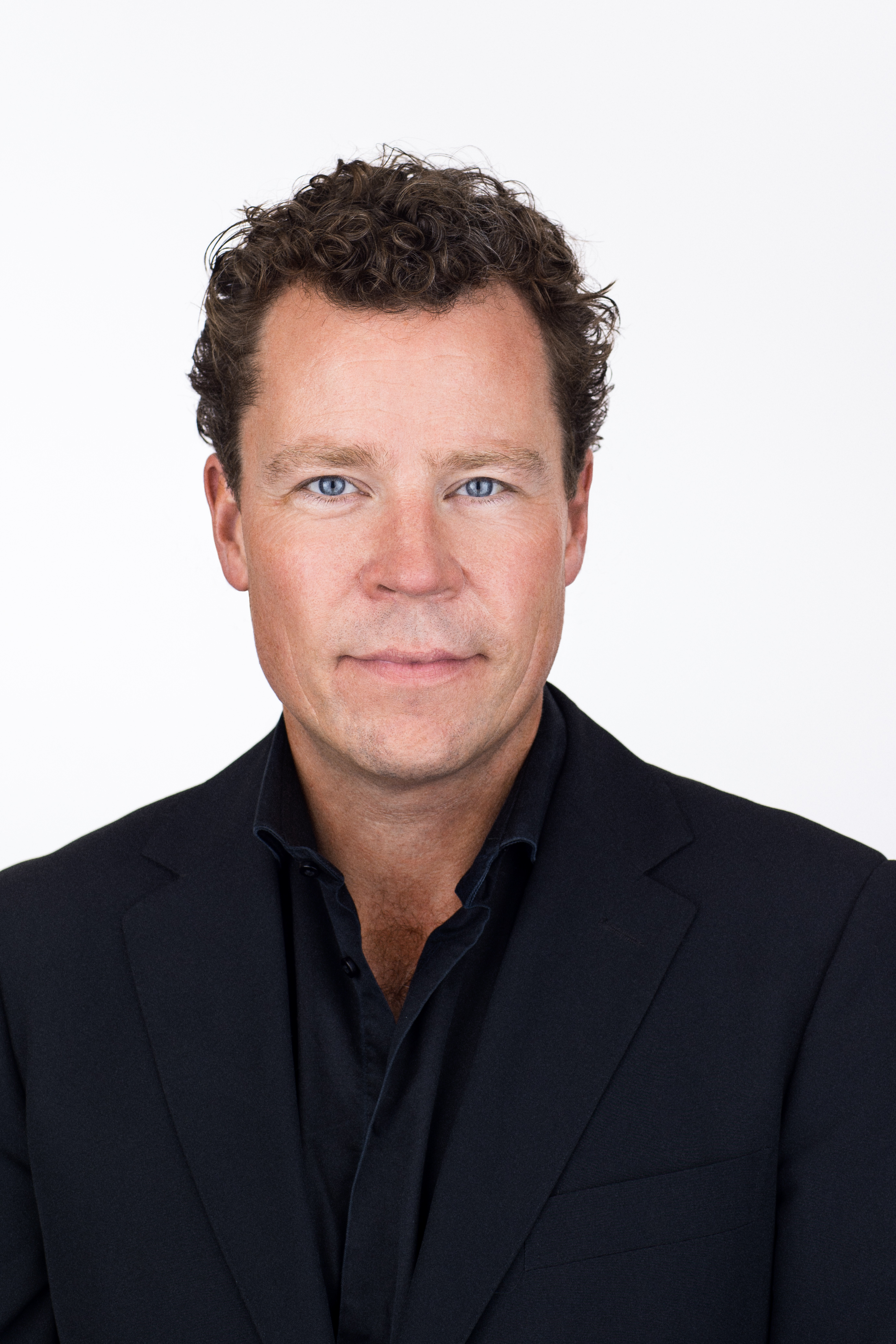
- Portrait of Morten Helveg Petersen

Member of the European Parliament
- Incumbent
- Assumed office 1 July 2014
- Constituency: Denmark

Personal details
- Born: 14 September 1966 (age 60) Copenhagen, Denmark
- Party: Danish; Danish Social Liberal Party; EU; Alliance of Liberals and Democrats for Europe
- Children: 2
- Education: University of Copenhagen

Morten Helveg Petersen (born 14 September 1966) is a Danish politician who has been serving as a Member of the European Parliament (MEP) since 2014. He is a member of the Danish Social Liberal Party, which is affiliated to the Alliance of Liberals and Democrats for Europe Party, and sits in the Renew Europe group in the European Parliament. He was elected to the European Parliament in 2014 and 2019 and served as member of the Folketing 1998–2009.

== Early life and education ==
The son of former Danish foreign minister Niels Helveg Petersen and brother of former minister Rasmus Helveg Petersen, Morten Helveg Petersen grew up in Denmark and in Brussels where he attended the European School, Brussels I from 1974 to 1977. His paternal grandparents were former minister Kristen Helveg Petersen and former mayor of Copenhagen Lilly Helveg Petersen. He got a Master of Science degree in economics from the University of Copenhagen in 1992.

== Career ==
After finishing his studies, Petersen worked for the European Commission 1992–1993 and for the Confederation of Danish Industries1993–1998.

He then entered politics and served as a member of the Folketing from Hvidovre and later Brøndby electoral district 1999 where he obtained positions as the Social Liberal Party's spokesperson on finance, defence and IT. In 2007, he lost a fight to become deputy leader of the party's parliamentarian group to Morten Østergaard.

In 2009 Petersen temporarily left politics and became CEO of Foreningen af Danske Interaktive Medier and after a company merger became vice-CEO of Danske Medier in 2011.

In September 2013, the Danish Social Liberal Party nominated him as their top candidate in the 2014 European Parliament election. Petersen won a seat in the parliament after the party received 6,7% of the votes in election; thus returning to the parliament with one mandate. He was re-elected in 2019.

In Parliament, he serves on the Committee on Industry, Research and Energy. In addition to his committee assignments, he has been a member of the Parliament's delegations for relations with Japan (2014–2019) and to the EU-Turkey Joint Parliamentary Committee (since 2019). He is also a member of the European Internet Forum and of the European Parliament Intergroup on LGBT Rights.

== Political positions ==
Petersen is considered to belong to the right flank of the party and was opposed to the party's decision to be part of Prime Minister Helle Thorning-Schmidt's coalition government.

== Books ==
- Midt i maskinrummet (1999)
- Enter – et personligt bud på Danmarks IT-fremtid (2001)
