= Ole Andreasen =

Danish politician (1939–2026)

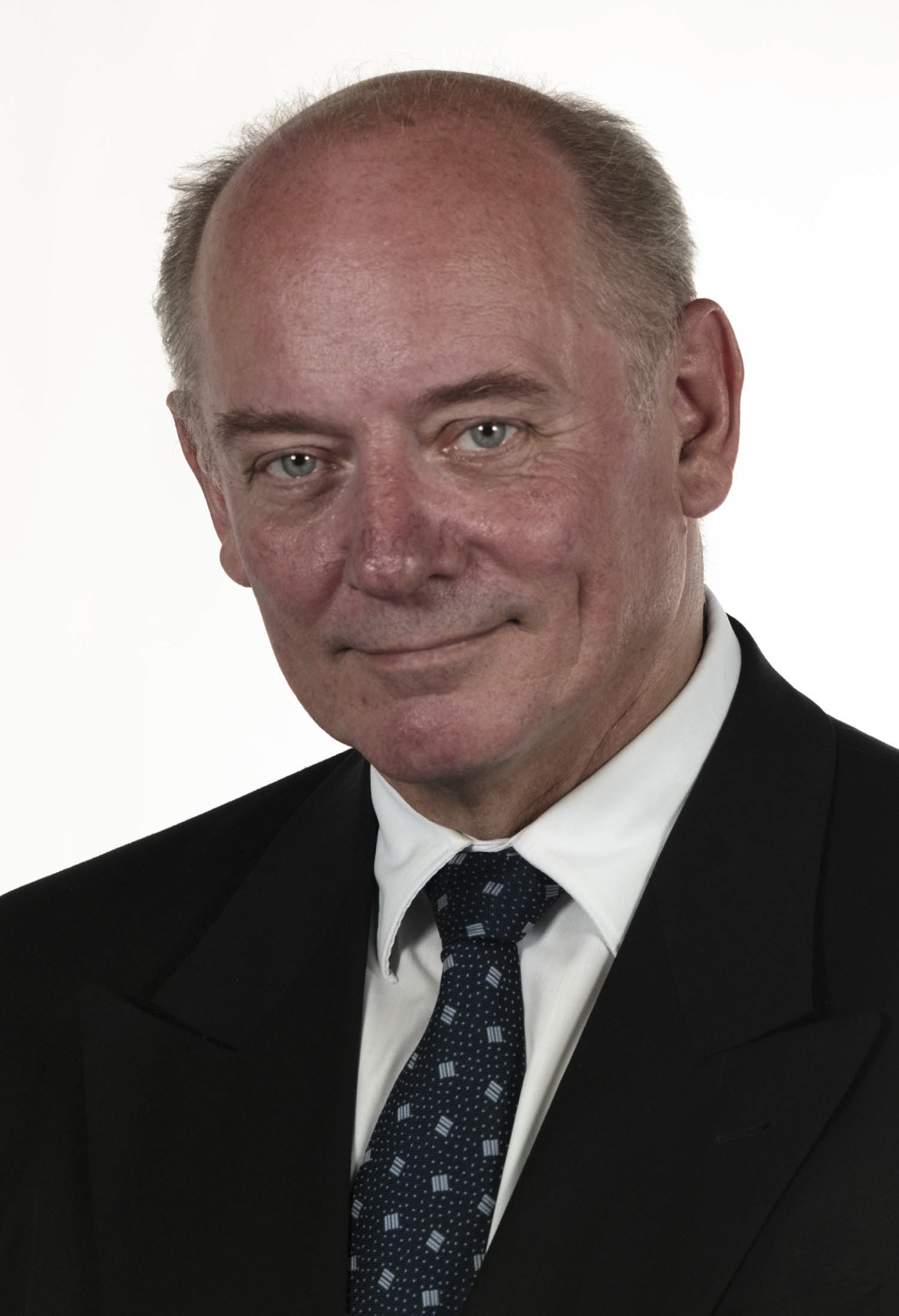
Andreasen in 1999

Ole Andreasen (30 July 1939 – 26 August 2026) was a Danish politician and journalist. He served as a member of the European Parliament from 1999 to 2004.

Andreasen was the onetime editor-in-chief of Fyns Tidende and was the parliament's rapporteur on information policy.

== Life and career ==
Andreasen was born in Frederiksberg, Denmark on 30 July 1939.

From 1958 to 1975, Andreasen worked in journalism for Vestkysten, Børsen, Kristeligt Dagblad, Venstrepressens Bureau, and Fyns Tidende. From 1976 to 1999, Andreasen worked in business for the Carlsberg Group. From 1978 to 1982, Andreasen was on the municipal council of the Gentofte Municipality. In 1999, he was elected to the European Parliament, where he served one term until 2004 as part of the Fifth European Parliament.

From 1999 to 2004, Andreasen was affiliated with the political party Venstre and the European Liberal Democrat and Reform Party Group.

Andreasen died on 26 August 2026, at the age of 87.

== See also ==
- List of members of the European Parliament for Denmark, 1999–2004
