= Marianne Vind =

Danish politician (born 1970)

Marianne Vind MEP
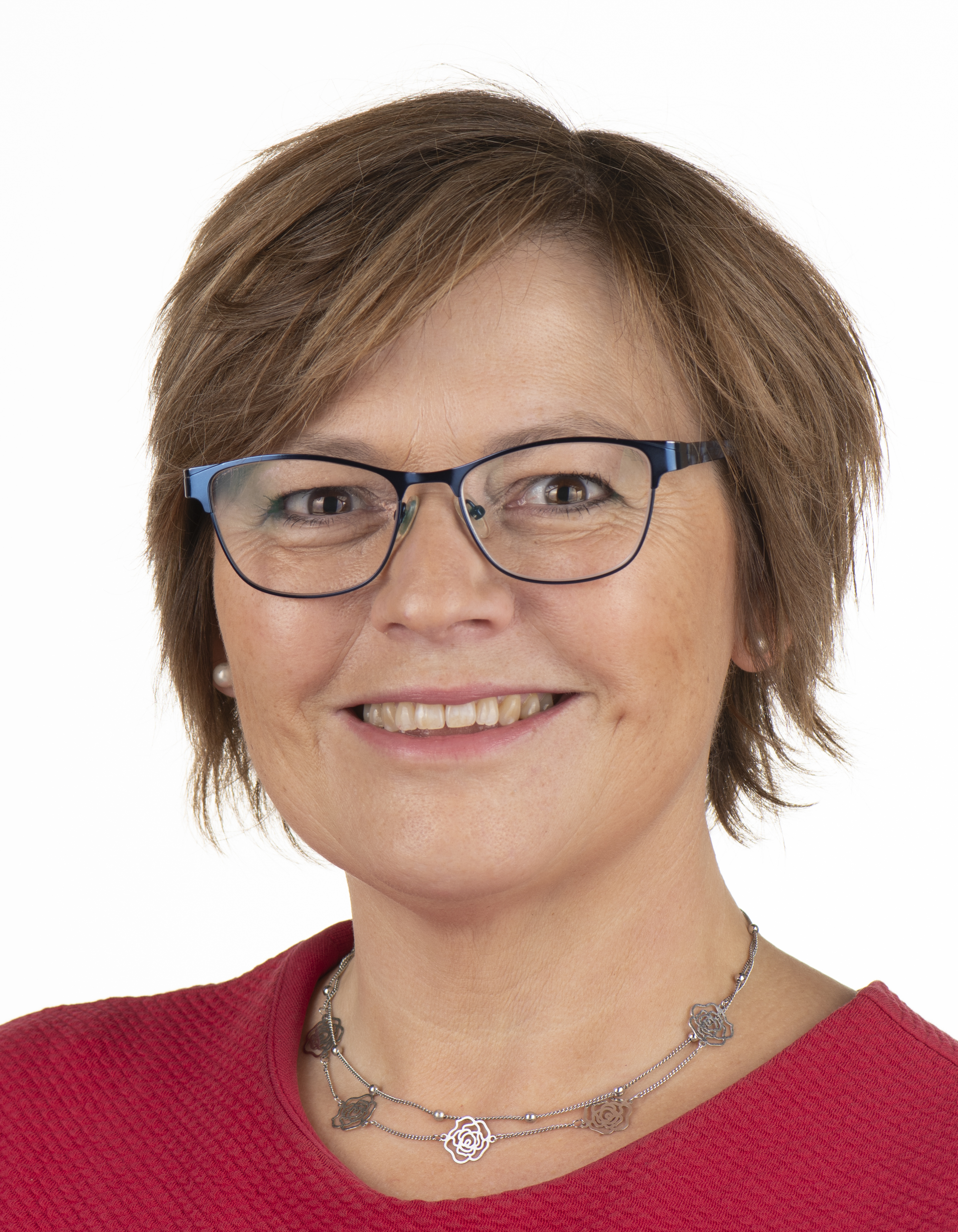

Member of the European Parliament for Denmark
- Incumbent
- Assumed office 2019

Personal details
- Born: 3 December 1970 (age 55) Køge, Denmark
- Party: Social Democrats
- Education: Roskilde University

Marianne Vind (born December 3, 1970) is a Danish trade unionist politician who since June 2019 has been a member of the European Parliament for the Social Democrats, when she replaced Jeppe Kofod. She is a member of the Committee of Employment and Social Affairs as well as the Committee of Transport and Tourism.

== Early life and education ==
Born in Køge in 1970, the family first moved to Vigersted by Ringsted and later to Svebølle near Kalundborg where Vind had most of her childhood, adolescence and adult life. In Svebølle, Vinds mother worked at the local kindergarten, provided daycare and worked as a cleaning assistant while her father worked as a lorry driver for BKI-Kaffe.

After receiving her degree in 1995, she worked as hospital laboratory technician from Rigshospitalet. The degree led to several jobs, including a year in Norway and later in 2000 a job in Novozymes in Kalundborg. Marianne Vind was elected as a union representative and later chair for Dansk Laborant-Forening (2006–2011). She also obtained a master diploma in Communication from Roskilde University.

== Early career ==
Before entering European politics, Vind served as vice-president of Danish trade union HK/Private from 2011 until 2019.

== Political career ==
In addition to her committee assignments, Vind is part of the parliament's delegation for relations with the countries of Southeast Asia and the Association of Southeast Asian Nations (ASEAN). She is also a member of the European Parliament Intergroup on LGBT Rights, the European Parliament Intergroup on Disability and the European Parliament Intergroup on Trade Unions.
