= Niels Fuglsang =

Danish politician (born 1985)

Niels Fuglsang MEP
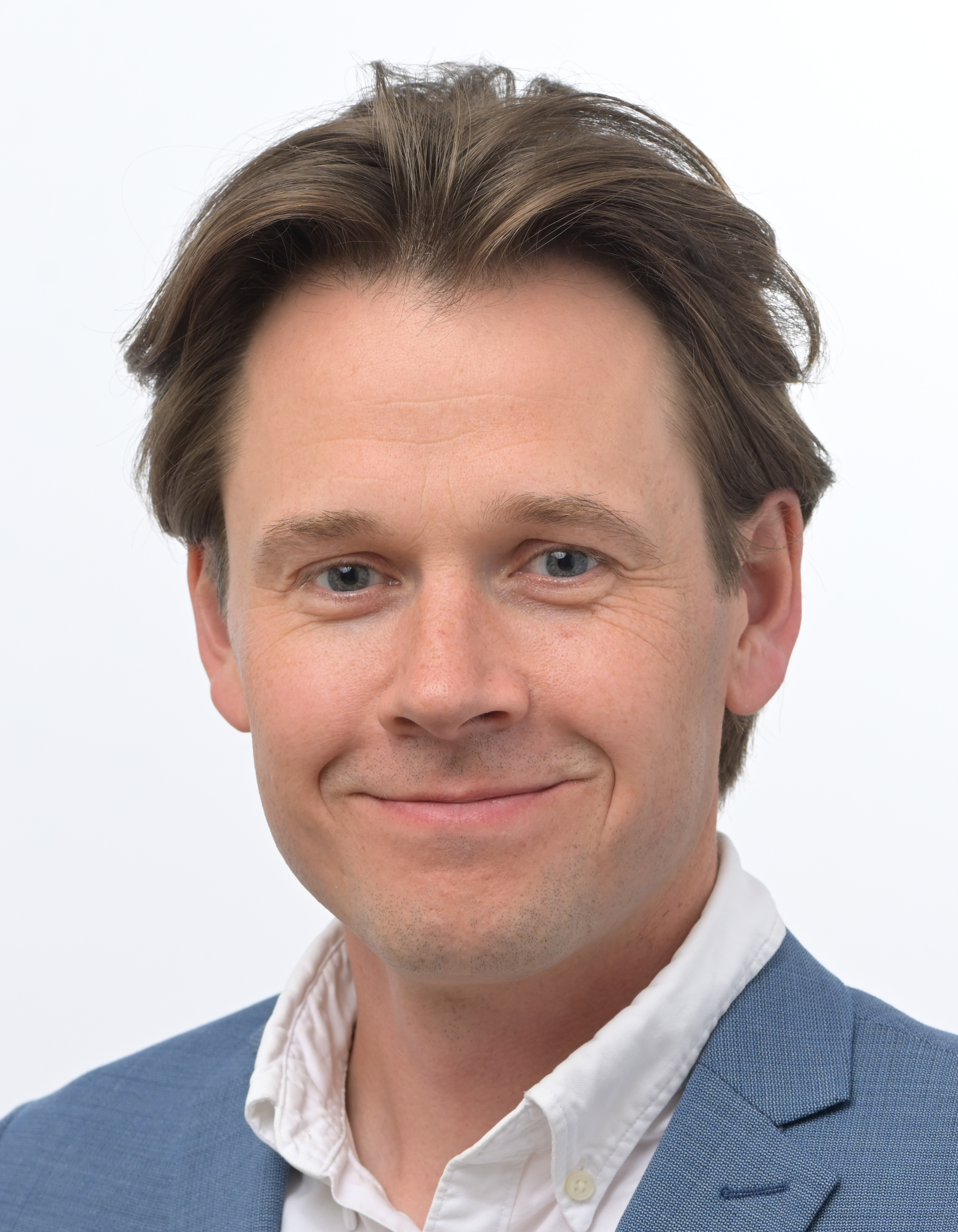

Member of the European Parliament
- Incumbent
- Assumed office 2 July 2019
- Constituency: Denmark

Personal details
- Born: 29 June 1985 (age 41) Copenhagen, Denmark
- Party: Social Democrats
- Education: University of Copenhagen

Niels Fuglsang (born 29 June 1985) is a Danish politician who was elected as a Member of the European Parliament (MEP) in 2019 and again in 2024. A member of the Social Democrats (S), he sits with the Progressive Alliance of Socialists and Democrats (S&D) in the European Parliament.

== Education ==
Fuglsang holds a cand.scient.pol. He completed a ph.d. thesis in economics in 2021.

== Political career ==
Upon joining the European Parliament in July 2019 as part of the Progressive Alliance of Socialists and Democrats group, Fuglsang became a member of the Committee on Employment and Social Affairs and the Committee on Industry, Research and Energy. He left the Committee on Employment and Social Affairs in September 2019.

In addition to his committee assignments, Fuglsang was part of the European Parliament's delegation for relations with the Korean Peninsula until September 2019. He has been part of the European Parliament's delegation for relations with China since he took office. In April 2023, he joined the delegation for relations with the Arab Peninsula, of which he has been vice chair since May 2023. He is also a member of the European Parliament Intergroup on the Welfare and Conservation of Animals.

Fulgsang played a major role in the revision of the Energy Efficiency Directive, adopted in 2023.
