= 2014 European Parliament election in Denmark =

- 25 May 2014
- All 13 Danish seats in the European Parliament
- Turnout: 56.32% (▼3.22 pp)
Party	Leader	Vote %	Seats	+/–
DPP	Morten Messerschmidt	26.61	4	+2
Social Democrats	Jeppe Kofod	19.12	3	−1
Venstre	Ulla Tørnæs	16.68	2	−1
SF	Margrete Auken	10.95	1	−1
Conservatives	Bendt Bendtsen	9.15	1	0
People's Movement	Rina Ronja Kari	8.07	1	0
Social Liberals	Morten Helveg Petersen	6.54	1	+1
This lists parties that won seats. See the complete results below.
Largest party within each Folketing nomination district and constituency.

The 2014 European Parliament election in Denmark was an election held in Denmark on 25 May 2014 to decide who would represent Denmark in the European Parliament (EP) from 2014 to 2019. The Danish People's Party with 26.6% of the votes became the largest party for the first time in a nationwide Danish election.

The election was held alongside the Danish Unified Patent Court membership referendum where 62.5% of the voter approved ratification of the Agreement on a Unified Patent Court.

== Campaign ==
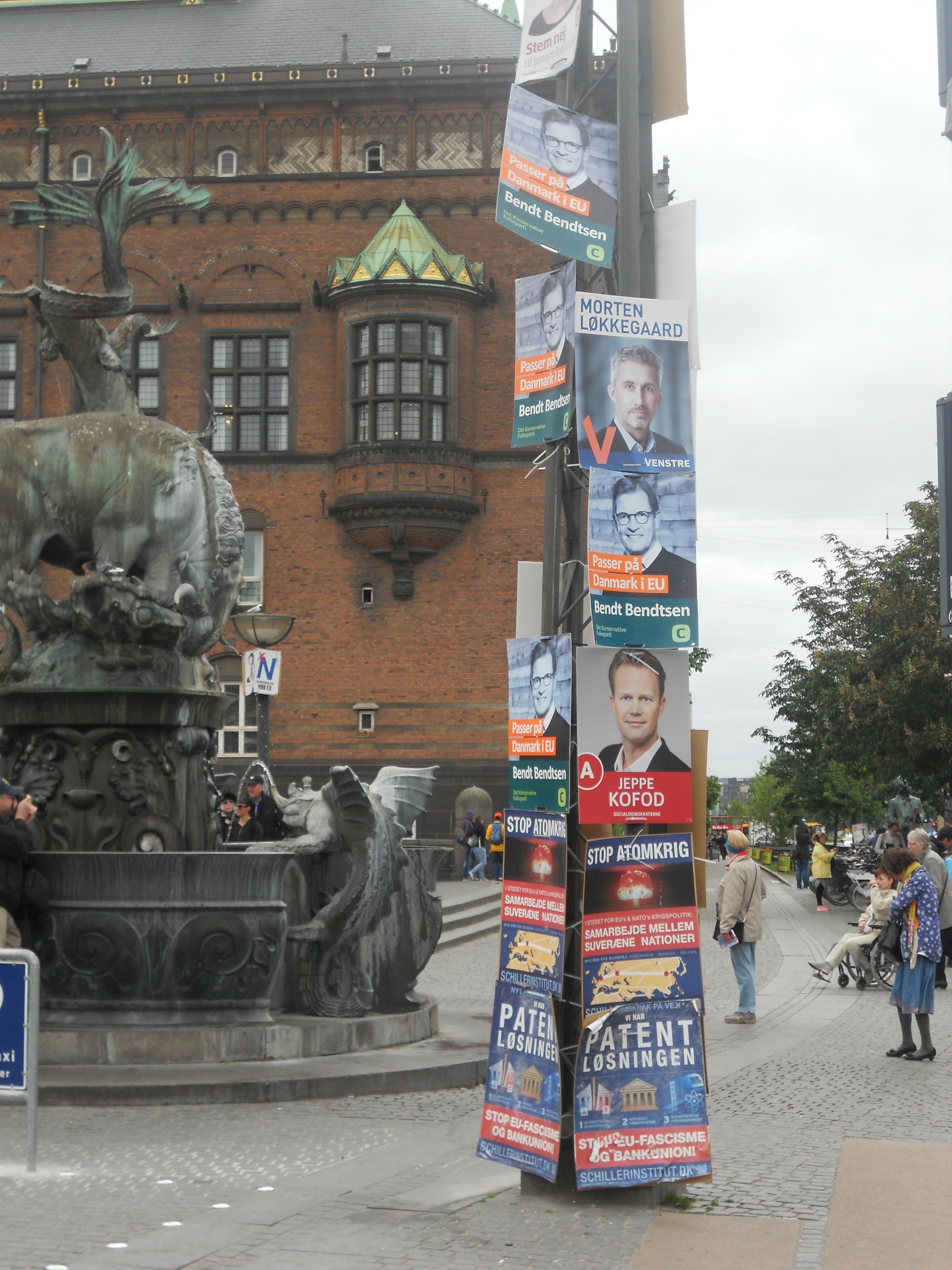
Electoral posters in Copenhagen in May 2014, for the European election. Posters for the Social Democrats, Conservatives, and Venstre appear here. The posters at the bottom relate to the referendum on a Unified Patent Court. On a lamppost in the background of the image, a poster for the People's Movement against the EU is also visible.

All parties in the Folketing except the Red–Green Alliance participated in the election. In addition, the People's Movement against the EU participated. Several parties had incumbent candidates as lead candidates: Bendt Bendtsen for the Conservative People's Party, Margrete Auken for the Socialist People's Party (Denmark) and Morten Messerschmidt for the Danish People's Party. Three of the parties represented in the EP had new lead candidates: Jeppe Kofod for the Social DemocratsUlla Tørnæs for Venstre and Rina Ronja Kari for the People's Movement against the EU. The Danish Social Liberal Party which was not represented in the EP had Morten Helveg Petersen on top of the list while the Liberal Alliance which similarly was not represented had Christina Egelund.

After the Danish People's Party and the Red–Green Alliance opposed Danish membership in the Unified Patent Court, the Danish cabinet in December 2013 decided to hold a referendum on the issue, since joining the court was judicially regarded as transferring sovereignty and would have required five-sixths majority in the parliament to be approved without a referendum.

A central theme in the campaign was the claim of benefit tourism as a threat to the Danish welfare state, a position the Danish People's Party fronted and which was partly supported by Venstre, the Conservatives and the Social Democrats. The Social Liberal Party took the most positive position towards free movement of people inside the EU and was supported by Danish businesses.

On 12 May 2014, Ekstrabladet wrote that Venstre's leader Lars Løkke Rasmussen had received about 150,000 Danish kroner in economic support for clothing in his period as prime minister 2009–2011. Later in the campaign media wrote that Rasmussen and his wife had received a free holiday to Mallorca at the party's expense. The revelations led to a drop in support for Venstre in the polls. Rasmussen later stated the claims were exaggerated.

As part of an effort to motivate young people to take part in the election, the Folketing published a video on YouTube featuring a muscle-bound cartoon figure called "Voteman" who had once failed to vote and later regretted his resulting loss of influence, so he decided to force everyone to vote in elections. He is seen in the video engaging in group sex, and dispensing violence including decapitation, described as "grindhouse"-style by The Guardian's Lars Eriksen. The video was controversial in Denmark and abroad, being criticised for being misogynist and featuring violence while being praised as humorous by others. The Folketing pulled the video a day after its release, with speaker of the Folketing, Mogens Lykketoft, saying the cartoon had been perceived as "more serious and offensive" than intended.

== Results ==
The winner of the election was the Danish People's Party, which for the first time became the largest party in a nationwide election, obtaining 26.61% of the votes and four of the thirteen seats. The party was largest in 71 of 92 electoral districts with a particular strong performance in Lolland and Southern Jutland, while doing less well in the urban areas of Copenhagen and Århus.

The Social Democrats with 19.1% of the votes lost one seat and got three. Their strongest performance was in Eastern Jutland, Bornholm and Copenhagen. The Socialist People's Party which lost one of their two seats had their strongest performance in the same area.

Venstre also lost a seat, getting two seats with 16.7% of the votes, while the Social Liberal Party won back a seat they lost in the previous election.

Voter turnout was 56.4% which was lower than in 2009, but still the second highest ever for a Danish election to the European Parliament.

Morten Messerschmidt from the Danish People's Party got 465,758 preference votes, the highest ever for a Danish politician in an election to the EP.

Party	Votes	%	Seats	+/–
Danish People's Party	605,889	26.61	4	+2
Social Democrats	435,245	19.12	3	−1
Venstre	379,840	16.68	2	−1
Socialist People's Party	249,305	10.95	1	−1
Conservative People's Party	208,262	9.15	1	0
People's Movement against the EU	183,724	8.07	1	0
Danish Social Liberal Party	148,949	6.54	1	+1
Liberal Alliance	65,480	2.88	0	0
Total	2,276,694	100.00	13	0
Valid votes	2,276,694	97.62		
Invalid/blank votes	55,523	2.38		
Total votes	2,332,217	100.00		
Registered voters/turnout	4,141,329	56.32		
Source: Statistics Denmark

=== Seat apportionment ===
Main apportionment
Letter	Electoral alliance/party outside of electoral alliance	Votes	Quotients	Seats
ABF	Social Democrats/Danish Social Liberal Party/Socialist People's Party	831,144	5.54	5
CV	Conservative People's Party/Venstre	586,839	3.91	3
I	Liberal Alliance	65,776	0.44	0
N	People's Movement against the EU	183,493	1.22	1
O	Danish People's Party	605,766	4.04	4
Divisor: 150,000

Alliance 1
Letter	Party	Votes	Quotients	Seats
A	Social Democrats	434,894	3.35	3
B	Danish Social Liberal Party	148,006	1.14	1
F	Socialist People's Party	248,244	1.91	1
Divisor: 130,000

Alliance 2
Letter	Party	Votes	Quotients	Seats
C	Conservative People's Party	208,067	1.30	1
V	Venstre	378,772	2.37	2
Divisor: 160,000

=== Elected MEPs ===
The seats were given out within the parties to the candidates who received the preference votes.

Danish People's Party
1. Morten Messerschmidt – 465,758 votes
2. Rikke Karlsson – 9,205 votes
3. Anders Primdahl Vistisen – 8,315 votes
4. Jørn Dohrmann – 6,439 votes

Social Democrats
1. Jeppe Kofod – 170,739 votes
2. Christel Schaldemose – 64,495 votes
3. Ole Christensen – 26,855 votes

Venstre
1. Ulla Tørnæs – 136,388 votes
2. Jens Rohde – 48,911 votes

Socialist People's Party
1. Margrete Auken – 153,072 votes

Conservative People's Party
1. Bendt Bendtsen – 151,274 votes

People's Movement Against the EU
1. Rina Ronja Kari – 63,673 votes

Social Liberal Party
1. Morten Helveg Petersen – 76,390 votes

== Reactions and aftermath ==
With about one third of the votes for Eurosceptic parties, the election was regarded by political commentators as strengthening this position, with a possibility that also the Europositive parties would become more critical to certain EU policies, such as sending welfare checks abroad. The support in the referendum of Denmark being part of Unified Patent Court was on the other side seen as evidence that a majority of Danes still favoured giving the EU more influence in certain areas.

Political commentators saw the good result for the Danish People's Party as also reflecting that the party since Kristian Thulesen Dahl became leader in 2012 has become less controversial and has put more focus on welfare issues. At the same time, some of the votes for the party were considered to be protest votes in relation to EU matters and not believed to transfer into votes for the party in the next Danish general election.

The Social Liberal Party was regarded as another winner, winning a seat which they lost in the prior election.

The result was also seen as positive for the Socialist People's Party and the Conservative People's Party which polled low at the start of the campaign but managed to keep their respective seats.

The bad result for Venstre was seen as partly a result of the debate over Lars Røkke Rasmussen's clothing and holiday expenses and led to a discussion in the party about his positions with several local party groups and individual politicians requesting that he resigned. After a special meeting on 3 June, the party concluded that he still had the party's trust and would continue as party leader and candidate for prime minister.

Internationally the election result was seen as part of a wider trend of electoral gain for eurosceptic and far right parties in the election.

On 4 June, the Danish People's Party was admitted into the European Conservatives and Reformists group in the EP, thus leaving the Europe of Freedom and Democracy group.
