= Kristoffer Storm =

Danish politician (born 1989)

Kristoffer Hjort Storm
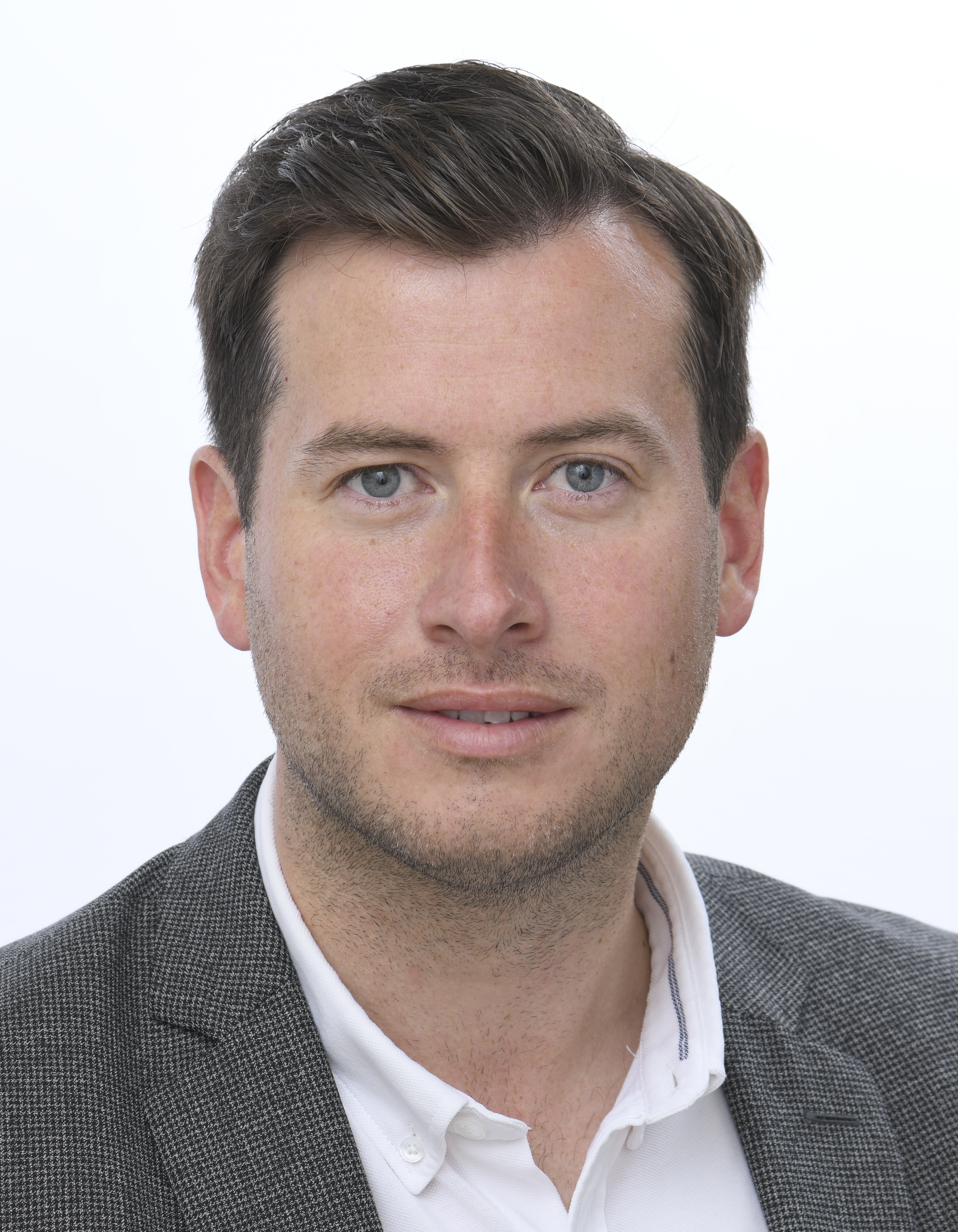
- Official portrait, 2024

Member of the European Parliament for Denmark
- Incumbent
- Assumed office 16 July 2024

Member of the Aalborg City Council
- In office 1 January 2016 – 15 July 2024

Member of the North Jutland Region Regional Council
- In office 19 November 2013 – 15 July 2024

Personal details
- Born: Kristoffer Hjort Storm; 26 January 1989 (age 37) Hillerød, Denmark
- Party: Denmark Democrats (2023–present)
- Other political affiliations: Danish People's Party (2010–2022)
- Children: 4
- Education: Aalborg University

Kristoffer Hjort Storm (born 26 January 1989) is a Danish politician from the Denmark Democrats, who was elected a Member of the European Parliament in the 2024 European Parliament election. He was also a member of the Aalborg city council from 2021 to 2024.

== See also ==
- List of members of the European Parliament (2024–2029)
