= Kasper Møller Hansen =

Danish political scientist

Kasper Møller Hansen (born 28 June 1973 in Aarhus) is a Danish political scientist and professor with the Department of Political Science at the University of Copenhagen. He specialises in attitude formation, voter behaviour and voter turnout.
