= Rina Ronja Kari =

Danish politician

Rina Ronja Kari MEP
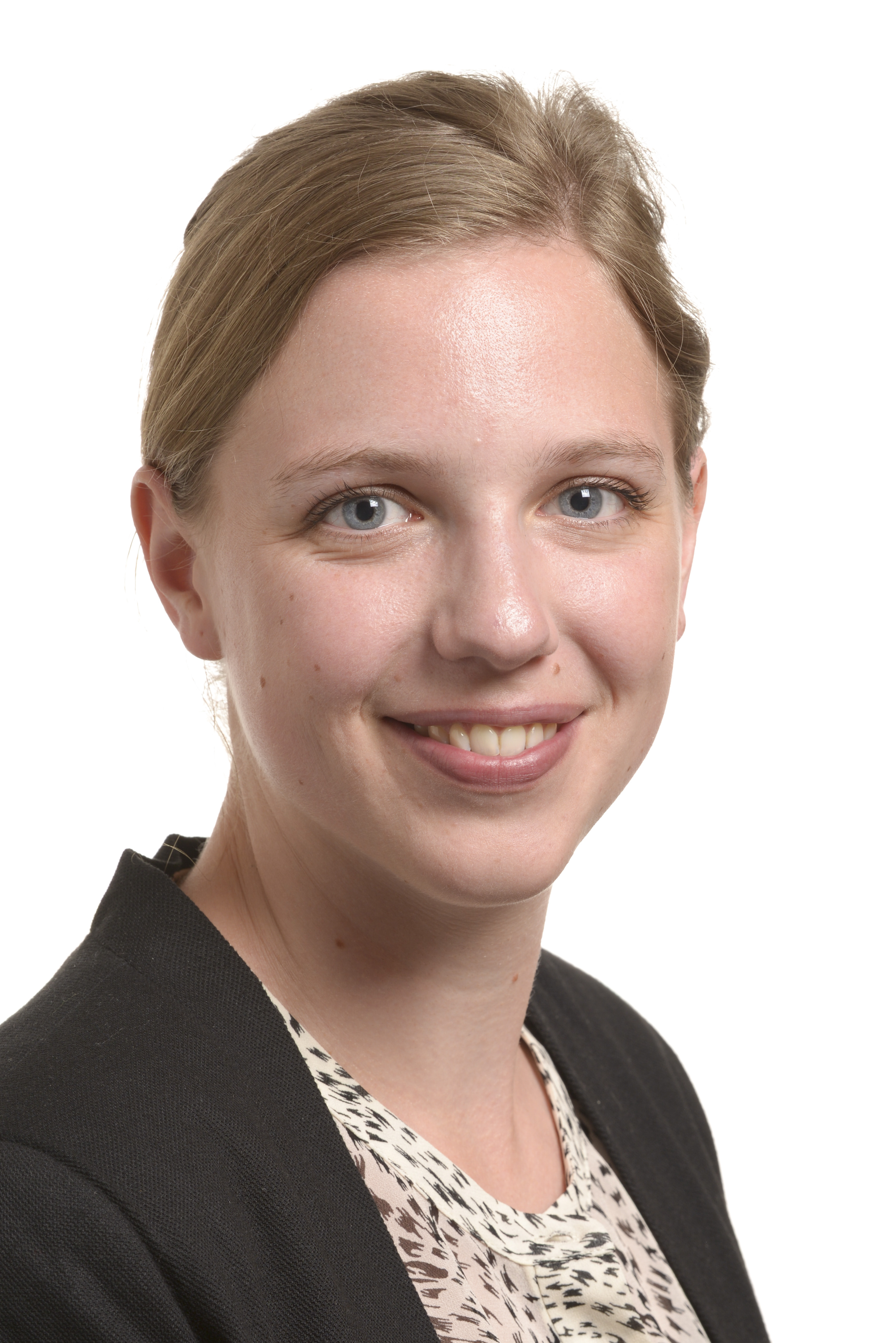

Member of the European Parliament
- In office 1 July 2014 – 30 June 2019
- Constituency: Denmark

Personal details
- Born: Rina Ronja Kari; 15 February 1985 (age 41) Copenhagen, Denmark
- Party: Danish; People's Movement against the EU; EU; European United Left–Nordic Green Left
- Spouse: Christian Bierlich
- Website: www.rinaronja.dk

Rina Ronja Kari (born 15 February 1985) is a Danish politician and was a Member of the European Parliament (MEP) from Denmark. She is a member of the People's Movement against the EU, part of the European United Left–Nordic Green Left.

She replaced Søren Søndergaard as MEP for the People's Movement against the EU and is associated member of GUE/NGL. She was elected to the European Parliament in May 2014, and lost her seat in May 2019.
