= Anne Sophie Callesen =

Danish politician (born 1988)

Member of the Folketing
- Incumbent
- Assumed office 5 June 2019
- Constituency: East Jutland

Personal details
- Born: 25 December 1988 (age 37) Aarhus, Denmark
- Party: Social Liberal Party

Anne Sophie Callesen (born 25 December 1988 in Aarhus) is a Danish politician, who is a member of the Folketing for the Social Liberal Party. She was elected into the Folketing in the 2019 Danish general election.

== Political career ==
Callesen was elected into the Folketing at the 2019 election, receiving 1,926 votes.
