= Christel Schaldemose =

Danish politician (born 1967)

Christel Schaldemose MEP
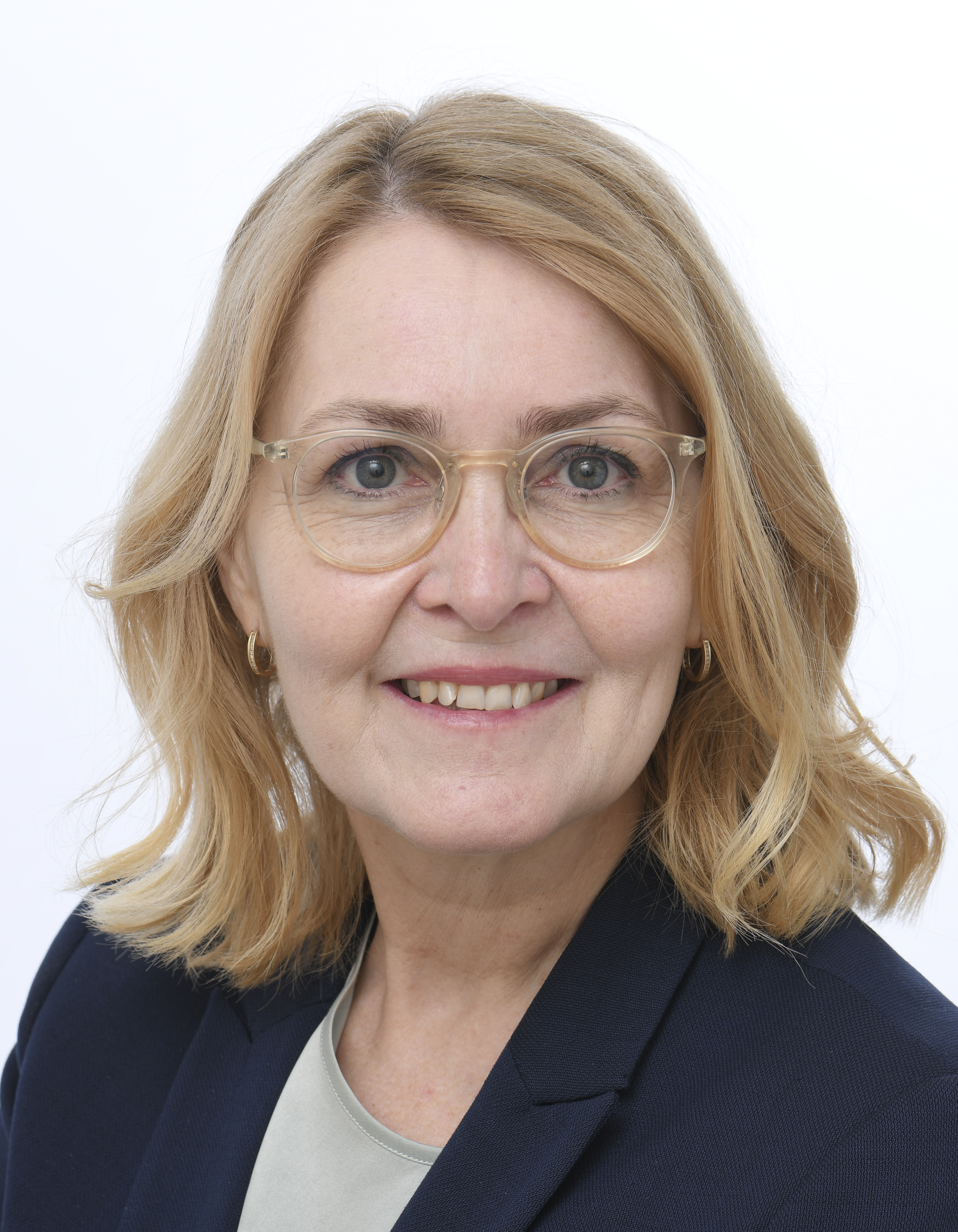
- Official portrait, 2024

Member of the European Parliament
- Incumbent
- Assumed office 1 July 2006
- Constituency: Denmark

Personal details
- Born: 4 August 1967 (age 59) Odense, Denmark
- Party: Danish: Social Democrats; EU: Party of European Socialists
- Spouse: Ib Lindstrøm
- Children: 3
- Education: University of Southern Denmark
- Website: www.christels.dk

Christel Schaldemose (born 4 August 1967) is a Danish politician who has been serving as a Member of the European Parliament since 2006. She is a member of the Social Democrats, part of the Party of European Socialists.

In parliament, Schaldemose is a member of the Committee on Internal Market and Consumer Protection (IMCO). Since 2024, Schaldemose has been a Vice President of the European Parliament.

== Early life and career ==
Schaldemose was born in Odense. She has a masters in history from the University of Southern Denmark. She has worked professionally with adult education and popular enlightenment on national and regional level. Her previous job was secretary general of the Danish Adult Education Council.

== Member of the European Parliament ==
Schaldemose has been a Member of the European Parliament since 2006. She has since been serving on the Committee on the Internal Market and Consumer Protection, where she is the S&D group’s coordinator. In this capacity, she works on consumer and internal market policy. From 2016 until 2017, she was also part of the Committee of Inquiry into Emission Measurements in the Automotive Sector. In 2021, she was appointed as the parliament's rapporteur on the Digital Services Act (DSA).

In addition to her committee assignments, Schadelmose has been a member of the Parliament's delegation for relations with Japan since 2009. She is also a member of the MEP Heart Group (sponsored by the European Heart Network (EHN) and the European Society of Cardiology (ESC)), a group of parliamentarians who have an interest in promoting measures that will help reduce the burden of cardiovascular diseases (CVD); the European Parliament Intergroup on LGBT Rights; and the European Parliament Intergroup on the Welfare and Conservation of Animals.

On 4 May 2008, Schaldemose launched the citizen's initiative "Females in Front" with MEPs from other EU countries. The campaign demands that at least one woman is appointed to one of the four top positions in the EU to be filled in 2009. She also led an initiative requiring all consumer products to indicate their country of origin (products made in the EU could indicate “Made in the EU” instead).

In September 2022, Schaldemose was the recipient of the Consumer Rights Award at The Parliament Magazine's annual MEP Awards

== Personal life ==
Schaldemose lives in Copenhagen with her husband and three children (born 1996 to 2003).
