= European Parliament Intergroup on LGBT Rights =

LGBTQ Activist group of EU legislators

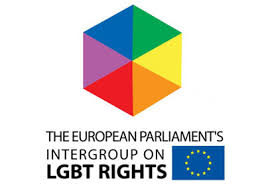
Symbol of the European Parliament’s intergroup on LGBT rights

The European Parliament Intergroup on LGBTI Rights is an intergroup of the European Parliament's legislators which focuses on the rights of lesbian, gay, bisexual, transgender and intersex (LGBTI) persons both inside and outside the European Union. It is a cross-party group of Members of the European Parliament counting over 150 supporters from five political groups and all EU countries. The LGBTI Intergroup remains the largest in the 2019 to 2024 legislature.

The Intergroup collaborates with EU institutions (European Commission, Council of the European Union, EEAS, European Committee of the Regions, Fundamental Rights Agency), Permanent Representations of Member States, other European International Organisations (e.g. Council of Europe, United Nations) and civil society associations (LGBTI-specific associations such as ILGA-Europe, IGLYO, Transgender Europe, NELFA, or with broader human rights focuses like Front Line Defenders, Civil Rights Defenders and Amnesty International).

== Political priorities ==
The priorities are as follows:

1. Freedom of movement for LGBTI people
2. Monitoring the European Commission
3. Combating discrimination in the European Union
4. Securing transgender and intersex rights
5. Monitoring human rights in the work of the European Union

Both Co-Presidents and Vice-Presidents decide upon the Intergroup's work programme and priorities.

== Membership ==
=== Presidency ===
The Bureau of the Intergroup is composed of 6 Members:

- Marc Angel (Progressive Alliance of Socialists and Democrats), Co-President;
- Kim van Sparrentak (Greens-EFA), Co-President;
- Dainius Žalimas (Renew Europe), Vice-President;
- Carolina Morace (The Left), Vice-President;
- Lukas Sieper (Renew Europe), Vice-President.

The Co-Presidents lead the Intergroup and represent it both inside and outside of the European Parliament, taking urgent decisions when necessary.

Previous presidents and vice-presidents of the intergroup include: Terry Reintke (Greens-EFA), Liesje Schreinemacher (Renew Europe), Sophie in 't Veld (Renew Europe), Tanja Fajon (S&D), Sirpa Pietikäinen (EPP), Ulrike Lunacek (Greens-EFA), Daniele Viotti (S&D), Michael Cashman (S&D), Ulrike Lunacek (Greens-EFA), Ian Duncan (ECR), Malin Björk (The Left), and Maria Walsh (EPP).

=== Full members ===
As of April 2026 (in the tenth European Parliament), the Intergroup's membership consists of 109 members, including the aforementioned.

By political group:

- 31 of the Progressive Alliance of Socialists and Democrats (S&D)
- 29 of The Greens–European Free Alliance (Greens–EFA)
- 21 of the Renew Europe Group (RE)
- 17 of The Left in the European Parliament (LEFT)
- 9 of the European People's Party Group (EPP)
- 2 non-attached members.

== Secretary ==
The current secretary is Miguel Chambel since March 2020.

Previous secretaries include:

- Juliette Sanchez-Lambert (February 2018 – January 2020)
- Evert Jacobsen (June 2014 – February 2018)
- Bruno Selun (November 2009 – June 2014)
- Maris Sergejenko (April 2008 – June 2009)
- Kim Smouter (September 2006 – March 2008)
- Catrine Norrgård (December 2005 – June 2006)
- Oscar Ortiz-Nieminen (September 2005 – March 2006)

== See also ==
- LGBT rights in the European Union
- LGBT rights in Europe
- List of LGBT rights organisations
