= List of members of the European Parliament for Denmark, 1984–1989 =

Members of the European Parliament for Denmark
Delegation	(1973)
1st term	(1979)
2nd term	(1984)
3rd term	(1989)
4th term	(1994)
5th term	(1999)
6th term	(2004)
7th term	(2009)
8th term	(2014)
9th term	(2019)
10th term	(2024)

This is the list of the 16 members of the European Parliament for Denmark in the 1984 to 1989 session.

== List ==
Representative	National party	EP Group	Votes
Jens-Peter Bonde	People's Movement against the EEC	RBW	16,733
Bodil Boserup	Socialist People's Party	COM	42,395
Jørgen Bøgh (Note: Retired in 1987. Replaced by Birgit Bjørnvig on 1 September 1987.)	People's Movement against the EEC	RBW	18,470
Ib Christensen	People's Movement against the EEC	RBW	21,898
Ejner Hovgård Christiansen	Social Democrats	SOC	15,618
Ove Fich	Social Democrats	SOC	35,160
Eva Gredal	Social Democrats	SOC	57,303
Else Hammerich	People's Movement against the EEC	RBW	156,145
Erhard Jakobsen	Centre Democrats	EPP	116,664
Marie Jepsen	Conservative People's Party	ED	7,211
Finn Lynge (Note: Resigned in 1984 because Greenland lost its seat in the Parliament. Replaced by John Iversen ( Socialist People's Party) on 1 January 1985.)	Forward	SOC	–
Poul Møller (Note: Resigned in 1986. Replaced by Larson Poulsen on 13 October 1986.)	Conservative People's Party	ED	134,069
Jørgen Nielsen	Left, Liberal Party	LD	20,823
Tove Nielsen	Left, Liberal Party	LD	66,419
Jeanette Oppenheim	Conservative People's Party	ED	8,572
Claus Toksvig (Note: Died in 1988. Replaced by Frode Kristoffersen on 6 November 1988.)	Conservative People's Party	ED	130,728
