= List of members of the European Parliament for Denmark, 1994–1999 =

Members of the European Parliament for Denmark
Delegation	(1973)
1st term	(1979)
2nd term	(1984)
3rd term	(1989)
4th term	(1994)
5th term	(1999)
6th term	(2004)
7th term	(2009)
8th term	(2014)
9th term	(2019)
10th term	(2024)

This is the list of the 16 elected members of the European Parliament for Denmark in the 1994 to 1999 session.

== List ==
Name	National party	EP Group	Votes
Freddy Blak	Social Democrats	PES	52,402
Jens-Peter Bonde	June Movement	EN (until 10 November 1996) NI (12 January 1997) I–EN	104,299
Lone Dybkjær	Social Liberal Party	ELDR	159,552
Lilli Gyldenkilde (until 14 January 1996) John Iversen (from 15 January 1996)	Socialist People's Party Social Democrats	G (until 20 December 1994) EUL (until 5 January 1995) EUL–NGL (until 30 September 1996) PES	119,449
Bertel Haarder	Left, Liberal Party	ELDR	88,093
Eva Hansen	Left, Liberal Party	ELDR	123,003
Kirsten Jensen	Social Democrats	PES	115,449
Lis Jensen	People's Movement against the EU	EN (until 10 November 1996) NI (12 January 1997) I–EN	13,026
Niels Anker Kofoed	Left, Liberal Party	ELDR	22,138
Ole Krarup	People's Movement against the EU	EN (until 10 November 1996) NI (12 January 1997) I–EN	90,030
Frode Kristoffersen	Conservative People's Party	EPP	26,473
Karin Riis-Jørgensen	Left, Liberal Party	ELDR	19,772
Christian Rovsing	Conservative People's Party	EPP	33,197
Ulla Sandbæk	June Movement	EN (until 10 November 1996) NI (12 January 1997) I–EN	26,371
Poul Schlüter	Conservative People's Party	EPP	247,956
Niels Sindal	Social Democrats	PES	13,021
