= List of members of the European Parliament for Denmark, 1989–1994 =

Members of the European Parliament for Denmark
Delegation	(1973)
1st term	(1979)
2nd term	(1984)
3rd term	(1989)
4th term	(1994)
5th term	(1999)
6th term	(2004)
7th term	(2009)
8th term	(2014)
9th term	(2019)
10th term	(2024)

This is a list of the 16 members of the European Parliament for Denmark in the 1989 to 1994 session.

== List ==
Name	National party	EP Group	Votes
Freddy Blak	Social Democrats	SOC	16,700
Jens-Peter Bonde	People's Movement against the EU (31 December 1992) June Movement	RBW	68,979
Birgit Bjørnvig	People's Movement against the EU (31 December 1992) June Movement	RBW	31,786
Frode Christensen	Centre Democrats	EPP	4,596
Ib Christensen	People's Movement against the EU	RBW	39,607
Ejner Christiansen	Social Democrats (until 16 December 1992) Independent	SOC (until 16 December 1992) NI	26,583
John Iversen	Socialist People's Party	EUL	22,738
Erhard Jakobsen (until 28 February 1994) Arne Melchior (from 1 March 1994)	Centre Democrats	EPP	116,875
Kirsten Jensen	Social Democrats	SOC	108,974
Marie Jepsen	Conservative People's Party	ED (until 30 April 1992) EPP	46,632
Niels Kofoed	Left, Liberal Party	LDR	81,133
Tove Nielsen	Left, Liberal Party	LDR	35,234
Klaus Riskær Pedersen	Left, Liberal Party (until 5 December 1993) Independent	LDR (until 5 December 1993) NI	57,114
Christian Rovsing	Conservative People's Party	ED (until 30 April 1992) EPP	22,132
Joanna Rønn	Social Democrats	SOC	18,967
Ulla Sandbæk	People's Movement against the EU (31 December 1992) June Movement	RBW	15,561

== Sources ==
- List of Danish MEPs (in Danish)
