= List of members of the European Parliament for Denmark, 1979–1984 =

Members of the European Parliament for Denmark
Delegation	(1973)
1st term	(1979)
2nd term	(1984)
3rd term	(1989)
4th term	(1994)
5th term	(1999)
6th term	(2004)
7th term	(2009)
8th term	(2014)
9th term	(2019)
10th term	(2024)

This is the list of the 16 members of the European Parliament for Denmark in the 1979 to 1984 session.

== List ==
Name	National party	EP Group	Votes
Jørgen Bøgh	People's Movement against the EEC	TGI	26,362
Jens-Peter Bonde	People's Movement against the EEC	TGI	12,048
Bodil Boserup	Socialist People's Party	COM	16,036
Eva Gredal	Social Democrats	SOC	16,329
Mette Groes (until 18 September 1980) Eggert Petersen (from 9 October 1980)	Social Democrats	SOC	24,990
Niels Haagerup	Left, Liberal Party	LDR	28,392
Else Hammerich	People's Movement against the EEC	TGI	78,164
Erhard Jakobsen	Centre Democrats	ED (until 30 September 1980) NI (until 9 February 1981) EPP	116,664
Kent Kirk	Conservative People's Party	ED	11,522
Finn Lynge	Forward	SOC	–
Poul Møller	Conservative People's Party	ED	153,227
Jørgen Nielsen	Left, Liberal Party	LDR	21,076
Tove Nielsen	Left, Liberal Party	LDR	38,224
Kai Nyborg	Progress Party (until 23 October 1983) Conservative People's Party	EPD	45,048
Kjeld Olesen (until 31 October 1979) Ove Fich (from 7 November 1979)	Social Democrats	SOC	150,291
Sven Skovmand	People's Movement against the EEC	TGI	17,250

== Sources ==
- List of Danish MEPs (in Danish)
