= List of members of the European Parliament for Denmark, 2019–2024 =

Members of the European Parliament for Denmark
Delegation	(1973)
1st term	(1979)
2nd term	(1984)
3rd term	(1989)
4th term	(1994)
5th term	(1999)
6th term	(2004)
7th term	(2009)
8th term	(2014)
9th term	(2019)
10th term	(2024)

On 26 May 2019 Denmark elected 14 members of the European Parliament. Of these, the 14th member is due to join the parliament when United Kingdom leaves the European Union. Linea Søgaard-Lidell was the 14th member. The 14 members elected were:

Name	Party	Number of personal votes
Morten Løkkegaard	Venstre	207,588
Søren Gade	Venstre	201,696
Asger Christensen	Venstre	31,347
Linea Søgaard-Lidell	Venstre	24,153
Marianne Vind	Socialdemokratiet	
Christel Schaldemose	Socialdemokratiet	65,179
Niels Fuglsang	Socialdemokratiet	29,444
Karsten Hønge‡	Socialistisk Folkeparti	19,687
Margrete Auken	Socialistisk Folkeparti	199,522
Morten Helveg Petersen	Radikale Venstre	97,667
Karen Melchior	Radikale Venstre	17,292
Peter Kofod	Dansk Folkeparti	119,408
Pernille Weiss	Konservative Folkeparti	80,140
Nikolaj Villumsen	Enhedslisten	50,567

‡Karsten Hønge later chose not to take his seat, which was later taken by Kira Marie Peter-Hansen (Socialistisk Folkeparti) with 15,765 personal votes. Marianne Vind replaced Jeppe Kofod, who received 188,757 personal votes.

== Members who joined later ==
- Linea Søgaard-Lidell (2020)
- Bergur Løkke Rasmussen (2022)
- Erik Poulsen (2022)
- Anders Vistisen (2022)
