= Ringkøbing (nomination district) =

- Ringkøbing
- Nomination district constituency for the Folketing
- Location of Ringkøbing within West Jutland

- Location of West Jutland within Denmark
- Municipalities: Ringkøbing-Skjern
- Constituency: West Jutland
- Electorate: 40,312 (2022)

Current constituency
- Created: 1849 (as constituency); 1920 (as nomination district)

Ringkøbing nominating district is one of the 92 nominating districts that was created for Danish elections following the 2007 municipal reform. It consists of Ringkøbing-Skjern municipality. It was created in 1849 as a constituency, and has been a nomination district since 1920, though its boundaries have been changed since then.

In general elections, the district is a very strong area for parties commonly associated with the blue bloc, and in the 2022 election, it became the district where they received their highest vote share.

== General elections results ==
=== General elections in the 2020s ===
2022 Danish general election

Parties	Vote		
Parties	Votes	%	+ / -
Venstre	8,492	24.95	-6.67
Social Democrats	7,095	20.85	+1.43
Denmark Democrats	5,681	16.69	New
Liberal Alliance	2,404	7.06	+5.26
Moderates	2,178	6.40	New
Conservatives	2,140	6.29	+0.28
Green Left	1,578	4.64	+0.02
Christian Democrats	1,421	4.18	-12.20
New Right	1,205	3.54	+1.98
Danish People's Party	615	1.81	-8.04
Red–Green Alliance	452	1.33	-0.88
Social Liberals	385	1.13	-2.38
The Alternative	320	0.94	-0.21
Independent Greens	40	0.12	New
Karen Predbjørn Klarbæk	27	0.08	New
Total	34,033		

=== General elections in the 2010s ===
2019 Danish general election

Parties	Vote		
Parties	Votes	%	+ / -
Venstre	10,858	31.62	-3.05
Social Democrats	6,668	19.42	+0.22
Christian Democrats	5,624	16.38	+9.89
Danish People's Party	3,383	9.85	-12.60
Conservatives	2,063	6.01	+2.96
Green Left	1,586	4.62	+1.79
Social Liberals	1,207	3.51	+1.60
Red–Green Alliance	758	2.21	-0.93
Liberal Alliance	619	1.80	-2.78
New Right	536	1.56	New
Stram Kurs	477	1.39	New
The Alternative	396	1.15	-0.53
Klaus Riskær Pedersen Party	167	0.49	New
Total	34,342		

2015 Danish general election

Parties	Vote		
Parties	Votes	%	+ / -
Venstre	12,330	34.67	-6.58
Danish People's Party	7,985	22.45	+9.10
Social Democrats	6,830	19.20	+1.75
Christian Democrats	2,309	6.49	+1.36
Liberal Alliance	1,628	4.58	+0.24
Red–Green Alliance	1,118	3.14	+0.86
Conservatives	1,085	3.05	-0.29
Green Left	1,006	2.83	-4.31
Social Liberals	681	1.91	-3.76
The Alternative	596	1.68	New
Erik Sputnik	0	0.00	New
Total	35,568		

2011 Danish general election

Parties	Vote		
Parties	Votes	%	+ / -
Venstre	15,143	41.25	-0.21
Social Democrats	6,406	17.45	+0.27
Danish People's Party	4,900	13.35	-0.22
Green Left	2,622	7.14	-0.71
Social Liberals	2,081	5.67	+2.31
Christian Democrats	1,883	5.13	-1.36
Liberal Alliance	1,592	4.34	+2.46
Conservatives	1,226	3.34	-4.32
Red–Green Alliance	837	2.28	+1.76
Rikke Cramer Christiansen	13	0.04	New
Ejgil Kølbæk	3	0.01	-0.01
Total	36,706		

=== General elections in the 2000s ===
2007 Danish general election

Parties	Vote		
Parties	Votes	%	+ / -
Venstre	15,089	41.46	-1.52
Social Democrats	6,254	17.18	-0.70
Danish People's Party	4,939	13.57	+1.00
Green Left	2,858	7.85	+1.72
Conservatives	2,789	7.66	+0.84
Christian Democrats	2,363	6.49	+1.23
Social Liberals	1,222	3.36	-2.46
New Alliance	683	1.88	New
Red–Green Alliance	190	0.52	-0.95
Ejgil Kølbæk	8	0.02	0.00
Total	36,395		

2005 Danish general election

Parties	Vote		
Parties	Votes	%	+ / -
Venstre	16,658	42.98	-1.58
Social Democrats	6,931	17.88	-3.47
Danish People's Party	4,871	12.57	+1.47
Conservatives	2,644	6.82	+1.10
Green Left	2,377	6.13	+0.63
Social Liberals	2,255	5.82	+2.35
Christian Democrats	2,039	5.26	-0.39
Red–Green Alliance	568	1.47	+0.78
Centre Democrats	362	0.93	-0.38
Minority Party	47	0.12	New
Ejgil Kølbæk	9	0.02	New
Total	38,761		

2001 Danish general election

Parties	Vote		
Parties	Votes	%	+ / -
Venstre	17,932	44.56	+7.33
Social Democrats	8,590	21.35	-4.55
Danish People's Party	4,468	11.10	+4.02
Conservatives	2,301	5.72	-0.54
Christian People's Party	2,273	5.65	-1.67
Green Left	2,214	5.50	-0.90
Social Liberals	1,395	3.47	+0.60
Centre Democrats	529	1.31	-2.42
Red–Green Alliance	279	0.69	-0.14
Progress Party	260	0.65	-1.39
Total	40,241		

=== General elections in the 1990s ===
1998 Danish general election

Parties	Vote		
Parties	Votes	%	+ / -
Venstre	15,002	37.23	-1.58
Social Democrats	10,435	25.90	+1.52
Christian People's Party	2,949	7.32	+2.29
Danish People's Party	2,853	7.08	New
Green Left	2,579	6.40	+0.38
Conservatives	2,521	6.26	-5.72
Centre Democrats	1,503	3.73	+1.63
Social Liberals	1,157	2.87	-0.07
Progress Party	820	2.04	-5.77
Red–Green Alliance	333	0.83	-0.11
Democratic Renewal	140	0.35	New
Total	40,292		

1994 Danish general election

Parties	Vote		
Parties	Votes	%	+ / -
Venstre	15,541	38.81	+10.00
Social Democrats	9,763	24.38	+0.06
Conservatives	4,796	11.98	-1.84
Progress Party	3,126	7.81	-2.18
Green Left	2,410	6.02	+0.34
Christian People's Party	2,014	5.03	-1.92
Social Liberals	1,179	2.94	+0.18
Centre Democrats	840	2.10	-3.25
Red–Green Alliance	377	0.94	+0.50
Total	40,046		

1990 Danish general election

Parties	Vote		
Parties	Votes	%	+ / -
Venstre	11,142	28.81	+2.14
Social Democrats	9,403	24.32	+4.43
Conservatives	5,346	13.82	-2.39
Progress Party	3,862	9.99	-2.29
Christian People's Party	2,689	6.95	+0.58
Green Left	2,197	5.68	+0.25
Centre Democrats	2,068	5.35	-1.34
Social Liberals	1,066	2.76	-1.24
Common Course	391	1.01	-0.17
Red–Green Alliance	171	0.44	New
The Greens	169	0.44	-0.38
Justice Party of Denmark	167	0.43	New
Total	38,671		

=== General elections in the 1980s ===
1988 Danish general election

Parties	Vote		
Parties	Votes	%	+ / -
Venstre	10,609	26.67	+0.65
Social Democrats	7,915	19.89	-1.14
Conservatives	6,449	16.21	-2.20
Progress Party	4,884	12.28	+6.08
Centre Democrats	2,663	6.69	-0.22
Christian People's Party	2,534	6.37	-0.87
Green Left	2,161	5.43	-0.83
Social Liberals	1,592	4.00	-0.28
Common Course	470	1.18	-0.14
The Greens	328	0.82	+0.05
Communist Party of Denmark	85	0.21	+0.19
Left Socialists	77	0.19	-0.26
Kaj Ove Sørensen	17	0.04	New
Total	39,784		

1987 Danish general election

Parties	Vote		
Parties	Votes	%	+ / -
Venstre	10,479	26.02	-1.08
Social Democrats	8,470	21.03	+1.50
Conservatives	7,414	18.41	-4.05
Christian People's Party	2,916	7.24	-1.09
Centre Democrats	2,785	6.91	+1.00
Green Left	2,521	6.26	+1.56
Progress Party	2,496	6.20	+0.38
Social Liberals	1,722	4.28	+0.30
Common Course	533	1.32	New
The Greens	309	0.77	New
Justice Party of Denmark	190	0.47	-0.60
Left Socialists	181	0.45	-0.45
Socialist Workers Party	105	0.26	+0.24
Erik Haaest	72	0.18	New
Humanist Party	60	0.15	New
Communist Party of Denmark	10	0.02	-0.14
Marxist–Leninists Party	10	0.02	+0.01
Ian Jordan	3	0.01	New
Total	40,276		

1984 Danish general election

Parties	Vote		
Parties	Votes	%	+ / -
Venstre	10,979	27.10	+1.75
Conservatives	9,100	22.46	+10.40
Social Democrats	7,910	19.53	-1.61
Christian People's Party	3,373	8.33	+1.49
Centre Democrats	2,396	5.91	-3.19
Progress Party	2,358	5.82	-8.88
Green Left	1,902	4.70	-0.19
Social Liberals	1,613	3.98	+0.20
Justice Party of Denmark	434	1.07	-0.06
Left Socialists	364	0.90	+0.19
Communist Party of Denmark	64	0.16	-0.07
Socialist Workers Party	10	0.02	0.00
Marxist–Leninists Party	6	0.01	New
Total	40,509		

1981 Danish general election

Parties	Vote		
Parties	Votes	%	+ / -
Venstre	9,458	25.35	-1.94
Social Democrats	7,889	21.14	-2.99
Progress Party	5,487	14.70	-1.81
Conservatives	4,502	12.06	+1.88
Centre Democrats	3,395	9.10	+5.45
Christian People's Party	2,552	6.84	-0.21
Green Left	1,826	4.89	+2.22
Social Liberals	1,412	3.78	-0.58
Justice Party of Denmark	420	1.13	-0.90
Left Socialists	264	0.71	-0.64
Communist Party of Denmark	84	0.23	-0.34
Communist Workers Party	19	0.05	-0.15
Socialist Workers Party	7	0.02	New
Total	37,315		

=== General elections in the 1970s ===
1979 Danish general election

Parties	Vote		
Parties	Votes	%	+ / -
Venstre	10,329	27.29	-0.61
Social Democrats	9,132	24.13	+2.74
Progress Party	6,250	16.51	-4.20
Conservatives	3,851	10.18	+3.91
Christian People's Party	2,670	7.05	-1.18
Social Liberals	1,651	4.36	+1.15
Centre Democrats	1,383	3.65	-2.01
Green Left	1,012	2.67	+1.00
Justice Party of Denmark	769	2.03	-0.54
Left Socialists	511	1.35	+0.56
Communist Party of Denmark	215	0.57	-0.45
Communist Workers Party	74	0.20	New
Total	37,847		

1977 Danish general election

Parties	Vote		
Parties	Votes	%	+ / -
Venstre	9,944	27.90	-13.19
Social Democrats	7,626	21.39	+5.67
Progress Party	7,381	20.71	+4.98
Christian People's Party	2,935	8.23	-2.67
Conservatives	2,235	6.27	+2.51
Centre Democrats	2,018	5.66	+4.14
Social Liberals	1,144	3.21	-2.49
Justice Party of Denmark	915	2.57	+0.86
Green Left	597	1.67	+0.04
Communist Party of Denmark	364	1.02	-0.06
Left Socialists	280	0.79	-0.39
Pensioners' Party	208	0.58	New
Total	35,647		

1975 Danish general election

Parties	Vote		
Parties	Votes	%	+ / -
Venstre	14,384	41.09	+13.11
Progress Party	5,505	15.73	-3.39
Social Democrats	5,502	15.72	+1.77
Christian People's Party	3,817	10.90	+1.64
Social Liberals	1,994	5.70	-6.54
Conservatives	1,316	3.76	-2.81
Justice Party of Denmark	598	1.71	-0.90
Green Left	570	1.63	-0.41
Centre Democrats	531	1.52	-3.06
Left Socialists	412	1.18	+0.46
Communist Party of Denmark	378	1.08	+0.15
Total	35,007		

1973 Danish general election

Parties	Vote		
Parties	Votes	%	+ / -
Venstre	9,691	27.98	-10.96
Progress Party	6,622	19.12	New
Social Democrats	4,831	13.95	-9.21
Social Liberals	4,240	12.24	-3.13
Christian People's Party	3,207	9.26	+4.50
Conservatives	2,277	6.57	-5.13
Centre Democrats	1,588	4.58	New
Justice Party of Denmark	903	2.61	+0.50
Green Left	706	2.04	-0.96
Communist Party of Denmark	322	0.93	+0.50
Left Socialists	249	0.72	+0.19
Total	34,636		

1971 Danish general election

Parties	Vote		
Parties	Votes	%	+ / -
Venstre	12,560	38.94	-15.53
Social Democrats	7,471	23.16	+3.65
Social Liberals	4,956	15.37	+5.06
Conservatives	3,772	11.70	+1.56
Christian People's Party	1,535	4.76	New
Green Left	969	3.00	+1.28
Justice Party of Denmark	681	2.11	+0.75
Left Socialists	170	0.53	+0.05
Communist Party of Denmark	139	0.43	+0.32
Total	32,253		

=== General elections in the 1960s ===
1968 Danish general election

Parties	Vote		
Parties	Votes	%	+ / -
Venstre	7,907	54.47	+2.23
Social Democrats	2,832	19.51	-4.88
Social Liberals	1,497	10.31	+4.98
Conservatives	1,472	10.14	+0.13
Green Left	250	1.72	-1.21
Justice Party of Denmark	197	1.36	0.00
Independent Party	152	1.05	-1.15
Liberal Centre	123	0.85	-0.58
Left Socialists	69	0.48	New
Communist Party of Denmark	16	0.11	0.00
Total	14,515		

1966 Danish general election

Parties	Vote		
Parties	Votes	%	+ / -
Venstre	7,360	52.24	-1.26
Social Democrats	3,436	24.39	-0.07
Conservatives	1,410	10.01	-0.20
Social Liberals	751	5.33	+1.20
Green Left	413	2.93	+1.72
Independent Party	310	2.20	-0.75
Liberal Centre	202	1.43	New
Justice Party of Denmark	192	1.36	-1.19
Communist Party of Denmark	16	0.11	-0.07
Total	14,090		

1964 Danish general election

Parties	Vote		
Parties	Votes	%	+ / -
Venstre	7,121	53.50	-1.65
Social Democrats	3,256	24.46	+1.53
Conservatives	1,359	10.21	+3.23
Social Liberals	550	4.13	-0.19
Independent Party	393	2.95	-2.53
Justice Party of Denmark	340	2.55	-0.92
Green Left	161	1.21	-0.03
Danish Unity	66	0.50	New
Peace Politics People's Party	40	0.30	New
Communist Party of Denmark	24	0.18	+0.06
Total	13,310		

1960 Danish general election

Parties	Vote		
Parties	Votes	%	+ / -
Venstre	6,799	55.15	-6.29
Social Democrats	2,827	22.93	+4.38
Conservatives	861	6.98	+2.01
Independent Party	676	5.48	+1.46
Social Liberals	532	4.32	-0.24
Justice Party of Denmark	428	3.47	-2.63
Green Left	153	1.24	New
Jon Galster	37	0.30	New
Communist Party of Denmark	15	0.12	-0.23
Total	12,328		

=== General elections in the 1950s ===
1957 Danish general election

Parties	Vote		
Parties	Votes	%	+ / -
Venstre	7,273	61.44	+2.94
Social Democrats	2,196	18.55	-2.54
Justice Party of Denmark	722	6.10	+1.59
Conservatives	588	4.97	+0.51
Social Liberals	540	4.56	+0.15
Independent Party	476	4.02	-2.43
Communist Party of Denmark	42	0.35	-0.23
Total	11,837		

September 1953 Danish Folketing election

Parties	Vote		
Parties	Votes	%	+ / -
Venstre	6,739	58.50	-1.39
Social Democrats	2,430	21.09	+0.65
Independent Party	743	6.45	New
Justice Party of Denmark	519	4.51	-3.11
Conservatives	514	4.46	-1.13
Social Liberals	508	4.41	-0.50
Communist Party of Denmark	67	0.58	-0.15
Total	11,520		

April 1953 Danish Folketing election

Parties	Vote		
Parties	Votes	%	+ / -
Venstre	6,171	59.89	-0.85
Social Democrats	2,106	20.44	+1.46
Justice Party of Denmark	785	7.62	-1.66
Conservatives	576	5.59	-0.19
Social Liberals	506	4.91	+0.38
Danish Unity	85	0.82	New
Communist Party of Denmark	75	0.73	+0.04
Total	10,304		

1950 Danish Folketing election

Parties	Vote		
Parties	Votes	%	+ / -
Venstre	6,680	60.74	-5.08
Social Democrats	2,087	18.98	+0.62
Justice Party of Denmark	1,021	9.28	+4.17
Conservatives	636	5.78	+2.04
Social Liberals	498	4.53	+0.34
Communist Party of Denmark	76	0.69	-0.48
Total	10,998		

=== General elections in the 1940s ===
1947 Danish Folketing election

Parties	Vote		
Parties	Votes	%	+ / -
Venstre	7,392	65.82	+2.37
Social Democrats	2,062	18.36	+1.63
Justice Party of Denmark	574	5.11	+2.63
Social Liberals	471	4.19	-2.43
Conservatives	420	3.74	-1.19
Danish Unity	180	1.60	-1.87
Communist Party of Denmark	131	1.17	-1.15
Total	11,230		

1945 Danish Folketing election

Parties	Vote		
Parties	Votes	%	+ / -
Venstre	6,961	63.45	+3.10
Social Democrats	1,835	16.73	-3.24
Social Liberals	726	6.62	+0.98
Conservatives	541	4.93	-1.46
Danish Unity	381	3.47	+2.83
Justice Party of Denmark	272	2.48	-0.16
Communist Party of Denmark	255	2.32	New
Total	10,971		

1943 Danish Folketing election

Parties	Vote		
Parties	Votes	%	+ / -
Venstre	6,539	60.35	+2.37
Social Democrats	2,164	19.97	+5.21
Conservatives	692	6.39	-0.16
Social Liberals	611	5.64	-1.48
Justice Party of Denmark	286	2.64	-0.69
Farmers' Party	237	2.19	-5.36
National Socialist Workers' Party of Denmark	237	2.19	+1.09
Danish Unity	69	0.64	-0.23
Total	10,835		

=== General elections in the 1930s ===
1939 Danish Folketing election

Parties	Vote		
Parties	Votes	%	+ / -
Venstre	5,252	57.98	+0.85
Social Democrats	1,337	14.76	-2.12
Farmers' Party	684	7.55	-0.87
Social Liberals	645	7.12	+0.43
Conservatives	593	6.55	-0.54
Justice Party of Denmark	302	3.33	+0.65
National Socialist Workers' Party of Denmark	100	1.10	+0.56
Danish Unity	79	0.87	New
Communist Party of Denmark	36	0.40	-0.17
National Cooperation	31	0.34	New
Total	9,059		

1935 Danish Folketing election

Parties	Vote		
Parties	Votes	%	+ / -
Venstre	5,218	57.13	-13.16
Social Democrats	1,542	16.88	+2.27
Independent People's Party	769	8.42	New
Conservatives	648	7.09	+1.80
Social Liberals	611	6.69	-0.24
Justice Party of Denmark	245	2.68	-0.19
Communist Party of Denmark	52	0.57	New
National Socialist Workers' Party of Denmark	49	0.54	New
Total	9,134		

1932 Danish Folketing election

Parties	Vote		
Parties	Votes	%	+ / -
Venstre	6,360	70.29	-3.35
Social Democrats	1,322	14.61	+1.37
Social Liberals	627	6.93	-0.68
Conservatives	479	5.29	+1.04
Justice Party of Denmark	260	2.87	+1.60
Total	9,048		

=== General elections in the 1920s ===
1929 Danish Folketing election

Parties	Vote		
Parties	Votes	%	+ / -
Venstre	6,396	73.64	-2.53
Social Democrats	1,150	13.24	+2.15
Social Liberals	661	7.61	+0.52
Conservatives	369	4.25	-0.57
Justice Party of Denmark	110	1.27	+0.45
Total	8,686		

1926 Danish Folketing election

Parties	Vote		
Parties	Votes	%	+ / -
Venstre	6,206	76.17	-0.68
Social Democrats	904	11.09	+0.22
Social Liberals	578	7.09	+0.27
Conservatives	393	4.82	+0.50
Justice Party of Denmark	67	0.82	-0.07
Total	8,148		

1924 Danish Folketing election

Parties	Vote		
Parties	Votes	%	+ / -
Venstre	6,292	76.85	-7.00
Social Democrats	890	10.87	+2.44
Social Liberals	558	6.82	+1.44
Conservatives	354	4.32	+2.21
Justice Party of Denmark	73	0.89	New
Farmer Party	20	0.24	New
Total	8,187		

September 1920 Danish Folketing election

Parties	Vote		
Parties	Votes	%	+ / -
Venstre	6,762	83.85	-2.74
Social Democrats	680	8.43	+1.54
Social Liberals	434	5.38	+1.20
Conservatives	170	2.11	-0.03
Industry Party	18	0.22	+0.02
Total	8,064		

July 1920 Danish Folketing election

Parties	Vote		
Parties	Votes	%	+ / -
Venstre	5,946	86.59	+1.09
Social Democrats	473	6.89	+0.32
Social Liberals	287	4.18	-1.00
Conservatives	147	2.14	-0.61
Industry Party	14	0.20	New
Total	6,867		

April 1920 Danish Folketing election

Parties	Vote	
Parties	Votes	%
Venstre	5,996	85.50
Social Democrats	461	6.57
Social Liberals	363	5.18
Conservatives	193	2.75
Total	7,013	

== European Parliament elections results ==
2024 European Parliament election in Denmark

Parties	Vote		
Parties	Votes	%	+ / -
Venstre	6,208	26.63	-18.01
Denmark Democrats	4,167	17.88	New
Social Democrats	2,767	11.87	-5.13
Conservatives	2,559	10.98	+4.42
Green Left	2,171	9.31	+2.14
Liberal Alliance	1,684	7.22	+5.24
Danish People's Party	1,495	6.41	-4.44
Moderates	1,003	4.30	New
Social Liberals	705	3.02	-2.62
Red–Green Alliance	333	1.43	-0.64
The Alternative	217	0.93	-0.39
Total	23,309		

2019 European Parliament election in Denmark

Parties	Vote		
Parties	Votes	%	+ / -
Venstre	11,720	44.64	+11.97
Social Democrats	4,462	17.00	+3.95
Danish People's Party	2,849	10.85	-16.26
Green Left	1,883	7.17	+1.49
Conservatives	1,722	6.56	-4.91
Social Liberals	1,481	5.64	+2.07
People's Movement against the EU	726	2.77	-1.56
Red–Green Alliance	544	2.07	New
Liberal Alliance	520	1.98	-0.14
The Alternative	346	1.32	New
Total	26,253		

2014 European Parliament election in Denmark

Parties	Vote		
Parties	Votes	%	+ / -
Venstre	7,497	32.67	-1.80
Danish People's Party	6,221	27.11	+13.20
Social Democrats	2,994	13.05	-1.25
Conservatives	2,632	11.47	-7.74
Green Left	1,303	5.68	-4.28
People's Movement against the EU	993	4.33	+0.54
Social Liberals	819	3.57	+1.21
Liberal Alliance	486	2.12	+1.71
Total	22,945		

2009 European Parliament election in Denmark

Parties	Vote		
Parties	Votes	%	+ / -
Venstre	8,560	34.47	-1.18
Conservatives	4,770	19.21	+11.44
Social Democrats	3,551	14.30	-12.98
Danish People's Party	3,454	13.91	+8.39
Green Left	2,473	9.96	+5.31
People's Movement against the EU	941	3.79	+0.49
Social Liberals	587	2.36	-1.82
June Movement	397	1.60	-5.14
Liberal Alliance	103	0.41	New
Total	24,836		

2004 European Parliament election in Denmark

Parties	Vote		
Parties	Votes	%	+ / -
Venstre	7,610	35.65	-2.81
Social Democrats	5,823	27.28	+16.08
Conservatives	1,658	7.77	+0.66
June Movement	1,439	6.74	-5.99
Danish People's Party	1,179	5.52	+1.09
Christian Democrats	1,045	4.90	-1.19
Green Left	993	4.65	-1.20
Social Liberals	893	4.18	-2.47
People's Movement against the EU	704	3.30	-1.41
Total	21,344		

1999 European Parliament election in Denmark

Parties	Vote		
Parties	Votes	%	+ / -
Venstre	8,199	38.46	+4.97
June Movement	2,713	12.73	+1.00
Social Democrats	2,388	11.20	0.00
Conservatives	1,515	7.11	-12.41
Social Liberals	1,418	6.65	+0.76
Christian Democrats	1,298	6.09	+2.36
Green Left	1,247	5.85	+1.00
People's Movement against the EU	1,004	4.71	-0.89
Danish People's Party	944	4.43	New
Centre Democrats	593	2.78	+2.13
Progress Party	308	1.44	-1.90
Total	21,319		

1994 European Parliament election in Denmark

Parties	Vote		
Parties	Votes	%	+ / -
Venstre	7,914	33.49	-1.08
Conservatives	4,612	19.52	+7.04
June Movement	2,771	11.73	New
Social Democrats	2,647	11.20	-3.33
Social Liberals	1,391	5.89	+3.68
People's Movement against the EU	1,324	5.60	-3.69
Green Left	1,146	4.85	+0.33
Christian Democrats	881	3.73	-4.52
Progress Party	789	3.34	-2.84
Centre Democrats	153	0.65	-7.31
Total	23,628		

1989 European Parliament election in Denmark

Parties	Vote		
Parties	Votes	%	+ / -
Venstre	6,903	34.57	+0.18
Social Democrats	2,902	14.53	+2.90
Conservatives	2,492	12.48	-4.47
People's Movement against the EU	1,855	9.29	-1.64
Christian Democrats	1,647	8.25	+0.60
Centre Democrats	1,590	7.96	-0.32
Progress Party	1,234	6.18	+2.31
Green Left	903	4.52	+1.06
Social Liberals	442	2.21	-0.25
Total	19,968		

1984 European Parliament election in Denmark

Parties	Vote	
Parties	Votes	%
Venstre	8,098	34.39
Conservatives	3,992	16.95
Social Democrats	2,738	11.63
People's Movement against the EU	2,573	10.93
Centre Democrats	1,949	8.28
Christian Democrats	1,801	7.65
Progress Party	911	3.87
Green Left	815	3.46
Social Liberals	580	2.46
Left Socialists	91	0.39
Total	23,548	

== Referendums ==
2022 Danish European Union opt-out referendum

Option	Votes	%
✓ YES	17,611	65.36
X NO	9,333	34.64

2015 Danish European Union opt-out referendum

Option	Votes	%
✓ YES	14,963	50.85
X NO	14,464	49.15

2014 Danish Unified Patent Court membership referendum

Option	Votes	%
✓ YES	14,955	67.87
X NO	7,080	32.13

2009 Danish Act of Succession referendum

Option	Votes	%
✓ YES	20,667	85.52
X NO	3,498	14.48

2000 Danish euro referendum

Option	Votes	%
X NO	20,243	50.48
✓ YES	19,858	49.52

1998 Danish Amsterdam Treaty referendum

Option	Votes	%
✓ YES	20,930	60.26
X NO	13,804	39.74

1993 Danish Maastricht Treaty referendum

Option	Votes	%
✓ YES	26,053	65.66
X NO	13,625	34.34

1992 Danish Maastricht Treaty referendum

Option	Votes	%
✓ YES	21,488	56.92
X NO	16,260	43.08

1986 Danish Single European Act referendum

Option	Votes	%
✓ YES	27,582	77.39
X NO	8,056	22.61

1972 Danish European Communities membership referendum

Option	Votes	%
✓ YES	25,897	76.25
X NO	8,068	23.75

1953 Danish constitutional and electoral age referendum

Option	Votes	%
✓ YES	5,541	78.22
X NO	1,543	21.78
23 years	5,316	74.19
21 years	1,849	25.81

1939 Danish constitutional referendum

Option	Votes	%
✓ YES	1,399	75.38
X NO	457	24.62
