= List of members of the European Parliament for Denmark, 1999–2004 =

Members of the European Parliament for Denmark
Delegation	(1973)
1st term	(1979)
2nd term	(1984)
3rd term	(1989)
4th term	(1994)
5th term	(1999)
6th term	(2004)
7th term	(2009)
8th term	(2014)
9th term	(2019)
10th term	(2024)

This is a list of the 16 members of the European Parliament for Denmark in the 1999 to 2004 session.

== List ==
Name	National party	EP Group	Votes
Ole Andreasen	Left, Liberal Party	ELDR	22,349
Freddy Blak	Social Democrats (until 8 December 2002) Free Social Democrats	PES (until 18 December 2001) EUL–NGL	61,703
Jens-Peter Bonde	June Movement	EDD	117,778
Niels Busk	Left, Liberal Party	ELDR	16,150
Mogens Camre	People's Party	UEN	77,104
Lone Dybkjær	Social Liberal Party	ELDR	123,514
Pernille Frahm	Socialist People's Party	EUL–NGL	84,858
Bertel Haarder	Left, Liberal Party	ELDR	180,974
Anne Jensen	Left, Liberal Party	ELDR	36,925
Ole Krarup	People's Movement against the EU	EDD (until 30 June 2002); EUL–NGL	63,251
Torben Lund	Social Democrats	PES	84,208
Jens Okking (until 28 February 2003) Bent Andersen (from 1 March 2003)	June Movement (until 13 October 2002); People's Movement against the EU	EDD (until 30 June 2002); EUL–NGL (until 28 February 2003) EDD	44,276
Karin Riis-Jørgensen	Left, Liberal Party	ELDR	43,496
Christian Rovsing	Conservative People's Party	EPP–ED	81,539
Ulla Sandbæk	June Movement	EDD	34,885
Helle Thorning-Schmidt	Social Democrats	PES	22,890

=== Party representation ===
National party	EP Group	Seats	±
Left, Liberal Party	ELDR	5 / 16	▲1
Social Democrats	PES	3 / 16	Steady
June Movement	EDD	3 / 16	▲1
Social Liberal Party	ALDE	1 / 16	Steady
Conservative People's Party	EPP–ED	1 / 16	▼2
People's Movement against the EU	EUL–NGL	1 / 16	▼1
Socialist People's Party	G–EFA	1 / 16	Steady
People's Party	UEN	1 / 16	▲1

== Sources ==
- List of Danish MEPs (in Danish)
