= List of members of the European Parliament for Denmark, 2014–2019 =

Members of the European Parliament for Denmark
Delegation	(1973)
1st term	(1979)
2nd term	(1984)
3rd term	(1989)
4th term	(1994)
5th term	(1999)
6th term	(2004)
7th term	(2009)
8th term	(2014)
9th term	(2019)
10th term	(2024)

This is the list of the 13 members of the European Parliament for Denmark in the 2014 to 2019 session. The members were elected in the 2014 European Parliament election in Denmark

== List ==
Name	National party	EP Group	Preference votes
Morten Messerschmidt	Danish People's Party (DF)	ECR	465,758
Rikke Karlsson	Danish People's Party (DF) (until 15 October 2015) Independent	ECR (until 20 February 2018) NI	9,205
Anders Primdahl Vistisen	Danish People's Party (DF)	ECR	8,315
Jørn Dohrmann	Danish People's Party (DF)	ECR	6,439
Jeppe Kofod	Social Democrats (S)	S&D	170,739
Christel Schaldemose	Social Democrats (S)	S&D	43,855
Ole Christensen	Social Democrats (S)	S&D	20,597
Ulla Tørnæs (until 29 February 2016); Morten Løkkegaard (from 3 March 2016)	Venstre (V)	ALDE	136,388; 43,960
Jens Rohde	Venstre (V) (until 18 December 2015) Social Liberal Party (RV)	ALDE	48,882
Margrete Auken	Socialist People's Party (SF)	G–EFA	153,072
Bendt Bendtsen	Conservative People's Party (KF)	EPP	151,274
Rina Ronja Kari	People's Movement against the EU	EUL–NGL	63,673
Morten Helveg Petersen	Social Liberal Party (RV)	ALDE	76,390
