= Aabenraa (nomination district) =

Nominating district for Danish elections

- Aabenraa
- Nomination district constituency for the Folketing
- Location of Aabenraa within South Jutland

- Location of South Jutland within Denmark
- Municipalities: Aabenraa
- Constituency: South Jutland
- Electorate: 41,587 (2022)

Current constituency
- Created: 1920

Aabenraa nominating district is one of the 92 nominating districts that exists for Danish elections following the 2007 municipal reform. It consists of Aabenraa Municipality. It was created in 1920 following its reunification with Denmark, though its boundaries have been changed since then.

In general elections, the district is a very strong area for parties commonly associated with the blue bloc.

== General elections results ==
=== General elections in the 2020s ===
2022 Danish general election

Parties	Vote		
Parties	Votes	%	+ / -
Social Democrats	9,695	28.85	+3.05
Venstre	5,357	15.94	-15.12
Denmark Democrats	4,775	14.21	New
Moderates	2,736	8.14	New
New Right	2,665	7.93	+3.29
Liberal Alliance	2,234	6.65	+5.12
Conservatives	1,558	4.64	+0.55
Green Left	1,454	4.33	+0.11
Danish People's Party	1,158	3.45	-11.33
Social Liberals	661	1.97	-2.85
Red–Green Alliance	618	1.84	-1.34
The Alternative	359	1.07	-0.10
Christian Democrats	220	0.65	-1.32
Independent Greens	82	0.24	New
Kent Nielsen	26	0.08	New
Kenneth Vestergaard	10	0.03	New
Total	33,608		

=== General elections in the 2010s ===
2019 Danish general election

Parties	Vote		
Parties	Votes	%	+ / -
Venstre	10,666	31.06	+6.57
Social Democrats	8,858	25.80	+3.87
Danish People's Party	5,076	14.78	-17.02
Social Liberals	1,655	4.82	+1.54
New Right	1,593	4.64	New
Green Left	1,449	4.22	+1.92
Conservatives	1,403	4.09	+2.31
Red–Green Alliance	1,092	3.18	-1.31
Stram Kurs	695	2.02	New
Christian Democrats	678	1.97	+0.98
Liberal Alliance	525	1.53	-5.46
The Alternative	401	1.17	-0.78
Klaus Riskær Pedersen Party	226	0.66	New
Michael Thomsen	20	0.06	New
Total	34,337		

2015 Danish general election

Parties	Vote		
Parties	Votes	%	+ / -
Danish People's Party	11,392	31.80	+16.17
Venstre	8,773	24.49	-11.48
Social Democrats	7,857	21.93	-2.94
Liberal Alliance	2,503	6.99	+2.78
Red–Green Alliance	1,608	4.49	+1.36
Social Liberals	1,175	3.28	-2.45
Green Left	823	2.30	-3.69
The Alternative	700	1.95	New
Conservatives	639	1.78	-1.67
Christian Democrats	354	0.99	-0.01
Total	35,824		

2011 Danish general election

Parties	Vote		
Parties	Votes	%	+ / -
Venstre	13,144	35.97	-1.22
Social Democrats	9,088	24.87	+1.98
Danish People's Party	5,711	15.63	-1.50
Green Left	2,188	5.99	-2.47
Social Liberals	2,092	5.73	+2.78
Liberal Alliance	1,538	4.21	+2.59
Conservatives	1,259	3.45	-4.83
Red–Green Alliance	1,142	3.13	+2.49
Christian Democrats	367	1.00	+0.16
Jørn Bjorholm	7	0.02	New
Niesl-Aage Bjerre	4	0.01	New
Total	36,540		

=== General elections in the 2000s ===
2007 Danish general election

Parties	Vote		
Parties	Votes	%	+ / -
Venstre	13,637	37.19	+0.76
Social Democrats	8,395	22.89	-2.72
Danish People's Party	6,282	17.13	+1.66
Green Left	3,101	8.46	+4.08
Conservatives	3,037	8.28	+0.50
Social Liberals	1,081	2.95	-2.75
New Alliance	594	1.62	New
Christian Democrats	307	0.84	-1.05
Red–Green Alliance	236	0.64	-0.93
Total	36,670		

2005 Danish general election

Parties	Vote		
Parties	Votes	%	+ / -
Venstre	8,890	36.43	-0.37
Social Democrats	6,250	25.61	-3.00
Danish People's Party	3,775	15.47	+0.85
Conservatives	1,899	7.78	+0.60
Social Liberals	1,392	5.70	+1.98
Green Left	1,070	4.38	+0.68
Christian Democrats	461	1.89	-0.34
Red–Green Alliance	384	1.57	+0.55
Centre Democrats	229	0.94	-0.44
Minority Party	53	0.22	New
Total	24,403		

2001 Danish general election

Parties	Vote		
Parties	Votes	%	+ / -
Venstre	9,247	36.80	+7.24
Social Democrats	7,190	28.61	-7.04
Danish People's Party	3,673	14.62	+5.30
Conservatives	1,805	7.18	+0.61
Social Liberals	934	3.72	+0.99
Green Left	929	3.70	-0.96
Christian People's Party	560	2.23	-0.50
Centre Democrats	347	1.38	-2.24
Red–Green Alliance	256	1.02	-0.02
Progress Party	186	0.74	-2.71
Total	25,127		

=== General elections in the 1990s ===
1998 Danish general election

Parties	Vote		
Parties	Votes	%	+ / -
Social Democrats	8,800	35.65	+1.00
Venstre	7,298	29.56	+1.84
Danish People's Party	2,300	9.32	New
Conservatives	1,623	6.57	-7.64
Green Left	1,150	4.66	+0.18
Centre Democrats	894	3.62	+1.62
Progress Party	852	3.45	-6.47
Social Liberals	674	2.73	-0.69
Christian People's Party	674	2.73	+0.65
Red–Green Alliance	256	1.04	-0.43
Democratic Renewal	154	0.62	New
Leon Elmkjær	11	0.04	0.00
Total	24,686		

1994 Danish general election

Parties	Vote		
Parties	Votes	%	+ / -
Social Democrats	8,272	34.65	-1.84
Venstre	6,617	27.72	+8.96
Conservatives	3,392	14.21	-3.06
Progress Party	2,367	9.92	-0.80
Green Left	1,069	4.48	-0.21
Social Liberals	817	3.42	+0.65
Christian People's Party	497	2.08	-0.36
Centre Democrats	477	2.00	-1.74
Red–Green Alliance	352	1.47	+0.91
Leon Elmkjær	10	0.04	New
Total	23,870		

1990 Danish general election

Parties	Vote		
Parties	Votes	%	+ / -
Social Democrats	8,569	36.49	+6.09
Venstre	4,406	18.76	+3.63
Conservatives	4,056	17.27	-3.96
Progress Party	2,518	10.72	-2.23
Green Left	1,102	4.69	-2.24
Centre Democrats	879	3.74	+0.30
Social Liberals	650	2.77	-1.76
Christian People's Party	572	2.44	+0.08
Common Course	323	1.38	+0.02
The Greens	177	0.75	-0.27
Red–Green Alliance	132	0.56	New
Justice Party of Denmark	99	0.42	New
Total	23,483		

=== General elections in the 1980s ===
1988 Danish general election

Parties	Vote		
Parties	Votes	%	+ / -
Social Democrats	7,248	30.40	-1.51
Conservatives	5,063	21.23	-3.46
Venstre	3,607	15.13	+1.18
Progress Party	3,087	12.95	+5.75
Green Left	1,653	6.93	-0.71
Social Liberals	1,081	4.53	-0.23
Centre Democrats	821	3.44	+0.41
Christian People's Party	562	2.36	-0.42
Common Course	325	1.36	+0.23
The Greens	243	1.02	-0.16
Communist Party of Denmark	78	0.33	-0.05
Left Socialists	78	0.33	-0.49
Total	23,846		

1987 Danish general election

Parties	Vote		
Parties	Votes	%	+ / -
Social Democrats	7,705	31.91	+0.71
Conservatives	5,961	24.69	-3.46
Venstre	3,367	13.95	-0.53
Green Left	1,845	7.64	+1.37
Progress Party	1,738	7.20	+1.54
Social Liberals	1,150	4.76	+0.40
Centre Democrats	731	3.03	-0.93
Christian People's Party	671	2.78	-0.41
The Greens	285	1.18	New
Common Course	273	1.13	New
Left Socialists	197	0.82	-0.58
Justice Party of Denmark	94	0.39	-0.60
Communist Party of Denmark	91	0.38	+0.07
Humanist Party	28	0.12	New
Socialist Workers Party	5	0.02	-0.01
Marxist–Leninists Party	3	0.01	-0.01
Total	24,144		

1984 Danish general election

Parties	Vote		
Parties	Votes	%	+ / -
Social Democrats	7,445	31.20	-2.72
Conservatives	6,716	28.15	+12.33
Venstre	3,456	14.48	-1.05
Green Left	1,495	6.27	+0.45
Progress Party	1,350	5.66	-6.82
Social Liberals	1,040	4.36	+0.20
Centre Democrats	944	3.96	-2.49
Christian People's Party	760	3.19	+0.40
Left Socialists	334	1.40	-0.02
Justice Party of Denmark	237	0.99	-0.11
Communist Party of Denmark	74	0.31	-0.09
Socialist Workers Party	6	0.03	-0.05
Marxist–Leninists Party	4	0.02	New
Total	23,861		

1981 Danish general election

Parties	Vote		
Parties	Votes	%	+ / -
Social Democrats	7,423	33.92	-4.50
Conservatives	3,462	15.82	+3.49
Venstre	3,400	15.53	+0.31
Progress Party	2,732	12.48	-3.57
Centre Democrats	1,411	6.45	+3.51
Green Left	1,274	5.82	+2.76
Social Liberals	910	4.16	+0.03
Christian People's Party	611	2.79	-0.38
Left Socialists	310	1.42	-0.33
Justice Party of Denmark	240	1.10	-0.87
Communist Party of Denmark	87	0.40	-0.25
Socialist Workers Party	18	0.08	New
Communist Workers Party	9	0.04	-0.27
Total	21,887		

=== General elections in the 1970s ===
1979 Danish general election

Parties	Vote		
Parties	Votes	%	+ / -
Social Democrats	8,410	38.42	+3.69
Progress Party	3,513	16.05	-4.77
Venstre	3,331	15.22	+1.49
Conservatives	2,698	12.33	+4.43
Social Liberals	905	4.13	+1.16
Christian People's Party	694	3.17	-0.92
Green Left	670	3.06	+1.30
Centre Democrats	644	2.94	-5.43
Justice Party of Denmark	431	1.97	-0.29
Left Socialists	382	1.75	+0.59
Communist Party of Denmark	143	0.65	-0.65
Communist Workers Party	68	0.31	New
Total	21,889		

1977 Danish general election

Parties	Vote		
Parties	Votes	%	+ / -
Social Democrats	7,488	34.73	+6.11
Progress Party	4,488	20.82	+1.29
Venstre	2,960	13.73	-9.75
Centre Democrats	1,804	8.37	+2.87
Conservatives	1,703	7.90	+1.84
Christian People's Party	882	4.09	-1.71
Social Liberals	641	2.97	-2.79
Justice Party of Denmark	488	2.26	+1.05
Green Left	380	1.76	-0.24
Communist Party of Denmark	280	1.30	0.00
Left Socialists	251	1.16	+0.44
Pensioners' Party	193	0.90	New
Total	21,558		

1975 Danish general election

Parties	Vote		
Parties	Votes	%	+ / -
Social Democrats	5,963	28.62	+2.34
Venstre	4,893	23.48	+11.24
Progress Party	4,070	19.53	-1.50
Conservatives	1,263	6.06	-4.31
Christian People's Party	1,209	5.80	+1.06
Social Liberals	1,200	5.76	-3.95
Centre Democrats	1,146	5.50	-4.03
Green Left	417	2.00	-0.38
Communist Party of Denmark	271	1.30	+0.46
Justice Party of Denmark	252	1.21	-1.03
Left Socialists	149	0.72	+0.14
Marinus Roth	4	0.02	-0.05
Total	20,837		

1973 Danish general election

Parties	Vote		
Parties	Votes	%	+ / -
Social Democrats	5,421	26.28	-12.19
Progress Party	4,339	21.03	New
Venstre	2,525	12.24	-4.57
Conservatives	2,140	10.37	-7.38
Social Liberals	2,003	9.71	-2.12
Centre Democrats	1,966	9.53	New
Christian People's Party	978	4.74	+2.04
Green Left	490	2.38	-1.40
Justice Party of Denmark	462	2.24	+1.06
Communist Party of Denmark	173	0.84	+0.69
Left Socialists	119	0.58	+0.19
Marinus Roth	14	0.07	+0.06
Total	20,630		

1971 Danish general election

Parties	Vote		
Parties	Votes	%	+ / -
Social Democrats	7,357	38.47	+1.53
Conservatives	3,395	17.75	-3.75
Venstre	3,214	16.81	-1.60
Social Liberals	2,262	11.83	+1.43
Schleswig Party	1,327	6.94	-0.82
Green Left	723	3.78	+1.55
Christian People's Party	517	2.70	New
Justice Party of Denmark	226	1.18	+0.77
Left Socialists	74	0.39	-0.17
Communist Party of Denmark	29	0.15	-0.06
Marinus Roth	1	0.01	New
Total	19,125		

=== General elections in the 1960s ===
1968 Danish general election

Parties	Vote		
Parties	Votes	%	+ / -
Social Democrats	7,167	36.94	-8.59
Conservatives	4,172	21.50	-1.05
Venstre	3,573	18.41	-1.53
Social Liberals	2,017	10.40	+5.66
Schleswig Party	1,506	7.76	New
Green Left	433	2.23	-0.90
Liberal Centre	199	1.03	-0.59
Independent Party	108	0.56	-1.33
Left Socialists	108	0.56	New
Justice Party of Denmark	79	0.41	+0.01
Communist Party of Denmark	41	0.21	+0.02
Total	19,403		

1966 Danish general election

Parties	Vote		
Parties	Votes	%	+ / -
Social Democrats	8,341	45.53	+5.16
Conservatives	4,132	22.55	+3.09
Venstre	3,653	19.94	+0.88
Social Liberals	869	4.74	+1.46
Green Left	574	3.13	+1.53
Independent Party	347	1.89	-1.05
Liberal Centre	296	1.62	New
Justice Party of Denmark	74	0.40	-0.41
Communist Party of Denmark	35	0.19	-0.07
Total	18,321		

1964 Danish general election

Parties	Vote		
Parties	Votes	%	+ / -
Social Democrats	7,238	40.37	+0.57
Conservatives	3,490	19.46	+2.93
Venstre	3,417	19.06	-1.92
Schleswig Party	2,096	11.69	-0.38
Social Liberals	589	3.28	-0.54
Independent Party	528	2.94	-0.38
Green Left	287	1.60	+0.01
Justice Party of Denmark	145	0.81	-0.79
Danish Unity	95	0.53	New
Communist Party of Denmark	46	0.26	-0.04
Total	17,931		

1960 Danish general election

Parties	Vote		
Parties	Votes	%	+ / -
Social Democrats	6,603	39.80	+3.17
Venstre	3,481	20.98	-2.66
Conservatives	2,742	16.53	+0.87
Schleswig Party	2,003	12.07	-1.06
Social Liberals	634	3.82	-0.84
Independent Party	550	3.32	+1.25
Justice Party of Denmark	266	1.60	-1.81
Green Left	263	1.59	New
Communist Party of Denmark	49	0.30	-0.50
Total	16,591		

=== General elections in the 1950s ===
1957 Danish general election

Parties	Vote		
Parties	Votes	%	+ / -
Social Democrats	5,757	36.63	-1.37
Venstre	3,716	23.64	+1.32
Conservatives	2,462	15.66	+0.05
Schleswig Party	2,063	13.13	New
Social Liberals	733	4.66	+0.18
Justice Party of Denmark	536	3.41	+0.92
Independent Party	326	2.07	+0.27
Communist Party of Denmark	125	0.80	-0.22
Total	15,718		

September 1953 Danish Folketing election

Parties	Vote		
Parties	Votes	%	+ / -
Social Democrats	5,866	38.00	+0.28
Venstre	3,445	22.32	+1.05
Conservatives	2,409	15.61	+0.11
Hans Schmidt	2,205	14.28	+0.85
Social Liberals	692	4.48	-0.16
Justice Party of Denmark	384	2.49	-2.32
Independent Party	278	1.80	New
Communist Party of Denmark	158	1.02	-0.09
Total	15,437		

April 1953 Danish Folketing election

Parties	Vote		
Parties	Votes	%	+ / -
Social Democrats	5,409	37.72	-1.49
Venstre	3,051	21.27	+1.28
Conservatives	2,223	15.50	-2.37
Hans Schmidt	1,926	13.43	+2.60
Justice Party of Denmark	690	4.81	-1.46
Social Liberals	666	4.64	-0.11
Danish Unity	217	1.51	New
Communist Party of Denmark	159	1.11	+0.03
Total	14,341		

1950 Danish Folketing election

Parties	Vote		
Parties	Votes	%	+ / -
Social Democrats	5,291	39.21	+0.22
Venstre	2,698	19.99	-3.97
Conservatives	2,411	17.87	+7.30
Hans Schmidt	1,461	10.83	New
Justice Party of Denmark	846	6.27	+4.01
Social Liberals	641	4.75	+0.93
Communist Party of Denmark	146	1.08	-0.45
Total	13,494		

=== General elections in the 1940s ===
1947 Danish Folketing election

Parties	Vote		
Parties	Votes	%	+ / -
Social Democrats	5,439	38.99	-0.02
Venstre	3,342	23.96	-5.08
W. Reuter	1,662	11.92	New
Conservatives	1,474	10.57	-6.24
J. Christmas Møller	662	4.75	New
Social Liberals	533	3.82	-1.22
Justice Party of Denmark	315	2.26	+0.97
Danish Unity	308	2.21	-3.43
Communist Party of Denmark	213	1.53	-1.64
Total	13,948		

1945 Danish Folketing election

Parties	Vote		
Parties	Votes	%	+ / -
Social Democrats	5,164	39.01	-4.43
Venstre	3,844	29.04	+11.48
Conservatives	2,225	16.81	-2.08
Danish Unity	747	5.64	+2.11
Social Liberals	667	5.04	-0.77
Communist Party of Denmark	420	3.17	New
Justice Party of Denmark	171	1.29	+0.43
Total	13,238		

1943 Danish Folketing election

Parties	Vote		
Parties	Votes	%	+ / -
Social Democrats	5,171	43.44	+9.95
Conservatives	2,248	18.89	+3.57
Venstre	2,090	17.56	+2.52
National Socialist Workers' Party of Denmark	1,032	8.67	+1.52
Social Liberals	691	5.81	+0.58
Danish Unity	420	3.53	New
Farmers' Party	149	1.25	New
Justice Party of Denmark	102	0.86	+0.16
Total	11,903		

=== General elections in the 1930s ===
1939 Danish Folketing election

Parties	Vote		
Parties	Votes	%	+ / -
Social Democrats	4,803	33.49	-0.26
Schleswig Party	3,152	21.98	+0.92
Conservatives	2,197	15.32	+0.03
Venstre	2,157	15.04	+0.98
National Socialist Workers' Party of Denmark	1,025	7.15	+1.70
Social Liberals	750	5.23	+0.79
National Cooperation	158	1.10	New
Justice Party of Denmark	101	0.70	-0.75
Total	14,343		

1935 Danish Folketing election

Parties	Vote		
Parties	Votes	%	+ / -
Social Democrats	4,179	33.75	-0.02
Schleswig Party	2,608	21.06	+2.47
Conservatives	1,893	15.29	-2.96
Venstre	1,741	14.06	-7.17
National Socialist Workers' Party of Denmark	675	5.45	New
Social Liberals	550	4.44	+0.01
Independent People's Party	430	3.47	New
Justice Party of Denmark	180	1.45	-0.89
Communist Party of Denmark	102	0.82	-0.57
Society Party	26	0.21	New
Total	12,384		

1932 Danish Folketing election

Parties	Vote		
Parties	Votes	%	+ / -
Social Democrats	3,624	33.77	+1.64
Venstre	2,278	21.23	-7.19
Schleswig Party	1,995	18.59	-0.70
Conservatives	1,958	18.25	+5.68
Social Liberals	475	4.43	-0.47
Justice Party of Denmark	251	2.34	+0.29
Communist Party of Denmark	149	1.39	+0.74
Total	10,730		

=== General elections in the 1920s ===
1929 Danish Folketing election

Parties	Vote		
Parties	Votes	%	+ / -
Social Democrats	3,116	32.13	+4.60
Venstre	2,756	28.42	-1.36
Schleswig Party	1,871	19.29	-1.90
Conservatives	1,219	12.57	-0.19
Social Liberals	475	4.90	+0.49
Justice Party of Denmark	199	2.05	+1.21
Communist Party of Denmark	63	0.65	+0.60
Total	9,699		

1926 Danish Folketing election

Parties	Vote		
Parties	Votes	%	+ / -
Venstre	2,877	29.78	+0.33
Social Democrats	2,660	27.53	+0.50
Schleswig Party	2,047	21.19	+1.42
Conservatives	1,233	12.76	-1.09
Social Liberals	426	4.41	-2.59
Independence Party	333	3.45	New
Justice Party of Denmark	81	0.84	+0.73
Communist Party of Denmark	5	0.05	New
Total	9,662		

1924 Danish Folketing election

Parties	Vote		
Parties	Votes	%	+ / -
Venstre	2,388	29.45	-16.53
Social Democrats	2,192	27.03	+13.63
Schleswig Party	1,603	19.77	-2.75
Conservatives	1,123	13.85	+6.42
Social Liberals	568	7.00	-0.45
Farmer Party	227	2.80	New
Justice Party of Denmark	9	0.11	New
Total	8,110		

September 1920 Danish Folketing election

Parties	Vote		
Parties	Votes	%	+ / -
Venstre	3,359	45.98	
Schleswig Party	1,645	22.52	
Social Democrats	979	13.40	
Social Liberals	544	7.45	
Conservatives	543	7.43	
Danish Left Socialist Party	160	2.19	
Industry Party	76	1.04	
Total	7,306		

== European Parliament elections results ==
2024 European Parliament election in Denmark

Parties	Vote		
Parties	Votes	%	+ / -
Venstre	4,917	22.69	-6.54
Social Democrats	3,812	17.59	-3.98
Denmark Democrats	2,905	13.41	New
Danish People's Party	2,093	9.66	-9.48
Green Left	2,075	9.58	+2.35
Conservatives	1,646	7.60	+3.06
Liberal Alliance	1,530	7.06	+3.79
Moderates	1,069	4.93	New
Social Liberals	777	3.59	-3.22
Red–Green Alliance	573	2.64	-0.49
The Alternative	274	1.26	-0.43
Total	21,671		

2019 European Parliament election in Denmark

Parties	Vote		
Parties	Votes	%	+ / -
Venstre	7,654	29.23	+5.53
Social Democrats	5,648	21.57	+4.86
Danish People's Party	5,013	19.14	-15.22
Green Left	1,894	7.23	+1.71
Social Liberals	1,783	6.81	+3.14
Conservatives	1,189	4.54	-3.68
People's Movement against the EU	886	3.38	-2.33
Liberal Alliance	857	3.27	+1.15
Red–Green Alliance	820	3.13	New
The Alternative	443	1.69	New
Total	26,187		

2014 European Parliament election in Denmark

Parties	Vote		
Parties	Votes	%	+ / -
Danish People's Party	7,727	34.36	+15.48
Venstre	5,330	23.70	-3.70
Social Democrats	3,757	16.71	-2.97
Conservatives	1,848	8.22	-5.32
People's Movement against the EU	1,283	5.71	+0.53
Green Left	1,242	5.52	-4.02
Social Liberals	826	3.67	+0.24
Liberal Alliance	476	2.12	+1.72
Total	22,489		

2009 European Parliament election in Denmark

Parties	Vote		
Parties	Votes	%	+ / -
Venstre	6,500	27.40	+3.18
Social Democrats	4,669	19.68	-15.86
Danish People's Party	4,479	18.88	+12.43
Conservatives	3,213	13.54	+3.44
Green Left	2,262	9.54	+4.86
People's Movement against the EU	1,230	5.18	+1.85
Social Liberals	814	3.43	-0.38
June Movement	460	1.94	-8.67
Liberal Alliance	96	0.40	New
Total	23,723		

2004 European Parliament election in Denmark

Parties	Vote		
Parties	Votes	%	+ / -
Social Democrats	4,698	35.54	+20.66
Venstre	3,202	24.22	-1.22
June Movement	1,403	10.61	-8.21
Conservatives	1,335	10.10	-2.53
Danish People's Party	853	6.45	+0.40
Green Left	618	4.68	+0.85
Social Liberals	503	3.81	-4.93
People's Movement against the EU	440	3.33	-1.24
Christian Democrats	166	1.26	-0.72
Total	13,218		

1999 European Parliament election in Denmark

Parties	Vote		
Parties	Votes	%	+ / -
Venstre	3,602	25.44	+1.38
June Movement	2,664	18.82	+5.48
Social Democrats	2,107	14.88	-1.05
Conservatives	1,788	12.63	-10.30
Social Liberals	1,237	8.74	+3.92
Danish People's Party	856	6.05	New
People's Movement against the EU	647	4.57	-4.05
Green Left	542	3.83	-1.55
Centre Democrats	435	3.07	+2.37
Progress Party	407	2.87	-0.22
Christian Democrats	280	1.98	+0.86
Total	14,158		

1994 European Parliament election in Denmark

Parties	Vote		
Parties	Votes	%	+ / -
Venstre	3,601	24.06	+0.90
Conservatives	3,432	22.93	+9.31
Social Democrats	2,384	15.93	-8.45
June Movement	1,996	13.34	New
People's Movement against the EU	1,290	8.62	-4.17
Green Left	805	5.38	+0.10
Social Liberals	722	4.82	+2.48
Progress Party	462	3.09	-4.73
Christian Democrats	168	1.12	-1.91
Centre Democrats	105	0.70	-6.88
Total	14,965		

1989 European Parliament election in Denmark

Parties	Vote		
Parties	Votes	%	+ / -
Social Democrats	2,925	24.38	+3.70
Venstre	2,778	23.16	+5.99
Conservatives	1,634	13.62	-11.13
People's Movement against the EU	1,534	12.79	-1.50
Progress Party	938	7.82	+3.45
Centre Democrats	909	7.58	-0.21
Green Left	633	5.28	+1.25
Christian Democrats	364	3.03	-0.23
Social Liberals	281	2.34	-0.57
Total	11,996		

1984 European Parliament election in Denmark

Parties	Vote	
Parties	Votes	%
Conservatives	3,480	24.75
Social Democrats	2,908	20.68
Venstre	2,414	17.17
People's Movement against the EU	2,009	14.29
Centre Democrats	1,095	7.79
Progress Party	615	4.37
Green Left	567	4.03
Christian Democrats	459	3.26
Social Liberals	409	2.91
Left Socialists	105	0.75
Total	14,061	

== Referendums ==
2022 Danish European Union opt-out referendum

Option	Votes	%
✓ YES	16,458	61.26
X NO	10,410	38.74

2015 Danish European Union opt-out referendum

Option	Votes	%
X NO	16,860	55.42
✓ YES	13,561	44.58

2014 Danish Unified Patent Court membership referendum

Option	Votes	%
✓ YES	13,628	62.77
X NO	8,082	37.23

2009 Danish Act of Succession referendum

Option	Votes	%
✓ YES	19,122	84.73
X NO	3,445	15.27

2000 Danish euro referendum

Option	Votes	%
X NO	12,890	50.85
✓ YES	12,460	49.15

1998 Danish Amsterdam Treaty referendum

Option	Votes	%
✓ YES	12,611	56.36
X NO	9,766	43.64

1993 Danish Maastricht Treaty referendum

Option	Votes	%
✓ YES	15,104	60.52
X NO	9,852	39.48

1992 Danish Maastricht Treaty referendum

Option	Votes	%
✓ YES	12,529	52.94
X NO	11,137	47.06

1986 Danish Single European Act referendum

Option	Votes	%
✓ YES	14,205	67.71
X NO	6,774	32.29

1972 Danish European Communities membership referendum

Option	Votes	%
✓ YES	16,053	76.66
X NO	4,888	23.34

1953 Danish constitutional and electoral age referendum

Option	Votes	%
✓ YES	8,172	84.77
X NO	1,468	15.23
23 years	5,413	55.17
21 years	4,398	44.83

1939 Danish constitutional referendum

Option	Votes	%
✓ YES	4,571	92.96
X NO	346	7.04
