= List of members of the European Parliament for Denmark, 2009–2014 =

Members of the European Parliament for Denmark
| Delegation | (1973) |
| 1st term | (1979) |
| 2nd term | (1984) |
| 3rd term | (1989) |
| 4th term | (1994) |
| 5th term | (1999) |
| 6th term | (2004) |
| 7th term | (2009) |
| 8th term | (2014) |
| 9th term | (2019) |
| 10th term | (2024) |

The following 13 members of the European Parliament represented Denmark in the 2009 to 2014 session.

== List ==
| Name | National party | EP Group | Votes |
|---|---|---|---|
| Margrete Auken | Socialist People's Party | G–EFA | 204,111 |
| Bendt Bendtsen | Conservative People's Party | EPP | 176,786 |
| Ole Christensen | Social Democrats | S&D | 20,597 |
| Anne Elisabet Jensen | Left, Liberal Party | ALDE | 47,906 |
| Dan Jørgensen | Social Democrats | S&D | 233,266 |
| Morten Løkkegaard | Left, Liberal Party | ALDE | 57,175 |
| Morten Messerschmidt | People's Party | EFD | 284,500 |
| Jens Rohde | Left, Liberal Party | ALDE | 171,205 |
| Anna Rosbach Andersen | People's Party | EFD | 3,592 |
| Christel Schaldemose | Social Democrats | S&D | 43,855 |
| Søren Søndergaard | People's Movement against the EU | EUL–NGL | 107,429 |
| Britta Thomsen | Social Democrats | S&D | 32,569 |
| Emilie Turunen | Socialist People's Party | G–EFA | 37,330 |

=== Party representation ===
| National party | EP Group | Seats | ± |
|---|---|---|---|
| Social Democrats | S&D | 4 / 13 | ▼1 |
| Left, Liberal Party | ALDE | 3 / 13 | Steady |
| Socialist People's Party | G–EFA | 2 / 13 | ▲1 |
| People's Party | EFD | 2 / 13 | ▲1 |
| Conservative People's Party | EPP | 1 / 13 | Steady |
| People's Movement against the EU | EUL–NGL | 1 / 13 | Steady |

== Sources ==
- List of Danish MEPs (in Danish)
