= List of members of the European Parliament for Denmark, 2004–2009 =

Members of the European Parliament for Denmark
Delegation	(1973)
1st term	(1979)
2nd term	(1984)
3rd term	(1989)
4th term	(1994)
5th term	(1999)
6th term	(2004)
7th term	(2009)
8th term	(2014)
9th term	(2019)
10th term	(2024)

This is a list of the 14 members of the European Parliament for Denmark in the 2004 to 2009 session.

== List ==
Name	National party	EP Group	Votes
Margrete Auken	Socialist People's Party	G–EFA	73,747
Jens-Peter Bonde	June Movement	IND&DEM	75,363
Niels Busk	Left, Liberal Party	ALDE	44,575
Mogens Camre	People's Party	UEN	53,766
Ole Christensen	Social Democrats	PES	10,534
Anne Jensen	Left, Liberal Party	ALDE	42,914
Dan Jørgensen	Social Democrats	PES	10,350
Ole Krarup	People's Movement against the EU	EUL–NGL	34,743
Henrik Kristensen	Social Democrats	PES	91,232
Poul Rasmussen	Social Democrats	PES	407,966
Karin Riis-Jørgensen	Left, Liberal Party	ALDE	91,348
Anders Samuelsen	Social Liberal Party	ALDE	60,458
Gitte Seeberg	Conservative People's Party (2004–2009); Liberal Alliance	EPP–ED	125,460
Britta Thomsen	Social Democrats	PES	12,756

=== Party representation ===
National party	EP Group	Seats	±
Social Democrats	PES	5 / 14	▲2
Left, Liberal Party	ALDE	3 / 14	▼2
Conservative People's Party	EPP–ED	1 / 14	Steady
June Movement	IND&DEM	1 / 14	▼2
Socialist People's Party	G–EFA	1 / 14	Steady
People's Party	EFD	1 / 14	Steady
Social Liberal Party	ALDE	1 / 14	Steady
People's Movement against the EU	EUL–NGL	1 / 14	Steady
