= Sønderborg (nomination district) =

- Sønderborg
- Nomination district constituency for the Folketing
- Location of Sønderborg within South Jutland

- Location of South Jutland within Denmark
- Municipalities: Sønderborg
- Constituency: South Jutland
- Electorate: 53,712 (2022)

Current constituency
- Created: 1920

Sønderborg nominating district is one of the 92 nominating districts that exists for Danish elections following the 2007 municipal reform. It consists of Sønderborg municipality. It was created in 1920 following its reunification with Denmark, though its boundaries have been changed since then.

In general elections, parties commonly associated with the blue bloc tends to get a little more votes.

== General elections results ==
=== General elections in the 2020s ===
2022 Danish general election

Parties	Vote		
Parties	Votes	%	+ / -
Social Democrats	14,548	33.54	+3.53
Venstre	6,607	15.23	-12.67
Denmark Democrats	4,918	11.34	New
Moderates	3,660	8.44	New
New Right	3,039	7.01	+2.22
Liberal Alliance	2,798	6.45	+4.80
Green Left	2,023	4.66	+0.43
Conservatives	1,636	3.77	-0.80
Danish People's Party	1,266	2.92	-9.36
Red–Green Alliance	967	2.23	-0.98
Social Liberals	932	2.15	-3.58
The Alternative	537	1.24	-0.26
Christian Democrats	210	0.48	-0.80
Independent Greens	206	0.47	New
Kent Nielsen	24	0.06	New
Kenneth Vestergaard	5	0.01	New
Total	43,376		

=== General elections in the 2010s ===
2019 Danish general election

Parties	Vote		
Parties	Votes	%	+ / -
Social Democrats	13,470	30.01	+4.73
Venstre	12,521	27.90	+6.36
Danish People's Party	5,511	12.28	-18.16
Social Liberals	2,572	5.73	+1.46
New Right	2,151	4.79	New
Conservatives	2,049	4.57	+2.81
Green Left	1,897	4.23	+1.80
Red–Green Alliance	1,440	3.21	-1.06
Stram Kurs	918	2.05	New
Liberal Alliance	739	1.65	-5.59
The Alternative	671	1.50	-0.75
Christian Democrats	574	1.28	+0.76
Klaus Riskær Pedersen Party	281	0.63	New
Michael Thomsen	84	0.19	New
Total	44,878		

2015 Danish general election

Parties	Vote		
Parties	Votes	%	+ / -
Danish People's Party	14,124	30.44	+15.01
Social Democrats	11,728	25.28	-2.12
Venstre	9,994	21.54	-9.55
Liberal Alliance	3,357	7.24	+2.87
Social Liberals	1,983	4.27	-1.60
Red–Green Alliance	1,981	4.27	+1.18
Green Left	1,129	2.43	-4.67
The Alternative	1,042	2.25	New
Conservatives	818	1.76	-3.33
Christian Democrats	240	0.52	-0.01
Total	46,396		

2011 Danish general election

Parties	Vote		
Parties	Votes	%	+ / -
Venstre	14,770	31.09	-2.39
Social Democrats	13,017	27.40	+1.76
Danish People's Party	7,329	15.43	-2.73
Green Left	3,374	7.10	-2.39
Social Liberals	2,790	5.87	+2.83
Conservatives	2,416	5.09	-2.06
Liberal Alliance	2,077	4.37	+2.56
Red–Green Alliance	1,467	3.09	+2.37
Christian Democrats	251	0.53	+0.01
Jørn Bjorholm	12	0.03	New
Niesl-Aage Bjerre	6	0.01	New
Total	47,509		

=== General elections in the 2000s ===
2007 Danish general election

Parties	Vote		
Parties	Votes	%	+ / -
Venstre	16,128	33.48	+1.32
Social Democrats	12,353	25.64	-2.00
Danish People's Party	8,746	18.16	+1.29
Green Left	4,572	9.49	+5.54
Conservatives	3,442	7.15	-1.69
Social Liberals	1,464	3.04	-3.25
New Alliance	870	1.81	New
Red–Green Alliance	347	0.72	-0.97
Christian Democrats	250	0.52	-1.09
Total	48,172		

2005 Danish general election

Parties	Vote		
Parties	Votes	%	+ / -
Venstre	8,645	32.16	-0.14
Social Democrats	7,429	27.64	-3.32
Danish People's Party	4,536	16.87	+0.97
Conservatives	2,377	8.84	+0.69
Social Liberals	1,690	6.29	+2.30
Green Left	1,062	3.95	+0.16
Red–Green Alliance	454	1.69	+0.72
Christian Democrats	432	1.61	-0.28
Centre Democrats	196	0.73	-0.51
Minority Party	61	0.23	New
Total	26,882		

2001 Danish general election

Parties	Vote		
Parties	Votes	%	+ / -
Venstre	8,958	32.30	+6.13
Social Democrats	8,584	30.96	-7.74
Danish People's Party	4,409	15.90	+6.65
Conservatives	2,260	8.15	+0.04
Social Liberals	1,107	3.99	+0.97
Green Left	1,050	3.79	-1.37
Christian People's Party	523	1.89	-0.35
Centre Democrats	345	1.24	-2.52
Red–Green Alliance	268	0.97	-0.07
Progress Party	226	0.82	-1.17
Total	27,730		

=== General elections in the 1990s ===
1998 Danish general election

Parties	Vote		
Parties	Votes	%	+ / -
Social Democrats	10,700	38.70	+0.62
Venstre	7,237	26.17	+2.58
Danish People's Party	2,559	9.25	New
Conservatives	2,242	8.11	-8.64
Green Left	1,426	5.16	+0.62
Centre Democrats	1,040	3.76	+1.61
Social Liberals	834	3.02	-0.58
Christian People's Party	619	2.24	+0.61
Progress Party	550	1.99	-5.92
Red–Green Alliance	287	1.04	-0.66
Democratic Renewal	151	0.55	New
Leon Elmkjær	5	0.02	-0.02
Total	27,650		

1994 Danish general election

Parties	Vote		
Parties	Votes	%	+ / -
Social Democrats	10,310	38.08	-2.29
Venstre	6,388	23.59	+8.71
Conservatives	4,536	16.75	-2.56
Progress Party	2,143	7.91	-0.37
Green Left	1,229	4.54	-0.20
Social Liberals	976	3.60	+0.85
Centre Democrats	582	2.15	-2.06
Red–Green Alliance	459	1.70	+1.00
Christian People's Party	441	1.63	-0.21
Leon Elmkjær	12	0.04	New
Total	27,076		

1990 Danish general election

Parties	Vote		
Parties	Votes	%	+ / -
Social Democrats	10,583	40.37	+6.47
Conservatives	5,062	19.31	-3.70
Venstre	3,902	14.88	+4.59
Progress Party	2,171	8.28	-2.05
Green Left	1,242	4.74	-3.55
Centre Democrats	1,103	4.21	+0.20
Social Liberals	722	2.75	-2.19
Christian People's Party	482	1.84	+0.17
Common Course	329	1.25	-0.49
The Greens	230	0.88	-0.33
Justice Party of Denmark	208	0.79	New
Red–Green Alliance	183	0.70	New
Total	26,217		

=== General elections in the 1980s ===
1988 Danish general election

Parties	Vote		
Parties	Votes	%	+ / -
Social Democrats	9,093	33.90	-0.07
Conservatives	6,172	23.01	-2.70
Progress Party	2,770	10.33	+4.51
Venstre	2,759	10.29	+2.01
Green Left	2,223	8.29	-1.93
Social Liberals	1,325	4.94	-0.52
Centre Democrats	1,076	4.01	+0.33
Common Course	466	1.74	-0.05
Christian People's Party	449	1.67	-0.35
The Greens	325	1.21	-0.20
Communist Party of Denmark	110	0.41	-0.05
Left Socialists	56	0.21	-0.24
Total	26,824		

1987 Danish general election

Parties	Vote		
Parties	Votes	%	+ / -
Social Democrats	9,128	33.97	-2.24
Conservatives	6,908	25.71	-3.38
Green Left	2,745	10.22	+2.58
Venstre	2,226	8.28	-0.86
Progress Party	1,565	5.82	+1.66
Social Liberals	1,468	5.46	+1.00
Centre Democrats	988	3.68	-0.42
Christian People's Party	542	2.02	-0.31
Common Course	482	1.79	New
The Greens	378	1.41	New
Justice Party of Denmark	143	0.53	-0.83
Communist Party of Denmark	124	0.46	+0.14
Left Socialists	122	0.45	-0.64
Humanist Party	27	0.10	New
Socialist Workers Party	19	0.07	-0.01
Marxist–Leninists Party	5	0.02	-0.01
Total	26,870		

1984 Danish general election

Parties	Vote		
Parties	Votes	%	+ / -
Social Democrats	9,614	36.21	-3.61
Conservatives	7,722	29.09	+11.90
Venstre	2,427	9.14	+0.29
Green Left	2,027	7.64	+0.32
Social Liberals	1,185	4.46	+0.20
Progress Party	1,104	4.16	-6.21
Centre Democrats	1,088	4.10	-3.06
Christian People's Party	619	2.33	+0.47
Justice Party of Denmark	360	1.36	-0.24
Left Socialists	290	1.09	+0.20
Communist Party of Denmark	85	0.32	-0.12
Socialist Workers Party	20	0.08	-0.05
Marxist–Leninists Party	7	0.03	New
Total	26,548		

1981 Danish general election

Parties	Vote		
Parties	Votes	%	+ / -
Social Democrats	9,900	39.82	-5.28
Conservatives	4,275	17.19	+3.52
Progress Party	2,577	10.37	-3.23
Venstre	2,201	8.85	-1.11
Green Left	1,820	7.32	+3.62
Centre Democrats	1,779	7.16	+4.28
Social Liberals	1,059	4.26	+0.46
Christian People's Party	462	1.86	-0.46
Justice Party of Denmark	397	1.60	-0.95
Left Socialists	221	0.89	-0.40
Communist Party of Denmark	110	0.44	-0.52
Socialist Workers Party	32	0.13	New
Communist Workers Party	29	0.12	-0.04
Total	24,862		

=== General elections in the 1970s ===
1979 Danish general election

Parties	Vote		
Parties	Votes	%	+ / -
Social Democrats	11,061	45.10	+3.91
Conservatives	3,352	13.67	+4.24
Progress Party	3,336	13.60	-4.12
Venstre	2,443	9.96	+1.06
Social Liberals	932	3.80	+1.13
Green Left	907	3.70	+1.39
Centre Democrats	706	2.88	-4.59
Justice Party of Denmark	626	2.55	-0.94
Christian People's Party	570	2.32	-0.95
Left Socialists	317	1.29	+0.36
Communist Party of Denmark	235	0.96	-0.75
Communist Workers Party	39	0.16	New
Total	24,524		

1977 Danish general election

Parties	Vote		
Parties	Votes	%	+ / -
Social Democrats	10,161	41.19	+6.14
Progress Party	4,372	17.72	+0.73
Conservatives	2,326	9.43	+2.97
Venstre	2,196	8.90	-11.31
Centre Democrats	1,843	7.47	+3.49
Justice Party of Denmark	862	3.49	+1.66
Christian People's Party	806	3.27	-1.27
Social Liberals	659	2.67	-3.02
Green Left	570	2.31	-0.37
Communist Party of Denmark	423	1.71	-0.12
Left Socialists	230	0.93	+0.23
Pensioners' Party	218	0.88	New
Total	24,666		

1975 Danish general election

Parties	Vote		
Parties	Votes	%	+ / -
Social Democrats	8,543	35.05	+3.06
Venstre	4,925	20.21	+12.74
Progress Party	4,142	16.99	-1.39
Conservatives	1,574	6.46	-5.66
Social Liberals	1,388	5.69	-4.72
Christian People's Party	1,106	4.54	+0.78
Centre Democrats	969	3.98	-3.30
Green Left	653	2.68	-0.94
Justice Party of Denmark	446	1.83	-1.18
Communist Party of Denmark	446	1.83	+0.54
Left Socialists	171	0.70	+0.14
Marinus Roth	11	0.05	-0.06
Total	24,374		

1973 Danish general election

Parties	Vote		
Parties	Votes	%	+ / -
Social Democrats	7,760	31.99	-13.32
Progress Party	4,458	18.38	New
Conservatives	2,939	12.12	-9.08
Social Liberals	2,526	10.41	-1.04
Venstre	1,813	7.47	-0.69
Centre Democrats	1,767	7.28	New
Christian People's Party	913	3.76	+2.13
Green Left	877	3.62	-1.84
Justice Party of Denmark	731	3.01	+1.49
Communist Party of Denmark	314	1.29	+0.97
Left Socialists	135	0.56	-0.06
Marinus Roth	26	0.11	+0.08
Total	24,259		

1971 Danish general election

Parties	Vote		
Parties	Votes	%	+ / -
Social Democrats	10,601	45.31	-1.10
Conservatives	4,959	21.20	-4.01
Social Liberals	2,678	11.45	+0.42
Venstre	1,910	8.16	+2.27
Green Left	1,277	5.46	+2.30
Schleswig Party	1,007	4.30	-0.86
Christian People's Party	382	1.63	New
Justice Party of Denmark	356	1.52	+0.89
Left Socialists	144	0.62	+0.27
Communist Party of Denmark	76	0.32	-0.11
Marinus Roth	6	0.03	New
Total	23,396		

=== General elections in the 1960s ===
1968 Danish general election

Parties	Vote		
Parties	Votes	%	+ / -
Social Democrats	10,015	46.41	-5.49
Conservatives	5,441	25.21	+0.72
Social Liberals	2,380	11.03	+7.01
Venstre	1,270	5.89	-4.51
Schleswig Party	1,114	5.16	New
Green Left	681	3.16	-1.22
Liberal Centre	297	1.38	-1.10
Justice Party of Denmark	136	0.63	+0.01
Communist Party of Denmark	93	0.43	+0.18
Independent Party	76	0.35	-1.11
Left Socialists	76	0.35	New
Total	21,579		

1966 Danish general election

Parties	Vote		
Parties	Votes	%	+ / -
Social Democrats	11,374	51.90	+2.49
Conservatives	5,368	24.49	-0.20
Venstre	2,279	10.40	+0.93
Green Left	959	4.38	+2.20
Social Liberals	882	4.02	+1.43
Liberal Centre	543	2.48	New
Independent Party	320	1.46	-0.59
Justice Party of Denmark	136	0.62	-0.49
Communist Party of Denmark	55	0.25	-0.16
Total	21,916		

1964 Danish general election

Parties	Vote		
Parties	Votes	%	+ / -
Social Democrats	10,216	49.41	-0.44
Conservatives	5,104	24.69	+3.58
Venstre	1,959	9.47	-0.64
Schleswig Party	1,566	7.57	-1.06
Social Liberals	535	2.59	-0.32
Green Left	450	2.18	-0.11
Independent Party	423	2.05	-0.87
Justice Party of Denmark	229	1.11	-0.55
Danish Unity	109	0.53	New
Communist Party of Denmark	85	0.41	-0.11
Total	20,676		

1960 Danish general election

Parties	Vote		
Parties	Votes	%	+ / -
Social Democrats	8,726	49.85	+4.79
Conservatives	3,695	21.11	+1.22
Venstre	1,770	10.11	-2.26
Schleswig Party	1,510	8.63	-1.33
Independent Party	511	2.92	+1.04
Social Liberals	509	2.91	-1.51
Green Left	401	2.29	New
Justice Party of Denmark	290	1.66	-3.11
Communist Party of Denmark	91	0.52	-1.14
Total	17,503		

=== General elections in the 1950s ===
1957 Danish general election

Parties	Vote		
Parties	Votes	%	+ / -
Social Democrats	7,376	45.06	-1.73
Conservatives	3,255	19.89	-1.45
Venstre	2,025	12.37	+1.74
Schleswig Party	1,631	9.96	New
Justice Party of Denmark	781	4.77	+1.67
Social Liberals	723	4.42	+0.43
Independent Party	307	1.88	+0.69
Communist Party of Denmark	271	1.66	-0.35
Total	16,369		

September 1953 Danish Folketing election

Parties	Vote		
Parties	Votes	%	+ / -
Social Democrats	7,208	46.79	+0.51
Conservatives	3,287	21.34	-0.56
Hans Schmidt	1,686	10.95	+0.46
Venstre	1,637	10.63	+0.96
Social Liberals	615	3.99	+0.19
Justice Party of Denmark	478	3.10	-1.54
Communist Party of Denmark	310	2.01	-0.22
Independent Party	183	1.19	New
Total	15,404		

April 1953 Danish Folketing election

Parties	Vote		
Parties	Votes	%	+ / -
Social Democrats	6,818	46.28	-1.19
Conservatives	3,226	21.90	-1.12
Hans Schmidt	1,546	10.49	+2.45
Venstre	1,424	9.67	+1.12
Justice Party of Denmark	684	4.64	-2.22
Social Liberals	560	3.80	+0.57
Communist Party of Denmark	328	2.23	-0.61
Danish Unity	145	0.98	New
Total	14,731		

1950 Danish Folketing election

Parties	Vote		
Parties	Votes	%	+ / -
Social Democrats	6,763	47.47	+1.09
Conservatives	3,280	23.02	+6.91
Venstre	1,218	8.55	-2.79
Hans Schmidt	1,145	8.04	New
Justice Party of Denmark	978	6.86	+3.56
Social Liberals	460	3.23	+1.06
Communist Party of Denmark	404	2.84	-1.28
Total	14,248		

=== General elections in the 1940s ===
1947 Danish Folketing election

Parties	Vote		
Parties	Votes	%	+ / -
Social Democrats	6,587	46.38	-2.69
Conservatives	2,288	16.11	-8.08
Venstre	1,611	11.34	-4.65
W. Reuter	1,532	10.79	New
J. Christmas Møller	590	4.15	New
Communist Party of Denmark	585	4.12	-2.23
Justice Party of Denmark	468	3.30	+1.86
Social Liberals	308	2.17	-0.78
Danish Unity	232	1.63	+1.63
Total	14,201		

1945 Danish Folketing election

Parties	Vote		
Parties	Votes	%	+ / -
Social Democrats	6,230	49.07	-5.10
Conservatives	3,071	24.19	-0.92
Venstre	2,030	15.99	+7.97
Communist Party of Denmark	806	6.35	New
Social Liberals	375	2.95	+0.14
Justice Party of Denmark	183	1.44	+0.35
Danish Unity	0	0.00	-1.92
Total	12,695		

1943 Danish Folketing election

Parties	Vote		
Parties	Votes	%	+ / -
Social Democrats	6,528	54.17	+10.55
Conservatives	3,026	25.11	+3.69
Venstre	966	8.02	+0.57
National Socialist Workers' Party of Denmark	776	6.44	+2.49
Social Liberals	339	2.81	-0.12
Danish Unity	231	1.92	New
Justice Party of Denmark	131	1.09	+0.16
Farmers' Party	54	0.45	New
Total	12,051		

=== General elections in the 1930s ===
1939 Danish Folketing election

Parties	Vote		
Parties	Votes	%	+ / -
Social Democrats	5,940	43.62	-0.20
Conservatives	2,917	21.42	+0.33
Schleswig Party	2,572	18.89	+1.50
Venstre	1,014	7.45	+0.83
National Socialist Workers' Party of Denmark	538	3.95	+1.08
Social Liberals	399	2.93	+0.10
Justice Party of Denmark	126	0.93	-0.69
National Cooperation	112	0.82	New
Total	13,618		

1935 Danish Folketing election

Parties	Vote		
Parties	Votes	%	+ / -
Social Democrats	5,232	43.82	+0.84
Conservatives	2,518	21.09	-3.93
Schleswig Party	2,076	17.39	+2.27
Venstre	790	6.62	-2.18
National Socialist Workers' Party of Denmark	343	2.87	New
Social Liberals	338	2.83	-0.41
Communist Party of Denmark	235	1.97	-1.08
Independent People's Party	197	1.65	New
Justice Party of Denmark	194	1.62	-0.18
Society Party	16	0.13	New
Total	11,939		

1932 Danish Folketing election

Parties	Vote		
Parties	Votes	%	+ / -
Social Democrats	4,500	42.98	+0.58
Conservatives	2,620	25.02	+8.44
Schleswig Party	1,583	15.12	-1.14
Venstre	921	8.80	-8.09
Social Liberals	339	3.24	-1.41
Communist Party of Denmark	319	3.05	+1.60
Justice Party of Denmark	188	1.80	+0.03
Total	10,470		

=== General elections in the 1920s ===
1929 Danish Folketing election

Parties	Vote		
Parties	Votes	%	+ / -
Social Democrats	4,121	42.40	+4.77
Venstre	1,642	16.89	+1.45
Conservatives	1,612	16.58	-2.68
Schleswig Party	1,580	16.26	-2.34
Social Liberals	452	4.65	-0.28
Justice Party of Denmark	172	1.77	+1.12
Communist Party of Denmark	141	1.45	+0.59
Total	9,720		

1926 Danish Folketing election

Parties	Vote		
Parties	Votes	%	+ / -
Social Democrats	3,659	37.63	+1.47
Conservatives	1,873	19.26	+0.73
Schleswig Party	1,809	18.60	+3.02
Venstre	1,501	15.44	-0.20
Social Liberals	479	4.93	-5.71
Independence Party	256	2.63	New
Communist Party of Denmark	84	0.86	New
Justice Party of Denmark	63	0.65	+0.53
Total	9,724		

1924 Danish Folketing election

Parties	Vote		
Parties	Votes	%	+ / -
Social Democrats	3,015	36.16	+10.10
Conservatives	1,545	18.53	+5.34
Venstre	1,304	15.64	-17.70
Schleswig Party	1,299	15.58	-3.84
Social Liberals	887	10.64	+6.84
Farmer Party	278	3.33	New
Justice Party of Denmark	10	0.12	New
Total	8,338		

September 1920 Danish Folketing election

Parties	Vote		
Parties	Votes	%	+ / -
Venstre	2,134	33.34	
Social Democrats	1,668	26.06	
Schleswig Party	1,243	19.42	
Conservatives	844	13.19	
Social Liberals	243	3.80	
Industry Party	145	2.27	
Danish Left Socialist Party	124	1.94	
Total	6,401		

== European Parliament elections results ==
2024 European Parliament election in Denmark

Parties	Vote		
Parties	Votes	%	+ / -
Social Democrats	5,662	20.03	-5.45
Venstre	5,578	19.74	-5.56
Green Left	3,244	11.48	+3.52
Denmark Democrats	2,961	10.48	New
Danish People's Party	2,503	8.86	-7.88
Conservatives	2,154	7.62	+2.66
Liberal Alliance	1,938	6.86	+3.64
Moderates	1,625	5.75	New
Social Liberals	1,214	4.30	-3.35
Red–Green Alliance	971	3.44	+0.44
The Alternative	411	1.45	-0.58
Total	28,261		

2019 European Parliament election in Denmark

Parties	Vote		
Parties	Votes	%	+ / -
Social Democrats	8,743	25.48	+5.18
Venstre	8,680	25.30	+5.34
Danish People's Party	5,743	16.74	-17.17
Green Left	2,730	7.96	+2.28
Social Liberals	2,624	7.65	+3.76
Conservatives	1,701	4.96	-3.52
People's Movement against the EU	1,258	3.67	-1.68
Liberal Alliance	1,106	3.22	+0.79
Red–Green Alliance	1,028	3.00	New
The Alternative	697	2.03	New
Total	34,310		

2014 European Parliament election in Denmark

Parties	Vote		
Parties	Votes	%	+ / -
Danish People's Party	10,119	33.91	+13.33
Social Democrats	6,057	20.30	-2.55
Venstre	5,957	19.96	-3.34
Conservatives	2,532	8.48	-3.45
Green Left	1,694	5.68	-4.84
People's Movement against the EU	1,598	5.35	+0.04
Social Liberals	1,162	3.89	+0.93
Liberal Alliance	725	2.43	+1.88
Total	29,844		

2009 European Parliament election in Denmark

Parties	Vote		
Parties	Votes	%	+ / -
Venstre	7,422	23.30	+3.50
Social Democrats	7,279	22.85	-15.20
Danish People's Party	6,557	20.58	+12.01
Conservatives	3,800	11.93	+0.70
Green Left	3,351	10.52	+5.73
People's Movement against the EU	1,692	5.31	+1.49
Social Liberals	942	2.96	-1.17
June Movement	636	2.00	-6.60
Liberal Alliance	175	0.55	New
Total	31,854		

2004 European Parliament election in Denmark

Parties	Vote		
Parties	Votes	%	+ / -
Social Democrats	5,622	38.05	+21.14
Venstre	2,925	19.80	-3.01
Conservatives	1,659	11.23	-0.78
June Movement	1,270	8.60	-6.54
Danish People's Party	1,266	8.57	+0.70
Green Left	708	4.79	+0.10
Social Liberals	610	4.13	-4.47
People's Movement against the EU	565	3.82	-3.13
Christian Democrats	150	1.02	-0.86
Total	14,775		

1999 European Parliament election in Denmark

Parties	Vote		
Parties	Votes	%	+ / -
Venstre	3,467	22.81	+4.03
Social Democrats	2,571	16.91	-1.82
June Movement	2,301	15.14	+2.56
Conservatives	1,826	12.01	-10.67
Social Liberals	1,308	8.60	+2.66
Danish People's Party	1,196	7.87	New
People's Movement against the EU	1,057	6.95	-4.27
Green Left	713	4.69	-0.77
Centre Democrats	477	3.14	+2.45
Christian Democrats	286	1.88	+0.96
Progress Party	202	1.33	-1.66
Total	15,202		

1994 European Parliament election in Denmark

Parties	Vote		
Parties	Votes	%	+ / -
Conservatives	3,824	22.68	+5.85
Venstre	3,166	18.78	+3.57
Social Democrats	3,158	18.73	-8.95
June Movement	2,121	12.58	New
People's Movement against the EU	1,891	11.22	-5.08
Social Liberals	1,002	5.94	+3.59
Green Left	920	5.46	+0.33
Progress Party	504	2.99	-3.77
Christian Democrats	155	0.92	-1.47
Centre Democrats	116	0.69	-6.65
Total	16,857		

1989 European Parliament election in Denmark

Parties	Vote		
Parties	Votes	%	+ / -
Social Democrats	3,879	27.68	+2.31
Conservatives	2,359	16.83	-10.17
People's Movement against the EU	2,285	16.30	-1.82
Venstre	2,132	15.21	+6.84
Centre Democrats	1,029	7.34	+0.37
Progress Party	948	6.76	+3.31
Green Left	719	5.13	-0.01
Christian Democrats	335	2.39	+0.01
Social Liberals	330	2.35	-0.40
Total	14,016		

1984 European Parliament election in Denmark

Parties	Vote	
Parties	Votes	%
Conservatives	4,190	27.00
Social Democrats	3,936	25.37
People's Movement against the EU	2,812	18.12
Venstre	1,299	8.37
Centre Democrats	1,082	6.97
Green Left	798	5.14
Progress Party	535	3.45
Social Liberals	426	2.75
Christian Democrats	369	2.38
Left Socialists	69	0.44
Total	15,516	

== Referendums ==
2022 Danish European Union opt-out referendum

Option	Votes	%
✓ YES	22,352	63.49
X NO	12,853	36.51

2015 Danish European Union opt-out referendum

Option	Votes	%
X NO	21,904	55.60
✓ YES	17,489	44.40

2014 Danish Unified Patent Court membership referendum

Option	Votes	%
✓ YES	19,223	65.59
X NO	10,084	34.41

2009 Danish Act of Succession referendum

Option	Votes	%
✓ YES	25,617	84.53
X NO	4,687	15.47

2000 Danish euro referendum

Option	Votes	%
X NO	14,400	51.19
✓ YES	13,729	48.81

1998 Danish Amsterdam Treaty referendum

Option	Votes	%
✓ YES	14,029	55.37
X NO	11,310	44.63

1993 Danish Maastricht Treaty referendum

Option	Votes	%
✓ YES	16,836	60.03
X NO	11,209	39.97

1992 Danish Maastricht Treaty referendum

Option	Votes	%
✓ YES	13,962	52.06
X NO	12,855	47.94

1986 Danish Single European Act referendum

Option	Votes	%
✓ YES	14,259	61.24
X NO	9,023	38.76

1972 Danish European Communities membership referendum

Option	Votes	%
✓ YES	17,545	70.87
X NO	7,212	29.13

1953 Danish constitutional and electoral age referendum

Option	Votes	%
✓ YES	9,630	86.52
X NO	1,500	13.48
23 years	5,928	51.91
21 years	5,492	48.09

1939 Danish constitutional referendum

Option	Votes	%
✓ YES	7,120	94.17
X NO	441	5.83
