= List of members of the European Parliament for Denmark, 2024–2029 =

Members of the European Parliament for Denmark
Delegation	(1973)
1st term	(1979)
2nd term	(1984)
3rd term	(1989)
4th term	(1994)
5th term	(1999)
6th term	(2004)
7th term	(2009)
8th term	(2014)
9th term	(2019)
10th term	(2024)

This is a list of the 15 members of the European Parliament for Denmark in the 2024 to 2029 session elected on June 9, 2024.

== List ==
Name	National party	EP Group	Preference votes
Christel Schaldemose	Social Democrats (S)	S&D	142,198
Niels Fuglsang	Social Democrats (S)	S&D	29,135
Marianne Vind	Social Democrats (S)	S&D	28,267
Sigrid Friis	Social Liberal Party (RV)	RE	63,093
Niels Flemming Hansen	Conservative People's Party (KF)	EPP	33,147
Kira Marie Peter-Hansen	Socialist People's Party (SF)	Greens/EFA	178,438
Villy Søvndal	Socialist People's Party (SF)	Greens/EFA	60,510
Rasmus Nordqvis	Socialist People's Party (SF)	Greens/EFA	11,525
Henrik Dahl	Liberal Alliance (LA)	EPP	65,502
Stine Bosse	Moderaterne (M)	RE	86,888
Anders Vistisen	Danish People's Party (DF)	PfE	55,082
Morten Løkkegaard	Venstre (V)	RE	174,048
Asger Christensen	Venstre (V)	RE	47,088
Kristoffer Storm	Denmark Democrats (DD)	ECR	73,493
Per Clausen	Red–Green Alliance (Ø)	GUE/NGL	32,670

== Members who joined later ==
- Majbritt Birkholm (2026)
