= Fredericia (nomination district) =

- Fredericia
- Nomination district constituency for the Folketing
- Location of Fredericia within South Jutland

- Location of South Jutland within Denmark
- Municipalities: Fredericia
- Constituency: South Jutland
- Electorate: 38,502 (2022)

Current constituency
- Created: 1849 (as constituency); 1920 (as nomination district)

Fredericia nominating district is one of the 92 nominating districts that exits for Danish elections following the 2007 municipal reform. It consists of Fredericia Municipality. It was created in 1849 as a constituency, and has been a nomination district since 1920, though its boundaries have been changed since then.

In general elections, the district has usually voted a little bit more for parties of the blue bloc.

== General elections results ==
=== General elections in the 2020s ===
2022 Danish general election

Parties	Vote		
Parties	Votes	%	+ / -
Social Democrats	10,317	33.59	+2.96
Venstre	3,438	11.20	-10.48
Moderates	3,111	10.13	New
Denmark Democrats	2,877	9.37	New
Liberal Alliance	2,417	7.87	+5.87
Green Left	2,050	6.68	+0.96
New Right	1,638	5.33	+1.74
Conservatives	1,443	4.70	-1.06
Red–Green Alliance	1,010	3.29	-2.20
Danish People's Party	881	2.87	-9.77
Social Liberals	652	2.12	-3.68
The Alternative	546	1.78	-0.13
Christian Democrats	197	0.64	-1.17
Independent Greens	108	0.35	New
Kent Nielsen	23	0.07	New
Kenneth Vestergaard	2	0.01	New
Total	30,710		

=== General elections in the 2010s ===
2019 Danish general election

Parties	Vote		
Parties	Votes	%	+ / -
Social Democrats	9,432	30.63	+2.60
Venstre	6,675	21.68	+4.16
Danish People's Party	3,891	12.64	-17.18
Social Liberals	1,785	5.80	+3.27
Conservatives	1,774	5.76	+3.71
Green Left	1,762	5.72	+2.34
Red–Green Alliance	1,691	5.49	-0.63
New Right	1,105	3.59	New
Liberal Alliance	617	2.00	-4.65
Stram Kurs	595	1.93	New
The Alternative	588	1.91	-1.18
Christian Democrats	556	1.81	+0.99
Klaus Riskær Pedersen Party	302	0.98	New
Michael Thomsen	17	0.06	New
Total	30,790		

2015 Danish general election

Parties	Vote		
Parties	Votes	%	+ / -
Danish People's Party	9,312	29.82	+14.66
Social Democrats	8,755	28.03	-2.40
Venstre	5,471	17.52	-9.22
Liberal Alliance	2,077	6.65	+2.30
Red–Green Alliance	1,911	6.12	+1.64
Green Left	1,057	3.38	-4.51
The Alternative	965	3.09	New
Social Liberals	789	2.53	-3.64
Conservatives	639	2.05	-1.82
Christian Democrats	256	0.82	-0.06
Total	31,232		

2011 Danish general election

Parties	Vote		
Parties	Votes	%	+ / -
Social Democrats	9,753	30.43	+3.83
Venstre	8,570	26.74	-0.24
Danish People's Party	4,858	15.16	-1.26
Green Left	2,530	7.89	-5.97
Social Liberals	1,978	6.17	+3.07
Red–Green Alliance	1,436	4.48	+3.60
Liberal Alliance	1,395	4.35	+2.37
Conservatives	1,242	3.87	-5.40
Christian Democrats	281	0.88	-0.02
Niesl-Aage Bjerre	5	0.02	New
Jørn Bjorholm	5	0.02	New
Total	32,053		

=== General elections in the 2000s ===
2007 Danish general election

Parties	Vote		
Parties	Votes	%	+ / -
Venstre	8,350	26.98	-2.50
Social Democrats	8,234	26.60	-1.27
Danish People's Party	5,082	16.42	+1.04
Green Left	4,291	13.86	+7.67
Conservatives	2,868	9.27	+0.61
Social Liberals	961	3.10	-3.68
New Alliance	614	1.98	New
Christian Democrats	279	0.90	-1.57
Red–Green Alliance	272	0.88	-1.32
Total	30,951		

2005 Danish general election

Parties	Vote		
Parties	Votes	%	+ / -
Venstre	10,925	29.47	-0.72
Social Democrats	10,328	27.86	-5.13
Danish People's Party	5,699	15.37	+1.27
Conservatives	3,209	8.66	+0.85
Social Liberals	2,512	6.78	+3.49
Green Left	2,294	6.19	+0.42
Christian Democrats	916	2.47	-0.25
Red–Green Alliance	814	2.20	+1.01
Centre Democrats	291	0.78	-0.48
Minority Party	70	0.19	New
Benjamin Blender	15	0.04	+0.01
Total	37,073		

2001 Danish general election

Parties	Vote		
Parties	Votes	%	+ / -
Social Democrats	12,495	32.99	-8.11
Venstre	11,436	30.19	+6.59
Danish People's Party	5,341	14.10	+5.80
Conservatives	2,957	7.81	+1.14
Green Left	2,186	5.77	-1.49
Social Liberals	1,245	3.29	+0.44
Christian People's Party	1,030	2.72	-0.18
Centre Democrats	479	1.26	-2.58
Red–Green Alliance	452	1.19	-0.26
Progress Party	242	0.64	-1.11
Benjamin Blender	11	0.03	New
Total	37,874		

=== General elections in the 1990s ===
1998 Danish general election

Parties	Vote		
Parties	Votes	%	+ / -
Social Democrats	15,309	41.10	+2.35
Venstre	8,792	23.60	+0.53
Danish People's Party	3,091	8.30	New
Green Left	2,704	7.26	-0.60
Conservatives	2,486	6.67	-6.94
Centre Democrats	1,429	3.84	+1.34
Christian People's Party	1,079	2.90	+0.63
Social Liberals	1,061	2.85	-0.79
Progress Party	652	1.75	-4.88
Red–Green Alliance	539	1.45	-0.13
Democratic Renewal	94	0.25	New
Birgitte Bjerring Sonneby	16	0.04	New
Total	37,252		

1994 Danish general election

Parties	Vote		
Parties	Votes	%	+ / -
Social Democrats	14,020	38.75	-4.14
Venstre	8,345	23.07	+9.35
Conservatives	4,924	13.61	-1.78
Green Left	2,843	7.86	+0.92
Progress Party	2,398	6.63	+0.12
Social Liberals	1,315	3.64	+1.19
Centre Democrats	905	2.50	-2.67
Christian People's Party	820	2.27	-0.77
Red–Green Alliance	573	1.58	+0.88
Knud Haugmark	33	0.09	New
Total	36,176		

1990 Danish general election

Parties	Vote		
Parties	Votes	%	+ / -
Social Democrats	15,061	42.89	+7.47
Conservatives	5,405	15.39	-3.63
Venstre	4,817	13.72	+3.59
Green Left	2,438	6.94	-4.67
Progress Party	2,287	6.51	-2.33
Centre Democrats	1,815	5.17	+0.60
Christian People's Party	1,069	3.04	+0.38
Social Liberals	861	2.45	-1.97
Common Course	674	1.92	+0.36
The Greens	262	0.75	-0.33
Red–Green Alliance	247	0.70	New
Justice Party of Denmark	177	0.50	New
Total	35,113		

=== General elections in the 1980s ===
1988 Danish general election

Parties	Vote		
Parties	Votes	%	+ / -
Social Democrats	12,774	35.42	-0.12
Conservatives	6,860	19.02	-1.33
Green Left	4,187	11.61	-1.86
Venstre	3,654	10.13	+1.21
Progress Party	3,188	8.84	+4.43
Centre Democrats	1,647	4.57	-0.14
Social Liberals	1,594	4.42	-0.36
Christian People's Party	960	2.66	-0.36
Common Course	562	1.56	-0.38
The Greens	389	1.08	+0.08
Communist Party of Denmark	168	0.47	-0.16
Left Socialists	80	0.22	-0.26
Total	36,063		

1987 Danish general election

Parties	Vote		
Parties	Votes	%	+ / -
Social Democrats	12,928	35.54	-0.64
Conservatives	7,404	20.35	-2.83
Green Left	4,899	13.47	+3.41
Venstre	3,244	8.92	-2.53
Social Liberals	1,740	4.78	+0.13
Centre Democrats	1,715	4.71	-0.34
Progress Party	1,606	4.41	+1.40
Christian People's Party	1,097	3.02	-0.06
Common Course	707	1.94	New
The Greens	363	1.00	New
Communist Party of Denmark	229	0.63	+0.12
Justice Party of Denmark	199	0.55	-1.05
Left Socialists	175	0.48	-0.67
Humanist Party	53	0.15	New
Socialist Workers Party	12	0.03	-0.01
Marxist–Leninists Party	6	0.02	0.00
Total	36,377		

1984 Danish general election

Parties	Vote		
Parties	Votes	%	+ / -
Social Democrats	13,102	36.18	-2.04
Conservatives	8,397	23.18	+9.26
Venstre	4,148	11.45	+1.38
Green Left	3,645	10.06	+0.02
Centre Democrats	1,829	5.05	-3.41
Social Liberals	1,684	4.65	+0.40
Christian People's Party	1,114	3.08	+0.41
Progress Party	1,090	3.01	-5.84
Justice Party of Denmark	580	1.60	+0.20
Left Socialists	417	1.15	+0.10
Communist Party of Denmark	184	0.51	-0.36
Socialist Workers Party	16	0.04	-0.01
Marxist–Leninists Party	7	0.02	New
A. Egedal Christoffersen	5	0.01	New
Total	36,218		

1981 Danish general election

Parties	Vote		
Parties	Votes	%	+ / -
Social Democrats	12,594	38.22	-5.87
Conservatives	4,587	13.92	+2.56
Venstre	3,318	10.07	-1.90
Green Left	3,309	10.04	+4.98
Progress Party	2,918	8.85	-1.00
Centre Democrats	2,787	8.46	+4.85
Social Liberals	1,402	4.25	-0.09
Christian People's Party	881	2.67	-0.62
Justice Party of Denmark	463	1.40	-1.32
Left Socialists	346	1.05	-0.79
Communist Party of Denmark	286	0.87	-0.70
Communist Workers Party	47	0.14	-0.17
Socialist Workers Party	16	0.05	New
Total	32,954		

=== General elections in the 1970s ===
1979 Danish general election

Parties	Vote		
Parties	Votes	%	+ / -
Social Democrats	14,732	44.09	+2.65
Venstre	4,000	11.97	-0.37
Conservatives	3,795	11.36	+4.03
Progress Party	3,293	9.85	-3.21
Green Left	1,690	5.06	+2.18
Social Liberals	1,449	4.34	+1.59
Centre Democrats	1,207	3.61	-2.95
Christian People's Party	1,101	3.29	-0.64
Justice Party of Denmark	908	2.72	-0.85
Left Socialists	615	1.84	+0.50
Communist Party of Denmark	523	1.57	-2.38
Communist Workers Party	104	0.31	New
Total	33,417		

1977 Danish general election

Parties	Vote		
Parties	Votes	%	+ / -
Social Democrats	13,381	41.44	+6.26
Progress Party	4,216	13.06	+1.53
Venstre	3,983	12.34	-11.54
Conservatives	2,366	7.33	+3.25
Centre Democrats	2,119	6.56	+4.12
Communist Party of Denmark	1,274	3.95	+0.21
Christian People's Party	1,268	3.93	-2.43
Justice Party of Denmark	1,152	3.57	+1.78
Green Left	931	2.88	-1.44
Social Liberals	888	2.75	-2.89
Left Socialists	433	1.34	+0.31
Pensioners' Party	278	0.86	New
Total	32,289		

1975 Danish general election

Parties	Vote		
Parties	Votes	%	+ / -
Social Democrats	11,215	35.18	+3.81
Venstre	7,612	23.88	+12.74
Progress Party	3,677	11.53	-3.18
Christian People's Party	2,029	6.36	+0.78
Social Liberals	1,797	5.64	-4.36
Green Left	1,376	4.32	-0.53
Conservatives	1,302	4.08	-3.97
Communist Party of Denmark	1,193	3.74	+1.27
Centre Democrats	777	2.44	-5.74
Justice Party of Denmark	570	1.79	-0.99
Left Socialists	328	1.03	+0.16
Erik Holm	4	0.01	New
Elin Høgsbro Appel	2	0.01	New
Total	31,882		

1973 Danish general election

Parties	Vote		
Parties	Votes	%	+ / -
Social Democrats	9,904	31.37	-14.81
Progress Party	4,646	14.71	New
Venstre	3,519	11.14	-4.52
Social Liberals	3,158	10.00	-2.08
Centre Democrats	2,583	8.18	New
Conservatives	2,542	8.05	-4.90
Christian People's Party	1,761	5.58	+3.14
Green Left	1,533	4.85	-2.63
Justice Party of Denmark	877	2.78	+1.34
Communist Party of Denmark	779	2.47	+1.38
Left Socialists	274	0.87	+0.20
Total	31,576		

1971 Danish general election

Parties	Vote		
Parties	Votes	%	+ / -
Social Democrats	13,708	46.18	+3.95
Venstre	4,649	15.66	-3.39
Conservatives	3,844	12.95	-4.47
Social Liberals	3,586	12.08	+0.52
Green Left	2,220	7.48	+1.81
Christian People's Party	725	2.44	New
Justice Party of Denmark	428	1.44	+0.65
Communist Party of Denmark	324	1.09	+0.36
Left Socialists	198	0.67	-0.37
Total	29,682		

=== General elections in the 1960s ===
1968 Danish general election

Parties	Vote		
Parties	Votes	%	+ / -
Social Democrats	13,033	42.23	-4.68
Venstre	5,879	19.05	-0.56
Conservatives	5,377	17.42	+2.28
Social Liberals	3,567	11.56	+6.53
Green Left	1,750	5.67	-2.70
Liberal Centre	331	1.07	-1.24
Left Socialists	320	1.04	New
Justice Party of Denmark	244	0.79	+0.03
Communist Party of Denmark	226	0.73	+0.22
Independent Party	137	0.44	-0.93
Total	30,864		

1966 Danish general election

Parties	Vote		
Parties	Votes	%	+ / -
Social Democrats	13,969	46.91	-2.10
Venstre	5,839	19.61	-0.04
Conservatives	4,507	15.14	-3.36
Green Left	2,491	8.37	+4.51
Social Liberals	1,497	5.03	+1.48
Liberal Centre	687	2.31	New
Independent Party	409	1.37	-1.26
Justice Party of Denmark	226	0.76	-0.38
Communist Party of Denmark	151	0.51	-0.34
Total	29,776		

1964 Danish general election

Parties	Vote		
Parties	Votes	%	+ / -
Social Democrats	13,374	49.01	+2.51
Venstre	5,361	19.65	-2.91
Conservatives	5,047	18.50	+3.32
Green Left	1,054	3.86	-1.49
Social Liberals	968	3.55	-0.52
Independent Party	718	2.63	-1.01
Justice Party of Denmark	312	1.14	-0.80
Communist Party of Denmark	231	0.85	+0.08
Danish Unity	121	0.44	New
Peace Politics People's Party	102	0.37	New
Total	27,288		

1960 Danish general election

Parties	Vote		
Parties	Votes	%	+ / -
Social Democrats	11,552	46.50	+1.73
Venstre	5,604	22.56	-4.07
Conservatives	3,770	15.18	+2.53
Green Left	1,328	5.35	New
Social Liberals	1,011	4.07	-1.53
Independent Party	904	3.64	+1.05
Justice Party of Denmark	482	1.94	-3.53
Communist Party of Denmark	191	0.77	-1.51
Total	24,842		

=== General elections in the 1950s ===
1957 Danish general election

Parties	Vote		
Parties	Votes	%	+ / -
Social Democrats	10,532	44.77	-2.40
Venstre	6,265	26.63	-1.01
Conservatives	2,975	12.65	+1.98
Social Liberals	1,318	5.60	+0.29
Justice Party of Denmark	1,287	5.47	+2.45
Independent Party	609	2.59	-0.51
Communist Party of Denmark	537	2.28	-0.81
Total	23,523		

September 1953 Danish Folketing election

Parties	Vote		
Parties	Votes	%	+ / -
Social Democrats	10,348	47.17	+1.79
Venstre	6,063	27.64	+1.09
Conservatives	2,340	10.67	-1.85
Social Liberals	1,166	5.31	-1.03
Independent Party	681	3.10	New
Communist Party of Denmark	678	3.09	-0.40
Justice Party of Denmark	662	3.02	-1.56
Total	21,938		

April 1953 Danish Folketing election

Parties	Vote		
Parties	Votes	%	+ / -
Social Democrats	9,377	45.38	+0.61
Venstre	5,487	26.55	+2.02
Conservatives	2,588	12.52	-1.51
Social Liberals	1,311	6.34	+1.19
Justice Party of Denmark	946	4.58	-3.31
Communist Party of Denmark	722	3.49	-0.13
Danish Unity	233	1.13	New
Total	20,664		

1950 Danish Folketing election

Parties	Vote		
Parties	Votes	%	+ / -
Social Democrats	9,165	44.77	-1.18
Venstre	5,023	24.53	-6.47
Conservatives	2,873	14.03	+5.61
Justice Party of Denmark	1,615	7.89	+3.30
Social Liberals	1,055	5.15	+1.94
Communist Party of Denmark	742	3.62	-1.19
Total	20,473		

=== General elections in the 1940s ===
1947 Danish Folketing election

Parties	Vote		
Parties	Votes	%	+ / -
Social Democrats	9,306	45.95	+8.55
Venstre	6,278	31.00	+5.23
Conservatives	1,705	8.42	-4.89
Communist Party of Denmark	974	4.81	-8.07
Justice Party of Denmark	930	4.59	+3.13
Social Liberals	650	3.21	-0.39
Danish Unity	408	2.01	-3.57
Total	20,251		

1945 Danish Folketing election

Parties	Vote		
Parties	Votes	%	+ / -
Social Democrats	7,398	37.40	-14.70
Venstre	5,097	25.77	+6.70
Conservatives	2,632	13.31	-3.90
Communist Party of Denmark	2,547	12.88	New
Danish Unity	1,103	5.58	+1.70
Social Liberals	713	3.60	+0.28
Justice Party of Denmark	289	1.46	+0.31
	0,0		0.00
Total	19,779		

1943 Danish Folketing election

Parties	Vote		
Parties	Votes	%	+ / -
Social Democrats	10,148	52.10	+0.55
Venstre	3,714	19.07	+1.41
Conservatives	3,352	17.21	+3.60
Danish Unity	755	3.88	+1.85
Social Liberals	647	3.32	-0.79
Farmers' Party	356	1.83	-2.65
National Socialist Workers' Party of Denmark	283	1.45	+0.82
Justice Party of Denmark	224	1.15	-0.58
Total	19,479		

=== General elections in the 1930s ===
1939 Danish Folketing election

Parties	Vote		
Parties	Votes	%	+ / -
Social Democrats	8,769	51.55	-5.13
Venstre	3,004	17.66	+2.37
Conservatives	2,315	13.61	-1.39
Farmers' Party	762	4.48	-0.79
Social Liberals	700	4.11	+0.39
Communist Party of Denmark	473	2.78	+1.63
Danish Unity	345	2.03	New
Justice Party of Denmark	295	1.73	-0.45
National Cooperation	240	1.41	New
National Socialist Workers' Party of Denmark	108	0.63	-0.08
Total	17,011		

1935 Danish Folketing election

Parties	Vote		
Parties	Votes	%	+ / -
Social Democrats	9,348	56.68	+3.07
Venstre	2,522	15.29	-9.50
Conservatives	2,474	15.00	-0.25
Independent People's Party	869	5.27	New
Social Liberals	613	3.72	+0.79
Justice Party of Denmark	359	2.18	-0.34
Communist Party of Denmark	190	1.15	+0.24
National Socialist Workers' Party of Denmark	117	0.71	New
Total	16,492		

1932 Danish Folketing election

Parties	Vote		
Parties	Votes	%	+ / -
Social Democrats	8,170	53.61	+0.61
Venstre	3,778	24.79	-5.33
Conservatives	2,324	15.25	+3.12
Social Liberals	446	2.93	-0.04
Justice Party of Denmark	384	2.52	+1.03
Communist Party of Denmark	138	0.91	+0.62
Total	15,240		

=== General elections in the 1920s ===
1929 Danish Folketing election

Parties	Vote		
Parties	Votes	%	+ / -
Social Democrats	7,592	53.00	+4.97
Venstre	4,315	30.12	-1.84
Conservatives	1,737	12.13	-3.42
Social Liberals	426	2.97	+0.10
Justice Party of Denmark	213	1.49	+0.46
Total	14,324		

1926 Danish Folketing election

Parties	Vote		
Parties	Votes	%	+ / -
Social Democrats	6,451	48.03	+0.42
Venstre	4,293	31.96	-1.27
Conservatives	2,088	15.55	+4.02
Social Liberals	385	2.87	-0.19
Justice Party of Denmark	139	1.03	+0.42
Communist Party of Denmark	75	0.56	+0.09
Total	13,431		

1924 Danish Folketing election

Parties	Vote		
Parties	Votes	%	+ / -
Social Democrats	6,061	47.61	+7.42
Venstre	4,231	33.23	-11.73
Conservatives	1,468	11.53	+2.34
Farmer Party	444	3.49	New
Social Liberals	389	3.06	+0.26
Total	12,731		

September 1920 Danish Folketing election

Parties	Vote		
Parties	Votes	%	+ / -
Venstre	5,474	44.96	-2.51
Social Democrats	4,893	40.19	+2.50
Conservatives	1,119	9.19	-0.27
Social Liberals	341	2.80	+0.12
Industry Party	274	2.25	-0.02
Danish Left Socialist Party	75	0.62	New
Total	12,176		

July 1920 Danish Folketing election

Parties	Vote		
Parties	Votes	%	+ / -
Venstre	4,872	47.47	+1.34
Social Democrats	3,869	37.69	+0.79
Conservatives	971	9.46	-0.85
Social Liberals	275	2.68	-0.16
Industry Party	233	2.27	-1.04
Sigvald Hellberg	44	0.43	-0.08
Total	10,264		

April 1920 Danish Folketing election

Parties	Vote	
Parties	Votes	%
Venstre	4,915	46.13
Social Democrats	3,931	36.90
Conservatives	1,098	10.31
Industry Party	353	3.31
Social Liberals	303	2.84
Sigvald Hellberg	54	0.51
Total	10,654	

== European Parliament elections results ==
2024 European Parliament election in Denmark

Parties	Vote		
Parties	Votes	%	+ / -
Social Democrats	3,871	19.24	-7.68
Venstre	3,015	14.99	-7.01
Green Left	3,006	14.94	+5.04
Conservatives	1,786	8.88	+3.48
Danish People's Party	1,702	8.46	-6.69
Denmark Democrats	1,618	8.04	New
Liberal Alliance	1,546	7.69	+5.3
Moderates	1,299	6.46	New
Social Liberals	1,010	5.02	-2.16
Red–Green Alliance	829	4.12	-0.92
The Alternative	434	2.16	-
Total	20,116		

2019 European Parliament election in Denmark

Parties	Vote		
Parties	Votes	%	+ / -
Social Democrats	6,272	26.92	+5.46
Venstre	5,125	22.00	+6.45
Danish People's Party	3,531	15.15	-19.86
Green Left	2,307	9.90	+2.46
Social Liberals	1,672	7.18	+3.36
Conservatives	1,259	5.40	-2.43
Red–Green Alliance	1,175	5.04	New
People's Movement against the EU	899	3.86	-2.78
Liberal Alliance	556	2.39	+0.14
The Alternative	504	2.16	New
Total	23,300		

2014 European Parliament election in Denmark

Parties	Vote		
Parties	Votes	%	+ / -
Danish People's Party	6,794	35.01	+16.10
Social Democrats	4,165	21.46	-0.33
Venstre	3,017	15.55	-5.06
Conservatives	1,519	7.83	-5.14
Green Left	1,443	7.44	-6.57
People's Movement against the EU	1,289	6.64	+0.04
Social Liberals	742	3.82	+1.31
Liberal Alliance	437	2.25	+1.63
Total	19,406		

2009 European Parliament election in Denmark

Parties	Vote		
Parties	Votes	%	+ / -
Social Democrats	4,396	21.79	-17.90
Venstre	4,158	20.61	+1.16
Danish People's Party	3,815	18.91	+11.11
Green Left	2,825	14.01	+8.66
Conservatives	2,616	12.97	+3.32
People's Movement against the EU	1,332	6.60	+2.83
Social Liberals	506	2.51	-1.12
June Movement	398	1.97	-6.76
Liberal Alliance	125	0.62	New
Total	20,171		

2004 European Parliament election in Denmark

Parties	Vote		
Parties	Votes	%	+ / -
Social Democrats	7,726	39.69	+20.63
Venstre	3,787	19.45	-4.15
Conservatives	1,878	9.65	+2.03
June Movement	1,699	8.73	-8.60
Danish People's Party	1,518	7.80	+1.43
Green Left	1,041	5.35	-0.74
People's Movement against the EU	733	3.77	-2.59
Social Liberals	707	3.63	-3.60
Christian Democrats	379	1.95	-1.03
Total	19,468		

1999 European Parliament election in Denmark

Parties	Vote		
Parties	Votes	%	+ / -
Venstre	4,710	23.60	+3.13
Social Democrats	3,804	19.06	+1.47
June Movement	3,458	17.33	+3.86
Conservatives	1,521	7.62	-7.97
Social Liberals	1,443	7.23	+0.47
Danish People's Party	1,272	6.37	New
People's Movement against the EU	1,270	6.36	-1.95
Green Left	1,215	6.09	-6.28
Centre Democrats	670	3.36	+2.63
Christian Democrats	594	2.98	+1.38
Progress Party	142	0.71	-2.40
Total	19,957		

1994 European Parliament election in Denmark

Parties	Vote		
Parties	Votes	%	+ / -
Venstre	4,315	20.47	+6.84
Social Democrats	3,708	17.59	-12.92
Conservatives	3,286	15.59	+0.54
June Movement	2,839	13.47	New
Green Left	2,608	12.37	+5.55
People's Movement against the EU	1,751	8.31	-8.00
Social Liberals	1,424	6.76	+4.88
Progress Party	655	3.11	-2.98
Christian Democrats	337	1.60	-1.55
Centre Democrats	154	0.73	-5.81
Total	21,077		

1989 European Parliament election in Denmark

Parties	Vote		
Parties	Votes	%	+ / -
Social Democrats	5,595	30.51	+5.70
People's Movement against the EU	2,991	16.31	-1.74
Conservatives	2,760	15.05	-6.20
Venstre	2,500	13.63	+2.87
Green Left	1,251	6.82	-1.03
Centre Democrats	1,200	6.54	-0.14
Progress Party	1,117	6.09	+2.67
Christian Democrats	577	3.15	-0.59
Social Liberals	345	1.88	-0.79
Total	18,336		

1984 European Parliament election in Denmark

Parties	Vote	
Parties	Votes	%
Social Democrats	4,995	24.81
Conservatives	4,279	21.25
People's Movement against the EU	3,634	18.05
Venstre	2,167	10.76
Green Left	1,581	7.85
Centre Democrats	1,344	6.68
Christian Democrats	752	3.74
Progress Party	688	3.42
Social Liberals	537	2.67
Left Socialists	156	0.77
Total	20,133	

== Referendums ==
2022 Danish European Union opt-out referendum

Option	Votes	%
✓ YES	15,271	62.23
X NO	9,268	37.77

2015 Danish European Union opt-out referendum

Option	Votes	%
X NO	15,582	58.98
✓ YES	10,838	41.02

2014 Danish Unified Patent Court membership referendum

Option	Votes	%
✓ YES	11,166	58.89
X NO	7,796	41.11

2009 Danish Act of Succession referendum

Option	Votes	%
✓ YES	16,262	84.35
X NO	3,017	15.65

2000 Danish euro referendum

Option	Votes	%
X NO	20,494	54.62
✓ YES	17,026	45.38

1998 Danish Amsterdam Treaty referendum

Option	Votes	%
✓ YES	17,165	52.46
X NO	15,556	47.54

1993 Danish Maastricht Treaty referendum

Option	Votes	%
✓ YES	21,220	57.02
X NO	15,996	42.98

1992 Danish Maastricht Treaty referendum

Option	Votes	%
X NO	18,331	51.28
✓ YES	17,417	48.72

1986 Danish Single European Act referendum

Option	Votes	%
✓ YES	18,008	59.00
X NO	12,513	41.00

1972 Danish European Communities membership referendum

Option	Votes	%
✓ YES	20,553	65.53
X NO	10,813	34.47

1953 Danish constitutional and electoral age referendum

Option	Votes	%
✓ YES	12,317	78.06
X NO	3,461	21.94
23 years	8,833	55.39
21 years	7,114	44.61

1939 Danish constitutional referendum

Option	Votes	%
✓ YES	9,397	88.35
X NO	1,239	11.65
