= ELDR =

ELDR may refer to:

- European Liberal Democrat and Reform Party, the former name of the Alliance of Liberals and Democrats for Europe Party
- European Liberal Democrat and Reform Party Group in the European Parliament 1994–2004
