= European Liberal Democrat and Reform Party Group =

Former liberal political group of the European Parliament (1976–2004)

- European Parliament group
- Name: European Liberal Democrat and Reform Party Group
- English abbr.: ELDR (1994–2004); LDR (1985–1994); LD (1976–1985); L (1953–1976)
- Formal name: Group of the European Liberal, Democrat and Reform Party (19 July 1994 to 20 July 2004); Liberal and Democratic Reformist Group (13 December 1985 to 18 July 1994); Liberal and Democratic Group (1976 to 12 December 1985); Liberals and Allies Group (23 June 1953 to 1976)
- Ideology: Liberalism
- Political position: Centre
- European parties: European Liberal Democrat and Reform Party
- From: 23 June 1953
- To: 20 July 2004
- Preceded by: new establishment
- Succeeded by: Alliance of Liberals and Democrats for Europe

The Group of the European Liberal Democrat and Reform Party (French: Groupe du parti européen des libéraux, démocrates et réformateurs, ELDR) was a liberal political group of the European Parliament between 1976 and 2004. The group comprised the European Liberal Democrat and Reform Party and its constituent national-level parties, variously of liberal, centrist and agrarian orientation.

Its predecessors have existed since 23 June 1953, then under the name of Liberals and Allies Group. In 1976, the name was changed to Liberal and Democratic Group (LD), and on 13 December 1985 to Liberal and Democratic Reformist Group (LDR). The addition of "Reformist" was a concession to the Social Democratic Party of Portugal, which did not identify as a liberal party.

The ELDR group partnered with the European People's Party – European Democrats (EPP-ED) to form the majority-forming coalition for the 5th Parliament, during which time it elected its sole President of the European Parliament, Pat Cox during the second half of the term.

Following the 2004 European elections the ELDR was expanded and renamed the Alliance of Liberals and Democrats for Europe (ALDE) group.

== Chairmen ==
- 1979–1984: Martin Bangemann, Germany (FDP)
- 1984–1989: Simone Veil, France (UDF)
- 1989–1991: Valéry Giscard d'Estaing, France (UDF-PR)
- 1992–1994: Yves Galland, France (UDF-Rad)
- 1994–1998: Gijs de Vries, Netherlands (VVD)
- 1998–2002: Pat Cox, Ireland (independent)
- 2001–2004: Graham Watson, United Kingdom (LibDem)

== Presidents of the European Parliament from the Liberal Groups ==
- 1962–1964: Gaetano Martino, Italy (PLI)
- 1973–1975: Cornelis Berkhouwer, Netherlands (VVD)
- 1979–1982: Simone Veil, France (UDF)
- 2002–2004: Pat Cox, Ireland (independent)

== Represented parties ==
Country	National Party	years
Belgium	Party for Freedom and Progress	1979–1992
Belgium	Liberal Reformist Party	1979–2002
Belgium	Flemish Liberals and Democrats	1992–2004
Belgium	Democratic Front of the Francophones	1994–1999
Belgium	Reformist Movement	2002–2004
France	Union for French Democracy	1979–1994
France	National Centre of Independents and Peasants	1989–1992
Germany	Free Democratic Party	1979–1984; 1989–1999
Italy	Italian Liberal Party	1979–1989
Italy	Italian Republican Party	1979–2001
Italy	Lega Nord	1994–1997
Italy	The Democrats	1999–2002
Italy	European Republicans Movement	2001–2004
Italy	Democracy is Freedom – The Daisy	2002–2004
Luxembourg	Democratic Party	1979–2004
Netherlands	People's Party for Freedom and Democracy	1979–2004
Netherlands	Democrats 66	1989–2004
Denmark	Venstre – Liberal Party	1979–2004
Denmark	Danish Social Liberal Party	1994–2004
Ireland	Progressive Democrats	1989–1994
Ireland	Independents	1979–2004
United Kingdom	Liberal Democrats	1994–2004
Portugal	Social Democratic Party	1987–1996
Spain	Democratic and Social Centre	1987–1994
Spain	Democratic Convergence of Catalonia	1987–2004
Spain	Canarian Coalition	1999–2004
Sweden	Liberal People's Party	1995–2004
Sweden	Centre Party	1995–2004
Finland	Centre Party	1996–2004
Finland	Swedish People's Party	1996–2004
