= 1999 European Parliament election in Denmark =

← 1994	10 June 1999	2004 →

16 seats to the European Parliament

European Parliament elections were held in Denmark on 10 June 1999 to elect the 16 Danish members of the European Parliament.

== Results ==
Seats were allocated first by the D'Hondt method to electoral coalitions (Venstre + Conservative People's Party + Centre Democrats; June Movement + People's Movement against the EU) and the remaining parties by themselves; then subsequently between the parties in each coalition.

Party	Votes	%	Seats	+/–
Venstre	460,834	23.39	5	+1
Social Democrats	324,256	16.46	3	0
June Movement	317,508	16.11	3	+1
Danish Social Liberal Party	180,089	9.14	1	0
Conservative People's Party	166,884	8.47	1	–2
People's Movement against the EU	143,709	7.29	1	–1
Socialist People's Party	140,053	7.11	1	0
Danish People's Party	114,865	5.83	1	New
Centre Democrats	68,717	3.49	0	0
Christian People's Party	39,128	1.99	0	0
Progress Party	14,233	0.72	0	0
Total	1,970,276	100.00	16	0
Valid votes	1,970,276	97.38		
Invalid/blank votes	53,030	2.62		
Total votes	2,023,306	100.00		
Registered voters/turnout	4,009,594	50.46		
Source: Ministry of the Interior

=== Seat apportionment ===
Main apportionment
Letter	Electoral alliance/party outside of electoral alliance	Votes	Quotients	Seats
A	Social Democrats	324,256	3.24	3
B	Danish Social Liberal Party	180,089	1.80	1
CDV	Conservative People's Party/Centre Democrats/Venstre	696,435	6.96	6
F	Socialist People's Party	140,053	1.40	1
JN	June Movement/People's Movement against the EU	461,217	4.61	4
O	Danish People's Party	114,865	1.15	1
Q	Christian People's Party	39,128	0.39	0
Z	Progress Party	14,233	0.14	0
Divisor: 100,000

Alliance 1
Letter	Party	Votes	Quotients	Seats
C	Conservative People's Party	166,884	1.85	1
D	Centre Democrats	68,717	0.76	0
V	Venstre	460,834	5.12	5
Divisor: 90,000

Alliance 2
Letter	Party	Votes	Quotients	Seats
J	June Movement	317,508	3.18	3
N	People's Movement against the EU	143,709	1.44	1
Divisor: 100,000

== See also ==
- List of members of the European Parliament for Denmark, 1999–2004
