= 1989 European Parliament election in Denmark =

← 1984	15 June 1989	1994 →

16 seats to the European Parliament

European Parliament elections were held in Denmark on 15 June 1989 to elect the 16 Danish members of the European Parliament.

== Results ==
Seats are allocated first by the D'Hondt method to electoral coalitions (Social Democrats and Danish Social Liberal Party, Venstre and Conservative People's Party, People's Movement against the EEC and Socialist People's Party, Centre Democrats and Christian People's Party) and the remaining parties by themselves; then subsequently between the parties in each coalition.

Party	Votes	%	Seats	+/–
Social Democrats	417,076	23.31	4	+1
People's Movement against the EEC	338,953	18.94	4	0
Venstre	297,565	16.63	3	+1
Conservative People's Party	238,760	13.34	2	–2
Socialist People's Party	162,902	9.10	1	0
Centre Democrats	142,190	7.95	2	+1
Progress Party	93,985	5.25	0	0
Danish Social Liberal Party	50,196	2.81	0	0
Christian People's Party	47,768	2.67	0	0
Total	1,789,395	100.00	16	+1
Valid votes	1,789,395	98.78		
Invalid/blank votes	22,163	1.22		
Total votes	1,811,558	100.00		
Registered voters/turnout	3,923,549	46.17		
Source: Folketingsårbog

=== Seat apportionment ===
Main apportionment
Letter	Electoral alliance/party outside of electoral alliance	Votes	Quotients	Seats
AB	Social Democrats/Danish Social Liberal Party	467,272	4.97	4
CV	Conservative People's Party/Venstre	536,325	5.71	5
DQ	Centre Democrats/Christian People's Party	189,958	2.02	2
FN	Socialist People's Party/People's Movement against the EEC	501,855	5.34	5
Z	Progress Party	93,985	0.9998	0
Divisor: 94,000

Alliance 1
Letter	Party	Votes	Quotients	Seats
A	Social Democrats	417,076	4.17	4
B	Danish Social Liberal Party	50,196	0.50	0
Divisor: 100,000

Alliance 2
Letter	Party	Votes	Quotients	Seats
C	Conservative People's Party	238,760	2.65	2
V	Venstre	297,565	3.31	3
Divisor: 90,000

Alliance 3
Letter	Party	Votes	Quotients	Seats
D	Centre Democrats	142,190	2.37	2
Q	Christian People's Party	47,768	0.80	0
Divisor: 60,000

Alliance 4
Letter	Party	Votes	Quotients	Seats
F	Socialist People's Party	162,902	1.96	1
N	People's Movement against the EEC	338,953	4.08	4
Divisor: 83,000
