= 2004 European Parliament election in Denmark =

← 1999	13 June 2004	2009 →

14 seats to the European Parliament

European Parliament elections were held in Denmark on 13 June 2004 to elect the 14 Danish members of the European Parliament. The opposition Social Democrats made major gains, mainly at the expense of Eurosceptic parties such as the June Movement.

== Results ==
Seats were allocated first by the D'Hondt method to electoral coalitions (Social Democrats + Socialist People's Party; Venstre + Conservative People's Party; June Movement + People's Movement against the EU; Danish Social Liberal Party + Christian Democrats), then subsequently among the parties in each coalition. Compared to straight allocation by party, the People's Movement against the EU gained one seat at the expense of the Conservative People's Party.

Party	Votes	%	Seats	+/–
Social Democrats	618,412	32.65	5	+2
Venstre	366,735	19.36	3	–2
Conservative People's Party	214,972	11.35	1	0
June Movement	171,927	9.08	1	–2
Socialist People's Party	150,766	7.96	1	0
Danish People's Party	128,789	6.80	1	0
Danish Social Liberal Party	120,473	6.36	1	0
People's Movement against the EU	97,986	5.17	1	0
Christian Democrats	24,286	1.28	0	0
Total	1,894,346	100.00	14	–2
Valid votes	1,894,346	98.58		
Invalid/blank votes	27,195	1.42		
Total votes	1,921,541	100.00		
Registered voters/turnout	4,012,663	47.89		
Source: Ministry of the Interior

=== Seat apportionment ===
Main apportionment
Letter	Electoral alliance/party outside of electoral alliance	Votes	Quotients	Seats
AF	Social Democrats/Socialist People's Party	769,178	6.41	6
BK	Danish Social Liberal Party/Christian Democrats	144,759	1.21	1
CV	Conservative People's Party/Venstre	581,707	4.85	4
JN	June Movement/People's Movement against the EU	269,913	2.25	2
O	Danish People's Party	128,789	1.07	1
Divisor: 120,000

Alliance 1
Letter	Party	Votes	Quotients	Seats
A	Social Democrats	618,412	5.62	5
F	Socialist People's Party	150,766	1.37	1
Divisor: 110,000

Alliance 2
Letter	Party	Votes	Quotients	Seats
B	Danish Social Liberal Party	120,473	1.20	1
K	Christian Democrats	24,286	0.24	0
Divisor: 100,000

Alliance 3
Letter	Party	Votes	Quotients	Seats
C	Conservative People's Party	214,972	1.95	1
V	Venstre	366,735	3.33	3
Divisor: 110,000

Alliance 4
Letter	Party	Votes	Quotients	Seats
J	June Movement	171,927	1.91	1
N	People's Movement against the EU	97,986	1.09	1
Divisor: 90,000
