= 2009 European Parliament election in Denmark =

- 7 June 2009

13 seats in the European Parliament
- Largest party within each Folketing nomination district and constituency.

European Parliament elections were held in Denmark on 7 June 2009 to elect the 13 Danish members of the European Parliament. The election was held simultaneously with a referendum on changing the Danish Act of Succession.

== Contesting parties ==
All Danish parties which were represented in the European Parliament announced they would take part in the election. These were the Social Democrats, Venstre (Liberal Party), Conservative People's Party, June Movement, Socialist People's Party, Danish People's Party, Social Liberal Party and the People's Movement against the EU.

As in the last election, several electoral coalitions were agreed to before the vote. The Social Democrats sided with the Social Liberal Party and the Socialist People's Party, while Venstre teamed up with the Conservative People's Party and Liberal Alliance. EU-critics JuniBevægelsen and the People's Movement against the EU were also in a coalition, meaning that the only party not in a coalition was the Danish People's Party.

== Electoral system ==
Under the Danish electoral code for European Parliament elections, parties that surpassed the 2% threshold in the last Folketing elections may also take part in the European elections, should they wish so.

== Opinion polls ==
Source	Date	SD	V	SF	K	DF	FM EU	RV	JB	LA	Undecided
	26–1 March April 2009	26.4%	22%	17.4%	12.1%	12%	4%	3.9%	2.2%	–	–
	22 May 2009	27.9%	24.4%	13.4%	11.8%	8.6%	6.3%	4.4%	3.2%	–	–
	29 May 2009	26.5%	23.5%	12.1%	13.6%	10.2%	5.3%	4.5%	3.8%	0.5%	–
,	5 June 2009	24.1%	23.3%	15.8%	? 12%	11.8%	5.2%	3.7%	3.5%	?	–
	6 June 2009	22.6%	22.4%	15.5%	12.3%	6.7%	6.5%	3.8%	2.9%	0.6%	–

== Results ==
Party	Votes	%	Seats	+/–
Social Democrats	503,439	21.49	4	–1
Venstre	474,041	20.24	3	0
Socialist People's Party	371,603	15.87	2	+1
Danish People's Party	357,942	15.28	2	+1
Conservative People's Party	297,199	12.69	1	0
People's Movement against the EU	168,555	7.20	1	0
Danish Social Liberal Party	100,094	4.27	0	–1
June Movement	55,459	2.37	0	–1
Liberal Alliance	13,796	0.59	0	New
Total	2,342,128	100.00	13	–1
Valid votes	2,342,128	96.96		
Invalid/blank votes	73,440	3.04		
Total votes	2,415,568	100.00		
Registered voters/turnout	4,057,100	59.54		
Source: Statistics Denmark

=== Seat apportionment ===
Main apportionment
Letter	Electoral alliance/party outside of electoral alliance	Votes	Quotients	Seats
ABF	Social Democrats/Danish Social Liberal Party/Socialist People's Party	975,136	6.09	6
CIV	Conservative People's Party/Liberal Alliance/Venstre	785,036	4.91	4
JN	June Movement/People's Movement against the EU	224,014	1.40	1
O	Danish People's Party	357,942	2.24	2
Divisor: 160,000

Alliance 1
Letter	Party	Votes	Quotients	Seats
A	Social Democrats	503,439	4.03	4
B	Danish Social Liberal Party	100,094	0.80	0
F	Socialist People's Party	371,603	2.97	2
Divisor: 125,000

Alliance 2
Letter	Party	Votes	Quotients	Seats
C	Conservative People's Party	297,199	1.98	1
I	Liberal Alliance	13,796	0.09	0
V	Venstre	474,041	3.16	3
Divisor: 150,000

Alliance 3
Letter	Party	Votes	Quotients	Seats
J	June Movement	55,459	0.55	0
N	People's Movement against the EU	168,555	1.69	1
Divisor: 100,000

=== Elected members ===
The final list of MEP were determined by a recount of votes on individual politicians:

- Social Democrats (4 seats)
  1. Dan Jørgensen (233,266 votes)
  2. Christel Schaldemose (43,855)
  3. Britta Thomsen (32,569)
  4. Ole Christensen (20,597)
- Conservative People's Party (1 seat)
  1. Bendt Bendtsen (176,786 votes)
- Socialist People's Party (2 seats)
  1. Margrete Auken (204,111 votes)
  2. Emilie Turunen (37,330)
- People's Movement against the EU (1 seat)
  1. Søren Søndergaard (107,429 votes)
- Danish People's Party (2 seats)
  1. Morten Messerschmidt (284,500 votes)
  2. Anna Rosbach Andersen (3,592)
- Venstre (3 seats)
  1. Jens Rohde (171,205 votes)
  2. Morten Løkkegaard (57,175)
  3. Anne Elisabet Jensen (47,906)

== Aftermath ==
After the election, both head of the June Movement Keld Albrechtsen and lead candidate Hanne Dahl announced that they intended to disband the movement after obtaining no seats at the election.
