= 1984 European Parliament election in Denmark =

← 1979	14 June 1984	1989 →

16 seats in the European Parliament

European Parliament elections were held in Denmark on 14 June 1984 to elect the 15 Danish members of the European Parliament. Elections were held separately in Greenland to elect one Greenlandic member.

== Results ==
Party	Votes	%	Seats	+/–
Conservative People's Party	414,177	20.81	4	+2
People's Movement against the EEC	413,808	20.79	4	0
Social Democrats	387,098	19.45	3	0
Venstre	248,397	12.48	2	–1
Socialist People's Party	183,580	9.22	1	0
Centre Democrats	131,984	6.63	1	0
Progress Party	68,747	3.45	0	–1
Danish Social Liberal Party	62,560	3.14	0	0
Christian People's Party	54,624	2.74	0	0
Left Socialists	25,305	1.27	0	0
Total	1,990,280	100.00	15	0
Valid votes	1,990,280	98.85		
Invalid/blank votes	23,079	1.15		
Total votes	2,013,359	100.00		
Registered voters/turnout	3,843,947	52.38		
Source: Folketingsårbog

=== Seat apportionment ===
Main apportionment
Letter	Electoral alliance/party outside of electoral alliance	Votes	Quotients	Seats
A	Social Democrats	387,098	3.52	3
B	Danish Social Liberal Party	62,560	0.57	0
CV	Conservative People's Party/Venstre	662,574	6.02	6
FNY	Socialist People's Party/People's Movement against the EEC/Left Socialists	622,693	5.66	5
MQ	Centre Democrats/Christian People's Party	186,608	1.70	1
Z	Progress Party	68,747	0.62	0
Divisor: 110,000

Alliance 1
Letter	Party	Votes	Quotients	Seats
C	Conservative People's Party	414,177	4,14	4
V	Venstre	248,397	2,48	2
Divisor: 100,000

Alliance 2
Letter	Party	Votes	Quotients	Seats
F	Socialist People's Party	183,580	1.84	1
N	People's Movement against the EEC	413,808	4.14	4
Y	Left Socialists	25,305	0.25	0
Divisor: 100,000

Alliance 3
Letter	Party	Votes	Quotients	Seats
M	Centre Democrats	131,984	1.32	1
Q	Christian People's Party	54,624	0.55	0
Divisor: 100,000
