= 1994 European Parliament election in Denmark =

- 9 June 1994

16 seats in the European Parliament

European Parliament elections were held in Denmark on 9 June 1994 to elect the 16 Danish members of the European Parliament.

== Results ==
Seats were allocated first by the D'Hondt method to Electoral coalitions (Danish Social Liberal Party and Christian People's Party; Venstre, Conservative People's Party and Centre Democrats; June Movement and People's Movement against the EU) and the remaining parties by themselves; then subsequently between the parties in each coalition.

Party	Votes	%	Seats	+/–
Venstre	394,362	18.96	4	+1
Conservative People's Party	368,890	17.74	3	+1
Social Democrats	329,202	15.83	3	–1
June Movement	316,687	15.23	2	New
People's Movement against the EU	214,735	10.32	2	–2
Socialist People's Party	178,543	8.58	1	0
Danish Social Liberal Party	176,480	8.48	1	+1
Progress Party	59,687	2.87	0	0
Christian People's Party	22,986	1.11	0	0
Centre Democrats	18,365	0.88	0	–2
Total	2,079,937	100.00	16	0
Valid votes	2,079,937	98.40		
Invalid/blank votes	33,843	1.60		
Total votes	2,113,780	100.00		
Registered voters/turnout	3,994,200	52.92		
Source: Ministry of the Interior

=== Seat apportionment ===
Main apportionment
Letter	Electoral alliance/party outside electoral alliance	Votes	Quotients	Seats
A	Social Democrats	329,202	3.05	3
BQ	Danish Social Liberal Party/Christian People's Party	199,466	1.85	1
CDV	Conservative People's Party/Centre Democrats/Venstre	781,617	7.24	7
F	Socialist People's Party	178.543	1.65	1
JN	June Movement/People's Movement against the EU	531,422	4.92	4
Z	Progress Party	59,687	0.55	0
Divisor: 108,000

Alliance 1
Letter	Party	Votes	Quotients	Seats
B	Danish Social Liberal Party	176,480	1.76	1
Q	Christian People's Party	22,986	0.23	0
Divisor: 100,000

Alliance 2
Letter	Party	Votes	Quotients	Seats
C	Conservative People's Party	368,890	3.88	3
D	Centre Democrats	18,365	0.19	0
V	Venstre	394,362	4.15	4
Divisor: 95,000

Alliance 3
Letter	Party	Votes	Quotients	Seats
J	June Movement	316,687	2.99	2
N	People's Movement against the EU	214,735	2.03	2
Divisor: 106,000
