= Arne Munch-Petersen =

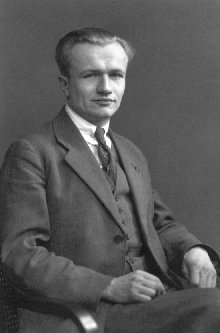

Personal details
- Born: September 30, 1904 Frederiksberg, Denmark
- Died: November 12, 1940 (aged 36) Butyrka Prison, Moscow, Soviet Union

Arne Munch-Petersen (September 30, 1904, in Frederiksberg – November 12, 1940, in Butyrka Prison, Moscow) was a communist Danish politician who was arrested and died during Stalin's purges, which the Danish Communist Party, however, kept hidden from the public. He was a member of the DKP from 1925 and represented the party in the Folketing from 1932 to 1935, after which in January 1936 he became the DKP's representative in the Comintern.

Munch-Petersen's parents were law professor Hans Munch-Petersen and his Austrian wife Lina Johanna, née Mandl. He attended the Metropolitan School and belonged to the same cohort as two other later prominent communists: Mogens Fog and Otto Melchior. From 1935 until his death, Munch-Petersen was married to Elna Hiort-Lorenzen.

Arne Munch-Petersen's fate was unknown to the Danish public until the historian and Land og Folk correspondent Kurt Jacobsen found information about Munch-Petersen in the Soviet archives in 1989. Against the background of baseless accusations of participation in a Trotskyist conspiracy, the NKVD had in 1937 arrested Munch-Petersen and imprisoned him in solitary confinement. He died in 1940 of chronic tuberculosis. It has since emerged that DKP's then chairman Aksel Larsen not only knew what had happened to Munch-Petersen, but had also lied to his wife about the fate of his party colleague, with the result that Elna Hiort-Lorenzen tried for many years in vain to find her husband again.

The Danish politician and former DKP chairman Ole Sohn has written the biography Fra Folketinget til celle 290 about Munch-Petersen's fate.
