= Land og Folk Festival =

Annual cultural festival in Denmark

Land og Folk Festival was an annual cultural festival in Denmark organized by Land og Folk, the now-defunct daily newspaper of the Communist Party of Denmark. Land og Folk Festival gathered close to 100,000 visitors annually.
