= Inger Merete Nordentoft =

Danish educator and politician (1903–1960)

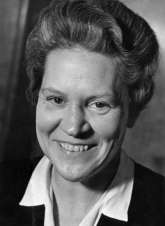
Inger Merete Nordentoft

Inger Merete Nordentoft (16 August 1903, Thisted — 22 October 1960, Copenhagen) was a Danish educator, Communist politician and resistance worker. She is remembered for requesting maternity leave from her post as headmistress of Katrinedals Skole in Copenhagen although she had not married the father and refused to reveal his identity. There was an attempt to force her to leave her post but as a result of support from the majority of her students' parents, she was able to take maternity leave and maintain her post as head.

== Early life, education and family ==
Born in Thisted on 18 August 1903, Inger Merete Nordentoft was the daughter of the physician Poul Nordentoft (1874–1937) and his wife Astrid Kabeli (1880–1953), a midwife. She was one of the family's three children. When she was nine, her parents divorced and she chose to live with her father who moved to Svendborg. When her father was convicted of foster expulsion and imprisoned in 1920, she was placed in a teacher's family and was able to take the real examination. In Svendborg, she met Elisabeth Flagstad who headed the Danish Girl Guides (Det Danske Pigespejderkorps) and became an enthusiastic member.

In 1920, Nordentoft went to live with her mother in Tønder where she attended the teachers' training college for three years and graduated as a teacher.

== Career ==
In 1923, Nordentoft first spent a year at the forestry school in Korinth on the island of Funen before moving to Valby School in Copenhagen where she taught from 1924. In the mid-1930s, she joined the Social Democrats and served on Copenhagen's School Board (Københavns Kommunelærerindeforening) until 1945. She was also active in other teachers' associations and in the Danish Women's Society.

During the German occupation of Denmark, Nordentoft was active in the resistance movement. As a member of Frit Danmark, she helped Danish Jews escape to Sweden. For allowing the telegrapher from Aksel Larsen's network to live in her home, she was imprisoned for nine months from March 1943. After the war, in February 1945 she was appointed head of the Katrinedal School in the Vanløse district of Copenhagen. In addition, in October 1945 she was elected to the Folketing representing the Communist Party in the Valby constituency. She gained wide respect for her political views as well as for chairing Danmarks Demokratiske Kvindeforbund, Denmark's chapter of the Women's International Democratic Federation.

Later in 1945, she first adopted a child and then announced in a closed teachers meeting that she was pregnant and was applying for maternity leave. As she was unmarried and would not reveal the name of her partner, the school board sought to fire her. But as a result of strong support from the parents of her students, she was maintained in her position. She later summarized her stand as "It is the right of every adult to live his life in accordance with his convictions".

Nordentoft was also a writer. In 1944, she published Opdragelse til Demokrati (Education for Democracy) which set out her plans for reforms after the end of the war. In particular, she called for more cooperation between teachers and students. She also wrote a number of textbooks and was editor of the series Børnenes Læsning og Klassens Bibliotek (Children's Reading and the Class Library).

Inger Merete Nordentoft died in Copenhagen of cancer on 22 October 1960, aged only 57.
