= Holger K. Nielsen =

Danish politician (born 1950)

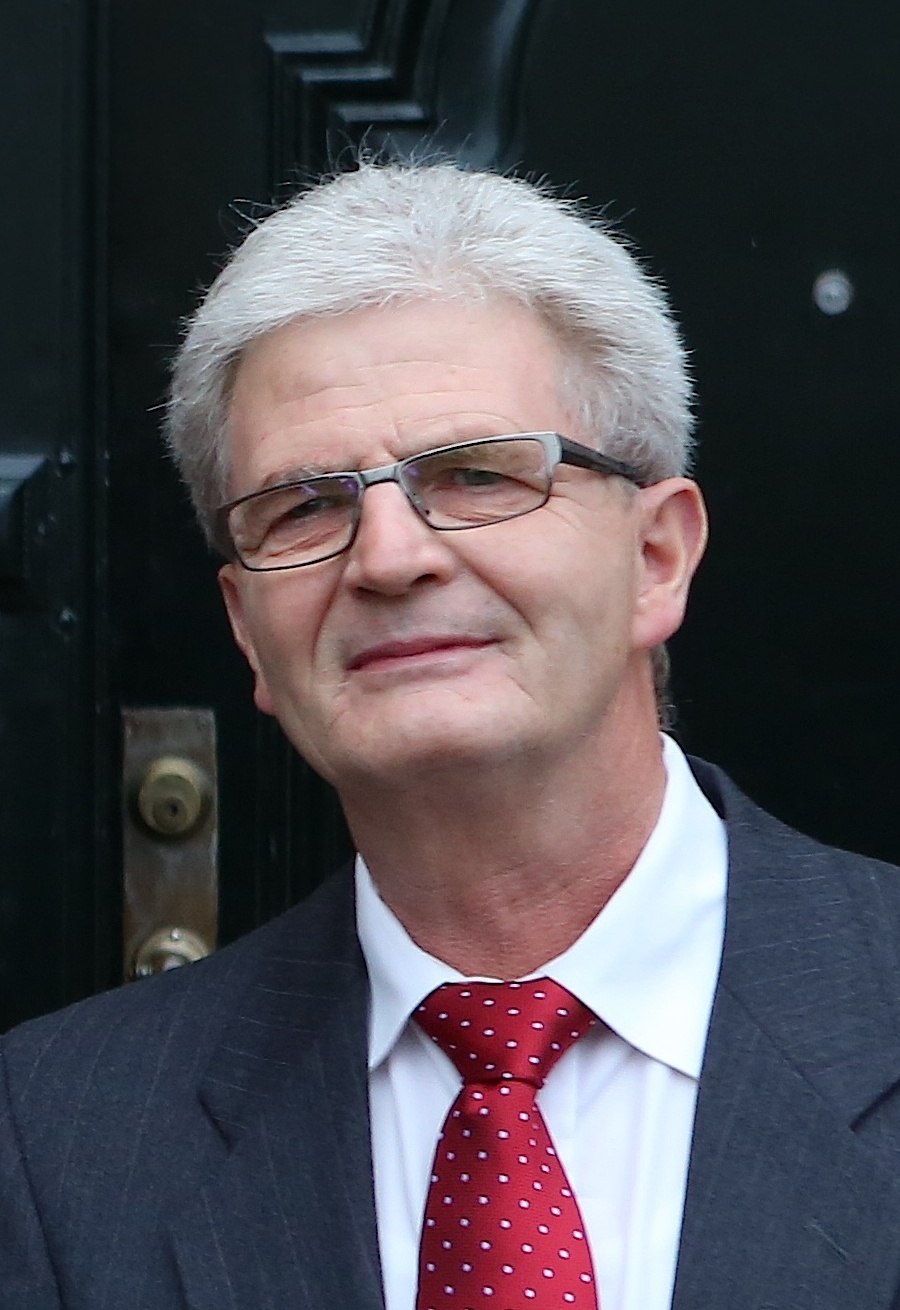

Minister of Foreign Affairs
- In office 12 December 2013 – 30 January 2014
- Prime Minister: Helle Thorning-Schmidt
- Preceded by: Villy Søvndal
- Succeeded by: Martin Lidegaard

Minister for Taxation
- In office 16 October 2012 – 12 December 2013
- Prime Minister: Helle Thorning-Schmidt
- Preceded by: Thor Möger Pedersen
- Succeeded by: Jonas Dahl

Leader of the Socialist People's Party
- In office 1991–2005
- Preceded by: Gert Petersen
- Succeeded by: Villy Søvndal

Personal details
- Born: Holger Kirkholm Nielsen; 23 April 1950 (age 76) Ribe, Denmark
- Party: Socialist People's

Holger Kirkholm Nielsen (born 23 April 1950), is a Danish politician, member of the Folketing for the Socialist People's Party. He was Denmark's Minister for Foreign Affairs for 49 days from December 2013 through January 2014. He was the leader of the Socialist People's Party from 1991 to 2005 and served as the Minister for Taxation from 2012 to 2013.

Born at Ribe, Nielsen studied social science and Danish at the University of Aarhus from 1973 to 1979, and in 1978 at the University of Belgrade.

== Political career ==
He was elected to the Danish Parliament in 1987. He became leader of the Socialist People's Party in 1991 at a time when the party was going through some major ideological soul-searching following the collapse of socialism in Eastern Europe. The opposing candidate for the party leadership was Steen Gade, a self-styled moderniser intent on reforming the party in ways which the majority found too radical. Holger K. Nielsen was considered a 'safer' choice in the eyes of the party's old guard, and thus assumed the leadership allied to the more leftist elements in his party.

Among the policies that had to be addressed was the party's approach to European integration. Having opposed membership of the EC (EU) in 1972, and then campaigned against ratification of the Single European Act in 1986, the party had by the late 1980s grudgingly reconciled itself to Danish membership, dropping the demand for withdrawal in 1990. However, when the Maastricht Treaty came up for approval by referendum in 1992, the party remained true to its roots and recommended a 'NO' vote. Holger K. Nielsen became one of the leaders in this campaign, and was later judged to have swung far more than his own socialist voters towards the NO-side, which to great surprise emerged victorious by a wafer-thin margin. The following year, however, he reversed that position, recommending acceptance of the Maastricht Treaty, supplemented with the four Danish opt-outs. This decision came close to tearing the party apart, with some 60% of its voters remaining opposed, but this time the yes-side prevailed.

During the years of the Poul Nyrup Rasmussen governments (1993–2001), Holger K. Nielsen managed to take the Socialist People's Party closer to the mainstream of Danish politics, positioning the party as a slightly more leftist alternative to the ruling Social Democrats. During this time the party entered into several major compromises with the government in many policy areas, including several state finance bills. However close the socialists moved to the government, though, they never quite became acceptable as coalition partners, much to the chagrin of Holger K. Nielsen. A real popular breakthrough also never materialised, despite the leader's high media profile. The party lost seats in both the 1994 and 2001 elections, only managing to hold on in the 1998 election.

The party was successful in shoring up the centre-left governments of the 1990s. The party remained in the sceptic camp during the 1998 referendum campaign for the Amsterdam Treaty, a move which prompted several prominent pro-Europeans, such as Steen Gade and Christine Antorini, to leave politics. Again in 2000, when the issue was Denmark entering the Economic and Monetary Union, the Socialists were in the forefront of the successful NO-campaign, with Holger K. Nielsen taking a prominent lead. However, later that same year, riding high in the opinion polls, Holger K. Nielsen performed a spectacular U-turn and made his party endorse the Nice Treaty, thus making a referendum avoidable. This was the opening shot in a campaign to turn the formerly EU-sceptic party into pro-Europeans, a process that culminated in late 2004, with the party's rank-and-file following Holger K. Nielsen's advice, and endorsing a pro-ratification stance towards the EU's Draft Constitution.

Following the election in 2001 of a liberal-conservative coalition, the Socialist People's Party found themselves in opposition. After the 2005 parliamentary election, Holger K. Nielsen resigned as party leader.

When Annette Vilhelmsen became the new leader of the party in October 2012, Nielsen, who had been a strong supporter of Vilhelmsen's candidacy, was named new Minister of Taxation in the Cabinet of Helle Thorning-Schmidt. He later became the Minister of Foreign Affairs in the same cabinet until 30 January 2014, when the Socialist People's Party left the coalition and the Thorning-Schmidt II Cabinet was inaugurated.

Nielsen is in his second marriage and has four children, two from each of the marriages.

Party political offices
Preceded by Gert Petersen	Leader of the Danish Socialist People's Party; 1991–2005	Succeeded by Villy Søvndal
Political offices
Preceded by Thor Möger Pedersen	Minister for Taxation of Denmark; 2012–2013	Succeeded by Jonas Dahl
Preceded by Villy Søvndal	Minister of Foreign Affairs; 2013–2014	Succeeded by Martin Lidegaard
