= Gert Petersen =

Danish socialist politician and journalist

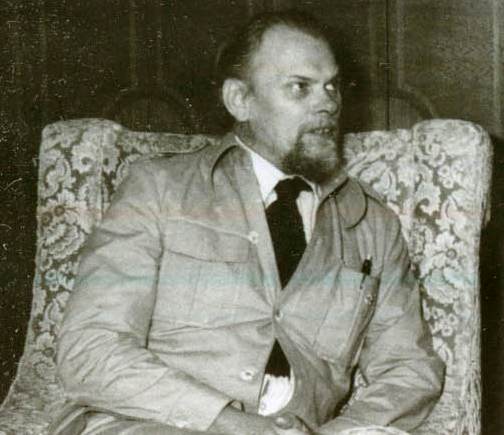
Gert Petersen.

Gert Verner Petersen (19 August 1927 – 1 January 2009) was a journalist and politician who helped found and represent the Socialist People's Party in Denmark. He was born in Nykøbing Falster, Denmark, as the son of the factory worker Karen Rolandsen. He got a high school diploma from Nykøbing Katedralskole in 1945 and studied history at the University of Copenhagen.

== Political career ==
=== Early politics ===
In 1940 at the age of 13, Gert Petersen was a member of the youth movement of the Nazi National Socialist Workers' Party of Denmark for ten months, as he changed his political views. From 1943, he was an active member of the Danish resistance movement but was eventually captured by the Gestapo in 1944 and incarcerated in the Frøslev Camp until the end of the German occupation of Denmark.

=== Communist Party of Denmark ===
He became a member of the Communist Party of Denmark in 1945. He was among those members who wanted to change the party line to a democratic form of socialism. He took part in this debate through the publication "Dialog". When the party line was not changed he followed Aksel Larsen out of the Communist Party and became a co-founder of the Socialist People's Party on 15 February 1959.

=== Socialist People's Party ===
He was a member of the party leadership of the party since 1961 and in periods the party's executive committee and its secretariat. He was party chairman in the period 1974 to 1991 where he showed great ability to combine a Marxist analysis with day-to-day politics. Thus his influence was not limited to the Socialist People's Party but reached wide parts of the Danish left wing.

== Other ==
After Gert Petersen left parliament, he was an active debater on especially foreign policy and frequently occurred in the debate pages of the newspapers.

His membership of the youth wing of the National Socialist Workers' Party of Denmark was first publicly known in 1977, where the controversial author Erik Haaest revealed Petersen's Nazi past. At first, Petersen denied his membership among other places in the newspaper BT on 26 August 1977 with the words: "It is pure nonsense and pure lies. I have never been a member of the Nazi party." Later Petersen had to admit that the allegations were true. For many years until the middle of the 1980s he claimed to have been a member of the Nazi party as a "spy". At last he had to admit that he as a boy had been attracted by the social views and Führer principle of the Nazis.

Codenamed ZEUS by the KGB, Petersen, as a "confidential contact", passed on classified information gleaned from the Danish Foreign Policy Committee, while consuming copious amounts of "beer and schnapps" at the expense of the KGB. He was exposed to MI6 by Oleg Gordievsky, the KGB resident (or rezident), at Copenhagen.

== Journalist ==
He has been

- co-publisher of Dialog 1953-1960
- employed at the party publication SF-bladet 1959-1967, and editor of the publication from 1962–1967
- editor of Her og Nu 1967-1974

== Publications ==
- Vejen til socialismen i Danmark (1960)
- Veje til socialismen i vor tid (1966)
- Om socialismens nødvendighed (1980)
- Om fredens nødvendighed (1981)
- Om nødvendigheden af dansk fredspolitik (1982)
- Verden er ung endnu (1984)
- En ny verdensorden? Ja tak, men en bedre! (1991)
- Indenfor systemet - og udenfor. Erindringer (1998)
- Med frygten som drivkraft. Tanker om den kolde krig(2001)

== See also ==
- Folketinget

Party political offices
| Preceded by Sigurd Ømann | Leader of the Danish Socialist People's Party; 1974 – 1991 | Succeeded by Holger K. Nielsen |
