= Jørgen Jensen (politician) =

Danish trade unionist and politician (1920–1987)

Chairman of the Communist Party of Denmark
- In office December 1977 – 13 April 1987
- Preceded by: Knud Jespersen
- Succeeded by: Ole Sohn

Personal details
- Born: 18 January 1920 Copenhagen, Denmark
- Died: 13 April 1987 (aged 67)
- Party: Communist Party of Denmark

Jørgen Jensen (1920–1987) was a Danish trade unionist and politician who headed the Communist Party of Denmark (CPD) for ten years between 1977 and 1987.

== Early life and education ==
Jensen was born in Copenhagen on 18 January 1920. His father was a worker. Jensen was trained as a car mechanic.

== Career ==
Jensen began to involve in the trade union movement in 1940 and joined the CPD in 1945. During his participation in the CPD the party was still illegal. Jensen was among the leading figures of the All-Danish Committee for Peace between 1952 and 1962. He was elected as a member of the CPD's central committee in 1955 and was a member of its executive committee. He also led the trade unions committee of the CPD. He became the chairman of a division within the metalworkers’ trade union in the Lyngby district of Copenhagen in 1962 and he was elected chairman of the automotive repair workers' trade union in 1969.

Jensen was elected to the Parliament on 9 January 1975 for the CPD representing the Frederiksborg constituency. He became the CPD's parliamentary speaker in 1977. His tenure at the Parliament lasted until 23 October 1979. He was named as the chairman of the CPD by the central committee in December 1977. Jensen succeeded Knud Jespersen in the post and remained in office until 13 April 1987. Jensen's successor as the CPD leader was Ole Sohn.

=== Views and public image ===
Jensen was one of the CPD politicians who were loyal to the Soviet regime. However, he also criticized it in relation to the working conditions in factories. He was also close to the Polish United Workers' Party during his career at the CPD. He criticized both the Socialist People's Party and the Left Socialists in February 1982 arguing that they were supporting the Polish groups against the Communist regime in the country.

Jensen was not regarded as a charismatic leader. The Danish tabloid newspaper Ekstra Bladet nominated him as the "buffoon of the year" in 1981.

== Personal life and death ==
Jensen died on 13 April 1987 when he was serving as the chairman of CPD.
