= Hans Munch =

Hans Munch or Hans Münch may refer to:

- Hans Munch (bishop) (1664–1712), Norwegian bishop
- Hans Münch (1911–2001), German SS physician, known for refusing to assist in the murders at Auschwitz in World War II
- Hans Münch (conductor) (1893–1983), Swiss conductor, composer, and musician
- Hans Munch-Petersen (1869–1934), Danish scholar

== See also ==
- Münch, a list of people with the surnames Münch, Munch, or Muench
