= Sigurd Ømann =

Danish socialist politician

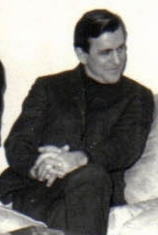
- Ømann in 1970

Member of the Danish Parliament for the Socialist People's Party
- In office 1966–1977

Chairman of the Socialist People's Party
- In office 1968–1974
- Preceded by: Aksel Larsen
- Succeeded by: Gert Petersen

Personal details
- Born: August 16, 1923 Stokkemarke, Denmark
- Died: September 10, 1988 (aged 65)
- Party: Socialist People's Party

Sigurd Ømann (16 August 1923 – 10 September 1988) was chairman of the Socialist People's Party of Denmark in the period 1968–1974. Before he joined the Socialist People's Party, he was a member of the Communist Party of Denmark from 1953 to 1958. He was a member of parliament for the Socialist People's Party from 1966 until he left parliament and the party in 1977.

== Party chairman ==
Born in Stokkemarke, Ømann became chairman of the Socialist People's Party when Aksel Larsen resigned in 1968. The political climate in his period as chairman was marked by the 1972 referendum on Denmark's EC membership as well as the Social Democrats being in opposition and the need for the two left-wing parties to position themselves.

In 1971, the Left Socialists lost parliamentary representation and the Socialist People's Party became the only party in parliament to the left of the Social Democrats. Although Ømann wanted to cooperate with the Social Democrats, such cooperation did not start until 1973 when a national budget deficit created a wish for a more restrictive financial policy. The parliamentary right-wing wanted to cut more costs than the Social Democrats or the Socialist People's Party wanted, so the two parties made an agreement on budget cuts and increases in corporation taxes. In June 1973, a compromise between the two parties on rent regulation forced the Socialist People's Party to accept increases in rents which were contrary to the party's policies.

In the campaign leading up to the referendum on Denmark's EC membership in 1972, the Socialist People's Party was the only party in parliament to campaign against EC membership and was a co-founder of the People's Movement against the EC.

During Ømann's time as chairman in the 1970s environmental issues began to attract attention when the Left Socialists adopted an environmental policy. At first, the Socialist People's Party was skeptical but pressure from party members made the party adopt an environmental policy of its own.

Ømann's wish for cooperation with the Social Democrats was not universally supported inside the party where some members wanted a more critical line towards the center-left and more emphasis on appealing to extra-parliamentary organisations.

In 1974, Gert Petersen, who was seen as more left-wing than Ømann, took over as chairman.

Party political offices
Preceded by Aksel Larsen	Leader of the Danish Socialist People's Party; 1968 – 1974	Succeeded by Gert Petersen
