= Guide to Nordic Bibliography =

English language guide to Nordic literature

- Editor: Erland Munch-Petersen
- Genre: Bibliography
- Publication date: 1984
- ISBN: 9788200709336

The Guide to Nordic Bibliography is a major English-language guide to the literature of the Nordic countries published by the Nordic Council of Ministers in 1984. Two supplements were issued, extending its range up to 1990.

The bibliography was a collaboration between five Nordic library schools which aimed to present the national bibliographies and essential subject bibliographies of the Nordic countries, Denmark, Finland, Iceland, Norway and Sweden, to an international audience. The general editor was Erland Munch-Petersen of the University of Gothenburg and the work was modelled on A guide to Danish Bibliography, compiled by Munch-Petersen and published by the Royal School of Librarianship, Copenhagen, in 1965.

== Volumes ==
- Guide to Nordic Bibliography. Nordic Council of Ministers, Copenhagen, 1984. ISBN 978-87-7303-080-6
- Guide to Nordic Bibliography. Supplement 1, 1983-1986. Bibliotekscentralens Forlag, Copenhagen, 1988. ISBN 9788755215481
- Guide to Nordic Bibliography. Supplement 2, 1987-1990. Bibliotekscentralens Forlag, Copenhagen, 1992. ISBN 9788755219724
