= Thøger Thøgersen =

Danish politician (1885–1947)

Chairman of the Communist Party of Denmark
- In office 1927–1929

Personal details
- Born: 24 February 1885 Viborg, Denmark
- Died: 9 December 1947 (aged 62) Copenhagen, Denmark
- Party: Communist Party of Denmark

Thøger Thøgersen (24 February 1885 – 9 December 1947) was a Danish politician who headed the Communist Party of Denmark for two years between 1927 and 1929. He was dismissed from the party in 1931 and was forced to exile in Moscow. He returned to Denmark in 1936 and was readmitted to the DKP. During the occupation of Denmark by Nazi Germany he was imprisoned in the Stutthof concentration camp.

== Early life ==
He was born Thøger Ingvard Marius Thøgersen in Viborg on 24 February 1885. His younger brother, Marius (1888–1944), was also a revolutionary.

Thøger Thøgersen was educated as a saddle maker in his home town and became chairman of the social democratic youth association in 1902. Later he settled in Copenhagen where he was employed as a trained worker. He also worked in Germany for a brief period.

== Career and activities ==
Thøgersen and Marie Nielsen established the Socialist Workers' Party in 1918 which later merged with Left Socialist Party. Then the party was renamed as Communist Party (DKP). Thøgersen and Nielsen were leading figures of the frequent demonstrations and strikes in Denmark between 1918 and 1925.

Thøgersen was the DKP chairman from 1927 to 1929, but he was expelled from the party in August 1931. The same year he was sent to Moscow. After his return in 1936, he rejoined the party work becoming a member of its central committee. He also worked for the DKP's newspaper Arbejderbladet.

Thøgersen was arrested in 1938 with Richard Jensen due to his involvement in the bombing of the Spanish trawlers in Frederikshavn. Thøgersen was acquitted in July 1941, but he was not released from prison. He spent two more years in various prisons and was again dismissed from the DKP. From Autumn 1943 to the end of World War II, he was prisoned in the Stutthof concentration camp. After the war, he was freed and was made a member of the DKP, but remained completely silent in the public debate.

== Death ==
Thøgersen was badly injured during his time at the Stutthof concentration camp and died in Copenhagen as result of his deteriorating health on 9 December 1947.
