= Knud Jespersen =

Danish politician (1926–1977)

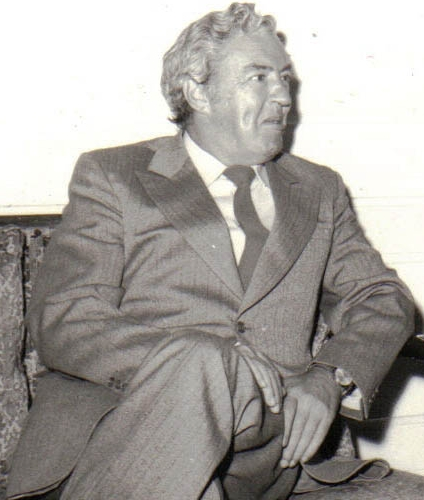
Knud Jespersen

Knud Jespersen (12 April 1926 – 1 December 1977) was a Danish politician. Jespersen served as chairman of the Communist Party of Denmark between 1958 and 1977 and was a member of parliament between 1973 and 1977.

== Childhood ==
Jespersen was born in Sulsted and grew up in northern Jutland. His mother worked as a domestic servant. Jespersen was raised by his grandparents, until he moved in with his mother and her husband at the age of thirteen.

== In the Resistance ==
During his teenage years Jespersen joined the resistance movement against the German occupation of Denmark. Both his mother and stepfather were members of the Communist Party. Following the 'police action' against the Communist Party on 22 June 1941, the entire household joined the underground resistance. In 1942, Jespersen himself became a member of the Communist Party. Both Jespersen and his stepfather were arrested and held in concentration camps. His stepfather, Christian Andersen, was arrested by the Gestapo in a raid on the family residence in December 1943. He died in the Neuengamme concentration camp a year later. Jespersen arrested on 27 March 1945 and was detained at the Frøslev Prison Camp. Jespersen was scheduled to be transferred to Germany, but was released after the Liberation on 5 May 1945.

== Trade unionist ==
After the war Jespersen became a trade union activist. Following his release he began to work as a casual labourer. He was elected local union chairman of warehouse workers in Aalborg in 1953. During the strike movements of the spring of 1956, he became known as an agitator.

== Communist Party leader ==
He became the chairman of the Communist Party district organization of North Jutland County in 1951. In 1952 he became a member of the Central Committee of the party. He was elected to the Aalborg municipal council in 1954. When the Communist Party chairman Aksel Larsen was ousted from the party in 1958 Jespersen was named the new party chairman at the 20th party congress. Jespersen's ascent to the party leadership had already been signaled a few months earlier, when the party substituted Larsen for him as the head of the delegation to the congress of the League of Communists of Yugoslavia.

As the leader of the Communist Party Jespersen reaffirmed the pro-Moscow line of the party, positioning the Danish party as one staunchest supporters of the Soviet Union in the European communist movement. He was an outspoken opponent of the Eurocommunist trend. However, during the 1968 Warsaw Pact intervention in Czechoslovakia he did express certain reservations (albeit no outright condemnation) of the Soviet actions. He did also condemn repression against Charta 77 signatories in Czechoslovakia in 1977.

== Parliamentarian ==
During the 1960s the Communist Party was marginalized in Danish politics. However, in 1973 the party experiences something of a short-lived revival during the run-up to the referendum on the European Economic Community. The party regained parliamentary representation and Jespersen was elected to parliament from the Bispeeng constituency in Copenhagen. As a parliamentarian Jespersen gained the reputation of being a sharp and humoristic speaker.

== Death ==
Due to health reasons Jespersen was replaced in the party leadership by Ib Nørlund, who took over as acting chairman and parliamentary faction leader, on 26 November 1977. Jespersen had endured torture during his captivity during the war, and his health had never fully recovered from those episodes. He died a few days later. The Communist Party of the Soviet Union was represented at Jespersen's funeral by Augusts Voss, secretary of the Communist Party of Latvia. Following Jespersen's death Jørgen Jensen was named new party chairman. Following Jespersen's death the electoral performance of the Communist Party plummeted (the party lost all of its parliamentary seats in the 1979 election), suggesting that Jespersen's charismatic leadership had contributed to previous electoral fortunes.

In 1979 a collection of Jespersen's speeches and articles were published in the book Knud Jespersen - en af arbejderklassens sønner: udvalgte taler og artikler ('Knud Jespersen, a son of the working class: selected speeches and articles'). In 1978 a Soviet merchant ship was named Knud Jespersen in his honour.
