= Aksel Larsen =

Danish politician (1897–1972)

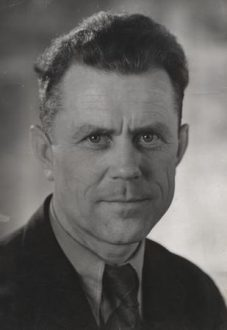

Leader of the Socialist People's Party
- In office 1959–1968
- Preceded by: Office established
- Succeeded by: Sigurd Ømann

Leader of the Communist Party of Denmark
- In office 1932–1958
- Preceded by: Thøger Thøgersen
- Succeeded by: Knud Jespersen

Member of Folketinget
- In office 1932–1941
- In office 1945–1972

Minister without Portfolio
- In office 5 May 1945 – 7 November 1945
- Prime Minister: Vilhelm Buhl
- Preceded by: Office established
- Succeeded by: Office abolished

Personal details
- Born: 5 August 1897 Brændekilde, Odense Municipality, Denmark
- Died: 10 January 1972 (aged 74)
- Resting place: Fredens Kirkegård, Odense, Denmark
- Party: Socialist People's Party
- Other political affiliations: Communist Party of Denmark, Social Democrats, Communist Party of the Soviet Union
- Spouse: Gerda Larsen
- Education: International Lenin School

Aksel Larsen (5 August 1897 – 10 January 1972) was a Danish politician who was chairman of the Communist Party of Denmark (DKP), and chairman and founder of the Socialist People's Party. He is remembered today for his long service in the Communist Party of Denmark, for his time as a concentration camp inmate at Sachsenhausen, and for being the founder of the Socialist People's Party.

Initially a Social Democrat and then a Trotskyist, Larsen came to support Stalinism, and defended the Soviet Union's policies during the early and middle parts of his career. He became leader of the Communist Party in 1932, and was elected to Folketinget (the lower chamber of Danish parliament Rigsdagen) in 1932. Together with other Danish communists, Larsen had to go into hiding in 1941 when the Danish police began arresting all party members. After the liberation at the end of World War II, Larsen became a minister in the liberation cabinet and subsequently led his party to its best-ever result in the 1945 election, in which it took one in eight votes. The election, however, resulted in a Liberal government, and Larsen's party was mostly shunned by the other party leaders.

After the Hungarian Revolution of 1956, Larsen condemned the Soviet Union's action. This led him into conflict with the members of the party leadership who had a greater loyalty to Moscow; a conflict that ended with his expulsion in November 1958. Larsen's reaction was to establish the Socialist People's Party (Socialistisk Folkeparti, abbreviated SF), which, thanks to Larsen's personal popularity, entered parliament at the 1960 election at the expense of the Communists, who from then on played only a very peripheral role in Danish politics.

Larsen himself was highly respected among politicians, especially in his later years, even if his party was seen as somewhat irresponsible. He was the leader of the Socialists until 1968 when he handed this over to Sigurd Ømann, and he remained an MP until his death in 1972.

In 2005, the Danish Institute for International Studies concluded that Larsen held a secret working relationship between 1958 and 1964 with one of Denmark's allied partners in the Cold War, stating that "Larsen... obviously was an agent of a Western intelligence service."

== Early life ==
Aksel Larsen was born as the fourth child of a clog maker in Brændekilde (now part of Odense Municipality) in 1897. Since his family was poor and had six children to support, it was only due to several scholarships that he got a lower secondary school exam. When he had finished school he was hired as an apprentice at the railway company Sydfyenske Jernbaner, which also hired him as a railway worker in 1917 when he had finished his apprenticeship. However, Larsen wanted to live in a larger city, and in 1918 he moved to Copenhagen.

== Early political career ==
=== Time as a Social Democrat ===
When he arrived in Copenhagen, he moved into an attic and got a job as a bicycle delivery man. He joined the Social Democratic Party, the party his parents had been members of for many years, and the Delivery Men's Union where he became shop steward. Through his political and union work he learned about syndicalism and the growing opposition to the Social Democratic Party in the labour movement.

His views grew more radical and he took part in violent riots on the vegetable market in 1918. The Easter Crisis of 1920 when king Christian X dismissed the cabinet of Carl Theodor Zahle became a turning point for Larsen. During the crisis, Larsen spoke in public on City Hall Square in Copenhagen. While parts of the Social Democratic Party supported the abolition of the Danish monarchy, party leadership and the Danish Confederation of Trade Unions accepted a compromise and the crisis was called off. This compromise disappointed Larsen, and the following month he left the Social Democratic Party and joined the newly formed Left Socialist Party.

He campaigned for the Left Socialist Party as a public speaker in the September 1920 election, but the election result of only 0.4% of the vote was a disappointment to Larsen.

=== The early years as a communist ===
As Larsen had been enthusiastic about the revolutions in Russia in 1917 and Germany in 1918, he supported the decision of the Left Socialist Party to join the Comintern in November 1920 and the decision to rename the party "The Communist Party of Denmark – Section of the Communist Internationale" (abbreviated DKP). He gained a reputation for being a good agitator and organiser and rose in party ranks. He became chairman of the inner city branch of the Copenhagen part of the party, and member of the party leadership for Greater Copenhagen.

In 1922 the party split in two due to internal faction struggles. Larsen was party secretary of one of the two parties, the so-called "Blågårdsgade party". However, he left the party leadership when the two parties merged back together in 1923. During the 1924 election, his campaigning made him so well known that he got a secret offer to go back to the Social Democrats. He refused the offer and continued to campaign for the communists, who suffered a defeat in the election.

=== The International Lenin School ===
When the Communist Party of Denmark got an offer from the Comintern in 1925 to send a party member to Moscow to attend the new Lenin courses, Larsen was chosen to go. The courses were created to educate loyal leaders to the international branches of the Comintern and was planned to last for eight months. The courses were in German, English, Russian or French so the student the party was to send to Moscow had to have good language skills. His secondary education gave Larsen a head start, and in September 1925 he left Denmark for Moscow.

In Moscow Larsen was enrolled at the West University for students from the Baltics, Poland, and Belarus. After six months in Moscow, he was transferred to the International Lenin School, where the courses had been expanded to last for two years.

During that time, Joseph Stalin's purges of Leon Trotsky and the left opposition in the Communist Party of the Soviet Union (CPSU) were at their height. Larsen became a member of the CPSU and sided with the opposition to Stalin. Larsen was prompted for a repudiation of his previous views after Stalin's victory at the 1927 party congress and the subsequent banishment of Trotsky to Alma Ata, but it was only after severe pressure that he complied. However, the repudiation did not prevent Larsen from being expelled from the International Lenin School in April 1928 and banished to Nizhny Novgorod.

However, the Communist Party of Denmark requested that Larsen be allowed to return to Denmark, and on 1 February 1929 Larsen left the Soviet Union.

=== Back in Denmark ===
Aksel Larsen had become unpopular both in the Communist Party of Denmark and in Moscow due to his opposition to Stalin. In spite of that and in spite of the Comintern's recommendations that Larsen should not be allowed to hold any office for the time being, Larsen was elected party secretary for Copenhagen because of a lack of talented people in the party.

The party was torn by internal struggles, and the 1929 election was a historic defeat for the communists. They only received 3,656 votes equal to 0.2% of the total votes. The internal disagreements were only worsened by the Comintern's decision in the start of 1930 to send a German representative of its Executive Committee to Denmark to reconcile the factions of the party. The Comintern demanded that the Danish party were to follow the militant ultra-left line decided at the sixth Comintern congress and a crackdown on the "danger from the right".

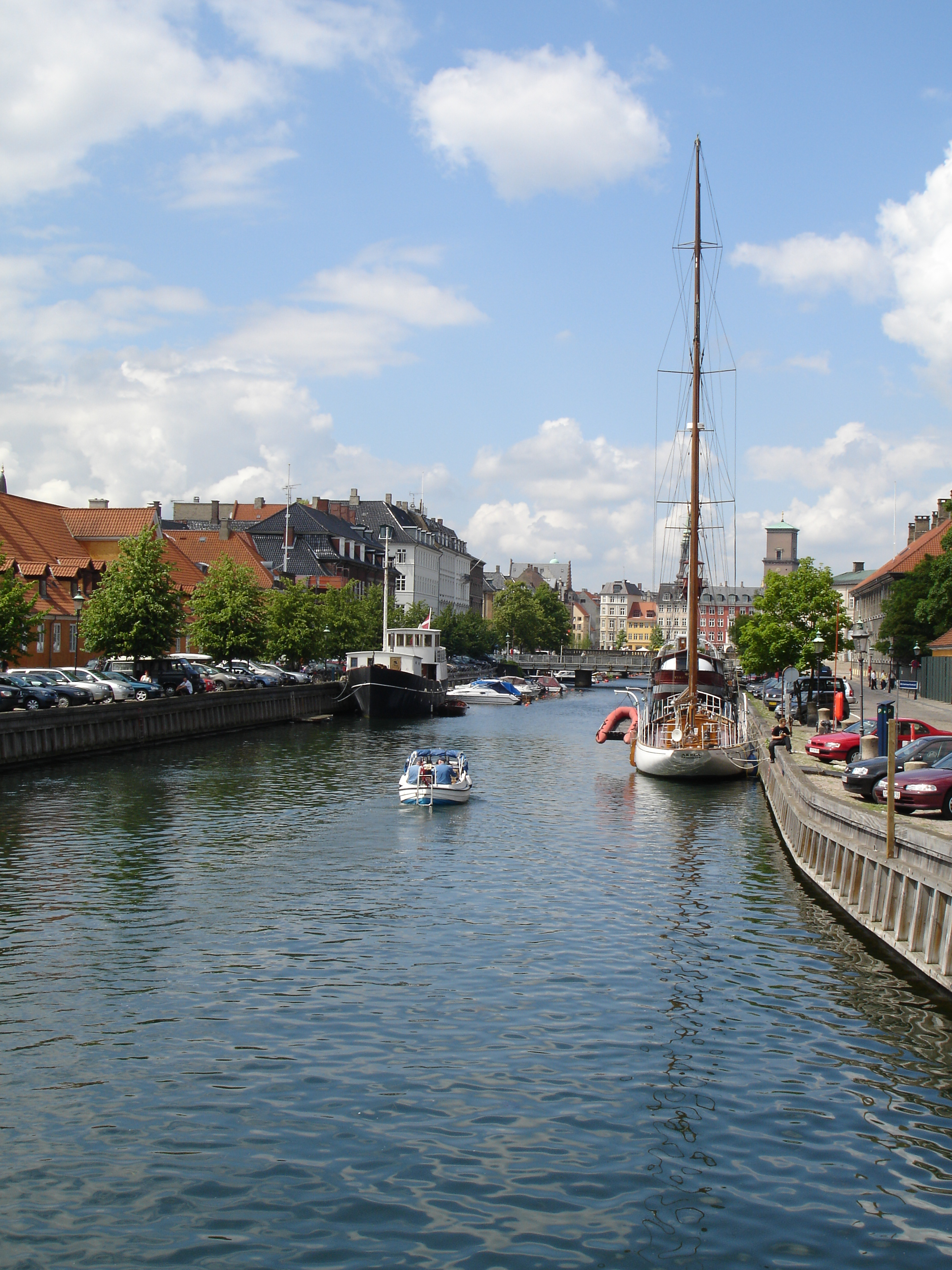
Frederiksholms Kanal around Slotsholmen, where Larsen gave his row boat speech in 1931.

The two main combatants of the internal struggle were Aksel Larsen and Thøger Thøgersen (da), but Larsen gained the upper hand by leading and organising the rapidly growing movement of the unemployed. In March 1930, Larsen was elected chairman of the National Committee of the Unemployed by more than 100,000 unemployed people who had gathered in Copenhagen. He became famous for giving a speech on 9 October 1931 from a row boat in the canals around Slotsholmen while evading the police's attempts to arrest him.

The movement of the unemployed was the greatest mass movement in the party's history. Party membership increased, as did circulation of the party newspaper. In the 1932 election, the communists got 1.1% of the vote and Aksel Larsen and Arne Munch-Petersen (da) became the first two communist members of parliament. Although the Comintern still mistrusted Larsen for his Trotskyist past, the success of the movement of the unemployed and the electoral success prevented them from blocking the election of Larsen as party chairman at the 1932 party congress.

== Chairman of the Communist Party ==
=== Opposition to Moscow ===
Larsen had an ability to translate the strange and alien decrees of the Comintern to Danish conditions, and his oratorical skills contributed greatly to the successes in organising the unemployed and gaining seats in parliament. In parliament, he became known as a great orator. He did not keep to translating the Comintern policies but also modified them. The ultra-left line was softened, and contrary to the directions from Moscow he warned his party members of seeing the Social Democrats as the main enemy (see social fascism).

Larsen wanted to develop a Danish variant of communism and these sentiments grew after the seventh Comintern congress had adopted the popular front strategy aiming for a close cooperation with the Social Democrats. While he did not want to make the Social Democrats the main enemy, their unsympathetic views towards the communists made Larsen doubt that cooperation was possible. Instead, Larsen was in favour of developing a popular front with the Social Liberal Party. With the exception of Arne Munch-Petersen, who had become the Danish representative of the Executive Committee of Comintern after losing his seat in parliament in 1935, the party leadership supported this course.

The Comintern grew worried about the Danish party and the Trotskyist past of its chairman, and as more and more disagreements arose, correspondence between Larsen and Moscow grew increasingly harsh. The Comintern lost its patience with Larsen and called him to Moscow for negotiations after he had published two articles against increased military spending. Not only had Larsen published the articles without clearing them with Moscow; he had also expressed views in contradiction to Soviet interests. Because of its position, Denmark is the gate to the Baltic Sea, and a strong Danish defense would prevent Nazi Germany for using Denmark as a bridgehead for an attack on the Soviet Union.

=== Surviving Stalin's purges ===
Although Larsen wanted more independence in developing the DKP's policies, he was not critical of the Soviet Union. At this time in his career, he was a loyal defender of Joseph Stalin and the Soviet Union. Even though they affected many of his former friends from his International Lenin School stay in the 1920s, and even though he did not believe in all the accusations, he defended the Great Purge and the Moscow trials.

On 20 May 1937, Larsen arrived to a Moscow marked by fear, anti-Trotskyist propaganda and mass hysteria. Many of his old acquaintances had either disappeared or did not dare to meet him. The negotiations with the Comintern developed into a political trial against Larsen, who had still not been forgiven for his Trotskyist past. Although he defended the Danish party line he was pressured into signing a declaration that the DKP would follow the popular front strategy. He was not allowed to leave Moscow before he convinced the Comintern that he had to go home to look after his wife who was sick with cancer and to tend to his work in parliament.

His seat in parliament is likely to have saved his life. It is suggested that the Soviet Interior Ministry had planned to arrest Larsen, but general secretary Georgi Dimitrov of the Comintern did not want to arrest a member of a foreign parliament and intervened. Arne Munch-Petersen, who had been part of the negotiations with Larsen, did not have that protection and was arrested on 26 July 1937. After three weeks of torture and interrogations, he confessed to Trotskyist activity and was imprisoned. He died of tuberculosis in 1940 in Butyrka prison.

Aksel Larsen and the leadership of the Communist Party got the news about Arne Munch-Petersen's arrest in January 1938. Although they were shocked, they saw no way of helping him without seriously damaging the relationship with Moscow. Because of this, they concealed their knowledge, not only to the public but also to his wife and family.

=== Enacting the popular front policy ===
Larsen and the DKP complied with the orders from Moscow and began working for the popular front policy. In March 1938 following Adolf Hitler's takeover of Austria in the Anschluss, Larsen held a speech in which he used a more patriotic rhetoric than before and warned that Denmark could suffer the same fate. After the speech, the communists urged the Social Democrats and the Social Liberal Party to join them in a popular front. In a letter to the Social Democratic leader and prime minister Thorvald Stauning, Larsen promised "the most unconditional and loyal support".

The new party line culminated on the 1938 party congress where Larsen delivered one of his most important speeches. He declared that the Communist Party was both a Danish and a democratic party and put great emphasis on his party's wishes for unity in the labour movement. The popular front policy garnered supporters outside traditional communist constituencies, and since the communists used the charismatic Larsen to personify their policies, he became increasingly popular. However, the Social Democrats refused to cooperate with the communists.

In spite of the popularity of both Larsen and the popular front, voter support for the party was small. Although the communists got 2.4% of the vote in the 1939 election and went from two to three seats in Folketinget, the increase was much smaller than they had hoped for, which was a great disappointment to Larsen. The communists were further disappointed by the 1939 constitutional referendum two months later, where they had campaigned in favour of the new constitution which was not passed.

=== World War II: Resistance movement and Sachsenhausen ===
The popular front policy crumbled with the signing of the Molotov–Ribbentrop pact on 23 August 1939. Despite being confused about the pact, Larsen defended Stalin's decision. The German invasion of Poland on 1 September and Stalin's invasion of Poland on 17 September and the following partition of Poland between Hitler and Stalin caused more confusion in the communist movement, as the former image of the Soviet Union as a "bulwark against fascism" now fell.

The situation was difficult but Larsen did his best to defend the Soviet Union. This put him under a great deal of stress and in September he asked the party secretariat and later the Comintern for permission to resign as chairman. These requests were denied, as it was feared that a change in leadership would increase strain on the party. Larsen raised the issue again when the Soviet Union laid pressure on Finland to evacuate Karelia but was turned down once more. The Soviet attack on Finland on 30 November 1939 and the Winter War created great public sympathy for Finland in the Danish public. By contrast, the communists were despised for their support of the Soviet Union, and Larsen became the target of public disdain. Shortly after the beginning of the war, the entire Folketing walked out in protest when Larsen mounted the podium.

The peace between Finland and the Soviet Union removed some of the stress on the party, but on 9 April 1940 Denmark was occupied by Germany. Larsen was in Moscow at the time, but on 22 April he managed to get back to Copenhagen with instructions for how to deal with the situation. At that time, the Communist Party of Denmark was still legal, but the Comintern, as well as Danish party leadership, was expecting that the party would soon be banned. The DKP were to try to remain a legal party for as long as possible, and use the time to prepare to go underground. In spite of these expectations, the Danish police took them by surprise when leading communists were arrested on 22 June 1941. The party as well as the communist ideology was banned two months later on 22 August when parliament passed the Communist Law.

Larsen managed to avoid capture and went into hiding. He and the party continued its political work as part of the resistance movement, with an illegal publication against the ban on communism and an open letter to prime minister Thorvald Stauning on 20 August 1941. In January 1942, Larsen was a co-founder of the resistance organisation "Frit Danmark" (da) (lit. "A Free Denmark") which circulated an illegal publication of the same name.

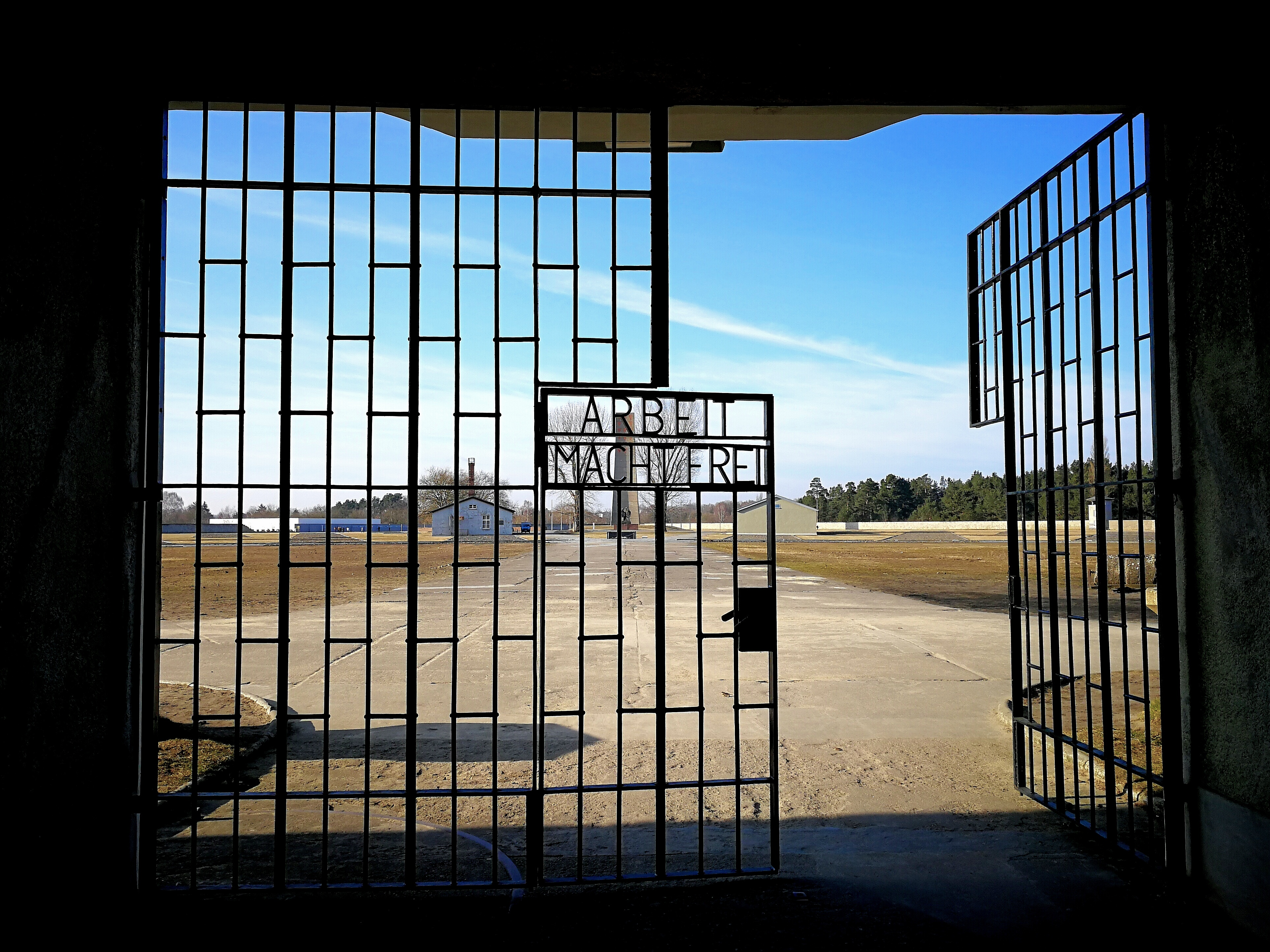
Aksel Larsen was captured in 1942 and sent to Sachsenhausen.

The next month, Larsen chaired a party leadership meeting, where it was decided that the DKP were to take part in sabotage against the German occupiers. Larsen never got the possibility to be a part of the sabotage work, as he was arrested by Danish police on 5 November 1942, and incarcerated at Vestre Fængsel. There he was given over to the Germans who transferred him to the Sachsenhausen concentration camp on 28 August 1943. There he was confined to a solitary cell isolated from the rest of the camp by a high wall with electrified barbed wire.

=== After the war ===
Aksel Larsen survived the concentration camp and was saved by Sweden in April 1945 by count Folke Bernadotte's White Buses. On 5 May he returned to Denmark and was hailed as a hero of the resistance. The war had turned the public image of the communist movement upside down, with the Soviet Union being credited for its efforts in the war, and the DKP being credited for its involvement in the resistance movement.

In the months after the liberation, Larsen was marked by his stay in the concentration camp and did not play a great role in politics. The DKP was given seats in the liberation cabinet, where Larsen became minister without portfolio. While he recovered from his stay in Sachsenhausen, he let Alfred Jensen lead the party. The 1945 election on 15 September was the best ever for the communists. They got 12.5% of the vote and 18 seats in parliament. With 27,497 votes, Larsen himself was the candidate who received the most personal votes.

The friendly relations between Social Democrats and communists that had existed right after the liberation soon disappeared and the old fronts from before the war started to re-emerge. The Danish communists became the target of public disdain once more with the onset of the Cold War and the Czechoslovak communist coup in 1948 combined with new purges and trials in the Soviet Union and its new Eastern European satellite states. Larsen once more showed himself to be a defender of the Soviet Union.

Although the Comintern had been disbanded in 1943, he frequently sought the advice of the Soviet embassy in Copenhagen and the CPSU. His loyalty to Moscow was strong, and he gained a reputation for being "one of Scandinavia's most reliable and trusted Stalinists" after he helped to purge Norwegian communist leader Peder Furubotn.

Although he had abandoned his idea of a Danish variant of communism, Larsen still managed to translate the Soviet party line to Danish realities. His skills as an orator and public debater helped slow down the decline in voter support but was not able to stop it. As the Cold War worsened, the DKP became increasingly isolated.

Controversy arose in March 1949 when Gestapo protocols from the interrogations of him during the war was printed by the conservative newspaper Nationaltidende. He was accused of having given the Germans too much information and for having betrayed his comrades in the resistance. He was defended by his party and by veterans of the resistance, but the interrogation protocols were used against him by his political opponents for many years after.

During a 1951 stay in Moscow, Larsen learned that Arne Munch-Pedersen had died in 1940. Although the case continued to emerge in the media and in parliament, Larsen kept silent and denied any knowledge of Munch-Pedersen's fate.

Although the Cold War was a stressful period to Larsen, he mostly kept to his communist creed. The first traces of doubt came shortly after Stalin's death when all defendants of the Doctors' Plot trials were rehabilitated because their confessions had been made under torture. Larsen's doubt was however short-lived, and he was only strengthened in his views by Nikita Khrushchev's thaw both inside the Soviet Union and internationally. A strike at a Philips plant and an increase in party membership, combined with a stronger communist presence in the trade unions, convinced Larsen that the party had a bright future.

=== The last years as a communist ===
Although he attended the 20th congress of the CPSU in 1956, Larsen did not personally hear Khrushchev's "Secret Speech". He first learned about it when it was reported by The New York Times on 16 March. Larsen read the speech at the Soviet embassy and proposed a party line more independent of Moscow.

The collective bargaining negotiations of 1956 and a general strike had strengthened the DKP, and Larsen got his party's support to pursue a more independent line. However his plans reached farther and he persuaded Mogens Fog to re-join the party to help transform it to a "broad, national, socialistic party".

The positive situation for the Danish communists changed dramatically with the Soviet invasion of Hungary in October 1956. Once again the communists were disdained in public opinion and isolated politically. Internally, Larsen had to balance between the inner circle of the party, who were in favour of the invasion, and the party members and intellectuals, who were against. Internal tension grew and resulted in an extraordinary party congress in January 1957 where Aksel Larsen for the first time since 1932 delivered his annual report in his own name and not in the name of the central committee. The congress elected a new central committee and executive committee with a strong majority against Larsen's line.

The party was sitting on a powder keg of internal disagreement which could go off at any moment. The situation was triggered when the League of Communists of Yugoslavia invited a delegation from the Communist Party of Denmark to go to its 1958 congress. The CPSU and other communist parties had also accepted the invitation, but suddenly the CPSU decided to boycott the congress and pressured other communist parties not to send delegations either. Although Larsen's decision to go anyway was supported by the Danish executive committee, it was decided that Knud Jespersen and Børge Houmann were to go to Yugoslavia instead of Larsen.

Internal disagreements continued after the Yugoslav party congress, and on 8 July 1958 Larsen revived his ideas from the 1930s about a distinct Danish form of communism and urged the party leadership to change to a more independent course. Larsen now also thought that the Danish party should not necessarily support and defend the acts of the Soviet Union and the CPSU.

Fierce faction struggle arose and Larsen lost the party congress in October 1958. On 16 November 1958, it was announced in the communist newspaper Land og Folk that he had been expelled from the party.

== As CIA agent ==
The Danish Institute for International Studies (DIIS) concluded in 2005, that Larsen held a secret working relationship between 1958 and 1971 with one of Denmark's allied partners in the Cold War, stating that "Larsen... obviously was an agent of a Western intelligence service."

In the 2005 book Firmaets største bedrift historian Peer Henrik Hansen argues that Aksel Larsen was recruited by the U.S. Central Intelligence Agency (CIA). According to Hansen, Larsen had his first meetings with American agents in November 1958 in his own home. According to the newspaper Information, Larsen was offered information on sentiments among the party hard-liners if he would cause a split in the party. For years the CIA had a bugging device in the apartment of Alfred Jensen, the vice-chairman of the Communist Party of Denmark. From there they knew about the tensions in the party leadership.

According to Hansen, Aksel Larsen feared retaliation from the KGB and, suspecting the American agent of being a KGB assassin, brought a friend with a gun to the first meeting to act as bodyguard. Poul Dam, a party colleague of Larsen, has reported that he had made preparations to go into hiding in the case of a Soviet invasion. Hansen speculates that Aksel Larsen's cooperation with the CIA was part of a trade-off, where the CIA got information on communists and Larsen in return would be protected from the KGB.

Over eight years, Larsen conducted several meetings with the CIA where he gave information on the relationship between the Soviet Union and communist parties in other countries. He was asked if the Communist Party of Denmark was doing espionage work for the Soviets or if the party was preparing an illegal party apparatus. He denied direct knowledge about this, but told the agent that the party had turned down Soviet and East German requests for aid with espionage. According to some of Hansen's sources, Larsen was rewarded with vacations, dinners and money for his co-operation.

Larsen met with a CIA agent with connections to Radio Liberty. He told the Americans much about international communism, but were less keen to tell about Danish communists, especially how Moscow funded them. He stated several times that he would like to destroy his former party and others who did the Soviet Union's bidding.

According to Hansen, the Soviets knew about Larsen's cooperation with the CIA, as did Danish intelligence agencies who learned about the connections between Larsen and the CIA as soon as 1958. Although the CIA operation was illegal under Danish law, the Danish intelligence agencies promised not to intervene in return for transcripts of the debriefings.

== The SF years ==
After being expelled from the Communist Party (DKP) in 1958, Aksel Larsen founded the Socialist People's Party (SF).

=== Founding a new party ===
Although no longer a communist, Larsen was still a socialist. Ideas for a new political party was made public on 20 November 1958, and a preparatory committee with Larsen as its leader was created the day after. The Socialist People's Party (abbreviated SF) was registered with parliament on 24 November, and the party held its founding congress on 15 February 1959 in Copenhagen. Like the Communist Party it was "founded on the idea of Marxism", but contrary to the DKP the new party declared its loyalty to Danish parliamentary democracy and called for a peaceful path to socialism.

Leading up to the 1960 election, the Gallup polls were not favourable to the Socialist People's Party, but Larsen showed his command of the then-new medium of television, when he spoke to the viewers from a hospital bed after breaking his leg in a traffic collision. The new party gained 6.4% of the vote and 11 seats in parliament, while the communists lost all their six seats. As many of the members of SF were former communists, some members of the other parties believed the Socialist People's Party to be communists in disguise. Those suspicions cooled with time and the party gradually became accepted.

=== The Red Cabinet and last years in politics ===
In the 1966 election, the Socialist People's Party and the Social Democrats got a majority and there were talks about forming a coalition cabinet. However, the Socialist People's Party could not accept the demands made by the Social Democrats. Instead Jens Otto Krag of the Social Democrats formed a cabinet supported by the socialists and a joint contact committee between the two parties was formed. This committee was soon dubbed “The Red Cabinet” (da).

The Red Cabinet lasted until December 1967, when six of the 20 Socialist People's Party members voted against the Krag government's proposal to freeze a threshold payment. An extraordinary party congress was held, and although Larsen gained a majority for his political line, he had to resign from his posts as party leader and leader of the parliamentary group. However a split could not be avoided, and on 17 December the minority founded the new party called the Left Socialists. He was succeeded as chairman of the Socialist People's Party by Sigurd Ømann, and remained as member of parliament until his death.

== Personal life and death ==
Larsen married three times. He died on 10 January 1972 and is interred at Fredens Kirkegård in Odense.

=== Legacy ===
To his death Larsen stayed a controversial figure. Although he had gained acceptance with his new party, and although his supporters revered him and spoke about a special kind of socialism called "Larsenism", he was also accused of having betrayed his principles. He was criticised for having been one of the fiercest supporters of the Soviet Union, and for his concealment of Arne Munch-Petersen's fate. However, he was also a respected parliamentarian and one of Denmark's most popular politicians.

Larsen's attempts to develop a "Third Way" form of communism independent of the Soviet Union is viewed by some as one of the forerunners of eurocommunism.

He is one of the parliamentarians who has been commemorated by having his bust placed in the hallways of the Folketing.

== See also ==
- Popular socialism

Party political offices
Preceded by New office	Leader of the Danish Socialist People's Party; 1959 – 1968	Succeeded by Sigurd Ømann
Preceded by Thøger Thøgersen	Leader of the Communist Party of Denmark; 1932 – 1958	Succeeded by Knud Jespersen
Political offices
Preceded by New office	Minister without portfolio 5 May 1945 – 7 November 1945	Succeeded by Office abolished
