= Ole Sohn =

Danish politician and author

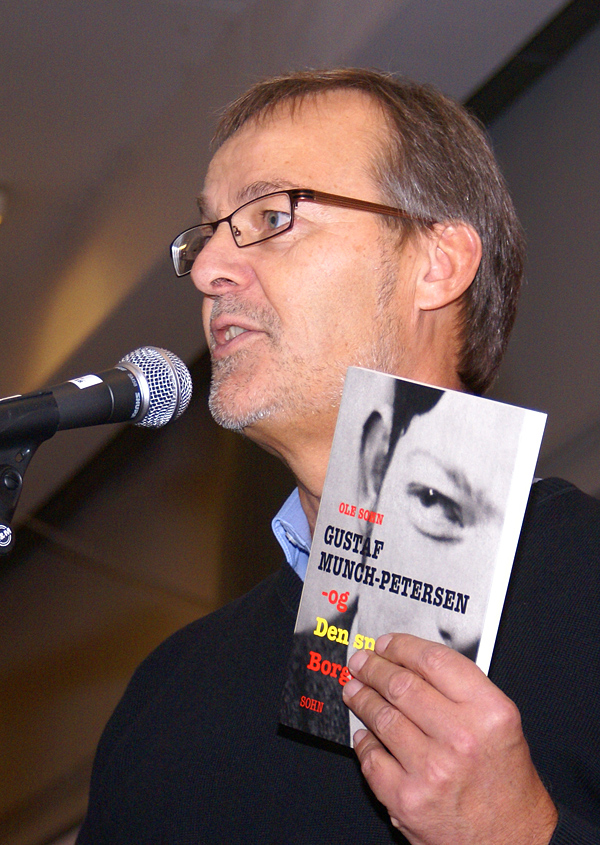

Minister for Business and Growth
- In office 3 October 2011 – 16 October 2012
- Preceded by: Brian Mikkelsen; Minister of Economic and Business Affairs
- Succeeded by: Annette Vilhelmsen

Leader of the Communist Party of Denmark
- In office 1987–1991
- Preceded by: Jørgen Jensen
- Succeeded by: Collective leadership

Member of Parliament
- In office 11 March 1998 – 2015

Personal details
- Born: 12 September 1954 (age 71) Torsted, Denmark
- Party: Social Democrats
- Other political affiliations: Communist Party of Denmark, Socialist People's Party
- Spouse: Inger Sohn

Ole Christian Liep Sohn (born 12 September 1954) is a Danish politician and author. He was a member of the Parliament of Denmark for the Social Democrats (until 2015) and was Denmark's Minister for Business and Growth until he announced his resignation on 12 October 2012.

Besides his political work, Sohn is an author and publisher. He has written several books on the Soviet Union, using material that has been released from Soviet archives after the breakup of the union. In 2004 he founded the publishing firm Forlaget Sohn. From the 1990s and onwards he has also been active in the Writers' Union.

== Early life ==
Ole Sohn was born in Torsted, in Horsens Municipality in Denmark in 1954. In the years 1970-1976 he worked as a ship's cook and an earth and concrete worker. In the years of 1972-1973 he took a Higher Preparatory Examination (HF) and later went to teacher's college.

Sohn started his political career young. When he took his HF he was spokesperson for the students during the years of 1972-1973. From the mid-1970s he served in several union offices, among those the central board of the Danish General Workers' Union.

== Political career ==
=== Danish Communist Party ===
Sohn was a member of the Communist Party of Denmark. From 1981 to 1991 he was a member of the party's central committee. He also served as a member of the Horsens city council from 1982 to 1984. From 1987 to 1989 he was a candidate for the parliamentary elections for the communists. From 1989 to 1991 he was a candidate on the ticket of the Red-Green Alliance which the communists had joined.

He was elected chairman of the communist party in 1987. This was a time of great internal disagreement, disagreements that would later split the party. In 1987 the communists choose to elect two chairmen instead of one. Sohn was elected chairman together with the trade unionist Jan Andersen who was a communist hardliner who viewed Mikhail Gorbachev's reforms with great skepticism. Sohn was elected to balance out Andersen as a young and dynamic candidate who could represent the Gorbachev faction of the party.

The election of two chairmen was meant to symbolize cooperation between the two factions of the party but Andersen died shortly after, leaving the young Sohn with the sole responsibility for settling the internal struggles in the party. Sohn had to deal with the great upheavals in the communist world in the late 1980s. However, he was too young to cope with the old hard-liners in the party. They won the power struggle and in 1990 they deposed him. This led to a party congress where the Sohn faction won and the party was split. However, a year after he left the communist party and joined the Socialist People's Party.

=== Socialist People's Party ===
Sohn was first elected to parliament on the ticket of the Socialist People's Party in the 1998 election and has been in parliament until 2015. After the 2011 election, Sohn became Minister for Business and Growth.

== Personal life ==
Ole Sohn is married to Inger Sohn. Together they have two children, Iben and Christian.

== Bibliography ==
- Fra Folketinget til celle 290 1992
- Et liv i kamp og kærlighed 1993
- Der var bud efter dem 1994
- Her kommer fra dybet den mørke armé 1995
- Den højeste straf 1996
- Frihedens port 1999
- Vanviddets logik 2000
- Rundt om filmen DEN HØJESTE STRAF 2001
- De drog mod øst 2002
- Gustaf Munch-Petersen – og den spanske borgerkrig, 2007
- Et liv i kamp og kærlighed, 2007
- Jeg kommer snart hjem, 2010, a book about a peasant family that emigrated to Siberia in 1910
- Fra Folketinget til celle 290, 2011, a book about Arne Munch-Petersen, a Danish communist that died as a result of Stalins purges

Party political offices
| Preceded by Jørgen Jensen | Chairman of the Communist Party of Denmark; 1987-1991 | Succeeded by Collective leadership |
