= Hans Munch-Petersen =

Hans Wilhelm Munch-Petersen (26 March 1869 - 8 September 1934) was a Danish scholar, jurist and author who pushed for legal reforms, more rights for women and other social justice issues in Denmark. His most influential work was Den danske Retspleje.

== Early life ==
Munch-Petersen was the son of the medical historian, Professor Julius Petersen and the brother of Jon Julius Munch-Petersen studied at the Metropolitan School in 1886, cand. jur. in 1891, and received the 1893 University Gold Medal for a forensic essay. His dissertation was Løftet og dets Causa (1896) He received his law degree in 1896.

His children were Arne and Erwin Munch-Petersen.

== Career ==
In 1896 Munch-Petersen became an assistant in the Department of Justice for the Government of Denmark. In 1899, he named a docent, in 1901 a university professor. In 1921, he was named university administrator and in 1923 university rector (Rector Magnificus). He left his position as rector in 1924.

From 1918 until 1922, Munch-Petersen was also chairman of the board of rent cases for Copenhagen and Frederiksberg. He also served on several government commissions including the universitets komimissionen from 1912 and the commission for the reform of military justice.

Influenced by reforms in Austria, Munch-Petersen advocated in his publications for legal reform in Denmark. Although not politically active, he wanted to transform the laws in a socialist spirit as described in his books. His social interests have also influenced his role as an arbitration judge in disputes between workers and employers.

== Legal papers ==
- Ugeskrift for Retsvæsen,
- Tidsskrift for Retsvidenskab ("Den saakaldte negative Kontraktsinteresse", XI, 1898)
- Tilskueren ("Procesret og Menneskeret", 1899) .
- Den borgerlige Ret i Hovedtræk (The Civil Court of Main) (1901, 5th edition 1921 plus 1922),
- Retstilfælde til Brug ved det juridiske Studium (Legal Cases to Use at the Law Study) (1901, 3rd edition 1922)
- Den danske Retspleje (IV, 1917–19, with the addition and professional register in 1919, 2nd edition 1923 et seq.), Retsplejeloven af 11 April 1916 (Procedural Laws of 11 April 1916).
- Den danske Lovgivning og den sociale Retfærdighed (The Danish Law and Social Justice) (1906)
- April 1916 med senere Tillægsbestemmelser, Henvisninger og udførligt Fagregister (1919) with Appendix (1922), and jurors. En almenfattelig Oversigt (1919). I
- Retsreformen med Hensyn til vor Strafferetspleje (1902),
- Den nye Retspleje belyst i sine Grundtræk (1908)
- Retspleje og Kultur (University Programme 1913),
- En danske Civilproces i Hovedtræk (In 1906, II 1908 III 1915 IV 1911 2nd edition, 1915)
- Sociale Retfærdighedskrav i dansk Lovgivning (Social Justice Demands in Danish Law)

Munch-Petersen also published articles in Tilskueren, Det ny Aarhundrede and especially Ugeskrift for Retsvæsen, whose literary department he edited 1906-20, and in its edition of Lov om Rettens Pleje (1908, 1909).

== Death and legacy ==
Munch-Petersen died on 8 September 1934. He is buried at the Western Cemetery. His grandson was the literary scholar and librarian Erland Munch-Petersen.
