= Cabinet of Poul Nyrup Rasmussen =

The Cabinet of Poul Nyrup Rasmussen can refer to 4 successive Danish cabinets formed by Prime Minister Poul Nyrup Rasmussen:

- The Cabinet of Poul Nyrup Rasmussen I (25 January 1993 - 27 September 1994)
- The Cabinet of Poul Nyrup Rasmussen II (27 September 1994 - 30 December 1996)
- The Cabinet of Poul Nyrup Rasmussen III (30 December 1996 - 23 March 1998)
- The Cabinet of Poul Nyrup Rasmussen IV (23 March 1998 - 27 November 2001)
