= Erland Munch-Petersen =

Danish literary scholar

Erland Munch-Petersen (28 March 1930 – 12 May 1997) was a Danish literary scholar and professor at the University of Gothenburg. He was the general editor of the Guide to Nordic bibliography.

== Biography ==
Munch-Petersen was born in Copenhagen, Denmark . He was the grandson of scholar and jurist Erland Munch-Petersen (1869-1934). His basic education was at the Holte Gymnasium. Munch-Petersen trained as a librarian from 1956. He gained his M.A. in general and comparative literature from the University of Copenhagen in 1962 and his Ph.D. in 1978 for his thesis on Romanens århundrede. Studier i den masselæste oversatte roman i Danmark 1800-1870.

From 1969, he was head of the Danmarks Biblioteksskole (now the Royal School of Library and Information Science). He was the general editor of the Guide to Nordic bibliography, published by the Nordisk Ministerrad in 1984. From 1991 to 1993 he was a professor at the University of Gothenburg.

== Selected publications ==
- Romantisk underholdning. 1970.
- Romanens århundrede. 1978.
- Guide to Nordic bibliography. Nordisk Ministerrad, Kobenhavn, 1984. (Editor) ISBN 9788773030806.
