= Green Left (Denmark) =

Left-leaning political party in Denmark

Green Left Socialistisk Folkeparti
- Abbreviation: SF; F (Note: Official party letter on voting ballot)
- Chairperson: Pia Olsen Dyhr
- Founder: Aksel Larsen
- Founded: 15 February 1959
- Split from: Communist Party of Denmark
- Headquarters: Christiansborg Palace, Prins Jørgens Gård, 1240 Copenhagen
- Youth wing: Popular Socialist Youth of Denmark
- Membership (2022): 8,995
- Ideology: Democratic socialism Green politics Popular socialism
- Political position: Centre-left to left-wing
- Regional affiliation: PSOM (historical)
- European affiliation: European Green Party
- European Parliament group: Greens–European Free Alliance
- International affiliation: Global Greens (associate)
- Nordic affiliation: Nordic Green Left Alliance
- Colours: Red; Green; Pink (customary)
- Folketing: 20 / 179 (Note: Only 175 of the 179 seats in the Danish parliament, the Folketing, are obtainable by Danish political parties as Greenland and the Faroe Islands are assigned two seats each due to their status as territories in the Kingdom of Denmark.)
- European Parliament: 3 / 15
- Regions: 15 / 205
- Municipalities: 248 / 2,436
- Mayors: 5 / 98

Election symbol
- F

Website
- sf.dk

The Green Left (Danish: Socialistisk Folkeparti; Danish: [soɕaˈlistisk ˈfʌlkʰəˌpʰɑˀtsi], lit. 'Socialist People's Party', abbr. SF) is a democratic socialist political party in Denmark. The SF was founded on 15 February 1959 by Aksel Larsen, a former leader of the Communist Party of Denmark (DKP), who was removed for criticizing the Soviet intervention in the Hungarian Revolution of 1956. Larsen aimed to create a third way between Denmark's US-oriented social democracy and Soviet-oriented communism, combining democracy with socialism. The SF entered the Folketing in the 1960 Danish general election, while the DKP lost its seats. The SF became involved in peace, anti-nuclear, and grassroots movements, advocating for independence from the Soviet Union.

Throughout the 1960s and 1970s, the SF experienced fluctuating electoral success, gaining significant influence in the peace and environmental movements. During Gert Petersen's period as leader from 1974 to 1991, the SF broadened its appeal, focusing on environmental and gender politics. The party's opposition to Denmark's entry into the European Economic Community in the 1972 referendum boosted its membership and support. In the 1980s, the SF reached its peak electoral success, with 27 seats in the Folketing but faced internal conflicts over European Union policies, resulting in fluctuating support.

In the 1990s and 2000s, the SF continued to play an influential role in Danish politics, supporting the Poul Nyrup Rasmussen government from 1993 to 2001. Led by Holger Nielsen, the SF opposed the 1992 Danish Maastricht Treaty referendum but supported the Edinburgh Agreement. The party saw mixed electoral results, gaining seats in some elections and losing in others. Villy Søvndal became party chair in 2005, shifting the SF further left and emphasizing professionalism, focus-groups, and media strategies. In 2007, SF doubled its seats, becoming the fourth-largest party.

The SF joined the coalition government led by Helle Thorning-Schmidt in 2011, marking its first participation in a cabinet; however, internal conflicts and controversies led to SF leaving the coalition in 2014. The SF under Pia Olsen Dyhr (the leader elected in 2014) supported the Mette Frederiksen-led Social Democrats minority government after the 2019 election. Despite the red bloc winning a narrow majority in 2022, the SF became the largest opposition party when Frederiksen formed a centrist government with the Liberal Party and the Moderates. At the 2026 election, the party finished in second place in both seats and votes for the first time in its history.

== History ==
=== 1959–1969 ===
The SF was founded on 15 February 1959 by Aksel Larsen, a former leader of the Communist Party of Denmark (DKP). Larsen was removed from the ranks of the DKP for his criticism over the Soviet intervention in the Hungarian Revolution of 1956. Larsen and the new SF sought to form a third way between Denmark's United States-oriented social democracy and Soviet Union-oriented communism, which sought to combine democracy with socialism. He was joined by a large share of the members of the DKP. They all supported the idea of independence from the Soviet Union.

In the 1960 Danish general election, the SF entered the Folketing with eleven seats. The DKP lost all six of its seats. In the 1964 Danish general election, the party lost one seat. During the 1960s, the SF became involved in the peace movement and the movements which opposed nuclear weapons and nuclear power. It sought to "walk on two legs", by combining its parliamentary work with involvement in grass roots movements.

In the 1966 Danish general election, the Social Democrats and the SF won a combined majority in Parliament, in which the SF doubled its number of seats from 10 to 20. A Social Democrat minority government was formed, which was supported by the SF. The cooperation lasted only one year, but led to considerable conflict within the SF: in 1967, the Left Socialists (VS) broke away from the SF. In the 1968 Danish general election, the SF lost nine seats and the VS entered parliament with four. In 1969, the party chairperson Larsen stood down; he was replaced by Sigurd Ømann.

=== 1969–1991 ===
In the 1971 Danish general election, the SF regained ground on the VS, gaining six seats, while the VS left the Folketing. In 1972, the party participated in the referendum campaign against Denmark's entry into the European Economic Community (EEC). The Danish voters voted in favour of the European by a narrow margin. Because of its opposition to the EEC, the SF's membership and support was boosted. In the 1973 Danish general election, the SF lost six seats (reducing the party's share to 11), and the DKP re-entered the Folketing with six seats. In 1974, Ømann stood down as party chairperson in favour of Gert Petersen. In the 1975 Danish general election, the SF lost two seats and the VS re-entered the Folketing as well. In the 1977 Danish general election, the party reached an all-time low with only seven seats.

During the 1970s, the SF began to change its program and electoral appeal. Where it had been a male-domined workers' party it became broader left-wing political party that was oriented towards new voters and new social movements. It became more focused on the environment and gender politics. In the 1979 Danish general election, the party won four seats as the DKP lost its six seats. In the 1981 Danish general election, the party almost doubled from eleven to twenty-one. In the 1984 Danish general election it remained stable. In the 1986 Danish Single European Act referendum, the SF campaigned together with the Social Democrats and the Social Liberal Party against the European Community. The Single European Act was adopted by a narrow margin. In the 1987 Danish general election, it reached its all-time peak with twenty seven seats.

In the 1988 Danish general election, the SF lost three seats. In the 1990 Danish general election, it lost another nine, leaving the party with fifteen seats. In 1991, the party chairman Petersen stood down in favour of Holger K. Nielsen. Between 1982 and 1993, a centre-right government led by Poul Schlüter formed by the Conservatives, the Liberals, and allies was in power, even though the SF formed a majority government with the Social Democrats and the Social Liberals. Combined with its links with the peace and environmental movement, this gave the SF the power to force alternative security and environmental policies.

=== 1991–2001 ===
In 1991, Petersen stood down as party chairman; he was replaced by Holger K. Nielsen who was (compared to the other candidate Steen Gade) closer to the party's socialist past. In the 1992 Danish Maastricht Treaty referendum, the SF campaigned for the "No" vote. The Danish people narrowly voted against the Maastricht Treaty. In 1993, the SF formed a historic compromise with the other parties in the Folketing. It accepted the concessions made to the Danes in the Edinburgh Agreement and to the SF in the National Compromise. Therefore, it campaigned to vote "yes" in the 1993 Danish Maastricht Treaty referendum. Just before the referendum in 1991, the SF's party congress had adopted a new program of action and principles, "Mod Nye Tider (Towards New Times)", which departed from the old anti-European Union (EU) line. As a group, the SF became more positive of the EU but also became increasingly divided on the issue.

In the 1994 Danish general election, the SF lost another two seats and the Red–Green Alliance an alliance, which included the DKP and the VS, entered Parliament with six seats. In the 1998 Danish general election, the party remained stable. During the 1998 Danish Amsterdam Treaty referendum, it led the "No" again, this time unsuccessfully as voters strongly voted in favour. Between 1993 and 2001, the SF supported a Social Democrats and Social Liberal minority government led by Poul Nyrup Rasmussen. In the 2000 Danish euro referendum, the SF was part of the successful "No" campaign.

=== In opposition, 2001–2011 ===
In the 2001 Danish general election, the SF lost one seat and after Liberal Party, the Conservative People's Party and the Danish People's Party gained a majority, it lost almost all political influence in Parliament. There were some local bright spots with great support to SF mayors in Vejle, Them, Nakskov, Kalundborg, and Maribo caused by charismatic candidates. In 2004, the party's sole MEP again decided to sit with The Greens–European Free Alliance group, instead of the European United Left/Nordic Green Left, leading to considerable internal conflict. The party has since then come around to her point of view, and in 2008, it was decided that future SF MEPs should sit in the Green Group, although at the time the SF was still only an observer in the European Green Party and not a full member.

In the 2005 Danish general election, the SF gained the worst election result since 1979, and lost yet another seat in parliament. On election night Holger K. Nielsen stepped down as party chairman in favour of a new chair. When Holger K. Nielsen announced that he would step down as chairman, three candidates for the post came forth: Pia Olsen Dyhr, Meta Fuglsang, and Villy Søvndal. At an at times chaotic process on the party congress resulted in the decision to hold a ballot among the party members to decide who should be chairman. Søvndal, running on a platform of moving the party further to the political left won the ballot with 60% of the vote. The election of Søvndal brought major changes to the party. Greater emphasis was placed on professionalism, the use of focus groups and a change in electoral strategy. The number of key issues was reduced to three to better penetrate in the media with fewer slogans.

In a 2006 internal referendum, 66% of the SF-members declared that the party should participate in the "yes"-camp in a referendum on the European Constitution, a historic break from its Eurosceptic past. In the 2007 Danish general election, the SF more than doubled its seats in parliament and became the fourth-largest party with increased support across the country. In itself this did not bring about any major change in political influence since the centre-right was able to maintain its majority; however, the increase in votes and members of Parliament brought optimism and new resources to the party. The media had also discovered Søvndal's ability to make an impact and gave him the opportunity to use that in many cases. The number of party members also greatly increased during this period.

At the 2006 party congress, Søvndal took exception to anti-democratic groups, mostly Hizb-ut-Tahrir using unusually harsh language. He repeated these statements on his blog in 2008 which led to great attention to the party and some internal criticism. Right-wing politicians praised Søvndal's statements and rhetoric, which caused insecurity in some parts of the party who felt they were being embraced by some of SF's main political opponents on the right. The polls during these months showed a constant rise in support for the party which combined with a decline in support for the Social Democrats showed an almost equal support to the two parties. For the first time ever some polls showed greater support for the SF than for the Social Democrats. In the spring of 2008, this changed so that the SF got 16% in the polls and the Social Democrats 23%. In 2008, SF voted in favour for the national budget for 2009. This was the first time the SF had voted in favour of a national budget by Anders Fogh Rasmussen's cabinet. This was widely regarded as an attempt to disprove the frequent accusations of SF not being "economically responsible".

=== In government, 2011–2014 ===
Before the 2011 Danish general election, the SF announced that its goal was to be part of a cabinet consisting of SF, the Social Democrats, and the Social Liberal Party. While the Social Democrats were positive to the idea the Social Liberals were initially more sceptical, due to differences in economic policies. This became a reality with the formation the Thorning-Schmidt I Cabinet: For the first time, the SF was part of a cabinet, with six cabinet ministers. In September 2012 Villy Søvndal announced that he was stepping down as chairman of the party. After a protracted election for the party chair Annette Vilhelmsen was elected chairwoman with 66% of the constituency, against the 34% achieved by her competitor Astrid Krag. Since Krag had the backing of most of the party leadership, Vilhelmsen's election was widely interpreted as a display of dissatisfaction with the leadership's approach to participating in government.

Vilhelmsen never managed to provide stable leadership for the party. In January 2014, the party left the coalition government over a dispute involving the sale of shares in the state-owned energy company DONG Energy to Goldman Sachs, stating that they would instead provide confidence and supply. Vilhelmsen and a considerable part of the party leadership subsequently resigned. Pia Olsen Dyhr was subsequently elected new chairman of the party. In the 2015 Danish general election, the SF lost more than half of its votes and achieved its worst result since 1977 with 4.2%.

=== Supporting the government, 2019–2022 ===
The 2019 Danish general election saw a victory for the red bloc consisting of the Social Democrats, the Social Liberals, the SF, the Red–Green Alliance, the Faroese Social Democratic Party, and Siumut. The SF received 7.7% of the vote, a 3.5% increase from 2015, netting them 14 seats. Following the results, Vice President Signe Munk stepped down to serve in the Folketing and Serdal Benli was elected to take Munk's place. Prior to the election, the SF spoke with leader of the Social Democrats Mette Frederiksen and brought a list of policy demands. These included strong climate action and the abolishment of the cash assistance ceiling, though the latter was abandoned during negotiations. Ultimately, it was decided that the Social Democrats would form a one-party minority government supported by the SF and the rest of the red bloc.

=== Return to opposition, 2022–2026 ===
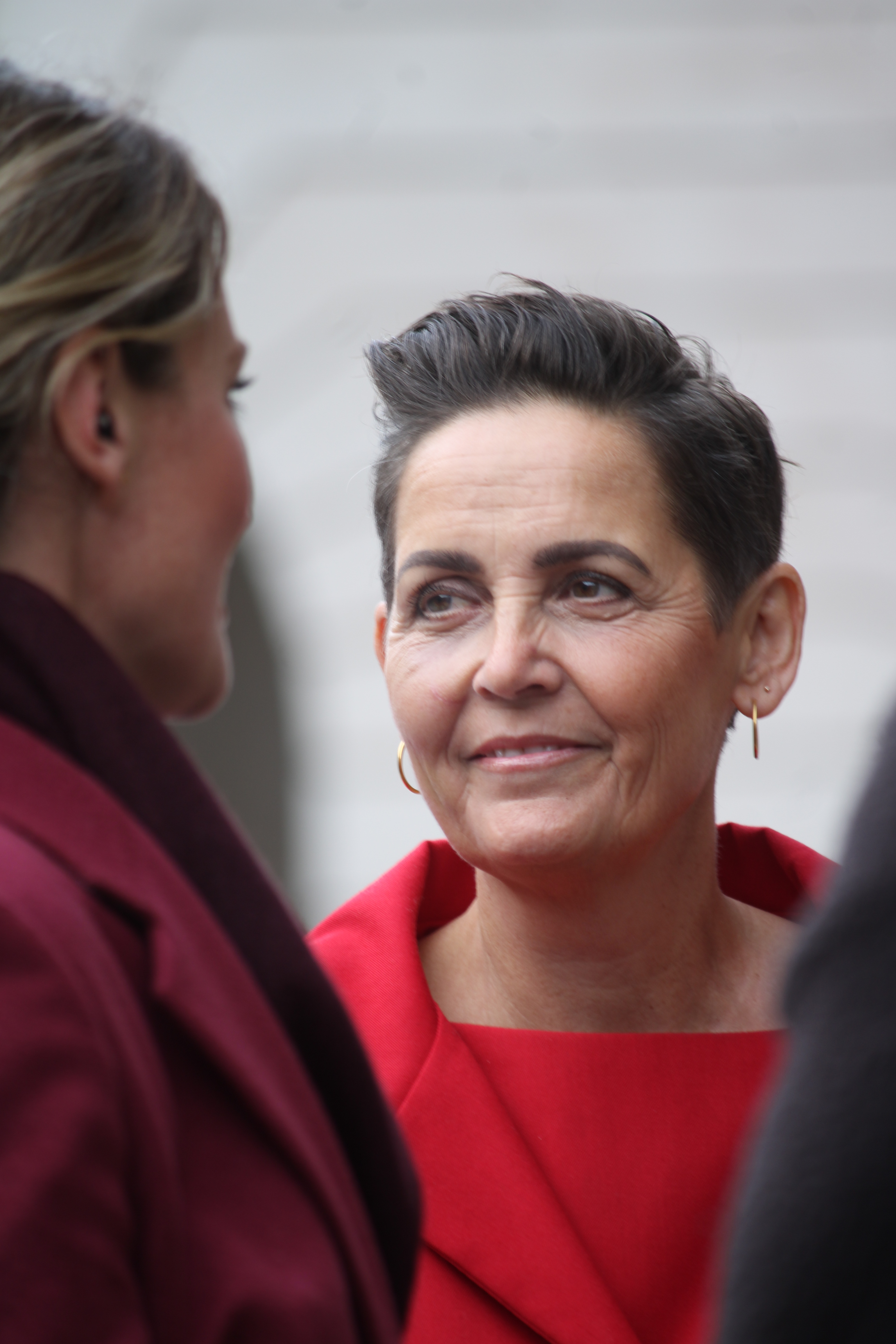
Pia Olsen Dyhr, the party leader since 2014

The red bloc government led by Frederiksen won a narrow majority in the 2022 Danish general election; however, both before and after the election, Prime Minister Frederiksen instead called for the formation of a grand coalition government with the centre-right Liberal Party as well as the newly formed centrist Moderates. The formation of this grand coalition make it the largest party in the opposition with 15 seats, an increase of one compared to the 2019 election.

On 20 March 2022, the party congress voted for the official English name of the party to be "Green Left", as the previous English name ("Socialist People's Party", a literal translation of the Danish name) sounded like Eastern Europe's former Communist parties. Party leader Pia Olsen Dyhr said after the vote, "It's reminiscent of the communist parties in Russia and China. And we have no interest in that. We are far from them. We actually arose as a reaction to them." The party abbreviation (SF) continues to be used by the party in all English language texts.

In the 2024 European Parliament election in Denmark, amid a rise in the polls, The SF won the most votes of any party, winning a national election in Denmark for the first time. The party elected 3 MEPs: Kira Marie Peter-Hansen, Rasmus Nordqvist, and Villy Søvndal. As a result of this success, Dyhr argued that the largest party in the red bloc should hold the Prime Minister of Denmark post. In December 2025, a Prime Minister from the SF over one from the Social Democrats was preferred by the Red–Green Alliance, although the Green Left stated they do not see themselves getting the position any time soon.

=== In government, 2026–present ===
In the 2026 Danish general election, the red bloc won a relative but not absolute majority, with her party becoming the second most voted party with 11.6% of the vote. As a result, the SF gained 5 seats, moving to 20 seats, and became the second-largest party in the Folketing for the first time in its history. Dyhr said of the party's "historic" success that the Danish people had provided it with a mandate and she was "ready to negotiate"; however, she made it clear that if welfare and the green transition were not prioritised, the party would remain in opposition.

== Ideology and issues ==
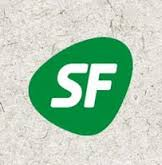
The green logo of SF representing green politics

The SF's ideological base is socialism, inspired by green politics and democratic socialism. The party sees a democratic-socialist Denmark as the end goal of its politics. The party is a strong supporter of feminism, human rights, the rights of minorities, and democracy. In its support for human rights it supports Danish recognition of a Palestinian state.

Other important issues for the SF are a globalization based on solidarity. To that extent, it seeks to reform the World Trade Organization, as well as environmental protection, and support feminism. The party is also critical of capitalism, with its principle program (adopted in 2012) arguing that "Danish society is characterized by a capitalist structure. Capitalism has created increased prosperity and productivity, but it has also created great inequality and social injustice, where a wealthy minority has the decisive control over the economy and production, and where many people are excluded and have no influence over their own lives. The main driving force in capitalist society is the private pursuit of profit, which entails a continuous risk of crises and puts constant pressure on society's social cohesion and natural foundations. The crises are further exacerbated by a wildly growing, detached financial sector, which becomes a drag on the productive sector. Globalization contains enormous opportunities, but also an unregulated capitalism that creates a casino economy where large banks and finance houses create financial instability. The SF works for a regulation of international capital flows and multinational companies."

=== European Union ===
Historically, the European Union (EU) has divided the party. The party was highly Eurosceptic during the 1990s, when the SF was the main architect of the four Danish "opt-outs" of the EU. When the EU began to implement policies oriented at regional development, environmental protection and social protection, the SF became more positive about the EU. In 2004 the party shifted towards a more pro-European stance. This EU-positive stance was emphasized in the 2022 Danish European Union opt-out referendum, where a broad coalition of Danish parties made a historic Defence-agreement that included. The SF recommended to abolish the opt-out they had been an architect of in the 1990s.

=== International comparison ===
The SF is a Nordic Green Left party like the Swedish Left Party, the Norwegian Socialist Left Party, the Finnish Left Alliance, and the Icelandic Left-Green Movement. These were also influenced by feminism and green politics in the 1970s and 1980s. Similar parties in Western Europe were the French Unified Socialist Party and the Dutch Pacifist Socialist Party. The party is part of the European Green Party, along with other environmentalist and eco-socialist parties such as Alliance 90/The Greens and Europe Ecology – The Greens.

=== Relationships to other parties ===
The SF has good relationships with the Social Liberal Party and the Social Democrats who in the past have cooperated in minority governments supported from the outside by the SF. The party does not explicitly rule out co-operation with the Red–Green Alliance.

== Organization ==
=== Structure ===
The party has a strong grass-roots organization: All members can participate in the party congresses but only delegates have voting rights. In May 2010, the party had 17,883 members.

=== Party chairperson ===
The chairman of the SF has always been its party leader, which can not be taken for granted in Danish party politics.

- Aksel Larsen, 1959–1968
- Sigurd Ømann, 1968–1974
- Gert Petersen, 1974–1991
- Holger K. Nielsen, 1991–2005
- Villy Søvndal, 2005–2012
- Annette Vilhelmsen, 2012–2014
- Pia Olsen Dyhr, 2014–present

=== Youth wing ===
The SF's youth organization is the Popular Socialist Youth of Denmark. The linked Socialist Popular Education Organisation organizes a yearly political summer meeting for members and non-members in Livø.

=== International affiliation ===
The SF is a member of the Nordic Green Left Alliance and the European Greens. Between 1979 and 1989, its MEPs sat in the Communist and Allies Group. Between 1989 and 1994, its sole MEP was member of the European United Left parliamentary group. Between 1994 and 1999, its sole MEP sat in the European Green Party group. Between 1999 and 2004, its sole MEP sat in the European United Left/Nordic Green Left group. After 2004 European elections, the SF's sole MEP Margrete Auken controversially chose to sit in the Greens-European Free Alliance group. The SF became a full member of the Global Greens in 2014.

== Election results ==
=== Parliament ===
Year	Leader	Votes	%	Seats	+/-	Government
1960	Aksel Larsen	149,440	6.1 (4th)	11 / 179	N/A	Opposition
1964	Aksel Larsen	151,697	5.8 (4th)	10 / 179	▼1	Opposition
1966	Aksel Larsen	304,437	10.9 (4th)	20 / 179	▲10	External support (1966–1967)
1966	Aksel Larsen	304,437	10.9 (4th)	20 / 179	▲10	Opposition (1967–1968)
1968	Aksel Larsen	174,553	6.1 (5th)	11 / 179	▼9	Opposition
1971	Sigurd Ømann	262,756	9.1 (5th)	17 / 179	▲6	External support
1973	Sigurd Ømann	183,522	6.0 (7th)	11 / 179	▼6	Opposition
1975	Gert Petersen	150,963	5.0 (7th)	9 / 179	▼2	External support
1977	Gert Petersen	120,357	3.9 (6th)	7 / 179	▼2	Opposition
1979	Gert Petersen	187,284	5.9 (5th)	11 / 179	▲4	External support
1981	Gert Petersen	353,373	11.3 (3rd)	21 / 179	▲10	Opposition
1984	Gert Petersen	387,122	11.5 (4th)	21 / 179	0	Opposition
1987	Gert Petersen	490,176	14.6 (3rd)	27 / 179	▲6	Opposition
1988	Gert Petersen	433,261	13.0 (3rd)	24 / 179	▼3	Opposition
1990	Gert Petersen	268,759	8.3 (4th)	15 / 179	▼9	Opposition (1990–1993)
1990	Gert Petersen	268,759	8.3 (4th)	15 / 179	▼9	External support (1993–1994)
1994	Holger K. Nielsen	242,398	7.3 (4th)	13 / 179	▼2	External support
1998	Holger K. Nielsen	257,406	7.6 (4th)	13 / 179	0	External support
2001	Holger K. Nielsen	219,842	6.4 (5th)	12 / 179	▼1	Opposition
2005	Holger K. Nielsen	201,047	6.0 (6th)	11 / 179	▼1	Opposition
2007	Villy Søvndal	450,975	13.0 (4th)	23 / 179	▲12	Opposition
2011	Villy Søvndal	326,082	9.2 (5th)	16 / 179	▼7	Coalition (2011–2014)
2011	Villy Søvndal	326,082	9.2 (5th)	16 / 179	▼7	External support (2014–2015)
2015	Pia Olsen Dyhr	148,027	4.2 (8th)	7 / 179	▼9	Opposition
2019	Pia Olsen Dyhr	272,093	7.7 (5th)	14 / 179	▲7	External support
2022	Pia Olsen Dyhr	293,186	8.3 (4th)	15 / 179	▲1	Opposition
2026	Pia Olsen Dyhr	413,306	11.6 (2nd)	20 / 179	▲5	Coalition

=== Local elections ===
Municipal elections

Year	Seats	
Year	No.	±
1962	45 / 11,414	New
1966	74 / 10,005	▲29
Municipal reform
1970	27 / 4,677	▼47
1974	78 / 4,735	▲51
1978	80 / 4,759	▲2
1981	155 / 4,769	▲75
1985	320 / 4,773	▲165
1989	301 / 4,737	▼19
1993	228 / 4,703	▼73
1997	233 / 4,685	▲5
2001	237 / 4,647	▲4
Municipal reform
2005	162 / 2,522	▼75
2009	340 / 2,468	▲178
2013	116 / 2,444	▼224
2017	126 / 2,432	▲10
2021	168 / 2,436	▲42

Regional elections

Year	Seats	
Year	No.	±
1962	1 / 301	New
1966	1 / 303	0
Municipal reform
1970	1 / 366	0
1974	9 / 370	▲8
1978	12 / 370	▲3
1981	24 / 370	▲12
1985	40 / 374	▲16
1989	35 / 374	▼5
1993	30 / 374	▼5
1997	25 / 374	▼5
2001	23 / 374	▼2
Municipal reform
2005	12 / 205	▼11
2009	32 / 205	▲20
2013	10 / 205	▼22
2017	15 / 205	▲5
2021	14 / 205	▼1

Mayors

Year	Seats	
Year	No.	±
2005	1 / 98	
2009	2 / 98	▲1
2013	1 / 98	▼1
2017	1 / 98	0
2021	2 / 98	▲1

=== European Parliament ===
Year	List leader	Votes	%	Seats	+/–	EP Group
1979	Bodil Boserup	81,991	4.70 (7th)	1 / 15	New	COM
1984	Bodil Boserup	183,580	9.22 (5th)	1 / 15	0	COM
1989	John Iversen	162,902	9.10 (5th)	1 / 16	0	COM
1994	Lilli Gyldenkilde	178,543	8.58 (6th)	1 / 16	0	NGLA
1999	Pernille Frahm	140,053	7.11 (7th)	1 / 16	0	GUE/NGL
2004	Margrete Auken	150,766	7.96 (5th)	1 / 14	0	G/EFA
2009	Margrete Auken	371,603	15.87 (3rd)	2 / 13	▲1	G/EFA
2014	Margrete Auken	249,305	10.95 (4th)	1 / 13	▼1	G/EFA
2019	Margrete Auken	364,895	13.23 (3rd)	2 / 14	▲1	G/EFA
2024	Kira Peter-Hansen	426,472	17.42 (1st)	3 / 15	▲1	G/EFA

== Representation ==
=== Members of the Folketing ===
The party has 15 members of the Danish parliament. In the 2022 election, the SF gained 1 seat and won 15 seats in total, the best result with Pia Olsen Dyhr as leader.

- Sigurd Agersnap
- Kirsten Normann Andersen
- Theresa Berg Andersen
- Lisbeth Bech-Nielsen
- Anne Valentina Berthelsen
- Marianne Bigum
- Astrid Carøe
- Karina Lorentzen Dehnhardt
- Pia Olsen Dyhr
- Karsten Hønge
- Sofie Lippert
- Jacob Mark
- Signe Munk
- Charlotte Broman Mølbæk
- Carl Valentin

=== Members of the European Parliament ===
The SF has always been represented in the European Parliament. It gained one seat in 1979, 1984 (one additional seat on 1 January 1985), 1989, and 2004. Since 2004, the elected candidate was Margrete Auken. Without the approval of the party's board, she joined The Greens–European Free Alliance parliamentary group, instead of the European United Left/Nordic Green Left in 2004. Since then, the party has come around to her point of view, and at the national congress in 2008, it was decided that future SF MEPs would stay in the Greens–European Free Alliance group in the European Parliament but that SF would only join the European Green Party as an observer and not as a member. In the 2009 European elections, the party increased its share of votes to 15,6%, and got an additional seat which went to Emilie Turunen, who became a member of the Social Democrats in March 2013. For the 2019 European elections, the SF won back the 2nd seat and is now also represented by Kira Marie Peter-Hansen, who is the youngest parliamentarian ever elected for the European Parliament. SF's members of the European Parliament since the 2024 European elections are as follows:

- Kira Marie Peter-Hansen
- Rasmus Nordqvist
- Villy Søvndal

=== Municipal and regional government ===
The party has approximately 236 elected representatives in local town councils and 21 representatives in Denmark's fourteen regional councils. During the 1990s, the party gained its first mayors.

=== Former Members of the Folketing ===
- Anne Baastrup (2005–2011)
- Anne Grete Holmsgaard (2005–2011)
- Astrid Krag (2007–2011; defected)
- Eigil Andersen (2007–2011)
- Flemming Bonne (2007–2011)
- Hanne Agersnap (2007–2011)
- Holger K. Nielsen (2005–2011, 2015–2019)
- Ida Auken (2007–2011; defected)
- Jacob Mark (2015–2019)
- Jesper Petersen (2007–2011; defected)
- Jonas Dahl (2007–2011)
- Kamal Qureshi (2005–2011)
- Karina Lorentzen (2007–2011)
- Karl Bornhøft (2007–2011)
- Karsten Hønge (2007–2011, 2015–2019)
- Kirsten Normann Andersen (2015–2019; took former MP Jonas Dahl's seat as he left the Folketing)
- Kristen Touborg Jensen (2005–2011)
- Lisbeth Bech Poulsen (2015–2019)
- Morten Homann (2005–2007)
- Nanna Westerby (2007–2011)
- Ole Sohn (2005–2011; defected)
- Özlem Cekic (2007–2011)
- Pernille Frahm (2007–2011)
- Pernille Vigsø Bagge (2005–2011)
- Pia Olsen Dyhr (2007–2011, 2015–2019)
- Poul Henrik Hedeboe (2005–2007)
- Steen Gade (2005–2011)
- Trine Torp (2015–2019)
- Villy Søvndal (2005–2011)

== See also ==
- Green party
- Green politics
- List of environmental organizations
- List of political parties in Denmark
