= Communist Party of Denmark =

Political party in Denmark

Communist Party of Denmark Danmarks Kommunistiske Parti
- Leader: Rikke Carlsson
- Founded: 9 November 1919; 106 years ago
- Headquarters: Frederikssundsvej 64, 2400 Copenhagen NV
- Newspaper: Arbejderbladet ("The Worker's Paper"), 1922–1941; Land og Folk ("Land and People"), 1941–1990; Skub ("Push"), 2001–2023; Kommunist ("Communist") 2023–present
- Youth wing: Communist Youth of Denmark (1919–1990); Young Communist League of Denmark (1999) (since 1999); Young Communist League (2009-2023)
- Membership: 200 (2025)
- Ideology: Communism; Marxism–Leninism
- Political position: Far-left
- National affiliation: Red–Green Alliance (1989–2023)
- International affiliation: IMCWP; Comintern (1920–1943)
- Colours: Red

Website
- dkp.dk

The Communist Party of Denmark (Danish: Danmarks Kommunistiske Parti, DKP) is the main Marxist-Leninist party in Denmark. It was founded on 9 November 1919 as the Left-Socialist Party of Denmark (Danmarks Venstresocialistiske Parti, VSP), through a merger of the Socialist Youth League and Socialist Labour Party of Denmark, both of which had broken away from the Social Democrats in March 1918. The party adopted its present name in November 1920, when it joined the Comintern.

The DKP was last represented in the Danish parliament (Folketing) in 1979. In 1989, on the initiative of the Left Socialists (VS), the DKP and the Socialist Workers Party (SAP) jointly launched a new socialist political party named the Red-Green Alliance (Enhedslisten).

== History ==
=== Background and establishment ===
Marie-Sophie Nielsen led the faction of Social Democrats that broke away in 1918 and founded the Socialist Labour Party of Denmark due to an accumulation of conflicts with the reformist leadership of the Social Democrats. In particular, they opposed cooperation with the Radical Liberal Party, with whom the Social Democrats allied themselves in general elections. The Socialist Labour Party of Denmark began laying the foundations for a new party in March 1918, soon after its establishment.

In 1919, the party cooperated with the syndicalist movement, primarily organized within the Trade Union Opposition Coalition (Fagoppositionens Sammenslutning, FS) and the Socialist Youth League, a left-wing group that broke away from the Social Democratic Youth (the youth wing of the Social Democrats), to establish the Left-Socialist Party of Denmark on 9 November 1919.

The party participated in the 2nd Comintern Congress in 1920. The party approved the admission requirements, changed its name to the Communist Party of Denmark, and joined the Comintern the same year. This, however, led to a split within the party, with the FS-led syndicalist faction withdrawing from the party.

Following a rapprochement between the two groups, and with the support of the Soviet Union, the DKP and FS formed a joint federation in 1921, known as the Communist Federation (Kommunistisk Føderation). However, the cooperation was short lived; the federation split in 1922 following an attempted coup of the party's leadership, and for the next 18 months Denmark would have two parties calling themselves the Communist Party of Denmark, although only one was recognized by the Comintern. The two parties were successfully merged once more in 1923, but inter-factional conflicts would continue for another 20 years.

DKP election poster

For the initial period following the party's reunification, the DKP's leadership consisted of the social democrats who had formerly belonged to the Socialist Labour Party of Denmark and the Socialist Youth League. During this period, the party made little electoral or popular headway, declining from 0.5% of the vote in 1924, to 0.4% in 1926, and 0.3% in 1929.

The Comintern intervened by means of an open letter to the party in 1929, forcing the removal of the DKP's leadership. For the next 18 months, the party was placed under the direct administration of the Communist Party of the Soviet Union (CPSU). The new leadership that was appointed consisted of pro-Soviet hardliners, with Aksel Larsen becoming the new Chairman of the Central Committee.

This intervention resulted in the DKP making an "ultra-left turn". This was characterized strategically by a designation of the Social Democrats as the primary enemy of communism and the adoption of anti-social democratic rhetoric, such as the labelling of the Social Democrats as "social fascists". Concurrently, the Great Depression was reaching its peak in Denmark, allowing the DKP to channel rising economic dissatisfaction. Particularly, the party grew in popularity amongst the unemployed. The party also gained popularity amongst students and intellectuals for its anti-fascist activities.

In the 1932 elections, the DKP achieved parliamentary representation for the first time, obtaining 1.1% of the vote and 2 seats. This increased to 1.9% of the vote in 1935, and 2.4% in 1939. The 1930s were a period of constant advancement for the party.

=== Ban by German occupation authorities ===
Land og Folk from 1945

Germany invaded Denmark on 9 April 1940. For the first 14 months of the German occupation, the DKP was allowed to continue operating legally, but more than 300 communists, including members of parliament, were interned by the Danish police on 22 June 1941, following the German invasion of the Soviet Union. The party was subsequently outlawed when the Communist Law came into force two months later on 22 August 1941. A national unity government was formed by the other major parties, which cooperated with the Germans, including in the outlawing of the DKP.

==== Resistance against German occupation ====
The DKP continued to operate underground, and was a major force in the Danish resistance movement. Members of the DKP sat on the Danish Freedom Council, the largest underground resistance force against the German occupation. Following the collapse of the national unity government on 29 August 1943, the DKP, along with other non-socialist resistance forces, became the informal government of the country.

The Social Democrats experienced a rapid decline in influence during this period, remaining outside of the resistance movement for the entirety of the occupation. The party was weakened to the point that several failed attempts were made to merge it into the DKP.

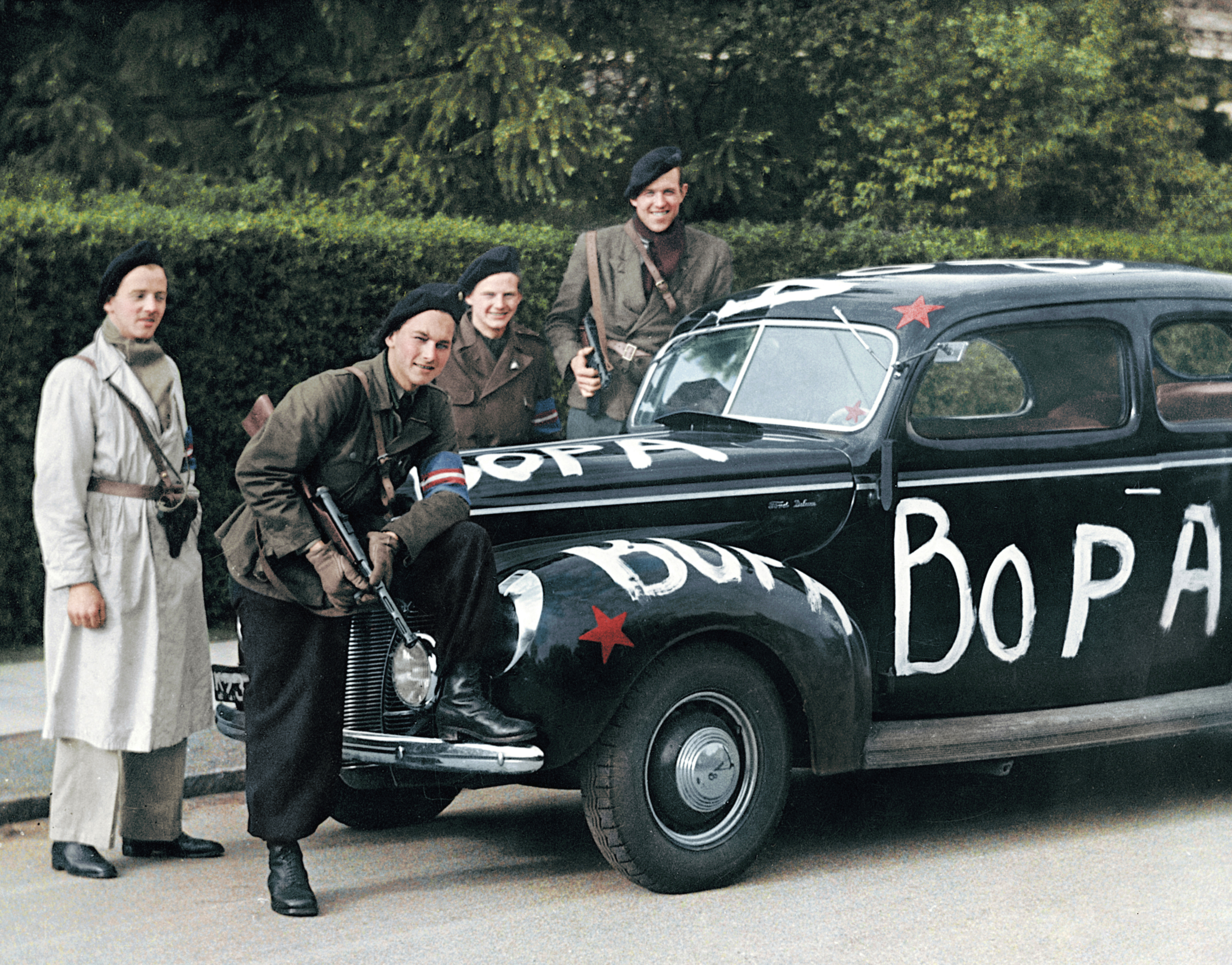
Armed BOPA members (Danish: Borgerlige Partisaner, Civil Partisans) was a group of the Danish resistance movement; it was affiliated with the Communist Party of Denmark and developed after the occupation of Denmark.

=== Post-war legalization ===
1945 DKP election programme, "Will of the People – Law of the Country"

After the liberation of Denmark on 5 May 1945, the first communist minister was inducted into the new liberation government when Alfred Jensen was made Minister of Traffic. Aksel Larsen was also made a minister without portfolio. The government was roughly evenly split between members of the old national unity government and members of the Danish Freedom Council and other resistance groups.

In the first post-liberation parliamentary election, the DKP obtained a much-improved 12.5% of the vote (255,236 votes) and 18 seats, although it was not included in the new post-election Venstre-led government. The party was the primary force against Denmark's participation in NATO in the late 1940s. While the party was unsuccessful in that effort, the movement successfully forced the Danish government to refuse permission to place NATO air fields in Denmark.

=== Cold War era ===
Officially, the DKP's political line did not conflict with that of the CPSU, but pre-war factional tensions continued in the party in the post-war period. Factional tensions peaked with the Soviet suppression of the Hungarian revolution of 1956, which caused a massive backlash against the DKP, and sparked a split within the party.

DKP chairman Aksel Larsen had been the leader of the revisionist camp in the party from 1956 onwards, but suffered a rout at the 20th Congress of the DKP in 1958. Larsen was expelled for his statements against Soviet involvement in the Hungarian revolution, and he formed a new party, the Socialist People's Party (SF), which advocated socialism independent of the Soviet Union. Larsen was replaced by Knud Jespersen, a hardline pro-Soviet communist, positioning the DKP as a staunch supporter of the Soviet Union.

By 1960, the DKP's membership had fallen significantly to 5,000. The first post-split parliamentary election was held that same year, and the DKP lost parliamentary representation for the first time since the liberation of Denmark, falling to 1.1% of the vote. The Socialist People's Party achieved 6.1% of the vote and won 11 seats.

The party achieved a resurgence following the 24th Congress of the DKP in 1973, which focused on demanding Denmark's withdrawal from NATO and the EC. On the back of rising disaffection with the EC and increased popularity amongst student movements, the DKP regained parliamentary representation in 1973 election, taking 3.6% of the vote and 6 seats.

The DKP fell out of parliament once again in the 1979 parliamentary election, and suffered several high-profile defections in the waning years of the Soviet Union, including that of party chairman Ole Sohn, who was expelled in 1991 and later joined the Socialist People's Party.

=== After the dissolution of the Eastern Bloc ===
In 1989, the DKP joined with two other left-wing parties, the Left Socialists and the Trotskyist Socialist Workers Party, to form the Unity List – The Red-Green Alliance (Enhedslisten – De Rød-Grønne). Gert Petersen, then-chairman of the Socialist People's Party, claimed at the time that cooperation between such diffuse ideological currents would fail. Not all members of the DKP supported the launching of the Unity List either, and some chose to split with the party in 1990 to create a new communist party, the Communist Party in Denmark (KPiD). The Unity List has been a cause of political strife for Danish communists ever since. There are several issues, the two main ones being dual membership and communist unity.

The DKP reorganized heavily in 1992, severing the party's links with the international communist movement and officially changing its purpose from a political organ to a network-oriented organization. At the same time, the Unity List changed from a political coalition to a regular independent membership-based political party. The Unity List achieved parliamentary representation in the 1994 parliamentary election, winning 6 seats, 2 of which were held by members who were also DKP members. The Unity List has been represented continually in parliament since then.

The DKP revived its former contact with the international communist movement by joining the annual International Meeting of Communist and Workers Parties in 2002. Since 2009, the DKP has been represented in local municipal and regional elections, often in cooperation with the KPiD and KP, two other Danish Communist parties.

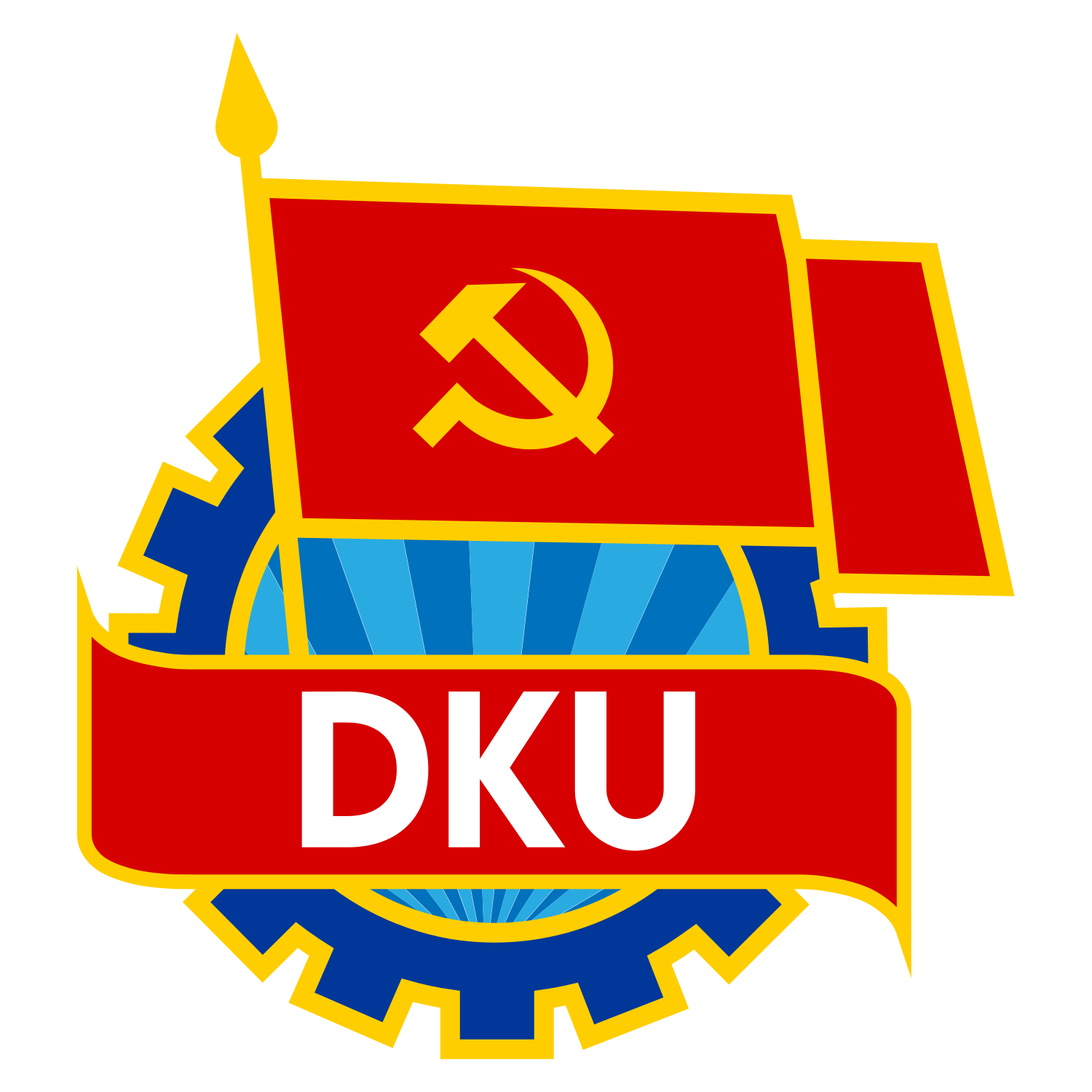
Denmark's Communist Youth, (Danish: Danmarks Kommunistiske Ungdom) DKU (2009).

In September 2023 the KPiD merged with the DKP, after a more than 20-year process of unification talks.

== Organization ==
=== Press ===
The DKP issued the newspaper Land og Folk (Land and People) from 1919 to 1982.

In the early 1920s, the party's newspaper was named Arbejderbladet ("The Worker's Paper") and had a circulation of approximately 6,000, but this dropped to around 4,000 by the late 1920s. Circulation began to climb again starting in the 1930s, rising to 7,000 in 1935 and 12,000 by 1940. Beginning in 1933, the party published a theoretical periodical called Kommunistisk Tidsskrift ("Communist Periodical"), which was renamed Tiden (Time) from 1936 onwards.

During the German occupation of Denmark, the party began publishing a clandestine newspaper called Politiske Maanedsbreve ("Political Monthly Letters"), which was soon renamed Land og Folk ("Land and People"). It was one of the most widely circulated underground papers in the country, and continued as the main press organ of the DKP until 1982. In addition, the DKP published a large number of local papers.

Since 2001, the DKP has published the quarterly magazine Skub ("Push") with news related to the party and communism in general. After the merger with the KPiD the new magazine of the DKP is called Kommunist.

== Chairpersons ==
Name	Period
Ernst Christiansen	1919–1926
Sigvald Hellberg	1926–1927
Thøger Thøgersen	1927–1931
Aksel Larsen	1932–1958
Ib Nørlund (Note: When the party was outlawed during the German occupation of Denmark, Aksel Larsen was arrested. Party secretariat Ib Nørlund temporarily became leader during this period.)	1941–1945
Knud Jespersen	1958–1977
Jørgen Jensen	1977–1987
Ole Sohn	1987–1991
Collective Leadership	1991–2003
Henrik Stamer Hedin	2003–2023
Henrik Stamer Hedin and Rikke Carlsson	2023–2024
Rikke Carlsson	2024–present

== Notable members ==
- Martin Andersen-Nexø
- Ruth Berlau
- Herluf Bidstrup
- Jens-Peter Bonde
- Inger Merete Nordentoft
- Hans Scherfig

== Election results ==
Folketing
Election year	# of overall votes	% of overall vote	# of overall seats won	±
1920 (April)	3,859	0.4 (Note: As the Left-Socialist Party of Denmark)	0 / 139	
1920 (July)	did not contest			
1920 (September)	5,160	0.4	0 / 148	Steady
1924	6,219	0.5	0 / 148	Steady
1926	5,678	0.4	0 / 148	Steady
1929	3,656	0.2	0 / 148	Steady
1932	17,179	1.1	2 / 148	▲2
1935	27,135	1.9	2 / 148	Steady
1939	40,893	2.4	3 / 148	▲1
1943	Banned			
1945	255,236	12.5	18 / 148	▲15
1947	141,094	6.8	9 / 148	▼9
1950	94,523	4.6	7 / 149	▼2
1953 (April)	98,940	4.8	7 / 149	Steady
1953 (September)	93,824	4.3	8 / 175	▲1
1957	72,315	3.1	6 / 175	▼2
1960	27,298	1.1	0 / 175	▼6
1964	32,390	1.2	0 / 175	Steady
1966	21,553	0.8	0 / 175	Steady
1968	29,706	1.0	0 / 175	Steady
1971	39,564	1.4	0 / 175	Steady
1973	110,715	3.6	6 / 175	▲6
1975	127,837	4.2	7 / 175	▲1
1977	114,022	3.7	7 / 175	Steady
1979	58,901	1.9	0 / 175	▼7
1981	34,625	1.1	0 / 175	Steady
1984	23,085	0.7	0 / 175	Steady
1987	28,974	0.9	0 / 175	Steady
1988	27,439	0.8	0 / 175	Steady
1990 onwards	Participates through Unity List			

== Literature ==
- Ib Nørlund: "Det knager i samfundets fuger og bånd", Rids af dansk arbejderbevægelses udvikling, 1959, 3rd edition 1972 (in Danish)
- Knud Holt Nielsen: "Giv mig de rene og ranke... Danmarks Kommunistiske Ungdom 1960–1990", udgivet af SFAH 2009 (in Danish)
