= Land og Folk =

Communist newspaper in Denmark (1919–1982)

- Land og Folk from April 1945
- Type: Daily newspaper
- Format: Broadsheet
- Founded: 1919
- Ceased publication: 28 December 1990
- Political alignment: Communist
- Language: Danish
- Headquarters: Copenhagen
- Country: Denmark
- OCLC number: 70257033

Land og Folk (Danish: [ˈlænˀ ʌ ˈfʌlˀk]; Danish: Land and People) was a communist newspaper published from 1919 to 1990. It became the main organ of the Communist Party of Denmark (DKP) from 1920 and boomed in circulation during World War II, growing from 12,000 copies in 1940 to 120,000 copies in 1945. The paper was printed in Copenhagen, but distributed countrywide. It ran the Land og Folk Festival, which gathered around 100,000 visitors annually.

== History and profile ==
The newspaper was established as a weekly in 1919 under the name of Arbejdet (Danish: The Labour). In 1920, it became the central organ of the DKP. The following year it was renamed as Arbejderbladet (Danish: The Worker's Paper) after the formation of the Communist Federation. The paper was published on a daily basis from 1964.

Its title was Arbejderbladet until June 1941 which was changed to Land og Folk on 1 March 1942, after a brief existence with the title Politiske Maanedsbreve (Danish: Political Monthly Letters). During the German occupation of Denmark in World War II, on 22 June 1941, and a few months before Denmark joined a revised anti-comintern pact in November that same year, Danish police arrested and detained hundreds of communists. On 22 August 1941 the paper was banned. However, it was published illegally by the Danish resistance movement until 1945.

In 1950, an automatic Mercedes printing machine and in 1969, a printing press were given to Land og Folk by the East German ruling communist party, SED. The paper had some conflicts with the DKP in the mid-1960s. The paper claimed in the early 1950s that the American Federal Bureau of Investigation was like the Gestapo describing the Truman administration as a Fascist government.

In the 1960s the subscribers of Land og Folk included large number of Russians, and the paper was sent to Moscow each day. However, a rift occurred between the paper and the DKP central committee in 1968 when the Soviet Union invaded Czechoslovakia.

Frede Jakobsen served as the editor-in-chief of Land og Folk which was based in Copenhagen. David Hejgaard was the industrial editor of the paper in the mid-1940s.

Land og Folk ceased publication in 1982. It was later restarted, but permanently folded on 28 December 1990.

The photo archive of Land og Folk is kept in Arbejdermuseet in Copenhagen.

=== Circulation ===
In the 1920s its circulation ranged between 4,000 and 6,000 copies. During the next decade its circulation was significantly increased and became nearly 12,000 copies in 1940. By the end of the Nazi occupation in 1945 the paper had a daily circulation of 120,000 copies.

The circulation of Land og Folk was 19,181 in 1952. During the last six months of 1957 the paper sold 10,833 copies on weekdays. Land og Folk had a circulation of 7,100 copies in 1975.
