= Poul Nyrup Rasmussen I Cabinet =

Danish government from 1993 to 1994

Poul Nyrup Rasmussen I
- 66th Cabinet of Denmark

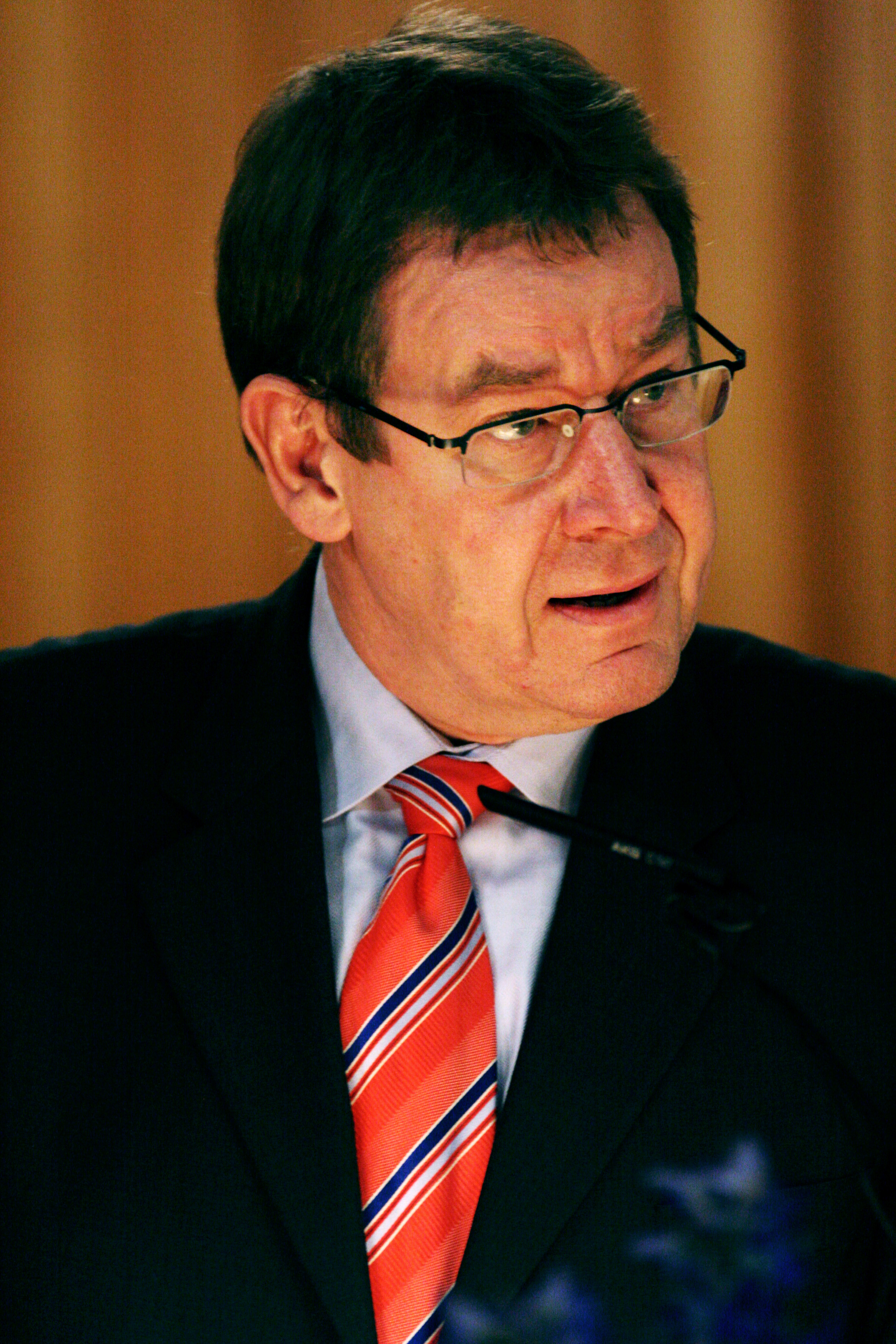
- Date formed: 25 January 1993
- Date dissolved: 27 September 1994

People and organisations
- Monarch: Margrethe II of Denmark
- Prime Minister: Poul Nyrup Rasmussen
- Prime Minister's history: P. N. Rasmussen II–III–IV
- Member parties: Social Democrats; Centre Democrats; Social Liberals; Christian Democrats; Supported by: Green Left
- Status in legislature: Minority coalition government
- Opposition parties: Conservatives; Venstre; Progress

History
- Election: —
- Legislature term: 1990–1994
- Predecessor: Schlüter IV
- Successor: P. N. Rasmussen II

When the conservative Prime Minister Poul Schlüter resigned on the 15 January 1993 because of the Tamil Case, the leader of the Social Democrats Poul Nyrup Rasmussen formed his first cabinet on the 25 January 1993. The cabinet consisted of the Social Democrats, the Social Liberal Party, the Centre Democrats and the Christian People's Party.

The First cabinet of Poul Nyrup Rasmussen was replaced by the Cabinet of Poul Nyrup Rasmussen II on 27 September 1994 after the Social Democrats won the 1994 Danish parliamentary election.

== List of ministers ==
| Portfolio | Minister | Took office | Left office | Party | Ref |
Prime Minister's Office
| Prime Minister | Poul Nyrup Rasmussen | 25 January 1993 | 27 September 1994 | Social Democrats | |
| Minister of Foreign Affairs | Niels Helveg Petersen | 25 January 1993 | 27 September 1994 | Social Liberals | |
| Minister of Finance | Mogens Lykketoft | 25 January 1993 | 27 September 1994 | Social Democrats | |
| Minister of Economic Affairs | Marianne Jelved | 25 January 1993 | 27 September 1994 | Social Liberals | |
| Minister of the Interior | Birte Weiss | 25 January 1993 | 27 September 1994 | Social Democrats | |
| Minister of Justice | Pia Gjellerup | 25 January 1993 | 29 March 1993 | Social Democrats | |
| Minister of Justice | Erling Olsen | 29 March 1993 | 27 September 1994 | Social Democrats | |
| Minister of Business Coordination | Mimi Jakobsen | 25 January 1993 | 8 February 1994 | Centre Democrats | |
| Minister of Industry | Mimi Jakobsen | 28 January 1994 | 8 February 1994 | Centre Democrats | |
| Minister of Industry- and Business Coordination | Mimi Jakobsen | 8 February 1994 | 27 September 1994 | Centre Democrats | |
| Minister of Defence | Hans Hækkerup | 25 January 1993 | 27 September 1994 | Social Democrats | |
| Minister of Labor | Jytte Andersen | 25 January 1993 | 27 September 1994 | Social Democrats | |
| Minister of Education | Ole Vig Jensen | 25 January 1993 | 27 September 1994 | Social Liberals | |
| Minister of Health | Torben Lund | 25 January 1993 | 27 September 1994 | Social Democrats | |
| Minister of Culture | Jytte Hilden | 25 January 1993 | 27 September 1994 | Social Democrats | |
| Minister of Ecclesiastical Affairs | Arne Oluf Andersen | 25 January 1993 | 27 September 1994 | Centre Democrats | |
| Minister of Science and Technology | Svend Bergstein | 25 January 1993 | 27 September 1994 | Centre Democrats | |
| Minister of Science | Arne Oluf Andersen | 25 January 1993 | 27 September 1994 | Centre Democrats | |
| Minister of Social Affairs | Karen Jespersen | 25 January 1993 | 28 January 1994 | Social Democrats | |
| Minister of Social Affairs | Bente Juncker | 28 January 1994 | 11 February 1994 | Centre Democrats | |
| Minister of Social Affairs | Yvonne Herløv Andersen | 11 February 1994 | 27 September 1994 | Centre Democrats | |
| Minister of Traffic | Helge Mortensen | 25 January 1993 | 28 January 1994 | Social Democrats | |
| Minister of Traffic | Jan Trøjborg | 28 January 1994 | 27 September 1994 | Social Democrats | |
| Minister of Taxation | Ole Stavad | 25 January 1993 | 27 September 1994 | Social Democrats | |
| Minister of Energy | Jann Sjursen | 25 January 1993 | 27 September 1994 | Christian Democrats | |
| Minister of Development Cooperation | Helle Degn | 25 January 1993 | 27 September 1994 | Social Democrats | |
| Minister of Agriculture and Fisheries | Bjørn Westh | 25 January 1993 | 27 September 1994 | Social Democrats | |
| Minister of the Environment | Svend Auken | 25 January 1993 | 27 September 1994 | Social Democrats | |
| Minister of Communications and Tourism | Arne Melchior | 25 January 1993 | 28 January 1994 | Centre Democrats | |
| Minister of Communications and Tourism | Helge Mortensen | 28 January 1994 | 27 September 1994 | Social Democrats | |
| Minister of Housing & Minister of Nordic Cooperation and for the Baltic issue | Flemming Kofod-Svendsen | 25 January 1993 | 27 September 1994 | Christian Democrats | |

| Preceded by Schlüter IV | Cabinet of Denmark; 1993 – 1994 | Succeeded by Poul Nyrup Rasmussen II |
