= Minister of Science (Denmark) =

- Forskningsminister
- State coat of arms of the Kingdom of Denmark

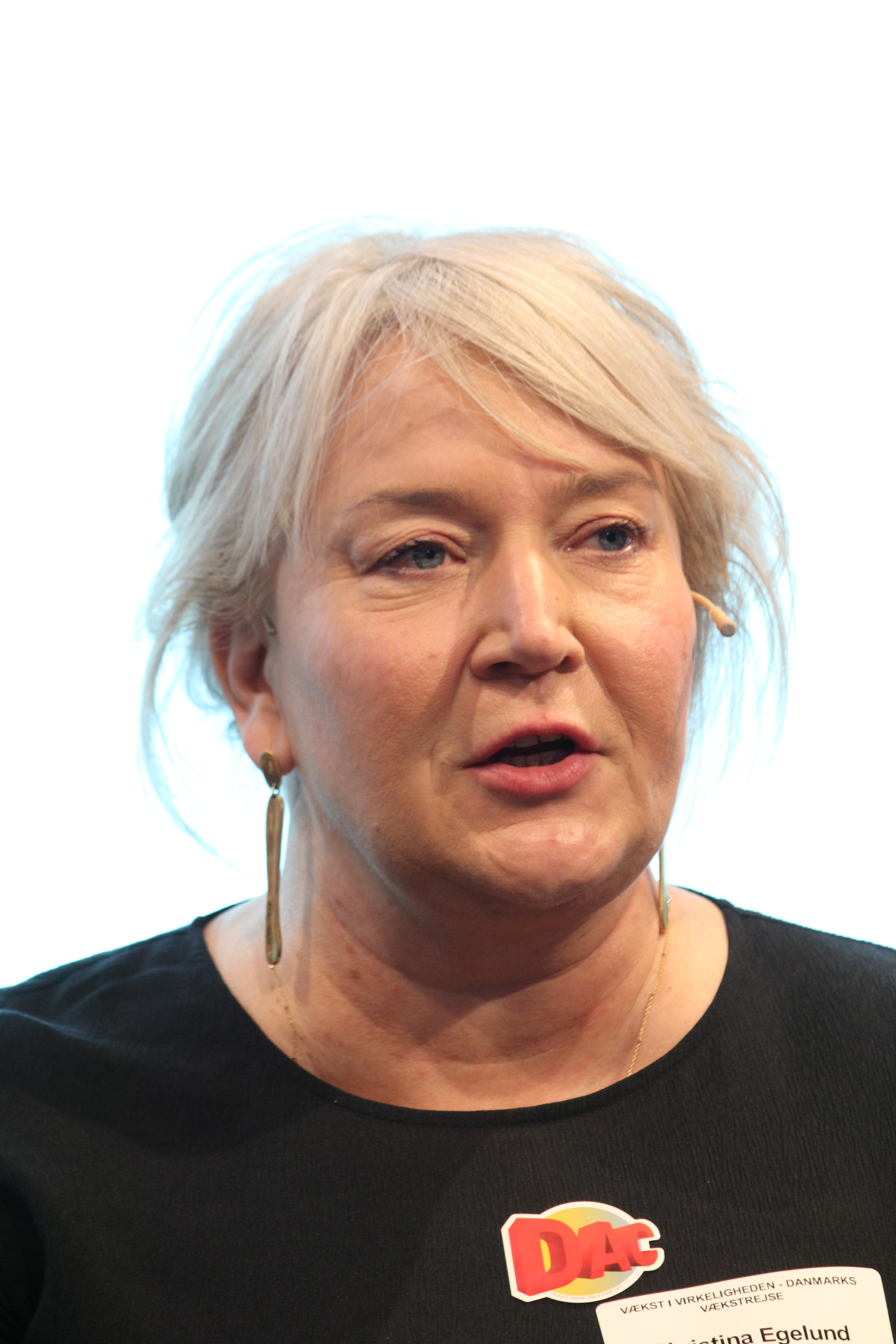
- Incumbent; Christina Egelund since 15 December 2022
- Ministry of Higher Education and Science
- Type: Minister
- Member of: Cabinet; State Council
- Reports to: the Prime minister
- Seat: Slotsholmen
- Appointer: The Monarch (on the advice of the Prime Minister)
- Formation: 10 September 1987; 38 years ago
- First holder: Bertel Haarder
- Succession: depending on the order in the State Council
- Deputy: Permanent Secretary
- Salary: 1.624.503,02 DKK (€217,931), in 2026

The Danish Minister of Science (Danish: Forskningsminister, lit. 'Minister of Research'), is a minister in the government of Denmark, with overall responsibility for strategy and policy related to higher education and science, often combined with other areas.

== List of ministers ==
No.	Portrait	Name (born-died)	Term of office			Political Party	Government	Ref.
No.	Portrait	Name (born-died)	Took office	Left office	Time in office	Political Party	Government	Ref.
Minister of Education and Science (Undervisnings- og forskningsminister)
1		Bertel Haarder (born 1944)	10 September 1987	25 January 1993	5 years, 137 days	Venstre	Schlüter II–III–IV	
Minister of Science and Technology (Forsknings- og teknologiminister)
2		Svend Bergstein (1941–2014)	25 January 1993	28 January 1994	1 year, 3 days	Centre Democrats	P. N. Rasmussen I	
Minister of Science (Forskningsminister)
3		Arne Oluf Andersen (born 1939)	28 January 1994	27 September 1994	242 days	Centre Democrats	P. N. Rasmussen I	
4		Frank Jensen (born 1961)	27 September 1994	30 December 1996	2 years, 94 days	Social Democrats	P. N. Rasmussen II	
5		Jytte Hilden (born 1942)	30 December 1996	23 March 1998	1 year, 83 days	Social Democrats	P. N. Rasmussen III	
6		Jan Trøjborg (1955–2012)	23 March 1998	10 July 1999	1 year, 109 days	Social Democrats	P. N. Rasmussen IV	
7		Birte Weiss (1941–2026)	10 July 1999	21 December 2000	1 year, 164 days	Social Democrats	P. N. Rasmussen IV	
Minister of IT and Science (IT- og forskningsminister)
7		Birte Weiss (born 1941)	21 December 2000	27 November 2001	341 days	Social Democrats	P. N. Rasmussen IV	
Minister of Science, Technology and Development (Minister for videnskab, teknologi og udvikling)
8		Helge Sander (born 1950)	27 November 2001	23 February 2010	8 years, 88 days	Venstre	A. F. Rasmussen I–II–III; L. L. Rasmussen I	
9		Charlotte Sahl-Madsen (born 1964)	23 February 2010	3 October 2011	1 year, 222 days	Conservative People's Party	L. L. Rasmussen I	
Minister of Science, Innovation and Higher Education (Minister for forskning, innovation og videregående uddannelser)
10		Morten Østergaard (born 1976)	3 October 2011	3 February 2014	2 years, 123 days	Social Liberal Party	Thorning-Schmidt I	
Minister of Higher Education and Science (Uddannelses- og forskningsminister)
11		Sofie Carsten Nielsen (born 1975)	3 February 2014	28 June 2015	1 year, 145 days	Social Liberal Party	Thorning-Schmidt II	
12		Esben Lunde Larsen (born 1978)	28 June 2015	29 February 2016	246 days	Venstre	L. L. Rasmussen II	
13		Ulla Tørnæs (born 1962)	29 February 2016	28 November 2016	273 days	Venstre	L. L. Rasmussen II	
14		Søren Pind (born 1969)	28 November 2016	2 May 2018	1 year, 155 days	Venstre	L. L. Rasmussen III	
15		Tommy Ahlers (born 1975)	2 May 2018	27 June 2019	1 year, 56 days	Venstre	L. L. Rasmussen III	
16		Ane Halsboe-Jørgensen (born 1983)	27 June 2019	16 August 2021	2 years, 50 days	Social Democrats	Frederiksen I	
17		Jesper Petersen (born 1981)	16 August 2021	15 December 2022	1 year, 121 days	Social Democrats	Frederiksen I	
18		Christina Egelund (born 1977)	15 December 2022	3 June 2026	3 years, 170 days	Moderates	Frederiksen II	
Minister of Science, Higher Education, and Digitalization (Forsknings-, uddannelses- og digitaliseringsminister)
18		Christina Egelund (born 1977)	3 June 2026	Incumbent	97 days	Moderates	Frederiksen III	
