= Minister of Business Affairs (Denmark) =

Danish cabinet position

- Erhvervsminister
- State coat of arms of the Kingdom of Denmark

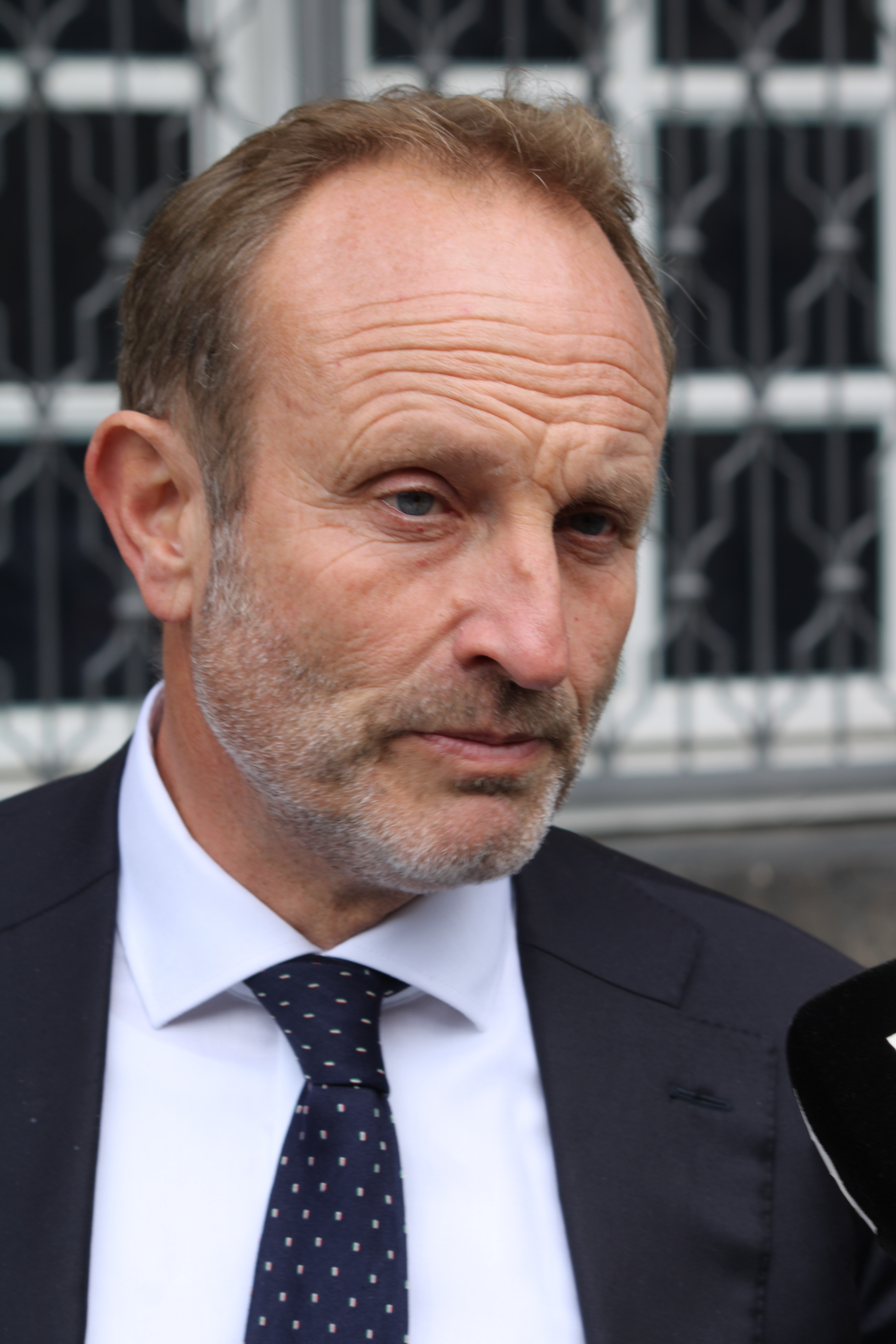
- Incumbent; Martin Lidegaard since 3 June 2026
- Ministry of Business Affairs
- Type: Minister
- Member of: Cabinet; State Council
- Reports to: the Prime minister
- Seat: Slotsholmen
- Appointer: The Monarch (on the advice of the Prime Minister)
- Precursor: Minister of Industry and Trade
- Formation: 27 September 1994; 31 years ago
- First holder: Mimi Jakobsen
- Succession: depending on the order in the State Council
- Deputy: Permanent Secretary
- Salary: 1.624.503,02 DKK (€217,931), in 2026
- Website: Official website

The Danish Minister of Business Affairs (Danish: Erhvervsminister), is a minister in the government of Denmark, with overall responsibility for strategy and policy across the Ministry of Business Affairs.

The position can be traced back to the minister of industry and trade.

== List of ministers ==
No.	Portrait	Name (born–died)	Term of office			Political party	Government	Ref.
No.	Portrait	Name (born–died)	Took office	Left office	Time in office	Political party	Government	Ref.
Minister of Business Affairs (Erhvervsminister)
1		Mimi Jakobsen (born 1948)	27 September 1994	30 December 1996	2 years, 94 days	Centre Democrats	P. N. Rasmussen II	
2		Jan Trøjborg (1955–2012)	28 January 1994	23 March 1998	4 years, 54 days	Social Democrats	P. N. Rasmussen III	
3		Pia Gjellerup (born 1959)	23 March 1998	21 December 2000	2 years, 273 days	Social Democrats	P. N. Rasmussen IV	
4		Ole Stavad (born 1949)	21 December 2000	27 November 2001	333 days	Social Democrats	P. N. Rasmussen IV	
Minister of Economic and Business Affairs (Økonomi- og Erhvervsminister)
5		Bendt Bendtsen (born 1954)	27 November 2001	10 September 2008	6 years, 288 days	Conservative People's Party	A. F. Rasmussen I–II–III	
6		Lene Espersen (born 1965)	10 September 2008	23 February 2010	1 year, 166 days	Conservative People's Party	A. F. Rasmussen III; L. L. Rasmussen I	
7		Brian Mikkelsen (born 1966)	23 February 2010	3 October 2011	1 year, 222 days	Conservative People's Party	L. L. Rasmussen I	
Minister of Business Affairs and Growth (Erhvervs- og Vækstminister)
8		Ole Sohn (born 1954)	3 October 2011	16 October 2012	1 year, 13 days	Green Left	Thorning-Schmidt I	
9		Annette Vilhelmsen (born 1959)	16 October 2012	9 August 2013	297 days	Green Left	Thorning-Schmidt I	
10		Henrik Sass Larsen (born 1966)	9 August 2013	28 June 2015	1 year, 323 days	Social Democrats	Thorning-Schmidt I–II	
11		Troels Lund Poulsen (born 1976)	28 June 2015	28 November 2016	1 year, 153 days	Venstre	L. L. Rasmussen II	
Minister of Business Affairs (Erhvervsminister)
(7)		Brian Mikkelsen (born 1966)	28 November 2016	20 June 2018	1 year, 204 days	Conservative People's Party	L. L. Rasmussen III	
12		Rasmus Jarlov (born 1977)	20 June 2018	27 June 2019	1 year, 7 days	Conservative People's Party	L. L. Rasmussen III	
13		Simon Kollerup (born 1986)	27 June 2019	15 December 2022	3 years, 171 days	Social Democrats	Frederiksen I	
14		Morten Bødskov (born 1970)	15 December 2022	3 June 2026	3 years, 170 days	Social Democrats	Frederiksen II	
Minister of Business Affairs and Competitiveness (Erhvervs- og konkurrencekraftsminister)
15		Martin Lidegaard (born 1966)	3 June 2026	Incumbent	96 days	Social Liberal	Frederiksen III	
