= Poul Nyrup Rasmussen IV Cabinet =

Danish government from 1998 to 2001

Poul Nyrup Rasmussen IV
- 69th Cabinet of Denmark

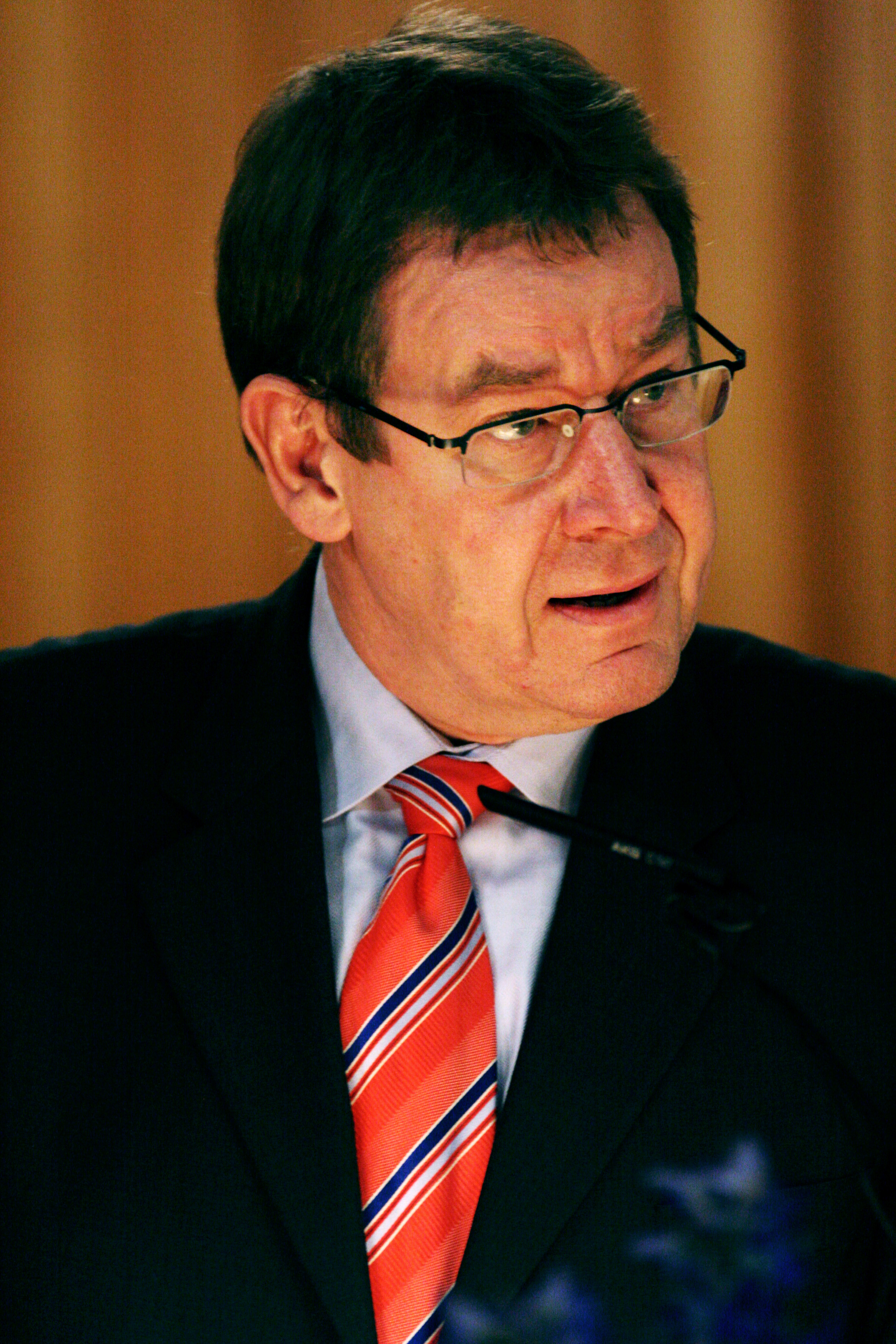
- Date formed: 23 March 1998
- Date dissolved: 27 November 2001

People and organisations
- Head of state: Margrethe II of Denmark
- Head of government: Poul Nyrup Rasmussen
- No. of ministers: 22
- Ministers removed: 14
- Total no. of members: 35
- Member parties: Social Democrats; Social Liberals; Supported by: Green Left; Red-Green Alliance
- Status in legislature: Minority coalition government
- Opposition parties: Venstre; Conservatives; Danish People's Party; Centre Democrats; Christian Democrats; Progress

History
- Election: 1998
- Outgoing election: 2001
- Predecessor: P. N. Rasmussen III
- Successor: A. F. Rasmussen I

After the 1998 Danish parliamentary election, the sitting Danish Prime Minister Poul Nyrup Rasmussen was able to reform the government coalition of his own Social Democrats and the Danish Social Liberal Party. The resulting cabinet, which replaced the Cabinet of Poul Nyrup Rasmussen III, was formed on 23 March 1998 and was called the Cabinet of Poul Nyrup Rasmussen IV.

The cabinet was replaced by the Cabinet of Anders Fogh Rasmussen I on 27 November 2001, after the Liberal Party's Anders Fogh Rasmussen had gained parliamentary support in the 2001 Danish parliamentary election.

== List of ministers and portfolios ==
Some periods in the table below start before 23 March 1998 because the minister was also in Cabinet of Poul Nyrup Rasmussen III.

Portfolio	Minister	Took office	Left office	Party
Prime Minister's Office
Prime Minister	Poul Nyrup Rasmussen	25 January 1993	27 November 2001	Social Democrats
Minister of Economic Affairs & Minister for Nordic Cooperation	Marianne Jelved	27 September 1994	27 November 2001	Social Liberals
Minister for Foreign Affairs	Niels Helveg Petersen	25 January 1993	21 December 2000	Social Liberals
Minister for Foreign Affairs	Mogens Lykketoft	21 December 2000	27 November 2001	Social Democrats
Minister for Finance	Mogens Lykketoft	25 January 1993	21 December 2000	Social Democrats
Minister for Finance	Pia Gjellerup	21 December 2000	27 November 2001	Social Democrats
Minister for the Environment and Energy	Svend Auken	27 September 1994	27 November 2001	Social Democrats
Minister for Science (Minister for Science and Technology from 21 December 2000)	Jan Trøjborg	23 March 1998	10 July 1999	Social Democrats
Minister for Science (Minister for Science and Technology from 21 December 2000)	Birte Weiss	10 July 1999	27 November 2001	Social Democrats
Minister of Education	Margrethe Vestager	23 March 1998	27 November 2001	Social Liberals
Minister for Ecclesiastical Affairs	Margrethe Vestager	23 March 1998	21 December 2000	Social Liberals
Minister for Ecclesiastical Affairs	Johannes Lebech	21 December 2000	27 November 2001	Social Liberals
Minister of Defence	Hans Haekkerup	25 January 1993	21 December 2000	Social Democrats
Minister of Defence	Jan Trøjborg	21 December 2000	27 November 2001	Social Democrats
Minister of the Interior	Thorkild Simonsen	20 October 1997	23 February 2000	Social Democrats
Minister of the Interior	Karen Jespersen	23 February 2000	27 November 2001	Social Democrats
Minister for Food	Henrik Dam Kristensen	30 December 1996	23 February 2000	Social Democrats
Minister for Food	Ritt Bjerregaard	23 February 2000	27 November 2001	Social Democrats
Minister for Justice	Frank Jensen	30 December 1996	27 November 2001	Social Democrats
Minister of Social Affairs	Karen Jespersen	27 September 1994	23 February 2000	Social Democrats
Minister of Social Affairs	Henrik Dam Kristensen	23 February 2000	27 November 2001	Social Democrats
Minister for Business Affairs	Pia Gjellerup	23 March 1998	21 December 2000	Social Democrats
Minister for Business Affairs	Ole Stavad	21 December 2000	27 November 2001	Social Democrats
Minister for Culture	Elsebeth Gerner Nielsen	23 March 1998	27 November 2001	Social Liberals
Minister of Labor	Ove Hygum	23 March 1998	27 November 2001	Social Democrats
Minister of Traffic	Sonja Mikkelsen	23 March 1998	23 February 2000	Social Democrats
Minister of Traffic	Jacob Buksti	23 February 2000	27 September 1999	Social Democrats
Minister for Housing	Jytte Andersen	23 March 1998	27 September 1999	Social Democrats
Minister for Gender Equality	Jytte Andersen	1 July 1999	27 September 1999	Social Democrats
Minister for Towns and Homes & Minister for Gender Equality	Jytte Andersen	27 September 1999	21 December 2000	Social Democrats
Minister for Towns and Homes & Minister for Gender Equality	Lotte Bundsgaard	21 December 2000	27 November 2001	Social Democrats
Minister for Taxation	Ole Stavad	23 March 1998	21 December 2000	Social Democrats
Minister for Taxation	Frode Sørensen	21 December 2000	27 November 2001	Social Democrats
Minister for Health	Carsten Koch	23 March 1998	23 February 2000	Social Democrats
Minister for Health	Sonja Mikkelsen	23 February 2000	21 December 2000	Social Democrats
Minister for Health	Arne Rolighed	21 December 2000	27 November 2001	Social Democrats
Minister for Development Cooperation	Poul Nielson	27 September 1994	10 July 1999	Social Democrats
Minister for Development Cooperation	Jan Trøjborg	10 July 1999	21 December 2000	Social Democrats
Minister for Development Cooperation	Anita Bay Bundegaard	21 December 2000	27 November 2001	Social Liberals

Preceded by Poul Nyrup Rasmussen III	Cabinet of Denmark; 1998 – 2001	Succeeded by Anders Fogh Rasmussen I
