= Poul Nyrup Rasmussen II Cabinet =

Danish government from 1994 to 1996

Poul Nyrup Rasmussen II
- 67th Cabinet of Denmark

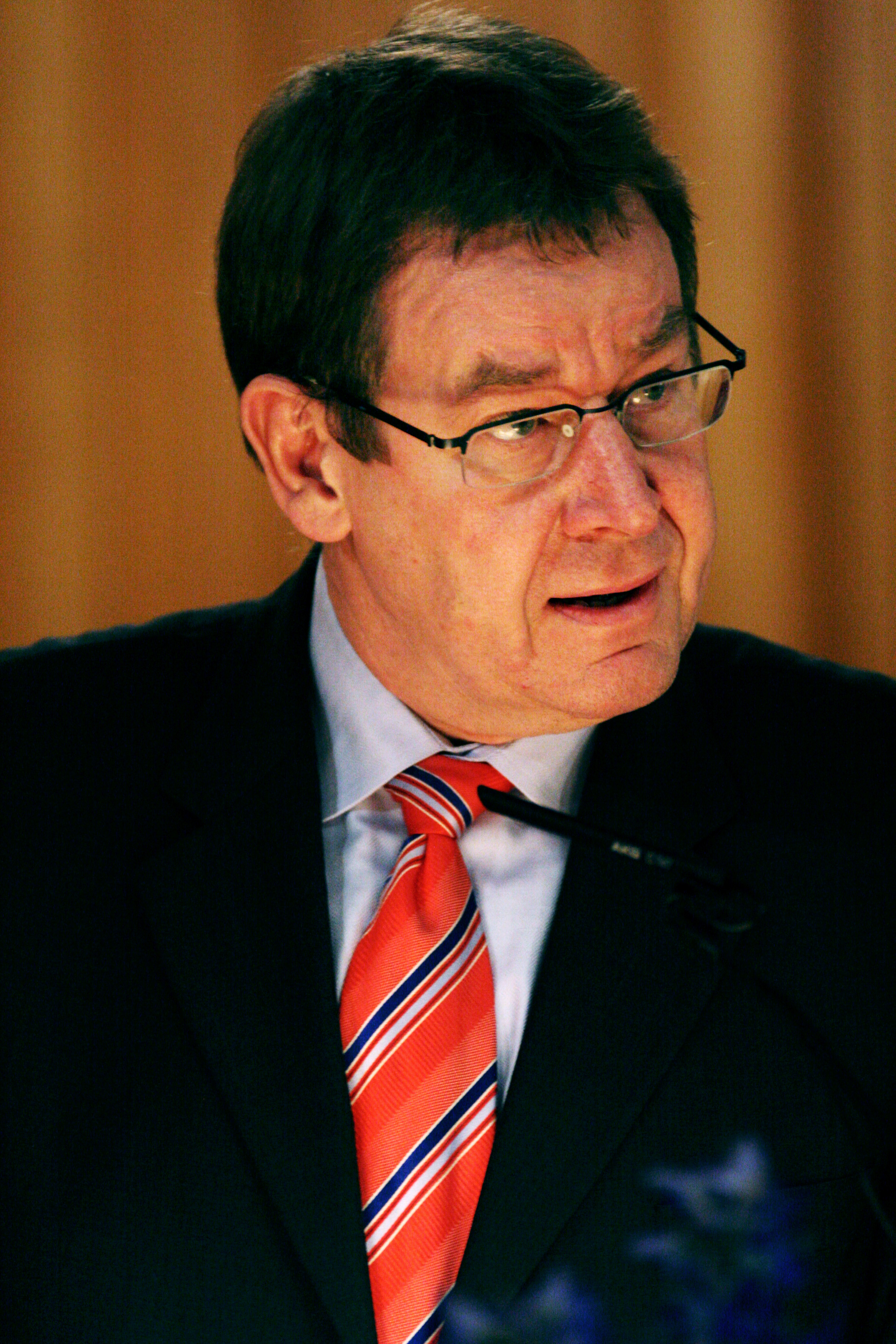
- Prime Minister Rasmussen
- Date formed: 27 September 1994
- Date dissolved: 30 December 1996

People and organisations
- Head of state: Margrethe II
- Head of government: Poul Nyrup Rasmussen
- No. of ministers: 20
- Ministers removed: 1
- Total no. of members: 21
- Member parties: Social Democrats; Social Liberals; Centre Democrats; Supported by: Green Left; Red-Green Alliance
- Status in legislature: Coalition
- Opposition parties: Venstre; Conservatives; Progress; Independent (1)

History
- Election: 1994
- Legislature term: 1994–1998
- Predecessor: P. N. Rasmussen I
- Successor: P. N. Rasmussen III

After the 1994 Danish parliamentary election, the sitting Danish Prime Minister Poul Nyrup Rasmussen was able to form a government coalition of his own Social Democrats, the Danish Social Liberal Party and the Centre Democrats. The resulting cabinet, which replaced the Cabinet of Poul Nyrup Rasmussen I, was formed on 27 September 1994 and was called the Cabinet of Poul Nyrup Rasmussen II.

The cabinet was replaced by the Cabinet of Poul Nyrup Rasmussen III on 30 December 1996, after the Centre Democrats left the government coalition in protest against the government negotiating the Budget of 1997 with the Green Left and the Red-Green Alliance.

== Cabinet changes ==
The cabinet was changed on 1 November 1994.

Some periods in the table below start before 27 September 1994 or end after 30 December 1996 because the minister was in the Cabinet of Poul Nyrup Rasmussen I or the Cabinet of Poul Nyrup Rasmussen III as well.

The cabinet consisted of:

Portfolio	Minister	Took office	Left office	Party
Prime Minister	Poul Nyrup Rasmussen	25 January 1993	27 November 2001	Social Democrats
Minister of Economic Affairs & Minister for Nordic Cooperation	Marianne Jelved	27 September 1994	27 November 2001	Social Liberals
Minister for Business Affairs	Mimi Jakobsen	27 September 1994	30 December 1996	Centre Democrats
Minister for Finance	Mogens Lykketoft	25 January 1993	21 December 2000	Social Democrats
Minister of Foreign Affairs	Niels Helveg Petersen	25 January 1993	21 December 2000	Social Liberals
Minister of Justice	Bjørn Westh	27 September 1994	30 December 1996	Social Democrats
Minister of Environment and Energy	Svend Auken	27 September 1994	27 November 2001	Social Democrats
Minister for Education	Ole Vig Jensen	25 January 1993	23 March 1998	Social Liberals
Minister for Development Cooperation	Poul Nielson	27 September 1994	10 July 1999	Social Democrats
Minister of the Interior & Minister for Ecclesiastical Affairs	Birte Weiss	25 January 1993	20 October 1997	Social Democrats
Minister for Labor	Jytte Andersen	25 January 1993	23 March 1998	Social Democrats
Minister for Taxation	Ole Stavad	25 January 1993	1 November 1994	Social Democrats
Minister for Taxation	Carsten Koch	1 November 1994	23 March 1998	Social Democrats
Minister of Defence	Hans Hækkerup	25 January 1993	21 December 2000	Social Democrats
Minister for Culture	Jytte Hilden	25 January 1993	30 December 1996	Social Democrats
Minister for Traffic	Jan Trøjborg	28 January 1994	30 December 1996	Social Democrats
Ministry of Social Affairs	Karen Jespersen	27 September 1994	23 February 2000	Social Democrats
Minister for Health	Yvonne Herløv Andersen	27 September 1994	30 December 1996	Centre Democrats
Minister for Building and Housing	Ole Løvig Simonsen	27 September 1994	23 March 1998	Social Democrats
Minister of Science	Frank Jensen	27 September 1994	30 December 1996	Social Democrats
Minister for Agriculture and Fisheries	Henrik Dam Kristensen	27 September 1994	30 December 1996	Social Democrats

Preceded by Poul Nyrup Rasmussen I	Cabinet of Denmark; 1994 – 1996	Succeeded by Poul Nyrup Rasmussen III
