= Minister for Development Cooperation (Denmark) =

Former government ministerial office

Minister of Development Cooperation
- Minister for udviklingssamarbejde
- State coat of arms of the Kingdom of Denmark

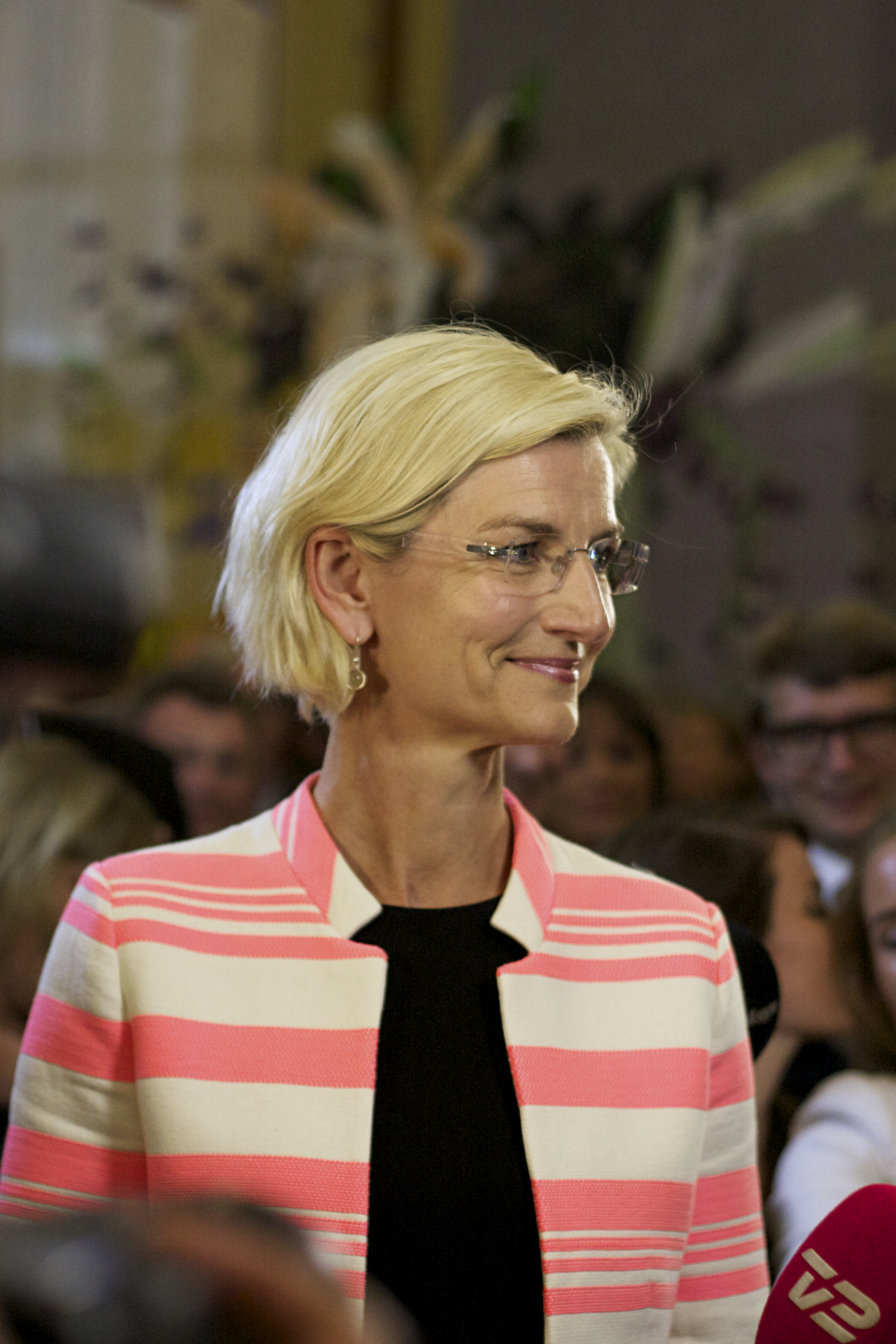
- Longest serving Ulla Tørnæs; 18 February 2005–23 February 2010; 28 November 2016–27 June 2019
- Ministry of Foreign Affairs
- Type: Minister
- Member of: Cabinet; State Council
- Reports to: the Prime minister
- Seat: Slotsholmen
- Appointer: The Monarch (on the advice of the Prime Minister)
- Formation: 25 January 1993; 33 years ago
- First holder: Helle Degn
- Final holder: Dan Jørgensen
- Abolished: 29 August 2024; 2 years ago
- Succession: depending on the order in the State Council
- Deputy: State secretary for Development Policy
- Salary: 1.400.192,97 DKK (€187,839), in 2024

Minister for Development Cooperation of Denmark (Danish: Udviklingsminister) was a Danish Government ministerial office. The office was introduced with the Cabinet of Poul Nyrup Rasmussen I on 25 January 1993.

== List of ministers ==
No.	Portrait	Name (born–died)	Term of office			Political party	Cabinet	Ref.
No.	Portrait	Name (born–died)	Took office	Left office	Time in office	Political party	Cabinet	Ref.
Minister for Development Cooperation (Minister for udviklingsbistand)
1		Helle Degn (born 1946)	25 January 1993	27 September 1994	1 year, 245 days	Social Democrats	P. N. Rasmussen I	
2		Poul Nielson (born 1943)	27 September 1994	10 July 1999	4 years, 286 days	Social Democrats	P. N. Rasmussen II–III–IV	
3		Jan Trøjborg (1955–2012)	10 July 1999	21 December 2000	1 year, 164 days	Social Democrats	P. N. Rasmussen IV	
4		Anita Bay Bundegaard (born 1963)	21 December 2000	27 November 2001	341 days	Social Liberals	P. N. Rasmussen IV	
None (task assumed by the Minister of Foreign Affairs); 27 November 2001 – 2 August 2004
5		Bertel Haarder (born 1944)	2 August 2004	18 February 2005	200 days	Venstre	A. F. Rasmussen I	
6		Ulla Tørnæs (born 1962)	18 February 2005	23 February 2010	5 years, 5 days	Venstre	A. F. Rasmussen II–III; L. L. Rasmussen I	
7		Søren Pind (born 1969)	23 February 2010	3 October 2011	1 year, 222 days	Venstre	L. L. Rasmussen I	
8		Christian Friis Bach (born 1966)	3 October 2011	21 November 2013	2 years, 49 days	Social Liberals	Thorning-Schmidt I	
Minister for Development Cooperation (Udviklingsminister)
9		Rasmus Helveg Petersen (born 1968)	21 November 2013	3 February 2014	74 days	Social Liberals	Thorning-Schmidt I	
Minister for Trade and Development Cooperation (Handels- og udviklingsminister)
10		Mogens Jensen (born 1963)	3 February 2014	28 June 2015	1 year, 145 days	Social Democrats	Thorning-Schmidt II	
None (task assumed by the Minister of Foreign Affairs); 28 June 2015 – 28 November 2016
Minister for Development Cooperation (Minister for udviklingssamarbejde)
6		Ulla Tørnæs (born 1962)	28 November 2016	27 June 2019	2 years, 211 days	Venstre	L. L. Rasmussen III	
11		Rasmus Prehn (born 1973)	27 June 2019	18 November 2020	1 year, 144 days	Social Democrats	Frederiksen I	
12		Flemming Møller Mortensen (born 1963)	19 November 2020	15 December 2022	2 years, 26 days	Social Democrats	Frederiksen I	
Minister for Development Cooperation and Global Climate Policy (Minister for udviklingssamarbejde og global klimapolitik)
13		Dan Jørgensen (born 1975)	15 December 2022	29 August 2024	1 year, 258 days	Social Democrats	Frederiksen II	
None (task assumed by the Minister of Foreign Affairs); 29 August 2024 – present
