= Karen Jespersen =

Danish politician

Karen Moustgaard Jespersen (born 17 January 1947 in Copenhagen) is a Danish journalist and former politician representing the party Venstre.

== Early life ==
She's the daughter of labourer Knud Jespersen and delicatessen owner Anna Jespersen. She attended Nansensgade School from 1954 to 1964. Then, she graduated in History and Archaeology at University of Copenhagen.

She's married to Ralf Pittelkow.

== Career ==
Jespersen served as the editor of now defunct Politisk Revy magazine from 1974 to 1977. She was a member of the Left Socialists, represented the Social Democrats and was Social Minister from 25 January 1993 to 28 January 1994 in the Cabinet of Poul Nyrup Rasmussen I, and 27 September 1994 to 23 February 2000 in the Cabinet of Poul Nyrup Rasmussen II, III and IV. She was Interior Minister 23 February 2000 to 27 November 2001 in the Cabinet of Poul Nyrup Rasmussen IV. She has been a member of the Folketing since 12 December 1990. On 12 September 2007 she replaced Eva Kjer Hansen as Social Minister and Minister for Equal Rights in the Cabinet of Anders Fogh Rasmussen II, thus becoming the first Danish politician to have represented both political wings as a government minister. On 23 November 2007, the Ministry of Interior Affairs, Ministry of Family and Consumer Affairs and the Social Ministry were merged into a Ministry of Welfare, and Jespersen became Minister of Welfare in the Cabinet of Anders Fogh Rasmussen III. She held this post until April 2009 when Denmark changed prime ministers to Lars Løkke Rasmussen.

Eisenhower Fellowships selected Karen Jespersen in 1987 to represent Denmark. In the book Islamister og Naivister: et anklageskrift (Islamists and Naivists: a bill of indictment), which she wrote together with her husband, political commentator Ralf Pittelkow, she warns of an underestimation of the Islamist threat.

On 14 January 2007, she declared that she was no longer member of the Social Democrats. In a press release 1 February 2007, the Liberal Party Venstre announced that Karen Jespersen had joined the party and would be a candidate for parliament (Folketinget) in the next election. 18 June 2015 was her last day in the Folketing.

Political offices
Preceded by Else Winther Andersen	Social Minister of Denmark; 25 January 1993 – 28 January 1994	Succeeded by Bente Juncker
Preceded by Yvonne Herløv Andersen	Social Minister of Denmark; 27 September 1994 – 23 February 2000	Succeeded by Henrik Dam Kristensen
Preceded by Thorkild Simonsen	Interior Minister of Denmark; 23 February 2000 – 27 November 2001	Succeeded by Lars Løkke Rasmussen
Preceded by Eva Kjer Hansen	Social Minister of Denmark; 12 September 2007 – 23 November 2007	Succeeded by Office abolished
Preceded by Eva Kjer Hansen	Minister for Equal Rights of Denmark; 2007 – 2009	Succeeded by Inger Støjberg
Preceded by New office	Minister for Social Welfare; 2007 – 2009	Succeeded by Karen Ellemann (Minister of the Interior and Social Affairs)
