= Birte Weiss =

Danish journalist and politician (1941–2026)

Minister of IT and Science
- Minister of Science (1999 – 2000)
- In office 10 July 1999 – 27 November 2001
- Prime Minister: Poul Nyrup Rasmussen
- Preceded by: Jan Trøjborg
- Succeeded by: Helge Sander

Minister of Health
- In office 30 December 1996 – 23 March 1998
- Prime Minister: Poul Nyrup Rasmussen
- Preceded by: Yvonne Herløv Andersen
- Succeeded by: Carsten Koch

Minister for Ecclesiastical Affairs
- In office 27 September 1994 – 30 December 1996
- Prime Minister: Poul Nyrup Rasmussen
- Preceded by: A. O. Andersen
- Succeeded by: Ole Vig Jensen

Minister of the Interior
- In office 25 January 1993 – 20 October 1997
- Prime Minister: Poul Nyrup Rasmussen
- Preceded by: Thor Pedersen
- Succeeded by: Thorkild Simonsen

Personal details
- Born: 1 May 1941
- Died: 14 March 2026 (aged 84)
- Party: Social Democrats
- Spouse: Ove Weiss (m. 1965)
- Children: 2
- Education: University of Copenhagen
- Occupation: Journalist

Birte Weiss (1 May 1941 – 14 March 2026) was a Danish journalist and social democrat politician, who served in various capacities in the government of Denmark. She worked as a journalist for the newspaper Weekendavisen.

== Early life and education ==
Weiss was born on 1 May 1941. She was trained as a journalist with the social democrat press from 1960 to 1963. Later, she attended the University of Copenhagen and studied there comparative literature.

== Career ==
Weiss began her career as a journalist, working for Demokraten and then for Information. Next, she involved in politics and became a member of the Danish Parliament for the Social Democrats for two terms; from 1971 to 1973 and from 1975 to 2001. She was the chairperson of the council of Denmark’s Radio/TV from 1981 to 1986. She served as the deputy chairperson of the social democrats from 1994 to 1996 and first vice-chairperson of the Parliament from 1998 to 1999.

She assumed various cabinet positions. Her first ministerial post was the minister of interior, and she served in the office from 1993 to 1997. She resigned from the post on 20 October, and Thorkild Simonsen succeeded her in the post. She was also the minister of church affairs which she held from 1994 to 1996. She was appointed minister of health in 1996, and her tenure lasted until 1998. Lastly, she served as the minister of research and information technology from 1999 to 2001.

=== Activities ===
When she was the interior minister Weiss delivered a bill in 1996, stating that a foreigner, who is guilty of drug-related crime, should be deported from Denmark. A documentary, En minister krydser sit spor (Danish: A Minister Backtracks), filmed by Danish director Ulrik Holmstrup in 2000 is about her activities as interior minister. It narrates the dilemma she faced in dealing with Bosnian refugees in the country.

== Personal life and death ==
Weiss was married and had two sons. She died on 14 March 2026, at the age of 84.
