= Ralf Pittelkow =

- Born: 9 April 1948; Sønderborg, Denmark
- Occupation: Editor-in-chief
- Spouse: Karen Jespersen

Ralf Pittelkow (born 9 April 1948 in Sønderborg, Denmark) is a Danish journalist and publisher. He is associated with the online news site Den Korte Avis, where he serves as editor-in-chief.

From 1973 to 1992, he worked as an assistant professor and associate professor at the Department of Comparative Literature at the University of Copenhagen. For 17 years, until the end of 2011, he was a political commentator at Morgenavisen Jyllands-Posten.

Together with his wife, he founded Den Korte Avis in 2012.

The credibility of Den Korte Avis has been the subject of public debate. In 2014, the Danish Union of Journalists criticised the site, stating that it affected the reputation of journalists and did not meet standards expected of a newspaper.

In December 2016, several advertisers, including McDonald's, IKEA, Nordea, Alm. Brand, and Doctors Without Borders, withdrew advertising from the site following concerns about the accuracy of some of its content.

Pittelkow served as a personal assistant to former Prime Minister of Denmark Poul Nyrup Rasmussen. He is married to politician Karen Jespersen. He has been associated with political parties including the Left Socialists, the Socialist People's Party, and the Social Democrats.
