= Bente Juncker =

Member of the Folketing for the Eastern Copenhagen constituency
- In office 8 December 1981 – 20 September 1994

Minister of Social Affairs
- In office 28 January 1994 – 11 February 1994
- Monarch: Margrethe II
- Prime Minister: Poul Nyrup Rasmussen
- Preceded by: Karen Jespersen
- Succeeded by: Yvonne Herløv Andersen

Personal details
- Born: 9 May 1944 (age 82) Slagelse, German occupied Denmark
- Party: Centre Democrats
- Spouse: Peter J. Torben (m. 1967; div. 1986)

Bente Juncker (born 9 May 1944) is a Danish politician. A member of the Centre Democrats (CD) political party, she joined the party in 1973, becoming a member of its board in Hørsholm and was appointed secretary of their National Organisation in 1978. Juncker was elected to represent the Eastern Copenhagen constituency in the Folketing in 1981 and held the seat until 1994. She was appointed the minister of social affairs by Prime Minister Poul Nyrup Rasmussen in early 1994 but she had to resign after 14 days following revelations in the Danish press of false allegations of sexual abuse she had made and complaints of the placement of eight mentally disabled people near her summer house and the noise they were making. Juncker was appointed a Knight of the Order of the Dannebrog in 1991.

== Early life ==
Juncker was born in Slagelse on 9 May 1944 to the clerk Mathilde Hjorslev. Her mother was in the military; Juncker never knew her father. Juncker's mother thought her to be unruly, so she sent her to the French Saint Joseph Sisters' School, Saint Joseph Institute school, from where she took her secondary school leaving examination in 1962. She took a mathematical matriculation exam at the Nørrebro Gymnasium in 1966, and went on to enroll at the Copenhagen Business School to study economics but she dropped out before completing the degree.

== Career ==
From 1962 to 1963 and again from 1966 to 1968, Juncker worked as a secretary at the Copenhagen Telephone Company (KTAS). When the Centre Democrats (CD) political party was established by Erhard Jakobsen from a separation from the Social Democrats in 1973, she joined the party because she was sympathetic to the party's leader. In 1974, Juncker became a member of the CD board in Hørsholm and was appointed secretary of the CD's National Organisation in 1978. She was also a member of the school commission in the Hørsholm Municipality from 1978 to 1981.

At the 1979 Danish general election, Juncker stood for election to the Husum constituency of the Folketing; the election saw the CD party drop from 11 to 6 seats and she did not get elected to parliament. In the following general election on 8 December 1981, the CD party won 15 seats and Juncker was elected to represent the Eastern Copenhagen constituency. She had interests in school policy, tax policy and social policy. In 1983, Juncker became secretary of the CD parliamentary group and was made its deputy chairman in 1984. She was made a member of the Committee on Social Affairs in 1988.

When the CD party became part of a Social Democratic-led four-party government in 1993, Juncker was appointed the group's chairman, attempting to maintain the CD's key issues at a time when the party was forced to compromise due to its participation in the government. On 28 January 1994, as part of a cabinet reshuffle, she was appointed the minister of social affairs by Prime Minister Poul Nyrup Rasmussen, replacing Karen Jespersen. Shortly after her appointment, the Danish press learnt of a complaint that she and her partner Uffe Thorndahl had made in 1990 regarding the temporary placement of eight mentally disabled people close to their summer house in Råbylille on Møn because of the noise they were making. Juncker had also made false allegations that the head of the institution had committed sexual abuse against the mentally ill. He responded by filing a defamation case against her, and she was required to resign her ministerial post on 11 February 1994, 14 days after being appointed to do the job. Juncker was replaced as minister by Yvonne Herløv Andersen and was expelled from the CD the following month. She remained an independent in the Folketing until she left politics after the 1994 general election and became a housewife.

== Personal life ==
Juncker was married to the accountant Peter J. Torben from 1967 to 1986. She later moved in with Thorndahl. In 1991, Juncker was appointed a Knight of the Order of the Dannebrog.
