= Thorkild Simonsen =

Danish politician (1926–2022)

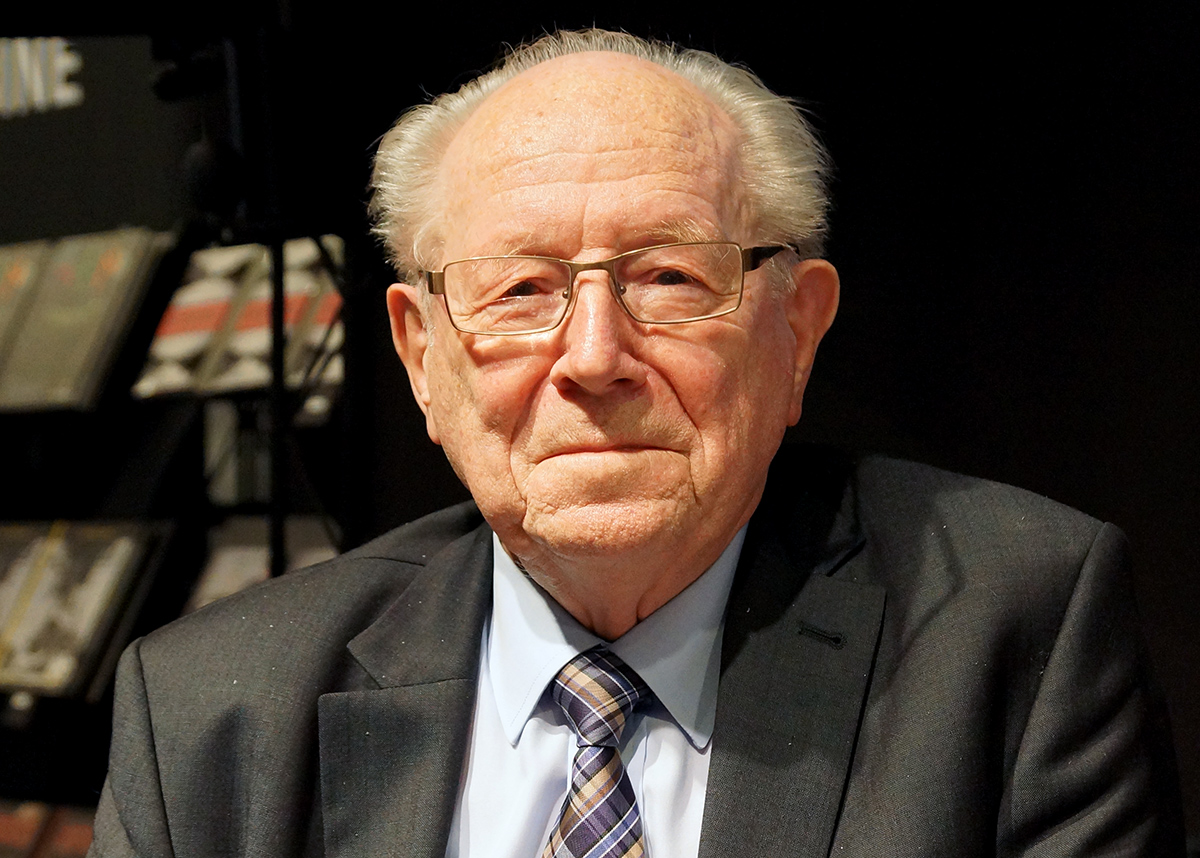
Simonsen in 2014

Thorkild Simonsen (7 July 1926 – 4 September 2022) was a Danish politician and member of the Social Democrats. He was mayor of Århus municipality from 1982 to 1997 and Interior Minister of Denmark from 1997 to 2000 in the Cabinets of Poul Nyrup Rasmussen III and IV.

Simonsen was a member of Århus city council from 1966 to 1997 and mayor from 1 January 1982 to 1997, when he left the position to become Minister of Interior Affairs. Prime Minister Poul Nyrup Rasmussen had called for a tightening of the laws on immigration and refugee issues that the previous minister Birte Weiss refused to implement and caused her to resign in protest. Although Simonsen was not a member of parliament, he was the problem solver that Nyrup Rasmussen hoped would be able to bring greater clarity to the government's policy on the immigration and refugee issues, issues on which the government had received considerable criticism in particular by the Danish People's Party.

Simonsen died on 4 September 2022, at the age of 96.

== See also ==
- List of mayors of Aarhus

Political offices
Preceded by Birte Weiss	Interior Minister of Denmark; 20 October 1997 – 23 February 2000	Succeeded by Karen Jespersen
Preceded by Orla Hyllested	Mayor of Aarhus; 1982–1997	Succeeded by Flemming Knudsen
