= Poul Nielson =

Danish politician (born 1943)

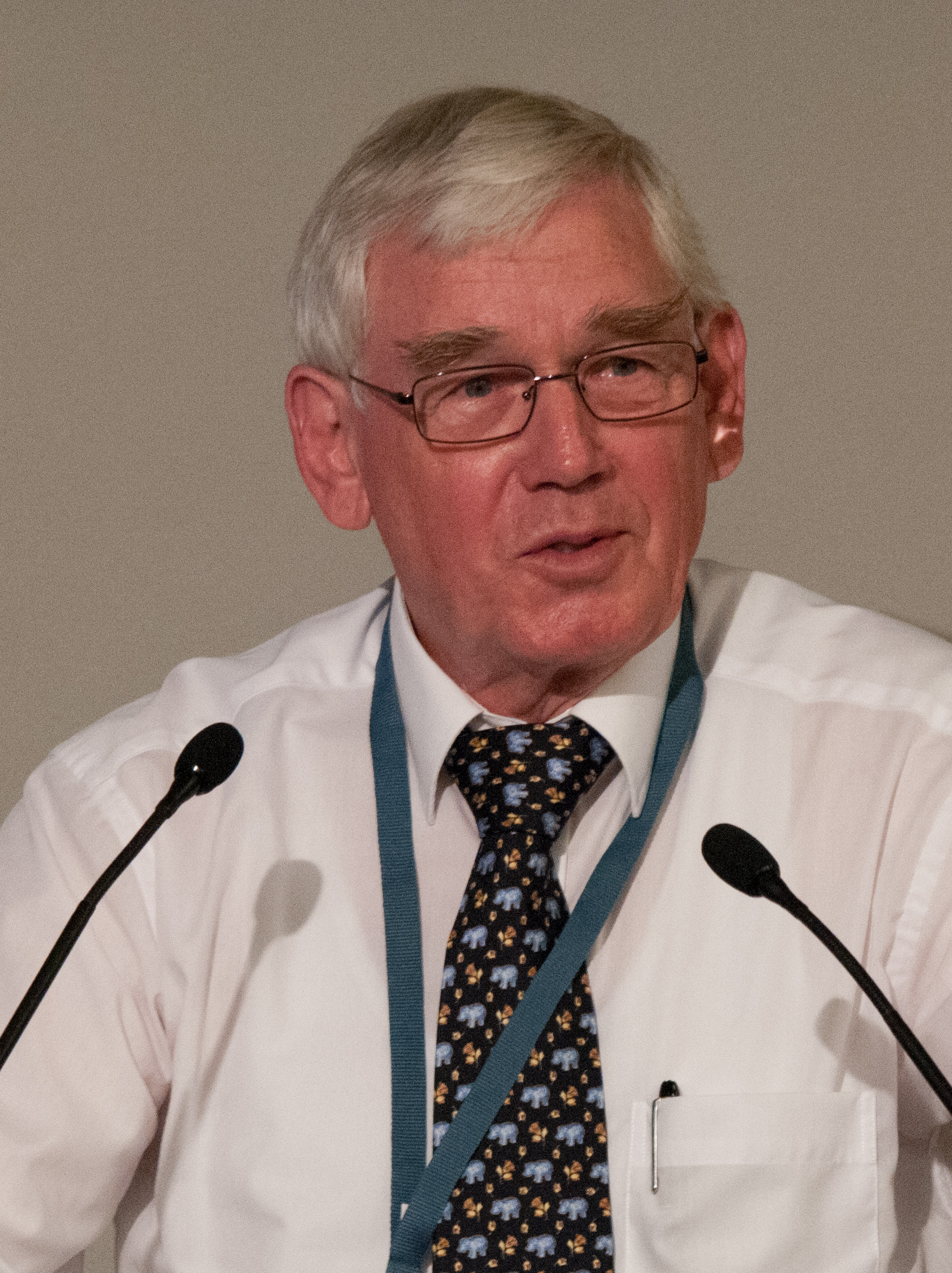
- Nielson in 2016

European Commissioner for Development and Humanitarian Aid
- In office 16 September 1999 – 21 November 2004
- President: Romano Prodi
- Preceded by: João de Deus Pinheiro
- Succeeded by: Louis Michel

Minister of Development Cooperation
- In office 27 September 1994 – 10 July 1999
- Preceded by: Helle Degn
- Succeeded by: Jan Trøjborg

Personal details
- Born: 11 April 1943 (age 83) Copenhagen, Denmark
- Party: Social Democrats
- Education: Aarhus University

Poul Nielson (born 11 April 1943) is a Danish politician from the Social Democrats who has held the posts as Energy Minister and Minister of Development Cooperation, and served as European Commissioner for Development and Humanitarian Aid from 1999 until 2004.

== Early life and education ==
Born in Copenhagen, Nielson graduated in political science from Aarhus University in 1972.

== Political career ==
During his long career in Danish politics, Nielson served as Energy Minister in the fourth and fifth cabinets of Prime Minister Anker Jørgensen from 26 October 1979 to 10 September 1982, and as Minister for Development Cooperation in the Cabinet of Poul Nyrup Rasmussen II, III, and IV from 27 September 1994 to 10 July 1999. By the time he left office, he was the EU's longest-serving development minister. In 1999, he was also the EU's official candidate for leading the United Nations Development Programme (UNDP); the post instead went to Mark Malloch Brown.

On 17 September 1999 Nielson became European Commissioner for Development and Humanitarian Aid when the Prodi Commission took office. Early in his tenure, the EU signed the Cotonou Agreement with its 71 partners from the African, Caribbean and Pacific Group of States (ACP) which put relations between Europe and its former colonies on a new footing for the following 20 years.

In 2002, Nielson and Margot Wallström led the European Commission's team at the World Summit on Sustainable Development. In response to what later became known as the 'decency gap' left by US President George W. Bush's controversial refusal to release funds already approved by Congress, Nielson also led efforts for the EU to pledge additional support for the United Nations Population Fund (UNFPA) in 2004.

== Life after politics ==
In April 2015, Nielson was asked to conduct a strategic review of the labour market on behalf of the Nordic Council.

Political offices
Preceded by New office	Energy Minister; 26 October 1979 – 10 September 1982	Succeeded by Knud Enggaard
Preceded by Helle Degn	Minister for Development Cooperation; 27 September 1994 – 10 July 1999	Succeeded by Jan Trøjborg
Preceded by New office	European Commissioner for Development and Humanitarian Aid; 17 September 1999 – 22 November 2004 (together with Joe Borg from 1 May 2004)	Succeeded by Louis Michel
Preceded by Ritt Bjerregaard	Danish European Commissioner; 17 September 1999 – 22 November 2004	Succeeded by Mariann Fischer Boel
