= Poul Nyrup Rasmussen III Cabinet =

Danish government from 1996 to 1998

3rd Poul Nyrup Rasmussen
- 68th Cabinet of Denmark

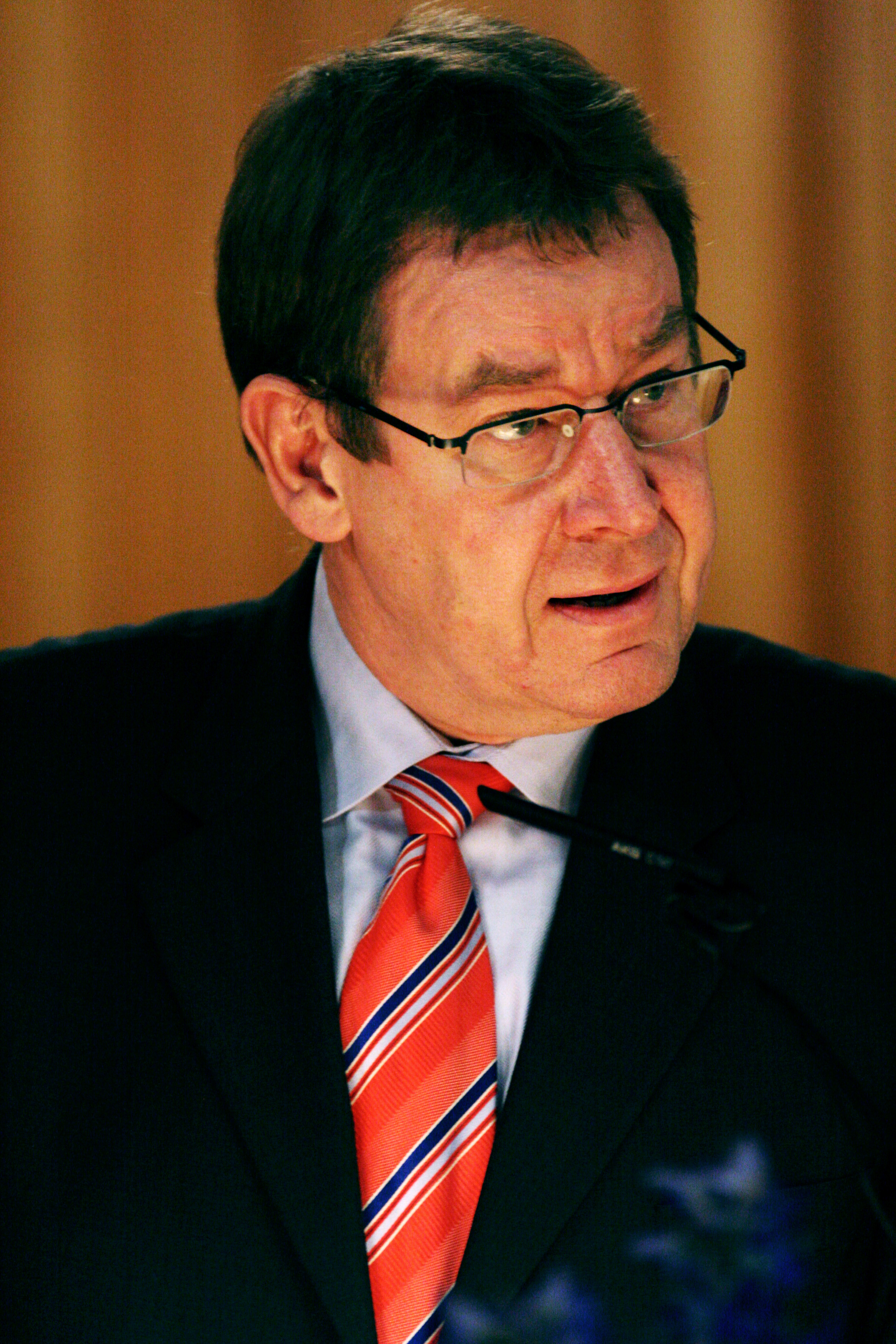
- Prime Minister Rasmussen
- Date formed: 30 December 1996
- Date dissolved: 23 March 1998

People and organisations
- Head of state: Margrethe II
- Head of government: Poul Nyrup Rasmussen
- No. of ministers: 20
- Ministers removed: 1
- Total no. of members: 21
- Member parties: Social Democrats; Social Liberals; Supported by: Green Left; Red-Green Alliance; Centre Democrats
- Status in legislature: Minority coalition government
- Opposition parties: Venstre; Conservatives; Progress; Independent (1)

History
- Election: None
- Legislature term: 1994–1998
- Predecessor: P. N. Rasmussen II
- Successor: P. N. Rasmussen IV

After the Centre Democrats left the government coalition in 1996, the sitting Danish Prime Minister Poul Nyrup Rasmussen was able to form a government coalition of his own Social Democrats and the Danish Social Liberal Party. The resulting cabinet, which replaced the Cabinet of Poul Nyrup Rasmussen II, was formed on 30 December 1996 and was called the Cabinet of Poul Nyrup Rasmussen III.

The cabinet was replaced by the Cabinet of Poul Nyrup Rasmussen IV on 23 March 1998 after the 1998 Danish parliamentary election.

== Cabinet changes ==
The cabinet was changed on 20 October 1997.

Some periods in the table below start before 30 December 1996 or end after 23 March 1998 because the minister was in the Cabinet of Poul Nyrup Rasmussen II or the Cabinet of Poul Nyrup Rasmussen IV as well.

| Portfolio | Minister | Took office | Left office | Party |
Prime Minister's Office
| Prime Minister | Poul Nyrup Rasmussen | 25 January 1993 | 27 November 2001 | Social Democrats |
| Minister of Economic Affairs & Minister for Nordic Cooperation | Marianne Jelved | 27 September 1994 | 27 November 2001 | Social Liberals |
| Minister for Foreign Affairs | Niels Helveg Petersen | 25 January 1993 | 21 December 2000 | Social Liberals |
| Minister for Finance | Mogens Lykketoft | 25 January 1993 | 21 December 2000 | Social Democrats |
| Minister for the Environment and Energy | Svend Auken | 27 September 1994 | 27 November 2001 | Social Democrats |
| Minister for Science | Jytte Hilden | 30 December 1996 | 23 March 1998 | Social Democrats |
| Minister of Education & Minister for Ecclesiastical Affairs | Ole Vig Jensen | 30 December 1996 | 23 March 1998 | Social Liberals |
| Minister of Defence | Hans Hækkerup | 25 January 1993 | 21 December 2000 | Social Democrats |
| Minister of the Interior | Birte Weiss | 25 January 1993 | 20 October 1997 | Social Democrats |
| Minister of the Interior | Thorkild Simonsen | 20 October 1997 | 23 February 2000 | Social Democrats |
| Minister for Food | Henrik Dam Kristensen | 30 December 1996 | 23 February 2000 | Social Democrats |
| Minister for Justice | Frank Jensen | 30 December 1996 | 27 November 2001 | Social Democrats |
| Minister of Social Affairs | Karen Jespersen | 27 September 1994 | 23 February 2000 | Social Democrats |
| Minister for Business Affairs | Jan Trøjborg | 30 December 1996 | 23 March 1998 | Social Democrats |
| Minister for Culture | Ebbe Lundgaard | 30 December 1996 | 23 March 1998 | Social Liberals |
| Minister of Labor | Jytte Andersen | 25 January 1993 | 23 March 1998 | Social Democrats |
| Minister of Traffic | Bjørn Westh | 30 December 1996 | 23 March 1998 | Social Democrats |
| Minister for Housing | Ole Løvig Simonsen | 27 September 1994 | 23 March 1998 | Social Democrats |
| Minister for Taxation | Carsten Koch | 1 November 1994 | 23 March 1998 | Social Democrats |
| Minister for Health | Birte Weiss | 30 December 1996 | 23 March 1998 | Social Democrats |
| Minister for Development Cooperation | Poul Nielson | 27 September 1994 | 10 July 1999 | Social Democrats |

| Preceded by Poul Nyrup Rasmussen II | Cabinet of Denmark; 1996 – 1998 | Succeeded by Poul Nyrup Rasmussen IV |
