= Mogens Lykketoft =

Danish politician (born 1946)

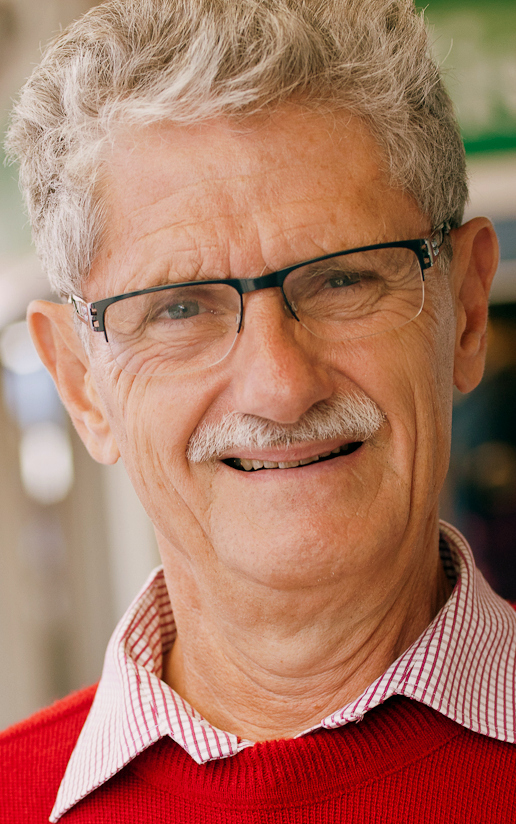
- Lykketoft in 2011

President of the United Nations General Assembly
- In office 16 September 2015 – 13 September 2016
- Preceded by: Sam Kutesa
- Succeeded by: Peter Thomson

Speaker of the Folketing
- In office 29 September 2011 – 3 July 2015
- Monarch: Margrethe II
- Preceded by: Thor Pedersen
- Succeeded by: Pia Kjærsgaard

Leader of the Social Democrats
- In office 14 December 2002 – 12 April 2005
- Preceded by: Poul Nyrup Rasmussen
- Succeeded by: Helle Thorning-Schmidt

Minister of Foreign Affairs
- In office 21 December 2000 – 27 November 2001
- Prime Minister: Poul Nyrup Rasmussen
- Preceded by: Niels Helveg Petersen
- Succeeded by: Per Stig Møller

Minister of Finance
- In office 25 January 1993 – 21 December 2000
- Prime Minister: Poul Nyrup Rasmussen
- Preceded by: Henning Dyremose
- Succeeded by: Pia Gjellerup

Minister of Taxation
- In office 20 January 1981 – 10 September 1982
- Prime Minister: Anker Jørgensen
- Preceded by: Karl Hjortnæs
- Succeeded by: Isi Foighel

Personal details
- Born: 9 January 1946 (age 80) Copenhagen, Denmark
- Party: Social Democrats
- Spouse(s): Aase Toft (1967–1979); Helle Mollerup (1980–1986); Jytte Hilden (1987–2004); Mette Holm (2005–present)
- Children: Maja; Kit
- Education: University of Copenhagen
- Website: Official website

Axel Mogens Leif Lykketoft (Danish pronunciation: [ˈmɔːwn̩s ˈløkəˌtsʰʌft]; born 9 January 1946) is a Danish politician who served as Leader of the Social Democrats (Socialdemokraterne) from 2002 to 2005.

He succeeded Poul Nyrup Rasmussen as party leader. After losing the 2005 parliamentary election, he resigned his office. In the Cabinets of Poul Nyrup Rasmussen I, II, III and IV which governed from 1993 to 2001, he held positions as Finance Minister and Foreign Minister. During the cabinet of Helle Thorning Schmidt from 2011 to 2015 he was Speaker of the Folketing.

In June 2015 he was unanimously elected the President of the United Nations General Assembly presiding over the 70th session of the General Assembly beginning 15 September 2015.

== Early life ==
Lykketoft was born out of wedlock and put up for adoption. He was adopted twice, since his first adoptive father died when he was only a few months old. The second time he was adopted by shopkeeper Axel Lykketoft and Martha Lykketoft. He was the only child in the family and had, according to himself, a safe and secure childhood.

Lykketoft matriculated in mathematics from Frederiksberg Gymnasium, an upper secondary school, in 1964 and went on to study at the University of Copenhagen. In 1971 he became Cand.polit. (a Master's degree in economics by the University of Copenhagen). At Copenhagen University Lykketoft became a member of Frit Forum, the Social Democratic student organisation. From 1965 to 1970 he was part of its management committee and he was its national chairman for the academic year 1968/69.

From 1975 to 1981 he was department head in "The Economic Council of the Labour Movement", a Danish think tank made up of trade union leaders and Social Democratic MPs. He had been working at the think tank since 1966.

== Political career ==
=== Member of the Folketing ===
On 20 January 1981 Prime Minister Anker Jørgensen picked him to be Taxation Minister. He was minister for less than 20 months before the Social Democratic government resigned. In the 1981 general election he became MP for the Copenhagen County constituency. He has been member of the Folketing (the Danish parliament) ever since, standing for election eleven times. Since 2007 he has been representing Greater Copenhagen greater constituency.

In 1987 he unsuccessfully tried to be kingmaker at the election of a new leader of the Danish Social Democrats. The attempt put him in opposition to the new leader Svend Auken. Five years later he was more successful when his new candidate, Poul Nyrup Rasmussen, challenged and defeated Auken at an extraordinary congress of the Social Democrats.

After the resignation of the Conservative/Liberal government in January 1993 Lykketoft became Finance Minister in the cabinets of Poul Nyrup Rasmussen (I, II, III, IV). He is the longest serving Finance Minister in modern Danish history. He became Foreign Minister in December 2000 and continued as such until the government lost the general election of 2001.

After Poul Nyrup resigned Lykketoft was elected Leader of the Social Democrats, a position he held until he failed to unseat the Liberal/Conservative government of Anders Fogh Rasmussen at the general election of 2005. From 2005 to 2011 he was the Foreign Policy Spokesman for the Social Democratic parliamentary group.

After the 2019 Danish general election, Lykketoft stepped down from his position as an MP in the Folketing, bringing an end to his nearly 40-year tenure.

=== Speaker of Folketing ===
In October 2009 he became member of "the Præsidium of the Folketing" (the unified leadership of the Danish parliament). And after the election victory of the Socialist-Social Democrat-Social Liberal coalition in the 2011 general election he became President of the Parliament of Denmark.

As President or Speaker of the Folketing he has been on official visits to Turkey (2014), Iceland (2014), Slovakia (2013), Greece (2013), The Bundestag in Berlin (2013) and The United States Congress in Washington (2012). He has also been on work visits to Mexico (2014), Palestine (2014), Mongolia (2013), Burma, (2013), Albania (2012), Bulgaria (2012), Vietnam (2012) and Indonesia (2012).

=== UN General assembly ===
In March 2013, Lykketoft was nominated for the position of President of the United Nations General Assembly by the Danish government. He was the sole official candidate from the Western European and Others Group and received their nomination in November 2014. On 15 June 2015, he made history by becoming the first Dane ever to be elected to this prestigious position, and oversaw the Seventieth session of the United Nations General Assembly.

During his presidency, he would not resign as a Danish MP but rather take a leave of absence returning to the Folketing after his UN appointment has ended. He returned to the Danish parliament at the end of his United Nations presidency in October 2016.

== Israel/Palestine visit ==
During his February 2014 visit to Palestine he did not at the same time meet with Israeli officials, this made the speaker of the Knesset Yuli Edelstein express regret of the fact that Lykketoft unlike other world leaders decided not to include Israel in his visit of the region. Edelstein further said: "I do not understand how a visit to Gaza, which is controlled by Hamas, goes along with Denmark's democratic values."

Lykketoft said that he was keen to hear both parts in the conflict and he had tried to schedule a meeting with the speaker of the Knesset. But he was told that Edelstein was unable to meet him during his visit. During an interview Lykketoft stated: "There was this Israeli reaction from the spokesman in the foreign ministry that it was kind of diplomatically impolite to go to Palestine without having an arrangement with the Israeli side."

In December 2014 he was asked his opinion about the Swedish recognition of an independent Palestine state. He answered the interviewer:"I think the movement in European parliaments and from the government of Sweden to recognize the State of Palestine is a reaction to the observation that the present Israeli government has no intention to contribute to formation of a sovereign Palestinian state, while this is expressed by the vast majority of member states in the United Nations through numerous resolutions."

== Personal life ==
He was married for the first time in 1967 to librarian Aase Toft. The family lived in Albertslund and was next-door neighbors to his good friend Poul Nyrup Rasmussen and his family. in January 1979 Aase Lykketoft died from an intracranial hemorrhage. He has two children from his first marriage, Maja, born in 1969, and Kit, born in 1972. He also has five grandsons.

Two years after his first wife died he got married for the second time, this time to Helle Mollerup, the ex-wife of Poul Nyrup. In 1986 he divorced Helle Mollerup and later married MP Jytte Hilden. From 1993 to 1997 they were both ministers in the Cabinets of Poul Nyrup Rasmussen (I, II, III). They divorced in 2004. Since 2005 Lykketoft has been married to author Mette Holm. They have written three books together.

== Publications ==
- Editor of "Magtspil og Sikkerhed" (Power Play and Security), 1968
- Editor of "Kravet om lighed" (The Demand for Equality), 1973
- Author of "Skattereform '78?" (Tax Reform '78?), 1978
- Co-author of "Anno 2001 – en socialdemokratisk science fiction" (Anno 2001 – Social Democratic Science Fiction), 1986
- Author of "Sans og samling – en socialdemokratisk krønike" (Sense and Cohesion – A Social Democratic Chronicle), 1994
- Author of "Den danske model – en europæisk succeshistorie" (The Danish Model – a European success story), 2006
- With Mette Holm
  - "Kina drager" (China allures), 2006
  - "Kina – Kapitalisme med særlige kinesiske kendetegn" (China – Capitalism the Chinese way), 2008
  - "Burma Myanmar", 2012

Party political offices
Preceded by Poul Nyrup Rasmussen	Leader of the Social Democrats; 2002–2005	Succeeded by Helle Thorning-Schmidt
Political offices
Preceded by Henning Dyremose	Minister of Finance; 1993–2000	Succeeded by Pia Gjellerup
Preceded by Niels Helveg Petersen	Minister of Foreign Affairs; 2000–2001	Succeeded by Per Stig Møller
Preceded by Thor Pedersen	Speaker of the Folketing; 2011–2015	Succeeded by Pia Kjærsgaard
Diplomatic posts
Preceded by Sam Kutesa	President of the United Nations General Assembly; 2015–2016	Succeeded by Peter Thomson
