= Jytte Andersen =

Danish politician

Member of Parliament
- In office 1979–2007

Minister for Labour
- In office 25 January 1993 – 23 March 1998

Minister for Towns and Homes
- In office 23 March 1998 – 21 December 2000

Minister for Gender Equality
- In office 29 September 1998 – 21 December 2000

Personal details
- Born: 9 September 1942 (age 83) Copenhagen, Denmark
- Party: Social Democrats (Denmark)

Jytte Andersen (born 9 September 1942) is a Danish politician.

She was born in Copenhagen to Boye Johansen and Inga Johansen. She was elected member of Folketinget for the Social Democrats from 1979 to 2007. She was appointed Minister for Labour in Poul Nyrup Rasmussen's first, second, and third cabinets, from 25 January 1993 to 23 March 1998. She was also a member of Rasmussen's fourth cabinet, as Minister for Towns and Homes and Minister for Gender Equality.
