= Svend Bergstein =

Danish politician (1941–2014)

Minister of Higher Education and Science
- In office 25 January 1993 – 28 January 1994
- Prime Minister: Poul Nyrup Rasmussen
- Preceded by: Office established

Personal details
- Born: 7 July 1941 Copenhagen
- Died: 8 March 2014 (aged 72)
- Party: Center Democrats; Conservative People's Party

Svend Bergstein (7 July 1941 – 8 March 2014) was a Danish military officer and politician who was the first minister of higher education and science.

== Biography ==
Bergstein was born in Copenhagen on 7 July 1941. He joined the Royal Danish Air Force in 1971. He was promoted to the rank of captain in 1975 and became a major in 1980.

Bergstein was an advisor at the Ministry of Defense between 1988 and 1993. He was a national secretary of the Center Democrats. In 1993 he was appointed minister of higher education and science for the party in the cabinet led by Poul Nyrup Rasmussen. Bergstein was dismissed from the post in 1994 and he resigned from the Center Democrats following his dismissal. He then taught at the Defense Academy. He served as a military expert on the Danish television channels during the Gulf War in 1991. In 1995 he joined the Conservative People's Party. He served as a military attaché of Denmark in Sweden and Finland from 1995 to 1999. He was a section chief at the Defense Academy until 2001 when he retired with the rank lieutenant colonel. In 2007 Bergstein was elected as the head of Copenhagen branch of the Conservative People's Party.

Bergstein died on 8 March 2014 due to complications related to Alzheimer's disease.
