= Minister of Growth (Denmark) =

Danish cabinet position

- Vækstminister
- State coat of arms of the Kingdom of Denmark

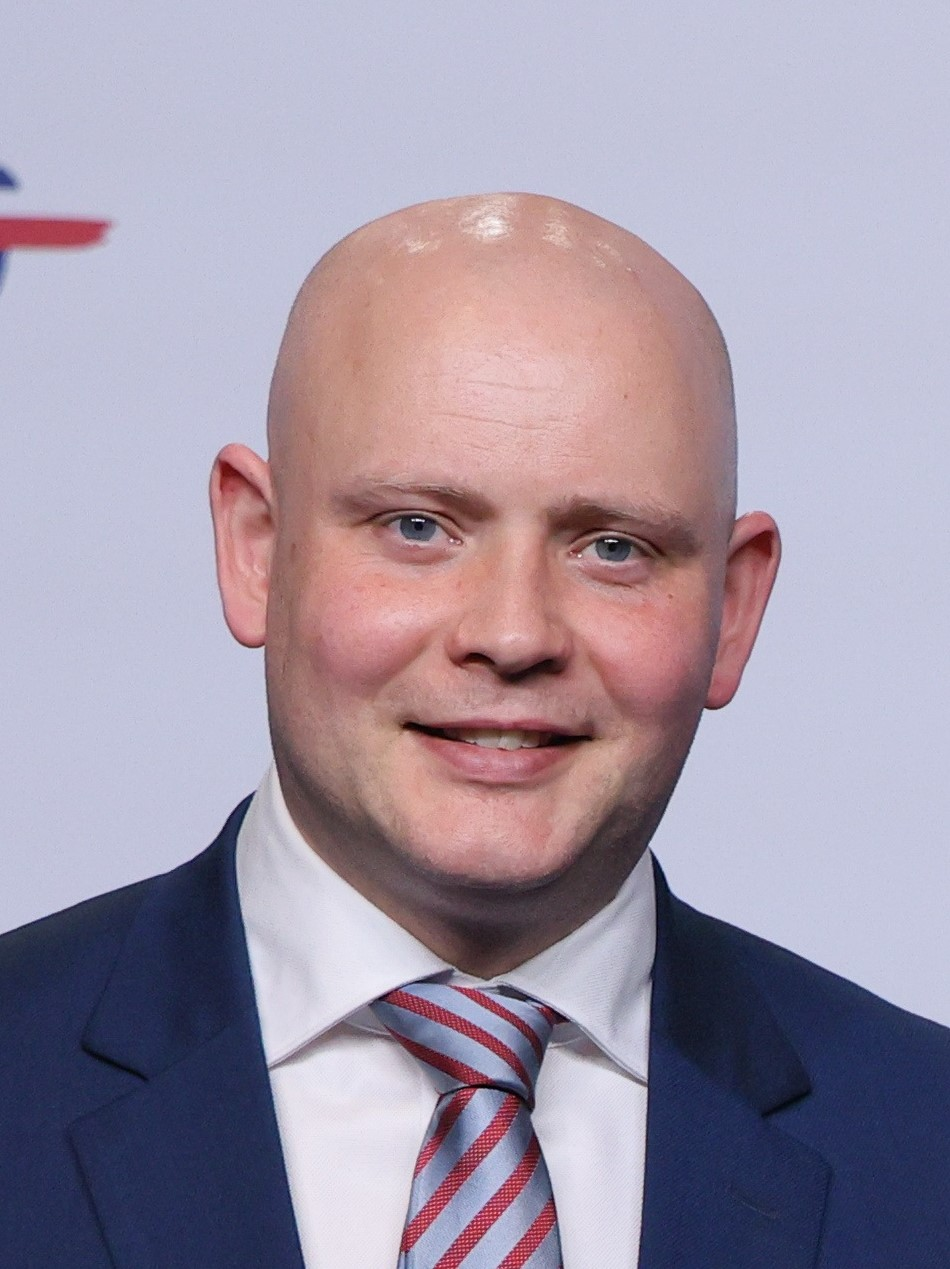
- Incumbent; Jakob Engel-Schmidt since 3 June 2026
- Ministry of Taxation
- Type: Minister
- Member of: Cabinet; State Council
- Reports to: the Prime minister
- Seat: Slotsholmen
- Appointer: The Monarch (on the advice of the Prime Minister)
- Formation: 3 October 2011; 14 years ago
- First holder: Ole Sohn
- Succession: depending on the order in the State Council
- Deputy: Permanent Secretary
- Salary: 1.624.503,02 DKK (€217,931), in 2026

The Danish Minister of Growth (Danish: Vækstminister), is a minister in the government of Denmark, with overall responsibility for strategy and policy across the Ministry of Taxation.

First established, in 2011, during the first cabinet of Helle Thorning-Schmidt and was connected by to the minister of business affairs. The position was abolished, in 2016, by the third cabinet of Lars Løkke Rasmussen. In 2026, it was reestablished by the third cabinet of Mette Frederiksen and connected with the minister of taxation.

== List of ministers ==
No.	Portrait	Name (born–died)	Term of office			Political party	Government	Ref.
No.	Portrait	Name (born–died)	Took office	Left office	Time in office	Political party	Government	Ref.
Minister of Business Affairs and Growth (Erhvervs- og Vækstminister)
1		Ole Sohn (born 1954)	3 October 2011	16 October 2012	1 year, 13 days	Green Left	Thorning-Schmidt I	
2		Annette Vilhelmsen (born 1959)	16 October 2012	9 August 2013	297 days	Green Left	Thorning-Schmidt I	
3		Henrik Sass Larsen (born 1966)	9 August 2013	28 June 2015	1 year, 323 days	Social Democrats	Thorning-Schmidt I–II	
4		Troels Lund Poulsen (born 1976)	28 June 2015	28 November 2016	1 year, 153 days	Venstre	L. L. Rasmussen II	
Minister of Taxation and Growth (Skatte- og vækstminister)
5		Jakob Engel-Schmidt (born 1977)	3 June 2026	Incumbent	96 days	Moderates	Frederiksen III	
