= Joe Borg =

Maltese politician and diplomat

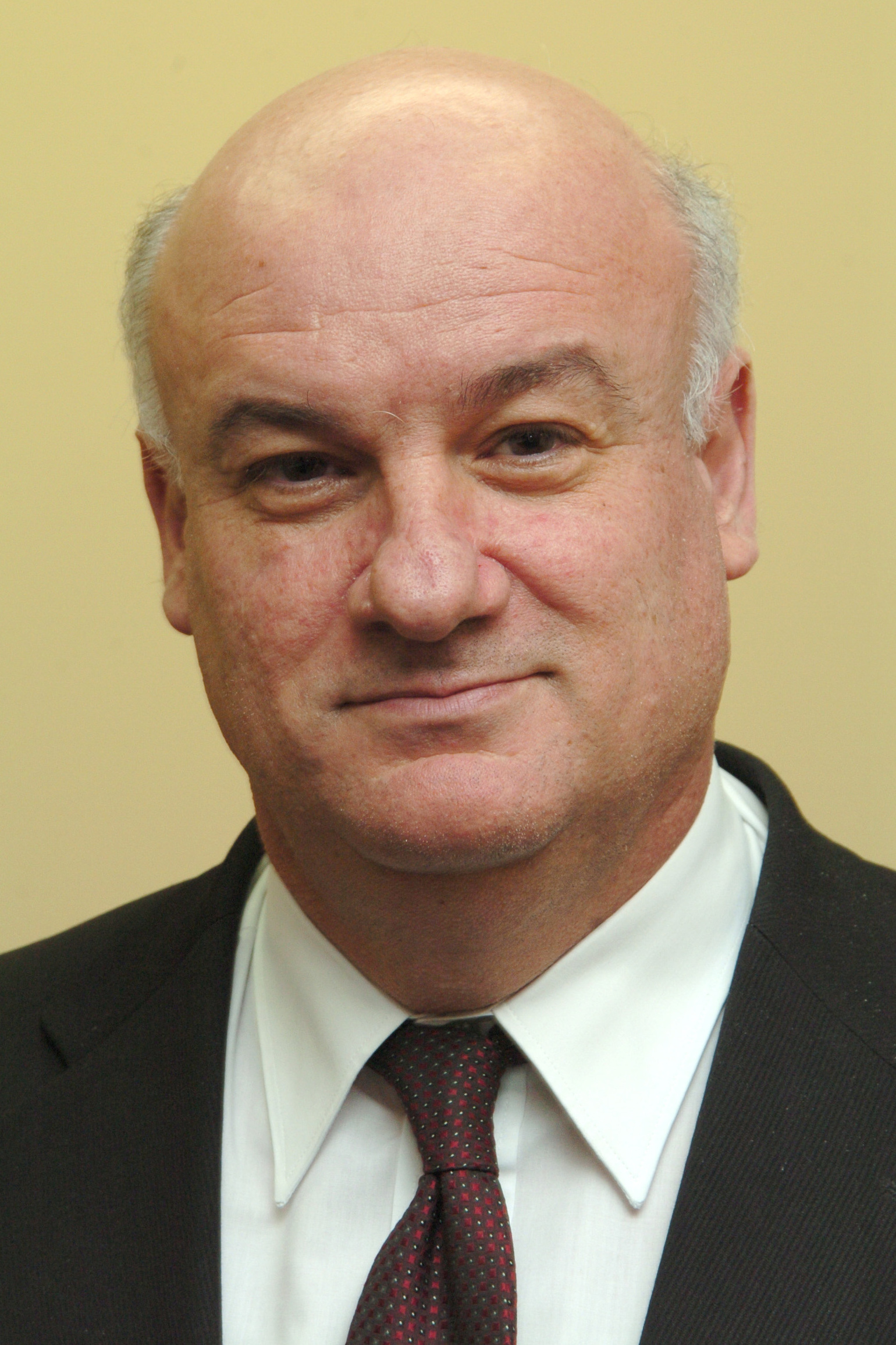
- Borg in 2004

European Commissioner for Fisheries and Maritime Affairs
- In office 22 November 2004 – 9 February 2010
- President: José Manuel Barroso
- Preceded by: Franz Fischler; Sandra Kalniete (Agriculture, Rural Development and Fisheries)
- Succeeded by: Maria Damanaki (Maritime Affairs and Fisheries)

European Commissioner for Development and Humanitarian Aid
- In office 1 May 2004 – 11 November 2004 Serving with Poul Nielson
- President: Romano Prodi
- Preceded by: Poul Nielson
- Succeeded by: Louis Michel

Personal details
- Born: 19 March 1952 (age 74)
- Party: Nationalist Party
- Education: Aberystwyth University (UK)

Joseph Borg (born 19 March 1952) is a Maltese politician and diplomat. Prior to taking up the post of Commissioner for Fisheries and Maritime Affairs, he was Minister of Foreign Affairs and led Malta's EU-accession negotiations.

== Career ==
He graduated Doctor of Laws in Malta in 1975 and Master of Laws in Wales in 1988.

Since 1979, Borg held various academic posts at the University of Malta, mainly focusing on company law, industrial law and European law. He also held various posts as legal adviser to companies and corporate bodies in Malta and other countries.

He began his career in politics as an advisor to the Foreign Minister on European Union matters from 1989 until 1995. From 1992 until 1995 he also served as member of the board of directors of the Maltese Central Bank. He was elected to Parliament in 1995 as a member of the Nationalist Party. He later served as Parliamentary Secretary within the Ministry of Foreign Affairs from 1998 to 1999 and was subsequently appointed Minister of Foreign Affairs in 1999. He held this post until he was nominated Commissioner for Fisheries and Maritime Affairs in 2004, upon Malta's accession to the EU.

== Fisheries Commissioner ==
As European Commissioner, he has been responsible for spearheading the EU's Integrated Maritime Policy and for innovative measures in fisheries, particularly through the involvement of stakeholders and the fight against illegal fishing activities, aimed at achieving sustainability in the sector. However, European fisheries policy has been unsuccessful so far in achieving sustainability, with 91% of fisheries on course to be classified as "overfished" by 2015, by which time the EU has committed to international targets for achieving sustainability. His head of cabinet was the German Michael Koehler.

Borg courted controversy among environmental groups by fiercely opposing the ban on the sale of Bluefin tuna, an increasingly rare fish which sells for thousands of pounds in Japan. His position on Bluefin tuna has been linked to the fact that the industry earns €100 million annually for Malta. Borg commented to the Times of Malta that "it is thanks to a lot of hard work at my level and at my staff's level that many of the proposals that are agreed by the commission took into account Maltese sensitivities".

Soon after the end of his term as Fisheries Commissioner in 2010, he was appointed chairman of the Mediterranean Academy of Diplomatic Studies and resumed lecturing at the University of Malta.

== Family ==
Borg is married to Isabelle with whom he has two children, Joseph and Clara.

== Honorary doctorates ==
Borg was awarded an honorary doctorate by the University of Essex in July 2003.

== Publications ==
1995: author of the Malta Companies Act

Political offices
New office	Maltese European Commissioner; 2004–2010	Succeeded by John Dalli
Preceded by Poul Nielson	European Commissioner for Development and Humanitarian Aid; 2004; Served alongside: Poul Nielson	Succeeded by Louis Michel
Preceded by Franz Fischler; Sandra Kalniete as European Commissioner for Agriculture, Rural Development and Fisheries	European Commissioner for Fisheries and Maritime Affairs; 2004–2010	Succeeded by Maria Damanaki as European Commissioner for Maritime Affairs and Fisheries
