= Thor Pedersen (politician) =

Danish politician (born 1945)

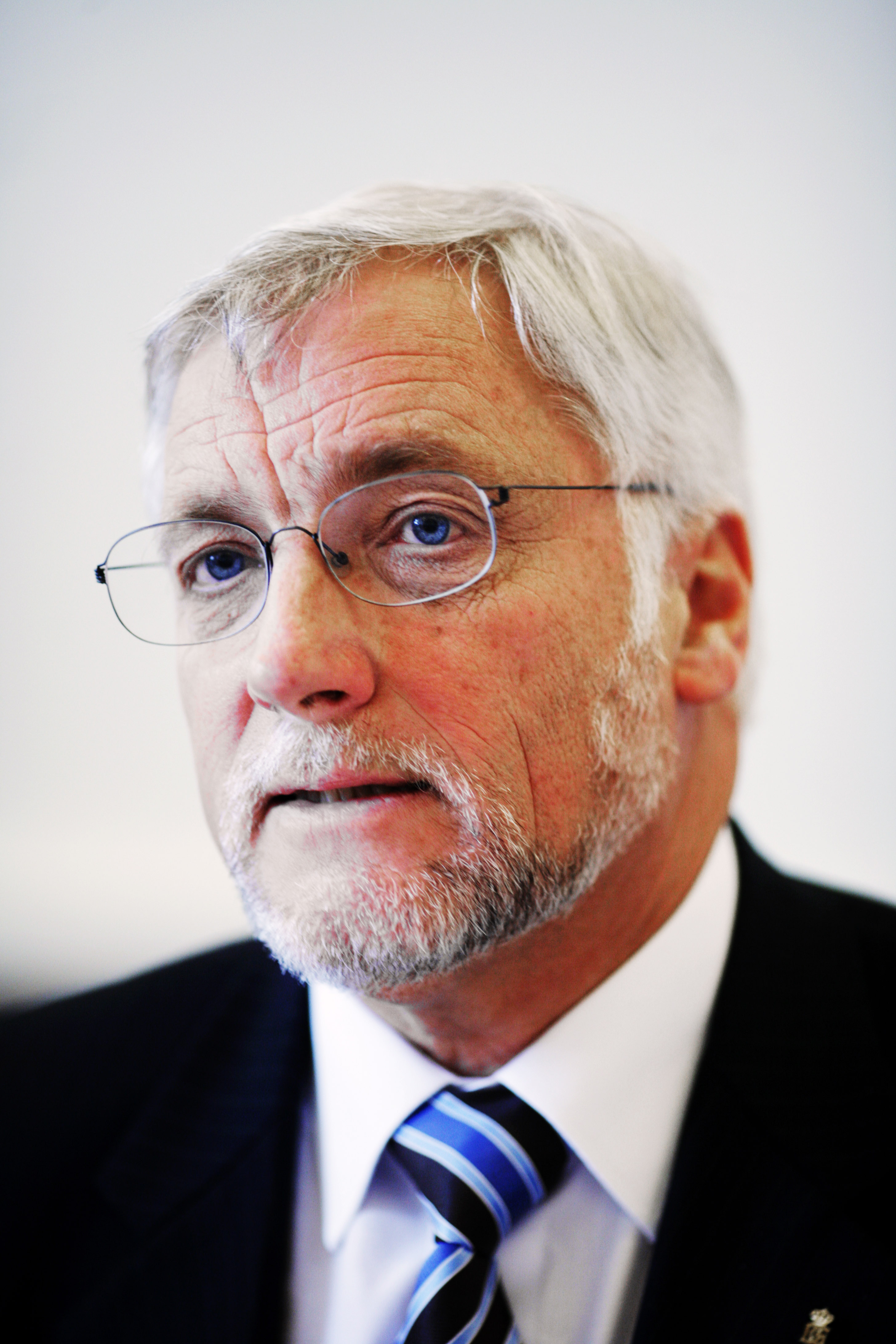
- Pedersen in 2006

Speaker of the Folketing
- In office 28 November 2007 – 15 September 2011
- Monarch: Margrethe II
- Preceded by: Christian Mejdahl
- Succeeded by: Mogens Lykketoft

Minister of Finance
- In office 27 November 2001 – 23 November 2007
- Prime Minister: Anders Fogh Rasmussen
- Preceded by: Pia Gjellerup
- Succeeded by: Lars Løkke Rasmussen

Personal details
- Born: 14 June 1945 (age 81) Gentofte, Denmark
- Party: Venstre
- Education: University of Copenhagen

Thor Pedersen (born 14 June 1945) is former member of Folketinget. He was representing the Liberal party, Venstre. He was Finance Minister from 27 November 2001 to 23 November 2007 as part of the Cabinets of Anders Fogh Rasmussen I and II. He was a Member of Parliament (Folketinget) from 1985 to 2011 and served as Speaker from 28 November 2007 until 15 September 2011.

He was Minister of Housing from 12 March 1986 to 9 September 1987, Minister of the Interior from 10 September 1987 to 25 January 1993, Minister for Nordic Cooperation from 3 June 1988 to 18 November 1992 and Minister of Economic Affairs from 19 November 1992 to 25 January 1993.

He was a member of Helsinge Municipal Council from 1974 to 1986, where he was also mayor from 1978 to 1986.

== Education ==
Matriculated in mathematics, Frederiksborg State Upper Secondary School, 1964

Sergeant in the Royal Danish Life Guards, 1964–1966

Master of Science in Economics, University of Copenhagen, 1978

== Other work ==
Thor Pedersen has worked extensively in private business, both in investment companies and as a board member of several Danish companies.

Political offices
Preceded by Niels Bollmann	Minister of Housing; 1986–1987	Succeeded by Flemming Kofod-Svendsen
Preceded by Knud Enggaard	Minister of the Interior; 1987–1993	Succeeded by Birte Weiss
Preceded by Anders Fogh Rasmussen	Minister of Economic Affairs; 1992–1993	Succeeded by Marianne Jelved
Preceded by Pia Gjellerup	Minister of Finance; 2001–2007	Succeeded by Lars Løkke Rasmussen
Preceded by Christian Mejdahl	Speaker of the Folketing; 2007–2011	Succeeded by Mogens Lykketoft
