= Demokraten (1873) =

Defunct weekly newspaper in Denmark (1873)

Demokraten (meaning The Democrat in English) was a weekly newspaper published from Copenhagen between 6 January and 29 December 1873. It was edited by C. Würtz and W. Rasmussen.
