= Frode Sørensen (politician) =

Danish politician

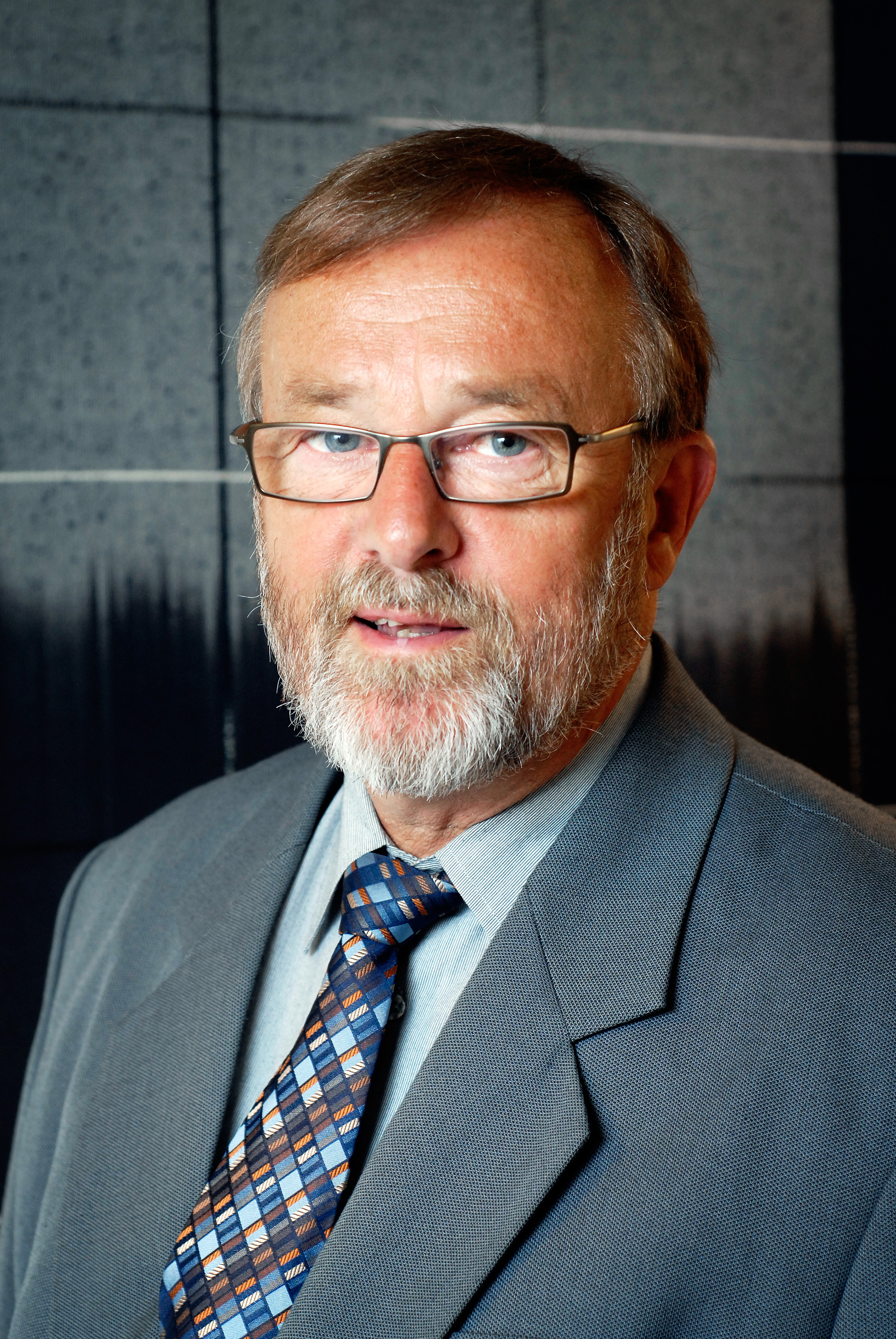

Frode Sørensen (born 21 January 1946 at Toftlund) was a member of the Danish parliament representing the Social Democrats. He was Tax Minister from 21 December 2000 to 27 November 2001. He was a Member of Parliament (Folketinget) from 11 March 1998 - 13 November 2007.

Political offices
Preceded by Ole Stavad	Tax Minister of Denmark; 21 December 2000 – 27 November 2001	Succeeded by Svend Erik Hovmand
