= Torben Lund =

Danish politician (born 1950)

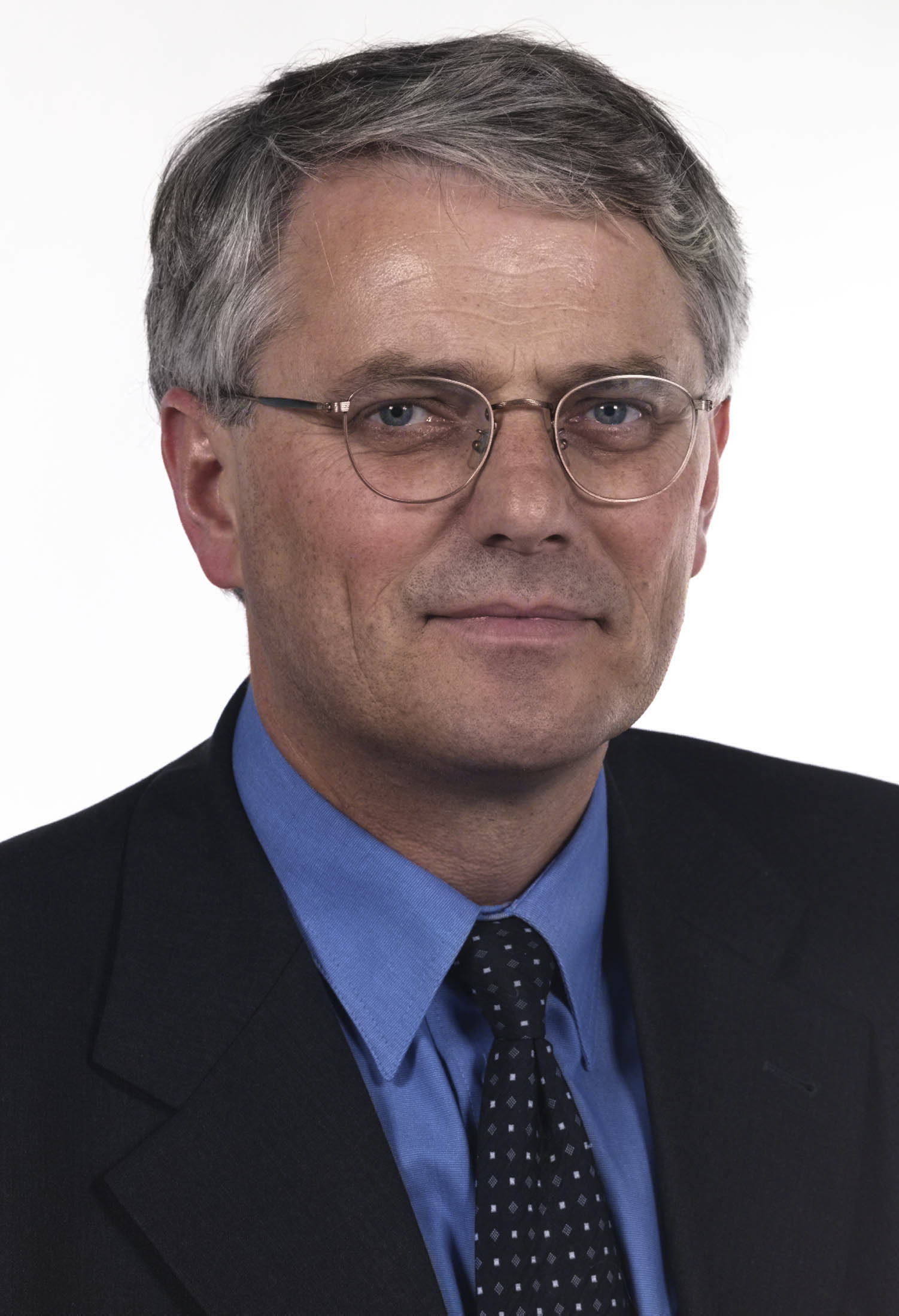
- Lund in 1999

Member of the Folketing
- In office 1981–1998

Member of the European Parliament for Denmark
- In office 1999–2004

Personal details
- Born: 6 November 1950 (age 75) Vejle, Denmark
- Spouse: Claus Lautrup

Torben Lund (born 6 November 1950) is a Danish politician, who served in the Folketing from 1981 to 1998 and in the European Parliament from 1999 to 2004. He was associated with the Danish Social Democrats in Denmark, and the Progressive Alliance of Socialists and Democrats in the European Parliament.

While sitting in the Folketing, he was one of the sponsors of the 1989 legislation that first legalized registered partnership for same-sex couples. He served as Health Minister in the Poul Nyrup Rasmussen I Cabinet from 1993 to 1994.

He came out as gay in 1998, becoming Denmark's first openly gay member of the Folketing. In 1999, he married his partner Claus Lautrup.

After his retirement from politics, he joined the Danish television network Dk4. He remained active in the Social Democrats, but left the party in 2009 due to disagreements with the leadership of Helle Thorning-Schmidt.
