= Anita Bay Bundegaard =

Danish politician (born 1963)

Anita Bay Bundegaard (born 31 October 1963, in Tejn) is a former politician for the Danish Social Liberal Party. Between 1998 and 2000, she served as editor for the newspaper Politiken, before going on to serve as the Minister for Development Assistance in the Cabinet of Poul Nyrup Rasmussen IV from 2000 to 2001. As of 2013, she served as director of Save the Children in Geneva.

== Biography ==
Anita Bay Bundegaard was born in Tejn and graduated from Rønne State School in 1983. She subsequently studied English and Spanish at the University of Copenhagen and the Copenhagen Business School. She has worked in journalism as a program staff member at DR-Rønne from 1994 to 1996, as editor of Højskolebladet from 1996 to 1998, and as a debate editor at Politiken from 1998 to 2000.

Having joined the Danish Social Liberal Party (Det Radikale Venstre) as a young adult, she served as a student assistant for Bernhard Baunsgaard and Marianne Jelved. She stood as a candidate for the party in 1994 in the Ballerup constituency and in 1998 in the Bornholm constituency. Additionally, she was a candidate in the 1994 European Parliament elections. Although she was not elected and remained politically unknown, she was appointed Minister for Development Cooperation in the Poul Nyrup Rasmussen IV Cabinet during a government reshuffle on 21 December 2000. She held this post until the government resigned on 27 November 2001. Bundegaard caused a significant stir during a period of intense debate regarding immigration.

In a February 2001 interview with Weekendavisen, she called for Western countries to find better ways to handle "poverty refugees," suggesting they should be eligible for asylum in Denmark. Her statement was promptly disavowed by then-Prime Minister Poul Nyrup Rasmussen and the Social Liberal Party leadership. Despite the controversy, she received the Nairobi Prize in 2001 from development journalists for her efforts in her ministerial role. Following her time in government, Bundegaard became an advisor to the UNHCR in Geneva.

On 1 March 2006, she returned to Politiken as the editor of the editorial board. On 30 September 2008, she was appointed culture editor for the same newspaper. Anita Bay Bundegaard is married to the journalist and author Christian Bundegaard. In addition to her professional roles, she has translated several books, including (together with her husband) The Red Notebook and Other True Stories by Paul Auster.
