= Carsten Koch (politician) =

Danish economist and politician

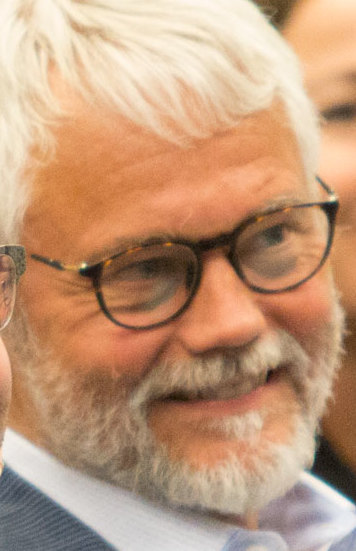
Nordic conference on the integration of refugees into working life.

Carsten Johan Koch (born April 27, 1945) is a Danish economist and former Social Democratic politician and minister.

He was born in Kongens Lyngby, Denmark, to tailor Robert Koch and Elly J. Koch.

He graduated from Lyngby State School in 1964 and received a cand.polit. from the University of Copenhagen in 1971.

From 1973 to 1975 he was a graduate student in the Department of Economics of the University of Copenhagen, and in 1975 he became an assistant professor and then from 1978 to 1982 an associate professor there.

From 1982 to 1993, he was an economist with the Arbejderbevægelsens Erhvervsråd (Economic Council of the Labour Movement). In 1993 he became head of the department, in 1994 the director, and later in 1994 the treasurer.

Koch was the director of Danske Bank from 1 September 2000 until 2008, when he became chairman of the Skattekommissionen (Danish Tax Commission).

In 2009, Carsten Koch was appointed CEO of LD (now LD Pensions) on a two-year contract.

In 2010, he was appointed president of the Beskæftigelsesrådet (Employment Council).

In 2014, he was chairman of the Expert Committee on Active Employment Efforts (the Carsten Koch Committee).

== Political career ==
- Tax Minister in the Poul Nyrup Rasmussen II Cabinet from 1 November 1994 to 30 December 1996
- Tax Minister in the Poul Nyrup Rasmussen III Cabinet from 30 December 1996 to 23 March 1998
- Minister of Health in the Poul Nyrup Rasmussen IV Cabinet from 23 March 1998 to 23 February 2000
- Member of the Folketing for Frederiksborg County Council from 11 March 1998 to 31 August 2000
