= Jytte Hilden =

Danish politician (born 1942)

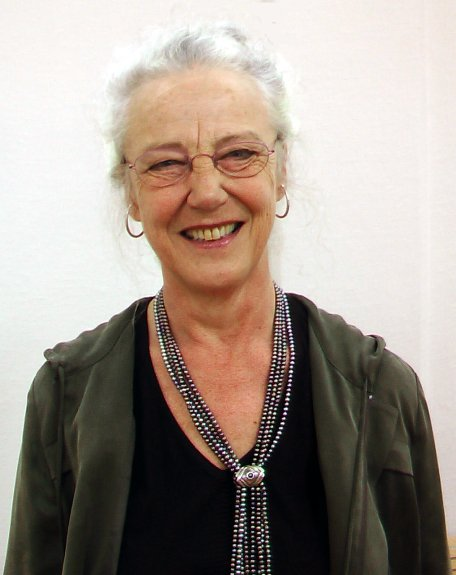

Minister for Culture
- In office 25 January 1993 – 30 December 1996
- Prime Minister: Poul Nyrup Rasmussen
- Preceded by: Grethe Rostbøll
- Succeeded by: Ebbe Lundgaard

Minister for Higher Education and Science
- In office 30 December 1996 – 23 March 1998
- Prime Minister: Poul Nyrup Rasmussen
- Preceded by: Frank Jensen
- Succeeded by: Jan Trøjborg

Member of the Folketing
- In office 1979–1998

Personal details
- Born: 12 September 1942 (age 84) Copenhagen, Denmark
- Party: Social Democrats
- Education: Danmarks Tekniske Højskole

Jytte Hilden (born 12 September 1942) is a Danish chemical engineer and politician (Social Democrats). She was elected member of the Folketing from 1979 to 1998, and was appointed Minister for Culture in Poul Nyrup Rasmussen's first Cabinet.
