= Yvonne Herløv Andersen =

Danish politician (born 1942)

Yvonne Herløv Andersen (born 1942) is a Danish former politician. She left parliament in 2001.

A social worker and school principal by profession, Herløv Andersen was present at the founding of the Centre Democrats in 1973, though initially in a background role, serving as assistant to party leader Erhard Jakobsen, and in other internal party positions. She was elected to the Folketing (Danish parliament) in 1977 from Sorø, serving until 1979, again from 1981 to 1984 from Slagelse, and from 1987 to 1988 from Odense. In 1994 she was appointed Social Minister in the first Nyrup Rasmussen cabinet. She subsequently served as Minister of Health in the second Nyrup Rasmussen cabinet, from 1994 to 1996, where she focused particularly on reform of HIV policy, and compensation for previous mistreatment of hemophiliacs.

She was outed as a lesbian in 1996 by Palle Juul-Jensen, the former head of the National Board of Health, who had clashed with Herløv Anderson and her predecessor Torben Lund over AIDS policy, leading to Juul-Jensen's forced resignation in 1995. In his memoir, Juul-Jensen asked what would have been different if "the two latest Ministers of Health, not only politically but personally, had another relationship to the National Union for Gays and Lesbians". Herløv Anderson and Lund thereafter acknowledged their sexual orientations, becoming the first openly gay members of the Danish parliament.

She married a man named Arne Knood Andersen in 1963 and divorced him in 1968, she has two children with him. She entered into a registered partnership with her partner Birthe Merete Smedegaard Knudsen since 1990, they married later.
