= Pia Gjellerup =

Danish politician

Pia Gjellerup (born 22 August 1959) is a Danish politician representing the Social Democrats. She has been a Member of Parliament (Folketinget) since 8 September 1987 and has occupied three different cabinet positions: Justice Minister (25 January 1993 – 29 March 1993), Minister of Trade and Industry (23 March 1998 – 23 December 2000), and Finance Minister (21 December 2000 – 27 November 2001).

She is a solicitor by profession.

Political offices
Preceded by Hans Engell	Justice Minister of Denmark; 25 January 1993 – 29 March 1993	Succeeded by Erling Olsen
Preceded by Jan Trøjborg	Minister of Trade and Industry; 23 March 1998 – 29 December 2000	Succeeded by Ole Stavad
Preceded by Mogens Lykketoft	Finance Minister of Denmark; 21 December 2000 – 27 November 2001	Succeeded by Thor Pedersen
