= Helle Degn =

Danish politician

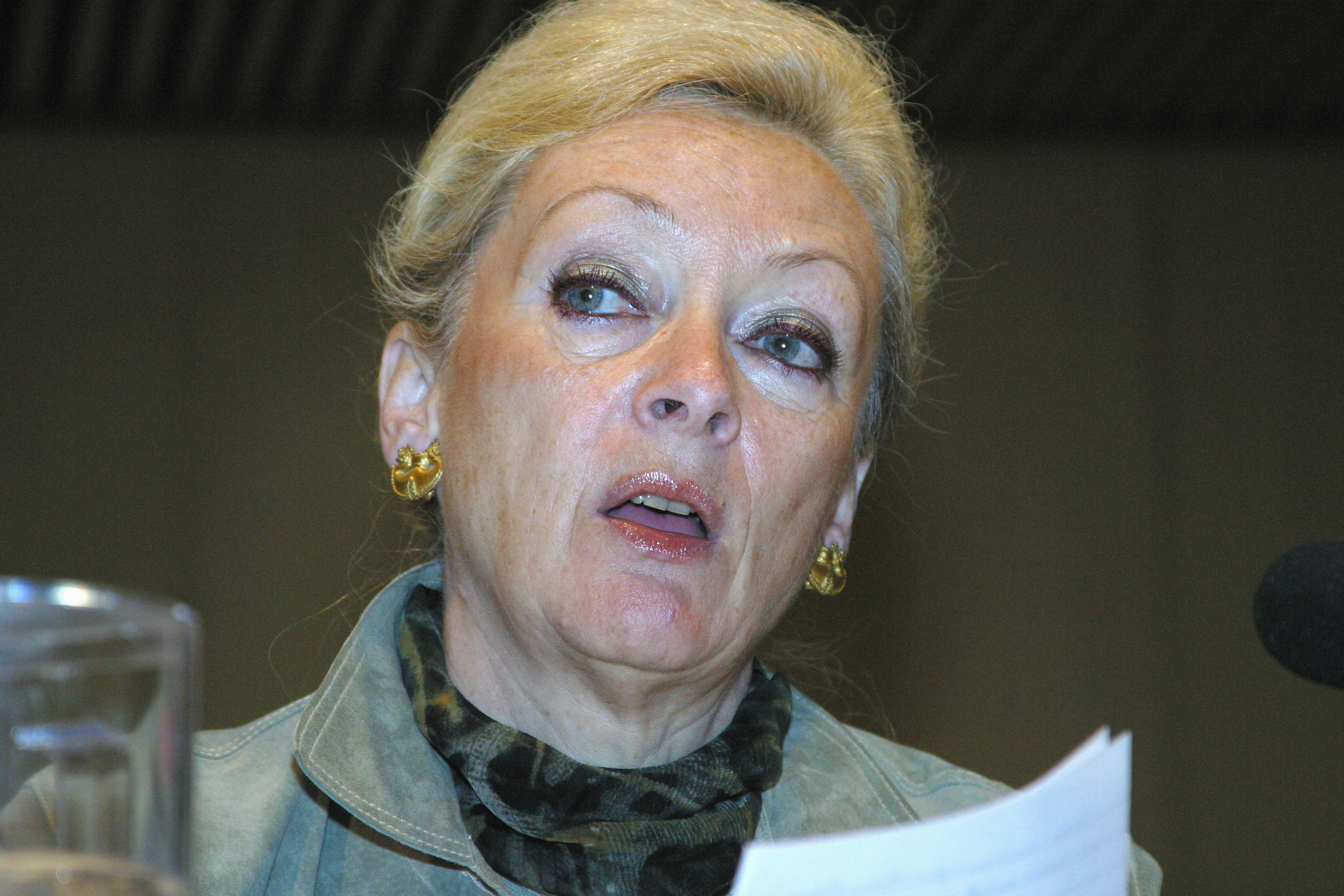

Member of Parliament
- In office 1971–1975
- In office 1977–2000

Personal details
- Born: 20 October 1946 (age 79) Copenhagen, Denmark
- Party: Social Democrats

Helle Degn (born 20 October 1946 in Copenhagen) is a Danish politician. She is a member of the Danish Social Democrats and chairman of Mandela Center, Denmark. In 2000 she was made a Commander of the Order of the Dannebrog by Queen Margrethe II.

== Career ==
- 1969–1971 Member of the Tårnby Municipal Council
- 1971–1975 Member of Parliament (Folketinget)
- 1977–2000 Member of Parliament (Folketinget)
- 1977–1993, 1994–2000 Member of the Danish Board of the Inter-Parliamentary Union
- 1997, 1980, 1985, 1995 and 2000 Member of the Danish delegation to the UN World Conference on Women
- 1982–1987 Chairperson of the Equal Status Commission under the Prime Ministers Office
- 1993–1994 Minister of Development Cooperation
- 1993 Head of delegation of the UN Conference on Human Rights
- 1994 Head of Delegation at the UN Conference on Population in Cairo
- 1993–1999 Socialist International Women (SIW) (vice-president)
- 1994–1998 vice-president of Organization for Security and Co-operation in Europe - Parliamentary Assembly, and Chairperson of the OSCE Socialist Group
- 1994–2000
  - Chairman of the Foreign Policy Committee of Parliament (Folketinget)
  - Chairman of the Danish delegation to the OSCE-PA
  - Member of the Danish delegation to the Council of Europe
  - Chairperson of the Committee on Economic Affairs and Development, Council of Europe
  - Member of the Finance Committee of Parliament (Folketinget)
  - Vice-president of the Socialist International Women
  - Spokesperson for the Social Democrats on Foreign and Security Policy
  - Chairperson of the UN Parliamentary Group of Parliament (Folketinget)
- 1997–2000 Chairman of P.D. Burma
- 1998–1999 President of OSCE - Parliamentary Assembly
- 1999–2000 President of OSCE - Parliamentary Assembly. (2nd term)
- 2000–2004 Commissioner of the Council of the Baltic Sea States on Democratic Development
- 2004 Member of the board of Rehabiliterings centret for etniske kvinder i Danmark (RED) ("Rehabilitation Centre for ethnic women in Denmark")
- 2005 Member of Presidium of the International Club of Copenhagen. ICC
- 2005–2008 President of Rehabiliterings centret for etniske kvinder i Danmark. (RED)
- 2006 Member of Social Economics think-tank
- 2006 Appointed Ambassador for Dansk Folkehjælp ("Danish People's Aid")
- 2008 Chairman of Mandela Center, Denmark
