= Ole Stavad =

Danish politician

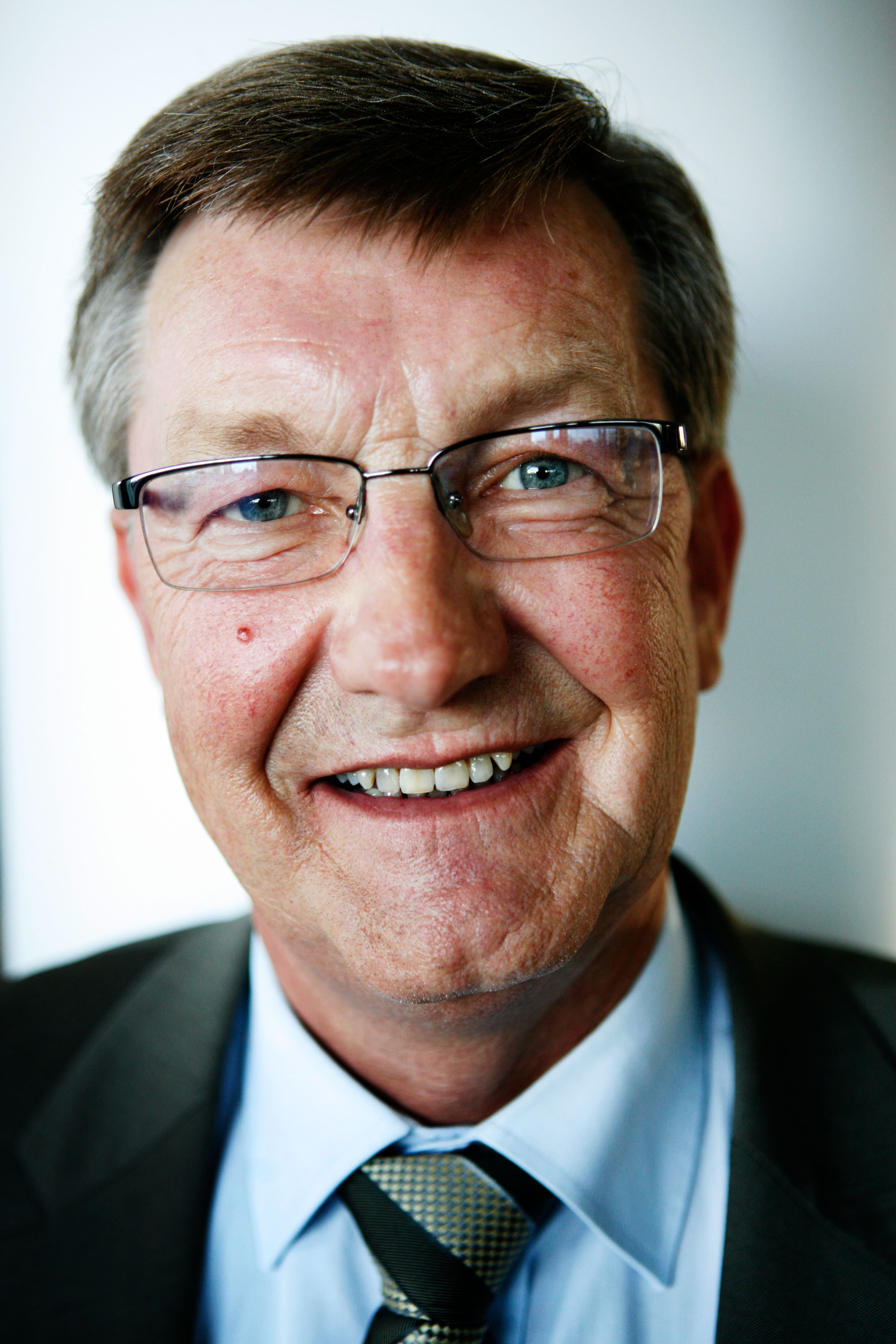
Ole Stavad

Ole Stavad (born 1 June 1949, in Ejersted) is a Danish politician representing the Social Democrats.

Stavad was a member of the Danish Parliament from 1980 to 2007.

Stavad served as Tax Minister between 1993–1994 and 1998–2001 and as Minister of Trade and Industry 2000–2001. He was Deputy Chairman of the Danish Social Democratic Party between 1995 and 2000. He served as President of the Nordic Council in 2006.

Political offices
Preceded by Peter Brixtofte	Tax Minister of Denmark; 25 January 1993 – 1 November 1994	Succeeded by Carsten Koch
Preceded by Carsten Koch	Tax Minister of Denmark; 23 March 1998 – 21 December 2000	Succeeded by Frode Sørensen
Preceded by Pia Gjellerup	Minister of Trade and Industry; 21 December 2000 – 21 November 2001	Succeeded by Bendt Bendtsen
