= Jan Trøjborg =

Danish politician

- Born: 14 December 1955; Horsens, Denmark
- Died: 6 May 2012 (aged 56); Aarhus, Denmark
- Occupation: politician

Jan Trøjborg (14 December 1955 – 6 May 2012) was a Danish politician representing the Social Democrats.

He was a member of parliament (Folketinget) from 8 September 1987 to 31 December 2005. In November 2005 he was elected Mayor of Horsens. At the time of his death, he was the chairman of Kommunernes Landsforening. He died of a heart attack while riding a bicycle in a cycling race. His demise occurred the day before a Giro d'Italia stage was taking place in his city. Trøjborg had been a key factor in bringing the 2012 Giro to Denmark.

== Ministers posts ==
- Minister of Industry from 25 January 1993 to 28 January 1994
- Minister of Traffic from 28 January 1994 to 30 December 1996
- Minister of Business and Industry from 30 December 1996 to 23 March 1998
- Minister of Research from 23 March 1998 to 10 July 1999
- Minister for Development Cooperation from 10 July 1999 to 21 December 2000
- Minister of Defence from 21 December 2000 to 27 November 2001.

Political offices
Preceded by Poul Nielson	Minister for Development Cooperation; 10 July 1999 – 21 December 2000	Succeeded by Anita Bay Bundegaard
Preceded by Hans Hækkerup	Defence Minister of Denmark; 21 December 2000 – 27 November 2001	Succeeded by Svend Aage Jensby
