= Poul Nyrup Rasmussen =

Prime Minister of Denmark from 1993 to 2001

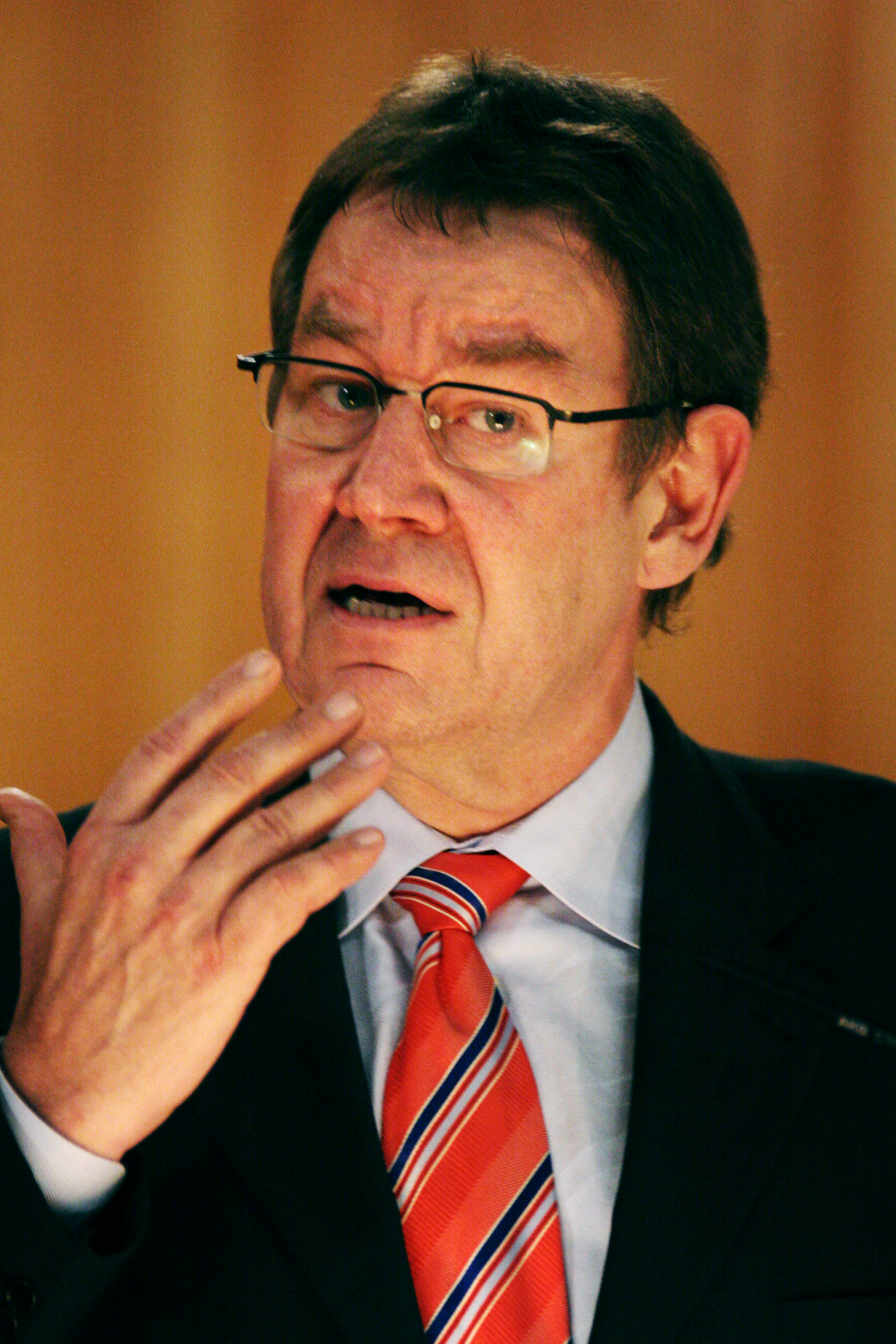
- Rasmussen in 2004

Prime Minister of Denmark
- In office 25 January 1993 – 27 November 2001
- Monarch: Margrethe II
- Preceded by: Poul Schlüter
- Succeeded by: Anders Fogh Rasmussen

President of the European Socialists
- In office 24 July 2004 – 24 November 2011
- Preceded by: Robin Cook
- Succeeded by: Sergei Stanishev

Leader of the Social Democrats
- In office 3 September 1992 – 14 December 2002
- Preceded by: Svend Auken
- Succeeded by: Mogens Lykketoft

Member of the European Parliament
- In office 3 September 2004 – 9 October 2009
- Constituency: Denmark

Member of the Folketing
- In office 10 May 1988 – 12 September 2004
- Constituency: Ringkøbing County

Personal details
- Born: 15 June 1943 (age 83) Esbjerg, Denmark
- Party: Social Democrats
- Spouse: Lone Dybkjær (m. 1994; died 2020)
- Children: Signe
- Parent(s): Oluf Nyrup Rasmussen; Vera Eline Nyrup Rasmussen
- Education: University of Copenhagen

Poul Oluf Nyrup Rasmussen (Danish pronunciation: [ˈpʰʌwl ˈnyˀɔp ˈʁɑsmusn̩], informally Poul Nyrup, born 15 June 1943) is a retired Danish politician, who served as Prime Minister of Denmark from 25 January 1993 to 27 November 2001 and President of the Party of European Socialists (PES) from 2004 to 2011. He was the leader of the governing Social Democrats from 1992 to 2002 and was also a member of the European Parliament from 2004 to 2009.

Rasmussen is a member of the Club of Madrid. In 2007 he published the book I grådighedens tid (In a Time of Greed), which contains harsh criticism of the role hedge and venture capital funds play in the global economy.

== Early life ==
Rasmussen was born to a working-class family on 15 June 1943 in Esbjerg, Denmark, to Oluf and Vera Eline Nyrup Rasmussen. He studied at the University of Copenhagen, earning a M.sc. degree in economics in 1971. While studying, he was active in the social democratic student union Frit Forum, where he met some of his future political colleagues. He paid his way through university by doing several jobs, like counting traffic and being a part-time delivery boy.

== Political career ==
=== Member of the Folketing 1987–1993 ===
He was first elected to the Folketing from Western Jutland in 1987, where he became Deputy Chairman of the Social Democrats, with Svend Auken as chairman. He had together with Mogens Lykketoft made proposals for Social Democratic reforms. From 1988 to 1992 he was chairman of the Committee on Business and Trade, as well as spokesperson of Business. After the 1990 election, he was seen as a much more realistic candidate for Prime Minister than Auken.

In 1992 Rasmussen replaced Auken, the long serving leader of the Social Democrats, after his failure to form a government with the Radikale Venstre after the 1990 election, despite good results for both parties. Many in the party felt that Auken had stuck to a too left wing agenda, scuttling a possible deal with the more centrist Radikale Venstre.

=== Prime Minister 1993–2001 ===
Rasmussen came to power in early 1993 when then-Prime Minister Poul Schlüter resigned after an inquiry found that he had misinformed the Folketing about the so-called Tamil Case. A coalition of Social Democrats, Social Liberals, Centre Democrats and Christian Democrats, Rasmussen's first cabinet made use of limited classical Keynesianism in connection with the so-called kick-start of 1993–94 as its economic policy. The Christian Democrats left the coalition after their defeat in the 1994 Folketing election, as did the Centre Democrats in late 1996. Key ministers were Economy and Deputy Prime Minister, Social Liberal leader Marianne Jelved, Finance Minister Mogens Lykketoft (Social Democrats) and Foreign Minister Niels Helveg Petersen (Social Liberals).

The centre-left coalition only narrowly held on to its parliamentary majority in the 1998 Folketing election. After the election Prime Minister Rasmussen stated that the government's first order of business was to secure a "yes" vote in the upcoming referendum on ratification of the Amsterdam Treaty between the member states of the European Union. Eventually there were 55% "yes" votes in the Danish Amsterdam Treaty referendum. Rasmussen's government later presided over the 2000 referendum on Danish participation in the euro, in which participation was rejected by 53.2% of the vote. A 1998 initiative, dubbed the Whitsun Packet (Danish: Pinsepakken) from the season it was issued, increased taxes, limiting private consumption. It was not universally popular with the electorate, which may have been a factor in the Social Democrats' defeat in the 2001 parliamentary election.

Rasmussen called an early election in 2001, saying this would give the next prime minister time to prepare for Denmark's upcoming presidency of the European Union in 2002. The patriarchal role Rasmussen had built for himself since the 11 September attacks had gained him and the Social Liberals their highest poll ratings in years, a lead that would be eroded in the buildup to the election.

He was up against Liberal leader Anders Fogh Rasmussen. The campaign focused mainly on immigration and refugees, which worked to the benefit of the anti-immigration Danish People's Party. Two in every three Danes now supported tighter immigration restrictions, compared to only one in two before 11 September. In the last few days of the campaign a number of predominantly left-leaning artists and intellectuals urged the Danish electorate not to vote for a rightwing government, warning that the Danish People's Party would then be likely to wield great influence on government policy.

Other campaign focuses were on welfare and health care. Poul Nyrup Rasmussen stated the aim of creating a more robust economy to deal with the economic downturn. There was little debate about the European Union as the two leaders' opinions on that subject were largely the same. The loss of power in the 2001 election to Anders Fogh Rasmussen's Venstre meant that the Social Democrats lost their position as the largest party in the Folketing, a position they had held without interruption since the 1924 Folketing election. On election night Rasmussen vowed to stay on as party leader, famously declaring, "I will not run away with my tail between my legs." He announced an effort of "renewal" within the Social Democrats, urging the promotion of centrist party members to leadership positions. Influential factions opposed Rasmussen's efforts, calling his leadership into question, and in late 2002 he announced that he would be stepping down as chairman.

=== European Parliament, 2004 ===
Rasmussen became an MEP for the Party of European Socialists after winning a record number of 407,966 votes for an individual (from Denmark) in the European Parliamentary elections in 2004. He sat on both the Foreign Affairs Committee and the Economic and Monetary Affairs Committee.

A key issue tackled by Rasmussen in the European Parliament was the lack of regulation for private equity and hedge funds. He worked to secure greater regulation in this area, starting long before the onset of the 2008 financial crisis. His report, proposing binding rules for all players as well as greater transparency and accountability, was passed by the European Parliament in September 2008. Rasmussen has since criticised the European Commission, and in particular Commission President José Manuel Durão Barroso and Commissioner Charlie McCreevy for failing to respond to the report with sufficient speed or dedication.

Rasmussen has also slammed the commission's response to the economic crisis; in March 2009 he wrote: "A new, updated Recovery Plan is needed now, otherwise there will be 25 million unemployed in 2010. There must be real coordination focused on real investments. Europe also needs to do more for the countries of Central and Eastern Europe. It is in our common economic and political interest to prevent financial meltdown in those countries. Europe talks a lot about solidarity, now is the time it is really needed."

=== Party of European Socialists, 2004–2011 ===
In 2004 Rasmussen defeated Giuliano Amato to be elected President of the PES, succeeding Robin Cook in the post. He was re-elected for a further two-and-a-half years at the PES Congress in Porto on 8 December 2006. The position involved coordinating the political vision of the party, ensuring unity, chairing the party presidency and representing the party on a regular basis. As PES president he was also President of the Global Progressive Forum and sat on the committee of Transatlantic Dialogue, which fosters cooperation between progressives from the United States and Europe. Rasmussen played a central role in making the party more inclusive and oversaw the launch of the network 'PES Activists', as well as a radically participative consultation process to construct the party's manifesto for the 2009 European election.

Rasmussen's influence in politicising the PES can be seen in the party's headline political initiative, New Social Europe. Based on a report written by Rasmussen and former President of the European Commission Jacques Delors, this aimed at creating a "fairer, more inclusive, and more dynamic society". Currently, he is on the advisory board of OMFIF where he is regularly involved in meetings regarding the financial and monetary system.

== Personal life ==
In 1994, Rasmussen married Lone Dybkjær, a member of Folketing (and a former MEP) for the centrist Det Radikale Venstre. He enjoyed holidaying with his wife in their second house as well as swimming, walking, and reflecting with friends. He also likes listening to music. His daughter, Signe died by suicide in 1993. His wife, Lone died of breast cancer on 20 July 2020, at the age of 80.

He is not related to his two immediate successors from Venstre (i.e., a main Danish centre-right, liberal party) as Prime Minister, namely Anders Fogh Rasmussen or Lars Løkke Rasmussen.

== Timeline ==
Party political offices
| Preceded by Svend Auken | Leader of the Social Democrats; 1992–2002 | Succeeded by Mogens Lykketoft |
| Preceded by Robin Cook | President of the Party of European Socialists; 2004–2011 | Succeeded by Sergei Stanishev |
Political offices
| Preceded by Poul Schlüter | Prime Minister of Denmark; 1993–2001 | Succeeded by Anders Fogh Rasmussen |
