= Minister of Health (Denmark) =

Danish cabinet position

- Sundhedsminister
- State coat of arms of the Kingdom of Denmark

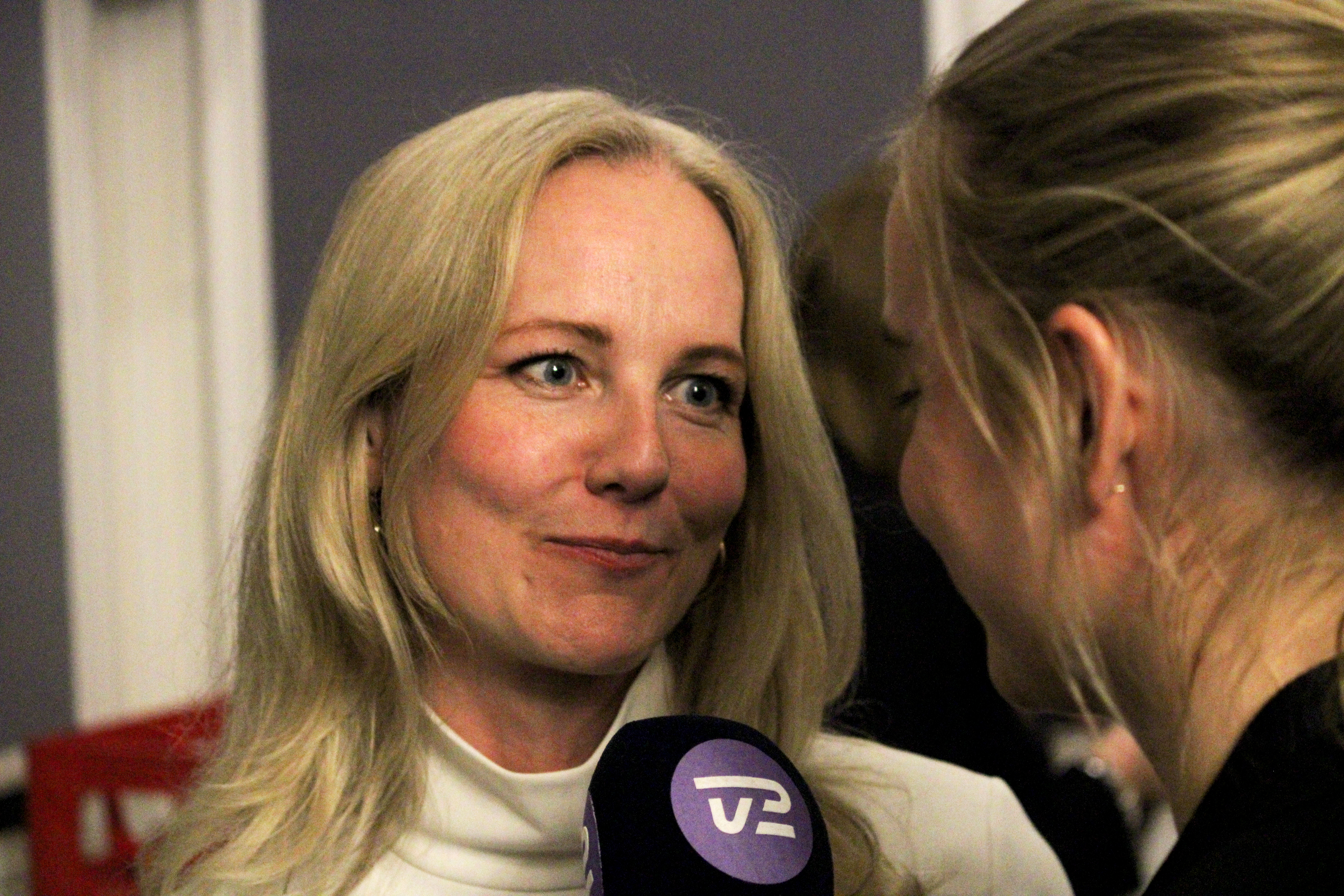
- Incumbent; Ida Auken since 3 June 2026
- Ministry of Health
- Type: Minister
- Member of: Cabinet; State Council
- Reports to: the Prime minister
- Seat: Slotsholmen
- Nominator: the Prime minister
- Appointer: The Monarch (on the advice of the Prime Minister)
- Formation: 14 December 1926; 99 years ago
- First holder: Viktor Rubow
- Succession: depending on the order in the State Council
- Deputy: Permanent Secretary
- Salary: 1.624.503,02 DKK (€217,931), in 2026

The Danish Minister of Health (Danish: Sundhedsminister), is a minister in the government of Denmark, with overall responsibility for strategy and policy across the Ministry of Health.

== List of ministers ==
| No. | Portrait | Name (born-died) | Term of office | | | Political party | Government | Ref. |
| No. | Portrait | Name (born-died) | Took office | Left office | Time in office | Political party | Government | Ref. |
Minister of Health Services (Minister for Sundhedsvæsenet)
| 1 | | Viktor Rubow (1871–1929) | 14 December 1926 | 30 April 1929 | 2 years, 137 days | Venstre | Madsen-Mygdal | |
Minister of Building and Health Services (Minister for byggeri og sundhedsvæsen)
| 2 | | Johannes Kjærbøl (1885–1973) | 13 November 1947 | 23 November 1947 | 10 days | Social Democrats | Hedtoft I | |
Minister of Health (Sundhedsminister)
| 3 | | Agnete Laustsen (1935–2018) | 10 September 1987 | 3 June 1988 | 267 days | Conservative People's Party | Schlüter II | |
| 4 | | Elsebeth Kock-Petersen (born 1949) | 3 June 1988 | 7 December 1989 | 1 year, 187 days | Venstre | Schlüter III | |
| 5 | | Ester Larsen (1936–2025) | 7 December 1989 | 25 January 1993 | 3 years, 49 days | Venstre | Schlüter III–IV | |
| 6 | | Torben Lund (born 1950) | 25 January 1993 | 27 September 1994 | 1 year, 245 days | Social Democrats | P. N. Rasmussen I | |
| 7 | | Yvonne Herløv Andersen (born 1942) | 27 September 1994 | 30 December 1996 | 2 years, 94 days | Centre Democrats | P. N. Rasmussen II | |
| 8 | | Birte Weiss (1941–2026) | 30 December 1996 | 23 March 1998 | 1 year, 83 days | Social Democrats | P. N. Rasmussen III | |
| 9 | | Carsten Koch (born 1945) | 23 March 1998 | 23 February 2000 | 1 year, 337 days | Social Democrats | P. N. Rasmussen IV | |
| 10 | | Sonja Mikkelsen (born 1955) | 23 February 2000 | 21 December 2000 | 302 days | Social Democrats | P. N. Rasmussen IV | |
| 11 | | Arne Rolighed (born 1947) | 21 December 2000 | 27 November 2001 | 341 days | Social Democrats | P. N. Rasmussen IV | |
Minister of the Interior and Health (Indenrigs- og sundhedsminister)
| 12 | | Lars Løkke Rasmussen (born 1964) | 27 November 2001 | 23 November 2007 | 5 years, 361 days | Venstre | A. F. Rasmussen I–II | |
Minister of Health and Prevention (Minister for sundhed og forebyggelse)
| 13 | | Jakob Axel Nielsen (born 1967) | 23 November 2007 | 23 February 2010 | 2 years, 92 days | Conservative People's Party | A. F. Rasmussen III; L. L. Rasmussen I | |
Minister of the Interior and Health (Indenrigs- og sundhedsminister)
| 14 | | Bertel Haarder (born 1944) | 23 February 2010 | 3 October 2011 | 1 year, 222 days | Venstre | L. L. Rasmussen I | |
Minister of Health and Prevention (Minister for sundhed og forebyggelse)
| 15 | | Astrid Krag (born 1982) | 3 October 2011 | 30 January 2014 | 2 years, 119 days | Socialist People's Party | Thorning-Schmidt I | |
| 16 | | Nick Hækkerup (born 1968) | 3 February 2014 | 28 June 2015 | 1 year, 145 days | Social Democrats | Thorning-Schmidt II | |
Minister of Health and Elderly Affairs (Sundheds- og ældreminister)
| 17 | | Sophie Løhde (born 1983) | 28 June 2015 | 28 November 2016 | 1 year, 153 days | Venstre | L. L. Rasmussen II | |
Minister of Health (Sundhedsminister)
| 18 | | Ellen Trane Nørby (born 1980) | 28 November 2016 | 27 June 2019 | 2 years, 211 days | Venstre | L. L. Rasmussen III | |
Minister of Health and Elderly Affairs (Sundheds- og ældreminister)
| 19 | | Magnus Heunicke (born 1975) | 27 June 2019 | 15 December 2022 | 3 years, 171 days | Social Democrats | Frederiksen I | |
Minister of the Interior and Health (Indenrigs- og sundhedsminister)
| (17) | | Sophie Løhde (born 1983) | 15 December 2022 | 3 June 2026 | 3 years, 266 days | Venstre | Frederiksen II | |
Minister of Health (Sundhedsminister)
| 20 | | Ida Auken (born 1978) | 3 June 2026 | Incumbent | 96 days | Social Democrats | Frederiksen III | |
