= Minister for Children (Denmark) =

Danish cabinet position

Minister of Children
- Børneminister
- State coat of arms of the Kingdom of Denmark

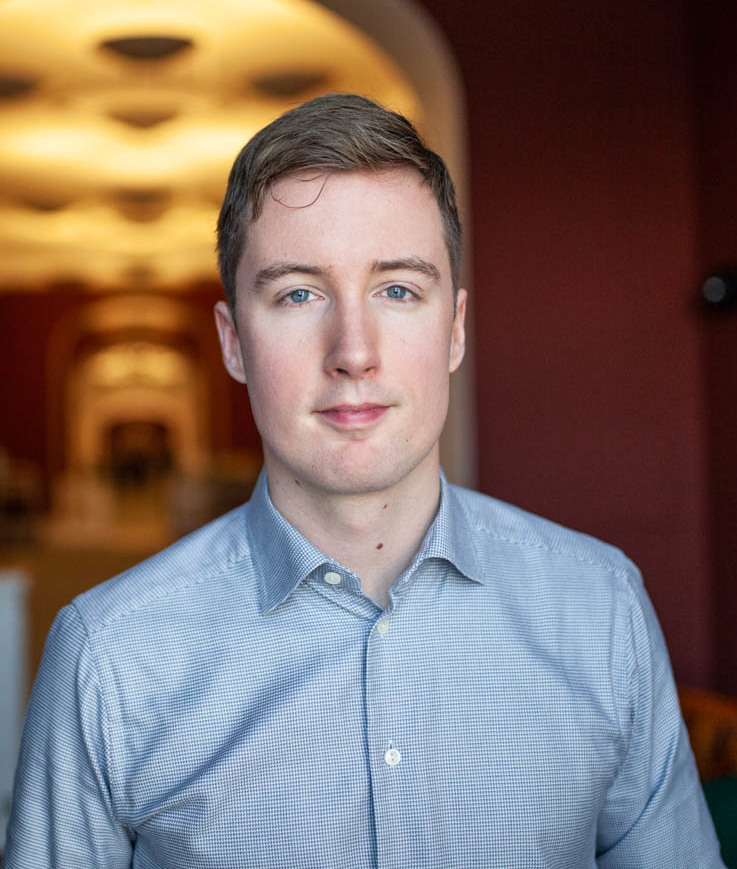
- Incumbent; Jacob Mark since 3 June 2026
- Ministry of Education
- Type: Minister
- Member of: Cabinet; State Council
- Reports to: the Prime minister
- Seat: Slotsholmen
- Appointer: The Monarch; (on the advice of the Prime Minister)
- Formation: 3 October 2011; 15 years ago
- First holder: Christine Antorini
- Succession: depending on the order in the State Council
- Deputy: Permanent Secretary
- Salary: 1.624.503,02 DKK (€217,931), in 2026
- Website: Official website

The Minister of Children (Danish: Børneminister), was first established during the first cabinet of Helle Thorning-Schmidt. The ministerial title has alternatively been assigned to the Minister of Education and the Minister of Social Affairs.

== List of ministers ==
No.	Portrait	Name (born-died)	Term of office			Political party	Government	Ref.
No.	Portrait	Name (born-died)	Took office	Left office	Time in office	Political party	Government	Ref.
Minister of Children and Education (Børne og undervisningsminister)
1		Christine Antorini (born 1965)	3 October 2011	3 February 2014	2 years, 123 days	Social Democrats	Thorning-Schmidt I	
Minister for Social Affairs, Children and Integration (Social-, børne- og integrationsminister)
2		Annette Vilhelmsen (born 1959)	9 August 2013	3 February 2014	178 days	Green Left	Thorning-Schmidt I	
Minister for Children Gender Equality, Integration and Social Affairs (Minister for Børn, Ligestilling, Integration og Sociale forhold)
3		Manu Sareen (born 1967)	3 February 2014	28 June 2015	1 year, 145 days	Social Liberals	Thorning-Schmidt II	
Minister for Children, Education and Gender Equality (Minister for børn, undervisning og ligestilling)
4		Ellen Trane Nørby (born 1980)	28 June 2015	28 November 2016	1 year, 153 days	Venstre	L. L. Rasmussen II	
Minister for Children and Social Affairs (Børne- og socialminister)
5		Mai Mercado (born 1980)	28 November 2016	27 June 2019	2 years, 211 days	Conservatives	L. L. Rasmussen III	
Minister of Children and Education (Børne- og undervisningsminister)
6		Pernille Rosenkrantz-Theil (born 1977)	27 June 2019	15 December 2022	3 years, 171 days	Social Democrats	Frederiksen I	
7		Mattias Tesfaye (born 1981)	15 December 2022	3 June 2026	3 years, 170 days	Social Democrats	Frederiksen II	
Minister of Children, Elderly Affairs, and Housing (Børne-, ældre- og boligminister)
8		Jacob Mark (born 1991)	3 June 2026	Incumbent	150 days	Green Left	Frederiksen III	
