= Sophie Løhde =

Danish politician (born 1983)

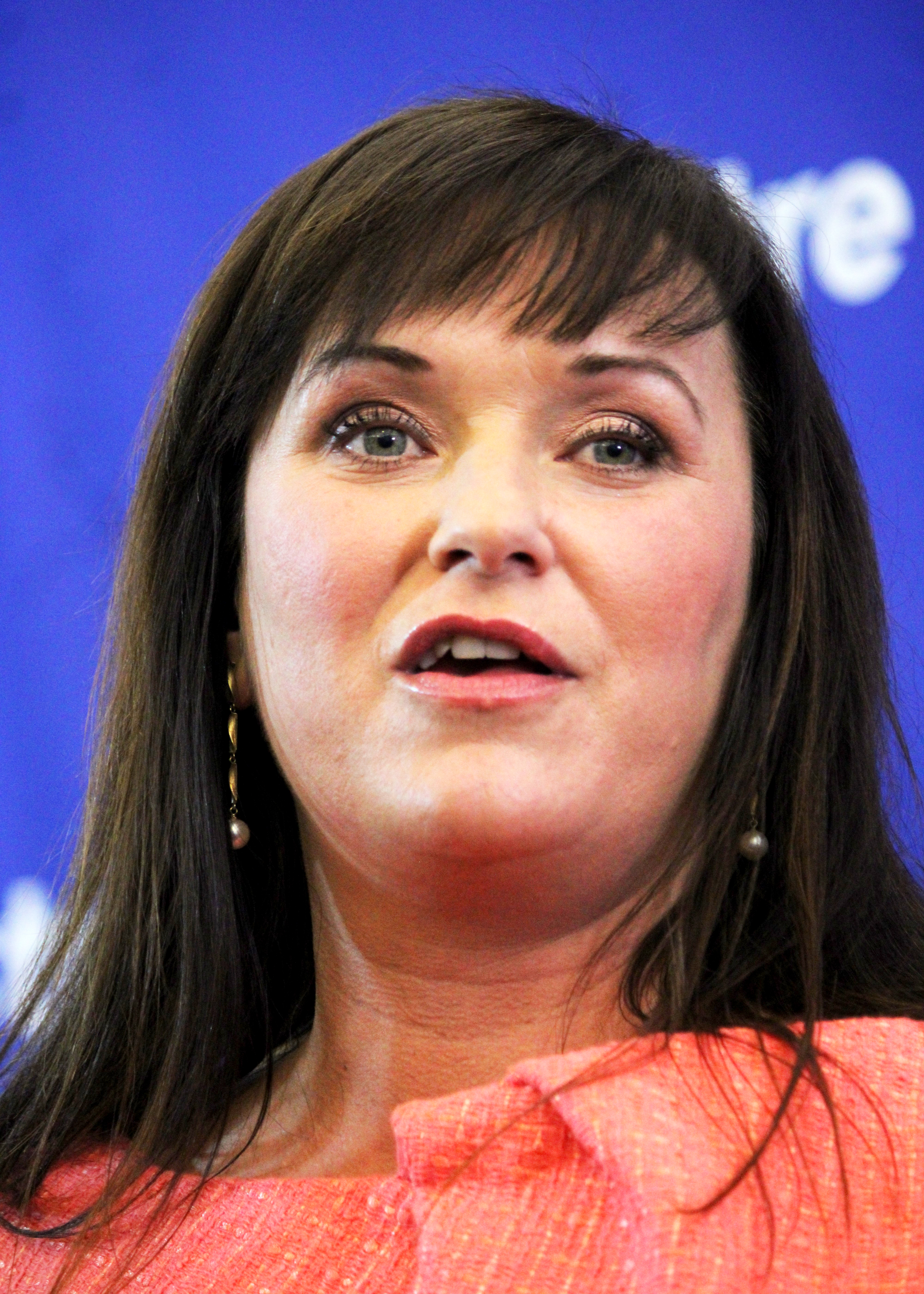
- Løhde in 2026

Minister of Interior and Health
- In office 15 December 2022 – 3 June 2026
- Prime Minister: Mette Frederiksen
- Preceded by: Magnus Heunicke (Health); Christian Rabjerg Madsen (Interior)
- Succeeded by: Ida Auken (Health); Pia Olsen Dyhr (Interior)

Minister of Health and Elderly Affairs
- In office 28 June 2015 – 28 November 2016
- Prime Minister: Lars Løkke Rasmussen
- Preceded by: Nick Hækkerup (Health)
- Succeeded by: Ellen Trane Nørby (Health); Thyra Frank (Elderly Affairs)

Minister of Public Innovation
- In office 28 November 2016 – 27 June 2019
- Prime Minister: Lars Løkke Rasmussen
- Preceded by: Position established
- Succeeded by: Position abolished

Member of the Folketing
- Incumbent
- Assumed office 13 November 2007
- Constituency: North Zealand

Personal details
- Born: 11 September 1983 (age 43) Birkerød, Denmark
- Party: Venstre

Sophie Løhde Jacobsen (born 11 September 1983) is a Danish politician, who is a member of the Folketing for the Venstre political party. She has been a member of parliament since the 2007 Danish general election, and served as Minister of Health from 2015 to 2016, and Minister of Public Innovation from 2016 to 2019.

== Background ==
Løhde was born on 11 September 1983 in Birkerød, Denmark. Løhde's father is Ole A. Jacobsen. Løhde's mother is Karin Løhde, an art dealer and former mayor. In 2007, Løhde earned a BSc degree in business economics and company communications from Copenhagen Business School.

== Career ==
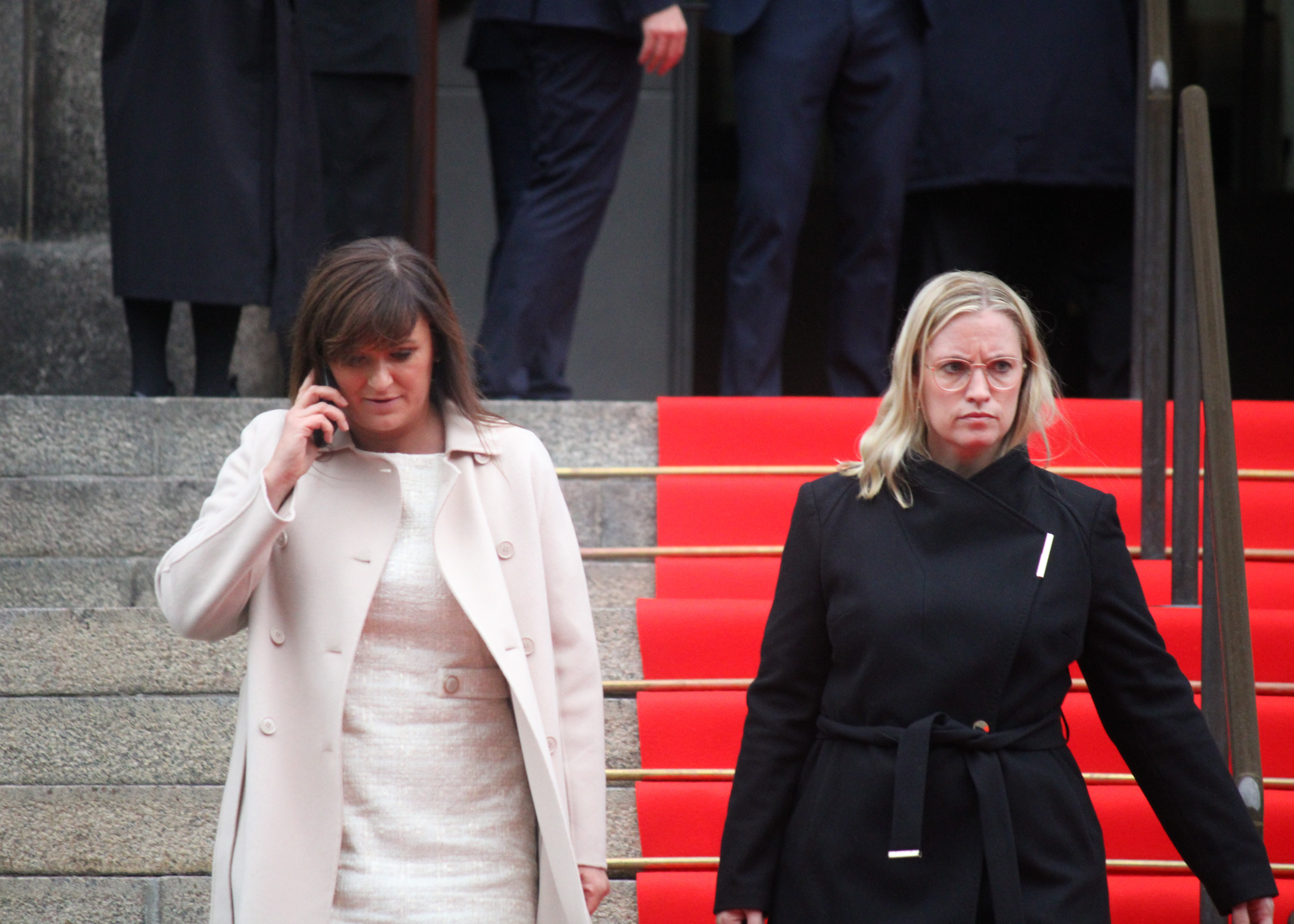
Løhde with Stephanie Lose at the 2025 opening of parliament

Løhde was a member of the Rudersdal Municipality Municipal Council from 2006 to 2007.Løhde was elected member of Folketinget for Venstre in 2007. She served as Minister for Health and Elderly Affairs in the Lars Løkke Rasmussen II Cabinet from 2015 to 2016. In 2016, Løhde became Minister of Public Innovation in the Lars Løkke Rasmussen III Cabinet until 2019. In 2022, she was appointed Minister for Health and the Elderly in the Mette Frederiksen II Cabinet.

Political offices
New office	Minister of Interior and Health; 2022–2026	Office demerged
New office	Minister for Elderly Affairs; 2015–2016	Succeeded by Thyra Frank
New office	Minister of Public Innovation; 2016–2019	Office abolished
Preceded by Nick Hækkerup	Minister of Health; 2015–2016	Succeeded by Ellen Trane Nørby
