= Frederiksen I Cabinet =

Government of Denmark from 2019 to 2022

First Mette Frederiksen cabinet
- 78th Cabinet of Denmark
- 2019–2022
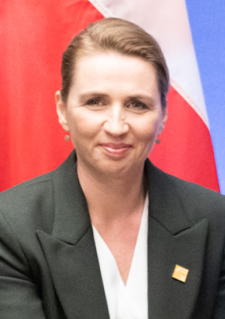
- Date formed: 27 June 2019
- Date dissolved: 15 December 2022

People and organisations
- Monarch: Margrethe II
- Prime Minister: Mette Frederiksen
- Prime Minister's history: Frederiksen II
- No. of ministers: 20
- Member parties: Social Democrats; Supported by: Social Liberals; Green Left; Red–Green Alliance
- Status in legislature: Minority government
- Opposition parties: Venstre; Danish People's Party; Conservatives; Alternative; New Right; Liberal Alliance

History
- Legislature term: 2019–2022
- Predecessor: Løkke Rasmussen III
- Successor: Frederiksen II

The first cabinet of Mette Frederiksen took office on 27 June 2019 and succeeded the third cabinet of Lars Løkke Rasmussen following the 2019 Danish general election. Headed by Prime Minister Mette Frederiksen, it was a minority government consisting of the Social Democrats. It relied on parliamentary support from the Red–Green Alliance, the Socialist People's Party, and the Social Liberal Party.

On 5 October 2022, Frederiksen announced a new election to the Folketing on 1 November 2022.

On 2 November 2022, Frederiksen informed the queen that the cabinet would resign that day, continuing in an acting capacity until a new government could be formed. On 13 December 2022, it was announced that a new majority government would be formed consisting of the Social Democrats, Venstre, and the Moderates, led by Frederiksen. The government was formed on 15 December 2022.

== List of ministers ==
Portfolio	Minister	Took office	Left office	Party	Ref
Prime Minister	Mette Frederiksen	27 June 2019	15 December 2022	Social Democrats	
Minister of Finance	Nicolai Wammen	27 June 2019	15 December 2022	Social Democrats	
Minister of Foreign Affairs	Jeppe Kofod	27 June 2019	15 December 2022	Social Democrats	
Minister of Justice	Nick Hækkerup	27 June 2019	2 May 2022	Social Democrats	
Minister of Justice	Mattias Tesfaye	2 May 2022	15 December 2022	Social Democrats	
Minister of Social and Elderly Affairs	Astrid Krag	27 June 2019	15 December 2022	Social Democrats	
Minister of Taxation	Morten Bødskov	27 June 2019	4 February 2022	Social Democrats	
Minister of Taxation	Jeppe Bruus Christensen	4 February 2022	15 December 2022	Social Democrats	
Minister of Climate, Energy and Utilities	Dan Jørgensen	27 June 2019	15 December 2022	Social Democrats	
Minister of Food, Agriculture, Fisheries	Mogens Jensen	27 June 2019	18 November 2020	Social Democrats	
Minister of Food, Agriculture, Fisheries	Rasmus Prehn	19 November 2020	15 December 2022	Social Democrats	
Minister of Nordic Cooperation	Mogens Jensen	27 June 2019	18 November 2020	Social Democrats	
Minister of Nordic Cooperation	Flemming Møller Mortensen	19 November 2020	15 December 2022	Social Democrats	
Minister for Health	Magnus Heunicke	27 June 2019	15 December 2022	Social Democrats	
Minister of Transport	Benny Engelbrecht	27 June 2019	3 February 2022	Social Democrats	
Minister of Transport	Trine Bramsen	4 February 2022	15 December 2022	Social Democrats	
Minister of Development Cooperation	Rasmus Prehn	27 June 2019	19 November 2020	Social Democrats	
Minister of Development Cooperation	Flemming Møller Mortensen	19 November 2020	15 December 2022	Social Democrats	
Minister of Children and Education	Pernille Rosenkrantz-Theil	27 June 2019	15 December 2022	Social Democrats	
Minister of Defence	Trine Bramsen	27 June 2019	4 February 2022	Social Democrats	
Minister of Defence	Morten Bødskov	4 February 2022	15 December 2022	Social Democrats	
Minister of Science, Technology, Information and Higher Education	Ane Halsboe-Jørgensen	27 June 2019	16 August 2021	Social Democrats	
Minister of Science, Technology, Information and Higher Education	Jesper Petersen	16 August 2021	15 December 2022	Social Democrats	
Minister of Business Affairs	Simon Kollerup	27 June 2019	15 December 2022	Social Democrats	
Minister of Immigration and Integration	Mattias Tesfaye	27 June 2019	2 May 2022	Social Democrats	
Minister of Immigration and Integration	Kaare Dybvad	2 May 2022	15 December 2022	Social Democrats	
Minister of Employment	Peter Hummelgaard Thomsen	27 June 2019	15 December 2022	Social Democrats	
Minister of Gender Equality	Peter Hummelgaard Thomsen	27 June 2019	4 February 2022	Social Democrats	
Minister of Gender Equality	Trine Bramsen	4 February 2022	15 December 2022	Social Democrats	
Minister of the Interior and Housing	Kaare Dybvad	27 June 2019	2 May 2022	Social Democrats	
Minister of the Interior and Housing	Christian Rabjerg Madsen	2 May 2022	15 December 2022	Social Democrats	
Minister of the Environment	Lea Wermelin	27 June 2019	15 December 2022	Social Democrats	
Minister of Culture and Ecclesiastical Affairs	Joy Mogensen	27 June 2019	16 August 2021	Social Democrats	
Minister of Culture and Ecclesiastical Affairs	Ane Halsboe-Jørgensen	16 August 2021	15 December 2022	Social Democrats	

Preceded by Løkke Rasmussen III	Cabinet of Denmark; 2019–2022	Succeeded by Frederiksen II
