= Mattias Tesfaye =

Danish politician

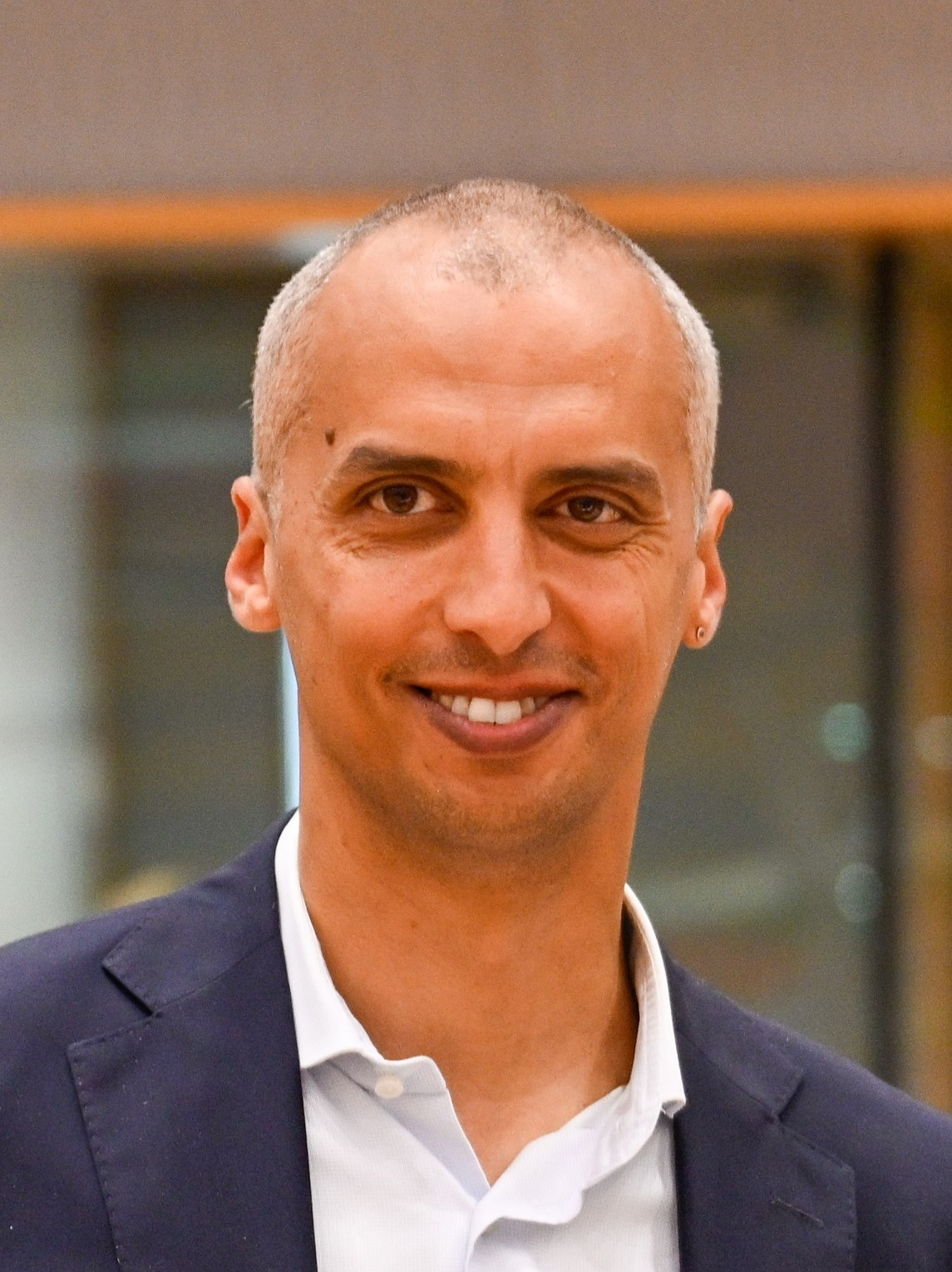
- Tesfaye in 2025

Minister for Children and Education
- In office 15 December 2022 – 3 June 2026
- Prime Minister: Mette Frederiksen
- Preceded by: Pernille Rosenkrantz-Theil
- Succeeded by: Magnus Heunicke (Education); Jacob Mark (Children)

Minister of Justice
- In office 2 May 2022 – 15 December 2022
- Prime Minister: Mette Frederiksen
- Preceded by: Nick Hækkerup
- Succeeded by: Peter Hummelgaard

Minister for Immigration and Integration
- In office 27 June 2019 – 2 May 2022
- Prime Minister: Mette Frederiksen
- Preceded by: Inger Støjberg
- Succeeded by: Kaare Dybvad

Member of the Folketing
- Incumbent
- Assumed office 18 June 2015
- Constituency: Greater Copenhagen

Personal details
- Born: 31 March 1981 (age 45) Aarhus, Denmark
- Party: Social Democrats (since 2013)
- Other political affiliations: Communist/Marxist-Leninist (1995–2005); Red–Green Alliance (2005–2008); Socialist People's (2008–2013)
- Spouse: Signe Hagel Andersen
- Children: 2

Mattias Tesfaye (born 31 March 1981) is a Danish politician for the Social Democrats. He served as Minister for Education and Children from 2022 to 2026. He previously served as Minister for Justice from February to December 2022 and Minister for Immigration and Integration from 2019 to 2022, and has been member of the Folketing since 2015.

== Background ==
He was born in Aarhus in 1981 to Tesfaye Mammo (an Ethiopian refugee) and Jytte Svensson, and is currently married to Signe Hagel Andersen. The couple has two children.

== Political career ==
Before he joined the Social Democrats in 2015 Tesfaye was a prominent member and former vice chairman of the Socialist People's Party. He has also previously been a member of both the Red–Green Alliance and the now defunct Communist Party of Denmark/Marxist–Leninists. He was elected member of Folketinget for the Social Democrats in 2015.

Tesfaye was appointed Minister for Immigration and Integration in the Frederiksen Cabinet on 27 June 2019. Under his leadership, Denmark's government approached countries both in and outside the European Union about a potential asylum deal, including Tunisia and Ethiopia. Denmark also signed a diplomatic agreement with Rwanda on asylum and political matters.

After Nick Hækkerup stepped down as Minister of Justice on May 2, 2022, Tesfaye was appointed to the position. Since December 2022, he has been Minister of Children and Education.

== Political positions ==
On asylum rights, Tesfaye has a very restrictive position, setting the goal of Denmark having "no asylum seekers any more at all". Tesfaye has also stated that a large portion of Islam is represented by radical Islamists, and that Muslims have to adapt to Danish values.

Political offices
Preceded by Inger Støjberg	Minister for Immigration and Integration; 2019–2022	Succeeded by Kaare Dybvad
Preceded by Nick Hækkerup	Minister for Justice; 2022–present	Succeeded by Incumbent
