= Thorning-Schmidt I Cabinet =

Danish government from 2011 to 2014

- 74th Cabinet of Denmark

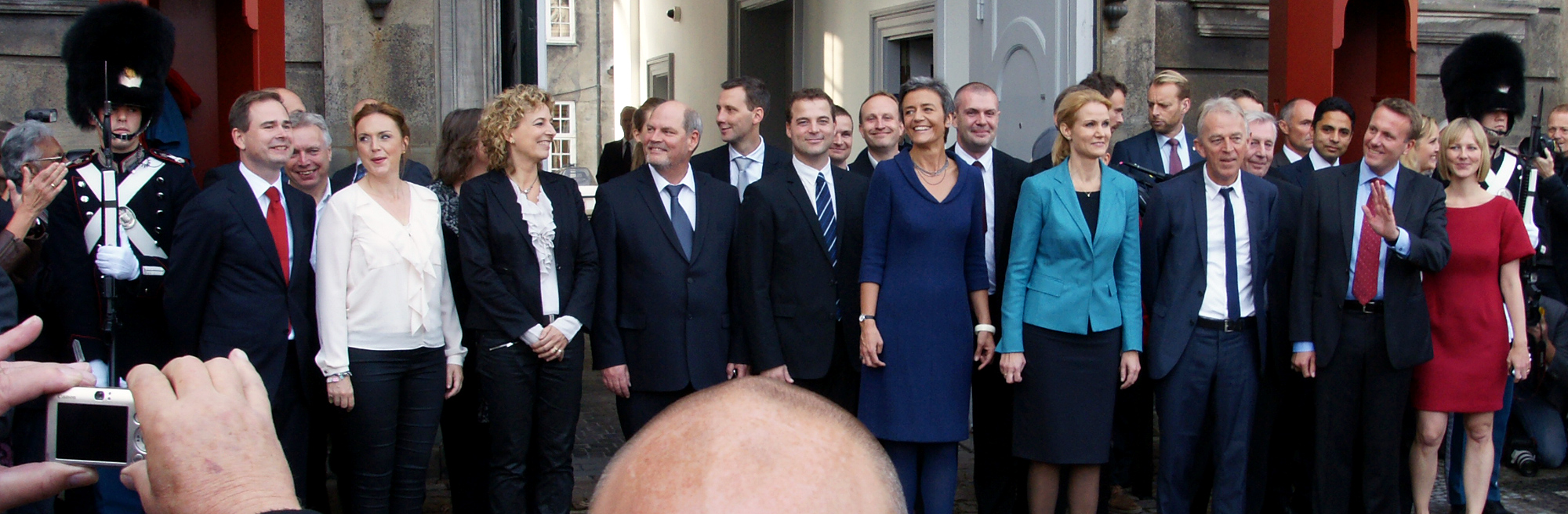
- Cabinet of Helle Thorning-Schmidt in front of Amalienborg
- Date formed: 3 October 2011
- Date dissolved: 3 February 2014

People and organisations
- Head of state: Margrethe II of Denmark
- Head of government: Helle Thorning-Schmidt
- Member parties: Social Democrats; Social Liberals; Green Left; Supported by: Red-Green Alliance
- Status in legislature: Minority coalition government
- Opposition parties: Venstre; Danish People's Party; Liberal Alliance; Conservatives; Alternative

History
- Incoming formation: 2011
- Outgoing formation: 2014
- Election: 2011 general election
- Predecessor: L. L. Rasmussen I
- Successor: Thorning-Schmidt II

The cabinet of Prime Minister Helle Thorning-Schmidt was the cabinet government of Denmark from 3 October 2011 to 3 February 2014. It was a coalition between the Social Democrats, the Danish Social Liberal Party and the Socialist People's Party. On 9 August 2013, Helle Thorning-Schmidt made a cabinet reshuffle and on 12 December 2013, she made a second cabinet reshuffle. The cabinet resigned on 3 February 2014, following the Socialist People's Party left the government on 30 January 2014. It was succeeded by the Cabinet of Helle Thorning-Schmidt II.

Because of the government's minority status and its dependency on the support of the opposition, Venstre, the government had to jettison many of the policies that it had given during the election campaign. Although critics have accused the government of breaking its promises, other studies argue that it has already accomplished half of its stated goals, blaming instead poor public relations strategies for its increasingly negative public image.

== Government formations ==
At the parliamentary election on 15 September 2011, the governing Liberal Party remained the single largest party with the addition of one seat while the Social Democrats lost a seat. However, a three-party coalition of opposition parties together with the supporting Red-Green Alliance won a larger share of seats than the incumbent Liberal-Conservative government and their supporting parties the Liberal Alliance and Danish People's Party. Prime Minister Lars Løkke Rasmussen then tendered the cabinet's resignation to Queen Margrethe II on 16 September, following which she met with the leaders of all parties. She then tasked Social Democrat Helle Thorning-Schmidt with negotiating the formation of a new government. Rasmussen's cabinet remained in office as a caretaker government until 3 October, when Thorning-Schmidt's cabinet was sworn in making her the first female Prime Minister. The Social Liberal Party and the Socialist People's Party also became part of the three-party government. It was the first time the Socialist People's Party joined a government since its foundation in 1959.

On 30 January 2014 Annette Vilhelmsen, the leader of Socialist People's Party announced that the party would be leaving government, the result of extended turmoil over the proposed sale of DONG Energy shares to Goldman Sachs.

== List of ministers and portfolios ==
The Social Democrats had ten ministers including the Prime Minister. The smaller Social Liberal Party and Socialist People's Party each had six ministers.

Portfolio	Minister	Took office	Left office	Party
Prime Minister's Office
Prime Minister	Helle Thorning-Schmidt	3 October 2011	3 February 2014	Social Democrats
Minister of Economic Affairs and the Interior	Margrethe Vestager	3 October 2011	3 February 2014	Social Liberals
Ministry of Foreign Affairs
Minister for Foreign Affairs	Villy Søvndal	3 October 2011	12 December 2013	SF
Minister for Foreign Affairs	Holger K. Nielsen	12 December 2013	30 January 2014	SF
Minister for Development Cooperation	Christian Friis Bach	3 October 2011	21 November 2013	Social Liberals
Minister for Development Cooperation	Rasmus Helveg Petersen	21 November 2013	3 February 2014	Social Liberals
Minister of European Affairs	Nicolai Wammen	3 October 2011	9 August 2013	Social Democrats
Minister of European Affairs	Nick Hækkerup	9 August 2013	3 February 2014 (abolished)	Social Democrats
Minister of Trade and Investment	Pia Olsen Dyhr	3 October 2011	9 August 2013 (abolished)	SF
Ministry of Finance
Minister for Finance	Bjarne Corydon	3 October 2011	3 February 2014	Social Democrats
Ministry of Justice
Minister for Justice	Morten Bødskov	3 October 2011	12 December 2013	Social Democrats
Minister for Justice	Karen Hækkerup	12 December 2013	3 February 2014	Social Democrats
Ministry of Defence
Minister for Defence	Nick Hækkerup	3 October 2011	9 August 2013	Social Democrats
Minister for Defence	Nicolai Wammen	9 August 2013	3 February 2014	Social Democrats
Ministry of Culture
Minister for Culture	Uffe Elbæk	3 October 2011	5 December 2012	Social Liberals
Minister for Culture	Marianne Jelved	6 December 2012	3 February 2014	Social Liberals
Ministry of Taxation
Minister for Taxation	Thor Möger Pedersen	3 October 2011	16 October 2012	SF
Minister for Taxation	Holger K. Nielsen	16 October 2012	12 December 2013	SF
Minister for Taxation	Jonas Dahl	12 December 2013	30 January 2014	SF
Ministry of Science, Innovation and Higher Education
Minister for Research, Innovation and Higher Education	Morten Østergaard	3 October 2011	3 February 2014	Social Liberals
Ministry of Economic and Business Affairs
Minister for Business and Growth	Ole Sohn	3 October 2011	16 October 2012	SF
Minister for Business and Growth	Annette Vilhelmsen	16 October 2012	9 August 2013	SF
Minister for Business and Growth	Henrik Sass Larsen	9 August 2013	3 February 2014	Social Democrats
Ministry of Housing, Urban and Rural Affairs
Minister for the City, Housing and Rural Affairs	Carsten Hansen	3 October 2011	3 February 2014	Social Democrats
Ministry of Employment
Minister for Employment	Mette Frederiksen	3 October 2011	3 February 2014	Social Democrats
Ministry of Education
Minister for Education	Christine Antorini	3 October 2011	3 February 2014	Social Democrats
Ministry of Social Affairs
Minister for Integration and Social Affairs	Karen Hækkerup	3 October 2011	9 August 2013	Social Democrats
Minister for Integration and Social Affairs	Annette Vilhelmsen	9 August 2013	30 January 2014	SF
Ministry of Food, Agriculture and Fisheries
Minister for Food, Agriculture and Fisheries	Mette Gjerskov	3 October 2011	9 August 2013	Social Democrats
Minister for Food, Agriculture and Fisheries	Karen Hækkerup	9 August 2013	12 December 2013	Social Democrats
Minister for Food, Agriculture and Fisheries	Dan Jørgensen	12 December 2013	3 February 2014	Social Democrats
Ministry of Climate and Energy
Minister for Climate and Energy	Martin Lidegaard	3 October 2011	3 February 2014	Social Liberals
Ministry of Transport
Minister of Transport	Henrik Dam Kristensen	3 October 2011	9 August 2013	Social Democrats
Minister of Transport	Pia Olsen Dyhr	9 August 2013	30 January 2014	SF
Ministry of Health
Minister for Health and Prevention	Astrid Krag	3 October 2011	30 January 2014	SF
Ministry of the Environment
Minister for the Environment	Ida Auken	3 October 2011	30 January 2014	SF
Minister for Ecclesiastical Affairs
Minister for Equality, Church and Nordic Cooperation	Manu Sareen	3 October 2011	3 February 2014	Social Liberals

Preceded by Lars Løkke Rasmussen	Cabinet of Denmark; 2011-2014	Succeeded by Helle Thorning-Schmidt II
