= Pia Olsen Dyhr =

Danish politician (born 1971)

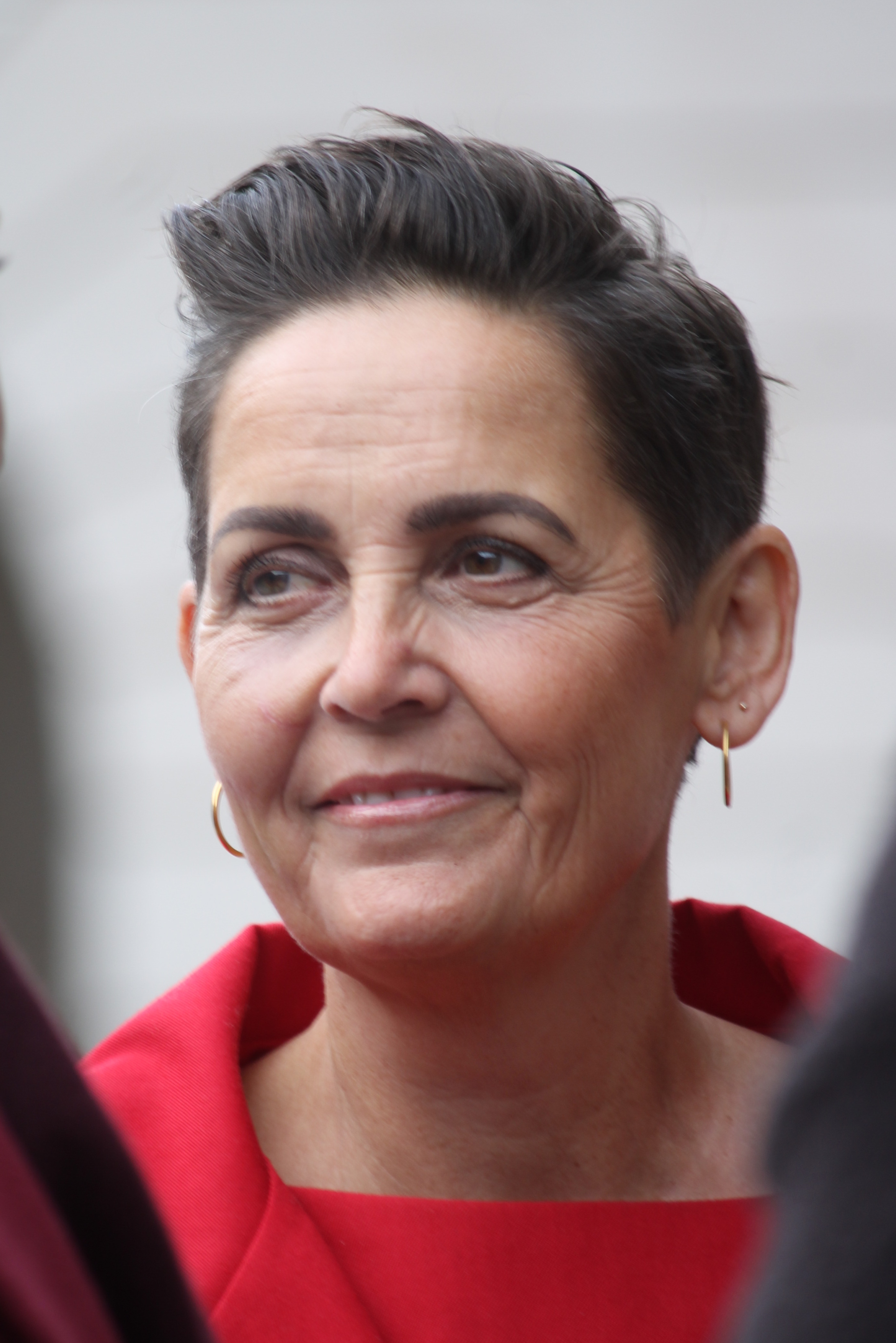
- Dyhr in 2025

Minister of Economic Affairs and the Interior
- Incumbent
- Assumed office 3 June 2026
- Prime Minister: Mette Frederiksen
- Preceded by: Stephanie Lose (Economic Affairs); Sophie Løhde (Interior)

Leader of the Green Left
- Incumbent
- Assumed office 13 February 2014
- Preceded by: Annette Vilhelmsen
Ministerial positions
Minister of Trade and Investment
In office 3 October 2011 – 9 August 2013
Prime Minister	Helle Thorning-Schmidt
Preceded by	Brian Mikkelsen
Succeeded by	Nick Hækkerup
Minister of Transport
In office 9 August 2013 – 3 February 2014
Prime Minister	Helle Thorning-Schmidt
Preceded by	Henrik Dam Kristensen
Succeeded by	Magnus Heunicke

Member of the Folketing
- Incumbent
- Assumed office 13 November 2007
- Constituency: Zealand (since 2024); Copenhagen (2015-2024); North Zealand (2007–2015)

Personal details
- Born: 30 November 1971 (age 54) Vallensbæk, Denmark
- Party: Green Left
- Education: College of Europe; University of Copenhagen

Pia Olsen Dyhr (born 30 November 1971) is a Danish politician and leader of the Green Left serving as Minister of Economic Affairs and the Interior since 2026. She has been a member of the Folketing since the 2007 Danish general election. Dyhr served as Minister of Trade and Investment and later Minister of Transport in the Helle Thorning-Schmidt I Cabinet. Following her party's resignation from the cabinet, Dyhr was elected as chairwoman of the party.

== Early life and education ==
Dyhr grew up in Vallensbæk; her father worked at DSB and her mother was a cleaner. She graduated from Ishøj Gymnasium in 1985 and later studied at the College of Europe from 1992 to 1993 where she received an MA in European studies. In 1994, she graduated from the University of Copenhagen with a degree in political science.

== Political career ==
From 1996 to 1998, Dyhr was leader of the Popular Socialist Youth of Denmark, which is the youth wing of the Green Left. Dyhr was first a member of the Folketing from 28 November 2006 to 15 December 2006, acting as a temporary substitute member for Poul Henrik Hedeboe. She was first elected directly to parliament in the 2007 general election. She was reelected in 2011 with 2,461 votes, in 2015 with 9,575 votes, and in 2019 with 20,047 votes.

In 2014, Dyhr was elected chairman of the Green Left, succeeding Annette Vilhelmsen. In the 2015 Danish general election, the Green Left only got 4,2% of the Danish vote, which was the worst result for the party since 1977. In the 2019 Danish general election, the party ran on a platform of a minimum number of childcare workers, and a national climate law, getting 7,7% of the vote. In the 2022 Danish general election, the red bloc government led by Mette Frederiksen won a narrow majority; however, both before and after the election, Frederiksen instead called for the formation of a grand coalition government. The formation of the Frederiksen II Cabinet made SF the largest party in the opposition with 15 seats, an increase of one compared to the 2019 election.

On 20 March 2022, the party congress voted for the official English name of the party to be "Green Left", as the previous English name ("Socialist People's Party", a literal translation of the Danish name; the party abbreviation of SF continued to be used by the party in all English language texts) sounded like Eastern Europe's former Communist parties. After the vote, Dyhr said: "It's reminiscent of the communist parties in Russia and China. And we have no interest in that. We are far from them. We actually arose as a reaction to them." Since the November 2022 general election, where the party got 8,1% of the vote, the Green Left began to rose in the polls, getting to 17,7% in a 2024 Megafon poll.

In the 2024 European Parliament election in Denmark, the Green Left won the most votes of any party, winning a national election in Denmark for the first time, and elected 3 MEPs. As a result of this success, Dyhr argued that the largest party in the red bloc should hold the Prime Minister of Denmark post. In December 2025, a Prime Minister from the Green Left over one from the Social Democrats was preferred by the Red–Green Alliance, although the Green Left stated they do not see themselves getting the position any time soon.

In the 2026 Danish general election, the red bloc won a relative but not absolute majority, with her party becoming the second most voted party with 11.6% of the vote. As a result, the Green Left gained 5 seats, becoming the second-largest party in the Folketing with 20 seats. Dyhr said of the party's "historic" success that the Danish people had provided it with a mandate and she was "ready to negotiate"; however, she made it clear that if welfare and the green transition were not prioritised, the party would remain in opposition.

== Political views ==
During the 2023 debate on Store Bededag, Dyhr advocated for preserving this public holiday by proposing an increase in working hours throughout the year. She also called for postponing the decision to scrap Store Bededag until after the next Danish general election.

Political offices
Preceded by Brian Mikkelsen	Minister of Trade and Investment; 2011–2013	Succeeded by Nick Hækkerup
Preceded by Henrik Dam Kristensen	Minister of Transport; 2013–2014	Succeeded by Magnus Heunicke
Preceded by Annette Vilhelmsen	Leader of the Green Left; 2014–	Succeeded by Incumbent
