= Peter Hummelgaard =

Danish politician (born 1983)

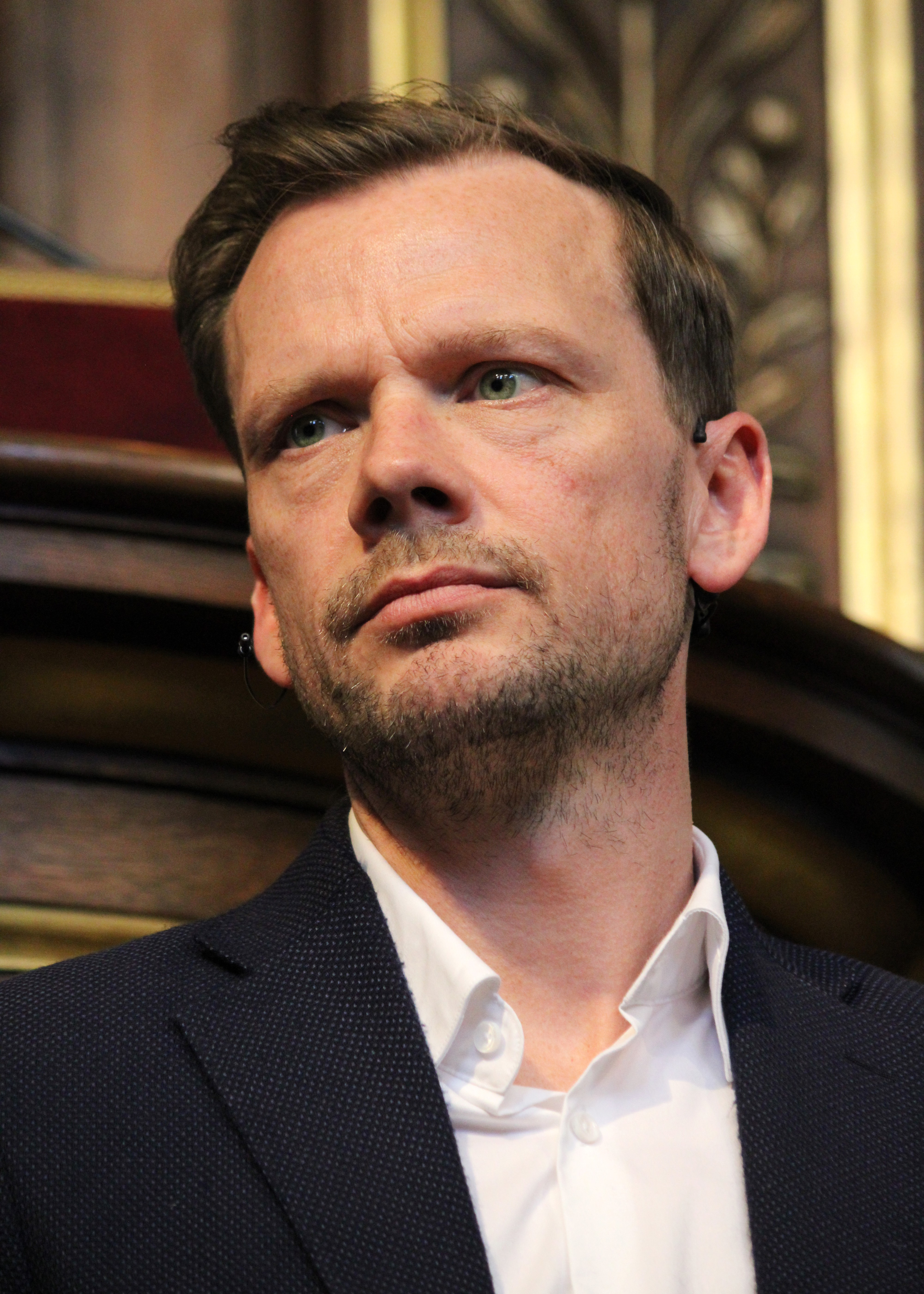
- Hummelgaard in 2026

Minister for Finance
- Incumbent
- Assumed office 3 June 2026
- Prime Minister: Mette Frederiksen
- Preceded by: Nicolai Wammen

Minister for Justice
- In office 15 December 2022 – 3 June 2026
- Prime Minister: Mette Frederiksen
- Preceded by: Mattias Tesfaye
- Succeeded by: Nicolai Wammen

Minister for Employment
- In office 27 June 2019 – 15 December 2022
- Prime Minister: Mette Frederiksen
- Preceded by: Troels Lund Poulsen
- Succeeded by: Ane Halsboe-Jørgensen

Member of the Folketing
- Incumbent
- Assumed office 18 June 2015
- Constituency: Copenhagen

Personal details
- Born: 17 January 1983 (age 43) Tårnby, Denmark
- Party: Social Democrats

Peter Hummelgaard Thomsen (born 17 January 1983) is a Danish writer and politician, who is a member of the Folketing for the Social Democrats political party. He was the Minister for Employment from 2019 to 2022, the Minister of Justice from 2022 to 2026 and Minister of Finance since 2026. He was elected into parliament in the 2015 Danish general election. He is a chief architect of the Regulation to Prevent and Combat Child Sexual Abuse (Chat Control) proposal.

== Background ==
Hummelgaard was born in Tårnby to Jan Thomsen and Susanne Pedersen.

== Political career ==
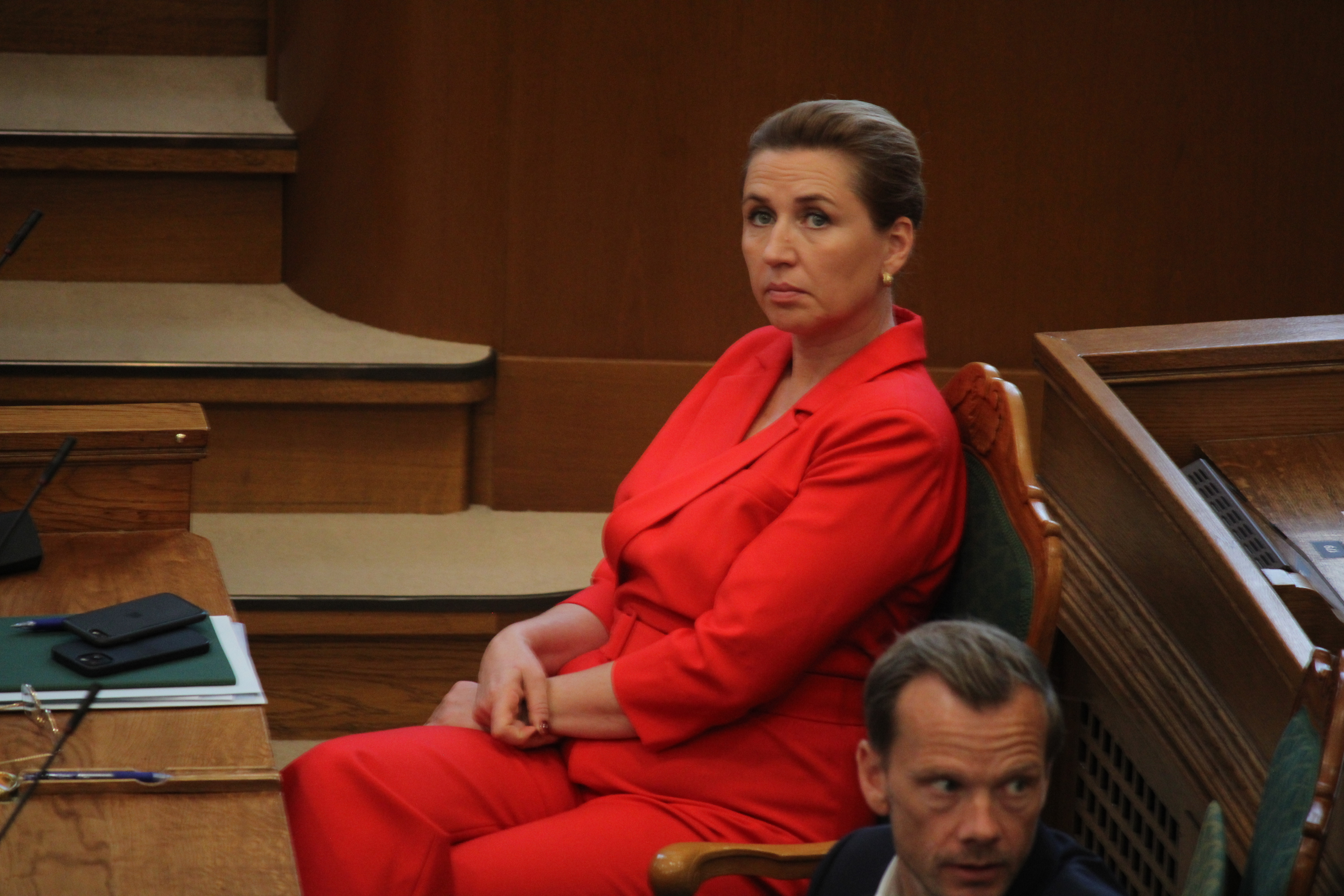
Hummelgaard in parliament with Prime Minister Mette Frederiksen, 2025

Hummelgaard was elected member of Folketinget for the Social Democrats in the 2015 election and reelected in 2019. After the 2019 election, the Social Democrats formed a government and Hummelgaard was appointed Minister for Employment in the Frederiksen Cabinet. After Mogens Jensen stepped down as Minister of Food, Fisheries and Gender Equality the cabinet underwent a slight shuffle. In this shuffle, Hummelgaard was appointed Minister of Gender Equality in addition to Minister of Employment.

In 2018 his book Den Syge Kapitalisme (The Sick Capitalism) was published. In it, he describes a new social contract between different groups in society to fight for a more just society.

== Controversies ==
Hummelgaard's opposition to consumers being able to encrypt messages has drawn concern from privacy rights activists in the European Union. Hummelgaard denies encryption is a civil liberty and advocates for others to follow suit.

== Bibliography ==
- DeltagerDanmark (2013)
- Den syge kapitalisme (2018)

Political offices
Preceded by Troels Lund Poulsen	Minister for Employment; 2019 –	Succeeded by Incumbent
Preceded by Mogens Jensen	Ministry of Gender Equality; 2021 –	Succeeded by Incumbent
