= Minister of European Affairs (Denmark) =

Danish cabinet position

- Europaminister
- State coat of arms of the Kingdom of Denmark
- Longest serving Poul Nyboe Andersen; 2 February 1968 – 11 October 1971
- Ministry of Foreign Affairs
- Type: Minister
- Member of: Cabinet; State Council
- Reports to: the Prime minister
- Seat: Slotsholmen
- Appointer: The Monarch (on the advice of the Prime Minister)
- Formation: 21 September 1966; 59 years ago
- First holder: Tyge Dahlgaard
- Final holder: Marie Bjerre
- Abolished: 3 June 2026; 3 months ago
- Succession: depending on the order in the State Council
- Deputy: State Secretary for European Affairs and the Arctic
- Salary: 1.624.503,02 DKK (€217,931), in 2026

The Danish Minister of European Affairs (Danish: Europaminister), is a minister in the government of Denmark, with overall responsibility for strategy and policy related to European Affairs, placed within the Ministry of Foreign Affairs. Since Bertel Haarder, the position has been a temporary post related to the planning and execution of Denmark's Presidency of the Council of the European Union.

== List of ministers ==
No.	Portrait	Name (born-died)	Term of office			Political party	Government	Ref.
No.	Portrait	Name (born-died)	Took office	Left office	Time in office	Political party	Government	Ref.
Minister of Nordic Cooperation and European Affairs (Minister for nordiske anliggender samt europæiske anliggender)
1		Tyge Dahlgaard (1921–1985)	21 September 1966	1 October 1967	1 year, 10 days	Social Democrats	Krag II	
Minister of European Market Affairs (Minister for europæiske markedsanliggender)
2		Ivar Nørgaard (1922–2011)	1 October 1967	2 February 1968	124 days	Social Democrats	Krag II	
Minister of Nordic Affairs and European Market Affairs (Minister for nordiske anliggender samt europæiske markedsanliggender)
3		Poul Nyboe Andersen (1913–2004)	2 February 1968	11 October 1971	3 years, 251 days	Venstre	Baunsgaard	
Minister of Foreign Economy, European Market Affairs and Nordic Affairs (Minister for udenrigsøkonomi, europæiske markedsanliggender samt nordiske anliggender)
(2)		Ivar Nørgaard (1922–2011)	11 October 1971	19 December 1973	2 years, 49 days	Social Democrats	Krag III; Jørgensen I	
Minister without Portfolio (Minister of European Affairs) (Minister uden portefølje (Europaminister))
4		Bertel Haarder (born 1944)	27 November 2001	18 February 2005	3 years, 83 days	Venstre	A. F. Rasmussen I	
Minister of European Affairs (Europaminister)
5		Nicolai Wammen (born 1971)	3 October 2011	9 August 2013	1 year, 310 days	Social Democrats	Thorning-Schmidt I	
Minister of Trade and European Affairs (Handels- og europaminister)
6		Nick Hækkerup (born 1968)	9 August 2013	3 February 2014	178 days	Social Democrats	Thorning-Schmidt I	
Minister of European Affairs (Europaminister)
7		Marie Bjerre (born 1986)	29 August 2024	3 June 2026	1 year, 278 days	Venstre	Frederiksen II	
