= Minister for Elderly Affairs (Denmark) =

Danish cabinet position

Minister of Elderly Affairs
- Ældreminister
- State coat of arms of the Kingdom of Denmark

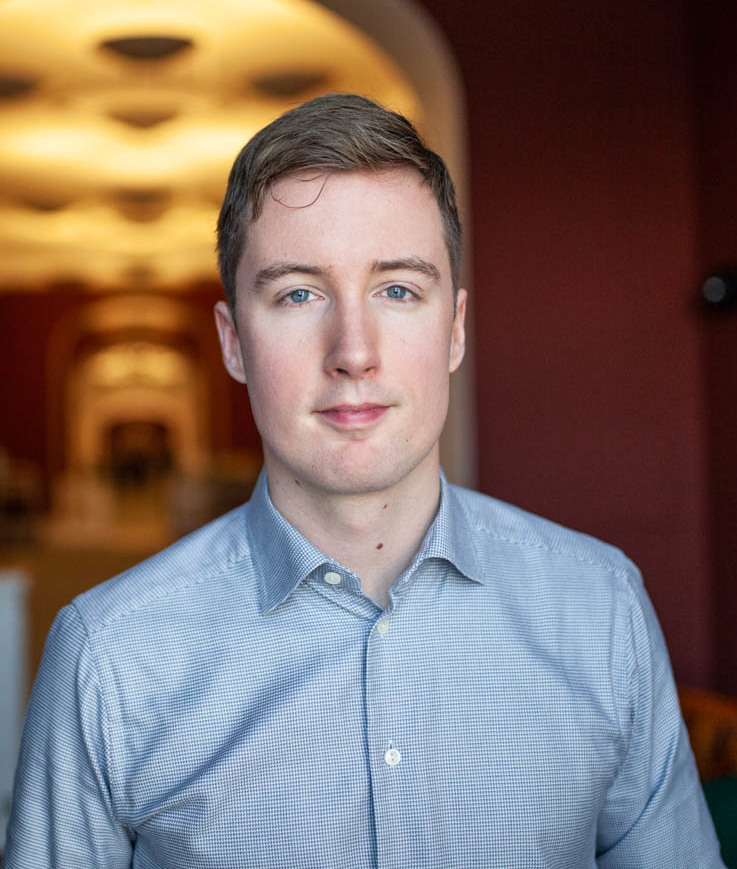
- Incumbent; Jacob Mark since 3 June 2026
- Ministry of Elderly Affairs
- Type: Minister
- Member of: Cabinet; State Council
- Reports to: the Prime minister
- Seat: Slotsholmen
- Appointer: The Monarch (on the advice of the Prime Minister)
- Formation: 28 June 2015; 11 years ago
- First holder: Sophie Løhde
- Succession: depending on the order in the State Council
- Deputy: Permanent Secretary
- Salary: 1.624.503,02 DKK (€217,931), in 2026

The Minister for Elderly Affairs (Danish: Ældreminister) is a Danish minister that works on improving elderly affairs.

== List of ministers ==
No.	Portrait	Name (born-died)	Term of office			Political party	Government	Ref.
No.	Portrait	Name (born-died)	Took office	Left office	Time in office	Political party	Government	Ref.
Minister of Health and Elderly Affairs (Sundheds- og ældreminister)
1		Sophie Løhde (born 1983)	28 June 2015	28 November 2016	1 year, 153 days	Venstre	L. L. Rasmussen II	
Minister of Elderly Affairs (Ældreminister)
2		Thyra Frank (born 1952)	28 November 2016	27 June 2019	2 years, 211 days	Liberal Alliance	L. L. Rasmussen III	
Minister of Health and Elderly Affairs (Sundheds- og ældreminister)
3		Magnus Heunicke (born 1981)	27 June 2019	21 January 2021	1 year, 208 days	Social Democrats	Frederiksen I	
Minister of Social and Elderly Affairs (Social- og ældreminister)
4		Astrid Krag (born 1982)	21 January 2021	15 December 2022	1 year, 328 days	Social Democrats	Frederiksen I	
Minister of Elderly Affairs (Ældreminister)
5		Mette Kierkgaard (born 1972)	15 December 2022	3 February 2026	3 years, 50 days	Moderates	Frederiksen II	
6		Henrik Frandsen (born 1961)	3 February 2026	3 June 2026	120 days	Moderates	Frederiksen II	
Minister of Children, Elderly Affairs and Housing (Børne-, ældre- og boligminister)
7		Jacob Mark (born 1991)	3 June 2026	Incumbent	96 days	Green Left	Frederiksen III	
