= Nick Hækkerup =

Danish politician

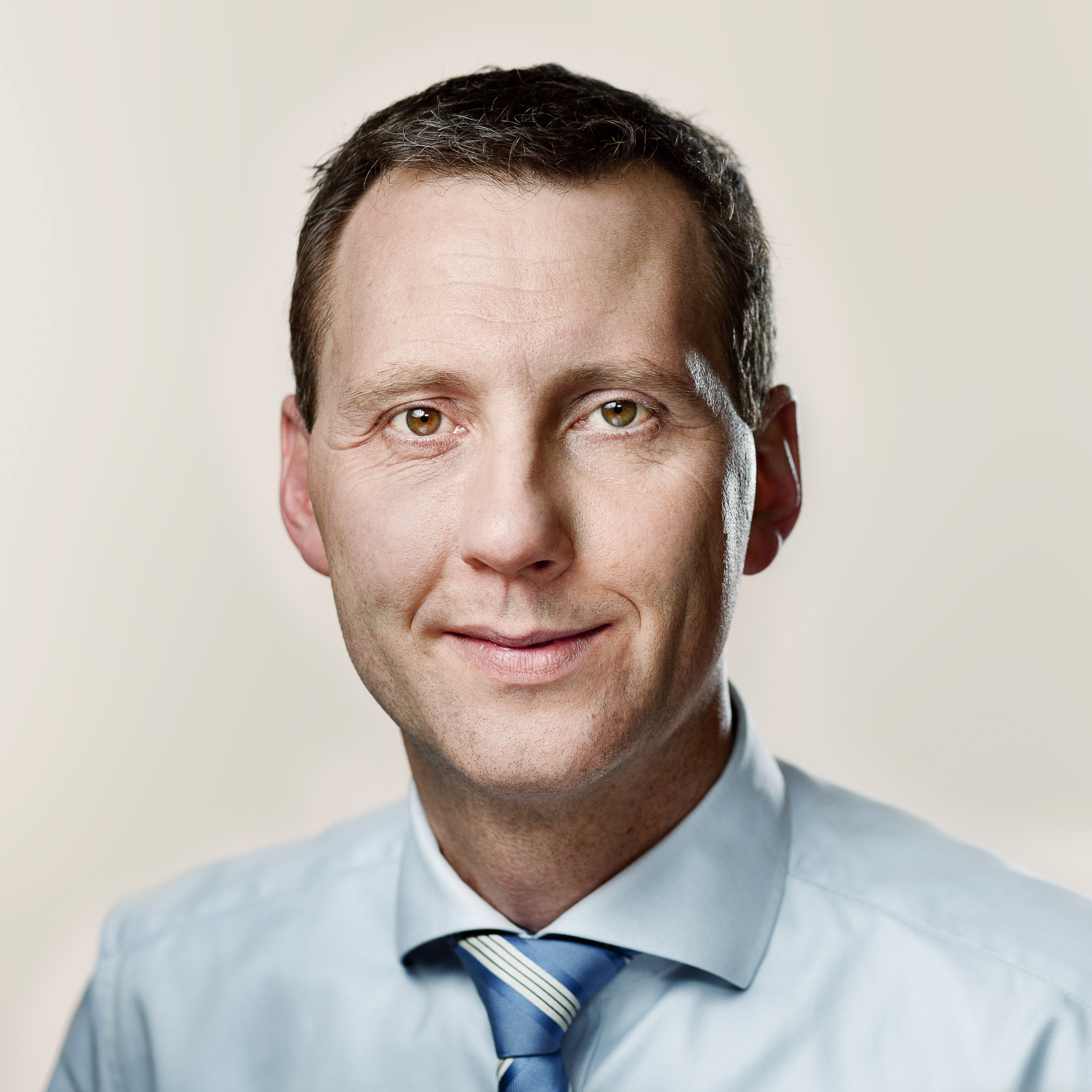
- Hækkerup in 2011

Minister of Justice
- In office 27 June 2019 – 2 May 2022
- Prime Minister: Mette Frederiksen
- Preceded by: Søren Pape Poulsen
- Succeeded by: Mattias Tesfaye

Minister of Health
- In office 3 February 2014 – 28 June 2015
- Prime Minister: Helle Thorning-Schmidt
- Preceded by: Astrid Krag
- Succeeded by: Sophie Løhde

Minister of Trade and European Affairs
- In office 9 August 2013 – 3 February 2014
- Prime Minister: Helle Thorning-Schmidt
- Preceded by: Nicolai Wammen
- Succeeded by: Position abolished

Minister of Defence
- In office 3 October 2011 – 9 August 2013
- Prime Minister: Helle Thorning-Schmidt
- Preceded by: Troels Lund Poulsen
- Succeeded by: Nicolai Wammen

Member of the Folketing
- Incumbent
- Assumed office 13 November 2007
- Constituency: North Zealand

Mayor of Hillerød
- In office 1 January 2007 – 13 November 2007
- Succeeded by: Kirsten Jensen
- In office 1 January 2000 – 31 December 2006
- Preceded by: Jens S. Jensen

Personal details
- Born: 3 April 1968 (age 58) Fredensborg, Denmark
- Party: Social Democrats
- Spouse: Petra Freisleben Hækkerup

Nick Hækkerup (born 3 April 1968) is a Danish writer and politician of Social Democrats who has been serving as the Minister of Justice in the Frederiksen Cabinet from 2019 to 2022. He previously served as Minister of Defence, and Minister of Health.

He has also written a number of books about the politics of the European Union, and on Danish politics.

== Political career ==
=== Career in local politics ===
Hækkerup was elected into the municipal council of the former Hillerød Municipality in the 1993 Danish local elections. He sat in the municipality's municipal council from 1994 and until the municipality was merged with Skævinge Municipality in 2007. The two municipalities formed a new Hillerød Municipality, where Hækkerup sat in the municipal council until 2007. Hækkerup was the mayor of the former Hillerød Municipality from 2000 to 2006 and of the new Hillerød Municipality from 2006 to 2007.

=== Career in national politics ===
Hækkerup was elected into parliament in the 2007 Danish general election, and was reelected in 2011, 2015 and 2019. He was the Minister of Defense in the Helle Thorning-Schmidt I Cabinet from 3 October 2011 to 9 August 2013 and in that same cabinet, he was Minister of European Affairs from 9 August 2013 to 3 February 2014. He was later appointed Minister of Health in the Helle Thorning-Schmidt II Cabinet from 3 February 2014 to 28 June 2015.

=== Minister of Justice (2019–2022) ===
In 2019, Hækkerup was appointed Minister of Justice, in the Frederiksen Cabinet. During his time in office, Denmark in April 2022 signed a general extradition treaty with the United Arab Emirates.

On 1 May 2022, it was announced that Hækkerup would be stepping down as justice minister and as an MP to become director of the danish brewery association, starting on 1 June.

== Personal life ==
Hækkerup is the grandson of Per Hækkerup, who was a minister under Jens Otto Krag and Anker Jørgensen. His uncle Hans Hækkerup was defence minister under Poul Nyrup Rasmussen.

Hækkerup has a PhD from Copenhagen University.

== Bibliography ==
- Udvikling i EU siden 1992 på de områder, der er omfattet af de danske forbehold (2001, Dansk Udenrigspolitisk Institut (DUPI))
- Controls and Sanctions in the EU law (2001, Djøf Forlag, co-author, ISBN 8757401969)
- Sandheden Kort – Christiansborg fra A til Å (2018, People's Press, co-author)

Political offices
Preceded by Troels Lund Poulsen	Minister of Defence; 2011–2013	Succeeded by Nicolai Wammen
Preceded by Nicolai Wammen	Minister of European Affairs; 2013–2014	Succeeded by Position abolished
Preceded by Pia Olsen Dyhr	Minister for Trade; 2013–2014	Succeeded by Mogens Jensen
Preceded by Astrid Krag	Minister of Health; 2014–2015	Succeeded by Sophie Løhde
Preceded by Søren Pape Poulsen	Justice Minister; 2019 –	Succeeded by Incumbent
