= Magnus Heunicke =

Danish journalist and politician

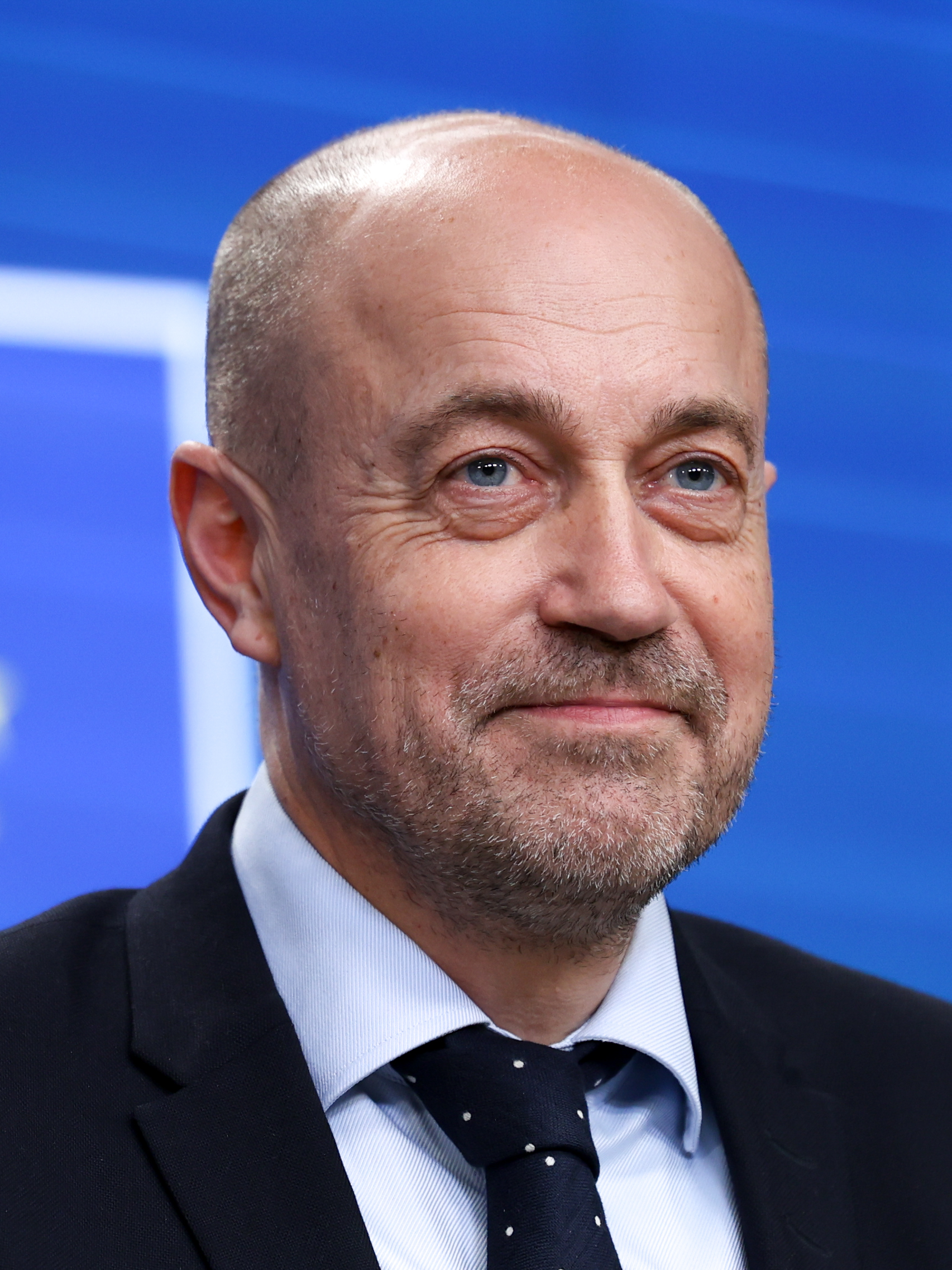
- Heunicke in 2025

Minister for the Environment
- In office 15 December 2022 – 3 June 2026
- Prime Minister: Mette Frederiksen
- Preceded by: Lea Wermelin
- Succeeded by: Maria Reumert Gjerding

Minister for Health
- In office 27 June 2019 – 15 December 2022
- Prime Minister: Mette Frederiksen
- Preceded by: Ellen Trane Nørby
- Succeeded by: Sophie Løhde (Interior and Health)

Minister of Elderly Affairs
- In office 27 June 2019 – 21 January 2021
- Prime Minister: Mette Frederiksen
- Preceded by: Thyra Frank
- Succeeded by: Astrid Krag

Minister for Transport
- In office 3 February 2014 – 28 June 2015
- Prime Minister: Helle Thorning-Schmidt
- Preceded by: Pia Olsen Dyhr
- Succeeded by: Hans Christian Schmidt

Member of the Folketing
- Incumbent
- Assumed office 8 February 2005
- Constituency: Zealand (from 2007); Storstrøm (2005-2007)

Personal details
- Born: 28 January 1975 (age 51) Næstved, Denmark
- Party: Social Democrats
- Spouse: Nina Groes
- Children: 2

Magnus Johannes Heunicke (born 28 January 1975) is a Danish journalist and politician who serves as a member of the Folketing for the Social Democrats political party. He was the Minister of Health from 2019 to 2022, and minister of elderly affairs from 2019 to 2021.

== Background ==
He was born in Næstved to former mayor Henning Jensen and school teacher Inger Heunicke, and is married to Nina Groes.

Heunicke has an education as a journalist, graduating from Aarhus journalist high school in 2002 and later working for DR in the period 2001-2005. Heunicke left the field of journalism in 2005 to pursue a parliamentary career. Before starting his education as a journalist, Heunicke graduated from Næstved gymnasium in Næstved, in 1995.

== Political career ==
Heunicke was first elected member of Folketinget for the Social Democrats in the 2005 Danish general election, and reelected in 2007 and 2011. In 2014 he was appointed Minister for Transport, after Pia Olsen Dyhr. He was reelected again in 2015 and 2019.

=== Minister of Health (2019-2022) ===
Heunicke was appointed Minister for Health and Elderly Affairs in the Frederiksen Cabinet from 27 June 2019.

Together with Frederiksen cabinet, he led the Danish government's response to the contain the spread of COVID-19 pandemic. In December 2020, COVID-19 vaccines reached the country and began to the administrated. From January 2021, he was only Minister of Health. In the summer of 2021, he also led the government’s response to a strike among more than 6,000 nurses over pay.

=== Minister of the Environment (2022–) ===
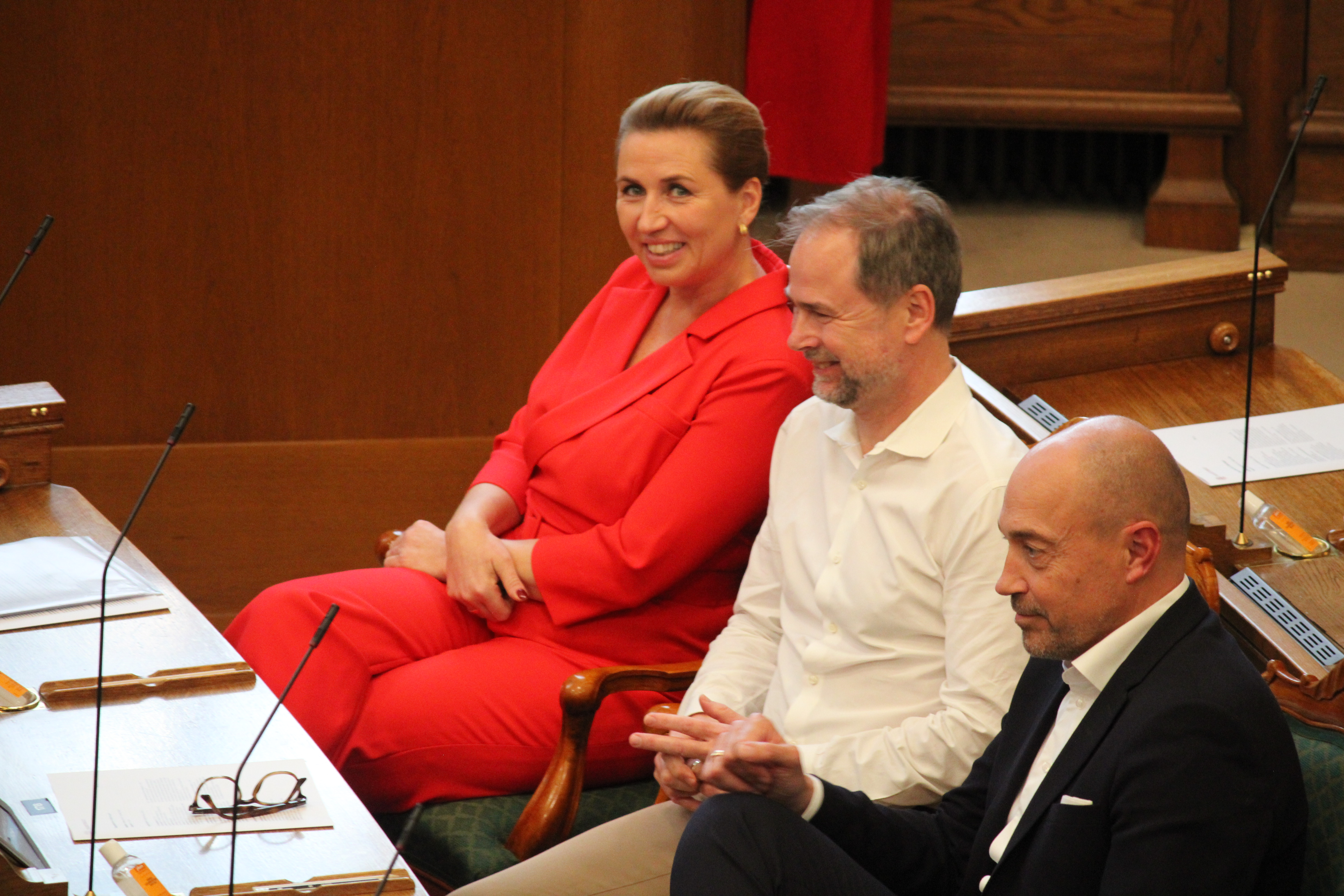
Heunicke with prime minister Mette Frederiksen and finance minister Nicolai Wammen, October 2025

Heunicke was appointed minister of the environment on 15 December 2022 in Mette Fredriksens second cabinet.

On 29 August 2024, he was appointed to also serve as minister for gender equality.

Political offices
Preceded by Pia Olsen Dyhr	Minister of Transport; 2014–2015	Succeeded by Hans Christian Schmidt
Preceded by Thyra Frank	Minister for Elderly Affairs; 2019–2021	Succeeded by Astrid Krag
Preceded by Ellen Trane Nørby	Minister of Health; 2019–2022	Succeeded by Sophie Løhde
Preceded by Lea Wermelin	Minister of the Environment; 2022–	Incumbent
