= Kaare Dybvad =

Danish politician

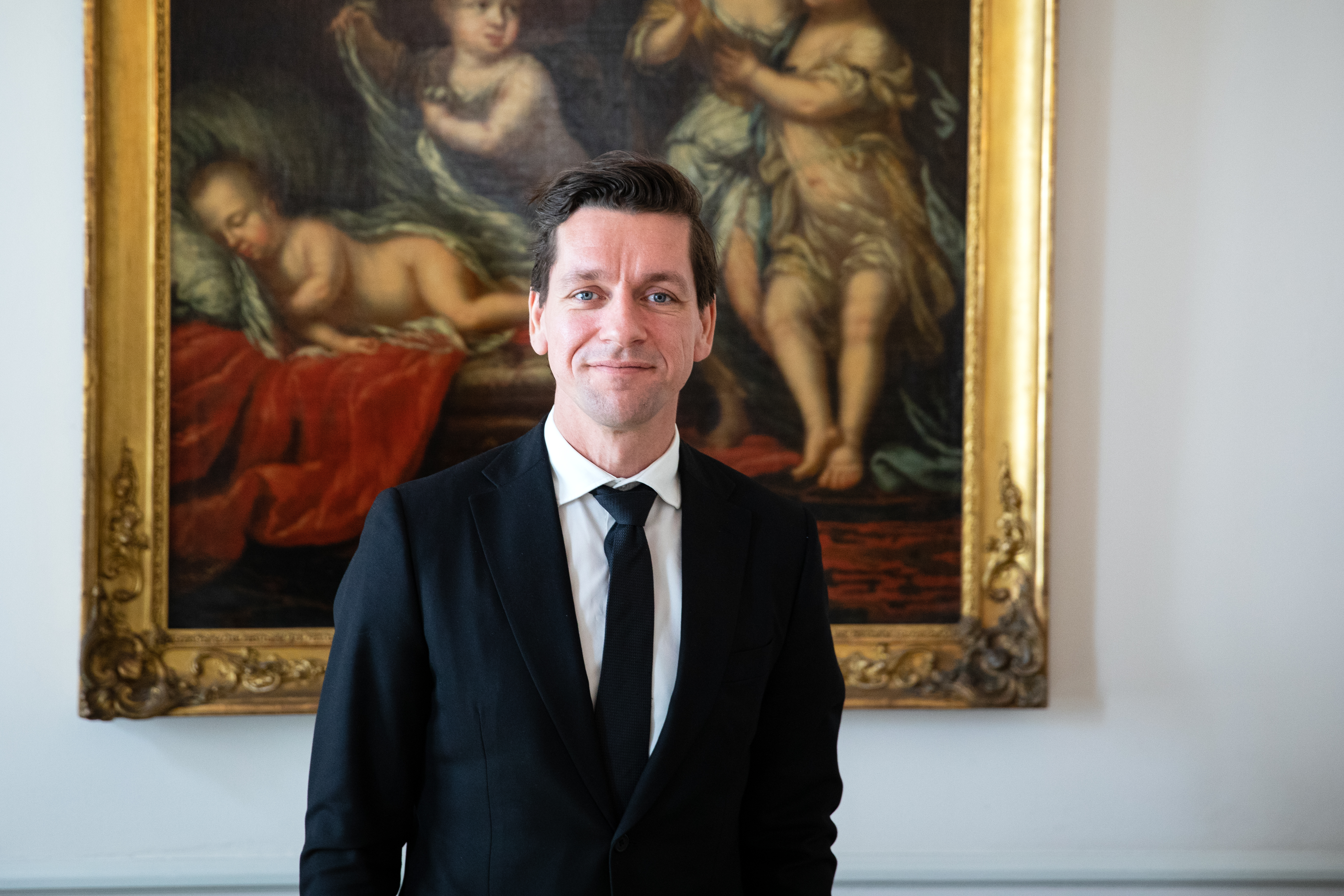
- Dybvad in 2023

Minister for Immigration and Integration
- In office 2 May 2022 – 23 September 2025
- Prime Minister: Mette Frederiksen
- Preceded by: Mattias Tesfaye
- Succeeded by: Rasmus Stoklund

Minister for Housing
- In office 27 June 2019 – 2 May 2022
- Prime Minister: Mette Frederiksen
- Preceded by: Ole Birk Olesen
- Succeeded by: Christian Rabjerg Madsen

Minister for the Interior
- In office 21 January 2021 – 2 May 2022
- Prime Minister: Mette Frederiksen
- Preceded by: Astrid Krag
- Succeeded by: Christian Rabjerg Madsen

Member of the Folketing
- Incumbent
- Assumed office 18 June 2015
- Constituency: Zealand

Personal details
- Born: 5 August 1984 (age 41) Holbæk, Denmark
- Party: Social Democrats

Kaare Dybvad Bek (born 5 August 1984) is a Danish politician, who is a member of the Folketing for the Social Democrats political party. He was elected into parliament at the 2015 Danish general election. He has been the Minister for Immigration and Integration from 2022 to 2025, the Minister for Building and Housing from 2019 to 2022 and Minister of the Interior from 2021 to 2022.

Dybvad was born in Holbæk to Jens Juul Dybvad Olesen and Dorte Simonsen, and is married to Maiken Bek.

== Political career ==
He was elected member of Folketinget for the Social Democrats from 2015. He was appointed Minister for Building and Housing in the Frederiksen Cabinet from 27 June 2019. In a reshuffle on 21 January 2021 Dybvad also became the Minister of the Interior.

In 2024 during major international e-sports event he issued a statement expressing his belief that Russian athletes should be banned from international sports events. However, he also noted that Denmark should adhere to current European regulations.

Political offices
Preceded by Ole Birk Olesen	Minister of Housing; 2019-	Succeeded by Incumbent
Preceded by Astrid Krag	Minister of the Interior; 2021-	Succeeded by Incumbent
