= Villy Søvndal =

Danish politician

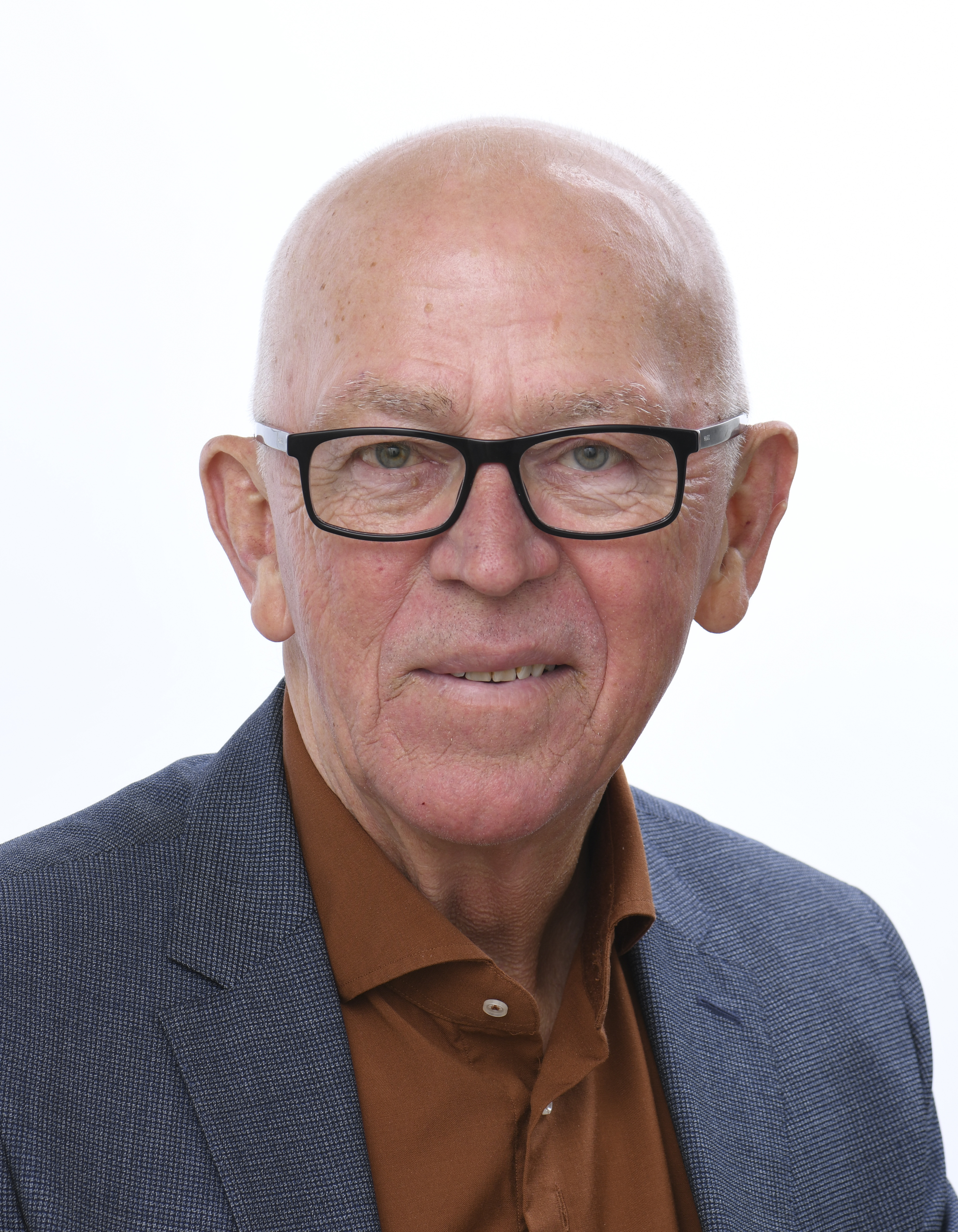
- Official portrait, 2024

Minister of Foreign Affairs
- In office 3 October 2011 – 12 December 2013
- Prime Minister: Helle Thorning-Schmidt
- Preceded by: Lene Espersen
- Succeeded by: Holger K. Nielsen

Member of the European Parliament for Denmark
- Incumbent
- Assumed office 16 July 2024

Leader of the Socialist People's Party
- In office 28 April 2005 – 13 October 2012
- Preceded by: Holger K. Nielsen
- Succeeded by: Annette Vilhelmsen

Member of the Folketing
- In office 1 August 1994 – 20 December 2013

Personal details
- Born: 4 April 1952 (age 74) Struer Municipality, Denmark
- Party: Socialist People's Party
- Spouse(s): Laila Rifbjerg (div.); Heidi Perto
- Children: 3

Villy Søvndal (born 4 April 1952) is a Danish politician who served as Denmark's Minister for Foreign Affairs from 2011 to 2013. He represented the Socialist People's Party (Socialistisk Folkeparti) in Parliament (Folketinget) from 1994 to 2013. He was selected as party leader in a 2005 vote, succeeding Holger K. Nielsen.

After he assumed this post, support for SF rose steadily in the polls, and in the 2007 parliamentary election the party received more than 13% of the votes, giving it 23 seats. After the election, support for SF continued to increase – up to 17–18% – but in the 2011 parliamentary election the party received only 9% of the vote and dropped down to 16 seats.

In 2008, Søvndal published an autobiography, Villys verden (Villy's World).

== Background ==
Villy Søvndal was born on 4 April 1952 in the town of Linde in the municipality of Struer. His father was Peter Søvndal, a smallholder, and his mother was Agnes. He attended Linde Skole from 1959 to 1966 and spent the next three years as a student at Nørreland School in Holstebro, passing the Llower secondary school examination in 1969. He graduated from Nørre Nissum Teacher Training College in 1971, passing the higher preparatory examination, and from 1971 to 1973 attended the now-defunct Vestbirk College of Music.

From 1976 to 1980 Søvndal studied to be a teacher at the now-defunct Kolding Teacher Training College. He received a teacher's certificate in 1980, and from 1980 to 1992 worked as a teacher with the Kolding school authority.

His own page at the SF party website describes him as having traveled a great deal as a young man, and says that his experiences in South America and Eastern Europe "were – in different ways – instructive in relation to problems of practical socialism".

== Political career ==
=== Early politics ===
His first political position was a seat on the Kolding town council, to which he was elected in 1982 and which he retained until 1994, with the exception of two periods (13–28 March 1986; 10 October 1991 – 13 January 1992), during which he was a temporary member of Parliament for Vejle County.

In August 1994 Søvndal became a full-time member of Folketinget. He soon became the party's spokesman on social policy and defense issues, for many years was chairman of the Parliamentary Committee on Social Affairs.

=== Party chairman ===
In April 2005, Søvndal was elected to replace Holger K. Nielsen as chairman of the SF. Some members doubted his ability to run the party, but these doubts were put to rest after the 2007 parliamentary election, in which SF quadrupled its number of seats. In February and March 2008, Søvndal attracted attention with remarks he made about the Islamist organization Hizb ut-Tahrir. For several weeks, SF did better in the polls than the Social Democrats, and other polls indicated that he enjoyed greater support than Helle Thorning-Schmidt, the leader of the opposition.

Søvndal received considerable praise for improving the party's popularity. In a September 2009 poll, 34% of respondents considered him the country's best party leader. The former press officer for the Conservatives in Parliament, Niels Krause-Kjær, has said about Søvndal: "With the dominance of the TV media, the mastery of the quick, well-timed one-liner is of enormous importance. There weren't many, to be sure, who had confidence that Villy Søvndal had this ability when he took control of SF, but they turned out to be totally wrong. He was pigeonholed as the slightly boring professional politician, but when the limitations fell away he started having fun. He enjoys the role as political leader and enjoys himself in a way nobody had expected".

Niels Krause-Kjær commented on Villy Søvndal's role in SF's success by saying that Søvndal has said himself that he thinks his strength lies in his ability to "communicate messages clearly and crisply", in his optimism, as well as in his ability to use humor in political debate. After his election as party leader, some members criticized the party for focusing too intensely on Søvndal. The presence of several large posters of Søvndal at SF's national convention in 2007 drew criticism. Søvndal himself later replied the criticism by saying that "modern politics is also about people and trust in people", while emphasizing that he was not a power-grabber.

During the run-up to the 2011 parliamentary elections, however, support for SF sank considerably, and the election results, which dropped SF's number of seats to 16, was very disappointing, even though the party became a part of a coalition government for the first time.

On 7 September 2012, amid criticism that he had neglected his role as party leader since assuming the position of Minister of Foreign Affairs (see below), Søvndal announced that he would resign as party leader, so that his successor would have time to get comfortable in the job. At this point, polls showed that SF would receive only 11 seats in a parliamentary election.

On 13 October 2012, Annette Vilhelmsen defeated Astrid Krag in an election for party leader.

=== Minister of Foreign Affairs ===
Søvndal served as Minister of Foreign Affairs from 3 October 2011 to December 2013. In this capacity he met in May 2012 with U.S. Secretary of State Hillary Clinton, where they announced Denmark's intention to contribute to the Afghan National Security Force, as well as to help complete the transition of power by the end of 2014; agreed on strengthening the U.S.-Danish partnership to prevent and counter terrorism in East Africa; and discussed the potential for stronger cooperation on promoting green growth.

Søvndal called in September 2012 for a reorganization of Danish assignments abroad, saying he wanted more focus on exports to China, India, Brazil, and other growth markets and less on the EU. He also looked to an increased emphasis on the Arctic, human rights, and green growth. "In a rapidly changing world we must constantly ask ourselves whether we are focusing on the right places and in the right way", Søvndal said.

Speaking in February 2012 to the European Parliament, he praised the Arab League for its "strong leadership role...in the Syrian crisis". At a commemoration of the Day of Remembrance for victims of terrorist attacks in March 2012, Søvndal stressed that what is important is "countering terrorism" while "respecting human rights". In November 2012, he pledged Danish support to the Syrian rebels. He announced in February 2013 that Denmark would continue to work for the release of Danish-Bahraini human rights activist Abdulhadi Al-Khawaja, who was in prison in Bahrain, and called on that country to end its mistreatment of young demonstrators. In the same month he condemned North Korea's atomic-bomb test.

In October 2013 Søvndal suffered a heart attack and announced that he would be stepping down as both minister of foreign affairs and as member of the Folketing.

== Controversies ==
=== Remarks about Hizb-ut-Tahrir ===
In 2008, Søvndal spoke out on his blog against the radical Islamic group Hizb-ut-Tahrir, calling its members "fools" with "lunatic views" and telling them that if they really want to live in the caliphate or under sharia, they had "come to the wrong country. They have nothing to do in Denmark, and they will not achieve their goals". He suggested that they move to Iran or Saudi Arabia, and added: "Your benighted state of idiocy has no place on earth". As for those who are attracted to HuT because they have experienced difficulties in life, he wrote: "Get out of the role of victim. Get out of the Middle Ages. Have the courage to use your common sense". Ordinary Danes, he said, "are sick and tired of Hizb-ut-Tahrir and its grotesque and insane demonstrations. That’s how most of us feel. And I am one of them!”

=== Muhammed cartoon crisis ===
After Iran demanded in February 2008 that Danish authorities apologize for the republication of the Muhammed cartoons, nine members of the Danish parliament canceled a scheduled trip to that country. Søvndal supported their decision, saying, "We are not the ones to apologise....If anyone needs to apologise for freedom of speech, human rights, imprisonments, executions and lack of democracy, it is the Iranians".

=== English skills ===
The Copenhagen Post reported in January 2012 that "politicians, commentators and the hoi polloi" were in a "tizzy" over Søvndal's poor English, which had been "satirised on YouTube and ridiculed on newspaper chatboards", with opposition politicians offering "patronising suggestions that he should sharpen up his English act – pronto".

== Israel-Palestine policies ==
Søvndal has been widely accused of being anti-Israeli and is a supporter of the two-state solution. During the 2011 election campaign he at first called for full U.N. membership for Palestine, but later changed his position to be in accord with official Danish policy. After becoming Foreign Minister, he was criticized in December 2011 for having refused to meet Israel's ambassador to Denmark, even though he has already met with representatives of pro-Palestinian groups B’Tselem and Al-Haq.

He told Politiken in March 2012 that the Palestine territories would be receiving 120 million kroner in Danish aid over the next three years. He called on the Palestinians to stop shooting rockets into Israel, and said he expected that the Palestinian Authority would use the Danish funds to build their state and improve security. In May 2012, he called for separate labeling of products from the Palestinian territories.

At a meeting of Nordic foreign ministers in October 2012, he expressed the view that Israeli settlements were the "greatest obstacle to a two-state solution", it was also announced that the Nordic countries had agreed to upgrade Palestinian representation in their capitals. Also in November 2012, he was pressured by other members of his party to vote to give Palestine "non-member observer state" status at the U.N.

After Palestine's U.N. status was upgraded, Israel responded by expanding the building of settlements, an act that Søvndal denounced as "illegal". Denmark was one of several countries that withdrew their ambassadors from Israel in reaction to this move.

== Opinions ==
Søvndal supported the Iraq War at the start, but later changed his mind and became perhaps the war's most vocal opponent in Denmark.

He has said that his role model is Nelson Mandela, "who despite torture, persecution and years of imprisonment retained his humanity and dignity" and was able to "provide leadership for the necessary reconciliation after the brutal apartheid regime". In Denmark, his role model is Gert Petersen, who was chairman of the SF when he first joined the party. "Gert was a sharp and rigorous debater who stood steadfast in his ideals of democracy, equality and solidarity" and who "had a great appeal to both the young idealist, the unskilled working class and the progressive scholar".

== Personal life ==
He was first married to Laila Rifbjerg, with whom he had three children and later divorced from. For several years thereafter he lived with his fellow party member Pernille Frahm, but in 2007 he returned to Rifbjerg, and in 2008 they were remarried, only to be divorced again in 2010. On 23 November 2011, it was reported that Søvndal had secretly married Heidi Perto, who is 18 years his junior. He and Perto live with her daughter in Sønder Bjert.

His daughter Anna Sofie Rifbjerg Søvndal became the local chairman of the Socialist People's Youth (SFU) in Kolding in 2007.

His favorite album is Pink Floyd's The Wall. He also enjoys Sting and the Danish artists Allan Olsen and Johnny Madsen.

Following his heart attack in 2013, Sønvdal quit smoking.

Political offices
Preceded by Lene Espersen	Minister of Foreign Affairs; 2011–2013	Succeeded by Holger K. Nielsen
Preceded by Radosław Sikorski	President of the Council of the European Union; 2012	Succeeded by Erato Kozakou-Marcoullis
Party political offices
Preceded by Holger K. Nielsen	Leader of the Danish Socialist People's Party; 2005–2012	Succeeded by Annette Vilhelmsen
