= Annette Vilhelmsen =

Danish politician (born 1959)

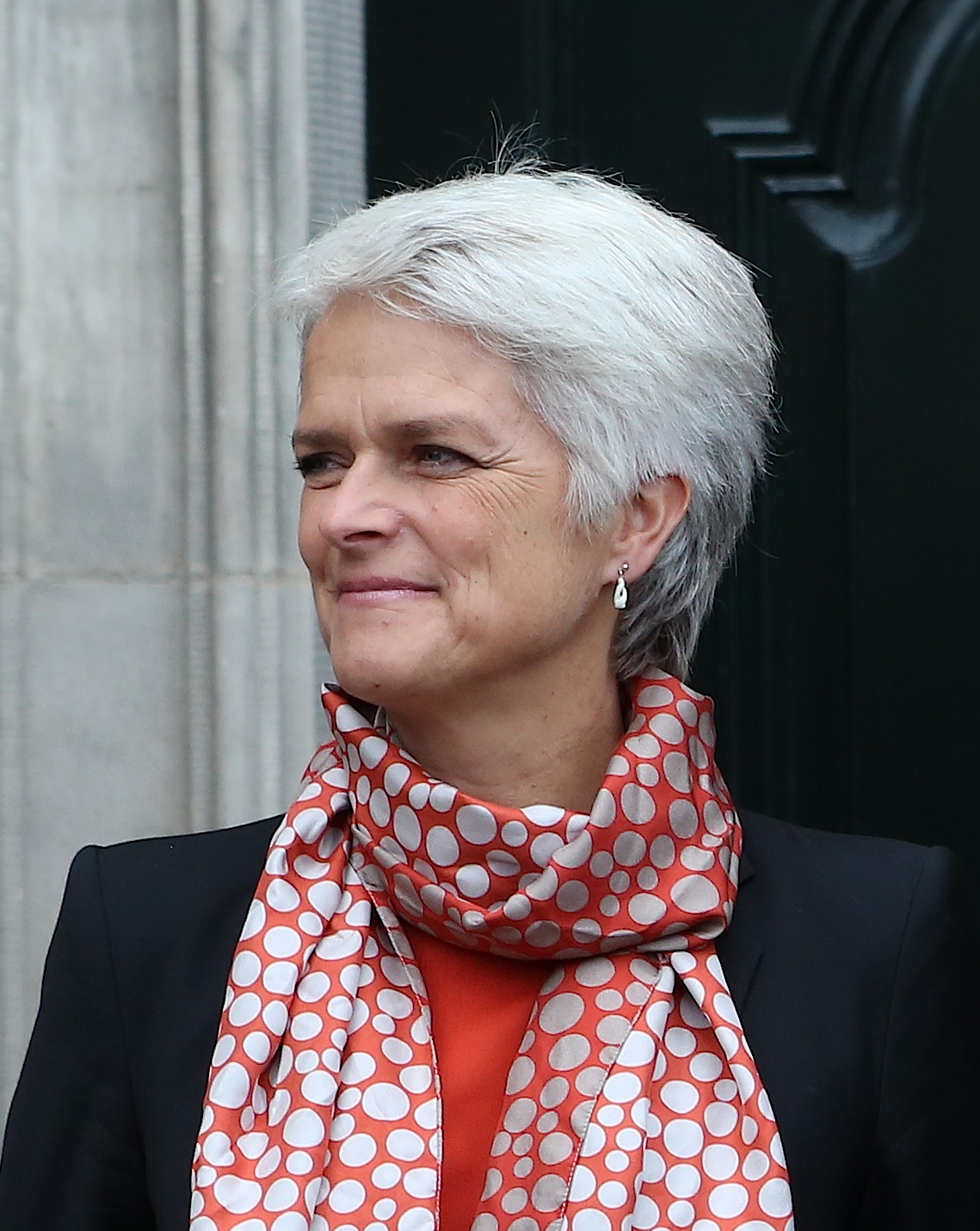
- Annette Vilhelmsen in 2012

Minister for Social Affairs and Integration
- In office 9 August 2013 – 3 February 2014
- Prime Minister: Helle Thorning-Schmidt
- Preceded by: Karen Hækkerup
- Succeeded by: Manu Sareen

Minister of Economic and Business Affairs
- In office 16 October 2012 – 9 August 2013
- Prime Minister: Helle Thorning-Schmidt
- Preceded by: Ole Sohn
- Succeeded by: Henrik Sass Larsen

Leader of the Socialist People's Party
- In office 13 October 2012 – 13 February 2014
- Preceded by: Villy Søvndal
- Succeeded by: Pia Olsen Dyhr

Member of Parliament
- In office 15 September 2011 – 18 June 2015

Personal details
- Born: 24 October 1959 (age 66) Svendborg, Denmark
- Party: Socialist People's Party
- Spouse: John Vilhelmsen

Annette Lilja Vilhelmsen (born 24 October 1959) is a Danish politician who served as chairperson of the Socialist People's Party from 2012 to 2014. She served as Minister for Social Affairs and Integration from August 2013 to February 2014 and Minister for Economic and Business Affairs from 2012 to 2013 in the first cabinet of Helle Thorning-Schmidt. She was a member of Folketing from 2011 to 2015.

== Political career ==
Born in Svendborg, she was educated as a teacher and had a long career in teaching combined with local politics before entering the national political scene when she was elected to Parliament in the 2011 elections. She became her party's spokeswoman for Business related issues.

In September 2012 she announced her candidacy for the post as head of the Socialist People's Party running against Astrid Krag after the previous leader Villy Søvndal stepped down. Vilhelmsen is said to represent the party's left wing. While most of the party leadership voiced their support for Krag and warned that Vilhelmsen's leftist line might endanger the stability of the government coalition, Vilhelmsen achieved considerable support in the general constituency of the party, and won the election with 66% of the vote.

On 16 October 2012 she was named new Minister of Economic and Business Affairs succeeding Ole Sohn. She retracted from both her post as Minister and chairman of the party on 30 January 2014 following lack of support from the party grassroots in the high-profile case of selling part of Danish energy company DONG to American Goldman-Sachs.

Political offices
Preceded by Villy Søvndal	Leader of the Socialist People's Party; 2012—2014	Succeeded by Pia Olsen Dyhr
