= Christine Antorini =

Danish politician (born 1965)

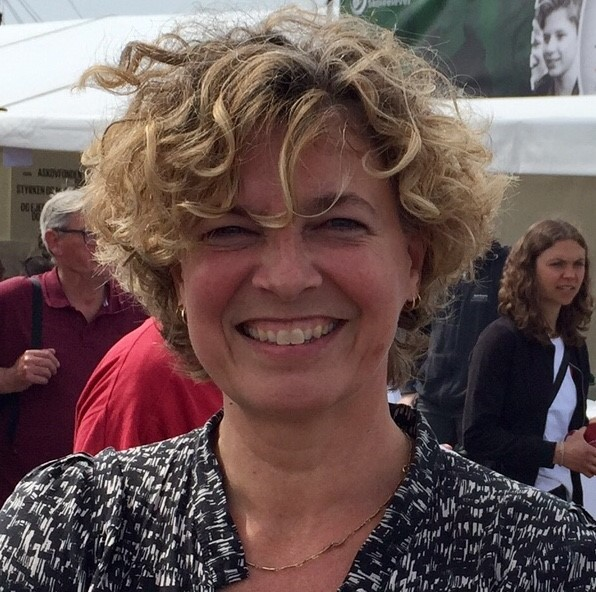
- Antorini in 2017

Minister of Education
- In office 3 October 2011 – 28 June 2015
- Prime Minister: Helle Thorning-Schmidt
- Preceded by: Troels Lund Poulsen
- Succeeded by: Ellen Trane Nørby

Member of the Folketing
- In office 8 February 2005 – 5 September 2018
- Constituency: North Zealand (2011–2018); Copenhagen (2007–2011); Søndre (2005–2007)
- In office 18 March 1998 – 30 November 1999
- Constituency: Østre

Personal details
- Born: 23 May 1965 (age 61) Jyllinge, Denmark
- Party: Social Democrats (2002–present)
- Other political affiliations: Socialist People's Party (1981–2001)
- Spouse(s): Henrik Dahl (m. 2003; div. 2008) Jan Krøyer (m. 2020)
- Education: Aarhus University; Roskilde University

Christine Edda Antorini (born 23 May 1965) is a Danish politician for the Social Democrats, formerly for the Socialist People's Party. From 2011 to 2015 she was the Minister of Education in the Cabinet of Helle Thorning-Schmidt. She was a member of the Folketing from 1998 to 1999 and again from 2005 to 2018.

== Background ==
Antorini was born in Jyllinge, near Copenhagen, where her mother was a teacher and her father a dairyman. Her mother was of Swiss Italian descent and Antorini was brought up in the Catholic faith.

She studied political science at Aarhus University 1985-1987 and public administration at Roskilde University 1989-1994, obtaining a Candidate degree. She headed the secretariat of an independent office for consumer information 1999-2003, was anchorwoman in Danish Radio 2003-2004 and worked for the Union of Commercial and Clerical Employees, part of Danish Confederation of Trade Unions, 2004-2005.

After leaving politics, from 2018 to 2023 she was manager of LIFE Fonden, a foundation that promotes the knowledge of natural sciences and technology among children. From 2023, she enrolled in the study to become a nurse.

== Political career ==
Antorini was a member of the executive board of the Youth of the Socialist People's Party became a member of the executive board for the Socialist People's Party in 1988. In 1991, she became deputy leader for the party, a position she held to 1998. From 1998 to 1999 she was a member of the Folketing for the Socialist People's Party from Eastern Copenhagen electoral district.

She was elected again to the Folketing in the general election, 2005, this time representing the Social Democrats and subsequently re-elected in the 2007 election and the 2011 election. She was among other things the Social Democrats' spokesperson on education. The 2011 election brought the Social Democrats to power in a coalition cabinet led by Helle Thorning-Schmidt. Antorini was named Minister of Children and Education 3 October 2011, with the inclusion of children in the Minister of Education's portfolio being a novelty. In a cabinet reshuffle on 9 August 2013, the position was again called Minister of Education. She has been a member of a number of committees, boards and think-thanks; several related to education and science.

Christine Antorini was one of two Danish nominees for EU Commissioner in August 2014.

== Personal life ==
Antorini is twice divorced. She has two children from her first marriage. Her second marriage was to sociologist Henrik Dahl.

== Bibliography ==
- Borgerlige ord efter revolutionen (co-author), Gyldendal, 1999
- Det ny systemskifte (co-author), Gyldendal, 2001
- Fanatisme eller Idealisme, Forum, 2003,
- Epostler (co-author), Gyldendal, 2003
- Fremtidens partier, Gyldendal, 2008.

Political offices
Preceded by Troels Lund Poulsen	Minister of Education; 2011–2015	Succeeded by Ellen Trane Nørby
