= Mette Gjerskov =

Danish politician (1966–2023)

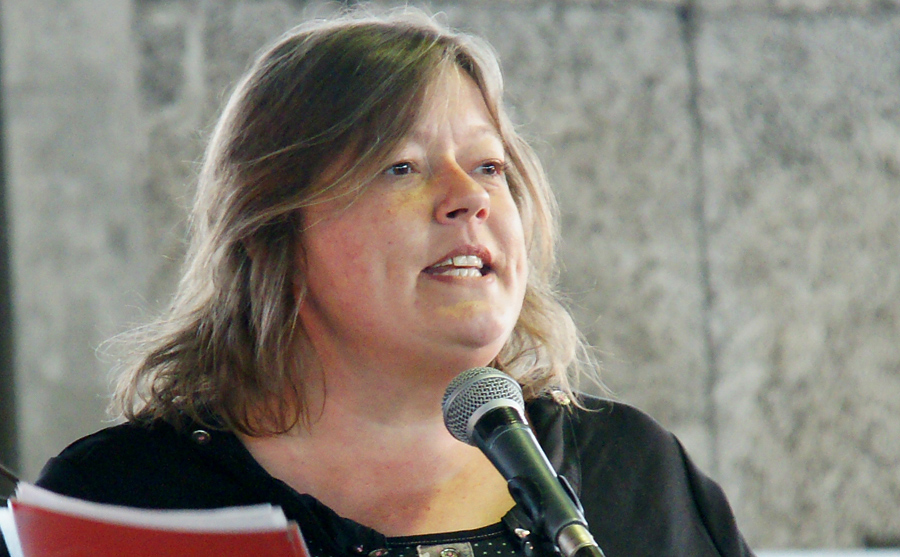

Member of the Folketing
- In office 8 February 2005 – 12 June 2023
- Constituency: Zealand (2007-2023); Roskilde (2005-2007)

Minister for Food, Agriculture and Fisheries
- In office 3 October 2011 – 9 August 2013
- Prime Minister: Helle Thorning-Schmidt
- Preceded by: Henrik Høegh
- Succeeded by: Karen Hækkerup

Personal details
- Born: 28 July 1966 Gundsø, Denmark
- Died: 12 June 2023 (aged 56)
- Party: Social Democrats
- Education: Royal Veterinary and Agricultural University

Mette Gjerskov (28 July 1966 – 12 June 2023) was a Danish politician, who was a member of the Folketing for the Social Democrats political party. She was elected into parliament at the 2005 Danish general election. She served as minister for Food, Agriculture and Fisheries.

== Background ==
Gjerskov finished her studies as an agronomist at the Royal Veterinary and Agricultural University in 1993. Before this she studied mathematics, physics and chemistry at an evening school for adults in Ballerup.

== Political career ==
Gjerskov worked as a civil servant of the minister of Agriculture from 1995 to 2004. She was elected as deputy of Folketing for the 2005 election. After central-left and left won the election on 15 September 2011, she was nominated as the minister of food, agriculture and fisheries in the cabinet of Helle Thorning-Schmidt. Gjerskov lost her ministry to Karen Hækkerup after the cabinet reshuffle of 9 August 2013.

== Death ==
On 12 June 2023, Mette Gjerskov died age 56 from nerve inflammation. On 7 September that year, the Folketing held a memorial session with a minute's silence in honour of her. She's buried at Gundsømagle Church.

Political offices
Preceded by Henrik Høegh	Minister for Food, Agriculture and Fisheries; 2011-2013	Succeeded by Karen Hækkerup
