= Karen Hækkerup =

Danish politician (born 1974)

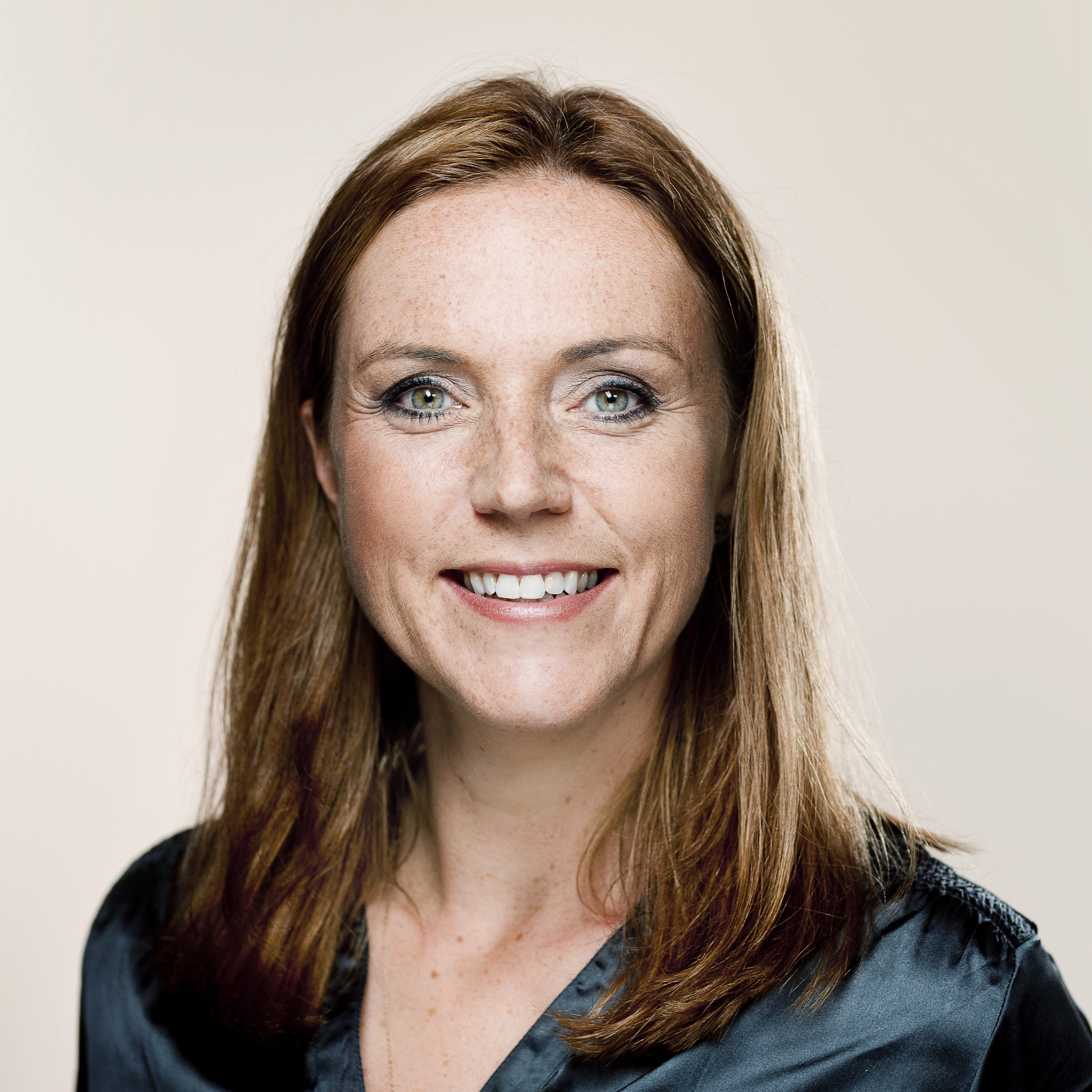

Minister of Justice
- In office 12 December 2013 – 10 October 2014
- Prime Minister: Helle Thorning-Schmidt
- Preceded by: Morten Bødskov
- Succeeded by: Mette Frederiksen

Minister of Food, Agriculture and Fisheries
- In office 9 August 2013 – 12 December 2013
- Prime Minister: Helle Thorning-Schmidt
- Preceded by: Mette Gjerskov
- Succeeded by: Dan Jørgensen

Minister of Social Affairs and Integration
- In office 3 October 2011 – 9 August 2013
- Prime Minister: Helle Thorning-Schmidt
- Preceded by: Benedikte Kiær
- Succeeded by: Annette Vilhelmsen

Personal details
- Born: 12 June 1974 (age 51) Hillerød, Denmark
- Party: Social Democrats

Karen Angelo Hækkerup (née Schmidt; born 12 June 1974) is a Danish politician representing the Social Democrats. She was Justice Minister of Denmark from 12 December 2013 to 10 October 2014. Hækkerup resigned her post as Justice Minister in favour of a job as CEO of the Danish Agriculture and Food Council, the largest lobby organisation for the Danish agricultural industry.

Political offices
Preceded by Benedikte Kiær	Minister of Social Affairs and Integration; 2011–2013	Succeeded by Annette Vilhelmsen
Preceded by Mette Gjerskov	Minister of Food, Agriculture and Fisheries; 2013	Succeeded by Dan Jørgensen
Preceded by Morten Bødskov	Minister of Justice; 2013–2014	Succeeded by Mette Frederiksen
