= Astrid Krag =

Danish politician (born 1982)

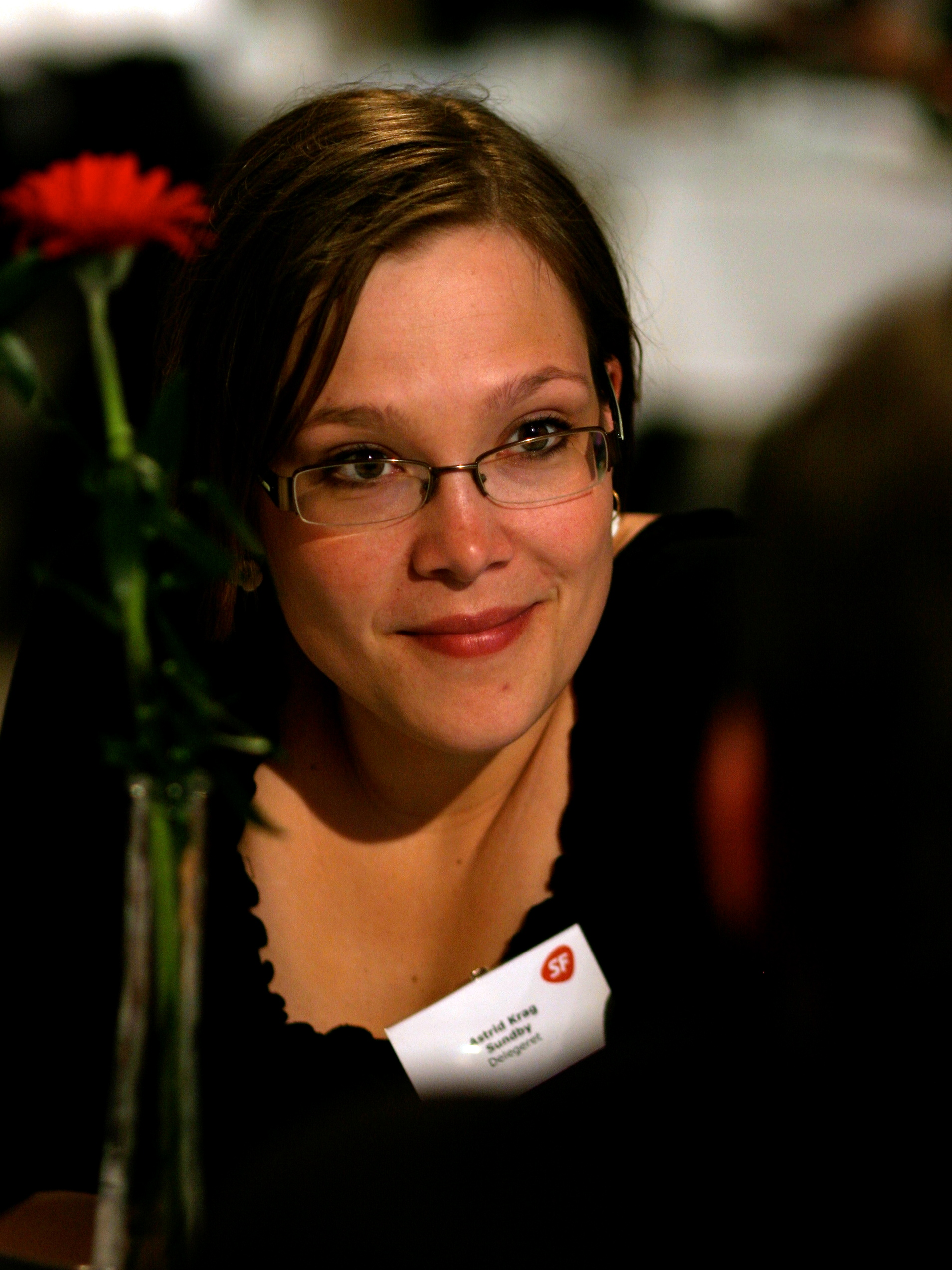
- Astrid Krag at the SF party convention in 2010.

Minister of Social and Elderly Affairs
- In office 21 January 2021 – 15 December 2022
- Prime Minister: Mette Frederiksen
- Preceded by: Herself (Social Affairs and the Interior)
- Succeeded by: Pernille Rosenkrantz-Theil

Minister of Social Affairs and the Interior
- In office 27 June 2019 – 21 January 2021
- Prime Minister: Mette Frederiksen
- Preceded by: Ellen Trane Nørby
- Succeeded by: Kaare Dybvad

Minister of Health and Prevention
- In office 3 October 2011 – 3 February 2014
- Prime Minister: Helle Thorning-Schmidt
- Preceded by: Bertel Haarder
- Succeeded by: Nick Hækkerup

Member of the Folketing
- Incumbent
- Assumed office 13 November 2007
- Constituency: Zealand

Personal details
- Born: 17 November 1982 (age 43) Vejle, Denmark
- Party: Social Democrats
- Other political affiliations: Socialist People's Party
- Spouse: Andreas Seebach

Astrid Krag (born 17 November 1982) is a Danish politician, who is a member of the Folketing for the Social Democrats political party. She served as the Minister of Social Affairs and the Interior in the Cabinet of Mette Frederiksen. She previously served as Minister of Health and Prevention in the Cabinet of Helle Thorning-Schmidt from October 2011 until January 2014.

She was a part of the SF youth movement since her high school years at Tørring Amtsgymnasium. She studied political science at the University of Copenhagen from 2003 to 2007, and in November 2007 she was elected to parliament. She lives on Amager, is married to musician Andreas Seebach with whom she has a daughter and two sons.

== Political career ==
She was elected to the Danish Parliament in 2007. During her time as a member of parliament she was spokesperson for the Socialist People's Party on the topics of immigration, citizenship and elder care. She has been noted as a supporter of a somewhat stricter immigration policy, than the party has previously pursued.

She had been described as a member of the party's right wing, but described herself as a "reform socialist", in the pragmatic center of the party. When leader of the Socialist People's Party Villy Søvndal announced that he would step down in September 2012, she announced her candidacy as new leader, and garnered supporting statements from most of the party top. Her opponent in the bid for party leadership was Annette Vilhelmsen, of the party's left wing, who won with 64% percent of the votes.

In January 2014 as the Socialist People's Party left the government coalition, Astrid Krag left the People's party to become a member of the ruling Social Democratic Party.

On 27 June 2019, she became Minister of Social Affairs and the Interior in the Frederiksen Cabinet.

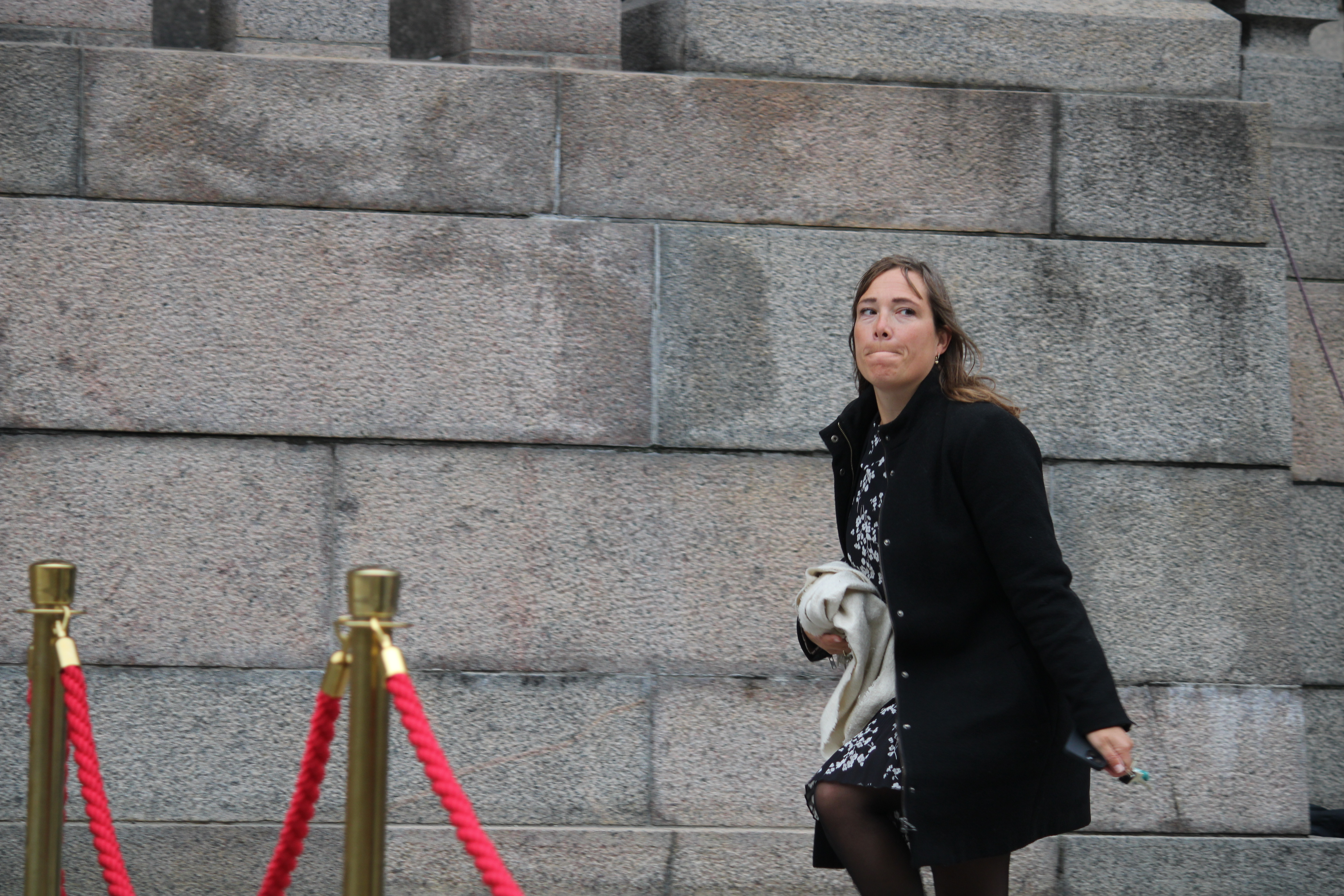
Krag at the 2025 opening of parliament

On 20 February 2025, she announced that she will leave politics and not stand for reelection in the upcoming Folketing elections.

Political offices
Preceded by Bertel Haarder	Minister of Health; 2011–2014	Succeeded by Nick Hækkerup
Preceded by Mai Mercado	Minister of Social Affairs; 2019–	Succeeded by Incumbent
Preceded by Simon Emil Ammitzbøll-Bille	Minister of the Interior; 2019–2021	Succeeded by Kaare Dybvad
Preceded by Magnus Heunicke	Minister for Elderly Affairs; 2021–	Succeeded by Incumbent
