= Thyra Frank =

Danish nurse and politician (born 1952)

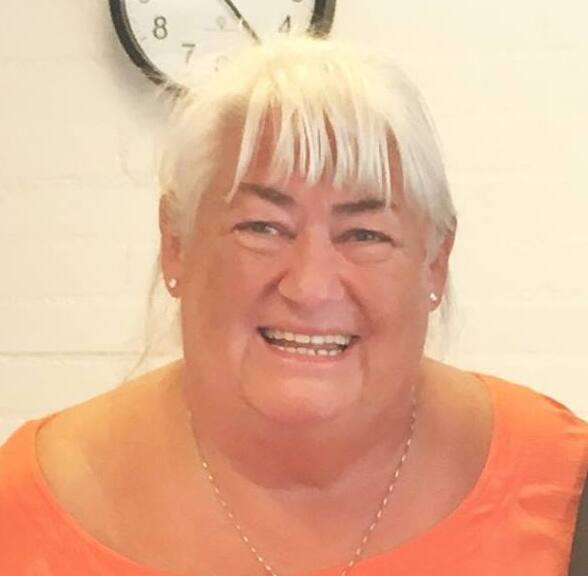

Member of Parliament
- In office 2011–2015

Minister for Elderly Affairs
- In office 28 November 2016 – 27 June 2019
- Prime Minister: Lars Løkke Rasmussen

Personal details
- Born: 10 May 1952 (age 73) Skørping, Denmark
- Party: Liberal Alliance (Denmark)
- Occupation: Nurse and politician
- Awards: Order of the Dannebrog (2008)

Thyra Frank (born 10 May 1952) is a Danish nurse and politician.

She was born in Skørping to Jens Kristian Frank and Anna Nystrup Frank, and is married to Peter Camillo Rasmussen. She was elected member of Folketinget for the Liberal Alliance from 2011 to 2015. She was appointed Minister for Elderly Affairs in the third cabinet of Lars Løkke Rasmussen from 28 November 2016 to 27 June 2019.

Frank was decorated Knight of the Order of the Dannebrog in 2008.
