= Nicolai Wammen =

Danish politician

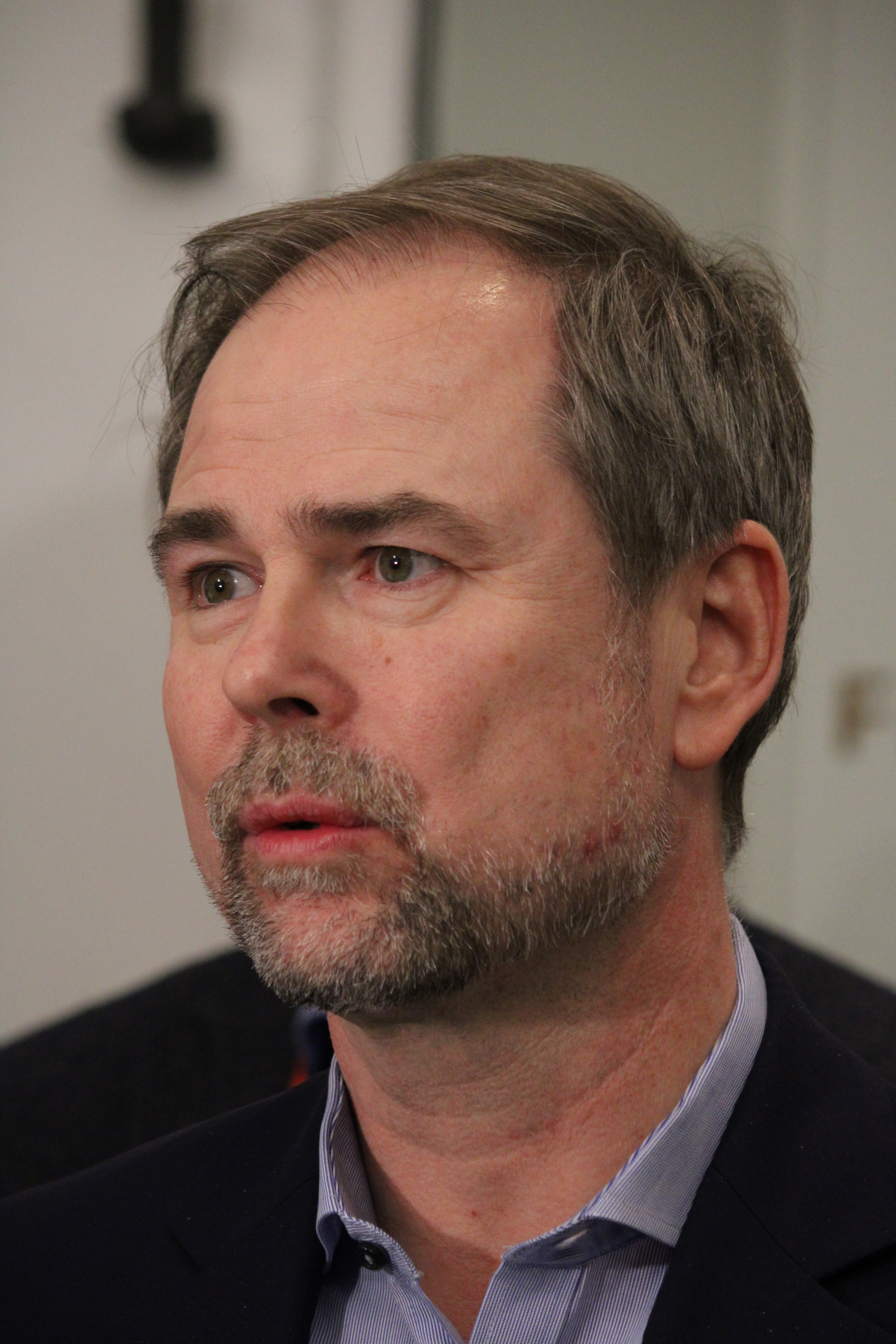
- Wammen in 2025

Minister of Justice
- Incumbent
- Assumed office 3 June 2026
- Prime Minister: Mette Frederiksen
- Preceded by: Peter Hummelgaard

Minister for Finance
- In office 27 June 2019 – 3 June 2026
- Prime Minister: Mette Frederiksen
- Preceded by: Kristian Jensen
- Succeeded by: Peter Hummelgaard

Minister for Defence
- In office 9 August 2013 – 28 June 2015
- Prime Minister: Helle Thorning-Schmidt
- Preceded by: Nick Hækkerup
- Succeeded by: Carl Holst

Minister of European Affairs
- In office 3 October 2011 – 9 August 2013
- Prime Minister: Helle Thorning-Schmidt
- Preceded by: Office established
- Succeeded by: Nick Hækkerup

Mayor of Aarhus Municipality
- In office 1 January 2006 – 10 August 2011
- Preceded by: Louise Gade
- Succeeded by: Jacob B. Johansen

Member of the Folketing
- Incumbent
- Assumed office 15 September 2011
- Constituency: East Jutland
- In office 20 November 2001 – 8 February 2005
- Constituency: Århus

Personal details
- Born: 7 February 1971 (age 55) Holbæk, Denmark
- Party: Social Democrats
- Education: Aarhus University

Nicolai Halby Wammen (born 7 February 1971) is a Danish politician of the Social Democrats who has been serving as Minister for Finance in the government of Prime Minister Mette Frederiksen since 2019. A native and lifelong resident of Denmark's second-largest city, Aarhus, he served as mayor from 2006 to 2011. On the national level, he has served as Minister of European Affairs (2011–2013) and as Minister of Defence (2013–2015).

== Political career ==
=== Early beginnings ===
While studying, Wammen became the chairman of the university’s Social Democrat organisation, Frit Forum., and was first elected to the Aarhus City Council in 1998. In the 2001 elections, he was elected to Parliament and served one term. After almost a full term as the party’s shadow finance minister, he pulled out of national politics and was then elected Mayor of Aarhus in 2006. At this time he was also elected vice president of the Social Democrats.

=== Career in national politics ===
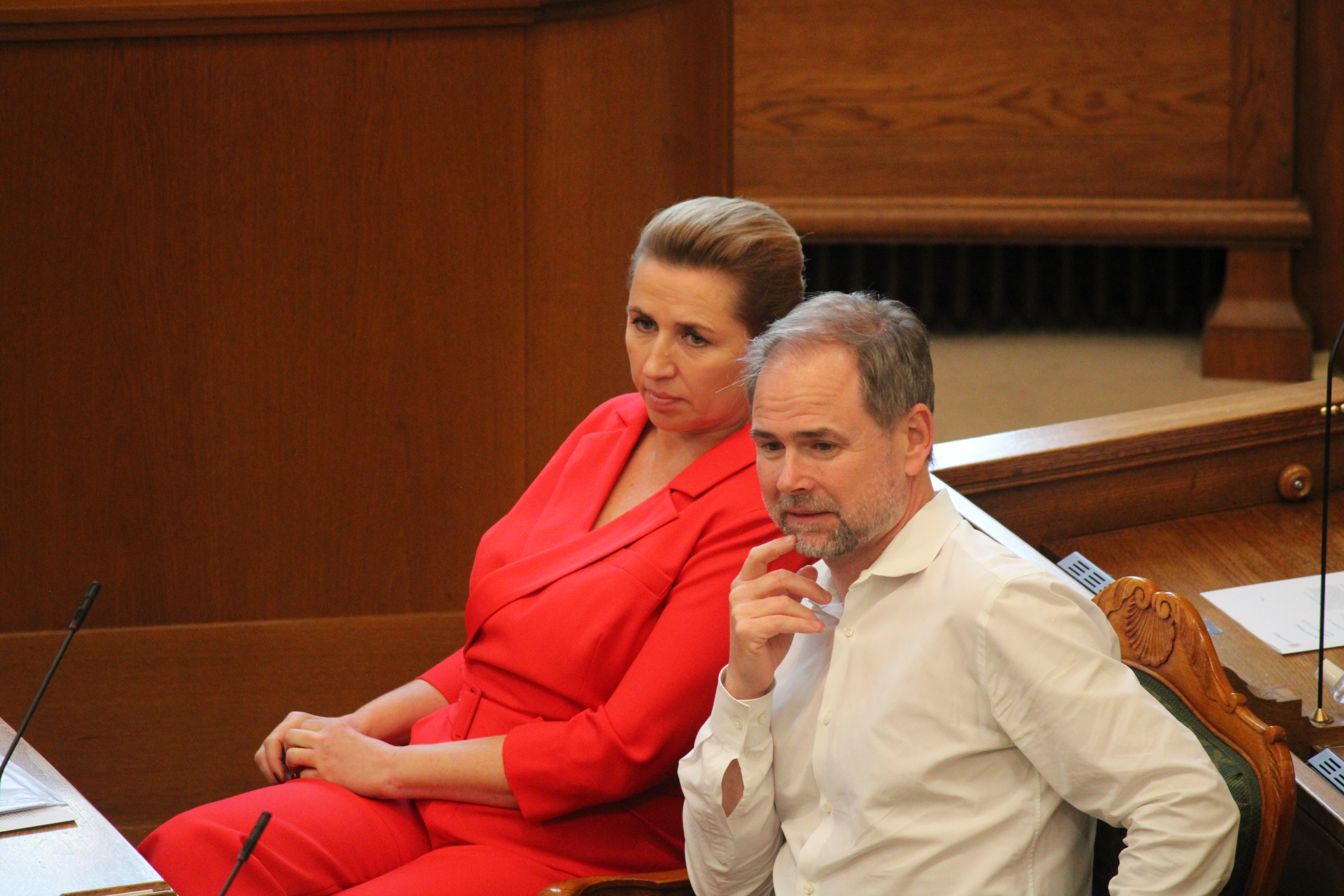
Wammen in parliament with prime minister Mette Frederiksen, 2025

When Helle Thorning-Schmidt led the Social Democrats to victory in Denmark's 2011 elections, Wammen returned to Danish Parliament (representing Aarhus), securing the fifth-highest number of personal votes. He was appointed to the newly created position of Minister of European Affairs in the cabinet of Prime Minister Helle Thorning-Schmidt; he held the office from October 2011 to August 2013. In this capacity, he chaired the meetings of the General Affairs Council when Denmark held the rotating presidency of the Council of the European Union in 2012.

On 9 August 2013, Prime Minister Thorning-Schmidt announced her first cabinet reshuffle, changing six ministers, including moving Wammen to Minister for Defence, and moving Minister of Defence Nick Hækkerup to Minister of European Affairs and Trade.

Under his leadership as Minister of Finance, the parliament approved a cash handout to the elderly and other measures totalling 3.1 billion Danish crowns ($439 million) to cushion the impact of soaring inflation and high energy prices in 2022.

== Personal life ==
After a year and a half studying law, Wammen switched to political science, and earned a master's degree from the University of Aarhus in 2001.

Wammen is currently married to Karen Lund, and was formerly engaged with Mai Mercado, and Kirsten Brosbøl.

In 2011 Danish newspaper Ekstra Bladet reported that Wammen fathered a son, Carl, (born 9 October 2011) with Julie Rademacher, a former member of the Parliament whom the paper described as "a friend". Upon the birth of their son, she resigned from Parliament and moved to Greenland to be with her parents.

Political offices
Preceded by Kristian Jensen	Minister for Finance; 2019–	Succeeded by Incumbent
Preceded by Nick Hækkerup	Minister of Defence; 2013–2015	Succeeded by Carl Holst
Preceded by Bertel Haarder	Minister of European Affairs; 2011–2013	Succeeded by Nick Hækkerup
