= Sanjay Shah =

British businessman

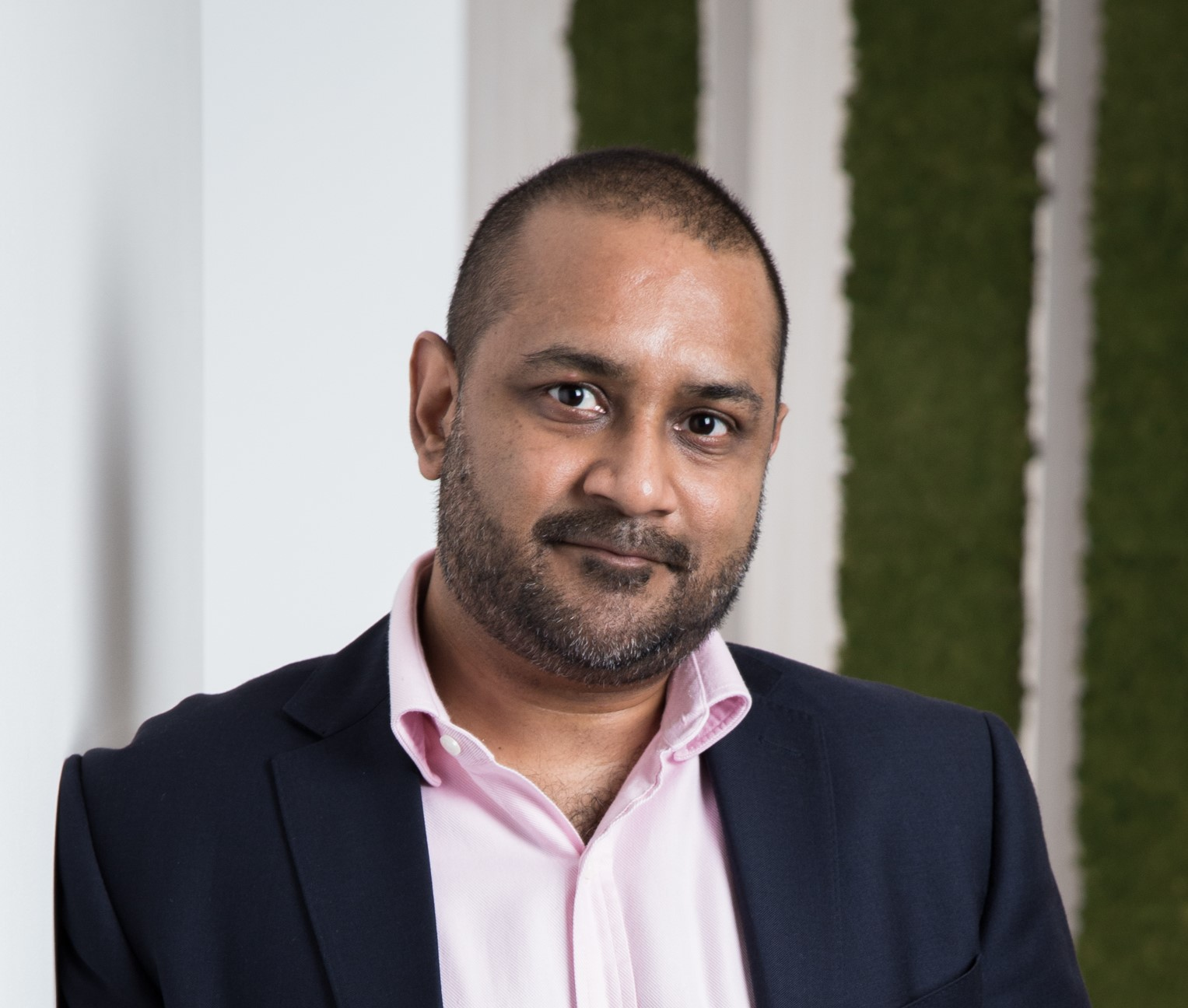
- Shah in 2016
- Born: 11 September 1970 (age 55)
- Citizenship: British
- Occupation: Trader

Sanjay Shah (born 11 September 1970) is a British trader who was sentenced by a Danish court in 2024 to 12 years in prison for tax fraud, the heaviest penalty ever handed out in Denmark for a fraud case. He has appealed the verdict.

Shah founded Solo Capital, a hedge fund firm in Britain which closed in 2016, and the NGO Autism Rocks, which closed in 2020.

Shah was ordered to pay back sums of money in May 2023 by the Dubai courts but has appealed since waiting for his UK trial to finish in a case regarding the Danish Government being allegedly defrauded of 12.7 billion DKK (1.65 billion euros) between 2012 and 2015. This was part of the CumEx-Files involving multiple European nations and involves a number of the world's largest banks such as Barclays, Merrill Lynch, JP Morgan, Morgan Stanley, BNP Paribas, Banco Santander, Macquarie Bank and Deutsche Bank.

Shah admitted his company enabled clients to claim around DKK 8 billion from the Ministry of Taxation. He claimed that he was only using legal tax loopholes, where dividend income is taxed differently in various jurisdictions. Shah was extradited to Denmark in December 2023 to face trial. In December 2024, he was sentenced to 12 years in jail for tax fraud.

In February 2025, Shah was charged in Germany over CumEx deals. The government alleged a loss to the German treasury of €46.5 million in 2010.

== Career ==
Shah worked as a banker for Morgan Stanley, Credit Suisse and Rabobank "over a period of almost 20 years and – after finding himself unemployed in 2008 – set up his own investment management, brokerage and principal trading business".

== Solo Capital ==
Shah founded the hedge fund firm Solo Capital (Solo Capital Partners LLP) in London, which employed "more than 100 financial experts across offices in London and Dubai". It was founded in 2009, with an office of eight employees. Shah started the firm after the trading desk he was previously working at Rabobank closed its dividend arbitrage desk due to the 2008 financial crisis.

Solo Capital worked with over 200 Americans who owned the self-directed pension plans to take advantage of a 27% withheld tax refund for US pension funds holding Danish stocks. Solo Capital ran this trade between 2012 and 2015. The Danish tax authority claims the refunds were fraudulent. In 2014, the Danish tax authorities paid over 1,500 tax refund applications worth $590 million. In 2015, the Danish tax authorities paid over 2,500 tax refund applications worth $1.2 billion. Most of these were for Solo Capital clients.

It was closed in 2015 while it was being investigated by Danish tax authorities for tax fraud.

In 2016, its London offices were raided by the National Crime Agency. Shah was investigated in regards to tax fraud and Solo Capital closed in 2016, amid the investigation by Danish authorities, while his London home and offices were raided by the British National Crime Agency, and Varengold Bank (co-owned by Shah) was raided by German authorities.

== Danish dividend tax fraud charges ==
In 2010, in an audit report, the Danish Ministry of Taxation was found to have ignored warnings on multiple occasions of a legal tax loophole concerning dividend tax. This was two years before Sanjay Shah's company Solo Capital enabled clients to be paid more than 8 billion DKK in tax refunds. In June 2018, Denmark's Ministry of Taxation filed a civil claim in the UK High Court of Justice, claiming it had been the victim of fraud, conspiracy, dishonesty and unjust enrichment.

Since 2015, Shah has been the prime suspect in a case regarding the Danish Government being defrauded of 12.7 billion DKK (1.65 billion euros) which was exposed in the CumEx-Files. Shah was investigated in regards to the case in 2015. The tax fraud took place between 2012 and 2015 and is the largest in the history of Denmark. Shah is also the prime suspect in similar alleged tax fraud cases involving more than 200 million euros in Belgium and 65,000 euros (580,000 NOK) in Norway respectively. An additional 300 million euros in Belgium and 40 million euros (350 million NOK) in Norway were only stopped because of warnings from the Danish authorities. In addition, he is being investigated since 2016 by Germany and the UK via Eurojust, and by the US Treasury Department, as it is suspected that some of the money were funnelled through US pension funds.

As of December 2016, about 300 million euros had been seized by the Danish police in cooperation with foreign police forces.

In 2017, two suspected co-conspirators were also charged by the Danish authorities.

In September 2018, a High Court of Justice judge in London entered a $1.3 billion default judgment against two UK companies, Solo Capital Limited and Elysium Global (UK) Limited, which were no longer in Shah's control, at the behest of the Danish tax agency SKAT. The claims against these companies were not defended, hence the default judgment. In the same month, finans.dk, a subsidiary of the Jyllands-Posten newspaper, reported that assets in Elysium Global and Elysium Properties, two of Shah's companies, had been frozen. and that Danish authorities have filed cases against him in the Dubai International Financial Centre Courts as well as the Commercial Court in London.

In 2018, Britain, Germany and the United Arab Emirates had frozen, but not confiscated $660 million in assets belonging to Shah.

In May 2019, a number of American pension funds agreed to return 1.6 billion DKK (239 million USD) in a related tax-fraud case. In September 2019, German North Channel Bank accepted a fine of 110 million DKK for its involvement in a related tax fraud scheme. Shah remains the main suspect in the main tax fraud case.

In September 2019, Danish tax authorities reported that a ruling in Dubai against a 'central player' in the tax fraud case provided access to 9 million documents, of which 3.5 million had already been transferred. Shah's spokesman, Jack Irvine, confirmed that these documents came from Shah. As of September 2019, the total number of Danish indictments against persons and companies involved in the tax fraud scheme had risen to 476 with projected legal costs of 2.4 billion Danish kroner. In May 2020, the Tax Minister Morten Bødskov announced that the fees paid to lawyers was USD350 million, and that 250 new employees had been added to the Tax Office to address massive failures in control.

In November 2019, British and Danish authorities reached an agreement that the main prosecution against Shah should take place in a Danish court of law, and both countries support his extradition from Dubai to Denmark.

As of 2019, Shah has denied any wrongdoing. In papers lodged in London's High Court as part of a civil case brought by the Danish tax authority SKAT. Shah's lawyers rejected the allegations against him.

The Danish Prosecutor interrogated Shah in Abu Dhabi over three days in a voluntary interview in September 2019.

On 12 August 2020, the Dubai Court dismissed the Danish government's claim that it had been defrauded by Sanjay Shah of £1.5 billion (Dh7.2 bn), due to lack of evidence.

In January 2021, Danish prosecutors charged Shah with fraudulently reclaiming $1.6 billion in dividend tax. Prosecutors sought a 12-year sentence due to the severity of case. In April 2021, the United Kingdom Commercial Court dismissed Denmark's claim against Shah, with judge Andrew Baker stating that the charges were "politically as well as financially motivated"; however, the court did not take action on Shah's frozen assets in Great Britain at that time. On 28 February 2022 the Danish government won the appeal case reversing High Courts previous dismissal of the case, with judge Julian Flaux stating that "judge [Baker] fell into error in accepting" the alleged fraud defendants' submission.

On 31 May 2022 Shah was arrested in Dubai to face trial for potential extradition to Denmark. On 12 September 2022 the judge of the case ruled that Shah wouldn't be extradited to Denmark, due to a lack of documents regarding the investigation. The Danish authorities have the ability to appeal the decision.

On 15 September 2022, a Dubai civil court reportedly ruled that Sanjay Shah and other suspects in the Danish dividend tax fraud case return around 8 billion DKK ($1.1 billion) to Denmark.

=== Extradition ===
On 6 December 2023, the United Arab Emirates extradited Shah to Denmark where he was arrested upon landing in Copenhagen Airport. The following day he was presented at grundlovsforhør (transl. interrogation). A judge at the Court of Glostrup ruled Shah to be detained pre-trial until 3 January 2024, at which point his detention would again be decided upon.

=== Trial and Sentencing ===
In March 2024, Shah went to trial in Copenhagen.

In September 2024, Denmark's prosecutor asked the court to sentence Shah to a maximum of 12 years in prison. On December 13, 2024, Sanjay Shah was sentenced to 12 years in prison by a Danish court for his role in a tax fraud scheme that cost the Danish government over £1 billion. This sentence is the longest ever imposed for a financial crime in Danish history.

In February 2024, Anthony Patterson, a British trader hired by Sanjay Shah, admitted in part to charges of complicity in serious fraud, and was sentenced to eight years in prison by a Danish court.

==== Key details of the sentencing ====
- Shah was permanently barred from entering Denmark.
- Assets valued at approximately $1 billion (DKK 7.2 billion) were ordered to be confiscated, including multiple properties.
- The judge, Nanna Blach, stated that Shah played a "central and leading role" in the operation that led to "unjustified" payments.
- Prosecutor Marie Tullin emphasized that the lengthy sentence reflected "the extraordinarily large sum involved, the duration of the scheme, and his management role over several years in perpetrating this fraud against the Danish state".

Shah's attorney Kaare Pihlmann indicated that they would appeal the decision, expressing hope for a more lenient outcome in the High Court. The trial, which lasted several months, focused on Shah's alleged masterminding of a cum-ex scheme between 2012 and 2015. Throughout the proceedings, Shah maintained his innocence, claiming he had exploited a legal loophole rather than committed fraud. This sentencing marks a significant development in the ongoing investigation into cum-ex trading schemes, which have affected several European countries including Germany, Belgium, and Denmark.

=== United Kingdom proceedings ===
In 2025, Denmark’s tax authority (Skat) brought a civil action in the High Court of England and Wales seeking to recover about £1.4 billion in dividend tax refunds that it alleged had been wrongfully obtained through cum-ex trading arrangements involving Sanjay Shah and entities linked to Solo Capital. The case, one of the largest and most complex civil trials heard in the English courts, ran for 138 days and involved 56 defendants.

In October 2025, the High Court dismissed all of Skat's claims. The judge held that although some defendants, including Shah, had acted dishonestly in certain respects, Skat’s internal controls for processing refund claims were so weak that the authority had not legally been misled. Skat announced its intention to seek permission to appeal.

Following the ruling, Skat became liable for the majority of the defendants' legal costs, which court filings indicated could total around £400 million, making the case one of the most expensive civil proceedings in English legal history. Entities associated with Shah were entitled to recover a substantial portion of their costs under the court order.

== German dividend tax fraud charges ==
In February 2025, Shah was charged in Germany over CumEx deals. The government alleged a loss to the German treasury of €46.5 million in 2010.

== Personal life ==
Shah is married and has three children. In 2009, he moved to Dubai "after falling in love with the city". His youngest son, Nikhil, was diagnosed with autism in 2011. After working with therapists and medical experts for three years, he decided to raise awareness about autism and in 2014 founded Autism Rocks. The Centre shut down in February 2020 amidst the tax fraud probe against Shah.

== See also ==
- CumEx-Files
