= Ascory Bank =

German investment bank

Coordinates: 53.544373°N 9.950287°E

Ascory Bank AG
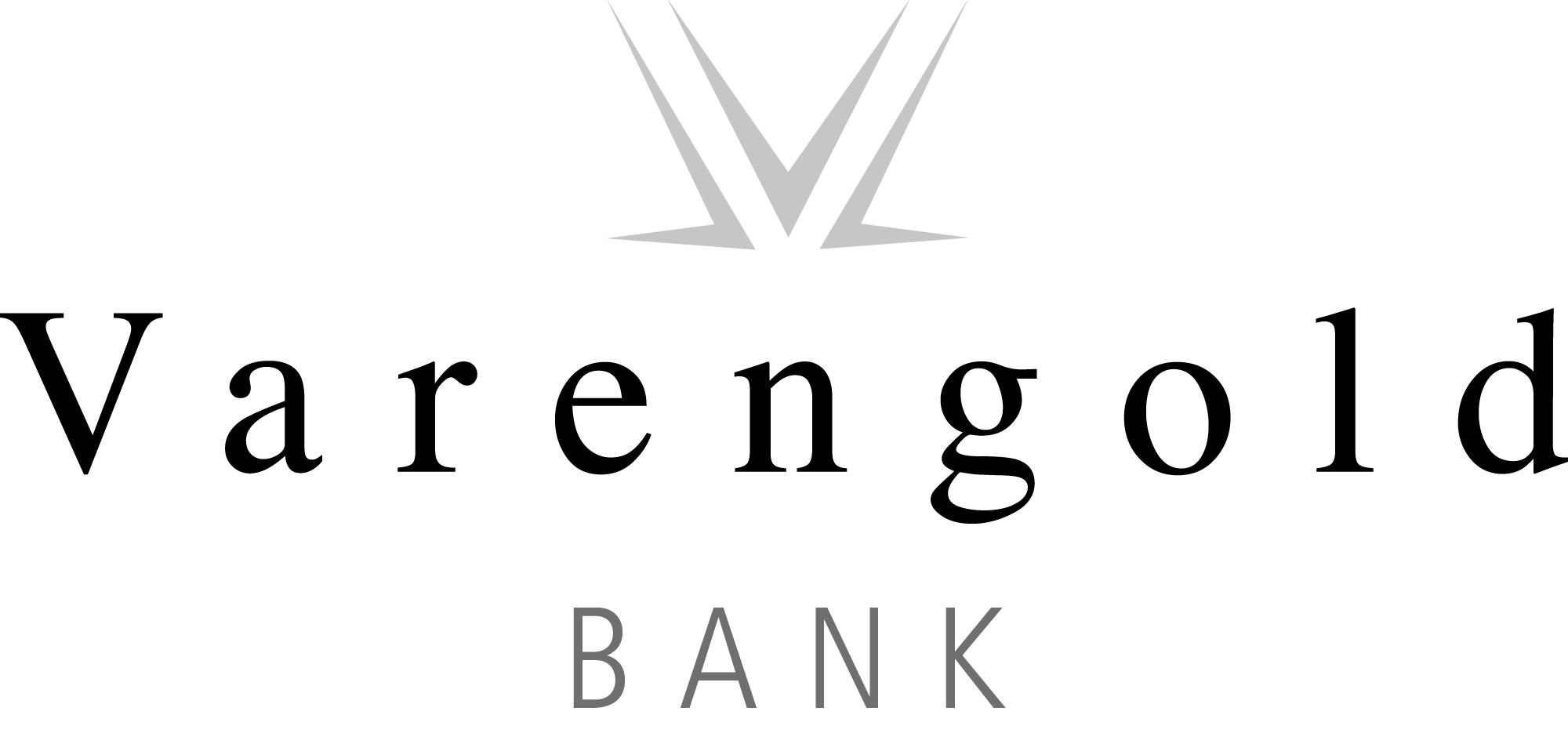
- Type: Public
- Traded as: FWB: VG8
- Industry: Financial services
- Founded: 1995; 31 years ago
- Headquarters: Hamburg, Germany
- Services: Marketplace banking, commercial banking, Trade finance
- Total assets: €503 million (2019)
- Number of employees: 66 (2019)
- Website: www.varengold.de

Ascory Bank AG (formerly Varengold Bank AG) is a German investment bank founded in Hamburg in 1995 that also has offices in London and Sofia.

== History ==
Varengold was founded in Hamburg in 1995 by former derivatives traders led by Yasin Sebastian Qureshi and initially operated as an asset-management and brokerage house; it obtained a full banking licence in 2013. Since the company was founded, the focus of its business activities has initially been on derivatives brokerage and services in the area of alternative investments such providing trading in contracts for difference (CFDs).

In 1998, Varengold was granted a credit institution license by the then Federal Banking Supervisory Office (Bundesaufsichtsamt für das Kreditwesen). In June 2013 Varengold was granted a license as a deposit-taking bank.

Since 20 March 2007, the Varengold shares have been listed in the unofficial market of the Frankfurt Stock Exchange in the Entry Standard market segment. With the discontinuation of the Entry Standard on 1 March 2017, Varengold moved to the Basic Board. In 2018, the company was listed on regional exchanges such as the Börse München.

Seeking growth outside Germany, Varengold opened a representative office in Sofia in 2018 to serve South-Eastern European fintech clients.

== Operations ==
Executives describe the strategy as becoming “the preferred bank for the marketplace-lending industry,” a position highlighted in a 2020 interview about Banking-as-a-Service partnerships.

Alongside fintech funding, the bank historically processed high-margin international payments for trade clients in the Middle East and Eastern Europe, generating fees of almost €45 million in 2021 before later restrictions.

=== Divisions ===
In the marketplace banking division, the bank supports online marketplaces that deal with the financing of companies and consumers (peer-to-peer platforms). Varengold finances the growth of fintech companies and provides them with products requiring a banking license (fronting services). In 2018 it committed £45 million to the UK invoice-finance platform MarketInvoice.

In the transaction banking and commercial banking division, the bank provides foreign trade-oriented customers with basic products such as account relationships and international payment transactions. The bank also has a customer base for trade finance transactions (e.g., guaranties or letters of credit).

Varengold Bank AG is registered with the Federal Financial Supervisory Authority (BaFin) under No. 109520 and is affiliated with the Entschädigungseinrichtung deutscher Banken (EdB). Varengold shares (stock symbol VG8) is listed on the Xetra of the Frankfurt Stock Exchange.

== Criticism ==
The Jerusalem Post reported in October 2018 that Varengold was said to have been doing business with Iran Air at that time despite US sanctions.

The Varengold investment subsidiary was involved in cum-ex transactions. As of 2018, possible claims in the high double-digit millions still burden the bank's balance sheets. The public prosecutor's office in Cologne is investigating the former responsible persons from Varengold due to a particularly serious case of tax evasion.

In August 2020, the credit house was searched by investigators due to the cum-ex investigations.

On June 27, 2023, BaFin prohibited Varengold Bank AG from conducting transactions with "payment agents" and other third parties related to Iran due to high money laundering risks and serious deficits in money laundering prevention.

== See also ==
- List of banks in Germany
