= Stephen Kinnock =

British politician (born 1970)

The Right Honourable Stephen Kinnock MP
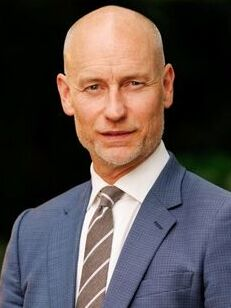
- Official portrait, 2026

Secretary of State for Wales
- Incumbent
- Assumed office 20 July 2026
- Prime Minister: Andy Burnham
- Preceded by: Jo Stevens

Minister of State for Care
- In office 8 July 2024 – 20 July 2026
- Prime Minister: Keir Starmer
- Preceded by: Helen Whately
- Succeeded by: Alison McGovern

Member of Parliament for Aberafan Maesteg Aberavon (2015–2024)
- Incumbent
- Assumed office 7 May 2015
- Preceded by: Hywel Francis
- Majority: 10,354 (29.0%)

Spouse of the Prime Minister of Denmark
- In role 3 October 2011 – 28 June 2015
- Prime Minister: Helle Thorning-Schmidt
- Preceded by: Sólrun Løkke Rasmussen
- Succeeded by: Sólrun Løkke Rasmussen
Shadow portfolios
2022–2024	Immigration
2021–2022	Armed Forces
2020–2021	Asia and the Pacific

Personal details
- Born: Stephen Nathan Kinnock; 1 January 1970 (age 56) Tredegar, Wales
- Party: Labour
- Spouse: Helle Thorning-Schmidt (m. 1996)
- Children: 2
- Parents: Neil Kinnock (father); Glenys Parry (mother)
- Education: Queens' College, Cambridge (BA); College of Europe (MA)
- Website: stephenkinnock.co.uk
- Stephen Kinnock's voice Kinnock's closing remarks at the 2011 World Economic Forum on Europe and Central Asia; Recorded 9 June 2011

Stephen Nathan Kinnock (born 1 January 1970) is a British politician who has served as Secretary of State for Wales since 2026. A member of the Labour Party, he has been the Member of Parliament (MP) for Aberafan Maesteg, formerly Aberavon, since 2015. Kinnock is the husband of the former Prime Minister of Denmark from 2011 to 2015, Helle Thorning-Schmidt.

== Early life and education ==
Kinnock was born in Tredegar, Monmouthshire, the son of British politicians Glenys Kinnock and Neil Kinnock. He describes himself as from a "Labour and Trade Union family".

Kinnock was educated at Drayton Manor High School, a comprehensive school in Hanwell, London. He read Modern Languages at Queens' College, Cambridge, taking a BA degree. In 1993, he obtained a MA degree at the College of Europe in Bruges.

Although Kinnock's mother was a Welsh speaker, his father was not; he has suggested that Glenys "was reluctant to use Welsh with me for fear of shutting him out".

== Early career ==
Kinnock worked as a research assistant at the European Parliament before becoming a British Council Development and Training Services executive based in Brussels in 1997. He held various positions with the British Council including director of its St. Petersburg office. Following the Russian authorities' closure of this office, Kinnock was posted to the British Council in Sierra Leone.

In January 2009, he joined the World Economic Forum as director, head of Europe and Central Asia, based in Geneva, Switzerland. In August 2012, he took up a position at the business consultancy Xyntéo in London, Kinnock was managing director of the "Global Leadership and Technology Exchange" in 2012.

Refuted tax evasion allegation

In June 2010, the Danish tabloid newspaper B.T. accused Kinnock of tax evasion. At that time, he was paying tax in Switzerland where his workplace was situated, and where he had declared his main residence, although his wife's political website stated that "The family lives in Østerbro in Copenhagen". The couple had previously stated to the media that Kinnock would spend his weekends in Denmark, sometimes including Thursday, and that he regarded his home and base as being exclusively with his family in Copenhagen. According to the newspaper, he would possibly exceed 183 days a year in Denmark, meaning he would be fully taxable there. His wife rebutted the accusations but said the couple would ask the Danish tax authority for an audit. The audit was completed on 17 September 2010, and concluded that "Mr Kinnock does not have tax liability for 2007, 08, or 09, as he does not reside in this country within the meaning of the Danish Tax at Sources Act".

== Political career ==
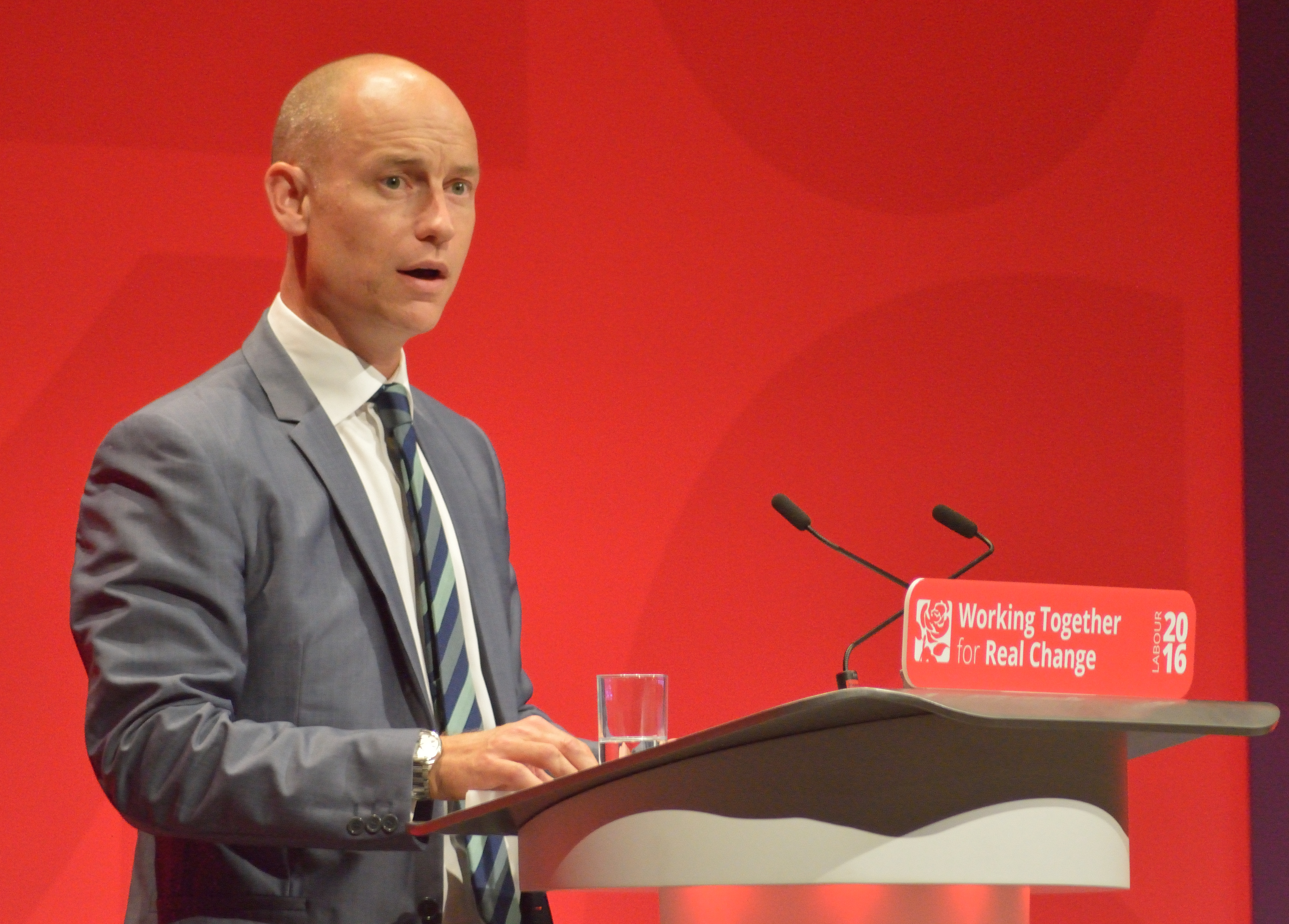
Kinnock speaking at the 2016 Labour Party Conference

In March 2014, Kinnock was selected as the Labour Party candidate for the seat of Aberavon in Wales for the 2015 General Election. He defeated candidates including Jeremy Miles to win the selection. On 7 May 2015, he was elected the Member of Parliament for Aberavon with a majority of 10,445.

Kinnock was appointed Parliamentary private secretary (PPS) to the shadow Business, Innovation and Skills team in September 2015. He resigned as PPS in June 2016 and supported Owen Smith's failed attempt to replace Jeremy Corbyn in the 2016 Labour leadership election.

During the 2017 general election campaign, Kinnock was one of four MPs critical of Jeremy Corbyn's leadership of the Labour Party who were followed for six weeks for the BBC documentary Labour: The Summer that Changed Everything. The documentary showed Kinnock predicting the poll would "not be a good night" for Labour, and his ambivalent response to Labour gains in the election. He was re-elected in 2017 with an increased majority of 16,761, and 68.1% of the vote share.

Kinnock held his seat at the 2019 general election with a majority of 10,490 and a vote share of 53.8%. He endorsed Lisa Nandy in the 2020 Labour leadership election.

Following Keir Starmer's election as Labour Leader in April 2020, he was appointed as Shadow Asia and Pacific Minister. Kinnock changed role in the December 2021 front bench reshuffle, becoming Shadow Armed Forces Minister, and moved again in February 2022, following Jack Dromey's death, to become Shadow Immigration Minister. His constituency boundary changed and he won re-election in the 4 July 2024 General election.

COVID-19 non-compliance allegation

Kinnock posted a photo on Twitter after travelling from Wales to London to visit his father on his birthday on 28 March 2020 – five days after the lockdown came into force. They were social distancing, but South Wales Police responded: "We know celebrating your Dad's birthday is a lovely thing to do; however, this is not essential travel. We all have our part to play in this, we urge you to comply with @GOVUK restrictions, they are in place to keep us all safe. Thank you." Kinnock stated that "this was essential travel as I had to deliver some necessary supplies to my parents."

Assisted dying

Kinnock stated in November 2024 that he would vote in favour of legislation on assisted dying. He said the bill introduced by Kim Leadbeater was the 'compassionate thing' to do, and insisted that it would not increase costs for the NHS, a direct contradiction of his own Secretary of State, Wes Streeting. Kinnock served on the committee examining the legislation.

=== Care Minister ===
Kinnock was appointed Minister of State for Care in July 2024 under Keir Starmer.

=== Wales Secretary ===
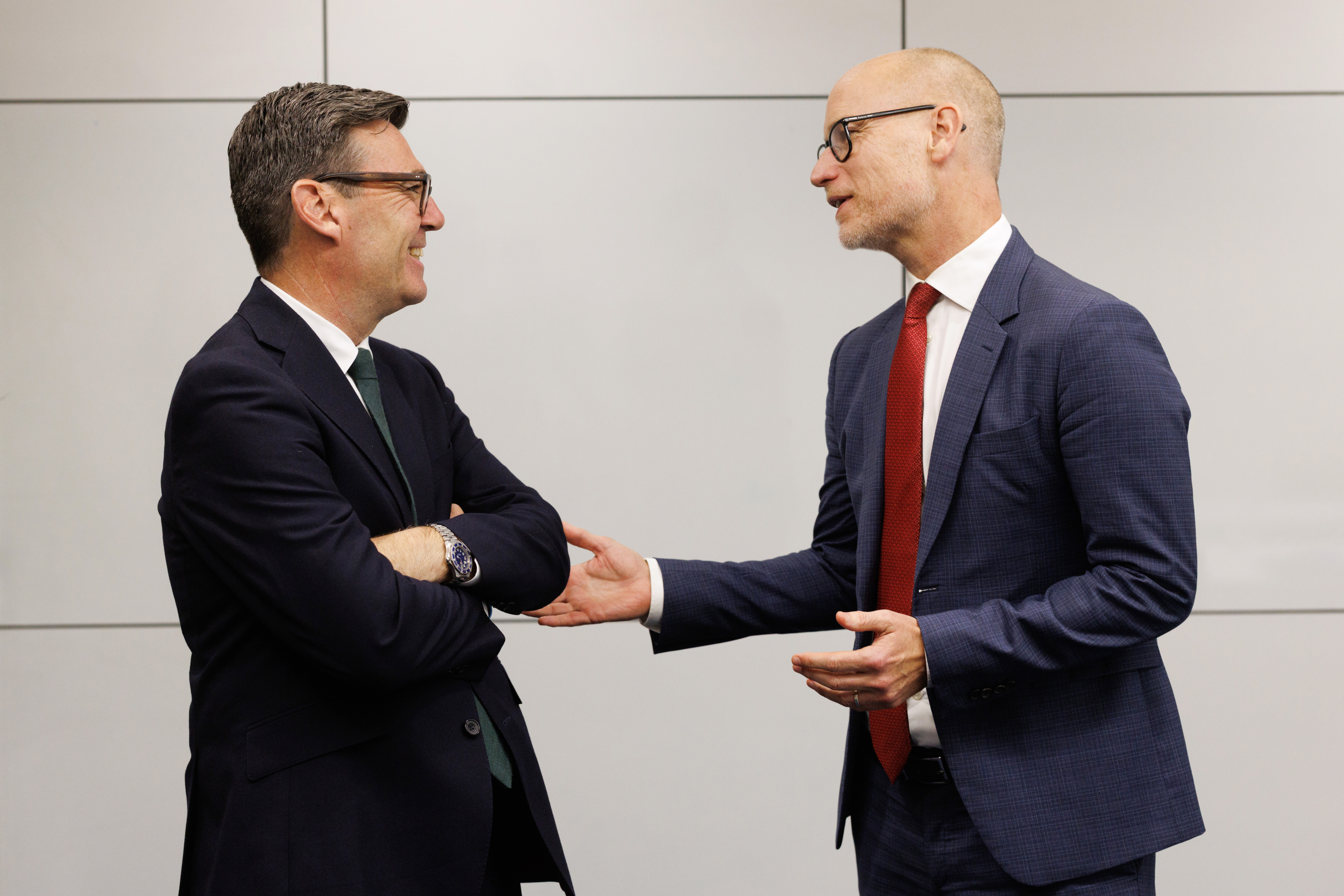
Kinnock meeting Prime Minister Andy Burnham in 2026

On 20 July 2026, Kinnock was promoted to cabinet and appointed Secretary of State for Wales by Andy Burnham, succeeding Jo Stevens.

== Personal life ==
His father, Neil Kinnock, is a former Leader of the Labour Party and was also a European commissioner and Vice President of the European Commission. His mother, Glenys Kinnock, formerly served as a Labour Party Member of the European Parliament (MEP). His younger sister Rachel has three children, works in the media and in 2025 became a trustee of The Jo Cox Foundation.

In 1996, Kinnock married Helle Thorning-Schmidt, who later became Prime Minister of Denmark. They met when both attended the College of Europe. The couple have two children, including a child who came out as transgender and non-binary in 2022, aged 22. Their grandfather Neil Kinnock spoke of his pride after his grandchild came out as transgender.

Kinnock is an honorary associate of the National Secular Society.

== Honours ==
When his father was created a Life peer in 2005 as Baron Kinnock of Bedwellty, Kinnock was granted the prefix The Honourable as the son of a baron.

On 21 July 2026, Kinnock was affirmed into the Privy Council, entitling him to be styled with the honorific title "The Right Honourable" for life.

Parliament of the United Kingdom
Preceded by Hywel Francis	Member of Parliament for Aberavon; 2015–2024	Constituency abolished
New constituency	Member of Parliament for Aberafan Maesteg; 2024–present	Incumbent
