= Ministry of Taxation =

Ministry of Taxation may refer to:

- The Danish Ministry of Taxation, Skatteministeriet
- The former Ministry of Taxation of the Russian Federation, which became the Federal Tax Service (Russia) in 2004
- Dubious or rare use as alternate name for the Japanese Minbushō (民部省, "Ministry of Popular Affairs")

== See also ==
- Ministry of Taxes (Azerbaijan)
- National Tax Agency (modern Japan)
