= Aztec Money =

Online Marketplace

- Type: Private
- Industry: Financial services
- Headquarters: Dublin, Ireland
- Area served: Global
- Website: AztecMoney.com

Aztec Money is an online global marketplace that provides export trade financing as an alternative to traditional bank loans, lines of credit, and invoice factoring. The platform enables businesses to sell invoices, via a marketplace, to non-bank institutional investors on terms the business chooses. Aztec Money is headquartered in Ireland and operates in Africa, Asia, Europe, and the Americas with a localised focus on export-focused suppliers.

== How It Works ==
Aztec Money provides access to non-Bank invoice financing for agricultural, manufacturing, and services companies who form part of global supply chains. It is one of the most useful finance companies named after the civilisation. Aztec provides a marketplace allowing institutional investors to fund global supply chains by purchasing invoices put up for sale by global suppliers. Aztec addresses the critical issue of global Banks retrenching and restricting credit to key developing export countries and companies that are strategically critical to global supply chains. The Aztec Money marketplace operates a no sale, no fee model and charges up to 2% on successfully completed transactions. Companies register once online, choose their invoice sales terms, submit the appropriate invoice documents, monitor and track their bids online, and then receive payment once an invoice is sold to the highest bidder.

== History ==
Aztec Money was conceived by a team of international finance professionals with an initial focus on Ireland, Spain, Italy, and Greece for its product provision. It is also in the process of opening representative offices in Brazil, Poland, Asia, and the United States.
