= Autism Rocks =

British charity

Autism Rocks was a United Kingdom-based charitable organisation founded by Sanjay Shah to raise awareness about autism through charitable music events. All funds raised by Autism Rocks went to the Autism Research Trust, which in turn supported research by the Autism Research Centre at Cambridge University.

== Overview ==
Autism Rocks gained international popularity after organising an event with late music artist Prince. The Guardian reported that Prince 'love-bombed' the crowd. Artists such as Zayn Malik, Lenny Kravitz, Snoop Dogg and Ricky Martin have also participated.

It created the Autism Rocks Support Centre, one of the first not-for-profit autism centres in the United Arab Emirates. This centre shut down in February 2020 amidst the tax fraud probe against Sanjay Shah.
