= Arne Rolighed =

Danish politician

Arne Rolighed (Flade på Mors, 2 June 1947) is a Danish former politician and the current president of the Danish Cancer Society until July 2010. Although he was never a member of the Danish parliament, Prime minister Poul Nyrup Rasmussen appointed him as Health Minister in December 2000, a position he held until the Social Democratic government lost the 2001 parliamentary election to Venstre's Anders Fogh Rasmussen.

== Early life ==
Born in Flade på Mors. He graduated in political science from Aarhus University.

== Notes ==
Political offices
Preceded by Sonja Mikkelsen	Health Minister of Denmark; 2000–2001	Succeeded by Lars Løkke Rasmussen; Minister of the Interior and Health
