= Sólrun Løkke Rasmussen =

Wife of the Prime Minister of Denmark

Sólrun Jákupsdóttir Løkke Rasmussen
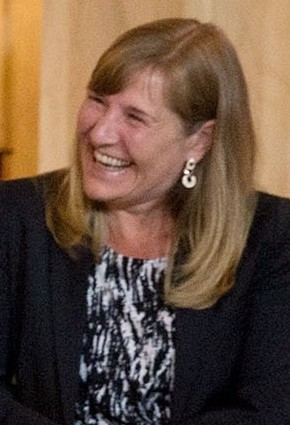

Spouse of the Prime Minister of Denmark
- In office 28 June 2015 – 27 June 2019
- Monarch: Margrethe II
- Prime Minister: Lars Løkke Rasmussen
- Preceded by: Stephen Kinnock
- Succeeded by: Bo Tengberg
- In office 5 April 2009 – 3 October 2011
- Monarch: Margrethe II
- Prime Minister: Lars Løkke Rasmussen
- Preceded by: Anne-Mette Rasmussen
- Succeeded by: Stephen Kinnock

Member of the Gribskov Municipality Council
- In office 2009–2013

Member of the Græsted-Gilleleje City Council
- In office 1998–2005

Personal details
- Born: Sólrun Jákupsdóttir Petersen; 22 November 1968 (age 57) Tórshavn, Faroe Islands
- Party: Venstre
- Spouse: Lars Løkke Rasmussen

Sólrun Jákupsdóttir Løkke Rasmussen (born 22 November 1968) is the wife of the former Prime Minister of Denmark, Lars Løkke Rasmussen.

== Early life and family ==
Rasmussen was born Sólrun Jákupsdóttir on 22 November 1968 in Tórshavn, Faroe Islands. She is the daughter of chief physician Jákup Petersen and lecturer Bergljót av Skarði. Her mother's parents were the Tjóðveldi politician Sigurð Joensen and the writer Sigrið av Skarði, who was the daughter of the Faroese folk educationist and poet Símun av Skarði.

Rasmussen moved from the Faroe Islands to Denmark to study medicine. After her marriage to Lars Løkke Rasmussen and the birth of their children, Rasmussen ended her pre-medical training. Rasmussen and her husband have 3 children.

== Career ==
From 1998 to 2005, Rasmussen was a city council member for Græsted-Gilleleje, representing the Venstre Party . Beginning in 2001, Rasmussen studied education at Zahles Seminarian, earning a Teaching Certification in 2005. Since 2005, Rasmussen has taught English, mathematics, physics and natural science at the Royal Danish Theatre's Laeseskolen in Copenhagen.

Her husband assumed the position of prime minister on April 5, 2009. When he was elected, there was some controversy in the Danish media over Sólrun Løkke Rasmussen's proper title. Rasmussen was sometimes described as "Førstedame" (First Lady), rather than Statsministerfrue (Wife of the Prime Minister), although Queen Margrethe II as head of state was considered Denmark's official first lady.

In 2009, Rasmussen returned to politics and was elected to a council seat in Gribskov municipality for the Venstre Party. In October 2009, she visited Liberia where she met with Liberian President Ellen Johnson Sirleaf as representative for the Danish Refugee Council.

Following her husband's resumption as prime minister in June 2015, Rasmussen took over as chairman of the Løkke Foundation. The foundation, begun in 2012 by Lars Løkke, focuses on providing programs for boys with learning disabilities.
