= CumEx-Files =

European financial scandal

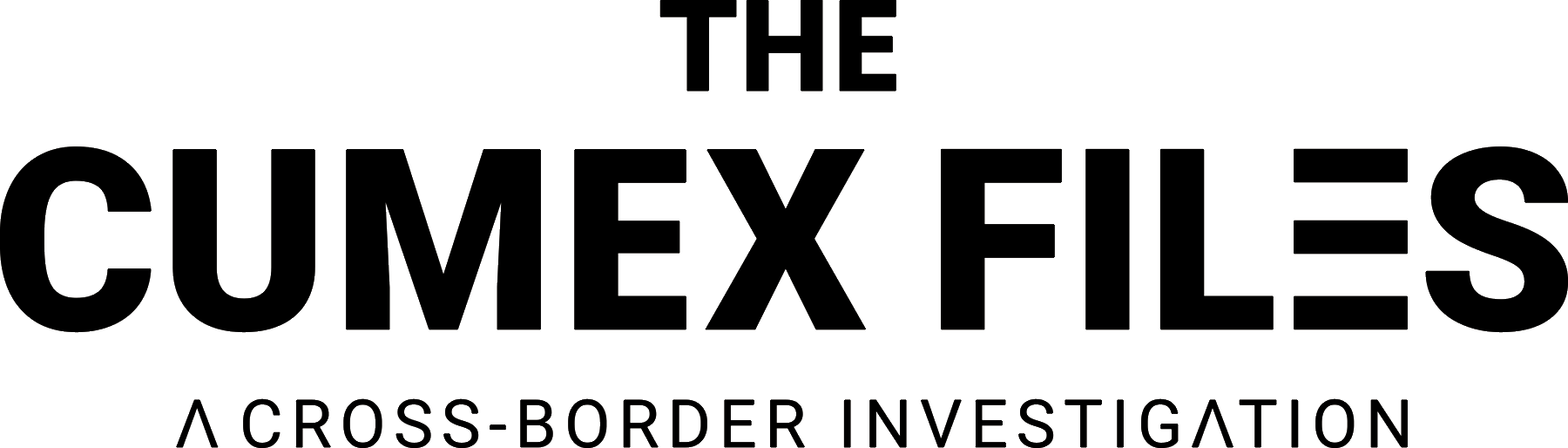
- Date: 18 October 2018
- Location: Europe
- Type: Tax evasion
- Outcome: Loss of roughly $63.2 billion.

Countries affected by the fraud Hard hit countries Mildly hit countries Barely hit countries Unaffected countries

The CumEx-Files is an investigation by a number of European news media outlets into a tax fraud scheme discovered by them in 2017. A network of banks, stock traders, and lawyers had obtained billions from European treasuries through suspected fraud and speculation involving dividend taxes. The five hardest hit countries may have lost at least $62.9 billion. Germany is the hardest hit country, with around $36.2 billion withdrawn from the German treasury. Estimated losses for other countries include at least €17 billion for France, €4.5 billion in Italy, €1.7 billion in Denmark and €201 million for Belgium.

== Method ==
The network stole several billion Euros from the treasury, through what Correctiv calls a "cum-ex" trade: The participants in the network would lend each other shares in large companies, so that to tax authorities there would appear to be two owners of the shares, when there was only one. The bank that was used in stock trading would then issue a "confirmation" to the investor that tax on the dividend payment had been paid, without it being done. "It's a bit like parents claiming a child benefit for two – or more – children when there is only one child in the family." writes Correctiv. This practice was outlawed in 2012.

In cum-ex trades, shares with and without dividend rights were quickly traded between various market participants just before the payout date for the dividend, allowing traders to reclaim double the taxes.

Financial institutions in essence allowed two parties to simultaneously claim ownership of the same shares, therefore allowing both to claim tax rebates to which they were not entitled.

Authorities have since deemed the reclaims illegitimate, but at the time of the trades, this was less black and white, and a vast network of traders, analysts and lawyers were thought to be involved in the practice throughout the continent.

The prestigious law firm Freshfields Bruckhaus Deringer gave tax advice which was used to justify the legality of the scheme. In November 2019, Ulf Johannemann, a former Freshfields partner who was head of the international tax department, was arrested. In January 2024 Ulf Johannemann was found guilty of aiding and abetting a multiyear dividend tax fraud and sentenced to three years and six months in jail in a landmark ruling by a Frankfurt court.

In May 2020, the European Banking Authority announced a 10-point action plan to enhance the future regulatory framework surrounding dividend arbitrage trading schemes. According to the report, in some countries, the cum ex deals are not criminal offenses.

== Danish dividend scandal ==
In 2010, in an audit report, the Danish Ministry of Taxation was found to have ignored warnings on multiple occasions of a procedural loophole concerning dividend tax. It was reported in the press that in some cases single claimants had demanded and obtained refunds for more dividend taxes than those Danish companies paid foreigners in total

In June 2020, it was reported by investigators that such transactions took advantage of European rules on the taxing of dividends, which made it possible to get refunds by using a combination of short sales and future transactions.

=== Sanjay Shah and Solo Capital ===
The most prominent figure in the Danish dividend tax scandal is British former hedge fund trader Sanjay Shah, the founder of Solo Capital. Between 2012 and 2015, Shah's network of entities was instrumental in claiming an estimated DKK 8 billion in dividend tax refunds from the Danish Ministry of Taxation (SKAT), which authorities later determined to be fraudulent claims based on "cum-ex" style trading. Shah consistently argued he was merely exploiting a legal tax loophole, not committing fraud.

The Danish government pursued civil and criminal actions against Shah for nearly a decade. After a protracted legal process, Shah was extradited from Dubai to Denmark in December 2023 to face criminal charges. Following a trial, a Danish court found him guilty of tax fraud in December 2024 and sentenced him to 12 years in prison, the longest sentence ever handed down for a financial crime in the country. He was also ordered to forfeit assets valued at approximately $1 billion. This criminal conviction followed a Dubai civil court ruling in 2022 that ordered Shah and other suspects to return approximately DKK 8 billion to Denmark.

Shah also faces scrutiny in other jurisdictions related to the CumEx schemes. In February 2025, he was charged in Germany over deals resulting in an estimated loss of €46.5 million to the German treasury. Separately, a civil claim brought by SKAT in the UK High Court seeking to recover £1.4 billion was dismissed in October 2025; the court ruled that SKAT's own weak internal controls prevented the authority from having been legally misled, leaving SKAT liable for a substantial amount of the defendants' legal costs.

== Lawsuits in France ==
At the end of October 2018, the Socialist deputy Boris Vallaud filed a complaint against X for fraud and aggravated tax fraud laundering with the National Financial Prosecutor's Office. A parliamentary information mission on tax evasion of the National Assembly has also published a report on the results of the fight against cross-border malicious financial engineering.

== Discovery ==
The German State Commissioner August Schäfer first warned of the practice in 1992, after the testimony of five whistleblowers. However, the practice remained widespread until an administrative assistant in the German Federal Central Tax Office noticed abnormally large tax rebate claims from a US pension fund.

== Implicated institutions ==
Various banks and other financial institutions were involved in these alleged trades. Among those named in the leaked files include Macquarie Bank, Deutsche Bank, HypoVereinsbank, M. M. Warburg, Maple Bank, Merrill Lynch, KPMG, Ernst & Young, Investec, and Freshfields. Investigations revealed that since 2012 Investec had provided the Dutch broker Frank Vogel with more than €12 billion to facilitate his alleged tax arbitrage scheme.

== See also ==
- Dividend stripping
