= Debtor finance =

Debtor finance is a process to fund a business using its accounts receivable ledger as collateral. Generally, companies that have low working capital reserves can get into cash flow problems because invoices are paid on net 30 terms. Debtor finance solutions fund slow-paying invoices, which improves the cash flow of the company and puts it in a better position to pay operating expenses.

Types of debtor financing solutions include invoice discounting, factoring, cashflow finance, asset finance, invoice finance and working capital finance.

== Need ==
Most businesses have to offer credit terms, usually of 30 days, in order to secure orders from customers. Current statistics show that these invoices can take up to 60 days to be paid. This delay reduces essential cash flow and restricts the growth of the business.

== Security requirements ==
Security requirements vary, but traditionally focus on the value of the debtors ledger, supported by a pledge of specific assets as collateral and a charge or mortgage over the business, along with the personal guarantees of directors. Apart from some specialised lenders, real estate security is not taken. By focusing on the value and collectability of the accounts receivable ledger, most debtor finance credit lines will automatically increase in response to increases in sales, and provide ongoing working capital to fund the growth of the business. Typically the advance rate ranges from 70% of accounts receivable ledger value up to 90%. The remaining 30% to 10%, known as the 'retention' is released following receipt of payment of each invoice by the customer/debtor/buyer.

== Types ==
Debtor finance products, by whatever name, essentially fall into two categories:

- Confidential: the customer or end-user is unaware of the funding being provided, often called 'invoice discounting',
- Disclosed: traditionally referred to as 'factoring', where invoices have a notice that warns the customer to pay the funds to the financier in settlement of the debt.

Export factoring is a highly specialised and selective form of factoring, and can provide non-recourse funding to exporters, paid at the time of shipment, and with solvency of the overseas importer underwritten by an overseas bank or institution.

Under each category there are a number of financiers, all with varying policies and guidelines regarding their procedures, security, pricing and target markets. There are providers of import and export factoring, and their conditions vary widely.

== Transaction structure ==
Most debtor financing transactions are structured to operationally resemble an asset-based loan. The client submits its accounts receivable ledger to the finance company. The finance company processes the ledger and remits the funds to the client's bank account. Lenders often finance a percentage of the ledger, commonly 80%–85%, and hold the rest as a reserve. The percentage of the ledger that is financed varies and is based on the industry and risk profile of the client.

The reserve is remitted to the client once the advances settle, when customers pay their invoices.

== Terms of providers ==
Some providers have minimum terms, exit fees, notice periods, audit requirements, etc. that need to be fully assessed prior to entering into any agreement.

Due to the involvement by the financier with a factored customer, the advance rate on such invoices is higher than with a confidential facility. In addition, some facilities marketed as 'confidential' still require completion of anonymous 'audits' before invoices are funded.

Most financiers will fund invoices for up to 90 days from the month the invoice was issued, and will 'recourse' any invoice not paid by the end of the 90 days. 120-day recourse periods are provided in exceptional circumstances.

Providers in some countries will offer a non-recourse, or limited recourse facility, where the provider assumes part or all of the credit risk on a debtor. Other providers may insist on the client taking out credit insurance on their customers, with the policy and benefits assigned to the provider.

Credit limits may also be set on individual customers to minimise risk by some financiers, and 'concentration' limits might also limit funding available to major customers, or to specific classes of customers.

Knowledge of all these issues is important to ensure that a debtor finance partnership is with a compatible financier.

== Eligibility ==
A firm's eligibility to sell off its invoices by means of factoring is dependent on the terms of acceptance of the factor. These terms do vary from factor to factor. Most factors would consider the rate at which the firm realizes bad debts by checking the firms bad debts account while another could only consider the reputation of the firm. Most business that provide goods or services to other businesses on credit can qualify for debtor finance. Debtor finance is more difficult to place for contractors involved in the building industry, but there are some specialised providers that are comfortable with contract issues.

== Growth ==
The use of debtor financing has grown strongly, as it has become more widely recognised as a valuable financing tool, supplementing or replacing traditional overdrafts or fixed-limit business loans. Internationally, debtor finance business has grown from €40 billion in 1978 to over €580 billion in 2003, provided by more than 1,000 companies, most of whom are associated with international banks. This volume is greater than the business written each year in leasing.
