= Bergur Løkke Rasmussen =

Danish politician (born 1990)

Bergur Løkke Rasmussen MEP
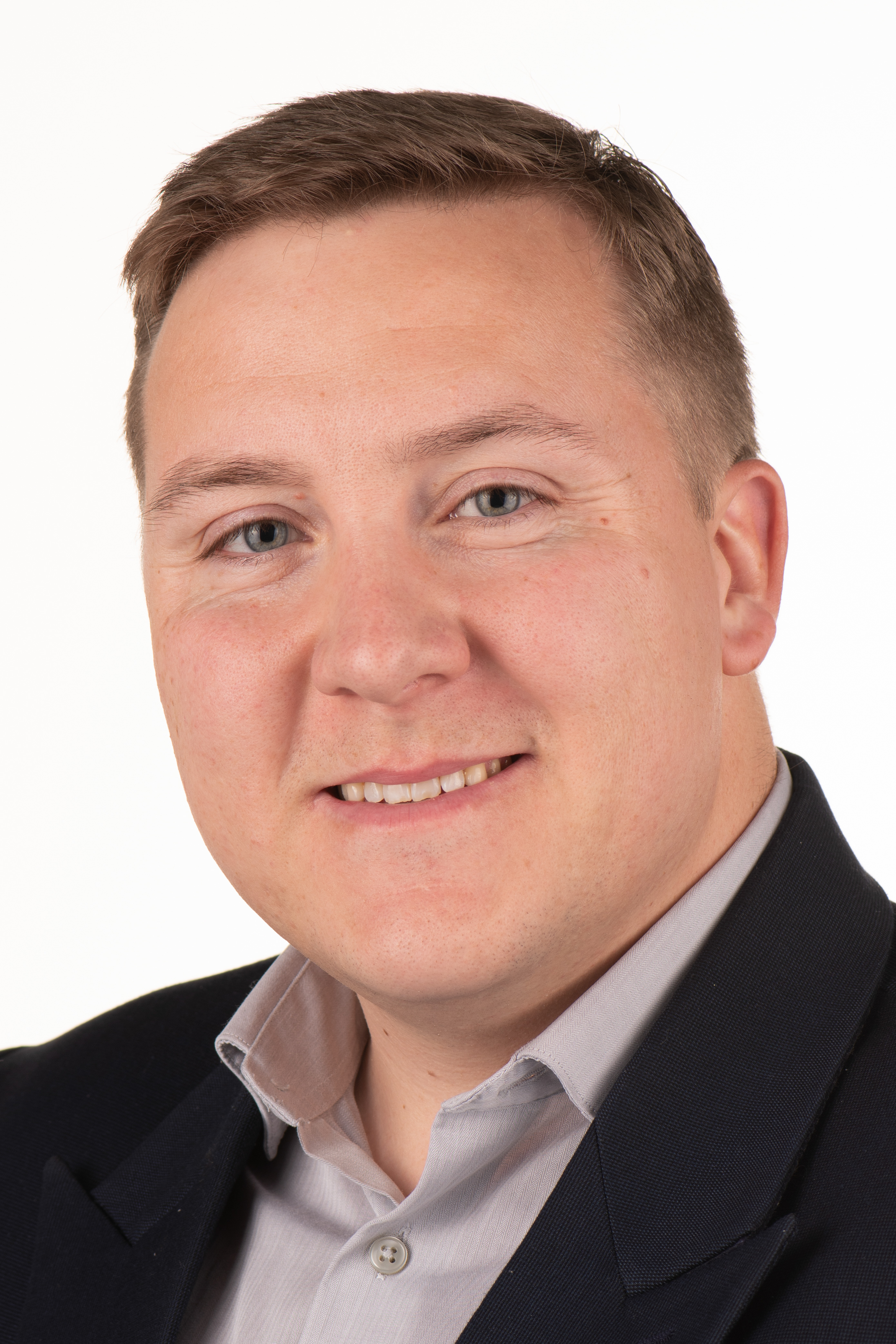

Member of the European Parliament for Denmark
- Incumbent
- Assumed office 14 November 2022
- Preceded by: Linea Søgaard-Lidell

Personal details
- Born: 4 March 1990 (age 36) Gilleleje, Denmark
- Party: Moderates (2023–present); Venstre (2007–2023)
- Spouse: Simone Spånberg
- Children: 1

Bergur Løkke Rasmussen (born 4 March 1990) is a Danish politician who serves as a member of the European Parliament (MEP) for the Moderates, the centrist political party he switched to in March 2023, away from the centre-right Venstre. He is the son of former Prime Minister and Minister of Foreign Affairs Lars Løkke Rasmussen.

== See also ==
- List of members of the European Parliament for Denmark, 2019–2024
