= Linea Søgaard-Lidell =

Danish politician (born 1987)

Linea Søgaard-Lidell MEP
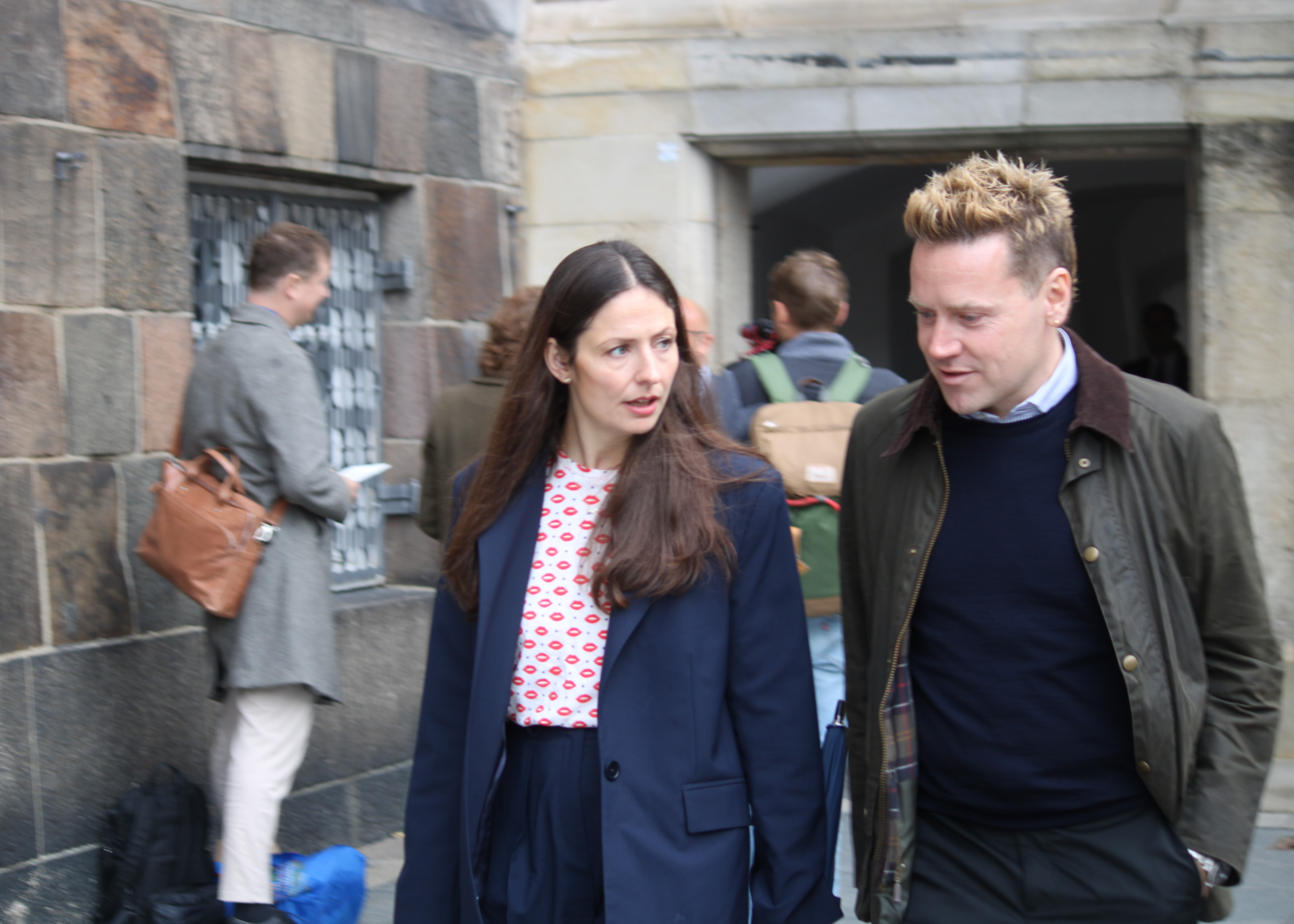
- Søgaard-Lidell (to the left) in 2025

Member of the European Parliament for Denmark
- In office 1 February 2020 – 14 November 2022
- Preceded by: Seat redistributed after Brexit
- Succeeded by: Bergur Løkke Rasmussen

Member of the Folketing
- Incumbent
- Assumed office 1 November 2022

Personal details
- Born: 30 March 1987 (age 39) Aarhus, Denmark
- Party: Venstre
- Education: Aarhus University, Maastricht University

Linea Søgaard-Lidell (born 30 March 1987) is a Danish politician.

== Political career ==
Linea Søgaard-Lidell stood in the 2019 European Parliament election in Denmark. She was placed 4th on the Venstre list and won 24,153 personal votes, and so was not elected immediately but secured a seat among the British seats that were redistributed after the United Kingdom left the European Union, which she took after Brexit. She sat with the Renew Europe group.

In November 2022, Søgaard-Lidell resigned from the European Parliament after being elected to the Folketing in the 2022 Danish general election, and was replaced by Bergur Løkke Rasmussen.
