= Lars Løkke Rasmussen =

Prime Minister of Denmark (2009–2011; 2015–2019)

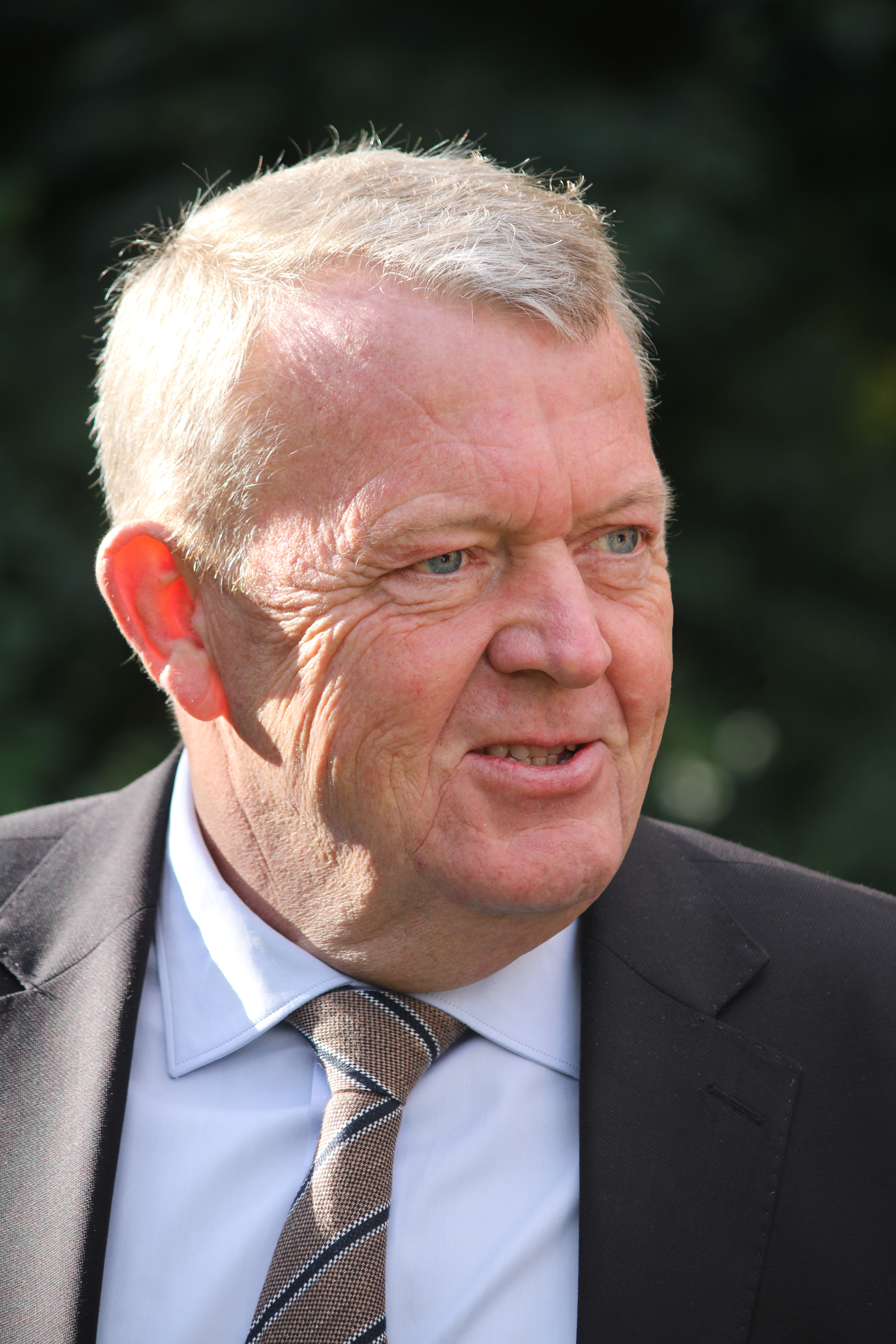
- Rasmussen in 2025

Minister of Foreign Affairs
- Incumbent
- Assumed office 15 December 2022
- Prime Minister: Mette Frederiksen
- Preceded by: Jeppe Kofod

Leader of the Moderates
- Incumbent
- Assumed office 5 June 2022
- Preceded by: Party established

Prime Minister of Denmark
- In office 28 June 2015 – 27 June 2019
- Monarch: Margrethe II
- Preceded by: Helle Thorning-Schmidt
- Succeeded by: Mette Frederiksen
- In office 5 April 2009 – 3 October 2011
- Monarch: Margrethe II
- Preceded by: Anders Fogh Rasmussen
- Succeeded by: Helle Thorning-Schmidt

Leader of Venstre
- In office 17 May 2009 – 31 August 2019
- Preceded by: Anders Fogh Rasmussen
- Succeeded by: Jakob Ellemann-Jensen

Minister of Finance
- In office 23 November 2007 – 7 April 2009
- Prime Minister: Anders Fogh Rasmussen
- Preceded by: Thor Pedersen
- Succeeded by: Claus Hjort Frederiksen

Minister of the Interior and Health
- In office 27 November 2001 – 23 November 2007
- Prime Minister: Anders Fogh Rasmussen
- Preceded by: Karen Jespersen (Interior); Arne Rolighed (Health)
- Succeeded by: Karen Jespersen (Social Welfare); Jakob Axel Nielsen (Health and Prevention)

Member of the Folketing
- Incumbent
- Assumed office 21 September 1994
- Constituency: Zealand (from 2015); North Zealand (2007–2015); Frederiksborg (1994–2007)

Personal details
- Born: 15 May 1964 (age 62) Vejle, Denmark
- Party: Moderates (2021–present)
- Other political affiliations: Venstre (1980–2021)
- Spouse: Sólrun Jákupsdóttir
- Children: 3, including Bergur Løkke Rasmussen
- Education: University of Copenhagen
- Website: Official website

Lars Løkke Rasmussen K.1 (Danish: [ˈlɑːs ˈløkə ˈʁɑsmusn̩]; born 15 May 1964) is a Danish politician serving as Minister of Foreign Affairs and as Leader of the Moderates since 2022. He previously served two non-consecutive terms as Prime Minister of Denmark between 2009 and 2011 and then again between 2015 and 2019, and as Leader of Venstre between 2009 and 2019.

Rasmussen has been a member of the Folketing since 1994. He also served as County Mayor of Frederiksborg County from 1998 to 2001. Subsequently, he was the Interior and Health Minister from 27 November 2001 to 23 November 2007 as part of Anders Fogh Rasmussen's first and second cabinets, and then Minister of Finance from 23 November 2007 to April 2009 as part of Anders Fogh Rasmussen's third cabinet. On 5 April 2009, he succeeded Anders Fogh Rasmussen as prime minister following the latter's appointment as Secretary General of NATO.

In the 2011 general election, the government lost its parliamentary majority and Rasmussen tendered the government's resignation to Queen Margrethe II. He was succeeded by Helle Thorning-Schmidt of the Social Democrats on 3 October 2011. In the 2015 general election, the right-wing parties regained a majority in the Folketing. Rasmussen again became prime minister and formed his second cabinet in the same month. This cabinet was made up exclusively of Venstre members, but in November 2016 he was pressured to also include members of Liberal Alliance and Conservative People's Party, forming his third cabinet.

On 6 June 2019, he resigned from his position as prime minister after a general election, in which his government was defeated. However, he continued to lead a caretaker government until a new government was formed and sworn in. This was completed on 27 June 2019 and Rasmussen was succeeded as prime minister by Mette Frederiksen. He resigned as the chairman of Venstre in August 2019, and left the party in January 2021. He subsequently formed the Moderates, which campaigned on ending bloc politics, and won 16 seats in the 2022 Danish general election.

== Early life ==
Lars Løkke Rasmussen was born in Vejle to Jeppe Rasmussen and Lise Løkke Rasmussen. His last name is Rasmussen, while Løkke is his middle name.

He graduated from high school in 1983, and was the president of the youth branch of Venstre from 1986 to 1989. He graduated with a law degree (cand. jur) from the University of Copenhagen in 1992. From 1990 to 1995 he worked as a self-employed consultant.

Lars Løkke Rasmussen is married to Sólrun Løkke Rasmussen (née Sólrun Jákupsdóttir). Together they have three children.

== Political career ==
=== Venstres Ungdom chairmanship and Afghanistan mission ===
Lars Løkke Rasmussen served as chairman of the youth branch of Venstre from 1986 to 1989. One of his initiatives was to establish an alternative to Operation Dagsværk – an annual one day fundraising campaign by high school students collecting money for third world countries – since Operation Dagsværk at the time was spearheaded by members of the Danish Communist Youth. Rasmussen's campaign was supported by the party youth branch, and raised 600,000 DKK which were spent on school equipment in Soviet occupied Afghanistan. Lars Løkke Rasmussen led a Danish delegation to Afghanistan delivering the collected funds, and a photograph taken by photographer Jørn Stjerneklar shows him and two other delegation members disguised as Afghans. Another photo shows him holding an AK-47, while standing together with three Mujahideen. The photos have generated a lot of media attention in Denmark, after the Danish participation in the war in Afghanistan and especially as Rasmussen moved up the rankings at Venstre.

=== County Mayor and deputy chairman of Venstre ===
Rasmussen was elected deputy chairman of Venstre in 1998, at the same time as Anders Fogh Rasmussen assumed the position as party leader after Uffe Ellemann-Jensen. In 1998, he was elected as county mayor of Frederiksborg County, a position he occupied until 2001, when he joined the first Fogh Rasmussen cabinet.

=== Minister of the Interior and Health ===
Lars Løkke Rasmussen served as Interior and Health Minister between 2001 and 2007 until he was appointed Minister of Finance in 2007. He was responsible for negotiating a 2002 agreement between Venstre, the Conservatives, the Social Democrats and the Danish People's Party giving patients in public hospitals the right to select a private hospital, provided that the public hospital had been unable to treat the patient within two months. In 2007, this time limit was lowered to one month. Since 2002, the government has awarded extra funds earmarked at reducing the waiting list at National Health Service hospitals, a grant sometimes referred to by the media as Løkkeposen (A pun on 'lykkepose' the Danish word for a goodie bag). He also represented the government during negotiations regarding a reform of the system by which richer municipalities transfer part of their tax incomes to poorer municipalities.

==== Municipal reform of 2007 ====
As Minister of the Interior and Health, Lars Løkke Rasmussen spearheaded the municipal reform that reduced Denmark's 271 municipalities to 98, and abolished the 14 counties and replaced them with five regions.

=== Minister of Finance ===
After then Prime Minister Anders Fogh Rasmussen won his second reelection in 2007 he created his third cabinet in which Lars Løkke Rasmussen was appointed Minister of Finance. This was seen as a clear indicator that Rasmussen was next in line to follow Fogh as leader of Venstre and prime minister, when Fogh would leave Danish politics. As Finance Minister Lars Løkke Rasmussen led the negotiations concerning funds to banks affected by the 2008 financial crisis.

==== Tax reform of 2009 ====
In February 2009, Lars Løkke Rasmussen was the chief negotiator in the political agreement behind a major tax reform, implementing the government's ambition of reducing income tax and increasing taxes on pollution. The reform was, according to Lars Løkke Rasmussen, the biggest reduction of the marginal tax rate since the introduction of the income tax in 1903. The opposition accused it of being historically skewed in favouring those with high-income jobs and giving very little to those with low-income jobs.

== Prime Minister of Denmark ==
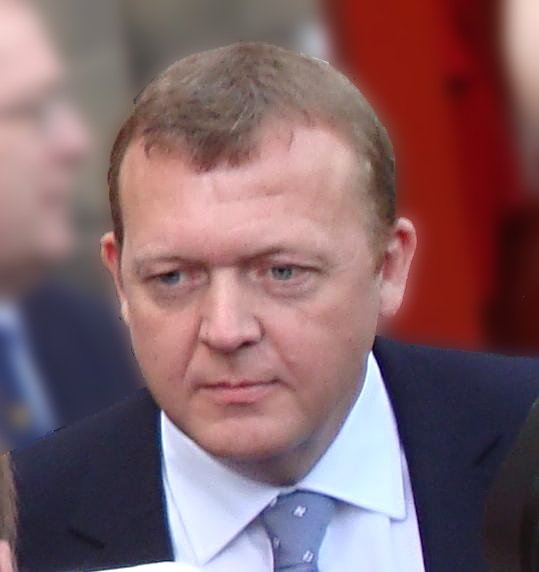
Rasmussen outside Amalienborg Palace immediately after his appointment as Prime Minister by Queen Margrethe

On 4 April 2009, NATO decided that Prime Minister Anders Fogh Rasmussen would replace Jaap de Hoop Scheffer as Secretary General of NATO. On the same day, Anders Fogh Rasmussen declared that he would resign as prime minister on 5 April 2009. As deputy of the largest party in the government, Lars Løkke Rasmussen thus took over the post as Prime Minister of Denmark. An opinion poll released on the day of Lars Løkke Rasmussen's takeover revealed that Danes believed that he only beat Helle Thorning-Schmidt as the person best suited for lead Denmark during the 2008 financial crisis, and that Thorning-Schmidt would have been better suited to combatting unemployment, reducing hospital waiting lists, securing the welfare society of the future, and representing Denmark internationally. On 7 April 2009, Lars Løkke Rasmussen announced the new set of ministers in his Cabinet.

=== COP15 - December 2009 ===
Lars Løkke Rasmussen has been sharply criticized from many sides for his handling of the COP15 leadership.

At the first meeting of the summit high level section, led by Lars Løkke Rasmussen, a number of countries protested the Danish handling of the negotiations. "We cannot continue to talk about procedure. We must move forward. The World awaits us", said Lars Løkke Rasmussen responding to criticism of the Danish led negotiations coming from several countries who regarded them as undemocratic.

Many developing countries viewed this statement as arrogant. Procedure is a major element in UN negotiations. "This is not about procedure. This is about content. We have stated that the results in Copenhagen must come in two texts. One cannot simply present a text pulled from the clouds", replied the Chinese delegate in the auditorium.

Stanislaus Lumumba Di-Aping, chief negotiator for the Developing Nations' organisation G77, cross examined what exactly Rasmussen meant when stating that the chairmen of the negotiating groups should be "people whom we trust". Criticism of the Office of the Prime Minister was supported by China, India and Brazil. The last had been regarded as an ally by the Danish delegation.

The international press, too, has been severe in its criticism of the Prime Minister and the Prime Minister's Office. The BBC's climate correspondent stated: "According to all my sources, the Prime Minister's Office is on the verge of a melt-down. They have no modus operandi, or the diplomatic experience needed to plan one in advance. Ed Miliband, the UK Secretary of State for Energy and Climate Change, was quoted for stating that "Denmark is doing a reasonable job".

=== Budget cuts ===
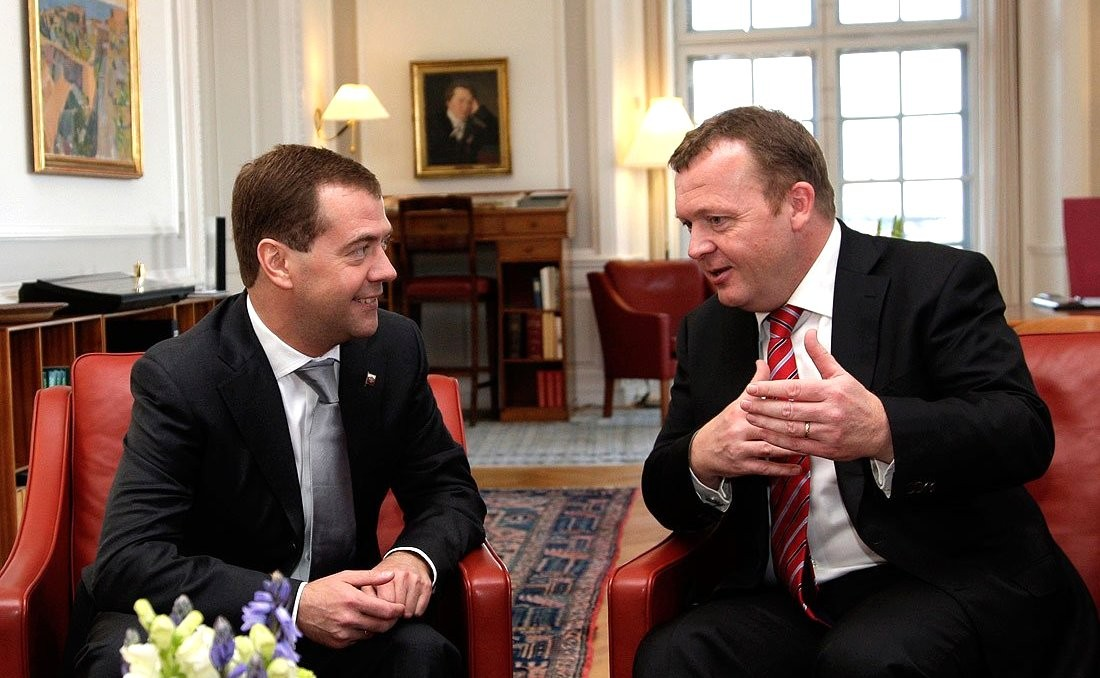
Lars Løkke Rasmussen and Russian President Dmitrij Medvedev in the Prime Minister's office at Christiansborg in Copenhagen, Denmark, 28 April 2010

In May 2010 Rasmussen's government announced major spending cuts and measures designed to increase revenues, notably to unemployment insurance (cut from a maximum of four years to two), foreign aid (cut from 0.83% of GDP to 0.76%), cuts to child support payments, and miscellaneous tax reforms designed to increase revenues. The cuts were designed to save the government 24 billion DKK.

=== 2011 election ===
Rasmussen led Venstre in the September 2011 parliamentary election. He sought to renew the mandate of the right-wing coalition that had been in power since 2001. Although his party gained a seat, the opposition parties combined obtained more seats than the parties supporting the incumbent government. On 16 September 2011, Rasmussen tendered the government's resignation to Queen Margrethe. He remained in office as head of a caretaker government until his successor, Helle Thorning-Schmidt, was appointed on 3 October 2011.

=== 2015 election and return to government ===
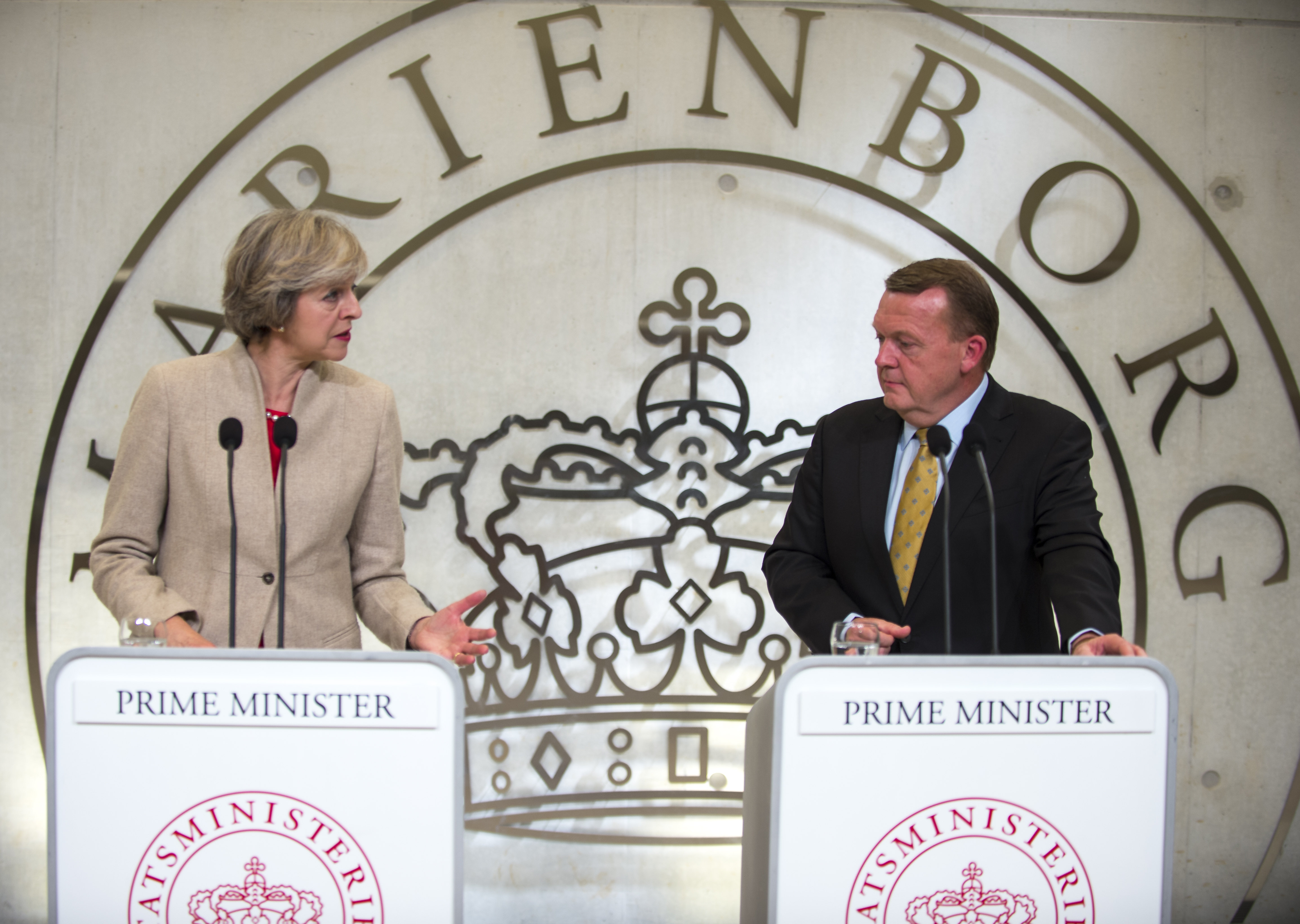
Rasmussen with UK Prime Minister Theresa May, Copenhagen, 10 October 2016

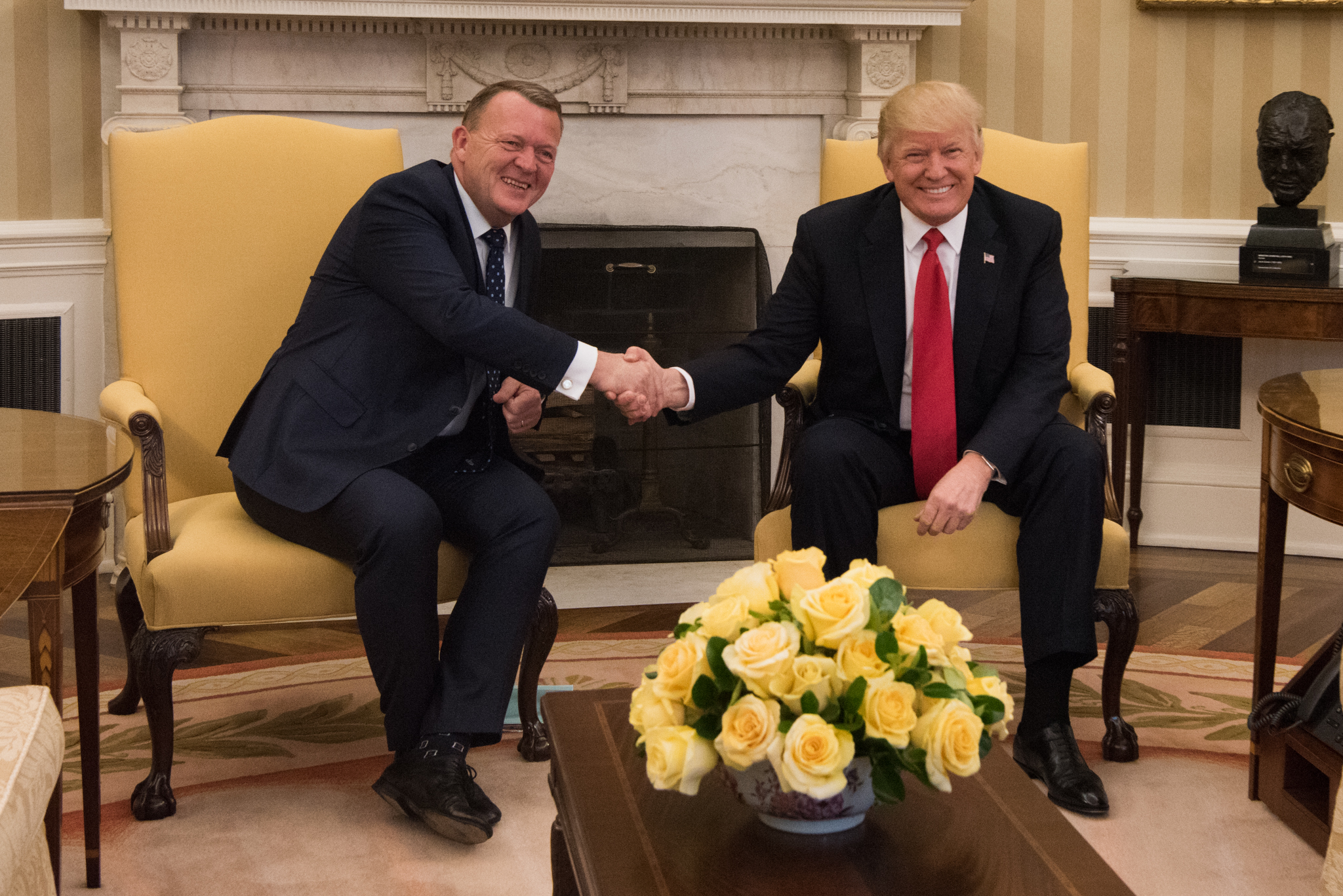
Rasmussen with U.S. President Donald Trump, Washington, D.C., 30 March 2017

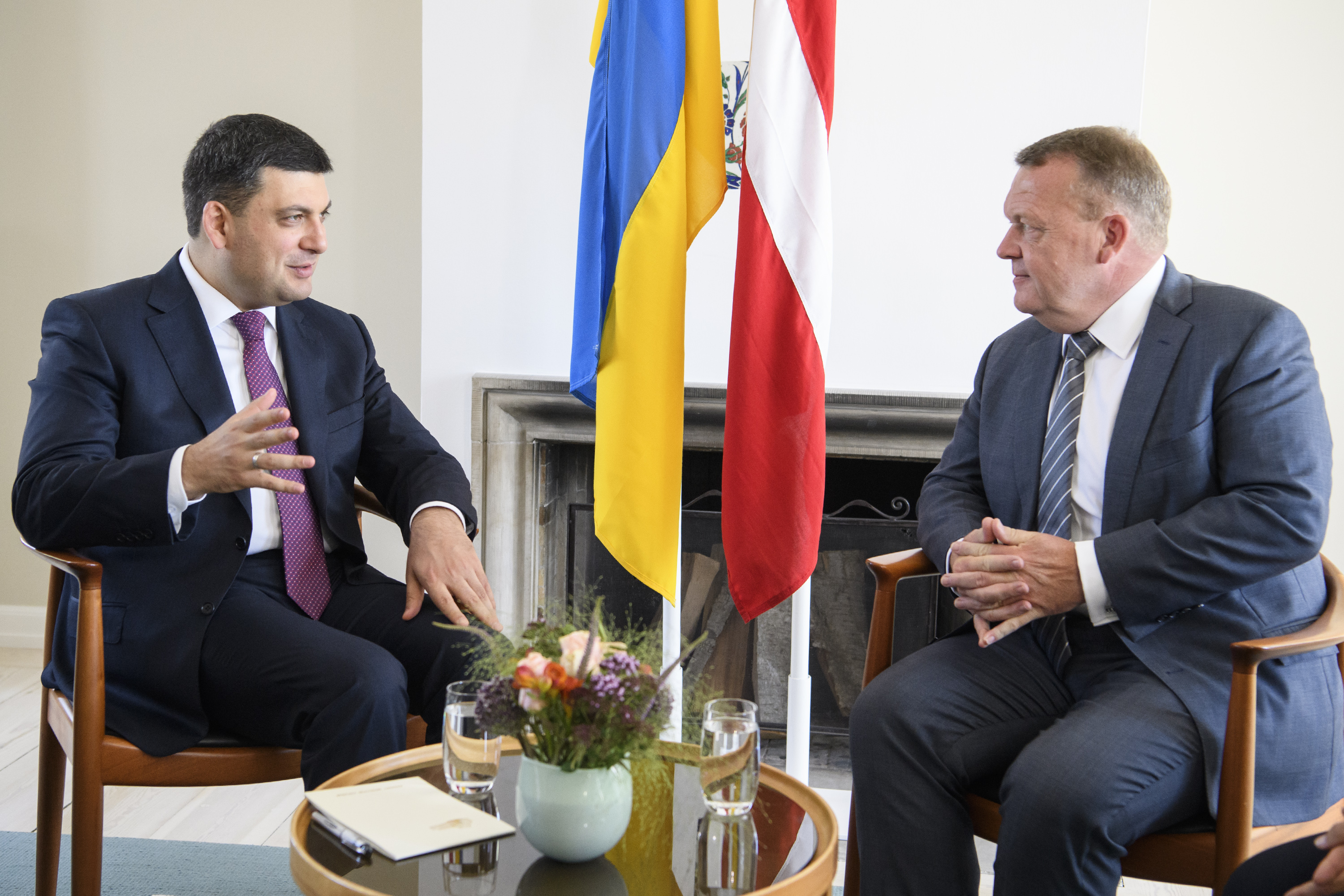
Rasmussen with Ukrainian Prime Minister Volodymyr Groysman, Copenhagen, 26 June 2018

Rasmussen led Venstre in the June 2015 general election. His Blue Bloc won a tight election in which his party came third overall, winning Rasmussen the ability to form a government.

All members of Lars Løkke Rasmussen's second Cabinet, composed solely of members of Venstre, were sworn in on 28 June 2015 in the Danish Parliament. As of July 2015, his Cabinet consists of seventeen ministers.

In 2015, Rasmussen denied US Senator Bernie Sanders's characterization of Denmark as socialist, noting that the nation had a market economy.

On 28 November 2016 Rasmussen presented Lars Løkke Rasmussen III Cabinet, composed of members of Venstre, Conservative People's Party and Liberal Alliance.

On 31 May 2018 it was announced that Denmark would be banning full-face veils.

== After premiership ==
=== 2019 general election ===
Though Venstre made the largest gains of any party in the 2019 general election, support for the Danish People's Party and Liberal Alliance collapsed, costing Rasmussen his majority. With the result beyond doubt on election night, Rasmussen conceded defeat to the "red bloc" under the Social Democrats' Mette Frederiksen. On 6 June 2019, he announced his resignation. On 31 August 2019, Rasmussen resigned from his position as the chairman of Venstre party following weeks of pressure from party members.

== Leader of the Moderates ==
In 2021 Rasmussen founded a new party, the Moderates. In the 2022 Danish general election, the Moderates became the third largest party winning 16 seats. Rasmussen himself received 38,439 personal votes. Following lengthy government negotiations, he was appointed minister of foreign affairs in Mette Frederiksen's second cabinet.

=== Minister of Foreign Affairs ===
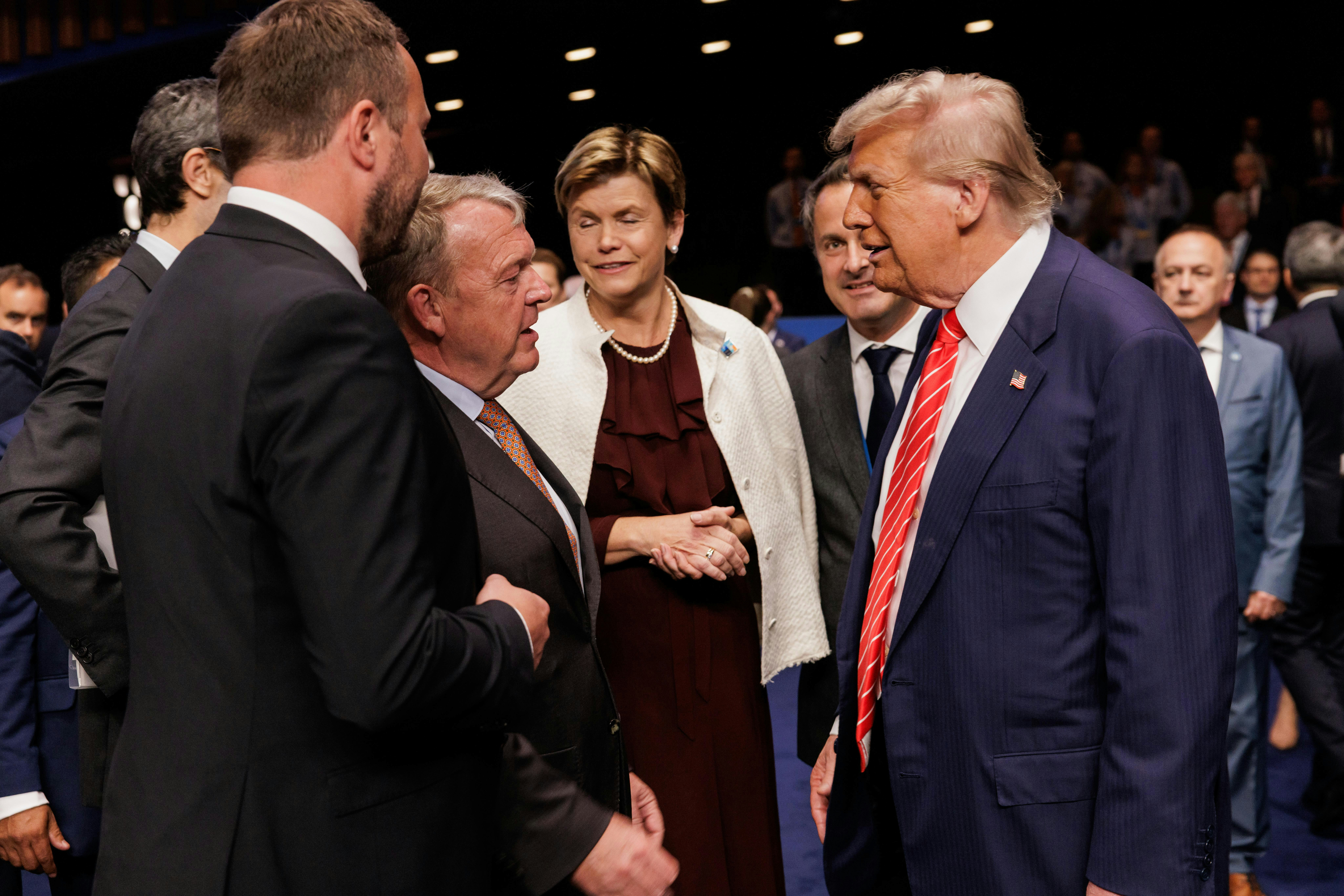
Rasmussen speaking with US President Donald Trump at the NATO summit in The Hague, 25 June 2025

In July 2024, he attended the 2024 NATO Summit in Washington, D.C., where he met with Israeli Foreign Minister Israel Katz. They discussed the threat posed by Iran.

Løkke Rasmussen and his Nordic counterparts signed a joint letter in late October 2024 condemning Israel's planned bill that would seek to ban the UNRWA from operating in the country and in effect the Palestinian areas. Furthermore, they urged the Knesset to reconsider passing the bill.

After the US strikes on Iranian nuclear sites in June 2025, Rasmussen said, "Iran must never develop nuclear weapons," and "the U.S. acted to prevent this." He urged the parties to return to negotiations to avoid further escalation.

In January 2026, Løkke Rasmussen and Greenlandic foreign minister Vivian Motzfeldt met with US Secretary of State Marco Rubio and US Vice President JD Vance to discuss the US threats of conquering Greenland. Following the meeting, he stated that "not respecting Greenland's territorial integrity is completely unacceptable" and that the two countries still had "fundamental differences" about the issue. He also described the meeting as constructive despite the differences on the matter.

== Controversies ==
=== Tax spending ===
Rasmussen has on several occasions been accused of spending tax payer money on himself and his family. In the spring of 2008, he was accused by the media - essentially the Danish tabloid Ekstra Bladet - of having charged his official accounts with considerable expenses he should have paid himself, e.g. restaurants, cigarettes, taxis, and hotels, both as county mayor and as minister. All of this has been well documented, according to several independent media sources, although all charges were dropped and there was never a court trial. It was something that was according to the rules of the party Venstre. In May 2007, Rasmussen was again accused by Ekstra Bladet of having his ministry pay for a hotel room in Copenhagen when he privately attended a Paul McCartney concert in Horsens in 2004. Since the many serious scandals surrounding Rasmussen were brought to the attention of the public, Venstre has suffered in the polls.

=== Global Green Growth ===
In 2013, the Global Green Growth Institute (GGGI) was criticized by two member countries for its financial management: Norway withheld $10 million in donations, citing excessive spending on flights and food by GGGI's former Council Chairman Lars Løkke Rasmussen, and both Norway and Denmark demanded an audit of the organization's finances before renewing support for 2014. Rasmussen was, as the chairman, accused of being greedy, while the other members of GGGI were not accused.

=== School pressure ===
In 2018, Rasmussen's wife Sólrun Løkke Rasmussen, facing termination from her job as a teacher, was called to a meeting with the head of the school where she worked. Rasmussen, as his wife's civil assessor, accompanied her to the meeting, along with his bodyguards. His wife was fired at the meeting. The case resulted in criticism as Rasmussen's presence, as then-Prime Minister, could be perceived as inappropriate pressure on the school leader; for meetings of this sort, it is usually the union representative that functions as the civil assessor.

=== Little Danes Experiment ===
While prime minister, in response to calls from Greenland for a formal investigation into and an apology from the Danish government regarding the 1951 Little Danes Experiment, where Inuit children were stolen from their families to be "re-educated" into Danish culture, Rasmussen refused to make an apology. Instead, he said that: "History cannot be changed. The government regards the colonial period as a closed part of our shared history. We must be pleased with the fact that times have changed." Just as Rasmussen refused to apologise, so too did following prime ministers of Denmark, and Helle Thorning-Schmidt declined to participate in an investigation. In 2019, two Greenlandic members of the Folketing made demands: Aaja Chemnitz (Inuit Ataqatigiit) demanded that an apology be made, and Ineqi Kielsen (Siumut) demanded that an investigating commission be made. As a result of Kielsen's request, Rasmussen agreed with Greenlandic prime minister Kim Kielsen to create a commission, though he again refused to make an apology.

=== Accusations of attempted bribery ===
In June 2025, a video tape was leaked by Mads Brügger, revealing that Rasmussen offered former Moderate MP Mike Fonseca about 370.000 Danish kroner in exchange for Fonseca leaving the Folketing and giving his mandate to the Moderate Party, after Fonseca was revealed to be in a relationship with a 15-year old girl. Afterwards, chairman of the Citizens Party Lars Boje Mathiesen filed a motion of no confidence against Rasmussen, and Rasmussen was also reported to the Danish Police by lawyer Klaus Ewald.

=== Kirsten Birgit was not allowed to joke about Løkke and alcohol ===
For New Year's 2026, the well-known comedian Frederik Cilius, in his role as the outspoken Kirsten Birgit, was set to deliver a roast for a New Year recap program on the channel TV2 Charlie. Frederik Cilius had been told he had free rein in his performance. However, TV 2 became concerned about a number of crude jokes about the country's Foreign Minister Lars Løkke Rasmussen's drinking habits, as they feared they could be defamatory, and therefore asked for them to be removed from the roast.

Frederik Cilius, however, refused to agree to this, and as a result, the collaboration was terminated. Instead, comedian Lasse Rimmer delivered an edited roast. This led to a public debate, both about political freedom of expression and about Lars Løkke's widely known alcohol abuse.

== Personal life ==
His son Bergur Løkke Rasmussen was a Member of the European Parliament from 2022-2024, and is currently a member of the Regional Council of the Capital Region of Denmark.

== Honours ==
=== National honours ===
- Commander 1st Class of the Order of the Dannebrog (2009)

=== Foreign honours ===
- Belgium: Grand Cross of the Order of the Crown (2017)
- Egypt: Grand Cordon of the Order of the Nile (2024)
- Finland: Grand Cross of the Order of the Lion of Finland (2025)
- France: Grand Cross of the National Order of Merit (2018)
- Greece: Grand Cross of the Order of the Phoenix (2009)
- Iceland: Grand Cross of the Order of the Falcon (2017)
- Latvia: Grand Cross of the Cross of Recognition (2025)
- Mexico: Sash of Special Category of the Order of the Aztec Eagle (2016)
- South Korea: Grand Gwanghwa Medal of the Order of Diplomatic Service (2011)
- Spain: Grand Cross of the Order of Civil Merit (2023)

Political offices
Preceded by Kirsten Ebbensgaard	County Mayor of Frederiksborg; 1998–2001	Succeeded by Jørgen Christensen
Preceded by Karen Jespersen as Minister of the Interior	Minister of the Interior and Health; 2001–2007	Succeeded by Karen Jespersen as Minister of Social Welfare
Preceded by Arne Rolighed as Minister of Health	Minister of the Interior and Health; 2001–2007	Succeeded by Jakob Axel Nielsen as Minister of Health and Prevention
Preceded by Thor Pedersen	Minister of Finance; 2007–2009	Succeeded by Claus Hjort Frederiksen
Preceded by Anders Fogh Rasmussen	Prime Minister of Denmark; 2009–2011	Succeeded by Helle Thorning-Schmidt
Preceded by Helle Thorning-Schmidt	Leader of the Opposition; 2011–2015	Succeeded by Mette Frederiksen
Preceded by Helle Thorning-Schmidt	Prime Minister of Denmark; 2015–2019	Succeeded by Mette Frederiksen
Preceded by Mette Frederiksen	Leader of the Opposition; 2019	Succeeded by Jakob Ellemann-Jensen
Preceded by Jeppe Kofod	Minister for Foreign Affairs; 2022–present	Incumbent
Party political offices
Preceded by Anders Fogh Rasmussen	Leader of Venstre; 2009–2019	Succeeded by Kristian Jensen; Acting
New title	Leader of the Moderates; 2022–present	Incumbent
