= Factoring (finance) =

Financial transaction and a type of debtor finance

Factoring is a financial transaction and a type of debtor finance in which a business sells its accounts receivable (i.e., invoices) to a third party (called a factor) at a discount. A business will sometimes factor its receivable assets to meet its immediate cash needs. Forfaiting is a factoring arrangement used in international trade finance by exporters who wish to sell their receivables to a forfaiter. Factoring is commonly referred to as accounts receivable factoring, invoice factoring, and sometimes accounts receivable financing. Accounts receivable financing is a term more accurately used to describe a form of asset based lending against accounts receivable. The Commercial Finance Association is the leading trade association of the asset-based lending and factoring industries. In 2019, the Commercial Finance Association rebranded to the Secured Finance Network (SFNet).

In the United States, factoring is not the same as invoice discounting (which is called an assignment of accounts receivable in American accounting – as propagated by FASB within GAAP). Factoring is the sale of receivables, whereas invoice discounting ("assignment of accounts receivable" in American accounting) is a borrowing that involves the use of the accounts receivable assets as collateral for the loan. However, in some other markets, such as the UK, invoice discounting is considered to be a form of factoring, involving the "assignment of receivables", that is included in official factoring statistics. It is therefore also not considered to be borrowing in the UK. In the UK the arrangement is usually confidential in that the debtor is not notified of the assignment of the receivable and the seller of the receivable collects the debt on behalf of the factor. In the UK, the main difference between factoring and invoice discounting is confidentiality. Scottish law differs from that of the rest of the UK, in that notification to the account debtor is required for the assignment to take place. The Scottish Law Commission reviewed this position and made proposals to the Scottish Ministers in 2018.

== Overview ==
There are three parties directly involved: the factor who purchases the receivable, the one who sells the receivable, and the debtor who has a financial liability that requires him or her to make a payment to the owner of the invoice. The receivable, usually associated with an invoice for work performed or goods sold, is essentially a financial asset that gives the owner of the receivable the legal right to collect money from the debtor whose financial liability directly corresponds to the receivable asset. The seller sells the receivables at a discount to the third party, the specialized financial organization (aka the factor) to obtain cash. This process is sometimes used in manufacturing industries when the immediate need for raw material outstrips their available cash and ability to purchase "on account". Both invoice discounting and factoring are used by B2B companies to ensure they have the immediate cash flow necessary to meet their current and immediate obligations. Invoice factoring is not a relevant financing option for retail or B2C companies because they generally do not have business or commercial clients, a necessary condition for factoring.

The sale of the receivable transfers ownership of the receivable to the factor, indicating the factor obtains all of the rights associated with the receivables. Accordingly, the receivable becomes the factor's asset, and the factor obtains the right to receive the payments made by the debtor for the invoice amount, and is free to pledge or exchange the receivable asset without unreasonable constraints or restrictions. Usually, the account debtor is notified of the sale of the receivable, and the factor bills the debtor and makes all collections; however, non-notification factoring, where the client (seller) collects the accounts sold to the factor, as agent of the factor, also occurs. The arrangement is usually confidential in that the debtor is not notified of the assignment of the receivable and the seller of the receivable collects the debt on behalf of the factor. If the factoring transfers the receivable "without recourse", the factor (purchaser of the receivable) must bear the loss if the account debtor does not pay the invoice amount. If the factoring transfers the receivable "with recourse", the factor has the right to collect the unpaid invoice amount from the transferor (seller). However, any merchandise returns that may diminish the invoice amount that is collectible from the accounts receivable are typically the responsibility of the seller, and the factor will typically hold back paying the seller for a portion of the receivable being sold (the "factor's holdback receivable") in order to cover the merchandise returns associated with the factored receivables until the privilege to return the merchandise expires.

There are four principal parts to the factoring transaction, all of which are recorded separately by an accountant who is responsible for recording the factoring transaction:

1. the "fee" paid to the factor,
2. the Interest Expense paid to the factor for the advance of money,
3. the "bad debt expense" associated with portion of the receivables that the seller expects will remain unpaid and uncollectable,
4. the "factor's holdback receivable" amount to cover merchandise returns, and (e) any additional "loss" or "gain" the seller must attribute to the sale of the receivables. Sometimes the factor's charges paid by the seller (the factor's "client") covers a discount fee, additional credit risk the factor must assume, and other services provided. The factor's overall profit is the difference between the price it paid for the invoice and the money received from the debtor, less the amount lost due to non-payment.

== Rationale ==
Factoring is a method used by some firms to obtain cash. Certain companies factor accounts when the available cash balance held by the firm is insufficient to meet current obligations and accommodate its other cash needs, such as new orders or contracts; in other industries, however, such as textiles or apparel, for example, financially sound companies factor their accounts simply because this is the historic method of financing. The use of factoring to obtain the cash needed to accommodate a firm's immediate cash needs will allow the firm to maintain a smaller ongoing cash balance. By reducing the size of its cash balances, more money is made available for investment in the firm's growth.

Debt factoring is also used as a financial instrument to provide better cash flow control especially if a company currently has a lot of accounts receivables with different credit terms to manage. A company sells its invoices at a discount to their face value when it calculates that it will be better off using the proceeds to bolster its own growth than it would be by effectively functioning as its "customer's bank." Accordingly, factoring occurs when the rate of return on the proceeds invested in production exceed the costs associated with factoring the receivables. Therefore, the trade-off between the return the firm earns on investment in production and the cost of utilizing a factor is crucial in determining both the extent factoring is used and the quantity of cash the firm holds on hand.

Many businesses have cash flow that varies. It might be relatively large in one period, and relatively small in another period. Because of this, businesses find it necessary to both maintain a cash balance on hand, and to use such methods as factoring, in order to enable them to cover their short term cash needs in those periods in which these needs exceed the cash flow. Each business must then decide how much it wants to depend on factoring to cover short falls in cash, and how large a cash balance it wants to maintain in order to ensure it has enough cash on hand during periods of low cash flow.

Generally, the variability in the cash flow will determine the size of the cash balance a business will tend to hold as well as the extent it may have to depend on such financial mechanisms as factoring. Cash flow variability is directly related to two factors:

1. The extent cash flow can change, and
2. The length of time cash flow can remain at a below average level.

If cash flow can decrease drastically, the business will find it needs large amounts of cash from either existing cash balances or from a factor to cover its obligations during this period of time. Likewise, the longer a relatively low cash flow can last, the more cash is needed from another source (cash balances or a factor) to cover its obligations during this time. As indicated, the business must balance the opportunity cost of losing a return on the cash that it could otherwise invest, against the costs associated with the use of factoring.

The cash balance a business holds is essentially a demand for transactions money. As stated, the size of the cash balance the firm decides to hold is directly related to its unwillingness to pay the costs necessary to use a factor to finance its short term cash needs. The problem faced by the business in deciding the size of the cash balance it wants to maintain on hand is similar to the decision it faces when it decides how much physical inventory it should maintain. In this situation, the business must balance the cost of obtaining cash proceeds from a factor against the opportunity cost of the losing the Rate of Return it earns on investment within its business. The solution to the problem is:

$CB = \sqrt {\frac {i \times nCF}{(2 \times r)}}$

where

- $CB$ is the cash balance
- $nCF$ is the average negative cash flow in a given period
- $i$ is the [discount rate] that cover the factoring costs
- $r$ is the rate of return on the firm's assets.

Today factoring's rationale still includes the financial task of advancing funds to smaller rapidly growing firms who sell to larger more credit-worthy organizations. While almost never taking possession of the goods sold, factors offer various combinations of money and supportive services when advancing funds.

Factors often provide their clients four key services: information on the creditworthiness of their prospective customers domestic and international, and, in nonrecourse factoring, acceptance of the credit risk for "approved" accounts; maintain the history of payments by customers (i.e., accounts receivable ledger); daily management reports on collections; and, make the actual collection calls. The outsourced credit function both extends the small firm's effective addressable marketplace and insulates it from the survival-threatening destructive impact of a bankruptcy or financial difficulty of a major customer. A second key service is the operation of the accounts receivable function. The services eliminate the need and cost for permanent skilled staff found within large firms. Although today even they are outsourcing such back-office functions. More importantly, these services insure entrepreneurs and owners against a major source of a liquidity crises and their equity.

== Process ==
The factoring process can be broken up into two parts: the initial account setup and ongoing funding. Setting up a factoring account typically takes one to two weeks and involves submitting an application, a list of clients, an accounts receivable aging report and a sample invoice. The approval process involves detailed underwriting, during which time the factoring company can ask for additional documents, such as documents of incorporation, financials, and banks statements. If approved, the business will be set up with a maximum credit line from which they can draw. In the case of notification factoring, the arrangement is not confidential and approval is contingent upon successful notification; a process by which factoring companies send the business's client or account debtor a Notice of Assignment. The Notice of Assignment serves to

1. inform debtors that a factoring company is managing all of the business's receivables,
2. stake a claim on the financial rights for the receivables factored, and
3. update the payment address – usually a bank lock box.

Once the account is set up, the business is ready to start funding invoices. Invoices are still approved on an individual basis, but most invoices can be funded in a business day or two, as long as they meet the factor's criteria. Receivables are funded in two parts. The first part is the "advance" and covers 80% to 85% of the invoice value. This is deposited directly to the business's bank account. The remaining 15% to 20% is rebated, less the factoring fees, as soon as the invoice is paid in full to the factoring company.

== Accounts receivable discounting ==
Non-recourse factoring should not be confused with making a loan. When a lender decides to extend credit to a company based on assets, cash flows, and credit history, the borrower must recognize a liability to the lender, and the lender recognizes the borrower's promise to repay the loan as an asset. Factoring without recourse is a sale of a financial asset (the receivable), in which the factor assumes ownership of the asset and all of the risks associated with it, and the seller relinquishes any title to the asset sold. An example of factoring is the credit card. Factoring is like a credit card where the bank (factor) is buying the debt of the customer without recourse to the seller; if the buyer doesn't pay the amount to the seller the bank cannot claim the money from the seller or the merchant, just as the bank in this case can only claim the money from the debt issuer. Factoring is different from invoice discounting, which usually doesn't imply informing the debt issuer about the assignment of debt, whereas in the case of factoring the debt issuer is usually notified in what is known as notification factoring. One more difference between the factoring and invoice discounting is that in case of factoring the seller assigns all receivables of a certain buyer(s) to the factor whereas in invoice discounting the borrower (the seller) assigns a receivable balance, not specific invoices. A factor is therefore more concerned with the credit-worthiness of the company's customers. The factoring transaction is often structured as a purchase of a financial asset, namely the accounts receivable. A non-recourse factor assumes the "credit risk" that an account will not collect due solely to the financial inability of account debtor to pay. In the United States, if the factor does not assume the credit risk on the purchased accounts, in most cases a court will recharacterize the transaction as a secured loan.

When a company decides to factor accounts receivable invoices to a principal factor or broker, it needs to understand the risks and rewards involved with factoring. The amount of funding can vary depending on the specific accounts receivable, the debtor, and the industry in which the factoring occurs. Factors can limit and restrict funding in such occasions where the debtor is found not credit worthy, or the invoice amount represents too big of a portion of the business's annual income. Another area of concern is when the cost of invoice factoring is calculated. It is a combination of an administration charge and interest earned over time as the debtor takes time to repay the original invoice. Not all factoring companies charge interest over the period it takes to collect from a debtor; in these cases, only the administration charge needs to be taken into account, although this type of facility is comparatively rare. There are major industries that stand out in the factoring industry are:

1. Distribution 2. Retail 3. Manufacturing 4. Transportation 5. Services 6. Construction

== Common factoring terms ==
=== Discount rate or factoring fee ===
The discount rate is the fee a factoring company charges to provide the factoring service. Since a formal factoring transaction involves the outright purchase of the invoice, the discount rate is typically stated as a percentage of the face value of the invoices. For instance, a factoring company may charge 5% for an invoice due in 45 days. In contrast, companies that do accounts receivable financing may charge per week or per month. Thus, an invoice financing company that charges 1% per week would result in a discount rate of 6–7% for the same invoice.

=== Advance rate ===
The advance rate is the percentage of an invoice that is paid out by the factoring company upfront. The difference between the face value of the invoice and the advance rates serves to protect factors against any losses and to ensure coverage for their fees. Once the invoice is paid, the factor gives the difference between the face value, advance amount and fees back to the business in the form of a factoring rebate.

=== Reserve account ===
Whereas the difference between the invoice face value and the advance serves as a reserve for a specific invoice, many factors also hold an ongoing reserve account which serves to further reduce the risk for the factoring company. This reserve account is typically 10–15% of the seller's credit line, but not all factoring companies hold reserve accounts.

=== Long-term contracts and minimums ===
While factoring fees and terms range widely, many factoring companies will have monthly minimums and require a long-term contract as a measure to guarantee a profitable relationship. Although shorter contract periods are now becoming more common, contracts and monthly minimums are typical with "whole ledger" factoring, which entails factoring all of a company's invoices or all of the company's invoices from a particular debtor.

=== Spot factoring ===
Spot factoring, or single invoice discounting, is an alternative to "whole ledger" and allows a company to factor a single invoice. The added flexibility for the business, and lack of predictable volume and monthly minimums for factoring providers means that spot factoring transactions usually carry a cost premium.

== Treatment under GAAP ==
In the United States, under the Generally Accepted Accounting Principles (GAAP), receivables are considered "sold", under FASB ASC 860-10 (or under Statement of Financial Accounting Standards No. 140, paragraph 112), when the buyer has "no recourse". Moreover, to treat the transaction as a sale under GAAP, the seller's monetary liability under any "recourse" provision must be readily estimated at the time of the sale. Otherwise, the financial transaction is treated as a secured loan, with the receivables used as collateral.

When a nonrecourse transaction takes place, the accounts receivable balance is removed from the statement of financial position. The corresponding debits include the expense recorded on the income statement and the proceeds received from the factor.

== History ==
Factoring as a fact of business life was underway in England prior to 1400, and it came to America with the Pilgrims, around 1620. It appears to be closely related to early merchant banking activities. The latter however evolved by extension to non-trade related financing such as sovereign debt. Like all financial instruments, factoring evolved over centuries. This was driven by changes in the organization of companies; technology, particularly air travel and non-face-to-face communications technologies starting with the telegraph, followed by the telephone and then computers. These also drove and were driven by modifications of the common law framework in England and the United States.

Governments were latecomers to the facilitation of trade financed by factors. English common law originally held that unless the debtor was notified, the assignment between the seller of invoices and the factor was not valid. The Canadian Federal Government legislation governing the assignment of moneys owed by it still reflects this stance as does provincial government legislation modelled after it. As late as the current century, the courts have heard arguments that without notification of the debtor the assignment was not valid. In the United States, by 1949 the majority of state governments had adopted a rule that the debtor did not have to be notified, thus opening up the possibility of non-notification factoring arrangements.

Originally the industry took physical possession of the goods, provided cash advances to the producer, financed the credit extended to the buyer and insured the credit strength of the buyer. In England the control over the trade thus obtained resulted in an Act of Parliament in 1696 to mitigate the monopoly power of the factors. With the development of larger firms who built their own sales forces, distribution channels, and knowledge of the financial strength of their customers, the needs for factoring services were reshaped and the industry became more specialized.

By the twentieth century in the United States factoring was still the predominant form of financing working capital for the then-high-growth-rate textile industry. In part this occurred because of the structure of the US banking system with its myriad of small banks and consequent limitations on the amount that could be advanced prudently by any one of them to a firm. In Canada, with its national banks the limitations were far less restrictive and thus factoring did not develop as widely as in the US. Even then, factoring also became the dominant form of financing in the Canadian textile industry.

By the first decade of the 21st century, a basic public policy rationale for factoring remains that the product is well-suited to the demands of innovative, rapidly growing firms critical to economic growth. A second public policy rationale is allowing fundamentally good business to be spared the costly, time-consuming trials and tribulations of bankruptcy protection for suppliers, employees and customers or to provide a source of funds during the process of restructuring the firm so that it can survive and grow.

== Modern forms ==
In the latter half of the twentieth century the introduction of computers eased the accounting burdens of factors and then small firms. The same occurred for their ability to obtain information about debtor's creditworthiness. Introduction of the Internet and the web has accelerated the process while reducing costs. Today credit information and insurance coverage are instantly available online. The web has also made it possible for factors and their clients to collaborate in real time on collections. Acceptance of signed documents provided by facsimile as being legally binding has eliminated the need for physical delivery of "originals", thereby reducing time delays for entrepreneurs.

Traditionally, factoring has been a relationship driven business and factoring transactions have been largely manual and frequently involving a face to-face component as part of the relationship building process or due-diligence phase. This is especially true for small business factoring, in which the factoring companies tend to be locally or regionally focused. The geographic focus helps them better mitigate risks that because of their smaller scale, they otherwise couldn't afford to take.

To make the arrangement economically profitable, most factoring companies have revenue minimums (e.g. at least $500,000 in annual revenue) and require annual contracts and monthly minimums. More recently, several online factoring companies have emerged, leveraging aggregation, analytics, automation to deliver the benefits of factoring with the convenience and ease afforded by the internet. Some companies use technology to automate some of the risk and back-office aspects of factoring and provide the service via a modern web interface for additional convenience. This enables them to serve a broader range of small businesses with significantly lower revenue requirements without the need for monthly minimums and long-term contracts. Many of these companies have direct software integrations with software programs such as Quickbooks, allowing businesses to immediately receive funding without an application.

The emergence of these modern forms has not been without controversy. Critics accurately point out that none of these new players have experienced a complete credit cycle and thus, their underwriting models have not been market tested by an economic contraction. What's more, some of these new models rely on a market place lending format. It's unclear if this source of capital will be stable over time, as other companies, most notably, Lending Club, had a difficult time attracting investors in early 2016, even though net returns seem higher on invoice finance platforms such as MarketInvoice and FundThrough than on business loan platforms such as Funding Circle.

== Specialized factoring ==
With advances in technology, some invoice factoring providers have adapted to specific industries. This often affects additional services offered by the factor in order to best adapt the factoring service to the needs of the business. An example of this includes a recruitment specialist factor offering payroll and back office support with the factoring facility; a wholesale or /distribution factor may not offer this additional service. These differences can affect the cost of the facility, the approach the factor takes when collecting credit, the administration services included in the facility and the maximum size of invoices which can be factored.

=== Real estate ===
Since the 2007 United States recession one of the fastest-growing sectors in the factoring industry is real estate commission advances. Commission advances work the same way as factoring but are done with licensed real estate agents on their pending and future real estate commissions. Commission advances were first introduced in Canada but quickly spread to the United States. Typically, the process consists of an online application from a real estate agent, who signs a contract selling future commissions at a discount; the factoring company then wires the funds to the agent's bank account.

=== Medical factoring ===
The healthcare industry makes for a special case in which factoring is much needed because of long payment cycles from government, private insurance companies and other third party payers, but difficult because of HIPAA requirements. For this reasons medical receivables factoring companies have developed to specifically target this niche.

=== Construction ===
Factoring is commonplace in the construction industry because of the long payment cycles that can stretch to 120 days and beyond. However, the construction industry has features that are risky for factoring companies. Because of the risks and exposure from mechanics' liens, danger of "paid-when-paid" terms, existence of progress billing, use of withholding, and exposure to economic cycles most "generalist" factoring companies avoid construction receivables entirely. That has created another niche of factoring companies that specialize in construction receivables.

=== Haulage ===
Factoring is often used by haulage companies to cover upfront expenses, such as fuel. Factoring companies that cater to this niche offer services to help accommodate drivers on the road, including the ability to verify invoices and fund on copies sent via scan, fax or email, and the option to place the funds directly onto a fuel card, which works like a debit card. Haulage factors also offer fuel advance programs that provide a cash advance to carriers upon confirmed pickup of the load.

=== Recruitment ===
In the recruitment sector factoring is an effective solution, often used by temporary recruitment agencies who must ensure that their business has the available funds each week to make payment to the workers they have placed.

== Invoice payers (debtors) ==
Large firms and organizations such as governments usually have specialized processes to deal with one aspect of factoring, redirection of payment to the factor following receipt of notification from the third party (i.e., the factor) to whom they will make the payment. Many but not all in such organizations are knowledgeable about the use of factoring by small firms and clearly distinguish between its use by small rapidly growing firms and turnarounds.

Distinguishing between assignment of the responsibility to perform the work and the assignment of funds to the factor is central to the customer or debtor's processes. Firms have purchased from a supplier for a reason and thus insist on that firm fulfilling the work commitment. Once the work has been performed, however, it is a matter of indifference who is paid. For example, General Electric has clear processes to be followed which distinguish between their work and payment sensitivities. Contracts direct with the US government require an assignment of claims, which is an amendment to the contract allowing for payments to third parties (factors).

== Risks ==
Risks to a factor include:

- Counter-party credit risk related to clients and risk-covered debtors. Risk-covered debtors can be reinsured, which limit the risks of a factor. Trade receivables are a fairly low-risk asset due to their short duration.
- External fraud by clients: fake invoicing, misdirected payments, pre-invoicing, not assigned credit notes, etc. A fraud insurance policy and subjecting the client to audit could limit the risks.
- Legal, compliance and tax risks: large number of applicable laws and regulations in different countries
- Operational risks, such as contractual disputes
- Uniform Commercial Code (UCC-1) securing rights to assets.
- IRS liens associated with payroll taxes, etc.
- ICT risks: complicated, integrated factoring system, extensive data exchange with client

== Reverse factoring ==
In reverse factoring or supply-chain finance, the buyer sells its debt to the factor. That way, the buyer secures the financing of the invoice, and the supplier gets a better interest rate.

== See also ==
- Capital formation
- Invoice discounting
