= Dividend stripping =

Form of tax avoidance

Dividend stripping (also known as dividend arbitrage) is the practice of buying shares a short period before a dividend is declared, called cum-dividend, and then selling them when they go ex-dividend, when the previous owner is entitled to the dividend. On the day the company trades ex-dividend, theoretically the share price drops by the amount of the dividend.

This transaction may be done by an ordinary investor as an investment strategy, or used as a foundation for complex tax avoidance (such as cum-cum trading) or tax fraud (such as cum-ex trading) schemes by a company's owners or associates.

== Investors ==
For an investor, dividend stripping provides dividend income, and a capital loss when the shares fall in value (in normal circumstances) on going ex-dividend. This may be profitable if income is greater than the loss, or if the tax treatment of the two gives an advantage.

Different tax circumstances of different investors is a factor. A tax advantage available to everyone would be expected to show up in the ex-dividend price fall. But an advantage available only to a limited set of investors might not.

In any case, the amount of profit on such a transaction is usually small, meaning that it may not be worthwhile after brokerage fees, the risk of holding shares overnight, the market spread, or possible slippage if the market lacks liquidity.

== Tax avoidance ==
Dividend stripping can be used as a tax avoidance strategy, enabling a company to distribute profits to its owners as a capital sum, instead of a dividend, which offers tax benefits if the effective tax rate on capital gains is lower than for dividends. For example, consider a company called ProfCo wishing to distribute D, with the help of a stripper company called StripperCo.

1. StripperCo buys ProfCo shares from their present owners for X+D.
2. ProfCo, now owned by StripperCo, declares a dividend of D, which is paid to StripperCo.
3. StripperCo sells its shares back to the owners for X.

The net effect for the owners is a capital gain of +D and a dividend distribution of -D. The net effect for StripperCo is nothing; the dividend it receives is income, and its loss on the share trading is a deduction. StripperCo might need to be in the business of share trading to get such a deduction (i.e. treating shares as merchandise instead of capital assets).

Many variations are possible:

- StripperCo might buy different "class B" shares in ProfCo for just the D amount, not the whole of ProfCo.
- Such class B shares could have their rights changed by ProfCo, rendering them worthless, instead of StripperCo selling them back.
- ProfCo might lend money to StripperCo for the transaction, instead of the latter needing bridging finance.

The tax treatment for each party in an exercise like this will vary from country to country. The operation may well be caught at some point by tax laws, and/or provide no benefit.

== Cum-Ex and Cum-Cum Trading ==
Cum-ex and cum-cum trading are two forms of dividend stripping that involve specific arrangements around dividend payment dates to exploit rules governing dividend withholding tax (WHT). Both names derive from Latin, where cum means 'with' and ex means 'without' (referring to the dividend).

- Cum-Cum Trading focuses on tax avoidance by exploiting differences in withholding tax rates between countries. Shares are temporarily transferred (cum-dividend) from an owner in a high WHT jurisdiction to a party in a low or zero WHT jurisdiction just before the dividend is paid. The lower-tax party collects the dividend and receives a favourable or full WHT refund/credit. The shares are then returned, with the resulting tax gain shared. This practice reduces the tax bill, which is considered aggressive tax avoidance and is increasingly targeted by anti-avoidance laws.
- Cum-Ex Trading focuses on tax fraud by exploiting settlement and clearing ambiguities around the ex-dividend date to allow multiple claims for a single WHT payment. The rapid trading of shares cum-dividend and their settlement ex-dividend creates confusion over the true legal owner and their right to the WHT refund, effectively causing the state to refund tax that was only paid once. This scheme is illegal and has led to massive financial losses for European treasuries, as exposed by the CumEx-Files.

== Australia ==
In Australia, ordinary external investors are free to buy shares cum-dividend and sell them ex-dividend, and treat the dividend income and capital loss the same as for any other investment. But schemes involving a deliberate arrangement by a company's owners to avoid tax are addressed by anti-avoidance provisions of Part IVA the Income Tax Assessment Act 1936.

=== Investors ===
Dividend stripping by investors has the general advantages or disadvantages described above, but in addition in Australia there are franking credits attached to dividends under the dividend imputation system. Those credits can only be used by eligible investors (see the dividend imputation article), so there's a tension between different investors for the amount shares should fall when going ex-dividend. A rationally priced drop for one group is a bonus or trading opportunity for the other.

But the difference is not large. In a franked dividend, each $0.70 cash has $0.30 of franking attached (at the 30% company tax rate for 2005). To eligible investors it's worth $1.00, to others it's worth only $0.70 (of before-tax income in both cases). A typical half-yearly dividend (in 2005) of 2% of the share price would mean an extra 0.85% in franking credits, an amount which might easily be swamped by brokerage and the general risks noted above.

=== Tax avoidance ===
The kind of dividend stripping tax avoidance schemes described above presently fall under anti-avoidance provisions of the Income Tax Assessment Act part IVA amendments introduced in 1981.

Part IVA is a set of general anti-avoidance measures addressing schemes with a dominant purpose of creating a tax benefit. Section 177E specifically covers dividend stripping. That section exists to avoid any difficulty that might arise from identifying exactly where a tax benefit arises in dividend stripping. Dividend stripping will generally result in money to owners being taxed as dividends, irrespective of interposed steps.

Section 177E also applies to related schemes which draw off profits from a company, benefitting its owners, not just to the formal payment of a dividend. For example,

- The stripper receiving a non-recoverable loan, instead of a dividend from the target company.
- The stripper selling a worthless asset to the company.
- Owners (without a separate stripper) selling a part interest in an asset to the company, but later changing the terms to reduce its value.

Losses in the company for such related schemes may be recognised immediately in its accounts, or only booked progressively over future years, the latter being various "forward stripping" schemes. Both are caught by section 177E.

=== Sources ===
- Income Tax Assessment Act 1936, Part IVA (inserted 1981) , in particular section 177E . And the explanatory memorandum ,.
- Australian Taxation Office taxation determination TD 95/37 (1995)
- Australian Taxation Office taxpayer alert TA 2004/3 (2004)

== United States ==
In the United States, dividends may qualify for a lower rate. However, among other things, the stock must be owned for more than 60 days out of a 121-day period around the ex-dividend date.

== See also ==
- Asset stripping
- Rational pricing § Shares
- The CumEx-Files are a 2018 investigative report that made public a decade long dividend stripping tax-avoidance scheme in which several European countries incurred tax loss damages totaling more than 60 billion Euros
