= SKAT (tax agency) =

- SKATs logo

Agency overview
- Formed: 1 November 2005 (fusion of Told & Skat and local tax authorities)
- Dissolved: 1 July 2018
- Jurisdiction: Government of Denmark
- Agency executive: Minister for Taxation
- Parent agency: Ministry of Taxation
- Website: Official website

SKAT (lit. 'Tax') was the tax authority of Denmark from 2005 until its reorganization in 2018 as a result of several serious scandals. It had been the state authority under which the Danish Treasury calculated and collected taxes and levied charges. The authority also undertook property valuation and settlement of debts.

SKAT was organized into different core units and 30 local tax centers. Tax Centers are located across the country although Danish citizens can in principle apply to any tax center. There were also 22 customs operations. SKAT had been created by the merger of the National Customs and Tax Administration and the municipal tax administrations.

From 1 July 2018, Skatteforvaltningen took over the responsibilities of the former SKAT, and Skatteforvaltningen became a group of 7 different tax agencies with specific areas and functions, with the agencies continuing to share the skat.dk website.

== History ==
=== 2019 Copenhagen tax office bombing ===
In August 2019, a powerful bomb detonated and damaged a tax office building in Copenhagen and one person was wounded by splinters. Swedish citizens Nurettin Nuray Syuleyman and Zacharias Tamer Hamzi were found guilty by Copenhagen City Court, sentenced to a prison sentence and thereafter permanently banned from returning to Denmark.

== Closing ==
Following a number of serious scandals that plagued SKAT between 2000 and 2016, it was decided on 12 June 2017, to close SKAT in 2018, instead creating seven new agencies with specialized areas.

== See also ==
- CumEx-Files
- Sanjay Shah
- Hanno Berger (de)
- Macquarie Group
