= Kriya (company) =

British business finance lender

- Formerly: MarketFinance, MarketInvoice
- Type: Private
- Founded: January 2011; 15 years ago
- Founders: Anil Stocker, Ilya Kondrashov, Charles Delingpole
- Headquarters: 15 Worship Street, London EC2A 2DT, United Kingdom
- Key people: Anil Stocker (CEO)
- Website: https://www.kriya.co

Kriya (formerly MarketFinance Limited and Market Invoice Limited), is a British fintech company specialising in credit and payment products for small businesses, as well as embedded finance solutions. It is described as a FinTech company. In October 2025, Kriya was 100% acquired by Allica Bank, a leading UK digital bank focused on established businesses.

== Description ==
Founded by Anil Stocker, together with two cofounders he met at Cambridge University, the company is based in London. To date, it has advanced approximately £4 billion of business credit to UK SMEs through invoice finance, business loans, line of credit, and embedded PayLater. Through Kriya’s embedded PayLater - a product Kriya launched in 2022, small businesses can select to “Pay with Kriya” at check-out, giving them deferred terms to settle their payments.

Kriya has supported businesses across many sectors including construction, consultancy, food and drink, wholesalers to large high-street retailers, IT and tech services, media, advertising, professional services, jewellery, and exporters. Kriya has partnered with Barclays Bank to deliver digital invoice finance to its banking customers. Kriya has also successfully worked with the British Business Bank and has embedded finance partnerships with Halfords Plc and Stripe.

Kriya also played a role in channeling Covid Loans (“CBILS”) to small businesses during the Covid pandemic, advancing over £250m to businesses through their digital loans product.

Kriya was 100% acquired by Allica Bank on 21 October 2025.

== History ==
Anil Stocker has served as CEO & Cofounder since the company began in 2011. Former Cofounders are Ilya Kondrashov and Charles Delingpole. The first lending product was a digital invoice finance offering that helped small businesses with cash flow as they were waiting for large invoice payments from blue-chip customers.

In 2013 the British Business Bank began funding businesses through their platform. In 2015 the company raised its first venture capital funding. In 2017 and 2018 MarketInvoice launched a business loans and line of credit product. On 12 November 2019, MarketInvoice was renamed to MarketFinance to reflect its move into broader financial products such as business loans.

On 23 September 2020 MarketFinance (now known as Kriya) was awarded a £10m grant from the Banking & Competition Remedies Fund to expand its services to sole traders and through key partnerships, also adding more jobs at the company.

In 2021 the company was accredited under the British government response to the COVID-19 pandemic (Recovery Loan Scheme (RLS)). It was also accredited under the Coronavirus Business Interruption Loan Scheme (CBILS), having lent £250m under the scheme to SMEs across the UK. In November 2022 the company was renamed to Kriya as it launched its embedded finance offering. The name Kriya denotes being in a state of flow and was chosen to match the company’s aim to get business flowing by developing innovative PayLater products embedded at the point of sale between businesses. Kriya also announced Michael Woodburn (former COO at Capital One) as Chairman.

On 5 December 2023, Kriya announced that Halfords Plc, the UK’s largest leading provider of motoring and cycling products and services had selected Kriya to power their payments and credit for its trade account customers. On 26 September 2024, it was announced that Stripe would integrate Kriya as a business payment method on Stripe check-out.

On 21 October 2025 it was announced that 100% of Kriya had been acquired by Allica Bank - a leading UK fintech bank focused on established SMEs in the UK. The transaction would see Kriya becoming a key part of Allica’s credit offering to SMEs, and marked Allica’s entry into embedded finance. Under Allica’s ownership, Kriya will invest further into its digital lending products, embedded finance options and European expansion. Through Allica, Kriya will have access to lower cost funding that is highly scalable, allowing Kriya to help more businesses and do even more lending.

== Financing ==
Kriya has raised over £50m in equity funding from leading venture capital firms such as Northzone and strategic investors such as Barclays Bank and Santander’s Fintech Fund (Mouro Capital).

Being a non-bank lender, Kriya has sourced debt finance from leading asset managers such as Viola Credit and banks such as Deutsche Bank, Intesa Sanpaolo and Banco BNI Europa.

In October 2025 Kriya was acquired by Allica Bank.

== Products and customers ==
Kriya supports SMEs turning over from £1m to £50m in annual turnover with a range of lending products. Through its embedded finance offering, Kriya partners with large corporations (like Halfords and Stripe) to offer PayLater payment options for small business buyers (including sole traders).

Together with Allica, Kriya will focus on its digital invoice finance and embedded finance products, as well as develop new credit products. Kriya aims to expand into Europe with Allica’s backing and bank infrastructure.
