= Ministry of Taxation (Denmark) =

Government ministry of Denmark

Danish Ministry of Taxation
- Skatteministeriet
- Coat of arms of Denmark

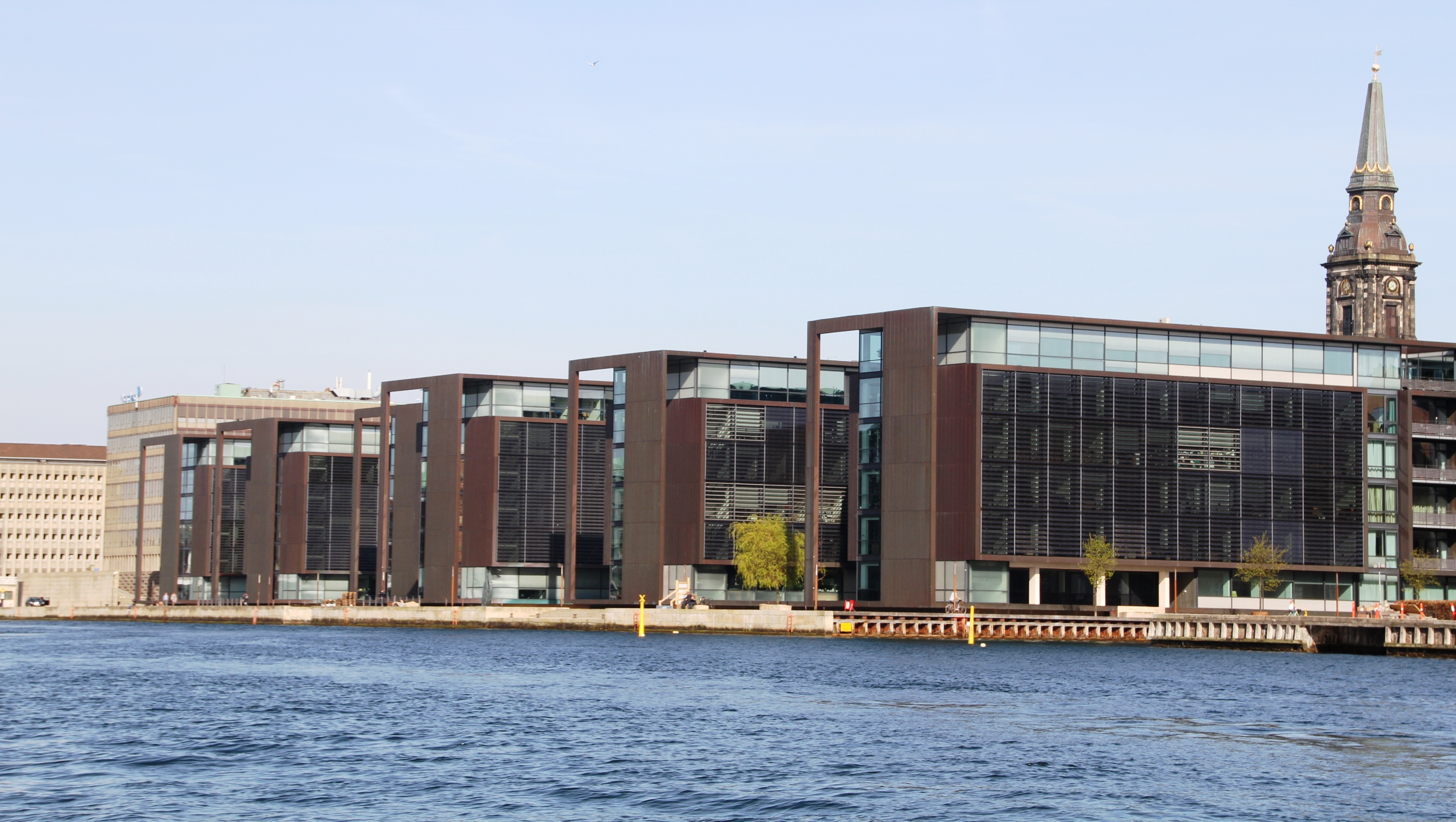

Agency overview
- Formed: 1975; 51 years ago
- Jurisdiction: Kingdom of Denmark
- Headquarters: Copenhagen
- Agency executive: Jakob Engel-Schmidt, Minister of Taxation and Growth
- Website: www.skm.dk

The Danish Ministry of Taxation (Danish: Skatteministeriet) is a Ministry, headed by the Danish Tax Minister. The responsibilities of the ministry includes supporting the Tax Minister, and collecting taxes and tolls in Denmark. It was created in 1975 as a separation from the Ministry of Finance.

== Organisation ==
The Ministry of Taxation is structured as such:

- Ministry
  - Department
  - Danish Gambling Authority
  - Danish Tax Appeals Agency
  - Tax administration
    - Danish Debt Collection Agency
    - Danish Property Assessment Agency
    - Danish Tax Agency
    - Danish Customs Agency
    - Danish Motor Vehicle Agency
    - IT and Development Agency
    - Administration and Services Agency

== See also ==
- Taxation in Denmark
