= Trine Bramsen =

Danish politician (born 1981)

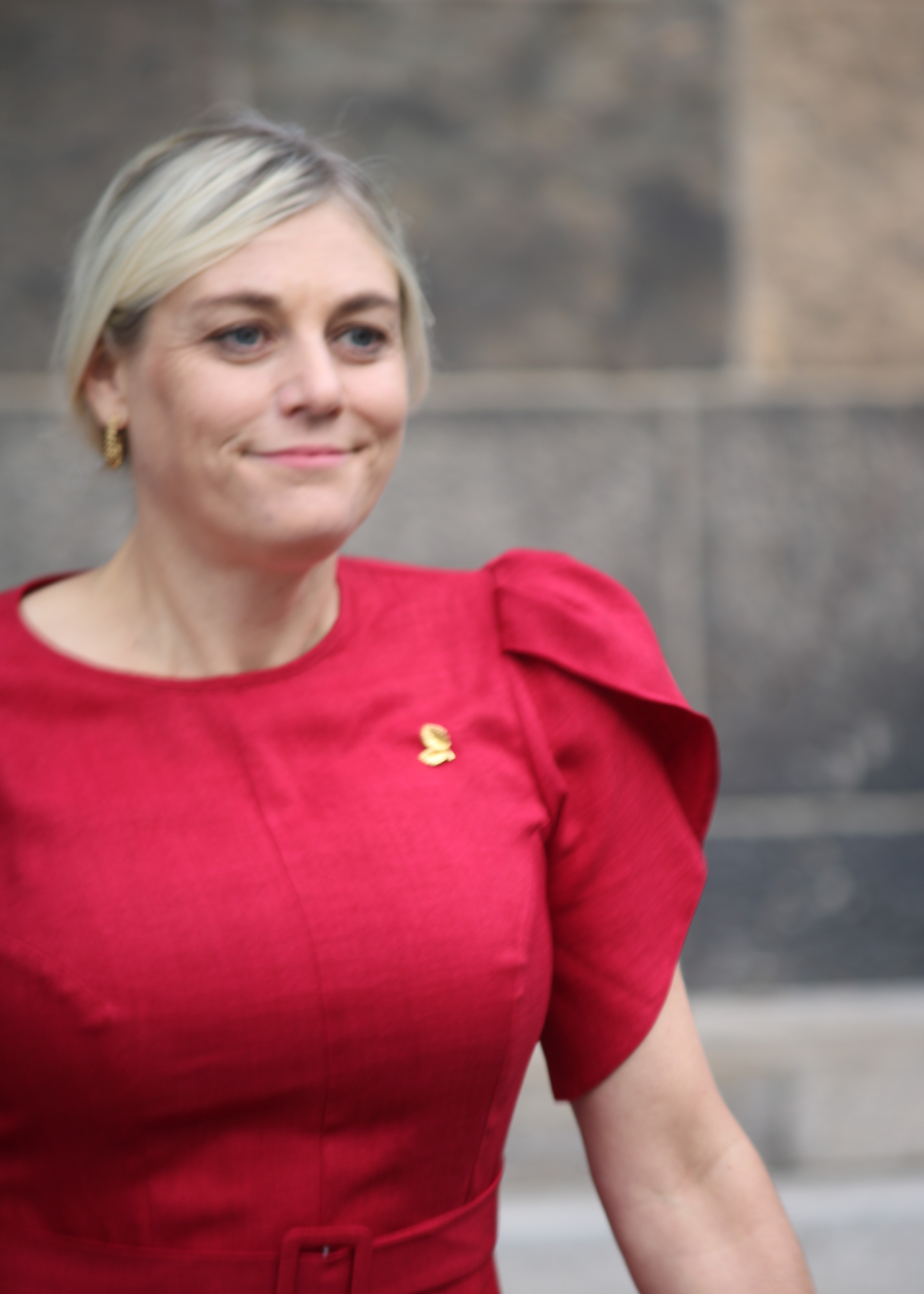
- Bramsen in 2025

Minister of Transport
- In office 4 February 2022 – 15 December 2022
- Prime Minister: Mette Frederiksen
- Preceded by: Benny Engelbrecht
- Succeeded by: Thomas Danielsen

Minister of Defence
- In office 27 June 2019 – 4 February 2022
- Prime Minister: Mette Frederiksen
- Preceded by: Claus Hjort Frederiksen
- Succeeded by: Morten Bødskov

Member of the Folketing
- Incumbent
- Assumed office 15 September 2011
- Constituency: Funen

Personal details
- Born: 26 March 1981 (age 45) Svendborg, Denmark
- Party: Social Democrats
- Education: Roskilde University

Trine Bramsen (born 26 March 1981) is a Danish politician of the Social Democrats, who has been a member of the Folketing since 2011. She served as minister of transport from February to December 2022 and minister of defence from 2019 until February 2022.

== Early and personal life ==
Bramsen was born in Svendborg to schoolteachers Bo Steffen Madsen and Lene Bramsen Madsen. She worked as a consultant with Deloitte from 2007 until 2011.

== Political career ==
=== Parliament ===
Bramsen was first elected member of Folketinget for the Social Democrats in the 2011 election, where she received 4,497 votes. She was reelected in 2015 with 8,337 votes and again in 2019 with 10,594 votes.

=== Minister of Defence ===
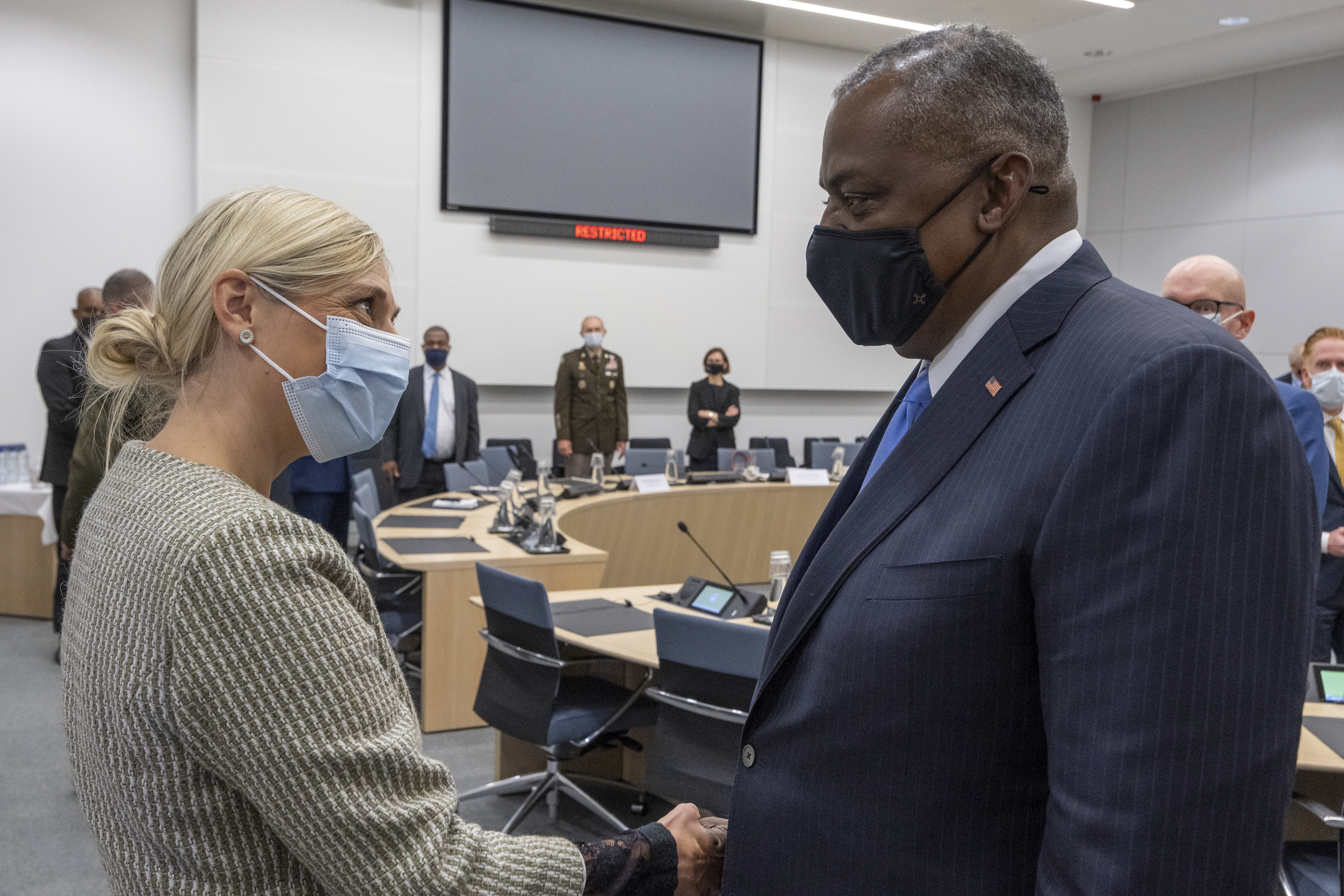
Bramsen with U.S. Secretary of Defense Lloyd Austin in Brussels, 21 October 2021

Bramsen was appointed Minister of Defence in the cabinet of Prime Minister Mette Frederiksen on 27 June 2019.

Early in her tenure, she oversaw the addition of about 700 soldiers, a frigate and four fighter jets to NATO forces. Following the 2020 Iranian attack on U.S. forces in Iraq, she temporarily moved some of its military personnel for the international military intervention against ISIL from the Al Asad Airbase to Kuwait.

Following revelations by the DR in May 2021, that Denmark had aided the NSA in spying on ally countries, Bramsen stated that "systematic wiretapping of close allies is unacceptable".

After two Russian fighter jets flew into Danish airspace in June 2021, Bramsen called it “a deliberate provocation by Russia”, further stating the fighters were warned that they were entering Danish airspace. She also warned that “it is a clear sign that they are willing to break every rule” and that “we can’t afford to be naive”.

Bramsen warned that Denmark would withdraw their soldiers from Mali if the country’s authorities were to seek negotiations with Russian mercenaries to combat Islamic extremist groups. Speaking to Jyllands-Posten in late September 2021, she iterated that Denmark would not negotiate with mercenaries, and that there was a clear red line.

== Controversy ==
Bramsen was the IT and telecommunications spokesperson for the Social Democrats, when she replied to a comment by the IT-Political Association of Denmark in a debate about electronic elections wherein participants are identified with chips. Bramsen argued in favour of the electronic elections, which she perceived as feasible, even though the Association with technical industry experience was in opposition. She wrote an article titled A call for IT nerds: Stop wearing tennis socks — and speak so that we can understand you!. The article was met with criticism for its tone. As a result, she was reassigned to be a spokesperson on justice. In her new position, she argued for making The Onion Router illegal.

In 2020 Bramsen exposed a secret agreement with the US, made during the tenures of Bill Clinton and Poul Nyrup Rasmussen and signed by subsequent Danish defense ministers, allowing American authorities to tap Danish phone cables. In 2021 MP Søren Espersen called for her resignation, for disrespecting the Chief of Defence, by calling her an ”agency leader”. In addition, she received criticism for poor planning of the mission with Esbern Snare in November 2021 (a part of Danish counter-piracy efforts), which led to the pirate Lucky Francis coming to Denmark.

In 2025, 3 years after she had left her post as Minister of Defence, the Auditor general criticised her, and subsequent defence ministers, for inadequate security at 18 military bases.

Political offices
Preceded by Claus Hjort Frederiksen	Minister of Defence; 2019–2022	Succeeded by Morten Bødskov
Preceded by Benny Engelbrecht	Minister of Transport; 2022	Succeeded by Thomas Danielsen
