= Danish counter-piracy strategy =

Danish shipping's counter-piracy strategy is necessary as Denmark operates one of the world's five largest shipping nations in terms of operated fleet, controlling around 10% of global shipping. At any given time, there are approximately 70 Danish-controlled ships in the Indian Ocean and 30 ships in the Gulf of Guinea. This makes piracy in these areas a significant concern for the Danish shipping industry and for the Danish state. In 2012, when Somali piracy was at its height, the piracy cost of Danish shipping was estimated to be between 130 and 260 million Euros.

== Danish counter-piracy strategy ==
When the Danish merchant vessel Danica White was hijacked by Somali pirates in 2007, piracy began to garner more public attention and in the three months following the hijacking, Danish newspapers published more than 600 articles on piracy in relation to Danica White. The attention meant that the Danish shipping industry was able to pressure the Danish government into getting involved in counter-piracy operations. In 2007 the Danish government included counter-piracy in its strategic white paper for the first time. The Danish Ministry of Foreign Affairs (MFA) has published several priority papers outlining Danish counter-piracy measures and expressing an interest in ensuring freedom of navigation and in protecting Danish-controlled ships and their seafarers. In the priority paper covering the period of 2019–22, the MFA identifies the Gulf of Guinea and the Horn of Africa as being at the centre of Denmark's attention, due to the large Danish presence.

In addition to the naval focus of the strategy, the also priority paper declares that Denmark wants to engage in capacity-building initiatives designed to complement military engagements. Notably, Denmark has established a Peace and Stability Program for the Gulf of Guinea. Among its various projects, the program aims to enhance coordination and administration between the Danish, Nigerian, and Ghanaian coast guards, navies, local ports, and judicial systems through training and dialogue.

The priority paper also states that Denmark will promote maritime security and will execute its piracy engagements in accordance with international organizations, eg. UN, UNODC, IMO and regional security architectures, eg. ECOWAS and Yaoundé Code of Conduct.

The priority paper further states that the objective of Denmark's efforts to combat piracy and maritime crime is “to reduce the threat stemming from these issues in order to protect Danish interests and seafarers as well as international shipping”. The wish to protect Danish shipping interests has led Denmark to contribute to the international counter-piracy effort in Somalia since 2008, including a naval mission between 2008 and 2015. Since 2015, increasing priority has been given to the maritime security situation in the Gulf of Guinea.

From 2021-2022 the Danish frigate Esbern Snarre equipped with a Seahawk combat helicopter was deployed in the Gulf of Guinea with the mission to perform surveillance, area protection, and escorting.

Furthermore, shortly after implementing the anti-piracy strategy, the Danish government in 2021 appointed Ambassador Jakob Brix-Tange as Special Representative for Maritime Security for the first time, aiming to build alliances and strengthen cooperation between global partners and industry in the Gulf of Guinea.

Several of the commitments and initiatives of the previous Danish anti-piracy strategy from 2019-2022 are expected to be continued until 2027. With an annual budget of 10.9 to 25 mil. DKK from 2024-2027 the Danish government wants to extend its engagement in capacity building, maritime governance, local surveillance training and collaboration on prosecution reforms in West Africa and the Gulf of Guinea.

== Best management practices and industry cooperation ==
Danish merchant vessels are required to comply with the Best Management Practices (BMP), which are a set of international guidelines that prescribe precautionary measures for when sailing in piracy-prone areas. In response to the growing threat of piracy off the coast of Somalia, the shipping industry, in collaboration with the International Maritime Organization (IMO) and the Contact Group on Piracy off the Coast of Somalia (CGPCS) developed its first Best Management Practices (BMPs) in February 2009. The third version of the BMP, published in June 2010, defined the High Risk Area (HRA) for the first time. The HRA is a specific area in the Indian Ocean where piracy attacks have taken place, meaning that there is a higher risk of being attacked and that the BMP should be applied here. The fundamental requirements of the BMP are that shipping companies understand the threat and obtain current information, that they conduct risk assessments and identify ship protection measures and implement these. They must also follow flag state and military guidance, register with the Maritime Security Centre Horn of Africa (MSCHOA) and report to the United Kingdom Marine Trade Operations (UKMTO) as well as cooperate with other shipping companies, military forces, law enforcement and welfare providers.

Controlling ships’ compliance with the BMP has been a key aspect of the Danish counter-piracy efforts. As a consequence, Danish ships have since 2012 been required to register and report their sailing in the HRA to the MSCHOA and to the UKMTO as well as comply with the BMP recommendations. The Danish authorities will investigate Danish ships that they suspect have not followed the recommendations. Generally, Danish ships comply with the BMPs despite piracy off the coast of Somalia declining, indicating that the Danish authorities were successful in promoting the BMP. The CGPCS and the Shared Awareness and De-confliction (SHADE) military coordination platform have ensured cooperation between state and private actors in the development of the BMPs. The trade and employer organization Danish Shipping has been able to provide input to the development of the BMP through participation in the CGPCS.

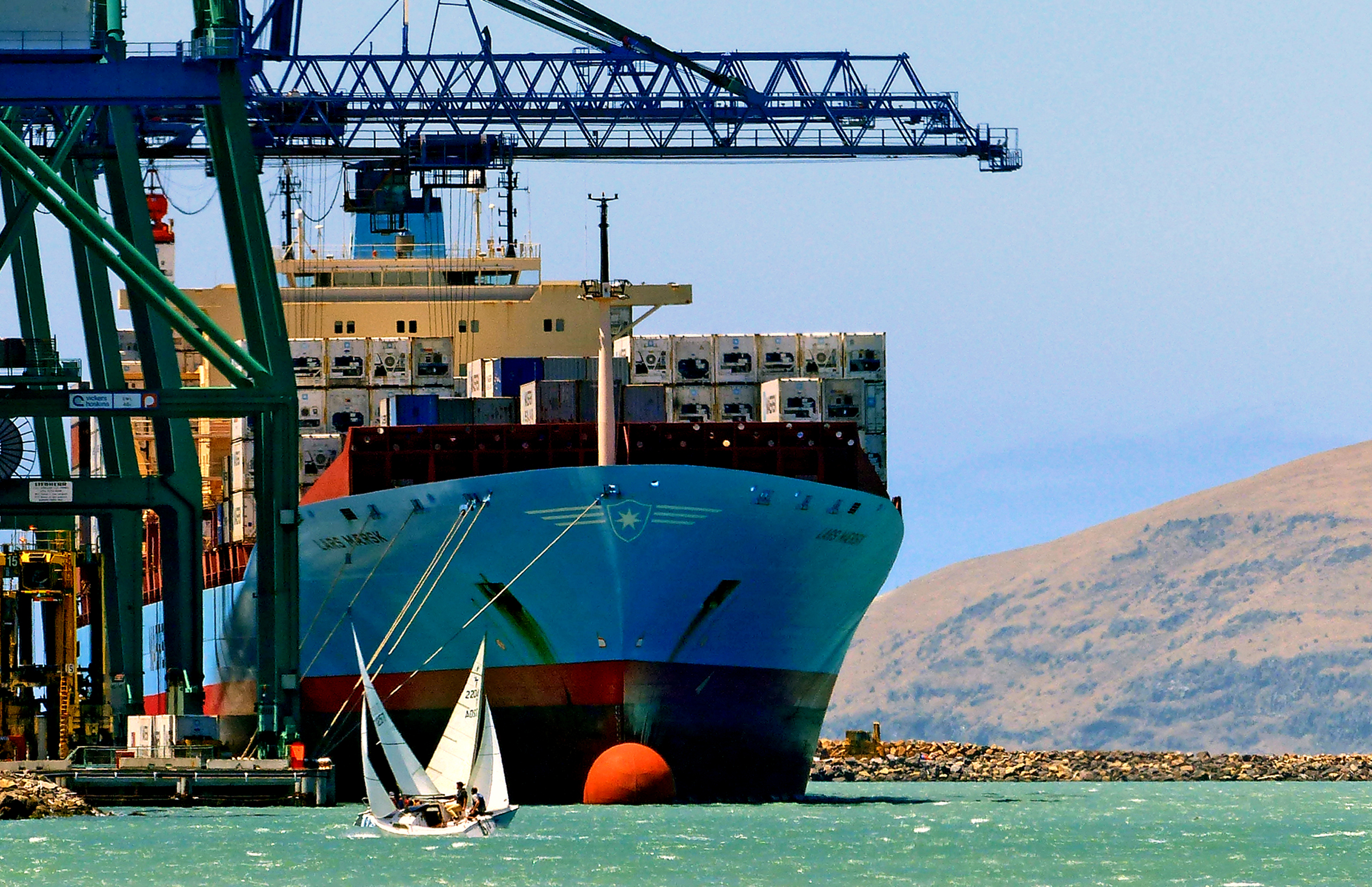
The Danish-flagged Lars Mærsk. The container shipping line Mærsk is the world's largest shipping company and has been vocal about the need for protecting merchant vessels in the Gulf of Guinea

== PCASP on board Danish-flagged vessels ==
In the first three editions of the BMP, they only advised the use of passive, unarmed defence measures aboard, warning against the presence of firearms. Yet, as piracy incidents increased – particularly in the Indian Ocean – the industry reconsidered and in February 2011 the International Chamber of Shipping (ICS) approved the use of armed guards. Although the IMO does not take a position on the carriage of arms on board ships, this change was acknowledged by the IMO by August 2011, meaning that the BMPs no longer discourage the use of armed personnel. Due to the shipping industry's demands for safe seas, the use of Privately Contracted Armed Security Personnel (PCASP) have since become the default approach to vessel protection worldwide. In addition to promoting international BMPs, the Danish government began collaborating with the shipping industry with the aim of developing legislation that would allow Danish flagged merchant vessels to use armed protection when transiting through areas where there is a high risk of piracy attacks. This means that in the Danish legal context, the use of armed guards is not limited to a specific area – such as the HRA – and PCASPs could therefore be used in other areas than those affected by Somali piracy. PCASPs were first allowed on board Danish-flagged ships in March 2011, after the government had turned down the shipping industry's requests for state military forces to be placed on board. However, numerous legal scholars have noted that Denmark has allowed a PCASP model with very little state control that relies on industry self-regulation, giving the industry the power to decide when their use of self-defence is justified. This liberal regulation is also different from how private security is dealt with domestically, where all guards are under state oversight. To be granted a one-year permit for the use of armed guards, Danish shippers must apply to the Ministry of Justice. As part of the application, shippers have to provide information about previous weapons licenses and the weapons lockers on board. They must also confirm that they are aware of the IMO guidelines on the use of armed guards and explain why they deem PCASP to be necessary. The permit is not specific to the voyage, meaning that a variety of different private security companies can be deployed within a year without the state overseeing the shipping company's decision. The law instead leaves the captain of the ship responsible for the armed guards.

While the International Maritime Organization (IMO) has issued guidelines for private security companies and guidelines for requirements when using them, the Danish law does not prescribe an obligation to follow these standards, even though the industry has promoted the use of these standards. Furthermore, there is a discrepancy in how private security companies can operate in the Gulf of Guinea and in the Indian Ocean. Vessels in the Gulf of Guinea are often attacked in territorial waters rather than on the high seas, meaning that the domestic laws of the 18 different coastal states in the Gulf of Guinea influence the degree to which security companies can be used.

== Private-public cooperation ==
In March 2021, the Danish Minister of Defense Trine Bramsen and the Minister of Foreign Affairs Jeppe Kofod held a press briefing, announcing the decision to deploy a frigate to patrol in the Gulf of Guinea from November 2021. Anne H. Steffensen, the CEO of the trade and employer organization Danish Shipping, stood next to the two ministers at the press briefing, commending the decision. Larsen and Nissen note that there has been a productive collaboration between the Danish shipping industry and Danish state authorities throughout the last decade of counter-piracy. Historically, there is an established line of communication between the two, which has benefited the policy aim of protecting merchant vessels.

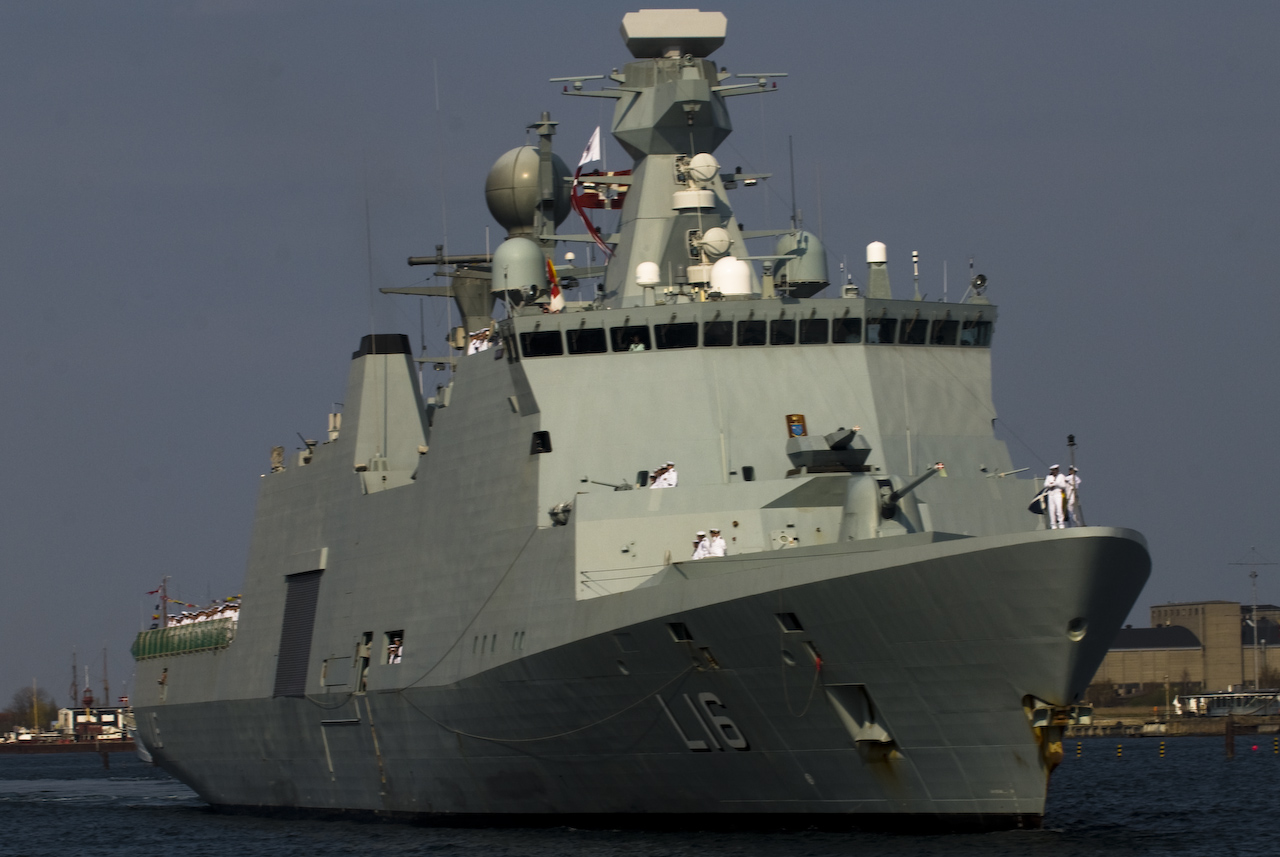
Denmark is deploying a frigate to the Gulf of Guinea from November 2021

Smed and Wivel argue that the importance of the shipping industry for the Danish economy renders piracy a strategic threat for Denmark. This means that Denmark has to find ways of convincing the international community that counter-piracy requires international involvement. They note that Denmark has been able to take an active role in the development of the Contact Group on Piracy off the Coast of Somalia (CGPCS) and in influencing operations due to its weak capabilities which makes Denmark appear unthreatening. Nevertheless, Denmark's administrative capacity makes it able to contribute to multilateral problem-solving such as by chairing the CGPCS Working Group 2 from its launch in 2009 until 2014. In a similar vein, Johannes Riber argues that the Danish Navy's deployment to the Indian Ocean from 2008 to 2015 can be understood as a strategic way through which a small state with limited naval resources could demand more international attention. Military scholar Katja Lindskov Jacobsen points to a similar political effect in the decision to the send a frigate to the Gulf of Guinea, as the decision signals that Denmark is committed to counter-piracy. The Danish decision has been welcomed by the international shipping industry. For instance, the German Shipowners’ Association (VDR) and the European Community Shipowners’ Association (ECSA) have expressed their support for Denmark's decision, urging other EU members to do the same.

== Prosecuting pirates under Danish Law ==
Complexities in the Danish legal system makes it difficult to prosecute pirates. Piracy in itself is not considered a criminal offense under Danish law. The Danish judicial system currently lacks the legal procedures and practices to prosecute suspected pirates. Presenting evidence as well as including proving intentions and affiliation with piracy groups can be challenging. In addition to that, efforts to extradite suspects are often futile due to the lack of international agreements between Denmark and African states.

Statements from the Danish Navy about past anti-piracy efforts off the coast of Somalia show that between 2008 and 2015, Denmark detained 295 suspected pirates. Out of these, 50 were prosecuted in Kenya and the Seychelles, while the remainder were released in a procedure known as "catch and release."

As of 2024, only one pirate has been successfully been prosecuted in Denmark. This case revolves around the pirate named Lucky Francis, who in 2023 was found guilty of endangering the lives of Danish soldiers after an exchange of fire broke out between the Danish frigate Esbern Snare and a small pirate group. The pirate named Lucky, who lost a leg in the event, despite being found guilty did not serve any of his sentence due to his health state.

== See also ==
- Anti-piracy measures in Somalia
- Piracy in the 21st century
- Piracy in the Gulf of Guinea
