= Christian Rabjerg Madsen =

Danish politician

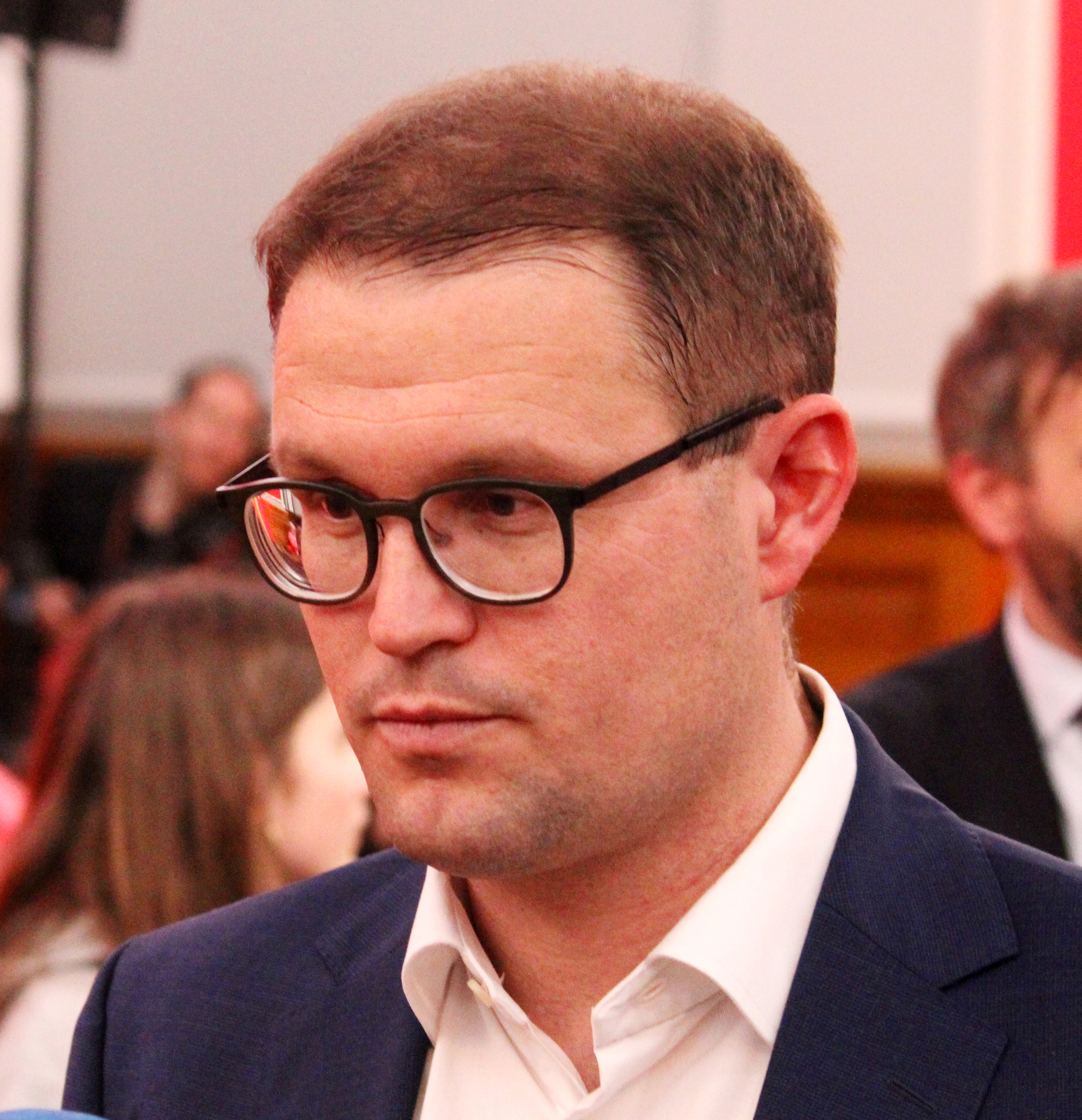
- Rabjerg Madsen in 2026

Minister of Nature and Animal Welfare
- Incumbent
- Assumed office 3 June 2026
- Prime Minister: Mette Frederiksen
- Preceded by: Jeppe Bruus

Minister of the Interior and Housing
- In office 2 May 2022 – 15 December 2022
- Prime Minister: Mette Frederiksen
- Preceded by: Kaare Dybvad
- Succeeded by: Sophie Løhde (Interior); Pernille Rosenkrantz-Theil (Housing)

Member of the Folketing
- Incumbent
- Assumed office 18 June 2015
- Constituency: South Jutland

Personal details
- Born: 14 March 1986 (age 40) Silkeborg, Denmark
- Party: Social Democrats
- Spouse: Anne Brink Pedersen (m. 2014)

Christian Rabjerg Madsen (born 24 March 1986) is a Danish politician, who has served as Minister of Nature and Animal Welfare since 2026. He previously served as Minister of the Interior and Housing. He has been a member of the Folketing for the Social Democrats political party since 2015.

== Political career ==
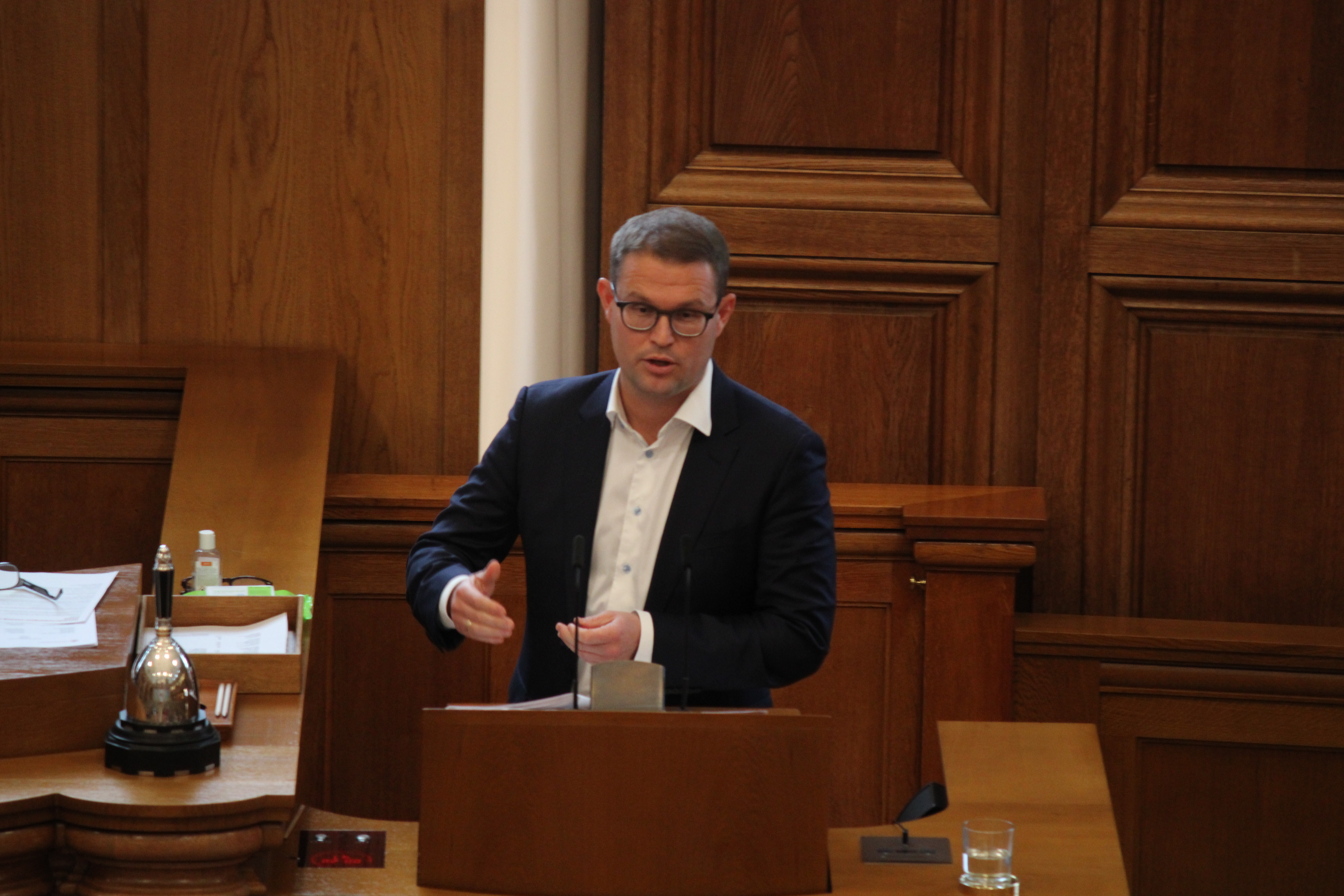
Rabjerg Madsen speaking in the Danish parliament, October 2025

Madsen proposal in October 2010 to implement a so-called student parliament at Aarhus University like had been done at other Danish universities.

In autumn 2013, Madsen's tour of the country with Ahmed Akkari debating on the topic of Islamism led to disturbances including stone-throwing.

Madsen was elected into parliament in the 2015 Danish general election, where he received 5,201 votes. He was re-elected in 2019 with 6,319 votes, and 7,844 votes in 2026

== Personal life ==
In June 2014, Madsen married Anne Brink Pedersen. They have two children together.
