= Ministry of Nature and Animal Welfare =

- Ministeriet for Natur og Dyrevelfærd

Ministry overview
- Formed: 29 August 2024
- Jurisdiction: Government of Denmark
- Headquarters: Copenhagen
- Ministry executives: Christian Rabjerg Madsen, Minister; Maria Schack Vindum, Head of Department
- Website: https://mgtp.dk/

The Ministry of Nature and Animal Welfare (Danish: Ministeriet for Natur og Dyrevelfærd) is a ministry of the Government of Denmark that was established on 29 August 2024. The minister of Nature and Animal Welfare is a member of the Cabinet of Denmark.

As part of a ministerial reshuffle in the Frederiksen II Cabinet, the ministry was presented in 2024 as the "Ministry of Green Tripartite". Jeppe Bruus was appointed as minister for Green Transition. When the Frederiksen III Cabinet was formed in 2026, it changed its name to the "Ministry of Nature and Animal Welfare", and Christian Rabjerg Madsen was appointed as the new minister.

== Green Tripartite ==
The Green Tripartite (Grønne trepart), made up of the Social Democrats, Venstre and Moderates) and the parties in the Green Tripartite (Landbrug & Fødevarer, the Danish Society for Nature Conservation, the Danish Food Union NNF, Dansk Metal, Confederation of Danish Industry and the Kommunernes Landsforening) on 24 June 2024. The agreement is to form the long-term basis for the conversion and restructuring of Denmark's land and of food and agricultural production in Denmark. The agreement includes the "Denmark's Green Land Fund", which is to be the basis for a land conversion with the removal of more than 15 percent of the total agricultural land in Denmark from agriculture to forest and nature. The agreement has allocated DKK 40 billion (as well as DKK 10 billion from the Novo Nordisk Foundation), which have the following responsibilities:

- Afforestation (250,000 hectares of forest by 2045)
- Removal of 140,000 hectares of carbon-rich lowland soils including marginal areas by 2030
- Initiation of strategic land acquisitions, including for the purpose of nitrogen reductions and land distribution.
- A controversial nitrogen intervention that could create the conditions for life to return to the oxygen-depleted Danish fjords.
- Research (1.5 billion DKK)

== Subordinate authorities ==
- Naturstyrelsen
- Styrelsen for Grøn Arealomlægning og Vandmiljø

== Agreement on agricultural nitrogen emissions ==
As an implementation of the green tripartite agreement, Minister Jeppe Bruus Christensen entered into an agreement on 3 December 2025 on the regulation of nitrogen emissions from agriculture, which was to reduce emissions by 9,600 tonnes of nitrogen. This corresponded to around two-thirds of the reductions that were assessed as necessary to restore life in the stressed Danish water areas. The reduction was to be achieved by imposing quotas on individual farms for how much they would emit. At the same time, farmers would receive compensation for the nitrogen regulation, which was to be phased out over time. The agreement was concluded between the three government parties as well as the SF, Liberal Alliance, Danish Social Liberal Party and Conservative People's Party.

== List of ministers ==
No.	Portrait	Name (born-died)	Term of office			Political party	Government	Ref.
No.	Portrait	Name (born-died)	Took office	Left office	Time in office	Political party	Government	Ref.
Minister of Green Tripartite (Minister for Grøn Trepart)
1		Jeppe Bruus Christensen (born 1978)	29 August 2024	3 June 2026	1 year, 278 days	Social Democrats	Frederiksen II	
Minister of Nature and Animal Welfare (Minister for natur og dyrevelfærd)
2		Christian Rabjerg Madsen (born 1986)	3 June 2026	Incumbent	70 days	Social Democrats	Frederiksen III	
