= Rasmus Stoklund =

Danish politician

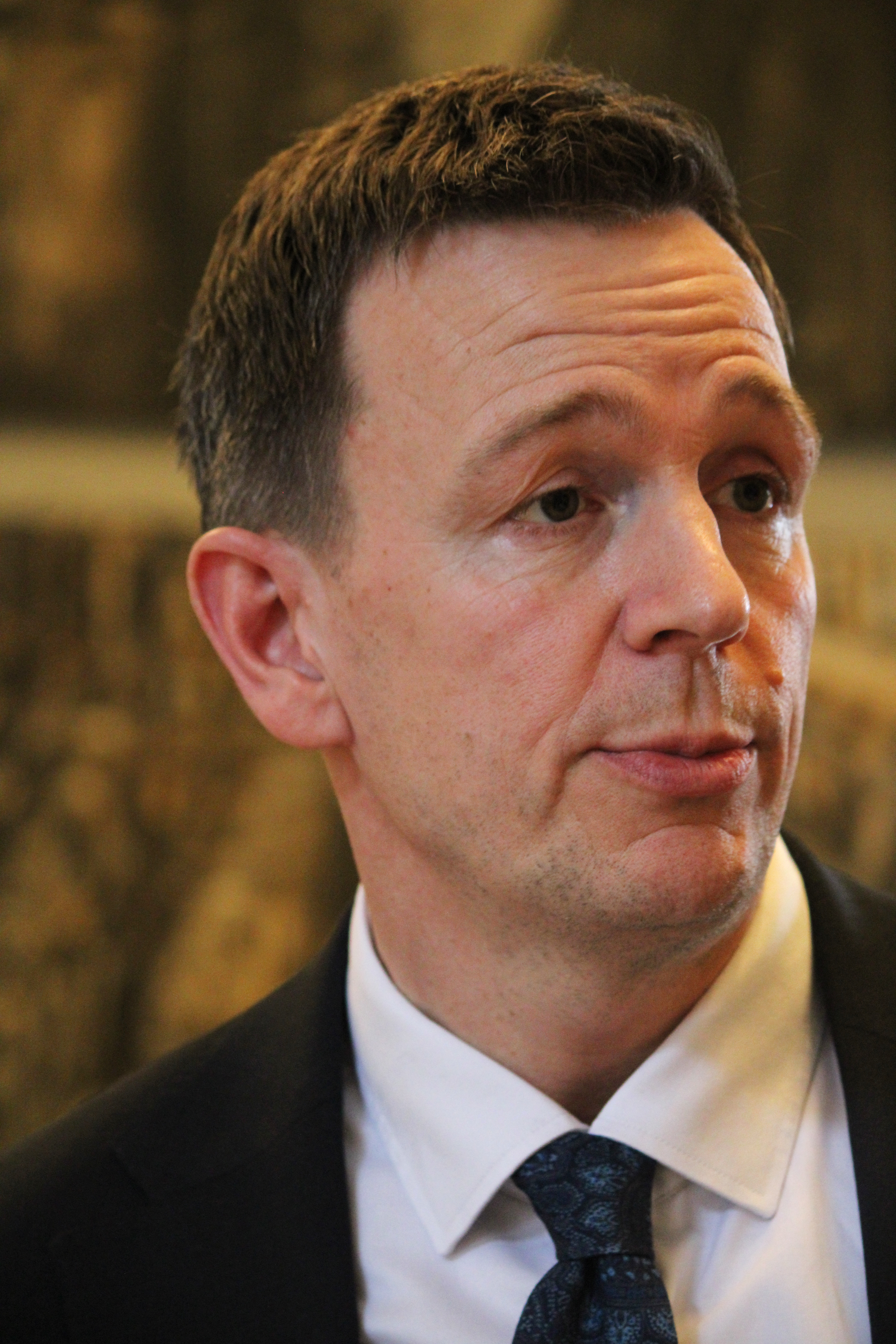
- Stoklund in 2026

Minister for Taxation
- In office 29 August 2024 – 23 September 2025
- Prime Minister: Mette Frederiksen
- Preceded by: Jeppe Bruus Christensen
- Succeeded by: Ane Halsboe-Jørgensen

Minister for Immigration and Integration
- In office 23 September 2025 – 3 June 2026
- Prime Minister: Mette Frederiksen
- Preceded by: Kaare Dybvad
- Succeeded by: Morten Bødskov

Member of the Folketing
- Incumbent
- Assumed office 5 June 2019
- Constituency: North Zealand

Personal details
- Born: 17 March 1984 (age 42) Fredericia, Denmark
- Party: Social Democrats

Rasmus Stoklund Holm-Nielsen (born 17 March 1984) is a Danish politician, who is a member of the Folketing for the Social Democrats political party. He was elected into parliament at the 2019 Danish general election.

== Political career ==
Born in Fredericia, Stoklund was elected into parliament in the 2019 election, where he received 4,541 votes.

In a 2024 book, Stoklund suggested Denmark should ignore judgements from the European Court of Human Rights when it comes to expelling criminal foreigners at risk of torture in their homeland. The government, led by Stoklund's party—the Social Democrats, rejected the proposal.

=== Minister for Taxation ===
Stoklund was appointed minister for taxation in a cabinet reshuffle on 29 August 2024.
