= Sofie Carsten Nielsen =

Danish politician (born 1975)

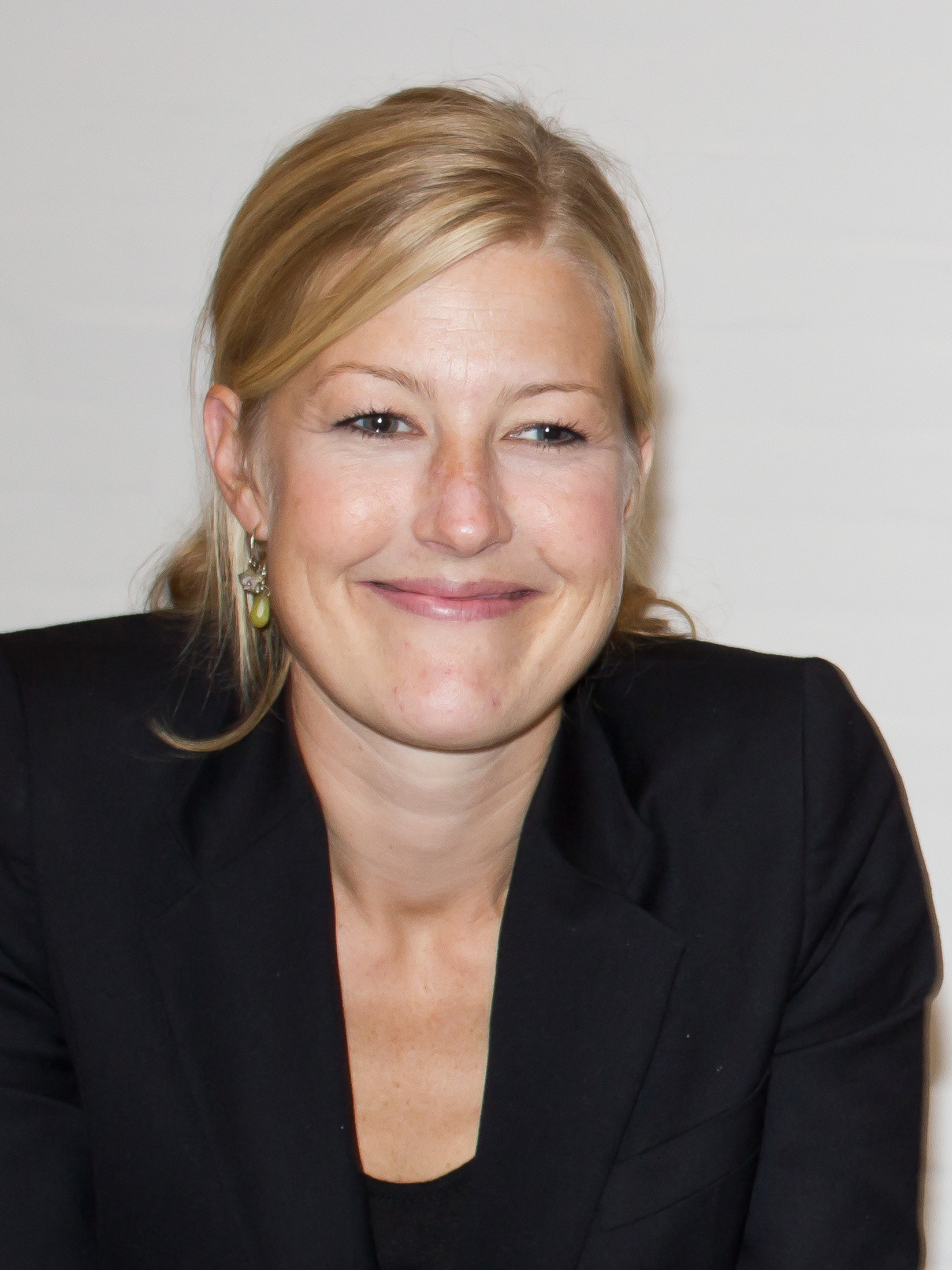
- Carsten Nielsen in 2011

Leader of the Social Liberal Party
- In office 7 October 2020 – 2 November 2022
- Preceded by: Morten Østergaard
- Succeeded by: Martin Lidegaard

Minister for Higher Education and Science
- In office 3 February 2014 – 28 June 2015
- Prime Minister: Helle Thorning-Schmidt
- Preceded by: Morten Østergaard
- Succeeded by: Esben Lunde Larsen

Member of the Folketing
- Incumbent
- Assumed office 15 September 2011
- Constituency: Greater Copenhagen

Personal details
- Born: 24 May 1975 (age 50) Hørsholm, Denmark
- Party: Social Liberals

Sofie Carsten Nielsen (born 24 May 1975) is a Danish politician, who was formerly the leader of the Danish Social Liberal Party from October 2020 to November 2022. In the 2000s, Nielsen began her political career with the European Parliament as a consultant before working for the Ministry of Gender Equality as a deputy minister. After being elected to the Folketing at the 2011 Danish general election for the Greater Copenhagen constituency, Nielsen became the Minister for Higher Education and Science in 2014. Nielsen remained in her minister position until she was replaced by Esben Lunde Larsen in 2015.

She left the Folketing on April 17. 2023 to become a lobbyist for DI.

== Political career ==
In an interview with Naturejobs, Nielsen mentioned that she originally did not plan to become involved in politics. She started her career at the European Parliament as a consultant from 2002 to 2004 before becoming a deputy minister of the Ministry of Gender Equality until 2009. After a brief position at the Danish Society of Engineers, Nielsen was elected to the Folketing for the Greater Copenhagen riding at the 2011 Danish general election. During her term, Nielsen was a spokesperson for several topics including gender equality and the European Union.

With the Danish Social Liberal Party, Nielsen became their vice-chairperson in 2011 before being promoted to chair in 2012. After holding her chair position for two years, Nielsen became the Minister for Higher Education and Science in 2014. As Minister for Higher Education and Science, Nielsen declared in 2014 that 4,000 student admissions to low turnover programs would be cut. Universities Denmark later negotiated a deal with her to have the number of cuts lowered and implemented starting in 2018. On 28 June 2015, Nielsen was replaced by Esben Lunde Larsen for the position of Minister for Higher Education and Science.

After her minister position ended, Nielsen returned to her position as the Danish Social Liberal Party's vice-chairperson in 2015. In October 2020, Nielsen was named Morten Østergaard's replacement as head of the Danish Social Liberal Party after Østergaard resigned from his leadership position.

As a result of the Commission of Inquiry into the Case of the Killing of Mink, she announced that, if Prime Minister Mette Frederiksen would not call a general election before 4 October 2022, her party would support a motion of no confidence against Frederiksen. Frederiksen went on to announce a snap election on 5 October, with Nielsen and her party supporting a second term for Frederiksen.

The Social Liberal Party went on to lose 9 out of 16 seats in the election. Receiving only a fourth of the votes she received in 2019, Nielsen took responsibility for the poor result and resigned as leader the day after on 2 November 2022. She was succeeded by Martin Lidegaard one day later.

== Personal life ==
Nielsen was born on 24 May 1975 in Hørsholm, Denmark. Nielsen earned a master's degree in politics and administration from the College of Europe in 2001 and a Master of Science from the University of Copenhagen in 2002. Nielsen is married with two children.

Political offices
Preceded by Morten Østergaard	Minister of Higher Education and Science; 2014–2015	Succeeded by Esben Lunde Larsen
Preceded by Morten Østergaard	Leader of the Social Liberal Party; 2020–	Succeeded by Incumbent
