= Minister for Taxation (Denmark) =

Danish cabinet member

Minister of Taxation
- Skatteminister
- State coat of arms of the Kingdom of Denmark

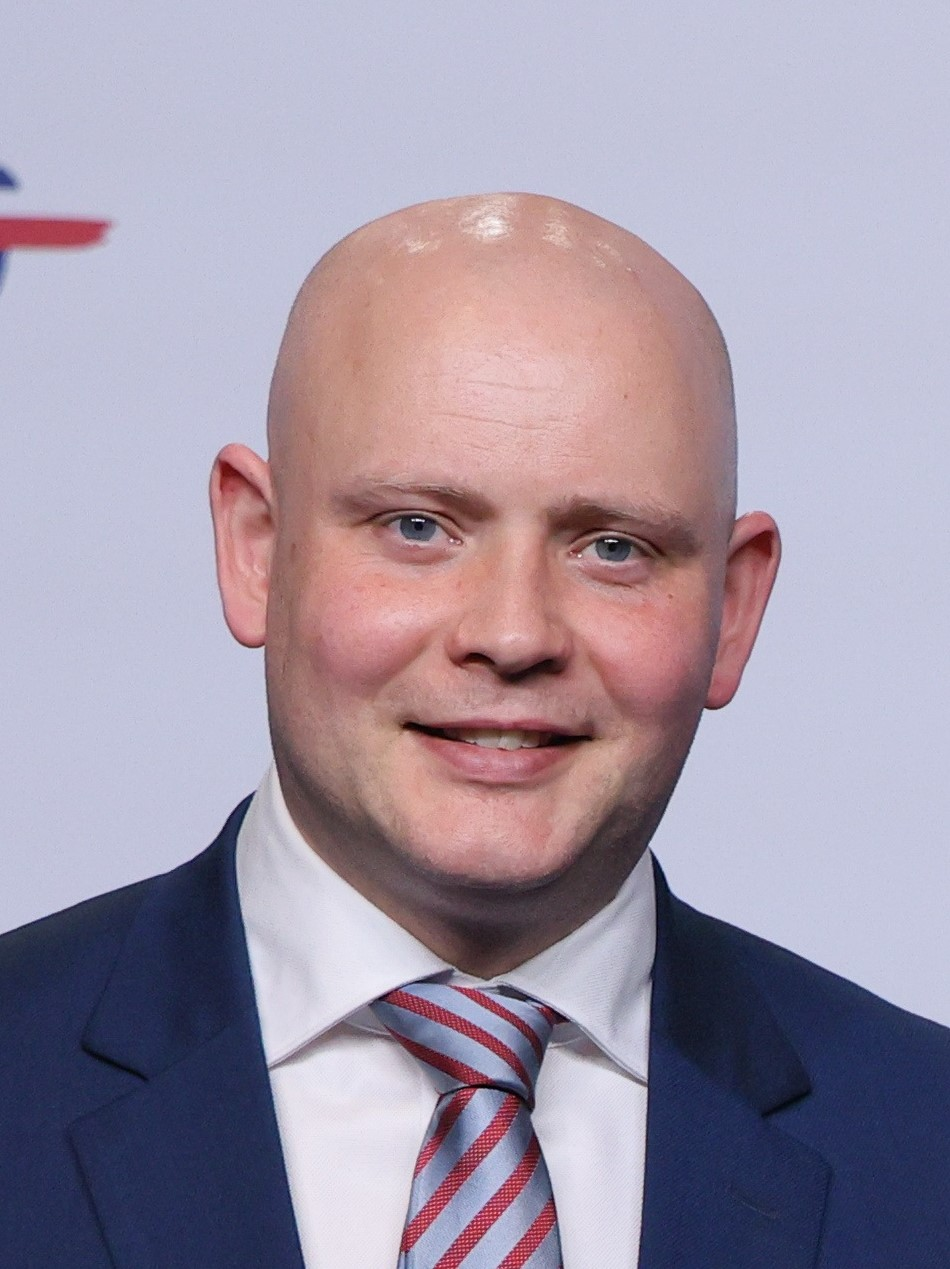
- Incumbent; Jakob Engel-Schmidt since 3 June 2026
- Ministry of Taxation
- Type: Minister
- Member of: Cabinet; State Council
- Reports to: the Prime minister
- Seat: Slotsholmen
- Appointer: The Monarch (on the advice of the Prime Minister)
- Formation: 13 February 1975
- First holder: Svend Jakobsen
- Succession: depending on the order in the State Council
- Deputy: Permanent Secretary
- Salary: 1.624.503,02 DKK (€217,931), in 2026
- Website: Official website

The Minister of Taxation (Danish: Skatteminister) is the head of the Ministry of Taxation and a member of the Cabinet. As the head of the Tax Ministry, the Danish tax minister is responsible for areas concerning taxes and tariffs, as well as labour market funds.

The collection of taxes was originally assumed by the Finance Ministry. The Finance Ministry's Department of Taxes and Customs (Skatte- og Tolddepartementet) was elevated to the rank of an independent ministry on 13 February 1975. It has officially been referred to as the Tax Ministry (Skatteministeriet) since 10 September 1987.

== List of ministers ==
No.	Portrait	Name (born–died)	Term of office			Political party	Government	Ref.
No.	Portrait	Name (born–died)	Took office	Left office	Time in office	Political party	Government	Ref.
Minister for Taxation and Duties (Minister for skatter og afgifter)
1		Svend Jakobsen (1935–2022)	13 February 1975	26 February 1977	2 years, 13 days	Social Democrats	Jørgensen II	
2		Jens Kampmann (1937–2026)	26 February 1977	30 August 1978	1 year, 185 days	Social Democrats	Jørgensen II	
3		Anders Ejnar Andersen (1912–2006)	30 August 1978	26 October 1979	1 year, 57 days	Venstre	Jørgensen III	
4		Karl Hjortnæs (born 1934)	26 October 1979	20 January 1981	1 year, 86 days	Social Democrats	Jørgensen IV	
5		Mogens Lykketoft (born 1946)	20 January 1981	10 September 1982	1 year, 233 days	Social Democrats	Jørgensen IV–V	
6		Isi Foighel (1927–2007)	10 September 1982	10 September 1987	5 years, 0 days	Conservatives	Schlüter I	
Minister for Taxation (Skatteminister)
7		Anders Fogh Rasmussen (born 1953)	10 September 1987	19 November 1992	5 years, 70 days	Venstre	Schlüter II–III–IV	
8		Peter Brixtofte (1949–2016)	19 November 1992	25 January 1993	67 days	Venstre	Schlüter IV	
9		Ole Stavad (born 1949)	25 January 1993	1 November 1994	1 year, 280 days	Social Democrats	P. N. Rasmussen I	
10		Carsten Koch (born 1945)	1 November 1994	23 March 1998	3 years, 142 days	Social Democrats	P. N. Rasmussen II–III	
9		Ole Stavad (born 1949)	23 March 1998	21 December 2000	2 years, 273 days	Social Democrats	P. N. Rasmussen IV	
11		Frode Sørensen (born 1946)	21 December 2000	27 November 2001	341 days	Social Democrats	P. N. Rasmussen IV	
12		Svend Erik Hovmand (born 1945)	27 November 2001	2 August 2004	2 years, 249 days	Venstre	A. F. Rasmussen I	
13		Kristian Jensen (born 1971)	2 August 2004	24 February 2010	5 years, 206 days	Venstre	A. F. Rasmussen I–II–III; L. L. Rasmussen I	
14		Troels Lund Poulsen (born 1974)	24 February 2010	8 March 2011	1 year, 12 days	Venstre	L. L. Rasmussen I	
15		Peter Christensen (1975–2025)	8 March 2011	3 October 2011	209 days	Venstre	L. L. Rasmussen I	
16		Thor Möger Pedersen (born 1985)	3 October 2011	16 October 2012	1 year, 222 days	Green Left	Thorning-Schmidt I	
17		Holger K. Nielsen (born 1950)	16 October 2012	12 December 2013	1 year, 57 days	Green Left	Thorning-Schmidt I	
18		Jonas Dahl (born 1978)	12 December 2013	30 January 2014	49 days	Green Left	Thorning-Schmidt I	
19		Morten Østergaard (born 1976)	3 February 2014	2 September 2014	215 days	Social Liberals	Thorning-Schmidt II	
20		Benny Engelbrecht (born 1970)	2 September 2014	28 June 2015	299 days	Social Democrats	Thorning-Schmidt II	
21		Karsten Lauritzen (born 1983)	28 June 2015	27 June 2019	3 years, 364 days	Venstre	L. L. Rasmussen II–III	
22		Morten Bødskov (born 1970)	27 June 2019	4 February 2022	2 years, 222 days	Social Democrats	Frederiksen I	
23		Jeppe Bruus (born 1978)	4 February 2022	29 August 2024	2 years, 207 days	Social Democrats	Frederiksen I–II	
24		Rasmus Stoklund (born 1984)	29 August 2024	23 September 2025	1 year, 25 days	Social Democrats	Frederiksen II	
25		Ane Halsboe-Jørgensen (born 1983)	23 September 2025	3 June 2026	253 days	Social Democrats	Frederiksen II	
Minister of Taxation and Growth (Skatte- og vækstminister)
26		Jakob Engel-Schmidt (born 1977)	3 June 2026	Incumbent	96 days	Moderates	Frederiksen III	
