= Karsten Lauritzen =

Danish politician

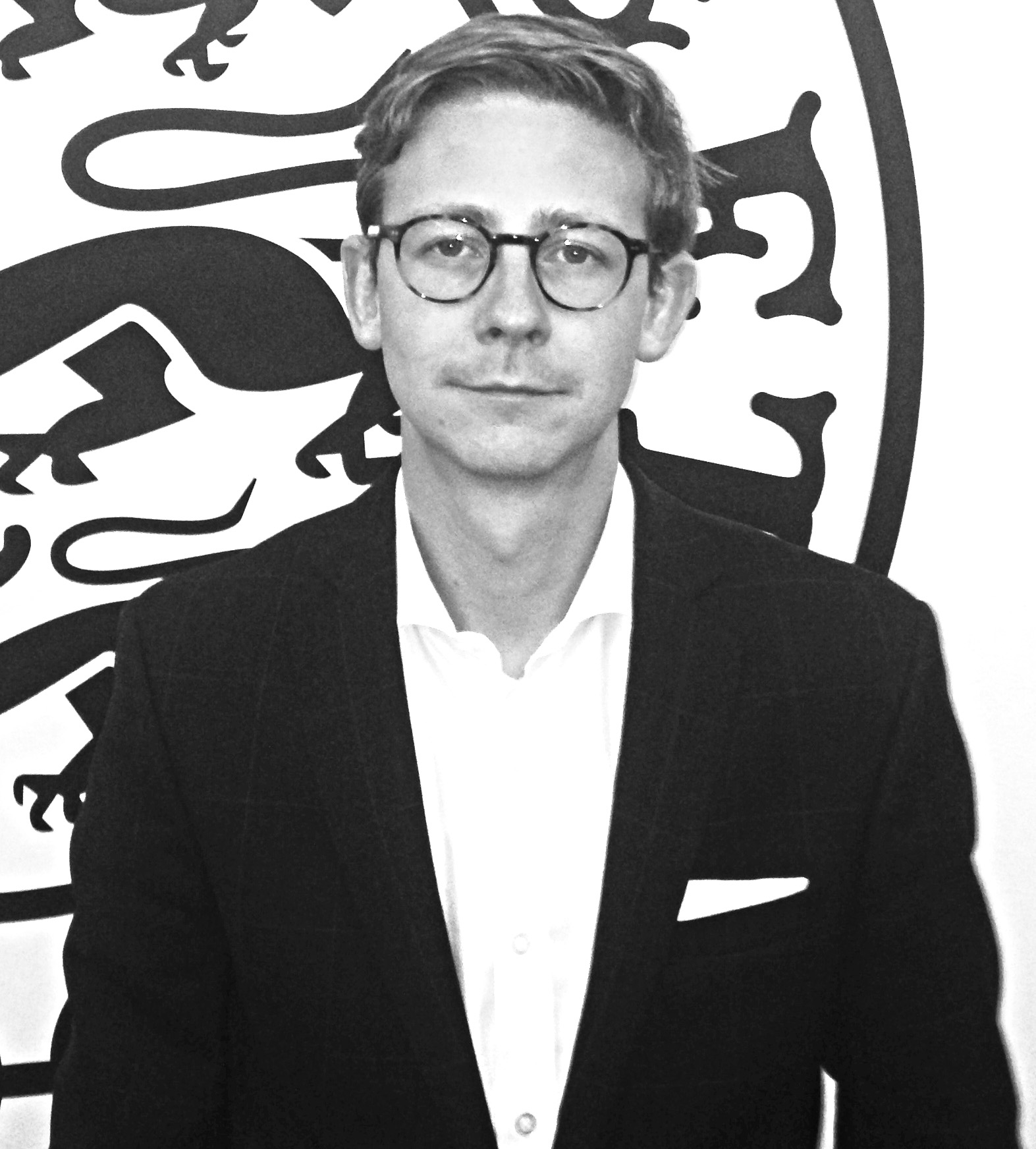

Minister for Taxation
- In office 28 June 2015 – 27 June 2019
- Prime Minister: Lars Løkke Rasmussen
- Preceded by: Benny Engelbrecht
- Succeeded by: Morten Bødskov

Member of the Folketing
- Incumbent
- Assumed office 13 November 2007
- Constituency: North Jutland

Personal details
- Born: Karsten Styrbæk Lauritzen; 14 October 1983 (age 42) Løgstør, Denmark
- Party: Venstre

Karsten Styrbæk Lauritzen (born 14 October 1983 in Løgstør) is a former Danish politician, who was a member of the Folketing for the Venstre political party. He was first elected into parliament in the 2007 Danish general election and left the parliament on the 31 January 2022. He served as Minister of Taxation from 2015 to 2019.

== Background ==
Lauritzen was born and raised in Løgstør. His father Jens Lauritzen is a farmer and former mayor of Løgstør Municipality and Vesthimmerland Municipality. Karsten Lauritzen got his high school exam from Fjerritslev Gymnasium and has a bachelor's degree in public administration from Aalborg University.

== Political career ==
Karsten Lauritzen began his political career as a member of Venstres Ungdom the official youth party for the Liberal Party of Denmark. He later became deputy chairman for Venstres Ungdom from 2003 to 2005 and then chairman from 2005 to 2007. He was elected into the Folketing in the 2007 general election. In the parliament he previously served as both integration and development spokesman as well as legal spokesman for the Venstre party. He was appointed Tax Minister on 28 June 2015, as part of Lars Løkke Rasmussen II Cabinet. He continued in the same position in the Lars Løkke Rasmussen III Cabinet. He resigned in 2019 due to the stress of the Danish Dividend Scandal.

Political offices
Preceded by Benny Engelbrecht	Minister for Taxation; 2015–2019	Succeeded by Morten Bødskov
