= Morten Bødskov =

Danish politician

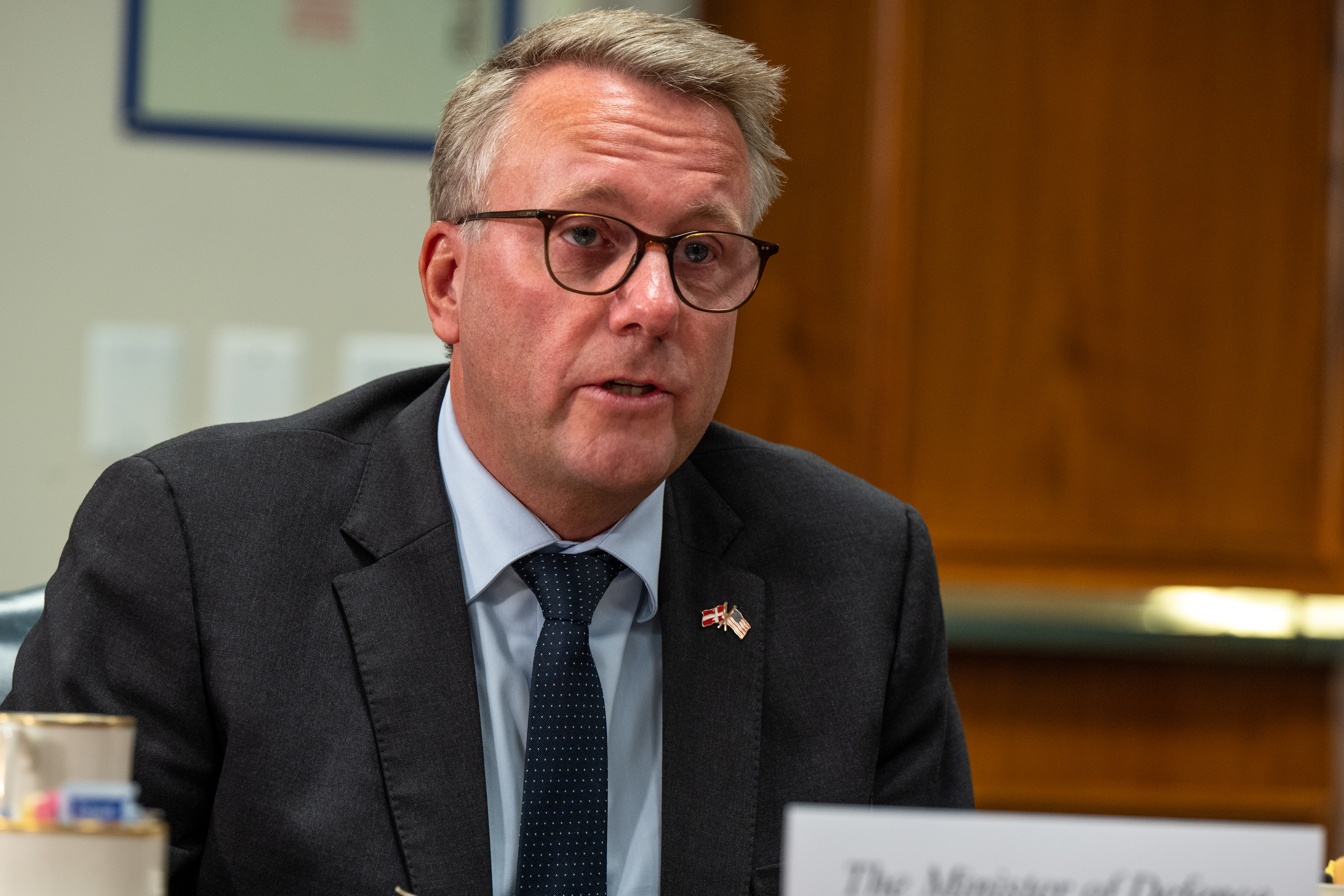
- Bødskov in 2022

Minister for Immigration and Integration
- Incumbent
- Assumed office 3 June 2026
- Prime Minister: Mette Frederiksen
- Preceded by: Rasmus Stoklund

Minister for Business
- In office 15 December 2022 – 3 June 2026
- Prime Minister: Mette Frederiksen
- Preceded by: Simon Kollerup
- Succeeded by: Martin Lidegaard

Minister of Defence
- In office 4 February 2022 – 15 December 2022
- Prime Minister: Mette Frederiksen
- Preceded by: Trine Bramsen
- Succeeded by: Jakob Ellemann-Jensen

Minister of Taxation
- In office 27 June 2019 – 4 February 2022
- Prime Minister: Mette Frederiksen
- Preceded by: Karsten Lauritzen
- Succeeded by: Jeppe Bruus

Minister of Justice
- In office 3 October 2011 – 11 December 2013
- Prime Minister: Helle Thorning-Schmidt
- Preceded by: Lars Barfoed
- Succeeded by: Karen Hækkerup

Member of the Folketing
- Incumbent
- Assumed office 20 November 2001
- Constituency: Greater Copenhagen (2007-); Copenhagen (2001-2007)

Personal details
- Born: 1 May 1970 (age 56) Karup, Denmark
- Party: Social Democrats
- Spouse: Anna Elisabeth Bødskov (m. 2005)

Morten Bødskov (born 1 May 1970) is a Danish Social Democratic politician, member of the Folketing, and the Minister for Integration since 2026. He was Minister for Business from 2022 to 2026, Minister of Defence from February to December 2022, and Minister for Taxation under Frederiksen and Minister of Justice in the Government of Helle Thorning-Schmidt.

== Political career ==
=== Early beginnings ===
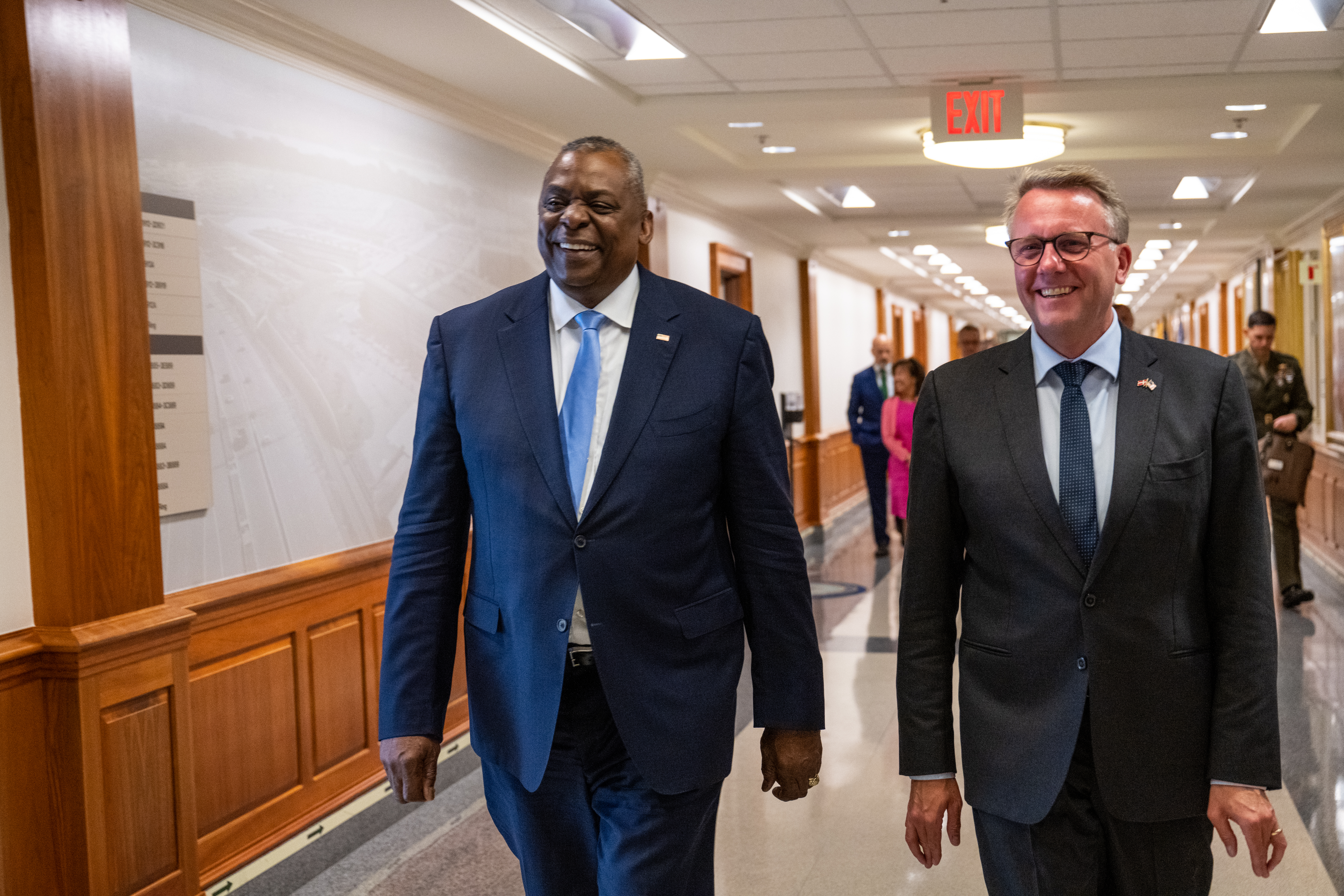
Bødskov with U.S. Secretary of Defense Lloyd Austin on 1 September 2022

At age 15 Bødskov joined the Social Democratic Youth of Denmark (DSU), where he quickly assumed numerous positions of trust. In 1996, he took over as federal president of the DSU from Henrik Sass Larsen. In 2001, he was elected to the Folketing and in 2005 Helle Thorning-Schmidt appointed him as deputy chairman of the parliamentary group.

=== Career in government ===
From 3 October 2011 to 11 December 2013, Bødskov served as Minister of Justice. As Minister of Justice, Bødskov was among those who spearheaded austerity measures, new restrictions on air guns, a new Probation system and the creation of 200 new prison spots, an increased focus on gang and biker-related crime, and the highly controversial amendment to the Public Records Act.

On 27 June 2019, Bødskov became the Minister of Taxation in the Frederiksen Cabinet. In a February 2022 cabinet reshuffle, he was transferred to the role of Minister of Defence.

== Other activities ==
- European Bank for Reconstruction and Development (EBRD), Ex-Officio Member of the Board of Governors (since 2022)
- European Investment Bank (EIB), Ex-Officio Member of the Board of Governors (since 2022)
- Nordic Investment Bank (NIB), Ex-Officio Member of the Board of Governors (since 2022)

== Personal life ==
Bødskov has been married to Anna Elisabeth Bødskov since 2005.

Political offices
Preceded by Lars Barfoed	Minister of Justice; 2011–2013	Succeeded by Karen Hækkerup
Preceded by Karsten Lauritzen	Minister for Taxation; 2019–2022	Succeeded by Jeppe Bruus Christensen
Preceded by Trine Bramsen	Minister of Defence; 2022–	Succeeded by Incumbent
