= Morten Østergaard =

Danish politician

Morten Østergaard MP
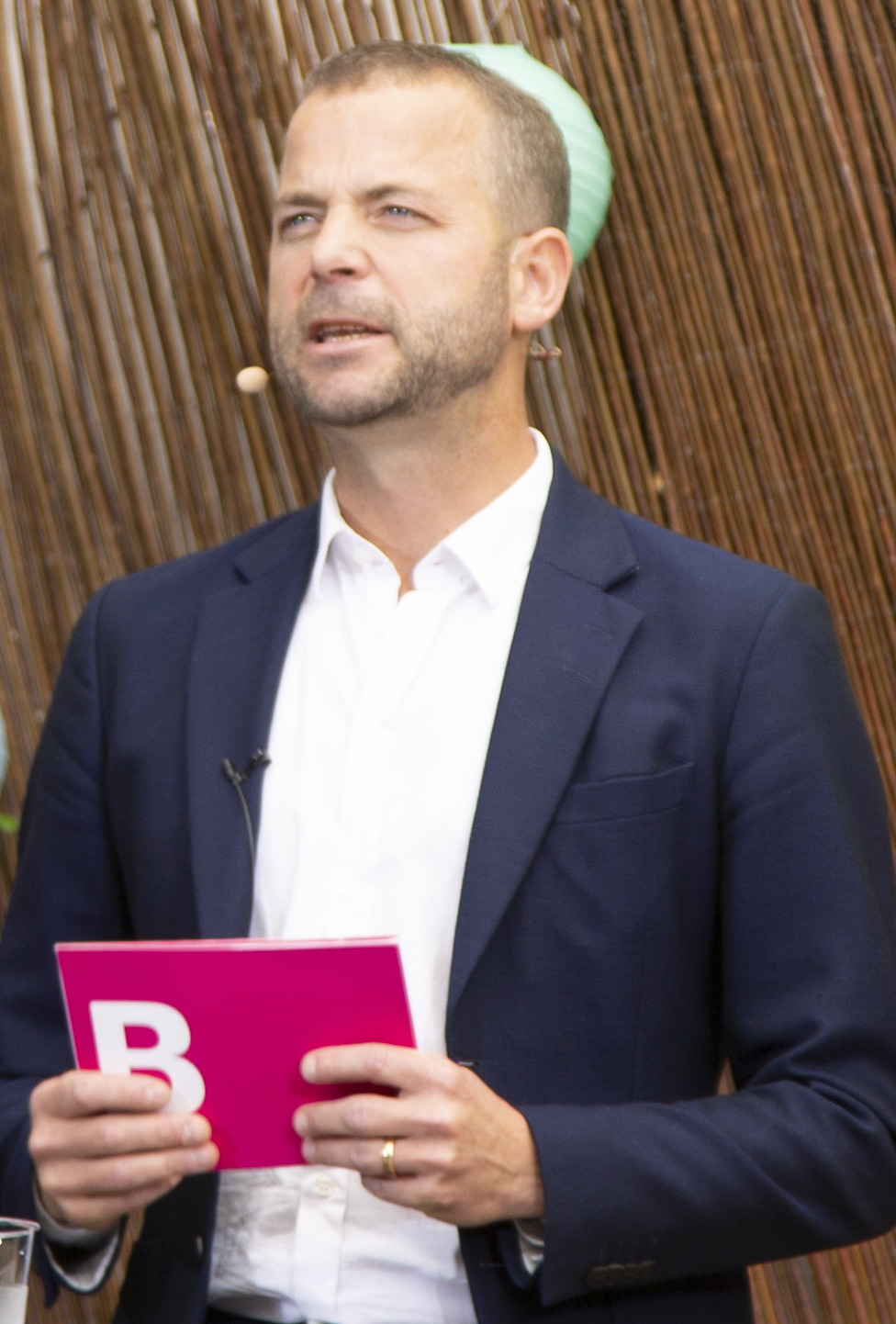

Leader of the Social Liberal Party
- In office 2 September 2014 – 7 October 2020
- Preceded by: Margrethe Vestager
- Succeeded by: Sofie Carsten Nielsen

Deputy Prime Minister of Denmark
- In office 2 September 2014 – 28 June 2015
- Prime Minister: Helle Thorning-Schmidt
- Preceded by: Margrethe Vestager
- Succeeded by: Claus Hjort Frederiksen

Minister for Economy and Interior
- In office 2 September 2014 – 28 June 2015
- Prime Minister: Helle Thorning-Schmidt
- Preceded by: Margrethe Vestager
- Succeeded by: Simon Emil Ammitzbøll-Bille

Minister for Taxation
- In office 3 February 2014 – 2 September 2014
- Prime Minister: Helle Thorning-Schmidt
- Preceded by: Jonas Dahl
- Succeeded by: Benny Engelbrecht

Minister for Higher Education and Science
- In office 3 October 2011 – 3 February 2014
- Prime Minister: Helle Thorning-Schmidt
- Preceded by: Charlotte Sahl-Madsen
- Succeeded by: Sofie Carsten Nielsen

Member of the Folketing
- In office 8 February 2005 – 16 June 2021
- Constituency: East Jutland (2007—2021); Århus (2005—2007)

Personal details
- Born: 17 June 1976 (age 50) Aarhus, Denmark
- Party: Social Liberal Party
- Spouse: Line Legarth Sigel
- Education: University of Aarhus

Morten Østergaard (born 17 June 1976) is a former Danish politician who served as Denmark's Minister for Economic and Interior Affairs from 2 September 2014 to 28 June 2015. Leader of the Danish Social Liberal Party from September 2014 to October 2020, he was a member of the Folketing from 2005 to 2021. He was furthermore Minister for Research, Innovation and Higher Education from 2011 to 2014 and for a short term in 2014 also Minister for Taxation.

== Background ==
He holds a master's degree in political science from the University of Aarhus.

== Political career ==
Østergaard was vice-chairman of the party from 2002 to 2005 and has been a member of parliament since the 2005 election.

Following the announcement on 31 August 2014 that Margrethe Vestager is to become Denmark's EU Commissioner, Østergaard was elected leader of the Danish Social Liberal Party and was appointed Deputy Prime Minister of Denmark, as well as Minister of the Interior. On 7 October 2020 Østergaard resigned as the leader of the Danish Social Liberal Party due to inappropriate sexual behaviour towards fellow Social Liberal MP Lotte Rod.

Political offices
Preceded by Margrethe Vestager	Leader of the Social Liberal Party; 2014—2020	Succeeded by Sofie Carsten Nielsen
Preceded by Margrethe Vestager	Minister for Economic Affairs; 2014–2015	Succeeded by Simon Emil Ammitzbøll-Bille
Preceded by Margrethe Vestager	Minister of the Interior; 2014–2015	Succeeded by Karen Ellemann
Preceded by Jonas Dahl	Minister for Taxation; 2014–2014	Succeeded by Benny Engelbrecht
Preceded by Charlotte Sahl-Madsen	Minister of Higher Education and Science; 2011–2014	Succeeded by Sofie Carsten Nielsen
