= Benny Engelbrecht =

Danish politician

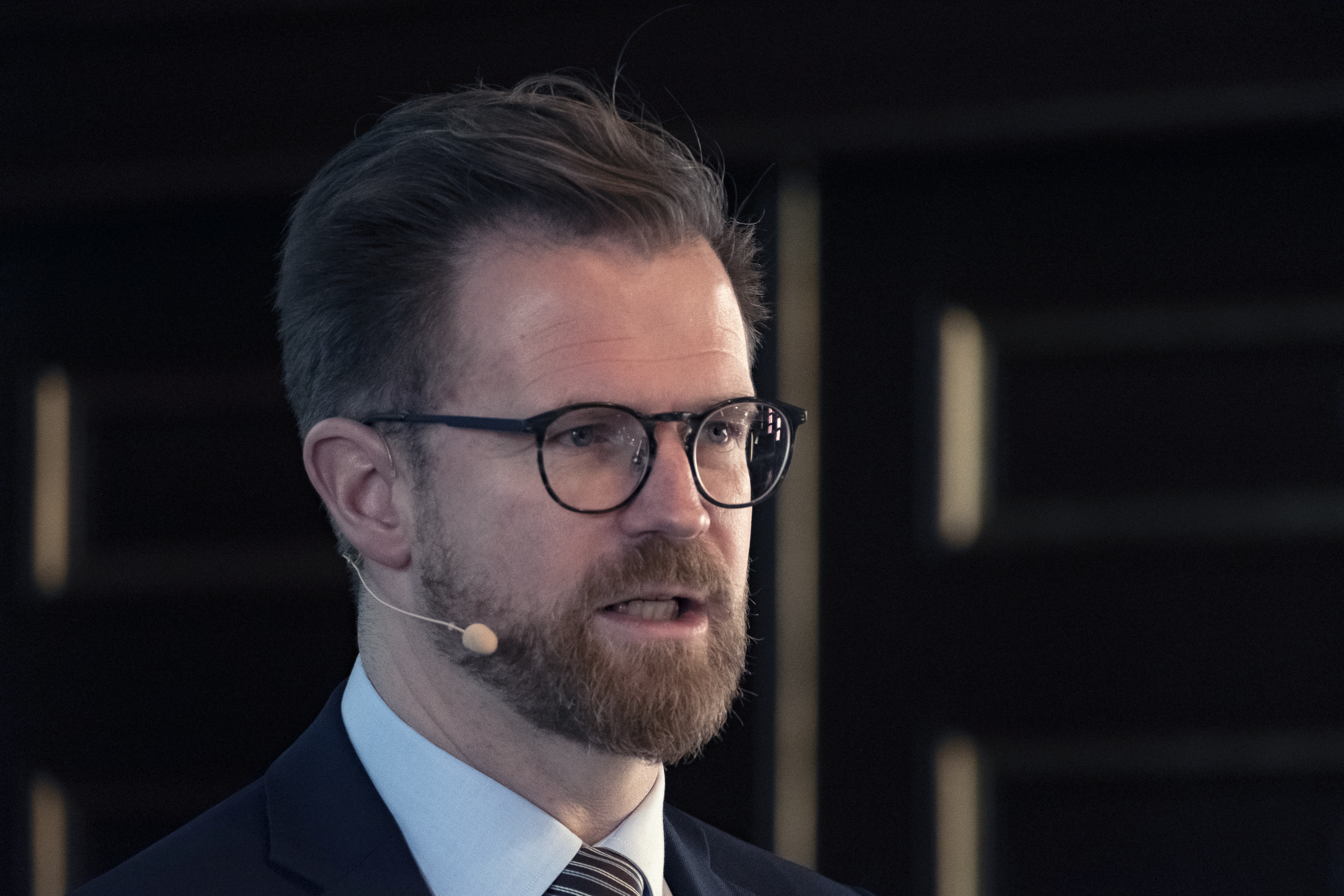

Minister of Transport
- In office 27 June 2019 – 4 February 2022
- Prime Minister: Mette Frederiksen
- Preceded by: Ole Birk Olesen (as Minister for Transport, Building, and Housing)
- Succeeded by: Trine Bramsen

Minister of Taxation
- In office 2 September 2014 – 28 June 2015
- Prime Minister: Helle Thorning-Schmidt
- Preceded by: Morten Østergaard
- Succeeded by: Karsten Lauritzen

Member of the Folketing
- Incumbent
- Assumed office 13 November 2007
- Constituency: South Jutland

Personal details
- Born: 4 August 1970 (age 55) Amager, Denmark
- Party: Social Democrats

Benny Engelbrecht (born 4 August 1970) is a Danish politician who has been a member of the Folketing for the Social Democrats since the 2007 general elections. He served as the Minister of Transport from 2019 to 2022. He previously served as Minister of Taxation from 2014 to 2015.

Engelbrecht was born on Amager to Alf Sørensen and Ulla Sørensen, and is married to Charlotte Engelbrecht.

== Political career ==
Engelbrecht was first elected into the Folketing for the Social Democrats in 2007. He was reelected in the 2011 election, after which election the Social Democrats entered a coalition government with the Socialist People's Party and Social Liberal Party, with the Socialist People's Party later leaving government. When Morten Østergaard, Minister of Taxation in the Thorning-Schmidt II Cabinet, left the office to become Minister of Interior and Economy, Engelbrecht was appointed to take over as Minister of Taxation.

Engelbrecht was reelected in 2015 and 2019. He was appointed Minister for Transport in the Frederiksen Cabinet from 27 June 2019.

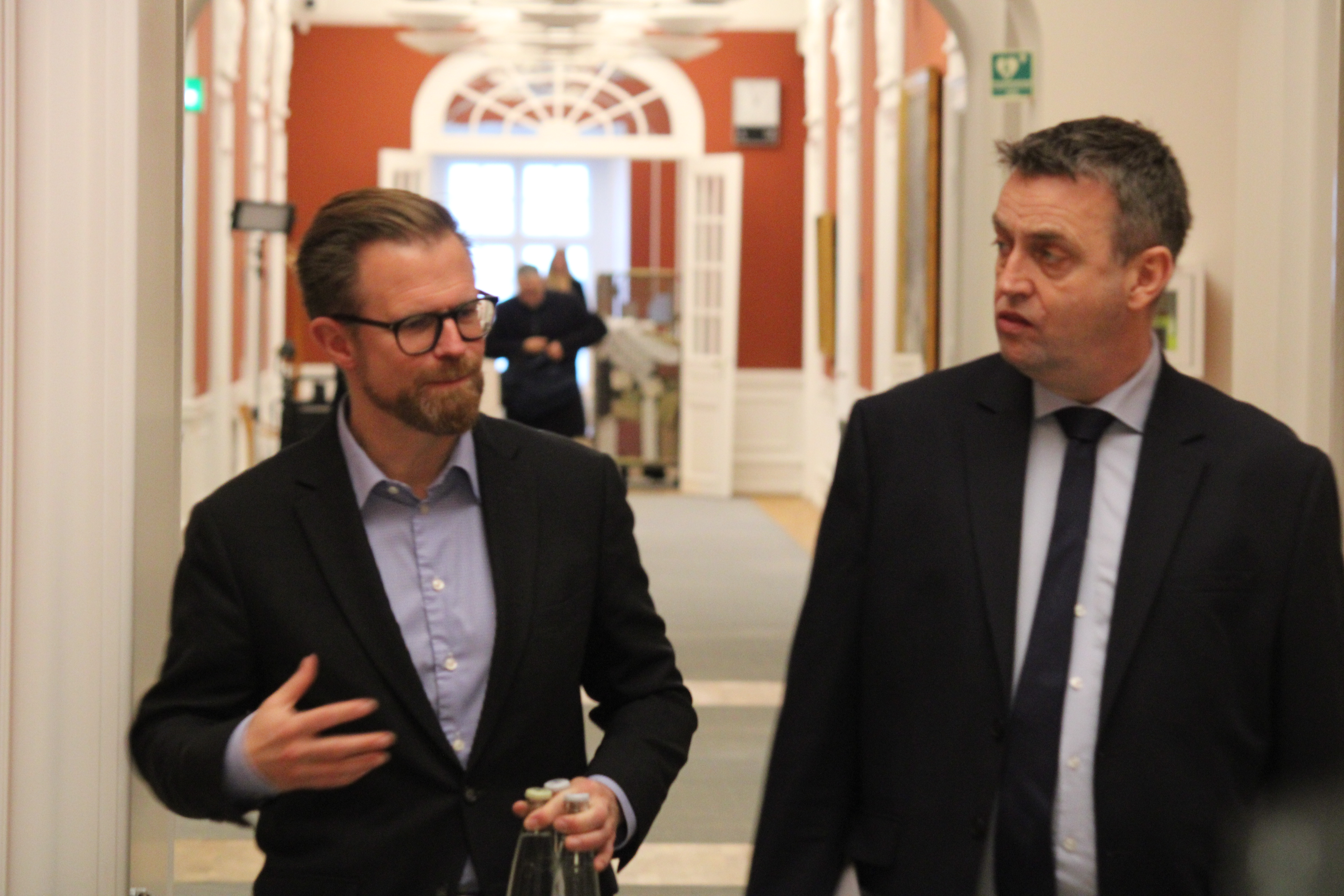
Engelbrecht with Leif Lahn Jensen at Christiansborg, December 2025

He resigned in February 2022, after failing to disclose information to the Folketing regarding a major infrastructure bill that was passed in July 2021. This led Mette Frederiksen to conduct a cabinet reshuffle in the wake of his resignation on 4 February.

== Bibliography ==
- De politiske håndværkere – om magt, indflydelse og resultater på Christiansborg (2017, co-author)
- Rød bonde – et portræt af Erik Lauritzen (2013)
- Foodfight.eu – din kost bestemmer, hvem du er. Men hvem bestemmer, hvad du spiser? (2011, co-author)

Political offices
Preceded by Morten Østergaard	Minister of Taxation; 2014–2015	Succeeded by Karsten Lauritzen
Preceded by Ole Birk Olesen	Minister of Transport; 2019–2022	Succeeded by Trine Bramsen
