= Ole Birk Olesen =

Danish politician (born 1972)

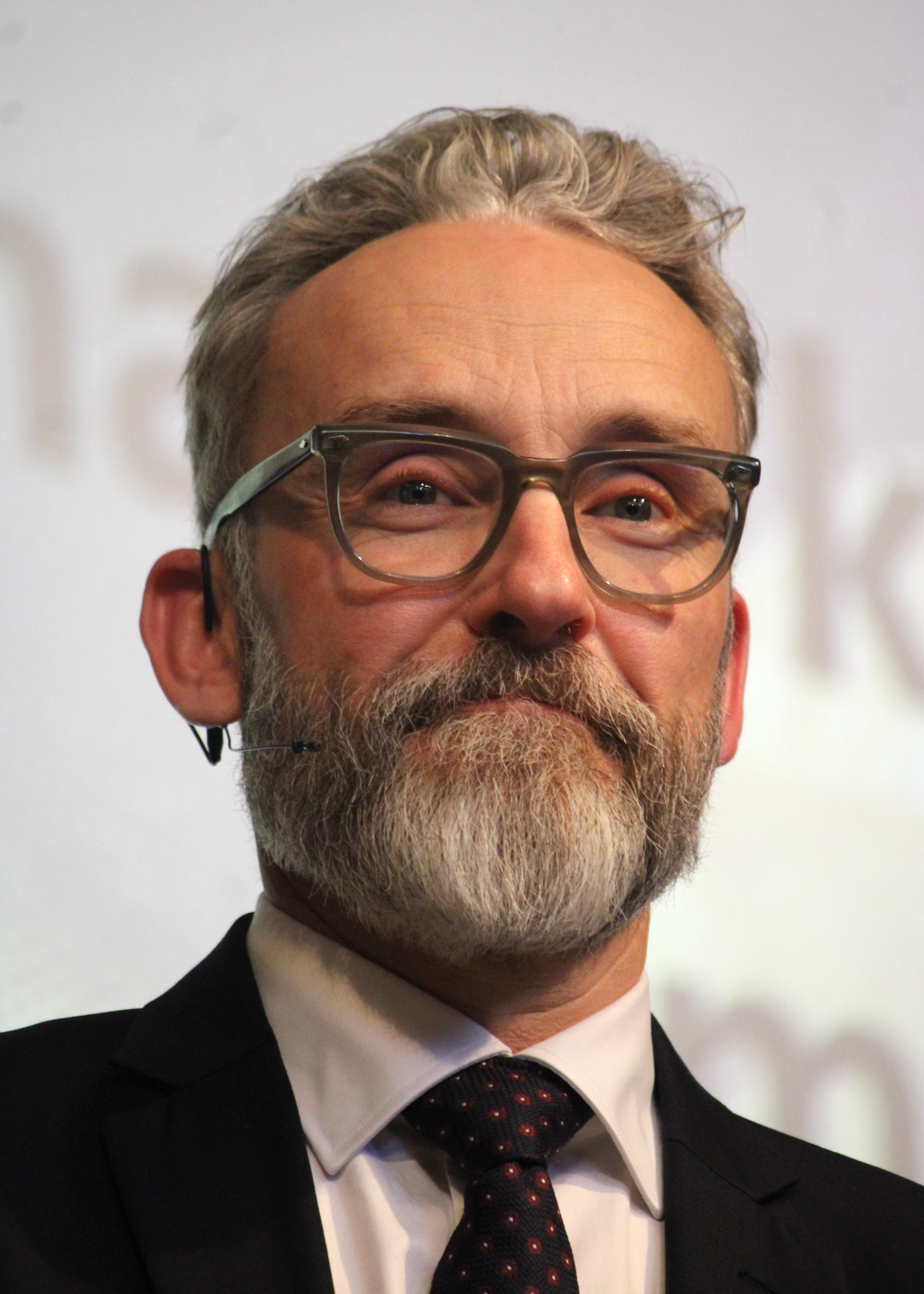
- Olesen in 2026

Minister of Transport, Building and Housing
- In office 28 November 2016 – 27 June 2019

Member of the Folketing
- Incumbent
- Assumed office 15 September 2011
- Constituency: East Jutland

Personal details
- Born: 21 December 1972 (age 53) Gram, Denmark
- Party: Liberal Alliance

Ole Birk Olesen (born 21 December 1972) is a Danish politician, who is a member of the Folketing for the Liberal Alliance political party. He was elected into parliament at the 2011 Danish general election. From 2016 to 2019 he served as Denmark's Minister of Transport, Building and Housing.

== Political career ==
Olesen was elected into parliament at the 2011 election, where he received 3,758 personal votes in East Jutland. He was reelected in 2015 with 5,941 votes, and on 28 November 2016 he was appointed Minister of Transport, Building and Housing in the Lars Løkke Rasmussen III Cabinet.

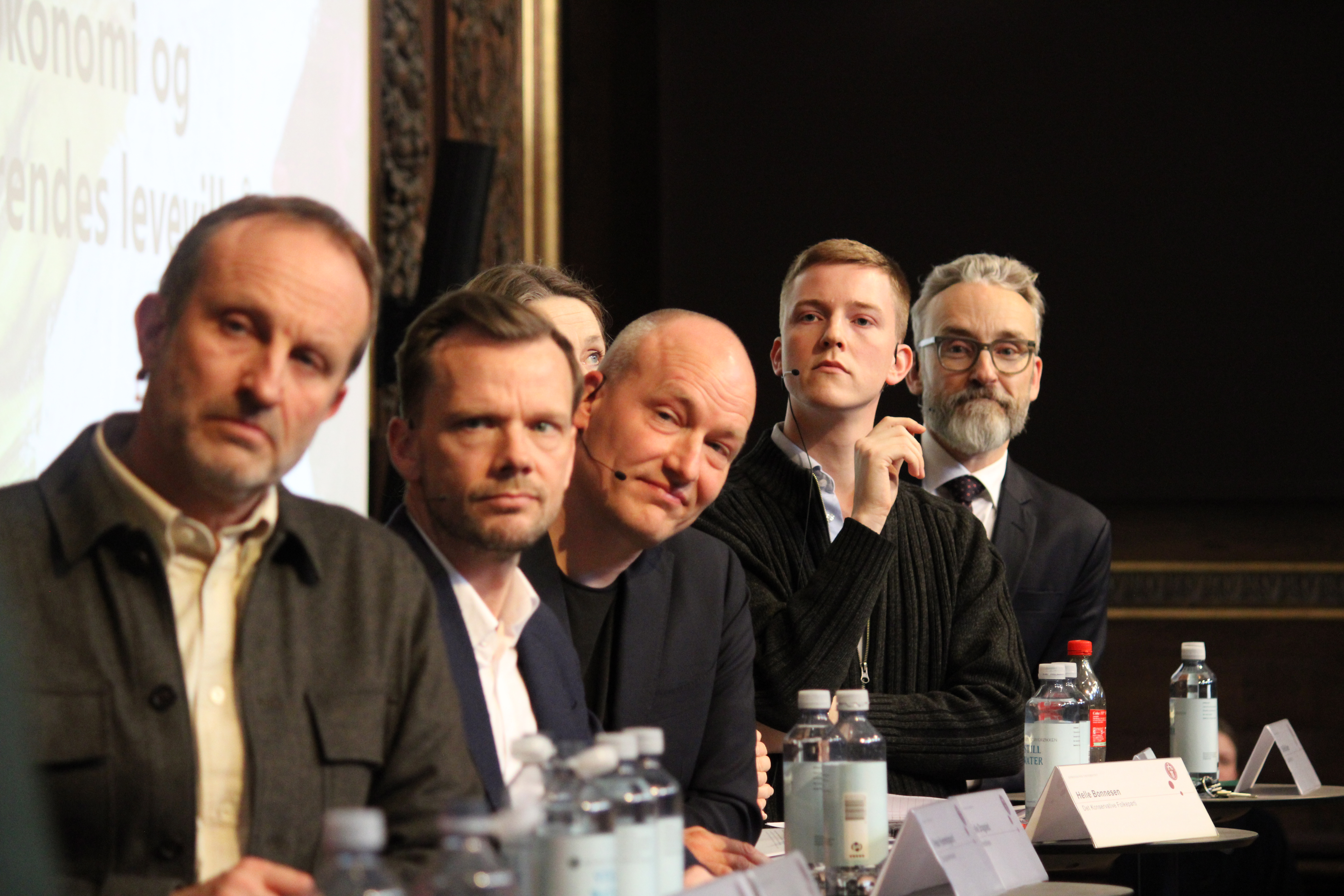
Olesen during a debate at the University of Copenhagen, 2026

In 2019 he was reelected with 2,020 votes, but as the red bloc got a majority in Parliament, he was not able to continue as a minister. After the 2019 election Olesen became the parliamentary group leader of Liberal Alliance, while newly elected Alex Vanopslagh became the party chairman. He was reelected in 2022 with 5,488 personal votes.

Political offices
Preceded by Hans Christian Schmidt	Minister of Transport; 2016–2019	Succeeded by Benny Engelbrecht
Preceded by Inger Støjberg	Minister for Building and Housing; 2016–2019	Succeeded by Kaare Dybvad
