= HDMS Esbern Snare =

Two ships of the Royal Danish Navy have been named HDMS Esbern Snare, named after Esbern Snare, brother of Absalon:

- The first HDMS Esbern Snare (F341), was a Hunt-class destroyer purchased from the Royal Navy in 1952.
- The second and current HDMS Esbern Snare (F342), commissioned in 2007, is an Absalon-class support ship.
