= Lucky Francis =

Nigerian-Danish pirate (born 1982)

Lucky Francis (born 1982), also known as Lucky the Pirate (Danish: Piraten Lucky), is a Nigerian national who became known in Denmark after an armed confrontation with the Danish frigate HDMS Esbern Snare in the Gulf of Guinea in 2021. During the incident, he was seriously injured, had one leg amputated, and was subsequently transported to Denmark, where he was prosecuted. The case received considerable political and public attention, particularly due to the decision not to deport him after the verdict.

== Background ==
Danish shipping's counter-piracy strategy is necessary as Denmark operates one of the world's five largest shipping nations in terms of operated fleet, controlling around 10% of global shipping. At any given time, there are approximately 70 Danish-controlled ships in the Indian Ocean and 30 ships in the Gulf of Guinea. This makes piracy in these areas a significant concern for the Danish shipping industry and for the Danish state. In 2012, when Somali piracy was at its height, the piracy cost of Danish shipping was estimated to be between 130 and 260 million Euros.

== Esbern Snare incident ==
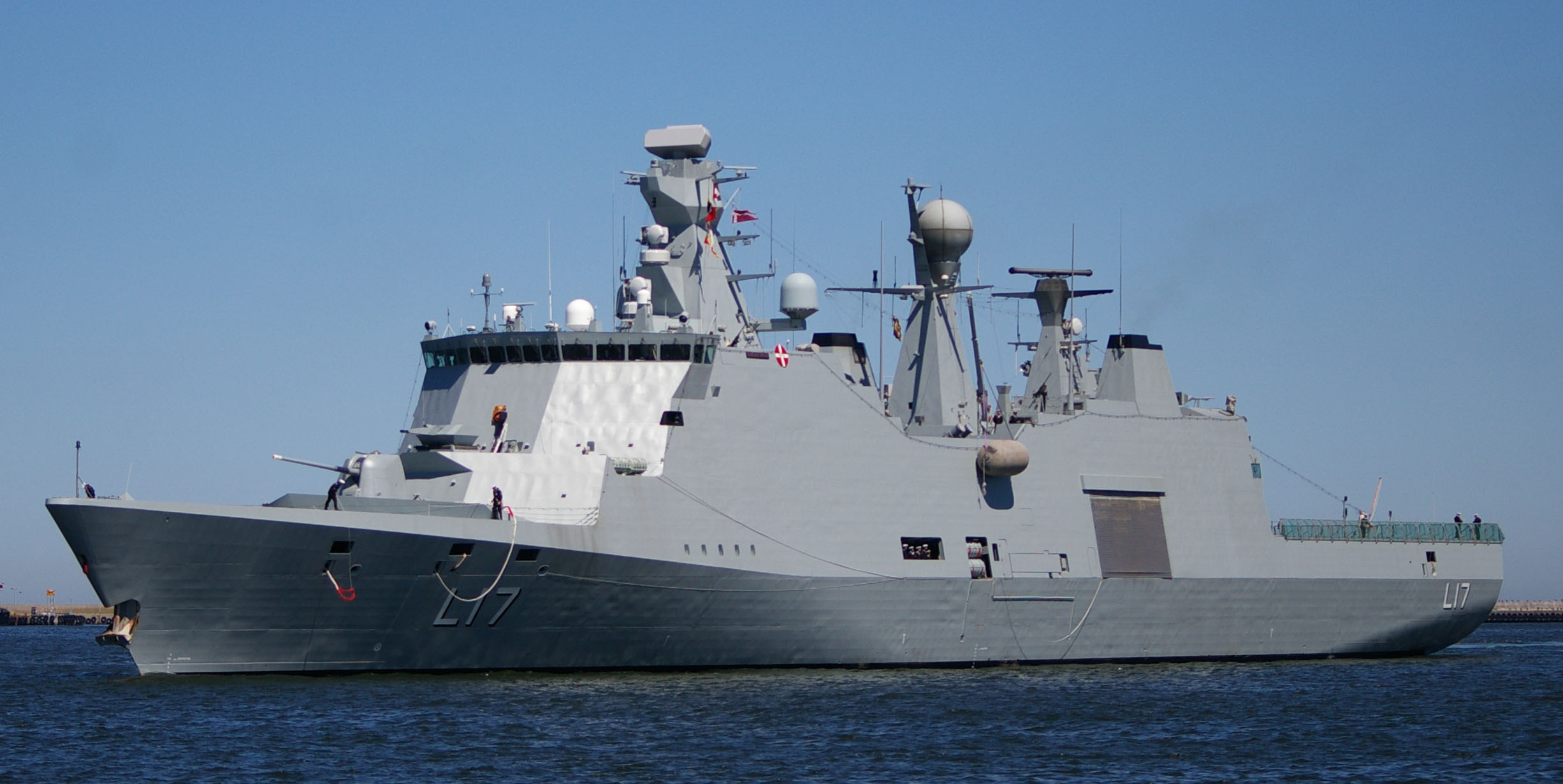
Esbern Snare, the frigate Francis on 24 November 2021 attacked, was wounded by and detained on

In November 2021, HDMS Esbern Snare was in the Gulf of Guinea as part of Denmark's military counter-piracy efforts. The frigate intercepted a dinghy with armed individuals heading towards several merchant ships.

During a boarding operation, pirates opened fire on a RHIB boat manned by soldiers from the Frogman Corps. The Danish soldiers returned fire. In the firefight, four pirates were killed. No Danish soldiers were injured, but the RHIB boat was hit by gunfire.

Four pirates survived and were detained aboard the Esbern Snare. The incident took place approximately 25–30 nautical miles (46–56 km) south of Nigeria's territorial waters. Several experts criticised Defence Minister Trine Bramsen for poor planning.

== Wounds and medical treatment ==
Lucky Francis was seriously injured during the firefight. His injuries were assessed as life-threatening, and an emergency operation was performed aboard the frigate, where one leg was amputated. On board the frigate, Lucky contracted an infection that required another operation. During the operation, there was a lack of hospital equipment, and the operation took place without sterile surgical gowns for everyone. The book Piratjagt stated that the serious infection and subsequent operation could possibly have been avoided if all medical equipment had been available, which the then ship's commander Lars Povl Jensen denied.

Due to his health condition, he was subsequently flown to Denmark for further treatment in hospital. As of January 2023, he had not yet received a leg prosthesis. DR described that the authorities could not agree on who should pay for the prosthesis. He was granted a leg prosthesis in June 2023, while he was in Center Sandholm. The Telegraph wrote that he had entered into a special agreement with the government.

== Prosecution in Denmark ==
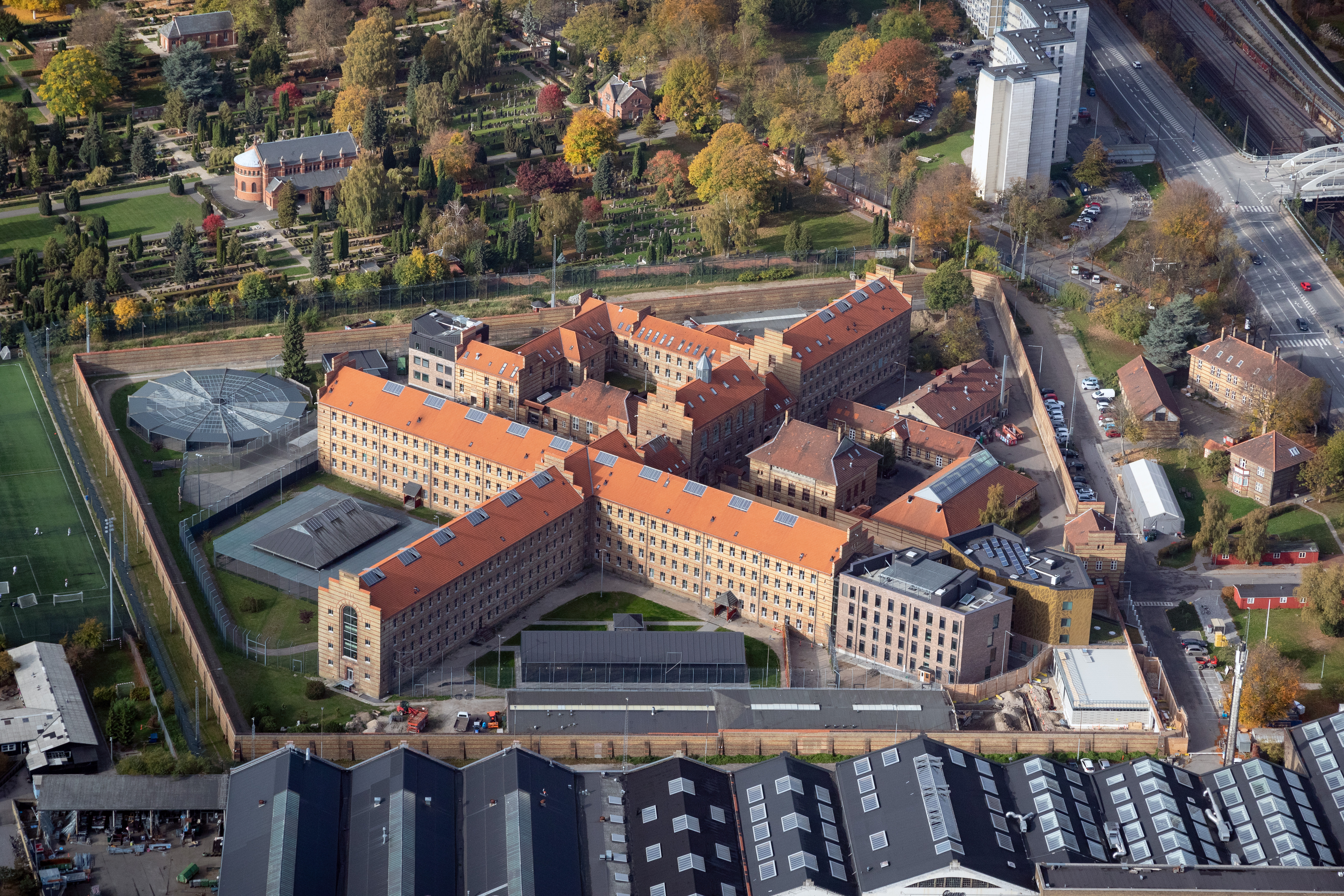
Vestre Prison, where Francis was held in custody for 384 days

Lucky Francis was charged in a Danish court for, among other things, endangering the lives of Danish soldiers during the armed confrontation. He was held in custody at Vestre Prison during the case. The three other surviving pirates were dropped from the charges and released near the coast of Nigeria. He arrived at Vestre Prison's infirmary on 7 January 2022 and the name ban was lifted on 21 November 2022. Francis pleaded not guilty and explained during a court hearing that the case was about 'Big money'.

The court found Francis guilty, but did not sentence him to a prison sentence. He was found guilty under section 252(1) of the Danish Penal Code on endangerment. The decision placed emphasis on his serious health condition after the amputations and on proportionality considerations, including the fact that the other pirates had not been prosecuted. In August 2024, the Copenhagen City Court refused to award him compensation. The State Prosecutor for Serious Crime (SSK) and the Attorney General had previously also refused.

== Residence permit and asylum ==
In February 2023, he applied for asylum in Denmark. After the verdict, Lucky Francis was granted a residence permit in Denmark in January 2024. Prime Minister Mette Frederiksen said, "By God, I can neither explain nor defend that. It's a shameful matter. It's a pain. I don't think he belongs in Denmark." Francis himself said about his situation, "I don't want to go back and live the life I lived before. It's too physically demanding, I'm not capable of that with only one leg."

According to the authorities, he could not be sent to Nigeria due to health reasons and Denmark's international obligations. He was also included in a possible integration and rehabilitation effort, including Danish language instruction and employment-oriented offers to upgrade his qualifications for the Danish labour market. Several Danish politicians criticised these offers.
