= Jeppe Bruus Christensen =

Danish politician (born 1978)

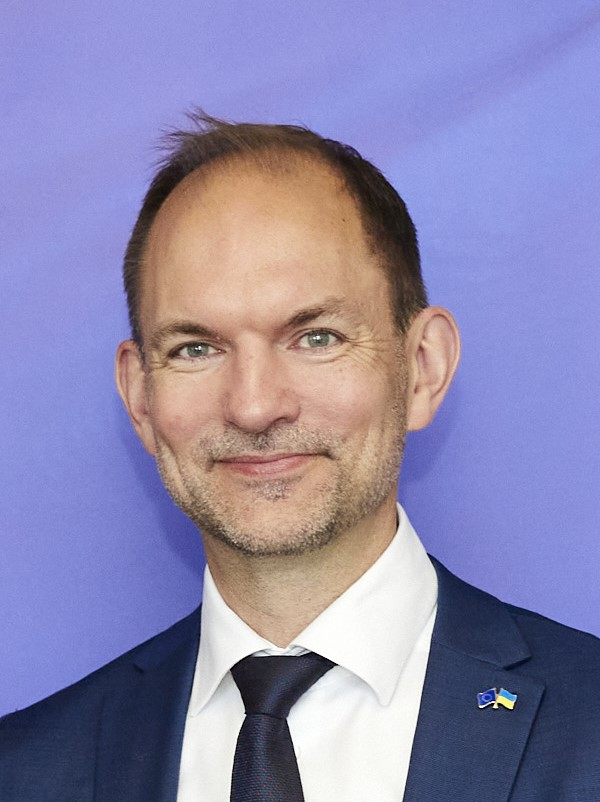
- Bruus Christensen in 2025

Minister of Defence
- Incumbent
- Assumed office 3 June 2026
- Prime Minister: Mette Frederiksen
- Preceded by: Troels Lund Poulsen

Minister for Taxation
- In office 4 February 2022 – 29 August 2024
- Prime Minister: Mette Frederiksen
- Preceded by: Morten Bødskov
- Succeeded by: Rasmus Stoklund

Member of the Folketing
- Incumbent
- Assumed office 5 June 2019
- Constituency: Greater Copenhagen
- In office 1 January 2014 – 18 June 2015
- Constituency: Greater Copenhagen

Personal details
- Born: 20 April 1978 (age 48) Tølløse, Denmark
- Party: Social Democrats

Jeppe Bruus Christensen (born 20 April 1978) is a Danish politician who is a member of the Folketing for the Social Democrats. He was elected to parliament at the 2019 Danish general election. He was previously a member of parliament between 2014 and 2015.

== Political career ==
Bruus first ran for parliament in the 2011 election, where he received 2,706 votes. While not enough for a seat in parliament, it made him the Social Democrats' primary substitute in the Greater Copenhagen constituency. During the 2011-2015 term he was a temporary member of the Folketing, acting as substitute for Sophie Hæstorp Andersen from 5 November 2013 to 3 December 2013. When Hæstorp Andersen was elected as chairman of the Capital Region of Denmark in the 2013 local election, she resigned her seat. As the party's primary substitute of the constituency, Bruus took over the seat and completed the remainder of the term.

Bruus ran again in the 2015 election. He received 2,806 votes and again became the Social Democrats' primary substitute of the constituency. During the 2015-2019 term he was a substitute for Mogens Lykketoft from 4 July 2015 to 30 September 2016. In the 2019 election Bruus was finally elected into parliament, receiving 4,397 votes and winning a district seat.

=== Minister of Taxation ===
He was appointed minister of taxation on 4 February 2022 in a minor cabinet reshuffle.

Under Bruus' leadership, Denmark introduced a tax on air passengers to help finance the airline industry's transition to greener practices from 2025.

=== Minister for Green Transition ===
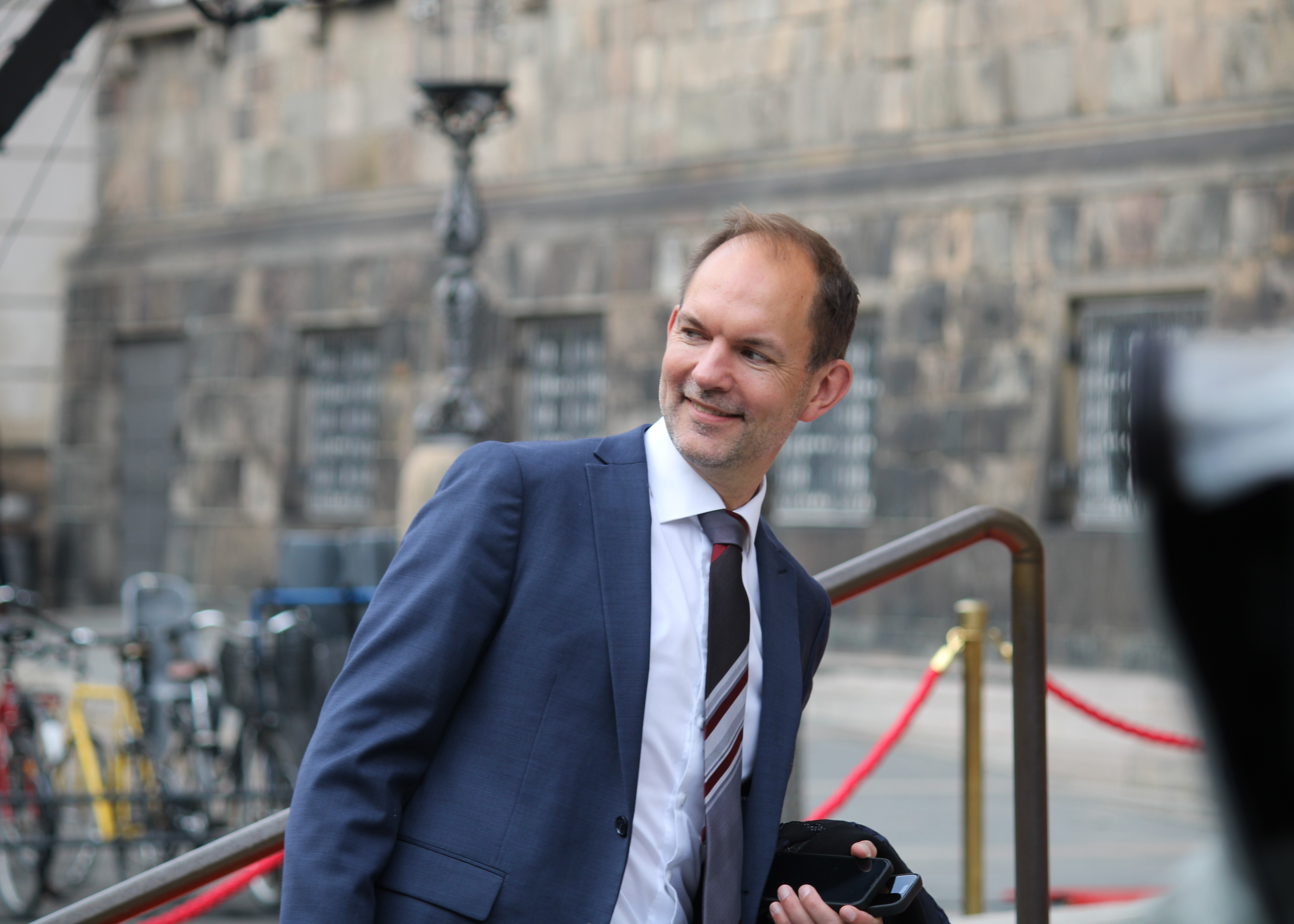
Bruus at the 2025 opening of parliament

He was appointed minister for Green Transition in a cabinet reshuffle on 29 August 2024.
