= List of members of the Folketing, 1994–1998 =

63th Folketing
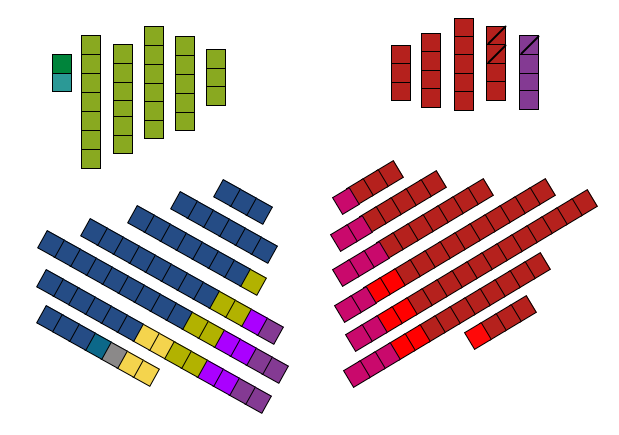
- Term: 21 September 1994 - 11 March 1998
- Speaker: A Erling Olsen
- Prime Minister: A Poul Nyrup Rasmussen
- Cabinet: Nyrup Rasmussen II; Nyrup Rasmussen III
- Previous: 1990-1994
- Next: 1998-2001

This is a list of the 179 members of the Folketing, in the 1994 to 1998 session. They were elected at the 1994 general election.

== Election results ==
Denmark proper
Party	Votes	%	Seats	+/–
Social Democratic Party	1,150,048	34.6	62	–7
Venstre	775,176	23.3	42	+13
Conservative People's Party	499,845	15.0	27	–3
Socialist People's Party	242,398	7.3	13	–2
Progress Party	214,057	6.4	11	–1
Danish Social Liberal Party	152,701	4.6	8	+1
Red-Green Alliance	104,701	3.1	6	+6
Centre Democrats	94,496	2.8	5	–4
Christian People's Party	61,507	1.9	0	–4
Independents	32,668	1.0	1	+1
Invalid/blank votes	33,040	–	–	–
Total	3,360,637	100	175	0
Faroe Islands
Union Party	4,304	22.4	1	+1
People's Party	4,159	21.7	1	0
Social Democratic Party	3,729	19.4	0	–1
Workers' Union	3,118	16.3	0	New
Republican Party	1,798	9.4	0	0
Self-Government Party	469	2.4	0	0
Christian People's Party	467	2.4	0	0
Independents	1,131	5.9	0	New
Invalid/blank votes	103	–	–	–
Total	19,278	100	2	0
Greenland
Atassut	7,501	34.7	1	0
Centre Party	1,605	7.4	0	New
Independents	12,489	57.8	1	+1
Invalid/blank votes	765	–	–	–
Total	22,360	100	2	0
Source: Nohlen & Stöver

== Seat distribution ==
Below is the distribution of the 179 seats as it appeared after the 1994 election, as well at the distribution at the end of the term.

Party	Party leader	Elected seats	End seats	Change
A Social Democrats	Poul Nyrup Rasmussen	62	62	Steady
B Social Liberal Party	Marianne Jelved	8	8	Steady
C Conservatives	Per Stig Møller	27	27	Steady
D Centre Democrats	Mimi Jakobsen	5	5	Steady
F Socialist People's Party	Holger K. Nielsen	13	13	Steady
O Danish People's Party	Pia Kjærsgaard	-	4	▲4
V Liberals	Uffe Ellemann-Jensen	42	42	Steady
Z Progress Party	Kirsten Jacobsen	11	7	▼4
Ø Red-Green Alliance	Collective leadership	6	6	Steady
FF People's Party	Anfinn Kallsberg	1	1	Steady
SP Union Party	Edmund Joensen	1	1	Steady
AT Feeling of Community	Daniel Skifte	1	1	Steady
SI Forward	Lars-Emil Johansen	1	1	Steady
. Outside group		1	1	Steady

== Parliament members elected at the September 1994 election ==
Name	Birth year	Party	Constituency
Niels Ahlmann-Olsen	1953	C Conservatives	Nordjylland
Keld Albrechtsen	1952	Ø Red-Green Alliance	Århus
Sonja Albrink	1948	D Centre Democrats	Vejle
Bent Hindrup Andersen	1943	Ø Red-Green Alliance	Vejle
Else Winther Andersen	1941	V Liberals	Århus
Hanne Andersen	1939	A Social Democrats	København
Jytte Andersen	1942	A Social Democrats	Østre
Poul Andersen	1952	A Social Democrats	Fyn
Charlotte Antonsen	1959	V Liberals	Frederiksborg
Elisabeth Arnold	1941	B Social Liberal Party	Århus
Margrete Auken	1945	F Socialist People's Party	Frederiksborg
Svend Auken	1943	A Social Democrats	Århus
Kai Dige Bach	1936	C Conservatives	København
Børge Bakholt	1935	A Social Democrats	Fyn
Kim Behnke	1960	Z Progress Party	Århus
Tom Behnke	1966	Z Progress Party	København
Helen Beim	1943	A Social Democrats	Roskilde
Bendt Bendtsen	1954	C Conservatives	Fyn
Dorte Bennedsen	1938	A Social Democrats	København
Inger Bierbaum	1943	A Social Democrats	Sønderjylland
Ritt Bjerregaard	1941	A Social Democrats	Fyn
Mariann Fischer Boel	1943	V Liberals	Fyn
Óli Breckmann	1948	FF People's Party	Faroe Islands
Peter Brixtofte	1949	V Liberals	Fyn
Aage Brusgaard	1947	Z Progress Party	Viborg
Jacob Buksti	1947	A Social Democrats	Vestre
Hans Peter Baadsgaard	1937	A Social Democrats	Århus
Anne Baastrup	1952	F Socialist People's Party	Roskilde
Erling Christensen	1942	A Social Democrats	Fyn
Jan Køpke Christensen	1955	Z Progress Party	Sønderjylland
Ole Vagn Christensen	1943	A Social Democrats	Viborg
Peter Christian Christensen	1939	A Social Democrats	Århus
Pia Christmas-Møller	1961	C Conservatives	Vejle
Hans Peter Clausen	1928	C Conservatives	Århus
Inge Dahl-Sørensen	1947	V Liberals	Østre
Kristian Thulesen Dahl	1969	Z Progress Party	Vejle
Frank Dahlgaard	1946	C Conservatives	Østre
Helle Degn	1946	A Social Democrats	København
Tommy Dinesen	1939	F Socialist People's Party	Vestsjælland
Ole Donner	1939	Z Progress Party	Frederiksborg
Peter Duetoft	1950	D Centre Democrats	Nordjylland
Poul Erik Dyrlund	1949	A Social Democrats	Vestsjælland
Uffe Ellemann-Jensen	1941	V Liberals	Århus
Bjørn Elmquist	1938	B Social Liberal Party	København
Hans Engell	1948	C Conservatives	Frederiksborg
Knud Enggaard	1929	V Liberals	Århus
Lene Espersen	1965	C Conservatives	Nordjylland
Jørgen Estrup	1942	B Social Liberal Party	Østre
Eva Fatum	1947	A Social Democrats	Bornholm
Tove Fergo	1946	V Liberals	København
Ove Fich	1949	A Social Democrats	Roskilde
Aage Frandsen	1941	F Socialist People's Party	Århus
Steen Gade	1945	F Socialist People's Party	Fyn
Henning Gjellerod	1940	A Social Democrats	Ringkøbing
Pia Gjellerup	1959	A Social Democrats	Vestre
Martin Glerup	1943	A Social Democrats	Nordjylland
Jette Gottlieb	1948	Ø Red-Green Alliance	Østre
Holger Graversen	1936	A Social Democrats	Nordjylland
Lis Greibe	1939	A Social Democrats	Sønderjylland
Henning Grove	1932	C Conservatives	Viborg
Jonna Grønver	1946	V Liberals	Århus
Peter Hansen-Nord	1947	V Liberals	Vestsjælland
Anna-Marie Hansen	1943	A Social Democrats	Viborg
Eva Kjer Hansen	1964	V Liberals	Vejle
Flemming Hansen	1939	C Conservatives	Vejle
Hardy Hansen	1933	A Social Democrats	Østre
Ivar Hansen	1938	V Liberals	Ribe
Søren Hansen	1942	A Social Democrats	Vestsjælland
Jacob Haugaard	1952	. Outside group	Århus
Svend Heiselberg	1935	V Liberals	Viborg
Lotte Henriksen	1963	A Social Democrats	Frederiksborg
Jytte Hilden	1942	A Social Democrats	Vestsjælland
Birthe Rønn Hornbech	1943	V Liberals	Roskilde
Svend Erik Hovmand	1945	V Liberals	Storstrøm
Hans Hækkerup	1945	A Social Democrats	Vestsjælland
Klaus Hækkerup	1943	A Social Democrats	Frederiksborg
Niels Jørn Højland	1954	Z Progress Party	Ringkøbing
Bertel Haarder	1944	V Liberals	København
Kaj Ikast	1935	C Conservatives	Sønderjylland
Erhard Jacobsen	1917	D Centre Democrats	Frederiksborg
Erik Jacobsen	1940	V Liberals	Sønderjylland
Kirsten Jacobsen	1942	Z Progress Party	Nordjylland
Mimi Jakobsen	1948	D Centre Democrats	København
Marianne Jelved	1943	B Social Liberal Party	Nordjylland
Svend Aage Jensby	1940	V Liberals	Nordjylland
Anders Mølgaard Jensen	1958	V Liberals	Vejle
Frank Jensen	1961	A Social Democrats	Nordjylland
Karen Højte Jensen	1938	C Conservatives	Roskilde
Ole Vig Jensen	1936	B Social Liberal Party	Vestsjælland
Bruno Jerup	1957	Ø Red-Green Alliance	Fyn
Jørn Jespersen	1955	F Socialist People's Party	Storstrøm
Karen Jespersen	1947	V Liberals	København
Edmund Joensen	1944	SP Union Party	Faroe Islands
Annette Just	1947	Z Progress Party	Østre
Jens Jørgensen	1942	C Conservatives	Vestsjælland
Poul Qvist Jørgensen	1941	A Social Democrats	Sønderjylland
Jens Kirk	1942	V Liberals	Ringkøbing
Kent Kirk	1948	C Conservatives	Ribe
Henriette Kjær	1966	C Conservatives	Århus
Pia Kjærsgaard	1947	Z Progress Party	Fyn
Jens Risgaard Knudsen	1925	A Social Democrats	Nordjylland
Niels Anker Kofoed	1929	V Liberals	Bornholm
Henrik Dam Kristensen	1957	A Social Democrats	Ribe
Per Kaalund	1937	A Social Democrats	København
Niels Jørgen Langkilde	1952	C Conservatives	Fyn
Erik Larsen	1944	V Liberals	Fyn
Ester Larsen	1936	V Liberals	Vestsjælland
Pia Larsen	1956	V Liberals	København
Tove Lindbo Larsen	1928	A Social Democrats	Søndre
Agnete Laustsen	1935	C Conservatives	Søndre
Torben Lund	1950	A Social Democrats	Vejle
Jes Lunde	1956	F Socialist People's Party	Nordjylland
Anne Birgitte Lundholt	1952	C Conservatives	Ringkøbing
Mogens Lykketoft	1946	A Social Democrats	København
Jens Hald Madsen	1968	V Liberals	Roskilde
Jens Løgstrup Madsen	1961	V Liberals	Søndre
Jytte Madsen	1939	A Social Democrats	Århus
Lissa Mathiasen	1948	A Social Democrats	Vejle
Christian Mejdahl	1939	V Liberals	Nordjylland
Arne Melchior	1924	D Centre Democrats	Århus
Anne-Marie Meldgaard	1948	A Social Democrats	Århus
Brian Mikkelsen	1966	C Conservatives	Vestsjælland
Sonja Mikkelsen	1955	A Social Democrats	Århus
Erik Mortensen	1943	A Social Democrats	Nordjylland
Helge Mortensen	1941	A Social Democrats	Ribe
Kim Mouritsen	1969	V Liberals	Nordjylland
Eva Møller	1940	C Conservatives	Frederiksborg
Helge Adam Møller	1942	C Conservatives	Storstrøm
Kjeld Rahbæk Møller	1938	F Socialist People's Party	Søndre
Lone Møller	1949	A Social Democrats	Frederiksborg
Per Stig Møller	1942	C Conservatives	Vestre
Elsebeth Gerner Nielsen	1960	B Social Liberal Party	Vejle
Holger K. Nielsen	1950	F Socialist People's Party	København
Poul Nielson	1943	A Social Democrats	Vejle
Poul Nødgaard	1936	Z Progress Party	Vestsjælland
Frederik Nørgaard	1940	A Social Democrats	Fyn
Erling Olsen	1927	A Social Democrats	Østre
Flemming Oppfeldt	1956	V Liberals	Storstrøm
Erling Oxdam	1932	V Liberals	Vestre
Jørn Pedersen	1947	A Social Democrats	Århus
Thor Pedersen	1945	V Liberals	Frederiksborg
Vibeke Peschardt	1939	B Social Liberal Party	Frederiksborg
Gert Petersen	1927	F Socialist People's Party	Østre
Jan Petersen	1958	A Social Democrats	Århus
Niels Helveg Petersen	1939	B Social Liberal Party	Fyn
Anders Fogh Rasmussen	1953	V Liberals	Viborg
Ingrid Rasmussen	1947	A Social Democrats	Storstrøm
Lars Løkke Rasmussen	1964	V Liberals	Frederiksborg
Poul Nyrup Rasmussen	1943	A Social Democrats	Ringkøbing
Stefan G. Rasmussen	1947	C Conservatives	København
Torben Rechendorff	1937	C Conservatives	København
Hans-Pavia Rosing	1948	SI Forward	Greenland
Pernille Sams	1959	C Conservatives	Århus
Helge Sander	1950	V Liberals	Ringkøbing
Peder Sass	1943	A Social Democrats	Storstrøm
Hans Christian Schmidt	1953	V Liberals	Sønderjylland
Grete Schødts	1945	A Social Democrats	Fyn
Gitte Seeberg	1960	C Conservatives	København
Hanne Severinsen	1944	V Liberals	Ringkøbing
Ole Løvig Simonsen	1935	A Social Democrats	Storstrøm
Ole Stavad	1949	A Social Democrats	Nordjylland
Otto Steenholdt	1936	AT Feeling of Community	Greenland
Anni Svanholt	1947	F Socialist People's Party	Århus
Peder Sønderby	1932	V Liberals	Sønderjylland
Søren Søndergaard	1955	Ø Red-Green Alliance	København
Villy Søvndal	1952	F Socialist People's Party	Vejle
Bodil Thrane	1943	V Liberals	Nordjylland
Kristen Touborg	1943	F Socialist People's Party	Ringkøbing
Jan Trøjborg	1955	A Social Democrats	Vejle
Ulla Tørnæs	1962	V Liberals	Ribe
Henning Urup	1953	V Liberals	Ribe
Jens Peter Vernersen	1947	A Social Democrats	Ringkøbing
Jens Vibjerg	1949	V Liberals	Vejle
John Vinther	1965	C Conservatives	København
Birte Weiss	1941	A Social Democrats	Søndre
Bjørn Westh	1944	A Social Democrats	Viborg
Jørgen Winther	1945	V Liberals	Århus
Jytte Wittrock	1945	A Social Democrats	Storstrøm
Frank Aaen	1951	Ø Red-Green Alliance	Nordjylland

== Party and member changes after the September 1994 elections ==
=== Party changes ===
Below are all parliament members that have joined another party or become independent during the term.

Name	Old party	Constituency	New party	Date
Kristian Thulesen Dahl	Z Progress Party	Vejle	O Danish People's Party	6 October 1995
Ole Donner	Z Progress Party	Frederiksborg	O Danish People's Party	6 October 1995
Pia Kjærsgaard	Z Progress Party	Fyn	O Danish People's Party	6 October 1995
Poul Nødgaard	Z Progress Party	Vestsjælland	O Danish People's Party	6 October 1995

=== Lasting member changes ===
Below are member changes that lasted through the entire term.

Replacement	Birth year	Party	Constituency	Replaced MP	Date	Reason
Else Marie Mortensen	1946	A Social Democrats	Fyn	Ritt Bjerregaard	23 January 1995	Bjerregaard resigned her seat.
Addi Andersen	1928	D Centre Democrats	Frederiksborg	Erhard Jacobsen	15 October 1995	Jacobsen resigned his seat.
Grethe Rostbøll	1941	C Conservatives	København	Stefan G. Rasmussen	3 November 1996	Rasmussen resigned his seat.
Kim Skibsted	1965	A Social Democrats	Nordjylland	Jens Risgaard Knudsen	30 January 1997	Knudsen passed away.
Christian Aagaard	1937	C Conservatives	Århus	Hans Peter Clausen	1 May 1997	Clausen resigned his seat.
Knud Erik Kirkegaard	1942	C Conservatives	Ringkøbing	Anne Birgitte Lundholt	9 October 1997	Lundholt resigned her seat.
Hanne Christensen	1942	V Liberals	Ringkøbing	Helge Sander	1 February 1998	Sander resigned his seat.

=== Temporary member changes ===
Below are temporary member replacements during the term.

Replacement	Birth year	Party	Constituency	Replaced MP	Start	End	Length
Ole Sohn	1954	F Socialist People's Party	Vestsjællands		6 October 1994	22 October 1994	16 days
Irene Sønderby	1951	D Centre Democrats	Århus	Arne Melchior	6 October 1994	19 October 1994	13 days
Johannes Martin Olsen	1933	SP Union Party	Faroe Islands	Edmund Joensen	13 October 1994	10 March 1998	1,244 days
Hans Jørgen Jensen	1929	A Social Democrats			15 October 1994	16 January 1995	93 days
Poul Brix		V Liberals	København	Pia Larsen	1 November 1994	25 November 1994	24 days
Mads Lebech	1967	C Conservatives	Vestre	Per Stig Møller	1 November 1994	27 November 1994	26 days
Mogens Christensen		Z Progress Party	Fyn	Pia Kjærsgaard	1 November 1994	28 November 1994	27 days
Annette Nordstrøm Hansen		F Socialist People's Party	Østre	Gert Petersen	1 November 1994	28 November 1994	27 days
Gunhild Husum	1943	B Social Liberal Party	Århus	Elisabeth Arnold	1 November 1994	28 November 1994	27 days
Finn Rudaizky	1942	A Social Democrats	Søndre	Tove Lindbo Larsen	1 November 1994	28 November 1994	27 days
Dorit Myltoft	1943	B Social Liberal Party			8 November 1994	14 November 1994	6 days
Lisbeth Arbøl	1958	D Centre Democrats	Nordjylland	Peter Duetoft	15 November 1994	21 November 1994	6 days
Inger Marie Bruun-Vierø	1942	B Social Liberal Party	Østre	Jørgen Estrup	15 November 1994	21 November 1994	6 days
Dorit Myltoft	1943	B Social Liberal Party			29 November 1994	11 December 1994	12 days
Lise Hækkerup	1947	A Social Democrats			6 December 1994	18 December 1994	12 days
Jørgen Lund		Ø Red-Green Alliance			6 December 1994	16 December 1994	10 days
Søren Pind	1969	V Liberals	Bornholm	Niels Anker Kofoed	13 December 1994	19 December 1994	6 days
Dorit Myltoft	1943	B Social Liberal Party			17 January 1995	10 February 1995	24 days
Birgit Thye-Petersen		V Liberals			17 January 1995	14 June 1995	148 days
Hans Jørgen Jensen	1929	A Social Democrats			26 January 1995	3 February 1995	8 days
Lars Jørgensen	1968	C Conservatives	Søndre	Agnete Laustsen	30 January 1995	5 March 1995	34 days
Gunhild Husum	1943	B Social Liberal Party	Århus	Elisabeth Arnold	31 January 1995	6 February 1995	6 days
Jens Vognsen		A Social Democrats			31 January 1995	9 February 1995	9 days
Poul Brix		V Liberals			14 March 1995	6 April 1995	23 days
Hans Jørgen Jensen	1929	A Social Democrats			28 March 1995	3 April 1995	6 days
Lise Hækkerup	1947	A Social Democrats	Østre	Jytte Andersen	28 March 1995	3 April 1995	6 days
Dorit Myltoft	1943	B Social Liberal Party			18 April 1995	31 May 1995	43 days
Søren Sørensen		V Liberals			18 April 1995	26 April 1995	8 days
Kjeld Espersen		A Social Democrats			25 April 1995	7 May 1995	12 days
Gunhild Husum	1943	B Social Liberal Party	Århus	Elisabeth Arnold	12 May 1995	18 May 1995	6 days
Lisbeth Arbøl	1958	D Centre Democrats			15 May 1995	21 May 1995	6 days
Irene Sønderby	1951	D Centre Democrats	Århus	Arne Melchior	15 May 1995	21 May 1995	6 days
Kim Henning		C Conservatives			5 October 1995	13 October 1995	8 days
Kim Skibsted	1965	A Social Democrats			5 October 1995	13 October 1995	8 days
Ulla Blok Kristensen		F Socialist People's Party			5 October 1995	19 October 1995	14 days
Lars Kaspersen		B Social Liberal Party			5 October 1995	20 October 1995	15 days
Jørgen Lund		Ø Red-Green Alliance			5 October 1995	23 October 1995	18 days
Kim Andersen	1957	V Liberals	Vejle		24 October 1995	17 November 1995	24 days
Frank Bøgh		F Socialist People's Party			24 October 1995	17 November 1995	24 days
Hans Jørgen Jensen	1929	A Social Democrats			24 October 1995	17 November 1995	24 days
Grethe Rostbøll	1941	C Conservatives			24 October 1995	17 November 1995	24 days
Irene Sønderby	1951	D Centre Democrats	Århus	Arne Melchior	24 October 1995	17 November 1995	24 days
Kjeld Espersen		A Social Democrats			24 October 1995	30 October 1995	6 days
Hugo Sørensen	1942	A Social Democrats	Århus	Jytte Madsen	24 October 1995	8 January 1996	76 days
Hans Erik Hillerup-Jensen		D Centre Democrats			23 November 1995	1 December 1995	8 days
Dorit Myltoft	1943	B Social Liberal Party			28 November 1995	15 December 1995	17 days
Kim Andersen	1957	V Liberals	Vejle		12 December 1995	18 December 1995	6 days
Gudrun Laub	1941	V Liberals			14 December 1995	20 December 1995	6 days
Gunhild Husum	1943	B Social Liberal Party	Århus	Elisabeth Arnold	16 January 1996	25 January 1996	9 days
Søren Sørensen		V Liberals			16 January 1996	25 January 1996	9 days
Kjeld Espersen		A Social Democrats			16 January 1996	26 January 1996	10 days
Lise Rasmussen		A Social Democrats			16 January 1996	26 January 1996	10 days
Kim Skibsted	1965	A Social Democrats			16 January 1996	26 January 1996	10 days
Hans Jørgen Jensen	1929	A Social Democrats			6 February 1996	12 February 1996	6 days
Henrik Svane	1947	B Social Liberal Party			6 February 1996	12 February 1996	6 days
Michael Gammelgaard		A Social Democrats			22 February 1996	29 February 1996	7 days
Dorit Myltoft	1943	B Social Liberal Party			22 February 1996	29 February 1996	7 days
Thomas Adelskov	1964	A Social Democrats			19 March 1996	25 March 1996	6 days
Bjarne Petersen		A Social Democrats			19 March 1996	25 March 1996	6 days
Hans Jørgen Jensen	1929	A Social Democrats			9 April 1996	15 April 1996	6 days
Thomas Adelskov	1964	A Social Democrats			9 April 1996	19 April 1996	10 days
Helen Jørgensen		A Social Democrats			9 April 1996	19 April 1996	10 days
Thomas Torp Andersen		C Conservatives			16 April 1996	1 May 1996	15 days
Dorit Myltoft	1943	B Social Liberal Party			19 April 1996	26 April 1996	7 days
Gunhild Husum	1943	B Social Liberal Party	Århus	Elisabeth Arnold	23 April 1996	29 April 1996	6 days
Lisbeth Arbøl	1958	D Centre Democrats	Nordjylland	Peter Duetoft	23 April 1996	30 April 1996	7 days
Hans Jørgen Jensen	1929	A Social Democrats			7 May 1996	13 May 1996	6 days
Søren Sørensen		V Liberals			7 May 1996	14 May 1996	7 days
Poul Brix		V Liberals			21 May 1996	29 May 1996	8 days
Tonna Bendtsen		A Social Democrats			3 October 1996	20 April 1997	199 days
Nina Berrig		C Conservatives			3 October 1996	11 October 1996	8 days
Finn Eriksen		D Centre Democrats	KREDS		3 October 1996	11 October 1996	8 days
Hans Jørgen Jensen	1929	A Social Democrats			3 October 1996	11 October 1996	8 days
Helge Bo Jensen		Ø Red-Green Alliance			3 October 1996	18 October 1996	15 days
Hugo Sørensen	1942	A Social Democrats	Århus	Sonja Mikkelsen	3 October 1996	2 December 1996	60 days
Lise Rasmussen		A Social Democrats			22 October 1996	6 December 1996	45 days
Birgitte Husmark	1945	F Socialist People's Party	Frederiksborg		29 October 1996	22 November 1996	24 days
Kim Andersen	1957	V Liberals	Vejle		29 October 1996	22 November 1996	24 days
Christian Aagaard		C Conservatives			29 October 1996	22 November 1996	24 days
Kjeld Espersen		A Social Democrats			29 October 1996	25 November 1996	27 days
Susanne Fast Jensen	1951	A Social Democrats	Roskilde	Klaus Hækkerup	29 October 1996	25 November 1996	27 days
Helen Jørgensen		A Social Democrats			5 November 1996	16 December 1996	40 days
Thomas Adelskov	1964	A Social Democrats	Vestsjælland		14 November 1996	22 November 1996	8 days
Asger Jensen		A Social Democrats			14 November 1996	26 November 1996	12 days
Lisbeth Arbøl	1958	D Centre Democrats	Nordjylland	Peter Duetoft	19 November 1996	25 November 1996	6 days
Inger Marie Bruun-Vierø	1942	B Social Liberal Party	Østre	Jørgen Estrup	19 November 1996	25 November 1996	6 days
Steen Jønsson		A Social Democrats			19 November 1996	25 November 1996	6 days
Dorte Dinesen		A Social Democrats			26 November 1996	2 February 1997	68 days
Egil Møller	1941	O Danish People's Party	Frederiksborg	Ole Donner	3 December 1996	19 December 1996	16 days
Poul Brix		V Liberals			10 December 1996	17 December 1996	7 days
Ilse Hansen	1954	A Social Democrats	Nordjylland	Jens Risgaard Knudsen	14 January 1997	29 January 1997	15 days
Lars Christian Lilleholt	1965	V Liberals	Fyn		14 January 1997	31 January 1997	17 days
Kim Andersen	1957	V Liberals	Vejle		28 January 1997	10 April 1997	72 days
Gunhild Husum	1943	B Social Liberal Party	Århus	Elisabeth Arnold	28 January 1997	3 February 1997	6 days
Niels Rasmussen		A Social Democrats			28 January 1997	3 February 1997	6 days
Thomas Adelskov	1964	A Social Democrats	Vestsjælland		30 January 1997	6 February 1997	7 days
Bent Wissing		Z Progress Party			18 February 1997	27 February 1997	9 days
Nina Berrig		C Conservatives			18 February 1997	28 February 1997	10 days
Helen Jørgensen		A Social Democrats			11 March 1997	17 March 1997	6 days
Dorit Myltoft	1943	B Social Liberal Party			13 March 1997	10 March 1998	362 days
Ulla Solvang		B Social Liberal Party			13 March 1997	10 March 1998	362 days
Henrik Svane	1947	B Social Liberal Party			13 March 1997	10 March 1998	362 days
Hugo Sørensen	1942	A Social Democrats	Århus	Svend Auken	13 March 1997	19 March 1997	6 days
Evald Zacho		A Social Democrats			13 March 1997	17 March 1997	4 days
Helen Jørgensen		A Social Democrats			18 March 1997	19 May 1997	62 days
Kjeld Espersen		A Social Democrats			3 April 1997	16 April 1997	13 days
Hans Jørgen Jensen	1929	A Social Democrats			8 April 1997	15 April 1997	7 days
Helge Bo Jensen		Ø Red-Green Alliance			8 April 1997	15 April 1997	7 days
Niels Rasmussen		A Social Democrats			8 April 1997	15 April 1997	7 days
Evald Zacho		A Social Democrats			8 April 1997	18 April 1997	10 days
Johannes Sørensen		Z Progress Party			30 April 1997	16 May 1997	16 days
Jens Vognsen		A Social Democrats			13 May 1997	23 May 1997	10 days
Helen Jørgensen		A Social Democrats			20 May 1997	31 May 1997	11 days
Hugo Sørensen	1942	A Social Democrats	Århus	Svend Auken	20 May 1997	27 May 1997	7 days
Søren Pind	1969	V Liberals	Bornholm	Niels Anker Kofoed	26 May 1997	1 June 1997	6 days
Niels Rasmussen		A Social Democrats			27 May 1997	2 June 1997	6 days
Tonna Bendtsen		A Social Democrats			28 October 1997	21 November 1997	24 days
Elisabeth Ehmer		C Conservatives			28 October 1997	21 November 1997	24 days
Lise Rasmussen		A Social Democrats			28 October 1997	21 November 1997	24 days
Birgit Thye-Petersen		V Liberals			28 October 1997	21 November 1997	24 days
Hanne Christensen	1942	V Liberals	Ringkøbing	Hanne Severinsen	28 October 1997	21 November 1997	24 days
Vibeke Kiil		D Centre Democrats			4 November 1997	23 February 1998	111 days
Ole Sohn	1954	F Socialist People's Party	Vestsjællands		28 November 1997	15 December 1997	17 days
Hugo Sørensen	1942	A Social Democrats	Århus	Peter Christensen	2 December 1997	8 December 1997	6 days
Anders Samuelsen	1967	B Social Liberal Party	Vejle		5 December 1997	11 December 1997	6 days
Erik Voss		Ø Red-Green Alliance			5 December 1997	11 December 1997	6 days
Hugo Sørensen	1942	A Social Democrats	Århus	Jytte Madsen	9 December 1997	13 January 1998	35 days
Johannes Sørensen		Z Progress Party			9 December 1997	19 December 1997	10 days
Thomas Adelskov	1964	A Social Democrats			22 January 1998	2 February 1998	11 days
Gunhild Husum	1943	B Social Liberal Party	Århus	Elisabeth Arnold	26 January 1998	2 February 1998	7 days
Thomas Adelskov	1964	A Social Democrats			17 February 1998	23 February 1998	6 days
