= List of members of the Folketing, 1998–2001 =

64th Folketing
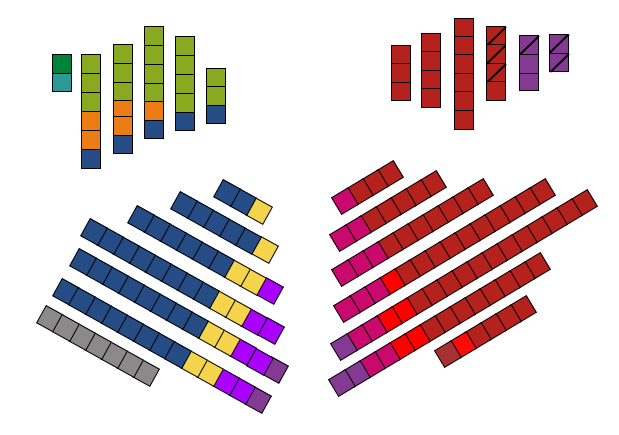
- Term: 11 March 1998 - 20 November 2001
- Speaker: V Ivar Hansen
- Prime Minister: A Poul Nyrup Rasmussen
- Cabinet: Nyrup Rasmussen IV
- Previous: 1994-1998
- Next: 2001-2005

This is a list of the 179 members of the Folketing, in the 1998 to 2001 session. They were elected at the 1998 general election.

== Election results ==
Denmark proper
Party	Votes	%	Seats	+/–
Social Democratic Party	1,223,620	35.9	63	+1
Venstre	817,894	24.0	42	0
Conservative People's Party	303,965	8.9	16	–11
Socialist People's Party	257,406	7.6	13	0
Danish People's Party	252,429	7.4	13	New
Centre Democrats	146,802	4.3	8	+3
Danish Social Liberal Party	131,254	3.9	7	–1
Red-Green Alliance	91,933	2.7	5	–1
Christian People's Party	85,656	2.5	4	+4
Progress Party	82,437	2.4	4	–7
Democratic Renewal	10,768	0.3	0	New
Independents	1,833	0.1	0	–1
Invalid/blank votes	25,929	–	–	–
Total	3,431,926	100	175	0
Faroe Islands
People's Party	5,569	26.9	1	0
Social Democratic Party	4,689	22.7	1	+1
Union Party	4,510	21.8	0	–1
Republican Party	4,325	20.9	0	0
Self-Government Party	1,603	7.7	0	0
Invalid/blank votes	146	–	–	–
Total	20,842	100	2	0
Greenland
Siumut	8,502	36.5	1	New
Atassut	8,404	36.1	1	0
Inuit Ataqatigiit	4,988	21.4	0	New
Centre Party	99	0.4	0	0
Independents	1,293	5.6	0	–1
Invalid/blank votes	891	–	–	–
Total	24,117	100	2	0
Source: Nohlen & Stöver

== Seat distribution ==
Below is the distribution of the 179 seats as it appeared after the 1998 election, as well at the distribution at the end of the term.

Party	Party leader	Elected seats	End seats	Change
A Social Democrats	Poul Nyrup Rasmussen	63	63	Steady
B Social Liberal Party	Marianne Jelved	7	7	Steady
C Conservatives	Bendt Bendtsen	16	16	Steady
D Centre Democrats	Mimi Jakobsen	8	7	▼1
F Socialist People's Party	Holger K. Nielsen	13	13	Steady
O Danish People's Party	Pia Kjærsgaard	13	10	▼3
Q Christian People's Party	Jann Sjursen	4	5	▲1
V Liberals	Anders Fogh Rasmussen	42	42	Steady
Z Progress Party	Aase Heskjær	4	-	▼4
Ø Red-Green Alliance	Collective leadership	5	5	Steady
FF People's Party	Anfinn Kallsberg	1	1	Steady
JF Social Democratic Party	Jóannes Eidesgaard	1	1	Steady
AT Feeling of Community	Daniel Skifte	1	1	Steady
SI Forward	Hans Enoksen	1	1	Steady
. Outside group		-	7	▲7

== Parliament members elected at the March 1998 election ==
Name	Birth year	Party	Constituency
Keld Albrechtsen	1952	Ø Red-Green Alliance	Århus
Sonja Albrink	1948	D Centre Democrats	Vejle
Else Winther Andersen	1941	V Liberals	Århus
Hanne Andersen	1939	A Social Democrats	København
Jytte Andersen	1942	A Social Democrats	Østre
Kim Andersen	1957	V Liberals	Århus
Poul Andersen	1952	A Social Democrats	Fyn
Yvonne Herløv Andersen	1942	D Centre Democrats	Frederiksborg
Mogens Andreasen	1931	O Danish People's Party	Roskilde
Charlotte Antonsen	1959	V Liberals	Frederiksborg
Christine Antorini	1965	F Socialist People's Party	Østre
Elisabeth Arnold	1941	B Social Liberal Party	Århus
Margrete Auken	1945	F Socialist People's Party	Frederiksborg
Svend Auken	1943	A Social Democrats	Århus
Kim Behnke	1960	Z Progress Party	Århus
Tom Behnke	1966	Z Progress Party	København
Helen Beim	1943	A Social Democrats	Roskilde
Bendt Bendtsen	1954	C Conservatives	Fyn
Dorte Bennedsen	1938	A Social Democrats	København
Inger Bierbaum	1943	A Social Democrats	Sønderjylland
René Skau Björnsson	1967	A Social Democrats	Århus
Mariann Fischer Boel	1943	V Liberals	Fyn
Óli Breckmann	1948	FF People's Party	Faroe Islands
Peter Brixtofte	1949	V Liberals	Fyn
Jacob Buksti	1947	A Social Democrats	Vestre
Lotte Bundsgaard	1973	A Social Democrats	Fyn
Hans Peter Baadsgaard	1937	A Social Democrats	Århus
Anne Baastrup	1952	F Socialist People's Party	Roskilde
Erling Christensen	1942	A Social Democrats	Fyn
Ole Vagn Christensen	1943	A Social Democrats	Viborg
Pia Christmas-Møller	1961	C Conservatives	København
Susanne Clemensen	1970	D Centre Democrats	Østre
Inge Dahl-Sørensen	1947	V Liberals	Østre
Kristian Thulesen Dahl	1969	O Danish People's Party	Fyn
Frank Dahlgaard	1946	C Conservatives	Østre
Helle Degn	1946	A Social Democrats	København
Ole Donner	1939	O Danish People's Party	Nordjylland
Peter Duetoft	1950	D Centre Democrats	Nordjylland
Poul Erik Dyrlund	1949	A Social Democrats	Vestsjælland
Jóannes Eidesgaard	1951	JF Social Democratic Party	Faroe Islands
Uffe Ellemann-Jensen	1941	V Liberals	Århus
Hans Engell	1948	C Conservatives	Frederiksborg
Lene Espersen	1965	C Conservatives	Nordjylland
Jørgen Estrup	1942	B Social Liberal Party	Østre
Svend Aage Fauerholdt	1938	O Danish People's Party	Viborg
Tove Fergo	1946	V Liberals	København
Ove Fich	1949	A Social Democrats	Roskilde
Pernille Frahm	1954	F Socialist People's Party	Vestre
Aage Frandsen	1941	F Socialist People's Party	Århus
Thorkild Fransgaard	1943	Z Progress Party	Nordjylland
Steen Gade	1945	F Socialist People's Party	Fyn
Henning Gjellerod	1940	A Social Democrats	Ringkøbing
Pia Gjellerup	1959	A Social Democrats	Vestre
Martin Glerup	1943	A Social Democrats	Nordjylland
Jette Gottlieb	1948	Ø Red-Green Alliance	Østre
Holger Graversen	1936	A Social Democrats	Nordjylland
Lis Greibe	1939	A Social Democrats	Sønderjylland
Henning Grove	1932	C Conservatives	Viborg
Peter Hansen-Nord	1947	V Liberals	Vestsjælland
Anna-Marie Hansen	1943	A Social Democrats	Viborg
Annie Lunde Hansen	1936	D Centre Democrats	Vestsjælland
Carsten Hansen	1957	A Social Democrats	Fyn
Christian H. Hansen	1963	O Danish People's Party	Ringkøbing
Eva Kjer Hansen	1964	V Liberals	Vejle
Flemming Hansen	1939	C Conservatives	Vejle
Ivar Hansen	1938	V Liberals	Ribe
Pernille Blach Hansen	1974	A Social Democrats	Viborg
Søren Hansen	1942	A Social Democrats	Vestsjælland
Jens Heimburger	1965	C Conservatives	Storstrøm
Svend Heiselberg	1935	V Liberals	Viborg
Birthe Rønn Hornbech	1943	V Liberals	Roskilde
Svend Erik Hovmand	1945	V Liberals	Storstrøm
Rikke Hvilshøj	1970	V Liberals	Vestre
Hans Hækkerup	1945	A Social Democrats	Vestsjælland
Klaus Hækkerup	1943	A Social Democrats	Frederiksborg
Lise Hækkerup	1947	A Social Democrats	København
Ole Hækkerup	1971	A Social Democrats	Østre
Bertel Haarder	1944	V Liberals	København
Kaj Ikast	1935	C Conservatives	Sønderjylland
Erik Jacobsen	1940	V Liberals	Sønderjylland
Kirsten Jacobsen	1942	Z Progress Party	Nordjylland
Mimi Jakobsen	1948	D Centre Democrats	København
Marianne Jelved	1943	B Social Liberal Party	Nordjylland
Svend Aage Jensby	1940	V Liberals	Nordjylland
Anders Mølgaard Jensen	1958	V Liberals	Vejle
Frank Jensen	1961	A Social Democrats	Nordjylland
Kristian Jensen	1971	V Liberals	Ringkøbing
Jørn Jespersen	1955	F Socialist People's Party	Storstrøm
Karen Jespersen	1947	V Liberals	København
Ebbe Kalnæs	1948	D Centre Democrats	Fyn
Jens Kirk	1942	V Liberals	Ringkøbing
Knud Erik Kirkegaard	1942	C Conservatives	Ringkøbing
Henriette Kjær	1966	C Conservatives	Århus
Klaus Kjær	1952	O Danish People's Party	Vestsjælland
Pia Kjærsgaard	1947	O Danish People's Party	København
Harald Kjøller	1936	V Liberals	Bornholm
Karen J. Klint	1947	A Social Democrats	Vejle
Carsten Koch	1945	A Social Democrats	Frederiksborg
Flemming Kofod-Svendsen	1944	Q Christian People's Party	København
Jeppe Kofod	1974	A Social Democrats	Bornholm
Søren Kolstrup	1947	Ø Red-Green Alliance	Fyn
Gyda Kongsted	1942	V Liberals	Søndre
Ellen Kristensen	1972	AT Feeling of Community	Greenland
Henrik Dam Kristensen	1957	A Social Democrats	Ribe
Per Kaalund	1937	A Social Democrats	København
Claus Larsen-Jensen	1953	A Social Democrats	Østre
Erik Larsen	1944	V Liberals	Fyn
Ester Larsen	1936	V Liberals	Vestsjælland
Pia Larsen	1956	V Liberals	København
Bjarne Laustsen	1953	A Social Democrats	Nordjylland
Jes Lunde	1956	F Socialist People's Party	Nordjylland
Mogens Lykketoft	1946	A Social Democrats	København
Jens Hald Madsen	1968	V Liberals	Roskilde
Aase Dorthea Madsen	1936	O Danish People's Party	København
Lissa Mathiasen	1948	A Social Democrats	Vejle
Christian Mejdahl	1939	V Liberals	Nordjylland
Arne Melchior	1924	D Centre Democrats	Århus
Anne-Marie Meldgaard	1948	A Social Democrats	Århus
Brian Mikkelsen	1966	C Conservatives	Vestsjælland
Lars Kramer Mikkelsen	1956	A Social Democrats	Østre
Sonja Mikkelsen	1955	A Social Democrats	Århus
Helga Moos	1951	V Liberals	Sønderjylland
Else Marie Mortensen	1946	A Social Democrats	Fyn
Erik Mortensen	1943	A Social Democrats	Nordjylland
Helge Mortensen	1941	A Social Democrats	Ribe
Egil Møller	1941	O Danish People's Party	Frederiksborg
Helge Adam Møller	1942	C Conservatives	Storstrøm
Lone Møller	1949	A Social Democrats	Frederiksborg
Per Stig Møller	1942	C Conservatives	Vestre
Elsebeth Gerner Nielsen	1960	B Social Liberal Party	Vejle
Holger K. Nielsen	1950	F Socialist People's Party	København
Ole Møller Nielsen	1940	Q Christian People's Party	Nordjylland
Poul Nielson	1943	A Social Democrats	Vejle
Karsten Nonbo	1952	V Liberals	Storstrøm
Poul Nødgaard	1936	O Danish People's Party	Århus
Jørn Pedersen	1947	A Social Democrats	Århus
Thor Pedersen	1945	V Liberals	Frederiksborg
Vibeke Peschardt	1939	B Social Liberal Party	Frederiksborg
Jan Petersen	1958	A Social Democrats	Århus
Morten Helveg Petersen	1966	B Social Liberal Party	København
Niels Helveg Petersen	1939	B Social Liberal Party	Fyn
Anders Fogh Rasmussen	1953	V Liberals	Viborg
Ingrid Rasmussen	1947	A Social Democrats	Storstrøm
Lars Løkke Rasmussen	1964	V Liberals	Frederiksborg
Poul Nyrup Rasmussen	1943	A Social Democrats	Ringkøbing
Inge Refshauge	1937	O Danish People's Party	Sønderjylland
Jens Rohde	1970	V Liberals	Viborg
Hans-Pavia Rosing	1948	SI Forward	Greenland
Preben Rudiengaard	1944	V Liberals	Ribe
Karen Rønde	1973	V Liberals	Århus
Pernille Sams	1959	C Conservatives	Århus
Peder Sass	1943	A Social Democrats	Storstrøm
Hans Christian Schmidt	1953	V Liberals	Sønderjylland
Grete Schødts	1945	A Social Democrats	Fyn
Gitte Seeberg	1960	C Conservatives	Roskilde
Hanne Severinsen	1944	V Liberals	Ringkøbing
Ole Løvig Simonsen	1935	A Social Democrats	Storstrøm
Jann Sjursen	1963	Q Christian People's Party	Århus
Birthe Skaarup	1939	O Danish People's Party	Vejle
Peter Skaarup	1964	O Danish People's Party	Østre
Ole Sohn	1954	F Socialist People's Party	Vestsjælland
Ole Stavad	1949	A Social Democrats	Nordjylland
Anni Svanholt	1947	F Socialist People's Party	Århus
Søren Søndergaard	1955	Ø Red-Green Alliance	København
Frode Sørensen	1946	A Social Democrats	Sønderjylland
Hugo Sørensen	1942	A Social Democrats	Århus
Villy Søvndal	1952	F Socialist People's Party	Vejle
Bodil Thrane	1943	V Liberals	Nordjylland
Margot Torp	1944	A Social Democrats	Ribe
Kristen Touborg	1943	F Socialist People's Party	Ringkøbing
Jan Trøjborg	1955	A Social Democrats	Vejle
Ulla Tørnæs	1962	V Liberals	Ribe
Jens Peter Vernersen	1947	A Social Democrats	Ringkøbing
Jens Vibjerg	1949	V Liberals	Vejle
Tove Videbæk	1945	Q Christian People's Party	Ringkøbing
Birte Weiss	1941	A Social Democrats	Søndre
Jørgen Winther	1945	V Liberals	Århus
Jytte Wittrock	1945	A Social Democrats	Storstrøm
Frank Aaen	1951	Ø Red-Green Alliance	Nordjylland

== Party and member changes after the March 1998 elections ==
=== Party changes ===
Below are all parliament members that have joined another party or become independent during the term.

Name	Old party	Constituency	New party	Date
Frank Dahlgaard	C Conservatives	Østre	. Independent	16 June 1999
Frank Dahlgaard	. Independent	Østre	Q Christian People's Party	29 August 2001
Kim Behnke	Z Progress Party	Århus	Fr Freedom 2000	11 October 1999
Kim Behnke	Fr Freedom 2000	Århus	. Independent	6 Februar 2001
Tom Behnke	Z Progress Party	København	Fr Freedom 2000	11 October 1999
Tom Behnke	Fr Freedom 2000	København	C Conservatives	6 Februar 2001
Thorkild Fransgaard	Z Progress Party	Nordjylland	Fr Freedom 2000	11 October 1999
Thorkild Fransgaard	Fr Freedom 2000	Nordjylland	. Independent	6 Februar 2001
Kirsten Jacobsen	Z Progress Party	Nordjylland	Fr Freedom 2000	11 October 1999
Kirsten Jacobsen	Fr Freedom 2000	Nordjylland	. Independent	6 Februar 2001
Inge Refshauge	O Danish People's Party	Sønderjylland	. Independent	21 June 2000
Ole Donner	O Danish People's Party	Nordjylland	. Independent	5 July 2000
Mogens Andreasen	O Danish People's Party	Roskilde	. Independent	24 July 2000
Arne Melchior	D Centre Democrats	Århus	. Independent	28 September 2001

=== Lasting member changes ===
Below are member changes that lasted through the entire term.

Replacement	Birth year	Party	Constituency	Replaced MP	Date	Reason
Susanne Fast Jensen	1951	A Social Democrats	Roskilde	Ove Fich	28 January 1999	Fich resigned his seat.
Kaj Aage Stillinger	1943	F Socialist People's Party	Fyn	Steen Gade	29 May 1999	Gade resigned his seat.
Knud Erik Hansen	1945	F Socialist People's Party	Vestre	Pernille Frahm	20 July 1999	Frahm resigned her seat.
Sandy Brinck	1972	A Social Democrats	Vejle	Poul Nielson	16 September 1999	Nielson resigned his seat.
Gitte Lillelund Bech	1969	V Liberals	København	Bertel Haarder	1 October 1999	Haarder resigned his seat.
Niels Bloch Jespersen	1941	A Social Democrats	Frederiksborg	Susanne Fast Jensen	5 October 1999	Jensen resigned her seat.
Thorstein Theilgaard	1968	F Socialist People's Party	Østre	Christine Antorini	1 December 1999	Antorini resigned her seat.
Inger Marie Bruun-Vierø	1942	B Social Liberal Party	Østre	Jørgen Estrup	1 March 2000	Estrup resigned his seat.
Eva Møller	1940	C Conservatives	Frederiksborg	Hans Engell	17 May 2000	Engell resigned his seat.
John Vinther	1965	C Conservatives	Storstrøm	Jens Heimburger	15 August 2000	Heimburger resigned his seat.
Thomas Adelskov	1964	A Social Democrats	Frederiksborg	Carsten Koch	1 September 2000	Koch resigned his seat.
Henrik Sass Larsen	1966	A Social Democrats	København	Helle Degn	1 October 2000	Degn resigned her seat.
Svend Erik Larsen	1947	A Social Democrats	Vestsjælland	Hans Hækkerup	16 January 2001	Hækkerup resigned his seat.
Ulrik Kragh	1970	V Liberals	Vejle	Anders Mølgaard Jensen	4 February 2001	Jensen passed away.
Lene Garsdal	1947	F Socialist People's Party	Nordjylland	Jes Lunde	1 October 2001	Lunde resigned his seat.

=== Temporary member changes ===
Below are temporary member replacements during the term.

Replacement	Birth year	Party	Constituency	Replaced MP	Start	End	Length
Dorit Myltoft	1943	B Social Liberal Party			31 March 1998	20 November 2001	1,330 days
Anders Samuelsen	1967	B Social Liberal Party	Vejle		31 March 1998	19 November 2001	1,329 days
Henrik Svane	1947	B Social Liberal Party			31 March 1998	31 January 2001	1,037 days
Susanne Fast Jensen	1951	A Social Democrats	Roskilde		14 April 1998	1 June 1998	48 days
Sandy Brinck	1972	A Social Democrats	Vejle		16 April 1998	30 April 1998	14 days
Dora Rossen		O Danish People's Party			16 April 1998	4 June 1998	49 days
Sandy Brinck	1972	A Social Democrats	Vejle		23 June 1998	29 June 1998	6 days
Line Barfod	1964	Ø Red-Green Alliance	Århus		8 October 1998	30 November 1998	53 days
Jytte Madsen	1939	A Social Democrats	Århus	Sonja Mikkelsen	20 October 1998	27 October 1998	7 days
Knud Enggaard	1929	V Liberals			27 October 1998	13 November 1998	17 days
Mogens Nørgaard Pedersen	1957	Q Christian People's Party			27 October 1998	20 November 1998	24 days
Bjarne Petersen		A Social Democrats			27 October 1998	20 November 1998	24 days
Bjørn Westh	1944	A Social Democrats	Viborg	Anna-Marie Hansen	27 October 1998	20 November 1998	24 days
Susanne Fast Jensen	1951	A Social Democrats	Roskilde	Helen Beim	27 October 1998	20 November 1998	24 days
Bent Greve	1953	A Social Democrats			29 October 1998	6 November 1998	8 days
Frederik Nørgaard	1940	A Social Democrats	Fyn	Else Marie Mortensen	3 November 1998	1 January 1999	59 days
Thomas Adelskov	1964	A Social Democrats	Vestsjællands		17 November 1998	24 November 1998	7 days
Michael Gammelgaard		A Social Democrats			1 December 1998	11 January 1999	41 days
Niels Bloch Jespersen	1941	A Social Democrats	Frederiksborg	Helen Beim	1 December 1998	7 December 1998	6 days
Frederik Nørgaard	1940	A Social Democrats	Fyn	Grete Schødts	12 January 1999	5 March 1999	52 days
Henrik Sass Larsen	1966	A Social Democrats	København		19 January 1999	21 March 1999	61 days
John Vinther	1965	C Conservatives	Storstrøm		19 January 1999	14 September 1999	238 days
Merete Behrndt	1947	Z Progress Party	København	Tom Behnke	26 January 1999	5 February 1999	10 days
Gunhild Husum	1943	B Social Liberal Party	Århus	Elisabeth Arnold	26 January 1999	1 February 1999	6 days
Tom Beck		C Conservatives			2 February 1999	28 May 1999	115 days
Christian Jensen		Z Progress Party			4 February 1999	12 February 1999	8 days
Christian Jensen		Z Progress Party			25 February 1999	28 May 1999	92 days
Malene Vestergård		F Socialist People's Party			2 March 1999	29 April 1999	58 days
Ulrik Kragh	1970	V Liberals	Vejle		16 March 1999	7 May 1999	52 days
Frederik Nørgaard	1940	A Social Democrats	Fyn	Else Marie Mortensen	16 March 1999	12 April 1999	27 days
Sandy Brinck	1972	A Social Democrats	Vejle		18 March 1999	26 March 1999	8 days
Christel Schaldemose	1967	A Social Democrats			6 April 1999	12 April 1999	6 days
Henning Urup	1953	V Liberals	Ribe	Ulla Tørnæs	6 April 1999	27 May 1999	51 days
Jytte Madsen	1939	A Social Democrats	Århus	Anne-Marie Meldgaard	6 April 1999	28 May 1999	52 days
Niels Rasmussen		A Social Democrats			9 April 1999	16 April 1999	7 days
Peter Christensen	1958	A Social Democrats			13 April 1999	26 April 1999	13 days
Sandy Brinck	1972	A Social Democrats	Vejle		15 April 1999	23 April 1999	8 days
Thomas Adelskov	1964	A Social Democrats	Vestsjællands		20 April 1999	6 May 1999	16 days
Pernille Rosenkrantz-Theil	1977	Ø Red-Green Alliance	Østre		20 April 1999	31 July 1999	102 days
Børge Klit Johansen		Q Christian People's Party			27 April 1999	3 May 1999	6 days
Søren Nedbo		A Social Democrats			4 May 1999	11 May 1999	7 days
Henrik Sass Larsen	1966	A Social Democrats	København		16 June 1999	22 June 1999	6 days
Jytte Madsen	1939	A Social Democrats	Århus	Anne-Marie Meldgaard	16 June 1999	24 June 1999	8 days
Christen Amby	1945	F Socialist People's Party			7 October 1999	15 October 1999	8 days
Børge Klit Johansen		Q Christian People's Party			7 October 1999	15 October 1999	8 days
Erling Oxdam	1932	V Liberals	Vestre	Rikke Hvilshøj	7 October 1999	8 December 1999	62 days
Jytte Madsen	1939	A Social Democrats	Århus	Hans Peter Baadsgaard	7 October 1999	14 October 1999	7 days
Søren Gade	1963	V Liberals	Ringkøbing		12 October 1999	5 November 1999	24 days
Jesper Kiel	1966	Ø Red-Green Alliance	Fyn	Søren Kolstrup	25 October 1999	18 November 1999	24 days
Poul Qvist Jørgensen	1941	A Social Democrats	Sønderjylland		26 October 1999	18 November 1999	23 days
Svend Erik Larsen		A Social Democrats			26 October 1999	18 November 1999	23 days
Carsten Aagaard		O Danish People's Party			26 October 1999	18 November 1999	23 days
Niels Rasmussen		A Social Democrats			28 October 1999	4 November 1999	7 days
Inga-Britt Olsen		F Socialist People's Party			30 November 1999	10 December 1999	10 days
Jytte Madsen	1939	A Social Democrats	Århus	Svend Auken	30 November 1999	6 December 1999	6 days
Jytte Madsen	1939	A Social Democrats	Århus	Sonja Mikkelsen	7 December 1999	13 December 1999	6 days
Ulrik Kragh	1970	V Liberals	Vejle		13 January 2000	27 March 2000	74 days
Lars Christian Lilleholt	1965	V Liberals	Fyn		18 January 2000	10 February 2000	23 days
Gunhild Husum	1943	B Social Liberal Party	Århus	Elisabeth Arnold	25 January 2000	31 January 2000	6 days
Børge Klit Johansen		Q Christian People's Party			25 January 2000	31 January 2000	6 days
Kurt Christiansen		O Danish People's Party			1 February 2000	11 February 2000	10 days
Thomas Adelskov	1964	A Social Democrats	Vestsjælland		14 March 2000	30 March 2000	16 days
Lisbeth Arbøl		D Centre Democrats			14 March 2000	20 March 2000	6 days
Knud Wilson		O Danish People's Party			15 March 2000	22 March 2000	7 days
Tove Bjerre Mortensen		V Liberals			28 March 2000	8 May 2000	41 days
Pernille Falcon		Ø Red-Green Alliance			4 April 2000	11 April 2000	7 days
Børge Klit Johansen		Q Christian People's Party			4 April 2000	11 April 2000	7 days
Niels Rasmussen		A Social Democrats			4 April 2000	14 April 2000	10 days
Arne Kirkelund		O Danish People's Party			2 May 2000	14 May 2000	12 days
Helle Christensen		A Social Democrats			3 October 2000	27 October 2000	24 days
Jens Ove Kjeldsen		Q Christian People's Party			3 October 2000	27 October 2000	24 days
Inga-Britt Olsen		F Socialist People's Party			3 October 2000	27 October 2000	24 days
Lone Yalcinkaya		D Centre Democrats			5 October 2000	31 December 2000	87 days
Thomas Christfort		C Conservatives			31 October 2000	24 November 2000	24 days
Knud Enggaard		V Liberals			31 October 2000	23 November 2000	23 days
Michael Gammelgaard		A Social Democrats			31 October 2000	24 November 2000	24 days
Helge Bo Jensen		Ø Red-Green Alliance			31 October 2000	24 November 2000	24 days
Lone Saaby Johansen		B Social Liberal Party			31 October 2000	24 November 2000	24 days
Annette Jørgensen		O Danish People's Party			31 October 2000	15 December 2000	45 days
Frederik Nørgaard	1940	A Social Democrats	Fyn	Else Marie Mortensen	31 October 2000	18 February 2001	110 days
Jens Lars Fleischer		A Social Democrats			2 November 2000	24 November 2000	22 days
Knud Enggaard		V Liberals			24 November 2000	25 May 2001	182 days
Gunhild Husum	1943	B Social Liberal Party	Århus	Elisabeth Arnold	23 January 2001	29 January 2001	6 days
Helge Bo Jensen		Ø Red-Green Alliance			23 January 2001	29 January 2001	6 days
Børge Klit Johansen		Q Christian People's Party			23 January 2001	29 January 2001	6 days
Marianne Stentebjerg		B Social Liberal Party			1 February 2001	20 November 2001	292 days
Erling Oxdam	1932	V Liberals	Vestre	Rikke Hvilshøj	6 February 2001	29 May 2001	112 days
Egon Pleidrup Poulsen		A Social Democrats			20 March 2001	6 April 2001	17 days
Niels Rasmussen		A Social Democrats			22 March 2001	6 April 2001	15 days
Frederik Nørgaard	1940	A Social Democrats	Fyn	Lotte Bundsgaard	29 March 2001	6 April 2001	8 days
Helge Bo Jensen		Ø Red-Green Alliance			30 March 2001	6 April 2001	7 days
Børge Klit Johansen		Q Christian People's Party			30 March 2001	6 April 2001	7 days
Bjørn Westh	1944	A Social Democrats	Viborg		17 April 2001	27 April 2001	10 days
Helge Bo Jensen		Ø Red-Green Alliance			19 April 2001	27 April 2001	8 days
Børge Klit Johansen		Q Christian People's Party			23 April 2001	29 April 2001	6 days
Frederik Nørgaard	1940	A Social Democrats	Fyn	Poul Andersen	23 October 2001	31 October 2001	8 days
