= List of members of the Folketing, 1990–1994 =

62nd Folketing
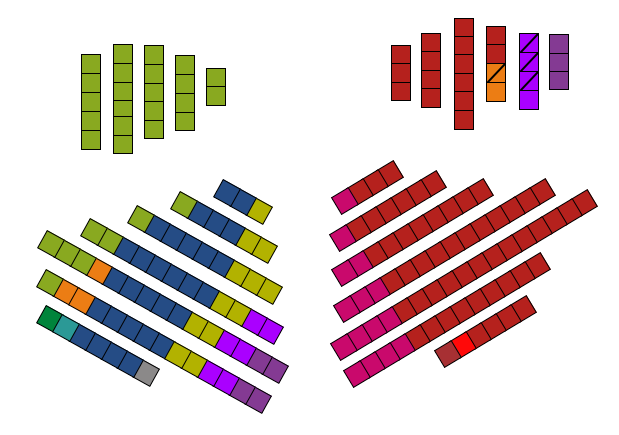
- Term: 12 December 1990 - 21 September 1994
- Speaker: C H. P. Clausen (until 1993); A Henning Rasmussen (from 1993)
- Prime Minister: C Poul Schlüter (until 1993); A Poul Nyrup Rasmussen (from 1993)
- Cabinet: Schlüter IV; Nyrup Rasmussen I
- Previous: 1988-1990
- Next: 1994-1998

This is a list of the 179 members of the Folketing, in the 1990 to 1994 session. They were elected at the 1990 general election.

== Election results ==
Denmark
Party	Votes	%	Seats	+/–
Social Democratic Party	1,211,121	37.4	69	+14
Conservative People's Party	517,293	16.0	30	–5
Venstre	511,643	15.8	29	+7
Socialist People's Party	268,759	8.3	15	–9
Progress Party	208,484	6.4	12	–4
Centre Democrats	165,556	5.1	9	0
Danish Social Liberal Party	114,888	3.5	7	–3
Christian People's Party	74,174	2.3	4	0
Common Course	57,896	1.8	0	0
Red-Green Alliance	54,038	1.7	0	New
De Grønne	27,642	0.9	0	0
Justice Party of Denmark	17,181	0.5	0	New
Humanist Party	763	0.0	0	New
Independents	10,224	0.3	0	0
Invalid/blank votes	25,758	–	–	–
Total	3,265,420	100	175	0
Faroe Islands
Social Democratic Party	4,835	27.0	1	+1
People's Party	4,582	25.6	1	0
Union Party	4,558	25.5	0	–1
Republican Party	2,377	13.3	0	0
Self-Government Party	1,240	6.9	0	0
Christian People's Party	285	1.6	0	0
Invalid/blank votes	79	–	–	–
Total	17,956	100	2	0
Greenland
Siumut	8,272	42.8	1	0
Atassut	7,078	36.6	1	0
Inuit Ataqatigiit	3,281	17.0	0	0
Polar Party	366	1.9	0	0
Independents	333	1.7	0	New
Invalid/blank votes	741	–	–	–
Total	20,080	100	2	0
Source: Nohlen & Stöver

== Seat distribution ==
Below is the distribution of the 179 seats as it appeared after the 1990 election, as well at the distribution at the end of the term.

Party	Party leader	Elected seats	End seats	Change
A Social Democrats	Poul Nyrup Rasmussen	69	69	Steady
B Social Liberal Party	Marianne Jelved	7	7	Steady
C Conservatives	Hans Engell	30	30	Steady
D Centre Democrats	Mimi Jakobsen	9	7	▼2
F Socialist People's Party	Holger K. Nielsen	15	15	Steady
Q Christian People's Party	Jann Sjursen	4	4	Steady
V Liberals	Uffe Ellemann-Jensen	29	30	▲1
Z Progress Party	Pia Kjærsgaard	12	12	Steady
FF People's Party	Anfinn Kallsberg	1	1	Steady
JF Social Democratic Party	Marita Petersen	1	1	Steady
AT Feeling of Community	Daniel Skifte	1	1	Steady
SI Forward	Lars-Emil Johansen	1	1	Steady
. Outside group		-	1	▲1

== Parliament members elected at the December 1990 election ==
Name	Birth year	Party	Constituency
Niels Ahlmann-Olsen	1953	C Conservatives	Nordjylland
Sonja Albrink	1948	D Centre Democrats	Vejle
Else Winther Andersen	1941	V Liberals	Århus
Hanne Andersen	1939	A Social Democrats	København
Henning Andersen	1931	C Conservatives	Fyn
Jytte Andersen	1942	A Social Democrats	Østre
Poul Andersen	1952	A Social Democrats	Fyn
Charlotte Antonsen	1959	V Liberals	Frederiksborg
Elisabeth Arnold	1941	B Social Liberal Party	Århus
Svend Auken	1943	A Social Democrats	Århus
Kai Dige Bach	1936	C Conservatives	København
Børge Bakholt	1935	A Social Democrats	Fyn
Kim Behnke	1960	Z Progress Party	Århus
Tom Behnke	1966	Z Progress Party	København
Helen Beim	1943	A Social Democrats	Roskilde
Dorte Bennedsen	1938	A Social Democrats	København
Jens Bilgrav-Nielsen	1936	B Social Liberal Party	Vejle
Ritt Bjerregaard	1941	A Social Democrats	Fyn
Mariann Fischer Boel	1943	V Liberals	Fyn
Óli Breckmann	1948	FF People's Party	Faroe Islands
Peter Brixtofte	1949	V Liberals	Fyn
Aage Brusgaard	1947	Z Progress Party	Viborg
Hans Peter Baadsgaard	1937	A Social Democrats	Århus
Erling Christensen	1942	A Social Democrats	Fyn
Frode Nør Christensen	1948	D Centre Democrats	Ringkøbing
Henning Lysholm Christensen	1941	Q Christian People's Party	Ringkøbing
Jan Køpke Christensen	1955	Z Progress Party	Sønderjylland
Ole Vagn Christensen	1943	A Social Democrats	Viborg
Pia Christmas-Møller	1961	C Conservatives	København
Hans Peter Clausen	1928	C Conservatives	Nordjylland
Inge Dahl-Sørensen	1947	V Liberals	Østre
Atli Dam	1932	JF Social Democratic Party	Faroe Islands
Helle Degn	1946	A Social Democrats	København
Tommy Dinesen	1939	F Socialist People's Party	Vestsjælland
Ole Adolf Donner	1939	Z Progress Party	Frederiksborg
Peter Duetoft	1950	D Centre Democrats	Nordjylland
Lone Dybkjær	1940	B Social Liberal Party	København
Henning Dyremose	1945	C Conservatives	København
Poul Erik Dyrlund	1949	A Social Democrats	Vestsjælland
Uffe Ellemann-Jensen	1941	V Liberals	Århus
Hans Engell	1948	C Conservatives	Frederiksborg
Knud Enggaard	1929	V Liberals	Århus
Hans Ejlert Erenbjerg	1931	A Social Democrats	Storstrøm
Ole Espersen	1934	A Social Democrats	Østre
Jørgen Estrup	1942	B Social Liberal Party	Østre
Eva Fatum	1947	A Social Democrats	Bornholm
Ove Fich	1949	A Social Democrats	Roskilde
Viggo Fischer	1943	C Conservatives	Roskilde
Pernille Forchhammer	1967	A Social Democrats	Århus
Pernille Frahm	1954	F Socialist People's Party	København
Steen Gade	1945	F Socialist People's Party	Ringkøbing
Lars Peter Gammelgaard	1945	C Conservatives	Århus
Henning Gjellerod	1940	A Social Democrats	Ringkøbing
Pia Gjellerup	1959	A Social Democrats	Vestre
Martin Glerup	1943	A Social Democrats	Nordjylland
Knud Glønborg	1930	Q Christian People's Party	Nordjylland
Holger Graversen	1936	A Social Democrats	Nordjylland
Henning Grove	1932	C Conservatives	Viborg
Lilli Gyldenkilde	1936	F Socialist People's Party	Vejle
Peter Hansen-Nord	1947	V Liberals	Vestsjælland
Anna-Marie Hansen	1943	A Social Democrats	Viborg
Birthe Hansen	1930	F Socialist People's Party	Storstrøm
Eva Kjer Hansen	1964	V Liberals	Vejle
Flemming Hansen	1939	C Conservatives	Vejle
Ivar Hansen	1938	V Liberals	Ribe
Jens Kristian Hansen	1926	A Social Democrats	Sønderjylland
Søren Hansen	1942	A Social Democrats	Vestsjælland
Svend Heiselberg	1935	V Liberals	Viborg
Lotte Henriksen	1963	A Social Democrats	Frederiksborg
Jytte Hilden	1942	A Social Democrats	Vestsjælland
Karl Hjortnæs	1934	A Social Democrats	Århus
Lis Noer Holmberg	1930	D Centre Democrats	Fyn
Birthe Rønn Hornbech	1943	V Liberals	Roskilde
Svend Erik Hovmand	1945	V Liberals	Storstrøm
Birgitte Husmark	1945	F Socialist People's Party	Frederiksborg
Hans Hækkerup	1945	A Social Democrats	Vestsjælland
Klaus Hækkerup	1943	A Social Democrats	Frederiksborg
Lise Hækkerup	1947	A Social Democrats	Østre
Niels Jørn Højland	1954	Z Progress Party	Ringkøbing
Bertel Haarder	1944	V Liberals	København
Kaj Ikast	1935	C Conservatives	Sønderjylland
Hanne Thanning Jacobsen	1936	F Socialist People's Party	Fyn
Kirsten Jacobsen	1942	Z Progress Party	Nordjylland
Erhard Jacobsen	1917	D Centre Democrats	Frederiksborg
Mimi Jakobsen	1948	D Centre Democrats	København
Marianne Jelved	1943	B Social Liberal Party	Nordjylland
Svend Aage Jensby	1940	V Liberals	Nordjylland
Anders Mølgaard Jensen	1958	V Liberals	Vejle
Arne Jensen	1938	A Social Democrats	Nordjylland
Filt Jensen	1926	V Liberals	Sønderjylland
Frank Jensen	1961	A Social Democrats	Nordjylland
Hans Jørgen Jensen	1929	A Social Democrats	København
Karen Højte Jensen	1938	C Conservatives	Roskilde
Ole Vig Jensen	1936	B Social Liberal Party	Vestsjælland
Karen Jespersen	1947	V Liberals	København
Bente Juncker	1944	D Centre Democrats	Østre
Annette Just	1947	Z Progress Party	Vejle
Anker Jørgensen	1922	A Social Democrats	Vestre
Helen Jørgensen	1944	A Social Democrats	Vejle
Jens Jørgensen	1942	C Conservatives	Vestsjælland
Poul Qvist Jørgensen	1941	A Social Democrats	Sønderjylland
Kent Kirk	1948	C Conservatives	Ribe
Knud Erik Kirkegaard	1942	C Conservatives	Ringkøbing
Pia Kjærsgaard	1947	Z Progress Party	Fyn
Jens Risgaard Knudsen	1925	A Social Democrats	Nordjylland
Flemming Kofod-Svendsen	1944	Q Christian People's Party	København
Niels Anker Kofoed	1929	V Liberals	Bornholm
Henrik Dam Kristensen	1957	A Social Democrats	Ribe
Erik Larsen	1944	V Liberals	Fyn
Pia Larsen	1956	V Liberals	Københavns
Tove Lindbo Larsen	1928	A Social Democrats	Søndre
Agnete Laustsen	1935	C Conservatives	Søndre
Torben Lund	1950	A Social Democrats	Vejle
Jes Lunde	1956	F Socialist People's Party	Nordjylland
Anne Birgitte Lundholt	1952	C Conservatives	Ringkøbing
Mogens Lykketoft	1946	A Social Democrats	København
Kirsten Madsen	1936	Z Progress Party	Østre
Lissa Mathiasen	1948	A Social Democrats	Vejle
Christian Mejdahl	1939	V Liberals	Nordjylland
Arne Melchior	1924	D Centre Democrats	Århus
Anne-Marie Meldgaard	1948	A Social Democrats	Århus
Sonja Mikkelsen	1955	A Social Democrats	Århus
Else Marie Mortensen	1946	A Social Democrats	Fyn
Helge Mortensen	1941	A Social Democrats	Ribe
Eva Møller	1940	C Conservatives	Frederiksborg
Grethe Fenger Møller	1941	C Conservatives	Østre
Helge Adam Møller	1942	C Conservatives	Storstrøm
Kjeld Rahbæk Møller	1938	F Socialist People's Party	Søndre
Lone Møller	1949	A Social Democrats	Frederiksborg
Per Stig Møller	1942	C Conservatives	Vestre
Henning Nielsen	1932	A Social Democrats	Ringkøbing
Holger K. Nielsen	1950	F Socialist People's Party	København
Poul Nielson	1943	A Social Democrats	Vejle
Erik Ninn-Hansen	1922	C Conservatives	Fyn
Poul Nødgaard	1936	Z Progress Party	Vestsjælland
Ivar Nørgaard	1922	A Social Democrats	København
Erling Olsen	1927	A Social Democrats	Østre
Inger Stilling Pedersen	1929	Q Christian People's Party	Århus
Jørn Pedersen	1947	A Social Democrats	Århus
Thor Pedersen	1945	V Liberals	Frederiksborg
Gert Petersen	1927	F Socialist People's Party	Østre
Jan Petersen	1958	A Social Democrats	Århus
Niels Helveg Petersen	1939	B Social Liberal Party	Fyn
Jette Pors	1941	D Centre Democrats	Roskilde
Kaj Poulsen	1945	A Social Democrats	Nordjylland
Anders Fogh Rasmussen	1953	V Liberals	Viborg
Henning Rasmussen	1926	A Social Democrats	Ribe
Ingrid Rasmussen	1947	A Social Democrats	Storstrøm
Poul Nyrup Rasmussen	1943	A Social Democrats	Ringkøbing
Torben Rechendorff	1937	C Conservatives	Vestsjælland
Søren Riishøj	1947	F Socialist People's Party	Roskilde
Hans-Pavia Rosing	1948	SI Forward	Greenland
Jens Peter Rønholt	1939	C Conservatives	Sønderjylland
Pernille Sams	1959	C Conservatives	Århus
Helge Sander	1950	V Liberals	Ringkøbing
Peder Sass	1943	A Social Democrats	Storstrøm
Poul Schlüter	1929	V Liberals	København
Ernst Bundgaard Schmidt	1924	Z Progress Party	Ribe
Grete Schødts	1945	A Social Democrats	Fyn
Hanne Severinsen	1944	V Liberals	Ringkøbing
Ole Løvig Simonsen	1935	A Social Democrats	Storstrøm
Erik Brünnich Smith	1939	A Social Democrats	Frederiksborg
Jimmy Stahr	1935	A Social Democrats	Roskilde
Ole Stavad	1949	A Social Democrats	Nordjylland
Otto Steenholdt	1936	AT Feeling of Community	Greenland
Ebba Strange	1929	F Socialist People's Party	Århus
Peder Sønderby	1932	V Liberals	Sønderjylland
Jens Thoft	1945	F Socialist People's Party	Århus
Bodil Thrane	1943	V Liberals	Nordjylland
Jan Trøjborg	1955	A Social Democrats	Vejle
Per Tærsbøl	1940	C Conservatives	Frederiksborg
Laurits Tørnæs	1936	V Liberals	Ribe
Svend Taanquist	1930	A Social Democrats	Sønderjylland
John Vinther	1965	C Conservatives	København
Pelle Voigt	1950	F Socialist People's Party	Vestre
Birte Weiss	1941	A Social Democrats	Søndre
Bjørn Westh	1944	A Social Democrats	Viborg
Jørgen Winther	1945	V Liberals	Århus
Christian Aagaard	1937	C Conservatives	Århus

== Party and member changes after the December 1990 elections ==
=== Party changes ===
Below are all parliament members that have joined another party or become independent during the term.

Name	Old party	Constituency	New party	Date
Hans Ejlert Erenbjerg	A Social Democrats	Storstrøm	. Independent	9 December 1992
Hans Ejlert Erenbjerg	. Independent	Storstrøm	A Social Democrats	9 February 1993
Lis Noer Holmberg	D Centre Democrats	Fyn	. Independent	21 January 1993
Lis Noer Holmberg	. Independent	Fyn	V Liberals	27 January 1993
Bente Juncker	D Centre Democrats	Østre	. Independent	28 February 1994

=== Lasting member changes ===
Below are member changes that lasted through the entire term.

Replacement	Birth year	Party	Constituency	Replaced MP	Date	Reason
Svend Aage Jensen	1930	D Centre Democrats	Ringkøbing	Frode Nør Christensen	3 October 1991	Christensen resigned his seat.
Bjarne Laustsen	1953	A Social Democrats	Nordjylland	Arne Jensen	11 November 1992	Jensen passed away.
Dorit Myltoft Andersen	1943	B Social Liberal Party	Fyn	Niels Helveg Petersen	2 February 1993	Petersen resigned his seat.
Vibeke Grønbæk	1960	B Social Liberal Party	Vestsjælland	Ole Vig Jensen	2 February 1993	Jensen resigned his seat.
Merethe Due Jensen	1943	Q Christian People's Party	København	Flemming Kofod-Svendsen	2 February 1993	Kofod-Svendsen resigned his seat.
Hans Larsen-Ledet	1921	B Social Liberal Party	Nordjylland	Marianne Jelved	2 February 1993	Jelved resigned her seat.
Ilse Hansen	1954	A Social Democrats	Nordjylland	Kaj Poulsen	30 March 1993	Poulsen resigned his seat.
Ole Møller Nielsen	1940	Q Christian People's Party	Nordjylland	Knud Glønborg	10 September 1993	Glønborg resigned his seat.
Ole Bernt Henriksen	1934	C Conservatives	Århus	Lars Peter Gammelgaard	12 February 1994	Gammelgaard passed away.
Villy Søvndal	1952	F Socialist People's Party	Vejle	Lilli Gyldenkilde	1 August 1994	Gyldenkilde resigned her seat.

=== Temporary member changes ===
Below are temporary member replacements during the term.

Replacement	Birth year	Party	Constituency	Replaced MP	Start	End	Length
Jacob Lindenskov	1933	JF Social Democratic Party	Faroe Islands	Atli Dam	28 December 1990	18 January 1993	752 days
Addi Andersen	1928	D Centre Democrats			22 January 1991	28 January 1991	6 days
Svend Aage Jensen	1930	D Centre Democrats	Ringkøbing		31 January 1991	6 February 1991	6 days
Addi Andersen	1928	D Centre Democrats			19 February 1991	25 February 1991	6 days
Svend Aage Jensen	1930	D Centre Democrats	Ringkøbing		19 February 1991	25 February 1991	6 days
Svend Aage Jensen	1930	D Centre Democrats	Ringkøbing		5 March 1991	24 March 1991	19 days
Addi Andersen	1928	D Centre Democrats			12 March 1991	18 March 1991	6 days
Bente Grønfeldt		V Liberals			4 April 1991	31 May 1991	57 days
Addi Andersen	1928	D Centre Democrats			16 April 1991	22 April 1991	6 days
Svend Aage Jensen	1930	D Centre Democrats	Ringkøbing		16 April 1991	22 April 1991	6 days
Bodil Melgaard Haakonsen		D Centre Democrats			7 May 1991	13 May 1991	6 days
Svend Aage Jensen	1930	D Centre Democrats	Ringkøbing		7 May 1991	2 June 1991	26 days
Addi Andersen	1928	D Centre Democrats			14 May 1991	20 May 1991	6 days
Annebeth Runge Svendsen		V Liberals			14 May 1991	31 May 1991	17 days
Alex Hilton		V Liberals			28 May 1991	3 June 1991	6 days
Karen From		V Liberals			3 October 1991	26 October 1991	23 days
Jens Heimburger	1965	C Conservatives	Storstrøm	Helge Adam Møller	3 October 1991	27 October 1991	24 days
Jørgen Kvist Jensen		Q Christian People's Party			3 October 1991	27 October 1991	24 days
Steffen Kjærulff-Schmidt		Z Progress Party			3 October 1991	14 October 1991	11 days
Claus Larsen-Jensen	1953	A Social Democrats	Østre		3 October 1991	28 October 1991	25 days
Finn Larsen		D Centre Democrats			3 October 1991	28 October 1991	25 days
Jørgen Lenger		F Socialist People's Party			3 October 1991	26 October 1991	23 days
Villy Søvndal	1952	F Socialist People's Party	Vejle	Lilli Gyldenkilde	10 October 1991	13 January 1992	95 days
Bo Friis		C Conservatives			19 October 1991	1 December 1991	43 days
Addi Andersen	1928	D Centre Democrats			22 October 1991	28 October 1991	6 days
Bente Grønfeldt		V Liberals			22 October 1991	20 December 1991	59 days
Arqalo Abelsen		AT Feeling of Community	Greenland	Otto Steenholdt	29 October 1991	1 December 1991	33 days
Vibeke Grønbæk	1960	B Social Liberal Party	Vestsjælland	Ole Vig Jensen	29 October 1991	1 December 1991	33 days
Anders Laubjerg		F Socialist People's Party			29 October 1991	1 December 1991	33 days
Michael Kock		Z Progress Party			29 October 1991	2 December 1991	34 days
Finn Lynge	1933	SI Forward	Greenland	Hans-Pavia Rosing	29 October 1991	2 December 1991	34 days
Annebeth Runge Svendsen		V Liberals			3 December 1991	19 December 1991	16 days
Addi Andersen	1928	D Centre Democrats			10 December 1991	16 December 1991	6 days
Alex Hilton		V Liberals			11 December 1991	17 December 1991	6 days
Hans Jørgen Andersen		Z Progress Party			19 December 1991	25 December 1991	6 days
Addi Andersen	1928	D Centre Democrats			14 January 1992	20 January 1992	6 days
Julie Andersen		D Centre Democrats			4 February 1992	10 February 1992	6 days
Addi Andersen	1928	D Centre Democrats			10 March 1992	16 March 1992	6 days
Bente Grønfeldt		V Liberals			10 March 1992	17 May 1992	68 days
Peter Christian Christensen	1939	A Social Democrats	Århus	Sonja Mikkelsen	21 April 1992	4 October 1992	166 days
Addi Andersen	1928	D Centre Democrats			12 May 1992	18 May 1992	6 days
Charlotte Enevoldsen		D Centre Democrats			15 June 1992	21 June 1992	6 days
Bente Grønfeldt		V Liberals			15 June 1992	21 June 1992	6 days
Peter Christian Christensen	1939	A Social Democrats	Århus	Pernille Forchhammer	8 October 1992	14 April 1993	188 days
Anne-Lise Frølich		B Social Liberal Party			8 October 1992	16 October 1992	8 days
Vibeke Storm Rasmussen		A Social Democrats			20 October 1992	13 December 1992	54 days
Addi Andersen	1928	D Centre Democrats			27 October 1992	2 November 1992	6 days
Bente Grønfeldt		V Liberals			27 October 1992	20 December 1992	54 days
Charlotte Enevoldsen		D Centre Democrats			3 November 1992	19 November 1992	16 days
Christian Wedell-Neergaard	1956	C Conservatives	Roskilde		3 November 1992	29 November 1992	26 days
Aage Frandsen		F Socialist People's Party			3 November 1992	30 November 1992	27 days
Jens Peter Jensen		V Liberals			3 November 1992	30 November 1992	27 days
Ole Møller Nielsen	1940	Q Christian People's Party	Nordjylland		3 November 1992	30 November 1992	27 days
Evald Zacho		A Social Democrats			3 November 1992	30 November 1992	27 days
Addi Andersen	1928	D Centre Democrats			17 November 1992	23 November 1992	6 days
Annebeth Runge Svendsen		V Liberals			14 December 1992	20 December 1992	6 days
Hugo Sørensen		A Social Democrats			14 December 1992	29 January 1993	46 days
Addi Andersen	1928	D Centre Democrats			15 December 1992	21 December 1992	6 days
Sven B. Nielsen		V Liberals			17 December 1992	23 December 1992	6 days
Bente Grønfeldt		V Liberals			14 January 1993	22 January 1993	8 days
Aage Frandsen		F Socialist People's Party			2 February 1993	29 March 1993	55 days
Hugo Sørensen		A Social Democrats			8 February 1993	29 March 1993	49 days
Addi Andersen	1928	D Centre Democrats			9 February 1993	15 February 1993	6 days
Addi Andersen	1928	D Centre Democrats			9 March 1993	15 March 1993	6 days
Brian Mikkelsen	1966	C Conservatives	Vestsjælland		11 March 1993	18 April 1993	38 days
Charlotte Enevoldsen		D Centre Democrats			23 March 1993	29 March 1993	6 days
Ole Bernt Henriksen	1934	C Conservatives	Århus		23 March 1993	1 April 1993	9 days
Frederik Nørgaard	1940	A Social Democrats	Fyn	Erling Christensen	23 March 1993	2 April 1993	10 days
Lis Greibe		A Social Democrats			30 March 1993	5 April 1993	6 days
Vibeke Storm Rasmussen		A Social Democrats			30 March 1993	5 April 1993	6 days
Evald Zacho		A Social Democrats			30 March 1993	5 April 1993	6 days
Aage Frandsen		F Socialist People's Party			1 April 1993	28 April 1993	27 days
Erling Hugger Jakobsen		A Social Democrats			13 April 1993	19 April 1993	6 days
Charlotte Enevoldsen		D Centre Democrats			20 April 1993	26 April 1993	6 days
Ebbe Lundgaard	1944	B Social Liberal Party	Vestsjælland	Vibeke Grønbæk	20 April 1993	30 September 1993	163 days
Thomas Thors		A Social Democrats			20 April 1993	30 September 1993	163 days
Addi Andersen	1928	D Centre Democrats			25 May 1993	31 May 1993	6 days
Frederik Nørgaard	1940	A Social Democrats	Fyn	Poul Andersen	25 May 1993	31 May 1993	6 days
Claus Larsen-Jensen	1953	A Social Democrats	Østre		26 May 1993	1 June 1993	6 days
Inger Garre		V Liberals			1 June 1993	7 June 1993	6 days
Erling Hugger Jakobsen		A Social Democrats			3 June 1993	9 June 1993	6 days
Asger Jensen		A Social Democrats			8 June 1993	16 June 1993	8 days
Bjarne Petersen		A Social Democrats			8 June 1993	16 June 1993	8 days
Claus Larsen-Jensen	1953	A Social Democrats	Østre		9 June 1993	24 June 1993	15 days
Inger Marie Bruun-Vierø	1942	B Social Liberal Party	Østre	Jørgen Estrup	14 June 1993	20 June 1993	6 days
Frederik Nørgaard	1940	A Social Democrats	Fyn		15 June 1993	21 June 1993	6 days
Tove Videbæk		Q Christian People's Party			15 June 1993	21 June 1993	6 days
Svend-Aage Laxager		A Social Democrats			15 June 1993	23 June 1993	8 days
Jacob Buksti		A Social Democrats			15 June 1993	25 June 1993	10 days
Bent Greve		A Social Democrats			15 June 1993	25 June 1993	10 days
Steffen Kjærulff-Schmidt		Z Progress Party			15 June 1993	25 June 1993	10 days
Aage Frandsen		F Socialist People's Party			15 June 1993	26 June 1993	11 days
Vibeke Storm Rasmussen		A Social Democrats			15 June 1993	27 June 1993	12 days
Arne Nielsen		Q Christian People's Party			21 June 1993	27 June 1993	6 days
Bent A. Rasmussen		A Social Democrats			21 June 1993	27 June 1993	6 days
Peter Christian Christensen	1939	A Social Democrats	Århus	Svend Auken	21 June 1993	29 June 1993	8 days
Addi Andersen	1928	D Centre Democrats			22 June 1993	28 June 1993	6 days
Bodil Tang Kristensen		Q Christian People's Party			7 October 1993	14 October 1993	7 days
Kristian Thulesen Dahl	1969	Z Progress Party	Vejle		7 October 1993	24 October 1993	17 days
Bjarne Ørum		B Social Liberal Party			7 October 1993	24 October 1993	17 days
Karen From		V Liberals			7 October 1993	25 October 1993	18 days
Finn Lynge	1933	SI Forward	Greenland	Hans-Pavia Rosing	7 October 1993	25 October 1993	18 days
Bjarne Petersen		A Social Democrats			7 October 1993	25 October 1993	18 days
Kristen Touborg	1943	F Socialist People's Party	Ringkøbing		7 October 1993	26 October 1993	19 days
Addi Andersen	1928	D Centre Democrats			26 October 1993	1 November 1993	6 days
Claus Larsen-Jensen	1953	A Social Democrats	Østre		28 October 1993	4 November 1993	7 days
Jørn Jespersen	1955	F Socialist People's Party	Storstrøm	Pernille Frahm	29 October 1993	28 November 1993	30 days
Mario See		D Centre Democrats	CONS		30 October 1993	29 November 1993	30 days
Tove Videbæk		Q Christian People's Party			30 October 1993	28 November 1993	29 days
Gerda Thymann Pedersen		C Conservatives			2 November 1993	28 November 1993	26 days
Kirsten Kimø		V Liberals			2 November 1993	29 November 1993	27 days
Vibeke Storm Rasmussen		A Social Democrats			2 November 1993	29 November 1993	27 days
Addi Andersen	1928	D Centre Democrats			4 November 1993	10 January 1994	67 days
Bent Bundgaard		B Social Liberal Party			23 November 1993	6 December 1993	13 days
Claus Larsen-Jensen	1953	A Social Democrats	Østre		30 November 1993	6 December 1993	6 days
Claus Larsen-Jensen	1953	A Social Democrats	Østre		7 December 1993	14 December 1993	7 days
Bente Grønfeldt		V Liberals			9 December 1993	15 December 1993	6 days
Bodil Melgaard Haakonsen		D Centre Democrats			13 January 1994	23 January 1994	10 days
Ole Bernt Henriksen	1934	C Conservatives	Århus	Lars P. Gammelgaard	18 January 1994	11 February 1994	24 days
Jacob Lindenskov	1933	JF Social Democratic Party	Faroe Islands	Atli Dam	25 January 1994	14 February 1994	20 days
Bjarne Ørum		B Social Liberal Party			3 February 1994	4 March 1994	29 days
Bent Greve		A Social Democrats			1 March 1994	7 March 1994	6 days
Frederik Nørgaard	1940	A Social Democrats	Fyn	Erling Christensen	1 March 1994	7 March 1994	6 days
Frederik Nørgaard	1940	A Social Democrats	Fyn	Helen Beim	15 March 1994	24 March 1994	9 days
Bjarne Petersen		A Social Democrats			15 March 1994	24 March 1994	9 days
Bent Bundgaard		B Social Liberal Party			17 March 1994	11 April 1994	25 days
Peter Christian Christensen	1939	A Social Democrats	Århus	Martin Glerup	22 March 1994	28 March 1994	6 days
Lise Rasmussen		A Social Democrats			22 March 1994	28 March 1994	6 days
Christa Werge		A Social Democrats			22 March 1994	28 March 1994	6 days
Bendt Bendtsen	1954	C Conservatives	Fyn		5 April 1994	24 April 1994	19 days
Erling Hugger Jakobsen		A Social Democrats			5 April 1994	15 April 1994	10 days
Steffen Kjærulff-Schmidt		Z Progress Party			5 April 1994	1 May 1994	26 days
Frederik Nørgaard	1940	A Social Democrats	Fyn	Jimmy Stahr	5 April 1994	15 April 1994	10 days
Merete Aarup		C Conservatives			5 April 1994	6 May 1994	31 days
Inger Marie Bruun-Vierø	1942	B Social Liberal Party	Østre	Jørgen Estrup	12 April 1994	1 May 1994	19 days
Asger Jensen		A Social Democrats			12 April 1994	18 April 1994	6 days
Jacob Buksti		A Social Democrats			14 April 1994	28 April 1994	14 days
Peter Christian Christensen	1939	A Social Democrats	Århus	Ilse Hansen	14 April 1994	28 April 1994	14 days
Bjarne Petersen		A Social Democrats			14 April 1994	28 April 1994	14 days
Jens Skrumsager Skau		V Liberals			14 April 1994	28 April 1994	14 days
Johnny Killerup		V Liberals			14 April 1994	29 April 1994	15 days
Aage Frandsen		F Socialist People's Party			14 April 1994	2 May 1994	18 days
Kaj Stillinger		F Socialist People's Party			14 April 1994	2 May 1994	18 days
Bjarne Ørum		B Social Liberal Party			14 April 1994	2 May 1994	18 days
Charlotte Enevoldsen		D Centre Democrats			19 April 1994	6 May 1994	17 days
Erling Hugger Jakobsen		A Social Democrats			19 April 1994	25 April 1994	6 days
Lise Rasmussen		A Social Democrats			21 April 1994	28 April 1994	7 days
Peter Valenius		A Social Democrats			21 April 1994	28 April 1994	7 days
Peter Christian Christensen	1939	A Social Democrats	Århus	Martin Glerup	5 May 1994	11 May 1994	6 days
Claus Larsen-Jensen	1953	A Social Democrats	Østre		5 May 1994	11 May 1994	6 days
Bent Greve		A Social Democrats			17 May 1994	23 May 1994	6 days
