= List of members of the Folketing, 2001–2005 =

65th Folketing
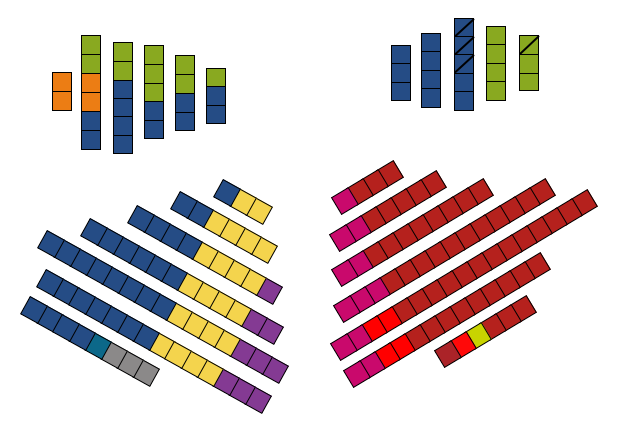
- Term: 20 November 2001 - 8 February 2005
- Speaker: V Ivar Hansen (until 2003); A Svend Auken (acting); V Christian Mejdahl (from 2003)
- Prime Minister: V Anders Fogh Rasmussen
- Cabinet: Fogh Rasmussen I
- Previous: 1998-2001
- Next: 2005-2007

This is a list of the 179 members of the Folketing, in the 2001 to 2005 session. They were elected at the 2001 general election.

== Election results ==
Denmark proper
Party	Votes	%	Seats	+/–
Venstre	1,077,858	31.2	56	+14
Social Democratic Party	1,003,323	29.1	52	–11
Danish People's Party	413,987	12.0	22	+9
Conservative People's Party	312,770	9.1	16	0
Socialist People's Party	219,842	6.4	12	–1
Danish Social Liberal Party	179,023	5.2	9	+2
Red-Green Alliance	82,685	2.4	4	–1
Christian People's Party	78,793	2.3	4	0
Centre Democrats	61,031	1.8	0	–8
Progress Party	19,340	0.5	0	–4
Independents	1,016	0.0	0	0
Invalid/blank votes	35,247	–	–	–
Total	3,484,915	100	175	0
Faroe Islands
Union Party	7,208	27.3	1	+1
Republican Party	6,578	24.9	1	+1
Social Democratic Party	6,187	23.4	0	–1
People's Party	5,417	20.5	0	–1
Centre Party	569	2.2	0	New
Self-Government Party	434	1.6	0	0
Invalid/blank votes	105	–	–	–
Total	26,393	100	2	0
Greenland
Inuit Ataqatigiit	7,172	30.8	1	+1
Siumut	6,033	25.9	1	0
Atassut	5,138	22.1	0	–1
Independents	4,917	21.1	0	0
Invalid/blank votes	559	–	–	–
Total	23,819	100	2	0
Source: Nohlen & Stöver

== Seat distribution ==
Below is the distribution of the 179 seats as it appeared after the 2001 election, as well at the distribution at the end of the term.

Party	Party leader	Elected seats	End seats	Change
A Social Democrats	Mogens Lykketoft	52	52	Steady
B Social Liberal Party	Marianne Jelved	9	9	Steady
C Conservatives	Bendt Bendtsen	16	16	Steady
F Socialist People's Party	Holger K. Nielsen	12	12	Steady
K Christian Democrats	Marianne Karlsmose	4	4	Steady
O Danish People's Party	Pia Kjærsgaard	22	22	Steady
V Liberals	Anders Fogh Rasmussen	56	53	▼3
Ø Red-Green Alliance	Collective leadership	4	4	Steady
TJ Republic	Høgni Hoydal	1	1	Steady
SP Union Party	Kaj Leo Johannesen	1	1	Steady
IA Community of the People	Josef Motzfeldt	1	1	Steady
SI Forward	Hans Enoksen	1	1	Steady
. Outside group		-	3	▲3

== Parliament members elected at the November 2001 election ==
Name	Birth year	Party	Constituency
Thomas Adelskov	1964	A Social Democrats	Vestsjælland
Keld Albrechtsen	1952	Ø Red-Green Alliance	Århus
Else Winther Andersen	1941	V Liberals	Århus
Hans Andersen	1974	V Liberals	Frederiksborg
Jytte Andersen	1942	A Social Democrats	Østre
Kim Andersen	1957	V Liberals	Århus
Poul Andersen	1952	A Social Democrats	Fyn
Sophie Hæstorp Andersen	1974	A Social Democrats	Vestre
Charlotte Antonsen	1959	V Liberals	Frederiksborg
Elisabeth Arnold	1941	B Social Liberal Party	Århus
Margrete Auken	1945	F Socialist People's Party	Frederiksborg
Svend Auken	1943	A Social Democrats	Århus
Line Barfod	1964	Ø Red-Green Alliance	Østre
Lars Barfoed	1957	C Conservatives	Frederiksborg
Jette Bergenholz Bautrup	1947	A Social Democrats	Søndre
Gitte Lillelund Bech	1969	V Liberals	København
Bendt Bendtsen	1954	C Conservatives	Fyn
Inger Bierbaum	1943	A Social Democrats	Sønderjylland
Ritt Bjerregaard	1941	A Social Democrats	Roskilde
René Skau Björnsson	1967	A Social Democrats	Århus
Mariann Fischer Boel	1943	V Liberals	Fyn
Sandy Brinck	1972	A Social Democrats	Vestsjælland
Colette Brix	1950	O Danish People's Party	Storstrøm
Peter Brixtofte	1949	V Liberals	Fyn
Sven Buhrkall	1949	V Liberals	Sønderjylland
Jacob Buksti	1947	A Social Democrats	Vestsjælland
Lotte Bundsgaard	1973	A Social Democrats	Fyn
Morten Bødskov	1970	A Social Democrats	København
Bent Bøgsted	1956	O Danish People's Party	Nordjylland
Anne Baastrup	1952	F Socialist People's Party	Fyn
Carina Christensen	1972	C Conservatives	Fyn
Ole Vagn Christensen	1943	A Social Democrats	Viborg
Peter Christensen	1975	V Liberals	Sønderjylland
Pia Christmas-Møller	1961	C Conservatives	København
Inge Dahl-Sørensen	1947	V Liberals	Østre
Kristian Thulesen Dahl	1969	O Danish People's Party	Fyn
Per Dalgaard	1944	O Danish People's Party	Århus
Freddy Dam	1948	V Liberals	Århus
Mikkel Dencker	1975	O Danish People's Party	København
Jørn Dohrmann	1969	O Danish People's Party	Vejle
Charlotte Dyremose	1977	C Conservatives	København
Inge-Lene Ebdrup	1975	V Liberals	Nordjylland
Lene Espersen	1965	C Conservatives	Nordjylland
Tove Fergo	1946	V Liberals	København
Poul Fischer	1948	O Danish People's Party	Fyn
Aage Frandsen	1941	F Socialist People's Party	Århus
Mette Frederiksen	1977	A Social Democrats	København
Louise Frevert	1953	O Danish People's Party	Vestre
Søren Gade	1963	V Liberals	Ringkøbing
Lene Garsdal	1947	F Socialist People's Party	Nordjylland
Pia Gjellerup	1959	A Social Democrats	Vestre
Carsten Hansen	1957	A Social Democrats	Fyn
Christian H. Hansen	1963	O Danish People's Party	Ringkøbing
Eva Kjer Hansen	1964	V Liberals	Vejle
Flemming Hansen	1939	C Conservatives	Vejle
Ivar Hansen	1938	V Liberals	Ribe
Pernille Blach Hansen	1974	A Social Democrats	Viborg
Torben Hansen	1965	A Social Democrats	Århus
Svend Heiselberg	1935	V Liberals	Viborg
Anne Grete Holmsgaard	1948	F Socialist People's Party	Østre
Morten Homann	1974	F Socialist People's Party	Århus
Birthe Rønn Hornbech	1943	V Liberals	Roskilde
Svend Erik Hovmand	1945	V Liberals	Storstrøm
Høgni Hoydal	1966	TJ Republic	Faroe Islands
Rikke Hvilshøj	1970	V Liberals	Vestre
Klaus Hækkerup	1943	A Social Democrats	Frederiksborg
Kaj Ikast	1935	C Conservatives	Sønderjylland
Marianne Jelved	1943	B Social Liberal Party	Nordjylland
Svend Aage Jensby	1940	V Liberals	Nordjylland
Carsten Bo Jensen	1958	A Social Democrats	Frederiksborg
Frank Jensen	1961	A Social Democrats	Nordjylland
Kristian Jensen	1971	V Liberals	Ringkøbing
Lene Jensen	1964	A Social Democrats	Storstrøm
Jette Jespersen	1940	O Danish People's Party	Frederiksborg
Jørn Jespersen	1955	F Socialist People's Party	Storstrøm
Karen Jespersen	1947	V Liberals	København
Lars-Emil Johansen	1946	SI Forward	Greenland
Poul Qvist Jørgensen	1941	A Social Democrats	Sønderjylland
Naser Khader	1963	B Social Liberal Party	Østre
Jens Kirk	1942	V Liberals	Ringkøbing
Knud Erik Kirkegaard	1942	C Conservatives	Ringkøbing
Henriette Kjær	1966	C Conservatives	Århus
Pia Kjærsgaard	1947	O Danish People's Party	København
Kuupik Kleist	1958	IA Community of the People	Greenland
Karen J. Klint	1947	A Social Democrats	Vejle
Anita Knakkergaard	1947	O Danish People's Party	Nordjylland
Jeppe Kofod	1974	A Social Democrats	Bornholm
Thor Gunnar Kofoed	1959	V Liberals	Bornholm
Bodil Kornbek	1961	K Christian Democrats	København
Ulrik Kragh	1970	V Liberals	Søndre
Søren Krarup	1937	O Danish People's Party	Sønderjylland
Henrik Dam Kristensen	1957	A Social Democrats	Ribe
Pia Kristensen	1953	O Danish People's Party	Roskilde
Per Kaalund	1937	A Social Democrats	København
Jesper Langballe	1939	O Danish People's Party	Viborg
Claus Larsen-Jensen	1953	A Social Democrats	Østre
Erik Larsen	1944	V Liberals	Fyn
Ester Larsen	1936	V Liberals	Vestsjælland
Flemming Damgaard Larsen	1951	V Liberals	Roskilde
Henrik Sass Larsen	1966	A Social Democrats	Roskilde
Jens Christian Larsen	1942	V Liberals	Nordjylland
Pia Larsen	1956	V Liberals	København
Uno Larsson	1942	O Danish People's Party	Århus
Gudrun Laub	1941	V Liberals	Nordjylland
Bjarne Laustsen	1953	A Social Democrats	Nordjylland
Martin Lidegaard	1966	B Social Liberal Party	Vestre
Lars Christian Lilleholt	1965	V Liberals	Fyn
Mogens Lykketoft	1946	A Social Democrats	København
Freddie Madsen	1943	O Danish People's Party	Ribe
Jens Hald Madsen	1968	V Liberals	Roskilde
Aase D. Madsen	1936	O Danish People's Party	København
Lissa Mathiasen	1948	A Social Democrats	Vejle
Christian Mejdahl	1939	V Liberals	Nordjylland
Anne-Marie Meldgaard	1948	A Social Democrats	Århus
Brian Mikkelsen	1966	C Conservatives	Vestsjælland
Lars Kramer Mikkelsen	1956	A Social Democrats	Østre
Leif Mikkelsen	1945	V Liberals	Århus
Helga Moos	1951	V Liberals	Sønderjylland
Erik Mortensen	1943	A Social Democrats	Nordjylland
Helge Mortensen	1941	A Social Democrats	Ribe
Anders Møller	1972	V Liberals	Vestsjælland
Helge Adam Møller	1942	C Conservatives	Storstrøm
Lone Møller	1949	A Social Democrats	Frederiksborg
Per Stig Møller	1942	C Conservatives	Vestre
Tina Nedergaard	1969	V Liberals	Nordjylland
Elsebeth Gerner Nielsen	1960	B Social Liberal Party	Vejle
Holger K. Nielsen	1950	F Socialist People's Party	København
Ole M. Nielsen	1940	K Christian Democrats	Nordjylland
Karsten Nonbo	1952	V Liberals	Storstrøm
Poul Nødgaard	1936	O Danish People's Party	Vestsjælland
Flemming Oppfeldt	1956	V Liberals	København
Jørn Pedersen	1947	A Social Democrats	Århus
Marianne Pedersen	1944	V Liberals	Vestsjælland
Thor Pedersen	1945	V Liberals	Frederiksborg
Jan Petersen	1958	A Social Democrats	Århus
Lisbeth Petersen	1939	SP Union Party	Faroe Islands
Morten Helveg Petersen	1966	B Social Liberal Party	København
Niels Helveg Petersen	1939	B Social Liberal Party	Fyn
Troels Lund Poulsen	1976	V Liberals	Vejle
Kamal Qureshi	1970	F Socialist People's Party	Søndre
Anders Fogh Rasmussen	1953	V Liberals	København
Lars Løkke Rasmussen	1964	V Liberals	Frederiksborg
Poul Nyrup Rasmussen	1943	A Social Democrats	Ringkøbing
Jens Rohde	1970	V Liberals	Viborg
Pernille Rosenkrantz-Theil	1977	Ø Red-Green Alliance	Fyn
Preben Rudiengaard	1944	V Liberals	Ribe
Anders Samuelsen	1967	B Social Liberal Party	Vestsjælland
Peder Sass	1943	A Social Democrats	Storstrøm
Hans Christian Schmidt	1953	V Liberals	Sønderjylland
Grete Schødts	1945	A Social Democrats	Fyn
Gitte Seeberg	1960	C Conservatives	Roskilde
Hanne Severinsen	1944	V Liberals	Ringkøbing
Irene Simonsen	1958	V Liberals	Vejle
Niels Sindal	1950	A Social Democrats	Fyn
Helle Sjelle	1971	C Conservatives	Østre
Jann Sjursen	1963	K Christian Democrats	Århus
Birthe Skaarup	1939	O Danish People's Party	Århus
Peter Skaarup	1964	O Danish People's Party	Østre
Ole Sohn	1954	F Socialist People's Party	Vestsjælland
Ole Stavad	1949	A Social Democrats	Nordjylland
Inger Støjberg	1973	V Liberals	Viborg
Søren Søndergaard	1955	Ø Red-Green Alliance	København
Else Theill Sørensen	1941	C Conservatives	Viborg
Frode Sørensen	1946	A Social Democrats	Sønderjylland
Karina Sørensen	1982	O Danish People's Party	Vejle
Villy Søvndal	1952	F Socialist People's Party	Vejle
Arne Toft	1948	A Social Democrats	Nordjylland
Kristen Touborg	1943	F Socialist People's Party	Ringkøbing
Jan Trøjborg	1955	A Social Democrats	Vejle
Ulla Tørnæs	1962	V Liberals	Ribe
Jens Peter Vernersen	1947	A Social Democrats	Ringkøbing
Eyvind Vesselbo	1946	V Liberals	Århus
Margrethe Vestager	1968	B Social Liberal Party	Frederiksborg
Henrik Vestergaard	1966	V Liberals	Århus
Jens Vibjerg	1949	V Liberals	Vejle
Tove Videbæk	1945	K Christian Democrats	Ringkøbing
Nicolai Wammen	1971	A Social Democrats	Århus
Jørgen Winther	1945	V Liberals	Århus
Jytte Wittrock	1945	A Social Democrats	Storstrøm

== Party and member changes after the November 2001 elections ==
=== Party changes ===
Below are all parliament members that have joined another party or become independent during the term.

Name	Old party	Constituency	New party	Date
Peter Brixtofte	V Liberals	Fyn	. Independent	14 May 2002
Anders Møller	V Liberals	Vestsjælland	. Independent	21 October 2002
Flemming Oppfeldt	V Liberals	København	. Independent	18 October 2004

=== Lasting member changes ===
Below are member changes that lasted through the entire term.

Replacement	Birth year	Party	Constituency	Replaced MP	Date	Reason
Mogens Nørgaard Pedersen	1957	K Christian Democrats	Nordjylland	Ole M. Nielsen	10 September 2002	Nielsen resigned his seat.
Christian Lund Jepsen	1959	V Liberals	Ribe	Ivar Hansen	11 March 2003	Hansen passed away.
Henning Gjellerod	1940	A Social Democrats	Ringkøbing	Poul Nyrup Rasmussen	8 July 2004	Rasmussen resigned his seat.
Margot Torp	1944	A Social Democrats	Ribe	Henrik Dam Kristensen	8 July 2004	Kristensen resigned his seat.
Ida Jørgensen	1964	B Social Liberal Party	Vestsjælland	Anders Samuelsen	15 July 2004	Samuelsen resigned his seat.
Poul Henrik Hedeboe	1946	F Socialist People's Party	Frederiksborg	Margrete Auken	16 July 2004	Auken resigned her seat.
Christian Wedell-Neergaard	1956	C Conservatives	Roskilde	Gitte Seeberg	20 July 2004	Seeberg resigned her seat.
Erling Bonnesen	1955	V Liberals	Fyn	Mariann Fischer Boel	7 October 2004	Boel resigned her seat.
Lise Hækkerup	1947	V Liberals	København	Karen Jespersen	11 November 2004	Jespersen resigned her seat.

=== Temporary member changes ===
Below are temporary member replacements during the term.

Replacement	Birth year	Party	Constituency	Replaced MP	Start	End	Length
Tórbjørn Jacobsen	1955	TJ Republic	Faroe Islands	Høgni Hoydal	14 December 2001	17 February 2004	795 days
Christian Lund Jepsen	1959	V Liberals	Ribe	Ulla Tørnæs	8 January 2002	6 February 2002	29 days
Anders Stenild		C Conservatives	Nordjylland	Lene Espersen	8 January 2002	28 January 2002	20 days
Christian Brix Møller		B Social Liberal Party	Vejle	Elsebeth Gerner Nielsen	15 January 2002	14 April 2002	89 days
Pernille Falcon		Ø Red-Green Alliance	København	Søren Søndergaard	21 January 2002	27 January 2002	6 days
Poul Henrik Hedeboe	1946	F Socialist People's Party	Frederiksborg	Margrete Auken	21 January 2002	27 January 2002	6 days
Morten Østergaard	1976	B Social Liberal Party	Århus	Elisabeth Arnold	21 January 2002	27 January 2002	6 days
Pernille Falcon		Ø Red-Green Alliance	København	Søren Søndergaard	19 February 2002	25 February 2002	6 days
Erling Christensen		A Social Democrats	Fyn	Lotte Bundsgaard	12 March 2002	22 May 2002	71 days
Hans Kristian Skibby	1969	O Danish People's Party	Vejle	Karina Sørensen	16 April 2002	31 May 2002	45 days
Pernille Falcon		Ø Red-Green Alliance	København	Søren Søndergaard	20 April 2002	26 April 2002	6 days
Morten Østergaard	1976	B Social Liberal Party	Århus	Elisabeth Arnold	20 April 2002	26 April 2002	6 days
Holger Gorm Petersen		O Danish People's Party	Vejle	Jørn Dohrmann	21 May 2002	31 May 2002	10 days
Søren Egge Rasmussen	1961	Ø Red-Green Alliance	Århus	Keld Albrechtsen	23 May 2002	30 May 2002	7 days
Niels-Ole Hegglands		C Conservatives	Vestre	Per Stig Møller	3 October 2002	11 December 2002	69 days
Jørgen S. Lundsgaard	1945	C Conservatives	Fyn	Bendt Bendtsen	3 October 2002	11 December 2002	69 days
Pernille Falcon		Ø Red-Green Alliance	København	Søren Søndergaard	22 October 2002	15 November 2002	24 days
Lise Hækkerup	1947	A Social Democrats	København	Mogens Lykketoft	22 October 2002	8 November 2002	17 days
Kenneth Lambrecht		O Danish People's Party	København	Aase D. Madsen	22 October 2002	10 November 2002	19 days
Sanne Rubinke	1961	F Socialist People's Party	Vejle	Villy Søvndal	22 October 2002	10 November 2002	19 days
Lise Hækkerup	1947	A Social Democrats	København	Mette Frederiksen	6 December 2002	1 April 2003	116 days
Kenneth Lambrecht		O Danish People's Party	København	Mikkel Dencker	7 January 2003	19 January 2003	12 days
Pernille Falcon		Ø Red-Green Alliance	København	Søren Søndergaard	25 January 2003	31 January 2003	6 days
Poul Henrik Hedeboe	1946	F Socialist People's Party	Frederiksborg	Margrete Auken	25 January 2003	31 January 2003	6 days
Morten Østergaard	1976	B Social Liberal Party	Århus	Elisabeth Arnold	25 January 2003	31 January 2003	6 days
Kim Sejr	1959	B Social Liberal Party	Frederiksborg	Margrethe Vestager	28 January 2003	30 June 2003	153 days
Ane Hansen	1961	IA Community of the People	Greenland	Kuupik Kleist	18 February 2003	28 February 2003	10 days
Jørgen Bastholm		V Liberals	Vejle	Troels Lund Poulsen	29 April 2003	15 May 2003	16 days
Pernille Falcon		Ø Red-Green Alliance	København	Søren Søndergaard	5 May 2003	13 May 2003	8 days
Palle Andersen		V Liberals	Vestsjælland	Anders Møller	6 May 2003	4 June 2003	29 days
Nina Berrig	1940	C Conservatives	Østre	Helle Sjelle	6 May 2003	15 May 2003	9 days
Anders Stenild		C Conservatives	Nordjylland	Lene Espersen	9 September 2003	26 October 2003	47 days
Helle Christensen		A Social Democrats	Nordjylland	Frank Jensen	21 October 2003	14 November 2003	24 days
Betina Hoffmann		K Christian Democrats	Århus	Jann Sjursen	21 October 2003	14 November 2003	24 days
Flemming Møller	1950	V Liberals	Frederiksborg	Hans Andersen	21 October 2003	14 November 2003	24 days
Lise von Seelen	1949	A Social Democrats	Sønderjylland	Poul Qvist Jørgensen	21 October 2003	14 November 2003	24 days
Marianne Pedersen		V Liberals	København	Pia Larsen	30 October 2003	7 November 2003	8 days
Egil Møller	1941	O Danish People's Party	Frederiksborg	Jette Jespersen	6 November 2003	19 December 2003	43 days
Stiig Wæver		C Conservatives	Storstrøm	Helge Adam Møller	6 November 2003	12 November 2003	6 days
Pernille Falcon		Ø Red-Green Alliance	København	Søren Søndergaard	10 November 2003	16 November 2003	6 days
Marie Daugaard		F Socialist People's Party	Søndre	Kamal Qureshi	8 December 2003	19 December 2003	11 days
Birgitte Josefsen	1951	V Liberals	Nordjylland	Tina Nedergaard	13 January 2004	30 April 2004	108 days
Bjørn Westh	1944	A Social Democrats	Viborg	Pernille Blach Hansen	13 January 2004	4 June 2004	143 days
Bjarne Holm		O Danish People's Party	Viborg	Jesper Langballe	20 January 2004	27 January 2004	7 days
Pernille Falcon		Ø Red-Green Alliance	København	Søren Søndergaard	26 January 2004	1 February 2004	6 days
Morten Østergaard	1976	B Social Liberal Party	Århus	Elisabeth Arnold	26 January 2004	1 February 2004	6 days
Mogens Lønborg	1952	C Conservatives	København	Charlotte Dyremose	2 February 2004	8 February 2004	6 days
Jan Kristiansen		V Liberals	Nordjylland	Inge-Lene Ebdrup	9 March 2004	30 April 2004	52 days
Ejner Jensen		A Social Democrats	Vestre	Sophie Hæstorp Andersen	13 April 2004	4 June 2004	52 days
Pernille Falcon		Ø Red-Green Alliance	København	Søren Søndergaard	19 April 2004	29 April 2004	10 days
Henning Gjellerod	1940	A Social Democrats	Ringkøbing	Poul Nyrup Rasmussen	1 July 2004	8 July 2004	7 days
Margot Torp	1944	A Social Democrats	Ribe	Henrik Dam Kristensen	1 July 2004	8 July 2004	7 days
Poul Henrik Hedeboe	1946	F Socialist People's Party	Frederiksborg	Margrete Auken	1 July 2004	16 July 2004	15 days
Ida Jørgensen	1967	B Social Liberal Party	Vestsjælland	Anders Samuelsen	1 July 2004	15 July 2004	14 days
Christian Wedell-Neergaard	1956	C Conservatives	Roskilde	Gitte Seeberg	1 July 2004	20 July 2004	19 days
Pia Boisen	1956	Ø Red-Green Alliance	København	Søren Søndergaard	18 October 2004	12 November 2004	25 days
Jakob Jensen		A Social Democrats	Viborg	Ole Vagn Christensen	19 October 2004	12 November 2004	24 days
Birgitte Josefsen	1951	V Liberals	Nordjylland	Svend Aage Jensby	19 October 2004	12 November 2004	24 days
Lykke Krapalis		O Danish People's Party	Fyn	Poul Fischer	19 October 2004	12 November 2004	24 days
Flemming Møller	1950	V Liberals	Storstrøm	Karsten Nonbo	19 October 2004	12 November 2004	24 days
Marion Pedersen	1949	V Liberals	København	Gitte Lillelund Bech	19 October 2004	12 November 2004	24 days
Søren Hansen		A Social Democrats	Vestsjælland	Sandy Brinck	11 January 2005	20 January 2005	9 days
Jesper Kiel	1966	Ø Red-Green Alliance	Fyn	Pernille Rosenkrantz-Theil	13 January 2005	20 January 2005	7 days
Birgitte Møller		B Social Liberal Party	Østre	Naser Khader	13 January 2005	24 January 2005	11 days
