= Elisabeth Arnold (Danish politician) =

Danish politician

Member of the Folketing
- In office 10 May 1988 – 13 November 2007
- Constituency: Aarhus County Constituency

Personal details
- Born: 20 October 1941 (age 84) Frederiksberg
- Party: Danish Social Liberal Party
- Education: University of Copenhagen

Elisabeth Arnold (born 20 October 1941) is a Danish politician who was a member of the Danish Parliament for the Danish Social Liberal Party.

== Biography ==
Arnold was development manager in Aarhus.

A member of the Danish Social Liberal Party, she was elected to the Folketing in the Århus Amtskreds Constituency at the 1988 Danish general election. She was a member of the Folketingets Præsidium from 1 October 1996 to 11 March 1998.

Arnold was born on 20 October 1941 in Frederiksberg, the daughter of civil engineer Viggo Arnold and housewife Sigrid Margaret Arnold.

She was a modern Danish student from Holte Gymnasium in 1960. She graduated with a Master of Science (Biochemistry) from the University of Copenhagen in 1969.

From 1980 to 1988, she was a department manager at A/S Dumex. She was Member of the board of the Research Centre at Hørsholm 1981–87, chairman 1985–87. She was Member of the board of A/S Dumex 1974-80 and of the board of Danmarks Radio 1987–88. She was Member of the board of representatives of the Danish Arts Foundation 1988-90 and of the board of representatives of the Aarhus Symphony Orchestra since 1988. She was Member of the board of the Support Centre Against Incest, Copenhagen, 1991–93. Member of the board of the Submarine Foundation 1992–95. She was Member of the board of Tryg life insurance and Tryg pension since 1993. She was chairman of the government's international equality committee from 1997.

Member of the Danish delegation to the Parliamentary Assembly of the Council of Europe from 1989. Tax spokesman for the Danish Social Liberal Party from 1988 to 1998. Deputy Chairman of the Danish Parliament's European Affairs Committee 1994–2001. Spokesperson for the Danish Social Liberal Party in matters concerning the Danish Parliament's Legal Affairs Committee (Folketingets Retsudvalg), Education Committee and European Affairs Committee.

She was the party's candidate in the Sundby constituency from 1979, in the Enghave constituency from 1981, in the Valby and Slots constituencies from 1984 and in the Aarhus West constituency from 1988.

== Sources ==
- Gammelt portrætfoto

== See also ==
- List of members of the Folketing, 2005–2007
- List of members of the Folketing, 2001–2005
- List of members of the Folketing, 1998–2001
- List of members of the Folketing, 1994–1998
- List of members of the Folketing, 1990–1994
- List of members of the Folketing, 1988–1990
