= Sonja Mikkelsen =

Danish politician (born 1955)

Minister for Health
- In office 2000
- Preceded by: Carsten Koch
- Succeeded by: Arne Rolighed

Minister for Traffic
- In office 1998–2000
- Preceded by: Bjørn Westh
- Succeeded by: Jacob Buksti

Member of Parliament
- In office 1981–1984

Personal details
- Born: 20 June 1955 (age 71) Thy, Jutland, Denmark
- Party: Social Democrats (Denmark)

Sonja Mikkelsen (born 20 June 1955) is a Danish politician.

She was born in Thy to Kristian Mikkelsen and Margith Nielsen, and married Ole Kristensen in 1990. She was elected member of Folketinget for the Social Democrats from 1981 to 1984, and again from 1990. She was appointed Minister for Traffic from 1998 to 2000, and Minister for Health in 2000, as a member of the Poul Nyrup Rasmussen IV Cabinet.
