= Anne Birgitte Lundholt =

Danish politician and businessperson

Minister of Energy
- In office 18 December 1990 – 25 January 1993
- Monarch: Margrethe II
- Prime Minister: Poul Schlüter
- Preceded by: Svend Erik Hovmand
- Succeeded by: Jens Bilgrav-Nielsen

Minister of Industry
- In office 2 December 1989 – 25 January 1993
- Monarch: Margrethe II
- Prime Minister: Poul Schlüter
- Preceded by: Nils Wilhjelm
- Succeeded by: Jan Trøjborg

Member of the Folketing for Ringkøbing County
- In office 12 December 1990 – 8 October 1997

Personal details
- Born: 11 June 1952 (age 74) Fredericia, Denmark
- Party: Conservative People's Party
- Education: Aarhus University (1971–1977); Copenhagen Business School (1980–1983)
- Occupation: Businessperson
- Awards: Commander of the Order of the Dannebrog

Anne Birigitte Lundholt (born 11 June 1952) is a Danish politician of the Conservative People's Party and businessperson who served in the Danish Government and the Folketing. She was deputy director of the industry organization Textile Industry from 1980 to 1988, deputy chair of the Junior Chamber Denmark between 1983 and 1984 and CEO later chair of the Furniture Manufacturers Association (later the Danish Furniture Industry) in 1988. Lundholt was appointed Minister of Industry in 1989 and as Minister of Energy the following year, standing down from both posts in 1993. She was a member of the Folketing for the Ringkøbing County constituency from 1990 to 1997. Lundholt was appointed Commander of the Order of the Dannebrog in 1990.

== Early life and education ==
Lundholt was born in Fredericia on 11 June 1952. She is the daughter of the engineer Niels Ebbe Lundholt and the office assistant and homemaker Aase Andreasen Lundholt. Lundholt has one elder brother and was raised in Fredericia. In 1966, she joined the Young Conservatives in Fredericia to protest the cooperation of the Social Democrats and the Socialist People's Party after the two parties gained the most seats in the Folketing. Lundholt was the Young Conservatives' chair from 1969 to 1970, and became a mathematics student at Fredericia Gymnasium in 1971. She then studied political science at Aarhus University between 1971 and 1977. Lundholt enrolled in the Home Guard and was a member of the constituency board of The Conservative People's Party in Aarhus during her time at Aarhus University.

== Career ==
She unsuccessfully ran for the Folketing at the three general elections held each year from 1975 to 1979 in the constituencies of Givekredsen, Vordingborgkredsen and Sundbykredsen. Following Lundholt's graduation as cand.scient.pol. in 1977, she moved to Copenhagen and was employed as a secretary at the Danish Employers' Association from 1977 to 1980. Lundholt endorsed equality between men and women but not positive discrimination due to her belief that "women had to fight on their existing terms".

In 1980, she became office manager and later deputy director of the industry organization Textile Industry. Lundholt simultaneously studied for a higher diploma in foreign trade at the Copenhagen Business School until 1983. From 1983 to 1984, she was deputy chair of the Junior Chamber Denmark. Lundholt was appointed CEO of the Furniture Manufacturers Association (later the Danish Furniture Industry) in 1988 and was promoted to chair the following year. She was an examiner at the Copenhagen Business School's course in international economics and business management between 1988 and 1989 and again from 1993.

Lundholt accepted the offer of the post of Minister of Industry by the Prime Minister Poul Schlüter and she took up the position on 2 December 1989. The following year, she was appointed Minister of Energy to become a dual minister and she served in the position from 18 December 1990 to the fall of the Schulter government on 24 January 1993. At the 1990 Danish general election, she was elected to represent the constituency of Ringkøbing County for The Conservative People's Party in the Folketing from 12 December of that year. As Minister of Industry, Lundholt opposed subsidies for the business industry in the form of business promotion and supporting outsourcing. While the Minister of Industry, she had to deal with opposition to the adoption of a carbon dioxide tax. Lundholt was The Conservative People's Party's political spokesperson from 1995 to 1997. She resigned her post following an election to appoint a new party chair in 1997. Lundholt left the Folketing on 8 October 1997. Between 19 March 1997 and 7 November 1997, she was a member of the Parliamentary Assembly of the Council of Europe.

She held a number of posts in the business industry. From 1997 to June 2005, Lundholt was the CEO of the industry organisation Danish Bacon before she tendered her resignation. She was appointed to the board of the bank Nordea at its general meeting in Stockholm in April 2005, and was appointed the chair of the board of Banedanmark by the Ministry of Transport and Energy in late March 2006. She was CEO of the Veterinary Medical Industry Association between 2007 and 2011 and was appointed an export ambassador for South Korea, Turkey and Vietnam by the Danish Government in 2011 before the scheme was ended in November 2011 following the election of Helle Thorning-Schmidt.

== Awards ==
In 1990, Lundholt was appointed Commander of the Order of the Dannebrog. That same year, she was named Politician of the Year for 1990.
