= Grethe Rostbøll =

Danish politician (1941–2021)

Minister for Culture
- In office 18 December 1990 – 25 January 1993
- Preceded by: Ole Vig Jensen
- Succeeded by: Jytte Hilden

Member of the Folketing
- In office 3 November 1996 – 11 March 1998
- Constituency: Copenhagen County constituency
- In office 24 October 1995 – 17 November 1995
- Constituency: Copenhagen County constituency

Personal details
- Born: 30 May 1941 Aarhus, Nazi-occupied Denmark
- Died: 26 July 2021 (aged 80)
- Party: DKF

Grethe Rostbøll (30 May 1941 – 26 July 2021) was a Danish politician. She was a member of the Conservative People's Party (DKF) and was associated with the People's Movement against the EU.

== Biography ==
Born in Aarhus, Rostbøll was the daughter of a farmer, Gustav Fogh, and Ellen Marie Brandt. She served as Minister of Culture from 1990 to 1993 under the fourth government of Poul Schlüter. She also served in the Folketing in 1995 and again from 1996 to 1998. She ran for the European Parliament in 1979 and was later a candidate for the Folketing in 1990,
