= Henrik Dam Kristensen =

Danish politician

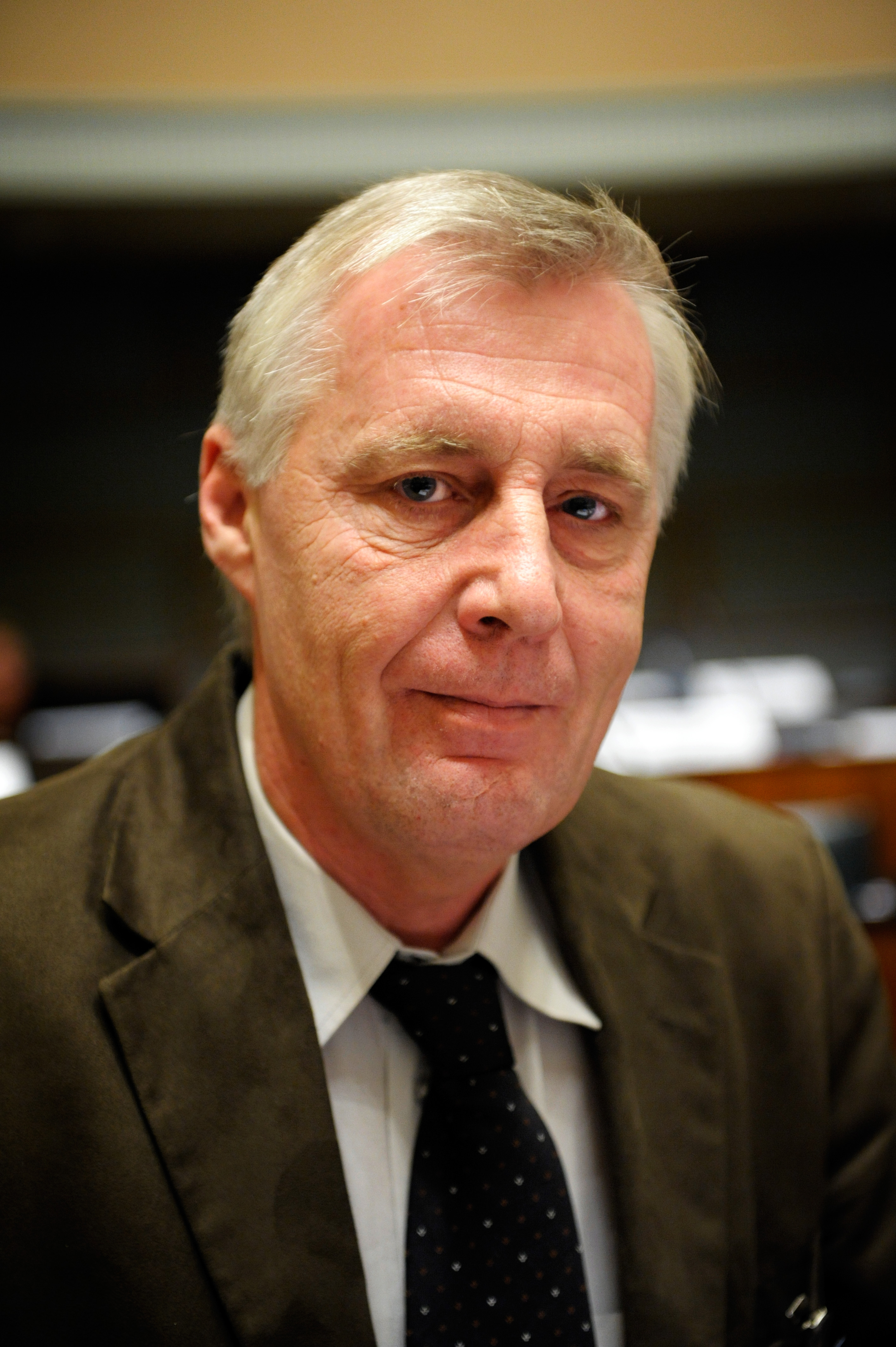
- Kristensen in 2008

Speaker of the Folketing
- In office 21 June 2019 – 1 November 2022
- Monarch: Margrethe II
- Preceded by: Pia Kjærsgaard
- Succeeded by: Søren Gade

Minister for Employment
- In office 10 October 2014 – 28 June 2015
- Prime Minister: Helle Thorning-Schmidt
- Preceded by: Mette Frederiksen
- Succeeded by: Jørn Neergaard Larsen

Minister of Transport
- In office 3 October 2011 – 9 August 2013
- Prime Minister: Helle Thorning-Schmidt
- Preceded by: Hans Christian Schmidt
- Succeeded by: Pia Olsen Dyhr

Minister of Social Affairs
- In office 23 February 2000 – 27 November 2001
- Prime Minister: Poul Nyrup Rasmussen
- Preceded by: Karen Jespersen
- Succeeded by: Henriette Kjær

Minister of Food, Agriculture and Fisheries
- In office 27 September 1994 – 23 February 2000
- Prime Minister: Poul Nyrup Rasmussen
- Preceded by: Bjørn Westh
- Succeeded by: Ritt Bjerregaard

Member of the Folketing
- In office 13 November 2007 – 1 November 2022
- Constituency: East Jutland
- In office 12 December 1990 – 7 July 2004
- Constituency: Ribe

Member of the European Parliament for Denmark
- In office 2004–2006

President of the Nordic Council
- In office 1 January 2016 – 31 December 2016
- Preceded by: Höskuldur Þórhallsson
- Succeeded by: Britt Lundberg
- In office 1 January 2011 – 31 December 2011
- Preceded by: Helgi Hjörvar
- Succeeded by: Kimmo Sasi

Personal details
- Born: Henrik Dam Kristensen; 31 January 1957 (age 69) Vorbasse, Denmark
- Party: Social Democrats
- Spouse: Bente Dam Kristensen
- Children: Christina Dam Kristensen og Jannick Dam Kristensen

Henrik Dam Kristensen (born 31 January 1957) is a Danish politician and a former speaker of the Danish parliament. He has been a member of the Danish parliament for the Social Democrats from 1990 to 2004 and again from 2007, during which he served as Minister for Agriculture and Fisheries (1994–1996), Minister for Food (1996–2000), Minister for Social Affairs (2000–2001), Minister for Transport (2011–2013) and Minister for Employment (2014–2015). He served as President of the Nordic Council in 2011 and 2016.

== Background ==
Kristensen was born in Vorbasse to Ove Dam Kristensen and Gudrun Dam Kristensen. From 1978 to 1986 he worked as a postman in Vorbasse, and also worked with the Danish Refugee Council from 1986 to 1988. From 1988 to 1990 he worked as a principal at a school. He is married to Bente Dam Kristensen.

== Political career ==
Kristensen was first elected to the Folketing in 1990, and reelected in 1994, 1998, and 2001. From 1996 to 2000 he was Minister of Food, until 2000, where he became Minister of Social Affairs. Kristensen ran in the 2004 European Parliament election and was elected as a member of the European Parliament. To perform in his new position, Kristensen resigned his seat in the Folketing. Margot Torp took over his seat. In the European Parliament, Kristensen sat on the European Parliament's Committee on Fisheries, the Committee on the Internal Market and Consumer Protection and the Delegation for Relations with the Countries of South-East Europe.

In 2006 Kristensen resigned his seat from the European Parliament, and the seat was taken over by Christel Schaldemose. He became the party secretary of the Social Democrats. He ran for the Folketing again in the 2007 Danish general election, where he was elected. He was reelected in 2011. On 3 October 2011 Kristensen was appointed to the post of Minister for Transport in the Cabinet of Helle Thorning-Schmidt, and left office on 9 August 2013. On 10 October 2014 he again entered the cabinet, when he was appointed the position of Minister for Employment.

Kristensen was reelected into the Folketing in the 2015 and 2019 elections. On 21 June 2019 Kristensen was appointed speaker of the Danish parliament, replacing Pia Kjærsgaard. Kristensen served as speaker between 2019 and November 2022, when Søren Gade became speaker.

In 2011 Denmark was to appoint a president of the Nordic Council and Kristensen was chosen. He was president again in 2016.

Political offices
Preceded by Bjørn Westh	Minister of Agriculture and Fisheries; 1994—1996	Succeeded by Ritt Bjerregaard
Preceded by New position	Minister of Food; 1996—2000	Succeeded by Ritt Bjerregaard
Preceded by Karen Jespersen	Minister of Social Affairs; 2000—2001	Succeeded by Henriette Kjær
Preceded by Hans Christian Schmidt	Minister of Transport; 2011—2013	Succeeded by Pia Olsen Dyhr
Preceded by Mette Frederiksen	Minister for Employment; 2014—2015	Succeeded by Jørn Neergaard Larsen
Preceded by Pia Kjærsgaard	Speaker of the Folketing; 2019–2022	Succeeded by Søren Gade
Transnational offices
Preceded by Helgi Hjörvar	President of the Nordic Council; 2011–2012	Succeeded by Kimmo Sasi
Preceded by Höskuldur Þórhallsson	President of the Nordic Council; 2016–2017	Succeeded by Britt Lundberg
