= Tove Fergo =

Danish politician (1946–2015)

Tove Fergo (24 September 1946 – 4 October 2015) was a Danish vicar and politician representing the liberal party Venstre. She was a member of the Danish parliament (Folketinget) from 21 September 1994 until 8 February 2005 when she was not re-elected.

She was a vicar at Simon Peters Kirke on Amager, Copenhagen, Denmark from 1973. She was the Minister for Ecclesiastical Affairs from 27 November 2001 to 18 February 2005 in the Cabinet of Anders Fogh Rasmussen I.

She died on 4 October 2015.

Political offices
Preceded by Johannes Lebech	Minister for Ecclesiastical Affairs of Denmark; 27 November 2001 – 18 February 2005	Succeeded by Bertel Haarder
