= Jens Peter Vernersen =

Danish politician (1947–2025)

Member of the Folketing
- In office 21 September 1994 – 15 September 2011
- Constituency: Ringkøbing County constituency (1994–2007); West Jutland (2007–2011)

Personal details
- Born: 3 May 1947 Rønbjerg, Skive, Denmark
- Died: 3 June 2025 (aged 78)
- Party: S
- Education: Skive Handelsskole
- Occupation: Businessman

Jens Peter Vernersen (3 May 1947 – 3 June 2025) was a Danish politician. A member of the Social Democrats, he served in the Folketing from 1994 to 2011.

Vernersen died on 3 June 2025, at the age of 78.
