= Hans-Pavia Rosing =

Greenlandic politician and civil servant

Hans-Pavia Rosing (22 June 1948 – 9 July 2018) was a Greenlandic politician and civil servant. In 1985, he received the Greenland Peace Prize. In 1987, he became a member of the Inatsisartut, serving as Minister of Economic Affairs for a specific time. Rosing served two terms as the head of the Inuit Circumpolar Council (1980-1986).
