= Hanne Andersen (politician) =

Danish politician (1939–2024)

- Born: 2 April 1939; Copenhagen
- Died: 3 March 2024 (aged 84); Copenhagen
- Occupation: Politician

Hanne Andersen (2 April 1939 – 3 March 2024) was a Danish politician who served as a member of the Folketing. Born in Copenhagen on 2 April 1939, she died on 3 March 2024, aged 84.
