= Ester Larsen =

Danish politician (1936–2025)

Member of the Folketing for the Vestsjælland County constituency
- In office 21 September 1994 – 8 February 2005

Minister of Health
- In office 7 December 1989 – 25 January 1993
- Monarch: Margrethe II
- Prime Minister: Poul Schlüter
- Preceded by: Elsebeth Kock-Petersen
- Succeeded by: Torben Lund

Personal details
- Born: 23 May 1936 Copenhagen, Denmark
- Died: 18 January 2025 (aged 88)
- Party: Venstre
- Spouse(s): Kaj Jørgen L. (m. 1958; div. 1983) Niels Erik Nielsen (m. 1994)
- Children: 3
- Occupation: Politician; Schoolteacher

Ester Larsen (23 May 1936 – 18 January 2025) was a Danish Venstre politician and schoolteacher who served as the Danish Minister of Health under the final two governments of Prime Minister Poul Schlüter from 1989 to 1993. She was a member of the Folketing as a representative of the Vestsjælland County constituency between 1994 and 2005. Larsen was appointed Commander of the Order of the Dannebrog in 1990.

== Early life ==
Larsen was born in Copenhagen on 23 May 1936, to the Chief Agronomist Inspector Laurs Sørensen Thøgersen and the nurse Laurs Sørensen Thøgersen. She graduated from Snoghøj Gymnastikhøjskole in 1952, and then earned qualifications in Mathematics and Science from Rysensteen Gymnasium three years later. In 1956, Larsen enrolled at Frederiksberg Seminarium, and graduated from it three years later because she had successfully trained as a teacher.

== Career ==
From 1959 to 1963, she worked as a primary school teacher in Frederiksberg. Larsen was chair of the Viby School Board between 1966 and 1970 and served as chair of the Mesinge School Board from 1966 to 1978. She was the author of Reflekslys in 1967 and Pragtfulde dage in 1970. She graduated from Odense University with a Candidate of Philosophy in 1974. Larsen became a secondary school teacher at Fyns Studenterkursus and Sct. Knuds Gymnasium in Odense from 1974 to 1978. She also wrote three collections of Christmas stories between 1978 and 1980. Larsen was a member of the Board of Representatives of both the Danish Arts Foundation and the Danish Cultural Institute and was a bureau member of the Osteoporosis Association. Between 1982 and 1989, she was a member of the Kerteminde Museum's board, and the board of Odense Teater.

Larsen was elected as a member of the Kerteminde City Council for the Venstre political party in 1974 and she stood down from the council 15 years later. She was chair of the Education and Culture Committee of Kerteminde City Council between 1978 and 1986. Larsen stood on the Funen County Council from 1978 to 1989. Between 1986 and 1989, she was a board member of the County Council Association's board, the Health Insurance Negotiating Committee, the supervisory board of the Municipal Audit Department and the primary board of the Venstre political party. Larsen was the national chairperson of the Liberal Enlightenment Association from 1988 to 1989 and also had a five-year stint as chair of the Liberal Enlightenment Association in Kerteminde-Munkebo. She was author of the book Digtning og Dansk in 1987, Jul på borgen four years later, and Familiekundskab – en levende bog om livet in 1994.

At the 1988 Danish general election, she unsuccessfully stood for election to represent the Odense Sydkredsen constituency in the Folketing. Larsen also stood to represent the Sorøkredsen constituency at the 1990 Danish general election and was again unsuccessful. She was appointed to the Minister of Health from 7 December 1989 and remained in the role until she resigned the ministership on 25 January 1993 during the final two government cabinets of Prime Minister Poul Schlüter. At the 1994 Danish general election on 21 September of that year, Larsen won election to represent the Vestsjælland County constituency in the Folketing. From 1994 to 1998, she was chair of the Folketing's Health Committee and was chair of The Council of Ethics between 1998 and 2005. Larsen served a second term on the County Council Association's board from 1994 and on the supervisory board of the Municipal Audit Department from 1998 to 2005. She was the cultural spokesperson of Venstre from 2001 to 2005. Larsen left the Folketing at the 2005 Danish general election which was held on 8 February 2005.

== Personal life and death ==
Larsen had three children from her first marriage to the parish priest Kaj Jørgen L. from 5 July 1958 to their divorce in 1983. Larsen was married to the consulting engineer Niels Erik Nielsen from 17 April 1994. In 1990, she was appointed Commander of the Order of the Dannebrog. Larsen died on 18 January 2025, at the age of 88.
