= Jacob Buksti =

Danish politician

Minister of Transport of Denmark
- In office 23 February 2000 – 11 November 2001
- Prime Minister: Poul Nyrup Rasmussen
- Preceded by: Sonja Mikkelsen
- Succeeded by: Flemming Hansen

Member of the Folketing
- In office 1994–2005

Personal details
- Born: 7 April 1947
- Died: 27 September 2016 (aged 69)
- Party: Social Democrats
- Education: Aarhus University

Jacob Anthonius Buksti (7 April 1947 – 27 September 2016) was a Danish politician, academic and member of the Social Democrats. Buksti served as a member of the Folketing, or national Danish Parliament, from 1994 until 2005. From 2000 to 2001, he also served in the Poul Nyrup Rasmussen IV Cabinet as Minister of Transport. Additionally, Buksti was the spokesperson for the Social Democratic Party of Denmark from 1998 to 2000.

Buksti was educated at the Aarhus University and became a member of the Social Democrats early in his life.

He became an associate professor at the Danish Institute for Study Abroad (DIS) beginning in 2003.

Jacob Buksti died on 27 September 2016 at the age of 69, following a long illness.
