= Svend Aage Jensby =

Danish politician

Svend Aage Jensby (born 10 September 1940) is a Danish politician representing the Liberal Party. He was Defence Minister in the Cabinet of Anders Fogh Rasmussen I from 27 November 2001 to 24 April 2004, when he was forced to resign and was replaced by Søren Gade. He was a member of parliament (Folketinget) from 12 December 1990 to February 2005.

Political offices
Preceded by Jan Trøjborg	Defence Minister of Denmark; 27 November 2001 – 24 April 2004	Succeeded by Søren Gade
