= Charlotte Antonsen =

Danish politician (born 1959)

Member of the Folketing
- In office 12 December 1990 – 13 November 2007
- Constituency: North Zealand

Personal details
- Born: 9 January 1959 (age 66); Copenhagen, Denmark
- Political party: Venstre
- Spouse: Micheal Christiansen
- Education: University of Copenhagen

Minna Charlotte la Cour Antonsen (born 9 January 1959) is a Danish politician who served as Member of the Folketing for the North Zealand constituency under the Liberal party from 1990 to 2007.

== Life and political career ==
Antonsen was born on 9 January 1959 in Copenhagen, the daughter of director and former Member of the Folketing Poul Antonsen MSc (economics) and school teacher Johanne Charlotte Dornonville La Cour Antonsen MA.

Antonsen married to deputy superintendent, Michael Christiansen. The couple has two children.

She has been politically active since she joined Moderate Students at the University of Copenhagen in 1978, where she later became chairman of the organization and was also elected to the board of the university (Consistorium). In the Folketing with constituency in North Zealand, i.a. Birkerød from 1990 to 2007.

She also work with politics in her own communications company where she is owner and director of CACommunications. Antonsen is now standing for the municipal elections for the Liberal Party in the Rudersdal Municipality.
