= Ministry of Transport (Denmark) =

Government ministry of Denmark

Danish Ministry of Transport

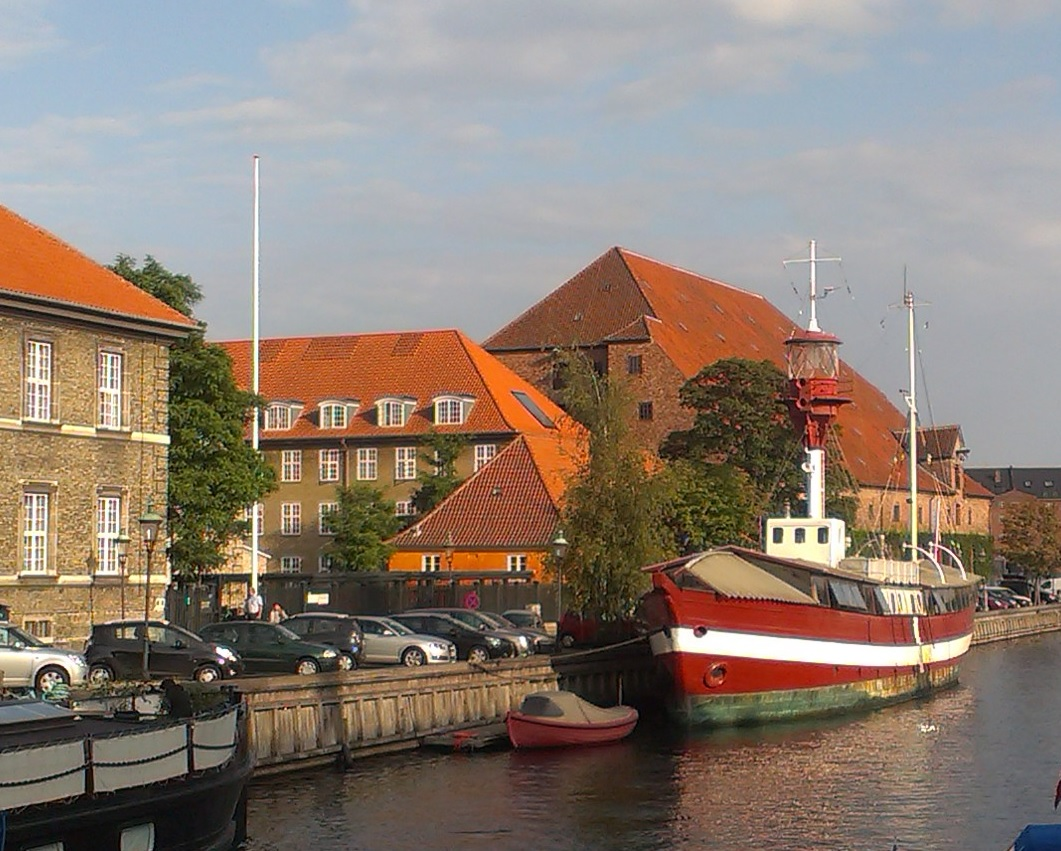

Department overview
- Formed: 1892
- Preceding Department: Ministry of Interior
- Jurisdiction: Kingdom of Denmark
- Headquarters: Copenhagen
- Employees: 135
- Annual budget: €18.77 million (current)
- Department executives: Thomas Danielsen MP, Minister for Transport; Jakob Heinsen, Permanent Secretary
- Website: www.trm.dk/en

The Danish Ministry of Transport (Danish: Transportministeriet) is the Danish ministry in charge of coordinating and realizing the transport politics of Denmark.

The Ministry is headed by a Permanent Secretary. The Ministry of Transport employs approximately 140 staff. The daily administration and handling of tasks and assignments on transport are carried out by a number of institutions, executive agencies, corporations, councils and boards. Counting every institution and every corporation the Ministry employs around 40.000 people

== History ==
The Ministry of Transport was founded in 1892 under the name Ministry for Public Works ("Ministeriet for offentlige Arbejder"). In 1987 it changed name to Ministry of Traffic ("Trafikministeriet"), though briefly known as Ministry of Traffic and Communication ("Trafik- og Kommunikationsministeriet") during 1988 to 1989. In 2005 the energy sector was detached from Ministry of the Environment and attached to the Ministry of Traffic. In turn, the name was changed to Ministry of Transport and Energy; the energy department was transferred to what is now known as the Danish Ministry of Climate and Energy in 2007.

== Agencies and Subsidiaries ==
The Ministry of Transport is the ressort ministry for these agencies:

- Banedanmark – Agency for Railway infrastructure
- Bygningsstyrelsen – Building and Property Agency
- Færdselsstyrelsen – Road Traffic Authority
- Accident Investigation Board Denmark
- Trafikstyrelsen – Civil Aviation and Railway Authority
- Vejdirektoratet – Danish Road Directorate

The Ministry also maintains state ownership of these state-owned companies:

Company	Ownership	Nationality
Sund & Bælt Holding A/S	100%	Denmark
DSB	100%	Denmark
Naviair	100%	Denmark
Metroselskabet I/S (Copenhagen Metro)	41.7%	Denmark
PostNord	40%	Sweden
By & Havn	5%	Denmark

== See also ==
- Wind power in Denmark
