= Poul Nødgaard =

Danish politician (1936–2013)

Member of the Folketing
- In office 12 December 1990 – 13 November 2007

Personal details
- Born: 29 November 1936; Vibe, Denmark
- Died: 24 September 2013 (aged 76); Ringsted, Denmark
- Political party: Danish People's Party (before 1995 Progress Party)
- Children: 2

Poul Enevold Nødgaard (Vibe, 29 November 1936 – Ringsted, 24 September 2013) was a Danish politician who served as Member of the Folketing from 1990 until 2007. He served as Deputy Mayor of the Ringsted Municipality from 1990 to 1994. He was one of the founders of the Danish People's Party.

== Life and political career ==
Poul Enevold Nødgaard was born on November 29, 1936, in Vive Parish, son of hotel-owner Christian Nødgaard and hotel-owner Agathe Nødgaard.

As early as 1953, he took his municipal training in Volstrup Municipality and advanced to kæmner, the then answer to a municipal director, in Vigersted Municipality from 1957 until 1970, when he moved to Ringsted Municipality as dispatch secretary.

In the Folketing he was deputy chairman of the municipal committee for eight years, also after he together with three other members of the Folketing founded the Danish People's Party in 1995, and from the change of government in 2001 until 2007 he was chairman of the Folketing's municipal committee. Before this he was a candidate for the Progress Party from 1990 until 1995, where he was first elected as a Member of the Folketing in the 1990 Danish general election under the party. He was Deputy Mayor of Ringsted Municipality from 1990 until 1994.

In 2007, he retired from national politics and dedicated his efforts to city council work. He helped secure the Danish People's Party in 2009 a historic increase from 10.8% to 14.1% in Ringsted Municipality in the municipal elections in 2009.

Nødgaard died at his home in Ringsted during a break between two meetings in 2013, aged 76. Erik Nielsen and Erik Fabrin, KL, wrote memorial words for the Danish People's Party's Poul Nødgaard.
