= Poul Andersen (politician) =

Danish politician (1952–2025)

Member of the Folketing
- In office 12 December 1990 – 15 September 2011

Personal details
- Born: 1 December 1952 Odense, Denmark
- Died: 8 December 2025 (aged 73)
- Party: S
- Occupation: Technician

Poul Andersen (1 December 1952 – 8 December 2025) was a Danish politician. A member of the Social Democrats, he served in the Folketing from 1990 to 2011.

Andersen died on 8 December 2025, at the age of 73.
