= Bjørn Westh =

Danish politician (born 1944)

Bjørn Westh (born 1944) is a Danish politician from the Social Democrats. He held several cabinet posts in the 1980s and 1990s.

== Early life and education ==
Westh was born in Overlade Parish on 2 February 1944, and his parents are Hans Rømer Westh, a headmaster, and Ingrid Westh, a kindergarten teacher.

In 1969 Westh received a degree in land inspection from the Royal Veterinary and Agricultural University. During his studies he was close to Liberal Centre, but when the party was closed Westh joined the Social Democrats.

== Career ==
Following graduation Westh worked as an assistant land surveyor in a town planning company in Viborg from 1972 to 1981.

Westh was first elected to the Danish Parliament for the Social Democrats representing Viborg County on 15 February 1977. He served as a temporary deputy between 1998 and 2004. He held various ministerial posts in the period 1981–1998: minister of agriculture (20 January 1981–10 September 1982; 25 January 1993–27 September 1994); minister of fisheries (25 January 1993–27 September 1994); minister of justice (27 September 1994–30 December 1996) and minister of transport (30 December 1996–23 March 1998).

Westh replaced Kent Kirk as minister of fisheries in January 1993. Westh's successor as minister of fisheries was Henrik Dam Kristensen who was appointed to the post in September 1994.

From 1999 to 2002 Westh was the European Union adviser to the Lithuanian Ministry of Agriculture. Until 2006 he was a member of Viborg County Council. Westh also ran for the office in the local elections for the Social Democrats in 2017, but he did not win the seat.

== Personal life ==
Westh married Grete Laustsen, a ceramicist, in Skals on 28 December 1967.
