= List of members of the Folketing, 1988–1990 =

61st Folketing
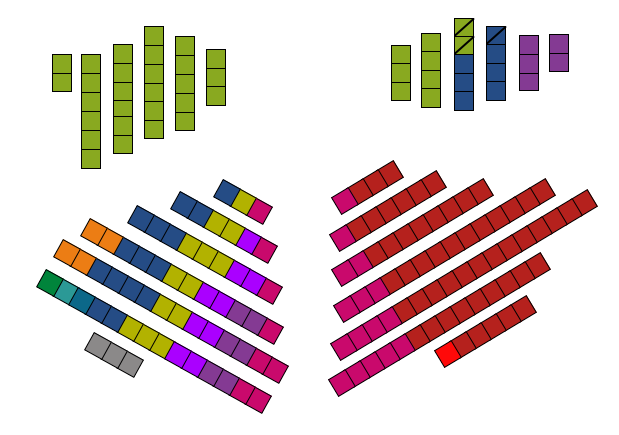
- Term: 10 May 1988 – 12 December 1990
- Speaker: A Svend Jakobsen (until 1989); C Erik Ninn-Hansen (1989); C H. P. Clausen (from 1989)
- Prime Minister: C Poul Schlüter
- Cabinet: Schlüter III
- Previous: 1987–1988
- Next: 1990–1994

This is a list of the 179 members of the Folketing, in the 1988 to 1990 session. They were elected at the 1988 general election.

== Election results ==
Denmark
Party	Votes	%	Seats	+/–
Social Democratic Party	992,682	29.8	55	+1
Conservative People's Party	642,048	19.3	35	−3
Socialist People's Party	433,261	13.0	24	−3
Venstre	394,190	11.8	22	+3
Progress Party	298,132	9.0	16	+7
Danish Social Liberal Party	185,707	5.6	10	−1
Centre Democrats	155,464	4.7	9	0
Christian People's Party	68,047	2.0	4	0
Common Course	63,263	1.9	0	−4
De Grønne	44,960	1.4	0	0
Communist Party of Denmark	27,439	0.8	0	0
Left Socialists	20,303	0.6	0	0
Independents	3,633	0.1	0	0
Invalid/blank votes	23,522	–	–	–
Total	3,352,651	100	175	0
Faroe Islands
People's Party	5,655	24.7	1	0
Union Party	5,597	24.4	1	+1
Social Democratic Party	4,861	21.2	0	−1
Republican Party	4,690	20.5	0	0
Self-Government Party	897	3.9	0	0
Christian People's Party	891	3.9	0	0
Progress Party	321	1.4	0	0
Invalid/blank votes	100	–	–	–
Total	23,012	100	2	0
Greenland
Siumut	8,415	40.1	1	0
Atassut	8,135	38.7	1	0
Inuit Ataqatigiit	3,628	17.3	0	0
Polar Party	821	3.9	0	0
Invalid/blank votes	1,169	–	–	–
Total	22,168	100	2	0
Source: Nohlen & Stöver

== Seat distribution ==
Below is the distribution of the 179 seats as it appeared after the 1988 election, as well at the distribution at the end of the term.

Party	Party leader	Elected seats	End seats	Change
A Social Democrats	Svend Auken	55	55	Steady
B Social Liberal Party	Niels Helveg Petersen	10	11	▲1
C Conservatives	Poul Schlüter	35	35	Steady
D Centre Democrats	Mimi Jakobsen	9	9	Steady
F Socialist People's Party	Gert Petersen	24	24	Steady
Q Christian People's Party	Flemming Kofod-Svendsen	4	4	Steady
V Liberals	Uffe Ellemann-Jensen	22	21	▼1
Z Progress Party	Pia Kjærsgaard	16	13	▼3
FF People's Party	Jógvan Sundstein	1	1	Steady
SP Union Party	Pauli Ellefsen	1	1	Steady
AT Feeling of Community	Konrad Steenholdt	1	1	Steady
SI Forward	Jonathan Motzfeldt	1	1	Steady
. Outside group		–	3	▲3

== Parliament members elected at the May 1988 election ==
Name	Birth year	Party	Constituency
Asbjørn Agerschou	1948	F Socialist People's Party	Ribe
Niels Ahlmann-Ohlsen	1953	C Conservatives	Nordjylland
Carsten Andersen	1940	F Socialist People's Party	Østre
Hanne Andersen	1939	A Social Democrats	København
Henning Andersen	1931	C Conservatives	Fyn
Jytte Andersen	1942	A Social Democrats	Østre
Svend Andersen	1929	A Social Democrats	Bornholm
Elisabeth Arnold	1941	B Social Liberal Party	Århus
Margrete Auken	1945	F Socialist People's Party	Frederiksborg
Svend Auken	1943	A Social Democrats	Århus
Kai Dige Bach	1936	C Conservatives	København
Børge Bakholt	1935	A Social Democrats	Fyn
Kim Behnke	1960	Z Progress Party	Århus
Helen Beim	1943	A Social Democrats	Roskilde
Dorte Bennedsen	1938	A Social Democrats	København
Jens Bilgrav-Nielsen	1936	B Social Liberal Party	Vejle
Ritt Bjerregaard	1941	A Social Democrats	Fyn
Niels Bollmann	1939	D Centre Democrats	Vejle
Óli Breckmann	1948	FF People's Party	Faroe Islands
Aage Brusgaard	1947	Z Progress Party	Viborg
Povl Brøndsted	1924	V Liberals	Fyn
Hans Peter Baadsgaard	1937	A Social Democrats	Århus
Christian Christensen	1925	Q Christian People's Party	Ringkøbing
Erling Christensen	1942	A Social Democrats	Fyn
Frode Nør Christensen	1948	D Centre Democrats	Ringkøbing
Pia Christmas-Møller	1961	C Conservatives	Vejle
Hans Peter Clausen	1928	C Conservatives	Nordjylland
Bernt Johan Collet	1941	C Conservatives	Storstrøm
Inge Dahl-Sørensen	1947	V Liberals	Østre
Pia Dahl	1953	Z Progress Party	Frederiksborg
Helle Degn	1946	A Social Democrats	København
Tommy Dinesen	1939	F Socialist People's Party	Vestsjælland
Helge Dohrmann	1939	Z Progress Party	Sønderjylland
Peter Duetoft	1950	D Centre Democrats	Nordjylland
Lone Dybkjær	1940	B Social Liberal Party	København
Pauli Ellefsen	1936	SP Union Party	Faroe Islands
Uffe Ellemann-Jensen	1941	V Liberals	Århus
Bjørn Elmquist	1938	V Liberals	Nordjylland
Mogens Elvensø	1922	Z Progress Party	Vestsjælland
Hans Engell	1948	C Conservatives	Vestsjælland
Knud Enggaard	1929	V Liberals	Århus
Ole Espersen	1934	A Social Democrats	Østre
Jørgen Estrup	1942	B Social Liberal Party	Østre
Viggo Fischer	1943	C Conservatives	Roskilde
Pernille Forchhammer	1967	A Social Democrats	Århus
Aage Frandsen	1941	F Socialist People's Party	Århus
Steen Gade	1945	F Socialist People's Party	Ringkøbing
Lars P. Gammelgaard	1945	C Conservatives	Århus
Pia Gjellerup	1959	A Social Democrats	Vestre
Mogens Glistrup	1926	Z Progress Party	København
Knud Glønborg	1930	Q Christian People's Party	Nordjylland
Holger Graversen	1936	A Social Democrats	Nordjylland
Henning Grove	1932	C Conservatives	Viborg
Lilli Gyldenkilde	1936	F Socialist People's Party	Vejle
Anna-Marie Hansen	1943	A Social Democrats	Viborg
Birthe Hansen	1930	F Socialist People's Party	Storstrøm
Flemming Hansen	1939	C Conservatives	Vejle
Ivar Hansen	1938	V Liberals	Ribe
Jens Kristian Hansen	1926	A Social Democrats	Sønderjylland
Søren Hansen	1942	A Social Democrats	Vestsjælland
Inger Harms	1942	F Socialist People's Party	Sønderjylland
Connie Hedegaard	1960	C Conservatives	København
Svend Heiselberg	1935	V Liberals	Viborg
Ole Henriksen	1934	F Socialist People's Party	København
Ole Bernt Henriksen	1934	C Conservatives	Århus
Leif Hermann	1941	F Socialist People's Party	Viborg
Jytte Hilden	1942	A Social Democrats	Vestsjælland
Karl Hjortnæs	1934	A Social Democrats	Århus
Lis Noer Holmberg	1930	D Centre Democrats	Fyn
Erik Holst	1922	A Social Democrats	Storstrøm
Svend Erik Hovmand	1945	V Liberals	Storstrøm
Birgitte Husmark	1945	F Socialist People's Party	Frederiksborg
Hans Hækkerup	1945	A Social Democrats	Vestsjælland
Klaus Hækkerup	1943	A Social Democrats	Frederiksborg
Bertel Haarder	1944	V Liberals	København
Kaj Ikast	1935	C Conservatives	Sønderjylland
Hanne Thanning Jacobsen	1936	F Socialist People's Party	Fyn
Kirsten Jacobsen	1942	Z Progress Party	Nordjylland
Erhard Jakobsen	1917	D Centre Democrats	Frederiksborg
Mimi Jakobsen	1948	D Centre Democrats	København
Svend Jakobsen	1935	A Social Democrats	København
Marianne Jelved	1943	B Social Liberal Party	Roskilde
Arne Jensen	1938	A Social Democrats	Nordjylland
Flemming Jensen	1928	C Conservatives	København
Frank Jensen	1961	A Social Democrats	Nordjylland
Jens Peter Jensen	1922	V Liberals	Fyn
Karen Højte Jensen	1938	C Conservatives	Roskilde
Ole Vig Jensen	1936	B Social Liberal Party	Vestsjælland
Bente Juncker	1944	D Centre Democrats	Østre
Annette Just	1947	Z Progress Party	Vejle
Anker Jørgensen	1922	A Social Democrats	Vestre
Jørgen Jørgensen	1929	Z Progress Party	Fyn
Poul Qvist Jørgensen	1941	A Social Democrats	Sønderjylland
Søren Bødker Jørgensen	1926	A Social Democrats	Århus
Christian Kelm-Hansen	1925	A Social Democrats	Århus
Kent Kirk	1948	C Conservatives	Ribe
Knud Erik Kirkegaard	1942	C Conservatives	Ringkøbing
Ingrid Kjældgaard	1921	Z Progress Party	Østre
Pia Kjærsgaard	1947	Z Progress Party	Fyn
Jens Risgaard Knudsen	1925	A Social Democrats	Nordjylland
Elsebeth Kock-Petersen	1949	V Liberals	Vestsjælland
Ingerlise Koefoed	1922	F Socialist People's Party	København
Flemming Kofod-Svendsen	1944	Q Christian People's Party	København
Niels Anker Kofoed	1929	V Liberals	Bornholm
Hans Larsen-Ledet	1921	B Social Liberal Party	Nordjylland
Tove Lindbo Larsen	1928	A Social Democrats	Søndre
Agnete Laustsen	1935	C Conservatives	Søndre
Kirsten Lee	1941	B Social Liberal Party	Viborg
Lizzie Lichtenberg	1937	C Conservatives	Vestsjælland
Knud Lind	1940	Z Progress Party	Storstrøm
Torben Lund	1950	A Social Democrats	Vejle
Jes Lunde	1956	F Socialist People's Party	Nordjylland
Mogens Lykketoft	1946	A Social Democrats	København
Lissa Mathiasen	1948	A Social Democrats	Århus
Christian Mejdahl	1939	V Liberals	Nordjylland
Arne Melchior	1924	D Centre Democrats	Århus
Helge Mortensen	1941	A Social Democrats	Ribe
Eva Møller	1940	C Conservatives	Frederiksborg
Grethe Fenger Møller	1941	C Conservatives	Østre
Helge Adam Møller	1942	C Conservatives	Storstrøm
Kjeld Rahbæk Møller	1938	F Socialist People's Party	Søndre
Lone Møller	1949	A Social Democrats	Frederiksborg
Per Stig Møller	1942	C Conservatives	Vestre
Henning Nielsen	1932	A Social Democrats	Ringkøbing
Holger K. Nielsen	1950	F Socialist People's Party	København
Poul Nielson	1943	A Social Democrats	Vejle
Tove Niemann	1934	Z Progress Party	Roskilde
Erik Ninn-Hansen	1922	C Conservatives	Fyn
Ivar Nørgaard	1922	A Social Democrats	København
Jane Oksen	1940	Z Progress Party	Ringkøbing
Aase Olesen	1934	B Social Liberal Party	Frederiksborg
Erling Olsen	1927	A Social Democrats	Østre
Inger Stilling Pedersen	1929	Q Christian People's Party	Århus
Thor Pedersen	1945	V Liberals	Frederiksborg
Gert Petersen	1927	F Socialist People's Party	Østre
Niels Helveg Petersen	1939	B Social Liberal Party	Fyn
Jette Pors	1941	D Centre Democrats	Roskilde
Bjørn Poulsen	1940	F Socialist People's Party	Nordjylland
Kaj Poulsen	1945	A Social Democrats	Nordjylland
Kristen Poulsgaard	1935	Z Progress Party	Nordjylland
Anders Fogh Rasmussen	1953	V Liberals	Viborg
Henning Rasmussen	1926	A Social Democrats	Ribe
Ingrid Rasmussen	1947	A Social Democrats	Storstrøm
Poul Nyrup Rasmussen	1943	A Social Democrats	Ringkøbing
Søren Riishøj	1947	F Socialist People's Party	Roskilde
Hans-Pavia Rosing	1948	SI Forward	Greenland
Jens Peter Rønholt	1939	C Conservatives	Sønderjylland
Pernille Sams	1959	C Conservatives	Århus
Helge Sander	1950	V Liberals	Ringkøbing
Poul Schlüter	1929	C Conservatives	København
Ernst Bundgaard Schmidt	1924	Z Progress Party	Ribe
Grete Schødts	1945	A Social Democrats	Fyn
Hanne Severinsen	1944	V Liberals	Ringkøbing
Palle Simonsen	1933	C Conservatives	Frederiksborg
Jens Skrumsager Skau	1943	V Liberals	Vejle
Laue Traberg Smidt	1944	V Liberals	Vejle
Erik Brünnich Smith	1939	A Social Democrats	Storstrøm
Jimmy Stahr	1935	A Social Democrats	Roskilde
Ole Stavad	1949	A Social Democrats	Nordjylland
Otto Steenholdt	1936	AT Feeling of Community	Greenland
Kaj Stillinger	1943	F Socialist People's Party	Fyn
Ebba Strange	1929	F Socialist People's Party	Århus
Hans Strunge	1940	A Social Democrats	Frederiksborg
Poul Søgaard	1923	A Social Democrats	Fyn
Peder Sønderby	1932	V Liberals	Sønderjylland
Else Theill Sørensen	1941	C Conservatives	Viborg
Jens Thoft	1945	F Socialist People's Party	Århus
Jette Thomsen	1942	C Conservatives	Nordjylland
Jan Trøjborg	1955	A Social Democrats	Vejle
Laurits Tørnæs	1936	V Liberals	Ribe
Svend Taanquist	1930	A Social Democrats	Sønderjylland
Pelle Voigt	1950	F Socialist People's Party	Vestre
Birte Weiss	1941	A Social Democrats	Søndre
Bjørn Westh	1944	A Social Democrats	Viborg
Nils Wilhjelm	1936	C Conservatives	Frederiksborg
Jørgen Winther	1945	V Liberals	Århus
Knud Østergaard	1922	C Conservatives	Ringkøbing
Christian Aagaard	1937	C Conservatives	Århus
Merete Aarup	1934	C Conservatives	Fyn

== Party and member changes after the May 1988 elections ==
=== Party changes ===
Below are all parliament members that have joined another party or become independent during the term.

Name	Old party	Constituency	New party	Date
Hugo Holm	Z Progress Party	Fyn	. Independent	10 January 1990
Hugo Holm	. Independent	Fyn	V Liberals	2 November 1990
Bjørn Elmquist	V Liberals	Nordjylland	. Independent	5 May 1990
Bjørn Elmquist	. Independent	Nordjylland	B Social Liberal Party	12 November 1990
Mogens Elvensø	Z Progress Party	Vestsjælland	. Independent	13 November 1990
Mogens Glistrup	Z Progress Party	København	. Independent	13 November 1990
Jane Oksen	Z Progress Party	Ringkøbing	. Independent	13 November 1990

=== Lasting member changes ===
Below are member changes that lasted through the entire term.

Replacement	Birth year	Party	Constituency	Replaced MP	Date	Reason
Henning Lysholm Christensen	1941	Q Christian People's Party	Ringkøbing	Christian Christensen	1 October 1988	Christensen died.
Hugo Holm	1956	Z Progress Party	Fyn	Jørgen Jørgensen	26 January 1989	Jørgensen resigned his seat.
Hans Jørgen Jensen	1929	A Social Democrats	København	Svend Jakobsen	1 February 1989	Jakobsen resigned his seat.
Sonja Albrink	1948	D Centre Democrats	Vejle	Niels Bollmann	17 May 1989	Bollmann died.
Jan Køpke Christensen	1955	Z Progress Party	Sønderjylland	Helge Dohrmann	20 September 1989	Dohrmann died.
Peter Sterup	1949	C Conservatives	Frederiksborg	Palle Simonsen	14 November 1989	Simonsen resigned his seat.
Annelise Gotfredsen	1928	C Conservatives	Frederiksborg	Nils Wilhjelm	12 December 1989	Wilhjelm resigned his seat.
Anders Mølgaard Jensen	1958	V Liberals	Vejle	Laue Traberg Smidt	16 January 1990	Smidt resigned his seat.
Ole Løvig Simonsen	1935	A Social Democrats	Frederiksborg	Hans Strunge	15 March 1990	Strunge resigned his seat.
Eva Fatum	1947	A Social Democrats	Bornholm	Svend Andersen	15 May 1990	Andersen died.
Klaus Bonde Larsen	1930	C Conservatives	København	Connie Hedegaard	4 October 1990	Hedegaard resigned her seat.
Gerda Thymann Pedersen	1942	C Conservatives	Nordjylland	Jette Thomsen	4 October 1990	Thomsen resigned her seat.
Poul Jensen	1930	Z Progress Party	Fyn	Hugo Holm	6 November 1990	Holm resigned his seat.

=== Temporary member changes ===
Below are temporary member replacements during the term.

Replacement	Birth year	Party	Constituency	Replaced MP	Start	End	Length
Lone Stig Andersen		F Socialist People's Party			9 June 1988	27 June 1988	18 days
Inger Marie Bruun-Vierø	1942	B Social Liberal Party	Østre	Jørgen Estrup	9 June 1988	26 June 1988	17 days
Søren Hedetoft		C Conservatives			9 June 1988	2 July 1988	23 days
Johannes Sørensen		Z Progress Party			9 June 1988	21 June 1988	12 days
Annebeth Runge Svendsen		V Liberals			16 June 1988	27 June 1988	11 days
Ove Fich		A Social Democrats			6 October 1988	1 November 1988	26 days
Liss Grooss		D Centre Democrats			6 October 1988	1 November 1988	26 days
Poul Henrik Houe		C Conservatives			6 October 1988	27 October 1988	21 days
Jørn Jespersen	1955	F Socialist People's Party	København	Ingerlise Koefoed	6 October 1988	31 October 1988	25 days
Lisbeth Petersen	1939	SP Union Party	Faroe Islands	Pauli Ellefsen	6 October 1988	20 October 1988	14 days
Henrik Toft		V Liberals			6 October 1988	29 October 1988	23 days
Hannah Kain		V Liberals			30 October 1988	6 December 1988	37 days
Ole Løvig Simonsen		A Social Democrats			1 November 1988	5 December 1988	34 days
Sven B. Nielsen		V Liberals			1 November 1988	16 November 1988	15 days
Johannes Sørensen		Z Progress Party			1 November 1988	6 December 1988	35 days
Lene Brandt Larsen		F Socialist People's Party			4 November 1988	3 December 1988	29 days
Lilian Nielsson		C Conservatives			9 November 1988	6 December 1988	27 days
Else Winther Andersen	1941	V Liberals	Århus	Uffe Ellemann-Jensen	29 November 1988	14 December 1988	15 days
Hugo Holm	1956	Z Progress Party	Fyn		1 December 1988	15 December 1988	14 days
Henrik Toft		V Liberals			13 December 1988	20 December 1988	7 days
Addi Andersen	1928	D Centre Democrats	Frederiksborg	Erhard Jakobsen	13 December 1988	20 December 1988	7 days
Peter Hvid Jensen		B Social Liberal Party			14 December 1988	20 December 1988	6 days
Johannes Martin Olsen	1933	SP Union Party	Faroe Islands	Pauli Ellefsen	14 December 1988	21 December 1988	7 days
Addi Andersen	1928	D Centre Democrats	Frederiksborg	Erhard Jakobsen	17 January 1989	24 January 1989	7 days
Addi Andersen	1928	D Centre Democrats	Frederiksborg	Erhard Jakobsen	14 February 1989	21 February 1989	7 days
Else Winther Andersen	1941	V Liberals	Århus	Uffe Ellemann-Jensen	7 March 1989	16 March 1989	9 days
Birger Christensen		Z Progress Party			13 March 1989	20 March 1989	7 days
Addi Andersen	1928	D Centre Democrats	Frederiksborg	Erhard Jakobsen	14 March 1989	21 March 1989	7 days
Mogens Camre	1936	A Social Democrats			28 March 1989	27 April 1989	30 days
Anna Lise Vesterby		V Liberals			4 April 1989	3 June 1989	60 days
Hans Kofoed		C Conservatives			11 April 1989	4 May 1989	23 days
Addi Andersen	1928	D Centre Democrats	Frederiksborg	Erhard Jakobsen	11 April 1989	18 April 1989	7 days
Alice Brask		C Conservatives			18 April 1989	4 May 1989	16 days
Sven B. Nielsen		V Liberals			18 April 1989	25 April 1989	7 days
Else Winther Andersen	1941	V Liberals	Århus	Uffe Ellemann-Jensen	18 April 1989	25 April 1989	7 days
Hannah Kain		V Liberals			16 May 1989	23 May 1989	7 days
Addi Andersen	1928	D Centre Democrats	Frederiksborg	Erhard Jakobsen	23 May 1989	30 May 1989	7 days
Peter Sterup		C Conservatives			25 May 1989	3 June 1989	9 days
Verner Jensen		Z Progress Party			5 October 1989	30 October 1989	25 days
Jørn Jespersen	1955	F Socialist People's Party	København	Ole Henriksen	5 October 1989	26 October 1989	21 days
Hannah Kain		V Liberals			5 October 1989	17 October 1989	12 days
Sonja Mikkelsen	1955	A Social Democrats			5 October 1989	30 October 1989	25 days
Lilian Nielsson		C Conservatives			5 October 1989	27 October 1989	22 days
Inge Tranholm-Mikkelsen		Q Christian People's Party			5 October 1989	28 October 1989	23 days
Herluf Rasmussen		D Centre Democrats			5 October 1989	4 December 1989	60 days
Addi Andersen	1928	D Centre Democrats	Frederiksborg	Erhard Jakobsen	24 October 1989	30 October 1989	6 days
Else Winther Andersen	1941	V Liberals	Århus	Uffe Ellemann-Jensen	24 October 1989	31 January 1990	99 days
Lone Stig Andersen		F Socialist People's Party			30 October 1989	3 December 1989	34 days
Jens Heimburger	1965	C Conservatives	Storstrøm	Bernt Johan Collet	30 October 1989	2 December 1989	33 days
Lis Greibe		A Social Democrats			31 October 1989	1 December 1989	31 days
Henrik Toft		V Liberals			31 October 1989	1 December 1989	31 days
Bjarne Ørum		B Social Liberal Party			31 October 1989	2 December 1989	32 days
Bodil Melgaard Haakonsen		D Centre Democrats			1 November 1989	4 December 1989	33 days
Søren Bastholm		D Centre Democrats			16 November 1989	27 November 1989	11 days
Addi Andersen	1928	D Centre Democrats	Frederiksborg	Erhard Jakobsen	21 November 1989	27 November 1989	6 days
Pia Larsen		V Liberals			23 November 1989	29 November 1989	6 days
Anna Lise Frølich		B Social Liberal Party			3 December 1989	10 December 1989	7 days
Annebeth Runge Svendsen		V Liberals			5 December 1989	15 December 1989	10 days
Søren Bastholm		D Centre Democrats			12 December 1989	18 December 1989	6 days
Sven B. Nielsen		V Liberals			12 December 1989	18 December 1989	6 days
Johannes Martin Olsen	1933	SP Union Party	Faroe Islands	Pauli Ellefsen	12 December 1989	18 December 1989	6 days
Addi Andersen	1928	D Centre Democrats	Frederiksborg	Erhard Jakobsen	12 December 1989	18 December 1989	6 days
Pia Larsen		V Liberals			13 December 1989	19 December 1989	6 days
Peter Hvid Jensen		B Social Liberal Party			15 December 1989	21 December 1989	6 days
Addi Andersen	1928	D Centre Democrats	Frederiksborg	Erhard Jakobsen	16 January 1990	22 January 1990	6 days
Erik Larsen		V Liberals			30 January 1990	8 February 1990	9 days
Else Winther Andersen	1941	V Liberals	Århus	Jørgen Winther	22 February 1990	28 February 1990	6 days
Søren Bastholm		D Centre Democrats			13 March 1990	19 March 1990	6 days
Pia Larsen		V Liberals			13 March 1990	19 March 1990	6 days
Addi Andersen	1928	D Centre Democrats	Frederiksborg	Erhard Jakobsen	13 March 1990	19 March 1990	6 days
Johannes Martin Olsen	1933	SP Union Party	Faroe Islands	Pauli Ellefsen	20 March 1990	29 March 1990	9 days
Gerda Thymann Pedersen		C Conservatives			22 March 1990	29 March 1990	7 days
Else Winther Andersen	1941	V Liberals	Århus	Uffe Ellemann-Jensen	22 March 1990	28 April 1990	37 days
Filt Jensen	1926	V Liberals	Sønderjylland	Peder Sønderby	3 April 1990	9 April 1990	6 days
Bodil Thrane		V Liberals			8 May 1990	14 May 1990	6 days
Else Winther Andersen	1941	V Liberals	Århus		8 May 1990	27 May 1990	19 days
Annebeth Runge Svendsen		V Liberals			8 May 1990	1 June 1990	24 days
Søren Bastholm		D Centre Democrats			15 May 1990	21 May 1990	6 days
Johannes Martin Olsen	1933	SP Union Party	Faroe Islands	Pauli Ellefsen	22 May 1990	31 May 1990	9 days
Anna Lise Vesterby		V Liberals			29 May 1990	4 June 1990	6 days
Lis Benfeldt		A Social Democrats			4 October 1990	29 October 1990	25 days
Anna Lise Vesterby		V Liberals			4 October 1990	26 October 1990	22 days
Inger Marie Bruun-Vierø		B Social Liberal Party			4 October 1990	28 October 1990	24 days
Ejner Larsen		F Socialist People's Party			4 October 1990	28 October 1990	24 days
Arne Nielsen		Q Christian People's Party			4 October 1990	28 October 1990	24 days
Svend Åge Petersen	1942	C Conservatives	Sønderjylland	Kaj Ikast	4 October 1990	28 October 1990	24 days
Addi Andersen	1928	D Centre Democrats	Frederiksborg	Erhard Jakobsen	9 October 1990	15 October 1990	6 days
Else Winther Andersen	1941	V Liberals	Århus	Uffe Ellemann-Jensen	23 October 1990	30 November 1990	38 days
Poul Emmert Andersen		D Centre Democrats			30 October 1990	23 November 1990	24 days
Ole Vagn Christensen		A Social Democrats			30 October 1990	23 November 1990	24 days
Johannes Martin Olsen	1933	SP Union Party	Faroe Islands	Pauli Ellefsen	30 October 1990	23 November 1990	24 days
Birte Lau Pedersen		F Socialist People's Party			30 October 1990	25 November 1990	26 days
Bo Kristensen		C Conservatives			5 November 1990	25 November 1990	20 days
Pia Larsen		V Liberals			8 November 1990	14 November 1990	6 days
Annebeth Runge Svendsen		V Liberals			20 November 1990	26 November 1990	6 days
Addi Andersen	1928	D Centre Democrats	Frederiksborg	Erhard Jakobsen	20 November 1990	26 November 1990	6 days
