= List of members of the Folketing, 1987–1988 =

60th Folketing
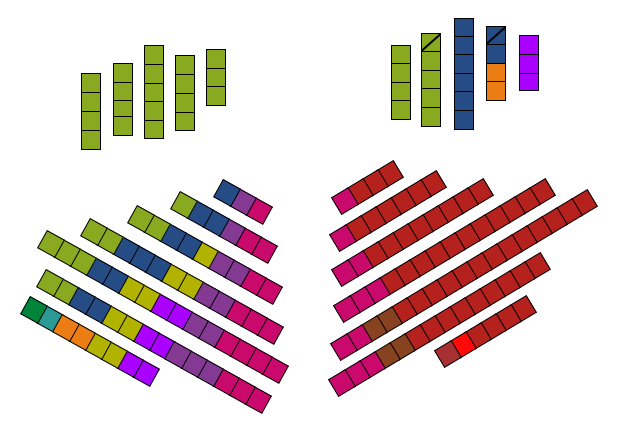
- Term: 8 September 1987 – 10 May 1988
- Speaker: A Svend Jakobsen
- Prime Minister: C Poul Schlüter
- Cabinet: Schlüter II
- Previous: 1984–1987
- Next: 1988–1990

This is a list of the 179 members of the Folketing, in the 1987 to 1988 session. They were elected at the 1987 general election.

== Election results ==
Party	Votes	%	Seats	+/–
Denmark
Social Democratic Party	985,906	29.3	54	−2
Conservative People's Party	700,886	20.8	38	−4
Socialist People's Party	490,176	14.6	27	+6
Venstre	354,291	10.5	19	−3
Danish Social Liberal Party	209,086	6.2	11	+1
Centre Democrats	161,070	4.8	9	+1
Progress Party	160,461	4.8	9	+3
Christian People's Party	79,664	2.4	4	−1
Common Course	72,631	2.2	4	New
Left Socialists	46,141	1.4	0	−5
De Grønne	45,076	1.3	0	New
Communist Party of Denmark	28,974	0.9	0	0
Justice Party of Denmark	16,359	0.5	0	0
Humanist Party	5,675	0.2	0	New
Socialist Workers Party	1,808	0.0	0	0
Communist Party of Denmark/Marxist–Leninists	987	0.0	0	0
Independents	3,366	0.1	0	0
Invalid/blank votes	26,644	–	–	–
Total	3,389,201	100	175	0
Faroe Islands
People's Party	6,411	28.8	1	0
Social Democratic Party	5,486	24.7	1	+1
Union Party	5,345	24.0	0	−1
Republican Party	3,478	15.6	0	0
Self-Government Party	1,070	4.8	0	0
Progress Party	438	2.0	0	New
Invalid/blank votes	157	–	–	–
Total	22,385	100	2	0
Greenland
Siumut	6,944	43.3	1	0
Atassut	6,627	41.3	1	0
Inuit Ataqatigiit	2,001	12.5	0	0
Polar Party	474	3.0	0	New
Invalid/blank votes	934	–	–	–
Total	16,980	100	2	0
Source: Nohlen & Stöver

== Seat distribution ==
Below is the distribution of the 179 seats as it appeared after the 1987 election, which was also the way it appeared at the end of the term.

Party	Party leader	Seats
A Social Democrats	Svend Auken	54
B Social Liberal Party	Niels Helveg Petersen	11
C Conservatives	Poul Schlüter	38
F Socialist People's Party	Gert Petersen	27
M Centre Democrats	Erhard Jakobsen	9
P Common Course	Preben Møller Hansen	4
Q Christian People's Party	Flemming Kofod-Svendsen	4
V Liberals	Uffe Ellemann-Jensen	19
Z Progress Party	Pia Kjærsgaard	9
JF Social Democratic Party	Atli Dam	1
FF People's Party	Jógvan Sundstein	1
AT Feeling of Community	Otto Steenholdt	1
SI Forward	Jonathan Motzfeldt	1

== Parliament members elected at the September 1987 election ==
Name	Birth year	Party	Constituency
Asbjørn Agerschou	1948	F Socialist People's Party	Ribe
Niels Ahlmann-Ohlsen	1953	C Conservatives	Nordjylland
Carsten Andersen	1940	F Socialist People's Party	Østre
Henning Andersen	1931	C Conservatives	Fyn
Jytte Andersen	1942	A Social Democrats	Østre
Poul Emmert Andersen	1938	M Centre Democrats	Roskilde
Svend Andersen	1929	A Social Democrats	Bornholm
Yvonne Herløv Andersen	1942	M Centre Democrats	Fyn
Margrete Auken	1945	F Socialist People's Party	Frederiksborg
Svend Auken	1943	A Social Democrats	Aarhus
Kai Dige Bach	1936	C Conservatives	København
Børge Bakholt	1935	A Social Democrats	Fyn
Bernhard Baunsgaard	1918	B Social Liberal Party	Aarhus
Kim Behnke	1960	Z Progress Party	Aarhus
Helen Beim	1943	A Social Democrats	Roskilde
Dorte Bennedsen	1938	A Social Democrats	København
Henrik Berlau	1953	P Common Course	Nordjylland
Jens Bilgrav-Nielsen	1936	B Social Liberal Party	Vejle
Ritt Bjerregaard	1941	A Social Democrats	Fyn
Niels Bollmann	1939	M Centre Democrats	Vejle
Óli Breckmann	1948	FF People's Party	Faroe Islands
Povl Brøndsted	1924	V Liberals	Fyn
Lasse Budtz	1926	A Social Democrats	Viborg
Hans Peter Baadsgaard	1937	A Social Democrats	Aarhus
Christian Christensen	1925	Q Christian People's Party	Ringkøbing
Erling Christensen	1942	A Social Democrats	Fyn
Frode Nør Christensen	1948	M Centre Democrats	Ringkøbing
Pia Christmas-Møller	1961	C Conservatives	Vejle
Hans Peter Clausen	1928	C Conservatives	Nordjyllands
Bernt Johan Collet	1941	C Conservatives	Storstrøm
Pia Dahl	1953	Z Progress Party	Frederiksborg
Atli Dam	1932	JF Social Democratic Party	Faroe Islands
Helle Degn	1946	A Social Democrats	København
Tommy Dinesen	1939	F Socialist People's Party	Vestsjælland
Helge Dohrmann	1939	Z Progress Party	Sønderjylland
Lone Dybkjær	1940	B Social Liberal Party	København
Uffe Ellemann-Jensen	1941	V Liberals	Aarhus
Bjørn Elmquist	1938	V Liberals	Nordjylland
Hans Engell	1948	C Conservatives	Vestsjælland
Knud Enggaard	1929	V Liberals	Aarhus
Ole Espersen	1934	A Social Democrats	Østre
Jørgen Estrup	1942	B Social Liberal Party	Østre
Viggo Fischer	1943	C Conservatives	Roskilde
Pernille Forchhammer	1967	A Social Democrats	Aarhus
Aage Frandsen	1941	F Socialist People's Party	Aarhus
Kurt Frederiksen	1947	P Common Course	Fyn
Steen Gade	1945	F Socialist People's Party	Ringkøbing
Lars P. Gammelgaard	1945	C Conservatives	Aarhus
Pia Gjellerup	1959	A Social Democrats	Vestre
Mogens Glistrup	1926	Z Progress Party	København
Knud Glønborg	1930	Q Christian People's Party	Nordjylland
Annelise Gotfredsen	1928	C Conservatives	København
Holger Graversen	1936	A Social Democrats	Nordjylland
Henning Grove	1932	C Conservatives	Viborg
Lilli Gyldenkilde	1936	F Socialist People's Party	Vejle
Hagen Hagensen	1916	C Conservatives	Vestre
Birthe Hansen	1930	F Socialist People's Party	Storstrøm
Flemming Hansen	1939	C Conservatives	Vejle
Ivar Hansen	1938	V Liberals	Ribe
Jens Kristian Hansen	1926	A Social Democrats	Sønderjylland
Preben Møller Hansen	1929	P Common Course	København
Søren Hansen	1942	A Social Democrats	Vestsjælland
Inger Harms	1942	F Socialist People's Party	Sønderjylland
Connie Hedegaard	1960	C Conservatives	København
Svend Heiselberg	1935	V Liberals	Viborg
Ole Henriksen	1934	F Socialist People's Party	København
Leif Hermann	1941	F Socialist People's Party	Viborg
Jytte Hilden	1942	A Social Democrats	Vestsjælland
Britta Schall Holberg	1941	V Liberals	Vejle
Erik Holst	1922	A Social Democrats	Storstrøm
Svend Erik Hovmand	1945	V Liberals	Storstrøm
Birgitte Husmark	1945	F Socialist People's Party	Frederiksborg
Hans Hækkerup	1945	A Social Democrats	Vestsjælland
Bertel Haarder	1944	V Liberals	København
Kaj Ikast	1935	C Conservatives	Sønderjylland
Hanne Thanning Jacobsen	1936	F Socialist People's Party	Fyn
Erhard Jakobsen	1917	M Centre Democrats	Frederiksborg
Mimi Jakobsen	1948	M Centre Democrats	København
Svend Jakobsen	1935	A Social Democrats	København
Marianne Jelved	1943	B Social Liberal Party	Roskilde
Arne Jensen	1938	A Social Democrats	Nordjylland
Dagmar Mørk Jensen	1924	B Social Liberal Party	Ringkøbing
Flemming Jensen	1928	C Conservatives	København
Frank Jensen	1961	A Social Democrats	Nordjylland
Karen Højte Jensen	1938	C Conservatives	Roskilde
Ole Vig Jensen	1936	B Social Liberal Party	Vestsjælland
Jørn Jespersen	1955	F Socialist People's Party	København
Bente Juncker	1944	M Centre Democrats	Østre
Annette Just	1947	Z Progress Party	Vejle
Anker Jørgensen	1922	A Social Democrats	Vestre
Poul Qvist Jørgensen	1941	A Social Democrats	Sønderjylland
Søren Bødker Jørgensen	1926	A Social Democrats	Aarhus
Christian Kelm-Hansen	1925	A Social Democrats	Aarhus
Kent Kirk	1948	C Conservatives	Ribe
Knud Erik Kirkegaard	1942	C Conservatives	Ringkøbing
Pia Kjærsgaard	1947	Z Progress Party	Fyn
Jens Risgaard Knudsen	1925	A Social Democrats	Nordjylland
Elsebeth Kock-Petersen	1949	V Liberals	Vestsjælland
Ingerlise Koefoed	1922	F Socialist People's Party	København
Flemming Kofod-Svendsen	1944	Q Christian People's Party	København
Niels Anker Kofoed	1929	V Liberals	Bornholm
Poul Erik Korneliusen	1942	A Social Democrats	Frederiksborg
Bo Kristensen	1945	C Conservatives	Vejle
Hans Larsen-Ledet	1921	B Social Liberal Party	Nordjylland
Ejner Larsen	1940	F Socialist People's Party	Fyn
Agnete Laustsen	1935	C Conservatives	Søndre
Kirsten Lee	1941	B Social Liberal Party	Viborg
Lizzie Lichtenberg	1937	C Conservatives	Vestsjælland
Torben Lund	1950	A Social Democrats	Vejle
Jes Lunde	1956	F Socialist People's Party	Nordjylland
Mogens Lykketoft	1946	A Social Democrats	København
Kirsten Madsen	1936	Z Progress Party	Østre
Lissa Mathiasen	1948	A Social Democrats	Aarhus
Christian Mejdahl	1939	V Liberals	Nordjylland
Arne Melchior	1924	M Centre Democrats	Aarhus
Sonja Mikkelsen	1955	A Social Democrats	Aarhus
Birgith Mogensen	1927	M Centre Democrats	Nordjylland
Helge Mortensen	1941	A Social Democrats	Ribe
Eva Møller	1940	C Conservatives	Frederiksborg
Grethe Fenger Møller	1941	C Conservatives	Østre
Helge Adam Møller	1942	C Conservatives	Storstrøm
Kjeld Rahbæk Møller	1938	F Socialist People's Party	Søndre
Lone Møller	1949	A Social Democrats	Frederiksborg
Per Stig Møller	1942	C Conservatives	København
Henning Nielsen	1932	A Social Democrats	Ringkøbing
Holger K. Nielsen	1950	F Socialist People's Party	København
Poul Nielson	1943	A Social Democrats	Vejle
Erik Ninn-Hansen	1922	C Conservatives	Fyn
Søren Nørgård-Sørensen	1952	A Social Democrats	Fyn
Ivar Nørgaard	1922	A Social Democrats	København
Jane Oksen	1940	Z Progress Party	Ringkøbing
Aase Olesen	1934	B Social Liberal Party	Frederiksborg
Erling Olsen	1927	A Social Democrats	Østre
Inger Stilling Pedersen	1929	Q Christian People's Party	Aarhus
Robert Pedersen	1921	A Social Democrats	Ringkøbing
Thor Pedersen	1945	V Liberals	Frederiksborg
Gert Petersen	1927	F Socialist People's Party	Østre
Niels Helveg Petersen	1939	B Social Liberal Party	Fyn
Svend Åge Petersen	1942	C Conservatives	Sønderjylland
Bjørn Poulsen	1940	F Socialist People's Party	Nordjylland
Kaj Poulsen	1945	A Social Democrats	Nordjylland
Kristen Poulsgaard	1935	Z Progress Party	Nordjylland
Anders Fogh Rasmussen	1953	V Liberals	Viborg
Henning Rasmussen	1926	A Social Democrats	Ribe
Ingrid Rasmussen	1947	A Social Democrats	Storstrøm
Søren Riishøj	1947	F Socialist People's Party	Roskilde
Hans-Pavia Rosing	1948	SI Forward	Greenland
Pernille Sams	1959	C Conservatives	Aarhus
Helge Sander	1950	V Liberals	Ringkøbing
Poul Schlüter	1929	C Conservatives	København
Palle Simonsen	1933	C Conservatives	Frederiksborg
Jens Skrumsager Skau	1943	V Liberals	Vejle
Erik Brünnich Smith	1939	A Social Democrats	Storstrøm
Jimmy Stahr	1935	A Social Democrats	Roskilde
Ole Stavad	1949	A Social Democrats	Nordjylland
Otto Steenholdt	1936	AT Feeling of Community	Greenland
Kaj Stillinger	1943	F Socialist People's Party	Fyn
Ebba Strange	1929	F Socialist People's Party	Aarhus
Hans Strunge	1940	A Social Democrats	Frederiksborg
Poul Søgaard	1923	A Social Democrats	Fyn
Bente Søltoft	1952	F Socialist People's Party	Søndre
Peder Sønderby	1932	V Liberals	Sønderjylland
Else Theill Sørensen	1941	C Conservatives	Viborg
Bernhardt Tastesen	1926	A Social Democrats	Vejle
Jens Thoft	1945	F Socialist People's Party	Aarhus
Jette Thomsen	1942	C Conservatives	Nordjylland
Henrik Toft	1934	V Liberals	Ringkøbing
Jan Trøjborg	1955	A Social Democrats	Vejle
Jørgen Tved	1932	P Common Course	Østre
Laurits Tørnæs	1936	V Liberals	Ribe
Svend Taanquist	1930	A Social Democrats	Sønderjylland
Pelle Voigt	1950	F Socialist People's Party	Vestre
Birte Weiss	1941	A Social Democrats	Søndre
Bjørn Westh	1944	A Social Democrats	Viborg
Nils Wilhjelm	1936	C Conservatives	Frederiksborg
Knud Østergaard	1922	C Conservatives	Ringkøbing
Christian Aagaard	1937	C Conservatives	Aarhus
Lis Aaltonen	1940	C Conservatives	Ribe
Merete Aarup	1934	C Conservatives	Fyn

== Party and member changes after the September 1987 elections ==
=== Lasting member changes ===
Below are member changes that lasted through the entire term.

Replacement	Birth year	Party	Constituency	Replaced MP	Date	Reason
Merethe Due Jensen	1943	Q Christian People's Party	København	Flemming Kofod-Svendsen	13 January 1988	Kofod-Svendsen resigned his seat.

=== Temporary member changes ===
Below are temporary member replacements during the term.

Replacement	Birth year	Party	Constituency	Replaced MP	Start	End	Length
Sonja Albrink	1948	M Centre Democrats	Vejle	Niels Bollmann	8 October 1987	3 November 1987	26 days
Erik Jakobsen		F Socialist People's Party			8 October 1987	3 November 1987	26 days
Jacob Lindenskov	1933	JF Social Democratic Party	Faroe Islands	Atli Dam	13 October 1987	10 May 1988	210 days
Jesper Fabricius		C Conservatives			3 November 1987	19 December 1987	46 days
Mette Groes		A Social Democrats			3 November 1987	18 December 1987	45 days
Anders Poulsen		V Liberals			3 November 1987	15 December 1987	42 days
Kristian R. Kristensen		Q Christian People's Party			9 November 1987	17 December 1987	38 days
Jørgen Winther	1945	V Liberals			10 November 1987	19 December 1987	39 days
Karl Hjortnæs	1934	A Social Democrats	Aarhus	Søren Bødker Jørgensen	10 December 1987	1 February 1988	53 days
Inger Marie Bruun-Vierø	1942	B Social Liberal Party	Østre	Jørgen Estrup	12 December 1987	19 December 1987	7 days
Hans Jørgen Holm		V Liberals			12 January 1988	10 May 1988	119 days
Ann-Carina Ingemann		P Common Course			13 January 1988	25 January 1988	12 days
Ib Jakobsen		P Common Course			13 January 1988	25 January 1988	12 days
Mette Madsen		V Liberals			25 January 1988	1 February 1988	7 days
