= Kirsten Jacobsen =

Danish politician (1942–2010)

Leader of the Progress Party
- In office 1995–1997

Member of the Folketing for the North Jutland County constituency
- In office 20 November 2001 – 10 May 1988
- In office 4 December 1973 – 7 December 1981

Personal details
- Born: Kirsten Larsen; 18 February 1942 Aalborg, Denmark
- Died: 2 December 2010 (aged 68) Copenhagen, Denmark
- Party: Progress Party (1972–1999); Freedom 2000 (1999–2001); Independent (2001); Conservative People's Party (2008–2010)
- Spouse(s): Niels Willum Wisbech Jacobsen (m. 1960; div. 1972) Erik Stormfelt (m. 1979; died 1997)
- Children: 3
- Occupation: Real estate agent
- Awards: Knight First Class of the Order of the Dannebrog

Kirsten Jacobsen (née Larsen; 18 February 1942 – 2 December 2010) was a Danish real estate agent and politician who was an elected member of the Folketing for the North Jutland County constituency for two non-consecutive periods from 1973 to 1981 and then between 1988 and 2001. She was first a member of the Progress Party, the Freedom 2000 Group an independent and The Conservative People's Party. Jacobsen was also a member of both the Parliamentary Assembly of the Council of Europe and the Nordic Council. She was leader of the Progress Party from 1995 to 1997. Jacobsen was appointed Knight of the Order of the Dannebrog in 1991 and was upgraded to Knight First Class of the Order of the Dannebrog five years later.

== Early life ==
On 18 February 1942, Jacobsen was born in Aalborg Hospital in Aalborg; she regularly maintained that she was born in Nørresundby. She was the third of five children of the dairy worker and depot manager Børge Larsen and Helene Bånd-Larsen. Jacobsen was raised in the family home, Nordenfjord at Nørresundby, where her father was custodian. She worked at her father's ice cream family as well as delivering their products and cared for her younger siblings after her mother fell ill. Jacobsen became a member of the Young Conservatives when she was 14 years old and was able to train as an authorised state real estate agent at an educational law firm in 1970. She also attended Aalborg Business School.

== Career ==
Jacobsen became a member of the newly founded Progress Party in 1972, and was elected to represent the North Jutland County constituency in the Folketing, a seat she held from 4 December 1973 to 7 December 1981. She was one of 28 Progress Party politicians to be elected to the Folketing. During her first term, she became a member of the Nordic Council between 1973 and 1981, and of the Parliamentary Assembly of the Council of Europe from 25 April 1977 to 21 April 1980, variously as a substitute and as a representative. Jacobsen was able to become deputy chair of Parliament's Housing Committee, the Political-Economic Committee as well as the Tax Committee due to her interest in those fields. She was deputy chair of Progress Party's parliamentary group between 1975 and 1976. Jacobsen resigned from the Folketing in 1981 because of ill health.

She moved to Oslo in 1982, but returned to Blokhus after four months. Jacobsen was re-elected to the Folketing again for the North Jutland County constituency in the 1988 Danish general election on 10 May. She returned to the Parliamentary Assembly of the Council of Europe for the period from 30 January 1989 to 1 January 1990, and returned to the Nordic Council as a deputy starting in 1990. Jacobsen felt she was ignored by the party leader Helge Dohrmann; she was group chair for one week, feeling unsuited to a leadership role. She was a political rapporteur for the financial sector and the Faroe Islands, a member of the Business Ministers' Idea Group regarding Real Estate Trading as well as of the Inter-Parliamentary Union and of the parliamentary inquiry committee regarding Spar Nord's purchase of Himmerlandsbanken in 1994. From 27 December 1990 to 1 October 1996, she was a member of the Bureau of the Folketing and became close friends with Lilli Gyldenkilde of the Socialist People's Party in the process, leading to the television programme Ask Lilli and Kirsten.

In 1995, Jacobsen was made leader of the Progress Party following the establishment of the Danish People's Party by Pia Kjærsgaard. She resigned the leadership in 1997 when her husband became quite unwell. At the 1998 Danish general election, her large number of personal votes was enough to allow the Progress Party to remain represented in the Folketing with two seats. The result was enough to make Jacobsen one of Denmark's top three voted on politicians. She notified the party's parliamentary group and her constituency in November 1998 that she would step down the following year to enable her to spend more time with her family and friends. When this was announced, Jacobsen and three other party members formed the Freedom 2000 group in protest of Mogens Glistrup returning to the Progress Party. She became an independent in February 2001 and left the Folketing at the 2001 Danish general election that 20 November.

During her career, Jacobsen established an alternative complaints centre that received 6,000 enquries per year from citizens. This enabled her to know what the population were thinking of. In 1998, she authored her biography, Kirsten. In it, Jacobsen says she did not join other parties while in parliament due to their higher levels of discipline. She was named Politician of the Year in 1993. Jacobsen became a member of The Conservative People's Party in 2008.

== Personal life ==
From 21 May 1960 to their divorce in 1972, she was married to the electric wholesaler Niels Willum Wisbech Jacobsen. They had three children. Jacobsen remarried to the Norwegian real estate agent Erik Stormfelt on 30 June 1979 and remained married until his death on 20 December 1997. She was appointed Knight of the Order of the Dannebrog in 1991 and was upgraded to Knight First Class of the Order of the Dannebrog five years later. Jacobsen died at a Copenhagen hospice on 2 December 2010.
