= Kristian Thulesen Dahl =

Danish director and former politician (born 1969)

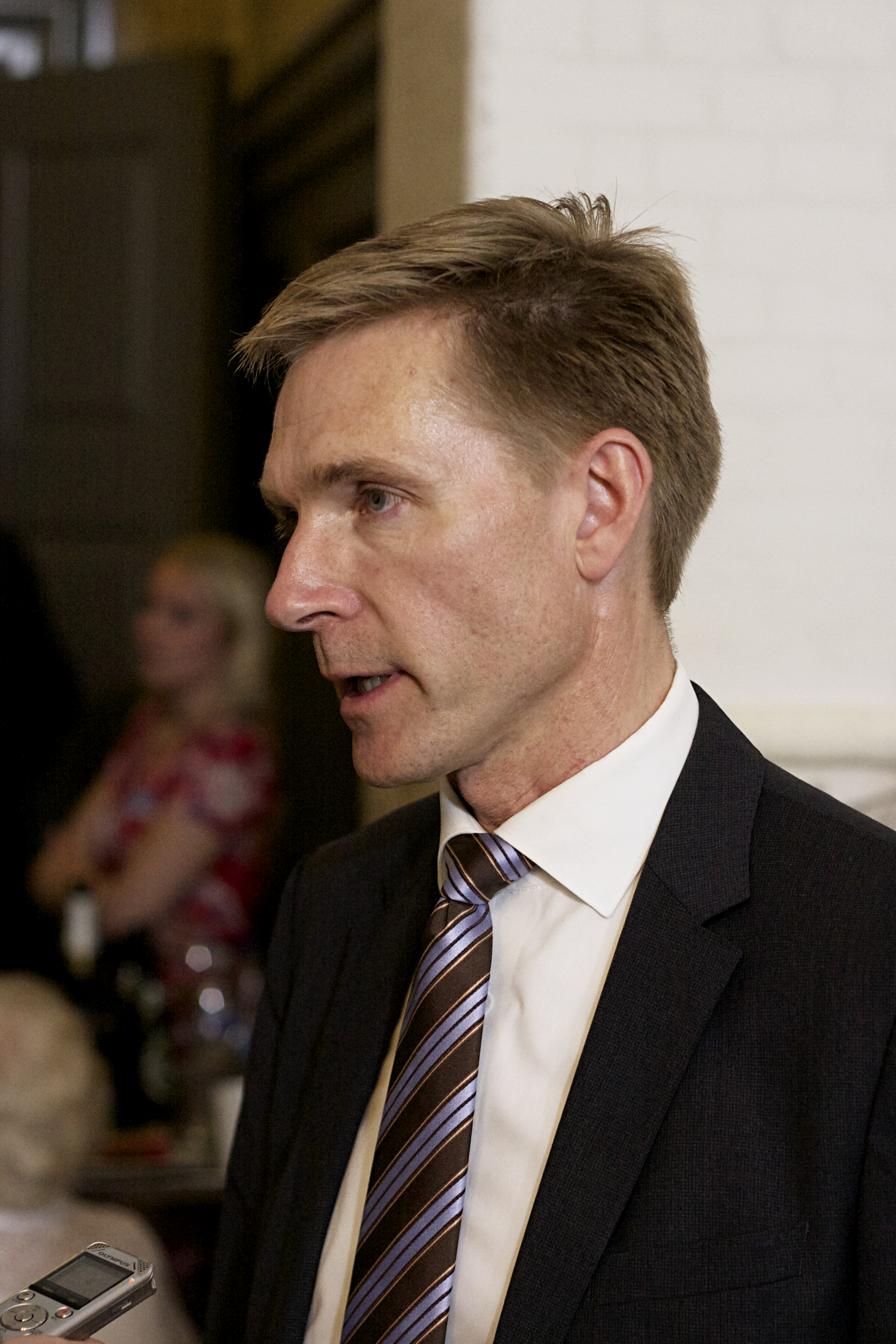

Leader of the Danish People's Party
- In office 12 September 2012 – 23 January 2022
- Preceded by: Pia Kjærsgaard
- Succeeded by: Morten Messerschmidt

Member of the Folketing
- In office 21 September 1994 – 31 July 2022
- Constituency: South Jutland; Fyn (1998-2011); Vejle (1994-1998)

Personal details
- Born: Kristian Thulesen Dahl; 30 July 1969 (age 57) Brædstrup, Denmark
- Party: Danish People's Party (until 2022); Progress Party (until 1995)
- Spouse(s): Berit Holmgaard Olesen (m. 2000)
- Children: 3
- Education: Aalborg University

Kristian Thulesen Dahl (born 30 July 1969) is a Danish director and former politician who served as Leader of the Danish People's Party (DPP) from 2012 to 2022. He was a Member of the Folketing (MF) from September 1994 until July 2022, first representing Fremskridtspartiet until 6 October 1995 and then the DPP from that date until 29 June 2022, when he became an independent.

He became leader of the Danish People's Party in 2012, following Pia Kjærsgaard's retirement from the post. He is a Knight of the Dannebrog.

Kristian Thulesen Dahl is also the brother of fellow MF Jens Henrik Thulesen Dahl.

== Political career ==
Thulesen Dahl's first period in parliament was as a temporary member from 7 October 1993 to 24 October 1993. Following this he ran in the 1994 Danish general election for the Progress Party. He was elected into parliament, but switched to the Danish People's Party during the term, on 6 October 1995. Thuelsen Dahl also entered the municipal council of Give Municipality from 1997 to 2006, and Vejle Municipality from 2006 to 2010.

In 2012, after Pia Kjærsgaard's resignment, he was elected chairman of the Danish People's Party. In 2014, a poll of Danish right wing voters showed that Thulesen Dahl was more popular as a possible candidate for Prime Minister than any other leader of the Danish right wing parties, including current Prime Minister Lars Løkke Rasmussen. He, however, did not consider himself a candidate for that post.

In the 2015 Danish general elections, Thulesen's first election as party leader, his party won 37 of 179 seats in parliament becoming the second largest party. Thulesen Dahl received more than 57,000 personal votes. While his party became the largest in the right wing bloc, and he was much more popular than Venstre's candidate for Prime Minister, Lars Løkke Rasmussen, he refused that he was in play as a possible Prime Minister of Denmark.

Thulesen did not stand in the 2022 Danish general election as he had gotten a job as the director of the port of Aalborg, his first job outside politics in 28 years.

== Positions ==
In 2013, Thulesen Dahl argued that Denmark to a larger extent should accept more refugees coming from non-Muslim countries and fewer from Muslim countries. In the same interview, he declared himself a supporter of freedom of religion, thus a Dane who wishes to convert to Islam is free to do so, however, he also stated that he believes that there is no room in Denmark for more people with a Muslim background.

== Honours and decorations ==
- Order of the Dannebrog, Knight 1st Class

Political offices
Preceded by Pia Kjærsgaard	Leader of the Danish People's Party; 2012–2022	Succeeded by Morten Messerschmidt
