= Erik Ninn-Hansen =

Danish politician (1922-2014)

Speaker of the Folketing
- In office 10 January 1989 – 3 October 1989
- Monarch: Margrethe II
- Preceded by: Svend Jakobsen
- Succeeded by: Hans Peter Clausen

Minister of Justice
- In office 10 September 1982 – 10 January 1989
- Prime Minister: Poul Schlüter
- Preceded by: Ole Espersen
- Succeeded by: Hans Peter Clausen

Minister of Finance
- In office 17 March 1971 – 11 October 1971
- Prime Minister: Hilmar Baunsgaard
- Preceded by: Poul Møller
- Succeeded by: Henry Grünbaum

Minister of Defence
- In office 2 February 1968 – 17 March 1971
- Prime Minister: Hilmar Baunsgaard
- Preceded by: Victor Gram
- Succeeded by: Knud Østergaard

Leader of the Conservative People's Party
- In office 1971–1974
- Preceded by: Poul Møller
- Succeeded by: Poul Schlüter

Member of the Folketing
- In office 21 April 1953 – 20 September 1994
- Constituency: Fyns (1971–1994); Sorø (1953–1971)

Personal details
- Born: 12 April 1922 Skørpinge, Denmark
- Died: 20 September 2014 (aged 92) Fredriksberg, Denmark
- Party: Conservative People's
- Spouse: Astrid Pedersen (m. 1947; died 2010)
- Children: 2

Erik Ninn-Hansen (12 April 1922 – 20 September 2014) was a Danish politician. He served in the Cabinet of Hilmar Baunsgaard, first as Defence Minister, and later as Finance Minister. In the early 1970s he became leader of the Conservative People's Party, but without much success, as the party slumped to its worst-ever results in the 1973 and 1975 elections.

== Tamil Case ==
In the 1980s cabinets of Poul Schlüter, Ninn-Hansen served as Justice Minister. It was from this position that he abused the powers vested in him by illegally stalling family reunion applications from relatives to Tamil refugees, known as the Tamil Case. When the story broke in 1989, Ninn-Hansen was forced to resign as cabinet minister. He served as Speaker of Parliament but, as the scope of the scandal increased, he was forced to resign this office as well. An independent inquiry headed by a Supreme Court Judge was set up to investigate the affair in the late 1980s. The resulting report of this committee led to the resignation of the Conservative-Liberal government in 1993.

Later that year, Ninn-Hansen became the first person since 1910 to be impeached for his behavior as a cabinet minister. In 1995 he was convicted on three charges of abuse of power, and was given a four months suspended prison sentence. The most important task in the impeachment process had been to establish responsibility for the affair. Ninn-Hansen's advanced age and poor health weighed against a full prison term.

An additional case of ministerial wrongdoing surfaced in 2007. Allegedly, Ninn-Hansen, then Minister of Justice, ordered that the ministry shelved requests to the French courts to have two Palestinian PFLP prisoners and 6 mio. DKK handed over to the Danish justice system, presumably out of fears for new acts of terror on Denmark. The two PFLP members were presumably connected the notorious Danish activists Blekingegadebanden and had been caught on 26 March 1984 trying to leave De Gaulle airport France with six million DKK in suitcases, on their way to Damascus. Earlier that month, on 2 March 1983, a Danish money transport had been robbed of 8.3 mio. DKK by Blekingegadebanden in Købmagergadekuppet, in which a young policeman was shot dead. Police officers responsible for the investigation were silenced by the Ministry of Justice and ordered to cease the investigation. Relevant files in the ministry of justice have routinely been destroyed, and Ninn-Hansen either cannot or will not recall any details. The author Peter Øvig Knudsen discovered correspondence between the French and Danish authorities in the files of the ministry of foreign affairs, as the communications had taken place under the auspices of that ministry. In 2008 an ongoing investigative commission of cold war affairs, the so-called PET-kommissionen, was asked also to report on this issue. In 2009 it concluded that both the French and Danish authorities mutually and silently had agreed not to prosecute the PLFP prisoners, but also that it was within the discretion of Ninn-Hansen to take such a decision and that he cannot be criticized. There have been several calls in parliament for a new in-depth investigation of this issue. He died at the age of 92 on 20 September 2014.

Political offices
Preceded by Victor Gram	Defence Minister of Denmark; 2 February 1968 – 17 March 1971	Succeeded by Knud Østergaard
Preceded by Poul Møller	Finance Minister of Denmark; 17 March 1971 – 11 October 1971	Succeeded by Henry Grünbaum
Preceded by Ole Espersen	Justice Minister of Denmark; 10 September 1982 – 10 January 1989	Succeeded by Hans Peter Clausen
Preceded by Svend Jakobsen	Speaker of the Folketing; January 10, 1989 – October 3, 1989	Succeeded by Hans Peter Clausen
Party political offices
Preceded by Poul Møller	Leader of the Conservative People's Party; 1971–1974	Succeeded by Poul Schlüter
