= Inger Stilling Pedersen =

Danish author and politician

Member of the Folketing
- In office 10 January 1984 – 21 September 1994
- Constituency: Århus
- In office 4 December 1973 – 22 October 1979
- Constituency: Århus

Personal details
- Born: 26 July 1929 Pindstrup, Denmark
- Died: 20 March 2017 (aged 87) Randers, Denmark
- Party: Christian People's Party

Inger Elisabeth Stilling Pedersen (26 July 1929 – 20 March 2017) was a Danish politician, who was a member of the Folketing for the Christian People's Party from 1973 to 1979 and again from 1984 to 1994.

== Background ==
Pedersen graduated as a teacher from Århus Seminarium in 1961, and worked as a teacher at Nyvangsskolen in Randers.

== Political career ==
Pedersen's first political work was as a member of the Parish council of Sankt Peder's Parish in Randers, where she sat from 1965 to 1978. Pedersen was elected into parliament at the 1973 Danish general election, and was reelected in 1975 and 1977. She did not get elected at the 1979 election. It wasn't until the 1984 election that she entered parliament again. She remained in parliament until 1994. After her parliamentary work she became a councillor in the parish council of Kristrup Parish near Randers, entering the council in 1996.

In 1988–1989, Pedersen was a part of a proposal to dismantle Freetown Christiania. The proposal was voted down in the Folketing with just 22 votes for (Christian People's Party, Centre Democrats and Progress Party) and 110 against.
