= List of speakers of the Folketing =

Speaker of the Folketing
- Folketingets formand (Danish)
- Seal of the Folketing

- State Flag of Denmark

- Incumbent; Henrik Frandsen since 6 October 2026
- Parliament of Denmark
- Style: Mr Speaker (informal)
- Member of: Presidium of the Danish Parliament
- Reports to: Monarch
- Residence: Christiansborg
- Seat: Copenhagen, Denmark
- Nominator: Prime Minister
- Appointer: Folketing
- Term length: No term limit
- Constituting instrument: Constitution of Denmark
- Formation: 3 January 1850; 176 years ago
- First holder: Carl Christoffer Georg Andræ
- Website: Official website

The speaker of the Folketing (Danish: Folketingets formand) is the presiding officer of the Danish Parliament, Folketing. It was established on 3 January 1850. The incumbent speaker is Henrik Frandsen who has been serving since 6 October 2026.

== List of speakers of the Danish Parliament ==
Below is a list of office-holders:

No.	Portrait	Name (born-died)	Term of office			Political party	Folketing	Ref.
No.	Portrait	Name (born-died)	Took office	Left office	Time in office	Political party	Folketing	Ref.
1		Carl Christoffer Georg Andræ (1812–1893)	30 January 1850	3 August 1852	2 years, 186 days	National Liberal	1st	
2		Johan Nicolai Madvig (1804–1886)	4 October 1852	12 June 1853	313 days	National Liberal	2nd	
3		Carl Edvard Rotwitt (1812–1860)	13 June 1853	2 December 1859	6 years, 172 days	Society of the Friends of Peasants	3rd 4th 5th 6th 7th	
4		Laurids Nørgaard Bregendahl (1811–1872)	3 December 1859	2 December 1870	10 years, 364 days	National Liberal	7th 8th 9th 10th 11th 12th 13th	
5		Christopher Krabbe (1833–1913)	3 December 1870	30 September 1883	12 years, 301 days	United Left	13th 14th 15th 16th 17th 18th 19th	
6		Christen Berg (1829–1891) (Note: Sofus Høgsbro, V was acting speaker from 25 January to 24 July 1886.)	1 October 1883	2 October 1887	4 years, 1 day	People's Left	19th 20th	
6		Christen Berg (1829–1891)	1 October 1883	2 October 1887	4 years, 1 day	Danish's Left	19th 20th	
7		Sofus Høgsbro (1822–1902)	3 October 1887	16 December 1894	7 years, 74 days	Negotiating Venstre	21st 22nd 23rd	
8		Rasmus Claussen (1835–1905)	17 December 1894	16 April 1895	120 days	Negotiating Venstre	23rd	
(7)		Sofus Høgsbro (1822–1902)	17 April 1895	4 October 1901	6 years, 170 days	Moderate Venstre	24th 25th	
9		Herman Trier (1845–1925)	5 October 1901	30 January 1905	3 years, 117 days	Venstre Reform Party	26th 27th	
10		Anders Thomsen (1842–1920)	31 January 1905	14 March 1912	7 years, 43 days	Venstre	27th 28th 29th 29th 30th	
11		Jens Christian Christensen (1856–1930)	15 March 1912	13 June 1913	1 year, 90 days	Venstre	30th	
12		Niels Pedersen-Nyskov (1850–1922)	14 June 1913	29 March 1922	8 years, 288 days	Venstre	31st 32nd 33rd 34th 35th 36th	
13		Jørgen Jensen-Klejs (1863–1947)	7 April 1922	10 April 1924	2 years, 3 days	Venstre	36th	
14		Hans Peter Hansen (1872–1953)	30 April 1924	24 November 1932	8 years, 208 days	Social Democrats	37th 38th 39th	
15		Gerhard Nielsen (1871–1933)	30 November 1932	1 May 1933 #	152 days	Social Democrats	40th	
16		Hans Rasmussen (1873–1949)	9 May 1933	30 October 1945	12 years, 174 days	Social Democrats	40th 41st 42nd 43rd	
17		Julius Bomholt (1896–1969)	22 November 1945	22 February 1950	4 years, 92 days	Social Democrats	44th 45th	
18		Gustav Pedersen (1893–1975)	23 February 1950	22 September 1964	14 years, 212 days	Social Democrats	46th 47th 48th 49th 50th	
(17)		Julius Bomholt (1896–1969)	6 October 1964	22 January 1968	3 years, 108 days	Social Democrats	51st 52nd	
19		Karl Skytte (1908–1986)	6 February 1968	30 September 1978	10 years, 236 days	Social Liberal	53rd 54th 55th 56th 57th	
20		Knud Børge Andersen (1914–1984)	3 October 1978	8 December 1981	3 years, 66 days	Social Democrats	57th 58th	
21		Svend Jakobsen (1935–2022)	22 December 1981	10 January 1989	7 years, 19 days	Social Democrats	59th 60th 61st 62nd	
22		Erik Ninn-Hansen (1922–2014)	10 January 1989	3 October 1989	266 days	Conservative	62nd	
23		H. P. Clausen (1928–1998)	3 October 1989	15 January 1993	3 years, 104 days	Conservative	62nd 63rd	
24		Henning Rasmussen (1926–1997)	27 January 1993	5 October 1994	1 year, 251 days	Social Democrats	63rd	
25		Erling Olsen (1927–2011)	5 October 1994	11 March 1998	3 years, 157 days	Social Democrats	64th	
26		Ivar Hansen (1938–2003)	26 March 1998	11 March 2003 #	4 years, 350 days	Venstre	65th 66th	
–		Svend Auken (1943–2009) acting	11 March 2003	18 March 2003	7 days	Social Democrats	66th	
27		Christian Mejdahl (born 1939)	18 March 2003	13 November 2007	4 years, 240 days	Venstre	66th 67th	
28		Thor Pedersen (born 1945)	28 November 2007	15 September 2011	3 years, 291 days	Venstre	68th	
29		Mogens Lykketoft (born 1946)	4 October 2011	18 June 2015	3 years, 257 days	Social Democrats	69th	
30		Pia Kjærsgaard (born 1947)	3 July 2015	20 June 2019	3 years, 352 days	Danish People's Party	70th	
31		Henrik Dam Kristensen (born 1957)	21 June 2019	1 November 2022	3 years, 133 days	Social Democrats	71st	
32		Søren Gade (born 1963)	16 November 2022	6. October 2026	3 years, 364 days	Venstre	72nd 73rd	
33		Henrik Frandsen (born 1961)	6 October 2026	Incumbent	40 days	Moderates	73rd	

== See also ==
- Speaker of the Landsting (1850-1953)

== Sources ==
- Rasmussen, Hanne (2021). 30 Mænd Og En Kvinde: Folketingets formænd fra 1850 [30 Men and one woman: Speakers of the Folketing from 1850] (in Danish). Gads Forlag. ISBN 978-8-712061-16-8.
