= Anette Egelund =

Danish transgender politician (born 1956)

Anette Christine Egelund Holm (born 25 March 1956, birth name Hugo Holm) is a Danish politician.

== Personal life ==
Egelund was born on 25 March 1956 in Svendborg. After starting an apprenticeship in the local hotel, Egelund worked as a sailor, had tattoos and grew a beard.

Holm changed her name to Anette Christine Egelund Holm in 2000 and had gender reassignment surgery in Bangkok in 2004. A television documentary about her life was made in 2003, discussing her plans for the operation.

== Political career ==
Egelund was a member of the Folketing from 1-15 December 1988 as a substitute for Pia Kjærsgaard, and from 26 January 1989 to 1 November 1990 as the member for Funen for the Progress Party. Egelund lost the seat after being sentenced to six months' imprisonment for drunk driving.

Egelund stood for election in 2009 for the Liberal Alliance party but was not elected.
