= Else Winther Andersen =

Danish politician (born 1941)

Member of the Folketing for the Aarhus County constituency
- In office 12 December 1990 – 8 February 2005

Minister of Social Affairs
- In office 18 December 1990 – 25 January 1993
- Monarch: Margrethe II
- Prime Minister: Poul Schlüter
- Preceded by: Aase Olesen
- Succeeded by: Karen Jespersen

Personal details
- Born: 5 April 1941 (age 85) Støvring, Denmark
- Party: Venstre
- Spouse: Preben Wittrup Andersen (m. 1962)
- Children: 2
- Occupation: Politician; Teacher; Social worker

Else Winther Andersen (born 5 April 1941) is a Danish Venstre politician, teacher and social worker who served as the Minister of Social Affairs under Prime Minister Poul Schlüter from 18 December 1990 until her resignation on 25 January 1993. She was also a member of the Folketing for the Aarhus County constituency between 1990 and 2005. Andersen was appointed Commander of the Order of the Dannebrog in 1991.

== Early life and education ==
Andersen was born to the farm owner Jens Winther and Alma Ditlev Winther (née Pedersen) in a Grundtvig farmhouse located in Støvring on 5 April 1941. She was raised on the farm which was located close to Aalborg. Andersen began her schooling at the Støvring School from 1948 to 1955 and then went on to attend the junior high school Østhimmerlands Ungdomsskole in 1957 and the high school Gerlev Idrætshøjskole two years later. She also had a stay at Gerlev Sports College in Zealand.

== Career ==
From 1959 to 1961, she worked as an hourly paid sports cover teacher at Videbæk Municipal School Office and she also taught swimming in West Jutland. Andersen worked as an assistant agricultural wife at a farm near the North Jutland Agricultural School in Nibe with her husband between 1962 and 1976. She was a member of the national management of the Danish Agricultural Youth, and took part in the production of the first non-academic agricultural examination called The Green Certificate between 1968 and 1976. Andersen was diagnosed with skin cancer in 1973, and took some time off work to undergo surgery to remove the tumours the following year. Locally, she took part in child and youth work as chair of the upper secondary school board and as a school commission member from 1972 to 1980.

In 1974, Andersen was employed as a course leader and teacher at Landbrugets Oplysnings og Konsulenttjeneste. She trained to become a social worker at Aalborg University between 1976 and 1983 with a dispensation and she went on to gain employment at Randers Municipality as a social consultant, where she worked part-time from 1983 to 1990. Andersen began advising farmers at Randers Agricultural Center from 1985. That same year, she stood for election to represent the Randerskredsen constituency in the Folketing as a member of the Venstre political party after she was encouraged to do so by people in the party but was unsuccessful. Andersen also unsuccessfully failed to get elected as a representative of the Grenaakredsen constituency at the 1988 Danish general election three years later. From 29 November 1988 to 30 November 1990, she served as a deputy member of the Folketing variously for Uffe Ellemann-Jensen, Jørgen Winther and Knud Enggaard in the Aarhus County constituency.

She became a member of Randers City Council for a one-year period in 1990. At the 1990 Danish general election on 12 December of that year, Andersen successfully stood for election to the Folketing in the Aarhus County constituency. Five days later, she was contacted by Venstre party secretary Claus Hjort Frederiksen and was asked to become the new Minister of Social Affairs under the government of Poul Schlüter. Andersen accepted and began working in the job on 18 December 1990 and resigned on 25 January 1993 when Prime Minister Schlüter's government resigned as a consequence of the Tamil Case. She had worked to help young people enrol on the development assistance system and helped to decentralise social policy.

Andersen returned to local government when she was re-elected to Randers City Council in 1993. In 1994, she joined the board of the OK Foundation which constructs and operates nursing homes for senior citizens in Denmark and became its chair in 2002. Andersen resigned from Randers City Council on 31 December 2001 and she stood down from the Folketing at the 2005 Danish general election on 8 February of that year. From 1999, she served as a member of the Parkinson's Association's primary board, a member of each of Jysk Børneforsorg, Café Lytten, the Health Insurance Fund and a member of the board of representatives of Randen Cooperative Fund.

== Personal life ==
Andersen has been married to the farm owner and production manager Preben Wittrup Andersen since 14 April 1962. They have two children. Her daughter, Anne-Mette Winther Christiansen, has also been elected to the Folketing. In 1991, Andersen was appointed Commander of the Order of the Dannebrog.
