= Sonja Albrink =

Danish politician

Member of the Folketing
- In office 1984–2001
- Constituency: Vejle County

Personal details
- Born: 21 August 1948
- Died: 27 August 2012 (aged 64)
- Party: Centre Democrats

Sonja Albrink (21 August 1948 – 27 August 2012) was a Danish politician from the Centre Democrats. She was a member of the Folketing from 1984 to 2001.

== See also ==
- List of members of the Folketing, 1998–2001
- List of members of the Folketing, 1994–1998
- List of members of the Folketing, 1990–1994
- List of members of the Folketing, 1988–1990
- List of members of the Folketing, 1987–1988
- List of members of the Folketing, 1984–1987
