= Kurt Frederiksen =

Danish politician

Member of the Folketing
- In office 8 September 1987 – 9 May 1988
- Constituency: Fyn

Personal details
- Born: 3 March 1947 (age 79) Fejø, Denmark
- Party: Common Course

Kurt Flemming Frederiksen (born 3 March 1947 on Fejø) is a Danish politician, who was a member of the Folketing for Common Course from 1987 to 1988.

== Political career ==
Frederiksen was elected into parliament at the 1987 Danish general election, where Common Course received 2.2% of the votes, resulting in four seats in parliament. While in parliament, Frederiksen worked with the other members of his party to ban advertisements and commercials for spirits and tobacco, with the proposal ending up getting passed in parliament. At the 1988 election Frederiksen was not reelected.
