= 1975 Danish general election =

- 9 January 1975
- All 179 seats in the Folketing; 90 seats needed for a majority
- Turnout: 88.23%
Party	Leader	Vote %	Seats	+/–
Social Democrats	Anker Jørgensen	29.94	53	+7
Venstre	Poul Hartling	23.33	42	+20
Progress	Mogens Glistrup	13.58	24	−4
Social Liberals	Svend Haugaard	7.10	13	−7
Conservatives	Poul Schlüter	5.51	10	−6
KrF	Jens Møller	5.34	9	+2
SF	Gert Petersen	4.95	9	−2
Communists	Knud Jespersen	4.19	7	+1
Centre Democrats	Erhard Jakobsen	2.17	4	−10
Left Socialists	Collective leadership	2.08	4	+4
Elected in the Faroe Islands
Social Democratic	Atli Dam	29.69	1	0
Republican	Signar Hansen	25.72	1	0
Elected in Greenland
Independents	–	100	2	0
This lists parties that won seats. See the complete results below.

Government before	Government after election
Hartling; Venstre	Jørgensen II; Social Democrats

General elections were held in Denmark on 9 January 1975. The result was a victory for the Social Democratic Party, who won 53 of the 179 seats. Voter turnout was 88% in Denmark proper, 56% in the Faroe Islands and 69% in Greenland.

== Political parties ==
The Soviet Union covertly funded the Communist Party of Denmark.

== Results ==
Party	Votes	%	Seats	+/–
Denmark proper
Social Democrats	913,155	29.94	53	+7
Venstre	711,298	23.33	42	+20
Progress Party	414,219	13.58	24	–4
Danish Social Liberal Party	216,553	7.10	13	–7
Conservative People's Party	168,164	5.51	10	–6
Christian People's Party	162,734	5.34	9	+2
Socialist People's Party	150,963	4.95	9	–2
Communist Party of Denmark	127,837	4.19	7	+1
Centre Democrats	66,316	2.17	4	–10
Left Socialists	63,579	2.08	4	+4
Justice Party of Denmark	54,095	1.77	0	–5
Independents	539	0.02	0	0
Total	3,049,452	100.00	175	0
Valid votes	3,049,452	99.39		
Invalid/blank votes	18,850	0.61		
Total votes	3,068,302	100.00		
Registered voters/turnout	3,477,621	88.23		
Faroe Islands
Social Democratic Party	4,112	29.69	1	0
Republican Party	3,563	25.72	1	0
Union Party	3,219	23.24	0	0
People's Party	2,957	21.35	0	0
Total	13,851	100.00	2	0
Valid votes	13,851	99.79		
Invalid/blank votes	29	0.21		
Total votes	13,880	100.00		
Registered voters/turnout	24,630	56.35		
Greenland
Independents	16,649	100.00	2	0
Total	16,649	100.00	2	0
Valid votes	16,649	97.53		
Invalid/blank votes	421	2.47		
Total votes	17,070	100.00		
Registered voters/turnout	24,838	68.73		
Source: Nohlen & Stöver, Danmarks Statistik
