= Ivar Hansen =

Danish politician

Speaker of the Folketing
- In office 26 March 1998 – 11 March 2003
- Monarch: Margrethe II
- Preceded by: Erling Olsen
- Succeeded by: Christian Mejdahl

Minister of Public Works
- In office 30 August 1978 – 26 October 1979
- Prime Minister: Anker Jørgensen
- Preceded by: Kjeld Olesen
- Succeeded by: Jens Risgaard Knudsen

Member of Parliament for Ribe Amt
- In office 4 December 1973 – 11 March 2003

Personal details
- Born: November 1, 1938 Agerbæk, Denmark
- Died: March 11, 2003 (aged 64) Copenhagen, Denmark
- Party: Venstre
- Occupation: Farmer

Ivar Hansen (1 November 1938 – 11 March 2003) was a Danish politician from the Liberal party Venstre.

He was elected to the Folketing in 1973. In 1978–79, he was Minister of Public Works in the Anker Jørgensen cabinet. In 1998, he became speaker of the Folketing defeating his Social Democrat rival, Birte Weiss, after a drawing of lots.

He served until his sudden death in the Copenhagen apartment of his mistress Mariann Fischer Boel, who was at the time Minister for Foods and Agriculture. She publicly announced the death after she had talked to his wife. She continued her work and went on to become the European Commissioner for Agriculture.

He was chairman of the JydskeVestkysten newspaper from 1991 to 1998.

Political offices
Preceded by Kjeld Olesen	Minister for Public Works; 30 August 1978 – 26 October 1979	Succeeded by Jens Risgaard Knudsen
Preceded by Erling Olsen	Speaker of the Folketing; 26 March 1998 – 11 March 2003	Succeeded by Christian Mejdahl
