= Christian Aagaard =

Danish politician (1937–2022)

Member of the Folketing
- In office 1 May 1997 – 11 March 1998
- Constituency: Århus
- In office 10 January 1984 – 20 September 1994
- Constituency: Århus

Personal details
- Born: 22 January 1937 Hjallerup, Denmark
- Died: 8 January 2022 (aged 84)
- Party: Conservative People's Party

Christian O. Aagaard (22 January 1937 – 8 January 2022) was a Danish politician, who was a member of the Folketing for the Conservative People's Party from 1984 to 1994 and again from 1997 to 1998. Aagaard died on 8 January 2022.

== Political career ==
Aagaard was a member of Silkeborg Municipality's municipal council, as well as a member of the county council of Århus County.

Aagaard was a candidate for the Conservative People's Party from 1983 and was first elected into parliament at the 1984 Danish general election. He was reelected in 1987, 1988 and 1990. He did not get elected in the 1994 election, but became a substitute for the Conservative People's Party in the Århus constituency. He entered parliament as a substitute member from 29 October to 22 November 1996. On 1 May 1997 Hans Peter Clausen resigned his seat, and Aagaard entered parliament, taking over Clausen's seat.
