= Port of Aalborg =

Port in Aalborg, Denmark

Aalborg
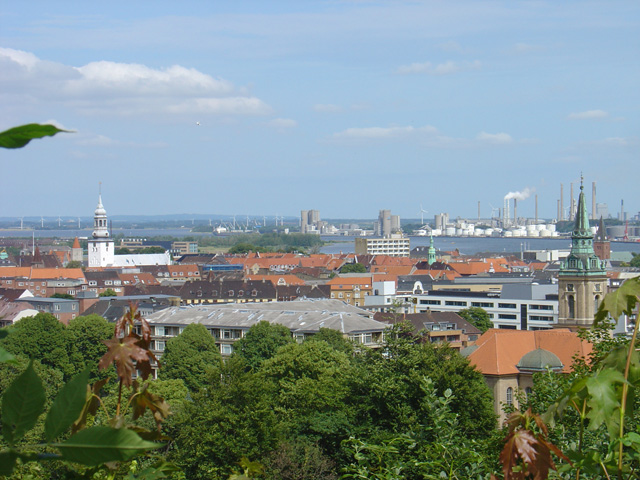
- View of the Port of Aalborg, Denmark from the hill Skovbakken
- Interactive map of Aalborg
- Location in Denmark

Location
- Country: Denmark
- Coordinates: 57°03′N 9°55′E
- UN/LOCODE: DKAAL

Details
- No. of berths: 25
- Draft depth: Depth 9.4 metres (31 ft)

Statistics
- Website portofaalborg.com

The Danish company Port of Aalborg A/S (formerly Aalborg Havn A/S), headquartered in the East Port in Aalborg, is one of largest commercial ports in Denmark.

Port of Aalborg is an inter-modal inland port linked by water, road and rail with a focus on developing the business park in the hinterland and nearby industrial areas. The company owns an area of 4.1 million m^{2} north and south of the fjord, where 100 companies are established, as well as transport centres and railway terminals that connect the port to the European rail network.

Port of Aalborg Groups is a limited liability company wholly by Aalborg Municipality, with its board of directors comprising politicians, business people and internal employees. The group employs 100 workers (2022).

The parent company Port of Aalborg A/S is engaged in the following subsidiaries and associated companies:

- Port of Aalborg Logistics A/S
- Aalborg Stevedore Company A/S
- Port of Aalborg Research & Development
- Port of Aalborg Real Estate A/S
- Port of Aalborg Rail A/S
- Port of Aalborg Tankstorage Aps
- Aalborg Toldopslag A/S

In 2020, Aalborg Havn changed its name to Port of Aalborg in connection with a new corporate strategy. Based on the strategy, Port of Aalborg has increasingly shifted focus from waterfront to the land along with the development of the nearby business park, which forms part of the area that Aalborg Municipality has designated as Aalborg's future business development and growth zone. Port of Aalborg has set targets to double its turnover to DKK 400 million, invest DKK 2 billion, attract 10-15 international companies and create 5,000 new jobs in the municipality by 2030.

== See also ==
- Ports of the Baltic Sea
