= Pernille Sams =

Danish politician

Member of the Folketing
- In office 8 September 1987 – 20 November 2001
- Constituency: Randers constituency (1987–1998)
- Constituency: Frederiksborg County constituency (1998–2001)

Personal details
- Born: Pernille Merete Sams; 27 November 1959 (age 66) Kongens Lyngby, Denmark
- Party: Conservative People's Party
- Spouse: Preben Pamsgaard (m. 1987)
- Education: University of Copenhagen
- Occupation: Lawyer; Real estate agent
- Awards: Knight of the Order of the Dannebrog

Pernille Merete Sams (born 27 November 1959) is a Danish real estate agent, lawyer and former Conservative People's Party politician who was a member of the Folketing from 1987 to 2001. She was the lawyer of the Conservative People's Party and of its membership before gaining election to the Folketing in 1987. Sams established her real estate business in 1998 and focused on it full time after leaving politics in 2001. She has co- presented the TV 2 programme Liebhaverne alongside Jan Fog and is chair of Denmark's independent real estate agents association, the Danish Independent Estate Agents, since its establishment in 2009. Sams was appointed Knight of the Order of the Dannebrog in 1997.

== Early life and education ==
On 27 November 1959, Sams was born in Kongens Lyngby, to the optician Gunnar Sams and Inga Sams. She became interested in a wide variety of topics during her youth. Between 1966 and 1975, Sams was educated at Hillerødsholm School, after she and her family relocated to Hillerød. She then went to Frederiksborg Latin School in 1984. Sams graduated from the University of Copenhagen in 1984 with a Candidate of Law degree.

== Career ==
She briefly became a member of Hillerød City Council in 1982. While Sams did not enjoy judicial disputes, she was appointed the lawyer of the Conservative People's Party from 1981 to 1987 and of its conservative membership in the European Parliament between 1984 and 1985. In 1986, she was employed at the architectural firm Arne Meldgaard and became a director the following year.

Acting Conservative People's Party chairperson Knud Østergaard wanted Sams to run on behalf of the party at the Randers constituency in the 1987 Danish general election to elect members of the Folketing. She declined the offer because she was disinterested in national politics at that time. Sams changed her mind when she attended a group meeting in Randers and gained election to the Århus County constituency on 8 September 1987. In 1992, she became a member of the Council of Equalization, was made deputy chair of the Conservative parliamentary group in 1997 and the National Tax Court from 1998. Sams was also their housing and building rapporteur.

At the 1998 Danish general election, she gained election to represent the Frederiksborg County constituency for the Conservative People's Party. That same year, Sams established an estate agency at her home in Gørløse after becoming a state licensed estate agent. In 1999, she appeared on the TV3 programme Seksorama in which she discussed her sexual life and said that working at the Christiansborg Palace was unexciting. Sams made the decision to not stand for reelection at the 2001 Danish general election to focus on running her estate agency.

She left the Folketing on 20 November 2001, and moved from Slotsholmen to North Zealand to work as an interior designer as well as an estate agent. In 2003, she was appointed by Flemming Hansen, the Minister of Traffic, to the boards of the financial company Sund & Bælt Partner A/S and the Øresund consortium. Sams moved into the television industry in 2005, becoming co-presenter of the TV 2 programme Liebhaverne alongside Jan Fog. In early 2009, she helped to found the Danish Independent Estate Agents (DSE), an association for Denmark's independent real estate agents. Sams did so in protest against the attempts of larger bank-owned estate agent chains to become predominant in Danish real estate. She establishes cooperation agreements with real estate brokerage chains on behalf of the DSE. Sams has also presented the TV 2 programme Huse der aldrig kommer til salg. She has served as chair of the anti-animal abuse organisation, the World Animal Protection Denmark, since 2017, is on the board of representatives of the pension association Velliv, Pension & Livsforsikring, and the Danish Real Estate Association.

== Personal life ==
She is married to the former director Preben Pamsgaard since 1987 and is stepmother to his two children from a previous relationship; she has no biological children. Sams was appointed a Knight of the Order of Dannebrog in 1997. A black-and-white photograph of her taken by Jan F. Stephan during the 1990s is stored in the archives of Hillerød Library.
