= Aase Olesen =

Danish politician (1934–2013)

Member of the Folketing for the Frederiksborg County constituency
- In office 1 October 1974 – 14 February 1977
- In office 23 October 1979 – 18 December 1990

Minister of Social Affairs
- In office 3 June 1988 – 18 December 1990
- Monarch: Margrethe II
- Prime Minister: Poul Schlüter
- Preceded by: Mimi Jakobsen
- Succeeded by: Else Winther Andersen

Personal details
- Born: Aase Larsen; 24 September 1934 Horsens, Denmark
- Died: 1 February 2013 (aged 78) Hellerup, Denmark
- Party: Danish Social Liberal Party
- Spouse: Tormod Olesen (m. 1954)
- Children: 2
- Occupation: Teacher

Aase Olesen (née Larsen; 24 September 1934 – 1 February 2013) was a Danish politician for the Danish Social Liberal Party and teacher. She worked as a teacher at Hørsholm Municipal School before joining the Danish Social Liberal Party in 1967. Olesen was elected to the Folketing from October 1974 to December 1990 and was appointed Minister of Social Affairs in the government of Poul Schlüter between June 1988 and December 1990. She was chair of a social committee established by Schlüter in 1991 and whose recommendations were implemented into Danish social policy law in 1993. From 1984 to 1988, she was a member of the Nordic Council.

== Early life ==
Olesen was born on 24 September 1934 in Horsens. She was the daughter of the lithographers Eigill Larsen and Erna Larsen and had one younger brother. Olesen was brought up in a house where her father was a left-wing trade unionist and her mother did homemaking. From 1942 to 1946, she was educated at Østre Skole in Horsens. Olesen passed the examination to become a teacher at Skolen ved Sundet in Copenhagen in 1952, and she subsequently passed the teacher examination at Statsseminariet på Emdrupborg four years later. She also took a course in Danish, English and Swedish at the Danish Teacher Training College.

== Career ==
Between 1956 and 1958, Olesen worked as a teacher at Hørsholm Municipal School. She returned to Horsens in 1958, and became a housewife until 1970. Olesen became a member of the Danish Social Liberal Party in 1967. She began working as the co-owner and employee of her husband's design studio from 1970, as well as becoming chair of the local voters association in the same year. Olesen unsuccessfully stood for election on behalf of the Danish Social Liberal Party to represent the Folketing constituency of Helsingør in the 1971 Danish general election. She would was elected to the Folketing representing the Hillerød constituency on 1 October 1974. Olesen took part in business, housing and tax policy.

She was a member or chair of several boards during her career. Olesen was a member of Helsinge City Council from 1970 to 1974 and was put on the social committee instead of the technical committee she wanted to be on. She was county-secretary for the Danish Social Liberal Party in Frederiksborg County from 1969 to 1971; vice-chair of the Danish Social Liberal Party's organising committee between 1970 and 1972; secretary of the Danish Social Liberal Party's municipal policy committee between 1972 and 1973 and subsequently chair between 1973 and 1974 and again from 1977 to 1979; member of the Ministry of Justice's marriage committee from 1975 to 1983 and of the Road Safety Commission between 1980 and 1988; member of the Nordic Council from 1984 to 1988; and chair of the Folketing's Social Affairs Committee between 1987 and 1988.

Olesen stood for election for the Danish Social Liberal Party in the Hillerød constituency at the 1977 Danish general election but she was not elected since the party suffered a heavy defeat. She obtained election to the Folketing for the second time, when she was elected to represent the Frederiksborg County for the Danish Social Liberal Party in the Folketing on 23 October 1979. Olesen also occasionally wrote songs during this period and opposed the European Community. She served as Minister of Social Affairs in the government of Poul Schlüter between 3 June 1988 and 18 December 1990, and she was one of the Danish Social Liberal Party's first women government ministers. Olesen supported voluntary social work for young people and attempted to legislate a ban on smoking and the workplace in public since she was an avid anti-smoker.

After the 1990 Danish general election, she resigned from the Folketing and she then lost her ministerial post. When a social committee was established by Schlüter in 1991, Olesen was appointed the committee's chair by Schlüter, which put forward recommendations to reform Denmark's whole social field to further simplify it. The commission produced 20 presentations and reports on multiple sub-areas, of which she attempted to address some taboos and expressed hope she wanted to eliminate some increase in income transfers and all demands should be placed on social benefit claimants. The commission's recommendations were implemented into social policy law in 1993. From 1995 to 2008, she was chair of Kofoeds School's board. Olesen was deputy chair of the Association of Former members of parliament and a member of the board of the Red Cross' Odd Fellow Order's Children's Fund. She was also chair of the Arbejdsmarkedets Feriefond that she stood down from in 2008. She was a co-signator of a 2007 open letter asking the party's parliamentary group to support a referendum on the Treaty of Lisbon.

== Personal life ==
Olesen married the architect Tormod Olesen on 7 April 1954, with whom she had two children. On 1 February 2013, she died at the Sankt Lukas Foundation's hospice in Hellerup.
