= Bjørn Elmquist =

Danish politician and lawyer

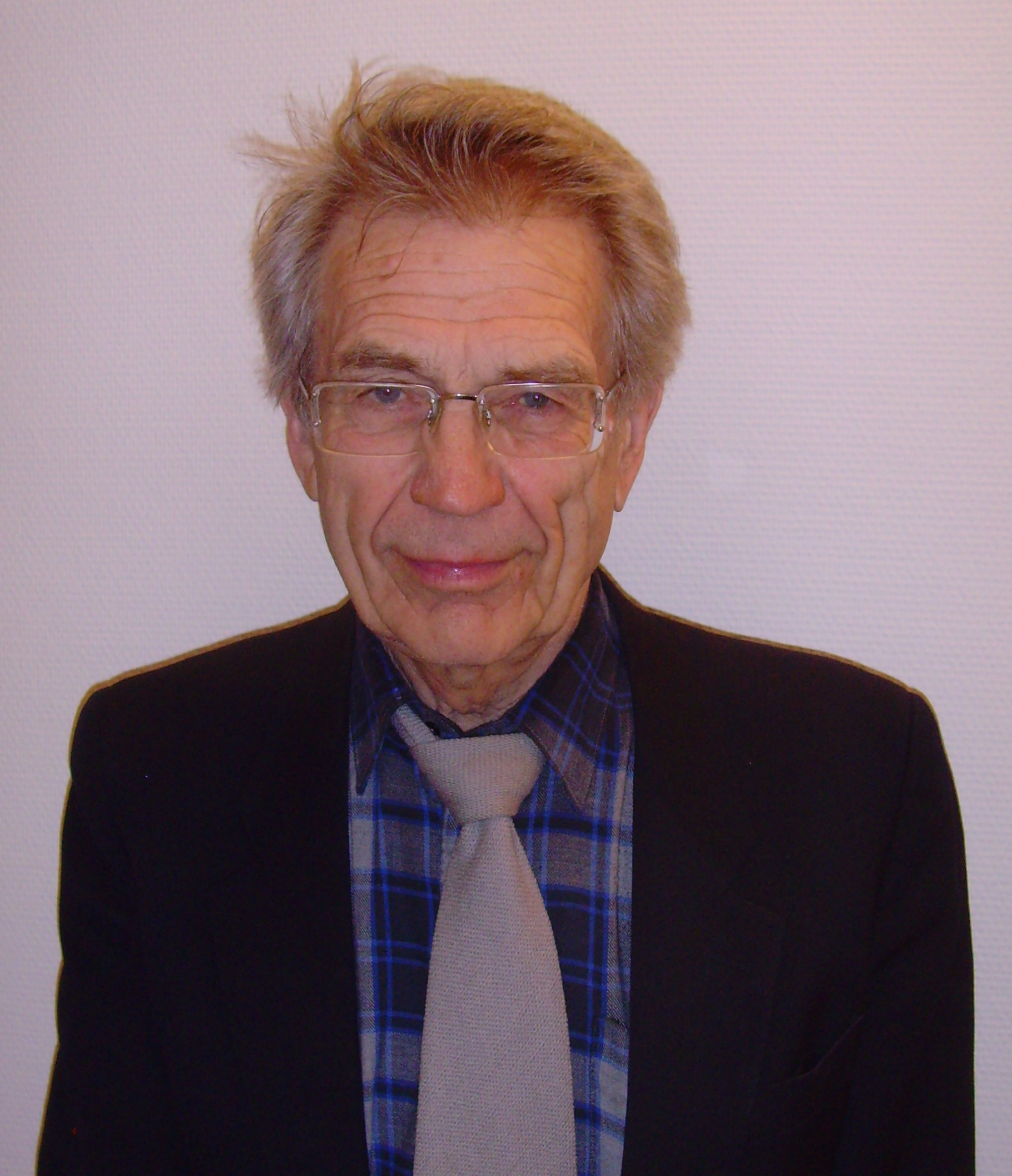
- Bjørn Elmquist
- Born: 13 December 1938 (age 87); Svendborg, Denmark
- Occupations: journalist, lawyer

Bjørn Elmquist (born 13 November 1938 in Svendborg) is a Danish lawyer and journalist, who served as member of parliament for Denmark's Liberal Party from 1978 to 1990, and then the Danish Social Liberal Party from 1990 until 1998.
