= Kent Kirk =

Danish businessman and politician (born 1948)

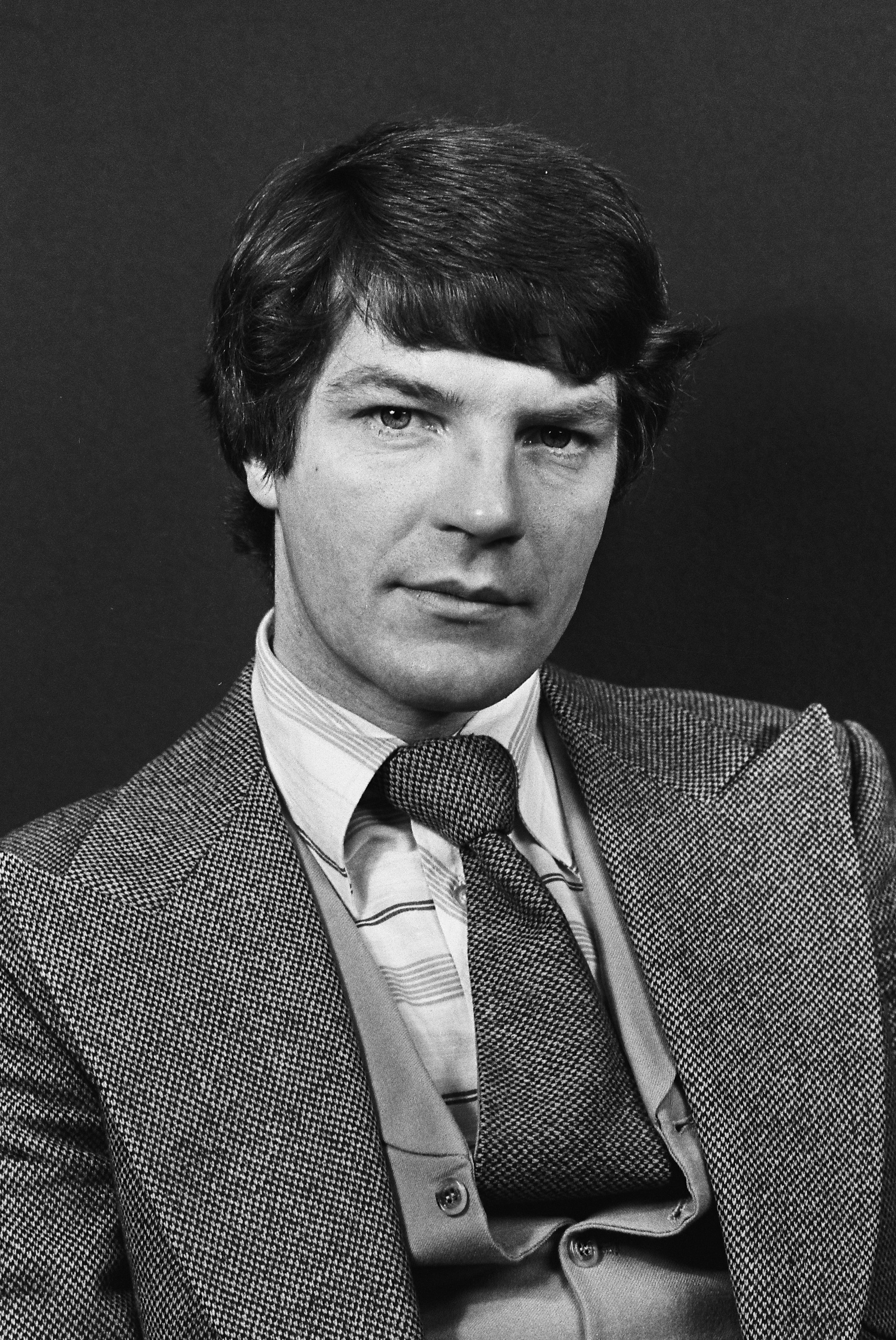

Minister of Fisheries
- In office October 1989 – 1994
- Prime Minister: Poul Schlüter
- Preceded by: Lars P. Gammelgaard
- Succeeded by: Bjørn Westh

Personal details
- Born: August 26, 1948 (age 77) Esbjerg, Denmark
- Party: Conservative People’s Party

Kent Kirk (born 26 August 1948) is a Danish businessman and former politician from the Conservative People's Party. He served at the European Parliament from 1979 to 1984 and at the Danish Parliament from 1984 to 1998. He was the minister of fisheries between 1989 and 1993.

== Early life ==
Kirk was born in Esbjerg in 1948. He has six siblings.

== Career ==
Kirk became chairman of the Esbjerg Fishing Association in 1975 and remained in the post until 1989. He is a member of the Conservative People's Party. He served at the European Parliament between 1979 and 1984. Then he was elected to the Danish Parliament in 1984 representing Christiansborg.

In October 1989 Kirk was appointed minister of fisheries succeeding Lars P. Gammelgaard in the post. Kirk's tenure lasted until 1994 when he was replaced by Bjørn Westh in the post. Kirk served in two consecutive cabinets of Prime Minister Poul Schlüter. During his ministerial tenure Kirk focused on the interests of the Esbjerg fleet instead of adopting his policy to other regions.

Kirk did not win his seat in the general election in March 1998 and retired from politics. He has been involved in business since then. Kirk returned to politics in 2005 when he was elected as a member to the regional council in the Region of Southern Denmark, but he left the post in 2009.

== Personal life ==
Kirk lives in Espergærde, North Zealand.
