= Kaj Ikast =

Danish politician (1935–2020)

Minister of Transport
- In office 18 December 1990 – 25 January 1993
- Preceded by: Knud Østergaard
- Succeeded by: Helge Mortensen

Member of the Folketing
- In office 28 June 1983 – 8 February 2005

Personal details
- Born: 22 December 1935 Viborg, Denmark
- Died: 3 December 2020 (aged 84)
- Party: KF

Kaj Ikast (22 December 1935 – 3 December 2020) was a Danish politician.

He served in the Folketing and was the minister of transport from 1990 to 1993.
