= Leif Hermann =

Danish politician (1941–2022)

Member of the Folketing
- In office 10 January 1984 – 11 December 1990
- Constituency: Viborg County

Personal details
- Born: 11 August 1941 Hellerup, German-occupied Denmark
- Died: 13 March 2022 (aged 80) Amager, Denmark
- Party: SF
- Education: University of Copenhagen

Leif Hermann (11 August 1941 – 13 March 2022) was a Danish politician. A member of the Socialist People's Party, he served in the Folketing from 1984 to 1990. He died in Amager on 13 March 2022, at the age of 80.
