= Asbjørn Agerschou =

Danish politician (1948–2024)

Member of the Folketing for Ribe County constituency
- In office 8 December 1981 – 11 December 1990

Personal details
- Born: 22 February 1948 Svaneke, Bornholm, Denmark
- Died: 8 November 2024 (aged 76)
- Party: SF
- Occupation: Seminary teacher

Asbjøorn Agerschou (22 February 1948 – 8 November 2024) was a Danish seminary teacher and politician. A member of the Green Left, he served in the Folketing from 1981 to 1990.

Agerschou died on 8 November 2024, at the age of 76.
