= Helge Dohrmann =

Danish politician (1939–1989)

- Born: 22 February 1939; Stepping, Denmark
- Died: 19 September 1989 (aged 50)
- Occupation: Businessman
- Political party: Progress Party

Helge Dohrmann (1939–1989) was a Danish politician who was one of the leading figures of the Progress Party. He was a long-term member of the Danish Parliament where he represented the party from 1973 to his death in 1989.

== Biography ==
Dohrmann was born in Stepping on 22 February 1939. He worked as a contractor. He was elected to the parliament for the Progress Party from Southern Jutland region in December 1973 and served as a deputy until his death. In 1983 Dohrmann played a significant role in the continuation of the Danish cabinet led by Poul Schlüter. Schlüter and Dohrmann met at a Copenhagen restaurant named Rio Bravo where they reached an agreement about an upcoming law on children which has been known as the Rio Bravo settlement in the Danish political history. During this period Dohrmann was the leader of the parliamentary group of Progress Party. Although the party leader was Pia Kjærsgaard, she shared the party leadership with Dohrmann until 1988 during which the party significantly increased its support. Its support decreased from 1988 when Kjærsgaard became the sole leader of the party.

Dohrmann died on 19 September 1989.
