= 1973 Danish general election =

- 4 December 1973
- All 179 seats in the Folketing; 90 seats needed for a majority
- Turnout: 88.32%
Party	Leader	Vote %	Seats	+/–
Social Democrats	Anker Jørgensen	25.65	46	−24
Progress	Mogens Glistrup	15.89	28	New
Venstre	Poul Hartling	12.26	22	−8
Social Liberals	Hilmar Baunsgaard	11.24	20	−7
Conservatives	Erik Ninn-Hansen	9.15	16	−15
Centre Democrats	Erhard Jakobsen	7.76	14	New
SF	Sigurd Ømann	6.01	11	−6
KrF	Jacob Christensen	4.05	7	+7
Communists	Knud Jespersen	3.63	6	+6
Justice	Ib Christensen	2.88	5	+5
Elected in the Faroe Islands
Social Democratic	Atli Dam	28.60	1	0
Republican	Signar Hansen	25.11	1	New
Elected in Greenland
Independents	–	100	2	0
This lists parties that won seats. See the complete results below.

Government before	Government after election
Jørgensen I Social Democrats	Hartling; Venstre

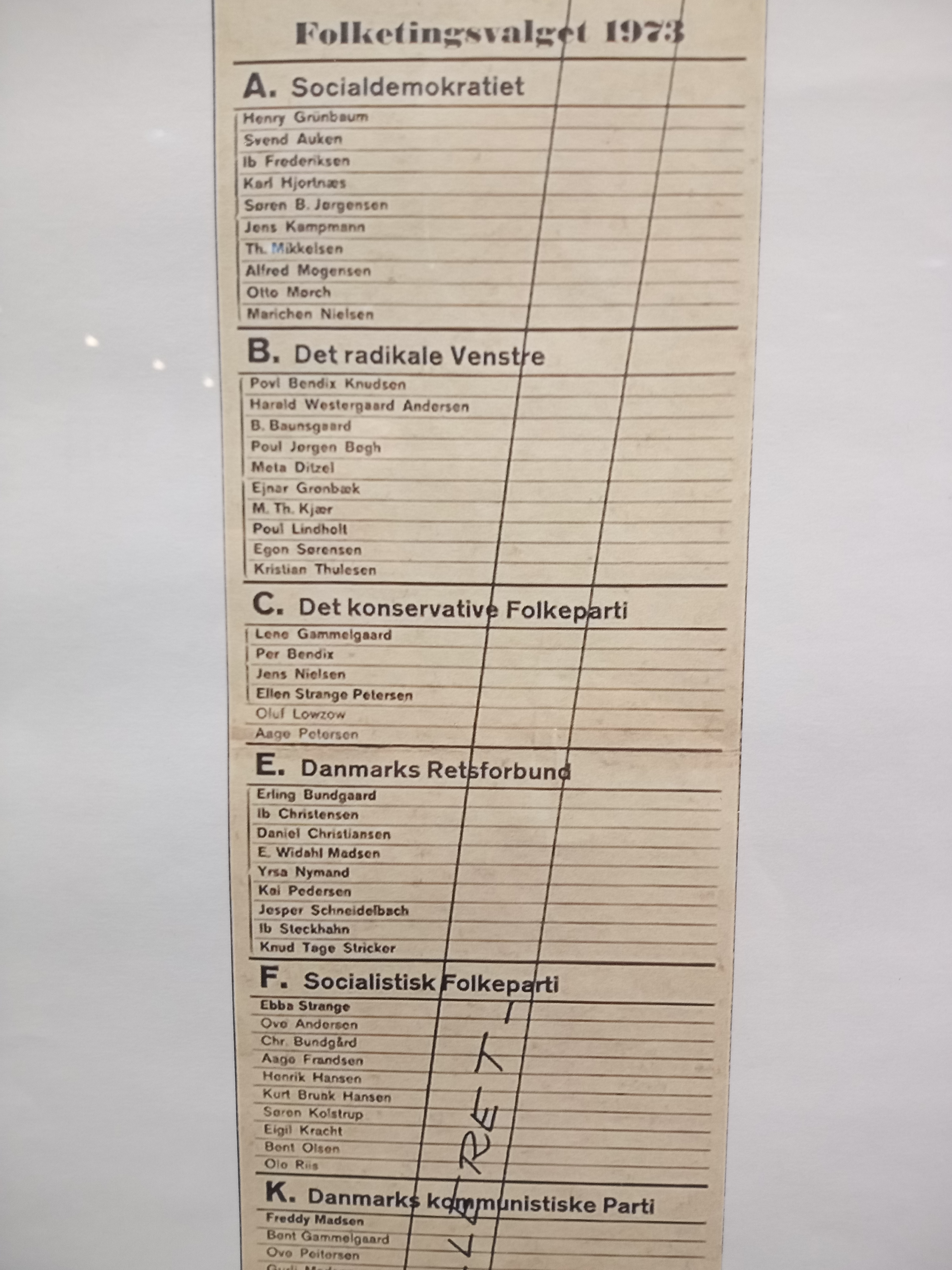
Ballot paper

General elections were held in Denmark on 4 December 1973 and in the Faroe Islands on 13 December. It has since been referred to as the "Landslide Election" (Danish: Jordskredsvalget), as five new or previously unrepresented parties won seats, and more than half the members of Parliament were replaced. The Social Democrats, which had led a minority government until this election, lost a third of their seats. After the election, Poul Hartling, the leader of the liberal Venstre, formed the smallest minority government in Denmark's history with only 22 seats, supported by the Progress Party, the Conservative People's Party, the Social Liberal Party, the Centre Democrats, and the Christian People's Party. Voter turnout was 89% in Denmark proper, 55% in the Faroe Islands, and 66% in Greenland.

== Parties ==
Two parties (the Christian People's Party and the Progress Party) campaigned against a grant awarded by the government-run Danish Film Institute for The Many Faces of Jesus, a proposed pornographic film about Jesus. The Soviet Union covertly funded the Communist Party of Denmark.

== Results ==
Party	Votes	%	Seats	+/–
Denmark proper
Social Democrats	783,145	25.65	46	–24
Progress Party	485,289	15.89	28	New
Venstre	374,283	12.26	22	–8
Danish Social Liberal Party	343,117	11.24	20	–7
Conservative People's Party	279,391	9.15	16	–15
Centre Democrats	236,784	7.76	14	New
Socialist People's Party	183,522	6.01	11	–6
Christian People's Party	123,573	4.05	7	+7
Communist Party of Denmark	110,715	3.63	6	+6
Justice Party of Denmark	87,904	2.88	5	+5
Left Socialists	44,843	1.47	0	0
Independents	637	0.02	0	0
Total	3,053,203	100.00	175	0
Valid votes	3,053,203	99.44		
Invalid/blank votes	17,050	0.56		
Total votes	3,070,253	100.00		
Registered voters/turnout	3,460,737	88.72		
Faroe Islands
Social Democratic Party	3,772	28.60	1	0
Republican Party	3,312	25.11	1	New
People's Party	2,690	20.39	0	–1
Union Party	2,533	19.20	0	0
Self-Government	553	4.19	0	0
Progress Party	258	1.96	0	0
Independents	72	0.55	0	0
Total	13,190	100.00	2	0
Valid votes	13,190	99.64		
Invalid/blank votes	47	0.36		
Total votes	13,237	100.00		
Registered voters/turnout	24,259	54.57		
Greenland
Independents	15,869	100.00	2	0
Total	15,869	100.00	2	0
Valid votes	15,869	96.87		
Invalid/blank votes	512	3.13		
Total votes	16,381	100.00		
Registered voters/turnout	24,838	65.95		
Source: Nohlen & Stöver

== See also ==
- 2015 Danish general election, which was called Hofteskredsvalget in reference to the term Jordskredsvalget
- Landslide victory
- Political realignment
