= Lilli Gyldenkilde =

Danish politician

Lilli Gyldenkilde MEP
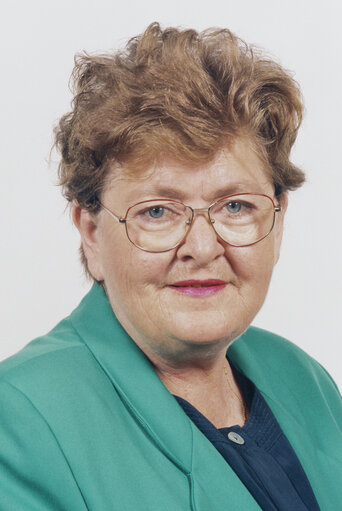

Member of the European Parliament
- In office 1994–1996
- Constituency: Denmark

Personal details
- Born: 13 February 1936 Horsens, Denmark
- Died: August 8, 2003 (aged 67) Denmark
- Party: Socialist People's Party

Lilli Helletofte Gyldenkilde (13 February 1936 – 8 August 2003) was a Danish politician who served as a member of the Folketing and a Member of the European Parliament. Born in Horsens, Gyldenkilde was raised by her grandparents. She attended school in Allégade, but left at 14 to join the workforce. She worked in a radio factory and a television factory, which aggravated a skin condition she had, causing her to leave the workforce at 27 and receive a disability pension. She was married three times – in 1958, 1963, and 1968 – and had three children.

Gyldenkilde became part of Denmark's Scouting Association, running a branch of it in 1973 and 1974. She also became interested in politics after leaving the workforce, joining the Social Democrats in the 1960s, then joining the Socialist People's Party in 1971. She became a member of the party out of Horsens, which led to her being nominated to the Folketing in 1977 via a leveling seat. During her time on the Folketing, she served on the Labor Market Committee and was a major supporter of unemployment benefits and opponent of the minimum pension.

In 1984, Gyldenkilde was named a member of the Nordic Council, serving until 1991. She was originally critical of the European Union, but after the fall of the Berlin Wall she opened up to the idea of it, and as a result ran for the European Parliament. She received 119,449 votes and won a spot as the lone representative of the Socialist People's Party, allying herself with the European United Left–Nordic Green Left. In the European Parliament, she was the primary representative for the International Labour Organization, as well as a member of the Employment Committee and the Women's Committee. In 1996, Gyldenkilde was forced out of the European Parliament due to a battle with cancer; she died from it seven years later in 2003.
