= Erling Olsen (politician) =

Danish politician

Erling Olsen (18 April 1927 – 27 June 2011) was a Danish politician for the Social Democrats. He was member of parliament 1964–66, 1971–73 and 1975–98, and was member of four Danish governments as minister of housing 1978–82 and minister of justice 1993–94. Olsen was Speaker of the Folketing from 1994 to 1998. He was professor of economics and the founder and first Dean of Roskilde University 1971–73. A man of many original ideas, he helped create the University of the Arctic, a so-called university without walls.

Political offices
Preceded by Henning Rasmussen	Speaker of the Folketing; 1994 – 26 March 1998	Succeeded by Ivar Hansen
