= 1988 Danish general election =

- 10 May 1988
- All 179 seats in the Folketing; 90 seats needed for a majority
- Turnout: 85.70%
Party	Leader	Vote %	Seats	+/–
Social Democrats	Svend Auken	29.82	55	+1
Conservatives	Poul Schlüter	19.29	35	−3
SF	Gert Petersen	13.01	24	−3
Venstre	Uffe Ellemann-Jensen	11.84	22	+3
Progress	Pia Kjærsgaard	8.96	16	+7
Social Liberals	Niels Helveg Petersen	5.58	10	−1
Centre Democrats	Erhard Jakobsen	4.67	9	0
KrF	Flemming Kofod-Svendsen	2.04	4	0
Elected in the Faroe Islands
People's	Jógvan Sundstein	24.68	1	0
Union	Pauli Ellefsen	24.43	1	+1
Elected in Greenland
Siumut	Jonathan Motzfeldt	40.07	1	0
Atassut	Otto Steenholdt	38.74	1	0
This lists parties that won seats. See the complete results below.

Government before	Government after election
Schlüter II; K–V–CD–KrF	Schlüter III; K–V–R

General elections were held in Denmark on 10 May 1988, just eight months after the last elections. Prime Minister Poul Schlüter chose to call for an election after the Conservative People's Party-led government fell short of a majority in a foreign policy issue after they failed to come to an agreement with the Social Democrats. In a parliamentary debate, Prime Minister Poul Schlüter accused Svend Auken (the leader of the Social Democrats) of breaking a political deal between the two of them whilst Auken accused Schlüter of lying to the public.

However, the election did not change the balance of power in the Folketing. Common Course failed to cross the 2% percent threshold and lost their four seats. The Centre Democrats and the Christian People's Party left the government (although they continued to support it) and were replaced by the Danish Social Liberal Party. The reason for doing this was that it gave Schlüter a majority in foreign policy issues which had caused this election. Nonetheless, the Centre Democrats and the Christian People's Party continued to support the government.

Voter turnout was 86% in Denmark proper, 70% in the Faroe Islands and 58% in Greenland.

== Results ==
Party	Votes	%	Seats	+/–
Denmark proper
Social Democrats	992,682	29.82	55	+1
Conservative People's Party	642,048	19.29	35	–3
Socialist People's Party	433,261	13.01	24	–3
Venstre	394,190	11.84	22	+3
Progress Party	298,132	8.96	16	+7
Danish Social Liberal Party	185,707	5.58	10	–1
Centre Democrats	155,464	4.67	9	0
Christian People's Party	68,047	2.04	4	0
Common Course	63,263	1.90	0	–4
The Greens	44,960	1.35	0	0
Communist Party of Denmark	27,439	0.82	0	0
Left Socialists	20,303	0.61	0	0
Independents	3,633	0.11	0	0
Total	3,329,129	100.00	175	0
Valid votes	3,329,129	99.30		
Invalid/blank votes	23,522	0.70		
Total votes	3,352,651	100.00		
Registered voters/turnout	3,911,897	85.70		
Faroe Islands
People's Party	5,655	24.68	1	0
Union Party	5,597	24.43	1	+1
Social Democratic Party	4,861	21.22	0	–1
Republican Party	4,690	20.47	0	0
Self-Government	897	3.91	0	0
Christian People's Party	891	3.89	0	0
Progress Party	321	1.40	0	0
Total	22,912	100.00	2	0
Valid votes	22,912	99.57		
Invalid/blank votes	100	0.43		
Total votes	23,012	100.00		
Registered voters/turnout	32,715	70.34		
Greenland
Siumut	8,415	40.07	1	0
Atassut	8,135	38.74	1	0
Inuit Ataqatigiit	3,628	17.28	0	0
Polar Party	821	3.91	0	0
Total	20,999	100.00	2	0
Valid votes	20,999	94.73		
Invalid/blank votes	1,169	5.27		
Total votes	22,168	100.00		
Registered voters/turnout	38,301	57.88		
Source: Nohlen & Stöver

== See also ==
- List of members of the Folketing, 1988–1990
