= Ole Espersen =

Danish politician (1934–2020)

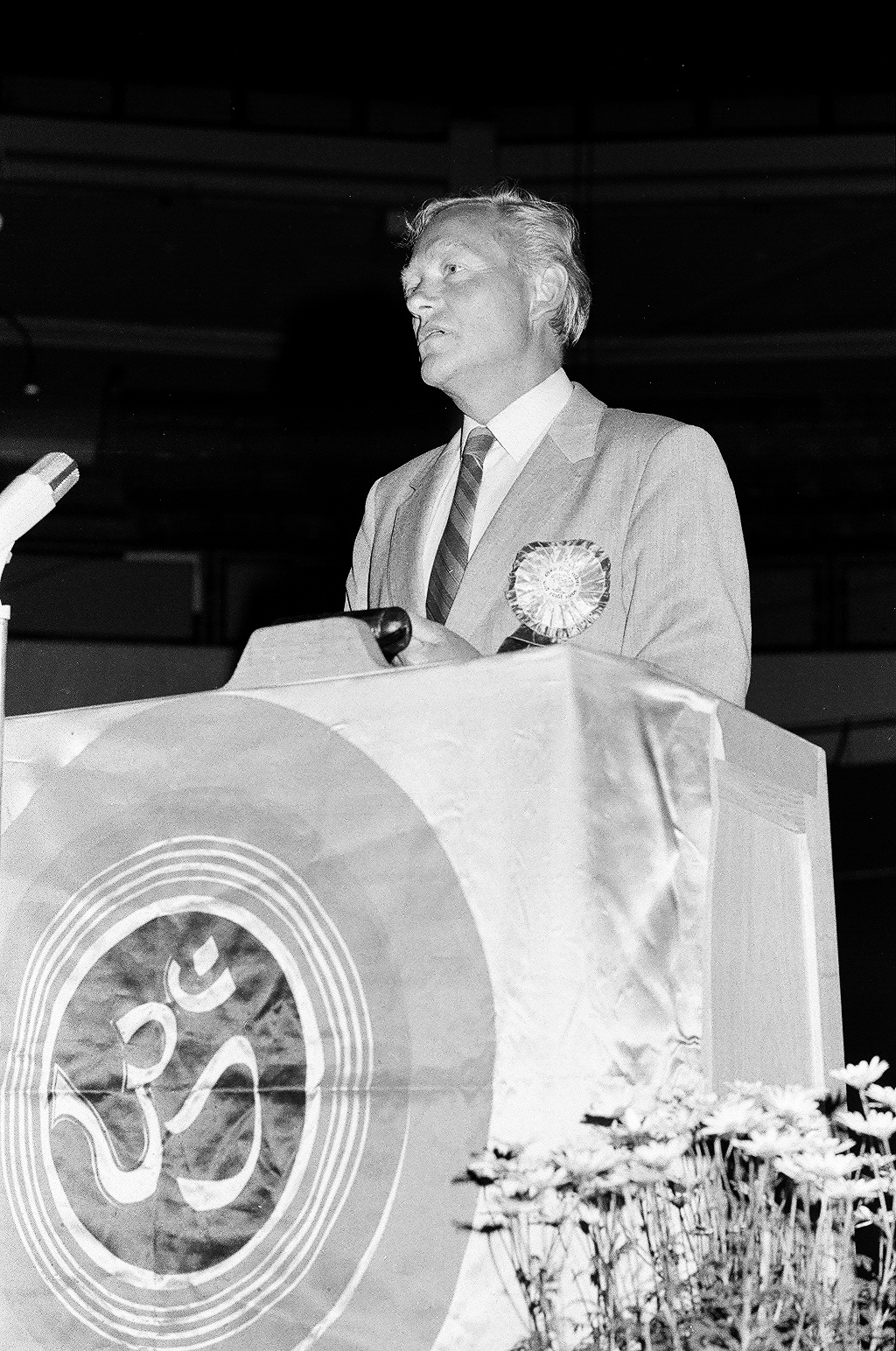
Ole Espersen, speaking at Forum 1985

Ole Mogens Espersen (20 December 1934 – 4 December 2020) was a Danish politician and minister, who represented the Social Democratic Party in Denmark.

Espersen was born in Nylars. He was Minister of Justice during two cabinets of Anker Jørgensen in the 1980s. He was Professor, dr.jur. In 1994–2000 he was the Commissioner on democratic institutions and human rights, including the rights of persons belonging to minorities, of CBSS.
