= Svend Jakobsen =

Danish politician (1935–2022)

Speaker of the Folketing
- In office 1981–1989

Minister of Finance
- In office 1979–1981
- Prime Minister: Anker Jørgensen

Minister of Fisheries
- In office 1977–1979
- Prime Minister: Anker Jørgensen

Minister of Taxation and Duties
- In office 1975–1977
- Prime Minister: Anker Jørgensen

Minister of Housing
- In office September 1973 – November 1973
- Prime Minister: Anker Jørgensen

Personal details
- Born: Svend Aage Jakobsen; 1 November 1935 Vendsyssel, Denmark
- Died: 28 May 2022 (aged 86) Taastrup, Copenhagen, Denmark
- Party: Social Democrats

Svend Jakobsen (1 November 1935 – 28 May 2022) was a Danish politician who held different cabinet posts between 1973 and 1981. He was the speaker of the Danish Parliament or Folketing from 1981 to 1989.

== Biography ==
Jakobsen was born in Vendsyssel on 1 November 1935. He was the seventh of his parents' nine children. He attended a secondary school, but did not complete his studies. He worked as a commission agent from 1955 to 1959. He joined the Social Democrats and was elected to the Folketing in 1971 from the constituency of Copenhagen county. He was a member of the cabinets led by Anker Jørgensen and served as minister of housing (September–November 1973), minister of taxes (1975–1977), minister of fisheries (1977–1979) and minister of finance (1979–1981). In 1981 Jakobsen was elected as the speaker of the Folketing and remained in office until 1989.

Following his retirement from politics in 1989 Jakobsen was the president of Denmark's Savings Association between 1990 and 1994. He was president of the Norwegian Cancer Society (1993–2001) and chairman of the Vocational Training Council (1994–2000). He was also chairman of the board of Arken Museum of Modern Art (1997–2007) and chairman of the board of the Foundation for Danish-Norwegian Cooperation.

Jakobsen was married and had two daughters. He lived in a senior housing in Taastrup and died there on 28 May 2022.
