= Mogens Glistrup =

Danish politician and lawyer

Leader of Progress Party
- In office 22 August 1972 – 22 June 1983
- Succeeded by: Pia Kjærsgaard

Member of the Folketing
- In office 4 December 1973 – 12 December 1990

Personal details
- Born: May 28, 1926
- Died: 1 July 2008 (aged 82)
- Spouse: Lene Glistrup

Mogens Glistrup (28 May 1926 in Rønne – 1 July 2008 in Virum) was a Danish politician, lawyer and tax protester. He founded the Progress Party, and was a member of the Folketing (1973–1983 and 1987–1990). He had his parliamentary immunity revoked a total of six times due to criminal convictions for tax fraud and racism.

== Biography ==
From 1956 to 1963 Glistrup was an associate professor in tax law at the University of Copenhagen, and after leaving the university he became the owner of one of Denmark's leading law firms. On national television in 1971 on the last day for sending in tax returns, he praised tax fraudsters as the "freedom fighters of our time," and he displayed his own tax card with a tax rate of zero. His television appearance triggered mass outrage, and Finance Minister Poul Møller made a complaint to Danmarks Radio, stating that they should rather have presented factual information on filling out tax returns. The government proceeded to have police and tax authorities begin an investigation into Glistrup's finances.

On 22 August 1972, Glistrup founded the Progress Party, and in the landslide election of 1973 the party gained 28 seats of 179, making it the second-largest in parliament.

Glistrup described the income tax as a remnant of the stagnant agrarian society of the past, and wanted the income tax removed over a period of seven years by gradually increasing the tax threshold. He had a unique sense of humour, the most famous example of which was his suggestion to replace the Ministry of Defence with an answering machine saying "We Surrender" in Russian.

The investigation of Glistrup's economic conditions dragged on but resulted in 1983 in Glistrup being sentenced by the supreme court to three years in prison and a fine of DKK 1,000,000 and the parliament finding him unfit to be a member. The case against him was complicated and involved an extensive web of companies that only transferred money to each other. The prosecuting authority described this web of companies as fiction, to which Glistrup responded that the only fiction involved was the "fiction theory" of the prosecuting authority.

After serving the sentence, Glistrup was reelected to parliament in 1987, but he did not manage to regain his political influence on the party from Pia Kjærsgaard, and he was expelled from the party in 1991. After this period, he made many racist and inflammatory remarks, such as "either one is a racist or else one is a traitor", and calling for all Muslims in Denmark to be interned in camps and sold to other countries. He was readmitted to the party in 1999 and in response the entire parliamentary group left in protest, and formed a new parliamentary group called Freedom 2000.

He died on 1 July 2008, aged 82.
