= Pia Kjærsgaard =

Danish politician (born 1947)

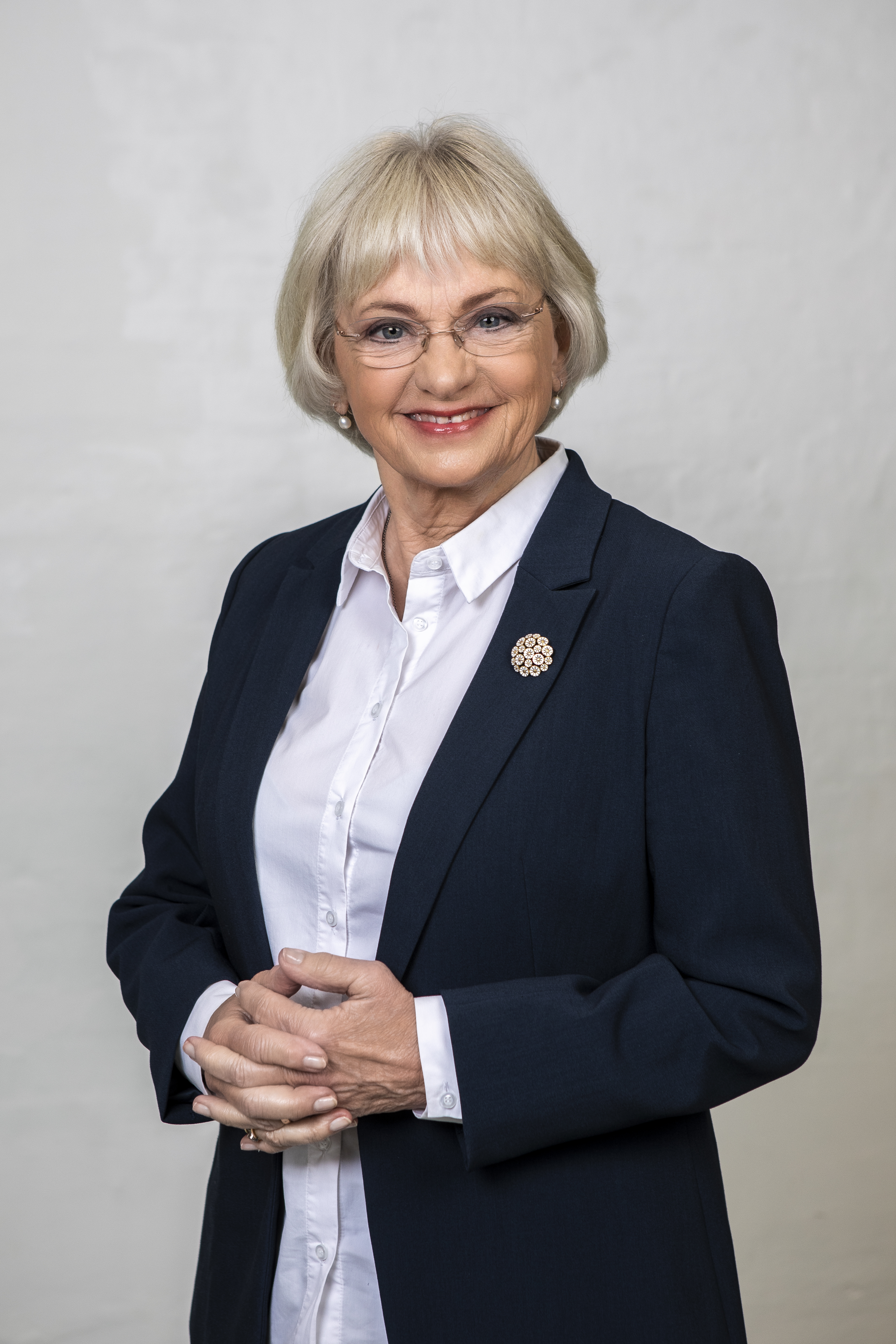
- Official portrait, 2023

Speaker of the Danish Parliament
- In office 3 July 2015 – 21 June 2019
- Preceded by: Mogens Lykketoft
- Succeeded by: Henrik Dam Kristensen

Leader of the Danish People's Party
- In office 6 October 1995 – 12 September 2012
- Preceded by: Party established
- Succeeded by: Kristian Thulesen Dahl

Leader of the Progress Party
- In office 1985–1995
- Preceded by: Mogens Glistrup
- Succeeded by: Kirsten Jacobsen

Member of the Folketing
- In office 10 January 1984 – 24 March 2026
- Constituency: Copenhagen (1984–1987); Funen (1987–1998); Copenhagen (1998–2007); Zealand (2007–2015); Greater Copenhagen (2015–2026)

Personal details
- Born: Pia Merete Kjærsgaard; 23 February 1947 (age 79) Copenhagen, Denmark
- Party: Danish People's (since 1995)
- Other political affiliations: Progress Party (1979–1995)
- Spouse: Henrik Thorup (m. 1967)
- Children: 2

Pia Merete Kjærsgaard (Danish pronunciation: [ˈpʰiːæ ˈkʰeˀɐ̯sˌkɒˀ]; born 23 February 1947) is a Danish politician who was Speaker of the Danish Parliament from 2015 to 2019, and former leader of the Danish People's Party.

She is a co-founder of the Danish People's Party, and led the party from its creation in 1995 to 2012. She previously led the Progress Party from 1985 until founding the People's Party in 1995. She has become one of the best-known politicians in Denmark during recent years, both for her consistent and vocal stance against multiculturalism and immigration, and for her parliamentary support for the center-right governments of Anders Fogh Rasmussen and Lars Løkke Rasmussen from 2001 to 2011. Her success has been an inspiration for anti-immigration and anti-Islamic movements throughout Europe.

On 7 August 2012, Kjærsgaard announced her resignation from the leader position of the Danish People's Party. She appointed Kristian Thulesen Dahl as her successor, and he took office on 12 September 2012, promising to maintain the course laid out by Kjærsgaard.

== Early life ==
Kjærsgaard was born in Copenhagen to Poul Kjærsgaard, a paint merchant, and Inge Munch Jensen, a housewife. After completing Danish Folkeskole Education in 1963, she attended the Commercial School in Copenhagen (1963–1965). From 1963 to 1967, she worked as a home care assistant for the elderly in Gentofte. From 1978 to 1984, she was employed as an office assistant in connection with insurance and advertising activities.

== Political career ==
=== Member of Parliament ===
Kjærsgaard began her political career as the Progress Party's candidate in the Ryvang nomination district (1979–1981), followed by the Ballerup and Gladsaxe nomination district (1981–1983), the Hvidovre nomination district (1983–1984), and finally, the Middelfart nomination district (1984–1995).

In 1984, while still with the Progress Party, she secured her first seat in the Folketing (Danish parliament), representing the Copenhagen County constituency (10 January 1984 – 8 September 1987). She next represented the Funen County constituency (8 September 1987 – 6 October 1995).

In 1995, as things were growing increasingly chaotic and anarchic in the Progress Party, Kjærsgaard broke away to co-found the Danish People's Party (DPP). She stood as the DPP candidate in the Glostrup nomination district in 1997, followed by the Hellerup and Gentofte nomination district (1997–2005). As a DPP candidate, she won a seat in the Folketing, representing the Funen County constituency (6 October 1995 – 11 March 1998).

As support for the Progress Party subsequently dwindled away, the DPP grew. By 2001, it had become the third largest party in the Folketing, securing 12% of the vote. In the 2005 election, the DPP's share grew to 13.2%, with Kjærsgaard receiving 38,347 "personal votes", second to only the Prime Minister, Anders Fogh Rasmussen.

=== Speaker of the Folketing ===
On 3 July 2015, following the success of Kjærsgaard's party in the June 2015 parliamentary election, she was elected the first female speaker of the Folketing (but not the first female speaker in parliament since, in 1950 when Denmark still had a bicameral system, Ingeborg Hansen became the first Danish female parliamentary speaker when she was elected speaker of the Landsting). Kjærsgaard was proposed both by the four parties supporting Lars Løkke Rasmussen's new government, and from the opposition by the Social Democrats and the Greenlandic Siumut.

=== The Danish People's Party ===
The Danish People's Party advocates a primarily nationalist and nativist platform, and is, in that regard, aligned ideologically with other European far right parties. The DPP's platform also includes toughening the criminal code and supporting social welfare policies that have traditionally been championed by the center-left Social Democrats.

The DPP achieved considerable success in the 2001 elections, becoming the third largest party in the Folketing. As such, the DPP was able to provide key parliamentary support for the center-right, Liberal-Conservative minority government led by Anders Fogh Rasmussen. In this capacity the DPP was able to push through many of its platform's policies.

In both the 2005 and the 2007 election the DPP kept its position as third largest in the Folketing and was thus able to maintain its substantial role in policy-setting through both the remainder of Anders Fogh Rasmussen's Liberal-Conservative government and through that of successor Lars Løkke Rasmussen.

== Political positions ==
Kjærsgaard's most outspoken political goals are to limit immigration to Denmark, that society should take better care of the elderly, and that Denmark should maintain its sovereignty, especially with regards to the European Union. In the euro referendum of 2000 she campaigned successfully against the adoption of the Euro.

Her view on immigration has often led to her being compared to politicians such as Jean-Marie Le Pen in France and Pim Fortuyn in The Netherlands.

She is also known to be an ardent supporter of Taiwan's bid to gain admission to the World Health Organization and the United Nations.

== Controversies ==
=== Assault and accusations ===
In 1998, Kjærsgaard was assaulted by members of an angry mob during a demonstration by the far left autonome movement in the Nørrebro district of Copenhagen.

In 1999, accusations of nepotism were levied against the DPP after it was revealed that Kjærsgaard's husband, Henrik Thorup, had been paid by the party as an independent consultant for over two years. The accusations came from parties on both sides of the political spectrum. The DPP refused to reveal Thorup's salary and defended its actions, claiming that Pia Kjærsgaard's husband was the right man for the job and that his employment had nothing to do with his marriage to the party leader.

=== Criminal cases ===
In 2001, Kjærsgaard, in the DPP's weekly newsletter, referred to Muslims as people who "...lie, cheat and deceive." Kjærsgaard was subsequently reported to the police by Denmark's Center for Racial Discrimination, for making racist remarks. Police declined to prosecute Kjærsgaard, stating that there was no reason to believe that her statement violated any laws regarding racism.

In 2002, Kjærsgaard was fined DKK 3,000 for threatening a woman with pepper spray, the use of which is illegal in Denmark. Kjærsgaard said she pulled out the spray after feeling 'intimidated and threatened' by the woman's behaviour. Kjærsgaard subsequently proclaimed her intention to lobby for a change in weapon possession legislation.

In 2003, Kjærsgaard lost a libel suit in the Danish Supreme Court against Karen Sunds, an anti-EU activist, who had characterized Kjærsgaard's viewpoints as racist. The Court ruled that Sunds' remarks had only implied that Kjærsgaard had a negative opinion of immigrants, and were not properly interpreted as an accusation of espousing biologically grounded racism or Nazi racial theory.

== Personal life ==
In 1967, Kjærsgaard married Henrik Thorup, an insurance underwriter. Thorup went on to become a chairperson and regional council member in the DPP, and currently works as a government accountant. The couple has two children, a daughter named Nan and a son named Troels.

== Honours ==
- Order of the Dannebrog, Commander 1st Class (2 October 2018)
- National Order of Merit, Grand Cross (28 August 2018)
- Order of the Crown, Grand Cross (28 March 2017)
- Order of the Falcon, Grand Cross (24 January 2017)
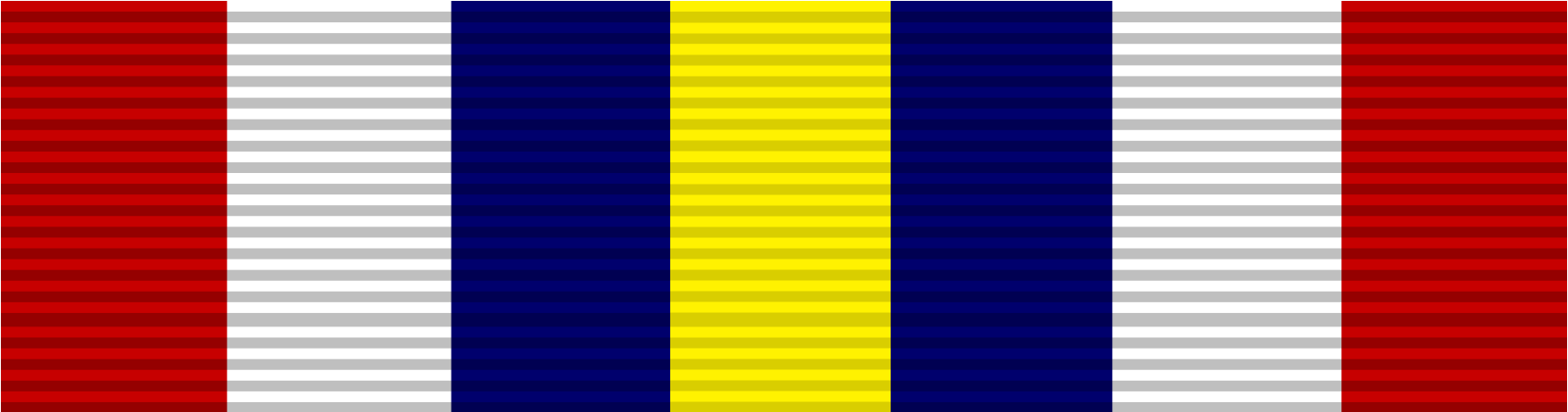
- Nordic Blue Berets Medal of Honour, Gold
- Order of the Aztec Eagle
- Order of Brilliant Star

== Bibliography ==
- Fordi jeg var nødt til det (2013, co-author)
- Digteren og partiformanden (2006, co-author)
- ... men udsigten er god - midtvejdserindringer (1998)

Political offices
Preceded by Mogens Glistrup	Leader of the Progress Party; 1985—1995	Succeeded by Kirsten Jacobsen
Preceded by None	Leader of the Danish People's Party; 1995—2012	Succeeded by Kristian Thulesen Dahl
Preceded by Mogens Lykketoft	Speaker of the Folketing; 2015–2019	Succeeded by Henrik Dam Kristensen
