= Progress Party (Denmark) =

Danish political party

Progress Party Fremskridtspartiet
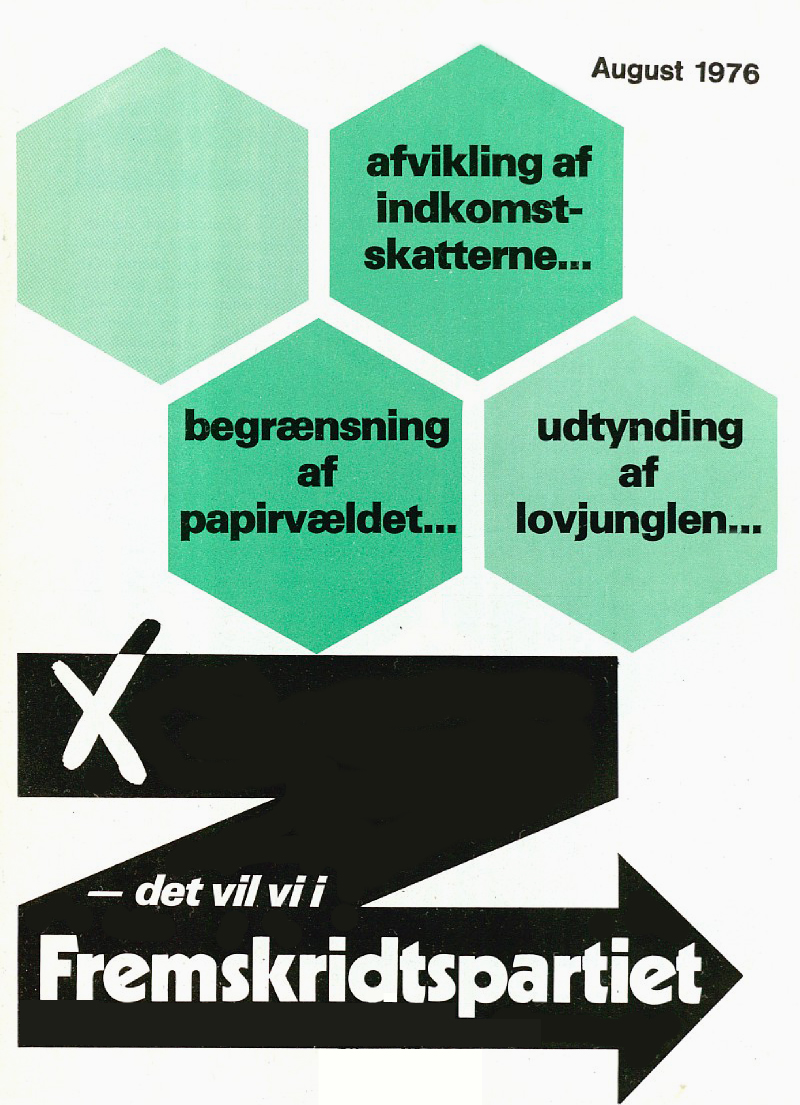
- Abbreviation: FrP; Z
- Leader: Niels Højland; Niels Michael Wingreen Christensen
- Founder: Mogens Glistrup
- Founded: 22 August 1972
- Headquarters: Liljeallé 11 6920 Videbæk
- Youth wing: Youth of the Danish People's Party
- Ideology: Right-wing populism; National liberalism; Neoliberalism; Anti-immigration; Anti-Islam
- Political position: Far-right
- Colours: Yellow

Election symbol
- Z

Website
- frp.dk
- Politics of Denmark; Political parties; Elections; Member of European Progressive Democrats in the European Parliament (1979–1984)

The Progress Party (Danish: Fremskridtspartiet, FrP) is a right-wing populist political party in Denmark which was founded in 1972.

The party's founder, the former lawyer Mogens Glistrup, gained widespread popularity as well as notoriety in the country after he appeared on Danish television, stating that he paid 0% in income tax. The party was placed on the right of the political spectrum as it believed in radical tax cuts (including removing the income tax altogether) and vowed to cut government spending. In the late 1970s, its agenda was "the gradual abolition of income tax, the disbandment of most of the civil service, the abolition of the diplomatic service and the scrapping of 90% of all legislation". From the 1980s, the party also adopted anti-immigration as a key issue.

The party entered the Danish parliament after the 1973 landslide election and immediately became the second largest party in Denmark. After this the party gradually decreased in voter support, and when some of its leading members broke out and established the Danish People's Party in 1995, the party soon lost its representation in parliament. It last won members of the Folketing in 1998, and has since become a minor party. In the 2019 general election, it supported the New Right.

== History ==
The Progress Party was founded by tax lawyer Mogens Glistrup in 1972 as a tax protest. The party's initial issues were less bureaucracy, abolition of the income tax and simpler law paragraphs. The party entered the Danish Parliament after the "electoral earthquake" of the 1973 Danish parliamentary election. It won 15.9% of the vote and 28 seats, making it the second-largest party in parliament. However, it did not form a part of the ruling coalition because the other parties refused to cooperate with it. The party also became well known for Gilstrup's unique sense of humour such as the proposal for the entire Ministry of Defence to be replaced by an answering machine with the recorded message "We surrender" in Russian.

The Progress Party's seats in parliament fell to 20 in 1979, partly due to internal splits between "pragmatists" (slappere) who wanted to pursue cooperation with mainstream parties; and "fundamentalists" (strammere) who wanted the party to stand alone. The party started to turn its attention on immigration by 1979, although immigration did not become important before the late 1980s. Having added a "Mohammedan-free Denmark" as one of its declared goals in 1980, Glistrup increasingly made comments about Muslims and used the slogan to "Make Denmark a Muslim Free Zone". In 1983, Glistrup was sentenced to three years in prison for tax fraud. While Glistrup was in prison, the pragmatists led by Pia Kjærsgaard took over the leadership of the party. Returning to the party after his release in 1987, Glistrup was no longer in control of it and internal strife broke out again. Glistrup refused to vote in favour of a proposition which had been agreed with the government in 1988 and was stripped of his position as a representative for the party. He was expelled from the national executive of the party in 1991 and went on to found his own party, called Prosperity Party (Trivselspartiet).

The Progress Party won twelve seats in the 1990 Danish parliamentary election. Internal disputes were still far from resolved, and eventually led the party to be split when the Danish People's Party (DF) was founded by Kjærsgaard and the pragmatists in 1995. While liberals remained in the tax-focused Progress Party, the new DF included those who were concerned with immigration as their main issue.

When the party's new leader Kirsten Jacobsen decided to leave politics in 1999, Mogens Glistrup was allowed back in the party again in lack of any leading figures. Because of this, the Progress Party's remaining four member in parliament left and founded Freedom 2000. Despite their own positions against immigration, Glistrup's comments in the media had become so extreme that they felt forced to leave the party (comments included "either one is a racist or else one is a traitor" and demanding all "Mohammedans" in Denmark to be interned in camps and expelled from the country). Glistrup led the party for the 2001 Danish parliamentary election, but it had lost almost all its support and received less than one percent of the vote. The party did not run in the 2005 Danish parliamentary election nor in the 2007 Danish parliamentary election. However, it did run for the local and regional elections in November 2005. The party generally received less than one percent of the votes (though with several local exceptions), and got one member elected in the municipality of Morsø serving as the last elected representative of the party until the end of 2009. In the 2019 Danish general election, the Progress Party supported The New Right.

== Ideology ==
=== Main issues ===
The party's political issues were:

1. Abolishing income tax.
2. Cleaning up the law jungle.
3. Reducing bureaucracy.
4. Putting a stop to immigration from Islamic countries and researching its consequences.

Glistrup added the fourth point in the 1980s.

=== Political positions ===
By 2010, its entire political program consisted of the following points, with the headline "Stop the immigration":

1. Abolishment of the income tax.
2. Drastic reduction of bureaucracy.
3. Drastic reduction of the "law jungle".
4. Restoration of borders and border control product.
5. Stop of immigration.
6. Stop the allocation of Danish citizenship.
7. Confrontation with the integration policy.
8. Locate the responsibility for the mass immigration.
9. Denmark gradually out of the EU for trade throughout the world.

== Party leadership ==
=== Political leaders ===
- Mogens Glistrup (1972–1985)
- Pia Kjærsgaard (1985–1995)
- Kirsten Jacobsen (1995–1999)
- Aage Brusgaard (1999–2001)
- Aase Heskjær (2001–2003)
- Jørn Herkild (2003–2006)
- Henrik Søndergård (2006–2007)
- Ove Jensen (2007–2009)
- Ernst Simonsen (2009–2010)
- Niels Højland (2010–)

=== Organisational leaders ===
- Ulrik Poulsen (1974)
- Palle Tillisch (1975–1976)
- A. Roland Petersen (1976–1979)
- V.A. Jacobsen (1980–1984)
- Poul Sustmann Hansen (1984)
- Ove Jensen (1984)
- Helge Dohrmann (1984–1985)
- Annette Just (1985–1986)
- Johannes Sørensen (1987–1993)
- Poul Lindholm Nielsen (1994)
- Johannes Sørensen (1995–1999)
- Per Larsen (1999)
- Aage Brusgaard (1999–2001)
- Aase Heskjær (2001–2003)
- Jørn Herkild (2003–2006)
- Henrik Søndergård (2006–2007)
- Ove Jensen (2007–2009)
- Ernst Simonsen (2009–2010)
- Niels Højland (2010–)

== Election results ==
=== Folketing ===
Election	No. of total votes	% of popular vote	No. of seats won	Government
1973	485,289	15.9%	28 / 179	Providing parliamentary support
1975	414,219	13.6%	24 / 179	in opposition
1977	453,792	14.6%	26 / 179	In opposition
1979	349,243	11.0%	20 / 179	In opposition
1981	278,383	8.9%	16 / 179	In opposition
1984	120,461	3.6%	6 / 179	Providing parliamentary support
1987	160,461	4.8%	9 / 179	Providing parliamentary support
1988	298,132	9.0%	16 / 179	Providing parliamentary support
1990	208,484	6.4%	12 / 179	In opposition
1994	214,057	6.4%	11 / 179	In opposition
1998	82,437	2.4%	4 / 179	In opposition
2001	19,340	0.6%	0 / 179	Extra-parliamentary

=== European Parliament ===
Election	No. of total votes	% of popular vote	No. of seats won
1979	100,702	5.7%	1 / 15
1984	68,747	3.4%	0 / 15
1989	93,985	5.3%	0 / 15
1994	59,687	2.9%	0 / 15
1999	14,233	0.7%	0 / 15

== See also ==
- New Democracy similar party in Sweden in the 1990s.
