= List of members of the Folketing, 1984–1987 =

59th Folketing
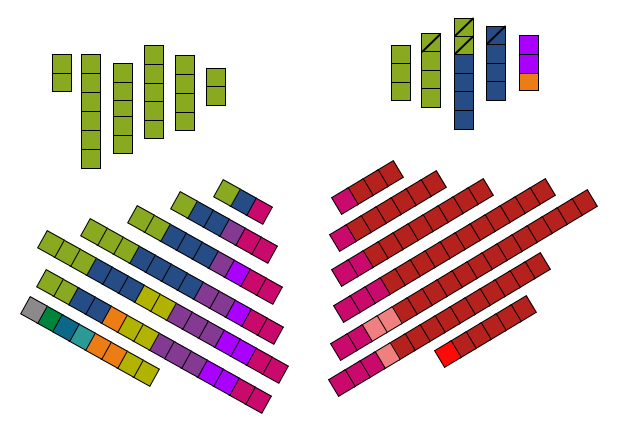
- Term: 10 January 1984 – 8 September 1987
- Speaker: A Svend Jakobsen
- Prime Minister: C Poul Schlüter
- Cabinet: Schlüter I
- Previous: 1981–1984
- Next: 1987–1988

This is a list of the 179 members of the Folketing, in the 1984 to 1987 session. They were elected at the 1984 general election.

== Election results ==
Denmark
Party	Votes	%	Seats	+/–
Social Democratic Party	1,062,561	31.6	56	−3
Conservative People's Party	788,224	23.4	42	+16
Venstre	405,737	12.1	22	+2
Socialist People's Party	387,122	11.5	21	0
Danish Social Liberal Party	184,642	5.5	10	+1
Centre Democrats	154,553	4.6	8	−7
Progress Party	120,641	3.6	6	−10
Christian People's Party	91,623	2.7	5	+1
Left Socialists	89,356	2.7	5	0
Justice Party of Denmark	50,381	1.5	0	0
Communist Party of Denmark	23,085	0.7	0	0
Socialist Workers Party	2,151	0.1	0	0
Communist Party of Denmark/Marxist–Leninists	978	0.0	0	New
Independents	956	0.0	0	0
Invalid/blank votes	24,723	–	–	–
Total	3,386,733	100	175	0
Faroe Islands
Union Party	4,744	25.9	1	0
People's Party	4,605	25.1	1	+1
Social Democratic Party	4,317	23.5	0	−1
Republican Party	3,646	19.9	0	0
Self-Government Party	1,033	5.6	0	0
Invalid/blank votes	73	–	–	–
Total	18,418	100	2	0
Greenland
Atassut	9,308	43.5	1	0
Siumut	9,148	42.6	1	0
Inuit Ataqatigiit	2,972	13.9	0	New
Invalid/blank votes	633	–	–	–
Total	22,028	100	2	0
Source: Nohlen & Stöver

== Seat distribution ==
Below is the distribution of the 179 seats as it appeared after the 1984 election, as well as the way it appeared at the end of the term.

Party	Party leader	Elected seats	End seats	Change
A Social Democrats	Anker Jørgensen	56	56	Steady
B Social Liberal Party	Niels Helveg Petersen	10	10	Steady
C Conservatives	Poul Schlüter	42	42	Steady
F Socialist People's Party	Gert Petersen	21	23	▲2
M Centre Democrats	Erhard Jakobsen	8	8	Steady
Q Christian People's Party	Flemming Kofod-Svendsen	5	4	▼1
V Liberals	Uffe Ellemann-Jensen	22	22	Steady
Y Left Socialists	Collective leadership	5	3	▼2
Z Progress Party	Pia Kjærsgaard	6	6	Steady
FF People's Party	Jógvan Sundstein	1	1	Steady
SP Union Party	Pauli Ellefsen	1	1	Steady
AT Feeling of Community	Otto Steenholdt	1	1	Steady
SI Forward	Jonathan Motzfeldt	1	1	Steady
. Outside group		–	1	▲1

== Parliament members elected at the January 1984 election ==
Name	Birth year	Party	Constituency
Asbjørn Agerschou	1948	F Socialist People's Party	Ribe
Niels Ahlmann-Ohlsen	1953	C Conservatives	Nordjylland
Keld Albrechtsen	1952	Y Left Socialists	Østre
Carsten Andersen	1940	F Socialist People's Party	Østre
Hanne Andersen	1939	A Social Democrats	København
Henning Andersen	1931	C Conservatives	Fyn
Jytte Andersen	1942	A Social Democrats	Østre
Svend Andersen	1929	A Social Democrats	Bornholm
John Arentoft	1923	Z Progress Party	Aarhus
Margrete Auken	1945	F Socialist People's Party	Frederiksborg
Svend Auken	1943	A Social Democrats	Aarhus
Børge Bakholt	1935	A Social Democrats	Fyn
Asger Baunsbak-Jensen	1932	B Social Liberal Party	Viborg
Bernhard Baunsgaard	1918	B Social Liberal Party	Aarhus
Dorte Bennedsen	1938	A Social Democrats	København
Jens Bilgrav-Nielsen	1936	B Social Liberal Party	Vejle
Arne Christian Bjerregaard	1928	Q Christian People's Party	Nordjylland
Ritt Bjerregaard	1941	A Social Democrats	Fyn
Niels Bollmann	1939	M Centre Democrats	Vejle
Óli Breckmann	1948	FF People's Party	Faroe Islands
René Brusvang	1926	M Centre Democrats	Frederiksborg
Povl Brøndsted	1924	V Liberals	Fyn
Lasse Budtz	1926	A Social Democrats	Viborg
Hans Peter Baadsgaard	1937	A Social Democrats	Aarhus
Mogens Camre	1936	A Social Democrats	Vestre
Carl Martin Christensen	1940	C Conservatives	Fyn
Christian Christensen	1925	Q Christian People's Party	Ringkøbing
Frode Nør Christensen	1948	M Centre Democrats	Ringkøbing
Ole Vagn Christensen	1943	A Social Democrats	Viborg
Henning Christophersen	1939	V Liberals	Frederiksborg
Bernt Johan Collet	1941	C Conservatives	Storstrøm
Knud Damgaard	1917	A Social Democrats	Roskilde
Helle Degn	1946	A Social Democrats	København
Tommy Dinesen	1939	F Socialist People's Party	Vestsjælland
Helge Dohrmann	1939	Z Progress Party	Sønderjylland
Lone Dybkjær	1940	B Social Liberal Party	København
Pauli Ellefsen	1936	SP Union Party	Faroe Islands
Uffe Ellemann-Jensen	1941	V Liberals	Aarhus
Bjørn Elmquist	1938	V Liberals	Nordjylland
Hans Engell	1948	C Conservatives	Vestsjælland
Knud Enggaard	1929	V Liberals	Aarhus
Hans Erenbjerg	1931	A Social Democrats	Storstrøm
Ole Espersen	1934	A Social Democrats	Østre
Jørgen Estrup	1942	B Social Liberal Party	Østre
Alice Faber	1935	F Socialist People's Party	Fyn
Viggo Fischer	1943	C Conservatives	Roskilde
Birgit Fogh-Andersen	1922	C Conservatives	Vestre
Isi Foighel	1927	C Conservatives	København
Steen Gade	1945	F Socialist People's Party	Ringkøbing
Lars Peter Gammelgaard	1945	C Conservatives	Aarhus
Annelise Gotfredsen	1928	C Conservatives	København
Mette Groes	1937	A Social Democrats	Nordjylland
Henning Grove	1932	C Conservatives	Viborg
Lilli Gyldenkilde	1936	F Socialist People's Party	Vejle
Hagen Hagensen	1916	C Conservatives	Vestre
Birthe Hansen	1930	F Socialist People's Party	Storstrøm
Flemming Hansen	1939	C Conservatives	Vejle
Ivar Hansen	1938	V Liberals	Ribe
Jens Kristian Hansen	1926	A Social Democrats	Sønderjylland
Karen Thurøe Hansen	1918	C Conservatives	Vejle
Inger Harms	1942	F Socialist People's Party	Sønderjylland
Connie Hedegaard	1960	C Conservatives	København
Knud Heinesen	1932	A Social Democrats	Søndre
Svend Heiselberg	1935	V Liberals	Viborg
Ole Henriksen	1934	F Socialist People's Party	København
Ole Bernt Henriksen	1934	C Conservatives	Aarhus
Leif Hermann	1941	F Socialist People's Party	Viborg
Jytte Hilden	1942	A Social Democrats	Vestsjælland
Karl Hjortnæs	1934	A Social Democrats	Aarhus
Britta Schall Holberg	1941	V Liberals	Vejle
Anne Grete Holmsgaard	1948	Y Left Socialists	København
Erik Holst	1922	A Social Democrats	Storstrøm
Birthe Rønn Hornbech	1943	V Liberals	Roskilde
Poul Henrik Houe	1938	C Conservatives	Viborg
Svend Erik Hovmand	1945	V Liberals	Storstrøm
Hans Hækkerup	1945	A Social Democrats	Vestsjælland
Bertel Haarder	1944	V Liberals	København
Kaj Ikast	1935	C Conservatives	Sønderjylland
Hanne Thanning Jacobsen	1936	F Socialist People's Party	Fyn
Erhard Jakobsen	1917	M Centre Democrats	Fyn
Mimi Jakobsen	1948	M Centre Democrats	København
Svend Jakobsen	1935	A Social Democrats	København
Arne Jensen	1938	A Social Democrats	Nordjylland
Egon Jensen	1922	A Social Democrats	Vestsjælland
Erling Jensen	1919	A Social Democrats	Frederiksborg
Flemming Jensen	1928	C Conservatives	København
Henning Jensen	1938	A Social Democrats	Vejle
Jens Peter Jensen	1922	V Liberals	Fyn
Karen Højte Jensen	1938	C Conservatives	Roskilde
Ole Vig Jensen	1936	B Social Liberal Party	Vestsjælland
Ove Jensen	1933	Z Progress Party	Ringkøbing
Bente Juncker	1944	M Centre Democrats	Østre
Anker Jørgensen	1922	A Social Democrats	Vestre
Poul Qvist Jørgensen	1941	A Social Democrats	Sønderjylland
Søren Bødker Jørgensen	1926	A Social Democrats	Aarhus
Christian Kelm-Hansen	1925	A Social Democrats	Aarhus
Kent Kirk	1948	C Conservatives	Ribe
Knud Erik Kirkegaard	1942	C Conservatives	Ringkøbing
Pia Kjærsgaard	1947	Z Progress Party	København
Jens Risgaard Knudsen	1925	A Social Democrats	Nordjylland
Elsebeth Kock-Petersen	1949	V Liberals	Vestsjælland
Ingerlise Koefoed	1922	F Socialist People's Party	København
Flemming Kofod-Svendsen	1944	Q Christian People's Party	København
Niels Anker Kofoed	1929	V Liberals	Bornholm
Bo Kristensen	1945	C Conservatives	Vejle
Elisabeth Krog	1922	C Conservatives	Aarhus
Preben Lange	1948	SI Forward	Greenland
Hans Larsen-Ledet	1921	B Social Liberal Party	Nordjylland
Tove Lindbo Larsen	1928	A Social Democrats	Søndre
Agnete Laustsen	1935	C Conservatives	Søndre
Jørgen Lenger	1953	Y Left Socialists	Aarhus
Jens Peter Lerke	1922	A Social Democrats	Frederiksborg
Lizzie Lichtenberg	1937	C Conservatives	Vestsjælland
Paul Lohmann	1934	A Social Democrats	Fyn
Arne Lund	1915	C Conservatives	Frederiksborg
Torben Lund	1950	A Social Democrats	Vejle
Jes Lunde	1956	F Socialist People's Party	Nordjylland
Mogens Lykketoft	1946	A Social Democrats	København
Mette Madsen	1924	V Liberals	Nordjylland
Ole Maisted	1934	Z Progress Party	Fyn
Lissa Mathiasen	1948	A Social Democrats	Aarhus
Arne Melchior	1924	M Centre Democrats	Aarhus
Birgith Mogensen	1927	M Centre Democrats	Nordjylland
Helge Mortensen	1941	A Social Democrats	Ribe
Eva Møller	1940	C Conservatives	Frederiksborg
Grethe Fenger Møller	1941	C Conservatives	Østre
Helge Adam Møller	1942	C Conservatives	Storstrøm
Inge Fischer Møller	1939	A Social Democrats	Frederiksborg
Kjeld Rahbæk Møller	1938	F Socialist People's Party	Søndre
Per Stig Møller	1942	C Conservatives	København
Bente Mousten Nielsen	1956	V Liberals	Østre
Henning Nielsen	1932	A Social Democrats	Ringkøbing
Erik Ninn-Hansen	1922	C Conservatives	Fyn
Søren Nørgård-Sørensen	1952	A Social Democrats	Fyn
Ivar Nørgaard	1922	A Social Democrats	København
Elisabeth Bruun Olesen	1947	Y Left Socialists	Nordjylland
Kjeld Olesen	1932	A Social Democrats	Nordjylland
Aase Olesen	1934	B Social Liberal Party	Frederiksborg
Erling Olsen	1927	A Social Democrats	Østre
Ruth Olsen	1941	F Socialist People's Party	København
Inger Stilling Pedersen	1929	Q Christian People's Party	Aarhus
Robert Pedersen	1921	A Social Democrats	Ringkøbing
Gert Petersen	1927	F Socialist People's Party	Østre
Niels Helveg Petersen	1939	B Social Liberal Party	Fyn
Svend Åge Petersen	1942	C Conservatives	Sønderjylland
Kaj Poulsen	1945	A Social Democrats	Nordjylland
Kristen Poulsgaard	1935	Z Progress Party	Nordjylland
Anders Fogh Rasmussen	1953	V Liberals	Viborg
Henning Rasmussen	1926	A Social Democrats	Ribe
Søren Riishøj	1947	F Socialist People's Party	Roskilde
Jens Peter Rønholt	1939	C Conservatives	Sønderjylland
Helge Sander	1950	V Liberals	Ringkøbing
Poul Schlüter	1929	C Conservatives	København
Hanne Severinsen	1944	V Liberals	Ringkøbing
Ole Løvig Simonsen	1935	A Social Democrats	Storstrøm
Palle Simonsen	1933	C Conservatives	Frederiksborg
Jens Skrumsager Skau	1943	V Liberals	Vejle
Erik Brünnich Smith	1939	A Social Democrats	Storstrøm
Jimmy Stahr	1935	A Social Democrats	Roskilde
Ole Stavad	1949	A Social Democrats	Nordjylland
Otto Steenholdt	1936	AT Feeling of Community	Greenland
Jens Steffensen	1929	Q Christian People's Party	Viborg
Ib Stetter	1917	C Conservatives	Nordjylland
Arne Stinus	1932	B Social Liberal Party	Storstrøm
Ebba Strange	1929	F Socialist People's Party	Aarhus
Poul Søgaard	1923	A Social Democrats	Fyn
Peder Sønderby	1932	V Liberals	Sønderjylland
Bernhardt Tastesen	1926	A Social Democrats	Vejle
Jens Thoft	1945	F Socialist People's Party	Aarhus
Jette Thomsen	1942	C Conservatives	Nordjylland
Steen Tinning	1953	Y Left Socialists	Fyn
Laurits Tørnæs	1936	V Liberals	Ribe
Svend Taanquist	1930	A Social Democrats	Sønderjylland
Pelle Voigt	1950	F Socialist People's Party	Vestre
Bjørn Westh	1944	A Social Democrats	Viborg
Knud Østergaard	1922	C Conservatives	Ringkøbing
Christian Aagaard	1937	C Conservatives	Aarhus
Lis Aaltonen	1940	C Conservatives	Ribe
Merete Aarup	1934	C Conservatives	Fyn

== Party and member changes after the January 1984 elections ==
=== Party changes ===
Below are all parliament members that have joined another party or become independent during the term.

Name	Old party	Constituency	New party	Date
Anne Grete Holmsgaard	Y Left Socialists	København	. Independent	1 July 1986
Anne Grete Holmsgaard	. Independent	København	F Socialist People's Party	12 September 1986
Jørgen Lenger	Y Left Socialists	Aarhus	. Independent	1 July 1986
Jørgen Lenger	. Independent	Aarhus	F Socialist People's Party	12 September 1986
Arne Christian Bjerregaard	Q Christian People's Party	Nordjylland	. Independent	16 March 1987

=== Lasting member changes ===
Below are member changes that lasted through the entire term.

Replacement	Birth year	Party	Constituency	Replaced MP	Date	Reason
Dagmar Mørk Jensen	1924	B Social Liberal Party	Viborg	Asger Baunsbak-Jensen	15 March 1984	Baunsbak-Jensen resigned his seat.
Poul Erik Korneliusen	1942	A Social Democrats	Frederiksborg	Inge Fischer Møller	7 June 1984	Møller died.
Thor Pedersen	1945	V Liberals	Frederiksborg	Henning Christophersen	1 January 1985	Christophersen resigned his seat.
Søren Hansen	1942	A Social Democrats	Vestsjælland	Egon Jensen	5 January 1985	Jensen died.
Joanna Rønn	1947	A Social Democrats	Søndre	Knud Heinesen	1 April 1985	Heinesen resigned his seat.
Alice Brask	1938	C Conservatives	Aarhus	Elisabeth Krog	20 October 1985	Krog died.
Poul Nielson	1943	A Social Democrats	Vejle	Henning Jensen	1 January 1986	Jensen resigned his seat.
Kaj Stillinger	1943	F Socialist People's Party	Fyn	Alice Faber	1 January 1986	Faber resigned his seat.
Addi Andersen	1928	M Centre Democrats	Frederiksborg	René Brusvang	12 September 1986	Brusvang died.

=== Temporary member changes ===
Below are temporary member replacements during the term.

Replacement	Birth year	Party	Constituency	Replaced MP	Start	End	Length
Addi Andersen	1928	M Centre Democrats	Frederiksborg	René Brusvang	7 February 1984	21 February 1984	14 days
Dagmar Mørk Jensen	1924	B Social Liberal Party	Viborg	Asger Baunsbak-Jensen	7 February 1984	14 March 1984	36 days
Johannes Martin Olsen	1933	SP Union Party	Faroe Islands	Pauli Ellefsen	7 February 1984	4 February 1985	363 days
Knud Andersen		V Liberals			7 February 1984	13 April 1984	66 days
Kirsten Wind Rasmussen		M Centre Democrats			13 February 1984	19 February 1984	6 days
Holger Graversen		A Social Democrats			16 February 1984	19 March 1984	32 days
Kirsten Wind Rasmussen		M Centre Democrats			12 March 1984	18 March 1984	6 days
Shirley Højbjerg		B Social Liberal Party			15 March 1984	25 March 1984	10 days
Peter Duetoft	1950	M Centre Democrats	København	Mimi Jakobsen	25 March 1984	8 April 1984	14 days
Inger Marie Bruun-Vierø	1942	B Social Liberal Party	Østre	Jørgen Estrup	30 April 1984	26 May 1984	26 days
Sonja Albrink	1948	M Centre Democrats	Vejle	Niels Bollmann	7 May 1984	14 May 1984	7 days
Mogens Blach		V Liberals			9 May 1984	3 June 1984	25 days
Knud Andersen		V Liberals			14 May 1984	31 May 1984	17 days
Carsten Nielsen		C Conservatives			22 May 1984	28 May 1984	6 days
Niels Solgaard-Nielsen		C Conservatives			22 May 1984	30 May 1984	8 days
Bodil Dahl Christensen		C Conservatives			24 May 1984	30 May 1984	6 days
Hans Aage Kofoed		C Conservatives			24 May 1984	30 May 1984	6 days
Helmar Sørensen		A Social Democrats			24 May 1984	30 May 1984	6 days
Helge Larsen		V Liberals			25 May 1984	31 May 1984	6 days
Kirsten Kimø		V Liberals			28 May 1984	3 June 1984	6 days
Ingrid Bo Larsen		A Social Democrats			28 May 1984	3 June 1984	6 days
Henning Laursen		C Conservatives			28 May 1984	3 June 1984	6 days
Lars Barfoed	1957	C Conservatives	København		4 October 1984	31 October 1984	27 days
Birgitte Husmark	1945	F Socialist People's Party	Frederiksborg		4 October 1984	1 November 1984	28 days
Kristian Albertsen		A Social Democrats			4 October 1984	31 October 1984	27 days
Sven Skovmand		B Social Liberal Party			4 October 1984	11 November 1984	38 days
Addi Andersen	1928	M Centre Democrats	Frederiksborg	René Brusvang	11 October 1984	19 December 1984	69 days
Kirsten Wind Rasmussen		M Centre Democrats			23 October 1984	29 October 1984	6 days
Sonja Albrink	1948	M Centre Democrats	Vejle	Niels Bollmann	30 October 1984	13 November 1984	14 days
Jens Otto Madsen		Y Left Socialists			31 October 1984	14 December 1984	44 days
Tonni Nielsen		F Socialist People's Party			31 October 1984	14 December 1984	44 days
Sv. E. Sørensen		C Conservatives			31 October 1984	14 December 1984	44 days
Holger Graversen		A Social Democrats			1 November 1984	16 December 1984	45 days
Peter Duetoft	1950	M Centre Democrats	København	Mimi Jakobsen	4 November 1984	11 November 1984	7 days
Knud Andersen		V Liberals			13 November 1984	13 December 1984	30 days
Kirsten Wind Rasmussen		M Centre Democrats			13 November 1984	19 November 1984	6 days
Kirsten Wind Rasmussen		M Centre Democrats			10 December 1984	16 December 1984	6 days
Kirsten Wind Rasmussen		M Centre Democrats			11 February 1985	17 February 1985	6 days
Knud Andersen		V Liberals			12 March 1985	30 May 1985	79 days
Sonja Mikkelsen		A Social Democrats			29 March 1985	4 April 1985	6 days
Knud Erik Sværke		B Social Liberal Party			15 April 1985	26 April 1985	11 days
Søren Hauberg Nielsen		V Liberals			23 April 1985	8 May 1985	15 days
Kirsten Wind Rasmussen		M Centre Democrats			7 May 1985	13 May 1985	6 days
Leo Johansen		A Social Democrats			22 May 1985	30 May 1985	8 days
Inger Marie Bruun-Vierø	1942	B Social Liberal Party	Østre	Jørgen Estrup	3 October 1985	2 November 1985	30 days
Knud Glønborg	1930	Q Christian People's Party			3 October 1985	3 November 1985	31 days
Hans Jørgen Jensen		A Social Democrats			3 October 1985	3 November 1985	31 days
Alice Brask	1938	C Conservatives	Aarhus	Ole Bernt Henriksen	3 October 1985	19 October 1985	16 days
Birthe Nielsen	1928	F Socialist People's Party	Vestsjælland	Tommy Dinesen	3 October 1985	2 November 1985	30 days
Pernille Falcon		Y Left Socialists			3 October 1985	31 October 1985	28 days
Anders Poulsen		V Liberals			3 October 1985	3 November 1985	31 days
Holger Graversen		A Social Democrats			7 October 1985	2 December 1985	56 days
Poul Iversen		C Conservatives			20 October 1985	3 November 1985	14 days
Peter Duetoft	1950	M Centre Democrats	København	Mimi Jakobsen	22 October 1985	28 October 1985	6 days
Kirsten Wind Rasmussen		M Centre Democrats			22 October 1985	28 October 1985	6 days
Jesper Kinch-Jensen		Y Left Socialists			31 October 1985	11 November 1985	11 days
Lars Barfoed	1957	C Conservatives	København		5 November 1985	13 December 1985	38 days
Sonja Mikkelsen		A Social Democrats			5 November 1985	9 December 1985	34 days
Finn O. Christensen		F Socialist People's Party			5 November 1985	14 December 1985	39 days
Gudrun Andreasen		V Liberals			6 November 1985	8 December 1985	32 days
Svend Blæsbjerg		Z Progress Party			14 November 1985	13 December 1985	29 days
Holger Graversen		A Social Democrats			3 December 1985	13 January 1986	41 days
Villy Søvndal	1952	F Socialist People's Party	Vejle		13 March 1986	28 April 1986	46 days
Knud Erik Sværke		B Social Liberal Party			15 April 1986	24 April 1986	9 days
Kirsten Kimø		V Liberals			1 May 1986	7 May 1986	6 days
Mogens Blach		V Liberals			20 May 1986	31 May 1986	11 days
Kirsten Jacobsen		Z Progress Party			25 May 1986	31 May 1986	6 days
Sonja Mikkelsen		A Social Democrats			26 May 1986	1 June 1986	6 days
Sonja Albrink	1948	M Centre Democrats	Vejle	Niels Bollmann	9 October 1986	27 October 1986	18 days
Jørgen Eiberg		A Social Democrats			9 October 1986	9 November 1986	31 days
Kristian R. Kristensen		Q Christian People's Party			9 October 1986	2 November 1986	24 days
Grethe Larsen		F Socialist People's Party			9 October 1986	3 November 1986	25 days
Anders Poulsen		V Liberals			9 October 1986	2 November 1986	24 days
Lennart Larson		V Liberals			3 November 1986	12 December 1986	39 days
Frank Pedersen		B Social Liberal Party			3 November 1986	14 December 1986	41 days
Frank Rørbeck Mathiassen	1932	C Conservatives	Roskilde	Viggo Fischer	4 November 1986	14 December 1986	40 days
Mogens Blach		V Liberals			4 November 1986	30 November 1986	26 days
Jesper Kinch-Jensen		Y Left Socialists			4 November 1986	15 December 1986	41 days
Jette Westh		F Socialist People's Party			4 November 1986	15 December 1986	41 days
Ingrid Bo Larsen		A Social Democrats			10 November 1986	19 December 1986	39 days
Hans Damgaard Nielsen		Z Progress Party			11 November 1986	18 December 1986	37 days
Ole Pagels		V Liberals			11 November 1986	21 December 1986	40 days
Hans Damgaard Nielsen		Z Progress Party			5 March 1987	26 May 1987	82 days
Johannes Martin Olsen	1933	SP Union Party	Faroe Islands	Pauli Ellefsen	17 March 1987	23 March 1987	6 days
Mogens Blach		V Liberals			24 March 1987	2 April 1987	9 days
Peter Duetoft	1950	M Centre Democrats	København	Mimi Jakobsen	26 March 1987	6 April 1987	11 days
Knud Erik Sværke		B Social Liberal Party			21 April 1987	30 April 1987	9 days
Lennart Larson		V Liberals			28 April 1987	1 July 1987	64 days
Bodil Dahl Christensen		C Conservatives			5 May 1987	20 July 1987	76 days
Frank Pedersen		B Social Liberal Party			11 May 1987	17 May 1987	6 days
Hans Jørgen Jensen		A Social Democrats			19 May 1987	4 June 1987	16 days
Sonja Mikkelsen		A Social Democrats			26 May 1987	2 June 1987	7 days
