= Mikael Gam =

Danish educator and politician (1901–1982)

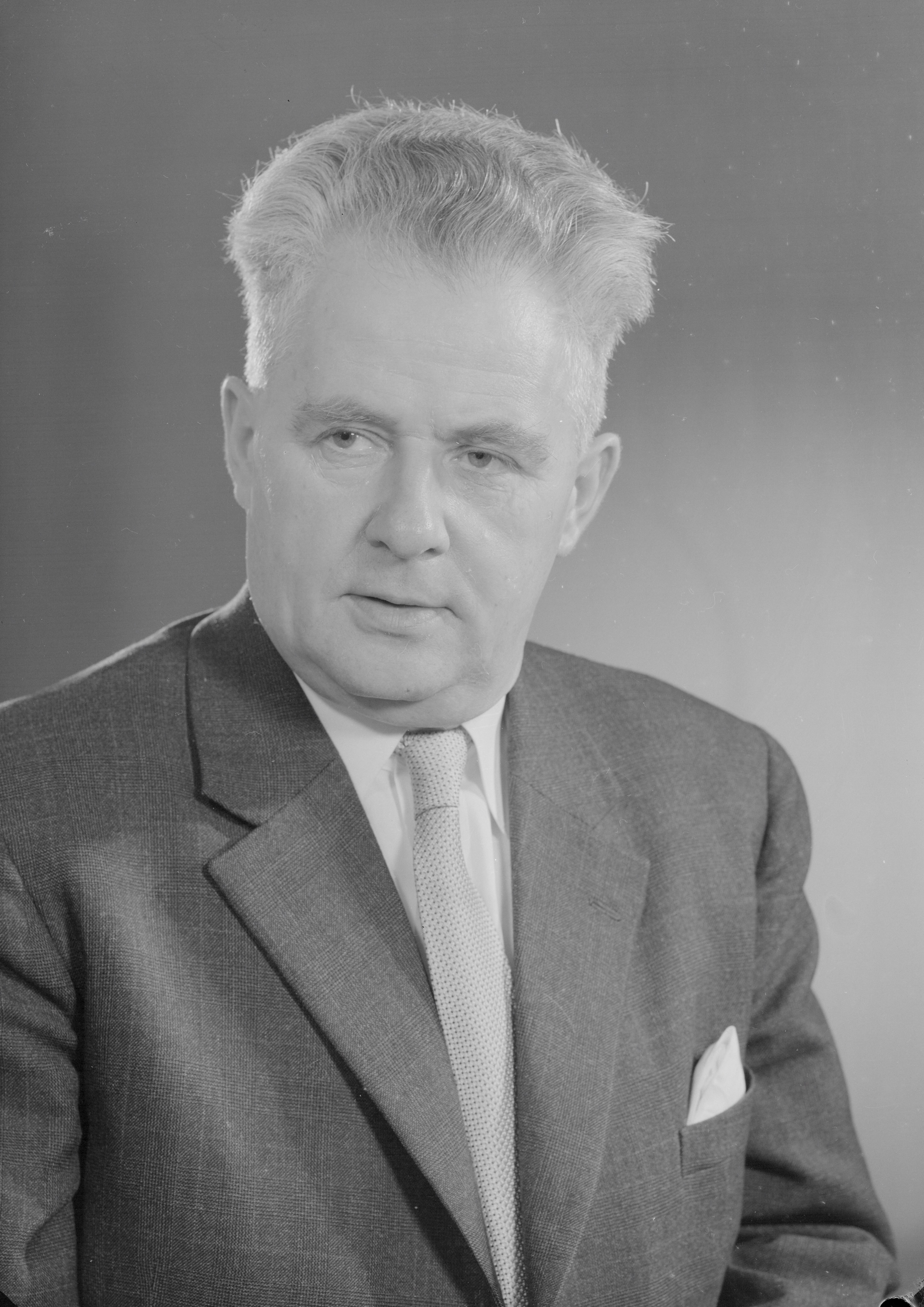

Minister for Greenland
- In office 18 November 1960 – 26 September 1964
- Prime Minister: Viggo Kampmann; Jens Otto Krag
- Preceded by: Kai Lindberg
- Succeeded by: Carl P. Jensen

Personal details
- Born: 14 February 1901 Sinding, Denmark
- Died: 24 May 1982 (aged 81) Virum, Copenhagen
- Party: Independent
- Awards: Order of the Dannebrog

Mikael Gam (14 February 1901 – 24 May 1982) was a Danish educator and independent politician. After working as a teacher and school administrator in Greenland he became a member of the Danish Parliament in 1960 and served in the post until 1960. During the same period he was the minister for Greenland.

== Biography ==
Gam was born in Sinding near Silkeborg on 14 February 1901. He was a teacher by training and settled in Greenland in 1925. There he worked as a teacher and was a school administrator from 1950 to 1960. He was elected to the Parliament on 15 November 1960. He represented the North Greenland at the Parliament. His parliamentary term ended on 22 September 1964. He was appointed minister for Greenland in the cabinet led by Prime President Viggo Kampmann on 18 November 1960. Gam continued to serve as minister of Greenland in the next cabinet formed by Jens Otto Krag. Gam's ministerial tenure ended on 26 September 1964.

Gam published several textbooks and other books on education in Greenland and on women in Greenland. He was married to Helga Gam. He died in Virum, Copenhagen, on 24 May 1982 and was buried in Søllerød cemetery.

Gam was first invested as commander and then, knight of the Order of the Dannebrog.
