= Minister of Defence (Denmark) =

Political position in Danish government

- Forsvarsminister

- Standard of the Minister of Defence

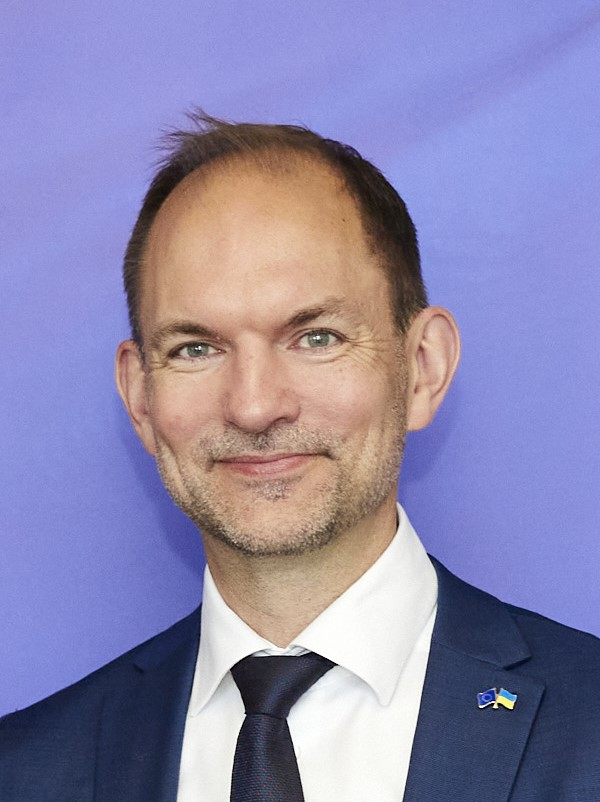
- Incumbent; Jeppe Bruus since 3 June 2026
- Ministry of Defence
- Type: Minister
- Member of: Cabinet; State Council; Government Security Committee
- Reports to: the Prime minister
- Seat: Slotsholmen
- Appointer: The Monarch (on the advice of the Prime Minister)
- Constituting instrument: Forsvarsloven
- Precursor: Minister for the Navy; Minister of War
- Formation: 5 September 1905; 121 years ago
- First holder: J.C. Christensen
- Succession: depending on the order in the State Council
- Deputy: Permanent Secretary of State for Defence
- Salary: 1.624.503,02 DKK (€217,931), in 2026
- Website: Official Website

The Minister of Defence of Denmark (Danish: Forsvarsminister, pronounced [ˈfɒːsvɑsmiˌnistɐ]) is the politically appointed head of the Danish Ministry of Defence. The Minister of Defence is responsible for the Danish Armed Forces, the Danish Defence Intelligence Service and the Danish Emergency Management Agency.

The Minister of Defence follows the directions given by the Prime Minister of Denmark and the decisions of the Folketing. The Danish Defence Law (Danish: Forsvarsloven) designates in article 9 the Minister of Defence as the supreme authority in Defence (Danish: højeste ansvarlige myndighed for forsvaret). Under the Minister is the Chief of Defence, the senior-ranking professional military officer heading the Defence Command, who commands the Army, the Navy, the Air Force and other units not reporting directly to the Ministry of Defence.

The main responsibilities of the Minister of Defence are to prevent armed conflicts and war, to safeguard the sovereignty of Denmark and integrity of Danish territory and to promote global peace and stability. Since 2002, these responsibilities have included the political leadership of the Danish contribution to the NATO led International Security Assistance Force (ISAF) in Afghanistan.

The current Defence Minister is Jeppe Bruus.

== History ==
In 1905, the offices of the Minister for the Navy and the Minister of War were merged to create the current office of Defence Minister.

== List of officeholders ==
=== Christian IX (1863–1906) ===
| No. | Portrait | Name (born–died) | Term of office | | | Political party | Cabinet | Ref. |
| No. | Portrait | Name (born–died) | Took office | Left office | Time in office | Political party | Cabinet | Ref. |
|---|---|---|---|---|---|---|---|---|
| 1 | | Jens Christian Christensen (1856–1930) | 5 September 1905 | 12 October 1908 | 3 years, 37 days | Venstre Reform Party | Christensen I–II | |

=== Frederick VIII (1906–1912) ===
| No. | Portrait | Name (born–died) | Term of office | | | Political party | Cabinet | Ref. |
| No. | Portrait | Name (born–died) | Took office | Left office | Time in office | Political party | Cabinet | Ref. |
|---|---|---|---|---|---|---|---|---|
| 2 | | Niels Neergaard (1854–1936) | 12 October 1908 | 16 September 1909 | 339 days | Moderate Venstre | Neergaard I | |
| (1) | | Jens Christian Christensen (1856–1930) | 16 September 1909 | 18 October 1909 | 32 days | Venstre Reform Party | Holstein-Ledreborg | |
| 3 | | Ludvig Holstein-Ledreborg (1839–1912) | 18 October 1909 | 28 October 1909 | 10 days | Independent | Holstein-Ledreborg | |
| 4 | | Christopher Krabbe (1833–1913) | 28 October 1909 | 5 July 1910 | 250 days | Social Liberal | Zahle I | |
| 5 | | Klaus Berntsen (1844–1927) | 5 July 1910 | 21 June 1913 | 2 years, 351 days | Venstre | Berntsen | |

=== Christian X (1912–1947) ===
| No. | Portrait | Name (birth–death) | Term of office | | | Political party | Cabinet | Ref. |
| No. | Portrait | Name (birth–death) | Took office | Left office | Time in office | Political party | Cabinet | Ref. |
|---|---|---|---|---|---|---|---|---|
| 6 | | Peter Rochegune Munch (1870–1948) | 21 June 1913 | 30 March 1920 | 6 years, 283 days | Social Liberal | Zahle II | |
| 7 | | Henri Konow (1862–1939) | 30 March 1920 | 5 April 1920 | 6 days | Independent | Liebe | |
| 8 | | Michael Pedersen Friis (1857–1944) | 5 April 1920 | 5 May 1920 | 30 days | Independent | Friis | |
| 9 | | Klaus Berntsen (1844–1927) | 5 May 1920 | 9 October 1922 | 2 years, 157 days | Venstre | Neergaard II | |
| 10 | | Søren Brorsen (1875–1961) | 9 October 1922 | 23 April 1924 | 1 year, 197 days | Venstre | Neergaard III | |
| 11 | | Laust Rasmussen (1862–1941) | 23 April 1924 | 14 December 1926 | 2 years, 235 days | Social Democrats | Stauning I | |
| (10) | | Søren Brorsen (1875–1961) | 14 December 1926 | 30 April 1929 | 2 years, 137 days | Venstre | Madsen-Mygdal | |
| (11) | | Laust Rasmussen (1862–1941) | 30 April 1929 | 24 November 1932 | 3 years, 208 days | Social Democrats | Stauning II | |
| 12 | | Hans Peter Hansen (1872–1953) | 24 November 1932 | 31 May 1933 | 188 days | Social Democrats | Stauning II | |
| 13 | | Thorvald Stauning (1873–1942) | 31 May 1933 | 4 November 1935 | 2 years, 157 days | Social Democrats | Stauning II | |
| 14 | | Alsing Andersen (1893–1962) | 4 November 1935 | 8 July 1940 | 4 years, 247 days | Social Democrats | Stauning III–IV–V | |
| (10) | | Søren Brorsen (1875–1961) | 8 July 1940 | 29 August 1943 | 3 years, 52 days | Venstre | Stauning VI | |
| (10) | | Søren Brorsen (1875–1961) | 8 July 1940 | 29 August 1943 | 3 years, 52 days | Venstre | Buhl I | |
| (10) | | Søren Brorsen (1875–1961) | 8 July 1940 | 29 August 1943 | 3 years, 52 days | Venstre | Scavenius | |
No Danish government in between August 29, 1943 and May 5, 1945. Office is assumed by the permanent secretary. (Note: On 29 August 1943, the Danish government resigned, refusing to grant further concessions to Nazi Germany. All government operations were assumed by the permanent secretaries of the individual departments, and this arrangement lasted until the Liberation of Denmark on 5 May 1945. Since King Christian X never accepted the resignation of the government, it existed de jure until a new cabinet was formed on 5 May 1945.)
| 15 | | Ole Bjørn Kraft (1893–1980) | 5 May 1945 | 7 November 1945 | 186 days | Conservative People's Party | Buhl II | |
| 16 | | Harald Petersen (1893–1970) | 7 November 1945 | 13 November 1947 | 2 years, 6 days | Venstre | Kristensen | |

=== Frederick IX (1947–1972) ===
| No. | Portrait | Name (birth–death) | Term of office | | | Political party | Cabinet | Ref. |
| No. | Portrait | Name (birth–death) | Took office | Left office | Time in office | Political party | Cabinet | Ref. |
|---|---|---|---|---|---|---|---|---|
| 17 | | Hans Rasmus Hansen (1896–1971) | 13 November 1947 | 30 October 1950 | 3 years, 17 days | Social Democrats | Hedtoft I–II | |
| (16) | | Harald Petersen (1893–1970) | 30 October 1950 | 30 September 1953 | 2 years, 335 days | Venstre | Eriksen | |
| (17) | | Hans Rasmus Hansen (1896–1971) | 30 September 1953 | 25 May 1956 | 2 years, 238 days | Social Democrats | Hedtoft III; Hansen I | |
| 18 | | Poul Hansen (1913–1966) | 8 October 1958 | 15 November 1962 | 4 years, 38 days | Social Democrats | Hansen I–II | |
| 18 | | Poul Hansen (1913–1966) | 8 October 1958 | 15 November 1962 | 4 years, 38 days | Social Democrats | Kampmann I–II | |
| 18 | | Poul Hansen (1913–1966) | 8 October 1958 | 15 November 1962 | 4 years, 38 days | Social Democrats | Krag I | |
| 19 | | Victor Gram (1910–1969) | 15 November 1962 | 2 February 1968 | 5 years, 79 days | Social Democrats | Krag I–II | |
| 20 | | Erik Ninn-Hansen (1922–2014) | 2 February 1968 | 17 March 1971 | 3 years, 43 days | Conservative People's Party | Baunsgaard | |
| 21 | | Knud Østergaard (1922–1993) | 17 March 1971 | 11 October 1971 | 208 days | Conservative People's Party | Baunsgaard | |
| 37 | | Kjeld Olesen (1932–2024) | 11 October 1971 | 27 September 1973 | 1 year, 351 days | Social Democrats | Krag III | |
| 37 | | Kjeld Olesen (1932–2024) | 11 October 1971 | 27 September 1973 | 1 year, 351 days | Social Democrats | Jørgensen I | |

=== Margrethe II (1972–2024) ===
| No. | Portrait | Name (birth–death) | Term of office | | | Political party | Cabinet | Ref. |
| No. | Portrait | Name (birth–death) | Took office | Left office | Time in office | Political party | Cabinet | Ref. |
|---|---|---|---|---|---|---|---|---|
| 23 | | Orla Møller (1916–1979) | 27 September 1973 | 19 December 1973 | 83 days | Social Democrats | Jørgensen I | |
| 24 | | Erling Brøndum (1930–2017) | 19 December 1973 | 13 February 1975 | 1 year, 56 days | Venstre | Hartling | |
| (23) | | Orla Møller (1916–1979) | 13 February 1975 | 1 October 1977 | 2 years, 230 days | Social Democrats | Jørgensen II | |
| 25 | | Poul Søgaard (1923–2016) | 1 October 1977 | 10 September 1982 | 4 years, 344 days | Social Democrats | Jørgensen II–III–IV–V | |
| 26 | | Hans Engell (born 1948) | 10 September 1982 | 10 September 1987 | 5 years, 0 days | Conservative People's Party | Schlüter I | |
| 27 | | Bernt Johan Collet (born 1941) | 10 September 1987 | 3 June 1988 | 267 days | Conservative People's Party | Schlüter II | |
| 28 | | Knud Enggaard (1929–2024) | 3 June 1988 | 25 January 1993 | 4 years, 236 days | Venstre | Schlüter III–IV | |
| 29 | | Hans Hækkerup (1945–2013) | 25 January 1993 | 21 December 2000 | 7 years, 331 days | Social Democrats | P. N. Rasmussen I–II–III–IV | |
| 30 | | Jan Trøjborg (1955–2012) | 21 December 2000 | 27 November 2001 | 341 days | Social Democrats | P. N. Rasmussen IV | |
| 31 | | Svend Aage Jensby (born 1940) | 27 November 2001 | 24 April 2004 | 2 years, 149 days | Venstre | A. F. Rasmussen I | |
| 32 | | Søren Gade (born 1963) | 24 April 2004 | 23 February 2010 | 5 years, 305 days | Venstre | A. F. Rasmussen I–II–III | |
| 32 | | Søren Gade (born 1963) | 24 April 2004 | 23 February 2010 | 5 years, 305 days | Venstre | L. L. Rasmussen I | |
| 33 | | Gitte Lillelund Bech (born 1969) | 23 February 2010 | 3 October 2011 | 1 year, 222 days | Venstre | L. L. Rasmussen I | |
| 34 | | Nick Hækkerup (born 1968) | 3 October 2011 | 9 August 2013 | 1 year, 310 days | Social Democrats | Thorning-Schmidt I | |
| 35 | | Nicolai Wammen (born 1971) | 9 August 2013 | 28 June 2015 | 1 year, 323 days | Social Democrats | Thorning-Schmidt I–II | |
| 36 | | Carl Holst (born 1970) | 28 June 2015 | 30 September 2015 | 94 days | Venstre | L. L. Rasmussen II | |
| 37 | | Peter Christensen (1975–2025) | 30 September 2015 | 28 November 2016 | 1 year, 59 days | Venstre | L. L. Rasmussen II | |
| 38 | | Claus Hjort Frederiksen (born 1947) | 28 November 2016 | 27 June 2019 | 2 years, 211 days | Venstre | L.L. Rasmussen III | |
| 39 | | Trine Bramsen (born 1981) | 27 June 2019 | 4 February 2022 | 2 years, 222 days | Social Democrats | Frederiksen I | |
| 40 | | Morten Bødskov (born 1970) | 4 February 2022 | 15 December 2022 | 314 days | Social Democrats | Frederiksen I | |
| 41 | | Jakob Ellemann-Jensen (born 1973) | 15 December 2022 | 6 February 2023 | 53 days | Venstre | Frederiksen II | |
| – | | Troels Lund Poulsen (born 1976) acting | 6 February 2023 | 1 August 2023 | 176 days | Venstre | Frederiksen II | |
| (41) | | Jakob Ellemann-Jensen (born 1973) | 1 August 2023 | 22 August 2023 | 21 days | Venstre | Frederiksen II | |
| 42 | | Troels Lund Poulsen (born 1976) | 22 August 2023 | 3 June 2026 | 2 years, 285 days | Venstre | Frederiksen II | |

=== Frederik X (2024–present) ===
| No. | Portrait | Name (birth–death) | Term of office | | | Political party | Cabinet | Ref. |
| No. | Portrait | Name (birth–death) | Took office | Left office | Time in office | Political party | Cabinet | Ref. |
|---|---|---|---|---|---|---|---|---|
| 43 | | Jeppe Bruus (born 1983) | 3 June 2026 | Incumbent | 96 days | Social Democrats | Frederiksen III | |

== See also ==
- Commander-in-chief#Denmark
