= Krag I cabinet =

Government of Denmark from 1962 to 1964

Krag's first cabinet
- 51st Cabinet of Denmark

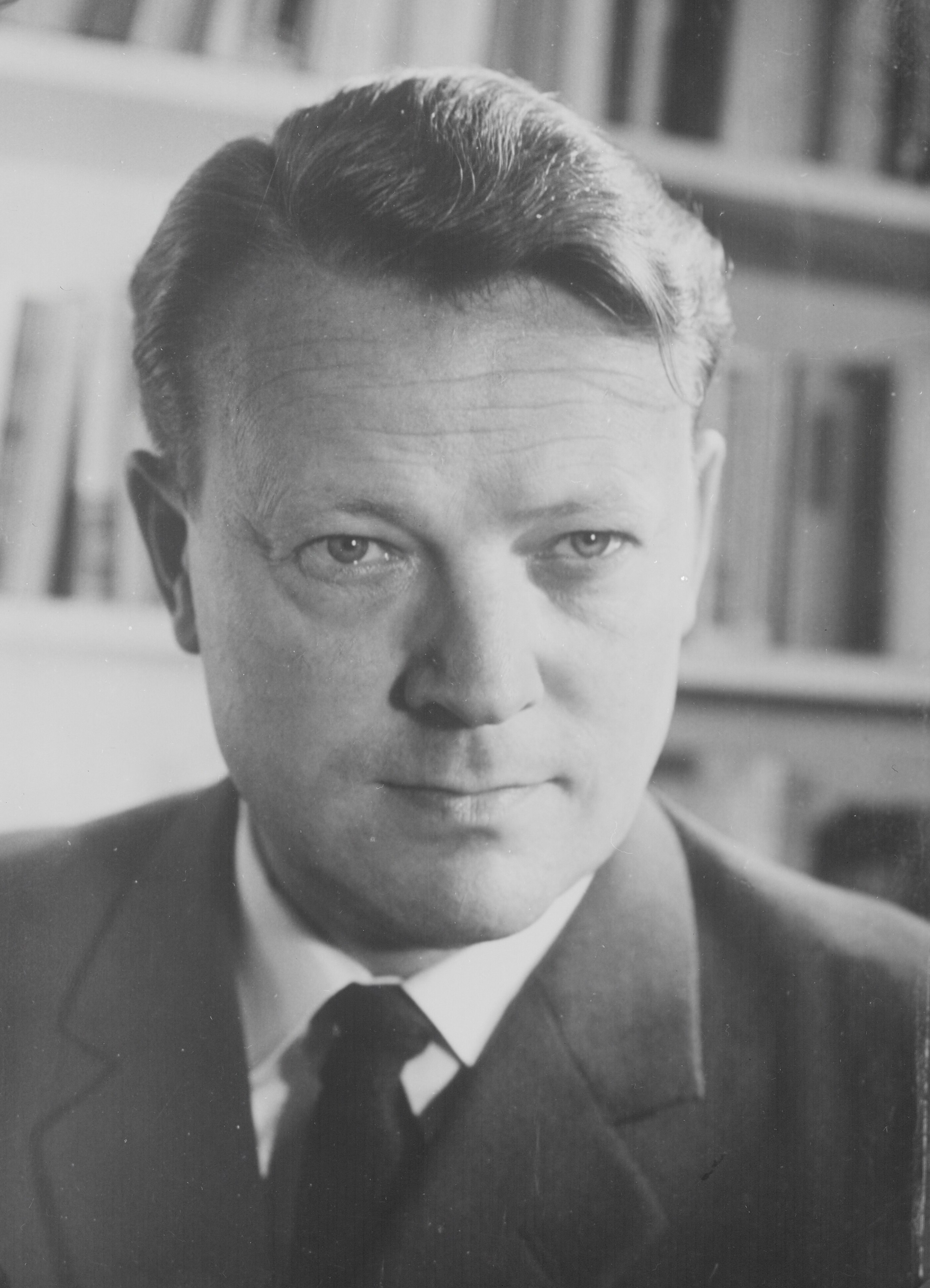
- Prime minister Jens Otto Krag
- Date formed: 3 September 1962
- Date dissolved: 26 September 1964

People and organisations
- Head of state: Frederik IX of Denmark
- Head of government: Jens Otto Krag
- No. of ministers: 18
- Member party: Social Democrats; Social Liberal Party
- Status in legislature: Minority government
- Opposition party: Venstre; Conservative People's Party; Socialist People's Party; Independent Party; Schleswig Party

History
- Legislature term: 1960–1964
- Incoming formation: Resignation of previous prime minister
- Outgoing formation: 1964 election
- Predecessor: Kampmann II
- Successor: Krag II

The first cabinet of Jens Otto Krag was the government of Denmark from 3 September 1962 to 26 September 1964, headed by Jens Otto Krag as prime minister, and succeeded Viggo Kampmann's second cabinet when Kampmann stepped down due to poor health. The cabinet consisted of the Social Democrats and Social Liberal Party.

== Composition ==
Cabinet members
Portfolio	Minister	Took office	Left office	Party
Prime Minister	Jens Otto Krag	3 September 1962	26 September 1964	Social Democrats
Minister of Foreign Affairs	Per Hækkerup	3 September 1962	26 September 1964	Social Democrats
Minister of Finance	Hans R. Knudsen	3 September 1962	4 November 1962 †	Social Democrats
Minister of Finance	Poul Hansen	15 November 1962	26 September 1964	Social Democrats
Minister of Defence	Poul Hansen	3 September 1962	15 November 1962	Social Democrats
Minister of Defence	Victor Gram	15 November 1962	26 September 1964	Social Democrats
Minister for Justice	Hans Erling Hækkerup	3 September 1962	26 September 1964	Social Democrats
Minister of the Interior	Lars P. Jensen	3 September 1962	26 September 1964	Social Democrats
Minister of Public Works	Kai Lindberg	3 September 1962	26 September 1964	Social Democrats
Minister for Education	Kristen Helveg Petersen	3 September 1962	26 September 1964	Social Liberals
Minister for Ecclesiastical Affairs	Bodil Koch	3 September 1962	26 September 1964	Social Democrats
Minister for Cultural Affairs	Julius Bomholt	3 September 1962	26 September 1964	Social Democrats
Minister for Labour	Kaj Bundvad	3 September 1962	27 August 1963	Social Democrats
Minister for Labour	Erling Dinesen	27 August 1963	26 September 1964	Social Democrats
Minister for Economic Affairs	Kjeld Philip	3 September 1962	26 September 1964	Social Liberals
Minister of Agriculture	Karl Skytte	3 September 1962	26 September 1964	Social Liberals
Minister for Social Affairs	Kaj Bundvad	3 September 1962	26 September 1964	Social Democrats
Minister for Housing	Carl P. Jensen	3 September 1962	26 September 1964	Social Democrats
Minister of Industry, Trade, and Seafaring	Hilmar Baunsgaard	3 September 1962	26 September 1964	Social Liberals
Minister of Fisheries	Arnold Christian Normann	3 September 1962	26 September 1964	Social Liberals
Minister for Greenland	Mikael Gam	3 September 1962	26 September 1964	Independent
