= Hans Rasmus Hansen =

Danish politician (1896–1971)

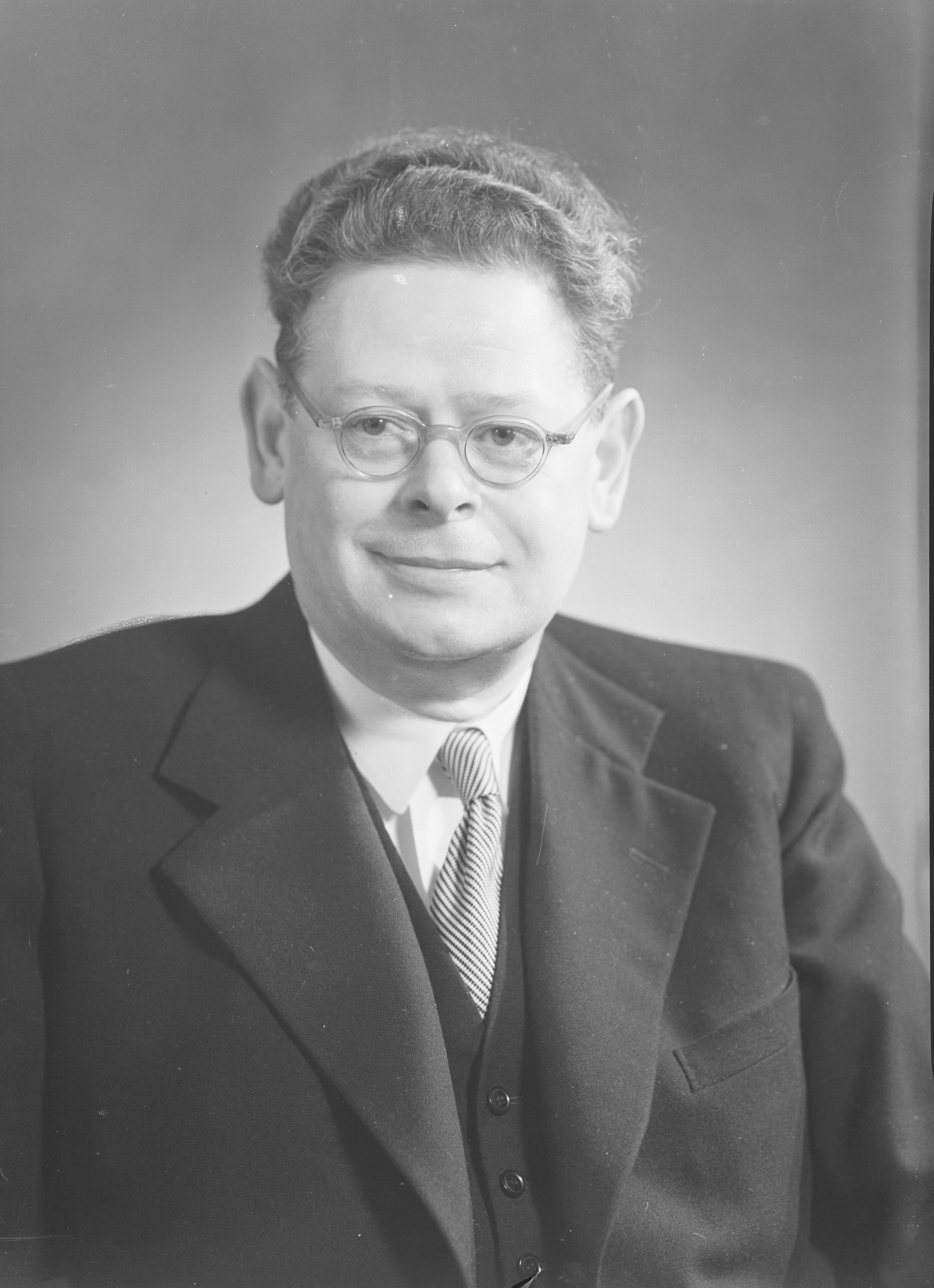

Minister of Defence
- In office 13 November 1947 – 30 October 1950
- Prime Minister: Hans Hedtoft
- Preceded by: Harald Petersen
- Succeeded by: Harald Petersen
- In office 30 September 1953 – 25 May 1956
- Prime Minister: Hans Hedtoft; H. C. Hansen
- Preceded by: Harald Petersen
- Succeeded by: Poul Hansen

Personal details
- Born: 16 August 1896 Kolding, Denmark
- Died: 10 October 1971 (aged 75) Copenhagen, Denmark
- Party: Social Democrats
- Education: London School of Economics

Hans Rasmus Hansen (16 August 1896 – 10 October 1971) was a Danish politician and a cabinet minister. He was the minister of defense for two terms: between 1947 and 1950 and between 1953 and 1956.He was also a long-term member of the Parliament for Social Democrats from 1936 to 1964.

== Early life and education ==
Rasmus Hansen born in Kolding on 16 August 1896. In 1917 he joined the Social Democrats' youth organization. He graduated from London School of Economics in 1927. He also attended social democrat party school in Germany.

== Career ==
Following his return to Denmark Rasmus Hansen edited Vordingborg Socialdemokraten from 1927 1929. In the period between 1929 and 1936 he worked as the editorial secretary at the Social-Demokraten newspaper. In 1936 he was elected to the Parliament for the Social Democrats where he served until 1964.

Rasmus Hansen was appointed minister of defense 13 November 1947 and remained in office until 30 October 1950, under Hans Hedtoft. His second term as minister of defense was between 30 September 1953 and 25 May 1956, and he served in the cabinets led by Hans Hedtoft and then by H. C. Hansen during this second period.

== Later years and death ==
Rasmus Hansen suffered a stroke in 1956 while he was attending a NATO ministerial meeting in Paris. After recovering, he resumed parliamentary work, but his condition became very unstable so that he resigned from politics in 1964. He died in Copenhagen on 10 October 1971.
