= Hartling Cabinet =

Danish cabinet between 1973 and 1975

- 57th Cabinet of Denmark

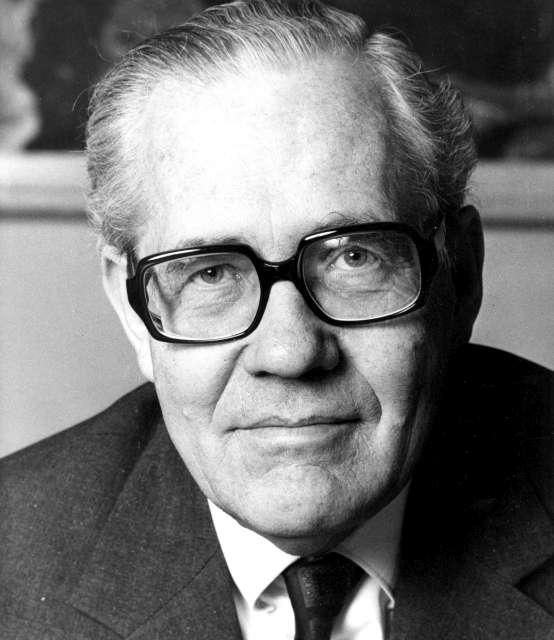
- Prime Minister Hartling
- Date formed: 19 December 1973
- Date dissolved: 13 February 1975

People and organisations
- Head of state: Margrethe II
- Head of government: Poul Hartling
- No. of ministers: 12
- Total no. of members: 16
- Member party: Venstre
- Status in legislature: Single-party minority

History
- Election: 1973
- Legislature term: 1973–1975
- Incoming formation: 1973 election
- Outgoing formation: 1975 election
- Predecessor: Jørgensen I
- Successor: Jørgensen II

The Cabinet of Hartling was the government of Denmark from 19 December 1973 to 13 February 1975. The minority cabinet was composed of 12 members of Venstre, led by Poul Hartling. The cabinet members resigned on 13 February 1975, as a result of the party's losing that year's election.

== List of ministers ==
The cabinet members were as follows:

Cabinet members
| Portfolio | Minister | Took office | Left office | Party |
|---|---|---|---|---|
| Prime Minister | Poul Hartling | 19 December 1973 | 13 February 1975 | Venstre |
| Minister of Foreign Affairs | Ove Guldberg | 19 December 1973 | 13 February 1975 | Venstre |
| Minister for Finance | Anders Andersen | 19 December 1973 | 13 February 1975 | Venstre |
| Minister of the Interior | Jacob Sørensen | 19 December 1973 | 13 February 1975 | Venstre |
| Minister of Justice; Minister of Cultural Affairs | Nathalie Lind | 19 December 1973 | 13 February 1975 | Venstre |
| Minister for Ecclesiastical Affairs | Kresten Damsgaard | 19 December 1973 | 13 February 1975 | Venstre |
| Minister of Defence | Erling Brøndum | 19 December 1973 | 13 February 1975 | Venstre |
| Minister of Social Affairs | Jacob Sørensen | 19 December 1973 | 13 February 1975 | Venstre |
| Minister for Education | Tove Nielsen | 19 December 1973 | 13 February 1975 | Venstre |
| Minister of Economic Affairs and Trade | Poul Nyboe Andersen | 19 December 1973 | 13 February 1975 | Venstre |
| Minister of Public Works | Kresten Damsgaard | 19 December 1973 | 13 February 1975 | Venstre |
| Minister for the Environment; Minister for Greenland | Holger Hansen | 19 December 1973 | 13 February 1975 | Venstre |
| Minister for Agriculture and Fisheries | Niels Anker Kofoed | 19 December 1973 | 13 February 1975 | Venstre |
| Minister for Labor and Housing | Johan Philipsen | 19 December 1973 | 13 February 1975 | Venstre |

| Preceded by Jørgensen I | Cabinet of Denmark; 1973–1975 | Succeeded by Jørgensen II |
