= Gitte Lillelund Bech =

Danish politician

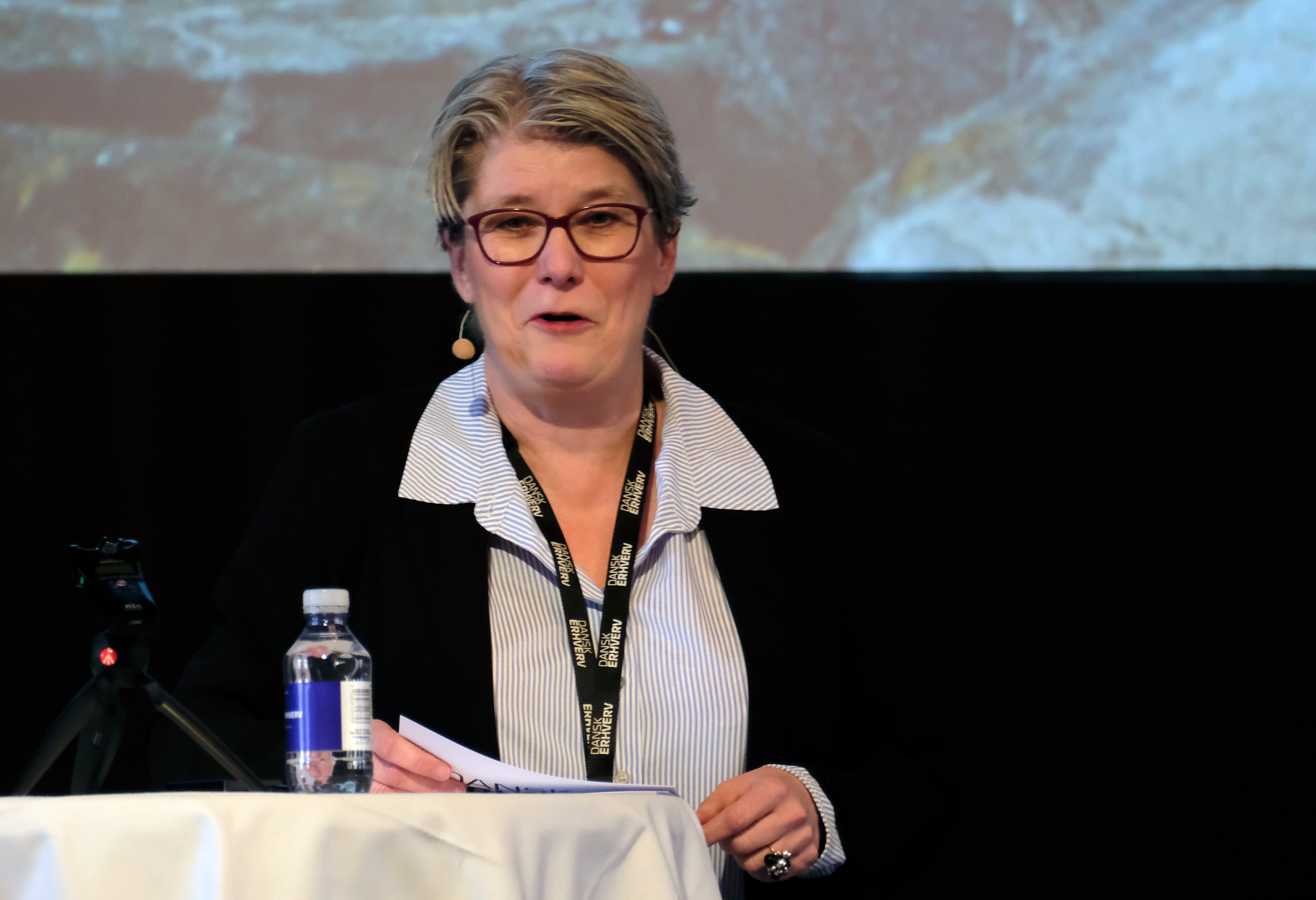

Minister of Defence
- In office 23 February 2010 – 3 October 2011
- Prime Minister: Lars Løkke Rasmussen
- Preceded by: Søren Gade
- Succeeded by: Nick Hækkerup

Personal details
- Born: 21 January 1969 (age 57) Århus, Denmark
- Party: Venstre

Gitte Lillelund Bech (born 21 January 1969) is a Danish politician who has been Defence Minister representing the Liberal party, Venstre. She entered office in February 2010, when she replaced Søren Gade after a cabinet reshuffle.

Political offices
Preceded by Søren Gade	Defence Minister of Denmark; 2010–2011	Succeeded by Nick Hækkerup
