= Minister of Communications (Denmark) =

Former Danish political office

- Kommunikationsminister
- State coat of arms of the Kingdom of Denmark
- Longest serving Torben Rechendorff; 10 January 1989 – 25 January 1993
- Type: Minister
- Member of: Cabinet; State Council
- Reports to: the Prime minister
- Seat: Slotsholmen
- Appointer: The Monarch (on the advice of the Prime Minister)
- Precursor: Minister of Culture
- Formation: 10 September 1987
- First holder: Hans Peter Clausen
- Final holder: Helge Mortensen
- Abolished: 27 September 1994
- Superseded by: Minister of Science
- Succession: depending on the order in the State Council
- Deputy: Permanent Secretary

The Danish Minister of Communications (Danish: Kommunikationsminister), was a minister in the government of Denmark, with overall responsibility for strategy and policy across communications, often combined with other areas.

Following the creation of the second cabinet of Poul Schlüter areas of radio, television and parts of the postal and telegraph services were transferred to new Minister of Communications. In 1994, the position was abolished and the minister's responsibilities were placed under the Minister of Science.

== List of officeholders ==
No.	Portrait	Name (born–died)	Term of office			Political party	Government	Ref.
No.	Portrait	Name (born–died)	Took office	Left office	Time in office	Political party	Government	Ref.
Minister of Culture and Communications (Kultur- og kommunikationsminister)
1		Hans Peter Clausen (1933–2014)	10 September 1987	3 June 1988	267 days	Conservative People's Party	Schlüter II	
Minister of Traffic and Communications (Trafik- og kommunikationsminister)
(1)		Hans Peter Clausen (1928–1998)	3 June 1988	10 January 1989	221 days	Conservative People's Party	Schlüter III	
Minister of Communications (Kommunikationsminister)
2		Torben Rechendorff (1937–2022)	10 January 1989	25 January 1993	4 years, 236 days	Conservative People's Party	Schlüter III–IV	
Minister of Communications and Tourism (Minister for kommunikation og turisme)
3		Arne Melchior (1924–2016)	25 January 1993	28 January 1994	1 year, 3 days	Social Democrats	P. N. Rasmussen I	
4		Helge Mortensen (1941–2026)	28 January 1994	27 September 1994	242 days	Social Democrats	P. N. Rasmussen I	
