= Harald Petersen =

Danish politician (1893–1970)

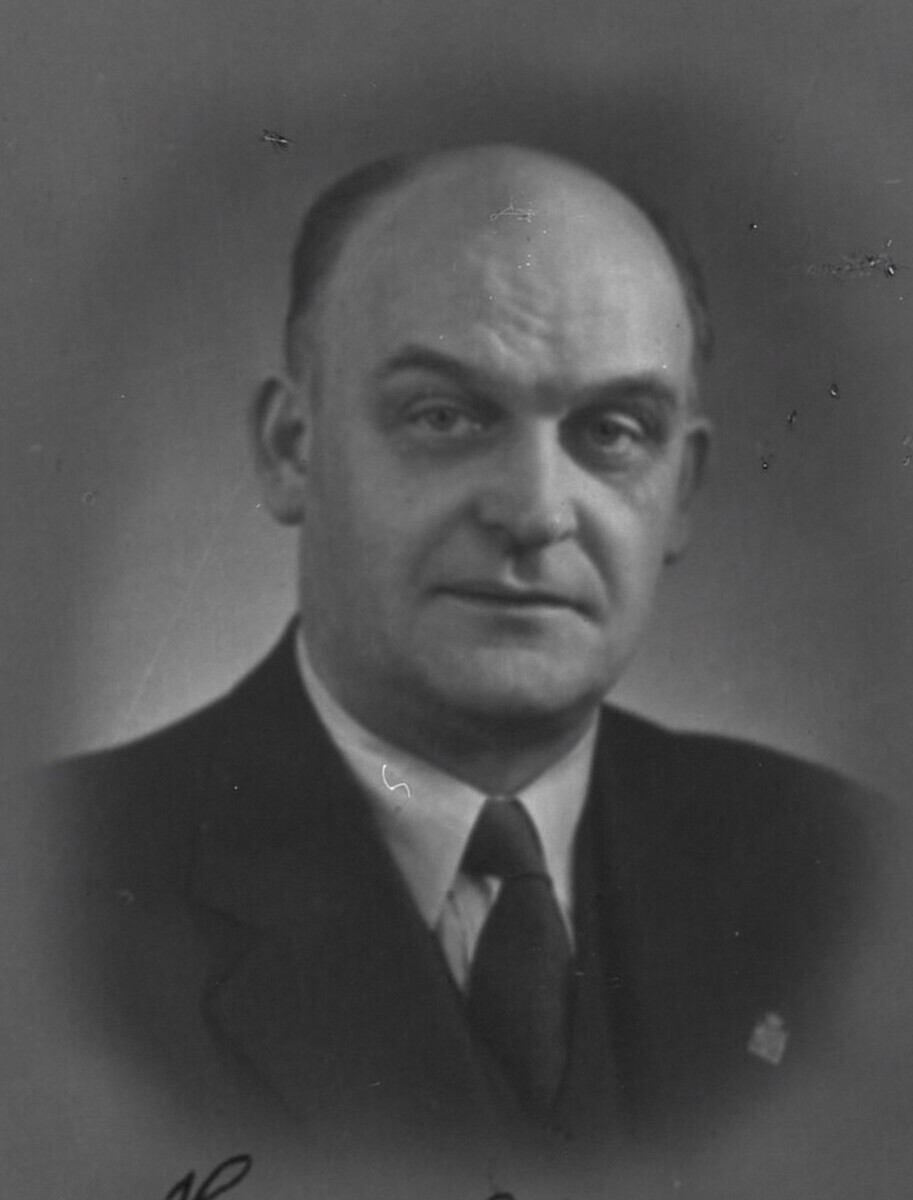

Minister of Justice
- In office July 1940 – July 1941
- Prime Minister: Thorvald Stauning
- Preceded by: Svend Unmack Larsen
- Succeeded by: Eigil Thune Jacobsen

Minister of Defence
- In office 7 November 1945 – 13 November 1947
- Prime Minister: Knud Kristensen
- Preceded by: Ole Bjørn Kraft
- Succeeded by: Hans Rasmus Hansen
- In office 30 October 1950 – 30 September 1953
- Prime Minister: Erik Eriksen
- Preceded by: Hans Rasmus Hansen
- Succeeded by: Hans Rasmus Hansen

Personal details
- Born: 27 October 1893 Store Damme, Møn, Denmark
- Died: 16 January 1970 (aged 76) Hellerup, Denmark
- Party: Venstre
- Spouses: Eleonora Vilhelmine Bugge (m. 1924; died 1948); Ulricha Raun Kristensen (m. 1948)
- Parents: Emil Petersen (father); Emilie Marie Carstensen (mother)

Harald Petersen (27 October 1893 – 16 January 1970) was a Danish politician who served as the minister of justice and twice minister of defence in the 1940s and 1950s.

== Early life and education ==
Petersen was born in Store Damme, Møn, on 27 October 1893. His parents were Emil Petersen who was a teacher and a member of the parliament, and Emilie Marie Carstensen. He received a teaching certificate in 1914 and then attended courses on economics and foreign languages in Copenhagen.

== Career ==
Petersen worked as a journalist at Ringsted Folketidende for two years between 1916 and 1918. In 1918 he began to work for the Venstre as a parliament correspondence and from 1919 at its press office. In 1925, Petersen became the secretary of the left-wing parliamentary group and secretary of the left's national organization in 1929 becoming the first to hold this post. Between July 1940 and July 1941 he was the minister of justice in the cabinet led by Prime Minister Thorvald Stauning, but he had to resign when during a football match between the Danish and Austrian teams on Denmark's Constitution Day, 5 June, the Danish people attacked German soldiers with rocks and bottles.

Petersen was elected to Parliament from the Højrupkredsen in 1943 and remained in the office until 1950. In 1945 he became the deputy chairman of the party's parliamentary group and was a close adviser to Knud Kristensen. Petersen was appointed minister of defence to the cabinet led by Kristensen. Petersen served in the post until 12 December 1947. He was named the director of the Mortgage Bank in 1948, but was reappointed minister of defence to the cabinet led by Erik Eriksen in 1950 and was in office until 1953. When the government resigned following the elections in September 1953 Petersen returned to the Mortgage Bank as director where he worked until 1964.

== Personal life and death ==
Petersen married twice. He married first Eleonora Vilhelmine Bugge on 24 September 1924. His wife died in 1948, and Petersen married Ulricha Raun Kristensen on 29 May 1948.

He died in Hellerup on 16 January 1970.
