= Nathalie Lind =

Danish politician (1918–1999)

Minister of Justice
- In office 30 August 1978 – 26 October 1979
- Prime Minister: Anker Jørgensen
- Preceded by: Erling Johannes Jensen
- Succeeded by: Henning Rasmussen
- In office 19 December 1973 – 13 February 1975
- Prime Minister: Poul Hartling
- Preceded by: Karl Hjortnæs
- Succeeded by: Orla Møller

Minister for Cultural Affairs
- In office 19 December 1973 – 13 February 1975
- Prime Minister: Poul Hartling
- Preceded by: Niels Matthiassen
- Succeeded by: Niels Matthiassen

Minister of Social Affairs
- In office 2 February 1968 – 11 October 1971
- Prime Minister: Hilmar Baunsgaard
- Preceded by: Kaj Bundvad
- Succeeded by: Eva Gredal

Personal details
- Born: Bertha Frederikke Nathalie Lind; 1 October 1918 Copenhagen, Denmark
- Died: 11 January 1999 (aged 80) Copenhagen, Denmark
- Party: Venstre
- Spouses: Niels Erik Langsted (m. 1968); Erik Knud Desiré Tfelt-Hansen (m. 1943; died 1962)
- Children: 2
- Education: University of Copenhagen
- Occupation: Jurist

Nathalie Lind (1 October 1918 – 11 January 1999) was a Danish jurist and politician from Venstre. She notably served as minister of justice from 1973 to 1975 and again from 1978 to 1979, while concurrently also being minister of culture for the former period. She also served as minister of social affairs from 1968 to 1971.

== Early life and education ==
Lind was born in Copenhagen on 1 October 1918. Her father involved fishing business and died when she was two years old. Then her mother took over his business in Hillerød. Lind studied law at the University of Copenhagen and received a degree in law in 1943.

== Career ==
Lind started her career in Aalborg where her husband and she worked as a police assistant. From 1948 she began to work as a lawyer and then, moved with her husband to Virum where she ran a law firm in the period 1955–1963. She joined the Venstre and was elected to the Folketing in 1964 representing the Fredensborg constituency, but was not reelected in 1966. In 1968 she won a seat at the Folketing representing the Vardek, and served at the parliament until 1981.

Lind's first ministerial post was the minister of social affairs in the cabinet of Hilmar Baunsgaard which she held between 1968 and 1971. She was both minister of justice and minister of culture in the cabinet led by Poul Hartling from 1973 to 1975. She also served as the minister of justice in the cabinet of Anker Jørgensen in the period 1978–1979.

Lind died on 11 January 1999.
