= Jørgen Peder Hansen =

Danish politician (1923–1994)

Jørgen Peder Hansen (2 December 1923 – 1994) was a Danish politician and minister. He represented the Socialdemokraterne.

In his spare time he was a painter and designer, and worked as a toll operator from 1964.

== Ministerial career ==
- Minister for Ecclesiastical Affairs and Greendland in Anker Jørgensen's second Cabinet from 13 February 1975 to 30 August 1978.
- Minister for Greenland in Anker Jørgensen's third Cabinet from 30 August 1978 to 26 October 1979.
- Minister for Ecclesiastical Affairs and Greenland in Anker Jørgensen's fourth government from 26 October 1979 to 20 January 1981.

After his political career, he was Danish general consul in Flensborg 1981–93.

Preceded by Kresten Damsgaard	Danish Minister for Ecclesiastical Affairs; 1975-1978	Succeeded by Egon Jensen

Preceded by Holger Hansen	Danish Minister for Greenland; 1975-1981	Succeeded by Tove Lindbo Larsen

Preceded by Egon Jensen	Danish Minister for Ecclesiastical Affairs; 1979-1981	Succeeded by Tove Lindbo Larsen
