= Holger Hansen =

Danish politician and academic (1929–2015)

Minister of the Environment
- In office 19 December 1973 – 13 February 1975
- Prime Minister: Poul Hartling
- Preceded by: Helge Nielsen
- Succeeded by: Helge Nielsen

Minister for Greenland
- In office 19 December 1973 – 13 February 1975
- Prime Minister: Poul Hartling
- Preceded by: Knud Hertling
- Succeeded by: Jørgen Peder Hansen

Personal details
- Born: 16 May 1929 Tågeby, Denmark
- Died: 3 May 2015 (aged 85) Tågeby, Denmark
- Resting place: Tågeby, Denmark
- Party: Venstre
- Spouse: Anna Sofie Hansen (m. 1961)
- Children: 3
- Education: University of Copenhagen
- Profession: Academic; Agronomist; Jurist

Holger Hansen (1929–2015) was a Danish academic, jurist and politician from Venstre who served as the minister of environment and minister of Greenland in the cabinet of Poul Hartling from 1973 to 1975. Trained as an agronomist, he received a law degree and worked as an academic after retiring from politics.

== Early life and education ==
Hansen was born in Tågeby near Mern on 16 May 1929. He graduated from a high school in Frederiksborg and went to England to study agriculture in 1952. He attended Lyngby agricultural school in the period 1952–1953.

In 1977 Hansen started his studies in law at the University of Copenhagen and graduated in 1980 earning a bachelor's degree. In 1985 he received a master's degree in law.

== Career ==
In 1954, Hansen started in politics when he became the head of Venstres Ungdom (VU), Venstre party's youth organization, in Præstø county. From 1957 to 1959 he was a member of its national executive committee. Between 1958 and 1973 he worked at several municipal councils. He was elected to the Danish Parliament in 1960 for the first time and served there until 1977 for Venstre. On 19 December 1973, Hansen was appointed both minister of environment and minister for Greenland to the cabinet led by Prime Minister Poul Hartling. During his term as minister of environment Hansen signed the Nordic Environmental Protection Convention on behalf of Denmark on 19 February 1974. Hansen's tenure ended on 13 February 1975 when the cabinet resigned following the 1975 election.

From 1986 Hansen worked at the University of Copenhagen's Faculty of Law which he headed between 1994 and 1996.

== Personal life and death ==
Hansen married Anna Sofie Hansen on 9 September 1961. They had three children. He died in Tågeby on 3 May 2015 and buried there on 8 May.
