= Birgit Fogh-Andersen =

Danish politician

Member of the Folketing
- In office 1984–1987
- Constituency: Western Copenhagen

Personal details
- Born: 28 September 1922 Copenhagen, Denmark
- Died: 11 August 2012 (aged 89)
- Resting place: Frederiksberg Ældre Kirkegård

Birgit Aase Fogh-Andersen (28 September 1922 – 11 August 2012) was a Danish politician from the Conservative People's Party.

== See also ==
- List of members of the Folketing, 1984–1987
