= Helge Mortensen =

Danish politician (1941–2026)

Minister for Communications
- In office 28 January 1994 – 27 September 1994

Minister of Transport
- In office 25 January 1993 – 28 January 1994

Member of the Folketing
- In office 10 January 1984 – 8 February 2005

Personal details
- Born: 9 May 1941 Fraugde, Denmark
- Died: 28 April 2026 (aged 84)
- Party: Social Democrats

Helge Mortensen (9 May 1941 – 28 April 2026) was a Danish politician from the Social Democrats.

== Life and career ==
Mortensen was born in Fraugde on 9 May 1941. He was a Member of the Danish Parliament for the Ribe County District from 10 January 1984 to 8 February 2005.

He was also the Minister for Communications from 28 January 1994 to 27 September 1994, and the Minister of Transport from 25 January 1993 to 28 January 1994.

Mortensen died on 28 April 2026, at the age of 84.

== See also ==
- List of members of the Folketing, 2001–2005
- List of members of the Folketing, 1998–2001
- List of members of the Folketing, 1994–1998
- List of members of the Folketing, 1990–1994
- List of members of the Folketing, 1988–1990
- List of members of the Folketing, 1987–1988
- List of members of the Folketing, 1984–1987
