= Tom Høyem =

Danish and German politician

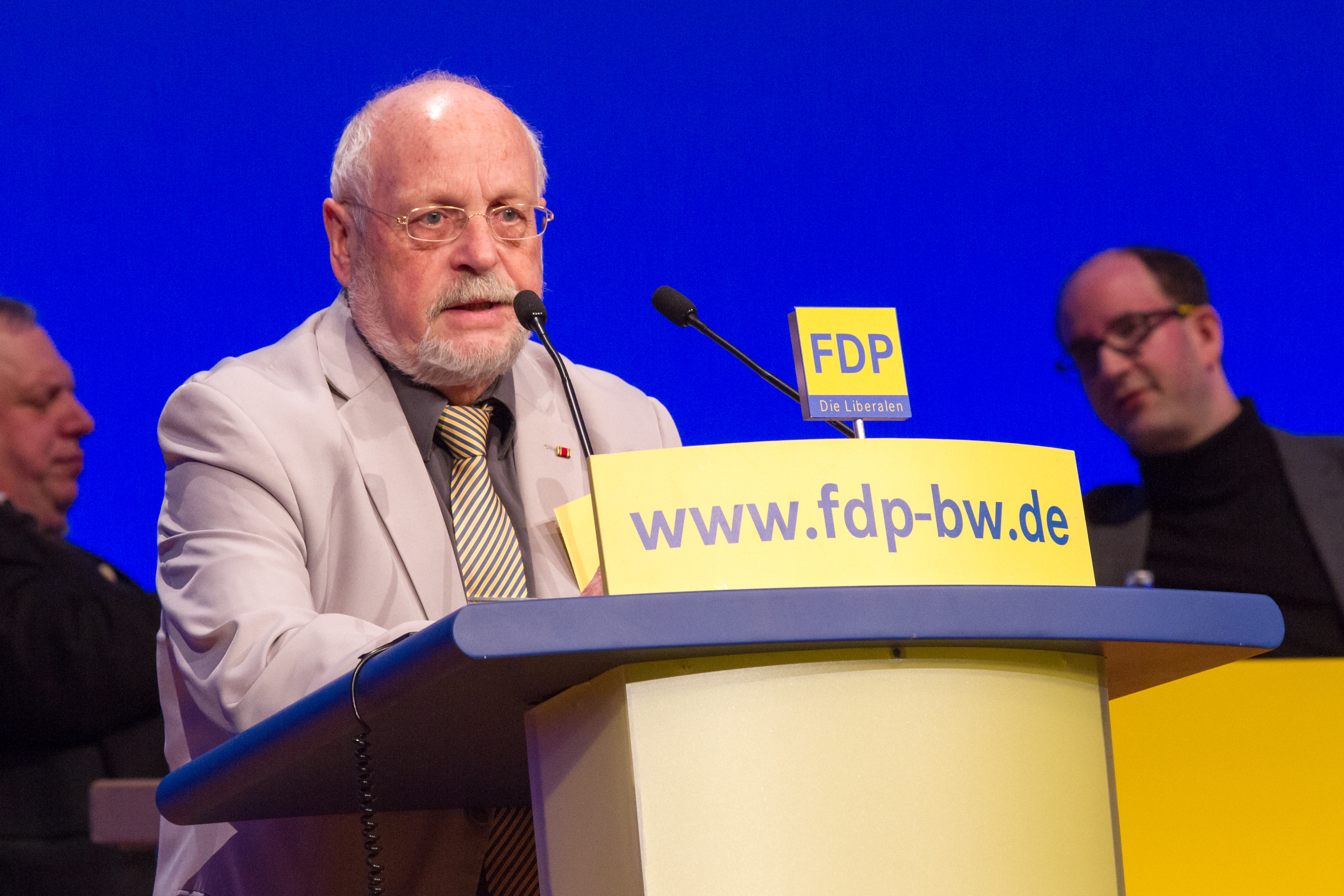

Councilor of the City of Karlsruhe
- Incumbent
- Assumed office 2005

Minister for Greenland
- In office 10 September 1982 – 1 September 1987
- Prime Minister: Poul Schlüter
- Preceded by: Tove Lindbo Larsen
- Succeeded by: Mimi Jakobsen

Personal details
- Born: 10 October 1941 (age 84)
- Party: Free Democratic (Germany); Centre Democrats (Denmark)
- Children: 4
- Website: Official website

Tom Høyem (born 10 October 1941) is a Danish and German politician, and former headmaster in the European Schools.

== Political career in Denmark ==
Between September 1982 and September 1987, Høyem served as Minister for Greenland within the Danish government under the premiership of Poul Schlüter. He was succeeded by Mimi Jakobsen.

On 14 September 1984, Høyem was awarded the honour of kommandør af Dannebrogordenen.

Høyem has served as independent election observer for Organization for Security and Co-operation in Europe on behalf of the Danish government in Albania, Bosnia and Herzegovina, Montenegro, Ukraine, the State of Palestine and the Democratic Republic of the Congo.

== Headmaster in the European Schools ==
Between 1987 and 2015, Høyem served successively as the Director (headmaster) of the European School, Culham (1987–1994), the European School, Munich (1994–2000), and the European School, Karlsruhe (2000–2015).

== Political career in Germany ==
In 1994, Høyem joined the Freie Demokratische Partei, the German liberal party, and in 2004 he was elected to serve on the Gemeinderat (council) of the city of Karlsruhe.
