= Erling Brøndum =

Danish journalist and politician (1930–2017)

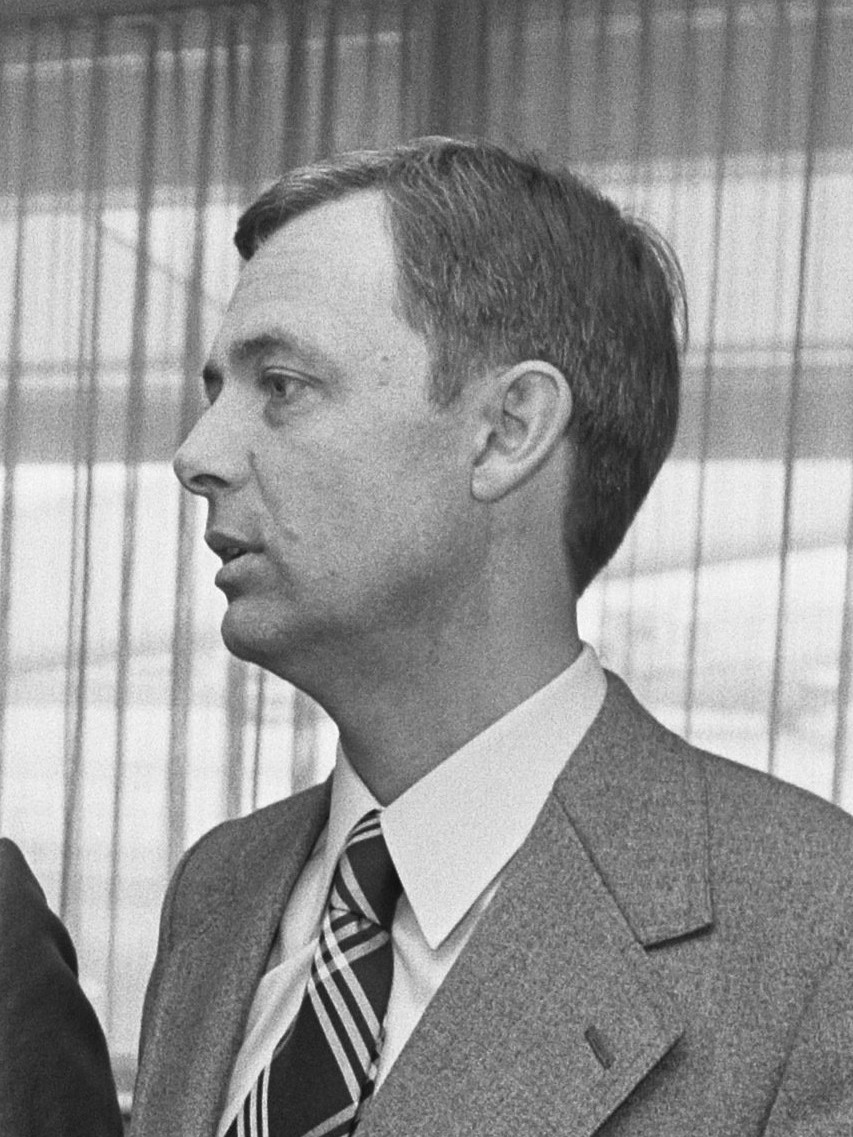

Minister of Defence
- In office 19 December 1973 – 29 January 1975
- Prime Minister: Poul Hartling
- Preceded by: Orla Møller
- Succeeded by: Orla Møller

Personal details
- Born: 11 July 1930 Aarhus, Denmark
- Died: 4 August 2017 (aged 87) Birkerød, Denmark
- Party: Venstre

Erling Brøndum (11 July 1930 – 4 August 2017) was a Danish journalist and politician. Brøndum, a member of the Venstre political party, served as the defence minister in the cabinet led by Prime Minister Poul Hartling from 1973 to 1975.

He began at Bornholms Tidende as a reporter, and at age 26, was named chief editor. After fourteen years as the publication's editor, Brøndum joined the staff of the Horsens Folkeblad. In 1973, Poul Hartling named Brøndum minister of defence. He left the post in 1975, and returned to Horsens Folkeblad and the Aalborg Stiftstidende.
