= Søren Gade =

Danish politician (born 1963)

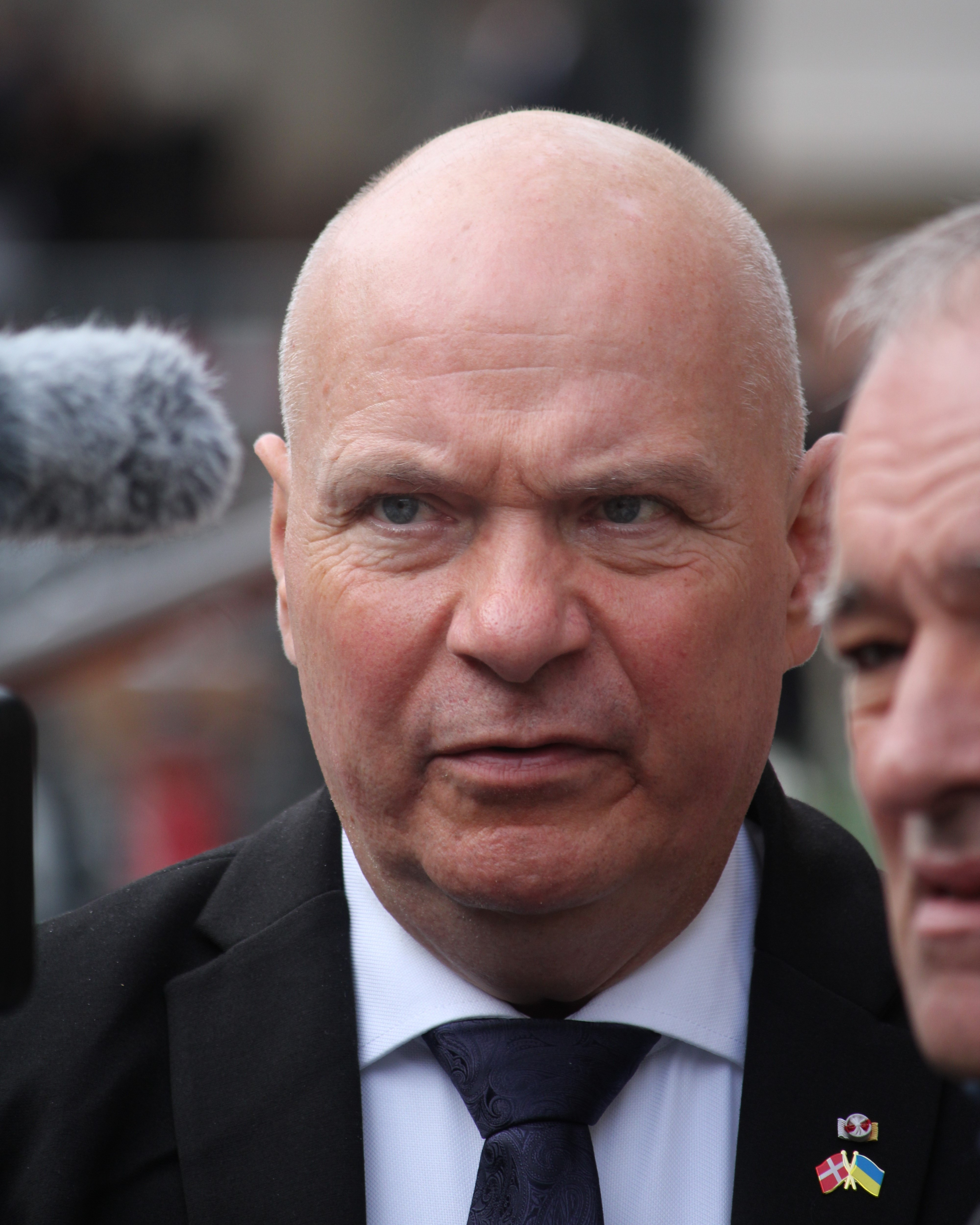
- Gade in 2025

Speaker of the Folketing
- In office 16 November 2022 – 6 October 2026
- Monarchs: Margrethe II; Frederik X
- Preceded by: Henrik Dam Kristensen
- Succeeded by: Henrik Frandsen

Minister of Defence
- In office 24 April 2004 – 23 February 2010
- Prime Minister: Anders Fogh Rasmussen; Lars Løkke Rasmussen
- Preceded by: Svend Aage Jensby
- Succeeded by: Gitte Lillelund Bech

Member of the Folketing
- Incumbent
- Assumed office 14 November 2022
- Constituency: West Jutland
- In office 18 June 2015 – 5 June 2019
- Constituency: North Jutland
- In office 20 November 2001 – 23 February 2010
- Constituency: Ringkøbing County (2001–2007); Western Jutland (2007–2010)

Member of the European Parliament for Denmark
- In office 2 July 2019 – 14 November 2022
- Succeeded by: Erik Poulsen

Personal details
- Born: Søren Gade Jensen; 27 January 1963 (age 63) Holstebro, Denmark
- Party: Venstre
- Spouse: Helle Buskbjerg Poulsen (died 2008)
- Children: 2
- Education: Aarhus University
- Occupation: Military officer, businessman

Military service
- Allegiance: Denmark
- Branch/service: Royal Danish Army
- Years of service: 1983–present
- Rank: Major in the Reserve
- Unit: Jutland Dragoon Regiment

Søren Gade Jensen (born 27 January 1963) is a Danish politician who was Speaker of the Folketing from November 2022 to October 2026, representing the Liberal party, Venstre. He was a Liberal member of the Folketing from 2001 to 2019 and again in 2022. Before entering politics, he was a military officer and businessman. He was formerly a Member of the European Parliament from 2019 to 2022.

He was also CEO of the Danish business organization Landbrug & Fødevarer from 2012 to 2014.

== Political career ==
=== Minister of Defence, 2004–2010 ===
Gade served as Defence Minister from 2004 to 2010, when he replaced Svend Aage Jensby. During his time in office, he led Danish efforts to maintain public support for the deployment of 750 troops in Afghanistan. Gade resigned from his position due to a long time conflict with the media after the publishing of a fake Arabic translation of Thomas Rathsack's book, telling the defence's methods in the Afghan war.

=== Member of the European Parliament, 2019–2022 ===
Gade was elected to the European Parliament in 2019. A member of the Renew Europe group, he served as chair of the Committee on Fisheries and as member of the Committee on Transport and Tourism. Within the Committee on Transport and Tourism, he was part of the Tourism Task Force (TTF). In 2020, he also joined the Special Committee on Beating Cancer.

In addition to his committee assignments, Gade was the chair of the Parliament's delegation for relations with India.

=== Return to national politics ===
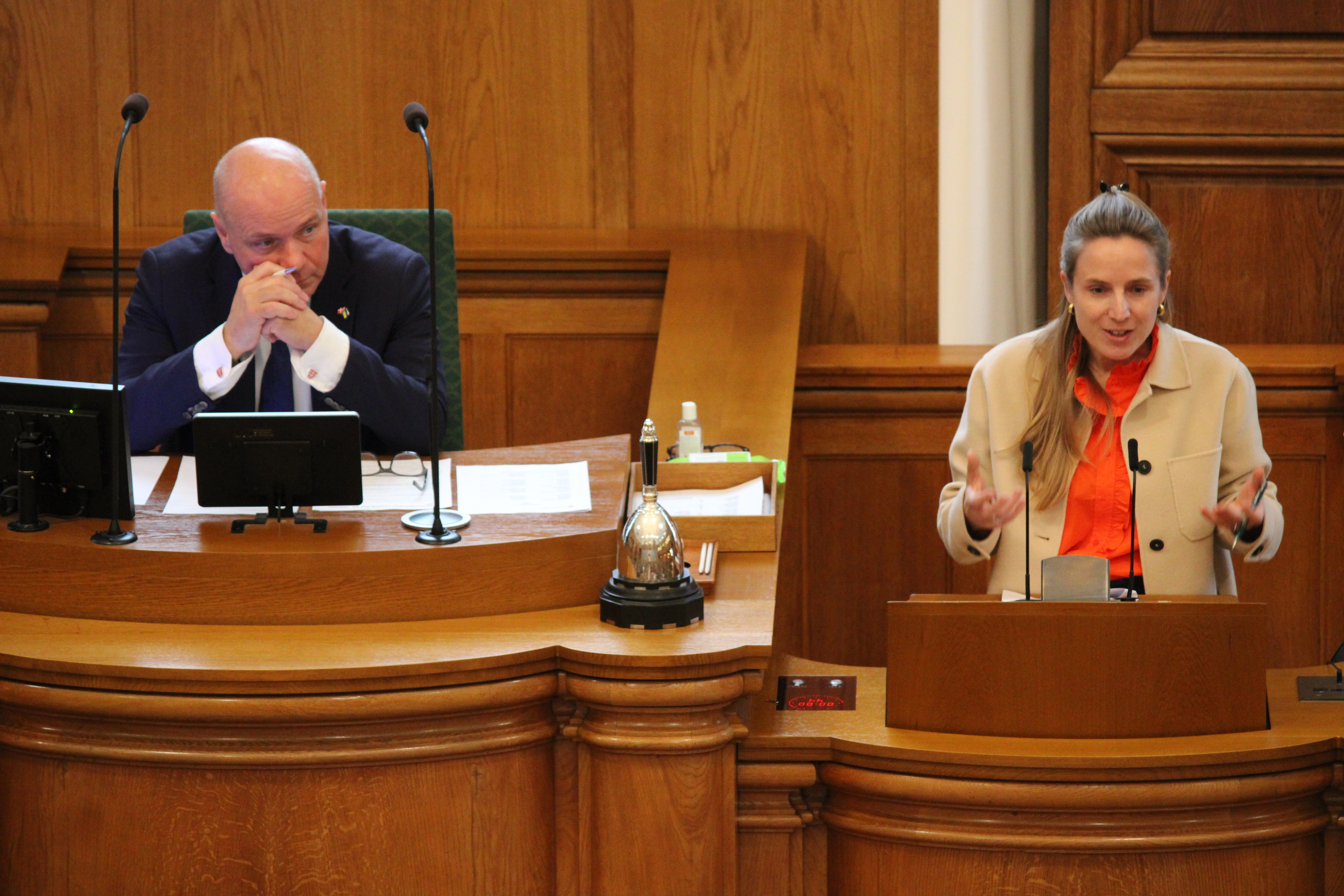
Gade presiding over a parliament meeting, October 2025

In 2022, following his re-election to the Folketing, a majority of parties supported Gade's candidacy for the position of speaker of the Folketing. Gade was officially confirmed as speaker on 16 November 2022.

== Controversy ==
In 2015, the newspaper Jyllands-Posten published a document that it said proved that Gade tried to hide the Danish military's agreement with security company Blackwater whose contractors killed 17 Iraqi civilians and wounded 20 in Baghdad's Nisour Square in 2007.

== Other activities ==
- European Leadership Network (ELN), Member of the Advisory Board

== Personal life ==
In January 2008, Gade's wife, Helle Buskbjerg Poulsen, died after years of battling cancer.

== Awards and decorations ==
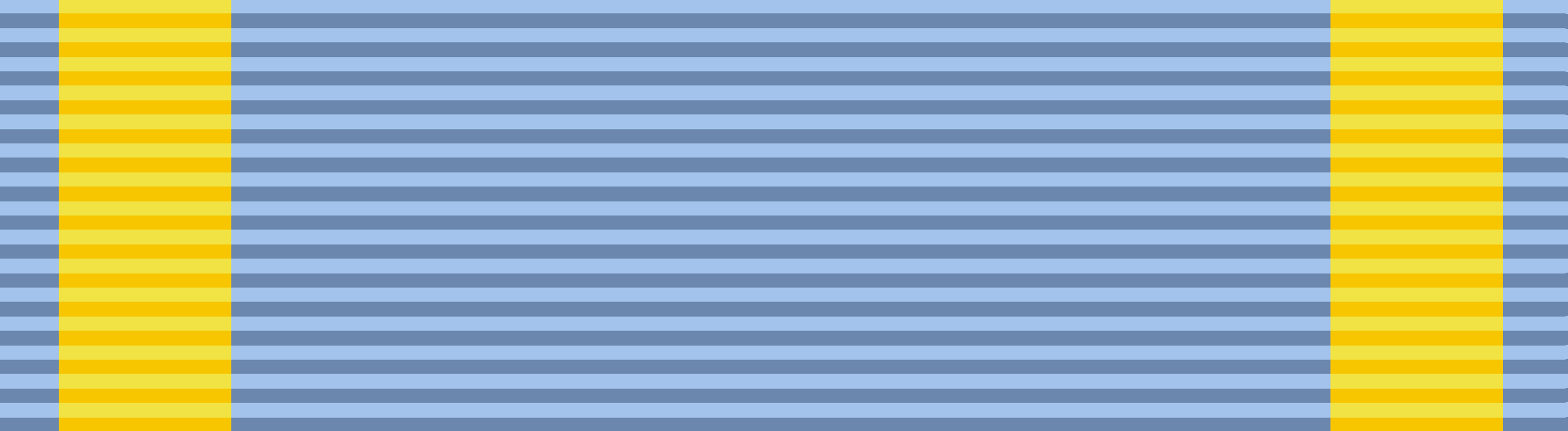
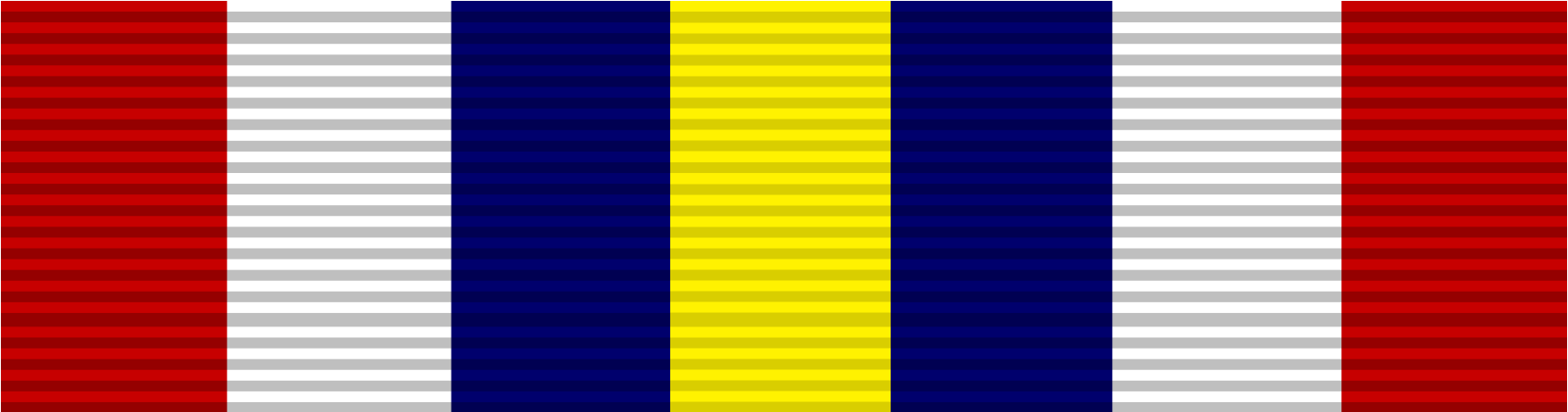
Commander 1st class of the Order of the Dannebrog
Grand Cross of the Order of the Falcon (Iceland)
Grand Cross of the Order of Civil Merit (Spain)
Grand Cordon of the Order of the Nile (Egypt)
Order of Prince Yaroslav the Wise 2nd class (Ukraine)
Homeguard Medal of Merit
Defence Medal for Meritorious Service
Defence Medal for International Service 1948–2009
Reserve Long Service Medal with 40 years oak leave
Homeguard 25 Years Service Decoration with 40 years oak leave
Badge of Honor of the Reserve Officers Association of Denmark
Peace Prize Medal (Denmark)
The Nordic Blue Berets Medal of Honour
Distinguished Public Service Award (USA)
UNTSO Medal for Service in the Middle East
Nijmegen Medal 2-4 times

Political offices
Preceded by Svend Aage Jensby	Defence Minister of Denmark; 2004–2010	Succeeded by Gitte Lillelund Bech
