= Orla Møller =

Danish priest and politician (1916–1979)

Minister of Justice
- In office 13 February 1975 – 1 October 1977
- Prime Minister: Anker Jørgensen
- Preceded by: Nathalie Lind
- Succeeded by: Erling Johannes Jensen

Minister of Defence
- In office 13 February 1975 – 1 October 1977
- Prime Minister: Anker Jørgensen
- Preceded by: Erling Brøndum
- Succeeded by: Poul Søgaard
- In office 27 September 1973 – 19 December 1973
- Prime Minister: Anker Jørgensen
- Preceded by: Kjeld Olesen
- Succeeded by: Erling Brøndum

Minister for Ecclesiastical Affairs
- In office 28 November 1966 – 2 February 1968
- Prime Minister: Jens Otto Krag
- Preceded by: Bodil Koch
- Succeeded by: Arne Fog Pedersen

Member of the Folketing
- In office 5 April 1964 – 1 October 1977
- Constituency: Ålborg (1964–1971); Nordjylland (1971–1977)

Personal details
- Born: Orla Reinhardt Møller; 7 May 1916 Feldballe, Mols, Denmark
- Died: 14 February 1979 (aged 62)
- Party: Social Democrats
- Profession: Priest

Orla Reinhardt Møller (7 May 1916 – 14 February 1979) was a Danish priest and politician who served in different cabinet posts in the 1960s and 1970s. He was a member of the Social Democrats and of the Parliament between 1964 and 1977.

== Early life ==
Møller was born in Feldballe, Mols, on 7 May 1916. He was educated as a priest. In 1951 he became general secretary of the Christian Association for Young Men and Women.

== Career ==
From 1956 and 1965 Møller worked as a parish priest in Hasseris, North Jutland. In 1964 he was elected to the Parliament for the Social Democrats and served there until 1977. He was the minister of ecclesiastes affairs in Prime Minister Jens Otto Krag's second cabinet between 28 November 1966 and 2 February 1968. From 1971 to 1973 he was the political spokesman and chairman of the Social Democrats' parliamentary group.

On 27 September 1973 he was named as the minister of justice to the first cabinet of Anker Jørgensen. He was in office until 19 December 1973. On 13 February 1975 Møller was appointed the minister of defense and justice in the second cabinet of Anker Jørgensen. On 1 October 1977 Møller resigned from the office due to the media reports about his private life. In January 1978 he began to work as the director of NATO's Information Office in Brussels.

== Personal life and death ==
Møller married twice. He first married in 1940. After divorcing his first wife on 7 January 1978 he married Winnie Lorentzen who would become a member of the Parliament. He died on 14 February 1979.
