= Alice Brask =

Danish politician

Member of the Folketing
- In office 3 October 1985 – 19 October 1985
- Constituency: Århus County
- In office 18 April 1989 – 4 May 1989

Personal details
- Born: 18 April 1938 (age 88) Auning, Denmark
- Party: Conservative

Alice Holst Brask (born 18 April 1938) is a Danish former politician from the Conservative People's Party.

== Biography ==
Brask was born in Auning in 1938 where her father ran a grocery store. She was the chairwoman of Norddjurs Conservative Voters' Association.

== See also ==
- List of members of the Folketing, 1984–1987
- List of members of the Folketing, 1988–1990
