= Minister for Greenland =

Former Danish cabinet post for affairs with Greenland

- Minister for Grønland
- State coat of arms of the Kingdom of Denmark
- Longest serving Jørgen Peder Hansen; 13 February 1975–20 January 1981
- Ministry of Greenland
- Type: Minister
- Member of: Cabinet; State Council
- Reports to: the Prime minister
- Seat: Slotsholmen
- Appointer: The Monarch (on the advice of the Prime Minister)
- Formation: 30 August 1955
- First holder: Svend Jakobsen
- Final holder: Mimi Jakobsen
- Abolished: 10 September 1987
- Succession: depending on the order in the State Council
- Deputy: Permanent Secretary

Minister of Greenland (Danish: Minister for Grønland) was a cabinet post for affairs with the Danish Arctic territory of Greenland.

Tom Høyem was Minister from 1982 until 1987, and was succeeded briefly by Mimi Jakobsen. In September 1987, the post was eliminated, and responsibility was transferred to the Prime Minister's Office.

Since 1979, Greenland has been governed locally through Home Rule with a parliament.

== List of ministers ==
No.	Portrait	Name (born–died)	Term of office			Political party	Government	Ref.
No.	Portrait	Name (born–died)	Took office	Left office	Time in office	Political party	Government	Ref.
1		Johannes Kjærbøl (1885–1973)	30 August 1955	28 May 1957	1 year, 271 days	Social Democrats	Hansen I	
2		Kai Lindberg (1899–1985)	28 May 1957	18 October 1960	3 years, 143 days	Social Democrats	Hansen II; Kampmann I	
3		Mikael Gam (1901–1982)	18 October 1960	26 September 1964	3 years, 344 days	Independent	Kampmann II; Krag I	
4		Carl P. Jensen (1906–1987)	26 September 1964	2 February 1968	3 years, 129 days	Social Democrats	Krag II	
5		Arnold C. Normann (1904–1978)	2 February 1968	11 October 1971	3 years, 251 days	Social Liberal Party	Baunsgaard	
6		Knud Hertling (1925–2010)	11 October 1971	19 December 1973	2 years, 69 days	Social Democrats	Krag III; Jørgensen I	
7		Holger Hansen (1929–2015)	19 December 1973	13 February 1975	1 year, 56 days	Venstre	Hartling	
8		Jørgen Peder Hansen (1923–1994)	13 February 1975	20 January 1981	5 years, 342 days	Social Democrats	Jørgensen II–III–IV	
9		Tove Lindbo Larsen (1928–2018)	20 January 1981	10 September 1982	1 year, 233 days	Social Democrats	Jørgensen IV–V	
10		Tom Høyem (born 1941)	10 September 1982	1 September 1987	4 years, 356 days	Centre Democrats	Schlüter I	
11		Mimi Jakobsen (born 1948)	1 September 1987	10 September 1987	9 days	Centre Democrats	Schlüter I	
