= Tove Lindbo Larsen =

Danish politician (1928–2018)

Minister for Ecclesiastical Affairs
- In office 20 January 1981 – 10 September 1982
- Prime Minister: Anker Jørgensen
- Preceded by: Jørgen Peder Hansen
- Succeeded by: Elsebeth Kock-Petersen

Minister for Greenland
- In office 20 January 1981 – 10 September 1982
- Prime Minister: Anker Jørgensen
- Preceded by: Jørgen Peder Hansen
- Succeeded by: Tom Høyem

Member of the Folketing for Søndre Storkreds
- In office 10 May 1988 – 10 March 1998
- In office 15 February 1977 – 7 September 1987

Member of the Folketing for Vestre Storkreds
- In office 21 September 1971 – 3 December 1973

Personal details
- Born: Dorte Marianne Bennedsen; 25 December 1928 Copenhagen, Denmark
- Died: 29 September 2018 (aged 89) Frederiksberg, Denmark
- Party: Social Democrats
- Spouse: Verner Lindbo (m. 1953; died 2008)
- Children: 2

Tove Kirsten Lindbo Larsen (25 December 1928 – 29 September 2018) was a Danish Social Democrats politician who served as Minister for Ecclesiastical Affairs and Minister for Greenland from early 1981 to late 1982 in the government of Anker Jørgensen. She also served a total of 22 years as a member of the Folketing for firstly the Vestre Storkreds and then the Søndre Storkreds constituencies between most years from 1971 to 1998.

== Early life ==
Larsen was born in Copenhagen on 25 December 1928. She was the daughter of the director Angelo Karlsen and Laurine Nielsen. In 1945, Larsen passed her high school diploma and went on to work as an office assistant from 1945 to 1949. She changed her degree to become a seminary-trained household and nutrition teacher in 1951.

== Career ==
Between 1951 and 1953, Larsen worked at Mariaforbundet's household school as a teacher. She became a member of the Social Democrats political party in 1953. From 1955 to 1958, Larsen worked as a consultant in the Frederiksberg Municipality, where she worked in collaboration with Ellis Tardini. She went on to work as dietican at Rigshospitalet's pediatric ward between 1958 and 1961 and developed a specific dietican's work space. Larsen educated pupils on dietetics and nursing at some educational institutions such as Zahles Seminary from 1958 to 1971 and at Copenhagen Vocational School for Nursing Staff between 1967 and 1971. She was also a teacher at nursing schools in Frederiksberg Municipality and Copenhagen County from 1961 to 1971.

Larsen served as chair of the Social Democratic Women in Frederiksberg between 1956 and 1963 and was a board member of the social democratic voters 'association Frederiksberg Slotskredsen in the same period of time. She went to be appointed a member of the executive committee of the Social Democratic Women in Copenhagen, working in the role from 1966 to 1969. From 1964 to 1971, Larsen was a board member of the voters' association København Valbykredsen. She was chair of the Pensioners' Cooperative in Copenhagen from 1969 to 1975 and was a member of the Danish Food Council between 1972 and 1981 and again in 1987. She worked for Brugsforeningen HB as a board member between 1969 and 1972, was on FBD's board from 1972 to 1981 before serving as its deputy chair in the last three years she was there.

Larsen was vice-chair of the Pensioners' Cooperative in Denmark from 1966 to 1978 (again from 1994) and was its chair between 1978 and 1981, where she lobbied for improved conditions for pensioners and sought the possibility of obtaining healthier food. She was president of the Home Teachers Association between 1973 and 1979. There, she had the objective of modernising the trade union and was able to get the Civil Servants 'Central Organization, the Teachers' Central Organization and the Joint Council of Danish Civil Servants, the Civil Servants' Organizations and the unemployment fund organised into a composite group. Larsen was representative of the Workers' Information Association (AOF) in the State Household Council from 1967 to 1981. She also performed the same role in the Danish Consumer Council from 1983 to 1995. Larsen was deputy chair of the Board of Bikuben Invest from 1984 to 1995, and between 1986 and 1993, was a member of the Port of Copenhagen's board. She was from 1990 to 1993 on the YMCA's Seminary Board of Representatives.

She unsuccessfully stood for election to represent the Gl. Kongevejkredsen constituency at the 1970 Danish local elections. During the 1971 Danish general election, she was elected to represent the Vestre Storkreds in the Folketing from 21 September of that year. Larsen continued to represent the constituency until the 3 December 1973 when the Social Democrats suffered heavy losses at the 1973 Danish general election. She stood to represent the Sundby District constituency but was not successful in gaining election. Larsen went to gain election to represent the Søndre Storkreds constituency the Folketing at the 1977 Danish general election on 15 February of that year and left at the 1987 Danish general election on 7 September that year. At the 1988 Danish general election on 10 May, she got re-elected to the same constituency and served as its elected member until the 1998 Danish general election on 10 March that year.

From 1979 to 1981, Larsen served as chair of the Folketing's Business Committee. She was appointed a double minister as both Minister for Greenland and Minister for Ecclesiastical Affairs in two minister rounds lasting from 20 January 1981 to 10 September 1982 under the premiership of Anker Jørgensen. She resigned both jobs when Poul Schlüter was elected to replace Jørgensen as Prime Minister of Denmark. Larsen was influential in the adoption of a nutrition policy across Denmark in 1984, and was cited as having given greater understanding of the social and societal significance of nutrition and recognising that housekeeping is also a problem for society. She was a member of the Central Science Ethics Committee between 1998 and 2002 and was chair of the Association of Former Members of Parliament from 2002 to 2011 in place of the editor Erik Finnemann Bruun.

== Personal life ==
From 2 May 1953 to his death in 2008, Larsen was married to the engineer Verner Lindbo. They had two children. She died in Frederiksberg on 29 September 2018. Larsen received a funeral service soon after.
