= Poul Hansen =

Danish politician

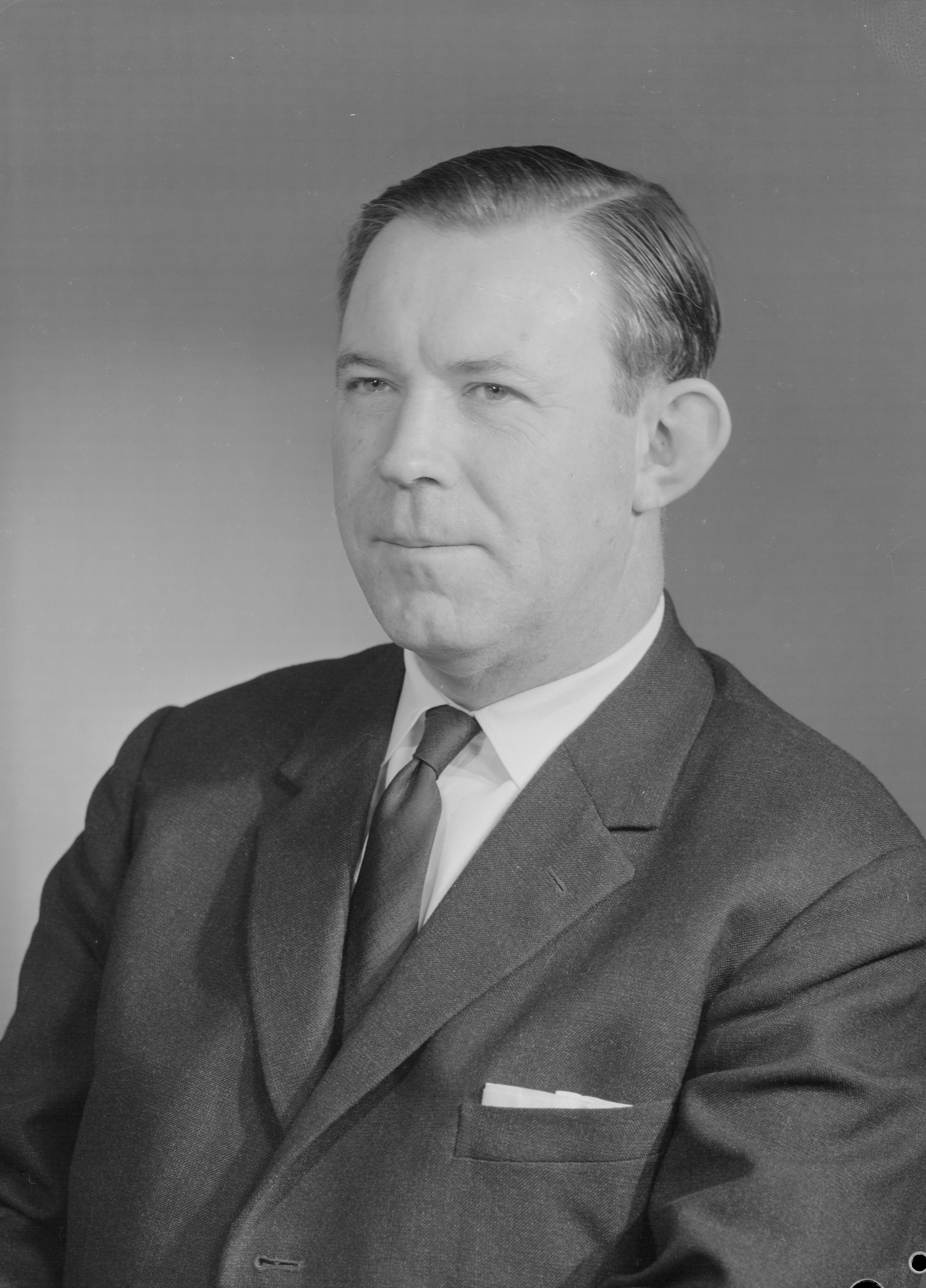

Minister for Finance
- In office 15 November 1962 – 24 August 1965
- Prime Minister: Jens Otto Krag
- Preceded by: Hans R. Knudsen
- Succeeded by: Henry Grünbaum

Minister of Defence
- In office 25 May 1956 – 15 November 1962
- Prime Minister: H. C. Hansen; Viggo Kampmann; Jens Otto Krag
- Preceded by: Rasmus Hansen
- Succeeded by: Victor Gram

Minister for Economic Affairs
- Acting
- In office 26 September 1964 – 8 October 1964
- Prime Minister: Jens Otto Krag
- Preceded by: Kjeld Philip
- Succeeded by: Henry Grünbaum

Personal details
- Born: 27 February 1913 Copenhagen, Denmark
- Died: 13 August 1966 (aged 53) Virum, Denmark
- Party: Social Democrats

Hans Christian Poul Hansen (27 February 1913 – 13 August 1966), simply known as Poul Hansen, was a Danish politician, who served as Defence Minister of Denmark from 1956 to 1962 and Danish Minister of Finance from 1962 to 1965. He represented the Social Democrats in the Folketinget parliament for 21 years.

Born in Copenhagen, from 1937 to 1942, Hansen served as chairman of the Social Democratic Youth of Denmark, and he later worked as a journalist for a Social Democratic newspaper. In 1945, he was elected to the Danish Folketinget parliament. Hansen was named Defence Minister by Prime Minister of Denmark H. C. Hansen on 25 May 1956, replacing Rasmus Hansen. In the subsequent governments of Viggo Kampmann and Jens Otto Krag, Hansen retained this position. On 15 November 1962, Hansen moved from his position as Defence Minister to replace the recently deceased Hans R. Knudsen as Minister of Finance. As Jens Otto Krag did not have a Danish Minister of Economic Affairs ready for his newly elected government on 26 September 1964, Hansen served as interim Minister of Finance and Economic Affairs both for two weeks, until Henry Grünbaum was named permanent Minister of Economic Affairs on 8 October 1964.

== Ministerial positions ==
Hansen was named minister in several cabinets from 1956 to 1965:

- Minister of Defence in the First cabinet of H. C. Hansen from May 25, 1956, to May 28, 1957
- Minister of Defence in the Second cabinet of H. C. Hansen from May 28, 1957, to February 21, 1960
- Minister of Defence in the First cabinet of Viggo Kampmann from February 21, 1960, to November 18, 1960
- Minister of Defence in the Second cabinet of Viggo Kampmann from November 18, 1960, to September 3, 1962
- Minister of Defence in the First cabinet of Jens Otto Krag from September 3, 1962, to November 15, 1962
- Minister of Finance in the First cabinet of Jens Otto Krag from November 15, 1962, to September 26, 1964
- Minister of Finance and Economic Affairs in the Second cabinet of Jens Otto Krag from September 26, 1964, to October 8, 1964
- Minister of Finance in the Second cabinet of Jens Otto Krag from October 8, 1964, to August 25, 1965

Political offices
| Preceded by Rasmus Hansen | Defence Minister of Denmark; 25 May 1956 – 15 November 1962 | Succeeded by Victor Gram |
| Preceded by Hans R. Knudsen | Finance Minister of Denmark; 15 November 1962 – 24 August 1965 | Succeeded by Henry Grünbaum |
