= Poul Søgaard =

Danish politician

Minister of Defence
- In office 1 October 1977 – 10 September 1982
- Prime Minister: Anker Jørgensen
- Preceded by: Orla Møller
- Succeeded by: Hans Engell

Member of the Folketing
- In office 1960–1990

Member of the Odense City Council
- In office 1954–1960

Personal details
- Born: 12 November 1923 Dalum, Odense
- Died: 13 December 2016 (aged 93)
- Party: Social Democrats (since 1939)
- Occupation: Politician

Poul Søgaard (né Pedersen; 12 November 1923 – 13 December 2016) was a Danish politician.

Shortly after his 1923 birth in Odense, Poul Pedersen was adopted by Johannes Søgaard, and his name was changed accordingly. In 1939, Poul Søgaard joined the Social Democrats. He was elected to the party council for Odense in 1951, and three years later began serving on the city Council. He ran for and won a seat on the Folketing in 1960. Søgaard was a parliamentarian for thirty years until he stepped down in 1990. In the midst of his legislative career, Søgaard also served as defence minister under Anker Jørgensen from 1977 to 1982.
