= Asger Baunsbak-Jensen =

Danish politician (1932–2026)

Member of the Folketing
- In office 10 January 1984 – 14 March 1984
- Constituency: Viborg County

Personal details
- Born: 15 April 1932 Holbæk, Denmark
- Died: 8 July 2026 (aged 94) Farum, Denmark
- Party: RV
- Occupation: Politician

Asger Baunsbak-Jensen (15 April 1932 – 8 July 2026) was a Danish politician. A member of the Danish Social Liberal Party, he served in the Folketing from January to March 1984.

Baunsbak-Jensen died on 8 July 2026, at the age of 94.
