= Kjeld Olesen =

Danish politician (1932–2024)

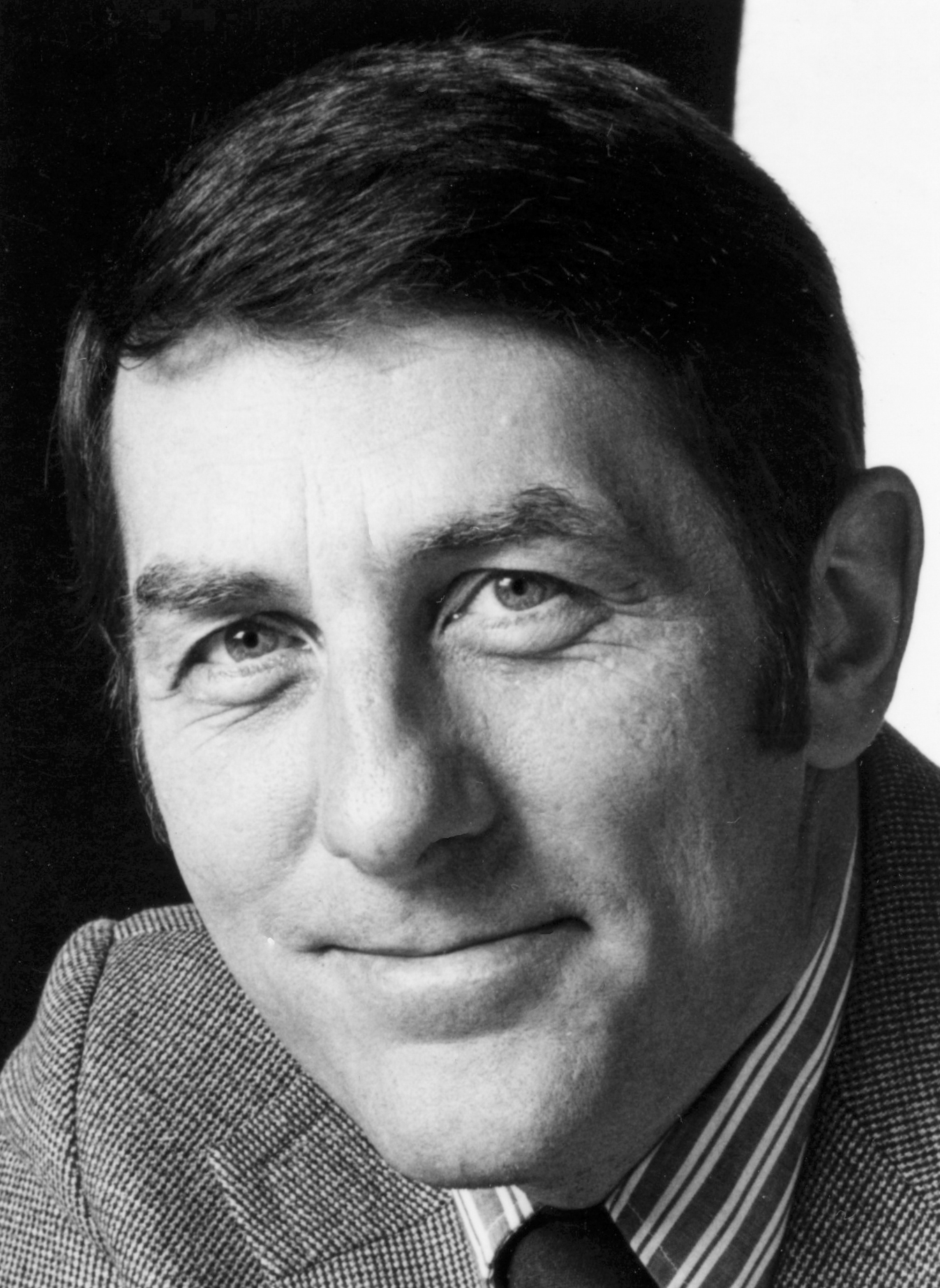

Minister of Foreign Affairs
- In office 26 October 1979 – 10 September 1982
- Prime Minister: Anker Jørgensen
- Preceded by: Henning Christophersen
- Succeeded by: Uffe Ellemann-Jensen

Personal details
- Born: 8 July 1932 Copenhagen, Denmark
- Died: 25 July 2024 (aged 92)
- Party: Social Democrats
- Spouses: Hanne Vibeke Hansen (1962); Lis Holm (1992)

Kjeld Olesen (8 July 1932 – 25 July 2024) was a Danish Social Democratic politician who served as Minister for Foreign Affairs of Denmark from 1979 to 1982.

== Career ==
In 1955, Olesen was part of the CIA team that secretly listened in on the leftist politicians Ragnhild Andersen and Alfred Jensen. He also worked in a private intelligence organisation called Arbejdernes Informations Central (Danish: Information Centre of the Labour Movement), financed by the labour movement. Its employers were members of the Social Democratic Party. Later, Olesen became a member of Parliament (1966–1987) and served as deputy chairman of the Social Democratic Party in the 1970s. He served in several cabinet positions, most notably as foreign minister and defence minister. Following his exit from politics, he resumed his old profession as a sailor.

== Personal life and death ==
Kjeld Støttrup Olesen was born on 8 July 1932 in Copenhagen to Anker Olesen (1902–1955) and Severa Madsen (1908–1973). His father, Anker, was among the resistance members against Nazi Germany during World War II. In 1962, he married Hanne Vibeke Hansen (b. 1937) at Hadsund Church. He remarried in 1992 to Lis Holm, a teacher.

Olesen died on 25 July 2024, at the age of 92.

Political offices
Preceded by Knud Østergaard	Defence Minister of Denmark; 11 October 1971 – 27 September 1973	Succeeded by Orla Møller
Preceded by Niels Matthiasen	Minister for Public Works; 26 February 1977 – 30 August 1978	Succeeded by Ivar Hansen
Preceded by Henning Christophersen	Foreign Minister of Denmark; 26 October 1979 – 10 September 1982	Succeeded by Uffe Ellemann-Jensen
