= Victor Gram =

Danish politician (1910–1969)

Minister of Defence
- In office 15 November 1962 – 2 February 1968
- Prime Minister: Jens Otto Krag
- Preceded by: Poul Hansen
- Succeeded by: Erik Ninn-Hansen

Member of the Folketing
- In office 3 April 1943 – 12 February 1969
- Constituency: Vejle

Personal details
- Born: Victor Bernhard Gram; 30 January 1910 Højby, Denmark
- Died: 12 February 1969 (aged 59) Copenhagen, Denmark
- Resting place: Fredericia, Denmark
- Party: Social Democrats

Victor Gram (30 January 1910 – 12 February 1969) was a Danish politician who was a member of the Social Democrats (. He was the minister of defence between 1962 and 1968 and a long-term member of the Parliament (1943–1969).

== Biography ==
Gram was born in Højby on 30 January 1910. At age 16 he became a member of the Social Democratic Youth of Denmark which he headed between 1942 and 1946. Then he joined the Social Democrats and served at the Parliament from 3 April 1943 to 12 February 1969. In 1948 he was appointed a member of the Greenland Comission, one of two representatives from the Folketing (Danish Parliament) alongside Oluf Steen. On 15 November 1962 Gram was appointed minister of defense. He remained in the post until 2 February 1968. The cabinets were headed by Prime Minister Jens Otto Krag.

Gram died in Copenhagen on 12 February 1969 and was buried in Fredericia.
