= Mimi Jakobsen =

Danish politician

- Born: 19 November 1948 (age 77); Copenhagen, Denmark
- Occupations: Politician, government minister, secretary general
- Political party: Centre Democrats (1989–2005), Social Democrat Party (2006–present)

Mimi Jakobsen (born 19 November 1948 in Copenhagen) is a Danish former politician and government minister and secretary general of the Danish chapter of the International Save the Children Alliance. After 15 years she resigned from her position as secretary general of Save the Children Denmark on 17 June 2015.

From 1989 to 2005 she was leader of the Centre Democrats, a political party formed by her father, former Social Democrat Erhard Jakobsen, in 1973. She was minister of culture in the mid-1980s.

On the 21 December 2006 she announced that she joined the Social Democratic party.

Political offices
Preceded by Lise Østergaard	Culture Minister of Denmark; 10 September 1982 – 12 March 1986	Succeeded by Hans Peter Clausen
Preceded by Elsebeth Koch-Petersen	Social Minister of Denmark; 12 March 1986 – 3 June 1988	Succeeded by Aase Olesen
Preceded by Tom Høyem	Minister for Greenland; 1 September 1987 – 10 September 1987	Succeeded by Office abolished
Preceded by Office created	Minister for Business Coordination of Denmark; 21 January 1993 – 28 January 1994	Succeeded by Office abolished
Preceded by Jan Trøjborg	Industry Minister of Denmark; 28 January 1994 – 30 December 1996	Succeeded by Jan Trøjborg
