= Hans Engell =

Danish politician and journalist

Hans Engell (born 8 October 1948) is a Danish former politician and journalist, who until 6 September 2007 was the editor-in-chief of the tabloid Ekstra Bladet, a position he had held for seven years. As a member of the Conservative People's Party, he was Defence Minister of Denmark between 1982 and 1987, Justice Minister between 1989 and 1993, and leader of the party from 1993 to 1997, until he retired in disgrace after a drunk-driving incident.

Hans Engell is currently a political commentator and analyst in Ekstra Bladet and on Danish television (e.g. TV 2 News and Jersild Live). On 6 September 2007, Hans Engell was fired as editor-in-chief of Ekstra Bladet because JP/Politikens Hus wanted the successful editor of 24timer, Poul Madsen, to lead the paper due to fierce competition in the newspaper industry.

Political offices
Preceded by Poul Søgaard	Defence Minister of Denmark; 10 September 1982 – 10 September 1987	Succeeded by Bernt Johan Collet
Preceded by Poul Schlüter	Justice Minister of Denmark; 5 October 1989 – 25 January 1993	Succeeded by Pia Gjellerup
Party political offices
Preceded by Henning Dyremose	Leader of the Conservative People's Party; 1993–1997	Succeeded by Per Stig Møller
