= Kai Lindberg =

Danish politician (1899-1985)

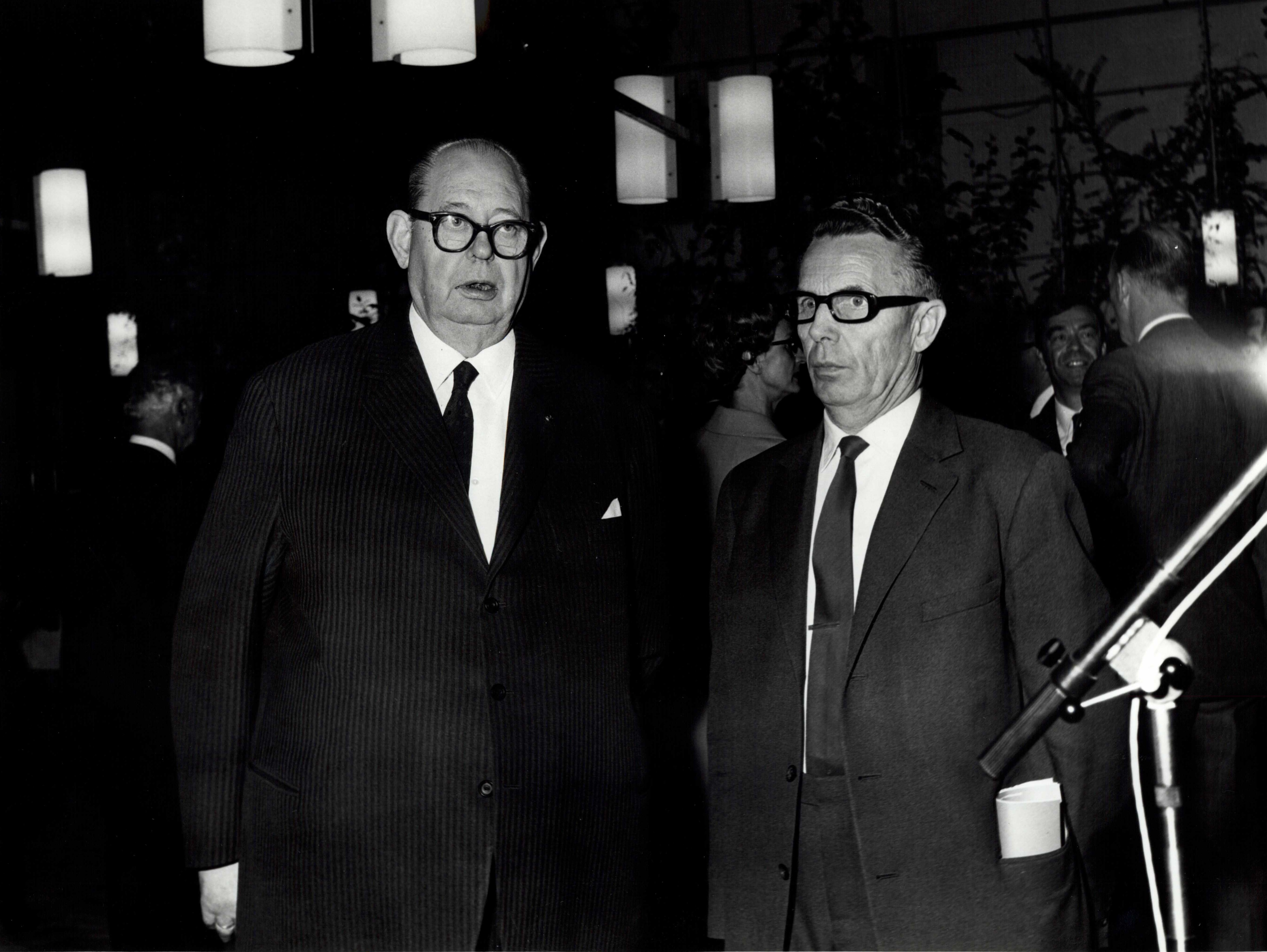
Lindberg (left) at the inauguration of the Frederikssundsvej tunnel, 1969.

Kai Lindberg (December 10, 1899 – May 27, 1985) was a Danish politician. He served as the second Minister for Greenland from 1957 to 1960, and also the Minister of Public Works. He was a Social Democrat.
