= Minister for Economic Affairs (Denmark) =

Danish cabinet position

Minister of Economic Affairs
- Økonomiminister
- State coat of arms of the Kingdom of Denmark

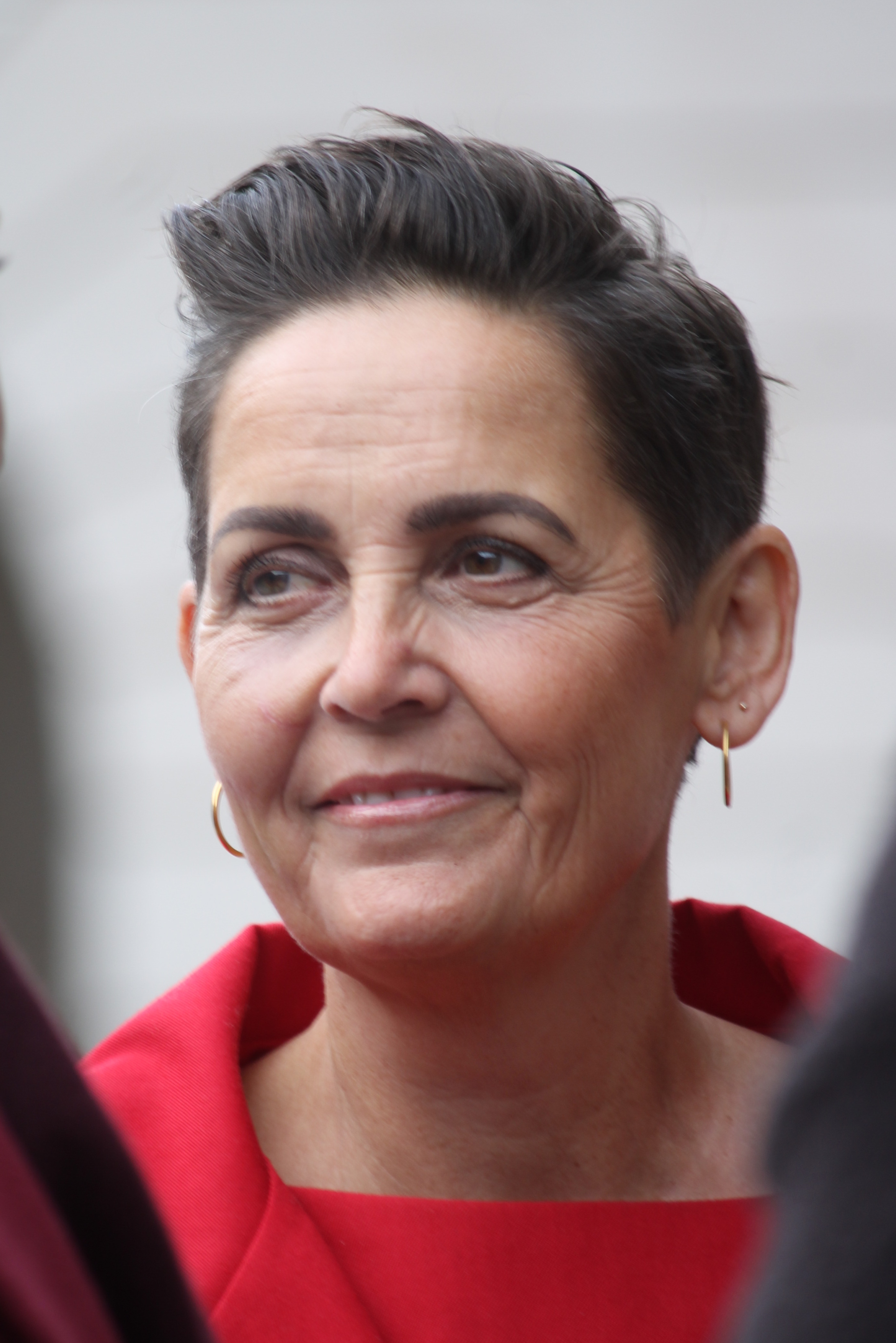
- Incumbent; Pia Olsen Dyhr since 3 June 2026
- Ministry of Economic Affairs
- Type: Minister
- Member of: Cabinet; State Council
- Reports to: the Prime minister
- Seat: Slotsholmen
- Appointer: The Monarch; (on the advice of the Prime Minister)
- Formation: 24 April 1947
- First holder: Vilhelm Buhl
- Succession: depending on the order in the State Council
- Deputy: Permanent Secretary
- Salary: 1.786.953,32 DKK (€239,724), in 2026
- Website: Official website

The Minister for Economic Affairs (Danish: Økonomiminister) is a Danish ministerial title, following a split from the Minister for Finance. The position was at a point joined with the Minister of Business Affairs.

== List of ministers ==
| No. | Portrait | Name (born–died) | Term of office | | | Political party | Government | Ref. |
| No. | Portrait | Name (born–died) | Took office | Left office | Time in office | Political party | Government | Ref. |
Minister without Portfolio with focus on economic policies (Minister uden portefølje med henblik på den økonomiske politik)
| 1 | | Vilhelm Buhl (1881–1954) | 13 November 1947 | 30 October 1950 | 2 years, 351 days | Social Democrats | Hedtoft I–II | |
Minister of Economic Affairs and Labour (Økonomi- og arbejdsminister)
| 2 | | Jens Otto Krag (1914–1978) | 30 September 1953 | 28 May 1957 | 3 years, 208 days | Social Democrats | Hedtoft III; Hansen I | |
Minister of Economic Affairs (Økonomiminister)
| 3 | | Bertel Dahlgaard (1887–1972) | 28 May 1957 | 7 September 1961 | 4 years, 102 days | Social Liberal | Hansen II; Kampmann I–II | |
| 4 | | Kjeld Philip (1912–1989) | 7 September 1961 | 26 September 1964 | 3 years, 19 days | Social Liberal | Kampmann II; Krag I | |
| 5 | | Poul Hansen (1913–1966) | 26 September 1964 | 8 October 1964 | 12 days | Social Democrats | Krag II | |
| 6 | | Henry Grünbaum (1911–2006) | 8 October 1964 | 24 August 1965 | 320 days | Social Democrats | Krag II | |
| 7 | | Ivar Nørgaard (1922–2011) | 24 August 1965 | 2 February 1968 | 2 years, 162 days | Social Democrats | Krag II | |
| 8 | | Poul Nyboe Andersen (1913–2004) | 2 February 1968 | 11 October 1971 | 3 years, 251 days | Venstre | Baunsgaard | |
Minister of Economic and Budgetary Affairs (Økonomi- og budgetminister)
| 9 | | Per Hækkerup (1915–1979) | 11 October 1971 | 27 September 1973 | 1 year, 351 days | Social Democrats | Krag III; Jørgensen I | |
Minister of Economic Affairs (Økonomiminister)
| (9) | | Per Hækkerup (1915–1979) | 27 September 1973 | 19 December 1973 | 83 days | Social Democrats | Jørgensen I | |
Minister of Economic Affairs and Trade (Økonomi- og handelsminister)
| 10 | | Poul Nyboe Andersen (1913–2004) | 19 December 1973 | 29 January 1975 | 1 year, 41 days | Venstre | Hartling | |
Minister of Economic Affairs (Økonomiminister)
| (9) | | Per Hækkerup (1915–1979) | 29 January 1975 | 30 August 1978 | 3 years, 213 days | Social Democrats | Jørgensen II | |
| 11 | | Anders Andersen (1912–2006) | 30 August 1978 | 26 October 1979 | 1 year, 57 days | Venstre | Jørgensen III | |
| (7) | | Ivar Nørgaard (1922–2011) | 26 October 1979 | 10 September 1982 | 2 years, 319 days | Social Democrats | Jørgensen IV–V | |
| (11) | | Anders Andersen (1912–2006) | 10 September 1982 | 10 September 1987 | 1 year, 57 days | Venstre | Schlüter I | |
| 12 | | Knud Enggaard (1929–2024) | 10 September 1987 | 3 June 1988 | 267 days | Venstre | Schlüter II | |
| 13 | | Niels Helveg Petersen (1939–2017) | 3 June 1988 | 18 December 1990 | 2 years, 198 days | Social Liberal | Schlüter III | |
| 14 | | Anders Fogh Rasmussen (born 1953) | 18 December 1990 | 19 November 1992 | 1 year, 337 days | Venstre | Schlüter IV | |
| 15 | | Thor Pedersen (born 1945) | 19 November 1992 | 25 January 1993 | 67 days | Venstre | Schlüter IV | |
| 16 | | Marianne Jelved (born 1943) | 25 January 1993 | 27 November 2001 | 8 years, 306 days | Social Liberal | P. N. Rasmussen I–II–III–IV | |
Minister of Economic and Business Affairs (Økonomi- og Erhvervsminister)
| 17 | | Bendt Bendtsen (born 1954) | 27 November 2001 | 10 September 2008 | 6 years, 288 days | Conservative People's Party | A. F. Rasmussen I–II–III | |
| 18 | | Lene Espersen (born 1965) | 10 September 2008 | 23 February 2010 | 1 year, 166 days | Conservative People's Party | A. F. Rasmussen III; L. L. Rasmussen I | |
| 19 | | Brian Mikkelsen (born 1966) | 23 February 2010 | 3 October 2011 | 1 year, 222 days | Conservative People's Party | L. L. Rasmussen I | |
Minister of Economic and Interior Affairs (Økonomi- og indenrigsminister)
| 20 | | Margrethe Vestager (born 1968) | 3 October 2011 | 2 September 2014 | 2 years, 334 days | Social Liberal | Thorning-Schmidt I–II | |
| 21 | | Morten Østergaard (born 1976) | 2 September 2014 | 28 June 2015 | 299 days | Social Liberal | Thorning-Schmidt II | |
| 22 | | Simon Emil Ammitzbøll-Bille (born 1977) | 28 November 2016 | 27 June 2019 | 2 years, 211 days | Liberal Alliance | L.L. Rasmussen III | |
Minister of Economic Affairs (Økonomiminister)
| 23 | | Troels Lund Poulsen (born 1976) | 15 December 2022 | 22 August 2023 | 250 days | Venstre | Frederiksen II | |
| 24 | | Jakob Ellemann-Jensen (born 1973) | 22 August 2023 | 23 October 2023 | 62 days | Venstre | Frederiksen II | |
| (23) | | Troels Lund Poulsen (born 1976) | 23 October 2023 | 23 November 2023 | 31 days | Venstre | Frederiksen II | |
| 25 | | Stephanie Lose (born 1982) | 23 November 2023 | 3 June 2026 | 2 years, 192 days | Venstre | Frederiksen II | |
Minister of Economic Affairs and the Interior (Økonomi- og indenrigsminister)
| 26 | | Pia Olsen Dyhr (born 1971) | 3 June 2026 | Incumbent | 143 days | Green Left | Frederiksen III | |
