= Anders Ejnar Andersen =

Danish politician (1912–2006)

Minister for Economic Affairs
- In office 10 September 1982 – 10 September 1987
- Prime Minister: Poul Schlüter
- Preceded by: Ivar Nørgaard
- Succeeded by: Knud Enggaard
- In office 30 August 1978 – 26 October 1979
- Prime Minister: Anker Jørgensen
- Preceded by: Per Hækkerup
- Succeeded by: Ivar Nørgaard

Minister for Taxation
- In office 30 August 1978 – 26 October 1979
- Prime Minister: Anker Jørgensen
- Preceded by: Jens Kampmann
- Succeeded by: Karl Hjortnæs

Minister for Finance
- In office 19 December 1973 – 13 February 1975
- Prime Minister: Poul Hartling
- Preceded by: Henry Grünbaum
- Succeeded by: Knud Heinesen

Personal details
- Born: 1 October 1912 Voldby, Denmark
- Died: 13 April 2006 (aged 93) Voldby, Denmark
- Party: Venstre
- Spouse: Karen Margrethe Bilde Sørensen (m. 1937)

Anders Ejnar Andersen (1 October 1912 – 13 April 2006) was a Danish politician who was a member of Venstre and held various government posts, including minister of finance and minister of economic affairs in the 1970s and 1980s.

== Early life and education ==
Andersen was born in Voldby on 1 October 1912. He attended Ladelund agricultural school in the period 1935–1936.

== Career ==
Andersen was member of the Danish parliament for the Venstre representing Aarhus County and then Randers County. He was first elected to the Parliament in 1953 and served there from 1953 to 1979 and from 1981 to 1984.

Andersen was the minister of finance in the cabinet led by Poul Hartling from 19 December 1973 to 13 February 1975. Then he served as the minister of economic affairs and minister of taxation between 30 August 1978 and 26 October 1979 in the cabinet of Anker Jørgensen. Andersen also served as the minister of economic affairs from 10 September 1982 to 10 September 1987 in the cabinet led by Poul Schlüter. Following the end of his tenure Andersen retired from politics.

== Personal life and death ==
Andersen married Karen Margrethe Bilde Sørensen in Voldby on 10 October 1937. He had a farm near Voldby. He died in Voldby on 13 April 2006 and was buried there.

=== Awards ===
Andersen was awarded the Commander 1st Class of the Order of the Dannebrog in 1979.
