= Per Hækkerup =

Danish politician

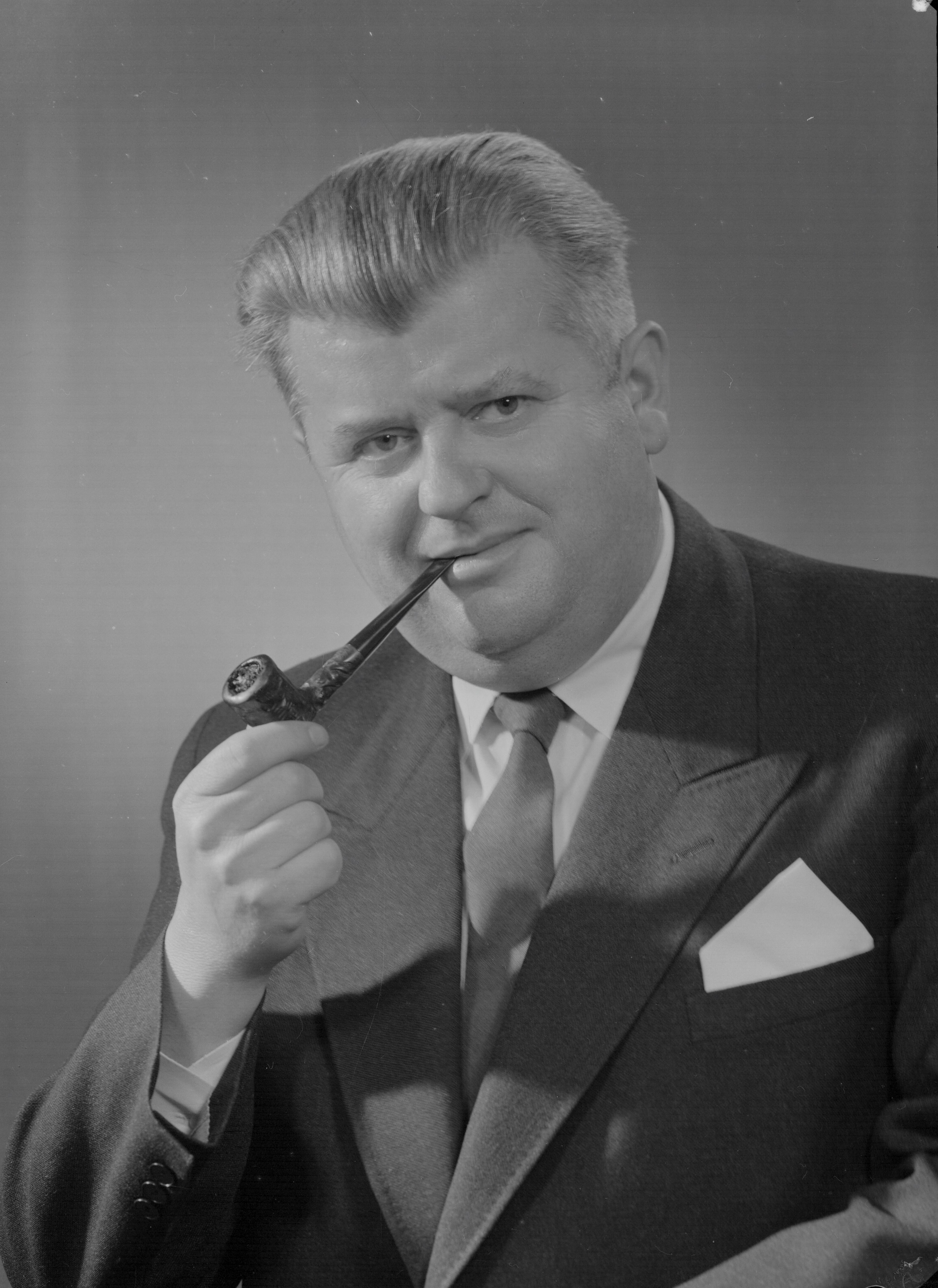

Minister for Foreign Affairs
- In office 3 September 1962 – 28 November 1966
- Prime Minister: Jens Otto Krag
- Preceded by: Jens Otto Krag
- Succeeded by: Jens Otto Krag

Minister for Economic Affairs
- In office 13 February 1975 – 30 August 1978
- Prime Minister: Anker Jørgensen
- Preceded by: Poul Nyboe Andersen
- Succeeded by: Anders Andersen
- In office 11 October 1971 – 19 December 1973
- Prime Minister: Jens Otto Krag; Anker Jørgensen
- Preceded by: Poul Nyboe Andersen
- Succeeded by: Poul Nyboe Andersen

Minister of Trade, Crafts, Industry and Seafaring
- In office 8 September 1976 – 26 February 1977
- Prime Minister: Anker Jørgensen
- Preceded by: Erling Jensen
- Succeeded by: Ivar Nørgaard

Minister without portfolio with special attention to economic coordination
- In office 30 August 1978 – 13 March 1979
- Prime Minister: Anker Jørgensen
- Preceded by: New office
- Succeeded by: Office abolished

Personal details
- Born: 25 December 1915 Ringsted, Denmark
- Died: 13 March 1979 (aged 63) Herritslev, Denmark
- Party: Social Democrats
- Spouse: Grethe Hækkerup (1939–1979)

Per Hækkerup (25 December 1915 – 13 March 1979) was a Danish Social Democratic politician, who served as Foreign Minister of Denmark from 1962 to 1966.

Hækkerup, the son of Hans Kristian Hækkerup, a politician, was active in politics from the end of the Second World War to his death in 1979. He was the chairman of the youth organization of the Danish Social Democrats from 1946 to 1952 and the secretary general of International Union of Socialist Youth from 1946 to 1951.

Hækkerup is most widely known for the agreement he reached with the Norwegian Minister Jens Evensen that gave Norway the oil-rich Ekofisk oil field in the North Sea. According to an urban legend, Hækkerup was drunk when he signed the agreement, but Danish historians today agree that the agreement was most fair and that Hækkerup was not drunk.

He was married to Grethe Hækkerup and is the father of Hans Hækkerup and Klaus Hækkerup.
