= Venstres Ungdom =

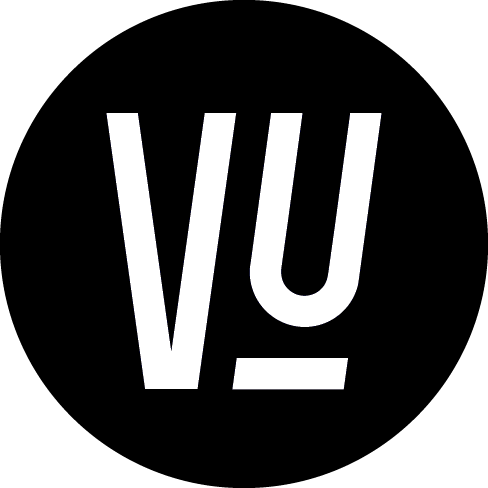
- Chairman: Lasse B. Sørensen
- Founded: 1908
- Headquarters: Nørre Voldgade 82, 4. 1358 København K
- Membership: 1755 (According to DUFs 2025-assessment)
- Ideology: Liberalism
- Mother party: Venstre
- European affiliation: European Liberal Youth (LYMEC)
- Nordic affiliation: Nordens Liberale Ungdom (NLU)
- Website: www.vu.dk

Venstres Ungdom (literally: Youth of the Left) is the youth wing of the Danish liberal Party Venstre.

== History ==
The first branch of Venstres Ungdom was founded in Kolding in 1908, and the nationwide organization was established in 1912. This makes the youth wing older than the mother party, Venstre, which was established in its current form in 1910.

When Venstres Ungdom was founded, Denmark had a bicameral parliament, and suffrage to one of the houses (Landstinget) was reserved for men no younger than 35. Consequently, Venstres Ungdom was intended as an organization for Liberals younger than 35. When turning 35, a member became entitled to transfer his membership to the "real" political party Venstre. When Landstinget was abolished in 1953 this distinction became irrelevant, and members are now free to choose if they wish to belong to Venstres Ungdom, Venstre or both organizations. Most members transfer their membership from Venstres Ungdom to Venstre when they approach the age of 30.

== Venstres Ungdom today ==
Venstres Ungdom is one of the largest political youth organization in Denmark. As of 31 December 2009, it had 1,730 members. Members play a major role in the election campaigns of Venstre. Other activities include organizing seminars and debates. The nationwide organization has a committee corresponding to each cabinet department headed by a Venstre politician. These committees hold regular meetings with the relevant cabinet ministers. A VU spokesman is elected to represent the organization for each major area. As of January 2006, the number of spokesmen is fourteen.

== Current leaders of Venstres Ungdom ==
- Chairman: Lasse B. Sørensen
- Deputy Chairman: Martin Dommerby

The Chairman and Deputy Chairman are elected by the annual National Congress (Landsstævnet) along with seven other members to the Executive Committee. The Treasurer is appointed by the National Board ("Landsstyrelsen"), amongst the members of the Executive Committee.

== Leaders ==
- 1912-1915 Niels Elgaard
- 1915-1917 A. L. H. Elmquist
- 1917-1918 J. Chr. Jensen-Broby
- 1918-1919 H. Tranberg-Jensen
- 1919-1920 Jens Rahbek
- 1920-1922 H. C. Koefoed
- 1922-1923 Søren Peter Larsen
- 1923-1923 Chr. Christensen
- 1923-1927 Henry Gideon
- 1927-1929 Edv. Sørensen
- 1929-1930 P.C. Jacobsen
- 1930-1932 Erik Eriksen
- 1932-1935 M. Elmertoft
- 1935–1937 N.K. Larsen
- 1937-1939 P. Thisted Knudsen
- 1939-1941 J. Chr. Christensen
- 1941-1943 Alfred Larsen
- 1943-1946 Søren Andersen
- 1946-1948 Jens P. Petersen
- 1948-1951 Henry Christensen
- 1951-1953 P. Givskov Christensen
- 1953-1955 Søren Jensen
- 1955-1957 Niels Westerby
- 1957-1959 Niels Anker Kofoed
- 1959-1962 Knud Enggaard
- 1962-1964 Knud Erik Særkjær
- 1964-1966 Peter Holst
- 1966-1968 Jørgen Brøndlund Nielsen
- 1968-1970 Erik Fabrin
- 1970-1972 Bertil Toft Hansen
- 1972-1974 Knud Andersen
- 1974-1976 Anders Fogh Rasmussen
- 1976-1978 Niels Jørgen Hansen
- 1978-1980 Troels Brøndsted
- 1980-1983 Flemming Oppfeldt
- 1983-1985 Jens Skipper Rasmussen
- 1985-1986 Lars Møller Sørensen
- 1986-1989 Lars Løkke Rasmussen
- 1989-1990 Jesper Ib
- 1990-1991 Lars Bech Pedersen
- 1991-1993 Hans Kargaard Thomsen
- 1993-1995 Carl Holst
- 1995-1997 Kristian Jensen
- 1997-1999 Troels Lund Poulsen
- 1999-2001 Peter Christensen
- 2001-2003 Torsten Schack Pedersen
- 2003-2005 Claus Horsted
- 2005-2007 Karsten Lauritzen
- 2007-2009 Thomas Banke
- 2009-2011 Jakob Engel-Schmidt
- 2011-2013 Morten Dahlin
- 2013-2015 Jens Husted
- 2015-2017 Chris Holst Preuss
- 2017-2019 Jakob Sabroe
- 2019-2021 Kristian Lausten
- 2021-2023 Maria Ladegaard
- 2023- Lasse B. Sørensen

== Organization ==
Important characteristics of Venstres Ungdom include

- Decisions made by Venstre are not binding for Venstres Ungdom (and vice versa).
- Venstres Ungdom is, legally speaking, completely independent and not a mere branch of Venstre.
- The national organization has no control or ownership over its local branches. The most important part of the organization is the local branches. Each branch is represented by one representative in the National Board (Landsstyrelsen). The remaining nine members, including both Chairman and Deputy Chairman, are elected by the annual National Congress. It is an important aspect of VU ideology, that the national organization is organized bottom-up. All offices are elected with a term of office of one year.

The combination of these characteristics makes Venstres Ungdom unique among the Danish political youth organizations.

The organization of the more recent Youth of the Socialist Peoples Party and Socialist Youth Front shows some similarities to the VU organization.

== Prominent (former) members of Venstres Ungdom ==
- Lars Løkke Rasmussen (Chairman 1986–1988). Interior Minister and Health Minister from 2001 to 2007. Minister of Finance from 2007 to 2009. Prime Minister of Denmark since 2009
- Anders Fogh Rasmussen (Chairman 1974–1976). Prime Minister of Denmark 2001—2009.
- Aage L.H. Elmquist (Chairman 1915–1917, VU's second Chairman and first Deputy Chairman). Justice Minister from 1945 to 1947.
- Kresten Philipsen (Deputy Chairman 1970). County Mayor of South Jutland County from 1982 to 2000.
- Carl Holst (Chairman 1993–1995). First Chairman of Region of Southern Denmark (2007-). He served as County Mayor of South Jutland County 2000–2006.
- Kristian Jensen (Chairman 1995–1997). Member of Parliament since 2001. Tax Minister since 2004.
- Troels Lund Poulsen (Chairman 1997–1999). Member of Parliament since 2001. Spokesman on foreign policy 2001–2006. As of 2006, political affairs spokesman for Venstre.
- Peter Christensen (Chairman 1999–2001). Member of Parliament since 2001. Spokesman on finances for Venstre.
- Torsten Schack Pedersen (Chairman 2001–2003). Member of Parliament since 2005. Spokesman on science for Venstre.
- Claus Horsted (Chairman 2003–2005).
- Karsten Lauritzen (Chairman 2005–2007). Currently standing for Parliament in Hjørring constituency.
- Ellen Trane Nørby (former member of the National Board). Member of Parliament since 2005. Spokeswoman on culture for Venstre.
- Bo Libergren (Treasurer 1990-1992 and 1993–1995). Member of the Regional Council of Region of Southern Denmark (2007-) (acting chairman 2023). Chairman of the Prevention and Health Committee in Funen County (2002–2006).
- Lars Christian Lilleholt (Deputy Chairman 1985–1987). Member of Parliament since 2001. Spokesman on energy and relations with Greenland for Venstre.

== Trivia ==
A traditional way of recognizing a resigning member's work for the organisation is by electing the person in question to the office of second deputy auditor (Danish: anden revisorsuppleant). This election takes place on all levels of the organization as part of the annual general meeting, along with the more serious elections of two auditors and a (first) deputy auditor. Unlike the first three mentioned, the second deputy auditor is a purely honorary title.

This tradition dates from the founding of the first VU branch in Kolding in 1908, when the newly elected second deputy auditor was informed by his high school principal that if he did not relinquish this new office immediately, he would be expelled from his school since it would be futile to attempt combining academic pursuits with a political career. Since the student's office carried virtually no obligations, VU history records this as the first clear case of harassment against the organization. Since then the unfortunate student's title has been used for honorary purposes.

== Literature ==
- Holst, Carl (1996), Drevet af ideen - historier om Venstres Ungdom. Copenhagen : Breidablik.
- Madsen, Jens Løgstrup (1983), Den moderne liberalisme - rødder og perspektiver. Copenhagen : Breidablik.
