= Troels Lund Poulsen =

Danish politician (born 1976)

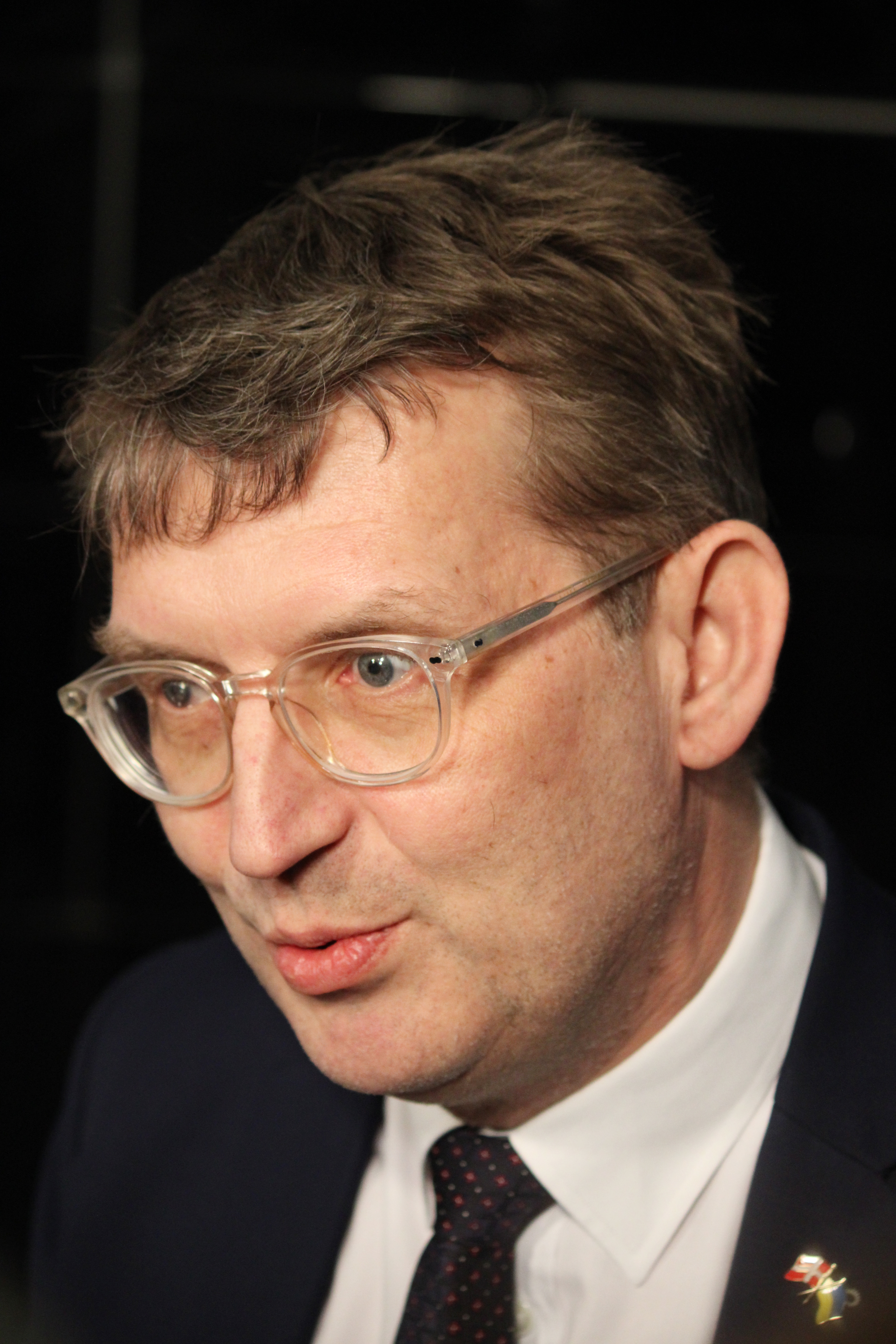
- Lund Poulsen in 2026

Deputy Prime Minister of Denmark
- In office 23 October 2023 – 3 June 2026
- Prime Minister: Mette Frederiksen
- Preceded by: Jakob Ellemann-Jensen
- Succeeded by: Office abolished

Leader of Venstre
- Incumbent
- Assumed office 18 November 2023
- Deputy: Stephanie Lose
- Preceded by: Jakob Ellemann-Jensen
Ministerial positions
Minister for Defence
In office 22 August 2023 – 3 June 2026
Prime Minister	Mette Frederiksen
Preceded by	Jakob Ellemann-Jensen
Succeeded by	Jeppe Bruus Christensen
Acting; 6 February 2023 – 1 August 2023
Preceded by	Jakob Ellemann-Jensen
Succeeded by	Jakob Ellemann-Jensen
Minister for Economic Affairs
In office 23 October 2023 – 23 November 2023
Prime Minister	Mette Frederiksen
Preceded by	Jakob Ellemann-Jensen
Succeeded by	Stephanie Lose
In office 15 December 2022 – 22 August 2023 (Note: On leave: 6 February 2023 – 1 August 2023)
Prime Minister	Mette Frederiksen
Preceded by	Simon Emil Ammitzbøll-Bille (2019)
Succeeded by	Jakob Ellemann-Jensen
Minister for Employment
In office 28 November 2016 – 27 June 2019
Prime Minister	Lars Løkke Rasmussen
Preceded by	Jørn Neergaard Larsen
Succeeded by	Peter Hummelgaard
Minister for Business Affairs and Growth
In office 28 June 2015 – 28 November 2016
Prime Minister	Lars Løkke Rasmussen
Preceded by	Henrik Sass Larsen
Succeeded by	Brian Mikkelsen
Minister of Education
In office 8 March 2011 – 3 October 2011
Prime Minister	Lars Løkke Rasmussen
Preceded by	Tina Nedergaard
Succeeded by	Christine Antorini
Minister for Taxation
In office 23 February 2010 – 8 March 2011
Prime Minister	Lars Løkke Rasmussen
Preceded by	Kristian Jensen
Succeeded by	Peter Christensen
Minister for the Environment
In office 23 November 2007 – 23 February 2010
Prime Minister	Anders Fogh Rasmussen; Lars Løkke Rasmussen
Preceded by	Connie Hedegaard
Succeeded by	Karen Ellemann

Member of the Folketing
- Incumbent
- Assumed office 20 November 2001
- Constituency: Vejle (2001–2007); East Jutland (2007–present)

Personal details
- Born: 30 March 1976 (age 50) Vejle, Denmark
- Party: Venstre
- Spouse: Anne Simonsen
- Children: 1

Troels Lund Poulsen (born 30 March 1976) is a Danish politician who has served as leader of Venstre since November 2023. He has been a member of the Folketing since 2001 and has held several ministerial offices in Danish governments.

In November 2007 he joined the Rasmussen III Cabinet, as Minister for the Environment and later served as Minister for Taxation from 2010 to 2011, Minister of Education in 2011, Minister of Commerce, Business and Growth from 2015 to 2016, and Minister for Employment from 2016 to 2019.

He rejoined government in December 2022, serving in the Frederiksen II Cabinet. He was initially appointed Minister for Economic Affairs and later became Minister of Defence in August 2023. Poulsen additionally assumed the role of Deputy Prime Minister in October 2023 and left in June 2026.

== Early life ==
Poulsen was born on 30 March 1976 in Vejle, as an only child to Aage Poulsen, a teacher, and Lise Poulsen. He grew up on a farm in Lindved and attended Lindved School from 1982 to 1992, later graduating from Tørring gymnasium in 1995.

In 1996, Poulsen began studying history at the University of Copenhagen. He remained enrolled until 2001, when he was elected to the Folketing and subsequently gave up on his studies.

== Political career ==
Poulsen joined Venstre's youth wing, Venstres Ungdom (VU), in 1992. He served as chairman of the VU branch in Tørring-Uldum from 1993 to 1994, and the national chairman of VU from 1997 to 1999.

He was first elected to the Folketing in the 2001 Danish general election, representing the Juelsminde constituency, later renamed the Hedensted. He was re-elected in 2005 and subsequent elections.

From 2001 to 2006, Poulsen served as Venstre's spokesperson on foreign affairs and gender equality. In September 2006, he became the party's political spokesperson.

In November 2007 he joined the Rasmussen III Cabinet, as Minister for the Environment. In February 2010, he became Minister for Taxation. His tenure was marked by a major political controversy in 2011 involving leaked tax information concerning Stephen Kinnock, the husband of opposition leader Helle Thorning-Schmidt. Although Poulsen denied involvement in any leak or political interference, the case led to a formal inquiry. A later commission found no evidence that he had ordered the leak or attempted to influence the tax authorities, but criticised his handling of the matter, resulting in a parliamentary reprimand.

On 8 March 2011, he was appointed Minister of Education, following Tina Nedergaard's resignation on the same day.

On 28 June 2015, he was appointed Minister of Business and Growth in the government of Lars Løkke Rasmussen II. On 28 November 2016, he was moved from here to the position of Minister of Employment.

He was appointed minister of economic affairs on 15 December 2022 when Mette Frederiksen presented her second cabinet. On 6 February 2023, he became acting minister of defence while Jakob Ellemann-Jensen was on leave. On 22 August 2023, the appointment became permanent. On 23 October 2023, he replaced Ellemann-Jensen as Deputy Prime Minister after his resignation as party leader of Venstre. He was elected leader of Venstre on 18 November 2023, with Stephanie Lose taking over as minister of economic affairs.

On 9 February 2024, he stated, "Denmark should speed up its military investments after new intelligence indicates that Russia is rearming faster than expected and that it could attack a NATO country within three to five years".

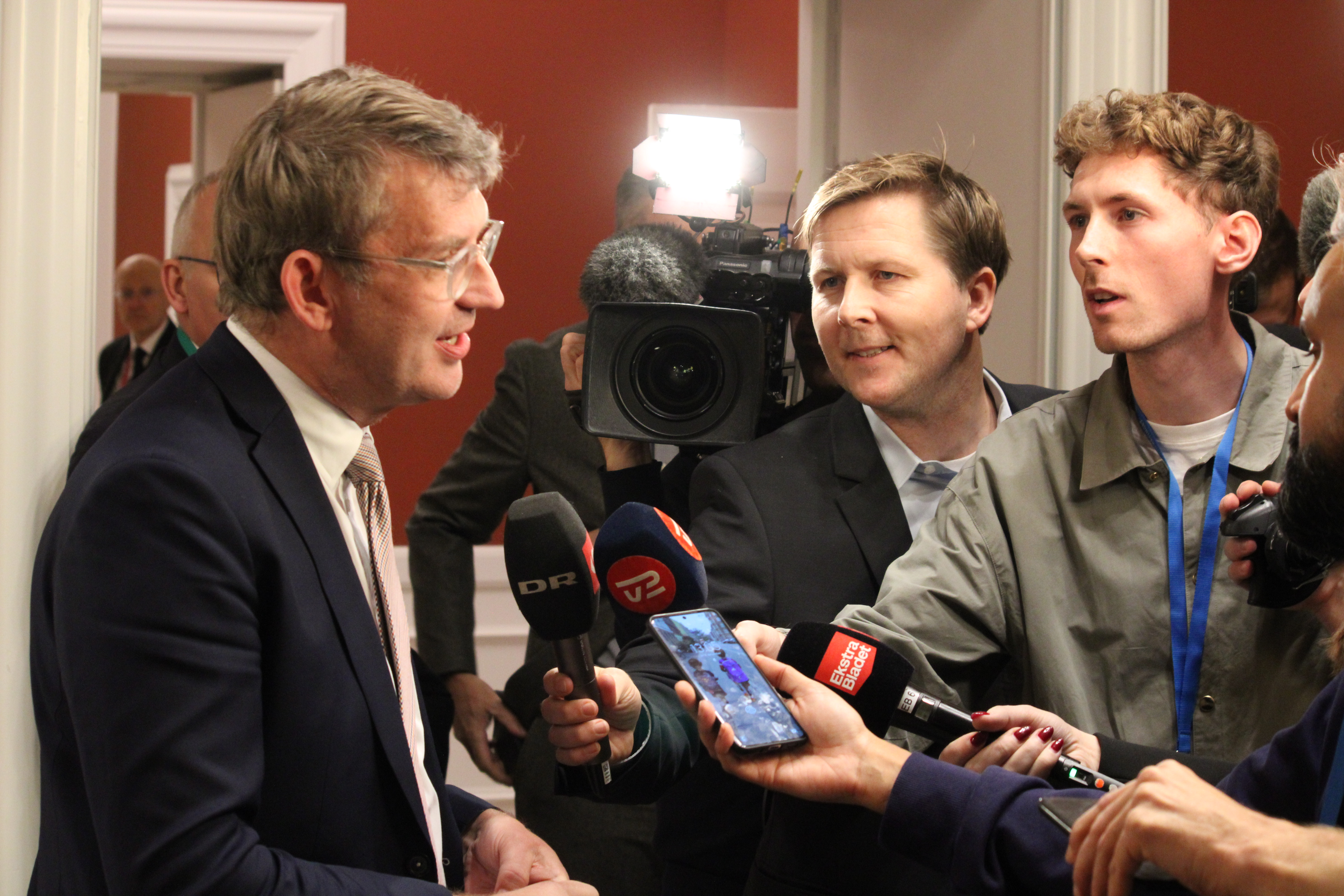
Troels Lund Poulsen taking questions from journalists at Christiansborg Palace in December 2025

On 3 April 2024, he fired Chief of Defence Flemming Lentfer, saying that Lentfer had failed to keep him informed about weapons failures on board HDMS Iver Huitfeldt when it fought in Operation Prosperity Guardian during armed combat against Houthi militants.

In 2025, the Auditor general criticised him, and previous ministers, for inadequate security at 18 military bases.

== Personal life ==
Lund Poulsen was in a relationship with fellow Venstre politician Sophie Løhde from 2007 to 2013. He is married to Anne Simonsen, a former secretary at the Ministry of Taxation. The couple have a daughter, born in 2018, and live on a farm at Birkehøjgaard near Tølløse.

== Bibliography ==
- Atlantiske afstande (2004, co-author)
- Den forandrede verden (2003, co-author)
- Tid til forandring (2001)

== Honours ==
=== National honours ===
- Commander 1st Class of the Order of the Dannebrog (2024)

=== Foreign Honours ===
- Finland: Grand Cross of the Order of the Lion of Finland (2025)
- Iceland: Grand Cross of the Order of the Falcon (2024)
- Latvia: Grand Cross of the Cross of Recognition (2025)
- Sweden: Commander Grand Cross of the Royal Order of the Polar Star (2024)
- Ukraine: 1st Class of the Order of Merit (2023)

== Notes ==
Political offices
Preceded by Connie Hedegaard	Minister for the Environment; 2007–2010	Succeeded by Karen Ellemann
Preceded by Kristian Jensen	Minister for Taxation; 2010–2011	Succeeded by Peter Christensen
Preceded by Tina Nedergaard	Minister for Education; 2011	Succeeded by Christine Antorini
Preceded by Henrik Sass Larsen	Minister for Commerce, Business and Growth; 2015–2016	Succeeded by Brian Mikkelsen
Preceded by Jørn Neergaard Larsen	Minister for Employment; 2016–2019	Succeeded by Peter Hummelgaard
Preceded by Simon Emil Ammitzbøll-Bille (2019)	Minister for Economic Affairs; 2022–2023	Succeeded by Stephanie Lose
Preceded by Jakob Ellemann-Jensen	Deputy Prime Minister of Denmark; 2023-present	Succeeded by Incumbent
