= 2025 Fanø municipal election =

Municipal election in Denmark

- 18 November 2025

All 11 seats to the Fanø municipal council 6 seats needed for a majority
- Turnout: 2,387 (85.7%) ▲3.3%
	First party	Second party	Third party
	B	C	V
Party	Social Liberals	Conservatives	Venstre
Last election	4 seats, 28.9%	3 seats, 21.6%	2 seats, 18.6%
Seats won	5	3	1
Seat change	▲1	0	▼1
Popular vote	997	555	186
Percentage	42.5%	23.7%	7.9%
Swing	▲13.6%	▲2.1%	▼10.7%
	Fourth party	Fifth party	Sixth party
	Ø	Å	A
Party	Red-Green Alliance	The Alternative	Social Democrats
Last election	1 seat, 8.7%	0 seats, 3.4%	1 seat, 8.3%
Seats won	1	1	0
Seat change	0	▲1	▼1
Popular vote	182	142	106
Percentage	7.8%	6.1%	4.5%
Swing	▼1.0%	▲2.6%	▼3.7%
Mayor before election
Frank Jensen
Social Liberals
Mayor after election
Frank Jensen
Social Liberals

The 2025 Fanø Municipal election was held on November 18, 2025, in the Danish municipality of Fanø, to elect the 11 members to sit in the regional council for the Fanø Municipal council, in the period of 2026 to 2029. Frank Jensen from the Social Liberals, would secure re-election.

== Background ==
Following the 2021 election, Frank Jensen from the Social Liberals became mayor for his first term.

== Electoral system ==
For elections to Danish municipalities, a number varying from 9 to 31 are chosen to be elected to the municipal council. The seats are then allocated using the D'Hondt method and a closed list proportional representation. Fanø Municipality had 11 seats in 2025.

== Electoral alliances ==
=== Electoral Alliance 1 ===
Party		Political alignment
A	Social Democrats	Centre-left
F	Green Left	Centre-left to Left-wing
Å	The Alternative	Centre-left to Left-wing

=== Electoral Alliance 2 ===
Party		Political alignment
B	Social Liberals	Centre to Centre-left
L	Fanø Borgerliste	Local politics
Ø	Red-Green Alliance	Left-wing to Far-Left

== Results by polling station ==
Division	A	B	C	F	L	V	Ø	Å
Division	%	%	%	%	%	%	%	%
Nordby (Fanø Hallen)	4.5	45.2	22.1	3.5	3.6	8.1	7.6	5.4
Sønderho	4.5	19.2	37.1	9.0	2.9	6.5	9.4	11.4

== Results ==
Party		Votes	%	+/-	Seats	+/-
Fanø Municipality
B	Social Liberals	997	42.52	+13.57	5	+1
C	Conservatives	555	23.67	+2.11	3	0
V	Venstre	186	7.93	-10.67	1	-1
Ø	Red-Green Alliance	182	7.76	-0.97	1	0
Å	The Alternative	142	6.06	+2.62	1	+1
A	Social Democrats	106	4.52	-3.74	0	-1
F	Green Left	95	4.05	-2.38	0	0
L	Fanø Borgerliste	82	3.50	New	0	New
Total		2,345	100	N/A	11	N/A
Invalid votes		7	0.25	-0.14		
Blank votes		35	1.26	+0.15		
Turnout		2,387	85.71	+3.30		
Source: valg.dk

== Opinion polls ==
Polling firm	Fieldwork date	Sample size	B	C	V	Ø	A	F	Å	L	Others	Lead
Fanø Skole	13 Nov 2025	233	43.8 (6)	17.2 (2)	6.9 (0)	9.9 (1)	9.4 (1/2)	4.7 (0/1)	4.3 (0)	3.9 (0)	–	26.6
Epinion	4 Sep - 13 Oct 2025	96	38.0	16.2	6.1	8.7	9.8	14.3	5.9	–	1.0	21.8
2024 european parliament election	9 Jun 2024		8.2	7.1	14.5	7.3	18.8	19.0	2.9	–	–	0.2
2022 general election	1 Nov 2022		3.4	7.8	8.7	6.7	29.6	9.3	5.2	–	–	20.3
2021 regional election	16 Nov 2021		10.4	7.3	39.9	9.0	17.1	7.7	1.6	–	–	22.8
2021 municipal election	16 Nov 2021		28.9 (4)	21.6 (3)	18.6 (2)	8.7 (1)	8.3 (1)	6.4 (0)	3.4 (0)	–	–	7.3
