= 2021 Southern Denmark Regional election =

- 16 November 2021

All 41 seats to the Southern Denmark regional Council 21 seats needed for a majority
- Turnout: 664,282 (67.7%) ▼4.5pp
	First party	Second party	Third party
	V	A	C
Party	Venstre	Social Democrats	Conservatives
Last election	14 seats, 32.4%	10 seats, 23.3%	2 seats, 4.5%
Seats won	17	12	3
Seat change	▲3	▲2	▲1
Popular vote	249,004	164,481	48,870
Percentage	39.2%	25.9%	7.7%
Swing	▲6.8%	▲2.6%	▲3.2%
	Fourth party	Fifth party	Sixth party
	F	D	Ø
Party	Green Left	New Right	Red–Green Alliance
Last election	6 seats, 13.6%	0 seats, 1.2%	2 seats, 4.1%
Seats won	2	2	2
Seat change	▼4	▲2	0
Popular vote	40,878	29,517	27,322
Percentage	6.4%	4.6%	4.3%
Swing	▼7.2%	▲3.4%	▲0.2%
	Seventh party	Eighth party	Ninth party
	B	O	I
Party	Social Liberals	Danish People's Party	Liberal Alliance
Last election	1 seat, 3.6%	5 seats, 10.9%	1 seat, 2.6%
Seats won	2	1	0
Seat change	▲1	▼4	▼1
Popular vote	26,783	27,220	6,013
Percentage	4.2%	4.3%	1.0%
Swing	▲0.6%	▼6.6%	▼1.6%
Chairperson before election
Stephanie Lose
Venstre
Chairperson after election
Stephanie Lose
Venstre

The 2021 Southern Denmark regional election was held on November 16, 2021, to elect the 41 members to sit in the regional council for the Central Denmark Region, in the period of 2022 to 2025.

The four previous elections held in the region had all resulted in Venstre winning the chairperson position, being the only region where the party always had held that position. Following the 2017 election, Stephanie Lose would have her first full term as the chairperson. . (Note: Lose took over from Carl Holst in June 2015)

In this election, Venstre got their best result to date in the region, winning 39.2% of the vote. This result was unlike most elections in the 2021 Danish local elections, where Venstre decreased their vote share. Stephanie Lose ended up with a record-high 147,486 personal votes. This number was equal to 23.2% of all votes cast, and was the highest number of personal votes ever received in a Danish regional election.

It was later announced that Stephanie Lose would continue as chairperson of the Region.

== Electoral Alliances ==
Electoral Alliance 1

Party		Political Position
G	Vegan Party	Centre-left to Left-wing
Ø	Red–Green Alliance	Left-wing to Far-left
Å	The Alternative	Centre-left to Left-wing

Electoral Alliance 2

Party		Political Position
A	Social Democrats	Centre-left
F	Green Left	Centre-left to Left-wing

Electoral Alliance 3

Party		Political Position
B	Social Liberals	Centre to Centre-left
C	Conservatives	Centre-right

Electoral Alliance 4

Party		Political Position
D	New Right	Right-wing
H	Liberal Borgerliste	Local Politics
O	Danish People's Party	Right-wing
V	Venstre	Centre-right

Electoral Alliance 5

Party		Political Position
I	Liberal Alliance	Centre-right to Right-wing
K	Christian Democrats	Centre to Centre-right
M	Vi Lokale Demokrater	Local Politics

== Results by constituencies and municipalities ==
This is a list of results of the following parties
A = Social Democrats
B = Social Liberals
C = Conservatives
D = New Right
F = Green Left
G = Vegan Party
H = Liberal Borgerliste
I = Liberal Alliance
K = Christian Democrats
L = Danmark Først
M = Vi Lokale Demokrater
O = Danish People's Party
P = Stram Kurs
V = Venstre
Z = De LokalNationale
Æ = Freedom List
Ø = Red–Green Alliance
Å = The Alternative

=== Constituencies ===
Division	A	B	C	D	F	G	H	I	K	L	M	O	P	V	Z	Æ	Ø	Å
Division	%	%	%	%	%	%	%	%	%	%	%	%	%	%	%	%	%	%
South Jutland	25.1	3.1	6.7	5.2	5.2	0.2	0.2	0.9	1.2	0.1	0.0	4.6	0.1	43.8	0.0	0.2	3.0	0.4
Funen	27.0	5.8	9.0	3.9	8.2	0.4	0.1	1.0	0.6	0.1	0.1	3.9	0.1	32.9	0.1	0.3	6.2	0.5

=== Municipalities ===
Division	A	B	C	D	F	G	H	I	K	L	M	O	P	V	Z	Æ	Ø	Å
Division	%	%	%	%	%	%	%	%	%	%	%	%	%	%	%	%	%	%
Sønderborg	33.3	2.2	3.5	5.8	3.3	0.3	0.1	0.7	0.5	0.1	0.0	3.9	0.1	42.7	0.0	0.3	2.8	0.3
Aabenraa	23.8	1.9	6.2	7.4	4.2	0.2	0.1	0.8	1.4	0.1	0.0	4.7	0.2	46.0	0.1	0.2	2.5	0.5
Tønder	17.5	1.5	4.0	5.7	4.9	0.2	0.1	0.7	1.7	0.1	0.0	4.3	0.2	56.3	0.0	0.2	2.3	0.4
Esbjerg	25.2	3.4	6.0	4.9	6.2	0.2	0.1	0.7	0.7	0.0	0.0	3.4	0.1	45.2	0.0	0.3	3.2	0.2
Fanø	17.1	10.4	7.3	2.9	7.7	0.2	0.0	0.8	0.7	0.0	0.1	1.9	0.0	39.9	0.0	0.4	9.0	1.6
Varde	21.1	2.3	7.8	5.3	3.0	0.2	0.1	0.8	1.9	0.1	0.0	4.0	0.1	51.6	0.1	0.1	1.6	0.2
Vejen	20.7	1.9	9.7	5.4	4.2	0.2	1.6	0.7	0.9	0.1	0.0	4.1	0.1	47.7	0.1	0.3	2.2	0.2
Billund	28.7	2.0	8.2	3.7	1.8	0.2	0.1	0.7	1.4	0.1	0.0	5.2	0.1	46.4	0.0	0.1	1.1	0.2
Vejle	26.2	3.9	8.3	4.6	5.9	0.3	0.1	1.5	1.4	0.1	0.0	4.8	0.1	39.2	0.0	0.2	2.9	0.6
Fredericia	33.2	2.5	6.5	6.2	5.2	0.2	0.1	0.8	0.8	0.0	0.0	5.3	0.1	33.4	0.0	0.4	4.5	0.6
Kolding	20.5	5.3	7.9	3.8	8.7	0.2	0.2	1.4	1.2	0.0	0.0	5.6	0.1	41.3	0.0	0.2	3.4	0.3
Haderslev	24.8	3.1	6.1	5.6	4.2	0.2	0.1	0.6	1.7	0.0	0.0	5.6	0.1	43.0	0.0	0.2	4.2	0.5
Odense	26.8	8.5	11.2	3.4	8.7	0.5	0.1	1.2	0.7	0.0	0.0	2.8	0.1	27.7	0.1	0.3	7.1	0.6
Assens	27.4	3.0	6.1	4.7	6.4	0.3	0.1	0.5	0.6	0.1	0.1	4.8	0.1	40.5	0.1	0.5	3.9	0.8
Middelfart	27.5	4.2	7.9	4.6	7.1	0.3	0.1	1.0	0.5	0.0	0.0	5.0	0.1	36.8	0.0	0.2	4.2	0.3
Nordfyn	29.8	3.2	4.7	4.3	5.6	0.2	0.1	0.6	0.4	0.1	0.0	5.1	0.2	42.3	0.1	0.3	2.6	0.3
Nyborg	27.6	3.3	4.5	3.6	7.3	0.3	0.0	0.8	0.4	0.0	0.7	3.6	0.1	42.7	0.0	0.2	4.4	0.3
Kerteminde	28.5	2.9	20.1	4.4	6.4	0.3	0.1	0.7	1.4	0.1	0.1	4.1	0.2	25.8	0.1	0.1	4.6	0.2
Svendborg	28.1	5.0	6.7	3.5	10.4	0.3	0.1	1.1	0.4	0.0	0.2	3.4	0.1	29.2	0.0	0.3	10.4	0.8
Langeland	18.4	3.6	5.0	4.3	13.8	0.4	0.1	0.3	0.4	0.1	0.1	3.6	0.1	44.8	0.1	0.2	4.4	0.4
Faaborg-Midtfyn	27.2	4.9	7.3	4.5	7.3	0.3	0.1	0.7	0.6	0.1	0.1	6.3	0.1	34.4	0.2	0.3	5.3	0.5
Ærø	13.0	4.8	14.1	2.6	6.2	0.3	0.0	0.3	0.3	0.1	0.1	3.1	0.2	46.6	0.0	0.7	6.9	0.8

== Results ==
Party		Votes	%	+/-	Seats	+/-
Southern Denmark Region
V	Venstre	249,004	39.21	+6.85	17	+3
A	Social Democrats	164,481	25.90	+2.55	12	+2
C	Conservatives	48,870	7.70	+3.19	3	+1
F	Green Left	40,878	6.44	-7.19	2	-4
D	New Right	29,517	4.65	+3.46	2	+2
Ø	Red-Green Alliance	27,322	4.30	+0.22	2	0
O	Danish People's Party	27,220	4.29	-6.62	1	-4
B	Social Liberals	26,783	4.22	+0.61	2	+1
I	Liberal Alliance	6,013	0.95	-1.63	0	-1
K	Christian Democrats	5,991	0.94	+0.22	0	0
Å	The Alternative	2,826	0.45	-1.32	0	0
G	Vegan Party	1,796	0.28	New	0	New
Æ	Freedom List	1,580	0.25	New	0	New
H	Liberal Borgerliste	860	0.14	New	0	New
P	Stram Kurs	707	0.11	New	0	New
Z	De LokalNationale	399	0.06	New	0	New
M	Vi Lokale Demokrater	372	0.06	New	0	New
L	Danmark Først	359	0.06	-0.02	0	0
Total		634,978	100	N/A	41	N/A
Invalid votes		2,782	0.28	0.0		
Blank votes		26,522	2.70	-0.30		
Turnout		664,282	67.71	-4.48		
Source: valg.dk
