= Forward (Denmark) =

Forward Fremad
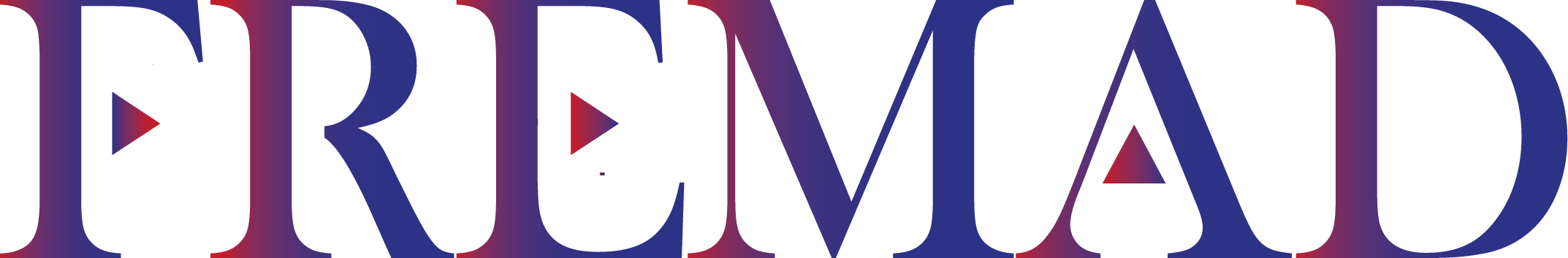
- Leader: Simon Emil Ammitzbøll-Bille
- Founded: 7 November 2019
- Dissolved: 8 October 2020
- Split from: Liberal Alliance
- Ideology: Liberalism; Classical liberalism Pro-Europeanism
- Political position: Centre-right

Website
- partietfremad.dk

Forward (Danish: Fremad) was a Danish political party founded in November 2019 by Simon Emil Ammitzbøll-Bille and Christina Egelund, after they in October left the Liberal Alliance. Ammitzbøll-Bille was chairman and Egelund vice chairman and political spokesperson. Both had been leading figures in Liberal Alliance prior to the June election, that saw Egelund losing her seat in the Folketing, while Ammitzbøll-Bille was reelected.

Forward characterized itself as a centrist party based on liberal values, and saw itself as the centre-right version of the Danish Social Liberal Party. The party was pro-EU, and advocated for the abolition of two of the Danish opt-outs. They supported Jakob Ellemann-Jensen, chairman of Venstre, as prime minister. Their name was inspired by the French La République En Marche!.

On 8 October 2020, Simon Emil Amitzbøll-Bille and Christina Egelund announced that Forward was disbanded.
