= Borgerligt Centrum =

- Leader: Jeppe Søe
- Founded: January 6, 2009
- Dissolved: November 2011
- Headquarters: PO box 32; 1002 København K
- Ideology: Liberalism; Humanism; Centrism

Website
- http://www.borgerligtcentrum.dk/

Borgerligt Centrum ("Civil Centre") was a Danish political party founded on 6 January 2009, by MP Simon Emil Ammitzbøll, a former member of the Social Liberal Party. The party describes itself as a "centre right party founded on liberal and humanistic values".

On 16 June 2009, Ammitzbøll officially disbanded the party, and attempted to join the other small centre party in the Danish Parliament, Liberal Alliance. He officially declared the party dead, and the only seat they have had in parliament was thus lost. However, the party which had been created behind him defied his attempt to disband the party and elected a new leader, Jeppe Søe.

On 28 June 2009, the party threaten to sue the founder, who still had access to the member lists, the signatures (needed to run for election), the domain name, among other things.

== Politics ==
According to the party's website, the party has three key issues:

- To increase funding for healthcare and education by increasing the total number of annual working hours. It argues that the age of retirement should be raised, early retirement benefits should be abolished, and the length of time one is eligible to receive unemployment benefits should be shortened.
- Fewer prohibitions and regulations.
- More skilled immigrants should come to Denmark. The party wants to abolish the so-called "24 year rule" and the attachment requirement, thus making it easier to take up residence in Denmark. However, immigrants should only gain free access to benefits such as healthcare after a length of time and should always respect Danish values.
