= Peter Christensen (politician, born 1975) =

Danish politician (1975–2025)

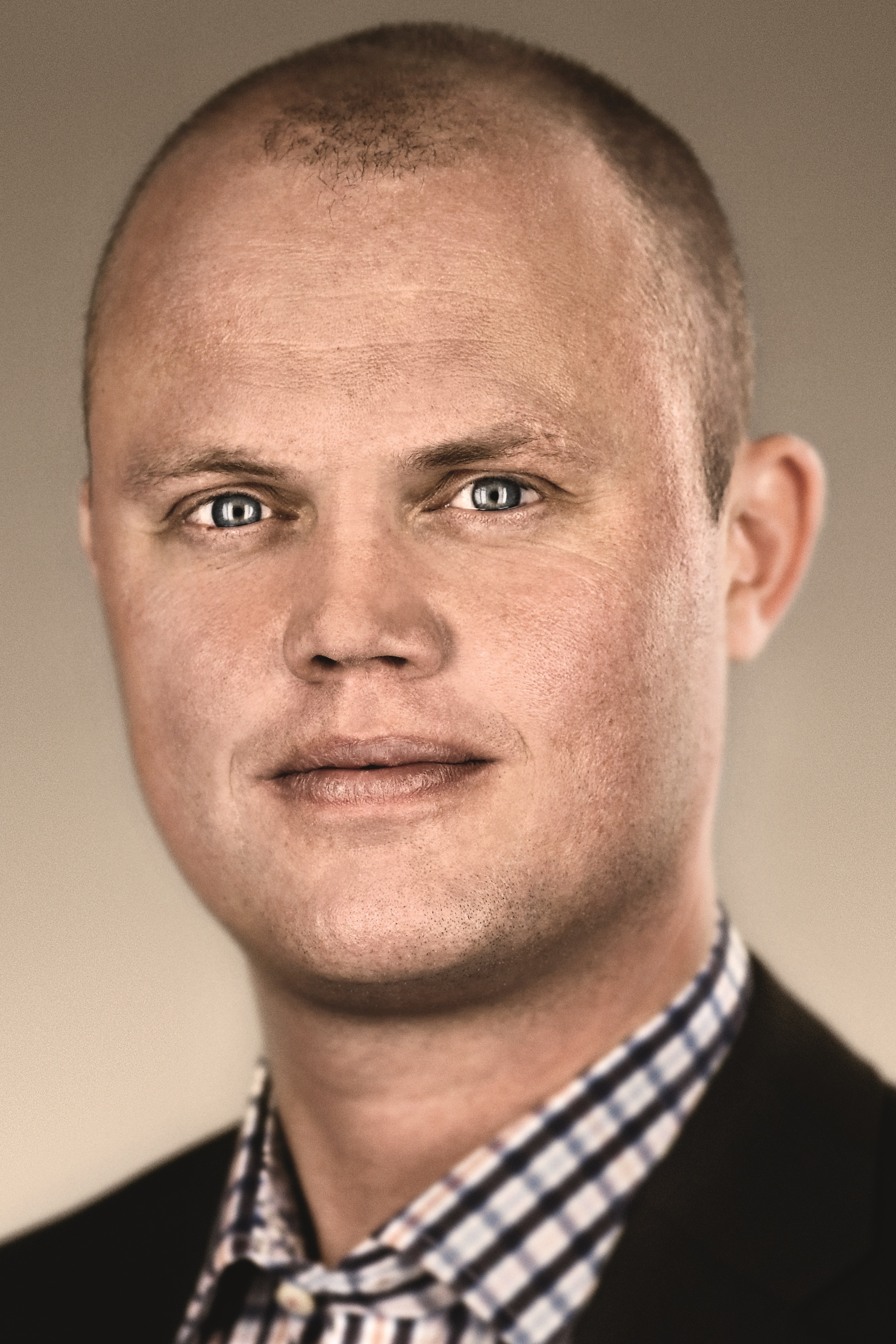

Minister of Defence
- In office 30 September 2015 – 28 November 2016
- Prime Minister: Lars Løkke Rasmussen
- Preceded by: Carl Holst
- Succeeded by: Claus Hjort Frederiksen

Minister for Nordic Cooperation
- In office 30 September 2015 – 28 November 2016
- Prime Minister: Lars Løkke Rasmussen
- Preceded by: Carl Holst
- Succeeded by: Karen Ellemann

Minister of Taxation
- In office 8 March 2011 – 3 October 2011
- Prime Minister: Lars Løkke Rasmussen
- Preceded by: Troels Lund Poulsen
- Succeeded by: Thor Möger Pedersen

Member of the Folketing
- In office 20 November 2001 – 18 June 2015
- Constituency: Sønderjyllands Amtskreds

Personal details
- Born: 25 April 1975 Sønderborg, Denmark
- Died: 6 February 2025 (aged 49)
- Party: Venstre

Peter Christensen (25 April 1975 – 6 February 2025) was a Danish politician and member of the Danish Parliament. He was briefly the Minister of Taxation in March 2011 before being replaced by Thor Möger Pedersen in October of the same year. Christensen also replaced Carl Holst as Minister of Defence in 2015.

== Career ==
He was the national chairman for Venstres Ungdom from 1999 to 2001 and served as the member of the Danish Parliament from 2001 to 2015 by being elected for the constituency of Tønder in 2001.

In the 2015 Danish general election, he was not re-elected but was appointed the Minister of Defence and Minister for Nordic Cooperation by then Prime Minister and Venstre leader, Lars Løkke Rasmussen.

After losing his parliamentary seat in the 2015 election, Christensen retired from politics. From 2017 to 2023, he worked in the private sector, including as director of the business organization Aktive Ejere (Active Owners).

== Personal life and death ==
Christensen grew up in the village of Heart, north of Rødding in Southern Jutland. Before heading into politics, he was a technician. He was motivated into politics after being diagnosed with cancer when he was 17.

Christensen married journalist Josefine Kofoed in 2010. The couple had three children.

He died on 6 February 2025 at the age of 49 due to cancer.

Political offices
Preceded by Troels Lund Poulsen	Minister of Taxation; March–October 2011	Succeeded by Thor Möger Pedersen
Preceded by Carl Holst	Minister of Defence; 2015–2016	Succeeded by Claus Hjort Frederiksen
Preceded by Carl Holst	Minister for Nordic Cooperation; 2015–2016	Succeeded by Karen Ellemann
