= Niels Helveg Petersen =

Danish politician (1939–2017)

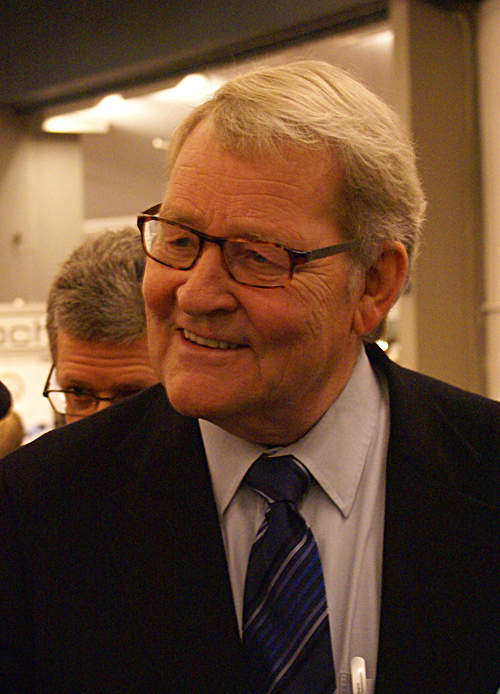
- Petersen in 2008

Minister of Foreign Affairs
- In office 25 January 1993 – 21 December 2000
- Prime Minister: Poul Nyrup Rasmussen
- Preceded by: Uffe Ellemann-Jensen
- Succeeded by: Mogens Lykketoft

Minister for Economic Affairs
- In office 3 June 1988 – 18 December 1990
- Prime Minister: Poul Schlüter
- Preceded by: Knud Enggaard
- Succeeded by: Anders Fogh Rasmussen

Leader of Danish Social Liberal Party
- In office 1978–1990
- Preceded by: Svend Haugaard
- Succeeded by: Marianne Jelved

Member of Parliament for Funen
- In office 13 November 2007 – 15 September 2011

Member of Parliament for Fyns Amtskreds
- In office 21 September 1994 – 13 November 2007

Member of Parliament for Fyns Amtskreds
- In office 15 February 1977 – 1 February 1993

Member of Parliament for Frederiksborg Amtskreds
- In office 22 November 1966 – 30 September 1974

Personal details
- Born: 17 January 1939 Odense, Denmark
- Died: 3 June 2017 (aged 78) Løkkeby, Denmark
- Cause of death: Esophageal Cancer
- Party: Social Liberal
- Spouse: Kirsten Lee (m. 1984)
- Children: 2
- Education: University of Copenhagen; Stanford University

Niels Lolk Helveg Petersen (Danish pronunciation: [ˈne̝ls ˈlʌlˀk ˈhelˌve̝ˀj ˈpʰe̝ˀtɐsn̩]; informally Niels Helveg; 17 January 1939 – 3 June 2017) was a Danish politician. He was Minister of Foreign Affairs from 1993 to 2000, having previously held the role of Minister for Economic Affairs between 1988 and 1990. He was a Member of the Folketing for the Danish Social Liberal Party from 1966 to 1974, 1977 to 1993, and again from 1994 to 2011.

== Early life ==
Niels Helveg Petersen was born in Odense in 1939. His parents were former cabinet minister Kristen Helveg Petersen and former Mayor of Copenhagen Lilly Helveg Petersen. He graduated from the University of Copenhagen in 1965, earning a cand.jur. degree. From 1961 to 1962, he spent a year as an exchange student at Stanford University studying Government. During his years in Copenhagen he was an active member of the youth branch of the Danish Social Liberal Party, editing their paper 'Liberté'.

== Political career ==
=== Member of Parliament 1966–2011 ===
Niels Helveg Petersen ran for election to the Danish Parliament for the first time in 1964. In 1966, he was elected a Member of Parliament for the first time in the Frederiksborg County. In 1974, he left Denmark to become a civil servant in the European Commission. He returned to Danish politics in 1977, this time being elected to parliament standing in the Funen constituency. He became leader of the Danish Social Liberal Party (Danish: Radikale Venstre) in 1978 and kept this role until 1990. During the 1980s, he supported the economic policies of the Conservative-Liberal government. At the same time, he supported the opposition on other questions such as security policies. In doing so, his party created majorities without the parties in government, a practice that became known as 'footnote politics'. In supporting different sides of parliament, he was sometimes referred to by the Danish media as a 'king maker', deciding which policies would pass and which would not. The Social Liberal's footnote politics ended in 1988 when the party entered the government coalition. In April 2008, Niels Helveg Petersen announced that he was not standing at the next election that took place in September 2011.

=== Minister for Economic Affairs 1988–90 ===
He was Minister for Economic Affairs in the Cabinet of Poul Schlüter III from 3 June 1988 to 18 December 1990, when his party left the government coalition after poor election results in 1990. He consequently also stepped down as party leader.

=== Minister of Foreign Affairs 1993–2000 ===
He was appointed Minister for Foreign Affairs from 25 January 1993 to 21 December 2000 in the Cabinet of Poul Nyrup Rasmussen I, II, III, and IV (except for the last part of the IV cabinet). When the European Union's Maastricht Treaty was rejected by the Danish people in 1992, it was accepted after a referendum in 1993 adding certain opt-out concessions for Denmark. As the new Minister of Foreign Affairs, Niels Helveg Petersen had to work to implement those concessions, although he had been a long supporter of greater internationalisation of Danish foreign policy. When he left the position of Foreign Minister in 2000, the official reason given was that he could no longer accept the opt-outs. He joined the newly created Council of the Baltic Sea States, which in 1993 successfully established the EuroFaculty in Tartu, Riga, and Vilnius, of which he became an active supporter.

== Personal life ==
Niels Helveg Petersen was married to Kirsten Lee, who is also a former member of the Danish Parliament for the Social Liberal Party. His son Morten Helveg Petersen was member of the parliament from 11 March 1998 and until August 2009. His son Rasmus Helveg Petersen was member of parliament 2011-2015 and again from 2019, and a cabinet minister 2013–2015. Niels Helveg Petersen died of esophageal cancer, aged 78.

== See also ==
- Thulegate

Political offices
Preceded by Svend Haugaard	Leader of the Danish Social Liberal Party; 1978—1990	Succeeded by Marianne Jelved
