= 2021 Fanø municipal election =

| ← 2017 | 16 November 2021 | 2025 → |

All 11 seats to the Fanø Municipal Council 6 seats needed for a majority
- Turnout: 2,342 (82.4%) ▼3.3pp
| | First party | Second party | Third party |
|---|---|---|---|
| | B | C | V |
| Party | Social Liberals | Conservatives | Venstre |
| Last election | Did not stand | 2 seats, 14.9% | 3 seats, 23.6% |
| Seats won | 4 | 3 | 2 |
| Seat change | ▲4 | ▲1 | ▼1 |
| Popular vote | 666 | 496 | 428 |
| Percentage | 28.9% | 21.6% | 18.6% |
| Swing | New | ▲6.7% | ▼5.0% |
| | Fourth party | Fifth party | Sixth party |
| | Ø | A | F |
| Party | Red–Green Alliance | Social Democrats | Green Left |
| Last election | Did not stand | 1 seats, 11,9% | 1 seat, 8.9% |
| Seats won | 1 | 1 | 0 |
| Seat change | ▲1 | 0 | ▼1 |
| Popular vote | 201 | 190 | 148 |
| Percentage | 8.7% | 8.3% | 6.4% |
| Swing | New | ▼3.6% | ▼2.5% |
| | Seventh party | Eighth party |
| | Å | L |
| Party | The Alternative | Fanø Lokaliste |
| Last election | 1 seat, 7.6% | 2 seats, 16.7% |
| Seats won | 0 | 0 |
| Seat change | ▼1 | ▼2 |
| Popular vote | 79 | 61 |
| Percentage | 3.4% | 2.7% |
| Swing | ▼4.2% | ▼14.0% |
Mayor before election
Sofie Valbjørn
The Alternative
Mayor after election
Frank Jensen
Social Liberals

Following the 2017 election, The Alternative would secure its first, and only to date, head mayor position in a Danish municipality. Sofie Valbjørn, who was the only one elected to the council from The Alternative in 2017, would become mayor, after there was support between the Social Democrats, Venstre, The Alternative and local party Miljølisten.

In January 2021, Sofie Valbjørn announced that she would not stand for re-election in protest for what she called "extremely poor cooperation" between the parties.

For this election, the Social Liberalswould stand for the first time since 2009, while the Red–Green Alliance would stand for the first time since the 2007 municipal reform. Frank Jensen from the Social Liberals, would lead the party to winning 4 of the 11 seats, which would see the party become the largest in the council. He would eventually gain support, to replace Sofie Valbjørn from The Alternative, who on the contrary, lost representation in the council.

== Electoral system ==
For elections to Danish municipalities, a number varying from 9 to 31 are chosen to be elected to the municipal council. The seats are then allocated using the D'Hondt method and a closed list proportional representation. Fanø Municipality had 11 seats in 2021

Unlike in Danish General Elections, in elections to municipal councils, electoral alliances are allowed.

== Electoral alliances ==
=== Electoral Alliance 1 ===
| Party | | Political alignment |
|---|---|---|
| A | Social Democrats | Centre-left |
| L | Fanø Lokaliste | Local politics |
| V | Venstre | Centre-right |

=== Electoral Alliance 2 ===
| Party | | Political alignment |
|---|---|---|
| C | Conservatives | Centre-right |
| O | Danish People's Party | Right-wing to Far-right |

=== Electoral Alliance 3 ===
| Party | | Political alignment |
|---|---|---|
| B | Social Liberals | Centre to Centre-left |
| Ø | Red–Green Alliance | Left-wing to Far-Left |
| Å | The Alternative | Centre-left to Left-wing |

== Results by polling station ==
| Division | A | B | C | F | L | O | V | Ø | Å |
| Division | % | % | % | % | % | % | % | % | % |
|---|---|---|---|---|---|---|---|---|---|
| Nordby | 7.3 | 30.6 | 20.6 | 6.5 | 2.9 | 1.4 | 18.8 | 8.5 | 3.4 |
| Sønderho | 15.8 | 16.6 | 28.7 | 6.0 | 0.8 | 1.1 | 17.0 | 10.6 | 3.4 |

== Results ==
| Party | | Votes | % | +/- | Seats | +/- |
Fanø Municipality
| B | Social Liberals | 666 | 28.94 | New | 4 | New |
| C | Conservatives | 496 | 21.56 | +6.67 | 3 | +1 |
| V | Venstre | 428 | 18.60 | -5.01 | 2 | -1 |
| Ø | Enhedslisten - De Rød - Grønne | 201 | 8.74 | New | 1 | New |
| A | Social Democrats | 190 | 8.26 | -3.61 | 1 | 0 |
| F | Green Left | 148 | 6.43 | -2.46 | 0 | -1 |
| Å | The Alternative | 79 | 3.43 | -4.12 | 0 | -1 |
| L | Fanø Lokalliste | 61 | 2.65 | -14.05 | 0 | -2 |
| O | Danish People's Party | 32 | 1.39 | -2.32 | 0 | 0 |
| Total | | 2,301 | 100 | N/A | 11 | N/A |
| Invalid votes | | 11 | 0.39 | +0.34 | | |
| Blank votes | | 30 | 1.06 | +0.17 | | |
| Turnout | | 2,342 | 82.41 | -3.34 | | |
Source: valg.dk
