= Carl Holst =

Danish politician

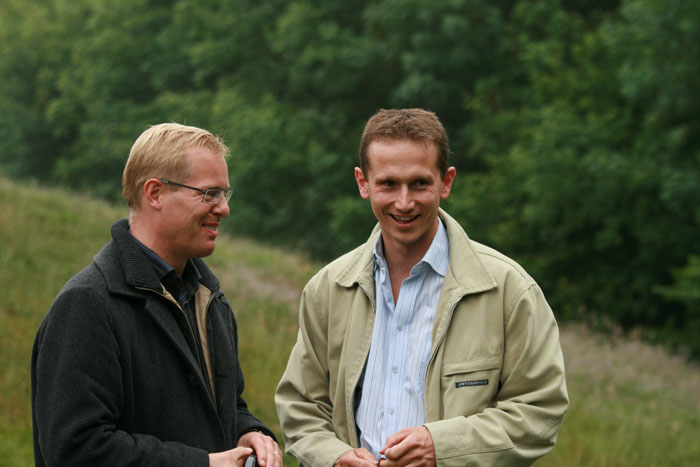
Carl Holst (left) with Kristian Jensen, Minister of Taxation, at Skamlingsbanken in 2008

Carl Holst (born 29 April 1970 in Rødding) is a Danish politician, representing the liberal party Venstre. He is the first Region Mayor of Region of Southern Denmark, an office he assumed on 1 January 2007. He served as County Mayor of South Jutland County from 1 July 2000, following the unexpected resignation of the former county mayor, Kresten Philipsen. Holst was re-elected in 2001, and served in this capacity until 31 December 2006, when the Danish counties were abolished.

In the Danish municipal elections on 15 November 2005, he was elected as the first Chairman of Region of Southern Denmark, one of the largest Regions in Denmark.

On 28 June 2015 he became Minister of Defence and Nordic Cooperation replacing Nicolai Wammen. He resigned again on 30 September 2015 due to several suspicious cases from his time as Chairman of Region of Southern Denmark.

Carl Holst is a teacher by profession. He has also served in several other capacities, including chairman of Venstres Ungdom from 1993 to 1995.

Political offices
| Preceded by Kresten Philipsen | County Mayor of South Jutland; 1 July 2000 – 31 December 2006 | Succeeded by Office abolished. South Jutland merged into Region of Southern Denmark. |
| Preceded by Office created | Chairman of Region of Southern Denmark; 1 January 2007 – 22 June 2015 | Succeeded by Stephanie Lose |
| Preceded by Nicolai Wammen | Defence Minister of Denmark; 28 June 2015 – 30 September 2015 | Succeeded by Peter Christensen |
| Preceded by Carsten Hansen | Minister for Nordic Cooperation; 28 June 2015 – 30 September 2015 | Succeeded by Peter Christensen |
