= Svend Haugaard =

Danish politician

Svend Haugaard (1913–2003), was a Danish politician and party leader. Member of Folketinget for the Social Liberal Party 1964–1979. Agronomist. Headmaster of an agricultural high school. Was part of a leftist oppositional party faction during the party leadership of Hilmar Baunsgaard. Followed the latter as party leader but achieved a poor election result in February 1977. Haugaard had a lifelong personal and organizational commitment to pacifism. In translation, his memoirs from 1989 are called No words without deeds.

Party political offices
Preceded by Hilmar Baunsgaard	Political leader of the Danish Social Liberal Party; 1975 – 1978	Succeeded by Niels Helveg Petersen
