= Tina Nedergaard =

Danish politician

Education Minister of Denmark
- In office 23 February 2010 – 8 March 2011
- Preceded by: Bertel Haarder
- Succeeded by: Troels Lund Poulsen

Member of the Folketing for North Jutland
- In office 13 November 2007 – 18 June 2015

Member of the Folketing for North Jutland County
- In office 20 November 2001 – 13 November 2007

Personal details
- Born: 28 March 1969 (age 57) Aarhus, Denmark
- Party: Liberal

Tina Nedergaard (born 28 March 1969) was the Education Minister of Denmark from 2010 to 2011. She was a member of the Folketing from 2001 to 2015 sitting for two terms.

== Early life and education ==
Tina Nedergaard was born on March 28, 1969, in Aarhus, Denmark to a family of farmers. In 1988, Nedergaard enrolled at a high school in Hobro, Denmark specializing in math and social sciences. Afterwards, she graduated with a Master of Science in political sciences from the Aarhus University in 1997.

== Career ==
After graduating in 1997, Nedergaard started her career as a program director for the European branch of the International Education Centre. A year later, she moved to work for the Confederation of Danish Employers as a consultant until 2002.

Throughout Nedergaard's political career, she was a spokesperson for various topics including information technology, education and food. At the 2001 Danish general elections, Nedergard was elected to the Folketing for the North Jutland County riding. After her term expired in 2007, she was reelected to the Folketing during the 2007 Danish general elections.

During her second term at the Folketinget, Nedergaard was selected to become the Education Minister of Denmark on February 23, 2010, after a cabinet reshuffle. During her position as education minister, Nedergaard proposed for Danish high schools to teach Chinese as another language. On March 8, 2011, Nedergaard left her position as education minister after the resignation of Birthe Roenn Hornbech due to personal matters. Her second term at the Folketing ended in 2015.

Political offices
Preceded by Bertel Haarder	Education Minister of Denmark; 23 February 2010 – 8 March 2011	Succeeded by Troels Lund Poulsen
