= Deputy Prime Minister of Denmark =

Senior government minister in Denmark

Deputy Prime Minister of the Kingdom of Denmark
- Vicestatsminister (Danish)
- National Coat of arms of Denmark
- Incumbent; Vacant since 3 June 2026
- Government of Denmark
- Style: His/Her Excellency (official)
- Status: Vacant
- Member of: Cabinet; Council of State
- Reports to: Prime Minister
- Seat: Christiansborg Palace, Copenhagen
- Appointer: The Monarch on advice of the Prime Minister
- Unofficial names: Deputy Prime Minister
- Salary: 1.540.212,27 DKK (€206,623), in 2024

The deputy prime minister of Denmark (Danish: Vicestatsminister, lit. 'Vice minister of state') is an office sometimes held by a minister in the Government of the Kingdom of Denmark. In the absence of the prime minister of Denmark, the deputy prime minister takes over their functions, such as chairing the Cabinet of Denmark and participating in the Council of State.

The title used to be an informal description sometimes used, especially by the press, for the minister who is second in the order of precedence.

Traditionally, the minister of foreign affairs holds the second rank. It is only when the order of precedence deviates from this tradition, that number two is referred to as vicestatsminister. This happens in the unusual case when the leader of the second-largest coalition party is not minister of foreign affairs. In some cases the leader of the third-largest coalition party, who is as a matter of course third in precedence, has been called 2nd deputy prime minister (Danish: 2. vicestatsminister). This tradition goes back at least to 1957.

The position was formally established by Royal decree in the Frederiksen II Cabinet, with Venstre leader Jakob Ellemann-Jensen being appointed to the position, in addition to being Minister of Defence. On 23 October 2023 he resigned and was replaced by Troels Lund Poulsen.

== List ==
No.	Portrait	Name (birth–death)	Term of office			Party	Cabinet	Ref.
No.	Portrait	Name (birth–death)	Took office	Left office	Time in office	Party	Cabinet	Ref.
1		Jakob Ellemann-Jensen (born 1973)	15 December 2022	23 October 2023	312 days	Venstre	Frederiksen II	
2		Troels Lund Poulsen (born 1976)	23 October 2023	3 June 2026	2 years, 223 days	Venstre	Frederiksen II	
