= Simon Emil Ammitzbøll-Bille =

Danish politician

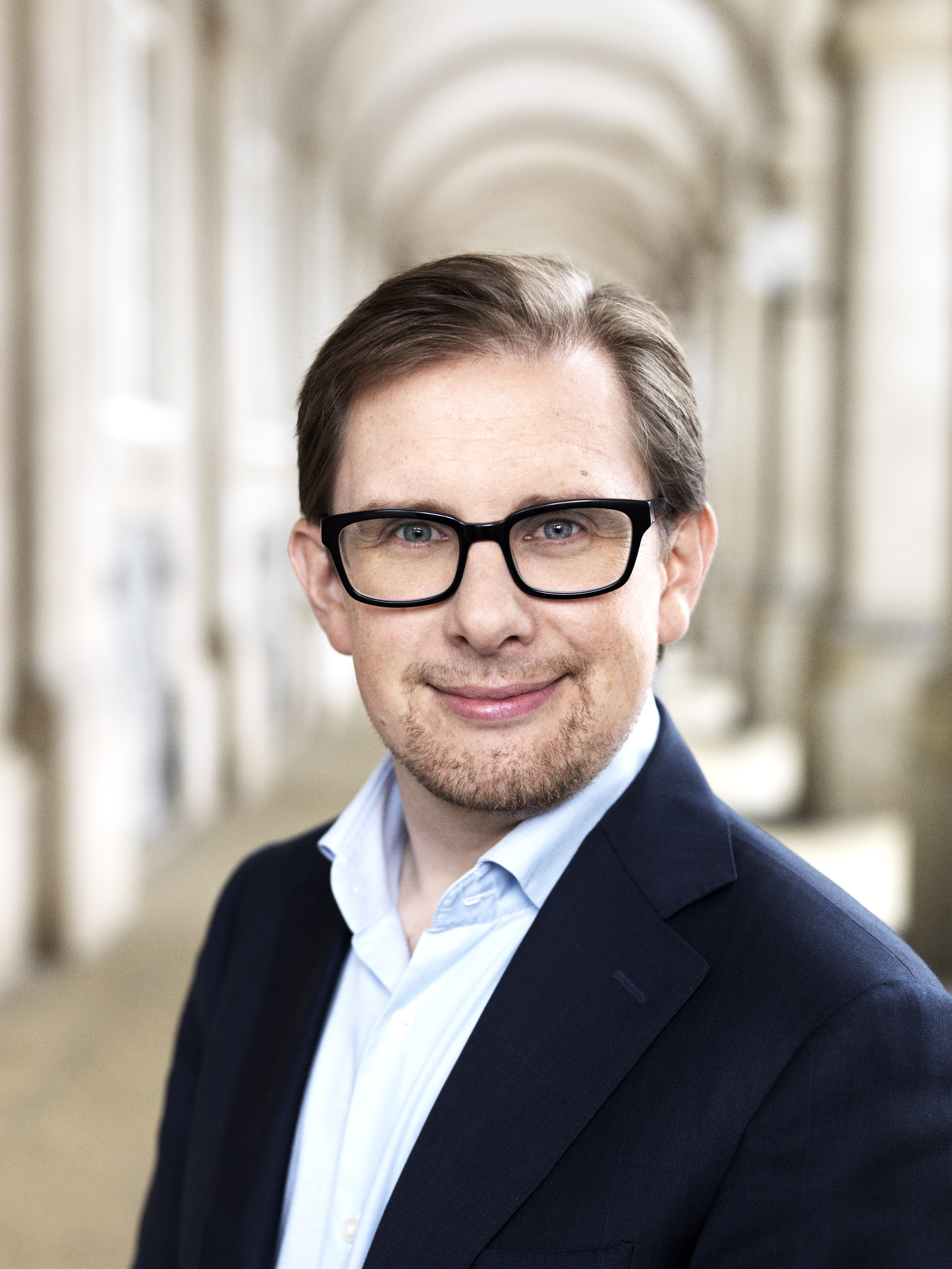

Member of the Folketing
- In office 8 February 2005 – 1 November 2022
- Constituency: Copenhagen (2011-); Zealand (2007-2011); Storstrøm (2005-2007)

Minister for Economic Affairs and the Interior
- In office 28 November 2016 – 27 June 2019
- Prime Minister: Lars Løkke Rasmussen
- Preceded by: Karen Ellemann
- Succeeded by: Astrid Krag

Leader of Forward
- In office 7 November 2019 – 8 October 2020
- Preceded by: Party formed
- Succeeded by: Party dissolved

Personal details
- Born: Simon Emil Ammitzbøll; 20 October 1977 (age 48) Hillerød, Denmark
- Party: Forward (2019–2020); Liberal Alliance (2009–2019); Borgerligt Centrum (2009); Danish Social Liberal Party (until 2008)
- Spouses: Henning Olsen (m. 2005; died 2016) Kristine Bille (m. 2017)
- Cabinet: L.L. Rasmussen III

Simon Emil Ammitzbøll-Bille (born 20 October 1977, in Hillerød) is a former Danish politician, and a former independent member of the Parliament of Denmark. He is former Minister of Economy and Interior.

He was formerly a member of Radikale Venstre and Liberal Alliance.

== Political career ==
On 10 October 2008 he and a number of followers founded the party Borgerligt Centrum (English: Civic Centre). On 13 October 2008 he left the Social Liberal Party, which he had represented in parliament since the 2005 elections. On 6 January 2009 the incorporation of Borgerligt Centrum was announced.

On 16 June 2009, he announced that he had joined Liberal Alliance and dissolved Borgerligt Centrum. The dissolution was strongly contested by those members of the board who did not follow him in leaving the party. The remaining board members of the Borgerligt Centrum initiated legal proceedings against Ammitzbøll. He is notable for being the only Danish member of parliament to have been member of three different parties in less than a year. On 30 August 2011, and with 5.0% voter support, Ammitzbøll, told on air to Danish Radio, that a vote for the Liberal Alliance is a vote for free hashish.

On 22 October 2019, Ammitzbøll-Bille left Liberal Alliance, citing political differences. On 7 November he founded the party Forward together with Christina Egelund, also former MP from Liberal Alliance. On 8 October 2020 Ammitzbøll-Bille announced Forward was disbanded, and he would continue as an independent member of parliament.

== Personal life ==
Ammitzbøll-Bille is openly bisexual, and was married to another man, Henning Olsen until Olsen died in August 2016, after a long battle with cancer. In June 2017 he began a relationship with Kristine Bille, whom he married in November 2017. In October 2017, they announced that they are expecting their first child in the Spring of 2018.

He was named the year's politician in 2006 by LGBT Danmark. LGBT rights have also been among Ammitzbøll's political affairs. In November 2008, he proposed a parliamentary resolution that would allow couples in a registered partnership to adopt children from other countries. Thanks to the support of the members of Liberal Alliance in the vote on 17 March 2009, the proposal was adopted, and same-sex couples were able to adopt jointly in Denmark from 2010.

=== Baltic Pride ===
Ammitzbøll-Bille traveled to Latvia in July 2006 to attend the second Baltic Pride. However, the parade had to be canceled shortly before, when the police of Riga were unable to guarantee the safety of the participants. The organizers decided to hold a conference on LGBT rights in Riga to replace the parade. However, they were attacked by angry demonstrators who surrounded a church in which Ammitzbøll-Bille and the other participants were part of that day's program. For several hours, the protesters shouted slogans and threw eggs, tomatoes and stools against the participants. After the event, Ammitzbøll-Bille stated about his experiences in the media, and in conjunction with other EU politicians, called for more rights for minorities in the former Soviet countries.

On 3 June 2007 Ammitzbøll-Bille traveled again to Latvia, and this time it was possible to complete the parade with the protection of the Latvian authorities.

Political offices
Preceded by Karen Ellemann	Minister of the Interior; 2016-2019	Succeeded by Astrid Krag
Preceded by Morten Østergaard	Minister for Economic Affairs; 2016-2019	Position abolished
