= Jakob Ellemann-Jensen =

Danish politician (born 1973)

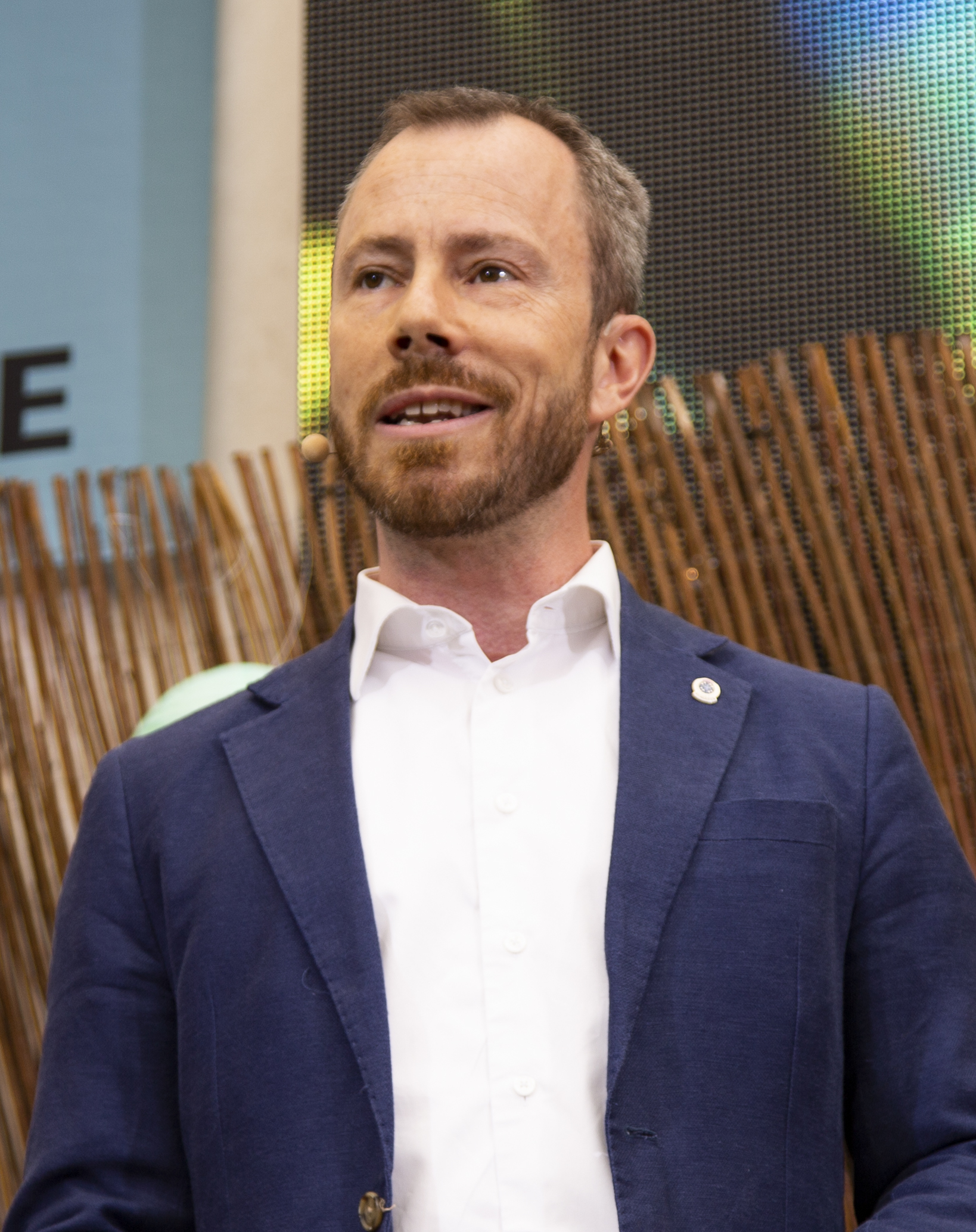
- Ellemann-Jensen in 2020

Deputy Prime Minister of Denmark
- In office 15 December 2022 – 23 October 2023
- Prime Minister: Mette Frederiksen
- Preceded by: Office established
- Succeeded by: Troels Lund Poulsen

Minister for Economic Affairs
- In office 22 August 2023 – 23 October 2023
- Prime Minister: Mette Frederiksen
- Preceded by: Troels Lund Poulsen
- Succeeded by: Troels Lund Poulsen

Minister of Defence
- In office 15 December 2022 – 22 August 2023; On leave: 6 February 2023 – 1 August 2023
- Prime Minister: Mette Frederiksen
- Preceded by: Morten Bødskov
- Succeeded by: Troels Lund Poulsen

Leader of Venstre
- In office 21 September 2019 – 23 October 2023
- Deputy: Inger Støjberg (2019–2020); Stephanie Lose (2021–present)
- Preceded by: Lars Løkke Rasmussen
- Succeeded by: Troels Lund Poulsen

Member of the Folketing
- In office 15 September 2011 – 23 October 2023
- Constituency: Funen (2011–2015); East Jutland (2015–2023)

Minister for Environment and Food
- In office 2 May 2018 – 27 June 2019
- Prime Minister: Lars Løkke Rasmussen
- Preceded by: Esben Lunde-Larsen
- Succeeded by: Lea Wermelin (Environment); Mogens Jensen (Food)

Personal details
- Born: 25 September 1973 (age 53) Hørsholm, Denmark
- Party: Venstre (1991–2023)
- Spouse: Anne Marie Preisler
- Children: 3
- Parent: Uffe Ellemann-Jensen (father)
- Relatives: Karen Ellemann (sister)
- Education: Copenhagen Business School

Military service
- Allegiance: Denmark
- Branch/service: Royal Danish Army
- Years of service: 1992–2000
- Rank: Captain
- Battles/wars: Bosnian War

Jakob Ellemann-Jensen (born 25 September 1973) is a Danish former politician who served as Deputy Prime Minister of Denmark and Minister of Defence under Prime Minister Mette Frederiksen from 2022 to 2023. He led the Venstre party from 2019 to 2023.

A member of the Folketing since the 2011 general election, Ellemann-Jensen served as Minister for Environment and Food under Prime Minister Lars Løkke Rasmussen from 2018 to 2019. He was spokesman on political affairs for Venstre from 2015 to 2018 and again briefly in 2019.

== Early life and education ==
Ellemann-Jensen was born on 25 September 1973 in Hørsholm, approximately 25 km (15.5 mi) north of Copenhagen. He is the son of former Foreign Minister Uffe Ellemann-Jensen and former editor-in-chief Alice Vestergaard.

== Early career ==
Ellemann-Jensen graduated from N. Zahle's School in 1992. He went on to complete his BSc at the Copenhagen Business School in 1999, as well as his MSc in 2002, also at Copenhagen Business School. From 2000 to 2002, he worked as a legal advisor for PricewaterhouseCoopers and from 2002 to 2005 as a lawyer at IBM Denmark, where he later became head of the contract and negotiation department. From 2007 to 2011, he worked as a corporate lawyer for GN Store Nord.

== Political career ==
Ellemann-Jensen was first elected into parliament in the 2011 general election, receiving 7,786 votes; he was reelected in the 2015 election with 8,678 votes.

In 2018, Ellemann-Jensen became the Minister for Environment and Food in the third Løkke Rasmussen cabinet.

Ellemann-Jensen was elected again in the 2019 Danish general election, receiving 19,388 votes. After Lars Løkke Rasmussen stepped down as Venstre's party leader after the election, the party elected Ellemann-Jensen as the new leader.

On 15 December 2022, he was appointed minister of defence and deputy prime minister in Mette Frederiksen's second cabinet following the 2022 election.

In February 2023, Ellemann-Jensen announced that he would go on sick leave after having experienced stress symptoms and a brief admission to the hospital; Minister for Economic Affairs Troels Lund Poulsen acted Defence Minister in Ellemann-Jensen's absence. He returned on 1 August 2023. On 23 October 2023, he announced his resignation as party leader and his departure from Danish politics.

== Other activities ==
- European Council on Foreign Relations (ECFR), Member of the Council
- Trilateral Commission, Member of the European Group

== Notes ==
Political offices
Preceded by Esben Lunde Larsen	Minister for Environment and Food; 2018–2019	Succeeded by Lea Wermelin as Minister of Environment
Preceded by Esben Lunde Larsen	Minister for Environment and Food; 2018–2019	Succeeded by Mogens Jensen as Minister of Food
Preceded by Morten Bødskov	Minister of Defence; 2022–present	Incumbent
Party political offices
Preceded by Kristian Jensen; Acting	Leader of Venstre; 2019–present	Incumbent
