= Kristian Jensen =

Danish politician

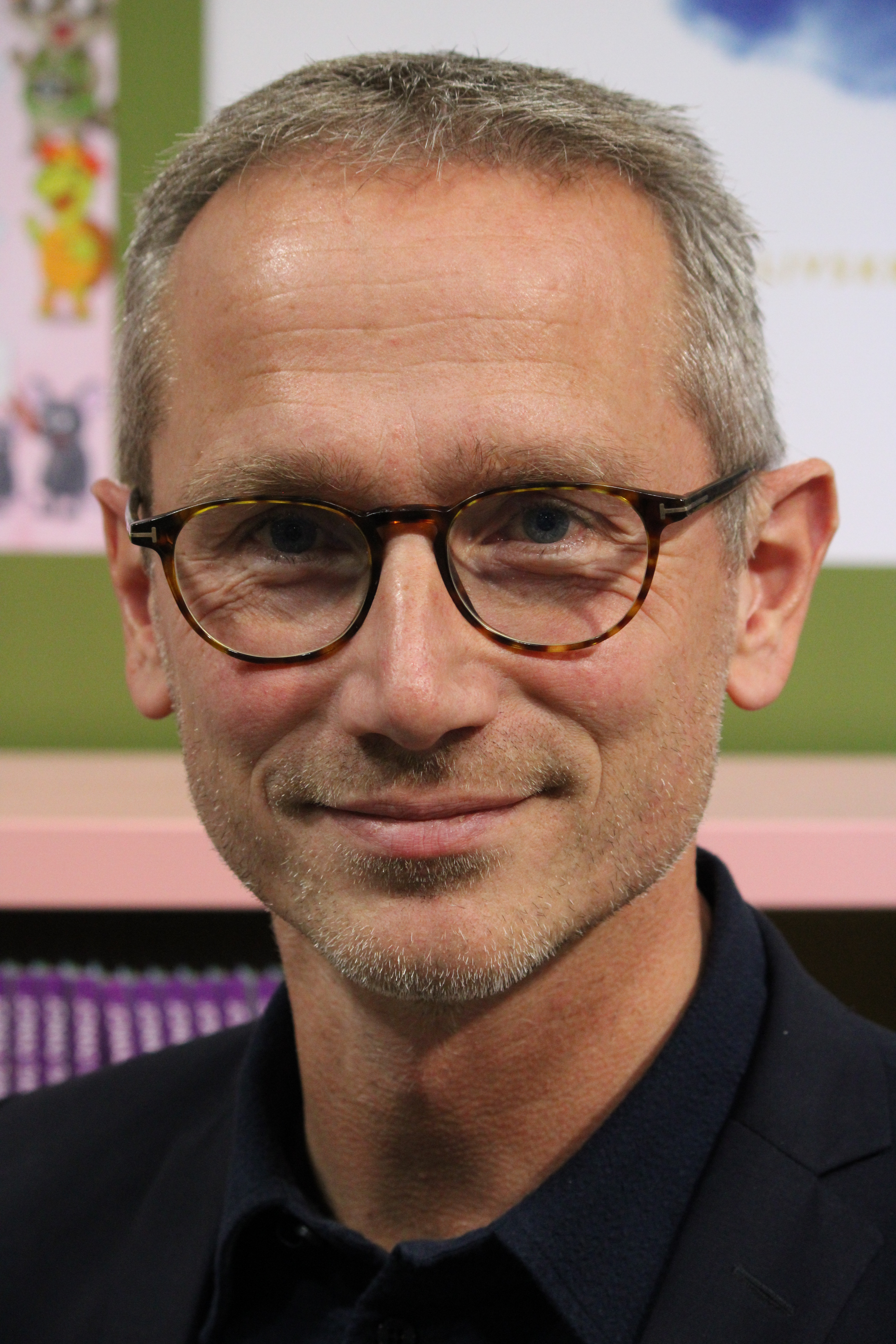
- Jensen in 2025

Minister of Finance
- In office 28 November 2016 – 27 June 2019
- Prime Minister: Lars Løkke Rasmussen
- Preceded by: Claus Hjort
- Succeeded by: Nicolai Wammen

Minister of Foreign Affairs
- In office 28 June 2015 – 28 November 2016
- Prime Minister: Lars Løkke Rasmussen
- Preceded by: Martin Lidegaard
- Succeeded by: Anders Samuelsen

Minister of Taxation
- In office 2 August 2004 – 24 February 2010
- Prime Minister: Anders Fogh Rasmussen; Lars Løkke Rasmussen
- Preceded by: Svend Erik Hovmand
- Succeeded by: Troels Lund Poulsen

Member of the Folketing
- In office 11 March 1998 – 31 March 2021
- Constituency: West Jutland (from 2007); Ringkøbing (1998-2007)

Leader of Venstre Acting
- In office 31 August 2019 – 21 September 2019
- Preceded by: Lars Løkke Rasmussen
- Succeeded by: Jakob Ellemann-Jensen

Personal details
- Born: 21 May 1971 (age 55) Middelfart, Denmark
- Party: Venstre

Kristian Jensen (born 21 May 1971 in Middelfart) is a Danish politician who was Minister for Foreign Affairs of Denmark from 2015 to 2016, Minister of Finance from 2016 to 2019 and Minister of Taxation from 2004 to 2010. Jensen is a member of the liberal party Venstre. He briefly served as acting chairman of Venstre in 2019. From 1998 to 2021 he was a member of the Folketing.

== Political career ==
Jensen has been a member of parliament (Folketinget) since 11 March 1998. He was the Venstre's spokesman on information technology and sports from 1998 to 2001 and became its spokesman on finance policy, as well as Vice-Chairman of the Financial Affairs Committee, in 2001. He was the Minister for Taxation from 2004 to 2010 and has been During his time as Tax Minister, Kristian Jensen was a keen proponent of a "tax freeze." At the liberal party's congress on 17 May 2009, Kristian Jensen was elected as deputy chairman of the liberal party, without any other candidates running for the post. In 2010 he stepped down as a member of the cabinet to focus on party organisational matters. He was a leading spokesman for the party during the time in opposition, from 2011 to 2015.

After the election for the Danish parliament in June 2015 Venstre was able to form a minority government, with Jensen becoming Minister of Foreign Affairs on 28 June 2015. He was made Minister of Finance in 2016. On 31 August 2019 Lars Løkke Rasmussen stepped down as chairman of the party, and Jensen became acting chairman in his place. He was succeeded on 21 September 2019 by Jakob Ellemann-Jensen.

In January 2021 he was appointed political ambassador for the Danish Ministry of Foreign Affairs, set to secure Denmark a place in the UN Security Council.

== Personal life ==
Until 2019, he was married to Trine Jensen. Since then, he has been married to singer Pernille Rosendahl.

== Honours ==
- Order of the Dannebrog, Commander

Political offices
Preceded by Svend Erik Hovmand	Minister for Taxation; 2004–2010	Succeeded by Troels Lund Poulsen
Preceded by Martin Lidegaard	Minister for Foreign Affairs; 2015–2016	Succeeded by Anders Samuelsen
Preceded by Claus Hjort Frederiksen	Minister of Finance; 2016–2019	Succeeded by Nicolai Wammen
Preceded by Lars Løkke Rasmussen	Leader of the Opposition; Acting; 2019	Succeeded by Jakob Ellemann-Jensen
Party political offices
Preceded by Lars Løkke Rasmussen	Leader of Venstre; Acting; 2019	Succeeded by Jakob Ellemann-Jensen
