= Stephanie Lose =

Danish politician (born 1982)

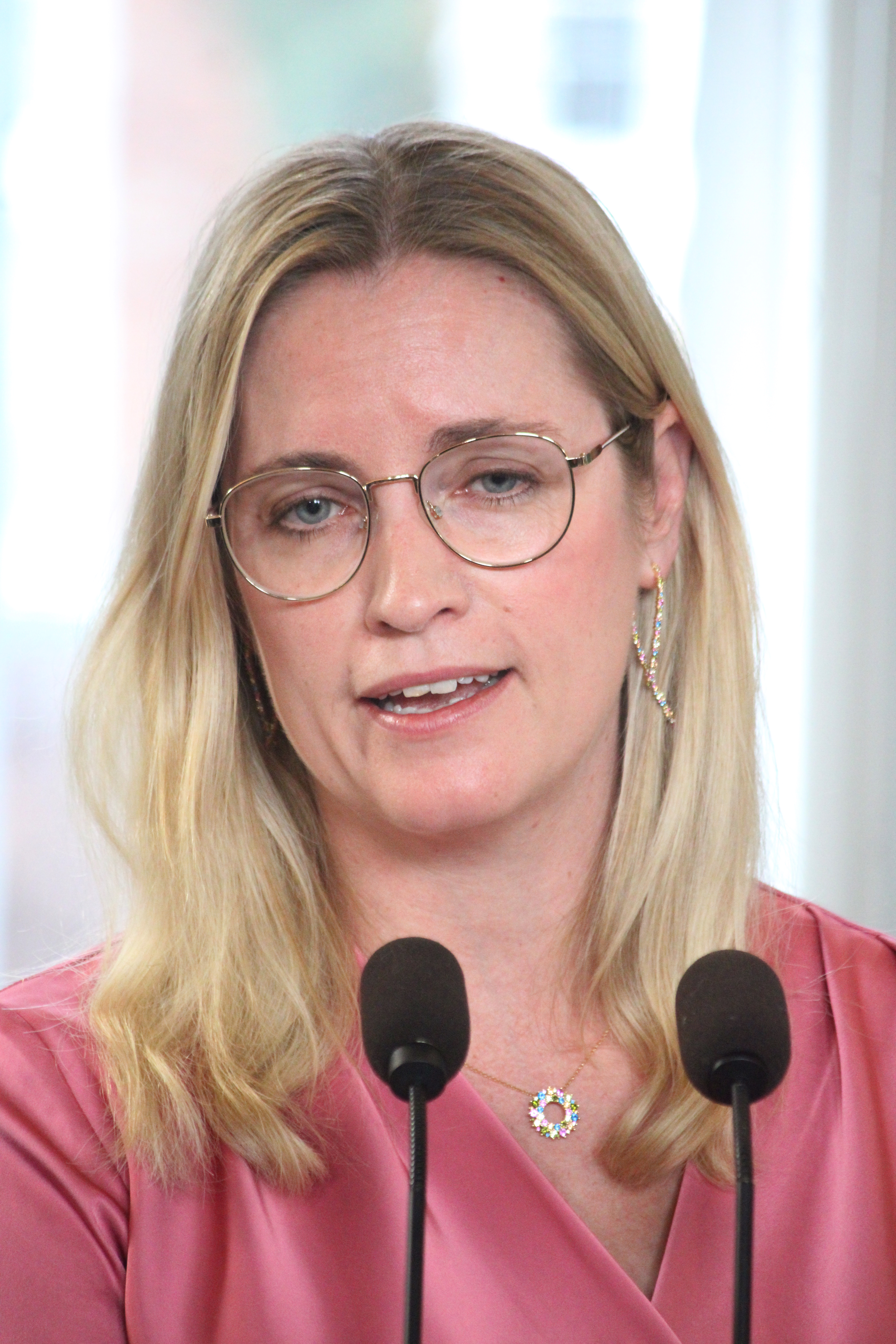
- in 2026

Minister for Economic Affairs
- In office 23 November 2023 – 3 June 2026
- Prime Minister: Mette Frederiksen
- Preceded by: Troels Lund Poulsen
- Succeeded by: Pia Olsen Dyhr

Deputy Leader of Venstre
- Incumbent
- Assumed office 25 January 2021
- Leader: Jakob Ellemann-Jensen; Troels Lund Poulsen
- Preceded by: Inger Støjberg

Personal details
- Born: Stephanie Kristensen; 14 December 1982 (age 43) Løgumkloster, Denmark
- Party: Venstre

Stephanie Lose (née Kristensen; born 14 December 1982) is a Danish politician of Venstre who served as minister for economic affairs since 2023 until 2026. She is the deputy leader of Venstre since 2021, and chaired the Regional Council of Southern Denmark from 2015 to 2023. From March to July 2023, she served as minister without portfolio.

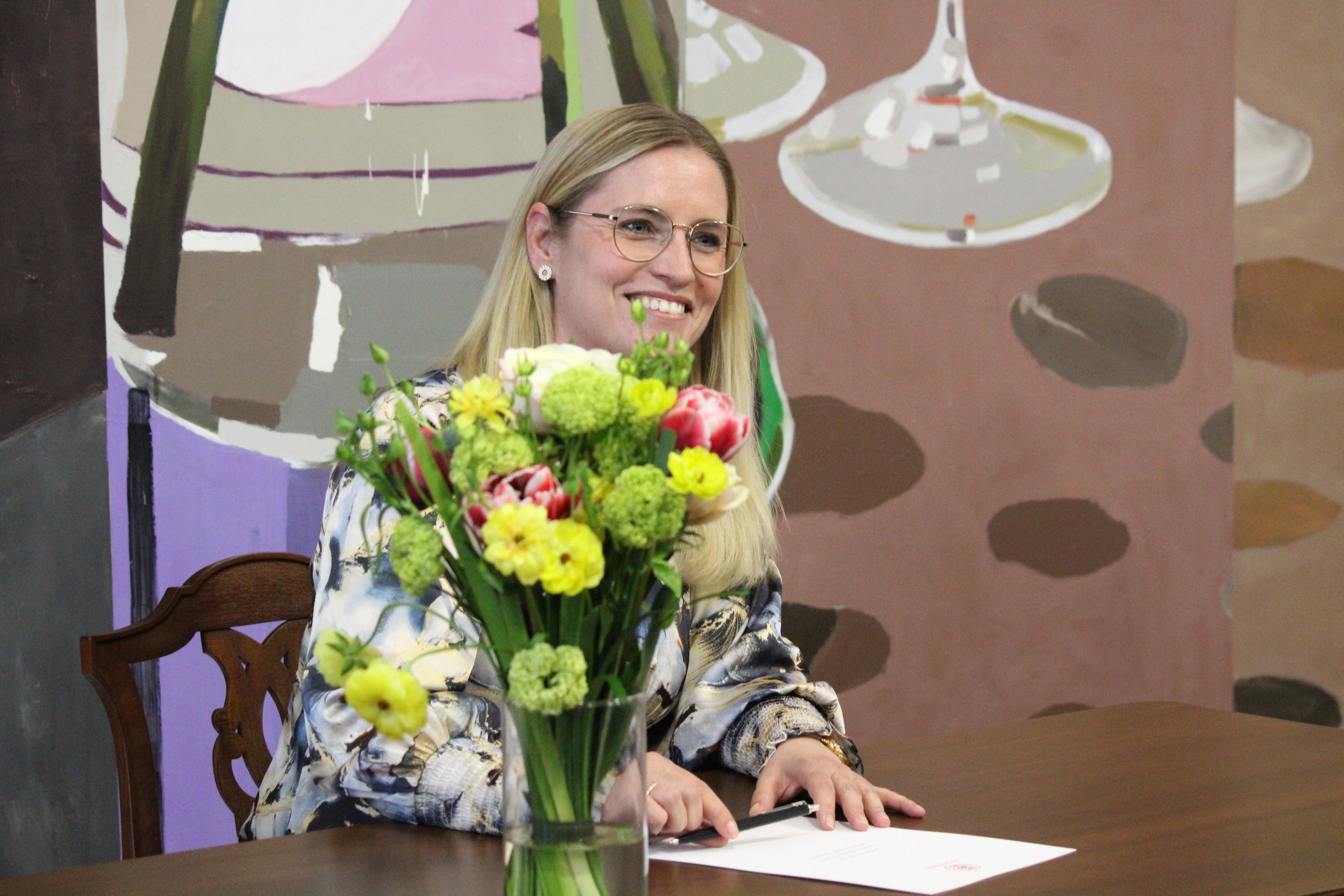
Lose signing a pledge to uphold the Danish Constitution at Christiansborg, 14 April 2026
