= Ivar Nørgaard =

Danish politician

Ivar Nørgaard (26 July 1922 – 3 November 2011), also spelled Ivar Noergaard, was a Danish politician, former economics minister and member of the Social Democrats. Nørgaard led the negotiations for Denmark's ascension into the European Union in 1973.

Nørgaard served as the head of several ministries within Social Democratic governments during the 1960s and 1970s. He supported Denmark's membership into the European Economic Community, the predecessor of the European Union, and headed his country's successful negotiations. Nørgaard was an opponent of the euro and the eurozone.

Nørgaard was married and had children. He died of a cerebral blood clot on 3 November 2011, at the age of 89.
