= Minister of Agriculture (Denmark) =

Danish government minister

- Landbrugsminister
- State coat of arms of the Kingdom of Denmark

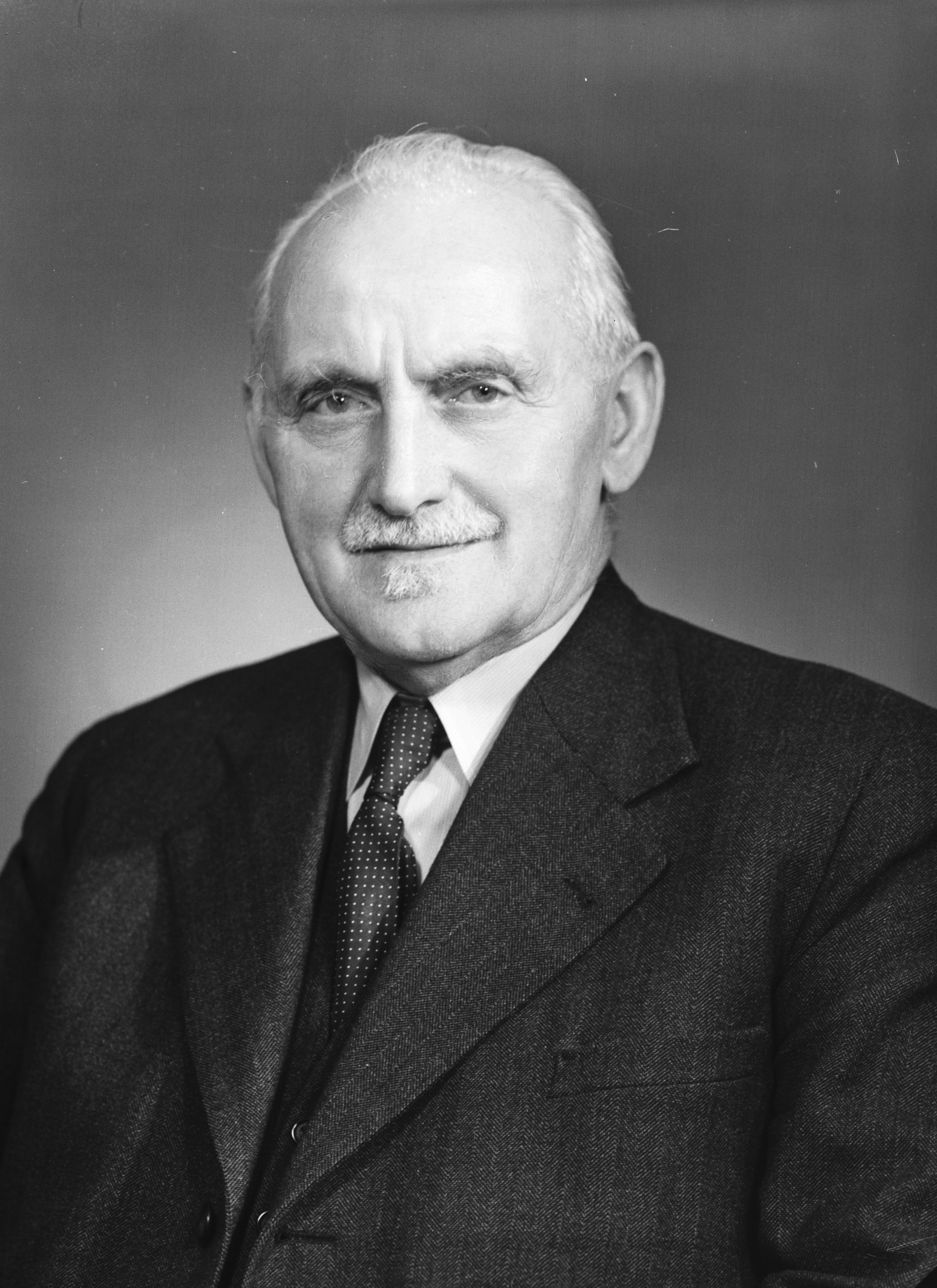
- Longest serving Kristen Bording; 23 April 1924 – 14 December 1926; 30 April 1929 – 9 November 1935; 9 November 1935 – 29 August 1943
- Ministry of Food, Agriculture and Fisheries
- Type: Minister
- Member of: Cabinet; State Council
- Reports to: the Prime minister
- Seat: Slotsholmen
- Appointer: The Monarch (on the advice of the Prime Minister)
- Precursor: Minister of the Interior
- Formation: 22 May 1896; 130 years ago
- First holder: Knud Sehested
- Final holder: Jacob Jensen
- Abolished: 3 June 2026; 3 months ago
- Superseded by: Minister of Nature and Animal Welfare
- Succession: depending on the order in the State Council
- Deputy: Permanent Secretary
- Salary: 1.400.192,97 DKK (€187,839), in 2024
- Website: Official website

Minister of Agriculture (Danish: Landbrugsminister) is a Danish ministerial office. The responsibilities were originally placed with the minister of the Interior, before becoming an independent post in 1896.

== List of ministers ==
No.	Portrait	Name (born–died)	Term of office			Political party	Government	Ref.
No.	Portrait	Name (born–died)	Took office	Left office	Time in office	Political party	Government	Ref.
Minister for Agriculture (Landbrugsminister)
1		Knud Sehested (1850–1909)	22 May 1896	23 May 1897	1 year, 1 day	Højre	Reedtz-Thott	
2		Alfred Hage (1843–1922)	23 May 1897	27 April 1900	2 years, 339 days	Højre	Hørring	
3		Frederik Friis (1836–1917)	27 April 1900	24 July 1901	1 year, 88 days	Højre	Sehested	
4		Ole Hansen (1855–1928)	24 July 1901	24 July 1908	7 years, 0 days	Venstre Reform	Deuntzer; Christensen I	
5		Anders Nielsen (1862–1914)	24 July 1908	28 October 1909	1 year, 96 days	Venstre Reform	Christensen II; Neergaard I Holstein-Ledreborg	
6		Poul Christensen (1854–1935)	28 October 1909	5 July 1910	250 days	Venstre Reform	Zahle I	
(5)		Anders Nielsen (1862–1914)	5 July 1910	21 June 1913	1 year, 96 days	Venstre	Berntsen	
7		Kristjan Pedersen (1857–1927)	21 June 1913	30 March 1920	6 years, 283 days	Social Liberal	Zahle II	
–		Waldemar Oxholm (1868–1945) acting	30 March 1920	5 April 1920	6 days	Independent	Liebe	
8		Christian Sonne (1859–1941)	5 April 1920	5 May 1920	30 days	Independent	Friis	
9		Thomas Madsen-Mygdal (1876–1943)	5 May 1920	23 April 1924	3 years, 354 days	Venstre	Neergaard II–III	
10		Kristen Bording (1876–1967)	23 April 1924	14 December 1926	2 years, 235 days	Social Democrats	Stauning I	
(9)		Thomas Madsen-Mygdal (1876–1943)	14 December 1926	30 April 1929	2 years, 137 days	Venstre	Madsen-Mygdal	
(10)		Kristen Bording (1876–1967)	30 April 1929	9 November 1935	6 years, 193 days	Social Democrats	Stauning II–III	
Minister for Agriculture and Fisheries (Landbrug og fiskerisminister)
(10)		Kristen Bording (1876–1967)	9 November 1935	29 August 1943	7 years, 293 days	Social Democrats	Stauning III–IV–V–VI; Buhl I Scavenius	
No Danish government (29 August 1943 (Note: On 29 August 1943, the Danish government resigned, refusing to grant further concessions to Nazi Germany. All government operations were assumed by the permanent secretaries of the individual departments, and this arrangement lasted until the Liberation of Denmark on 5 May 1945. Since King Christian X never accepted the resignation of the government, it existed de jure until a new cabinet was formed on 5 May 1945.) – 5 May 1945). Office is assumed by the permanent secretary.
11		Erik Eriksen (1902–1972)	5 May 1945	13 November 1947	2 years, 192 days	Venstre	Buhl II; Kristensen	
Minister for Agriculture (Landbrugsminister)
(10)		Kristen Bording (1876–1967)	13 November 1947	16 September 1950	2 years, 307 days	Social Democrats	Hedtoft I	
12		Carl Petersen (1894–1984)	16 September 1950	30 October 1950	2 years, 307 days	Social Democrats	Hedtoft II	
13		Henrik Hauch (1876–1957)	30 October 1950	13 September 1951	318 days	Venstre	Eriksen	
14		Jens Sønderup (1894–1978)	13 September 1951	30 September 1953	2 years, 17 days	Venstre	Eriksen	
15		Jens Smørum (1891–1976)	30 September 1953	28 May 1957	3 years, 240 days	Social Democrats	Hedtoft III; Hansen I	
16		Karl Skytte (1908–1986)	28 May 1957	26 September 1964	7 years, 121 days	Social Liberal	Hansen II; Kampmann I–II; Krag I	
17		Christian Thomsen (1909–2003)	26 September 1964	2 February 1968	3 years, 129 days	Social Democrats	Krag II	
18		Peter Larsen (1924–1970)	2 February 1968	7 July 1970	2 years, 155 days	Venstre	Baunsgaard	
19		Henry Christensen (1922–1972)	14 July 1970	11 October 1971	1 year, 89 days	Venstre	Baunsgaard	
20		Ib Frederiksen (1927–2018)	11 October 1971	19 December 1973	2 years, 69 days	Social Democrats	Krag III; Jørgensen I	
Minister for Agriculture and Fisheries (Landbrug og fiskerisminister)
20		Ib Frederiksen (1927–2018)	27 September 1973	19 December 1973	1 year, 351 days	Social Democrats	Jørgensen I	
21		Niels Anker Kofoed (1929–2018)	19 December 1973	13 February 1975	1 year, 56 days	Venstre	Hartling	
Minister for Agriculture (Landbrugsminister)
22		Poul Dalsager (1929–2001)	13 February 1975	30 August 1978	3 years, 198 days	Social Democrats	Jørgensen II	
(21)		Niels Anker Kofoed (1929–2018)	30 August 1978	26 October 1979	1 year, 57 days	Venstre	Jørgensen III	
(22)		Poul Dalsager (1929–2001)	26 October 1979	20 January 1981	1 year, 86 days	Social Democrats	Jørgensen IV	
23		Bjørn Westh (born 1944)	20 January 1981	10 September 1982	1 year, 233 days	Social Democrats	Jørgensen V	
(21)		Niels Anker Kofoed (1929–2018)	10 September 1982	12 March 1986	3 years, 183 days	Venstre	Schlüter I	
24		Britta Schall Holberg (1941–2022)	12 March 1986	10 September 1987	1 year, 182 days	Venstre	Schlüter I	
25		Laurits Tørnæs (born 1936)	10 September 1987	25 January 1993	5 years, 137 days	Venstre	Schlüter II–III–IV	
Minister for Agriculture and Fisheries (Landbrug og fiskerisminister)
(23)		Bjørn Westh (born 1944)	25 January 1993	27 September 1994	1 year, 245 days	Social Democrats	P. N. Rasmussen I	
26		Henrik Dam Kristensen (born 1957)	27 September 1994	30 December 1996	2 years, 94 days	Social Democrats	P. N. Rasmussen II	
Minister for Food, Agriculture, Fishery (Minister for fødevarer, landbrug og fiskeri)
27		Rasmus Prehn (born 1973)	19 November 2020	15 December 2022	2 years, 26 days	Social Democrats	Frederiksen I	
28		Jacob Jensen (born 1973)	15 December 2022	3 June 2026	3 years, 170 days	Venstre	Frederiksen II	
