= Minister of Fisheries (Denmark) =

Danish government minister

- Fiskeriminister
- State coat of arms of the Kingdom of Denmark

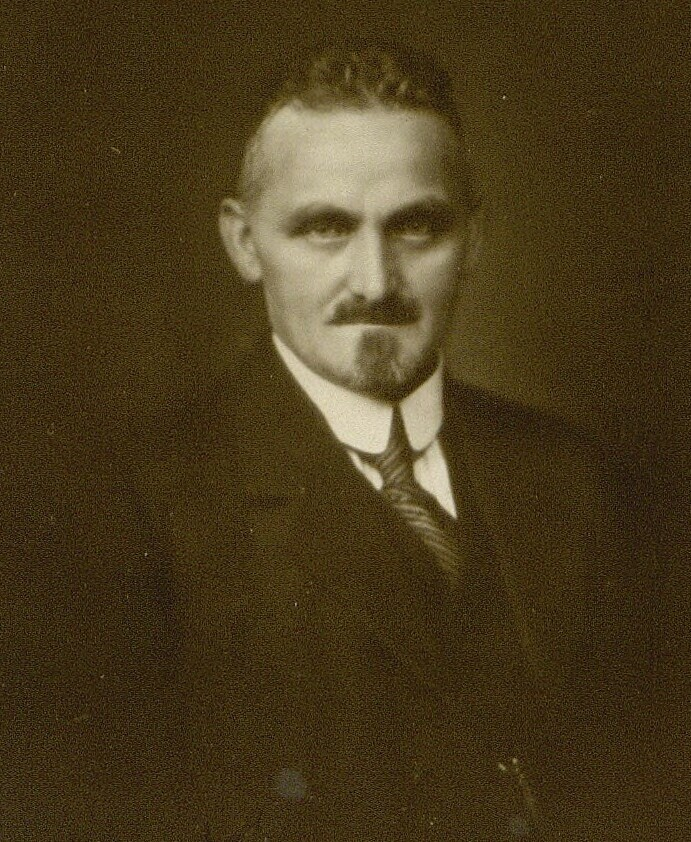
- Longest serving Kristen Bording; 9 November 1935 – 29 August 1943
- Ministry of Food, Agriculture and Fisheries
- Type: Minister
- Member of: Cabinet; State Council
- Reports to: the Prime minister
- Seat: Slotsholmen
- Appointer: The Monarch (on the advice of the Prime Minister)
- Precursor: Minister of Agriculture
- Formation: 30 April 1929; 97 years ago
- First holder: Thorvald Stauning
- Final holder: Jacob Jensen
- Abolished: 3 June 2026; 3 months ago
- Superseded by: Minister of Nature and Animal Welfare
- Succession: depending on the order in the State Council
- Deputy: Permanent Secretary
- Salary: 1.400.192,97 DKK (€187,839), in 2024
- Website: Official website

Minister of Fisheries (Danish: Fiskeriminister) is a Danish ministerial office. The responsibilities were originally placed with the minister of agriculture, before becoming an independent post in 1929.

== List of ministers ==
No.	Portrait	Name (born–died)	Term of office			Political party	Government	Ref.
No.	Portrait	Name (born–died)	Took office	Left office	Time in office	Political party	Government	Ref.
Minister for Seafaring and Fisheries (Minister for søfart og fiskeri)
1		Thorvald Stauning (1873–1942)	30 April 1929	31 May 1933	4 years, 31 days	Social Democrats	Stauning II	
–		Christen Nielsen Hauge (1870–1940) acting	31 May 1933	4 November 1935	2 years, 157 days	Social Democrats	Stauning II	
Minister for Agriculture and Fisheries (Landbrug og fiskerisminister)
2		Kristen Bording (1876–1967)	9 November 1935	29 August 1943	7 years, 293 days	Social Democrats	Stauning III–IV–V–VI; Buhl I Scavenius	
No Danish government (29 August 1943 (Note: On 29 August 1943, the Danish government resigned, refusing to grant further concessions to Nazi Germany. All government operations were assumed by the permanent secretaries of the individual departments, and this arrangement lasted until the Liberation of Denmark on 5 May 1945. Since King Christian X never accepted the resignation of the government, it existed de jure until a new cabinet was formed on 5 May 1945.) – 5 May 1945). Office is assumed by the permanent secretary.
3		Erik Eriksen (1902–1972)	5 May 1945	13 November 1947	2 years, 192 days	Venstre	Buhl II; Kristensen	
Minister for Fisheries (Fiskerisminister)
4		Christian Christiansen (1895–1963)	13 November 1947	30 October 1950	2 years, 351 days	Social Democrats	Hedtoft I–II	
5		Knud Rée (1895–1972)	30 October 1950	30 September 1953	2 years, 335 days	Venstre	Eriksen	
(4)		Christian Christiansen (1895–1963)	30 September 1953	28 May 1957	3 years, 240 days	Social Democrats	Hedtoft III; Hansen I	
6		Oluf Pedersen (1891–1970)	28 May 1957	21 February 1960	2 years, 269 days	Justice Party	Hansen II; Kampmann I	
7		Arnold Chr. Normann (1904–1978)	21 February 1960	26 September 1964	4 years, 218 days	Social Liberal	Kampmann II; Krag I	
8		Hans Larsen-Bjerre (1910–1999)	26 September 1964	8 October 1964	12 days	Social Democrats	Krag II	
9		Jens Risgaard Knudsen (1925–1997)	8 October 1964	2 February 1968	3 years, 117 days	Social Democrats	Krag II	
(7)		Arnold Chr. Normann (1904–1978)	2 February 1968	11 October 1971	3 years, 251 days	Social Liberal	Baunsgaard	
10		Christian Thomsen (1909–2003)	11 October 1971	27 September 1973	1 year, 351 days	Social Democrats	Krag III; Jørgensen I	
Minister for Agriculture and Fisheries (Landbrug og fiskerisminister)
11		Ib Frederiksen (1927–2018)	27 September 1973	19 December 1973	1 year, 351 days	Social Democrats	Jørgensen I	
12		Niels Anker Kofoed (1929–2018)	19 December 1973	13 February 1975	1 year, 56 days	Venstre	Hartling	
Minister for Fisheries (Fiskerisminister)
13		Poul Dalsager (1929–2001)	13 February 1975	26 February 1977	2 years, 13 days	Social Democrats	Jørgensen II	
14		Svend Jakobsen (1935–2022)	26 February 1977	26 October 1979	2 years, 242 days	Social Democrats	Jørgensen II–III	
(13)		Poul Dalsager (1929–2001)	26 October 1979	20 January 1981	1 year, 86 days	Social Democrats	Jørgensen IV	
15		Karl Hjortnæs (born 1934)	20 January 1981	10 September 1982	1 year, 233 days	Social Democrats	Jørgensen IV–V	
16		Henning Grove (1932–2014)	10 September 1982	12 March 1986	3 years, 183 days	Conservative People's Party	Schlüter I	
17		Lars P. Gammelgaard (1945–1994)	12 March 1986	5 October 1989	3 years, 207 days	Conservative People's Party	Schlüter I–II–III	
18		Kent Kirk (born 1948)	5 October 1989	25 January 1993	3 years, 112 days	Conservative People's Party	Schlüter III–IV	
Minister for Agriculture and Fisheries (Landbrug og fiskerisminister)
19		Bjørn Westh (born 1944)	25 January 1993	27 September 1994	1 year, 245 days	Social Democrats	P. N. Rasmussen I	
20		Henrik Dam Kristensen (born 1957)	27 September 1994	30 December 1996	2 years, 94 days	Social Democrats	P. N. Rasmussen II	
Minister for Food, Agriculture and Fisheries (Minister for fødevarer, landbrug og fiskeri)
21		Eva Kjer Hansen (born 1964)	23 November 2007	23 February 2010	2 years, 92 days	Venstre	A. F. Rasmussen III; L. L. Rasmussen I	
22		Henrik Høegh (born 1952)	23 February 2010	3 October 2011	1 year, 222 days	Venstre	L. L. Rasmussen I	
23		Mette Gjerskov (1966–2023)	3 October 2011	9 August 2013	1 year, 310 days	Social Democrats	Thorning-Schmidt I	
24		Karen Hækkerup (born 1974)	9 August 2013	12 December 2013	125 days	Social Democrats	Thorning-Schmidt I	
25		Dan Jørgensen (born 1975)	12 December 2013	28 June 2015	1 year, 198 days	Social Democrats	Thorning-Schmidt I–II	
Minister for Fisheries and Gender Equality (Minister for fiskeri og ligestilling)
26		Karen Ellemann (born 1969)	28 November 2016	2 May 2018	1 year, 155 days	Venstre	L. L. Rasmussen III	
(21)		Eva Kjer Hansen (born 1964)	2 May 2018	27 June 2019	1 year, 56 days	Venstre	L. L. Rasmussen III	
Minister for Food, Fishery and Gender Equality (Minister for fødevarer, fiskeri og ligestilling)
27		Mogens Jensen (born 1963)	27 June 2019	18 November 2020	1 year, 144 days	Social Democrats	Frederiksen I	
Minister for Food, Agriculture, Fishery (Minister for fødevarer, landbrug og fiskeri)
28		Rasmus Prehn (born 1973)	19 November 2020	15 December 2022	2 years, 26 days	Social Democrats	Frederiksen I	
29		Jacob Jensen (born 1973)	15 December 2022	3 June 2026	3 years, 170 days	Venstre	Frederiksen II	
