= Minister of Industry and Trade (Denmark) =

Former government ministerial office

- Minister for industri og handel
- State coat of arms of the Kingdom of Denmark

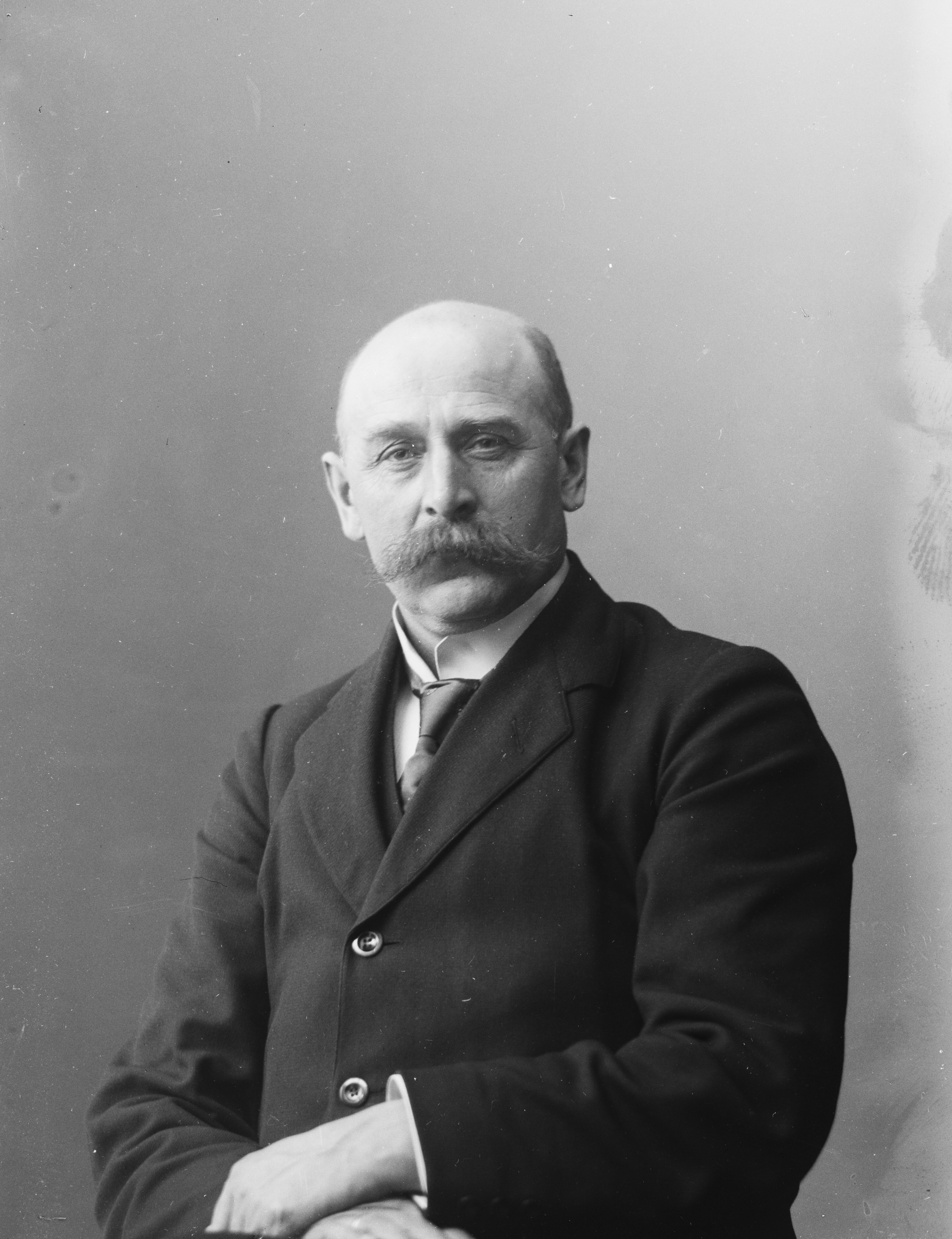
- Longest serving Christen Nielsen Hauge; 30 April 1929–4 November 1935
- Type: Minister
- Member of: Cabinet; State Council
- Reports to: the prime minister
- Seat: Slotsholmen
- Appointer: The Monarch (on the advice of the prime minister)
- Formation: 22 March 1848; 178 years ago
- First holder: Christian Albrecht Bluhme
- Final holder: Mogens Jensen
- Abolished: 28 June 2015; 11 years ago
- Superseded by: Minister of Business Affairs
- Succession: depending on the order in the State Council
- Deputy: Permanent Secretary

The Danish Minister of Industry and Trade (Danish: Minister for industri og handel), was a minister in the government of Denmark, with overall responsibility for strategy and policy across industry and trade, often combined with other areas.

In 1994, the position was abolished, and its tasks were transferred to the minister of business affairs. During Helle Thorning-Schmidt's leadership, the position was shortly revived. It was abolished again by the second Lars Løkke cabinet.

== List of ministers ==
No.	Portrait	Name (born–died)	Term of office			Political party	Government	Ref.
No.	Portrait	Name (born–died)	Took office	Left office	Time in office	Political party	Government	Ref.
Minister of Trade (Handelsminister)
1		Christian Albrecht Bluhme (1794–1866)	22 March 1848	15 November 1848	238 days	Højre	Moltke I	
Minister of Trade and Seafaring (Minister for Handel og Søfart)
2		Johan Hansen (1861–1943)	12 October 1908	28 October 1909	1 year, 16 days	Venstre Reform Party	Neergaard I Holstein-Ledreborg	
3		Wilhelm Weimann (1868–1942)	28 October 1909	5 July 1910	250 days	Social Liberal	Zahle I	
4		Oscar B. Muus (1847–1918)	5 July 1910	21 June 1913	2 years, 351 days	Venstre	Berntsen	
–		Jens Hassing-Jørgensen (1872–1952) acting	21 June 1913	1 April 1914	284 days	Social Liberal	Zahle II	
Minister of Trade (Minister for Handel)
–		Jens Hassing-Jørgensen (1872–1952) acting	1 April 1914	28 April 1914	27 days	Social Liberal	Zahle II	
5		Christopher Hage (1848–1930)	28 April 1914	30 March 1920	5 years, 337 days	Social Liberal	Zahle II	
6		Magnus Suenson (1875–1955)	30 March 1920	5 April 1920	6 days	Independent	Liebe	
7		Hans Peter Prior (1866–1936)	5 April 1920	5 May 1920	30 days	Independent	Friis	
8		Tyge J. Rothe (1877–1970)	5 May 1920	9 October 1922	2 years, 157 days	Venstre	Neergaard II	
–		Oluf Krag (1870–1942) acting	9 October 1922	10 October 1922	1 day	Venstre	Neergaard III	
9		Jørgen Christensen (1871–1937)	10 October 1922	23 April 1924	1 year, 196 days	Venstre	Neergaard III	
Minister of Industry, Trade and Seafaring (Minister for industri, handel og søfart)
10		Thorvald Stauning (1873–1942)	23 April 1924	14 December 1926	2 years, 235 days	Social Democrats	Stauning I	
11		Marius Slebsager (1874–1962)	14 December 1926	3 October 1928	1 year, 294 days	Venstre	Madsen-Mygdal	
–		Thomas Madsen-Mygdal (1876–1943) acting	3 October 1928	6 October 1928	3 days	Venstre	Madsen-Mygdal	
–		Johannes Stensballe (1874–1956) acting	6 October 1928	30 April 1929	206 days	Venstre	Madsen-Mygdal	
Minister of Industry and Trade (Minister for industri og handel)
12		Christen Nielsen Hauge (1870–1940)	30 April 1929	4 November 1935	6 years, 188 days	Social Democrats	Stauning II	
Minister of Industry, Trade and Seafaring (Minister for industri, handel og søfart)
13		Johannes Kjærbøl (1885–1973)	4 November 1935	8 July 1940	4 years, 247 days	Social Democrats	Stauning III–IV–V	
14		John Christmas Møller (1894–1948)	8 July 1940	3 October 1940	87 days	Conservative People's Party	Stauning VI	
15		Halfdan Hendriksen (1881–1962)	3 October 1940	5 May 1945	4 years, 214 days	Conservative People's Party	Stauning VI; Buhl I Scavenius	
16		Vilhelm Fibiger (1886–1978)	5 May 1945	7 November 1945	186 days	Conservative People's Party	Buhl II	
17		Jens Villemoes (1880–1956)	7 November 1945	6 September 1947	1 year, 303 days	Venstre	Kristensen	
18		Axel Kristensen (1895–1971)	6 September 1947	13 November 1947	68 days	Venstre	Kristensen	
19		Jens Otto Krag (1914–1978)	13 November 1947	16 September 1950	2 years, 307 days	Social Democrats	Hedtoft I	
20		Hans Christian Hansen (1906–1960)	16 September 1950	30 October 1950	44 days	Social Democrats	Hedtoft I–II	
21		Ove Weikop (1897–1986)	30 October 1950	13 September 1951	318 days	Conservative People's Party	Eriksen	
22		Aage L. Rytter (1900–1961)	13 September 1951	30 September 1953	2 years, 17 days	Conservative People's Party	Eriksen	
23		Lis Groes (1910–1974)	30 September 1953	28 May 1957	3 years, 240 days	Social Democrats	Hedtoft III; Hansen I	
Minister of Trade, Crafts, Industry and Seafaring (Minister for handel, håndværk, industri og søfart)
24		Kjeld Philip (1912–1989)	28 May 1957	31 March 1960	2 years, 308 days	Social Liberal	Hansen II; Kampmann I	
25		Lars P. Jensen (1909–1986)	31 March 1960	7 September 1961	1 year, 160 days	Social Democrats	Kampmann I–II	
26		Hilmar Baunsgaard (1920–1989)	7 September 1961	26 September 1964	3 years, 19 days	Social Liberal	Kampmann II; Krag I	
(25)		Lars P. Jensen (1909–1986)	26 September 1964	21 September 1966	1 year, 360 days	Social Democrats	Krag II	
27		Tyge Dahlgaard (1921–1985)	21 September 1966	1 Oktober 1967	1 year, 10 days	Social Democrats	Krag II	
28		Ove Hansen (1909–1997)	1 October 1967	2 February 1968	124 days	Social Democrats	Krag II	
29		Knud Thomsen (1908–1996)	2 February 1968	11 October 1971	3 years, 251 days	Conservative People's Party	Baunsgaard	
30		Erling Jensen (1919–2000)	11 October 1971	19 December 1973	2 years, 69 days	Social Democrats	Krag III; Jørgensen I	
31		Poul Nyboe Andersen (1913–2004)	19 December 1973	29 January 1975	1 year, 41 days	Venstre	Hartling	
(30)		Erling Jensen (1919–2000)	29 January 1975	8 September 1976	1 year, 223 days	Social Democrats	Jørgensen II	
32		Per Hækkerup (1915–1979)	8 September 1976	26 February 1977	171 days	Social Democrats	Jørgensen II	
33		Ivar Nørgaard (1922–2011)	26 February 1977	30 August 1978	1 year, 185 days	Social Democrats	Jørgensen II	
34		Arne Christiansen (1925–2007)	26 February 1977	26 October 1979	2 years, 242 days	Venstre	Jørgensen III	
Minister of Industry (Industriminister)
(30)		Erling Jensen (1919–2000)	26 October 1979	10 September 1982	2 years, 319 days	Social Democrats	Jørgensen IV–V	
35		Ib Stetter (1917–1997)	10 September 1982	12 March 1986	3 years, 183 days	Conservative People's Party	Schlüter I	
36		Nils Wilhjelm (1936–2018)	12 March 1986	2 December 1989	3 years, 265 days	Conservative People's Party	Schlüter I–II–III	
37		Anne Birgitte Lundholt (born 1952)	2 December 1989	25 January 1993	3 years, 54 days	Conservative People's Party	Schlüter III–IV	
38		Jan Trøjborg (1955–2012)	25 January 1993	28 January 1994	1 year, 3 days	Social Democrats	P. N. Rasmussen I	
39		Mimi Jakobsen (born 1948)	28 January 1994	8 February 1994	11 days	Centre Democrats	P. N. Rasmussen I	
Minister of Industry and Business Coordination (Industri- og samordningsminister)
(39)		Mimi Jakobsen (born 1948)	8 February 1994	27 September 1994	231 days	Centre Democrats	P. N. Rasmussen I	
None (task assumed by the minister of business affairs); 27 September 1994 – 3 October 2011
Minister of Trade and Investment (Handels- og investeringsminister)
40		Pia Olsen Dyhr (born 1971)	3 October 2011	9 August 2013	1 year, 310 days	Green Left	Thorning-Schmidt I	
Minister of Trade and European Affairs (Handels- og europaminister)
41		Nick Hækkerup (born 1968)	9 August 2013	3 February 2014	178 days	Social Democrats	Thorning-Schmidt I	
Minister of Trade and Development Cooperation (Handels- og udviklingsminister)
42		Mogens Jensen (born 1963)	3 February 2014	28 June 2015	1 year, 145 days	Social Democrats	Thorning-Schmidt II	
None (task assumed by the minister of business affairs); 28 June 2015 – present
