= Buhl Cabinet =

Buhl Cabinet may refer to:

- Buhl I Cabinet
- Buhl II Cabinet
