= Schlüter I cabinet =

Government of Denmark from 1982 to 1984

First Schlüter Cabinet
- 62nd Cabinet of Denmark
- 1982-1984
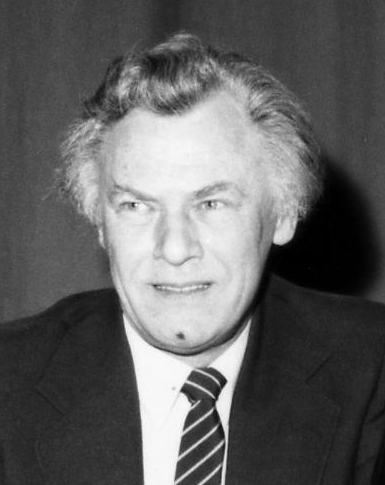
- Schlüter in 1983
- Date formed: 10 September 1982
- Date dissolved: 10 January 1984

People and organisations
- Head of state: Margrethe II of Denmark
- Head of government: Poul Schlüter
- No. of ministers: 21
- Member parties: Conservative People's Party; Venstre; Centre Democrats; Christian Democrats
- Status in legislature: Minority government Supported by: Danish Social Liberal Party; Progress Party
- Opposition parties: Social Democrats; Socialist People's Party; Left Socialists; Union Party; Social Democratic Party; Atassut; Siumut

History
- Legislature term: 1981-1984
- Predecessor: Jørgensen V
- Successor: Schlüter II

The Schlüter I cabinet (also described as the Schlüter I(a) cabinet) was the first cabinet of Prime Minister of Denmark Poul Schlüter. It formed on 10 September 1982, lasting until the 1984 general election on 10 January 1984. The government was a coalition of the Conservative Party, the Agrarian Liberals, the Centre Democrats, and the Christian Democrats. The coalition was a minority government, holding only 65 of the Folketing's 179 seats, and relied heavily on external support from the Progress Party and the Radical Liberals.

Schlüter was the first conservative prime minister since 1901, when Hannibal Sehested of the Højre party was in office, and the first ever from the Conservative Party.

The Schlüter I cabinet is sometimes grouped together with the Schlüter II cabinet formed from the 11 January 1984 until the 1987 Danish general election on 8 September 1987. Even though the two ministries had very similar compositions, political scholars generally agree that a general election marks the end of a cabinet.

== History ==
In the early 1980s, Denmark was suffering from economic problems including high inflation, an unemployment rate of around 10%, and a large government deficit. On 3 September 1982, Anker Jørgensen's government resigned after failing to get support for their austerity policies and Margrethe II invited Poul Schlüter to try to form a new government. Schlüter and his four-party coalition government were sworn into office on 10 September, making the handover one of the quickest in Denmark's history. The new government promised to implement spending cuts across all sectors.

The 1984 general election was called when the coalition's Finance Bill was defeated. After a 10-hour debate on the bill, and with the Social Democrats and the Progress Party opposing it, the government was defeated by 93 votes to 77. At the 1984 election, the coalition increased its seat total to 77, still short of a majority of 90. The Schlüter II cabinet was formed the next day with the same coalition parties and ministers.

== List of ministers ==
Cabinet members
| Portfolio | Minister | Took office | Left office | Party | Ref |
|---|---|---|---|---|---|
| Prime Minister | Poul Schlüter | 10 September 1982 | 10 January 1984 | Conservatives | |
| Minister of Foreign Affairs | Uffe Ellemann-Jensen | 10 September 1982 | 10 January 1984 | Venstre | |
| Minister of the Interior | Britta Schall Holberg | 10 September 1982 | 10 January 1984 | Venstre | |
| Minister of the Economy | Anders Ejnar Andersen | 10 September 1982 | 10 January 1984 | Venstre | |
| Minister of Finance | Henning Christophersen | 10 September 1982 | 10 January 1984 | Venstre | |
| Minister of Justice | Erik Ninn-Hansen | 10 September 1982 | 10 January 1984 | Conservatives | |
| Minister of Defence | Hans Engell | 10 September 1982 | 10 January 1984 | Conservatives | |
| Minister of Labour | Grethe Fenger Møller | 10 September 1982 | 10 January 1984 | Conservatives | |
| Minister of Welfare | Palle Simonsen | 10 September 1982 | 10 January 1984 | Conservatives | |
| Minister of Education | Bertel Haarder | 10 September 1982 | 10 January 1984 | Venstre | |
| Minister of Agriculture | Niels Anker Kofoed | 10 September 1982 | 10 January 1984 | Venstre | |
| Minister of Cultural Affairs | Mimi Jakobsen | 10 September 1982 | 10 January 1984 | Centre Democrats | |
| Minister of Industry | Ib Gunnar Stetter | 10 September 1982 | 10 January 1984 | Conservatives | |
| Minister of Public Works | Arne Melchior | 10 September 1982 | 10 January 1984 | Centre Democrats | |
| Minister of Environment and Nordic Affairs | Christian Christensen | 10 September 1982 | 10 January 1984 | Christian Democrats | |
| Minister of Housing | Niels Bollmann | 10 September 1982 | 10 January 1984 | Centre Democrats | |
| Minister of Energy | Knud Enggaard | 10 September 1982 | 10 January 1984 | Venstre | |
| Minister of Ecclesiastical Affairs | Elsebeth Kock-Petersen | 10 September 1982 | 10 January 1984 | Venstre | |
| Minister of Taxation | Isi Foighel | 10 September 1982 | 10 January 1984 | Conservatives | |
| Minister of Fisheries | Henning Grove | 10 September 1982 | 10 January 1984 | Conservatives | |
| Minister of Greenland | Tom Høyem | 10 September 1982 | 10 January 1984 | Centre Democrats | |
