= Christensen II Cabinet =

Danish government in 1908

Second J. C. Christensen cabinet
- 23rd Cabinet of Denmark

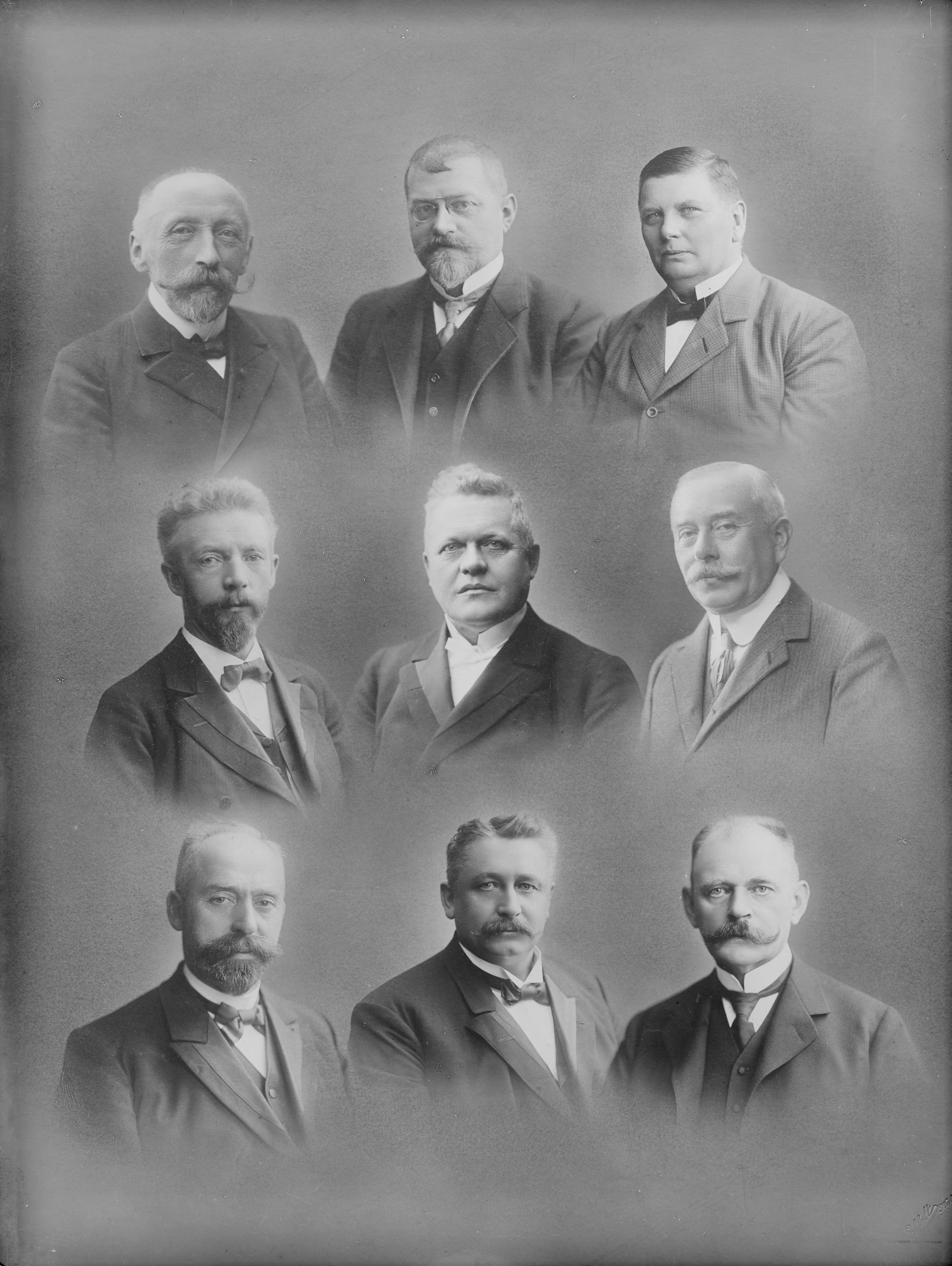
- Date formed: 24 July 1908
- Date dissolved: 12 October 1908

People and organisations
- Head of state: Frederik VIII
- Head of government: Jens Christian Christensen
- Member party: Venstre Reform Party

History
- Election: –
- Outgoing election: –
- Legislature term: 1906–1909
- Predecessor: Christensen I
- Successor: Neergaard I

The Second J. C. Christensen cabinet was the government of Denmark from 24 July 1908 to 12 October 1908.

It was replaced by the Neergaard I Cabinet on 12 October 1908.

== List of ministers and portfolios ==
Some of the terms being before 24 July 1908 because the minister was in the First Christensen Cabinet as well. The cabinet consisted of:

Portfolio	Minister	Took office	Left office	Party
Council President & Minister of Defence	Jens Christian Christensen	14 January 1905	12 October 1908	Venstre Reform
Minister of Foreign Affairs	Frederik Raben-Levetzau	14 January 1905	12 October 1908	Venstre Reform
Minister for Finance	Niels Neergaard	24 July 1908	12 October 1908	Venstre Reform
Kultus Minister	Enevold Sørensen	14 January 1905	12 October 1908	Venstre Reform
Minister of Justice	Svend Høgsbro	24 July 1908	12 October 1908	Venstre Reform
Minister of the Interior	Sigurd Berg	14 January 1905	12 October 1908	Venstre Reform
Minister of Public Works	Jens Jensen-Sønderup	24 July 1908	12 October 1908	Venstre Reform
Minister for Agriculture	Anders Nielsen	24 July 1908	12 October 1908	Venstre Reform
Minister for Iceland	Hannes Hafstein	14 January 1905	12 October 1908	Home Rule

Preceded by Christensen I	Cabinet of Denmark; 24 July 1908 – 12 October 1908	Succeeded by Neergaard I
