= Minister of the Interior (Denmark) =

Danish cabinet position

- Indenrigsminister (Danish)
- State coat of arms of the Kingdom of Denmark

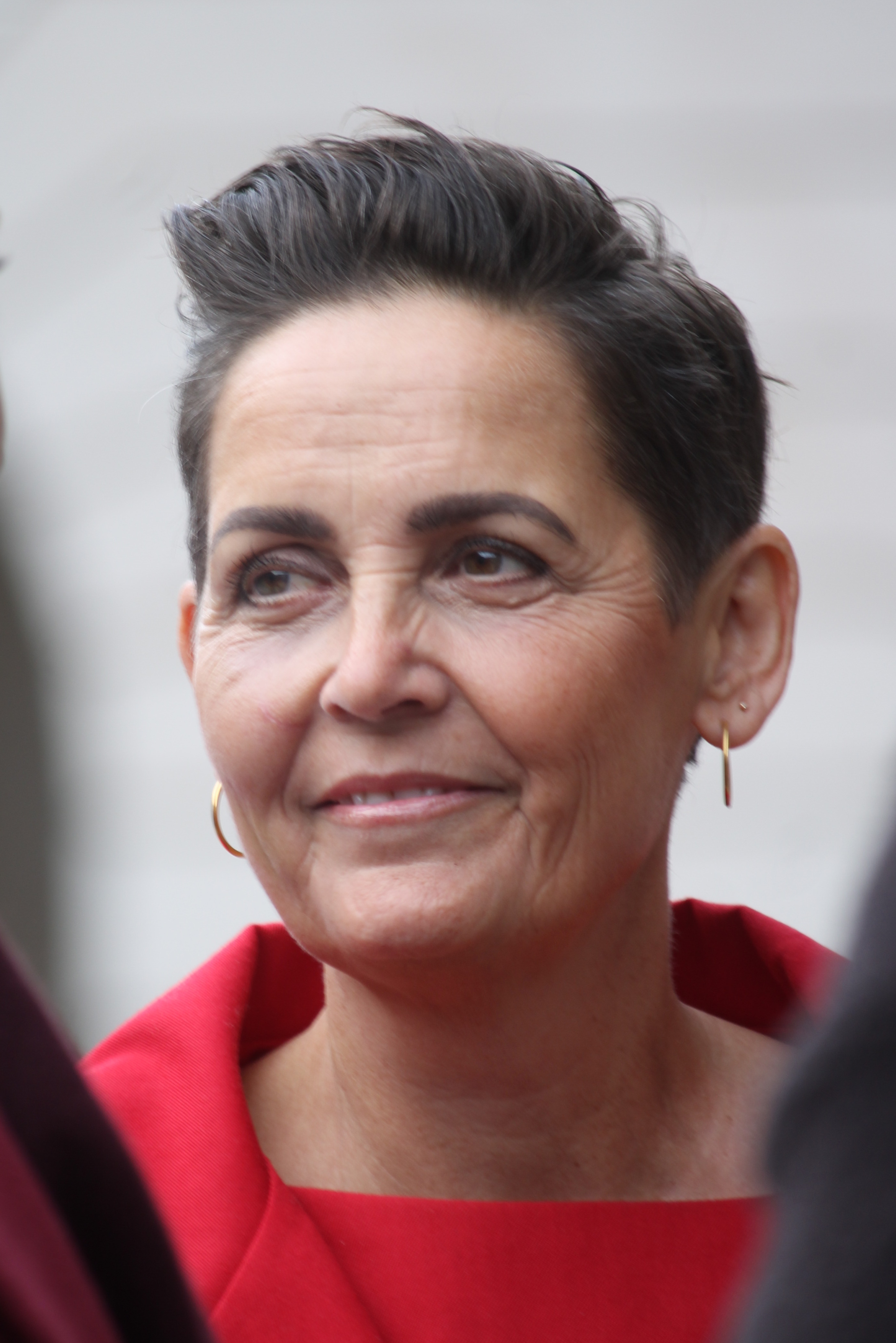
- Incumbent; Pia Olsen Dyhr since 3 June 2026
- Ministry of the Interior
- Type: Minister
- Member of: Cabinet; State Council
- Reports to: the prime minister
- Seat: Slotsholmen
- Appointer: The Monarch; (on the advice of the prime minister)
- Formation: 16 November 1848; 177 years ago
- First holder: Peter Georg Bang
- Succession: depending on the order in the State Council
- Deputy: Permanent Secretary
- Salary: 1.786.953,32 DKK (€239,724), in 2026
- Website: Official website

The Minister of the Interior (Danish: Indenrigsminister) is a member of the Danish cabinet and the head of the Ministry of the Interior.

After the 2007 Folketing elections, the ministry was disbanded, and its areas of responsibility divided between two newly created ministries, the Ministry of Welfare and the Ministry of Health and Prevention. With the announcement of the first Lars Løkke Rasmussen cabinet in 2009, the Ministry of Welfare was abolished and replaced by the Ministry of the Interior and Social Affairs, a de facto re-establishment of two old ministries. Only emancipation affairs were moved to the Ministry of Employment.

== List of interior ministers ==
=== Ministers under Frederick VII (1848–1863) ===
No.	Portrait	Name (born–died)	Term of office			Political party	Government	Ref.
No.	Portrait	Name (born–died)	Took office	Left office	Time in office	Political party	Government	Ref.
1		Peter Georg Bang (1797–1861)	16 November 1848	21 September 1849	309 days	Independent	Moltke I–II	
2		Mathias Hans Rosenørn (1814–1902)	21 September 1849	13 July 1851	1 year, 295 days	Independent	Moltke II	
3		Frederik Ferdinand von Tillisch (1801–1889)	13 July 1851	27 January 1852	198 days	Independent	Moltke III–IV	
(1)		Peter Georg Bang (1797–1861)	27 January 1852	21 April 1853	1 year, 84 days	Højre	Bluhme I	
4		Anders Sandøe Ørsted (1778–1860)	21 April 1853	29 April 1854	1 year, 8 days	Højre	Ørsted	
(3)		Frederik Ferdinand von Tillisch (1801–1889)	29 April 1854	12 December 1854	227 days	National Liberal	Ørsted	
(1)		Peter Georg Bang (1797–1861)	12 December 1854	18 February 1856	4 years, 68 days	Independent	Bang	
5		Carl Frederik Simony (1806–1872)	18 February 1856	4 June 1856	107 days	National Liberal	Bang	
6		Iver Johannes Unsgaard (1798–1872)	4 June 1856	18 October 1856	136 days	Independent	Bang	
7		Andreas Frederik Krieger (1817–1893)	18 October 1856	1 August 1858	1 year, 287 days	National Liberal	Andræ; Hall I	
(6)		Iver Johannes Unsgaard (1798–1872)	1 August 1858	6 May 1859	278 days	Independent	Hall I	
(7)		Andreas Frederik Krieger (1817–1893)	6 May 1859	2 December 1859	210 days	National Liberal	Hall I	
8		Johan Christian von Jessen (1817–1884)	2 December 1859	24 February 1860	84 days	National Liberal	Rotwitt	
9		Ditlev Gothard Monrad (1811–1887)	24 February 1860	15 September 1861	1 year, 172 days	National Liberal	Hall II	
10		Orla Lehmann (1810–1870)	15 September 1861	31 December 1863	2 years, 138 days	National Liberal	Hall II	

=== Ministers under Christian IX (1863–1906) ===
No.	Portrait	Name (born–died)	Term of office			Political party	Government	Ref.
No.	Portrait	Name (born–died)	Took office	Left office	Time in office	Political party	Government	Ref.
11		Carl von Nutzhorn (1828–1899)	31 December 1863	10 May 1864	131 days	Independent	Monrad	
12		Hans Rasmussen Carlsen (1810–1887)	10 May 1864	11 July 1864	62 days	Independent	Monrad	
(3)		Frederik Ferdinand von Tillisch (1801–1889)	11 July 1864	6 November 1865	1 year, 118 days	Independent	Bluhme II	
13		Jacob Brønnum Scavenius Estrup (1825–1913)	6 November 1865	22 September 1869	3 years, 320 days	National Landowners	Krag-Juel-Vind-Frijs	
14		Wolfgang von Haffner (1810–1887)	22 September 1869	28 May 1870	248 days	National Landowners	Krag-Juel-Vind-Frijs	
15		Christen Andreas Fonnesbech (1817–1880)	28 May 1870	14 July 1874	4 years, 47 days	National Landowners	Holstein-Holsteinborg	
16		Fritz Tobiesen (1829–1908)	14 July 1874	11 June 1875	332 days	Independent	Fonnesbech	
17		Erik Skeel (1818–1884)	11 June 1875	29 August 1884	9 years, 79 days	National Landowners	Estrup	
17		Erik Skeel (1818–1884)	11 June 1875	29 August 1884	9 years, 79 days	Højre	Estrup	
18		Hilmar Finsen (1824–1886)	29 August 1884	8 August 1885	344 days	Højre	Estrup	
19		Hans Peter Ingerslev (1831–1896)	8 August 1885	15 January 1894	8 years, 160 days	Højre	Estrup	
20		Hugo Egmont Hørring (1842–1909)	15 January 1894	23 May 1897	3 years, 128 days	Højre	Reedtz-Thott	
21		Vilhelm Bardenfleth (1850–1933)	23 May 1897	28 August 1899	2 years, 97 days	Højre	Hørring	
22		Ludvig Ernst Bramsen (1847–1914)	28 August 1899	24 July 1901	1 year, 330 days	Højre	Hørring; Sehested	
23		Enevold Sørensen (1850–1920)	24 July 1901	14 January 1905	3 years, 174 days	Venstre Reform Party	Deuntzer	
24		Sigurd Berg (1868–1921)	14 January 1905	12 October 1908	3 years, 272 days	Venstre Reform Party	Christensen I–II	

=== Ministers under Frederik VIII (1906–1912) ===
No.	Portrait	Name (born–died)	Term of office			Political party	Government	Ref.
No.	Portrait	Name (born–died)	Took office	Left office	Time in office	Political party	Government	Ref.
25		Klaus Berntsen (1844–1927)	12 October 1908	28 October 1909	1 year, 16 days	Venstre Reform Party	Neergaard I Holstein-Ledreborg	
26		Peter Rochegune Munch (1870–1948)	28 October 1909	5 July 1910	250 days	Social Liberal	Zahle I	
27		Jens Jensen-Sønderup (1862–1949)	5 July 1910	21 June 1913	2 years, 351 days	Venstre	Berntsen	

=== Ministers under Christian X (1912–1947) ===
No.	Portrait	Name (born–died)	Term of office			Political party	Government	Ref.
No.	Portrait	Name (born–died)	Took office	Left office	Time in office	Political party	Government	Ref.
28		Ove Rode (1867–1933)	21 June 1913	30 March 1920	6 years, 283 days	Social Liberal	Zahle II	
29		Waldemar Oxholm (1868–1945)	30 March 1920	5 April 1920	6 days	Independent	Liebe	
30		Henrik Vedel (1867–1932)	5 April 1920	5 May 1920	30 days	Independent	Friis	
(24)		Sigurd Berg (1868–1921)	5 May 1920	11 July 1921 #	1 year, 67 days	Venstre	Neergaard II	
31		Oluf Christian Krag (1870–1942)	18 July 1921	23 April 1924	2 years, 287 days	Venstre	Neergaard II–III	
32		Christen Nielsen Hauge (1870–1940)	23 April 1924	14 December 1926	2 years, 235 days	Social Democrats	Stauning I	
(31)		Oluf Christian Krag (1870–1942)	14 December 1926	30 April 1929	2 years, 137 days	Venstre	Madsen-Mygdal	
33		Bertel Dahlgaard (1887–1972)	30 April 1929	8 July 1940	11 years, 69 days	Social Liberal	Stauning II–III–IV–V	
34		Knud Kristensen (1880–1962)	8 July 1940	29 August 1943	2 years, 93 days	Venstre	Stauning VI; Buhl I	
35		Jørgen Jørgensen (1888–1974)	9 November 1942	29 August 1943	324 days	Social Liberal	Scavenius	
No Danish government in between August 29, 1943 and May 5, 1945. Office is assumed by the permanent secretary. (Note: On 29 August 1943, the Danish government resigned, refusing to grant further concessions to Nazi Germany. All government operations were assumed by the permanent secretaries of the individual departments, and this arrangement lasted until the Liberation of Denmark on 5 May 1945. Since King Christian X never accepted the resignation of the government, it existed de jure until a new cabinet was formed on 5 May 1945.)
(34)		Knud Kristensen (1880–1962)	5 May 1945	7 November 1945	186 days	Venstre	Buhl II	
36		Ejnar Martin Kjær (1893–1947)	7 November 1945	18 June 1947 #	2 years, 6 days	Venstre	Kristensen	

=== Ministers under Frederik IX (1947–1972) ===
No.	Portrait	Name (born–died)	Term of office			Political party	Government	Ref.
No.	Portrait	Name (born–died)	Took office	Left office	Time in office	Political party	Government	Ref.
37		Niels Arnth-Jensen (1883–1966)	30 June 1947	13 November 1947	136 days	Venstre	Kristensen	
38		Alsing Emanuel Andersen (1893–1962)	13 November 1947	23 November 1947	10 days	Social Democrats	Hedtoft I	
39		Jens Smørum (1891–1976)	23 November 1947	30 October 1950	2 years, 341 days	Social Democrats	Hedtoft I–II	
Minister of the Interior and Housing (Indenrigs- og boligminister)
40		Aksel Møller (1906–1958)	30 October 1950	30 September 1953	2 years, 335 days	Conservative People's Party	Eriksen	
41		Johannes Kjærbøl (1885–1973)	30 September 1953	30 August 1955	1 year, 334 days	Social Democrats	Hedtoft III; Hansen I	
Minister of the Interior (Indenrigsminister)
42		Carl Petersen (1894–1984)	30 August 1955	28 May 1957	1 year, 271 days	Social Democrats	Hansen I	
43		Søren Olesen (1891–1973)	28 May 1957	18 November 1960	3 years, 174 days	Justice Party	Hansen II; Kampmann I	
44		Hans R. Knudsen (1903–1962)	18 November 1960	7 September 1961	293 days	Social Democrats	Kampmann II	
45		Lars P. Jensen (1909–1986)	7 September 1961	26 September 1964	4 years, 179 days	Social Democrat	Kampmann II; Krag I	
46		Hans Erling Hækkerup (1907–1974)	26 September 1964	2 February 1968	3 years, 129 days	Social Democrats	Krag II	
47		Poul Sørensen (1904–1969)	2 February 1968	29 June 1969 #	1 year, 147 days	Conservative People's Party	Baunsgaard	
48		Hans Carl Toft (1914–2001)	11 July 1969	11 October 1971	2 years, 92 days	Conservative People's Party	Baunsgaard	
49		Egon Jensen (1922–1985)	11 October 1971	19 December 1973	2 years, 69 days	Social Democrats	Krag III; Jørgensen I	

=== Ministers under Margrethe II (1972–2024) ===
No.	Portrait	Name (born–died)	Term of office			Political party	Government	Ref.
No.	Portrait	Name (born–died)	Took office	Left office	Time in office	Political party	Government	Ref.
Minister of the Interior (Indenrigsminister)
50		Jacob Sørensen (1915–1990)	19 December 1973	13 February 1975	1 year, 56 days	Venstre	Hartling	
(49)		Egon Jensen (1922–1985)	13 February 1975	30 August 1978	3 years, 198 days	Social Democrats	Jørgensen II	
51		Knud Enggaard (1929–2024)	30 August 1978	26 October 1979	1 year, 57 days	Venstre	Jørgensen III	
52		Henning Rasmussen (1926–1997)	26 October 1979	10 September 1982	2 years, 319 days	Social Democrats	Jørgensen IV–V	
53		Britta Schall Holberg (1941–2022)	10 September 1982	12 March 1986	3 years, 183 days	Venstre	Schlüter I	
(51)		Knud Enggaard (1929–2024)	12 March 1986	10 September 1987	1 year, 182 days	Venstre	Schlüter I	
54		Thor Pedersen (born 1945)	10 September 1987	25 January 1993	5 years, 137 days	Venstre	Schlüter II–III–IV	
55		Birte Weiss (1941–2026)	25 January 1993	20 October 1997	4 years, 268 days	Social Democrats	P. N. Rasmussen I–II–III	
56		Thorkild Simonsen (1926–2022)	20 October 1997	23 February 2000	2 years, 126 days	Social Democrats	P. N. Rasmussen III–IV	
57		Karen Jespersen (born 1947)	23 February 2000	27 November 2001	1 year, 277 days	Social Democrats	P. N. Rasmussen IV	
Minister of the Interior and Health (Indenrigs- og sundhedsminister)
58		Lars Løkke Rasmussen (born 1964)	27 November 2001	23 November 2007	5 years, 361 days	Venstre	A. F. Rasmussen I–II	
Dismantled, role placed within the Ministry of Social Affairs
Minister of the Interior and Social Affairs (Indenrigs- og socialminister)
59		Karen Ellemann (born 1969)	7 April 2009	23 February 2010	322 days	Venstre	L. L. Rasmussen I	
Minister of the Interior and Health (Indenrigs- og sundhedsminister)
60		Bertel Haarder (born 1944)	23 February 2010	3 October 2011	1 year, 222 days	Venstre	L. L. Rasmussen I	
Ministry of Economy and the Interior (Økonomi- og Indenrigsministeriet)
61		Margrethe Vestager (born 1968)	3 October 2011	2 September 2014	2 years, 334 days	Social Liberal	Thorning-Schmidt I–II	
62		Morten Østergaard (born 1976)	2 September 2014	28 June 2015	299 days	Social Liberal	Thorning-Schmidt II	
Ministry of Social Affairs and the Interior (Social- og Indenrigsministeriet)
(59)		Karen Ellemann (born 1969)	28 June 2015	28 November 2016	1 year, 153 days	Venstre	L. L. Rasmussen II	
Ministry of Economy and the Interior (Økonomi- og Indenrigsministeriet)
63		Simon Emil Ammitzbøll-Bille (born 1977)	28 November 2016	27 June 2019	2 years, 211 days	Liberal Alliance	L.L. Rasmussen III	
Minister of Social Affairs and the Interior (Social- og indenrigsminister)
64		Astrid Krag (born 1982)	27 June 2019	21 January 2021	1 year, 208 days	Social Democrats	Frederiksen I	
Minister for Housing and Interior (Indenrigs- og boligminister)
65		Kaare Dybvad (born 1984)	21 January 2021	2 May 2022	1 year, 101 days	Social Democrats	Frederiksen I	
66		Christian Rabjerg Madsen (born 1986)	2 May 2022	15 December 2022	227 days	Social Democrats	Frederiksen I	
Minister of the Interior and Health (Indenrigs- og sundhedsminister)
67		Sophie Løhde (born 1983)	15 December 2022	3 June 2026	3 years, 170 days	Venstre	Frederiksen II	

=== Ministers under Frederik X (2024–present) ===
No.	Portrait	Name (born–died)	Term of office			Political party	Government	Ref.
No.	Portrait	Name (born–died)	Took office	Left office	Time in office	Political party	Government	Ref.
Minister of Economic Affairs and the Interior (Økonomi- og indenrigsminister)
68		Pia Olsen Dyhr (born 1971)	3 June 2026	Incumbent	143 days	Green Left	Frederiksen III	
