= Scavenius Cabinet =

Danish government from 1942 to 1945

Scavenius
- 41st Cabinet of Denmark

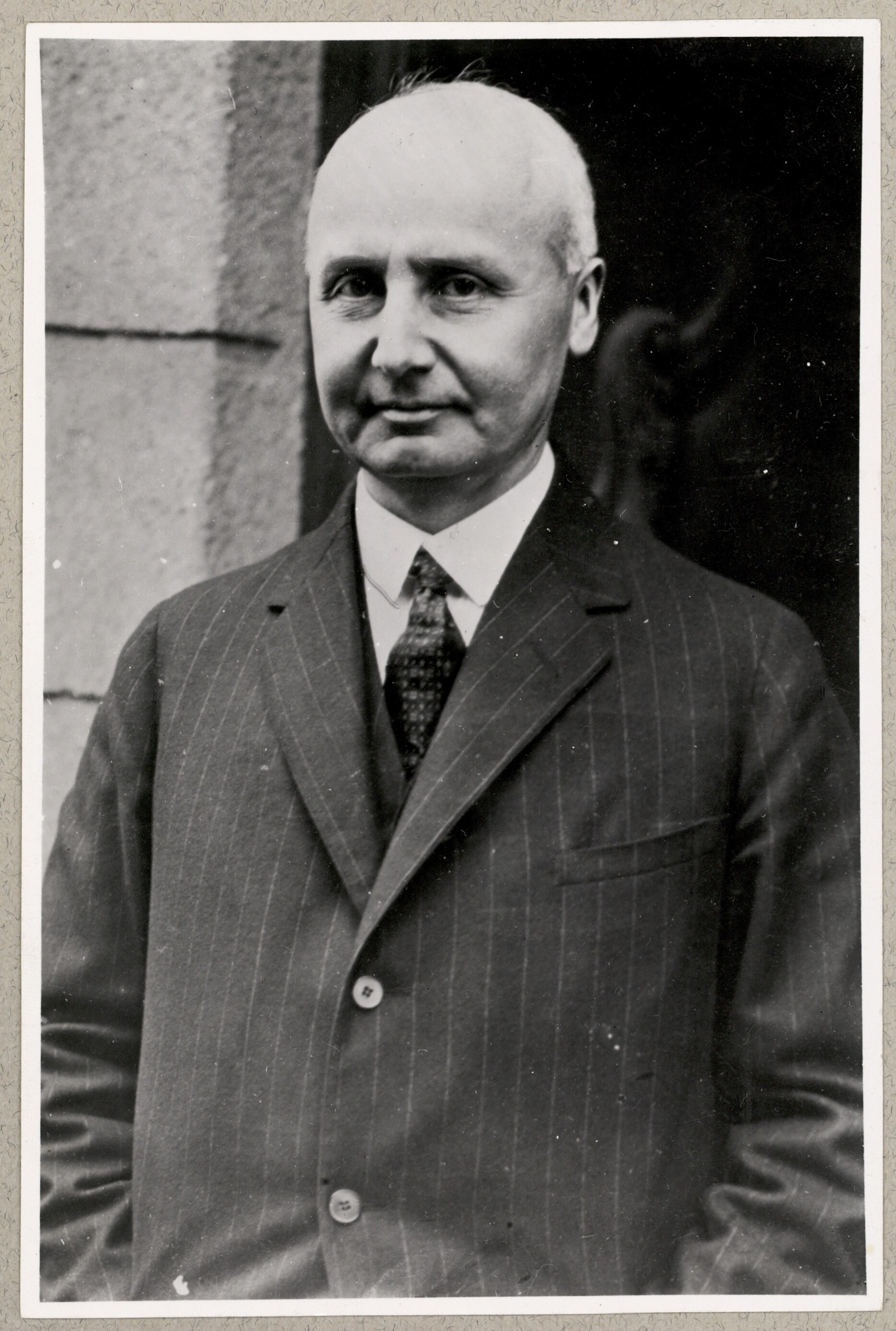
- Date formed: 9 November 1942
- Date dissolved: 5 May 1945

People and organisations
- Head of state: Christian X of Denmark
- Head of government: Erik Scavenius
- Status in legislature: Unity government

History
- Predecessor: Buhl I
- Successor: Buhl II

The Scavenius cabinet was the government of Denmark from 9 November 1942 to 5 May 1945. It replaced the first Buhl cabinet, which collapsed due to the Telegram Crisis in November 1942, when the Germans demanded changes to the Danish government. The Germans wanted nonpolitical ministers and Nazi ministers in the new government, however, only the first demand was met.

Following the August Rebellion in 1943, the Germans put forward more demands, which the Danish authorities refused. The government therefore filed a resignation request for the King on 29 August 1943, who refused to accept it. The government de facto ceased to function, though still formally in power. The Board of Permanent Secretaries was established, where the permanent secretaries of the ministries managed the country. Only after the liberation of 5 May 1945, were the resignation accepted, and the Scavenius cabinet and Board of permanent secretaries were replaced by the second Buhl cabinet.

== List of ministers and portfolios ==
Cabinet members
Portfolio	Minister	Took office	Left office	Party	Ref
Prime Minister & Minister of Foreign Affairs	Erik Scavenius	9 November 1942	5 May 1945	Independent	
Minister of Finance	Kristian Hansen Kofoed	9 November 1942	5 May 1945	Independent	
Minister of Defence	Søren Brorsen	9 November 1942	5 May 1945	Venstre	
Minister of Ecclesiastical Affairs	Valdemar Holbøll	9 November 1942	5 May 1945	Independent	
Minister of Education	A.C. Højberg Christensen	9 November 1942	5 May 1945	Independent	
Minister of Justice	Eigil Thune Jacobsen	9 July 1941	5 May 1945	Independent	
Minister of the Interior	Jørgen Jørgensen	9 November 1942	5 May 1945	Social Liberals	
Minister of Public Works	Axel Gunnar Larsen	9 November 1942	5 May 1945	Independent	
Minister of Traffic	Niels Elgaard	9 November 1942	5 May 1945	Venstre	
Minister of Agriculture and Fisheries	Kristen Bording	9 November 1942	5 May 1945	Social Democrats	
Minister of Industry, Trade, and Seafaring	Halfdan Hendriksen	9 November 1942	5 May 1945	Conservatives	
Minister of Labour	Johannes Kjærbøl	9 November 1942	5 May 1945	Social Democrats	
Ministry of Social Affairs	Laurits Hansen	9 November 1942	5 May 1945	Social Democrats	

Preceded by Buhl I	Cabinet of Denmark; 9 November 1942 − 5 May 1945	Succeeded by Buhl II
