= Minister of Seafaring (Denmark) =

Former government ministerial office

- Minister for søfart
- State coat of arms of the Kingdom of Denmark

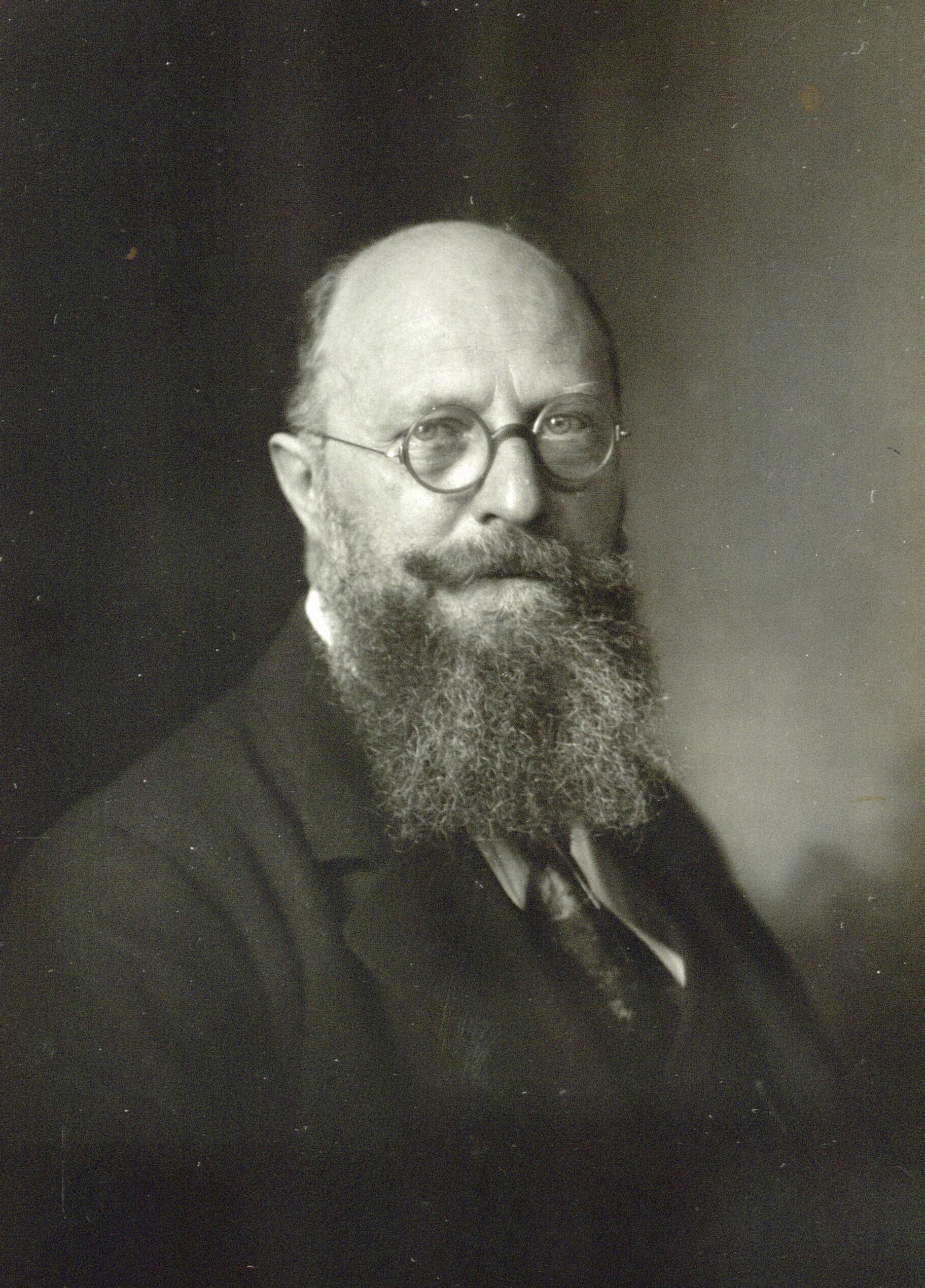
- Longest serving Thorvald Stauning; 23 April 1924–14 December 1926; 30 April 1929–31 May 1933
- Type: Minister
- Member of: Cabinet; State Council
- Reports to: the Prime minister
- Seat: Slotsholmen
- Appointer: The Monarch (on the advice of the Prime Minister)
- Formation: 12 October 1908; 117 years ago
- First holder: Johan Hansen
- Final holder: Arne Christiansen
- Abolished: 26 October 1979; 46 years ago
- Succession: depending on the order in the State Council
- Deputy: Permanent Secretary

Minister of Seafaring (Danish: Minister for søfart) was a Danish Government ministerial office. The office was introduced with the first cabinet of Niels Neergaard on 12 October 1908. The position was connected with the Minister of Commerce throughout its history, apart from 1929 to 1935, where it was connected with Minister of Fisheries.

== List of ministers ==
No.	Portrait	Name (born–died)	Term of office			Political party	Cabinet	Ref.
No.	Portrait	Name (born–died)	Took office	Left office	Time in office	Political party	Cabinet	Ref.
Minister for Commerce and Seafaring (Minister for Handel og Søfart)
1		Johan Hansen (1861–1943)	12 October 1908	28 October 1909	1 year, 16 days	Venstre Reform Party	Neergaard I Holstein-Ledreborg	
2		Wilhelm Weimann (1868–1942)	28 October 1909	5 July 1910	250 days	Social Liberal	Zahle I	
3		Oscar B. Muus (1847–1918)	5 July 1910	21 June 1913	2 years, 351 days	Venstre	Berntsen	
4		Jens Hassing-Jørgensen (1872–1952)	21 June 1913	1 April 1914	311 days	Social Liberal	Zahle II	
Minister for Industry, Commerce and Seafaring (Minister for industri, handel og søfart)
5		Thorvald Stauning (1873–1942)	23 April 1924	14 December 1926	2 years, 235 days	Social Democrats	Stauning I	
6		Marius Slebsager (1874–1962)	14 December 1926	3 October 1928	1 year, 294 days	Venstre	Madsen-Mygdal	
–		Thomas Madsen-Mygdal (1876–1943) acting	3 October 1928	6 October 1928	3 days	Venstre	Madsen-Mygdal	
–		Johannes Stensballe (1874–1956) acting	6 October 1928	30 April 1929	206 days	Venstre	Madsen-Mygdal	
Minister for Seafaring and Fisheries (Minister for søfart og fiskeri)
(5)		Thorvald Stauning (1873–1942)	30 April 1929	31 May 1933	4 years, 31 days	Social Democrats	Stauning II	
–		Christen Nielsen Hauge (1870–1940) acting	31 May 1933	4 November 1935	2 years, 157 days	Social Democrats	Stauning II	
Minister for Industry, Commerce and Seafaring (Minister for industri, handel og søfart)
7		Johannes Kjærbøl (1885–1973)	4 November 1935	8 July 1940	4 years, 247 days	Social Democrats	Stauning III–IV–V	
8		John Christmas Møller (1894–1948)	8 July 1940	3 October 1940	87 days	Conservative People's Party	Stauning VI	
9		Halfdan Hendriksen (1881–1962)	3 October 1940	5 May 1945	4 years, 214 days	Conservative People's Party	Stauning VI; Buhl I Scavenius	
10		Vilhelm Fibiger (1886–1978)	5 May 1945	7 November 1945	186 days	Conservative People's Party	Buhl II	
11		Jens Villemoes (1880–1956)	7 November 1945	6 September 1947	1 year, 303 days	Venstre	Kristensen	
12		Axel Kristensen (1895–1971)	6 September 1947	13 November 1947	68 days	Venstre	Kristensen	
13		Jens Otto Krag (1914–1978)	13 November 1947	16 September 1950	2 years, 307 days	Social Democrats	Hedtoft I	
14		Hans Christian Hansen (1906–1960)	16 September 1950	30 October 1950	44 days	Social Democrats	Hedtoft I–II	
15		Ove Weikop (1897–1986)	30 October 1950	13 September 1951	318 days	Conservative People's Party	Eriksen	
16		Aage L. Rytter (1900–1961)	13 September 1951	30 September 1953	2 years, 17 days	Conservative People's Party	Eriksen	
17		Lis Groes (1910–1974)	30 September 1953	28 May 1957	3 years, 240 days	Social Democrats	Hedtoft III; Hansen I	
Minister for Commerce, Crafts, Industry and Seafaring (Minister for handel, håndværk, industri og søfart)
18		Kjeld Philip (1912–1989)	28 May 1957	31 March 1960	2 years, 308 days	Social Liberal	Hansen II; Kampmann I	
19		Lars P. Jensen (1909–1986)	31 March 1960	7 September 1961	1 year, 160 days	Social Democrats	Kampmann I–II	
20		Hilmar Baunsgaard (1920–1989)	7 September 1961	26 September 1964	3 years, 19 days	Social Liberal	Kampmann II; Krag I	
(19)		Lars P. Jensen (1909–1986)	26 September 1964	21 September 1966	1 year, 360 days	Social Democrats	Krag II	
21		Tyge Dahlgaard (1921–1985)	21 September 1966	1 Oktober 1967	1 year, 10 days	Social Democrats	Krag II	
22		Ove Hansen (1909–1997)	1 October 1967	2 February 1968	124 days	Social Democrats	Krag II	
23		Knud Thomsen (1908–1996)	2 February 1968	11 October 1971	3 years, 251 days	Conservative People's Party	Baunsgaard	
24		Erling Jensen (1919–2000)	11 October 1971	6 December 1973	2 years, 56 days	Social Democrats	Krag III; Jørgensen I	
25		Poul Nyboe Andersen (1913–2004)	6 December 1973	29 January 1975	1 year, 54 days	Venstre	Hartling	
(24)		Erling Jensen (1919–2000)	29 January 1975	8 September 1976	1 year, 223 days	Social Democrats	Jørgensen II	
26		Per Hækkerup (1915–1979)	8 September 1976	26 February 1977	171 days	Social Democrats	Jørgensen II	
27		Ivar Nørgaard (1922–2011)	26 February 1977	30 August 1978	1 year, 185 days	Social Democrats	Jørgensen II	
28		Arne Christiansen (1925–2007)	26 February 1977	26 October 1979	2 years, 242 days	Venstre	Jørgensen III	
