= Stauning VI Cabinet =

Danish government from 1940 to 1942

6th Stauning Cabinet
- 39th Cabinet of Denmark

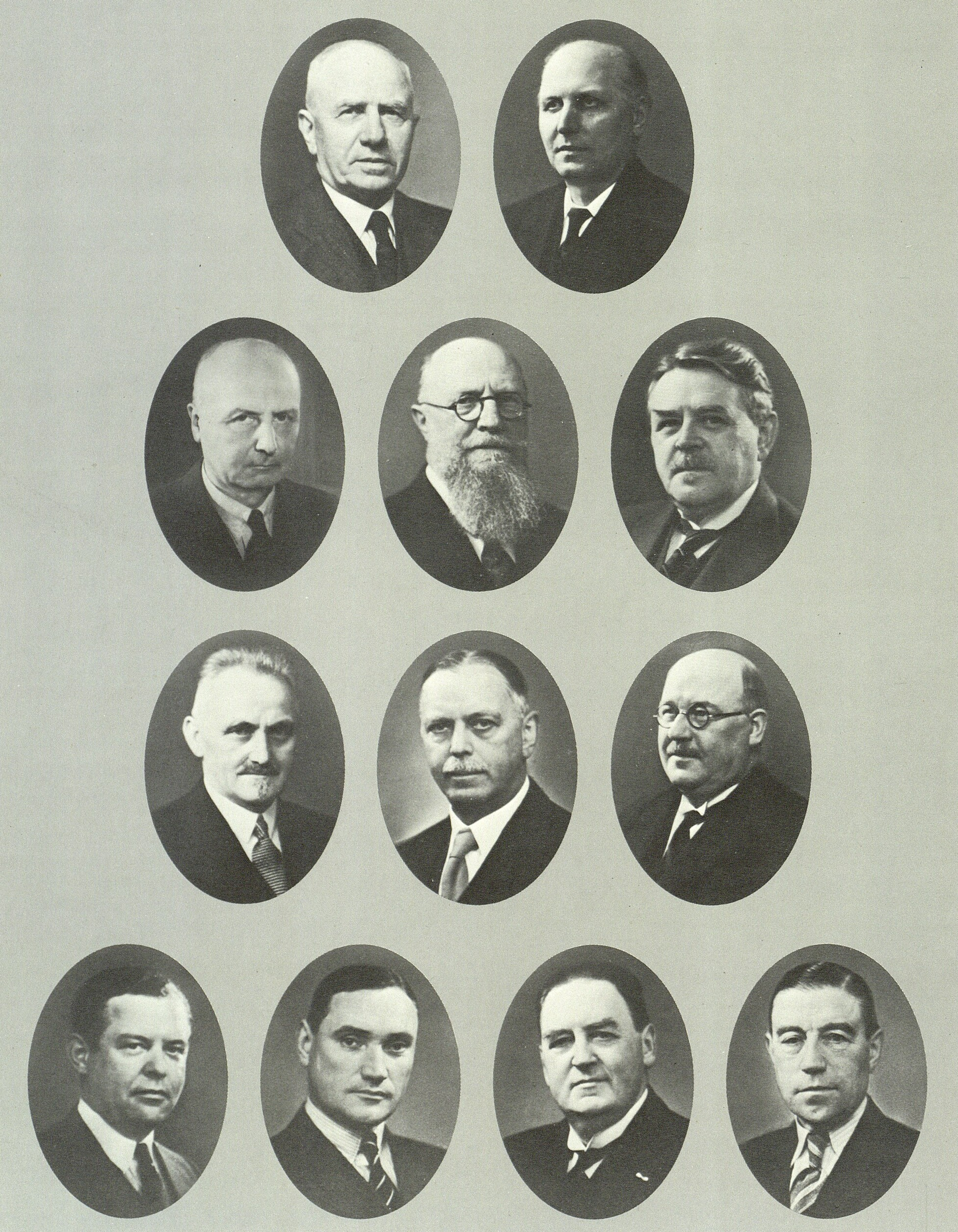
- Date formed: 8 July 1940
- Date dissolved: 4 May 1942

People and organisations
- Head of state: Christian X
- Head of government: Thorvald Stauning
- No. of ministers: 12
- Ministers removed: 3
- Total no. of members: 14
- Member party: Social Democrats; Venstre; Conservative People's Party; Social Liberal Party
- Status in legislature: Unity government

History
- Legislature term: 1939–1943
- Predecessor: Stauning V
- Successor: Buhl I

The Sixth Stauning cabinet was the government of Denmark from 8 July 1940, to 4 May 1942.

== List of ministers ==
Some periods in the table below start before 8 July 1940 or end after 4 May 1942 because the minister was in the Fifth Stauning Cabinet or the First Buhl Cabinet as well.

The cabinet consisted of:

Cabinet members
Portfolio	Minister	Took office	Left office	Party
Prime Minister	Thorvald Stauning	30 April 1929	3 May 1942†	Social Democrats
Minister of Foreign Affairs	Erik Scavenius	8 July 1940	29 August 1943	Independent
Minister for Finance	Vilhelm Buhl	20 July 1937	16 July 1942	Social Democrats
Minister of Defence	Søren Brorsen	4 May 1942	29 August 1943	Venstre
Minister for Ecclesiastical Affairs	Vilhelm Fibiger	8 July 1940	9 November 1942	Conservatives
Minister for Education	Jørgen Jørgensen	4 November 1935	9 November 1942	Social Liberals
Minister of Justice	Harald Petersen	8 July 1940	9 July 1941	Independent
Minister of Justice	Eigil Thune Jacobsen	9 July 1941	29 August 1943	Independent
Minister of the Interior	Knud Kristensen	8 July 1940	9 November 1942	Venstre
Minister of Public Works	Gunnar Larsen	8 July 1940	29 August 1943	Independent
Minister Agriculture and Fisheries	Kristen Bording	4 November 1935	29 August 1943	Social Democrats
Minister for Industry, Trade and Seafaring	John Christmas Møller	8 July 1940	3 October 1940	Conservatives
Minister for Industry, Trade and Seafaring	Halfdan Hendriksen	3 October 1940	5 May 1945	Conservatives
Ministry of Social Affairs	Johannes Kjærbøl	8 July 1940	9 November 1942	Social Democrats

Preceded by Stauning V	Cabinet of Denmark; 1940-1942	Succeeded by Buhl I
