= Egon Jensen (politician) =

Danish politician (1922–1985)

Minister of Church
- In office 30 August 1978 – 26 October 1979
- Prime Minister: Anker Jørgensen

Minister of Interior
- In office 13 February 1975 – 30 August 1978
- Prime Minister: Anker Jørgensen

Minister of Interior
- In office 11 October 1971 – 19 December 1973
- Prime Minister: Jens Otto Krag

Personal details
- Born: Egon Carlo Larsen Jensen; 14 March 1922 Slagelse, Denmark
- Died: 4 February 1985 (aged 62) Copenhagen, Denmark
- Party: Social Democrats

Egon Jensen (1922–1985) was a Danish politician from the Social Democrats. He was a long-term member of the Parliament and served as minister of interior and minister of Church in the 1970s.

== Early life and education ==
Jensen was born in Slagelse on 14 March 1922. He graduated from a high school in 1937. He attended the business school between 1938 and 1941.

== Career ==
Jensen was the chair of the Social Democratic Youth of Denmark in his hometown from 1937 to 1945. In 1954 he became a member of the Slagelse city council and remained in office until 1971. He was the deputy mayor of Slagelse between 1966 and 1970 and the mayor from February to April 1970. Jensen was elected to the Parliament for the Social Democrats in 1960 and served there until 1985. He was also a member of the European Parliament between November 1979 and 1985 taking part in the committee on regional planning and local authorities.

Jensen was first appointed minister of interior on 11 October 1971 and was part of the cabinet led by Prime Minister Jens Otto Krag. His tenure ended on 19 December 1973. He was again named as the minister of interior on 13 February 1975 which he held until 30 August 1978. Jensen was the minister of Church between 30 August 1978 and 26 October 1979. The cabinets were led by the Prime Minister Anker Jørgensen.

== Personal life and dead ==
Jensen married Henny Jørgensen on 1 June 1946. He died on 4 February 1985 while attending a session at the Parliament.
