= Nørre Farup =

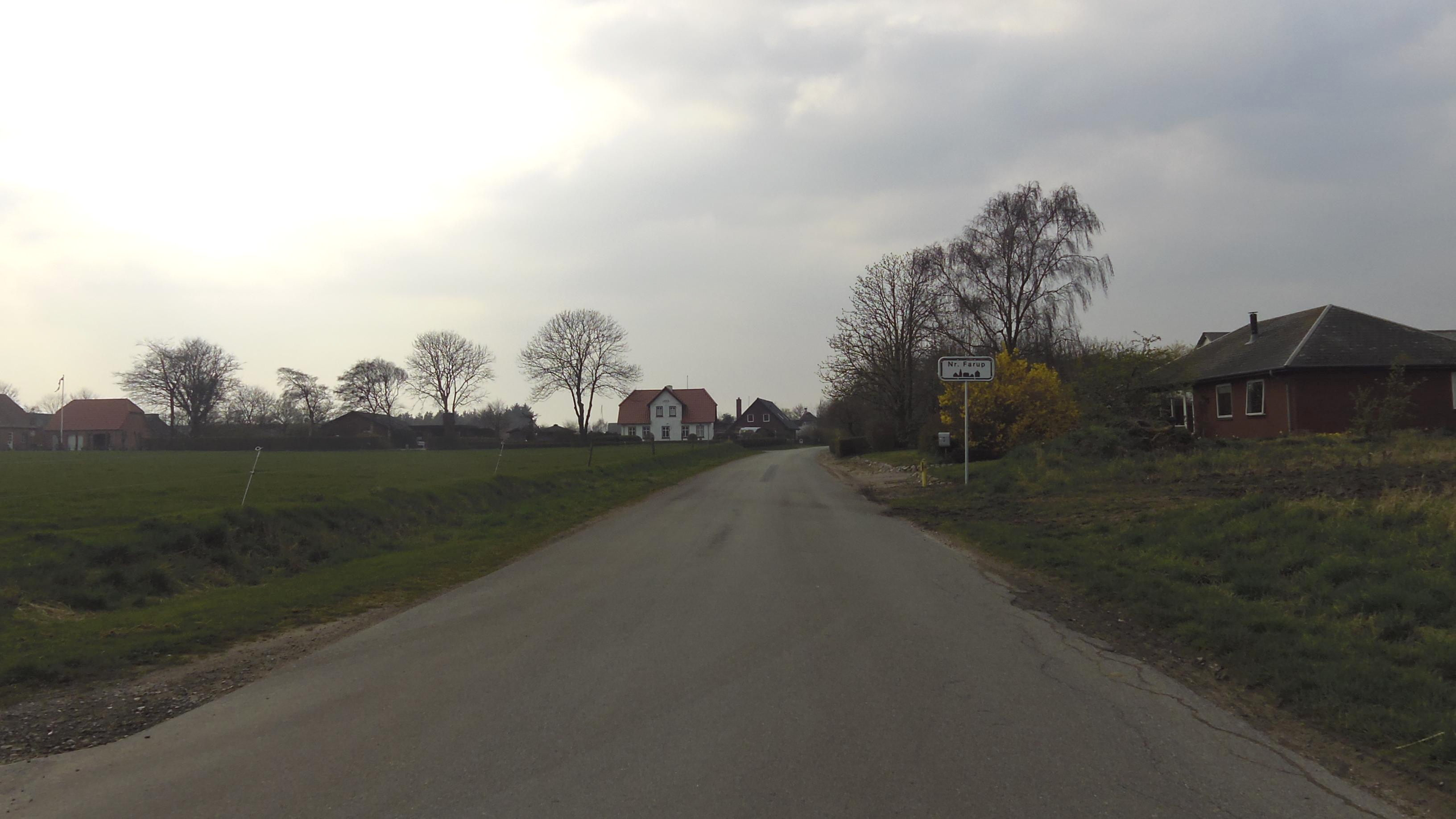
- Western entrance to the village

- Nørre Farup, Denmark
- Coordinates: 55.354444°N 8.733056°E
- Country: Denmark
- Region: Southern Denmark (Syddanmark)
- Municipality: Esbjerg
- Time zone: UTC+1 (Central Europe Time)
  - Summer (DST): UTC+2
- Postal code: 6760

Nørre Farup is a village on the peninsula of Jutland. It is a part of Esbjerg Municipality in the Region of Southern Denmark.

== History ==
=== Name ===
The first particle far- is believed to be an Old Norse word which meant “ferry [station]”, and the last particle -rup is derived from the Old Danish word thorp, which meant “secondary settlement”.

The name Nørre Farup (Norfarthrop; Northern Farup) is known from 1352, about the same time that the village Lille Farup (Lillæfarthorp) on the opposite side of Ribe River acquired the name Sønder Farup (Synderfarthorp; Southern Farup), but the name Nørre Farup does not seem generally used until the 1800s. On a cadastral map from 1868 the village is yet mentioned as Farup (Fardrup) in Nørre Farup Parish (Nørre Fardrup Sogn), on a cadastral map from 1887 as Farup (Fardrup) in Farup Parish (Farup Sogn), and first on a cadastral map from 1907 as Nørre Farup in Farup Parish.

=== Early history ===
The parish Farup (Fardrup) is known from 1045, but the village Farup (Fartorp) is known first from the second half of the 1200s.

=== Modern history ===
January 14, 1814, a Cossack, who was patrolling in Nørre Farup after foreign troops invaded Denmark in the Napoleonic Wars, was murdered there. The local Hans Hansen Bundesen admitted during questioning that he shot the Cossack in the back and the back of the head because the Cossack with his lance threatened him and his father, and both were therefore taken to Haderslev. What since happened to them is, however, not known.

Since the Middle Ages there were in the Duchies of Schleswig and Holstein several enclaves, i.e. farms or villages, which were owned by the Danish Monarchy. If a farm or village was owned by the Danish Monarchy, the laws and regulations of the Danish Monarchy applied, while the regulations of the Duchies applied for the other areas. In Nørre Farup some of the village was part of Riberhus Judicial District, which was of the Danish Monarchy, and other was part of Kalvslund Hundred, which was of the Duchy of Schleswig. On April 1, 1867, however, the whole village became a part of Ribe Hundred.

== Geography ==
Nørre Farup lies on the geest-edge, i.e. the border between marsh and geest, and has preserved the distinct character of circular village around a village green, clearly defined against the surrounding landscape.

== Notable people from Nørre Farup ==
- Søren Brorsen (1875-1961), politician.
