= Buhl II Cabinet =

Danish government cabinet in 1945

Second Buhl cabinet
- 42nd Cabinet of Denmark

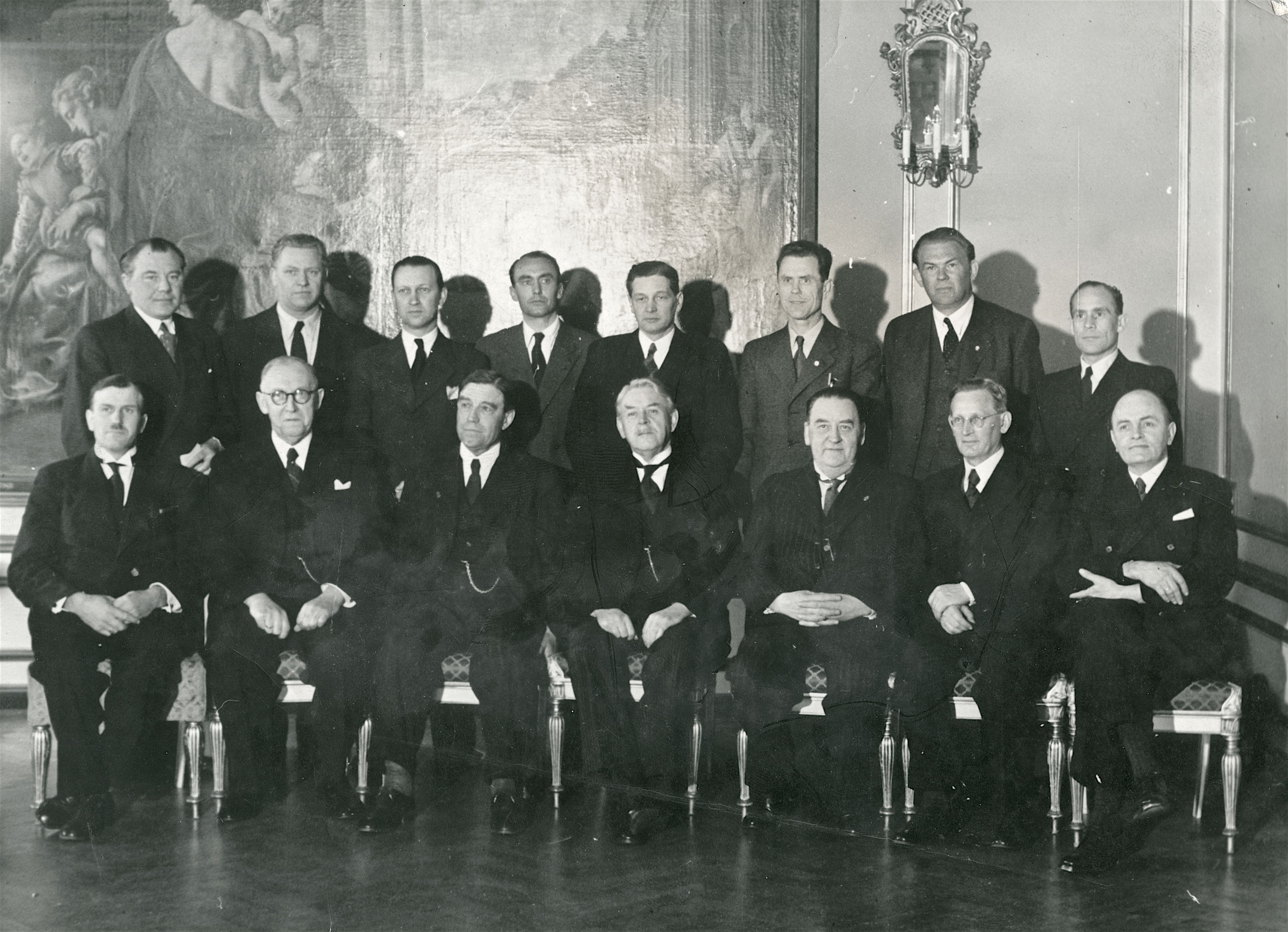
- Cabinet, without Kristen Juul Christensen and John Christmas Møller
- Date formed: 5 May 1945
- Date dissolved: 7 November 1945

People and organisations
- Monarch: Christian X
- Prime Minister: Vilhelm Buhl
- Prime Minister's history: Buhl I
- Total no. of members: 18
- Member parties: Social Democrats; Venstre; Conservative People's Party; Danish Unity; Social Liberal Party; Communist Party of Denmark
- Status in legislature: Unity government

History
- Election: None
- Outgoing election: 1945
- Incoming formation: German surrender in Denmark
- Predecessor: Scavenius
- Successor: Kristensen

The Second cabinet of Vilhelm Buhl, also popularly known as the Liberation Cabinet (Danish: Befrielsesregeringen), was the government of Denmark from 5 May to 7 November 1945. It got its alternative name because it was the first government after the liberation from the Nazi German occupation during World War II.

It comprised 18 ministers, about evenly split between the former Danish unity government, and members of the Frihedsrådet and other resistance groups.

== List of ministers ==
The cabinet consisted of:

Cabinet members
Portfolio	Minister	Took office	Left office	Party
Prime Minister	Vilhelm Buhl	5 May 1945	7 November 1945	Social Democrats
Minister of Foreign Affairs	Vilhelm Buhl (act.)	5 May 1945	7 May 1945	Social Democrats
Minister of Foreign Affairs	John Christmas Møller	7 May 1945	7 November 1945	Conservatives
Minister for Finance	Hans Christian Svane Hansen	5 May 1945	7 November 1945	Social Democrats
Minister of the Interior	Knud Kristensen	5 May 1945	7 November 1945	Venstre
Minister of Justice	Niels Busch-Jensen	5 May 1945	7 November 1945	Social Democrats
Minister for Education	Axel Marius Hansen	5 May 1945	7 November 1945	Social Liberals
Minister for Ecclesiastical Affairs	Arne Sørensen	5 May 1945	7 November 1945	Danish Unity
Minister of Defence	Ole Bjørn Kraft	5 May 1945	7 November 1945	Conservatives
Minister for Public Works	Carl Petersen	5 May 1945	7 November 1945	Social Democrats
Minister for Labor and Social Affairs	Hans Christian Hedtoft Hansen	5 May 1945	7 November 1945	Social Democrats
Minister for Traffic	Alfred Jensen	5 May 1945	7 November 1945	Communists
Minister for Agriculture and Fisheries	Erik Eriksen	5 May 1945	7 November 1945	Venstre
Minister of Industry, Trade, and Seafaring	Vilhelm Fibiger	5 May 1945	7 November 1945	Conservatives
Minister for Special Affairs	Mogens Fog	5 May 1945	7 November 1945	Communists
Minister without Portfolio	Aksel Larsen	5 May 1945	7 November 1945	Communists
Minister without Portfolio	Kristen Juul Christensen	5 May 1945	7 November 1945	Danish Unity
Minister without Portfolio	Frode Jakobsen	5 May 1945	7 November 1945	Social Democrats
Minister without Portfolio	Henrik Kauffmann	12 May 1945	7 November 1945	Independent

Preceded by Scavenius	Cabinet of Denmark; 1945	Succeeded by Kristensen
