= Britta Schall Holberg =

Danish politician (1941–2022)

Member of the Folketing
- In office 8 February 2005 – 15 September 2011
- In office 10 January 1984 – 9 May 1988

Minister for Agriculture
- In office 12 March 1986 – 10 September 1987
- Preceded by: Niels Anker Kofoed
- Succeeded by: Laurits Tørnæs

Minister of the Interior
- In office 10 September 1982 – 12 March 1986
- Preceded by: Henning Rasmussen
- Succeeded by: Knud Enggaard

Personal details
- Born: Britta Schall Caroc Holberg; 25 July 1941 Glumsø, German-occupied Denmark
- Died: 23 February 2022 (aged 80)
- Party: Venstre

Britta Schall Caroc Holberg (25 July 1941 – 23 February 2022) was a Danish politician. A member of the Venstre party, she served as Minister of the Interior from 1982 to 1986, Minister for Agriculture from 1986 to 1987, and was a member of the Folketing from 1984 to 1988 and again from 2005 to 2011. She died on 23 February 2022, at the age of 80.
