= Enevold Sørensen =

Danish editor, politician and minister

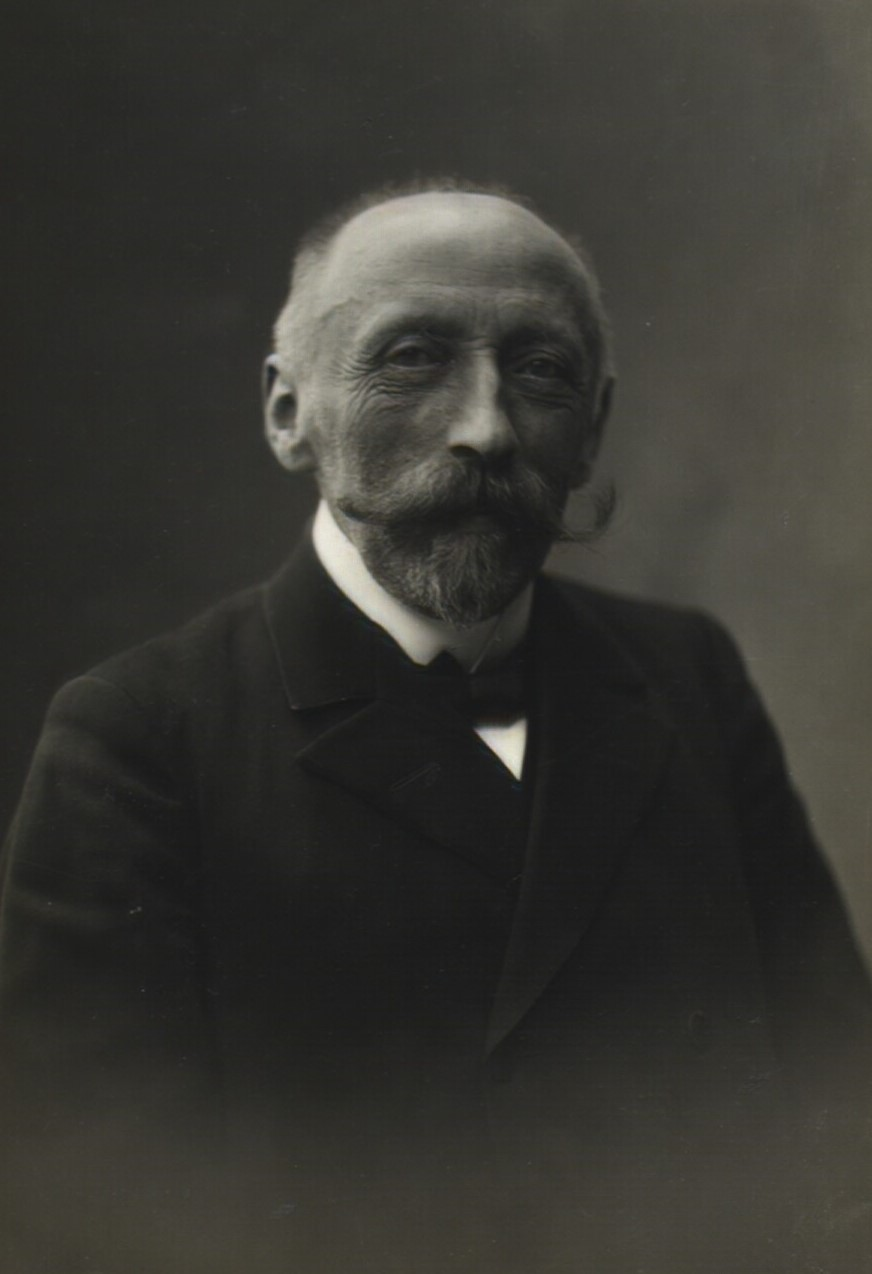
Enevold Sørensen

Enevold Frederik Adolf Sørensen (21 September 1850 – 1 February 1920) was a Danish journalist and politician who served as Minister of the Interior from 1901 to 1905 and then Kultus Minister until 1909.

He was interior minister in the Cabinet of Deuntzer and kultus minister in the Cabinet of J.C. Christensen I and II, the Cabinet of Neergaard I and the Cabinet of Holstein-Ledreborg as a member of the Venstre Reform Party. As interior minister he instituted an extensive tax reform.

From 1910 to 1918 he was one of the king's appointed members of the Landsting.

Political offices
Preceded by Ludvig Ernst Bramsen	Minister of the Interior; 24 July 1901 – 14 January 1905	Succeeded by Sigurd Berg
Preceded by Jens Christian Christensen	Kultus Minister; 14 January 1905 – 28 October 1909	Succeeded by Michael Cosmus Bornemann Nielsen
