= Lis Groes =

Pioneering Danish female politician

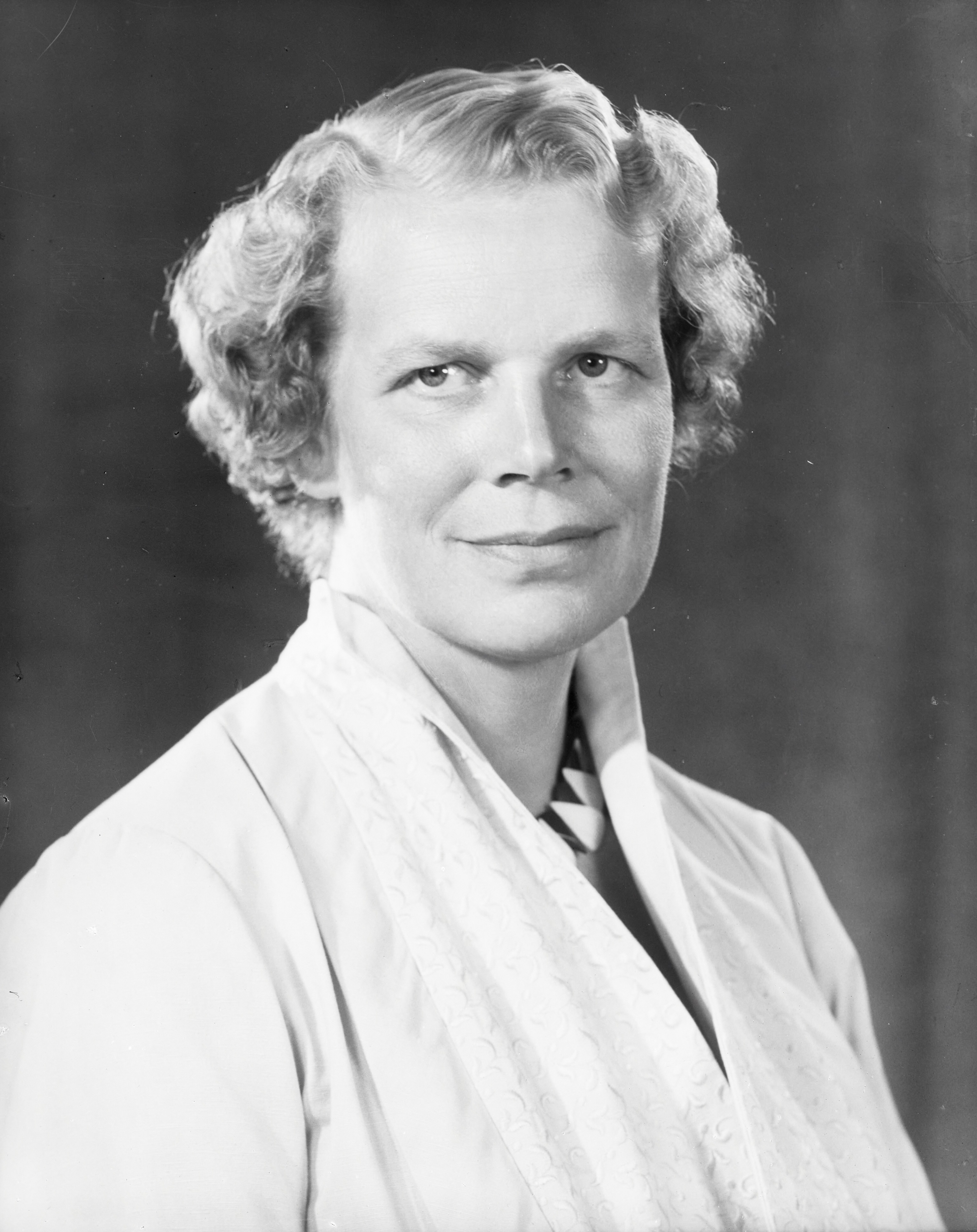
Lis Groes

Anne Lisbeth Groes, generally known as Lis Groes, (1910–1974) was a pioneering woman in post-war Danish social-democratic politics. The fifth woman to hold a ministerial post in Denmark, she was the first to become Minister for Trade and Industry (1953–1957). Active in campaigning for women's rights, she headed the Danish Women's Society (Dansk Kvindesamfund) from 1958 to 1964.

== Biography ==
Born in Copenhagen on 2 November 1910, Anne Lisbeth Tørsleff was the daughter of the educator Signe Andrea Tørsleff and the university lecturer P. Madsen Lindegaard. At Haderslev Katedralskole in southern Jutland, where her mother was principal, she was active in the students' association. When she was 18, she won the Politiken' contest in public speaking. The prize for this was a trip to Washington, D.C. There, representing one of the 19 countries present, she was the only woman to address the audience of 4,000.

While studying political science at Copenhagen University, she was an active member of the students' association. In 1931, she became the first woman to head the organization's steering committee. On graduating as "cand.polit" in 1935, she joined the Disablement Insurance Court. In 1936, she married her student colleague Ebbe Groes, and concentrated on raising a family of the nine children she had over the next 14 years.

During the Second World War, she became president of the Danish Women's Society's youth circle, joining the central committee in 1943. After the war, she helped develop a new programme of work for the organization. In a speech titled Kvindesagens Maal (Objective of the Women's Movement), which she presented to the Nordic Women's Congress in 1946, she argued in favour of more respect for a woman's contribution to the family. She also fought for improved relations between working women and housewives.

From 1953 to 1957, Groes was Minister of Trade and Industry. In particular, she developed the Bill on Monopolies and Pricing Agreements which was adopted in 1955. In 1958, she became a key proponent of progress on women and consumer issues. From 1958 to 1964, she was president of the Women's Society where she handled both domestic and international issues, including the development of women's rights in Greenland. She was also a member of the Folketing from 1960 to 1971.

Lis Groes died in Copenhagen on 12 March 1974, and is buried in Mariebjerg Cemetery in Gentofte.
