= Buhl I Cabinet =

Danish government cabinet in 1942

1st Buhl Cabinet
- 40th Cabinet of Denmark

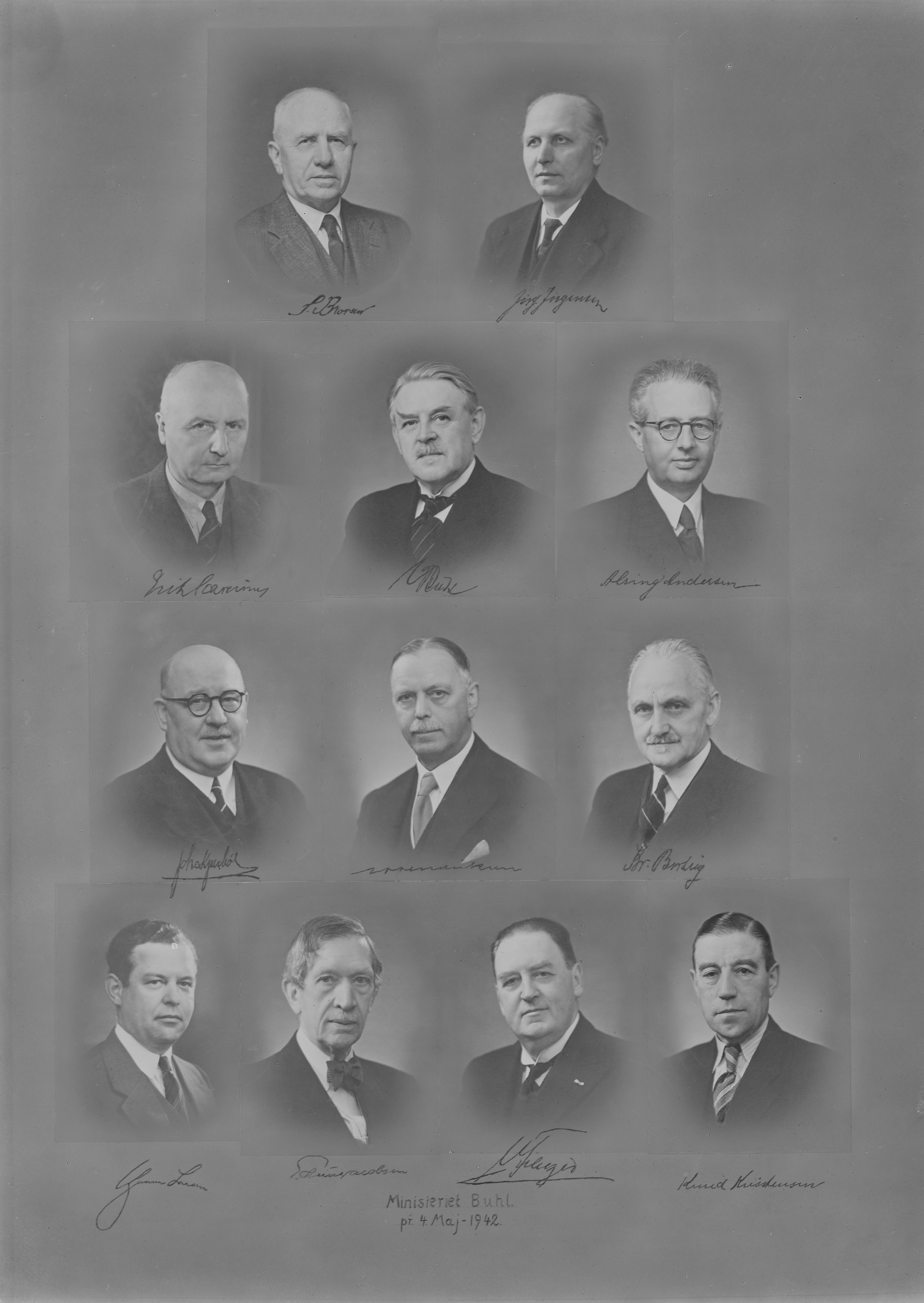
- Date formed: 4 May 1942
- Date dissolved: 9 November 1942

People and organisations
- Head of state: Christian X
- Head of government: Vilhelm Buhl
- Total no. of members: 13
- Member party: Social Democrats; Venstre; Conservative People's Party; Social Liberal Party
- Status in legislature: Unity government

History
- Legislature term: 1939–1943
- Predecessor: Stauning VI
- Successor: Scavenius

The First Buhl cabinet was the government of Denmark from 4 May 1942 to 9 November 1942. It was created following the death of Prime Minister Thorvald Stauning.

== List of ministers ==
Some periods in the table below start before 8 July 1940 or end after 4 May 1942 because the minister was in the Sixth Stauning Cabinet or the Scavenius Cabinet as well.

The cabinet consisted of:

Cabinet members
| Portfolio | Minister | Took office | Left office | Party |
|---|---|---|---|---|
| Prime Minister | Vilhelm Buhl | 4 May 1942 | 9 November 1942 | Social Democrats |
| Minister of Foreign Affairs | Erik Scavenius | 8 July 1940 | 29 August 1943 | Independent |
| Minister for Finance | Vilhelm Buhl | 20 July 1937 | 16 July 1942 | Social Democrats |
| Minister for Finance | Alsing Andersen | 16 July 1942 | 9 November 1942 | Social Democrats |
| Minister of Defence | Søren Brorsen | 4 May 1942 | 29 August 1943 | Venstre |
| Minister for Ecclesiastical Affairs | Vilhelm Fibiger | 8 July 1940 | 9 November 1942 | Conservatives |
| Minister for Education | Jørgen Jørgensen | 4 November 1935 | 9 November 1942 | Social Liberals |
| Minister of Justice | Eigil Thune Jacobsen | 9 July 1941 | 29 August 1943 | Independent |
| Minister of the Interior | Knud Kristensen | 8 July 1940 | 9 November 1942 | Venstre |
| Minister of Public Works | Gunnar Larsen | 8 July 1940 | 29 August 1943 | Independent |
| Minister for Agriculture and Fisheries | Kristen Bording | 4 November 1935 | 29 August 1943 | Social Democrats |
| Minister of Industry, Trade and Seafaring | Halfdan Hendriksen | 3 October 1940 | 5 May 1945 | Conservatives |
| Ministry of Social Affairs | Johannes Kjærbøl | 8 July 1940 | 9 November 1942 | Social Democrats |

| Preceded by Stauning VI | Cabinet of Denmark; 1940-1942 | Succeeded by Scavenius |
