= Anders Nielsen (politician) =

Danish politician (1862–1914)

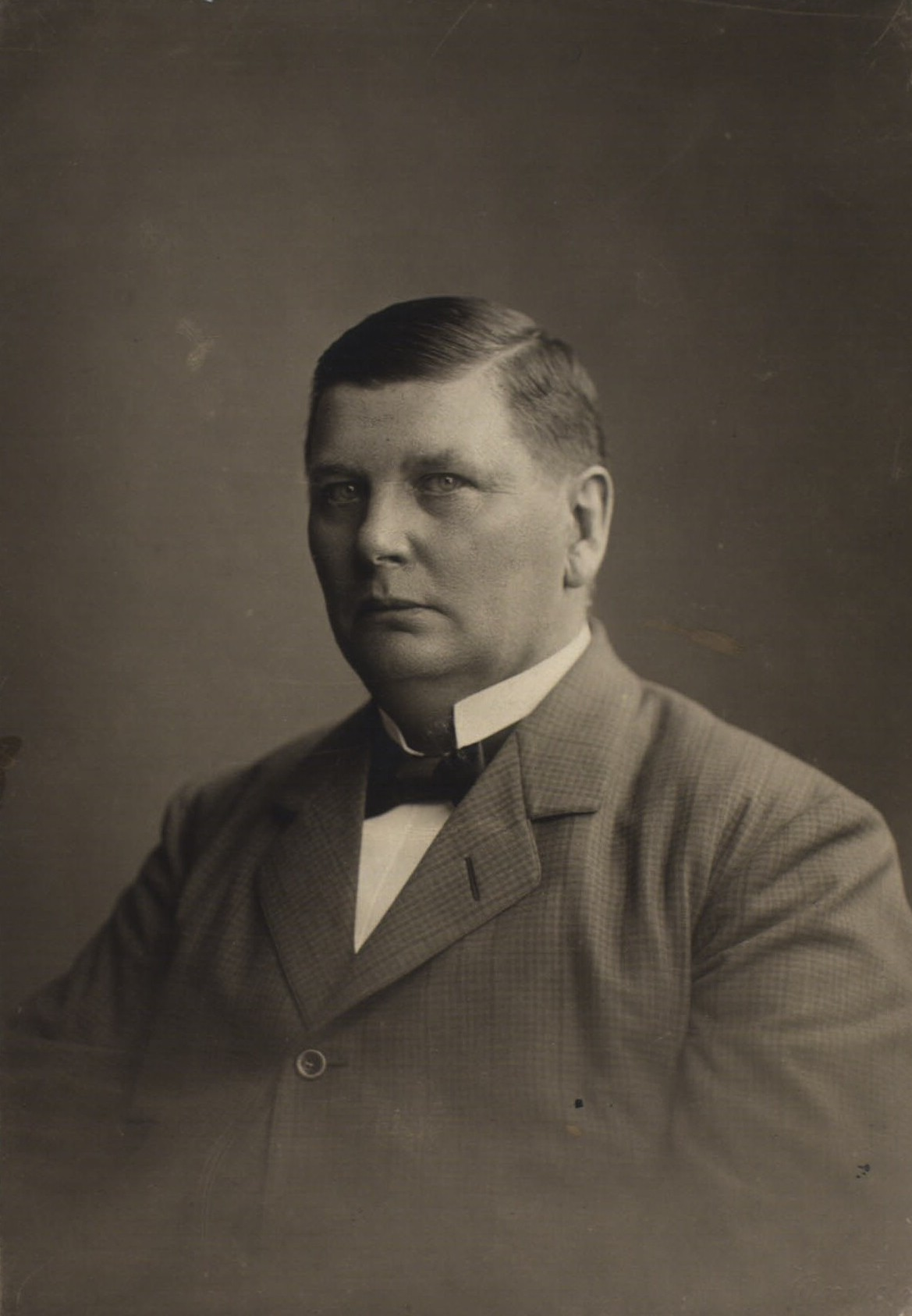
- Anders Nielsen

Minister for Agriculture
- In office 24 July 1908 – 28 October 1909
- Prime Minister: Jens Christian Christensen; Niels Neergaard; Ludvig Holstein-Ledreborg
- Preceded by: Ole Hansen
- Succeeded by: Poul Christensen
- In office 5 July 1910 – 21 June 1913
- Prime Minister: Klaus Berntsen
- Preceded by: Poul Christensen
- Succeeded by: Kristjan Pedersen

Personal details
- Born: 30 May 1862 Denmark
- Died: 13 June 1914 (aged 52)
- Party: Venstre
- Occupation: Farmer, editor, politician
- Known for: Agricultural policy; service in Danish governments under Neergaard, Holstein-Ledreborg, and Berntsen

Anders Nielsen (30 May 1862 – 13 June 1914) was a Danish farmer, editor, politician, and Minister for Agriculture. He was elected for Venstre, and served as minister from 1908 to 1909 in the governments of both Niels Neergaard and Ludvig Holstein-Ledreborg, and again in the Klaus Berntsen government from 1910 to 1913.

== Sources ==
- Minister for Agriculture profile
- "Salmonsens konversationsleksikon" (2nd Edition), Volume XVII: Mielck—Nordland, 1924, p.921, "Nielsen, Anders"
- Gyldendals Åbne Encyklopædi entry
