= Knud Enggaard =

Danish politician (1929–2024)

Knud Enggaard (4 June 1929 – 11 April 2024) was a Danish politician representing the centre-right Venstre party. He served as a Member of Parliament from 1984 to 1998, and held numerous cabinet positions in the Danish government. He served as Minister of the Interior from 1978 to 1979, as Minister of Energy from 1982 to 1986, as Minister of the Interior from 1986 to 1987, as Minister of Economy from 1987 to 1988, as Minister of Defence from 1988 to 1992 and as Minister of Defence and Nordic Cooperation from 1992 to 1993. He was also President of the Nordic Council in 1976, 1981 and 1996. He was chairman of the Danish section of Foreningen Norden from 2000 to 2003.

Enggaard became a Commander First Class of the Order of the Dannebrog in 1992. He died on 11 April 2024, at the age of 94.
