= Søren Brorsen =

Danish politician (1875–1961)

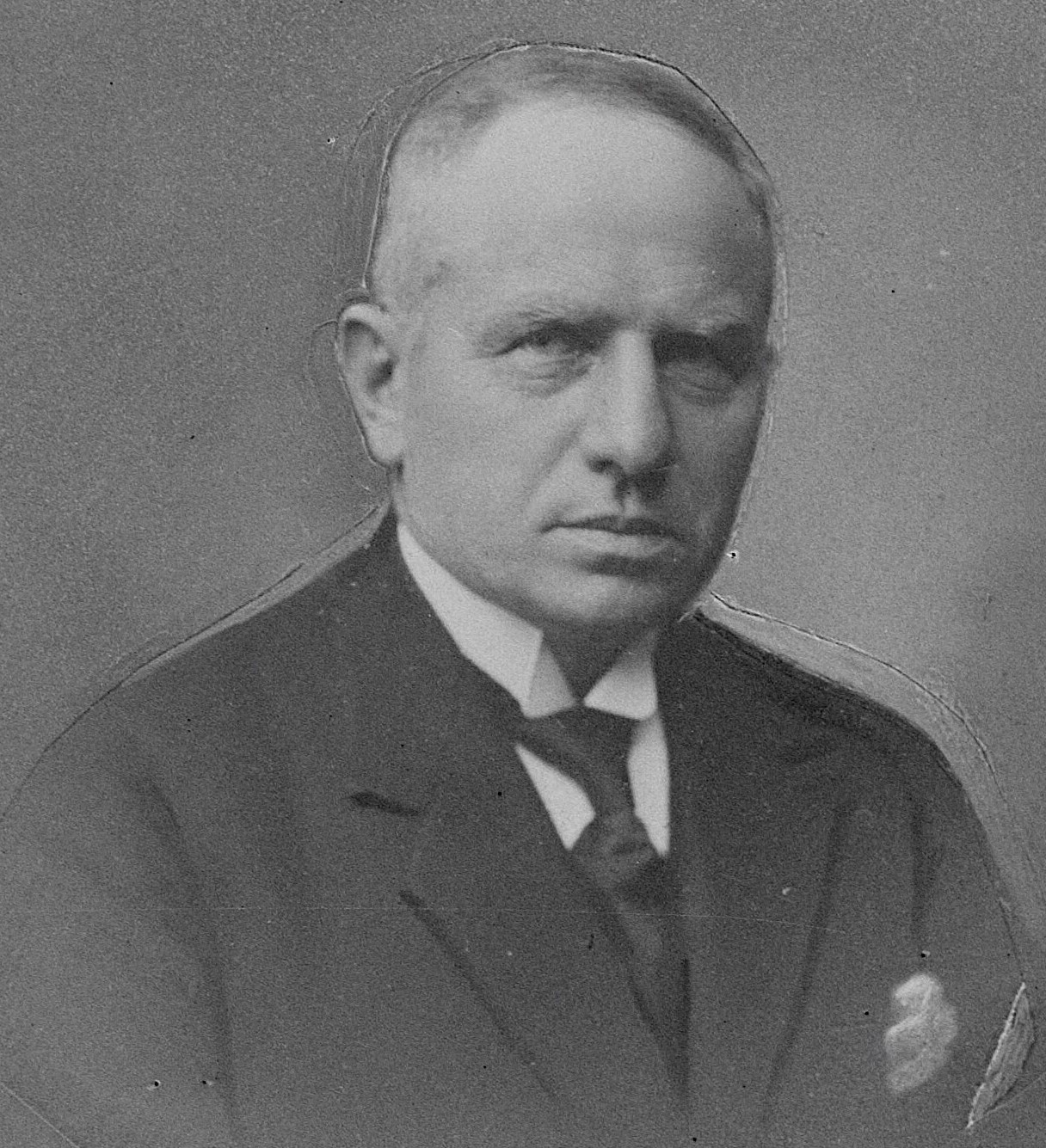
Søren Brorsen

Søren Brorsen (1875–1961) was a Danish politician who was a member of Venstre. He was the minister of defence for three terms in the periods of 1922–1924, 1926–1929 and 1940–1943.

== Biography ==
Brorsen was born in Nørre Farup on 1 July 1875. He was owner of a farm and a member of the Parliament for Venstre between 1907 and 1929 and again between 1932 and 1945.

Brorsen served as minister of defense for three terms. He was first appointed to the post in 1922 and was in office until 1924. His second term as minister of justice was for three years from 1926 to 1929. He was again appointed minister of defense on 8 July 1940 three months after the invasion of Denmark by Nazi Germany. Although he was one of the ardent critics of Nazis who disliked him, Brorsen remained in office until 29 August 1943 when the Nazi's military rule took over the ministry. Brorsen died Copenhagen on 17 February 1961.
