= Cabinet of Denmark =

Chief executive body of Denmark

Government of the Kingdom of Denmark
- Central government
- Lesser coat of arms of Denmark

Overview
- Established: 5 June 1848; 178 years ago
- State: Kingdom of Denmark
- Leader: Prime Minister (Statsminister)
- Appointed by: The Monarch
- Main organ: Prime Minister's Office
- Ministries: List
- Responsible to: Folketing
- Headquarters: Slotsholmen, Copenhagen
- Website: www.regeringen.dk

The Cabinet of Denmark (Danish: regering), officially the Government of the Kingdom of Denmark (Danish: Kongeriget Danmarks regering), is the national cabinet of the Kingdom of Denmark. It has been the chief executive body and the government of the Danish Realm—Denmark proper together with the Faroe Islands and Greenland — since the ratification of the Constitution of Denmark in 1848.

The Cabinet is led by the Prime Minister. There are around 25 members of the Cabinet, known as "ministers", all of whom are also heads of specific government ministries. The Cabinet has usually been composed of Ministers from two or more parties forming a coalition government. Still, most of these governments have been minority governments, relying on the support of still other parties.

Cabinets are formally appointed by the Monarch. In practice, once a government has stepped down, there is a fixed set of rules for appointing an investigator (most often the future Prime Minister), with the job of trying to form a new government. The Prime Minister will lead the Cabinet by convention. Cabinets are named after the Prime Minister, although they may gain shorthand names (e.g. "VK Cabinet", for the recent Venstre–Conservative cabinet).

As of 3 June 2026, the Prime Minister is Mette Frederiksen, leading a coalition government led by the Social Democratic Party with Venstre, the Moderates and the Social Liberals, supported by the Red–Green Alliance and The Alternative.

== List of Cabinets ==
Below is a list of all Cabinets since 1848.

No.	Cabinet	From	To	Time in office	Parties	Supporting parties (Note: Excluding Greenlandic and Faroese parties.)	Popular name
1	Moltke I Cabinet	22 March 1848	16 November 1848	239 days	Ministers outside the parties National Venstre; Bondevennerne		March Cabinet
2	Moltke II Cabinet	16 November 1848	13 July 1851	2 years, 239 days	Ministers outside the parties National Venstre		November Cabinet
3	Moltke III Cabinet	13 July 1851	18 October 1851	97 days	—		July Cabinet
4	Moltke IV Cabinet	18 October 1851	27 January 1852	101 days	—		October Cabinet
5	Bluhme I Cabinet	27 January 1852	21 April 1853	1 year, 84 days	—		January Cabinet
6	Ørsted Cabinet	21 April 1853	12 December 1854	1 year, 235 days	—		—
7	Bang Cabinet	12 December 1854	18 October 1856	1 year, 311 days	—		—
8	Andræ Cabinet	18 October 1856	13 May 1857	207 days	—		—
9	Hall I Cabinet	13 May 1857	2 December 1859	2 years, 203 days	—		—
10	Rotwitt Cabinet	2 December 1859	24 February 1860	84 days	—		—
11	Hall II Cabinet	24 February 1860	31 December 1863	3 years, 310 days	—		—
12	Monrad Cabinet	31 December 1863	11 July 1864	193 days	—		—
13	Bluhme II Cabinet	11 July 1864	6 November 1865	1 year, 118 days	—		—
14	Frijs Cabinet	6 November 1865	28 May 1870	4 years, 203 days	—		—
15	Holstein-Holsteinborg Cabinet	28 May 1870	14 July 1874	4 years, 50 days	—		—
16	Fonnesbech Cabinet	14 July 1874	11 June 1875	329 days	—		—
17	Estrup Cabinet	11 June 1875	7 August 1894	19 years, 57 days	Højre		—
18	Reedtz-Thott Cabinet	7 August 1894	23 May 1897	2 years, 289 days	Højre		—
19	Hørring Cabinet	23 May 1897	27 April 1900	2 years, 339 days	Højre		—
20	Sehested Cabinet	27 April 1900	24 July 1901	1 year, 88 days	Højre		—
21	Deuntzer Cabinet	24 July 1901	14 January 1905	3 years, 174 days	Venstre		—
22	Christensen I Cabinet	14 January 1905	24 July 1908	3 years, 192 days	Venstre		—
23	Christensen II Cabinet	24 July 1908	12 October 1908	80 days	Venstre		—
24	Neergaard I Cabinet	12 October 1908	16 August 1909	308 days	Venstre		—
25	Holstein-Ledreborg Cabinet	16 August 1909	28 October 1909	73 days	Venstre		—
26	Zahle I Cabinet	28 October 1909	5 July 1910	250 days	Social Liberal Party	Social Democrats	—
27	Berntsen Cabinet	5 July 1910	21 June 1913	2 years, 351 days	Venstre		—
28	Zahle II Cabinet	21 June 1913	30 March 1920	6 years, 283 days	Social Liberal Party	Social Democrats	—
29	Liebe Cabinet	30 March 1920	5 April 1920	6 days	Caretaker cabinet		—
30	Friis Cabinet	5 April 1920	5 May 1920	30 days	Caretaker cabinet		—
31	Neergaard II Cabinet	5 May 1920	9 October 1922	2 years, 157 days	Venstre		—
32	Neergaard III Cabinet	9 October 1922	23 April 1924	1 year, 197 days	Venstre		—
33	Stauning I Cabinet	23 April 1924	14 December 1926	2 years, 235 days	Social Democrats		—
34	Madsen-Mygdal Cabinet	14 December 1926	30 April 1929	2 years, 137 days	Venstre	Conservative People's Party	—
35	Stauning II Cabinet	30 April 1929	4 November 1935	6 years, 188 days	Social Democrats; Social Liberal Party		Cabinet of Stauning-Munch
36	Stauning III Cabinet	4 November 1935	15 September 1939	3 years, 315 days	Social Democrats; Social Liberal Party		—
37	Stauning IV Cabinet	15 September 1939	10 April 1940	208 days	Social Democrats; Social Liberal Party		—
38	Stauning V Cabinet	10 April 1940	8 July 1940	89 days	Social Democrats; Social Liberal Party		—
39	Stauning VI Cabinet	8 July 1940	4 May 1942	1 year, 300 days	Unity government		—
40	Buhl I Cabinet	4 May 1942	9 November 1942	189 days	Unity government		—
41	Scavenius Cabinet	9 November 1942	5 May 1945	2 years, 177 days	Unity government		—
42	Buhl II Cabinet	5 May 1945	7 November 1945	186 days	Unity government		Liberation Cabinet
43	Kristensen Cabinet	7 November 1945	13 November 1947	2 years, 6 days	Venstre	The Conservative People's Party	—
44	Hedtoft I Cabinet	13 November 1947	16 September 1950	2 years, 307 days	Social Democrats		—
45	Hedtoft II Cabinet	16 September 1950	30 October 1950	44 days	Social Democrats		—
46	Eriksen Cabinet	30 October 1950	30 September 1953	2 years, 335 days	Venstre; Conservative People's Party		—
47	Hedtoft III Cabinet	30 September 1953	1 February 1955	1 year, 124 days	Social Democrats		—
48	Hansen I Cabinet	1 February 1955	28 May 1957	2 years, 116 days	Social Democrats		—
49	Hansen II Cabinet	28 May 1957	21 February 1960	2 years, 269 days	Social Democrats; Social Liberal Party; Justice Party		Triangle Cabinet (Trekantregeringen)
50	Kampmann I Cabinet	21 February 1960	18 November 1960	271 days	Social Democrats; Social Liberal Party; Justice Party		Triangle Cabinet (Trekantregeringen)
51	Kampmann II Cabinet	18 November 1960	3 September 1962	1 year, 289 days	Social Democrats; Social Liberal Party		SR Cabinet
52	Krag I Cabinet	3 September 1962	29 September 1964	2 years, 26 days	Social Democrats; Social Liberal Party		SR Cabinet
53	Krag II Cabinet	29 September 1964	2 February 1968	3 years, 126 days	Social Democrats	Social Liberal Party (1964–1966); Green Left	S Cabinet
54	Baunsgaard Cabinet	2 February 1968	11 October 1971	3 years, 251 days	Social Liberal Party; Conservative People's Party; Venstre	Majority government	VKR Cabinet
55	Krag III Cabinet	11 October 1971	5 October 1972	360 days	Social Democrats	Green Left	S Cabinet
56	Jørgensen I Cabinet	5 October 1972	19 December 1973	1 year, 75 days	Social Democrats	Green Left	S Cabinet
57	Hartling Cabinet	19 December 1973	13 February 1975	1 year, 56 days	Venstre	Social Liberal Party; The Conservative People's Party; Centre Democrats; Christian People's Party	The narrow Venstre Cabinet (den smalle Venstre-regering)
58	Jørgensen II Cabinet	13 February 1975	30 August 1978	3 years, 198 days	Social Democrats	Green Left	S Cabinet
59	Jørgensen III Cabinet	30 August 1978	26 October 1979	1 year, 57 days	Social Democrats; Venstre	Majority government	SV Cabinet
60	Jørgensen IV Cabinet	26 October 1979	30 December 1981	2 years, 65 days	Social Democrats	Green Left	S Cabinet
61	Jørgensen V Cabinet	30 December 1981	10 September 1982	254 days	Social Democrats	Green Left	S Cabinet
62	Schlüter I Cabinet (Note: Officially the first Schlüter cabinet lasted until 1987. However, the cabinet is sometimes split by different political scholars as they generally agree that a general election marks the end of a cabinet.)	10 September 1982	8 September 1987	3 years, 240 days	Conservative People's Party; Venstre; Centre Democrats; Christian Democrats	Progress Party; Social Liberal Party	Four-leaf clover Cabinet (Firkløverregeringen)
63	Schlüter II Cabinet	10 September 1987	3 March 1988	175 days	Conservative People's Party; Venstre; Centre Democrats; Christian Democrats	Progress Party; Social Liberal Party	Four-leaf clover Cabinet (Firkløverregeringen)
64	Schlüter III Cabinet	2 June 1988	11 December 1990	2 years, 192 days	Conservative People's Party; Venstre; Social Liberal Party	Progress Party; Centre Democrats; Christian People's Party	KVR Cabinet
65	Schlüter IV Cabinet	17 December 1990	23 January 1993	2 years, 37 days	Conservative People's Party; Venstre	Progress Party; Centre Democrats; Social Liberal Party; Christian People's Party	KV Cabinet
66	P.N. Rasmussen I Cabinet	25 January 1993	27 September 1994	1 year, 245 days	Social Democrats; Centre Democrats; Social Liberal Party; Christian Democrats	Majority government	Red clover Cabinet (Rødkløverregeringen)
67	P.N. Rasmussen II Cabinet	27 September 1994	30 December 1996	2 years, 94 days	Social Democrats; Social Liberal Party; Centre Democrats	Green Left	—
68	P.N. Rasmussen III Cabinet	30 December 1996	23 March 1998	1 year, 83 days	Social Democrats; Social Liberal Party	Red-Green Alliance; Green Left	SR Cabinet
69	P.N. Rasmussen IV Cabinet	23 March 1998	27 November 2001	3 years, 249 days	Social Democrats; Social Liberal Party	Green Left	SR Cabinet
70	A.F. Rasmussen I Cabinet	27 November 2001	18 February 2005	3 years, 83 days	Venstre; Conservative People's Party	Danish People's Party	VK Cabinet
71	A.F. Rasmussen II Cabinet	18 February 2005	23 November 2007	2 years, 278 days	Venstre; Conservative People's Party	Danish People's Party	VK Cabinet
72	A.F. Rasmussen III Cabinet	23 November 2007	5 April 2009	1 year, 133 days	Venstre; Conservative People's Party	Danish People's Party	VK Cabinet
73	L.L. Rasmussen I Cabinet	5 April 2009	3 October 2011	2 years, 181 days	Venstre; Conservative People's Party	Danish People's Party	VK Cabinet
74	Thorning-Schmidt I Cabinet	3 October 2011	3 February 2014	2 years, 123 days	Social Democrats; Social Liberal Party; Green Left	Red-Green Alliance	SRSF Cabinet
75	Thorning-Schmidt II Cabinet	3 February 2014	28 June 2015	1 year, 145 days	Social Democrats; Social Liberal Party	Red-Green Alliance	SR Cabinet
76	L.L. Rasmussen II Cabinet	28 June 2015	28 November 2016	1 year, 153 days	Venstre	Danish people's Party; Liberal Alliance; Conservative People's Party	V Cabinet
77	L.L. Rasmussen III Cabinet	28 November 2016	27 June 2019	2 years, 211 days	Venstre; Liberal Alliance; Conservative People's Party	Danish People's Party	VLAK Cabinet, Shamrock Cabinet
78	Frederiksen I Cabinet	27 June 2019	15 December 2022	3 years, 171 days	Social Democrats	Social Liberal Party; Green Left; Red-Green Alliance	S Cabinet
79	Frederiksen II Cabinet	15 December 2022	3 June 2026	3 years, 170 days	Social Democrats; Venstre; Moderates	Majority government	SVM Cabinet
80	Frederiksen III Cabinet	3 June 2026	-	163 days	Social Democrats; Green Left; Moderates; Social Liberal Party	Red-Green Alliance; The Alternative	Four-leaf clover Cabinet (Firkløverregeringen)

== See also ==
- List of Danish government ministries
- Council of State, the privy council of Denmark
- Politics of Denmark, for a more detailed description of the political system of Denmark.
