= Council of State (Denmark) =

Privy Council of the Kingdom of Denmark

The Council of State (Danish: Statsrådet, Faroese: Ríkisráðið, Greenlandic: Naalagaaffimmi Siunnersuisoqatigiit) is the privy council of the Kingdom of Denmark. The body of advisors to the Danish monarch, the council is a formal institution, with largely ceremonial functions. Chaired by the monarch, the council comprises all cabinet ministers and the crown prince or princess when coming of age. When unavailable, the monarch is represented by the regent or Lord Protector (Danish: Rigsforstander).

In its beginnings, the council was a place of debate amongst the ministers over government policy. However, since the formation of real political parties at the beginning of the 20th century, these debates were moved from the council to informal ministerial meetings where government policy could be coordinated – usually held every Wednesday. As a result, the primary function of the council today is to grant royal assent, which is done by the counter-signatures of the monarch and a minister. Before granting the assent, a relevant minister explains the general aim of the bill brought before the council. According to section 22 of the Danish constitution, a bill must be granted assent within thirty days of its passing by parliament, at the latest, for it to become an Act. In urgent cases, or if a passed law will be in conflict with this time limit if only signed at the next scheduled council meeting, the responsible minister for the law is also allowed to visit the royal institution at a separate meeting ahead of the scheduled council meeting, and ask for royal assent. The monarch is generally not held politically responsible for any granted Assent as it is customary that they grant it in all circumstances regardless of the Bill's context due to neutrality.

Besides enacting parliamentary bills, as a rule all government bills also have to have formal approval by the monarch and a minister before introduction to parliament. Approval is also given by the council to all of the monarch's official actions as head of state.

Council protocols are secret. Although being a formal part of the legal enactment procedure in Denmark, the royal assent is nowadays only a formality, as the Danish monarch does not directly participate in formal decision-making and is obliged to sign all passed laws at the monthly called Statsråd meetings.

Unlike its British and Canadian counterparts, membership of the council does not carry along with it an entitlement to a special title or form of address.

== The Council and the Constitution ==
Section 17 of the Danish constitution (Danish: Danmarks Riges Grundlov) in broad terms set the rules for the council. Section 18 of the constitution which allows for ministers to hold council meetings without the monarch, a so-called Council of Ministers, is no longer in effect.

Section 17

(1) The body of Ministers shall form the Council of State, in which the Heir to the Throne shall have a seat when of age. The Council of State shall be presided over by the King except in the instance mentioned in section 8, and in instances where the legislature in pursuance of section 9 may have delegated the conduct of government to the Council of State.

(2) All Bills and important government measures shall be discussed in the Council of State.

== From Council Presidium to Prime Minister's Office ==
From 1848 to 1918 the person in charge of the Council’s presidium (Danish: Konseilspræsidiet) wore the title of President of the Council (Danish: Konseilspræsident) and was the de facto prime minister. In 1918 the presidium had formed into a regular cabinet office and was transformed into what today is known as the Ministry of the State of Denmark (Danish: Statsministeriet).

The office consists of the Prime Minister, a secretariat to the Prime Minister and a department headed by a permanent secretary of state. Besides being the office of the PM, it is also the ministry for the press and Greenland and the Faroe Islands.

== See also ==
- Riksråd
