= Minister of Social Affairs (Denmark) =

Danish cabinet position

- Socialminister
- State coat of arms of the Kingdom of Denmark

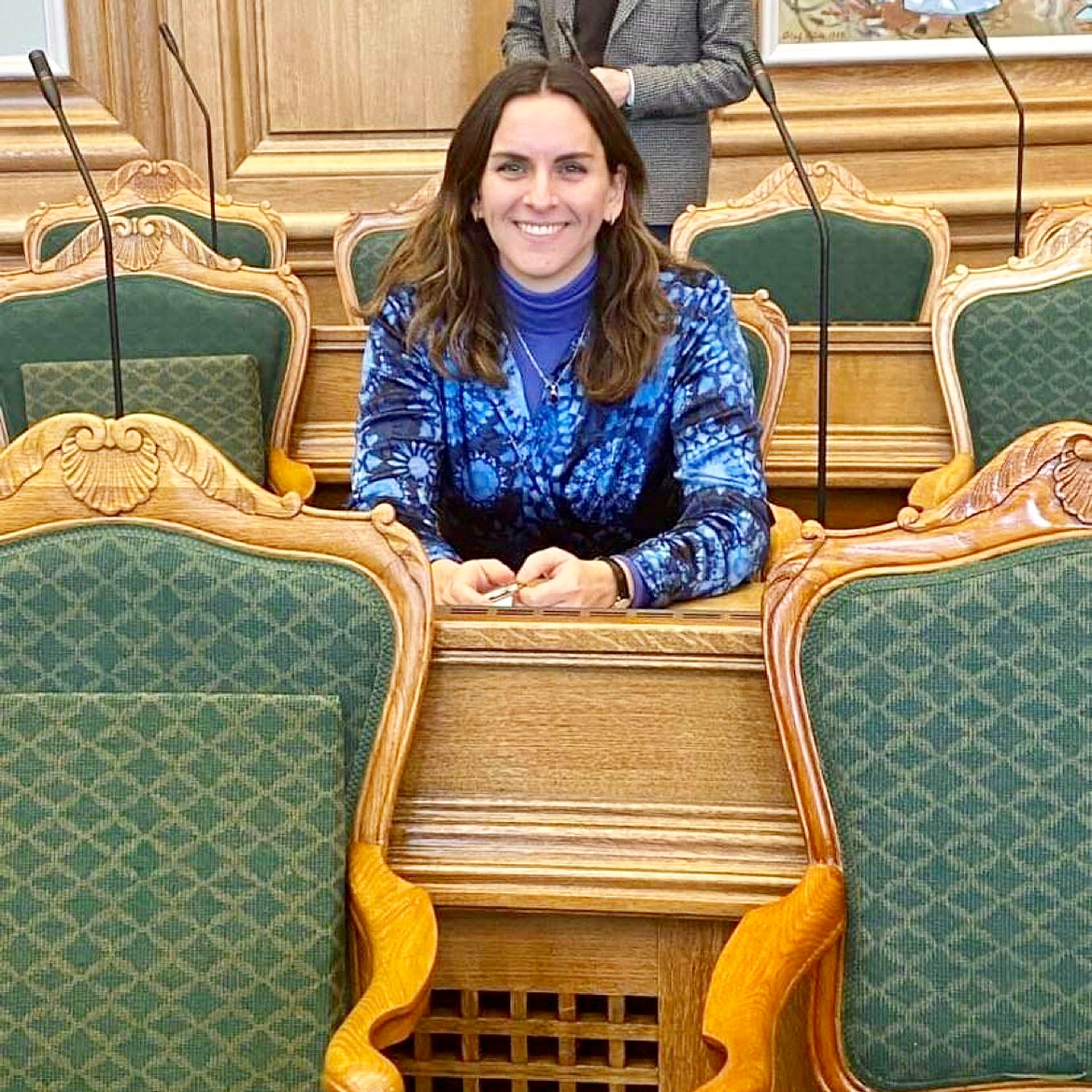
- Incumbent; Monika Rubin since 3 June 2026
- Ministry of Social Affairs
- Type: Minister
- Member of: Cabinet; State Council
- Reports to: the Prime minister
- Seat: Slotsholmen
- Appointer: The Monarch; (on the advice of the Prime Minister)
- Formation: 18 November 1918; 107 years ago
- First holder: Thorvald Stauning
- Succession: depending on the order in the State Council
- Deputy: Permanent Secretary
- Salary: 1.624.503,02 DKK (€217,931), in 2026

The Danish Minister of Social Affairs (Danish: Socialminister), is a minister in the government of Denmark, with overall responsibility for strategy and policy related to disadvantaged children, disability policies, family law often combined with other areas.

== List of ministers ==
| No. | Portrait | Name (born-died) | Term of office | | | Political party | Government | Ref. |
| No. | Portrait | Name (born-died) | Took office | Left office | Time in office | Political party | Government | Ref. |
Minister of Social Affairs (Socialminister)
| 1 | | Thorvald Stauning (1873–1942) | 18 November 1918 | 5 April 1920 | 1 year, 139 days | Social Democrats | Zahle II | |
| 2 | | Jens Jensen (1859–1928) | 5 April 1920 | 5 May 1920 | 30 days | Social Democrats | Friis | |
| 3 | | Frederik Borgbjerg (1866–1936) | 23 April 1924 | 14 December 1926 | 2 years, 235 days | Social Democrats | Stauning I | |
| 4 | | Karl Kristian Steincke (1880–1962) | 30 April 1929 | 4 November 1935 | 6 years, 188 days | Social Democrats | Stauning II | |
| 5 | | Ludvig Christensen (1878–1956) | 5 November 1935 | 8 July 1940 | 4 years, 246 days | Social Democrats | Stauning III–IV–V | |
Minister of Labour and Social Affairs (Arbejds- og socialminister)
| 6 | | Johannes Kjærbøl (1885–1973) | 8 July 1940 | 9 November 1942 | 2 years, 124 days | Social Democrats | Stauning VI; Buhl I | |
Minister of Social Affairs (Socialminister)
| 7 | | Laurits Hansen (1894–1965) | 9 November 1942 | 29 August 1943 | 287 days | Social Democrats | Scavenius | |
No Danish government (29 August 1943 (Note: On 29 August 1943, the Danish government resigned, refusing to grant further concessions to Nazi Germany. All government operations were assumed by the permanent secretaries of the individual departments, and this arrangement lasted until the Liberation of Denmark on 5 May 1945. Since King Christian X never accepted the resignation of the government, it existed de jure until a new cabinet was formed on 5 May 1945.) – 5 May 1945). Office is assumed by the permanent secretary.
Minister of Labour and Social Affairs (Arbejds- og socialminister)
| 8 | | Hans Hedtoft (1903–1955) | 5 May 1945 | 7 November 1945 | 186 days | Social Democrats | Buhl II | |
| 9 | | Søren Peter Larsen (1888–1948) | 7 November 1945 | 24 April 1947 | 1 year, 168 days | Venstre | Kristensen | |
| 10 | | Jens Sønderup (1894–1978) | 24 April 1947 | 13 November 1947 | 203 days | Venstre | Kristensen | |
Minister of Social Affairs (Socialminister)
| 11 | | Johan Strøm (1898–1958) | 13 November 1947 | 30 October 1950 | 2 years, 351 days | Social Democrats | Hedtoft I–II | |
Minister of Labour and Social Affairs (Arbejds- og socialminister)
| 12 | | Poul Sørensen (1904–1969) | 30 October 1950 | 30 September 1953 | 2 years, 335 days | Conservative People's Party | Eriksen | |
| (11) | | Johan Strøm (1898–1958) | 30 September 1953 | 1 November 1953 | 32 days | Social Democrats | Hedtoft III | |
Minister of Social Affairs (Socialminister)
| (11) | | Johan Strøm (1898–1958) | 1 November 1953 | 28 May 1957 | 3 years, 208 days | Social Democrats | Hedtoft III; Hansen I | |
| 13 | | Julius Bomholt (1896–1969) | 28 May 1957 | 7 September 1961 | 4 years, 102 days | Social Democrats | Hansen II; Kampmann I–II | |
| 14 | | Kaj Bundvad (1904–1976) | 7 September 1961 | 3 September 1962 | 361 days | Social Democrats | Kampmann II | |
Minister of Labour and Social Affairs (Arbejds- og socialminister)
| (14) | | Kaj Bundvad (1904–1976) | 3 September 1962 | 27 August 1963 | 358 days | Social Democrats | Krag I | |
Minister of Social Affairs (Socialminister)
| (14) | | Kaj Bundvad (1904–1976) | 27 August 1963 | 2 February 1968 | 5 years, 152 days | Social Democrats | Krag I–II | |
| 15 | | Nathalie Lind (1918–1999) | 2 February 1968 | 11 October 1971 | 3 years, 251 days | Venstre | Baunsgaard | |
| 16 | | Eva Gredal (1927–1995) | 11 October 1971 | 19 December 1973 | 2 years, 69 days | Social Democrats | Krag III; Jørgensen I | |
| 17 | | Jacob Sørensen (1915–1990) | 19 December 1973 | 13 February 1975 | 1 year, 56 days | Venstre | Hartling | |
| (16) | | Eva Gredal (1927–1995) | 13 February 1975 | 30 August 1978 | 3 years, 198 days | Social Democrats | Jørgensen II | |
| 18 | | Erling Jensen (1919–2000) | 30 August 1978 | 26 October 1979 | 1 year, 57 days | Venstre | Jørgensen III | |
| 19 | | Ritt Bjerregaard (1941–2023) | 26 October 1979 | 30 December 1981 | 2 years, 65 days | Social Democrats | Jørgensen IV | |
| 20 | | Bent Hansen (1931–2000) | 30 December 1981 | 27 April 1982 | 118 days | Social Democrats | Jørgensen V | |
| 21 | | Bent Rold Andersen (1929–2015) | 27 April 1982 | 10 September 1982 | 136 days | Social Democrats | Jørgensen V | |
| 22 | | Palle Simonsen (1933–2014) | 10 September 1982 | 23 July 1984 | 1 year, 317 days | Conservative People's Party | Schlüter I | |
| 23 | | Elsebeth Kock-Petersen (born 1949) | 23 July 1984 | 12 March 1986 | 1 year, 232 days | Venstre | Schlüter I | |
| 24 | | Mimi Jakobsen (born 1948) | 12 March 1986 | 3 June 1988 | 2 years, 83 days | Centre Democrats | Schlüter I–II | |
| 25 | | Aase Olesen (1934–2013) | 3 June 1988 | 18 December 1990 | 2 years, 198 days | Social Liberal | Schlüter III | |
| 26 | | Else Winther Andersen (born 1941) | 18 December 1990 | 25 January 1993 | 2 years, 38 days | Venstre | Schlüter IV | |
| 27 | | Karen Jespersen (born 1947) | 25 January 1993 | 28 January 1994 | 1 year, 3 days | Social Democrats | P. N. Rasmussen I | |
| 28 | | Bente Juncker (born 1944) | 28 January 1994 | 11 February 1994 | 14 days | Centre Democrats | P. N. Rasmussen I | |
| 29 | | Yvonne Herløv Andersen (born 1942) | 11 February 1994 | 27 September 1994 | 228 days | Centre Democrats | P. N. Rasmussen I | |
| (27) | | Karen Jespersen (born 1947) | 27 September 1994 | 23 February 2000 | 5 years, 149 days | Centre Democrats | P. N. Rasmussen II–III–IV | |
| 30 | | Henrik Dam Kristensen (born 1957) | 23 February 2000 | 27 November 2001 | 1 year, 277 days | Social Democrats | P. N. Rasmussen IV | |
| 31 | | Henriette Kjær (born 1966) | 27 November 2001 | 2 August 2004 | 2 years, 249 days | Conservative People's Party | A. F. Rasmussen I | |
| 32 | | Eva Kjer Hansen (born 1964) | 2 August 2004 | 12 September 2007 | 3 years, 41 days | Venstre | A. F. Rasmussen I–II | |
| (27) | | Karen Jespersen (born 1947) | 12 September 2007 | 23 November 2007 | 72 days | Venstre | A. F. Rasmussen II | |
Minister of Welfare (Velfærdsminister)
| (27) | | Karen Jespersen (born 1947) | 23 November 2007 | 7 April 2009 | 1 year, 135 days | Venstre | A. F. Rasmussen III | |
Minister of the Interior and Social Affairs (Indenrigs- og socialminister)
| 33 | | Karen Ellemann (born 1969) | 7 April 2009 | 23 February 2010 | 322 days | Venstre | L. L. Rasmussen I | |
Minister of Social Affairs (Socialminister)
| 34 | | Benedikte Kiær (born 1969) | 23 February 2010 | 3 October 2011 | 1 year, 222 days | Conservative People's Party | L. L. Rasmussen I | |
Minister of Social Affairs and Integration (Social- og integrationsminister)
| 35 | | Karen Hækkerup (born 1974) | 3 October 2011 | 9 August 2013 | 1 year, 310 days | Social Democrats | Thorning-Schmidt I | |
Minister of Social Affairs, Children and Integration (Social-, børne- og integrationsminister)
| 36 | | Annette Vilhelmsen (born 1959) | 9 August 2013 | 3 February 2014 | 178 days | Green Left | Thorning-Schmidt I | |
Minister of Children, Gender Equality, Integration and Social Affairs (Minister for Børn, Ligestilling, Integration og Sociale forhold)
| 37 | | Manu Sareen (born 1967) | 3 februar 2014 | 28 June 2015 | 1 year, 145 days | Social Liberals | Thorning-Schmidt II | |
Minister of the Interior and Social Affairs (Indenrigs- og socialminister)
| (33) | | Karen Ellemann (born 1969) | 28 June 2015 | 28 November 2016 | 1 year, 153 days | Venstre | L. L. Rasmussen II | |
Minister of Children and Social Affairs (Børne- og socialminister)
| 38 | | Mai Mercado (born 1980) | 28 November 2016 | 27 June 2019 | 2 years, 211 days | Conservatives | L. L. Rasmussen III | |
Minister of Social Affairs and the Interior (Social- og indenrigsminister)
| 39 | | Astrid Krag (born 1982) | 27 June 2019 | 21 January 2021 | 1 year, 208 days | Social Democrats | Frederiksen I | |
Minister of Social and Elderly Affairs (Social- og ældreminister)
| (39) | | Astrid Krag (born 1982) | 21 January 2021 | 15 December 2022 | 1 year, 328 days | Social Democrats | Frederiksen I | |
Minister of Social Affairs and Housing (Social- og boligminister)
| 40 | | Pernille Rosenkrantz-Theil (born 1977) | 15 December 2022 | 29 August 2024 | 1 year, 258 days | Social Democrats | Frederiksen II | |
| 41 | | Sophie Hæstorp Andersen (born 1974) | 29 August 2024 | 3 June 2026 | 1 year, 278 days | Social Democrat | Frederiksen II | |
Minister of Social Affairs (Socialminister)
| 42 | | Monika Rubin (born 1987) | 3 June 2026 | Incumbent | 150 days | Moderates | Frederiksen III | |
