= Minister for Housing (Denmark) =

Danish cabinet position

- Boligminister (Danish)
- State coat of arms of the Kingdom of Denmark

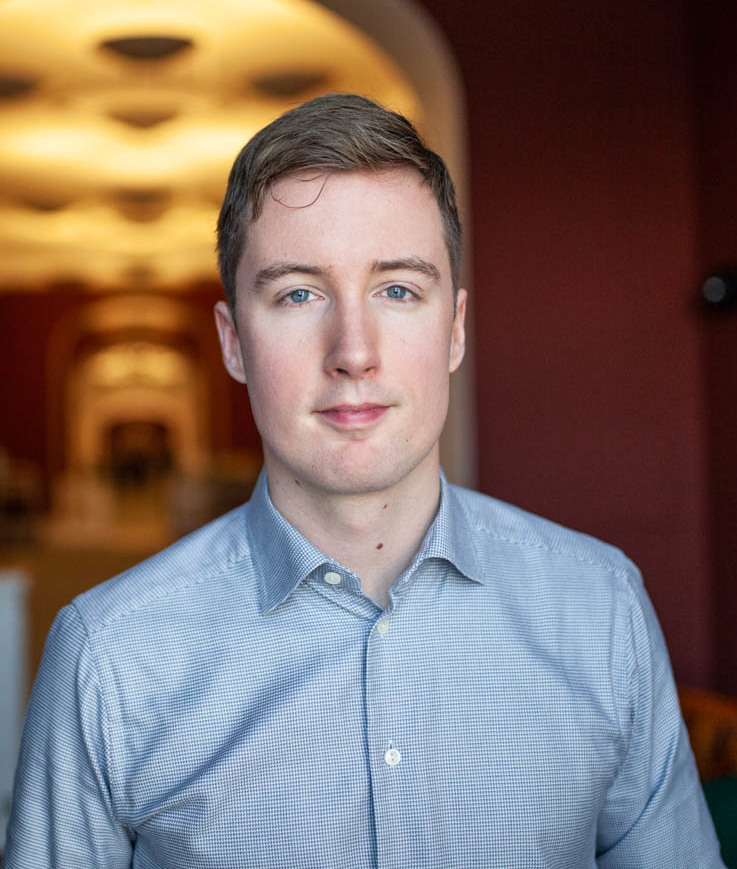
- Incumbent; Jacob Mark since 3 June 2026
- Ministry of Social Affairs and Housing
- Type: Minister
- Member of: Cabinet; State Council
- Reports to: the prime minister
- Seat: Slotsholmen
- Appointer: The Monarch; (on the advice of the prime minister)
- Formation: 23 November 1947; 78 years ago
- First holder: Johannes Kjærbøl
- Succession: depending on the order in the State Council
- Deputy: Permanent Secretary
- Salary: 1.624.503,02 DKK (€217,931), in 2026
- Website: Official website

The Minister for Housing (Danish: Boligminister) is a Danish minister.

== List of ministers ==
No.	Portrait	Name (born-died)	Term of office			Political party	Government	Ref.
No.	Portrait	Name (born-died)	Took office	Left office	Time in office	Political party	Government	Ref.
Minister of Housing (Boligminister)
1		Johannes Kjærbøl (1885–1973)	23 November 1947	23 November 1949	2 years, 0 days	Social Democrat	Hedtoft I	
Minister of Labor and Housing (Arbejds- og boligminister)
(1)		Johannes Kjærbøl (1885–1973)	23 November 1949	30 October 1950	341 days	Social Democrat	Hedtoft II	
Minister of the Interior and Housing (Indenrigs- og boligminister)
2		Aksel Møller (1906–1958)	30 October 1950	30 September 1953	2 years, 304 days	Conservative	Eriksen	
(1)		Johannes Kjærbøl (1885–1973)	30 September 1953	30 August 1955	2 years, 0 days	Social Democrat	Hedtoft III; Hansen I	
Minister of Housing (Boligminister)
(1)		Johannes Kjærbøl (1885–1973)	30 August 1955	28 May 1957	1 year, 271 days	Social Democrat	Hansen I	
Minister of Labor and Housing (Arbejds- og boligminister)
3		Kaj Bundvad (1904–1976)	28 May 1957	31 March 1960	2 years, 308 days	Social Democrat	Hansen II; Kampmann I	
Minister of Housing (Boligminister)
4		Carl P. Jensen (1906–1987)	31 March 1960	26 September 1964	4 years, 179 days	Social Democrat	Kampmann I–II; Krag I	
5		Kaj Andresen (1907–1998)	26 September 1964	2 February 1968	3 years, 129 days	Social Democrat	Krag II	
6		Aage Hastrup (1919–1993)	2 February 1968	11 October 1971	3 years, 251 days	Conservative	Baunsgaard	
7		Helge Nielsen (1918–1991)	11 October 1971	27 September 1973	1 year, 351 days	Social Democrat	Krag III; Jørgensen I	
8		Svend Jakobsen (1935–2022)	27 September 1973	19 November 1973	83 days	Social Democrat	Jørgensen I	
Minister of Labor and Housing (Arbejds- og boligminister)
9		Johan Philipsen (1911–1992)	19 November 1973	13 February 1975	1 year, 86 days	Venstre	Hartling	
Minister of Housing (Boligminister)
(7)		Helge Nielsen (1918–1991)	13 February 1975	26 January 1977	1 year, 348 days	Social Democrat	Jørgensen II	
(8)		Svend Jakobsen (1935–2022)	26 January 1977	26 February 1977	31 days	Social Democrat	Jørgensen II	
10		Ove Hove (1914–1993)	26 February 1977	30 August 1978	1 year, 185 days	Social Democrat	Jørgensen II	
11		Erling Olsen (1927–2011)	30 August 1978	10 September 1982	4 years, 11 days	Social Democrat	Jørgensen III–IV–V	
12		Niels Bollmann (1939–1989)	10 September 1982	12 March 1986	3 years, 183 days	Centre Democrat	Schlüter I	
13		Thor Pedersen (born 1945)	12 March 1986	10 September 1987	1 year, 182 days	Venstre	Schlüter I	
14		Flemming Kofod-Svendsen (born 1944)	10 September 1987	3 June 1988	267 days	Christian Democrat	Schlüter II	
15		Agnete Laustsen (1935–2018)	3 June 1988	18 December 1990	2 years, 198 days	Conservative	Schlüter III	
16		Svend Erik Hovmand (born 1945)	18 December 1990	25 January 1993	2 years, 38 days	Venstre	Schlüter IV	
(14)		Flemming Kofod-Svendsen (born 1944)	25 January 1993	27 September 1994	1 year, 245 days	Christian Democrat	P.N. Rasmussen I	
17		Ole Løvig Simonsen (born 1935)	27 September 1994	23 February 1998	3 years, 149 days	Social Democrat	P.N. Rasmussen II–III	
Minister of Cities and Housing (By- og boligminister)
18		Jytte Andersen (born 1942)	23 March 1998	21 December 2000	2 years, 302 days	Social Democrat	P.N. Rasmussen IV	
19		Lotte Bundsgaard (born 1973)	21 December 2000	27 November 2001	341 days	Social Democrat	P.N. Rasmussen IV	
Minister of the City, Housing and Rural Affairs (Minister for by, bolig og landdistrikter)
20		Carsten Hansen (born 1957)	3 October 2011	28 June 2015	3 years, 268 days	Social Democrat	Thorning-Schmidt I–II	
Minister of Foreigners, Integration and Housing (Udlændinge-, integrations- og boligminister)
21		Inger Støjberg (born 1973)	28 June 2015	28 November 2016	1 year, 153 days	Venstre	L.L. Rasmussen II	
Minister of Transport, Construction and Housing (Transport-, bygnings- og boligminister)
22		Ole Birk Olesen (born 1972)	28 November 2016	27 June 2019	2 years, 211 days	Liberal Alliance	L.L. Rasmussen III	
Minister of Housing (Boligminister)
23		Kaare Dybvad (born 1984)	27 June 2019	21 January 2021	1 year, 208 days	Social Democrats	Frederiksen I	
Minister of the Interior and Housing (Indenrigs- og boligminister)
(23)		Kaare Dybvad (born 1984)	21 January 2021	2 May 2022	1 year, 101 days	Social Democrats	Frederiksen I	
24		Christian Rabjerg Madsen (born 1986)	2 May 2022	15 December 2022	227 days	Social Democrats	Frederiksen I	
Minister of Social Affairs and Housing (Social- og boligminister)
25		Pernille Rosenkrantz-Theil (born 1977)	15 December 2022	29 August 2024	1 year, 258 days	Social Democrats	Frederiksen II	
26		Sophie Hæstorp Andersen (born 1974)	29 August 2024	3 June 2026	1 year, 278 days	Social Democrat	Frederiksen II	
Minister of Children, Elderly Affairs and Housing (Børne-, ældre- og boligminister)
27		Jacob Mark (born 1991)	3 June 2026	Incumbent	143 days	Green Left	Frederiksen III	
