= Agnete Laustsen =

Danish politician (1935–2018)

Member of the Folketing for the Søndre Storkreds constituency
- In office 23 October 1979 – 10 March 1998

Minister of Housing
- In office 3 June 1988 – 18 December 1990
- Monarch: Margrethe II
- Prime Minister: Poul Schlüter
- Preceded by: Flemming Kofod-Svendsen
- Succeeded by: Svend Erik Hovmand

Minister of Health
- In office 10 September 1987 – 3 June 1988
- Monarch: Margrethe II
- Prime Minister: Poul Schlüter
- Preceded by: Johannes Kjærbøl (as Minister of Development and Health Affairs)
- Succeeded by: Elsebeth Kock-Petersen

Personal details
- Born: 25 September 1935 Copenhagen, Denmark
- Died: 23 October 2018 (aged 83) Denmark
- Party: The Conservative People's Party
- Spouse: Svend Ole Tjellesen (m. 1996; died 2004)

Agnete Laustsen (25 September 1935 – 23 October 2018) was a Danish Conservative People's Party politician. She served as a member of the Folketing representing the Søndre Storkreds constituency from October 1979 to March 1998. Laustsen was appointed the first Danish Minister of Health by Prime Minister Poul Schlüter, a post she held between September 1987 and June 1988, and was subsequently appointed as the first woman to hold the position of Minister of Housing between June 1988 and December 1990. She was appointed Commander of the Order of the Dannebrog in 1989.

== Biography ==
Laustsen was born in Copenhagen, on 25 September 1935, to the civil engineer Otto Laustsen and his wife Else Laustsen. She was brought up with a conservative outlook on life and with bourgeois values in Copenhagen. Laustsen began studying at N. Zahle's School in 1954 and graduated with Master of Science and Candidate of Law degrees from the University of Copenhagen seven years later. Whilst she was studying, she was active in student politics. Laustsen was chair of the Law and Political Science Student Council prior to its shift to the political left and a member of the Danish Bar Association's board from 1958 to 1960. Following her graduation, she was employed as a secretary in the Ministry of the Interior in 1961. Laustsen was promoted to the role of clerk and assistant lawyer nine years later and was appointed the Consumer Ombudsman's office manager in 1977.

She also became active in the political scene. From 1962 to 1987, Laustsen was a member of the Copenhagen City Council (Borgerrepræsentation), and she was elected to serve as its second chairman between 1982 and 1986. She unsuccessfully stood for election in the City Hall constituency of the Folketing on behalf of The Conservative People's Party (DKF) at both the 1964 Danish general election and the 1975 Danish general election. Laustsen also was unsuccessful in being elected to represent the Hvidovre constituency on behalf of the Social Democrats at the 1973 Danish general election. She was a member of the Copenhagen Municipality Cultural Foundation's board from 1970 and on the board of the Thorvaldsens Museum between 1972 and 1980. From 1971 to 1997, Laustsen served as president of the European Union of Women's Danish section, which has both conservative and Christian Democratic women from 12 member nations.

At the 1979 Danish general election, she gained election to the Folketing on her fourth attempt when she voted to represent the Søndre Storkreds for the DKF. Laustsen had interests in housing and social policy. She was a second alternate Member of the European Parliament from 1979 to 1984; a member of the Nordic Council in 1983; was on the Ny Carlsberg Glyptotek board between 1986 and 1987; and served as chair of the Folketing's Social Affairs Committee between 1983 and 1987. Laustsen was appointed by Poul Schlüter, the Prime Minister, to serve as Denmark's first Minister of Health from 10 September 1987 to 3 June 1988. She had to moderate the debate on AIDS in Denmark and talks concerning health sector priorities. Laustsen supported private and public hospitals and wished to emphasise preventative efforts in healthcare.

Laustsen was subsequently promoted by Schlüter to become the first woman to be made the Minister of Housing; she held the post from 3 June 1988 to 18 December 1990. She was able to raise funding for urban renewal even though residential areas had experienced heavy savings and also put much effort into preserving historical buildings and raising construction exports. Laustsen received much criticism, particularly from Kirsten Jacobsen, the spokesperson of the Progress Party, who accused her of over-borrowing. Following her resignation from government after the 1990 Danish general election, she was the DKF's foreign affairs spokesperson between 1990 and 1998 and became part of its cultural policy rapporteur in 1995. After losing her seat in the Folketing in the 1998 Danish general election, Laustsen was a member of the board of the nursing home Rosenborgcentret from 1998 to 2014, and authored multiple articles in Danish as well as in foreign magazines and newspapers. In 1989, she was appointed Commander of the Order of the Dannebrog.

== Personal life ==
From 20 January 1996 to his death in 2004, Laustsen was married to the director Svend Ole Tjellesen. She died on 23 October 2018.
