= Elsebeth Kock-Petersen =

Danish politician

Minister of Health
- In office 3 June 1988 – 7 December 1989
- Monarch: Margrethe II
- Prime Minister: Poul Schlüter
- Preceded by: Agnete Laustsen
- Succeeded by: Ester Larsen

Minister of Social Affairs
- In office 23 July 1984 – 12 March 1986
- Monarch: Margrethe II
- Prime Minister: Poul Schlüter
- Preceded by: Palle Simonsen
- Succeeded by: Mimi Jakobsen

Minister for Ecclesiastical Affairs
- In office 10 September 1982 – 23 July 1984
- Monarch: Margrethe II
- Prime Minister: Poul Schlüter
- Preceded by: Tove Lindbo Larsen
- Succeeded by: Mette Madsen

Member of the Folketing for the Storstrøms County constituency
- In office 9 January 1975 – 14 February 1977

Member of the Folketing for the Vestsjælland County constituency
- In office 10 January 1984 – 12 December 1990

Personal details
- Born: 15 January 1949 (age 77) Copenhagen, Denmark
- Party: Venstre
- Spouse: Nils K.-P. (m. 1970; div. 1990)

Elsebeth Kock-Petersen (born 15 January 1949) is a Danish Venstre politician. She was a member of the Folketing who represented the Storstrøms County constituency from 1975 to 1977 and then the Vestsjælland County between 1984 and 1990. Kock-Petersen was appointed the youngest ever Minister for Ecclesiastical Affairs in 1982 before being made Minister of Social Affairs between 1984 and 1986 and then the Minister of Health from 1988 to 1989. She was appointed Commander of the Order of the Dannebrog in 1984.

== Early life and education ==
Kock-Petersen was born to the Nørrebro-based parish priest Ejnar Larsen and housewife Anna Maria Elkjær Larsen in Copenhagen on 15 January 1949. She was educated at Nørre Gymnasium from 1967 and graduated from the University of Copenhagen with a Candidate of Law in 1973.

== Career ==
Aged 15, Kock-Petersen began her involvement in politics as a member of the Venstres Ungdom. She sat on the board of the Liberal Youth Board in Copenhagen-Frederiksberg, between 1965 and 1970. Kock-Petersen also worked as a Sunday school teacher at Brorsons Kirke as well becoming a member of Nørrebro's Local Council between 1965 and 1973 and the City of Copenhagen's advisory youth committee from 1967 to 1973. From 1970 to 1972, she was a Member of the House of Representatives in Østre Storkreds, and was appointed to Venstre's primary board in 1979.

At the 1971 Danish general election, Kock-Petersen stood for election to the Folketing in three different constituencies that were in Sundbykredsen, Rådhuskredsen and Christianshavnskredsen but she was unsuccessful in gaining election. She went on to not get elected to represent the Næstvedkredsen constituency at the 1973 Danish general election. Kock-Petersen worked as a secretary and later clerk at National Association of Local Authorities from 1973 to 1978 and then became an assistant for the Ministry of Foreign Affairs in 1979. At the 1975 Danish general election on 9 January, Kock-Petersen was elected to the Folketing as a representative of the Storstrøms County constituency caused by the Venstre party led by Prime Minister Poul Hartling gaining seats. She lost her seat the 1977 Danish general election on 15 February of that year when her party lost seats.

Kock-Petersen joined the Ministry of Justice's Marriage Committee between 1976 and 1983. At the age of 33, she was appointed Minister for Ecclesiastical Affairs under the first government of Poul Schlüter on 10 September 1982. Kock-Petersen was the youngest person to be appointed to that position of government. At the 1984 Danish general election on 10 January, she won re-election to the Folketing, this time as the representative of the Vestsjælland County constituency. Kock-Petersen was appointed Minister for Social Affairs on 23 July 1984 after Schlüter reshuffled his cabinet and she declined to be made the Minister of Housing two years later because she was disinterested with it. Her former role as Minister for Ecclesisatical Affairs was assigned to Mette Madsen.

A cabinet reshuffle in 1986 saw Kock-Petersen removed as Minister for Social Affairs and she was appointed a member of the board for both The Mission among the Homeless and SJL Bank. When a new government was established in 1988, she accepted the offer to become the new Minister of Health and she began the role on 3 June 1988. Kock-Petersen resigned the post at her own request, and she left the post 7 December 1989 before resigning from the Folketing on 12 December 1990 to focus more time on her family. She and her two children secretly relocated to the United Kingdom and settled in Bedford, north of London and no longer makes any public appearances.

== Personal life ==
She was married to the lawyer Nils K.-P. from 13 December 1970 until they divorced in the early 1990s. In 1984, Kock-Petersen was appointed Commander of the Order of the Dannebrog.
