= Frederiksen Cabinet =

Frederiksen Cabinet may refer to the following cabinets of Danish Prime Minister Mette Frederiksen:

- Frederiksen I Cabinet (2019-Dec 2022)
- Frederiksen II Cabinet (Dec 2022-Jun 2026)
- Frederiksen III Cabinet (Jun 2026-present)
