= Minister of Cities and Rural Areas (Denmark) =

Danish cabinet position

- Minister for byer og landdistrikter
- State coat of arms of the Kingdom of Denmark

- Incumbent; Karina Lorentzen since 27 October 2026
- Ministry of Cities, Rural Areas and Transport
- Type: Minister
- Member of: Cabinet; State Council
- Reports to: the Prime minister
- Seat: Slotsholmen
- Appointer: The Monarch; (on the advice of the Prime Minister)
- Formation: 23 February 1998; 28 years ago
- First holder: Jytte Andersen
- Succession: depending on the order in the State Council
- Deputy: Permanent Secretary
- Salary: 1.624.503,02 DKK (€217,931), in 2026

The Danish Minister of Cities and Rural Areas (Danish: Minister for byer og landdistrikter), is a minister in the government of Denmark, with overall responsibility for strategy and policy across the Ministry of Cities, Rural Areas and Transport. The ministry and the ministerial position were created in 1998 by the fourth Poul Nyrup Rasmussen cabinet.

== List of ministers ==
No.	Portrait	Name (born-died)	Term of office			Political party	Government	Ref.
No.	Portrait	Name (born-died)	Took office	Left office	Time in office	Political party	Government	Ref.
Minister of Cities and Housing (By- og boligminister)
1		Jytte Andersen (born 1942)	23 March 1998	21 December 2000	2 years, 302 days	Social Democrat	P.N. Rasmussen IV	
2		Lotte Bundsgaard (born 1973)	21 December 2000	27 November 2001	341 days	Social Democrat	P.N. Rasmussen IV	
Minister of Cities, Housing and Rural Areas (Minister for by, bolig og landdistrikter)
3		Carsten Hansen (born 1957)	3 October 2011	28 June 2015	3 years, 268 days	Social Democrat	Thorning-Schmidt I–II	
Minister of Rural Areas (Minister for landdistrikter)
4		Louise Schack Elholm (born 1977)	15 December 2022	23 November 2023	343 days	Venstre	Frederiksen II	
Minister of Cities and Rural Areas (Minister for byer og landdistrikter)
5		Morten Dahlin (born 1989)	23 November 2023	3 June 2026	2 years, 192 days	Venstre	Frederiksen II	
Minister of Cities, Rural Areas and Transport (By-, land- og transportminister)
6		Signe Munk (born 1990)	3 June 2026	27 October 2026	146 days	Green Left	Frederiksen III	
7		Karina Lorentzen (born 1973)	27 October 2026	Incumbent	2 days	Green Left	Frederiksen III	
