= Poul Møller =

Danish politician

Poul Møller (13 October 1919 in Frederiksberg – 5 August 1997) was a Danish Conservative People's Party politician.

In 1969 he became the leader of his political party following the death of Poul Sorensen. He served as a Member of the European Parliament from 1979 to 1986.

He was married to fellow politician Lis Møller. His son Per Stig Moller is a former foreign and culture minister. His brother Aksel was also a politician.
