= Poul Sørensen (politician) =

Danish politician (1904–1969)

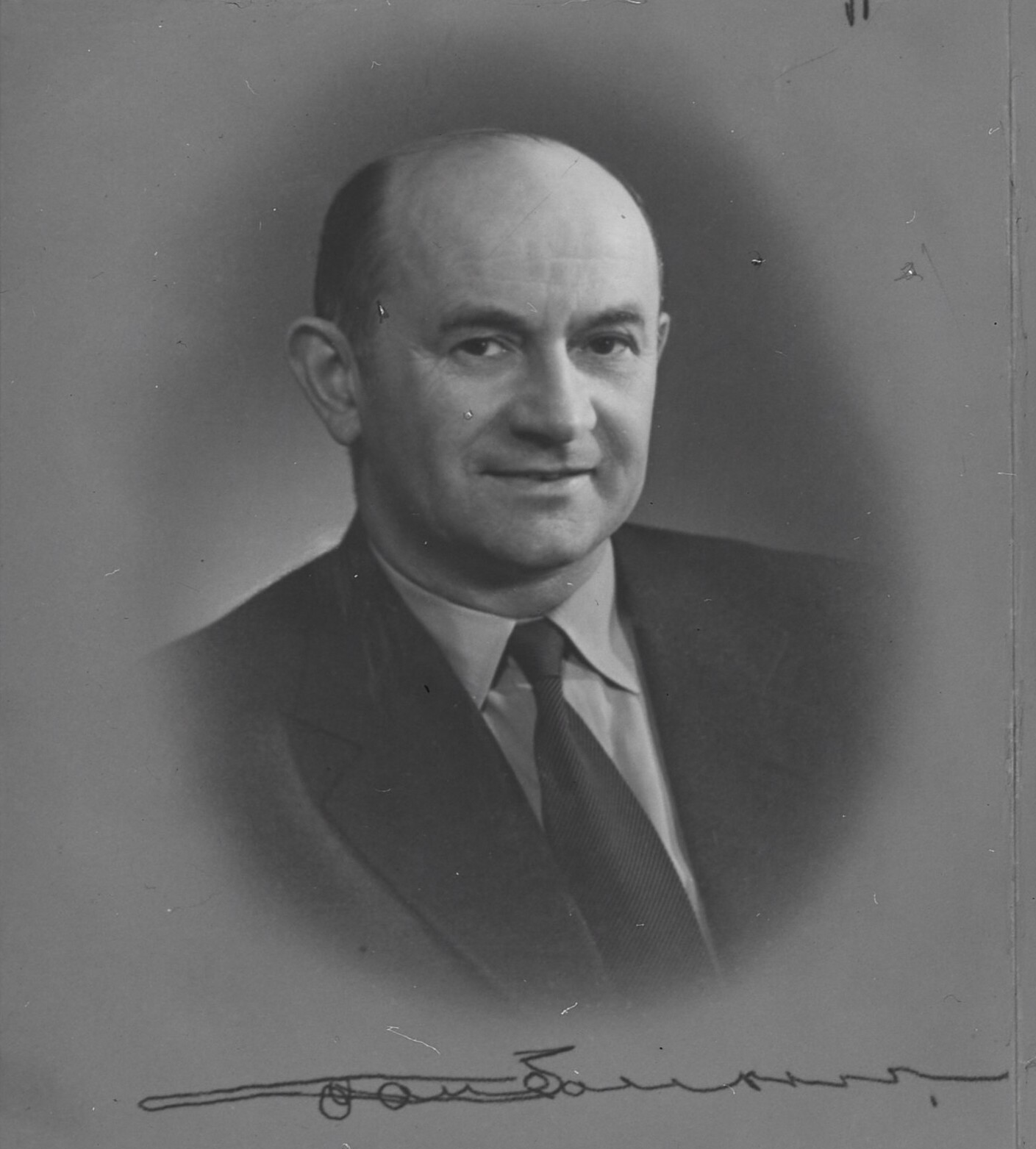

Minister of Interior
- In office 2 February 1968 – 29 June 1969
- Prime Minister: Hilmar Baunsgaard

Minister of Labour and Social Affairs
- In office 30 October 1950 – 30 September 1953
- Prime Minister: Erik Eriksen

Personal details
- Born: 25 June 1904 Roskilde, Denmark
- Died: 29 June 1969 (aged 65) Hornbæk, Denmark
- Resting place: Roskilde, Denmark
- Party: Conservative People's Party
- Spouse: Nele Topsøe

Poul Sørensen (25 June 1904 – 29 June 1969) was a Danish politician who headed the parliamentary group of the Conservative People's Party from 1958 to 1969. He was a follower of the pragmatic social conservatism. He also served as the ministry of labor and social affairs between 1950 and 1953 and minister of interior between 1968 and 1969.

== Early life and education ==
Sørensen was born in Roskilde on 25 June 1904. He was trained as a merchant.

== Career and activities ==
Sørensen started his political career in the Young Conservatives and was its deputy chairman from 1931 to 1935. He was elected to Roskilde City Council in 1933 and became a member of the Parliament for Odense on 26 September 1941. During the occupation of Denmark by the Nazis, he joined a group of conservative and social democratic politicians who contributed to the resistance movement. He was arrested several times by the Germans. He continued to serve at the Parliament until 1947.

Sørensen was reelected to the Parliament on 5 September 1950. He was appointed minister of labor and social affairs to the cabinet led by Erik Eriksen and served in the post from 30 October 1950 to 30 September 1953. During this period he became one of the leading figures in the Conservative Party along with Aksel Møller. He succeeded Møller as the chairman of the parliamentary group in 1958 following the death of Møller.

Sørensen was named as the minister of the interior in Hilmar Baunsgaard's cabinet on 2 February 1968 and held the post until his death in 1969. He was also a deputy until 1969.

== Personal life and death ==
Sørensen married Nele Topsøe on 7 January 1957. He died in Hornbæk on 29 June 1969 and was buried in Roskilde.
