= Mette Madsen =

Danish politician (1924–2015)

Member of the Folketing for the North Jutland constituency
- In office 21 September 1971 – 1 February 1988

Minister for Ecclesiastical Affairs
- In office 23 July 1984 – 3 June 1988
- Monarch: Margrethe II
- Prime Minister: Poul Schlüter
- Preceded by: Elsebeth Kock-Petersen
- Succeeded by: Torben Rechendorff

Personal details
- Born: Mette Marie Fruensgaard; 3 July 1924 Pandrup, North Jutland Region, Jetsmark Parish, Denmark
- Died: 12 December 2015 (aged 91) Aalborg, Denmark
- Party: Venstre
- Spouse: Gunnar Otto Madsen (m. 1942)
- Children: 3
- Occupation: Author

Mette Marie Madsen (née Fruensgaard; 3 July 1924 – 12 December 2015) was a Danish politician for the Venstre political party, autobiographer and writer. She was the minister representing the North Jutland constituency in the Folketing between 1971 and 1988 and she was the Minister for Ecclesiastical Affairs from 1984 to 1988 during the premiership of Poul Schlüter. Madsen was a member of the NATO Parliamentary Assembly, the first female chair of the Assembly's Committee on Culture, Education and Information and both the chair of the supervisory committee of both the Danish Arts Foundation and the Royal Danish Theatre. She was appointed Commander of the Order of the Dannebrog and received other foreign awards.

== Biography ==
She was born Mette Marie Fruensgaard on a farm in Pandrup, North Jutland Region, Jetsmark Parish on 3 July 1924. Madsen was the daughter of the farm owners Holger Fruensgaard and his wife Kathrine Jacobsen. She attended Åbybro Realskole from which she left at age 18 following the completion of her examinations. From 1958 to 1967, Madsen worked as a satirical employee at Aalborg Amtstidende and then at Vendsyssel Tidende in 1967. She began writing satirical articles for the Blæksprutten in 1964, authored memoir and poem collections, and songs for national meetings of the Danish Social Liberal Party.

In 1971, Madsen stood as a candidate for the Venstre political party in the Frederiksberg constituency for the Folketing. That same year, she was elected to represent the North Jutland constituency in the Folketing on behalf of Venstre at the 1971 Danish general election on 21 September. During her time in parliament, Madsen served on multiple boards. From 1970 to 1977, she was a member of the Hvetbo Herreds Sparekasse's supervisory board; was a member of the Great Women's Commission between 1971 and 1974; was a member of the Council of Europe's Social and Health Committee from 1973 to 1974 and of the Committee on Culture and Education and the Committee on Architectural Heritage from 1975 to 1979. Madsen was a member of the Kongelig Mayestaits Acteurs during 1973 and of The Board of the Danish Inter-Parliamentary Group between 1974 and 1979 of which she served as its vice-president in 1976.

She was a member of the Danish Diabetes Association between 1973 and 1983 and was on Brønderslev Ventetidshjem's supervisory board from 1975 to 1978. From 1974 to 1978, Madsen was a member of the Danish Arts Foundation's and the Royal Danish Theatre's Board of Representatives before serving as both its chairmen of their respective supervisory committees between 1978 and 1984. She was also chair of the Statens Museumsnævn from 1977 to 1982 and of both the Vendsyssel Tidendes Fond and the Friends of the Vrå Exhibition between 1977 and 1984. Madsen was a member of the board of each of the Designmuseum Denmark, Danmarks Nationalbank, the Danish Health Fund and the Danish Handcraft Guild. From 1980, she was a member of the Danish Conscription Board, a member of Venstre's parliamentary group between 1973 and 1975 and again from 1976 to 1984 and on Venstre's main board from 1977.

From 1979 to 1984, Madsen was a member of the NATO Parliamentary Assembly and was the first women to be elected chair of the Assembly's Committee on Culture, Education and Information on 1982. She was a member of the Presidium Folketing from 1981 to 1984, served as the Minister for Ecclesiastical Affairs from 23 July 1984 to 3 June 1988 under the premiership of Poul Schlüter and she was temporary Venstre political party member of the Folketing in the North Jutland constituency between 25 January 1988 and 1 February 1988. As minister, Madsen introduced legislation to protect cemeteries and historical monuments and helped stop Copenhagen from clearing the large Assistens Cemetery as well as introducing the teaching of Christianity to Danish schoolchildren and obtaining more funding for employing more priests.

She authored Vers og viser in 1971; Hen på eftermiddagen the poem collection two years later; Rosen i verden in 1981; the poem collection Sommerens veje in 1982 and Med Grundtvig ved hånde in 1984. Madsen authored her political memoirs Og så er der kaffe in 1992; I Anledening Af containing poetry and songs in 1994 and Tiden der Fulgte in 1997. Her childhood memoirs, Husk nu at nje, were published in 1997. She was appointed Commander of the Order of the Dannebrog in 1985 and she has received other foreign awards. This included the Icelandic Knight of the Order of the Falcon (Second Class) and the French National Order of Culture. Other awards Madsen received were the Ravn-Joensens Mindelegat in 1968 and the Fanfareprisen Chr IV Laug in 1997. From 1989 to 2005, she was chair and later vice-chair of the Foreningen For Kirkegårdskultur.

== Personal life ==
She married the district court lawyer Gunnar Otto Madsen on 1 September 1942. Madsen did not have any biological children but she adopted her husband's three children from a previous marriage in 1965. On 12 December 2015, she died, and a funeral ceremony was held for her at Hasseris Church on 19 September.
