= Eva Gredal =

Danish politician

Eva Gredal MEP
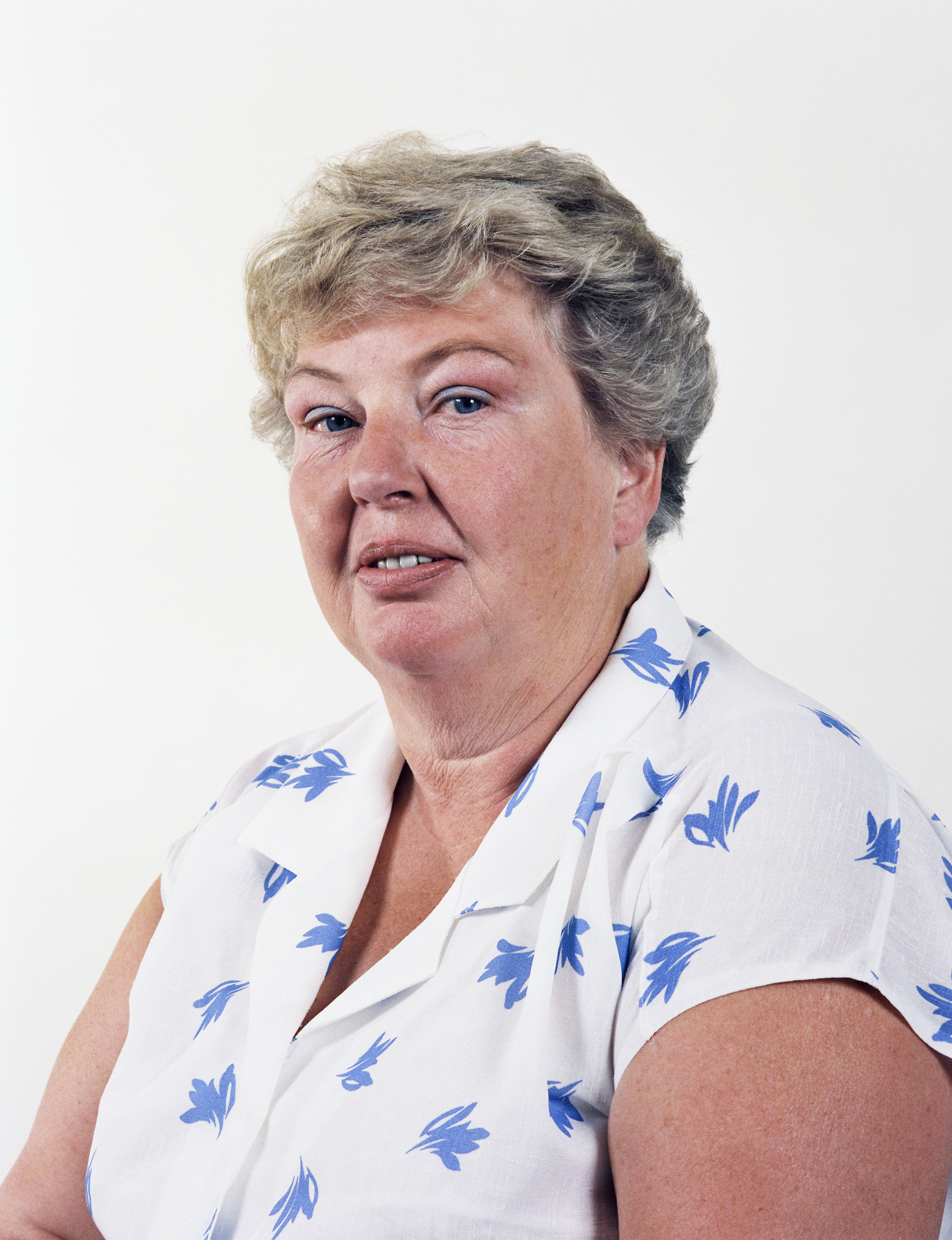

Member of the European Parliament
- In office 17 July 1979 – 24 July 1989
- Constituency: Denmark

Minister of Social Affairs
- In office 13 February 1975 – 30 August 1978
- Prime Minister: Anker Jørgensen
- Preceded by: Jacob Sørensen
- Succeeded by: Erling Jensen
- In office 11 October 1971 – 19 December 1973
- Prime Minister: Jens Otto Krag; Anker Jørgensen
- Preceded by: Nathalie Lind
- Succeeded by: Jacob Sørensen

Personal details
- Born: Eva Wilhelmsson Gredal; 27 February 1927 Nørresundby, Denmark
- Died: 2 August 1995 (aged 68) Stege, Denmark
- Party: Social Democrats

Eva Wilhelmson Gredal (19 February 1927 – 2 August 1995) was a Danish politician who served as a Member of the European Parliament for Denmark from 1979 to 1989. On a national level, she served as Minister of Social Affairs from 1971 to 1973 and again from 1975 to 1978.

== Biography ==
Gredal was born in Hvorup. Her father, Albert, was a pastor and her mother, Mary, worked as a seamstress. She graduated from secondary school in 1947, and after marrying Otto in 1949, returned to school to take up social work, and graduated in 1954. Gredal was chairperson of the Danish Social Advisory Association from 1959 to 1967, and after that she served as Vice President of the National Association for Mental Hygiene, serving in that role until 1971. It was during this time that she became involved in politics, as she felt that was the way for social workers to gain more national influence.

Gredal was first elected to the Folketing in 1971 as a member of the Social Democrats, and served in that role until 1979. She served as a Minister of Social Affairs from 1971 to 1973 and again from 1975 to 1978. In that role, she primarily focused on unemployment reform. She also pushed for an Equal Opportunities Council for Denmark, and was the delegate for the United Nations World Conference on Women in 1975. Gredal was elected as a Member of the European Parliament in 1979, and served two terms. She was on the Political Affairs Committee, as well as the Committee on Budgets. She also spent the last two years of her second term on the Environmental Committee. After her term ended in 1989, Gredal worked for European Movement International, and was the director of the Mental Health Association until her death in 1995.
