= Lis Møller =

Danish journalist (1918–1983)

Member of the Folketing for the Københavns Amtskreds constituency
- In office 8 December 1981 – 24 September 1983

Member of the Folketing for the Søndre Storkreds constituency
- In office 22 November 1966 – 4 December 1973

Personal details
- Born: 22 December 1918 Copenhagen, Denmark
- Died: 24 September 1983 (aged 64) Ordrup, Denmark
- Party: Conservative People's Party
- Spouse: Poul Møller (m. 1942)
- Children: 3
- Occupation: Politician
- Awards: Knight of the Order of the Dannebrog

Lis Møller (22 December 1918 – 24 September 1983) was a Danish journalist and Conservative People's Party politician who was elected to the Folketing for two non-consecutive periods. She joined the Young Conservatives when she was aged 15 and took part in organisational work for them. Møller joined Danmarks Radio as a programme secretary for radio in 1949 before moving to television seven years later. She focused on women's and social issues and underrepresented minorities while in Parliament and her broadcasting career focused on women's and youth, particularly social issues from those groups she worked with for organisations she was a part of. Møller was appointed Knight of the Order of the Dannebrog in 1976.

== Early life ==
On 22 December 1918, Møller was born in Copenhagen. She was the daughter of upper-class parents, the clerk Johan Frederik Gotschalk and the housekeeper Kirsten Olesen. Immediately following her birth, Møller was adopted by the wholesaler Hans Marinus Jakobsen and his wife Alma Jakobsen. She grew up with her foster parents and did not make contact with her biological parents until the death of her foster parents during her teenage years. Møller became a member of the Young Conservatives at the age of 15. In 1935, she graduated from N. Zahle's School with her high school diploma, and trained to be a journalist at both Holbæk Amts Avis and Sorø Amts Dagblad from 1936 to 1939.

== Career ==
Møller had taken part in conservative organizational work from 1934, chairing the Young Conservatives' second district between 1935 and 1936, doing women's work for the Young Conservatives in Slagelse from 1936 to 1938, leading the Copenhagen Young Conservative's women's branch from 1941 to 1943 and was secretary of the national organization's women's committee between 1943 and 1946. She led the Young Conservative's girls' country camps from 1945 to 1947. She worked in the Ministry of Finance between 1940 and 1943. From 1945 to 1949, Møller worked for the daily newspaper Nationaltidende, as well as at Dagens Nyheder. She then became employed as a program secretary at Danmarks Radio. Møller moved to television in 1956 and withdrew a request to join its current affairs department to enable her to cover societial issues in 1969 due to protests from TV Avisen employees.

She stood for election to the Folketing in the constituency of Nykøbing Sjællandkredsen in both the 1945 Danish Folketing election and the 1947 Danish Folketing elections on behalf of The Conservative People's Party that nominated her but she failed to get elected on both occasions. At the 1964 Danish general election, Møller did not get election to represent the Aalborg Østkredsen constituency in the Folketing but she would gain election in the Søndre Storkreds constituency at the 1966 Danish general election on 22 November of that year and remained there until 4 December 1973. She resigned her seat in 1973 and left The Conservative People's Party two years later. Møller was a in the Folketing as a representative of the Københavns Amtskreds constituency for The Conservative People's Party from 8 December 1981 to 24 September 1983.

In parliament, she focused on women's and social issues and underrepresented minorities; Møller did not seek high office. She established the Housing Fund for Single Mothers in 1966, which she chaired until 1983. She was on the board of several social organisations. In 1966, Møller became a member of both the Weaknesses 'School Association's support committee and the Tørsleff & Co's Housewives' Scholarship. She co-established the Danish Folk High School in Israel the following year and founded Danish Day Care Centers in 1968 that she chaired until 1973. Møller was also a member of the Disability Fund's Board of Representatives and its executive committee, the CISV's presidium and of Sofieskolen's supervisory board, the Board of Censors at the Danish School of Media and Journalism, the Mødrehjælpen's supervisory board, Børneringens main board, the Social Reform Commission, the Children Commission 1976 and the Elderly Commission. She was also chair of the Queen Louise Asylum Society, on the supervisory board of the children's psychotic treatment centre Sofieskolen and the Association for Spastic Paralyzed and worked for the Disability Foundation, the Lonely Old People's Guard and Terres des Hommes.

Møller's radio and television broadcasting career saw her focus on women's and youth, particularly social issues from those groups she worked with for organisations she was a part of. She authored Mennesker på skærmen in 1978. Møller was considered by her own party to be "troublesome" because of her focus on finding solutions to issues in society and was a rapporteur of social policy for several years, some of which were revoked. This included her stance on free abortions which she opposed on the grounds of pressure from fathers and instead campaigned for contraception and adoption. Møller believed young women should stay at home as much as possible when their children were young but that single mothers should put their children up for adoption. She was a feverent opponent of crèche and was a supporter of part-time kindergartens and part-time work. In 1979, Møller made the proposal that her housing fund be merged with the foundation established in Countess Danner's House. She contacted the Justice Minister and the foundation's board without notifying the house's occupants, who distanced themselves from her.

== Personal life ==
On 28 February 1942 in Copenhagen, she married the politician Poul Møller. They had two children, one of whom Per Stig Møller became a politician. Møller had a daughter from a previous short-lived marriage. She died in Ordrup on 24 September 1983 and was buried in Bispebjerg Cemetery.

== Awards ==
In 1967, Møller received the PH Prize. She also won the Ejnar Friis-Hansens in 1972, and DR's Kryger Prize two years later. In 1976, Møller was appointed Knight of the Order of the Dannebrog. In 1978, she received Birgit Saabye's Memorial Scholarship as well as The Berlin Foundation's Honorary Award. Møller was named an "honorary craftsman" by the Association of Craftsmen in Copenhagen for "her creative work in radio and television and the value her journalism brought to the understanding of social and human conditions.
