= Torben Rechendorff =

Danish politician (1937–2022)

Member of the Folketing
- In office 12 December 1990 – 11 March 1998
- Constituency: Vestsjællands County (1990–1994); Copenhagen county (1994–1998)

Chairman of the Conservative People's Party
- In office 1993–1995
- Preceded by: Poul Schlüter
- Succeeded by: Hans Engell

Minister for Ecclesiastical Affairs
- In office 3 June 1988 – 24 January 1993
- Preceded by: Mette Madsen
- Succeeded by: A.O. Andersen

Minister of Communications
- In office 10 January 1989 – 24 January 1993
- Preceded by: H.P. Clausen
- Succeeded by: Arne Melchior

Personal details
- Born: 1 April 1937 Copenhagen, Denmark
- Died: 28 November 2022 (aged 85)
- Party: DKF
- Education: Læreruddannelserne Metropol
- Occupation: Teacher

Torben Rechendorff (1 April 1937 – 28 November 2022) was a Danish teacher and politician. A member of the Conservative People's Party, he served as Minister for Ecclesiastical Affairs from 1988 to 1993 and was a member of the Folketing from 1990 to 1998.

Rechendorff died on 28 November 2022, at the age of 85.
