= Halima El Abassi =

Danish-Moroccan social worker and researcher

- Born: 9 April 1978 (age 47); Hedehusene, Denmark
- Education: Metropolitan University College (BA in Social Work); Aalborg University (MA in Social Sciences); Oslo Metropolitan University (PhD student)
- Occupations: Social worker, researcher, debater
- Years active: 2003–present
- Organization: Council for Ethnic Minorities (Chairperson)
- Known for: Research on honor-related conflicts and social control

Halima El Abassi (born 9 April 1978) is a Danish social worker, researcher and debater with a Danish-Moroccan background. She is best known for her research and information work in the areas of honor-related conflicts and social control. Since 2018, she has chaired the Council for Ethnic Minorities.

== Personal life ==
Halima El Abassis' parents immigrated to Denmark from Morocco. She was born in Hedehusene in 1978 and grew up in Roskilde. She married at the age of fifteen and has a total of three children. At the age of 21, she returned to the education system and five years later in 2003 completed her degree in social work from Metropolitan University College. In 2013, she finished her master's degree in social sciences at Aalborg University. Since then, she has been a PhD student at Oslo Metropolitan University, where she researches honor-related conflicts and social control.

== Public service ==
El Abassi has participated in many radio and television programs as well as written many articles and debate posts, often about honor-related conflicts and other issues related to immigrant circles. In 2007, she participated in DR2's talk show "The Oracles" as one of seven younger, well-educated Muslim women who in six broadcasts discussed dilemmas such as abortion, homosexuality and relationships.

She has been Vice President of the Association for Ethnic Gender Equality and leader of the steering group for a mentoring project for young women between the ages of 18 and 25 in the Ungdommens Røde Kors. El Abassi is the head of Odense municipality's expert group, which has been set up to analyze the municipality's efforts against negative social control and must help strengthen the municipality's efforts to reduce negative social control.

In 2018, the then Minister for Integration Inger Støjberg appointed El Abassi as the chairperson of the Council for Ethnic Minorities for a four-year term. El Abassi succeeded Yasar Cakmak.
