= Mads Olsen =

Danish politician (born 2002)

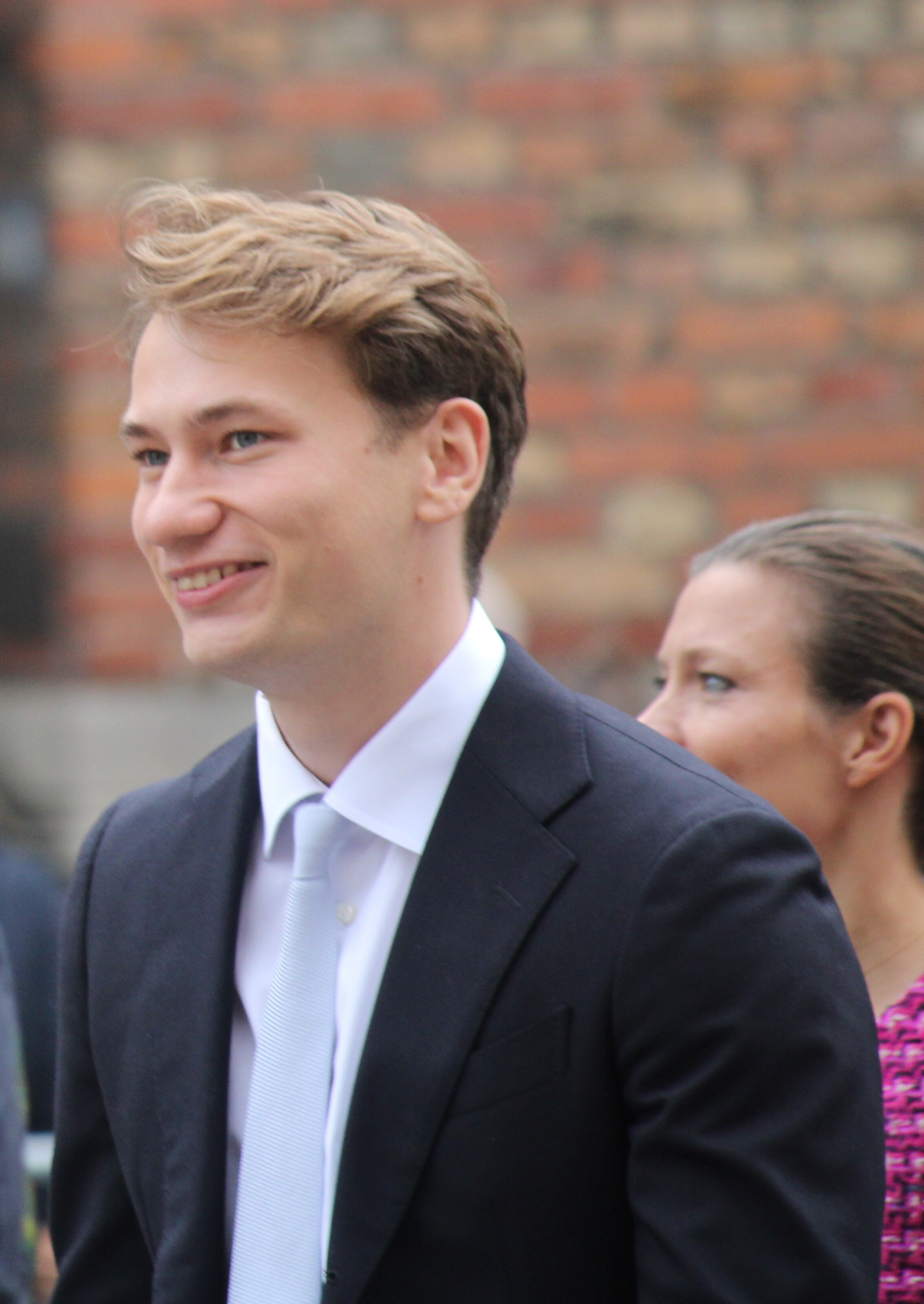
- Olsen in 2025

Member of the Folketing
- Incumbent
- Assumed office 1 December 2024
- Preceded by: Jacob Mark
- Constituency: Zealand

Personal details
- Born: 12 February 2002 (age 24)
- Party: Green Left

Mads Bruun Buch Olsen (born 12 February 2002) is a Danish politician serving as a member of the Folketing since 2024. He is the youngest current member of parliament.
