= Minister for Employment (Denmark) =

Danish cabinet position

- Beskæftigelsesminister
- State coat of arms of the Kingdom of Denmark

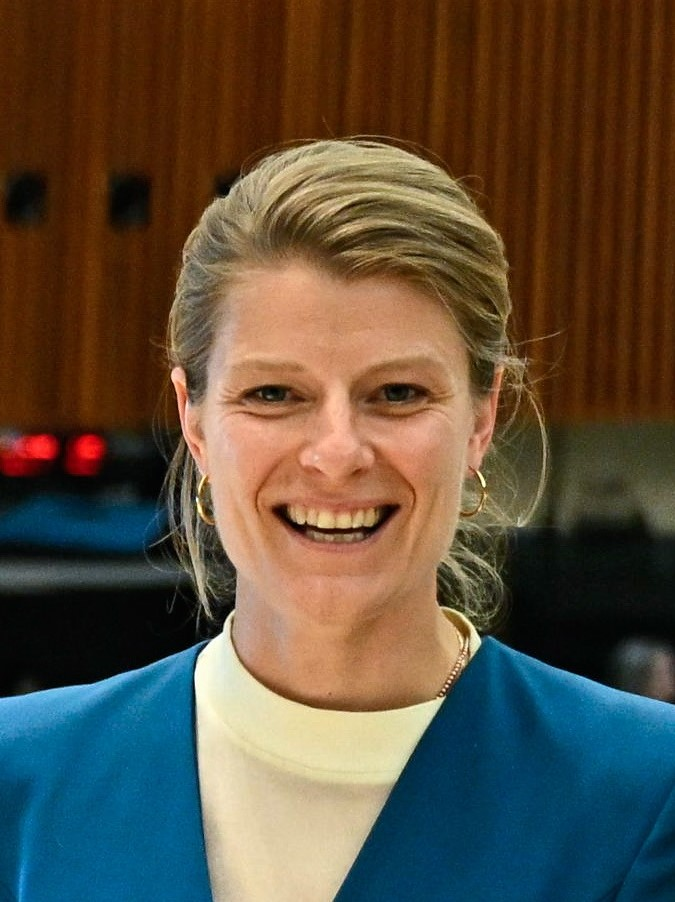
- Incumbent; Ane Halsboe-Jørgensen since 23 September 2025
- Ministry of Employment
- Type: Minister
- Member of: Cabinet; State Council
- Reports to: the Prime minister
- Seat: Slotsholmen
- Appointer: The Monarch (on the advice of the Prime Minister)
- Formation: 9 November 1942; 83 years ago
- First holder: Johannes Kjærbøl
- Succession: depending on the order in the State Council
- Deputy: Permanent Secretary
- Salary: 1.624.503,02 DKK (€217,931), in 2026
- Website: Official website

The minister for employment (Danish: Beskæftigelsesminister) is a Danish minister office. The minister is the labour minister of Denmark and is the political head of the Ministry of Employment of Denmark.

The office was introduced with the Scavenius Cabinet on 9 November 1942. It was called minister of labour (Danish: Arbejdsminister) until 2001.

== List of ministers ==
No.	Portrait	Name (born-died)	Term of office			Political party	Government	Ref.
No.	Portrait	Name (born-died)	Took office	Left office	Time in office	Political party	Government	Ref.
Minister of Labour and Social Affairs (Arbejds- og socialminister)
1		Johannes Kjærbøl (1885–1973)	8 July 1940	9 November 1942	2 years, 124 days	Social Democrats	Stauning VI; Buhl I	
Minister of Labour (Arbejdsminister)
(1)		Johannes Kjærbøl (1885–1973)	9 November 1942	29 August 1943	287 days	Social Democrats	Scavenius	
No Danish government (29 August 1943 (Note: On 29 August 1943, the Danish government resigned, refusing to grant further concessions to Nazi Germany. All government operations were assumed by the permanent secretaries of the individual departments, and this arrangement lasted until the Liberation of Denmark on 5 May 1945. Since King Christian X never accepted the resignation of the government, it existed de jure until a new cabinet was formed on 5 May 1945.) – 5 May 1945). Office is assumed by the permanent secretary.
Minister of Labour and Social Affairs (Arbejds- og socialminister)
2		Hans Hedtoft (1903–1955)	5 May 1945	7 November 1945	186 days	Social Democrats	Buhl II	
3		Søren Peter Larsen (1888–1948)	7 November 1945	24 April 1947	1 year, 168 days	Venstre	Kristensen	
4		Jens Sønderup (1894–1978)	24 April 1947	13 November 1947	203 days	Venstre	Kristensen	
Minister of Labour (Arbejdsminister)
5		Marius Sørensen (1891–1964)	13 November 1947	2 years, 10 days	2 years, 351 days	Social Democrats	Hedtoft I	
Minister of Labour and Housing (Arbejds- og boligminister)
(1)		Johannes Kjærbøl (1885–1973)	23 November 1949	30 October 1950	341 days	Social Democrats	Hedtoft II	
Minister of Labour and Social Affairs (Arbejds- og socialminister)
6		Poul Sørensen (1904–1969)	30 October 1950	30 September 1953	2 years, 335 days	Conservative People's Party	Eriksen	
7		Johan Strøm (1898–1958)	30 September 1953	1 November 1953	32 days	Social Democrats	Hedtoft III	
Minister of Economic Affairs and Labour (Økonomi- og arbejdsminister)
(11)		Jens Otto Krag (1914–1978)	1 November 1953	28 May 1957	3 years, 208 days	Social Democrats	Hedtoft III; Hansen I	
Minister of Labour and Housing (Arbejds- og boligminister)
9		Kaj Bundvad (1904–1976)	28 May 1957	21 February 1960	2 years, 269 days	Social Democrat	Hansen II	
Minister of Labour (Arbejdsminister)
(9)		Kaj Bundvad (1904–1976)	21 February 1960	3 September 1962	2 years, 194 days	Social Democrats	Kampmann I–II	
Minister of Labour and Social Affairs (Arbejds- og socialminister)
(9)		Kaj Bundvad (1904–1976)	3 September 1962	27 August 1963	358 days	Social Democrats	Krag I	
Minister of Labour (Arbejdsminister)
10		Erling Dinesen (1910–1986)	27 August 1963	2 February 1968	5 years, 152 days	Social Democrats	Krag I–II	
11		Lauge Dahlgaard (1919–1996)	2 February 1968	11 October 1971	3 years, 251 days	Social Liberal	Baunsgaard	
(16)		Erling Dinesen (1910–1986)	11 October 1971	19 December 1973	2 years, 69 days	Social Democrats	Krag III; Jørgensen I	
Minister of Labour and Housing (Arbejds- og boligminister)
12		Johan Philipsen (1911–1992)	19 December 1973	13 February 1975	1 year, 56 days	Venstre	Hartling	
Minister of Labour (Arbejdsminister)
(10)		Erling Dinesen (1910–1986)	13 February 1975	8 September 1976	1 year, 208 days	Social Democrats	Jørgensen II	
13		Erling Jensen (1919–2000)	8 September 1976	1 October 1977	1 year, 23 days	Social Democrats	Jørgensen II	
14		Svend Auken (1943–2009)	1 October 1977	10 September 1982	4 years, 344 days	Social Democrats	Jørgensen II–III–IV–V	
15		Grethe Fenger Møller (born 1941)	10 September 1982	12 March 1986	3 years, 183 days	Conservative People's Party	Schlüter I	
16		Henning Dyremose (born 1945)	12 March 1986	30 October 1989	3 years, 232 days	Conservative People's Party	Schlüter I–II–III	
17		Knud Erik Kirkegaard (born 1942)	30 October 1989	25 January 1993	3 years, 87 days	Conservative People's Party	Schlüter III–IV	
18		Jytte Andersen (born 1942)	25 January 1993	23 March 1998	5 years, 57 days	Social Democrats	P. N. Rasmussen I–II–III	
19		Ove Hygum (born 1956)	23 March 1998	27 November 2001	3 years, 249 days	Social Democrats	P. N. Rasmussen IV	
Minister for Employment (Beskæftigelsesminister)
20		Claus Hjort Frederiksen (born 1947)	27 November 2001	7 April 2009	7 years, 131 days	Venstre	A. F. Rasmussen I–II–III	
21		Inger Støjberg (born 1973)	7 April 2009	3 October 2011	2 years, 179 days	Venstre	L. L. Rasmussen I	
22		Mette Frederiksen (born 1977)	3 October 2011	10 October 2014	3 years, 7 days	Social Democrats	Thorning-Schmidt I–II	
23		Henrik Dam Kristensen (born 1957)	10 October 2014	28 June 2015	261 days	Social Democrats	Thorning-Schmidt II	
24		Jørn Neergaard Larsen (born 1949)	28 June 2015	28 November 2016	1 year, 153 days	Venstre	L. L. Rasmussen II	
25		Troels Lund Poulsen (born 1976)	28 November 2016	27 June 2019	2 years, 211 days	Venstre	L. L. Rasmussen III	
26		Peter Hummelgaard Thomsen (born 1983)	27 June 2019	15 December 2022	3 years, 171 days	Social Democrats	Frederiksen I	
27		Ane Halsboe-Jørgensen (born 1983)	15 December 2022	23 September 2025	2 years, 282 days	Social Democrats	Frederiksen II	
28		Kaare Dybvad (born 1984)	23 September 2025	3 June 2026	253 days	Social Democrats	Frederiksen II	
(27)		Ane Halsboe-Jørgensen (born 1983)	3 June 2026	Incumbent	96 days	Social Democrats	Frederiksen III	
