= Frederiksen III Cabinet =

Government of Denmark since 2026

Third cabinet of Mette Frederiksen
- 80th Cabinet of Denmark
- 2026–present
- Date formed: 3 June 2026

People and organisations
- Monarch: Frederik X
- Prime Minister: Mette Frederiksen
- No. of ministers: 21
- Member parties: Social Democrats; Green Left; Moderates; Social Liberals; Supported by: Red–Green Alliance; Alternative; Social Democratic; Union Party; Inuit Ataqatigiit; Naleraq
- Status in legislature: Minority coalition government
- Opposition parties: Venstre; Liberal Alliance; Danish People's Party; Conservatives; Denmark Democrats; Citizens' Party; Independents

History
- Legislature term: 2026–
- Predecessor: Frederiksen II

The third cabinet of Mette Frederiksen (self-styled: firkløverregeringen; lit. 'Four-leaf clover Government') is the Danish government since 3 June 2026, succeeding the previous second Frederiksen cabinet. The government was formed after the 2026 Danish general election. On 1 June 2026, a coalition agreement was reached between the four parties. The agreement itself was presented on 2 June, while the ministers were announced and appointed by royal decree on 3 June. It is the first Danish cabinet to have a majority of women, with 11 out of 21 ministers.

Headed by Prime Minister Mette Frederiksen, it is a centre-left government, consisting of the Social Democrats, the Green Left, the Moderates, and the Social Liberals. It was announced after record-long negotiations lasting 69 days, beating the record previously held by the second Frederiksen cabinet. The government is supported by the Red–Green Alliance and The Alternative. It is also supported by the Social Democratic Party and the Union Party from the Faroe Islands, as well as Inuit Ataqatigiit and Naleraq from Greenland.

== List of ministers ==
Portfolio	Minister	Took office	Left office	Party	Ref
Prime Minister	Mette Frederiksen	27 June 2019	Incumbent	Social Democrats	
Minister of Economic Affairs and the Interior	Pia Olsen Dyhr	3 June 2026	Incumbent	Green Left	
Minister of Foreign Affairs	Lars Løkke Rasmussen	15 December 2022	Incumbent	Moderates	
Minister of Business and Competitiveness (Note: Includes the responsibilities of the Food ministry.)	Martin Lidegaard	3 June 2026	Incumbent	Social Liberals	
Minister of Finance	Peter Hummelgaard	3 June 2026	Incumbent	Social Democrats	
Minister of Justice (Note: Includes smaller portions of responsibilities for the Agriculture ministry.)	Nicolai Wammen	3 June 2026	Incumbent	Social Democrats	
Minister of Science, Higher Education and Digital Affairs	Christina Egelund	15 December 2022	Incumbent	Moderates	
Minister of Climate, Energy and Utilities	Samira Nawa	3 June 2026	Incumbent	Social Liberals	
Minister of Urban, Rural Areas and Transport	Signe Munk	3 June 2026	27 October 2026	Green Left	
Minister of Urban, Rural Areas and Transport	Karina Lorentzen	27 October 2026	Incumbent	Green Left	
Minister of Immigration and Integration	Morten Bødskov	3 June 2026	Incumbent	Social Democrats	
Minister of Education	Magnus Heunicke	3 June 2026	Incumbent	Social Democrats	
Minister of Employment, and Gender Equality (Note: While the ministries are collected, the ministerial titles are officially separate.)	Ane Halsboe-Jørgensen	3 June 2026	Incumbent	Social Democrats	
Minister of Defence	Jeppe Bruus	3 June 2026	Incumbent	Social Democrats	
Minister of Taxation and Economic Growth	Jakob Engel-Schmidt	3 June 2026	Incumbent	Moderates	
Minister for Health and Minister of Ecclesiastical Affairs	Ida Auken	3 June 2026	Incumbent	Social Democrats	
Ministry of Nature and Animal Welfare (Note: The successor to the previous Minister of Green Transition. Also includes the majority of responsibilities for the Agriculture ministry.)	Christian Rabjerg Madsen	3 June 2026	Incumbent	Social Democrats	
Minister of Culture	Zenia Stampe	3 June 2026	Incumbent	Social Liberals	
Minister of Resilience and Preparedness	Lisbeth Bech-Nielsen	3 June 2026	Incumbent	Green Left	
Minister of Children, Senior Citizens, and Housing	Jacob Mark	3 June 2026	Incumbent	Green Left	
Minister for Social Affairs and Minister for Nordic Cooperation	Monika Rubin	3 June 2026	Incumbent	Moderates	
Minister of the Environment (Note: Includes the responsibilities for the Fisheries ministry.)	Maria Reumert Gjerding (Note: Not an MP when appointed.)	3 June 2026	Incumbent	Green Left	

== Notes ==
Preceded by Frederiksen II	Cabinet of Denmark; 2026–	Succeeded by Incumbent
