= Minister for Ecclesiastical Affairs (Denmark) =

Danish cabinet position

Minister of Ecclesiastical Affairs
- Kirkeminister
- State coat of arms of the Kingdom of Denmark

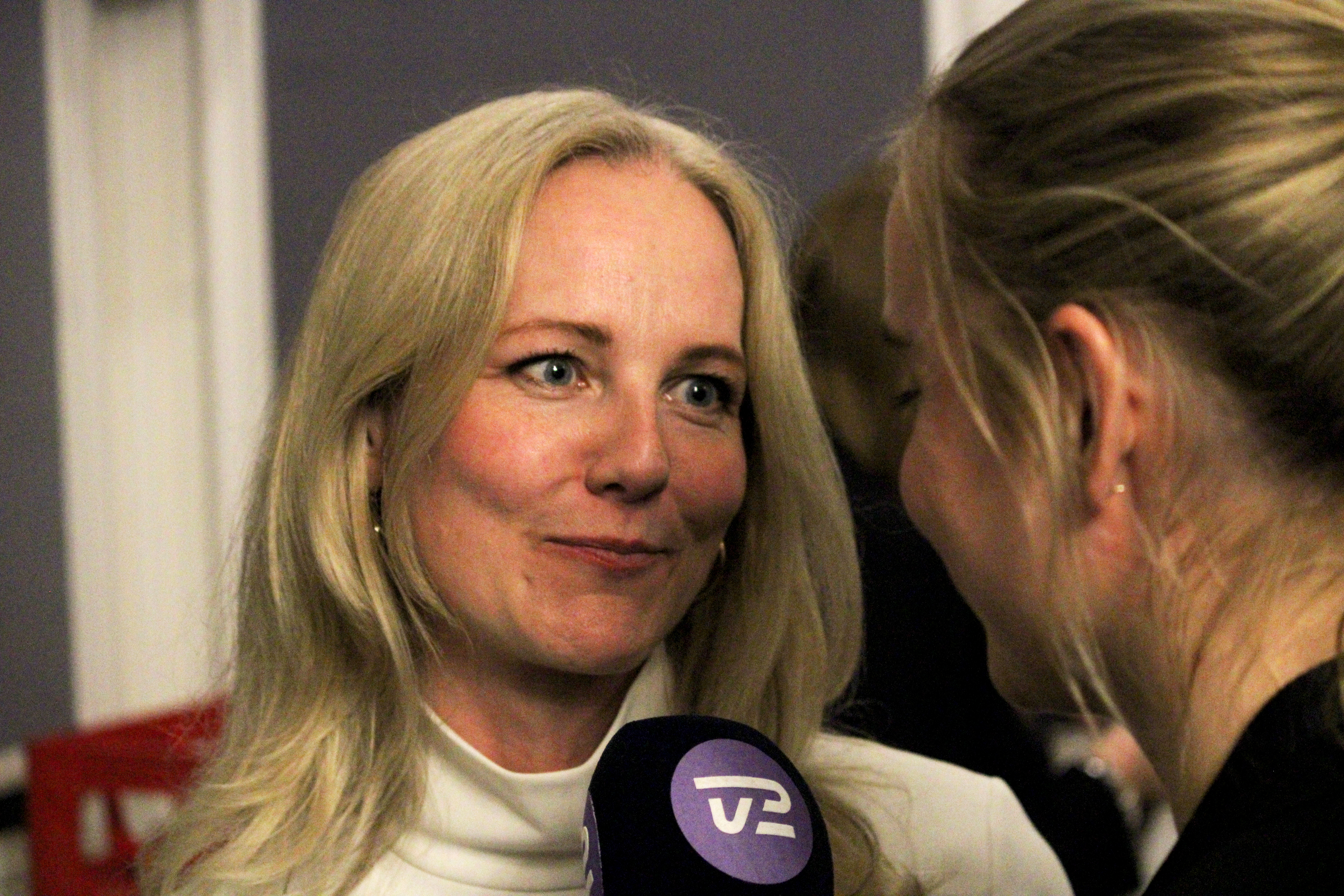
- Incumbent; Ida Auken since 3 June 2026
- Ministry of Ecclesiastical Affairs
- Type: Minister
- Member of: Cabinet; State Council
- Reports to: the Prime minister
- Seat: Slotsholmen
- Appointer: The Monarch (on the advice of the Prime Minister)
- Precursor: Kultus Minister
- Formation: 28 April 1916; 110 years ago
- First holder: Thorvald Povlsen
- Succession: depending on the order in the State Council
- Deputy: Permanent Secretary
- Salary: 1.624.503,02 DKK (€217,931), in 2026
- Website: Official website

Minister of Ecclesiastical Affairs of Denmark (Danish: Kirkeminister, lit. 'Minister of the Church') is a Danish political minister office. The main responsibility of the minister is the Church of Denmark. The minister is politically appointed without any requirements being a member of the state church.

The office was created in 1916 when the post Kultus Minister was split up into the posts of Minister of Education and Minister of Ecclesiastical Affairs. The new Minister of Ecclesiastical Affairs also took over the responsibility for culture from the Kultus Minister. In 1961 responsibility of culture was transferred to the Minister of Cultural Affairs.

Since 3 June 2026, Ida Auken from the Social Democrats, holds the post in the third Frederiksen cabinet.

== List of ministers ==
| No. | Portrait | Name (born–died) | Term of office | | | Political party | Government | Ref. |
| No. | Portrait | Name (born–died) | Took office | Left office | Time in office | Political party | Government | Ref. |
|---|---|---|---|---|---|---|---|---|
| 1 | | Thorvald Povlsen (1870–1948) | 28 April 1916 | 30 March 1920 | 3 years, 337 days | Social Liberal | Zahle II | |
| 2 | | H. Edvard Hass (1866–1946) | 30 March 1920 | 5 April 1920 | 6 days | Independent | Liebe | |
| 3 | | Emil Ammentorp (1862–1947) | 5 April 1920 | 5 May 1920 | 30 days | Independent | Friis | |
| 4 | | Jens Christian Christensen (1856–1930) | 5 May 1920 | 15 August 1922 | 2 years, 102 days | Venstre | Neergaard II | |
| 5 | | Jacob Appel (1866–1931) | 15 August 1922 | 23 April 1924 | 1 year, 252 days | Venstre | Neergaard II–III | |
| 6 | | Niels Peter Lorentsen Dahl (1869–1936) | 23 April 1924 | 14 December 1926 | 2 years, 235 days | Social Democrats | Stauning I | |
| 7 | | Fritz Bruun-Rasmussen (1870–1964) | 14 December 1926 | 30 April 1929 | 2 years, 137 days | Venstre | Madsen-Mygdal | |
| (6) | | Niels Peter Lorentsen Dahl (1869–1936) | 30 April 1929 | 4 November 1935 | 6 years, 188 days | Social Democrats | Stauning II | |
| 8 | | Johannes Hansen (1881–1953) | 4 November 1935 | 8 July 1940 | 4 years, 247 days | Social Democrats | Stauning III–IV–V | |
| 9 | | Vilhelm Fibiger (1886–1978) | 8 July 1940 | 9 November 1942 | 2 years, 124 days | Conservative People's Party | Stauning VI; Buhl I | |
| 10 | | Valdemar Holbøll (1871–1954) | 9 November 1942 | 29 August 1943 | 293 days | Independent | Scavenius | |
No Danish government in between August 29, 1943 and May 5, 1945. Office is assumed by the permanent secretary. (Note: On 29 August 1943, the Danish government resigned, refusing to grant further concessions to Nazi Germany. All government operations were assumed by the permanent secretaries of the individual departments, and this arrangement lasted until the Liberation of Denmark on 5 May 1945. Since King Christian X never accepted the resignation of the government, it existed de jure until a new cabinet was formed on 5 May 1945.)
| 11 | | Arne Sørensen (1906–1978) | 5 May 1945 | 7 November 1945 | 186 days | Danish Unity | Buhl II | |
| – | | Mads Rasmussen Hartling (1885–1960) acting | 7 November 1945 | 12 November 1945 | 5 days | Venstre | Kristensen | |
| 12 | | Carl Martin Hermansen (1897–1976) | 12 November 1945 | 13 November 1947 | 2 years, 1 day | Venstre | Kristensen | |
| 13 | | Frede Nielsen (1891–1954) | 13 November 1947 | 16 September 1950 | 2 years, 307 days | Social Democrats | Hedtoft I | |
| 14 | | Bodil Koch (1903–1972) | 16 September 1950 | 30 October 1950 | 44 days | Social Democrats | Hedtoft II | |
| 15 | | Jens Sønderup (1897–1976) | 30 October 1950 | 13 September 1951 | 318 days | Venstre | Eriksen | |
| (12) | | Carl Martin Hermansen (1897–1976) | 13 September 1951 | 30 September 1953 | 2 years, 17 days | Venstre | Eriksen | |
| (14) | | Bodil Koch (1903–1972) | 30 September 1953 | 28 November 1966 | 13 years, 59 days | Social Democrats | Hedtoft III; Hansen I–II; Kampmann I–II; Krag I–II | |
| 16 | | Orla Møller (1916–1979) | 28 November 1966 | 2 February 1968 | 1 year, 66 days | Social Democrats | Krag II | |
| 17 | | Arne Fog Pedersen (1911–1984) | 2 February 1968 | 11 October 1971 | 3 years, 251 days | Venstre | Baunsgaard | |
| 18 | | Dorte Bennedsen (1938–2016) | 11 October 1971 | 19 December 1973 | 1 year, 351 days | Social Democrats | Krag III; Jørgensen I | |
| 19 | | Kresten Damsgaard (1903–1992) | 19 December 1973 | 29 January 1975 | 1 year, 41 days | Venstre | Hartling | |
| 20 | | Jørgen Peder Hansen (1923–1994) | 13 February 1975 | 30 August 1978 | 3 years, 198 days | Social Democrats | Jørgensen II | |
| 21 | | Egon Jensen (1922–1985) | 30 August 1978 | 26 October 1979 | 1 year, 57 days | Social Democrats | Jørgensen III | |
| (20) | | Jørgen Peder Hansen (1923–1994) | 26 October 1979 | 20 January 1981 | 1 year, 86 days | Social Democrats | Jørgensen IV | |
| 22 | | Tove Lindbo Larsen (1928–2018) | 20 January 1981 | 10 September 1982 | 1 year, 233 days | Social Democrats | Jørgensen IV–V | |
| 23 | | Elsebeth Kock-Petersen (born 1949) | 10 September 1982 | 23 July 1984 | 1 year, 317 days | Venstre | Schlüter I | |
| 24 | | Mette Madsen (1924–2015) | 23 July 1984 | 3 June 1988 | 3 years, 316 days | Venstre | Schlüter I–II | |
| 25 | | Torben Rechendorff (1937–2022) | 3 June 1988 | 25 January 1993 | 4 years, 236 days | Conservative People's Party | Schlüter III–IV | |
| 26 | | Arne O. Andersen (born 1939) | 25 January 1993 | 27 September 1994 | 1 year, 245 days | Centre Democrats | P. N. Rasmussen I | |
| 27 | | Birte Weiss (1941–2026) | 27 September 1994 | 30 December 1996 | 2 years, 94 days | Social Democrats | P. N. Rasmussen II | |
| 28 | | Ole Vig Jensen (1936–2016) | 30 December 1996 | 23 March 1998 | 1 year, 83 days | Social Liberal | P. N. Rasmussen III | |
| 29 | | Margrethe Vestager (born 1968) | 23 March 1998 | 21 December 2000 | 2 years, 273 days | Social Liberal | P. N. Rasmussen IV | |
| 30 | | Johannes Lebech (born 1967) | 21 December 2000 | 27 November 2001 | 341 days | Social Liberal | P. N. Rasmussen IV | |
| 31 | | Tove Fergo (1946–2015) | 27 November 2001 | 18 February 2005 | 3 years, 83 days | Venstre | A. F. Rasmussen I | |
| 32 | | Bertel Haarder (born 1944) | 18 February 2005 | 23 November 2007 | 2 years, 278 days | Venstre | A. F. Rasmussen II | |
| 33 | | Birthe Rønn Hornbech (born 1943) | 23 November 2007 | 8 March 2011 | 3 years, 105 days | Venstre | A. F. Rasmussen III; L. L. Rasmussen I | |
| 34 | | Per Stig Møller (born 1942) | 23 February 2010 | 3 October 2011 | 1 year, 222 days | Conservative People's Party | L. L. Rasmussen I | |
| 35 | | Manu Sareen (born 1967) | 3 October 2011 | 6 December 2012 | 1 year, 64 days | Social Liberal | Thorning-Schmidt I | |
| 36 | | Marianne Jelved (born 1943) | 6 December 2012 | 28 June 2015 | 2 years, 204 days | Social Liberal | Thorning-Schmidt I–II | |
| (32) | | Bertel Haarder (born 1944) | 28 June 2015 | 28 November 2016 | 1 year, 153 days | Venstre | L. L. Rasmussen II | |
| 37 | | Mette Bock (born 1957) | 28 November 2016 | 27 June 2019 | 2 years, 211 days | Liberal Alliance | L. L. Rasmussen III | |
| 38 | | Joy Mogensen (born 1980) | 27 June 2019 | 16 August 2021 | 2 years, 50 days | Social Democrats | Frederiksen I | |
| 39 | | Ane Halsboe-Jørgensen (born 1983) | 16 August 2021 | 15 December 2022 | 1 year, 121 days | Social Democrats | Frederiksen I | |
| 40 | | Louise Schack Elholm (born 1977) | 15 December 2022 | 23 November 2023 | 343 days | Venstre | Frederiksen II | |
| 41 | | Morten Dahlin (born 1989) | 23 November 2023 | 3 June 2026 | 2 years, 192 days | Venstre | Frederiksen II | |
| 42 | | Ida Auken (born 1978) | 3 June 2026 | Incumbent | 96 days | Social Democrats | Frederiksen III | |
