= Bodil Koch =

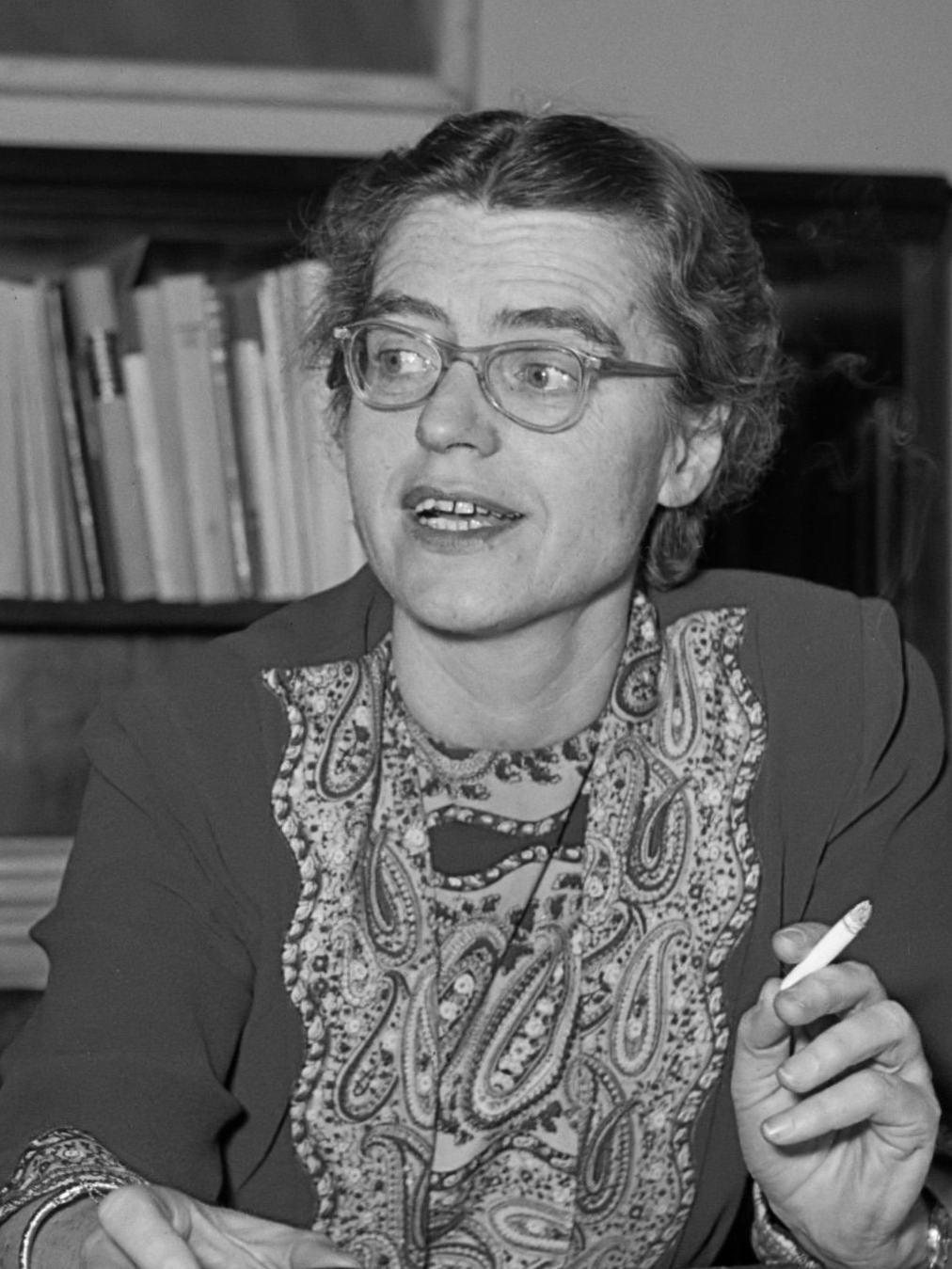
- Koch in 1954

Minister for Cultural Affairs
- In office 28 November 1966 – 2 February 1968
- Prime Minister: Jens Otto Krag
- Preceded by: Hans Sølvhøj
- Succeeded by: Kristen Helveg Petersen

Minister of Ecclesiastical Affairs
- In office 30 September 1953 – 28 November 1966
- Prime Minister: Hans Hedtoft; H. C. Hansen; Viggo Kampmann; Jens Otto Krag
- Preceded by: Carl Martin Hermansen
- Succeeded by: Orla Møller
- In office 16 September 1950 – 30 October 1950
- Prime Minister: Hans Hedtoft
- Preceded by: Frede Nielsen
- Succeeded by: Jens Sønderup

Personal details
- Born: 25 October 1903 Copenhagen, Denmark
- Died: 7 January 1972 (aged 68) Copenhagen, Denmark
- Party: Social Democrats
- Spouse: Hal Koch
- Children: 5, including Dorte Bennedsen and Ejler Koch
- Education: University of Copenhagen
- Occupation: Theologist; Politician

Bodil Koch (25 October 1903 – 7 January 1972) was the wife of a prominent professor, a Social Democrat, and a minister. She was married to professor Hal Koch, an advocate of democracy as a continuing deliberation instead of the majority's rights over the minorities. She represented the Social Democrats in the Danish Parliament, Folketinget from 1947 – 1968.

In 1947, she was elected to the Folketing and three years later she became the first female Minister of Ecclesiastical Affairs in the world and the third female minister in Denmark. She only held the office for six weeks, as Prime Minister Hans Hedtoft resigned 30 October 1950 over a dispute on the continued rationing of butter.

When the Social Democrats returned to the power in 1953, she again was appointed Minister of Ecclesiastical Affairs. She held office until 1966, when she was appointed new Minister of Culture. She held office until Hilmar Baunsgaard in 1968 replaced Jens Otto Krag as prime minister.

== Personal life ==
Bodil Koch graduated from the University of Copenhagen with a master's degree in theology in 1929, the same year she married Hal Koch. Their fundamental beliefs combined the Evangelical-Lutheran view of Christianity with Socratic humanism. Both had a strong interest in traveling and science and working for the common good. They were the icons of a whole generation after World War II searching for a new set of values. They had five children, and during the 1930s Bodil Koch was a stay-at-home mother and the wife of Hal Koch. They challenged the traditional idea of the nuclear family, and eventually she saw the ideal family as two working adults and a number of children who all participated in cooking and debating.

== Political engagement ==
Bodil Koch's engagement in political affairs took off during World War II with op-eds and articles in Danish newspapers and she gave speeches all over the country. In 1944, she and 8 other prominent women founded the grass root organization Folkevirke (The People's Work or National Commitment). The goal of Folkevirke was to mobilize and educate women about democracy on a local, regional, and national level. Women all over the country, from Copenhagen to rural areas in Jutland participated in study groups and gave speeches about the problems of the Danish society.

== Minister of Ecclesiastical Affairs ==
Folkevirke became Bodil Koch's stepping stone to Folketinget. Now that she had been fighting for women to get into politics, she ran for office herself in the 1947 Folketing election. It came as a surprise to many that she as a female, an academic, and practicing Protestant from Copenhagen could be elected in a rural area Herning in Jutland. She became a member of the Danish Parliament for the Social Democrats in 1947, and three years later she became Minister of Ecclesiastical Affairs from September until October 1950. The Social Democrats regained power in 1953, and she was Minister of Ecclesiastical Affairs until 1966 and Minister Cultural Affairs from 1966 until 1968 during three different governments led by the Social Democratic party.

As Minister of Ecclesiastical Affairs, Bodil Koch implemented reforms of ecclesiastical legislation, and she was a fierce defendant of the freedom of preaching in the state church Danish National Church. She worked hard to modernize the church including the ordination of women. After her death her ideas and visions were incorporated the Danish Church Law of 1973.

== A lady in her own right ==
Bodil Koch was highly respected for her work, also by her opponents in Folketinget, and her biographer Birgitte Possing, describes her as "a lady in her own right". She was a great speaker, spontaneous, and very outspoken — also in other political areas than her own. She was from time to time a thorn in the side of her own party, especially in the debate about foreign policy. She was just like Denmark in a foreign policy dilemma: Since 1864 when Denmark was defeated by the Germans the tradition had been that it was too small a country to focus only on military capacity, instead it had to concentrate on socio-economic gains internally. But now Denmark was a member of NATO and the alliance was in the middle of the Cold War. The policy of deterrence worked, but there was a fear in Denmark that the country would be deleted from the map if retaliation was automatically set in action.

In 1949, she grudgingly voted with her party for Denmark's membership of NATO. In 1952 and 1955 she voted against the party line, first against foreign military forces in Denmark during peacetime and second against Western Germany's admission to NATO. She was against the Vietnam War and nuclear rearmament and agitated for an open debate about the relationship between the Eastern and Western blocks during the Cold War in the 1950s and 1960s. Koch became worldwide famous for the first time when she in 1958 publicly criticized the US Secretary of State John Foster Dulles during the NATO conference in Copenhagen, May 1958.

The last two years of her political career Koch was Minister of Cultural Affairs (1966–1968). Her influence on cultural affairs was less than on ecclesiastical affairs, but she had always been interested and knowledgeable about culture and literature.

== Notes ==
Political offices
Preceded by Frede Nielsen	Minister for Ecclesiastical Affairs of Denmark; 16 September 1950 – 30 October 1950	Succeeded by Jens Sønderup
Preceded by Carl Martin Hermansen	Minister for Ecclesiastical Affairs of Denmark; 30 September 1953 – 28 November 1966	Succeeded by Orla Møller
Preceded by Hans Sølvhøj	Culture Minister of Denmark; 28 November 1966 – 2 February 1968	Succeeded by Kristen Helveg Petersen
