= Council for Ethnic Minorities =

Danish advisory institution

The Council for Ethnic Minorities (Danish: Rådet for Etniske Minoriteter) is a Danish institution that advises the government on issues concerning refugees, immigrants and integration. It focuses on, among other things, the education of children and young people, democratic participation and citizenship among ethnic minorities, as well as housing policy and housing areas.

The council consists of 14 members, five of whom are appointed by the Minister of Social Affairs and the Interior, five others (including the chairperson) are elected by the Board of Representatives, and the last four are appointed by Denmark's four largest municipalities. The chairman of the council is social worker and researcher Halima El Abassi. The Council has a secretariat anchored in the Danish Agency for International Recruitment and Integration.

The council draws up consultation responses to the government, arranges conferences, prepares debate papers and publishes publications within the council's area of work.

== History ==
The council's history dates back to 1983, when a liaison committee was set up under the Ministry of the Interior to advise the Government's Immigration Committee on general immigration policy issues. In 1985, the contact committee was replaced by the Immigration Council, which in 1994 changed its name to the Council for Ethnic Minorities. The legislation on the council has since been amended several times, most recently in 2014, when an amendment to the Danish Integration Act, among other things, laid down the current rules for the appointment of council members.
