= Jens Sønderup =

Danish politician (1894–1978)

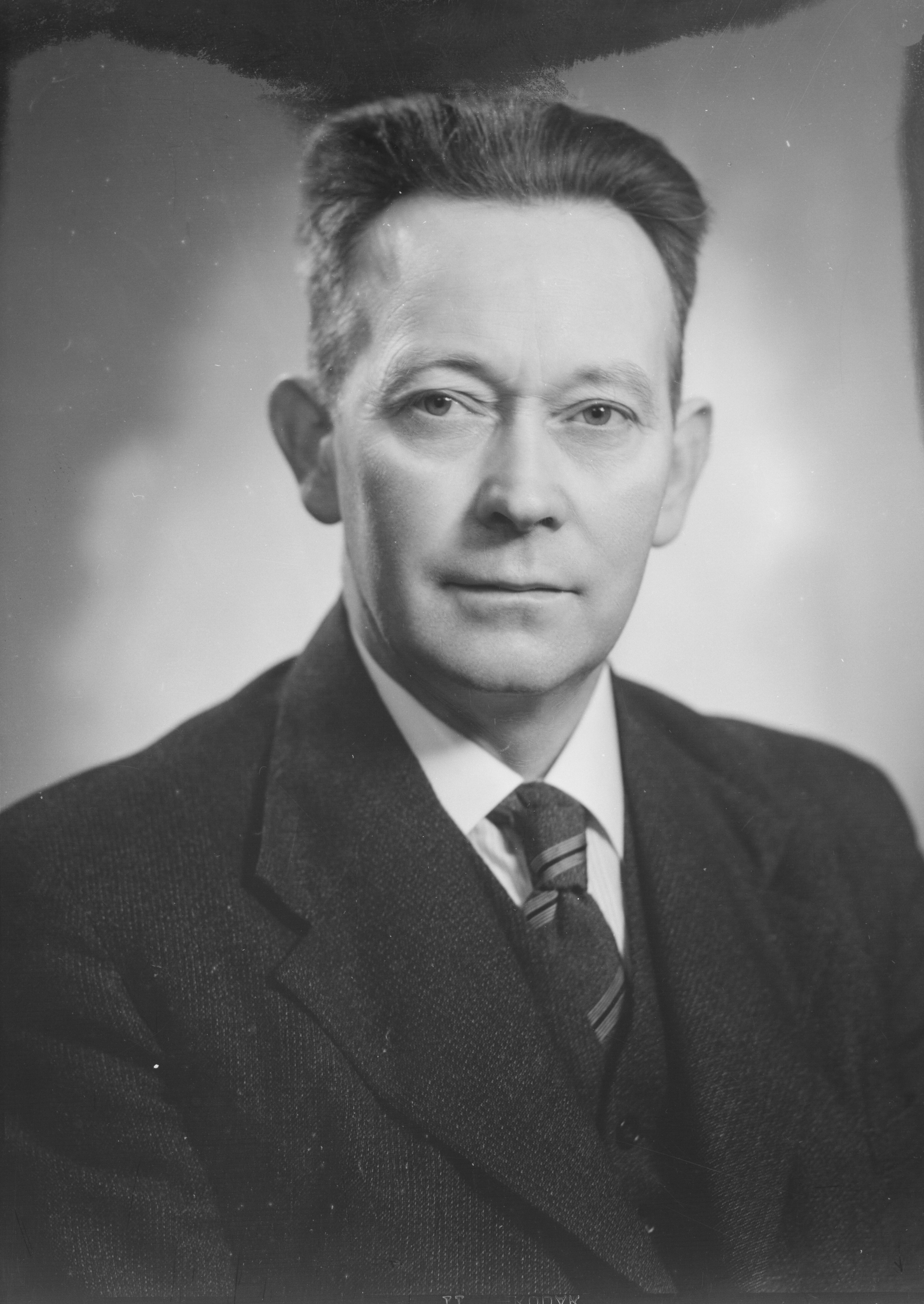

Minister of Agriculture
- In office 13 September 1951 – 30 September 1953
- Prime Minister: Erik Eriksen
- Preceded by: Henrik Hauch
- Succeeded by: Jens Smørum

Minister of Ecclesiastical Affairs
- In office 30 October 1950 – 13 September 1951
- Prime Minister: Erik Eriksen
- Preceded by: Bodil Koch
- Succeeded by: Carl Martin Hermansen

Minister of Labour and Social Affairs
- In office 24 April 1947 – 13 November 1947
- Prime Minister: Knud Kristensen
- Preceded by: Søren Peter Larsen
- Succeeded by: Marius Sørensen

Personal details
- Born: 2 February 1894
- Died: 22 March 1978 (aged 84)
- Party: Venstre

Jens Sønderup (2 February 1894 – 22 March 1978) was a Danish politician who served as Member of the Folketing and held several ministerial positions.
