= Johannes Kjærbøl =

Danish politician (1885–1973)

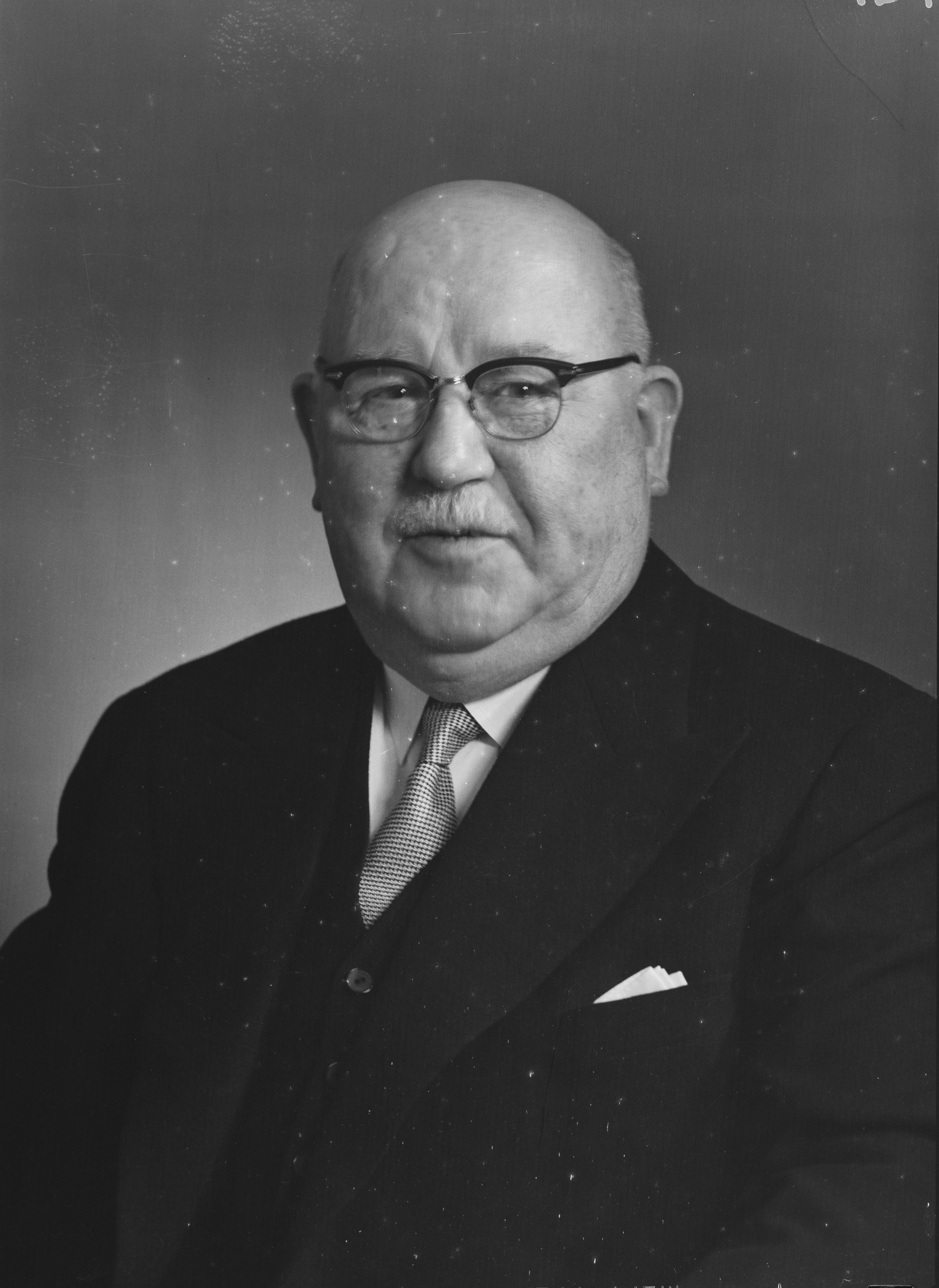
- Kjærbøl c. 1953–1955

Member of the Folketing
- In office 22 October 1935 – 14 May 1957
- Constituency: Southern

Personal details
- Born: 23 December 1885 Copenhagen, Denmark
- Died: 26 August 1973 (aged 87) Copenhagen, Denmark
- Resting place: Vestre cemetery, Copenhagen, Denmark
- Party: Social Democrats
- Spouses: Olga Amalie Petersen (m. 1910; died 1916); Karna Marie Caroline Nielsen (m. 1917, divorced); Gerda Poulsen (m. 1942)

Johannes Kjærbøl (1885–1973) was a Danish politician. He was a member of the Social Democrats and served as Member of the Folketing from 1935 to 1957. He held various cabinet posts between 1935 and 1959.

== Early life and education ==
Kjærbøl was born in Copenhagen on 23 December 1885. His parents were parish priest Johannes Meller Valeur and Julie Severine Hansen.

Kjærbøl was educated as a blacksmith at a municipal school.

== Career ==
Between 1926 and 1935 Kjærbøl was the chairman of the Danish Blacksmiths' and Machine Workers' Association. He was elected as a member of the Parliament for the Social Democrats on 22 October 1935 and served there until 14 May 1957. He was the minister of trade, industry and shipping from 4 November 1935 to 8 July 1940 in the cabinet led by Thorvald Stauning. He was appointed minister of labour and social affairs on 8 July 1940 and remained in office until 9 November 1942. He was the minister of labour from 9 November 1942 to 5 May 1945. Then he was named as the head of Refugee Administration in 1945 which he held until 1952.

Kjærbøl served briefly as the minister for construction and health between 13 November and 23 November 1947. Then he was appointed minister for construction and housing on 23 November 1947, being the first Danish politician to serve in office. He held the post until 23 November 1949. He was also named as the minister of labor and housing on 23 November 1949, and his term ended on 30 October 1950. He served in these posts under Prime Minister Hans Hedtoft. He was the minister of the interior and housing from 30 September 1953 to 30 August 1955. Next he was appointed both minister for Greenland and minister of housing on 30 August 1955 to the cabinet led by H. C. Hansen. When MS Hans Hedtoft sank in 1959 on its way to Greenland, a total of 95 people died. Kjærbøl was accused of not taking into consideration the risks of the journey although he had been informed about these negative conditions. Kjærbøl's successor as minister of Greenland was Kai Lindberg.

== Personal life and death ==
Kjærbøl married Olga Amalie Petersen on 30 October 1910. His wife died in 1916, and he married Karna Marie Caroline Nielsen on 5 August 1917. They divorced later. Kjærbøl's third wife was Gerda Poulsen with who he married on 25 July 1942.

Kjærbøl died in Copenhagen on died 26 August 1973 and was buried in the Vestre cemetery.

=== Work ===
Kjærbøl published his memoirs under the title Modvind og medbør in 1959.
