= Svend Erik Hovmand =

Danish politician

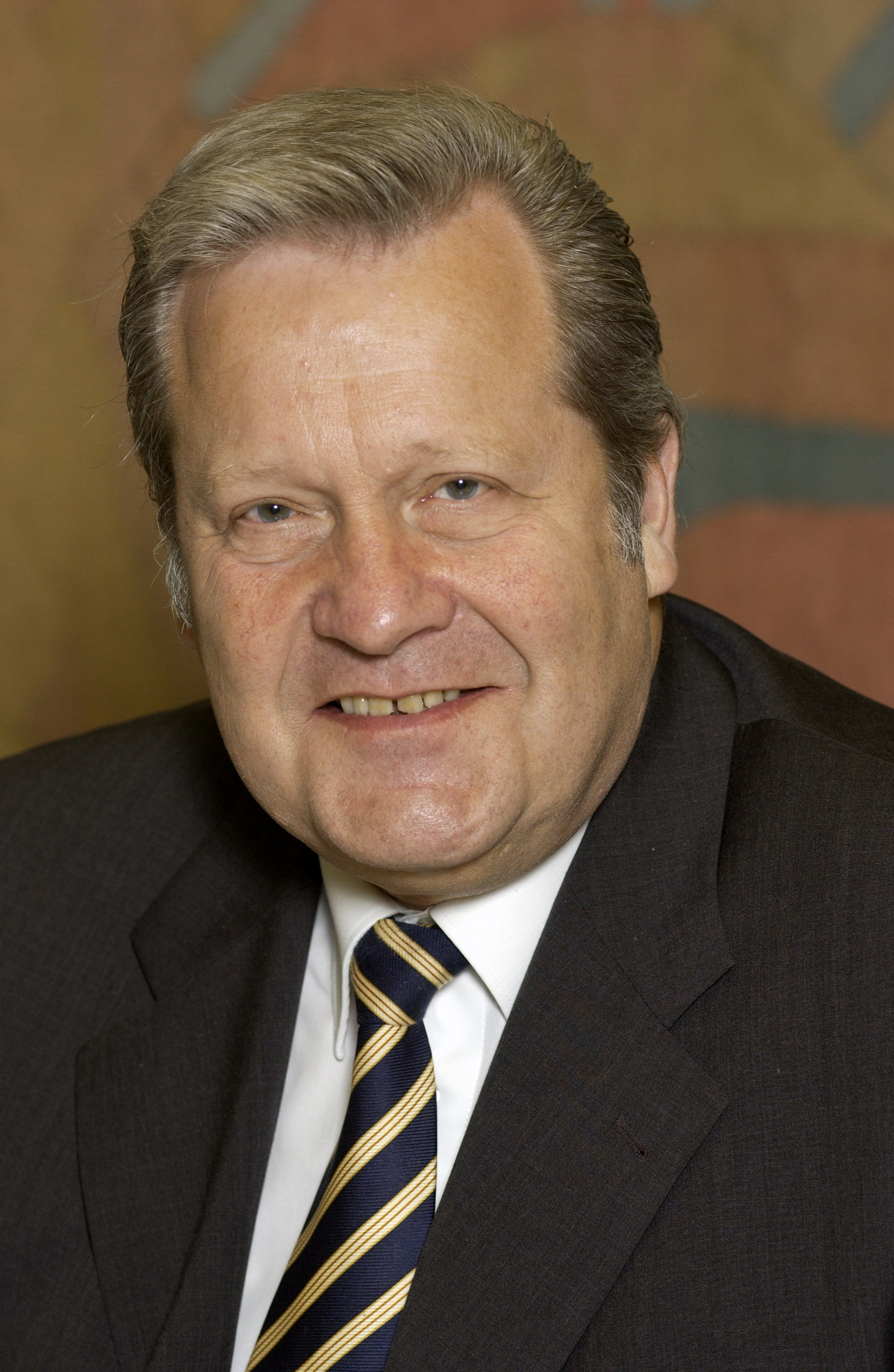
Svend Erik Hovmand, 2003

Svend Erik Hovmand (born 8 December 1945, in Sakskøbing) is former member of Folketinget, the Danish parliament. He was representing the Liberal Party. He was Tax Minister in the Cabinet of Anders Fogh Rasmussen I from 27 November 2001 to 2 August 2004, when he was replaced by Kristian Jensen. He has been a member of parliament (Folketinget) since 9 January 1975. He was President of the Nordic Council in 2001.

Political offices
Preceded by Knud Enggaard	Energy Minister of Denmark; 12 March 1986 – 3 June 1988	Succeeded by Jens Bilgrav-Nielsen
Preceded by Agnete Laustsen	Housing Minister of Denmark; 18 December 1990 – 15 January 1993	Succeeded by Flemming Kofod-Svendsen
Preceded by Frode Sørensen	Tax Minister of Denmark; 27 November 2001 – 2 August 2004	Succeeded by Kristian Jensen
