= Jacob Mark =

Danish politician (born 1991)

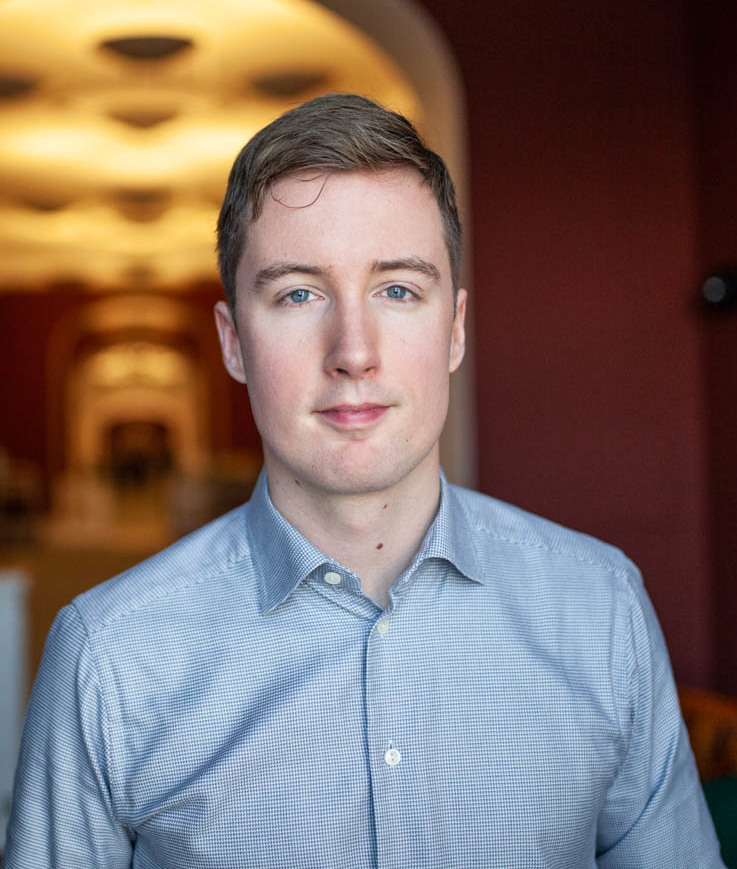

Member of the Folketing
- Incumbent
- Assumed office 24 March 2026
- Constituency: North Zealand
- In office 18 June 2015 – 1 December 2024
- Succeeded by: Mads Olsen
- Constituency: Zealand

Minister of Children, Elderly, and Housing
- Incumbent
- Assumed office 3 June 2026
- Prime Minister: Mette Frederiksen
- Preceded by: Mattias Tesfaye (Children); Henrik Frandsen (Elderly); Sophie Hæstorp Andersen (Housing)

Personal details
- Born: Jacob Rene Mark; 16 October 1991 (age 34) Køge, Denmark
- Party: Green Left

Jacob Rene Mark (born 16 October 1991) is a Danish politician, who is a member of the Cabinet of Denmark. He was a member of the Folketing for the Green Left. He was first elected into parliament at the 2015 Danish general election, and got elected again at the 2026 Danish general election after a 2 year break.

== Political career ==
Mark sat in the municipal council of Køge Municipality from 2010 to 2015. In 2015 he was elected into parliament, receiving 2,948 personal votes at the general election. He was re-elected in 2019 with 23,213 votes.

On 3 June 2026, he was appointed to the Frederiksen III Cabinet.
