= Lotte Bundsgaard =

Danish journalist and politician

Member of Parliament
- In office 1998–2007

Minister for Towns and Homes and Minister for Equal Rights
- In office 21 December 2000 – 27 November 2001

Personal details
- Born: 20 January 1973 (age 53) Nivå, Denmark
- Party: Social Democrats (Denmark)
- Occupation: Schoolteacher, journalist and politician

Lotte Bundsgaard (born 20 January 1973) is a Danish schoolteacher, journalist and politician.

She was born in Nivå to Jørgen Bundsgaard and Hanne Lund Bundsgaard. She married Søren Thorsager in 1999. She was elected member of Folketinget for the Social Democrats from 1998 to 2007. She was Minister for Towns and Homes and Minister for Equal Rights in Poul Nyrup Rasmussen's fourth cabinet from December 2000 to November 2001.

Bundsgaard was educated as a schoolteacher at Odense Seminarium and worked as a schoolteacher before she was elected to Folketinget. After her political career, she graduated as cand.public. from the University of Southern Denmark and has worked as a journalist.
