= Monika Rubin =

Danish politician (born 1987)

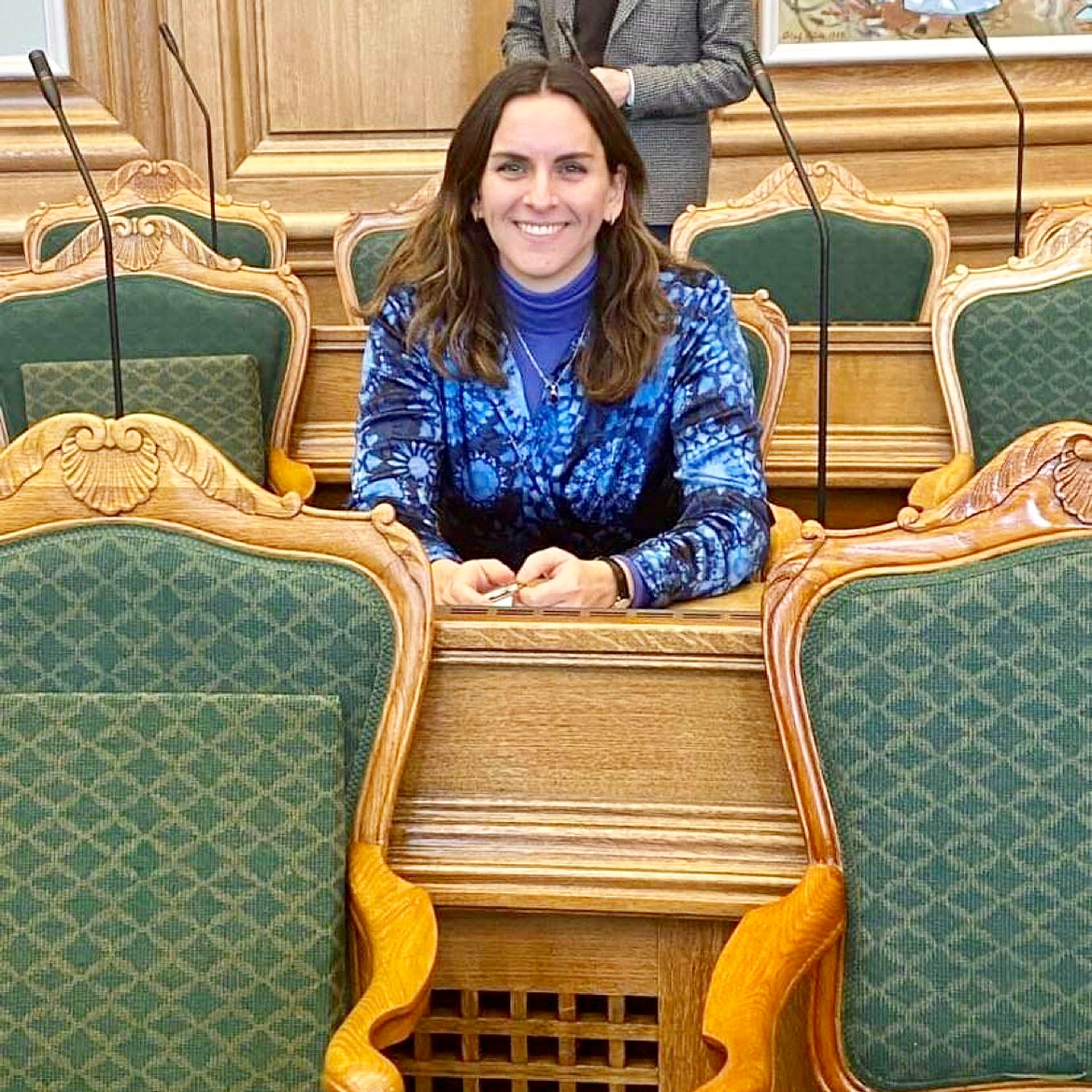
- Rubin in 2019

Member of the Folketing
- Incumbent
- Assumed office 1 November 2022
- Constituency: Copenhagen

Personal details
- Born: 20 December 1987 (age 38) Hvidovre, Denmark
- Party: Moderates
- Occupation: Politician

Monika Rubin (born 20 December 1987) is a Danish politician and Member of the Folketing for Copenhagen from the Moderates. Alongside sixteen other members of The Moderates, Rubin was elected to the Folketing in November 2022.

== See also ==
- List of members of the Folketing, 2022–present
