= Aksel Møller =

Danish politician (1906–1958)

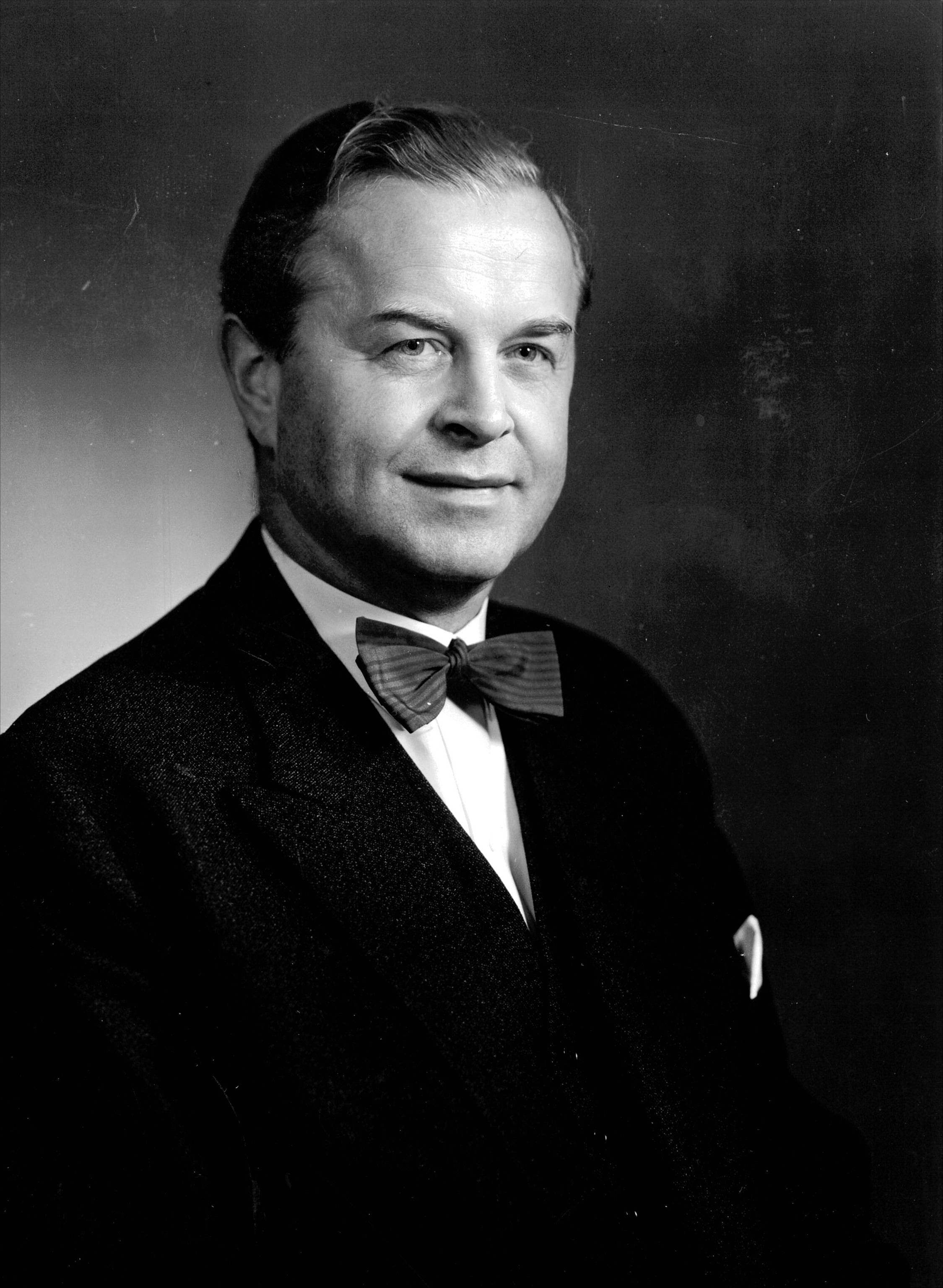

Minister of Interior and Housing
- In office 30 October 1950 – 30 September 1953
- Prime Minister: Erik Eriksen

Personal details
- Born: January 1906 Asminderød, Denmark
- Died: 20 March 1958 (aged 52) Frederiksberg, Denmark
- Party: Conservative People's Party
- Spouse: Gred Elise Westergren

Aksel Møller (1906–1958) was a leading Danish politician known for his contributions to the conservative thought in Denmark after World War II. He served as the minister of interior from 1950 to 1953 and as the parliament speaker of the Conservative People's Party from 1955 to 1958. He was also a member of the Parliament between 1939 and 1958.

== Early life and education ==
Møller was born in Asminderød, Fredensborg, in January 1906. He hailed from a conservative family. Poul Møller was his brother.

Aksel Møller started his political career in the late 1920s when he joined the Conservative Students and Young Conservatives (KU) groups. He edited the KU publications and also, a journal entitled Vor Tid.

Møller received a master's degree in political science in 1933.

== Career and activities ==
Møller became a member of the Frederiksberg city council in 1937 and was one of the figures which made Frederiksberg a conservative area. He was first elected to the Parliament for the Conservative People's Party in April 1939 and served there until his death in 1958. He was also a member of the Church Committee which had been established in 1920.

Møller founded an organization named the Danish Youth Association during the occupation of Denmark by Nazi Germany. The association was a supporter of the occupying forces until 1943, and he was briefly arrested by the Nazis the same year.

Møller was elected as the mayor of Frederiksberg in 1948 and remained in office until 1950. He was the minister of interior and housing in the cabinet led by Erik Eriksen between 30 October 1950 and 30 September 1953. Møller was again elected as the mayor of Frederiksberg in 1954, and his tenure ended in 1958. He also became the chairman of the Conservative People's Party's parliamentary group in 1955 which he held until 1958.

=== Views ===
Møller was among the ideologists of the Conservative People's Party. His approach was known as national conservatism in the 1930s which opposed both socialism and liberalism. He argued that conservatism was not an ideology in that the latter was a theoretical construct. For him it was middle-classes which could improve and protect the social development. He emphasized the significance of the familial piousness. In the mid-1950s he began to oppose the idea of the welfare state.

== Personal life and death ==
Møller married Gred Elise Westergren in Malmö on 16 May 1931. He died in Frederiksberg on 20 March 1958 and was buried in Frederiksberg Ældre Kirkegård.
