= Ministry of Social Affairs (Denmark) =

Government ministry of Denmark

Ministry of Social Affairs and Housing
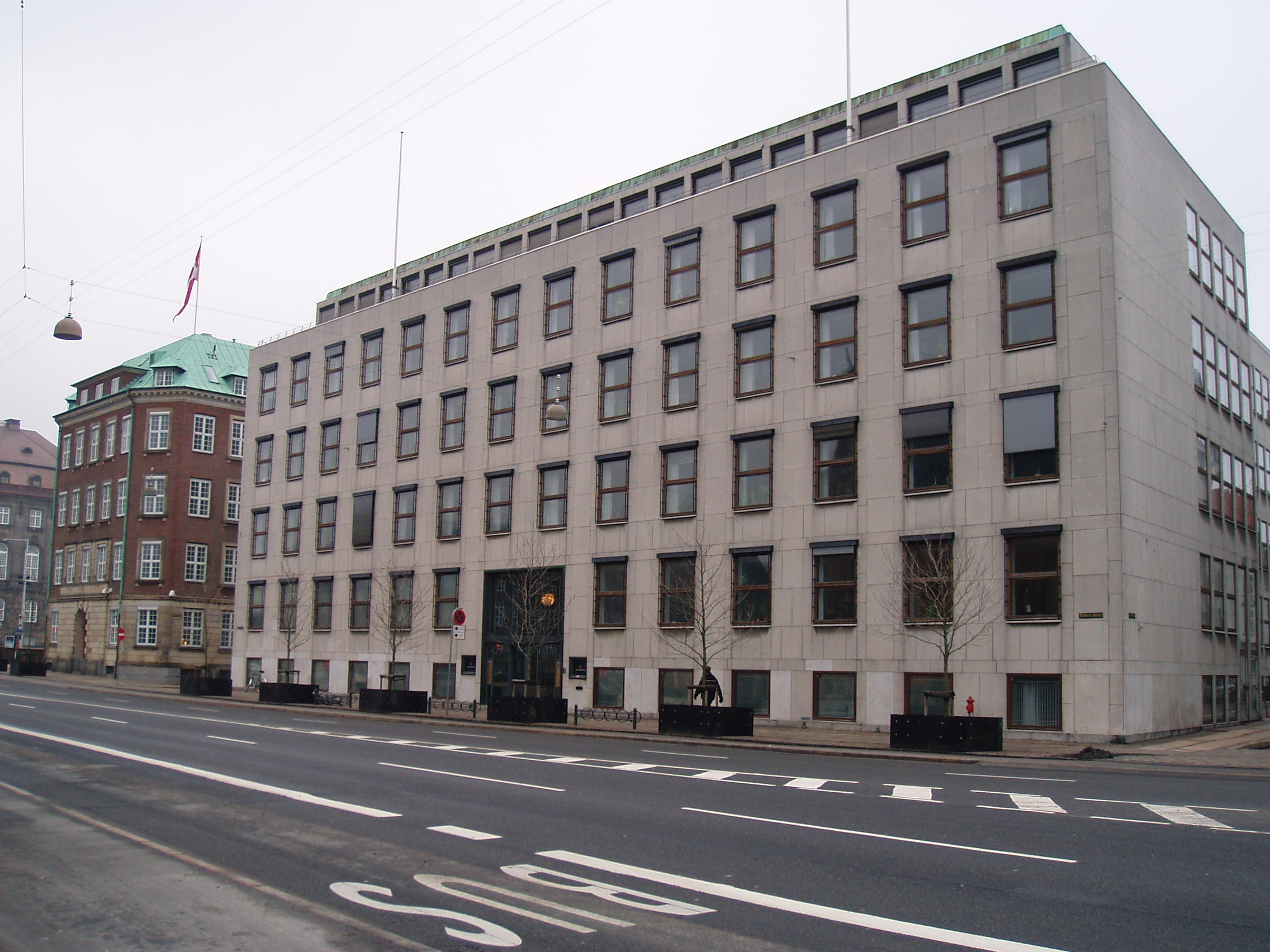
- Headquarters of the ministry on Holmens Kanal

Agency overview
- Formed: 23 April 1924
- Jurisdiction: Government of Denmark
- Headquarters: 22 Holmens Kanal, Copenhagen
- Agency executive: Sophie Hæstorp Andersen, Minister of Social Affairs
- Child agency: Council for Ethnic Minorities
- Website: https://www.sm.dk

The Ministry of Social Affairs (Danish: Socialministeriet) is a Danish cabinet ministry responsible for policies related to the social welfare of the inhabitants of Denmark. As of 2025, it is responsible for the following policy areas: disability law, family law, public housing, social exclusion, social vulnerability, and the voluntary sector.

A ministry of social affairs was first established in Denmark in 1924. It has been re-organized, re-established, and renamed several times since. The ministry was established under its current name, the Ministry of Social Affairs and Housing (Danish: Social- og Boligministeriet), in 2024. The current minister is Sophie Hæstorp Andersen.

== History ==
The Ministry of Social Affairs was first established in 1924, under the first government led by the Social Democrats, Thorvald Stauning's first cabinet. The ministry overtook responsibility for social affairs, international social policy, child welfare, and mental health services—roles which previously fell within the purview of the Ministry of the Interior, the Ministry of Justice, and the Ministry of Education.

The ministry was abolished in 1926 when Stauning's cabinet was succeeded by the Venstre Party. When Stauning came back to power in 1929, the ministry was re-established. In 1940, the responsibility for labor law was separated from the ministry, forming the Ministry of Labor. Between 1945–1947 and 1950–1953 the two ministries were merged.

In 2007, the ministry was replaced by the Ministry of Welfare (Danish: Velfærdsministeriet) and the Ministry of Health and Prevention. The Ministry of Social Affairs was re-established in February 2010, taking over the roles of the Ministry of Welfare. This included the supervision of the Sikringsstyrelsen, a directorate which worked to secure citizens' social rights, including in the form of international pension and social security, across national borders.

With the formation of Helle Thorning-Schmidt's first cabinet in October 2011, the ministry was renamed the Ministry of Social Affairs and Integration, and took over responsibility for integration policy from the Ministry of Refugees, Immigrants and Integration (Danish: Ministeriet for Flygtninge, Indvandrere og Integration). The name of the ministry again changed in 2013 to the Ministry of Social Affairs, Children and Integration when it overtook responsibility for child welfare from the Ministry of Education. In 2014, its name was changed to the Ministry of Children, Equality, Integration and Social Affairs and in 2015 it was renamed the Ministry of Social Affairs and the Interior.

In 2016, the ministry was briefly reformed as the Ministry of Children and Social Affairs before returning to be the Ministry of Social Affairs and the Interior in 2019. In 2021 the ministry was renamed as the Ministry of Social Affairs and Elderly Affairs. In 2022, the ministry merged with the Ministry for Housing to form the Ministry of Social Affairs, Housing, and Elderly Affairs. In 2024, an independent Ministry of Elderly Affairs was formed and separated from the Ministry of Social Affairs and Housing.
