= Slots (nomination district) =

- Slots
- Nomination district constituency for the Folketing
- Location of Slots within Copenhagen

- Location of Copenhagen within Denmark
- Municipalities: Frederiksberg
- Constituency: Copenhagen
- Electorate: 37,032 (2022)

Current constituency
- Created: 1915

Slots nominating district is one of the 92 nominating districts that exists for Danish elections following the 2007 municipal reform. It is one of the 2 nominating districts in Frederiksberg Municipality, the other being Falkoner. It was created in 1915 and has maintained its boundaries since then.

In general elections, the district is a strong area for parties commonly associated with the red bloc.

== General elections results ==
=== General elections in the 2020s ===
2022 Danish general election

Parties	Vote		
Parties	Votes	%	+ / -
Social Democrats	6,330	20.31	+3.32
Venstre	3,340	10.72	-7.54
Red–Green Alliance	3,259	10.46	-1.77
Moderates	3,097	9.94	New
Green Left	3,037	9.74	-0.38
Liberal Alliance	2,861	9.18	+6.13
Conservatives	2,769	8.88	-0.87
Social Liberals	2,205	7.07	-9.04
The Alternative	2,039	6.54	+1.87
Denmark Democrats	608	1.95	New
Independent Greens	504	1.62	New
Danish People's Party	501	1.61	-2.66
New Right	478	1.53	+0.04
Christian Democrats	82	0.26	-0.57
Flemming Blicher	44	0.14	New
Tom Gillesberg	13	0.04	+0.01
Total	31,167		

=== General elections in the 2010s ===
2019 Danish general election

Parties	Vote		
Parties	Votes	%	+ / -
Venstre	5,762	18.26	+5.04
Social Democrats	5,361	16.99	-5.23
Social Liberals	5,084	16.11	+6.43
Red–Green Alliance	3,860	12.23	-0.08
Green Left	3,194	10.12	+4.49
Conservatives	3,076	9.75	+3.84
The Alternative	1,474	4.67	-3.98
Danish People's Party	1,348	4.27	-6.92
Liberal Alliance	962	3.05	-7.59
New Right	471	1.49	New
Stram Kurs	369	1.17	New
Klaus Riskær Pedersen Party	292	0.93	New
Christian Democrats	263	0.83	+0.46
Pierre Tavares	27	0.09	New
Tom Gillesberg	11	0.03	0.00
John Erik Wagner	4	0.01	0.00
John Jørgensen	4	0.01	New
Tommy Schou Christesen	0	0.00	New
Total	31,562		

2015 Danish general election

Parties	Vote		
Parties	Votes	%	+ / -
Social Democrats	6,995	22.22	+4.55
Venstre	4,161	13.22	-4.88
Red–Green Alliance	3,877	12.31	+0.45
Danish People's Party	3,524	11.19	+3.26
Liberal Alliance	3,349	10.64	+3.82
Social Liberals	3,049	9.68	-7.49
The Alternative	2,724	8.65	New
Conservatives	1,861	5.91	-3.48
Green Left	1,772	5.63	-5.07
Christian Democrats	116	0.37	+0.07
Kashif Ahmad	46	0.15	New
Tom Gillesberg	8	0.03	+0.02
John Erik Wagner	2	0.01	+0.01
Jan Elkjær	1	0.00	New
Total	31,485		

2011 Danish general election

Parties	Vote		
Parties	Votes	%	+ / -
Venstre	5,737	18.10	+2.92
Social Democrats	5,599	17.67	-4.37
Social Liberals	5,442	17.17	+8.23
Red–Green Alliance	3,758	11.86	+7.18
Green Left	3,390	10.70	-6.75
Conservatives	2,977	9.39	-6.86
Danish People's Party	2,513	7.93	-2.10
Liberal Alliance	2,161	6.82	+2.01
Christian Democrats	95	0.30	-0.28
Klaus Trier Tuxen	10	0.03	New
Mads Vestergaard	4	0.01	New
Tom Gillesberg	2	0.01	0.00
Morten Versner	1	0.00	New
John Erik Wagner	0	0.00	0.00
Per Zimmermann	0	0.00	New
Total	31,689		

=== General elections in the 2000s ===
2007 Danish general election

Parties	Vote		
Parties	Votes	%	+ / -
Social Democrats	6,635	22.04	+0.88
Green Left	5,254	17.45	+9.96
Conservatives	4,893	16.25	-0.59
Venstre	4,570	15.18	-3.66
Danish People's Party	3,019	10.03	+0.03
Social Liberals	2,691	8.94	-8.51
New Alliance	1,449	4.81	New
Red–Green Alliance	1,410	4.68	-0.88
Christian Democrats	175	0.58	-0.65
Tom Gillesberg	3	0.01	New
Vibeke Baden Laursen	2	0.01	New
Nicolai Krogh Mittet	2	0.01	New
Amir Becirovic	1	0.00	New
John Erik Wagner	0	0.00	New
Total	30,104		

2005 Danish general election

Parties	Vote		
Parties	Votes	%	+ / -
Social Democrats	6,153	21.16	-3.68
Venstre	5,478	18.84	-3.71
Social Liberals	5,072	17.45	+8.13
Conservatives	4,897	16.84	+0.21
Danish People's Party	2,906	10.00	+0.64
Green Left	2,177	7.49	-1.01
Red–Green Alliance	1,616	5.56	+1.17
Christian Democrats	359	1.23	-0.54
Centre Democrats	301	1.04	-1.34
Minority Party	113	0.39	New
Total	29,072		

2001 Danish general election

Parties	Vote		
Parties	Votes	%	+ / -
Social Democrats	7,488	24.84	-4.48
Venstre	6,799	22.55	+4.94
Conservatives	5,013	16.63	-0.05
Danish People's Party	2,822	9.36	+2.05
Social Liberals	2,810	9.32	+2.20
Green Left	2,561	8.50	-1.39
Red–Green Alliance	1,322	4.39	-0.33
Centre Democrats	716	2.38	-1.82
Christian People's Party	533	1.77	-0.08
Progress Party	82	0.27	-0.74
Total	30,146		

=== General elections in the 1990s ===
1998 Danish general election

Parties	Vote		
Parties	Votes	%	+ / -
Social Democrats	8,669	29.32	+1.73
Venstre	5,206	17.61	+2.84
Conservatives	4,931	16.68	-9.11
Green Left	2,924	9.89	-0.14
Danish People's Party	2,162	7.31	New
Social Liberals	2,106	7.12	+0.46
Red–Green Alliance	1,394	4.72	-0.94
Centre Democrats	1,242	4.20	+1.21
Christian People's Party	547	1.85	+0.54
Progress Party	299	1.01	-4.06
Democratic Renewal	83	0.28	New
Total	29,563		

1994 Danish general election

Parties	Vote		
Parties	Votes	%	+ / -
Social Democrats	8,033	27.59	-5.65
Conservatives	7,509	25.79	+0.14
Venstre	4,301	14.77	+5.47
Green Left	2,920	10.03	-1.43
Social Liberals	1,940	6.66	+2.63
Red–Green Alliance	1,647	5.66	+2.53
Progress Party	1,477	5.07	+1.76
Centre Democrats	871	2.99	-0.89
Christian People's Party	380	1.31	-0.39
Ebba Bigler	35	0.12	New
Total	29,113		

1990 Danish general election

Parties	Vote		
Parties	Votes	%	+ / -
Social Democrats	9,189	33.24	+8.80
Conservatives	7,091	25.65	-3.85
Green Left	3,169	11.46	-6.55
Venstre	2,570	9.30	+5.01
Social Liberals	1,113	4.03	-2.48
Centre Democrats	1,074	3.88	+0.76
Progress Party	915	3.31	-3.05
Red–Green Alliance	865	3.13	New
Common Course	705	2.55	+0.47
Christian People's Party	469	1.70	+0.43
The Greens	317	1.15	-0.93
Justice Party of Denmark	159	0.58	New
Humanist Party	9	0.03	New
Total	27,645		

=== General elections in the 1980s ===
1988 Danish general election

Parties	Vote		
Parties	Votes	%	+ / -
Conservatives	8,465	29.50	+0.63
Social Democrats	7,012	24.44	+0.86
Green Left	5,169	18.01	-1.42
Social Liberals	1,868	6.51	-0.30
Progress Party	1,825	6.36	+2.78
Venstre	1,232	4.29	+1.37
Centre Democrats	895	3.12	-0.48
The Greens	597	2.08	-0.15
Common Course	596	2.08	-0.27
Christian People's Party	365	1.27	-0.43
Communist Party of Denmark	364	1.27	-0.05
Left Socialists	307	1.07	-1.69
Total	28,695		

1987 Danish general election

Parties	Vote		
Parties	Votes	%	+ / -
Conservatives	8,449	28.87	-2.25
Social Democrats	6,901	23.58	-5.93
Green Left	5,687	19.43	+4.15
Social Liberals	1,994	6.81	+1.76
Centre Democrats	1,054	3.60	+0.59
Progress Party	1,049	3.58	+1.24
Venstre	854	2.92	-0.85
Left Socialists	809	2.76	-2.45
Common Course	688	2.35	New
The Greens	653	2.23	New
Christian People's Party	496	1.70	-0.14
Communist Party of Denmark	386	1.32	+0.25
Justice Party of Denmark	130	0.44	-1.26
Humanist Party	83	0.28	New
Marxist–Leninists Party	15	0.05	+0.03
Socialist Workers Party	14	0.05	-0.02
Total	29,262		

1984 Danish general election

Parties	Vote		
Parties	Votes	%	+ / -
Conservatives	9,528	31.12	+5.28
Social Democrats	9,035	29.51	-1.58
Green Left	4,679	15.28	+0.97
Left Socialists	1,596	5.21	+0.18
Social Liberals	1,545	5.05	+0.81
Venstre	1,155	3.77	+1.37
Centre Democrats	923	3.01	-2.41
Progress Party	718	2.34	-4.17
Christian People's Party	564	1.84	+0.35
Justice Party of Denmark	521	1.70	+0.21
Communist Party of Denmark	328	1.07	-0.79
Socialist Workers Party	22	0.07	-0.03
Marxist–Leninists Party	7	0.02	New
Total	30,621		

1981 Danish general election

Parties	Vote		
Parties	Votes	%	+ / -
Social Democrats	8,751	31.09	-8.15
Conservatives	7,272	25.84	+4.87
Green Left	4,028	14.31	+7.07
Progress Party	1,833	6.51	-1.09
Centre Democrats	1,525	5.42	+3.04
Left Socialists	1,415	5.03	-1.03
Social Liberals	1,193	4.24	+0.20
Venstre	676	2.40	-2.04
Communist Party of Denmark	523	1.86	-0.88
Justice Party of Denmark	419	1.49	-1.61
Christian People's Party	419	1.49	-0.09
Communist Workers Party	62	0.22	-0.38
Socialist Workers Party	27	0.10	New
Total	28,143		

=== General elections in the 1970s ===
1979 Danish general election

Parties	Vote		
Parties	Votes	%	+ / -
Social Democrats	11,360	39.24	-1.03
Conservatives	6,070	20.97	+4.36
Progress Party	2,200	7.60	-2.81
Green Left	2,095	7.24	+2.21
Left Socialists	1,753	6.06	+2.05
Venstre	1,284	4.44	+0.82
Social Liberals	1,170	4.04	+1.07
Justice Party of Denmark	897	3.10	-0.63
Communist Party of Denmark	793	2.74	-2.41
Centre Democrats	688	2.38	-2.35
Christian People's Party	458	1.58	-0.56
Communist Workers Party	175	0.60	New
Thorkild Weiss Madsen	6	0.02	New
Total	28,949		

1977 Danish general election

Parties	Vote		
Parties	Votes	%	+ / -
Social Democrats	12,177	40.27	+8.73
Conservatives	5,023	16.61	+4.13
Progress Party	3,148	10.41	-0.48
Communist Party of Denmark	1,557	5.15	-0.97
Green Left	1,521	5.03	-2.07
Centre Democrats	1,431	4.73	+3.30
Left Socialists	1,213	4.01	+0.83
Justice Party of Denmark	1,127	3.73	+2.10
Venstre	1,095	3.62	-11.71
Social Liberals	897	2.97	-3.57
Christian People's Party	648	2.14	-1.59
Pensioners' Party	388	1.28	New
Niels Kjær-Larsen	12	0.04	New
Total	30,237		

1975 Danish general election

Parties	Vote		
Parties	Votes	%	+ / -
Social Democrats	9,769	31.54	+3.11
Venstre	4,748	15.33	+10.93
Conservatives	3,865	12.48	-5.18
Progress Party	3,373	10.89	-1.38
Green Left	2,199	7.10	-1.81
Social Liberals	2,027	6.54	-2.90
Communist Party of Denmark	1,895	6.12	+0.34
Christian People's Party	1,155	3.73	+1.03
Left Socialists	985	3.18	+1.23
Justice Party of Denmark	504	1.63	-1.23
Centre Democrats	443	1.43	-4.16
Otto Holtermann	13	0.04	New
Total	30,976		

1973 Danish general election

Parties	Vote		
Parties	Votes	%	+ / -
Social Democrats	9,008	28.43	-5.88
Conservatives	5,597	17.66	-12.90
Progress Party	3,887	12.27	New
Social Liberals	2,992	9.44	-1.59
Green Left	2,823	8.91	-4.19
Communist Party of Denmark	1,831	5.78	+3.97
Centre Democrats	1,770	5.59	New
Venstre	1,393	4.40	+0.28
Justice Party of Denmark	907	2.86	+1.50
Christian People's Party	856	2.70	+1.54
Left Socialists	618	1.95	-0.60
Bent Jespersen	4	0.01	New
Anne Vedelstierne	3	0.01	New
Total	31,689		

1971 Danish general election

Parties	Vote		
Parties	Votes	%	+ / -
Social Democrats	10,921	34.31	+1.80
Conservatives	9,728	30.56	-5.37
Green Left	4,171	13.10	+5.70
Social Liberals	3,511	11.03	-1.88
Venstre	1,310	4.12	+0.36
Left Socialists	811	2.55	-1.00
Communist Party of Denmark	577	1.81	+0.18
Justice Party of Denmark	433	1.36	+0.96
Christian People's Party	369	1.16	New
Total	31,831		

=== General elections in the 1960s ===
1968 Danish general election

Parties	Vote		
Parties	Votes	%	+ / -
Conservatives	12,130	35.93	+2.70
Social Democrats	10,974	32.51	-1.77
Social Liberals	4,357	12.91	+7.51
Green Left	2,498	7.40	-8.81
Venstre	1,269	3.76	-1.19
Left Socialists	1,198	3.55	New
Communist Party of Denmark	550	1.63	+0.43
Liberal Centre	546	1.62	-1.74
Justice Party of Denmark	136	0.40	+0.05
Independent Party	94	0.28	-0.74
Alf Bruhn	4	0.01	New
Total	33,756		

1966 Danish general election

Parties	Vote		
Parties	Votes	%	+ / -
Social Democrats	11,716	34.28	-7.53
Conservatives	11,357	33.23	-3.27
Green Left	5,541	16.21	+8.44
Social Liberals	1,847	5.40	+2.38
Venstre	1,690	4.95	-1.42
Liberal Centre	1,147	3.36	New
Communist Party of Denmark	409	1.20	-0.51
Independent Party	348	1.02	-0.56
Justice Party of Denmark	120	0.35	-0.20
Total	34,175		

1964 Danish general election

Parties	Vote		
Parties	Votes	%	+ / -
Social Democrats	14,157	41.81	+0.33
Conservatives	12,359	36.50	-0.03
Green Left	2,632	7.77	-0.37
Venstre	2,156	6.37	+1.61
Social Liberals	1,024	3.02	-0.76
Communist Party of Denmark	578	1.71	+0.13
Independent Party	534	1.58	-1.09
Justice Party of Denmark	186	0.55	-0.52
Danish Unity	115	0.34	New
Peace Politics People's Party	109	0.32	New
Total	33,862		

1960 Danish general election

Parties	Vote		
Parties	Votes	%	+ / -
Social Democrats	13,649	41.48	+2.49
Conservatives	12,020	36.53	-1.16
Green Left	2,678	8.14	New
Venstre	1,568	4.76	-2.42
Social Liberals	1,243	3.78	-2.38
Independent Party	878	2.67	+1.15
Communist Party of Denmark	520	1.58	-2.70
Justice Party of Denmark	351	1.07	-3.10
Total	32,907		

=== General elections in the 1950s ===
1957 Danish general election

Parties	Vote		
Parties	Votes	%	+ / -
Social Democrats	12,785	38.99	-0.99
Conservatives	12,360	37.69	-0.59
Venstre	2,356	7.18	+1.92
Social Liberals	2,021	6.16	+0.42
Communist Party of Denmark	1,405	4.28	-1.75
Justice Party of Denmark	1,366	4.17	+1.74
Independent Party	498	1.52	-0.77
Total	32,791		

September 1953 Danish Folketing election

Parties	Vote		
Parties	Votes	%	+ / -
Social Democrats	12,483	39.98	-0.17
Conservatives	11,953	38.28	+1.52
Communist Party of Denmark	1,882	6.03	-0.46
Social Liberals	1,792	5.74	-0.64
Venstre	1,642	5.26	+0.81
Justice Party of Denmark	758	2.43	-2.19
Independent Party	714	2.29	New
Total	31,224		

April 1953 Danish Folketing election

Parties	Vote		
Parties	Votes	%	+ / -
Social Democrats	12,258	40.15	+1.07
Conservatives	11,225	36.76	-1.29
Communist Party of Denmark	1,981	6.49	-0.09
Social Liberals	1,949	6.38	+0.32
Justice Party of Denmark	1,410	4.62	-3.13
Venstre	1,360	4.45	+1.98
Danish Unity	351	1.15	New
Total	30,534		

1950 Danish Folketing election

Parties	Vote		
Parties	Votes	%	+ / -
Social Democrats	11,797	39.08	-1.09
Conservatives	11,488	38.05	+13.68
Justice Party of Denmark	2,340	7.75	+2.26
Communist Party of Denmark	1,988	6.58	-3.05
Social Liberals	1,830	6.06	-0.16
Venstre	747	2.47	-9.89
Total	30,190		

=== General elections in the 1940s ===
1947 Danish Folketing election

Parties	Vote		
Parties	Votes	%	+ / -
Social Democrats	12,781	40.17	+10.07
Conservatives	7,754	24.37	-10.98
Capital Venstre	3,933	12.36	+7.53
Communist Party of Denmark	3,065	9.63	-7.91
Social Liberals	1,978	6.22	+0.72
Justice Party of Denmark	1,748	5.49	+4.21
Danish Unity	555	1.74	-3.66
Total	31,814		

1945 Danish Folketing election

Parties	Vote		
Parties	Votes	%	+ / -
Conservatives	11,282	35.35	-3.30
Social Democrats	9,607	30.10	-15.86
Communist Party of Denmark	5,598	17.54	New
Social Liberals	1,757	5.50	-0.62
Danish Unity	1,723	5.40	+1.16
Venstre	1,543	4.83	+3.66
Justice Party of Denmark	407	1.28	+0.04
Total	31,917		

1943 Danish Folketing election

Parties	Vote		
Parties	Votes	%	+ / -
Social Democrats	14,267	45.96	-2.41
Conservatives	11,999	38.65	+5.16
Social Liberals	1,899	6.12	-2.80
Danish Unity	1,316	4.24	+3.61
National Socialist Workers' Party of Denmark	815	2.63	+0.86
Justice Party of Denmark	385	1.24	-0.03
Venstre	363	1.17	-0.16
Total	31,044		

=== General elections in the 1930s ===
1939 Danish Folketing election

Parties	Vote		
Parties	Votes	%	+ / -
Social Democrats	12,733	48.37	-6.91
Conservatives	8,815	33.49	+2.93
Social Liberals	2,349	8.92	+0.61
Communist Party of Denmark	687	2.61	+0.34
National Socialist Workers' Party of Denmark	466	1.77	+1.17
National Cooperation	422	1.60	New
Venstre	349	1.33	+0.69
Justice Party of Denmark	334	1.27	-1.07
Danish Unity	167	0.63	New
Total	26,322		

1935 Danish Folketing election

Parties	Vote		
Parties	Votes	%	+ / -
Social Democrats	14,388	55.28	-1.01
Conservatives	7,953	30.56	-1.00
Social Liberals	2,163	8.31	+1.80
Justice Party of Denmark	610	2.34	-0.18
Communist Party of Denmark	592	2.27	+0.57
Venstre	166	0.64	-0.78
National Socialist Workers' Party of Denmark	155	0.60	New
Total	26,027		

1932 Danish Folketing election

Parties	Vote		
Parties	Votes	%	+ / -
Social Democrats	12,458	56.29	-2.28
Conservatives	6,984	31.56	+2.06
Social Liberals	1,440	6.51	-0.18
Justice Party of Denmark	557	2.52	+0.34
Communist Party of Denmark	376	1.70	+1.48
Venstre	314	1.42	-1.41
Curt C. Hansen	3	0.01	New
Total	22,132		

=== General elections in the 1920s ===
1929 Danish Folketing election

Parties	Vote		
Parties	Votes	%	+ / -
Social Democrats	11,374	58.57	+4.23
Conservatives	5,729	29.50	-3.30
Social Liberals	1,299	6.69	-1.51
Venstre	550	2.83	+0.58
Justice Party of Denmark	423	2.18	+0.68
Communist Party of Denmark	43	0.22	-0.69
Total	19,418		

1926 Danish Folketing election

Parties	Vote		
Parties	Votes	%	+ / -
Social Democrats	9,957	54.34	-1.19
Conservatives	6,009	32.80	+2.90
Social Liberals	1,502	8.20	-1.18
Venstre	413	2.25	-0.40
Justice Party of Denmark	275	1.50	+0.48
Communist Party of Denmark	166	0.91	-0.18
Total	18,322		

1924 Danish Folketing election

Parties	Vote		
Parties	Votes	%	+ / -
Social Democrats	9,761	55.53	+0.26
Conservatives	5,255	29.90	+3.87
Social Liberals	1,649	9.38	+1.90
Venstre	465	2.65	-2.15
Communist Party of Denmark	191	1.09	New
Justice Party of Denmark	180	1.02	New
Industry Party	77	0.44	-3.34
Total	17,578		

September 1920 Danish Folketing election

Parties	Vote		
Parties	Votes	%	+ / -
Social Democrats	8,994	55.27	+0.61
Conservatives	4,236	26.03	-1.95
Social Liberals	1,217	7.48	+1.34
Venstre	781	4.80	-0.70
Industry Party	615	3.78	-1.34
Free Social Democrats	309	1.90	New
Danish Left Socialist Party	122	0.75	New
Total	16,274		

July 1920 Danish Folketing election

Parties	Vote		
Parties	Votes	%	+ / -
Social Democrats	6,784	54.66	+4.27
Conservatives	3,472	27.98	+0.04
Social Liberals	762	6.14	-0.74
Venstre	683	5.50	+0.69
Industry Party	635	5.12	-0.99
Henrik Jarlbæk	63	0.51	-0.38
J. L. Knudsen	6	0.05	New
Jensine M. Nielsen-Barbro	6	0.05	New
Th. S. Damsgaard Schmidt	0	0.00	New
Total	12,411		

April 1920 Danish Folketing election

Parties	Vote	
Parties	Votes	%
Social Democrats	7,329	50.39
Conservatives	4,063	27.94
Social Liberals	1,000	6.88
Industry Party	888	6.11
Venstre	700	4.81
Centrum	233	1.60
Free Social Democrats	201	1.38
Henrik Jarlbæk	130	0.89
Total	14,544	

== European Parliament elections results ==
2024 European Parliament election in Denmark

Parties	Vote		
Parties	Votes	%	+ / -
Green Left	5,323	22.22	+3.58
Red–Green Alliance	3,007	12.55	+4.53
Social Democrats	2,856	11.92	-3.56
Social Liberals	2,713	11.32	-5.21
Conservatives	2,580	10.77	+0.58
Venstre	2,385	9.96	-4.77
Liberal Alliance	1,640	6.85	+4.40
Moderates	1,326	5.53	New
The Alternative	940	3.92	-1.28
Danish People's Party	866	3.61	-2.09
Denmark Democrats	321	1.34	New
Total	23,957		

2019 European Parliament election in Denmark

Parties	Vote		
Parties	Votes	%	+ / -
Green Left	8,530	22.95	+3.28
Social Democrats	6,704	18.03	-2.70
Social Liberals	5,464	14.70	+4.65
Red–Green Alliance	4,026	10.83	New
Venstre	3,826	10.29	+2.00
Danish People's Party	2,494	6.71	-12.69
The Alternative	2,036	5.48	New
Conservatives	1,926	5.18	-0.67
People's Movement against the EU	1,605	4.32	-8.99
Liberal Alliance	562	1.51	-1.19
Total	37,173		

2014 European Parliament election in Denmark

Parties	Vote		
Parties	Votes	%	+ / -
Social Democrats	6,282	20.73	-0.35
Green Left	5,960	19.67	-3.57
Danish People's Party	5,877	19.40	+5.60
People's Movement against the EU	4,033	13.31	+0.27
Social Liberals	3,046	10.05	+3.32
Venstre	2,512	8.29	-1.90
Conservatives	1,771	5.85	-1.72
Liberal Alliance	817	2.70	+2.00
Total	30,298		

2009 European Parliament election in Denmark

Parties	Vote		
Parties	Votes	%	+ / -
Green Left	7,201	23.24	+9.52
Social Democrats	6,533	21.08	-9.88
Danish People's Party	4,276	13.80	+7.46
People's Movement against the EU	4,042	13.04	+3.97
Venstre	3,157	10.19	+0.91
Conservatives	2,345	7.57	-1.40
Social Liberals	2,086	6.73	-3.09
June Movement	1,134	3.66	-7.36
Liberal Alliance	217	0.70	New
Total	30,991		

2004 European Parliament election in Denmark

Parties	Vote		
Parties	Votes	%	+ / -
Social Democrats	5,177	30.96	+16.27
Green Left	2,294	13.72	+2.25
June Movement	1,842	11.02	-9.10
Social Liberals	1,642	9.82	-0.94
Venstre	1,551	9.28	-3.68
People's Movement against the EU	1,516	9.07	-1.79
Conservatives	1,500	8.97	+2.06
Danish People's Party	1,060	6.34	-1.07
Christian Democrats	137	0.82	-0.42
Total	16,719		

1999 European Parliament election in Denmark

Parties	Vote		
Parties	Votes	%	+ / -
June Movement	3,513	20.12	-0.90
Social Democrats	2,565	14.69	+0.47
Venstre	2,262	12.96	+3.39
Green Left	2,003	11.47	-0.56
People's Movement against the EU	1,895	10.86	-4.11
Social Liberals	1,879	10.76	+1.93
Danish People's Party	1,293	7.41	New
Conservatives	1,206	6.91	-8.05
Centre Democrats	624	3.57	+2.50
Christian Democrats	217	1.24	+0.51
Progress Party	88	0.50	-2.10
Total	17,457		

1994 European Parliament election in Denmark

Parties	Vote		
Parties	Votes	%	+ / -
June Movement	3,861	21.02	New
People's Movement against the EU	2,751	14.97	-14.97
Conservatives	2,748	14.96	+3.45
Social Democrats	2,612	14.22	-7.34
Green Left	2,211	12.03	-2.44
Venstre	1,759	9.57	+2.70
Social Liberals	1,622	8.83	+5.98
Progress Party	478	2.60	-1.50
Centre Democrats	196	1.07	-6.01
Christian Democrats	134	0.73	-0.90
Total	18,372		

1989 European Parliament election in Denmark

Parties	Vote		
Parties	Votes	%	+ / -
People's Movement against the EU	5,187	29.94	+0.41
Social Democrats	3,735	21.56	+1.66
Green Left	2,506	14.47	+0.43
Conservatives	1,994	11.51	-6.94
Centre Democrats	1,226	7.08	+1.63
Venstre	1,190	6.87	+4.17
Progress Party	711	4.10	+0.64
Social Liberals	493	2.85	+0.56
Christian Democrats	282	1.63	-0.14
Total	17,324		

1984 European Parliament election in Denmark

Parties	Vote	
Parties	Votes	%
People's Movement against the EU	5,797	29.53
Social Democrats	3,907	19.90
Conservatives	3,622	18.45
Green Left	2,756	14.04
Centre Democrats	1,071	5.45
Progress Party	680	3.46
Venstre	531	2.70
Left Socialists	474	2.41
Social Liberals	449	2.29
Christian Democrats	347	1.77
Total	19,634	

== Referendums ==
2022 Danish European Union opt-out referendum

Option	Votes	%
✓ YES	17,313	72.15
X NO	6,684	27.85

2015 Danish European Union opt-out referendum

Option	Votes	%
✓ YES	14,327	55.20
X NO	11,628	44.80

2014 Danish Unified Patent Court membership referendum

Option	Votes	%
✓ YES	13,748	64.83
X NO	7,459	35.17

2009 Danish Act of Succession referendum

Option	Votes	%
✓ YES	15,418	84.73
X NO	2,779	15.27

2000 Danish euro referendum

Option	Votes	%
✓ YES	15,661	51.98
X NO	14,468	48.02

1998 Danish Amsterdam Treaty referendum

Option	Votes	%
✓ YES	15,106	57.23
X NO	11,290	42.77

1993 Danish Maastricht Treaty referendum

Option	Votes	%
✓ YES	16,018	53.80
X NO	13,754	46.20

1992 Danish Maastricht Treaty referendum

Option	Votes	%
X NO	14,660	51.36
✓ YES	13,886	48.64

1986 Danish Single European Act referendum

Option	Votes	%
X NO	13,111	50.73
✓ YES	12,734	49.27

1972 Danish European Communities membership referendum

Option	Votes	%
✓ YES	19,017	56.67
X NO	14,538	43.33

1953 Danish constitutional and electoral age referendum

Option	Votes	%
✓ YES	16,202	71.21
X NO	6,551	28.79
23 years	12,866	55.65
21 years	10,253	44.35

1939 Danish constitutional referendum

Option	Votes	%
✓ YES	19,602	92.74
X NO	1,534	7.26
