= Falkoner (nomination district) =

Danish nomination district

- Falkoner
- Nomination district constituency for the Folketing
- Location of Falkoner within Copenhagen

- Location of Copenhagen within Denmark
- Municipalities: Frederiksberg
- Constituency: Copenhagen
- Electorate: 37,944 (2022)

Current constituency
- Created: 1915

Falkoner nominating district is one of the 92 nominating districts that exists for Danish elections following the 2007 municipal reform. It is one of the 2 nominating districts in Frederiksberg Municipality, the other being Slots. It was created in 1915, though its boundaries have been changed since then.

In general elections, the district is a strong area for parties commonly associated with the red bloc.

== General elections results ==
=== General elections in the 2020s ===
2022 Danish general election

Parties	Vote		
Parties	Votes	%	+ / -
Social Democrats	5,717	17.02	+2.58
Moderates	3,730	11.11	New
Red–Green Alliance	3,624	10.79	-1.66
Green Left	3,611	10.75	-0.27
Venstre	3,501	10.43	-7.69
Liberal Alliance	3,162	9.42	+6.62
Social Liberals	2,950	8.78	-10.67
The Alternative	2,927	8.72	+3.19
Conservatives	2,735	8.14	-1.27
Denmark Democrats	432	1.29	New
New Right	390	1.16	-0.14
Danish People's Party	360	1.07	-2.09
Independent Greens	349	1.04	New
Christian Democrats	59	0.18	-0.49
Flemming Blicher	25	0.07	New
Tom Gillesberg	9	0.03	+0.01
Total	33,581		

=== General elections in the 2010s ===
2019 Danish general election

Parties	Vote		
Parties	Votes	%	+ / -
Social Liberals	6,496	19.45	+7.03
Venstre	6,053	18.12	+5.73
Social Democrats	4,824	14.44	-6.97
Red–Green Alliance	4,159	12.45	+0.49
Green Left	3,681	11.02	+4.97
Conservatives	3,144	9.41	+3.50
The Alternative	1,846	5.53	-4.97
Danish People's Party	1,055	3.16	-5.00
Liberal Alliance	935	2.80	-7.96
New Right	435	1.30	New
Klaus Riskær Pedersen Party	273	0.82	New
Stram Kurs	249	0.75	New
Christian Democrats	225	0.67	+0.41
Pierre Tavares	11	0.03	New
Tom Gillesberg	8	0.02	-0.01
John Jørgensen	2	0.01	New
Tommy Schou Christesen	2	0.01	New
John Erik Wagner	1	0.00	-0.01
Total	33,399		

2015 Danish general election

Parties	Vote		
Parties	Votes	%	+ / -
Social Democrats	7,134	21.41	+5.80
Social Liberals	4,140	12.42	-7.98
Venstre	4,129	12.39	-5.30
Red–Green Alliance	3,985	11.96	-0.47
Liberal Alliance	3,584	10.76	+3.56
The Alternative	3,500	10.50	New
Danish People's Party	2,720	8.16	+2.09
Green Left	2,015	6.05	-4.35
Conservatives	1,970	5.91	-4.02
Christian Democrats	85	0.26	+0.02
Kashif Ahmad	48	0.14	New
Tom Gillesberg	11	0.03	+0.01
John Erik Wagner	3	0.01	0.00
Jan Elkjær	0	0.00	New
Total	33,324		

2011 Danish general election

Parties	Vote		
Parties	Votes	%	+ / -
Social Liberals	6,792	20.40	+9.48
Venstre	5,889	17.69	+2.13
Social Democrats	5,198	15.61	-4.87
Red–Green Alliance	4,139	12.43	+7.21
Green Left	3,462	10.40	-6.80
Conservatives	3,308	9.93	-7.02
Liberal Alliance	2,397	7.20	+1.75
Danish People's Party	2,022	6.07	-1.70
Christian Democrats	80	0.24	-0.17
Tom Gillesberg	5	0.02	0.00
Klaus Trier Tuxen	3	0.01	New
Mads Vestergaard	2	0.01	New
John Erik Wagner	2	0.01	0.00
Per Zimmermann	0	0.00	New
Morten Versner	0	0.00	New
Total	33,299		

=== General elections in the 2000s ===
2007 Danish general election

Parties	Vote		
Parties	Votes	%	+ / -
Social Democrats	6,471	20.48	+1.32
Green Left	5,435	17.20	+9.39
Conservatives	5,357	16.95	-0.11
Venstre	4,918	15.56	-4.04
Social Liberals	3,452	10.92	-8.58
Danish People's Party	2,454	7.77	-0.58
New Alliance	1,722	5.45	New
Red–Green Alliance	1,649	5.22	-0.88
Christian Democrats	130	0.41	-0.59
Tom Gillesberg	7	0.02	New
John Erik Wagner	4	0.01	New
Amir Becirovic	1	0.00	New
Vibeke Baden Laursen	1	0.00	New
Nicolai Krogh Mittet	1	0.00	New
Total	31,602		

2005 Danish general election

Parties	Vote		
Parties	Votes	%	+ / -
Venstre	3,442	19.60	-3.66
Social Liberals	3,425	19.50	+8.57
Social Democrats	3,366	19.16	-4.08
Conservatives	2,996	17.06	+1.17
Danish People's Party	1,467	8.35	+0.24
Green Left	1,371	7.81	-1.00
Red–Green Alliance	1,072	6.10	+1.25
Centre Democrats	185	1.05	-1.91
Christian Democrats	175	1.00	-0.64
Minority Party	66	0.38	New
Total	17,565		

2001 Danish general election

Parties	Vote		
Parties	Votes	%	+ / -
Venstre	4,192	23.26	+4.07
Social Democrats	4,188	23.24	-3.95
Conservatives	2,864	15.89	+0.47
Social Liberals	1,969	10.93	+2.25
Green Left	1,588	8.81	-1.42
Danish People's Party	1,462	8.11	+1.87
Red–Green Alliance	874	4.85	-0.55
Centre Democrats	534	2.96	-1.74
Christian People's Party	295	1.64	-0.01
Progress Party	53	0.29	-0.74
Total	18,019		

=== General elections in the 1990s ===
1998 Danish general election

Parties	Vote		
Parties	Votes	%	+ / -
Social Democrats	4,832	27.19	+2.98
Venstre	3,410	19.19	+3.36
Conservatives	2,740	15.42	-10.50
Green Left	1,818	10.23	-0.13
Social Liberals	1,542	8.68	+0.62
Danish People's Party	1,108	6.24	New
Red–Green Alliance	960	5.40	-0.88
Centre Democrats	836	4.70	+1.53
Christian People's Party	294	1.65	+0.54
Progress Party	183	1.03	-3.86
Democratic Renewal	46	0.26	New
Total	17,769		

1994 Danish general election

Parties	Vote		
Parties	Votes	%	+ / -
Conservatives	4,560	25.92	+0.98
Social Democrats	4,259	24.21	-6.70
Venstre	2,784	15.83	+5.27
Green Left	1,822	10.36	-1.43
Social Liberals	1,418	8.06	+3.03
Red–Green Alliance	1,105	6.28	+2.67
Progress Party	860	4.89	+1.51
Centre Democrats	558	3.17	-1.23
Christian People's Party	195	1.11	-0.11
Ebba Bigler	30	0.17	New
Total	17,591		

1990 Danish general election

Parties	Vote		
Parties	Votes	%	+ / -
Social Democrats	5,111	30.91	+8.94
Conservatives	4,123	24.94	-3.94
Green Left	1,950	11.79	-6.46
Venstre	1,746	10.56	+4.92
Social Liberals	832	5.03	-2.69
Centre Democrats	728	4.40	+0.90
Red–Green Alliance	597	3.61	New
Progress Party	559	3.38	-2.78
Common Course	351	2.12	+0.55
The Greens	223	1.35	-0.98
Christian People's Party	201	1.22	+0.04
Justice Party of Denmark	106	0.64	New
Humanist Party	6	0.04	New
Total	16,533		

=== General elections in the 1980s ===
1988 Danish general election

Parties	Vote		
Parties	Votes	%	+ / -
Conservatives	5,046	28.88	-0.86
Social Democrats	3,839	21.97	+0.90
Green Left	3,190	18.25	-1.30
Social Liberals	1,349	7.72	-0.19
Progress Party	1,077	6.16	+2.45
Venstre	986	5.64	+1.95
Centre Democrats	612	3.50	-0.41
The Greens	407	2.33	+0.73
Common Course	275	1.57	-0.47
Communist Party of Denmark	247	1.41	-0.01
Left Socialists	241	1.38	-1.77
Christian People's Party	206	1.18	-0.24
Total	17,475		

1987 Danish general election

Parties	Vote		
Parties	Votes	%	+ / -
Conservatives	5,237	29.74	-2.15
Social Democrats	3,711	21.07	-4.38
Green Left	3,444	19.55	+4.40
Social Liberals	1,393	7.91	+1.85
Centre Democrats	688	3.91	+0.42
Progress Party	653	3.71	+1.31
Venstre	650	3.69	-1.17
Left Socialists	555	3.15	-2.90
Common Course	360	2.04	New
The Greens	281	1.60	New
Communist Party of Denmark	250	1.42	+0.22
Christian People's Party	250	1.42	-0.05
Justice Party of Denmark	73	0.41	-1.48
Humanist Party	48	0.27	New
Socialist Workers Party	15	0.09	+0.04
Marxist–Leninists Party	4	0.02	-0.02
Total	17,612		

1984 Danish general election

Parties	Vote		
Parties	Votes	%	+ / -
Conservatives	5,862	31.89	+5.94
Social Democrats	4,678	25.45	-1.62
Green Left	2,784	15.15	-0.19
Social Liberals	1,114	6.06	+1.29
Left Socialists	1,112	6.05	+0.61
Venstre	893	4.86	+1.62
Centre Democrats	641	3.49	-2.73
Progress Party	442	2.40	-4.32
Justice Party of Denmark	347	1.89	-0.23
Christian People's Party	271	1.47	+0.37
Communist Party of Denmark	220	1.20	-0.55
Socialist Workers Party	9	0.05	-0.06
Marxist–Leninists Party	7	0.04	New
Total	18,380		

1981 Danish general election

Parties	Vote		
Parties	Votes	%	+ / -
Social Democrats	4,681	27.07	-0.03
Conservatives	4,487	25.95	+8.65
Green Left	2,652	15.34	+9.67
Progress Party	1,162	6.72	+0.49
Centre Democrats	1,075	6.22	+4.13
Left Socialists	940	5.44	+0.18
Social Liberals	825	4.77	-21.47
Venstre	560	3.24	-0.80
Justice Party of Denmark	367	2.12	-0.51
Communist Party of Denmark	302	1.75	-0.26
Christian People's Party	191	1.10	+0.16
Communist Workers Party	32	0.19	-0.26
Socialist Workers Party	19	0.11	New
Total	17,293		

=== General elections in the 1970s ===
1979 Danish general election

Parties	Vote		
Parties	Votes	%	+ / -
Social Democrats	6,285	27.10	-8.83
Social Liberals	6,085	26.24	+22.97
Conservatives	4,012	17.30	+0.72
Progress Party	1,445	6.23	-5.67
Green Left	1,315	5.67	-0.27
Left Socialists	1,219	5.26	+0.69
Venstre	937	4.04	-0.51
Justice Party of Denmark	611	2.63	-1.65
Centre Democrats	485	2.09	-3.56
Communist Party of Denmark	465	2.01	-2.33
Christian People's Party	218	0.94	-0.85
Communist Workers Party	104	0.45	New
Thorkild Weiss Madsen	11	0.05	New
Total	23,192		

1977 Danish general election

Parties	Vote		
Parties	Votes	%	+ / -
Social Democrats	6,740	35.93	+10.24
Conservatives	3,111	16.58	+3.56
Progress Party	2,233	11.90	-0.01
Green Left	1,115	5.94	-1.19
Centre Democrats	1,060	5.65	+3.96
Left Socialists	858	4.57	+0.91
Venstre	854	4.55	-14.19
Communist Party of Denmark	815	4.34	-0.73
Justice Party of Denmark	802	4.28	+2.40
Social Liberals	614	3.27	-4.22
Christian People's Party	335	1.79	-1.90
Pensioners' Party	210	1.12	New
Niels Kjær-Larsen	12	0.06	New
Total	18,759		

1975 Danish general election

Parties	Vote		
Parties	Votes	%	+ / -
Social Democrats	4,929	25.69	+2.96
Venstre	3,596	18.74	+12.36
Conservatives	2,498	13.02	-6.44
Progress Party	2,286	11.91	-1.93
Social Liberals	1,437	7.49	-2.86
Green Left	1,369	7.13	-1.10
Communist Party of Denmark	972	5.07	+0.10
Christian People's Party	709	3.69	+1.21
Left Socialists	702	3.66	+1.33
Justice Party of Denmark	361	1.88	-1.29
Centre Democrats	324	1.69	-4.36
Otto Holtermann	7	0.04	New
Total	19,190		

1973 Danish general election

Parties	Vote		
Parties	Votes	%	+ / -
Social Democrats	4,406	22.73	-5.03
Conservatives	3,771	19.46	-15.60
Progress Party	2,682	13.84	New
Social Liberals	2,007	10.35	-2.96
Green Left	1,596	8.23	-3.32
Venstre	1,237	6.38	+1.31
Centre Democrats	1,172	6.05	New
Communist Party of Denmark	963	4.97	+3.35
Justice Party of Denmark	614	3.17	+1.56
Christian People's Party	481	2.48	+1.57
Left Socialists	451	2.33	-0.78
Bent Jespersen	2	0.01	New
Anne Vedelstierne	1	0.01	New
Total	19,383		

1971 Danish general election

Parties	Vote		
Parties	Votes	%	+ / -
Conservatives	6,792	35.06	-7.63
Social Democrats	5,378	27.76	+2.64
Social Liberals	2,578	13.31	-1.04
Green Left	2,237	11.55	+5.16
Venstre	983	5.07	+0.68
Left Socialists	603	3.11	-0.13
Communist Party of Denmark	313	1.62	+0.43
Justice Party of Denmark	311	1.61	+1.16
Christian People's Party	176	0.91	New
Total	19,371		

=== General elections in the 1960s ===
1968 Danish general election

Parties	Vote		
Parties	Votes	%	+ / -
Conservatives	8,825	42.69	+3.74
Social Democrats	5,193	25.12	-2.94
Social Liberals	2,966	14.35	+7.92
Green Left	1,321	6.39	-7.52
Venstre	908	4.39	-1.21
Left Socialists	669	3.24	New
Liberal Centre	385	1.86	-2.26
Communist Party of Denmark	246	1.19	+0.31
Justice Party of Denmark	93	0.45	-0.03
Independent Party	57	0.28	-1.29
Alf Bruhn	8	0.04	New
Total	20,671		

1966 Danish general election

Parties	Vote		
Parties	Votes	%	+ / -
Conservatives	8,097	38.95	-3.60
Social Democrats	5,833	28.06	-5.27
Green Left	2,892	13.91	+7.08
Social Liberals	1,336	6.43	+2.47
Venstre	1,164	5.60	-2.63
Liberal Centre	856	4.12	New
Independent Party	327	1.57	-0.76
Communist Party of Denmark	182	0.88	-0.40
Justice Party of Denmark	100	0.48	-0.17
Total	20,787		

1964 Danish general election

Parties	Vote		
Parties	Votes	%	+ / -
Conservatives	8,733	42.55	-1.13
Social Democrats	6,842	33.33	+0.44
Venstre	1,690	8.23	+2.44
Green Left	1,402	6.83	-0.38
Social Liberals	813	3.96	-0.53
Independent Party	478	2.33	-1.22
Communist Party of Denmark	263	1.28	+0.13
Justice Party of Denmark	133	0.65	-0.60
Peace Politics People's Party	86	0.42	New
Danish Unity	77	0.38	New
Total	20,525		

1960 Danish general election

Parties	Vote		
Parties	Votes	%	+ / -
Conservatives	8,841	43.68	+0.26
Social Democrats	6,656	32.89	+1.16
Green Left	1,459	7.21	New
Venstre	1,172	5.79	-3.28
Social Liberals	909	4.49	-2.13
Independent Party	719	3.55	+1.50
Justice Party of Denmark	252	1.25	-3.04
Communist Party of Denmark	232	1.15	-1.67
Total	20,240		

=== General elections in the 1950s ===
1957 Danish general election

Parties	Vote		
Parties	Votes	%	+ / -
Conservatives	8,849	43.42	-1.82
Social Democrats	6,467	31.73	+0.41
Venstre	1,848	9.07	+1.87
Social Liberals	1,349	6.62	+0.09
Justice Party of Denmark	875	4.29	+1.60
Communist Party of Denmark	574	2.82	-1.07
Independent Party	417	2.05	-1.09
Total	20,379		

September 1953 Danish Folketing election

Parties	Vote		
Parties	Votes	%	+ / -
Conservatives	8,905	45.24	+1.30
Social Democrats	6,165	31.32	-0.36
Venstre	1,418	7.20	+0.67
Social Liberals	1,285	6.53	-1.31
Communist Party of Denmark	766	3.89	-0.48
Independent Party	618	3.14	New
Justice Party of Denmark	529	2.69	-1.92
Total	19,686		

April 1953 Danish Folketing election

Parties	Vote		
Parties	Votes	%	+ / -
Conservatives	8,417	43.94	-1.45
Social Democrats	6,069	31.68	+0.65
Social Liberals	1,502	7.84	+0.46
Venstre	1,250	6.53	+2.79
Justice Party of Denmark	883	4.61	-3.43
Communist Party of Denmark	837	4.37	-0.05
Danish Unity	198	1.03	New
Total	19,156		

1950 Danish Folketing election

Parties	Vote		
Parties	Votes	%	+ / -
Conservatives	8,800	45.39	+15.11
Social Democrats	6,017	31.03	-0.88
Justice Party of Denmark	1,559	8.04	+2.32
Social Liberals	1,431	7.38	-0.38
Communist Party of Denmark	857	4.42	-2.55
Venstre	725	3.74	-11.91
Total	19,389		

=== General elections in the 1940s ===
1947 Danish Folketing election

Parties	Vote		
Parties	Votes	%	+ / -
Social Democrats	6,646	31.91	+7.99
Conservatives	6,306	30.28	-12.59
Capital Venstre	3,259	15.65	+8.75
Social Liberals	1,617	7.76	+0.36
Communist Party of Denmark	1,451	6.97	-5.74
Justice Party of Denmark	1,191	5.72	+4.35
Danish Unity	357	1.71	-3.13
Total	20,827		

1945 Danish Folketing election

Parties	Vote		
Parties	Votes	%	+ / -
Conservatives	9,170	42.87	-3.84
Social Democrats	5,116	23.92	-12.19
Communist Party of Denmark	2,718	12.71	New
Social Liberals	1,583	7.40	+0.17
Venstre	1,476	6.90	+5.38
Danish Unity	1,036	4.84	+0.65
Justice Party of Denmark	292	1.37	+0.14
Total	21,391		

1943 Danish Folketing election

Parties	Vote		
Parties	Votes	%	+ / -
Conservatives	10,131	46.71	+3.96
Social Democrats	7,832	36.11	-0.91
Social Liberals	1,568	7.23	-2.92
Danish Unity	908	4.19	+3.53
National Socialist Workers' Party of Denmark	652	3.01	+0.93
Venstre	330	1.52	-0.17
Justice Party of Denmark	266	1.23	-0.26
Total	21,687		

=== General elections in the 1930s ===
1939 Danish Folketing election

Parties	Vote		
Parties	Votes	%	+ / -
Conservatives	7,780	42.75	+2.45
Social Democrats	6,737	37.02	-6.20
Social Liberals	1,847	10.15	-0.54
National Cooperation	407	2.24	New
National Socialist Workers' Party of Denmark	379	2.08	+1.33
Communist Party of Denmark	351	1.93	+0.29
Venstre	308	1.69	+0.73
Justice Party of Denmark	271	1.49	-0.95
Danish Unity	120	0.66	New
Total	18,200		

1935 Danish Folketing election

Parties	Vote		
Parties	Votes	%	+ / -
Social Democrats	7,938	43.22	+0.47
Conservatives	7,403	40.30	-2.83
Social Liberals	1,964	10.69	+2.70
Justice Party of Denmark	448	2.44	-0.58
Communist Party of Denmark	301	1.64	+0.24
Venstre	176	0.96	-0.73
National Socialist Workers' Party of Denmark	138	0.75	New
Total	18,368		

1932 Danish Folketing election

Parties	Vote		
Parties	Votes	%	+ / -
Conservatives	7,186	43.13	+1.16
Social Democrats	7,122	42.75	-0.44
Social Liberals	1,331	7.99	-0.44
Justice Party of Denmark	503	3.02	+1.03
Venstre	282	1.69	-2.50
Communist Party of Denmark	233	1.40	+1.15
Curt C. Hansen	4	0.02	New
Total	16,661		

=== General elections in the 1920s ===
1929 Danish Folketing election

Parties	Vote		
Parties	Votes	%	+ / -
Social Democrats	6,674	43.19	+4.31
Conservatives	6,485	41.97	-5.08
Social Liberals	1,302	8.43	-0.94
Venstre	647	4.19	+1.52
Justice Party of Denmark	307	1.99	+0.60
Communist Party of Denmark	38	0.25	-0.38
Total	15,453		

1926 Danish Folketing election

Parties	Vote		
Parties	Votes	%	+ / -
Conservatives	7,213	47.05	+2.82
Social Democrats	5,960	38.88	-0.46
Social Liberals	1,437	9.37	-1.82
Venstre	410	2.67	-0.45
Justice Party of Denmark	213	1.39	+0.44
Communist Party of Denmark	97	0.63	+0.08
Total	15,330		

1924 Danish Folketing election

Parties	Vote		
Parties	Votes	%	+ / -
Conservatives	6,641	44.23	+3.37
Social Democrats	5,908	39.34	+3.01
Social Liberals	1,680	11.19	+1.83
Venstre	469	3.12	-2.51
Justice Party of Denmark	142	0.95	New
Industry Party	94	0.63	-4.19
Communist Party of Denmark	82	0.55	New
Total	15,016		

September 1920 Danish Folketing election

Parties	Vote		
Parties	Votes	%	+ / -
Conservatives	6,099	40.86	-2.62
Social Democrats	5,423	36.33	+1.35
Social Liberals	1,397	9.36	+0.87
Venstre	841	5.63	-0.85
Industry Party	719	4.82	-1.26
Free Social Democrats	361	2.42	New
Danish Left Socialist Party	87	0.58	New
Total	14,927		

July 1920 Danish Folketing election

Parties	Vote		
Parties	Votes	%	+ / -
Conservatives	4,909	43.48	+2.84
Social Democrats	3,949	34.98	+0.86
Social Liberals	959	8.49	+0.22
Venstre	732	6.48	+0.65
Industry Party	686	6.08	-0.60
Henrik Jarlbæk	44	0.39	-0.26
Jensine M. Nielsen-Barbro	6	0.05	New
J. L. Knudsen	5	0.04	New
Th. S. Damsgaard Schmidt	0	0.00	New
Total	11,290		

April 1920 Danish Folketing election

Parties	Vote	
Parties	Votes	%
Conservatives	5,738	40.64
Social Democrats	4,817	34.12
Social Liberals	1,167	8.27
Industry Party	943	6.68
Venstre	823	5.83
Centrum	338	2.39
Free Social Democrats	199	1.41
Henrik Jarlbæk	93	0.66
Total	14,118	

== European Parliament elections results ==
2024 European Parliament election in Denmark

Parties	Vote		
Parties	Votes	%	+ / -
Green Left	6,830	24.81	+3.87
Social Liberals	3,773	13.70	-5.90
Red–Green Alliance	3,411	12.39	+4.94
Social Democrats	2,909	10.57	-3.33
Conservatives	2,720	9.88	+0.46
Venstre	2,476	8.99	-4.94
Liberal Alliance	1,863	6.77	+4.61
Moderates	1,560	5.67	New
The Alternative	1,073	3.90	-2.19
Danish People's Party	617	2.24	-1.94
Denmark Democrats	301	1.09	New
Total	27,533		

2019 European Parliament election in Denmark

Parties	Vote		
Parties	Votes	%	+ / -
Green Left	6,037	20.94	+2.83
Social Liberals	5,652	19.60	+4.55
Venstre	4,017	13.93	+3.15
Social Democrats	4,007	13.90	-5.07
Conservatives	2,716	9.42	-1.46
Red–Green Alliance	2,148	7.45	New
The Alternative	1,757	6.09	New
Danish People's Party	1,204	4.18	-8.78
People's Movement against the EU	670	2.32	-6.64
Liberal Alliance	623	2.16	-2.13
Total	28,831		

2014 European Parliament election in Denmark

Parties	Vote		
Parties	Votes	%	+ / -
Social Democrats	4,590	18.97	+0.32
Green Left	4,382	18.11	-3.96
Social Liberals	3,642	15.05	+5.25
Danish People's Party	3,135	12.96	+3.96
Conservatives	2,631	10.88	-3.08
Venstre	2,608	10.78	-2.73
People's Movement against the EU	2,168	8.96	-0.36
Liberal Alliance	1,037	4.29	+3.27
Total	24,193		

2009 European Parliament election in Denmark

Parties	Vote		
Parties	Votes	%	+ / -
Green Left	5,139	22.07	+10.17
Social Democrats	4,343	18.65	-8.67
Conservatives	3,251	13.96	-0.95
Venstre	3,147	13.51	+0.72
Social Liberals	2,281	9.80	-3.92
People's Movement against the EU	2,171	9.32	+2.94
Danish People's Party	2,095	9.00	+4.33
June Movement	621	2.67	-5.01
Liberal Alliance	238	1.02	New
Total	23,286		

2004 European Parliament election in Denmark

Parties	Vote		
Parties	Votes	%	+ / -
Social Democrats	3,127	27.32	+16.20
Conservatives	1,706	14.91	+3.21
Social Liberals	1,570	13.72	-1.11
Venstre	1,464	12.79	-6.39
Green Left	1,362	11.90	+2.44
June Movement	879	7.68	-7.06
People's Movement against the EU	730	6.38	-2.56
Danish People's Party	535	4.67	-0.80
Christian Democrats	71	0.62	-0.54
Total	11,444		

1999 European Parliament election in Denmark

Parties	Vote		
Parties	Votes	%	+ / -
Venstre	2,246	19.18	+8.20
Social Liberals	1,737	14.83	+4.28
June Movement	1,726	14.74	-2.17
Conservatives	1,370	11.70	-13.73
Social Democrats	1,302	11.12	+1.39
Green Left	1,108	9.46	-0.56
People's Movement against the EU	1,047	8.94	-3.49
Danish People's Party	641	5.47	New
Centre Democrats	399	3.41	+2.29
Christian Democrats	136	1.16	+0.61
Progress Party	42	0.36	-1.92
Total	11,712		

1994 European Parliament election in Denmark

Parties	Vote		
Parties	Votes	%	+ / -
Conservatives	3,074	25.43	+6.37
June Movement	2,044	16.91	New
People's Movement against the EU	1,503	12.43	-12.85
Venstre	1,327	10.98	+0.46
Social Liberals	1,275	10.55	+7.26
Green Left	1,212	10.02	-2.35
Social Democrats	1,176	9.73	-7.31
Progress Party	276	2.28	-1.02
Centre Democrats	136	1.12	-6.35
Christian Democrats	67	0.55	-1.12
Total	12,090		

1989 European Parliament election in Denmark

Parties	Vote		
Parties	Votes	%	+ / -
People's Movement against the EU	2,588	25.28	-3.07
Conservatives	1,951	19.06	-9.01
Social Democrats	1,745	17.04	+3.78
Green Left	1,266	12.37	+1.00
Venstre	1,077	10.52	+7.01
Centre Democrats	765	7.47	+1.52
Progress Party	338	3.30	+0.60
Social Liberals	337	3.29	+0.55
Christian Democrats	171	1.67	+0.39
Total	10,238		

1984 European Parliament election in Denmark

Parties	Vote	
Parties	Votes	%
People's Movement against the EU	3,345	28.35
Conservatives	3,312	28.07
Social Democrats	1,564	13.26
Green Left	1,342	11.37
Centre Democrats	702	5.95
Venstre	414	3.51
Left Socialists	326	2.76
Social Liberals	323	2.74
Progress Party	319	2.70
Christian Democrats	151	1.28
Total	11,798	

== Referendums ==
2022 Danish European Union opt-out referendum

Option	Votes	%
✓ YES	20,180	76.71
X NO	6,126	23.29

2015 Danish European Union opt-out referendum

Option	Votes	%
✓ YES	16,821	60.46
X NO	11,002	39.54

2014 Danish Unified Patent Court membership referendum

Option	Votes	%
✓ YES	15,917	68.08
X NO	7,463	31.92

2009 Danish Act of Succession referendum

Option	Votes	%
✓ YES	16,224	85.05
X NO	2,852	14.95

2000 Danish euro referendum

Option	Votes	%
✓ YES	9,842	54.53
X NO	8,206	45.47

1998 Danish Amsterdam Treaty referendum

Option	Votes	%
✓ YES	9,343	58.59
X NO	6,603	41.41

1993 Danish Maastricht Treaty referendum

Option	Votes	%
✓ YES	10,074	56.20
X NO	7,850	43.80

1992 Danish Maastricht Treaty referendum

Option	Votes	%
✓ YES	8,738	50.62
X NO	8,525	49.38

1986 Danish Single European Act referendum

Option	Votes	%
✓ YES	8,147	51.60
X NO	7,641	48.40

1972 Danish European Communities membership referendum

Option	Votes	%
✓ YES	12,655	61.36
X NO	7,970	38.64

1953 Danish constitutional and electoral age referendum

Option	Votes	%
✓ YES	9,488	69.15
X NO	4,233	30.85
23 years	8,492	61.69
21 years	5,274	38.31

1939 Danish constitutional referendum

Option	Votes	%
✓ YES	12,284	89.73
X NO	1,406	10.27
