= Kristensen Cabinet =

Danish cabinet between 1945 and 1947

Cabinet of Knud Kristensen
- 43rd Cabinet of Denmark

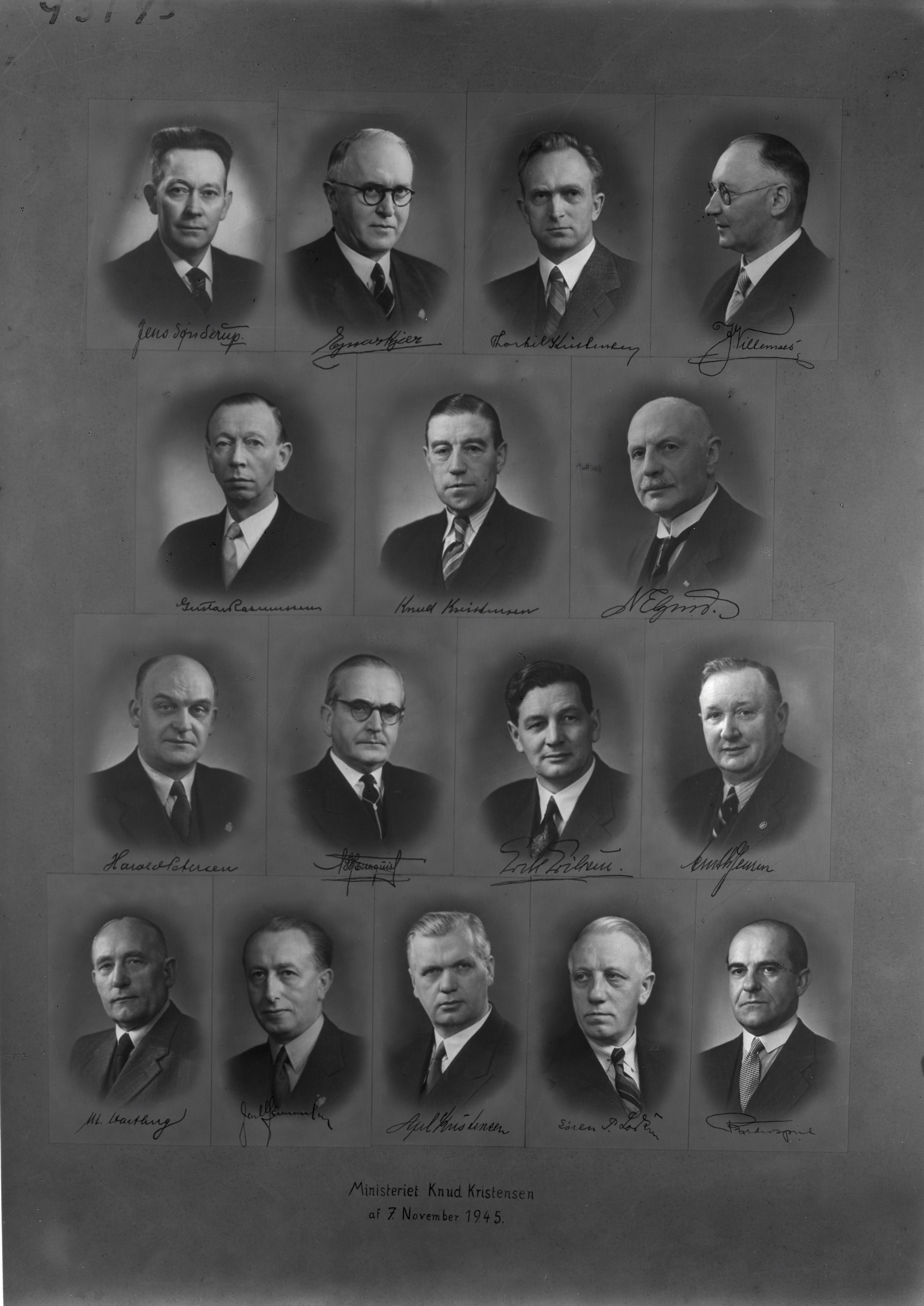
- Composition of the cabinet
- Date formed: 7 November 1945
- Date dissolved: 13 November 1947

People and organisations
- Monarch: Christian X; Frederik IX
- Prime Minister: Knud Kristensen
- No. of ministers: 14
- Total no. of members: 17
- Member party: Venstre
- Status in legislature: Single-party minority

History
- Election: 1945
- Outgoing election: 1947
- Predecessor: Buhl II
- Successor: Hedtoft I

The Cabinet of Knud Kristensen was the government of Denmark from 7 November 1945 to 13 November 1947. The minority cabinet was, except for the foreign minister, fully composed of members of Venstre, led by Knud Kristensen. It was formed after the October 1945 elections, the first since the end of the Second World War.

== List of ministers ==
Cabinet members
Portfolio	Minister	Took office	Left office	Party	Ref
Prime Minister	Knud Kristensen	7 November 1945	13 November 1947	Venstre	
Minister of Foreign Affairs	Gustav Rasmussen	7 November 1945	13 November 1947	Independent	
Minister of Finance	Thorkil Kristensen	7 November 1945	13 November 1947	Venstre	
Minister of Defence	Harald Petersen	7 November 1945	13 November 1947	Venstre	
Minister of Ecclesiastical Affairs	Mads Hartling (act.)	7 November 1945	12 November 1945	Venstre	
Minister of Ecclesiastical Affairs	Carl Martin Hermansen	12 November 1945	13 November 1947	Venstre	
Minister of Education	Mads Hartling	7 November 1945	13 November 1947	Venstre	
Minister of Justice	Aage Elmquist	7 November 1945	13 November 1947	Venstre	
Minister of the Interior	Ejnar Martin Kjær	7 November 1945	18 June 1947	Venstre	
Minister of the Interior	Niels Ejlert Arnth-Jensen	30 June 1947	13 November 1947	Venstre	
Minister of Public Works	Niels Elgaard	7 November 1945	13 November 1947	Venstre	
Minister for Agriculture and Fisheries	Erik Eriksen	7 November 1945	13 November 1947	Venstre	
Minister of Industry, Trade, and Seafaring	Jens Villemoes	7 November 1945	6 September 1947	Venstre	
Minister of Industry, Trade, and Seafaring	Axel Kristensen	6 September 1947	13 November 1947	Venstre	
Minister of Public Utilities	Axel Kristensen	24 April 1947	13 November 1947	Venstre	
Minister of Labour and Social Affairs	Søren Peter Larsen	7 November 1945	24 April 1947	Venstre	
Minister of Labour and Social Affairs	Jens Sønderup	24 April 1947	13 November 1947	Venstre	
Minister for Special Affairs	Per Federspiel	24 April 1947	13 November 1947	Venstre	

Preceded by Buhl II	Cabinet of Denmark; 1945-1947	Succeeded by Hedtoft I
