= Erik Eriksen =

Danish politician

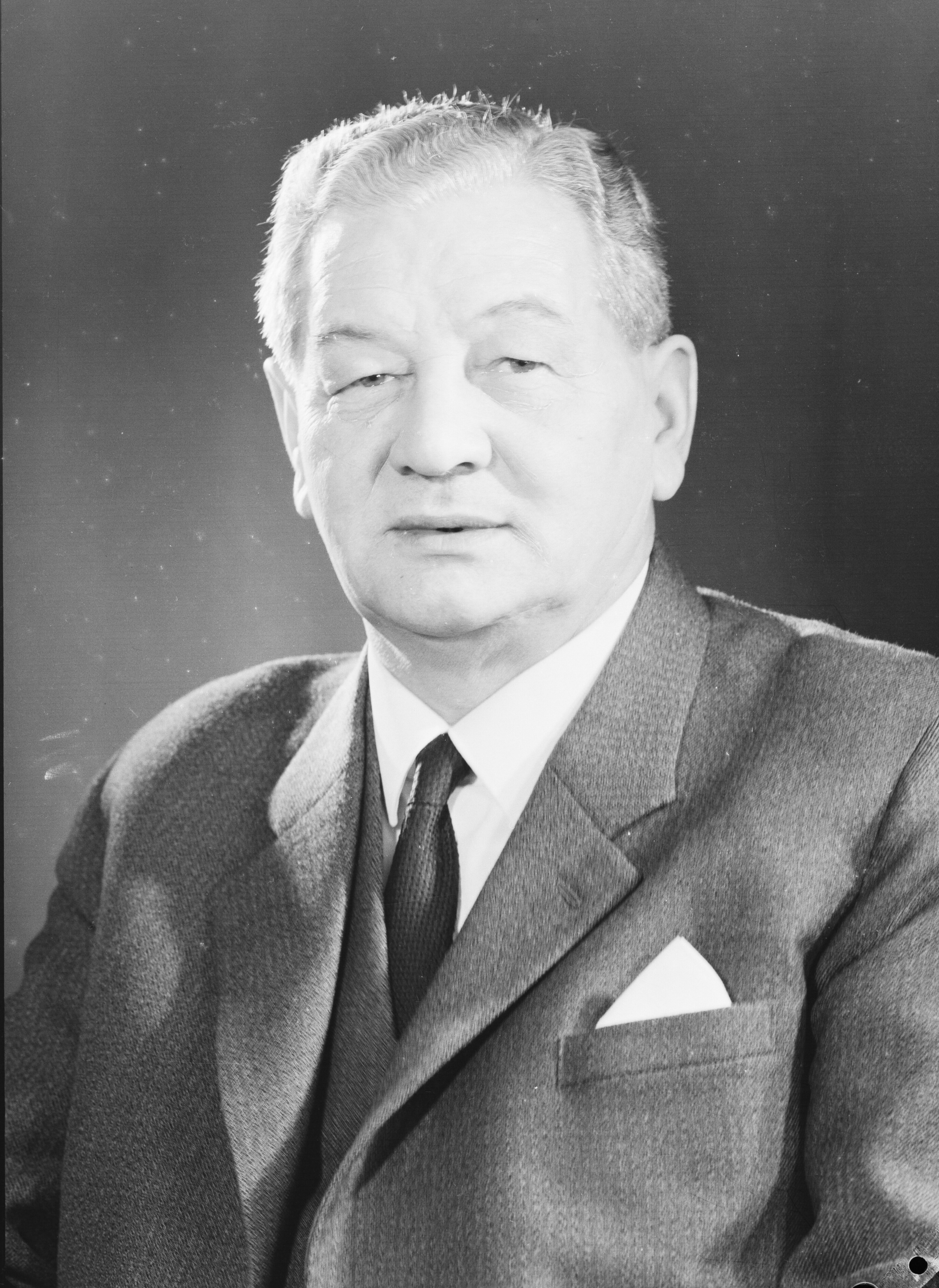

Prime Minister of Denmark
- In office 30 October 1950 – 30 September 1953
- Monarch: Frederik IX
- Preceded by: Hans Hedtoft
- Succeeded by: Hans Hedtoft

President of the Nordic Council
- In office 1 January 1956 – 31 December 1956
- Preceded by: Nils Herlitz
- Succeeded by: Lennart Heljas

Leader of Venstre
- In office 1950–1965
- Preceded by: Edvard Sørensen
- Succeeded by: Poul Hartling

Minister of Agriculture and Fishing
- In office 5 May 1945 – 13 November 1947
- Prime Minister: Vilhelm Buhl; Knud Kristensen
- Preceded by: Kristen Bording
- Succeeded by: Kristen Bording

Personal details
- Born: 20 November 1902 Brangstrup, Ringe, Denmark
- Died: 7 October 1972 (aged 69) Esbjerg, Denmark
- Party: Venstre
- Spouse: Else Hansen

Erik Eriksen (20 November 1902 – 7 October 1972) was a Danish politician, who served as the prime minister of Denmark from 1950 to 1953 and as the president of the Nordic Council in 1956. Eriksen was leader of the Danish Liberal party Venstre from 1950 to 1965. He served as Prime Minister of Denmark from 30 October 1950 to 30 September 1953 as leader of the Eriksen cabinet forming a minority government of Venstre and the Conservative People's Party. Eriksen was a farmer by profession.

The main accomplishment by his government was a revision of the Danish constitution, voted into law in a referendum held in 1953 simultaneously with the parliamentary elections. In addition, a family allowance law was passed in 1952, along with other reforms during Eriksen's time as prime minister. The Rent Act of June 1951, while permitting certain rent increases, extended rent control and security of tenure to cover houses constructed after 1939. In addition, the Public Assistance Act of March 1953 introduced special treatment and assistance for patients with polio. The former Venstre leader and former Prime Minister Knud Kristensen had broken away from Venstre to form his own party, De Uafhængige. This was one of reasons why the social democrat Hans Hedtoft was able to secure the parliamentary support to replace Eriksen as Prime Minister and form the Hedtoft cabinet.

After 1953, Eriksen continued as the leader of the opposition but in the long run his consequent alliance with the Conservatives proved an obstacle to a co-operation with the Radical Left Party. He therefore resigned as the leader of his party in 1965 and was succeeded by Poul Hartling.

Political offices
Preceded by Hans Hedtoft	Prime Minister of Denmark; 1950–1953	Succeeded by Hans Hedtoft
Party political offices
Preceded by Edvard Sørensen	Leader of Venstre; 1950–1965	Succeeded by Poul Hartling
