= EDV (disambiguation) =

EDV or Edv may refer to:

- End-diastolic volume, the volume of blood in the right or left ventricle at end of filling in diastole
- Rivian EDV, a battery-electric cargo vehicle built by Rivian
- EDV engine, a Chrysler engine
- Edv. or Edvard
  - Jens Edv. Haugland, a Norwegian politician
  - Edv. Sørensen, a Danish politician
