= 1945 Danish Folketing election =

Election for the lower house of Danish Parliament

- 30 October 1945
- All 149 seats in the Folketing; 75 seats needed for a majority
Party	Leader	Vote %	Seats	+/–
Social Democrats	Hans Hedtoft	32.78	48	−18
Venstre	Knud Kristensen	23.38	38	+10
Conservatives	Christmas Møller	18.24	26	−5
Communists	Aksel Larsen	12.46	18	New
Social Liberals	Jørgen Jørgensen	8.15	11	−2
Danish Unity	Arne Sørensen	3.11	4	+1
Justice	Oluf Pedersen	1.88	3	+1
Elected in the Faroe Islands
Independent (F)	Jóannes Patursson	46.19	1	0
This lists parties that won seats. See the complete results below.
Prime Minister before	Prime Minister-elect
Vilhelm Buhl; Social Democrats	Knud Kristensen; Venstre

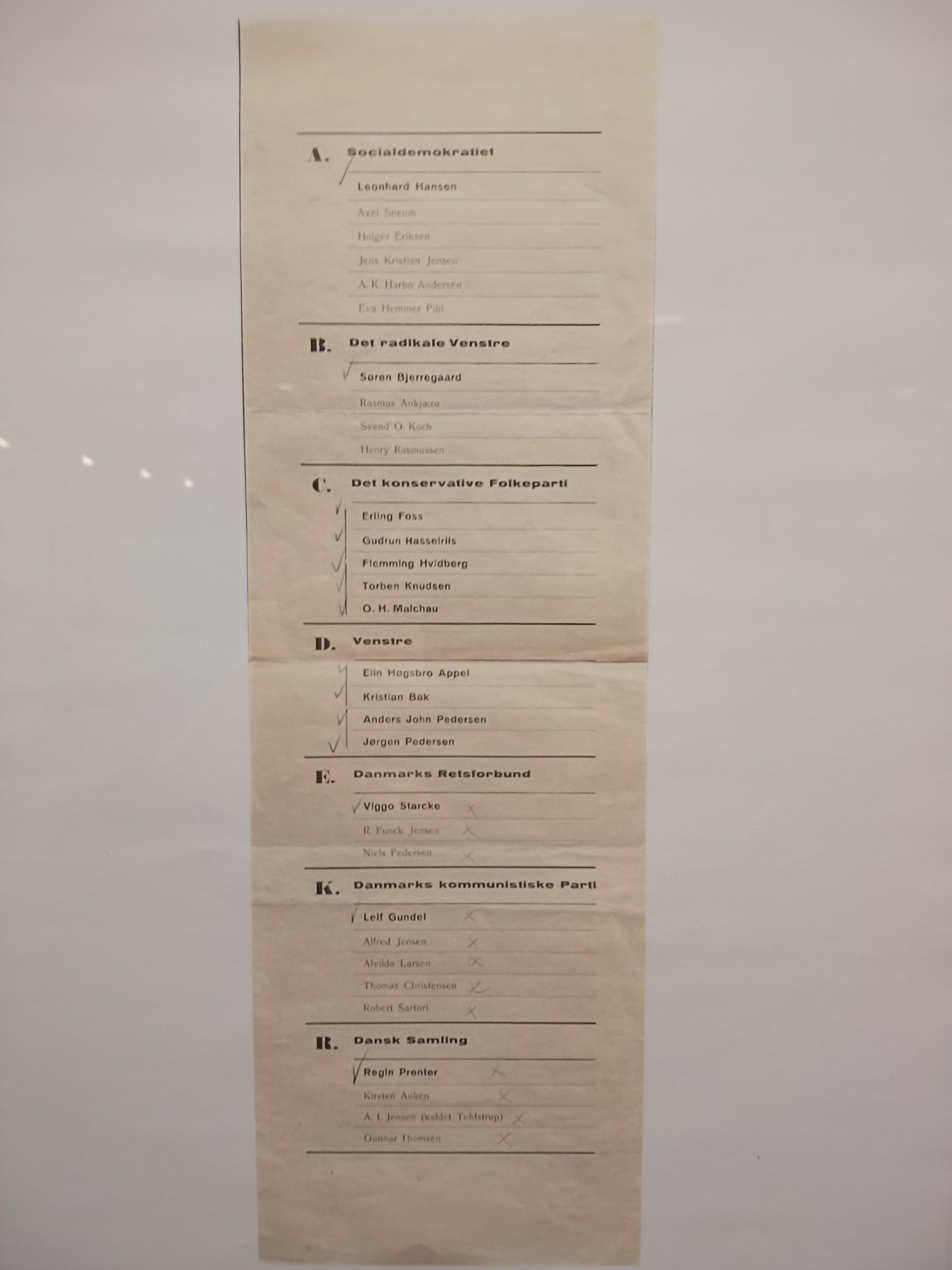
Ballot paper of election

Folketing elections were held alongside Landsting elections in Denmark on 30 October 1945, except in the Faroe Islands where they were held on 20 November. The Social Democratic Party remained the largest in the Folketing, with 48 of the 149 seats. Voter turnout was 86% in Denmark proper and 57% in the Faroes.

The election resulted in the formation of a Venstre minority government with Knud Kristensen as prime minister. This lasted until the 1947 Folketing election, when the Social Democrats returned to government under Hans Hedtoft.

== Results ==
Party	Votes	%	Seats	+/–
Denmark proper
Social Democrats	671,755	32.78	48	–18
Venstre	479,158	23.38	38	+10
Conservative People's Party	373,688	18.24	26	–5
Communist Party of Denmark	255,236	12.46	18	New
Danish Social Liberal Party	167,073	8.15	11	–2
Danish Unity	63,760	3.11	4	+1
Justice Party of Denmark	38,459	1.88	3	+1
Independents	55	0.00	0	0
Total	2,049,184	100.00	148	0
Valid votes	2,049,184	99.70		
Invalid/blank votes	6,131	0.30		
Total votes	2,055,315	100.00		
Registered voters/turnout	2,381,983	86.29		
Faroe Islands
Independent (People's Party)	3,990	46.19	1	0
Social Democratic–Self-Government	2,521	29.18	0	0
Independent (Union Party)	2,127	24.62	0	0
Total	8,638	100.00	1	0
Valid votes	8,638	99.86		
Invalid/blank votes	12	0.14		
Total votes	8,650	100.00		
Registered voters/turnout	15,084	57.35		
Source: Nohlen & Stöver
