= Ejnar Martin Kjær =

Danish teacher and politician (1893–1947)

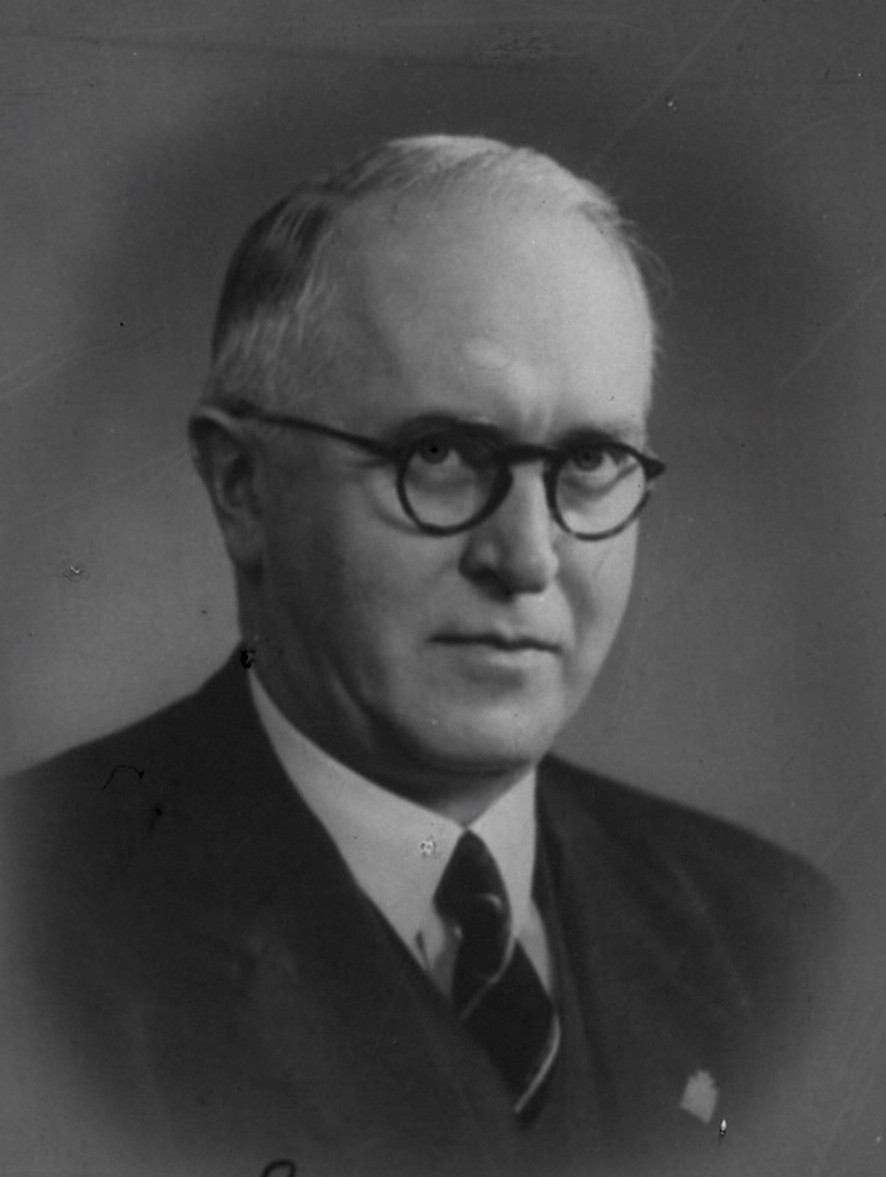

Minister of Interior
- In office 1945 – 18 June 1947
- Prime Minister: Knud Kristensen

Personal details
- Born: 9 January 1893 Ullits
- Died: 18 June 1947 (aged 54) Copenhagen
- Resting place: Brønderslev
- Party: Venstre
- Profession: Educator

Ejnar Martin Kjær (1893–1947) was a Danish teacher and politician who served as the minister of interior in the period between 1945 and 1947. He died when he was in office

== Biography ==
Kjær was born in Ullits on 9 January 1893. In 1915 he received a teaching diploma and worked as a teacher and then a librarian in Brønderslev until 1935 when he was elected to the Parliament. He served there until 1943. He was appointed minister of interior to the cabinet led by Prime Minister Knud Kristensen in 1945. He was one of the right-wing members of the cabinet. He supported the suggestions to improve the treatment of mental illness using new psychiatric approaches and techniques. Kjær died at a hospital in Copenhagen on 18 June 1947 while serving in the post and was buried in Brønderslev.

Kjær married two times. His first wife died in 1930, and he married second time in 1931.
