= Ella Gudrun Ingeborg Holleufer =

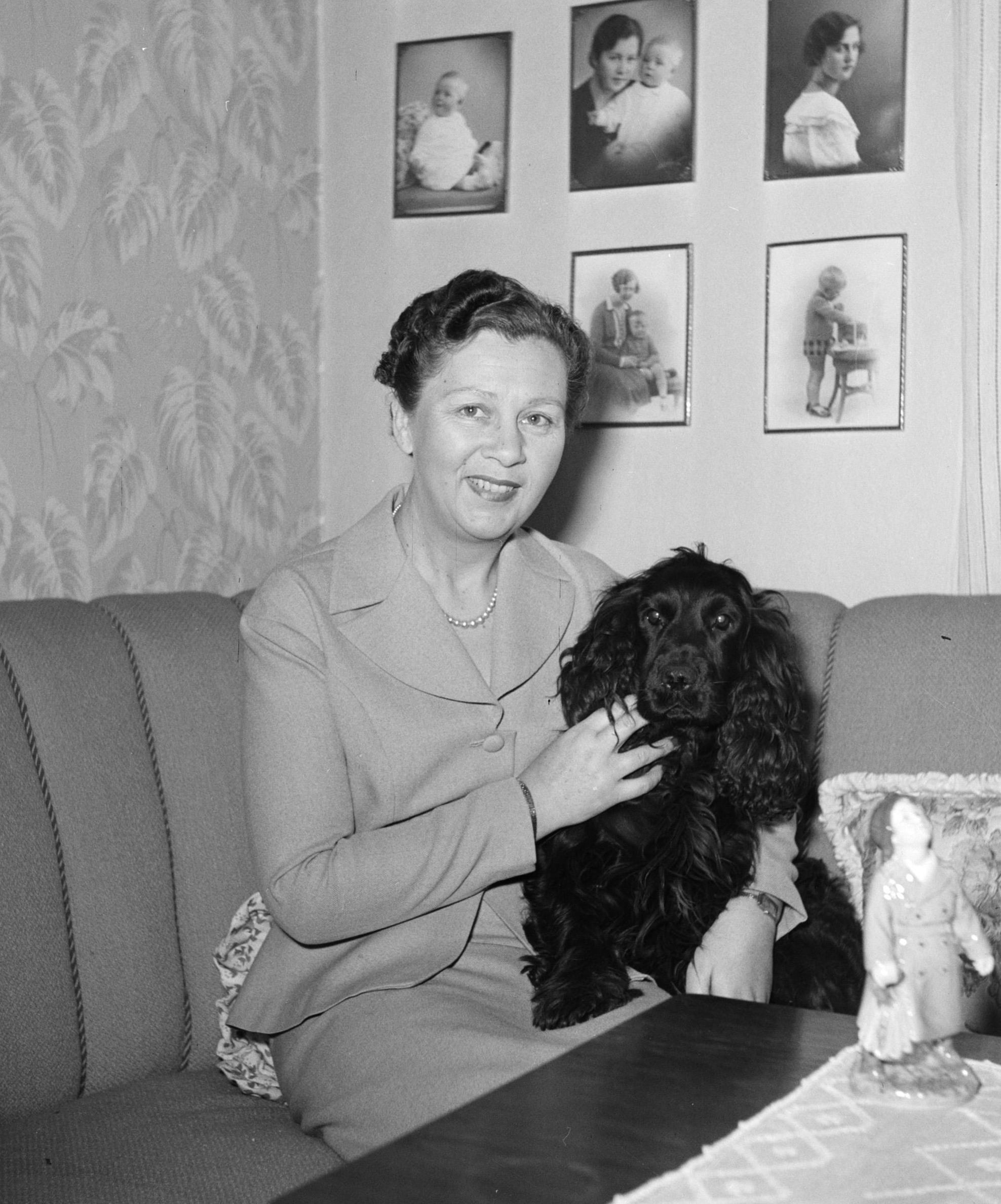
Ella Hedtoft at home, 1954

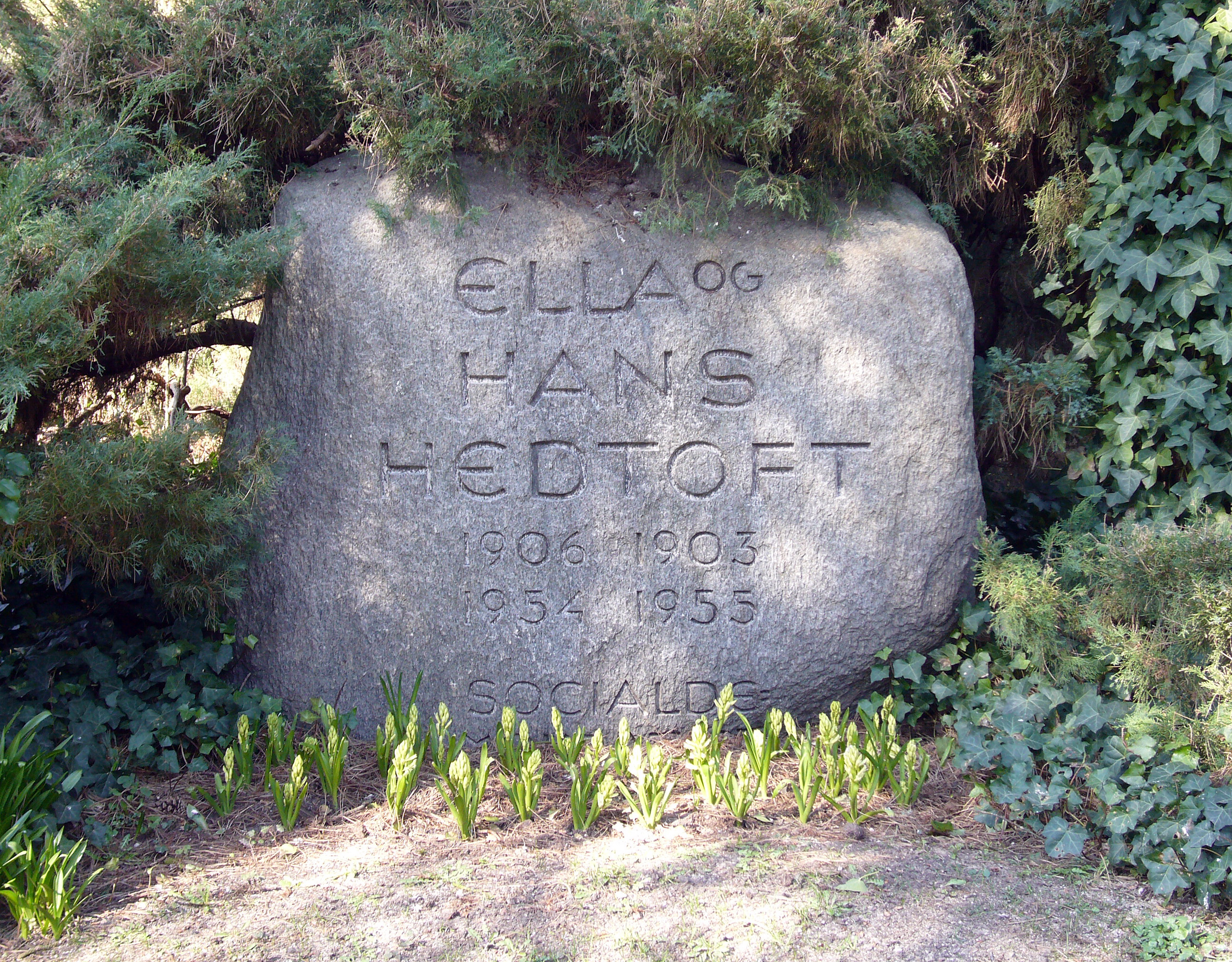
Grave of Hans and Ella Hedtoft at the Vestre Cemetery in Copenhagen

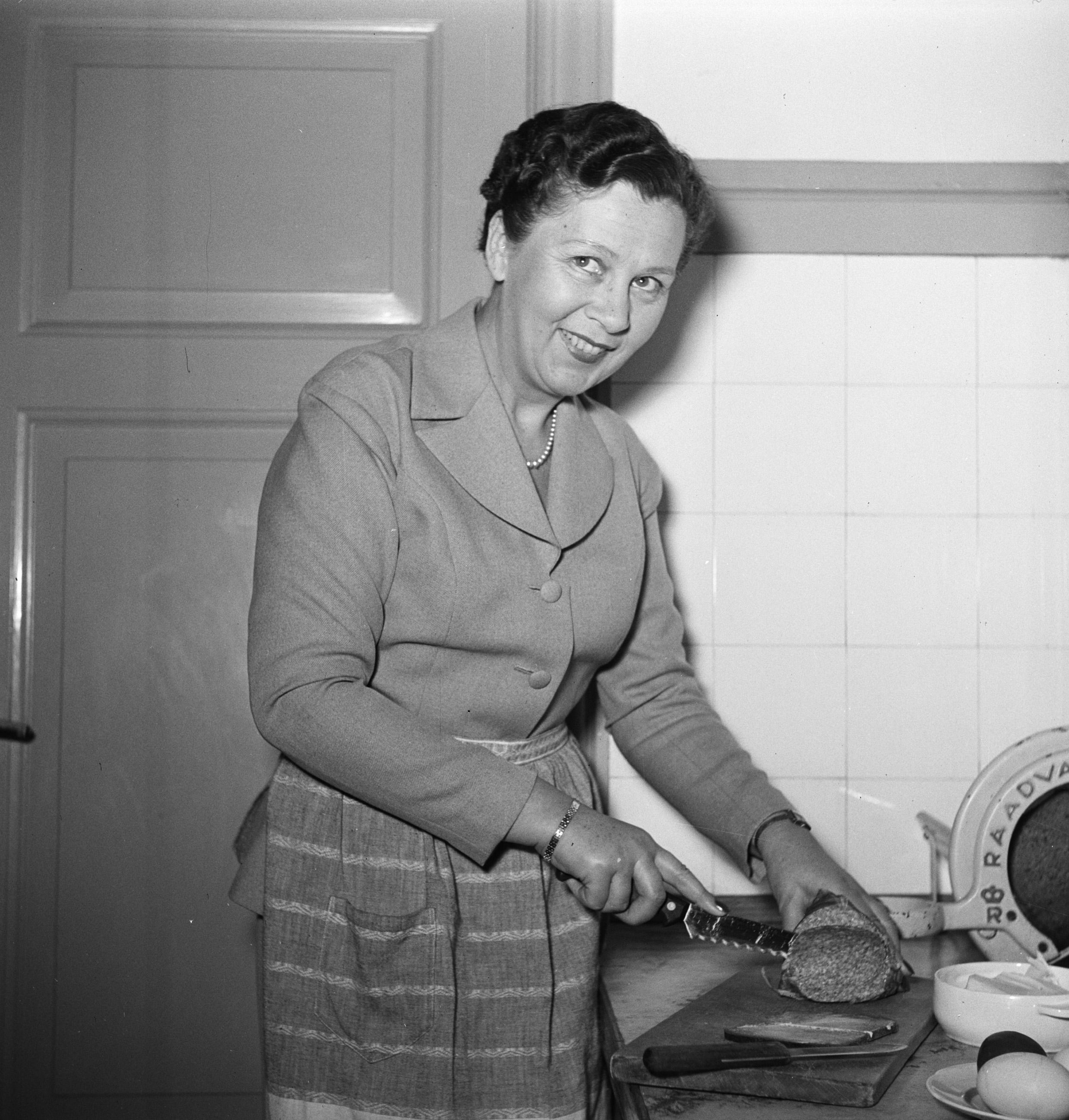
Ella Hedtoft at home, 1954

Ella Gudrun Ingeborg Holleufer (March 22, 1906 – December 4, 1954) was married to the two time Prime Minister of Denmark, Hans Hedtoft.

She was born in Aarhus in Denmark as the daughter of the baker August Holleufer, and her mother Dorthea Marie was one of the leading suffragettes in Denmark at the end of the 19th century.

Ella Hedtoft died after suffering from Addison's disease for years and was buried at Vestre Kirkegård in Copenhagen, in a section where leading social democrats and members of the workers unions are buried.

== Sources ==
- Leif Thorsen: Hans Hedtoft – En biografi. Odense Universitetsforlag 1998.
- The Holleufer Family (article written by journalist Torben Holleufer, Copenhagen, Denmark – son of Jørgen Holleufer, nephew of Hans & Ella Hedtoft).
