= Vilhelm Buhl =

Danish politician (1881–1954)

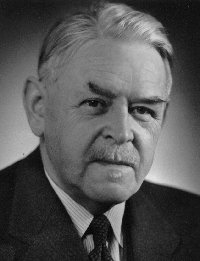

Prime Minister of Denmark
- In office 5 May 1945 – 7 November 1945
- Monarch: Christian X
- Preceded by: German military rule Erik Scavenius (last prime minister)
- Succeeded by: Knud Kristensen
- In office 4 May 1942 – 9 November 1942
- Monarch: Christian X
- Preceded by: Thorvald Stauning
- Succeeded by: Erik Scavenius

Minister for Finance
- In office 20 July 1937 – 16 July 1942
- Prime Minister: Thorvald Stauning; Himself
- Preceded by: Hans Peter Hansen
- Succeeded by: Alsing Andersen

Personal details
- Born: 16 October 1881 Fredericia, Denmark
- Died: 18 December 1954 (aged 73) Copenhagen, Denmark
- Resting place: Vestre Cemetery in Copenhagen
- Party: Social Democratic Party
- Spouse: Thyra Schmidt (m. 1908)
- Children: 4
- Education: University of Copenhagen (M.L.)

Vilhelm Buhl (16 October 1881 – 18 December 1954) was a Danish politician, who served twice as Prime Minister of Denmark, from May–November 1942 during the German occupation period, and again after Denmark's liberation from May–November 1945.

After graduation and serving as collector of taxes in Copenhagen in the 1920s, Buhl joined the Social Democratic Party (Socialdemokratiet), and entered parliament in 1932. In the same year, he became Minister of Finance in the cabinet of Thorvald Stauning. Following Germany's occupation of his country during World War II, Buhl was a determined opponent of Denmark’s forced adherence to the renewed Anti-Comintern Pact with the Axis powers in 1941. Buhl began his first term as prime minister after Stauning's death in 1942, which lasted about six months until his resignation following poor relations with the Germans.

On 5 May 1945 after Adolf Hitler's suicide and Danish Liberation Day, Buhl began his second term as prime minister of the first post-war government, also popularly known as the Liberation Cabinet (Danish: Befrielsesregeringen), which lasted about six months until he resigned from office on 7 November of the same year. In the minority Social Democratic government of Hans Hedtoft, Buhl served as the Minister of Economic Coordination from 1947 to 1950, and concurrently as Minister of Justice from March to September 1950. Buhl retired from politics for health reasons after the 1953 elections. He died on 18 December 1954, at the age of 73.

== Early life ==
Buhl was born on 16 October 1881 in Fredericia, Denmark, the son of Magdalene Augusta (née Johanne) (1860–1891) and farm owner Hans Peter Buhl (1853–1894). Buhl was one of five siblings. As a student, Buhl co-founded the Legal Discussion Club in 1903. Five years later, in 1908, he graduated from the University of Copenhagen with a Master of Laws degree.

On 20 November 1908, Buhl married Thyra Thygesen Schmidt (b. 29 January 1880 – d. 11 March 1959), and they had four children: Søren Peder Thygesen (1910–1975), Knud (1911–1991), Gerda Martha Magdalene (1914–1993), and Jens (1915–1986).

== Political career ==
Buhl joined the Social Democrats while a law student at the University of Copenhagen. He was elected to the upper house of parliament in 1932, and then the lower house in 1939. He served as Minister of Finance in the cabinet of Thorvald Stauning from 20 July 1937 until 3 May 1942.

At the beginning of World War II and after the German occupation of Denmark, the government did not establish a government-in-exile in the United Kingdom, as did their neighbor Norway and several other smaller countries. Instead, King Christian remained in Denmark, and Thorvald Stauning created a Unity government that operated with relative independence until August 1943.

When Thorvald Stauning died during the war on 3 May 1942, Buhl succeeded him as prime minister. However, Buhl's government only lasted six months, due to a diplomatic incident (the Telegram Crisis) where King Christian X sent a short and terse reply to a long birthday telegram from Adolf Hitler, who took offense. Consequently, a tough new Nazi commander, Werner Best, was sent to Denmark, and Buhl had poor relations with the Germans. As a result, he resigned on 7 November of the same year, and was replaced by Erik Scavenius.

On 5 May 1945 just three days before VE-Day, many Danish politicians and resistance fighters formed a Liberation Government, which marked the beginning of post-war government after the death of Adolf Hitler on 30 April. Resistance fighters were included because many Danes were dissatisfied with how politicians had cooperation with Germans at the start of the Occupation. Notable members of Buhl's liberation cabinet included Aksel Larsen (communist leader), Hans Hedtoft (future prime minister), H. C. Hansen (future prime minister), Knud Kristensen (future prime minister), and John Christmas Møller (conservative foreign minister). In social policy, the Danish government presided over the passage of the Housing Obligation Act of August 1945, which introduced the obligatory allocation of vacant housing to ensure that vacant flats were let in the first instance to those with low incomes, while also establishing tight rent controls. The Danish government also presided over the trials of Danes who had cooperated with the Germans, which resulted in 45 people being executed. After the October 1945 elections, Buhl resigned from office on 7 November, and was replaced as prime minister by center-right leader Knud Kristensen.

Under the Social Democratic government of Hans Hedtoft, Buhl served as the Minister of Economic Coordination from 1947 to 1950, and also concurrently served as the Minister of Justice from March to September 1950.

Prior to the 1953 elections, Buhl retired from politics, citing health issues.

== Death ==
Buhl died of a heart attack at his home in Copenhagen on 18 December 1954, at the age of 73. He was interred in Vestre Cemetery.

Political offices
Preceded by Hans Peter Hansen	Finance Minister of Denmark; 1937-07-20 – 1942-07-16	Succeeded by Alsing Emanuel Andersen
Preceded by Thorvald Stauning	Prime Minister of Denmark; 1942-05-04 – 1942-11-09	Succeeded by Erik Scavenius
Preceded by German military rule (last Prime Minister: Erik Scavenius)	Prime Minister of Denmark; 1945-05-05 – 1945-11-07	Succeeded by Knud Kristensen
Preceded by German military rule (last Foreign Minister: Erik Scavenius)	Foreign Minister of Denmark; 1945-05-05 – 1945-05-07	Succeeded by John Christmas Møller
Preceded by Niels Busch-Jensen	Justice Minister of Denmark; 1950-02-25 – 1950-03-04	Succeeded by Karl Kristian Steincke
