= 1947 Danish Folketing election =

Election for the lower house of Danish Parliament

- 28 October 1947
- All 150 seats in the Folketing; 76 seats needed for a majority
| Party | Leader | Vote % | Seats | +/– |
|---|---|---|---|---|
| Social Democrats | Hans Hedtoft | 40.02 | 57 | +9 |
| Venstre | Knud Kristensen | 27.58 | 49 | +11 |
| Conservatives | Ole Bjørn Kraft | 12.44 | 17 | −9 |
| Social Liberals | Jørgen Jørgensen | 6.92 | 10 | −1 |
| Communists | Aksel Larsen | 6.77 | 9 | −9 |
| Justice | Oluf Pedersen | 4.54 | 6 | +3 |
Elected in the Faroe Islands
| People's | Thorstein Petersen | 42.68 | 1 | 0 |
| Union | Andrass Samuelsen | 28.43 | 1 | +1 |
This lists parties that won seats. See the complete results below.
| Prime Minister before | Prime Minister-elect |
|---|---|
| Knud Kristensen; Venstre | Hans Hedtoft; Social Democrats |

Folketing elections were held in Denmark on 28 October 1947, except in the Faroe Islands where they were held on 18 February 1948. The Social Democratic Party remained the largest in the Folketing, with 57 of the 150 seats. Voter turnout was 86% in Denmark proper and 60% in the Faroes.

== Electoral system changes ==
Following legislation in December 1947 the representation of the Faroe Islands constituency was increased from one seat to two. The two seats were elected using proportional representation with the D'Hondt method.

== Results ==
| Party | Votes | % | Seats | +/– |
Denmark proper
| Social Democrats | 834,089 | 40.02 | 57 | +9 |
| Venstre | 529,066 | 25.39 | 46 | +8 |
| Conservative People's Party | 259,324 | 12.44 | 17 | –9 |
| Danish Social Liberal Party | 144,206 | 6.92 | 10 | –1 |
| Communist Party of Denmark | 141,094 | 6.77 | 9 | –9 |
| Justice Party of Denmark | 94,570 | 4.54 | 6 | +3 |
| Capital Venstre (Note: The Copenhagen branch of Venstre ran as a separate party in order to exploit the electoral law and was able to win compensatory seats. Following the election the other parties grouped together to push for changes to the system which were passed in 1948.) | 45,829 | 2.20 | 3 | New |
| Danish Unity | 24,724 | 1.19 | 0 | –4 |
| Schleswig Party | 7,464 | 0.36 | 0 | New |
| Independents | 3,775 | 0.18 | 0 | 0 |
| Total | 2,084,141 | 100.00 | 148 | 0 |
| Valid votes | 2,084,141 | 99.77 | | |
| Invalid/blank votes | 4,874 | 0.23 | | |
| Total votes | 2,089,015 | 100.00 | | |
| Registered voters/turnout | 2,435,306 | 85.78 | | |
Faroe Islands
| People's Party | 4,135 | 42.68 | 1 | 0 |
| Union Party | 2,754 | 28.43 | 1 | +1 |
| Social Democratic Party | 1,990 | 20.54 | 0 | 0 |
| Self-Government | 809 | 8.35 | 0 | 0 |
| Total | 9,688 | 100.00 | 2 | +1 |
| Valid votes | 9,688 | 99.65 | | |
| Invalid/blank votes | 34 | 0.35 | | |
| Total votes | 9,722 | 100.00 | | |
| Registered voters/turnout | 16,169 | 60.13 | | |
Source: Nohlen & Stöver
