= Edvard Sørensen =

Danish politician (1893–1954)

Niels Edvard Sørensen (August 29, 1893 – May 15, 1954) was a Danish politician representing the Liberal party, Venstre. He served briefly as party chairman 1949 – 1950.

Sørensen was born in Lindbjerg near Randers. He was a Member of Folketinget representing Aalborg County from April 24, 1929, standing in Bælum constituency.

Party political offices
Preceded by Knud Kristensen	Leader of Venstre; 1949–1950	Succeeded by Erik Eriksen
