= Hans Hedtoft =

Prime Minister of Denmark (1903–1955)

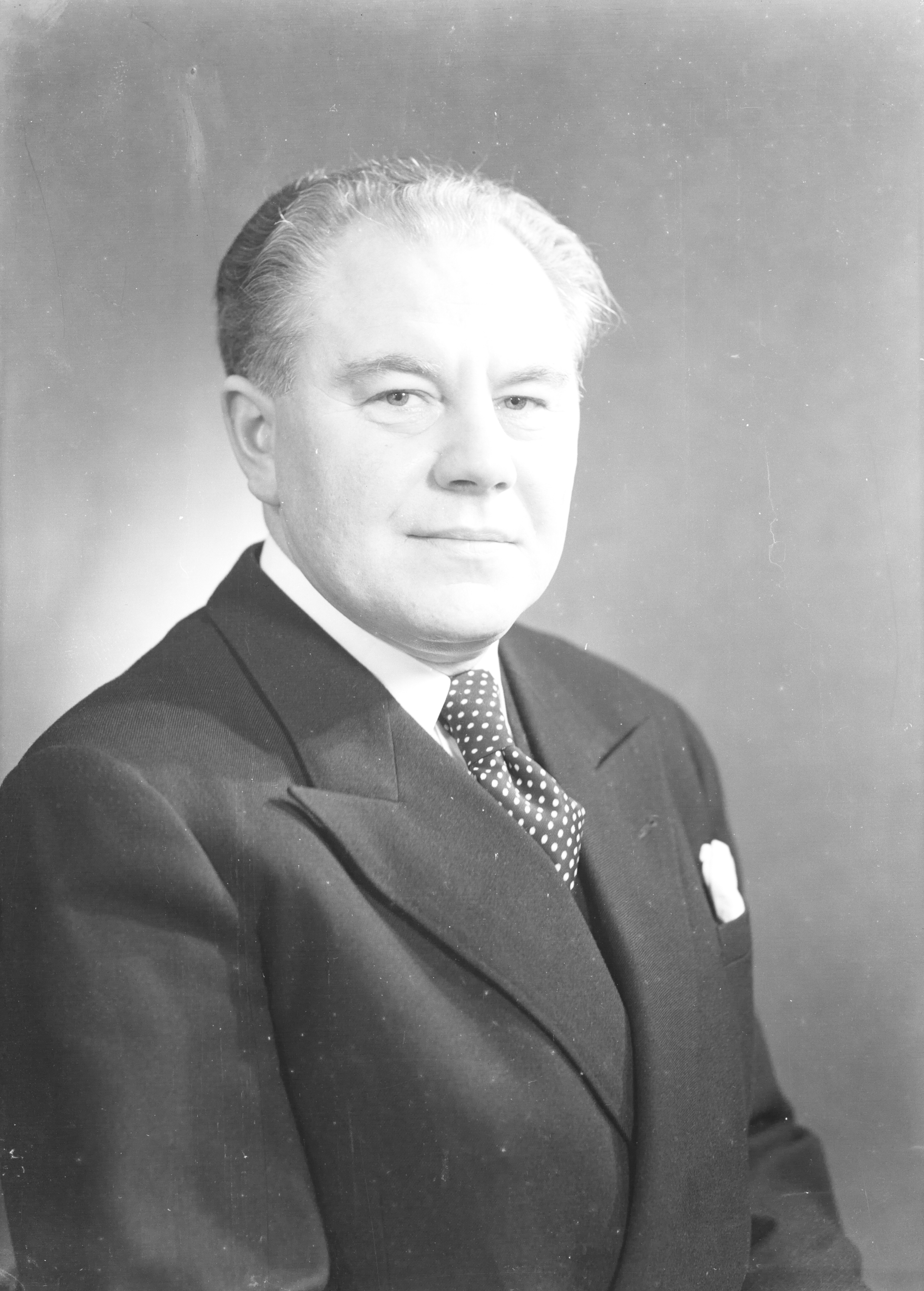

Prime Minister of Denmark
- In office 30 September 1953 – 29 January 1955
- Monarch: Frederik IX
- Preceded by: Erik Eriksen
- Succeeded by: H. C. Hansen
- In office 13 November 1947 – 30 October 1950
- Monarch: Frederik IX
- Preceded by: Knud Kristensen
- Succeeded by: Erik Eriksen

President of the Nordic Council
- In office 14 February 1953 – 31 December 1953
- Preceded by: Position established
- Succeeded by: Einar Gerhardsen

Minister of Social Affairs
- In office 5 May 1945 – 7 November 1945
- Prime Minister: Vilhelm Buhl
- Preceded by: Laurits Hansen
- Succeeded by: Søren Peter Larsen

Personal details
- Born: 21 April 1903 Aarhus, Denmark
- Died: 29 January 1955 (aged 51) Stockholm, Sweden
- Party: Social Democrats
- Spouse: Ella Gudrun Ingeborg Holleufer

Hans Hedtoft Hansen (21 April 1903 – 29 January 1955) was a Danish politician of the Social Democrats who served as the prime minister of Denmark from 1947 to 1950 and again from 1953 until his death in 1955. He also served as the first president of the Nordic Council in 1953.

Hedtoft was married to Ella Gudrun Ingeborg Holleufer. She died in 1954 from Addison's disease, aged 48.

== Political career ==
Hedtoft was a Social Democrat, and had taken over the leadership of his party from Thorvald Stauning in 1939, but was forced by the Nazis to resign his posts in 1941 because he was too critical of the German occupation of Denmark. In September 1943, he was instrumental in starting the rescue of the Danish Jews.

During his time as prime minister, progressive taxation was introduced, together with other reforms. The Public Assistance Act of April 1949 introduced special treatment and assistance (transferred from communal assistance or poor relief) for TB patients, while the law on measures for the deaf and dumb of January 1950 introduced special provisions for the deaf and partially deaf within the framework for the special care of handicapped persons. In addition, the Home Help Act of April 1949 obliged municipalities to operate home help services, while regulations relating to pottery factories were issued.

After the failure to create a Scandinavian defence union, Denmark joined NATO in 1949. In October 1950 his government lost a vote on lifting the rationing of butter. Because this failure to get his policy through signalled that his party had lost its parliamentary support, new elections were called. Erik Eriksen from the Liberal Party was able to form the Cabinet of Erik Eriksen together with the Conservative People's Party on 30 October 1950.

On 30 September 1953 Hedtoft was able to return as prime minister, and formed the Cabinet of Hans Hedtoft II, consisting only of the Social Democrats. He did not have the support of the Danish Social Liberal Party as they were unsatisfied with the large amount of resources allocated to the military because of Denmark's obligations to NATO.

On 29 January 1955 Hedtoft died suddenly from a heart attack while in a meeting in the Nordic Council in Stockholm. He was succeeded as prime minister by his friend and Foreign Minister H. C. Hansen. The liner MS Hans Hedtoft was named after him. The ship sank on its maiden voyage in 1959, the ship struck an iceberg and sank off the coast of Greenland. It is the last ship known to have been sunk by an iceberg, with casualties. There were no survivors.

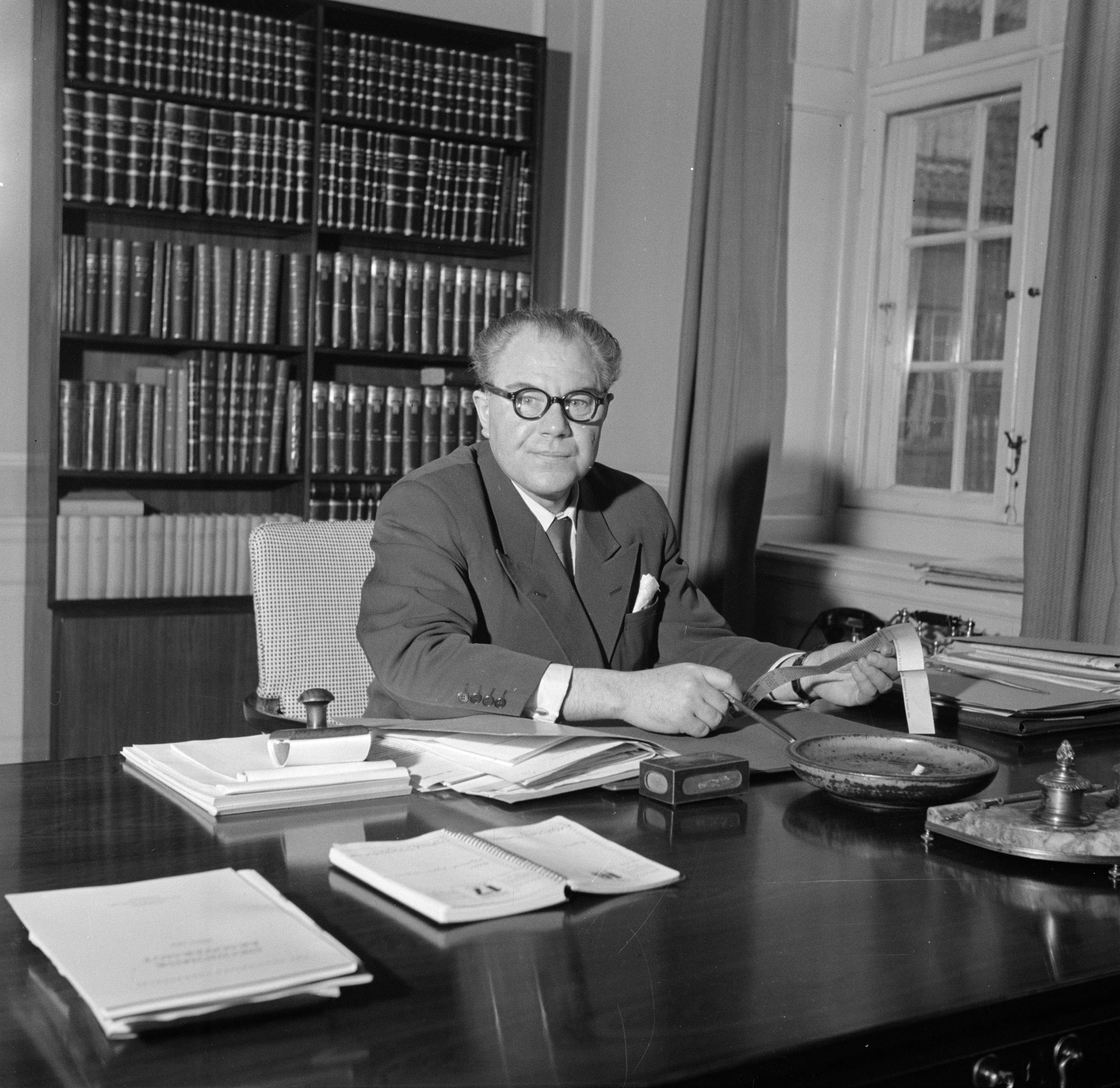
Hans Hedtoft in his office, Copenhagen, 1954

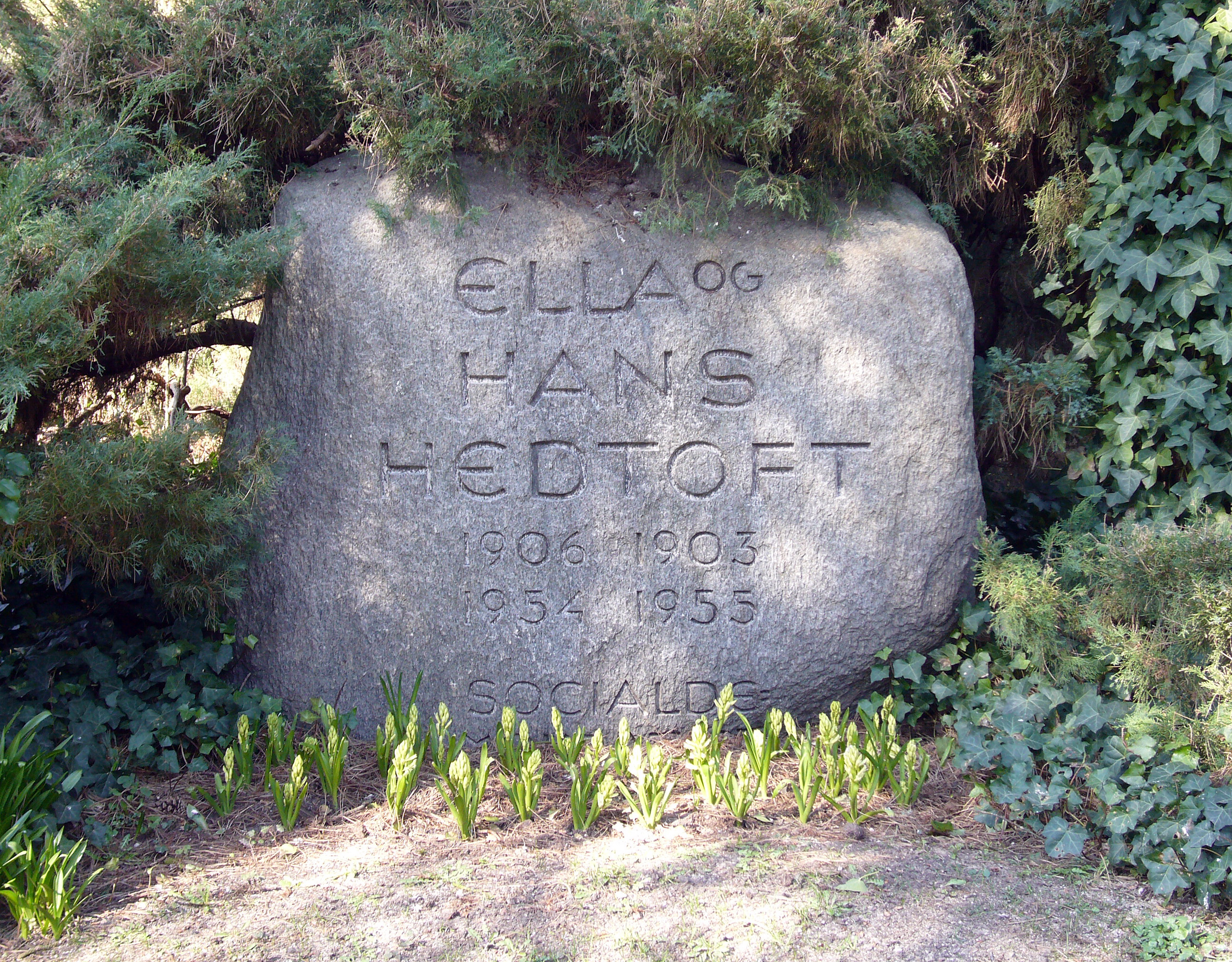
Grave of Hans and Ella Hedtoft at the Vestre Cemetery in Copenhagen

Political offices
Preceded by Laurits Hansen	Minister of Social Affairs; 5 May 1945 – 7 November 1945	Succeeded by Søren P. Larsen
Preceded by Knud Kristensen	Prime Minister of Denmark; 13 November 1947 – 30 October 1950	Succeeded by Erik Eriksen
Preceded by Erik Eriksen	Prime Minister of Denmark; 30 September 1953 – 29 January 1955	Succeeded by H. C. Hansen
Party political offices
Preceded by Thorvald Stauning	Leader of the Danish Social Democrats; 1939–1955	Succeeded by H. C. Hansen
