= Knud Kristensen =

Danish politician (1880–1962)

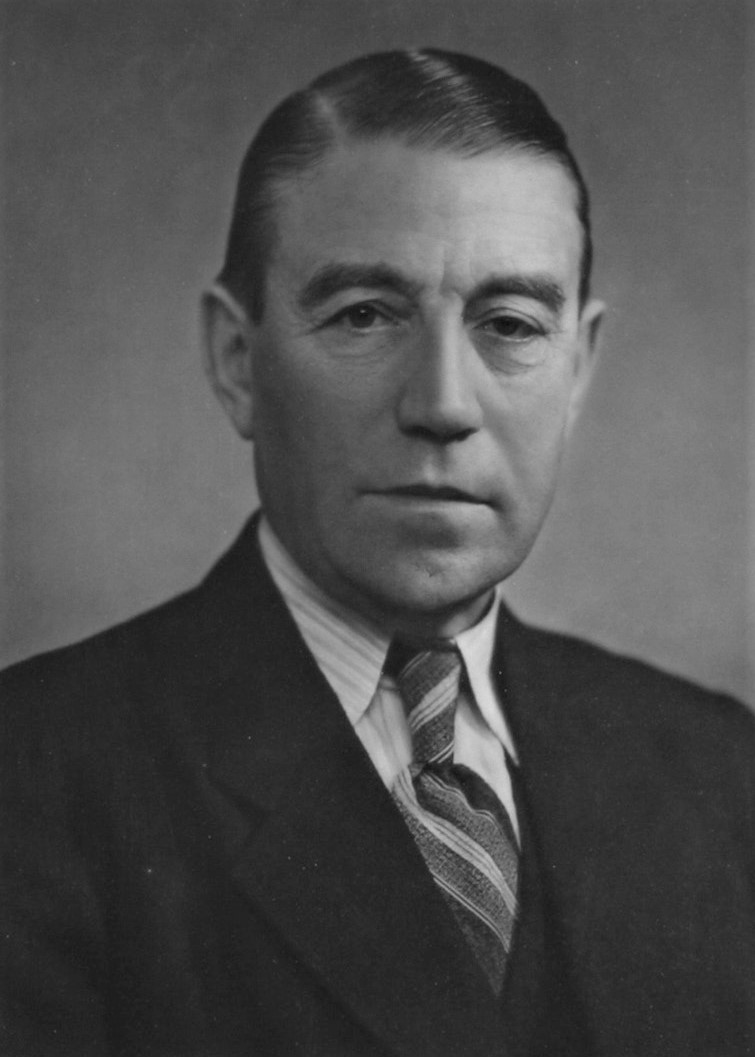

Prime Minister of Denmark
- In office 7 November 1945 – 13 November 1947
- Monarchs: Christian X Frederik IX
- Preceded by: Vilhelm Buhl
- Succeeded by: Hans Hedtoft

Personal details
- Born: 26 October 1880 Ringkøbing
- Died: 28 September 1962 (aged 81) Humlebæk
- Party: Independent Party From 1953
- Other political affiliations: Venstre Until 1953

Knud Kristensen (26 October 1880 – 28 September 1962) was Prime Minister of Denmark from 7 November 1945 to 13 November 1947 in the first elected government after the German occupation of Denmark during World War II. After the October 1945 election, Knud Kristensen formed the Cabinet of Knud Kristensen (Danish: Regeringen Knud Kristensen), a minority government consisting only of his liberal party (Danish: Venstre).

== Biography ==
Knud Kristensen was educated in agriculture and was a farmer by profession. He was from 1901 to 1902 a student at Frederiksborg University College, 1903–04 at Dalum Agricultural School and 1906–07 at Askov Folk High School. In 1907–20, he owned a farm at Ødsted in Vejle, then Biviumgård in Humlebæk. He was first elected to the parliament in 1920. He was re-elected from 1932 until he resigned on 15 January 1949.

In social policy, Kristensen's time as Prime minister saw the passage of the National Social Insurance act of June 1946, which raised benefits and, although it increased the age limit for old age pensions for men from 60 to 65, it granted old-age pensions to people from the age of 60 in cases of ill-health or special circumstances. Under the Building Subsidy Act of April 1946 low interest rates were made available to central government to support housing construction for the needy, while rent supplements were introduced for families with smaller children.

Kristensen resigned as Prime Minister when the Folketing passed a vote of no confidence because of his failed enthusiasm for incorporating Southern Schleswig into Denmark. Denmark was forced to cede Schleswig and Holstein in the second war of Schleswig in 1864, and had recovered parts of Northern Schleswig in the aftermath of World War I as a result of the Schleswig Plebiscite, but had failed to regain Southern Schleswig. Denmark's new attempt of re-annexation in the vacuum of power after WW2 was unsuccessful due to the opposition of South Schleswig's inhabitants. German public opinion was supported by the British military governor Hugh Champion de Crespigny who feared the chaos that would arise in view of the doubled German population within the area after ingesting expellees of former German territories handed to Poland.

The defeat in the Southern Schleswig case estranged Kristensen from his party and when the new constitution was issued 1953 he terminated his membership of Venstre and founded a new party, the Independent Party (Danish: De Uafhængige). This new party was unable to gain influence.

== Other sources ==
- Kristian Hvidt (1995) Statsministre i Danmark fra 1913 til 1995 (Copenhagen: Nyt nordisk forlag A. Busck) ISBN 9788717065703
- Hanne Eriksen (1978) Partiet De Uafhængige 1953-1960 (Odense Universitetsforlag) ISBN 87-7492-235-1.

Political offices
Preceded by Bertel Dahlgaard	Interior Minister of Denmark; 8 July 1940 – 9 November 1942	Succeeded by Jørgen Jørgensen
Preceded by none (Jørgen Jørgensen)	Interior Minister of Denmark; 5 May 1945 – 7 November 1945	Succeeded by Ejnar Martin Kjær
Preceded by Vilhelm Buhl	Prime Minister of Denmark; 7 November 1945 – 13 November 1947	Succeeded by Hans Hedtoft
Party political offices
Preceded by Thomas Madsen-Mygdal	Leader of Venstre; 1941–1949	Succeeded by Edvard Sørensen
Preceded by Party founded	Leader of the Independent Party; 1953–1956	Succeeded by ?
