= Oluf Pedersen (politician) =

Danish politician

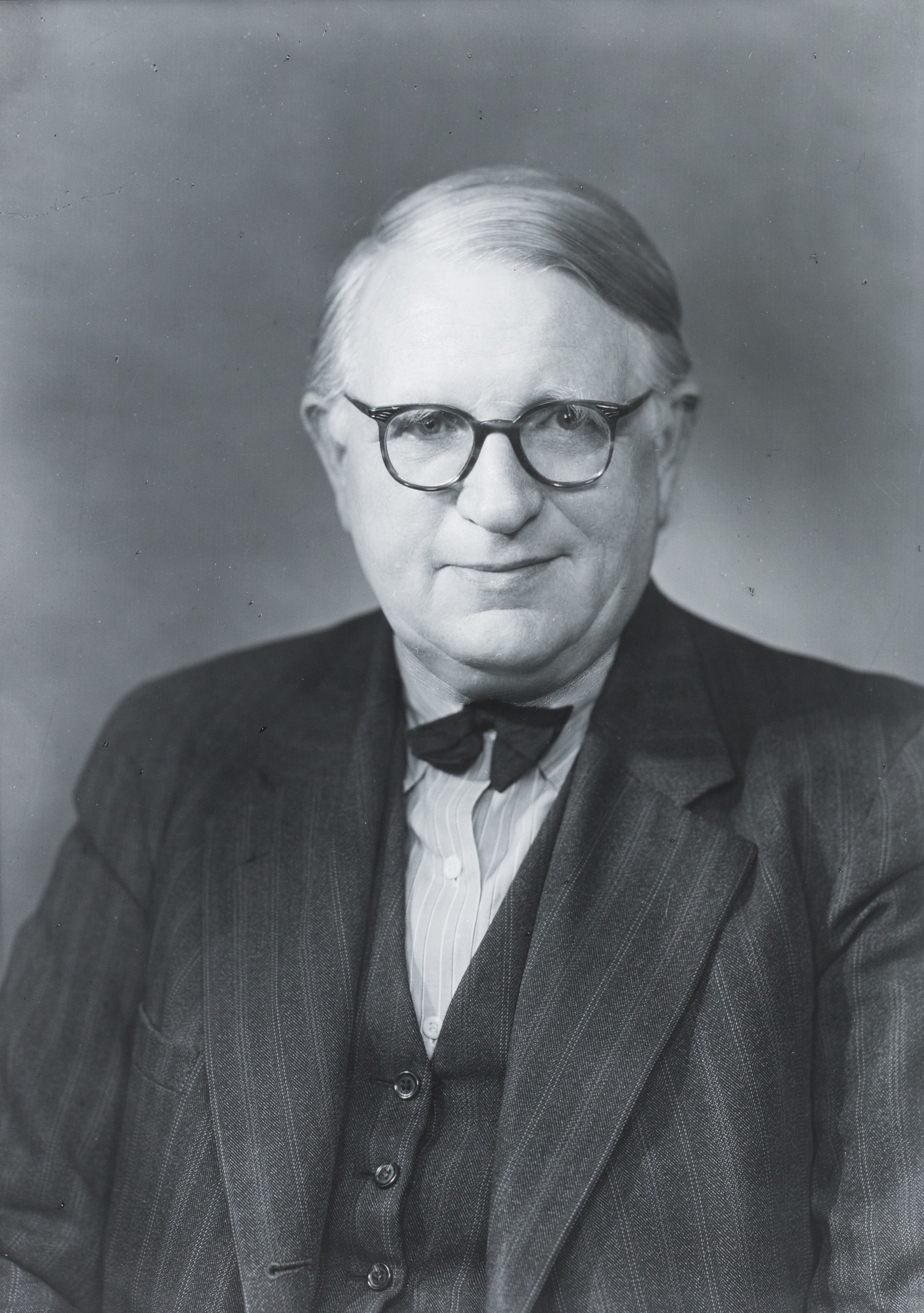
Oluf Pedersen

Oluf Pedersen (6 September 1891 in Lille Rørbæk near Frederikssund – 3 October 1970) was a Danish politician from the Justice Party of Denmark (Danmarks Retsforbund). He was a member of the Folketing 1932-45 and 1950–60 and Minister of Fishery in the cabinet of H.C. Hansen II (1957–60) and the cabinet of Viggo Kampmann I (1960).

Privately he was a gardening consultant and fruit producer. After editing a single tax proposal with Jakob E. Lange, which the Radical Liberal Party rejected, he switched to the Justice Party in 1928.

During the German occupation of Denmark from 1940 to 45 he was secretary of the Parliamentary Cooperation Committee ('Nine Man Committee'), a cross-party body of the democratic parties which was a link between Parliament and the government in questions regarding the occupation.

Oluf Pedersen was a staunch opponent of the reinstitution of the death penalty in the Danish purge after World War II. His energetic opposition caused indignation and made him enemies in the former resistance movement. He received a letter with death threats which caused much attention in the press.
