= Stauning =

Stauning may refer to:

- Stauning (village), village in Western Jutland, Denmark
- Thorvald Stauning (1873 – 1942), the first social democratic prime minister of Denmark
- Stauning Alps, large system of mountain ranges in Scoresby Land, King Christian X Land, northeastern Greenland
- Stauning Whisky, whisky distillery in Denmark
- Stauning I Cabinet, government of Denmark
- Stauning II Cabinet, government of Denmark
- Stauning III Cabinet, government of Denmark
- Stauning VI Cabinet, government of Denmark
- Stauning or Chaos, famous Danish poster and slogan from the parliamentary election of 1935

== See also ==
- Stanning
