= John Stanning =

John Stanning may refer to:

- John Stanning senior (1877–1929), English cricketer in Lord Hawke's cricket team in Australia and New Zealand in 1902–03
- John Stanning junior (1919–2007), English cricketer
