= Stanning =

Stanning is a surname which may refer to:

- Heather Stanning (born 1985), British rower
- Henry Stanning (1881–1946), English cricketer
- John Stanning senior (1877–1929), English cricketer
- John Stanning junior (1919–2007), English cricketer

== See also ==
- Fan (person) § "Stan" fans
- Stauning
