= Amt =

Type of administrative division governing a group of municipalities in Germany

Amt is a type of administrative division governing a group of municipalities, today only in Germany, but formerly also common in other countries of Northern Europe. Its size and functions differ by country and era: the former Nordic amter were roughly equivalent to a British or U.S. county, while the modern German Amt is a smaller union of municipalities below the district level.

== Current usage ==
=== Germany ===
==== Prevalence ====
The Amt (plural: Ämter) is found in the German Bundesländer (federal states) of Schleswig-Holstein, Mecklenburg-Western Pomerania and Brandenburg.

Other German states had this division in the past. Some states have similar administrative units called Samtgemeinde (Lower Saxony), Verbandsgemeinde (Rhineland-Palatinate) or Verwaltungsgemeinschaft (Baden-Württemberg, Bavaria, Saxony, Saxony-Anhalt, Thuringia).

==== Definition ====
An Amt, as well as the other above-mentioned units, is subordinate to a Kreis (district) and is a collection of municipalities. The amt is lower than district-level government but higher than municipal government, and may be described as a supra-municipality or "municipal confederation". Normally, it consists of very small municipalities (Gemeinden, plural of Gemeinde) that join together for administrative tasks.

Larger municipalities do not belong to an Amt and are called amtsfreie Gemeinden (independent municipalities); some of these municipalities might also not be governed by or linked with a Kreis (district) and are called kreisfreie Gemeinden, and when they do also not belong to any other Land they are also called Stadtstaaten (plural of Stadtstaat), i.e. city-states (Berlin and Hamburg).

These large municipalities (cities, in German Städte, plural of Stadt) may be further divided into local offices named Ortsämter (plural of Ortsamt), each of them possibly grouping several suburbs (or small townships in rural areas) of the municipality named Ortsteile (plural of Ortsteil), named from small villages or hamlets or localities. The Ortsteil (suburb or township) may have been a former parish, but today it is meant only for civil purpose and essentially used for planning within the municipality; the Ortsamt (sometimes just named informally but confusingly as an Amt, or informally translated as an "urban district") is used to offer decentralized services of the municipality within local administrative offices for the residents in neighbouring suburbs. The Ortsteil itself may also be confusingly translated as a "municipality", but it is incorrect because it belongs to a city which is the only effective municipality (Gemeinde).

== Former usage ==
=== Denmark ===
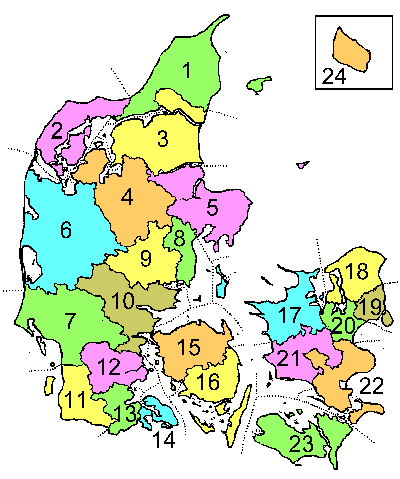
Map of the counties 1793–1970 (Southern Jutland counties, numbered 11–14, only from 1920)

The amt (plural, amter; translated as "county") was an administrative unit of Denmark (and, historically, of Denmark-Norway). The counties were established by royal decree in 1662 as replacements for the former fiefs (Len), a designation long used in the duchies of Schleswig-Holstein. The amter were originally composed of market towns (købstæder) and parishes, and held only small areas of responsibility. There were some changes to the borders of these counties over time, most notably when Roskilde County (da) was merged into Copenhagen County (da) in 1808, and when Skanderborg County (da) was periodically merged into Århus County (da). After Southern Jutland was returned to Denmark after the 1920 Schleswig plebiscites, four new counties were created in the area.

During the 20th century, the powers of the counties were expanded, when they were granted responsibility for the hospital service. The købstæder, which by this time had been separated from the counties and were overseen by the Interior Ministry, assumed the same responsibility. As the population became increasingly urbanized, and many rural communities came to rely on the hospital services of the købstader without paying taxes for them, it became evident that reform was necessary. In 1958, interior minister Søren Olesen set in motion administrative reforms that would culminate in 1970.

The municipal reform of 1 April 1970 reduced the number of counties to fourteen and eliminated the administrative distinction between (rural) parish and town. From then on, the amter were composed of a number of municipalities (kommuner). The reform granted the counties wider areas of responsibility, most notably running the national health service and the gymnasium secondary schools.

The municipal reform of 1 January 2007 abolished the amter and replaced them with five administrative regions, now mainly charged with running the national health service. In contrast to the amter, the regions hold no authority to levy taxes. The reform re-delegated all other areas of responsibility to either the municipalities or the state. At the same time, smaller municipalities were merged into larger units, cutting the number of municipalities from 270 to 98.

=== Germany ===
In Germany an Amt was a medieval administrative district covering a manorial estate or the land owned by a castle or village. It was headed by an Amtmann, usually a lesser nobleman or cleric, appointed by a territorial lord to administer and dispense justice within the Amt.

=== Iceland ===
While Iceland was a territory of the Danish-Norwegian realm, amts (singular: amt; plural: ömt) were established in the country on top of the existing counties. From 1684 to 1770, Iceland as whole was a single amt in the Kingdom of Denmark-Norway but was then split into two amts: North and East Amt (Norður- og Austuramt) and South and West Amt (Suður- og Vesturamt). The latter was in 1787 split into a West Amt (Vesturamt) and South Amt (Suðuramt). Iceland was thus divided into three amts until 1872, when the South and West amts were again merged. Amts were abolished in 1904, when Iceland gained home rule from Denmark.

Amts are not used to denote a geographical region in Iceland but the name lives on in the names of two public libraries in Iceland that were established during the amt era. The Amts libraries in Akureyri and Stykkishólmur which were established as the designated archives for the North and East Amt and the West Amt respectively.

=== Netherlands and Flanders ===
In the Low Countries, the Dutch cognate ambacht denoted a rural district with its own administration and lower justice, exercised by a schout on behalf of the lord (ambachtsheer). Such ambachten existed in Holland, Zeeland and Flanders until about 1800, and survive in place names such as Bergambacht and the Vier Ambachten.

=== Norway ===
From 1662 to 1919, the counties of Norway were called amter. They are now referred to as fylker, a term revived from the Middle Ages.
