= Carl Petersen (Danish politician) =

Danish politician

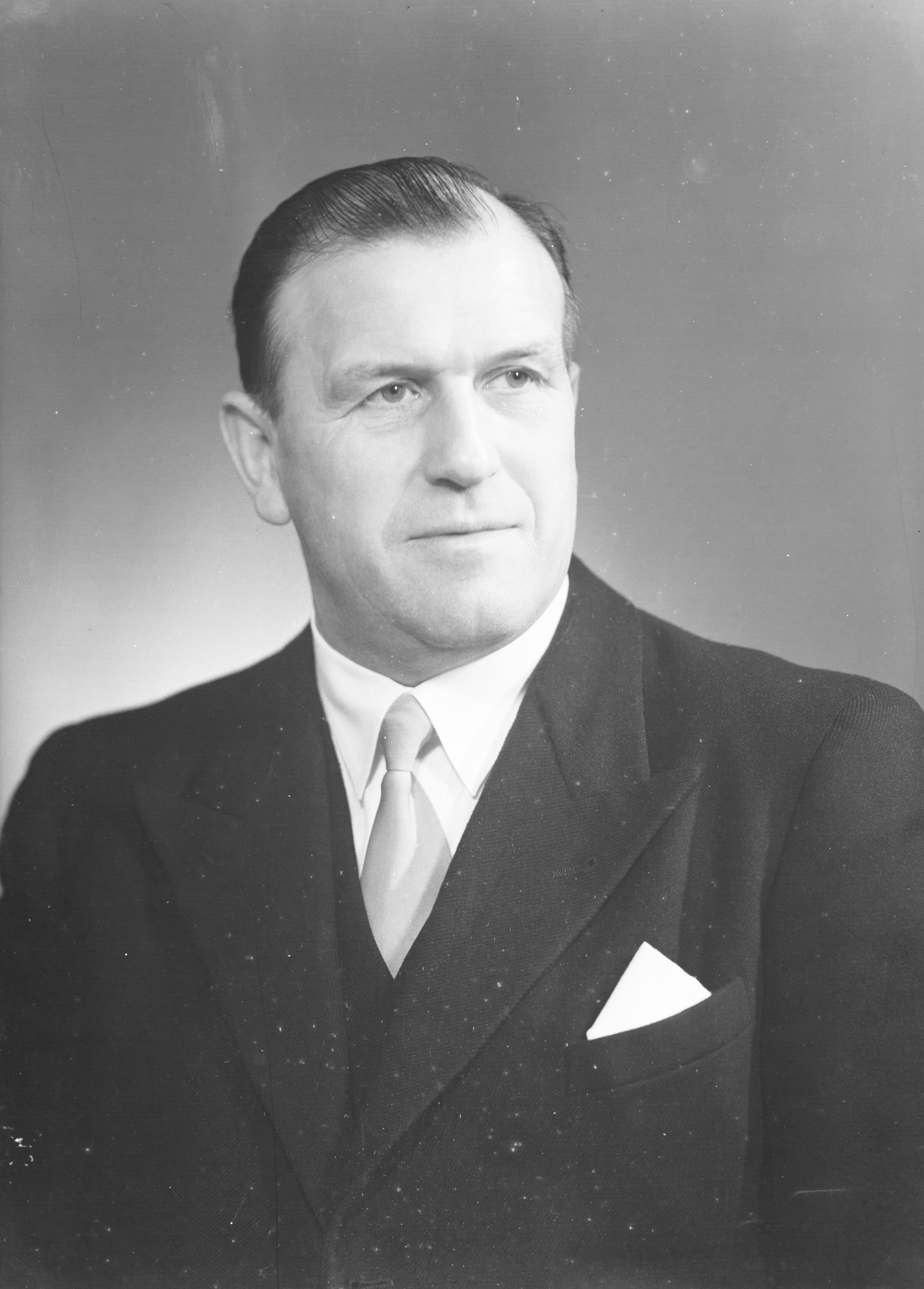
Petersen, 1953

Carl Petersen (1 May 1894 – 21 May 1984) was a Danish politician, representing the Social Democratic Party in Parliament (Folketinget). He served as Minister for Public Works in 1945, 1947 to 1950 and again from 1953 to 1955, Minister for Agriculture in 1950, and Minister of the Interior from 30 August 1955 to 28 May 1957.

Political offices
Preceded by Gunnar Larsen; Niels Elgaard; Jørgen Jørgensen	Minister for Public Works; 5 May 1945 – 7 November 1945; 13 November 1947 – 17 September 1950; 30 September 1953 – 30 August 1955	Succeeded by Niels Elgaard; Frede Nielsen; Kai Lindberg
Preceded by Kristen Bording	Minister for Agriculture; 16 September 1950 – 30 October 1950	Succeeded by Søren Olesen
Preceded by Johannes Kjærbøl	Minister of the Interior; 30 August 1955 – 28 May 1957	Succeeded by Søren Olesen
