= Stauning II Cabinet =

Danish government from 1929 to 1935

Second Stauning cabinet
- 35th Cabinet of Denmark

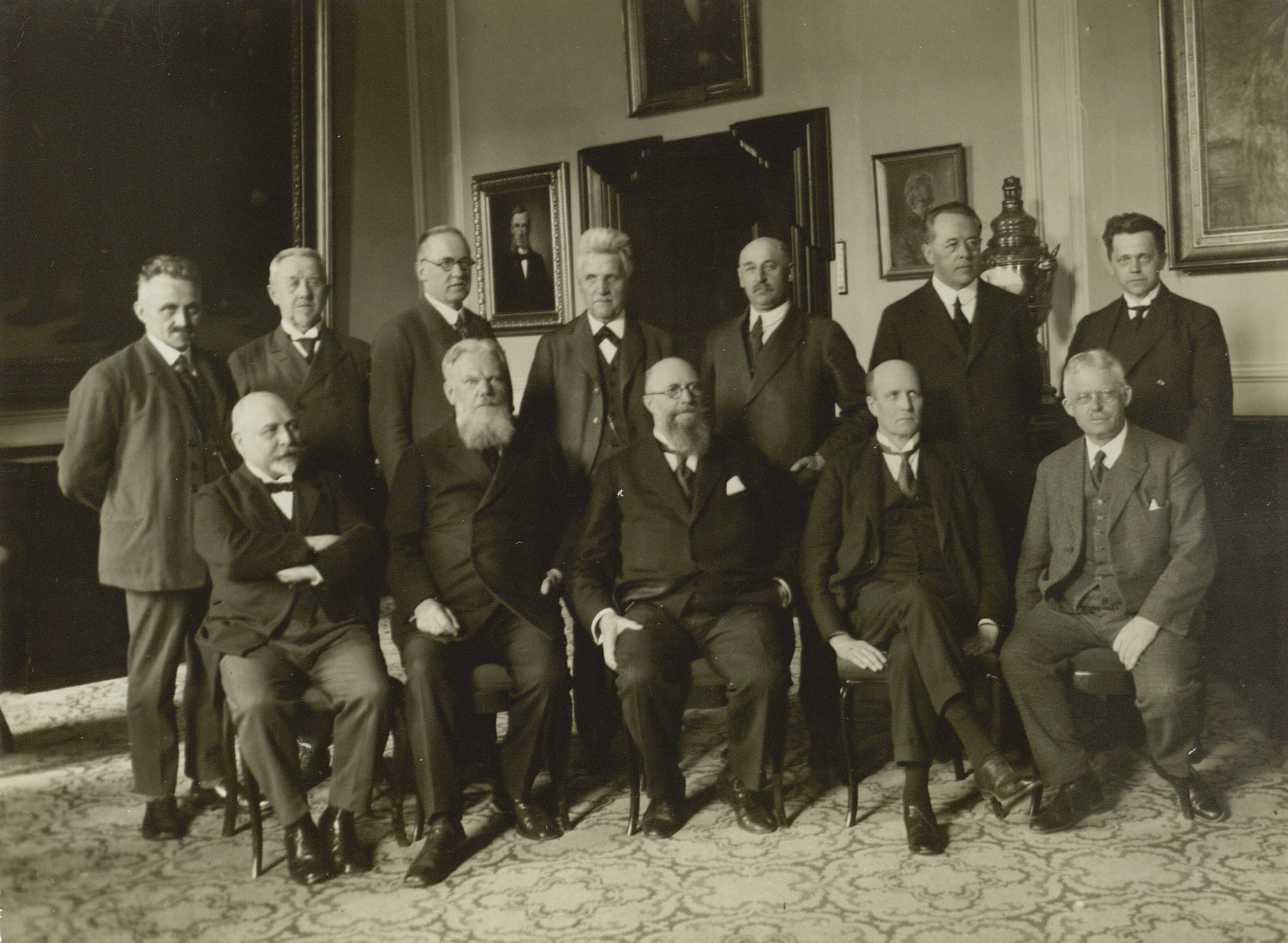
- Members of the cabinet
- Date formed: 30 April 1929
- Date dissolved: 4 November 1935

People and organisations
- Monarch: Christian X
- Prime Minister: Thorvald Stauning
- Total no. of members: 13
- Member parties: Social Democrats; Social Liberals
- Status in legislature: Coalition government

History
- Elections: 1929; 1932
- Outgoing election: 1935
- Predecessor: Madsen-Mygdal
- Successor: Stauning III

The Second cabinet of Thorvald Stauning was the government of Denmark from 30 April 1929 to 4 November 1935. It replaced the cabinet of Thomas Madsen-Mygdal, and was replaced by the third cabinet of Thorvald Stauning. This was the first coalition government in Danish history, consisting of the Social Democrats and the Social Liberal Party.

== List of ministers ==
Cabinet members
Portfolio	Minister	Took office	Left office	Party	Ref
Prime Minister	Thorvald Stauning	30 April 1929	4 November 1935	Social Democrats	
Minister of Foreign Affairs	Peter Rochegune Munch	30 April 1929	4 November 1935	Social Liberals	
Minister of Finance	Carl Valdemar Bramsnæs	30 April 1929	31 May 1933	Social Democrats	
Minister of Finance	Hans Peter Hansen	31 May 1933	4 November 1935	Social Democrats	
Minister of Defence	Laust Rasmussen	30 April 1929	24 November 1932	Social Democrats	
Minister of Defence	Hans Peter Hansen	24 November 1932	31 May 1933	Social Democrats	
Minister of Defence	Thorvald Stauning	31 May 1933	4 November 1935	Social Democrats	
Minister of Ecclesiastical Affairs	Peter Dahl	30 April 1929	4 November 1935	Social Democrats	
Minister of Education	Frederik Borgbjerg	30 April 1929	4 November 1935	Social Democrats	
Minister of Justice	Carl Theodor Zahle	30 April 1929	4 November 1935	Social Liberals	
Minister of the Interior	Bertel Dahlgaard	30 April 1929	4 November 1935	Social Liberals	
Minister of Public Works	Johannes Friis-Skotte	30 April 1929	4 November 1935	Social Democrats	
Minister of Agriculture	Kristen Bording	30 April 1929	4 November 1935	Social Democrats	
Minister of Industry and Trade	Christen Nielsen Hauge	30 April 1929	4 November 1935	Social Democrats	
Minister of Seafaring and Fisheries	Thorvald Stauning	30 April 1929	31 May 1933	Social Democrats	
Minister of Seafaring and Fisheries	Christen Nielsen Hauge (act.)	31 May 1933	4 November 1935	Social Democrats	
Ministry of Social Affairs	Karl Kristian Steincke	30 April 1929	4 November 1935	Social Democrats	

Preceded by Madsen-Mygdal	Cabinet of Denmark; 1929-1935	Succeeded by Stauning III
