= Gunnar Larsen =

Gunnar Larsen may refer to:

- Gunnar Larsen (politician) (1902–1973), Danish chemical engineer, businessman and politician
- Gunnar Larsen (writer) (1900–1958), Norwegian journalist, writer, and translator
- Gunnar Alf Larsen (1919–2003), Norwegian politician
