= Karl Kristian Steincke =

Danish politician

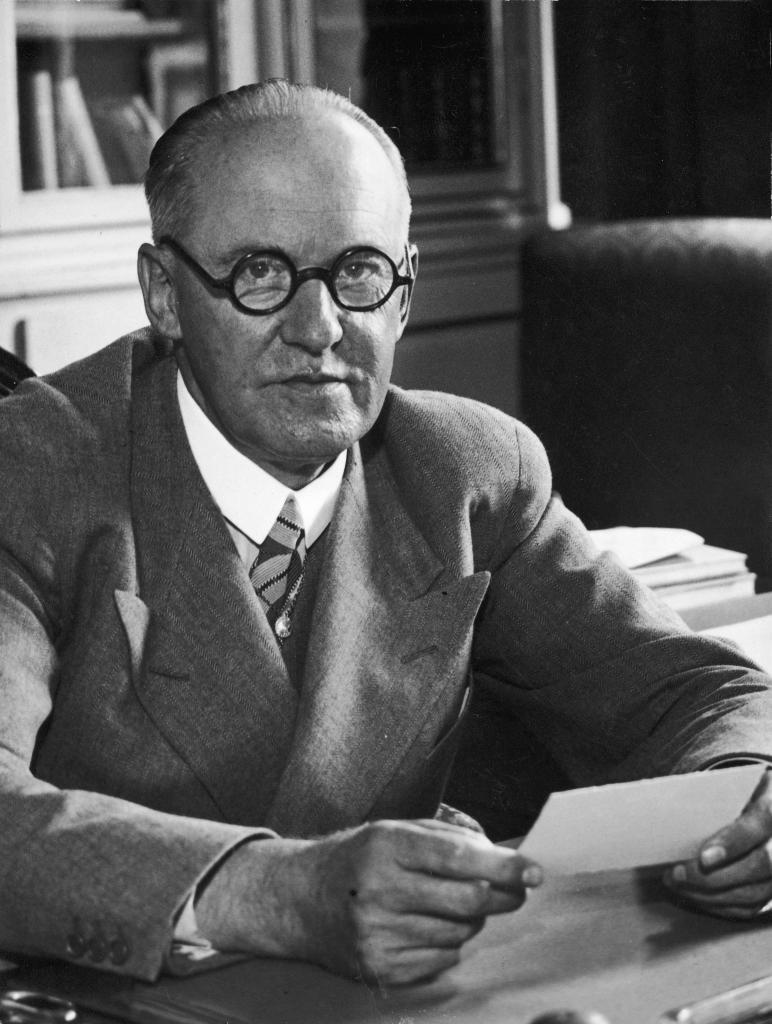
Karl Kristian Steincke, circa 1940.

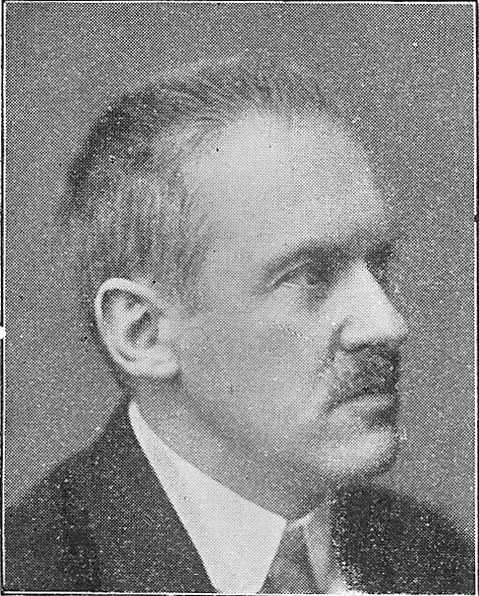
Karl Kristian Steincke in 1921.

Karl Kristian Vilhelm Steincke (25 August 1880 – 8 August 1963), was a Danish politician from the Social Democratic Party. He was the justice minister of Denmark from 1924 to 1926 in the Stauning I Cabinet, social minister from 1929 to 1935 in the Stauning II Cabinet, and justice minister again from 1935 to 1939 in the Stauning III Cabinet and in 1950 in the Hedtoft I and II Cabinets. He has been cited as the chief architect of the Danish welfare state with the Social Reform Acts of the early 1930s, including the Kanslergade Agreement.

== Eugenics ==
Steincke is especially known for his book The Future's Social Welfare (Danish: Fremtidens forsørgelsesvæsen) from 1920 in which he foretells:

"We treat the inferior individual with all care and love, but forbid him, in return, only to reproduce himself."

His book was the basis of the Danish laws about Eugenics, the sterilization and castration of unwanted elements. Steincke regarded the prevention of "inferior individuals" reproducing as important for society, as for the children of the "inferior individuals".

== Notes ==
Political offices
Preceded by Svenning Rytter	Justice Minister of Denmark; 23 April 1924 – 14 December 1926	Succeeded by Svenning Rytter
Preceded by —	Social Minister of Denmark; 30 April 1929 – 4 November 1935	Succeeded by Ludvig Christensen
Preceded by Carl Theodor Zahle	Justice Minister of Denmark; 4 November 1935 – 15 September 1939	Succeeded by Svend Unmack Larsen
Preceded by Charles Petersen	Speaker of the Landsting; 7 January 1948 – 15 March 1950	Succeeded by Ingeborg Hansen
Preceded by Vilhelm Buhl	Justice Minister of Denmark; 4 March 1950 – 30 October 1950	Succeeded by Helga Pedersen
Preceded by Ingeborg Hansen	Speaker of the Landsting; 1951 – 1952	Succeeded by Ingeborg Hansen
