= Stauning Vestjylland Airport =

Stauning Vestjylland Airport Vestjyllands Lufthavn
- IATA: STA; ICAO: EKVJ

Summary
- Location: Stauning
- Elevation AMSL: 17 ft / 5 m
- Coordinates: 55.9901°N 8.354752°E
- Website: https://stauning-lufthavn.dk/
- Interactive map of Stauning Vestjylland Airport

Runways
Direction	Length		Surface
Direction	ft	m	Surface
09/27	4,757	1,450	Asphalt

Statistics (2007)
- Passengers: 3,708
- Aircraft movements: 16,719

Stauning Vestjylland Airport is an airport in Ringkøbing-Skjern Municipality, Denmark.

It is located 4 km northwest of Stauning, 13 km northwest of Skjern and 16 km southeast of Ringkøbing.

The airport is home to the annual KZ Rally, a vintage aircraft and aviation fair where enthusiasts and collectors can show their planes.

== Facilities ==
The airport has 1 check-in desk, 140 parking spaces (40 short term, 100 long term), a Bureau de Change, Travel agent, Car rental and there is a taxi rank at the airport.
