= Ingeborg Hansen =

Danish politician

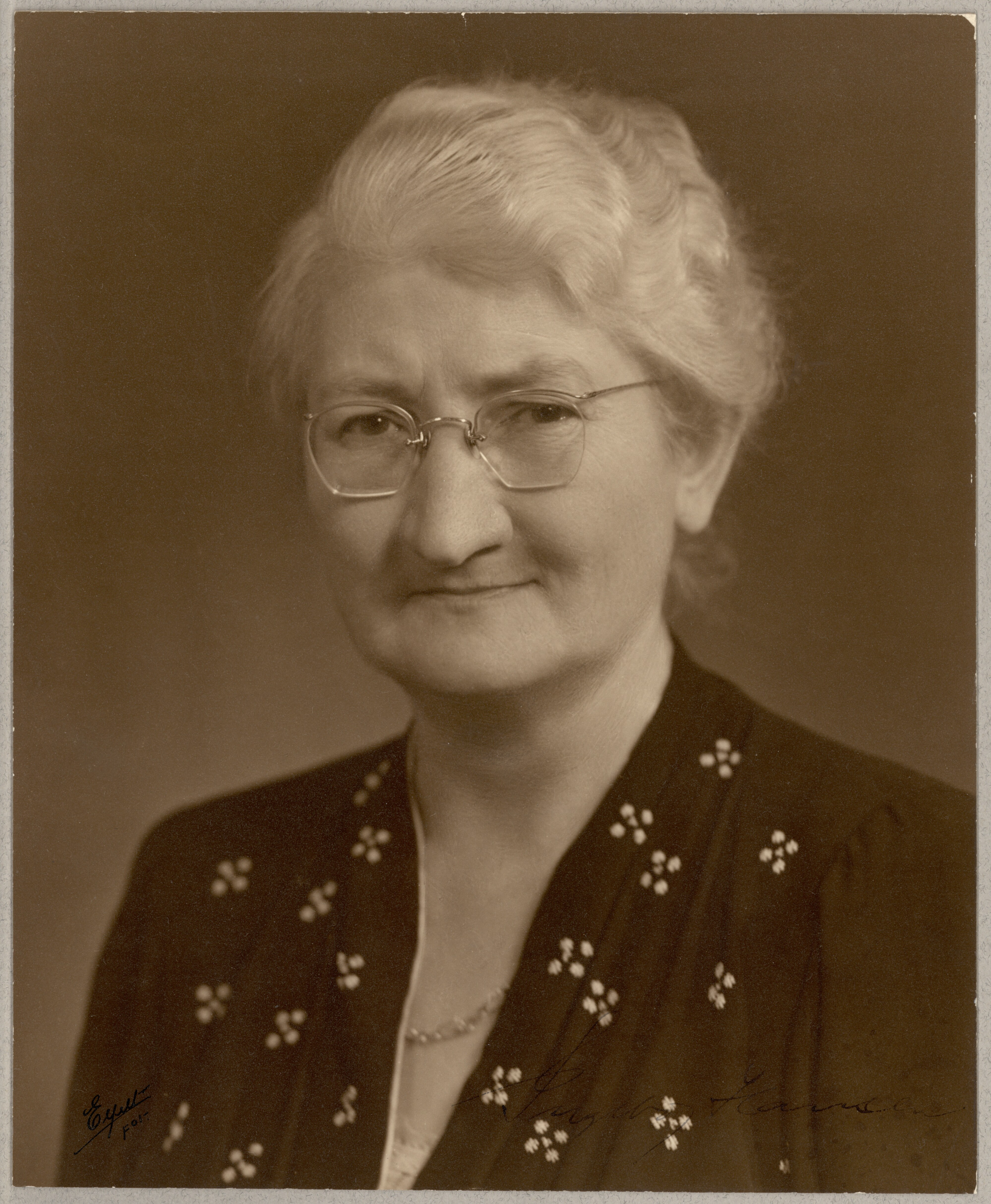
Ingeborg Hansen

Ingeborg Cathrine Hansen (17 February 1886 – 5 August 1954) was a Danish lawyer and politician of the Social Democratic Party. Elected speaker of the Landsting in 1950, she was the first female speaker in Denmark when its Parliament was bicameral.

Hansen was born in Copenhagen. She was a member of the Landsting (the upper chamber of Parliament) from 1936. When K.K. Steincke was appointed minister of justice in 1950, she was elected speaker of the Landsting. In 1951 Steincke returned as speaker, but when he exited the Landsting again in 1952, she was again elected speaker. As such she was the last speaker of the Landsting until its abolition with the constitution of 1953.

Ingeborg Hansen, as the only member in both chambers of Parliament, voted against the reinstitution of the death penalty with retroactive force in the Danish purge after World War II. She died in Vedbæk, aged 68.
