= Helga Pedersen (Denmark) =

Danish chief justice

Inger Helga Pedersen
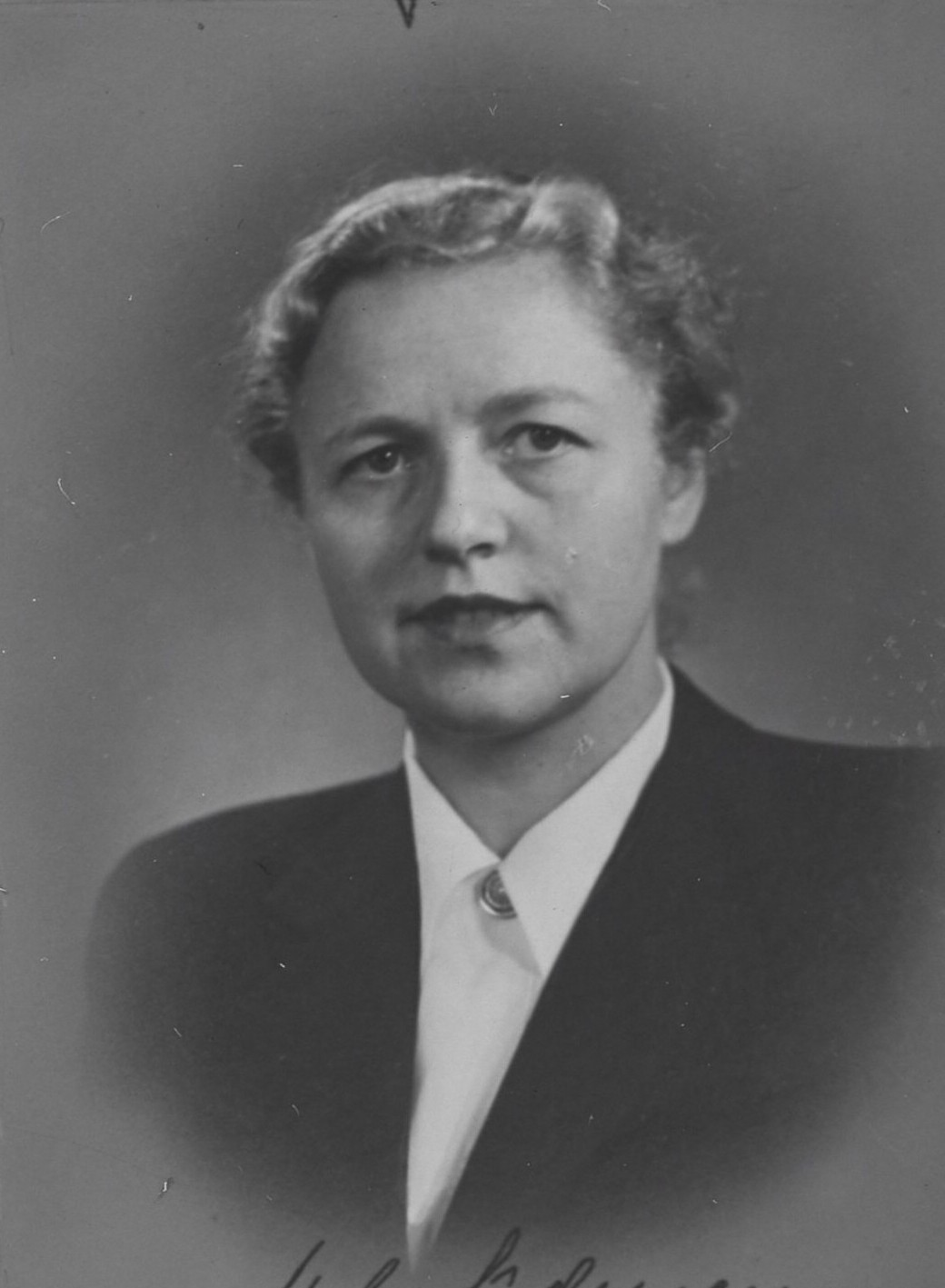
- Born: 24 June 1911; Taarnborg, Denmark
- Died: 27 January 1980 (aged 68); Korsør, Denmark
- Education: University of Copenhagen; Columbia University
- Occupations: Chief Justice, politician
- Parents: Jens Peder Nicolaj Pedersen (father); Vilhelmine Sofie Kolding (mother)

Inger Helga Pedersen (24 June 1911 – 27 January 1980) was a Danish Chief Justice and politician. She served as Justice Minister of Denmark from 1950 to 1953 and was a member of the liberal party, Venstre.

== Biography ==
Pedersen was born on her parents' farm as one of 6 siblings in Tårnborg, Denmark to Jens Peder Nicolaj Pedersen (1877–1955) and Vilhelmine Sofie Kolding (1884–1973). Helga never married and had no children. She became a student from Slagelse Gymnasium in 1930 and earned her MSc from the University of Copenhagen in 1936.

Beginning in 1936, she worked for the Ministry of Justice in the government of Erik Eriksen (1950–1953). She was Secretary to the Ministers of Justice KK Steincke, Svend Unmack Larsen, Harald Petersen, Eigil Thune Jacobsen, Niels Busch-Jensen and Aage Elmquist, among others, during the years of World War II and the Nazi occupation. After Denmark's liberation, Pedersen attended Columbia University in New York, which was funded by an International Study Grant from the American Association of University Women.

After returning to Denmark, Pedersen became the Copenhagen District Court judge from 1947 to 1950. In 1949–1950, she was named chairman of the Danish Women's National Council. In 1950, she participated in United Nations Commission on the Status of Women and until 1974, she was also a delegate at the UNESCO General Assembly, from 1962 as chair of the Danish delegation.

She was elected to the Parliament in 1950 and remained a member until 1964. She was appointed Minister of Justice for the government of Erik Eriksen. She was also a judge for the District Court and the Appeals Court. In 1964, she was appointed judge to the Supreme Court, only the second woman to hold that position.

She was against the death penalty.

She had a wide influence on issues in Parliament (called in Danish, Folketing).

As a member of parliament, she served as the Liberal Party's rapporteur in a number of legal cases. On the issue of an amended abortion law in 1956, she was the only one in her party to vote in favor of the proposal that Mødrehjælpen should have an increased influence on abortion permits at the expense of doctors. She was one of the few members of the Liberal Party who opposed the handing over of the Icelandic manuscripts from Copenhagen University, and was already, while sitting in the Folketing, interested in the work of protecting authors 'and artists' rights and in establishing the Statens Kunstfond [Danish Arts Foundation]. She was a member of the Copyright Council 1963-72, by the Planning Council for Higher Education 1964-73 and by the Prison Board 1968-73 and chairman of the Board of Representatives of the Statens Kunstfond 1964-73.

In 1971, Pedersen became the first female judge at the European Court of Human Rights in Strasbourg, France, a position she held until her death.

== Awards ==
- In 1951, Pedersen became the first female commander of the Order of the Dannebrog.
- In 1976, she became Commander of the 1st Degree.

Political offices
Preceded by Karl Kristian Steincke	Justice Minister of Denmark; 1950–1953	Succeeded by Hans Erling Hækkerup
