= Gunnar Larsen (politician) =

Danish engineer and politician (1902–1973)

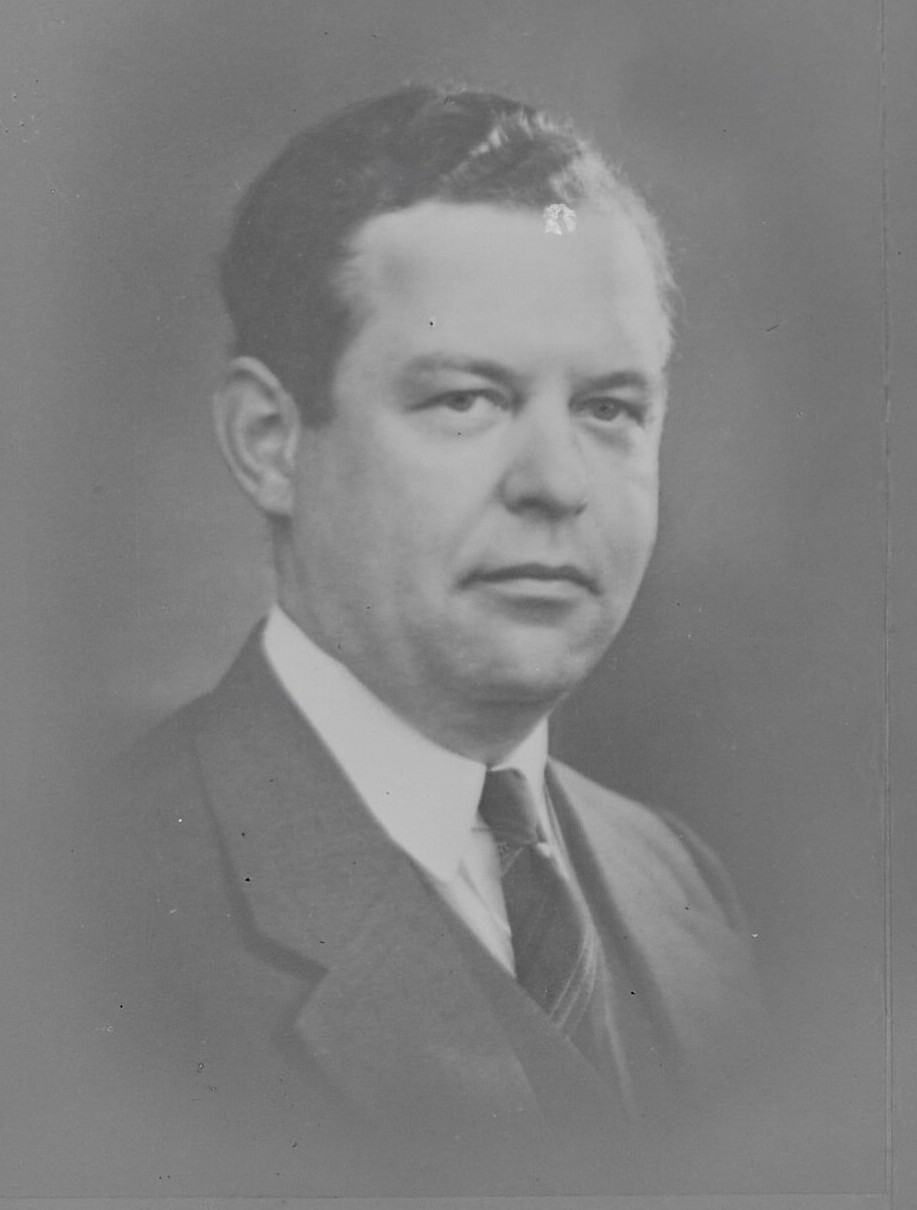
- Larsen, 1943

Minister of Public Works
- In office 8 July 1940 – 29 August 1943
- Prime Minister: Vilhelm Buhl; Thorvald Stauning
- Preceded by: Axel I. Sørensen
- Succeeded by: Carl Petersen

Personal details
- Born: 10 January 1902 Frederiksberg
- Died: 1 February 1973 (aged 71) Ireland
- Education: Massachusetts Institute of Technology
- Profession: Engineer

Gunnar Larsen (10 January 1902 – 1 February 1973) was a Danish chemical engineer, businessman and politician. He served as the minister of public works between 1940 and 1943. He left Denmark in 1954 and exiled into Ireland where he lived until his death.

== Early life and education ==
Larsen was born on 10 January 1902. He was an engineer by profession and graduated from the Massachusetts Institute of Technology obtaining a degree in chemical engineering in 1926.

== Career and activities ==
He was named as the director of FL Smidth & Co. in 1935 becoming a prominent figure in the Danish industry. Larsen replaced his father as the director of the company. Larsen was one of the confidantes of Danish politician Erik Scavenius. He resigned from the company on 8 July 1940 when he was appointed minister of public works. He was part of the coalition government and the first Buhl cabinet which ceased to function on 29 August 1943. He served in the cabinets as an independent politician.

Following the end of his tenure as minister he developed an alliance with the British intelligence service and supported the resistance movement financially. After World War II Larsen was arrested in 1945 and the Copenhagen City Court sentenced him to prison for providing financial support to a gun brush factory. He was acquitted by the High Court and the Supreme Court in 1948. Because it was concluded that the reasons for his financial support was not economical, but political.

== Exile and death ==
Larsen left Denmark and settled in Ireland in 1954. He became a citizen of Ireland and involved in business. He died in Ireland on 1 February 1973.

=== Legacy ===
Larsen's diaries covering the period between January 1941 and September 1943 were published in 2011.
