= Minister of Public Works (Denmark) =

Former Danish political office

- Minister for offentlige arbejder
- State coat of arms of the Kingdom of Denmark

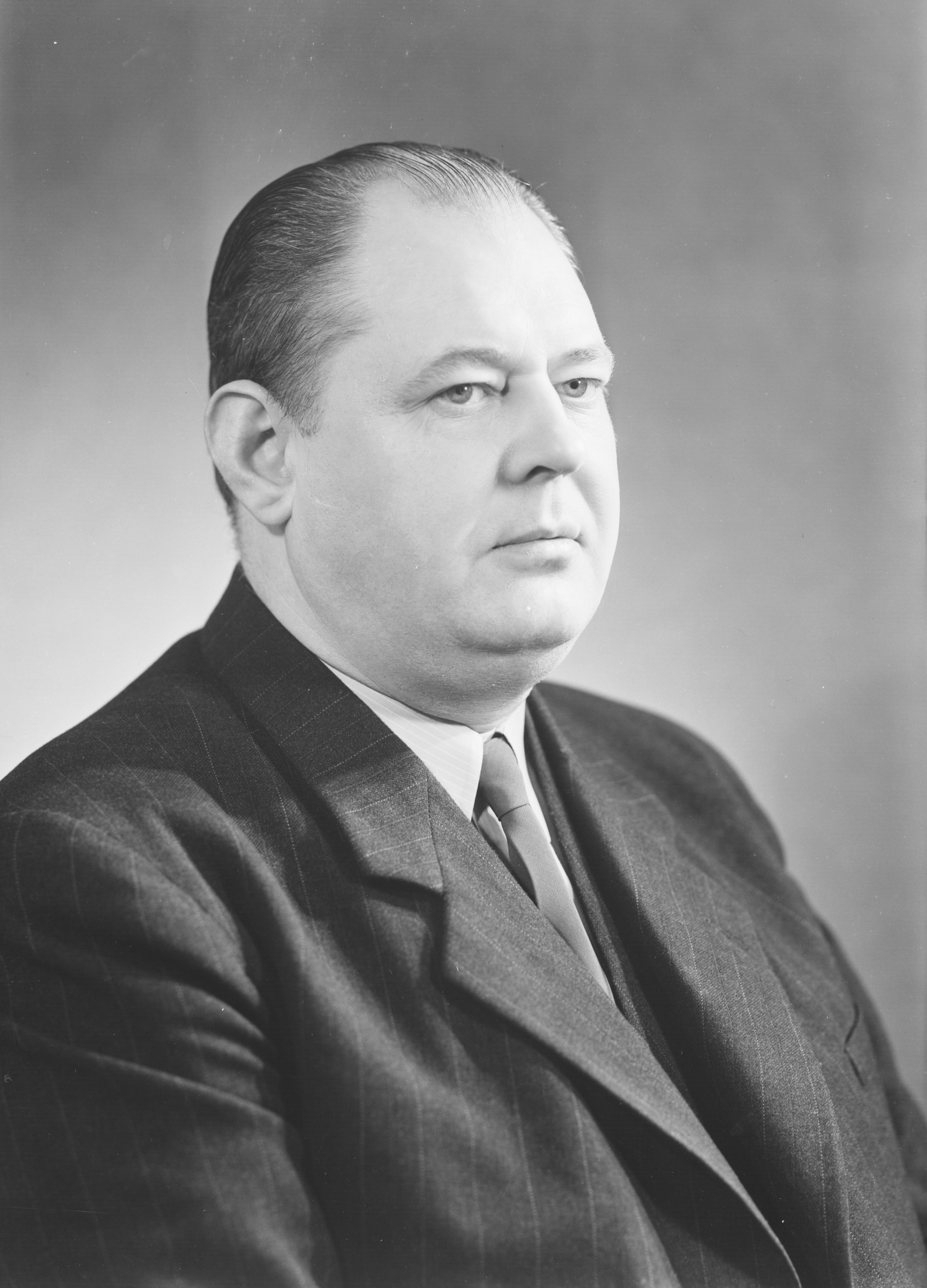
- Longest serving Kai Lindberg; 1 September 1955–28 November 1966
- Ministry of Transport
- Type: Minister
- Member of: Cabinet; State Council
- Reports to: the Prime minister
- Seat: Slotsholmen
- Appointer: The Monarch (on the advice of the Prime Minister)
- Formation: 15 January 1894; 132 years ago
- First holder: Hans Peter Ingerslev
- Final holder: Arne Melchior
- Abolished: 14 August 1986; 40 years ago
- Superseded by: Minister of Transport
- Succession: depending on the order in the State Council
- Deputy: Permanent Secretary

The Minister of Public Works (Danish: Minister for offentlige arbejder) was the Danish minister responsible for the Ministry of Public Works. The position was created in 1894, following a split from the Minister of the Interior. In 1987, the position was abolished and the roles were transferred to the Minister of Transport.

== List of ministers ==
No.	Portrait	Name (born-died)	Term of office			Political party	Government	Ref.
No.	Portrait	Name (born-died)	Took office	Left office	Time in office	Political party	Government	Ref.
Minister for Public Works (Minister for offentlige arbejder)
1		Hans Peter Ingerslev (1831–1896)	15 January 1894	20 April 1896 #	2 years, 96 days	Højre	Estrup; Reedtz-Thott	
2		Hugo Egmont Hørring (1842–1909)	20 April 1896	23 May 1897	1 year, 33 days	Højre	Reedtz-Thott	
3		Christian Juul-Rysensteen (1838–1907)	24 April 1900	24 July 1901	1 year, 88 days	Højre	Sehested	
4		Viggo Hørup (1841–1902)	24 July 1901	15 February 1902 #	206 days	Venstre Reform Party	Deuntzer	
5		Christopher Hage (1848–1930)	15 February 1902	14 January 1905	2 years, 334 days	Venstre Reform Party	Deuntzer	
6		Svend Høgsbro (1855–1910)	14 January 1905	24 July 1908	3 years, 192 days	Venstre	Christensen I	
7		Jens Jensen-Sønderup (1862–1949)	24 July 1908	16 August 1909	1 year, 23 days	Venstre	Christensen II; Neergaard I	
8		Thomas C. Larsen (1854–1944)	16 August 1909	28 October 1909	73 days	Venstre	Holstein-Ledreborg	
9		Jens Jørgen Jensen-Onsted (1860–1933)	28 October 1909	2 February 1910	97 days	Danish Social Liberal Party	Zahle I	
10		Wilhelm Weimann (1868–1942)	2 February 1910	5 July 1910	153 days	Venstre	Zahle I	
(8)		Thomas C. Larsen (1854–1944)	5 July 1910	21 June 1913	2 years, 351 days	Venstre	Berntsen	
11		Jens Hassing-Jørgensen (1872–1952)	21 June 1913	29 March 1920	6 years, 282 days	Danish Social Liberal Party	Zahle II	
12		Niels Christensen Monberg (1856–1930)	29 March 1920	5 April 1920	7 days	Independent	Liebe	
13		Kristen Riis-Hansen (1876–1937)	5 April 1920	5 May 1920	30 days	Independent	Friis	
14		Marius Abel Nielsen Slebsager (1874–1962)	5 May 1920	23 April 1924	3 years, 354 days	Venstre	Neergaard II–III	
15		Johannes Friis-Skotte (1874–1946)	23 April 1924	14 December 1926	2 years, 235 days	Social Democrats	Stauning I	
16		Johannes Stensballe (1874–1956)	14 December 1926	30 April 1929	2 years, 137 days	Venstre	Madsen-Mygdal	
(15)		Johannes Friis-Skotte (1874–1946)	30 April 1929	4 November 1935	6 years, 188 days	Social Democrats	Stauning II	
17		Niels Peter Fisker (1886–1939)	4 November 1935	15 September 1939	3 years, 315 days	Social Democrats	Stauning III	
18		Axel I. Sørensen (1882–1947)	15 September 1939	8 July 1940	297 days	Social Democrats	Stauning IV–V	
19		Gunnar Larsen (1902–1973)	8 July 1940	29 August 1943	3 years, 46 days	Independent	Stauning VI; Buhl I Scavenius	
No Danish government (29 August 1943 (Note: On 29 August 1943, the Danish government resigned, refusing to grant further concessions to Nazi Germany. All government operations were assumed by the permanent secretaries of the individual departments, and this arrangement lasted until the Liberation of Denmark on 5 May 1945. Since King Christian X never accepted the resignation of the government, it existed de jure until a new cabinet was formed on 5 May 1945.) – 5 May 1945). Office is assumed by the permanent secretary.
20		Carl Petersen (1894–1984)	5 May 1945	7 November 1945	186 days	Social Democrats	Buhl II	
21		Niels Elgaard (1879–1963)	7 November 1945	13 November 1947	2 years, 6 days	Venstre	Kristensen	
(20)		Carl Petersen (1894–1984)	13 November 1947	17 September 1950	2 years, 308 days	Social Democrats	Hedtoft I	
22		Frede Nielsen (1891–1954)	17 September 1950	30 October 1950	43 days	Social Democrats	Hedtoft II	
23		Victor Larsen (1890–1952)	30 October 1950	25 April 1952	1 year, 178 days	Conservative People's Party	Eriksen	
24		Jørgen Jørgensen (1891–1963)	25 April 1952	30 September 1953	1 year, 158 days	Conservative People's Party	Eriksen	
(20)		Carl Petersen (1894–1984)	30 September 1953	1 September 1955	1 year, 336 days	Social Democrats	Hedtoft III; Hansen I	
25		Kai Lindberg (1899–1985)	1 September 1955	28 November 1966	11 years, 88 days	Social Democrats	Hansen I–II; Kampmann I–II; Krag I–II	
26		Svend Horn (1906–1992)	28 November 1966	2 February 1968	1 year, 66 days	Social Democrats	Krag II	
27		Ove Guldberg (1918–2008)	2 February 1968	11 October 1971	3 years, 251 days	Venstre	Baunsgaard	
28		Jens Kampmann (1937–2026)	11 October 1971	19 December 1973	2 years, 69 days	Social Democrats	Krag III; Jørgensen I	
29		Kresten Damsgaard (1903–1992)	19 December 1973	13 February 1975	1 year, 56 days	Venstre	Hartling	
30		Niels Matthiasen (1924–1980)	13 February 1975	26 February 1977	2 years, 13 days	Social Democrats	Jørgensen II	
31		Kjeld Olesen (1932–2024)	26 February 1977	30 August 1978	1 year, 185 days	Social Democrats	Jørgensen II	
32		Ivar Hansen (1938–2003)	30 August 1978	26 October 1979	1 year, 57 days	Venstre	Jørgensen III	
33		Jens Risgaard Knudsen (1925–1997)	26 October 1979	15 October 1981	1 year, 354 days	Social Democrats	Jørgensen IV	
34		Knud Heinesen (1932–2025)	15 October 1981	30 December 1981	76 days	Social Democrats	Jørgensen IV	
35		Jens Kristian Hansen (1926–2023)	30 December 1981	10 September 1982	254 days	Social Democrats	Jørgensen V	
36		Arne Melchior (1924–2016)	10 September 1982	14 August 1986	3 years, 338 days	Centre Democrats	Schlüter I	
