= Stauning I Cabinet =

Danish government from 1924 to 1926

Stauning I
- 33rd Cabinet of Denmark

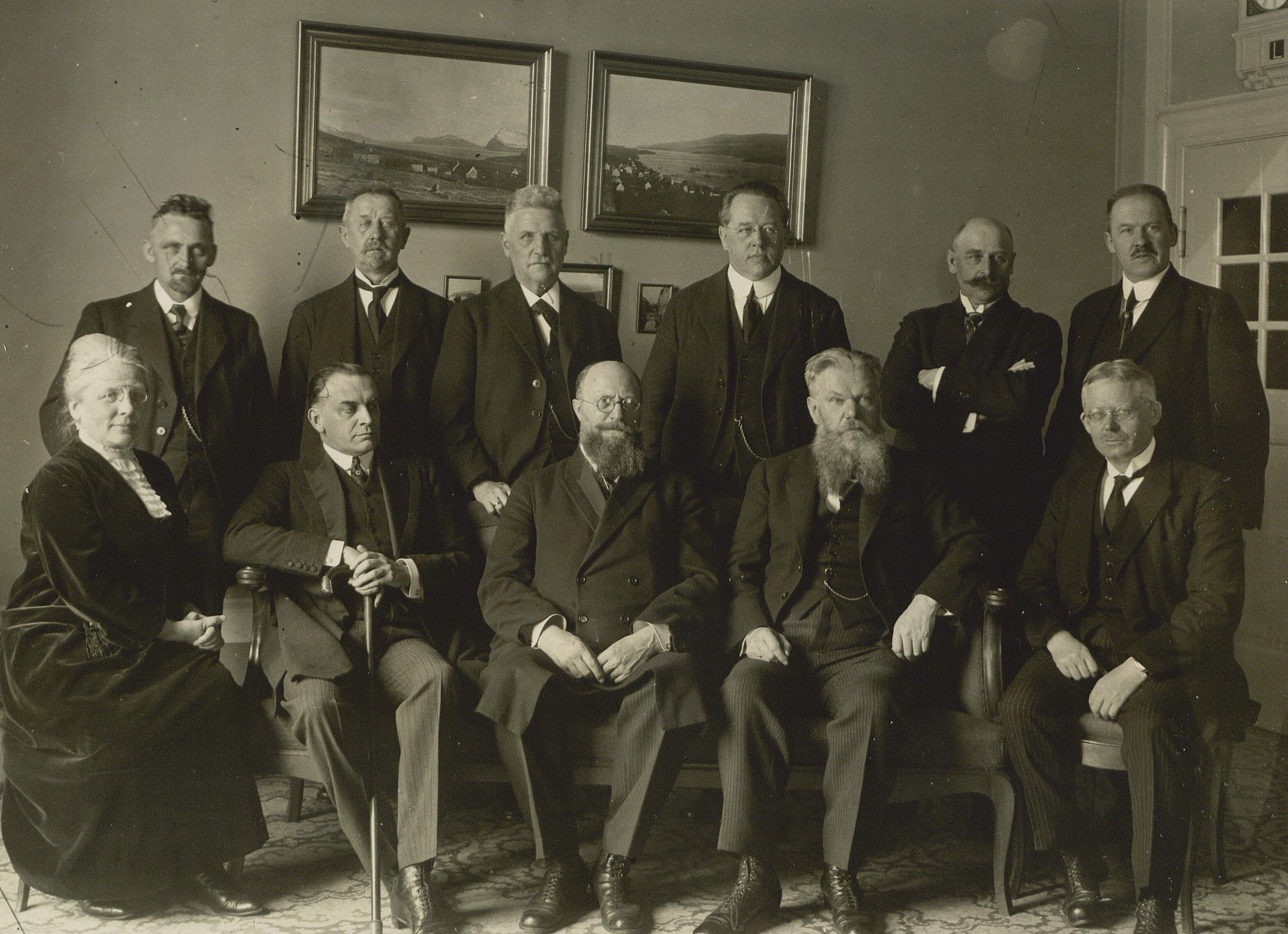
- Members of the Stauning I Cabinet
- Date formed: 23 April 1924
- Date dissolved: 14 December 1926

People and organisations
- Head of state: Christian X
- Head of government: Thorvald Stauning
- Total no. of members: 11
- Member party: Social Democrats
- Status in legislature: Single-party minority

History
- Election: 1924
- Outgoing election: 1926
- Predecessor: Neergaard III
- Successor: Madsen-Mygdal

The First Cabinet of Stauning was the government of Denmark from 23 April 1924, to 14 December 1926. It was the first Social Democrats government on Denmark.

== List of ministers ==
The cabinet consisted of:

Cabinet members
Portfolio	Minister	Took office	Left office	Party
Prime Minister & Minister of Industry and Seafaring	Thorvald Stauning	23 April 1924	14 December 1926	Social Democrats
Minister of Foreign Affairs	Carl Moltke	23 April 1924	14 December 1926	Independent
Minister for Finance	Carl Valdemar Bramsnæs	23 April 1924	14 December 1926	Social Democrats
Minister of Defence	Laust Rasmussen	23 April 1924	14 December 1926	Social Democrats
Minister for Ecclesiastical Affairs	Peter Lorentsen Dahl	23 April 1924	14 December 1926	Social Democrats
Minister for Education	Nina Bang	23 April 1924	14 December 1926	Social Democrats
Minister of Justice	Karl Kristian Steincke	23 April 1924	14 December 1926	Social Democrats
Minister of the Interior	Christen Nielsen Hauge	23 April 1924	14 December 1926	Social Democrats
Minister of Public Works	Johannes Friis-Skotte	23 April 1924	14 December 1926	Social Democrats
Minister for Agriculture	Kristen Bording	23 April 1924	14 December 1926	Social Democrats
Ministry of Social Affairs	Frederik Borgbjerg	23 April 1924	14 December 1926	Social Democrats

Preceded by Neergaard III	Cabinet of Denmark; 1924-1926	Succeeded by Madsen-Mygdal
