= Stauning III Cabinet =

Danish government from 1935 to 1939

Third Stauning Cabinet
- 36th Cabinet of Denmark

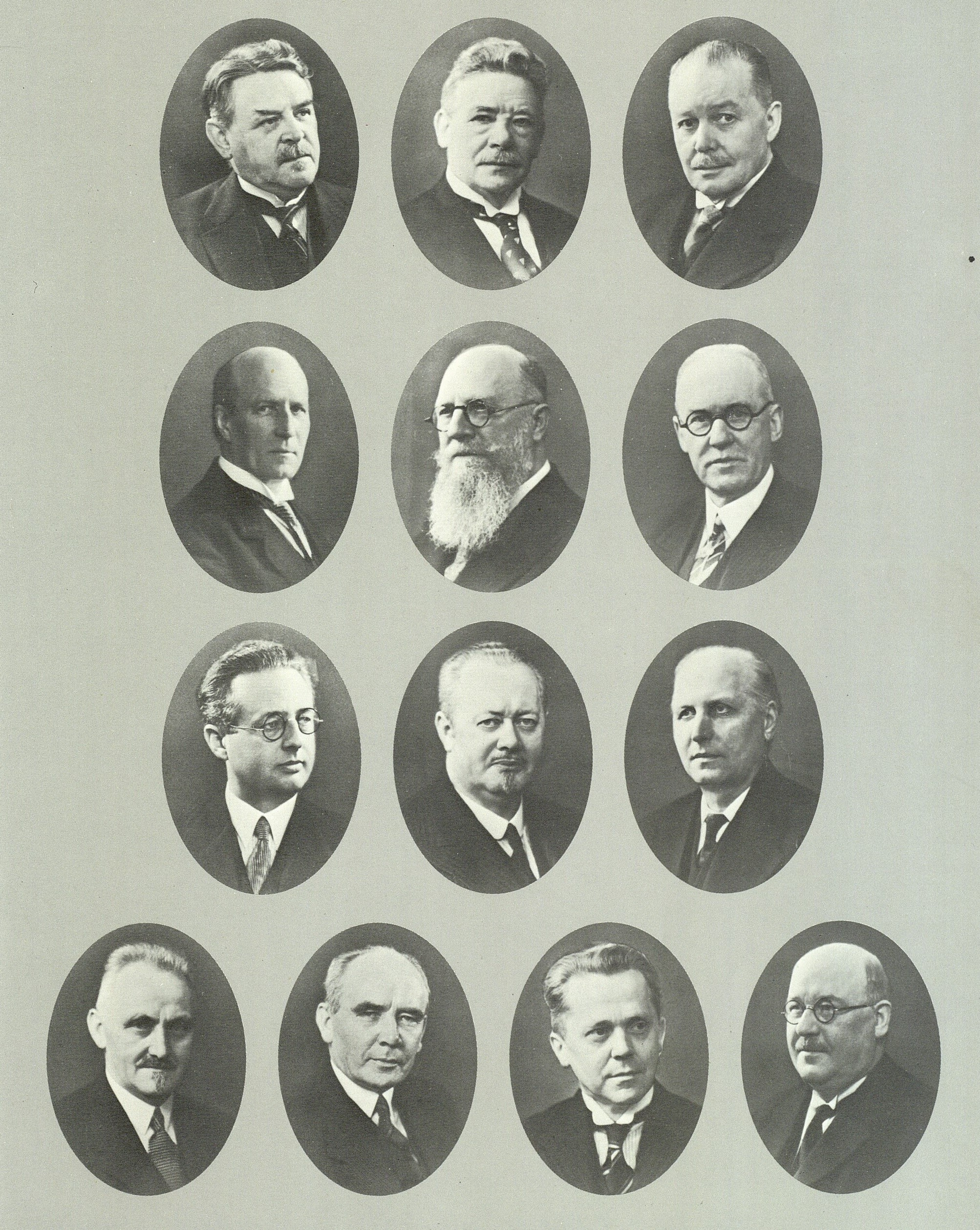
- Members of the Third Stauning Cabinet
- Date formed: 4 November 1935
- Date dissolved: 15 September 1939

People and organisations
- Head of state: Christian X
- Head of government: Thorvald Stauning
- No. of ministers: 12
- Total no. of members: 13
- Member party: Social Democrats; Social Liberals
- Status in legislature: Coalition

History
- Election: 1935
- Outgoing election: 1939
- Legislature term: 1935–1939
- Predecessor: Stauning II
- Successor: Stauning IV

The Third Cabinet of Stauning was the government of Denmark from 4 November 1935 to 15 September 1939. It replaced the Second Stauning Cabinet, and was replaced by the Fourth Stauning Cabinet.

== List of ministers ==
The cabinet consisted of these ministers, with some continuing into the Fourth Stauning Cabinet:

Cabinet members
Portfolio	Minister	Took office	Left office	Party
Prime Minister	Thorvald Stauning	30 April 1929	3 May 1942	Social Democrats
Minister of Foreign Affairs	Peter Rochegune Munch	30 April 1929	8 July 1940	Social Liberals
Minister for Finance	Hans Peter Hansen	31 May 1933	20 July 1937	Social Democrats
Minister for Finance	Vilhelm Buhl	20 July 1937	16 July 1942	Social Democrats
Minister of Defence	Alsing Andersen	4 November 1935	10 April 1940	Social Democrats
Minister for Ecclesiastical Affairs	Johannes Hansen	4 November 1935	8 July 1940	Social Democrats
Minister for Education	Jørgen Jørgensen	4 November 1935	9 November 1942	Social Liberals
Minister of Justice	Karl Kristian Steincke	4 November 1935	15 September 1939	Social Democrats
Minister of the Interior	Bertel Dahlgaard	30 April 1929	8 July 1940	Social Liberals
Minister of Public Works	Niels Peter Fisker	4 November 1935	15 September 1939	Social Democrats
Minister for Agriculture (Minister for Agriculture and Fisheries from 9 November 1935)	Kristen Bording	30 April 1929	29 August 1943	Social Democrats
Minister for Industry, Trade and Seafaring	Johannes Kjærbøl	4 November 1935	8 July 1940	Social Democrats
Ministry of Social Affairs	Ludvig Christensen	5 November 1935	8 July 1940	Social Democrats

Preceded by Stauning II	Cabinet of Denmark; 1935-1939	Succeeded by Stauning IV
