= Stauning or Chaos =

Renowned 1935 Danish election poster

Stauning eller Kaos
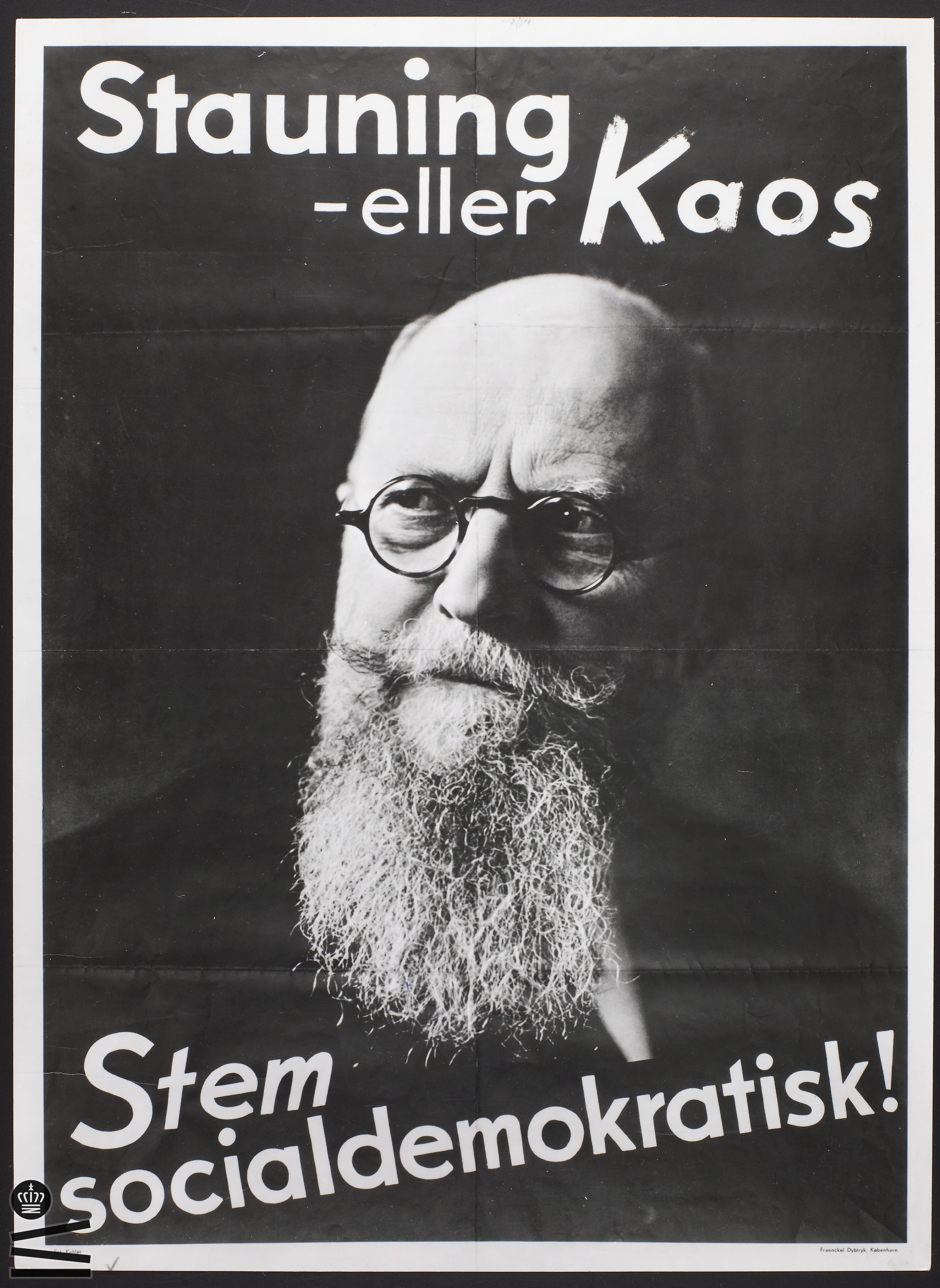
- "Stauning or Chaos – Vote Social Democrat!"
- Artist: Reimert Kehlet
- Year: 1935
- Medium: Photograph
- Subject: Thorvald Stauning

Stauning or Chaos (Danish: Stauning eller Kaos) is a famous Danish poster and slogan from the parliamentary election of 1935, in which Social Democrat Thorvald Stauning campaigned for re-election. The Social Democrats won the election getting 68 out of 149 seats, and Stauning went on to become the second-longest serving Prime Minister in Danish history.

The campaign with its warning against "chaos", interpreted as the threat of fascism, is an example of the emotional and activist campaign style used by the major political parties in Denmark in the 1920s and 1930s, often capitalizing on the public fear of the perceived threats of radical ideologies such as fascism and communism.
