= Stauning, Ringkøbing-Skjern =

Stauning
- Village
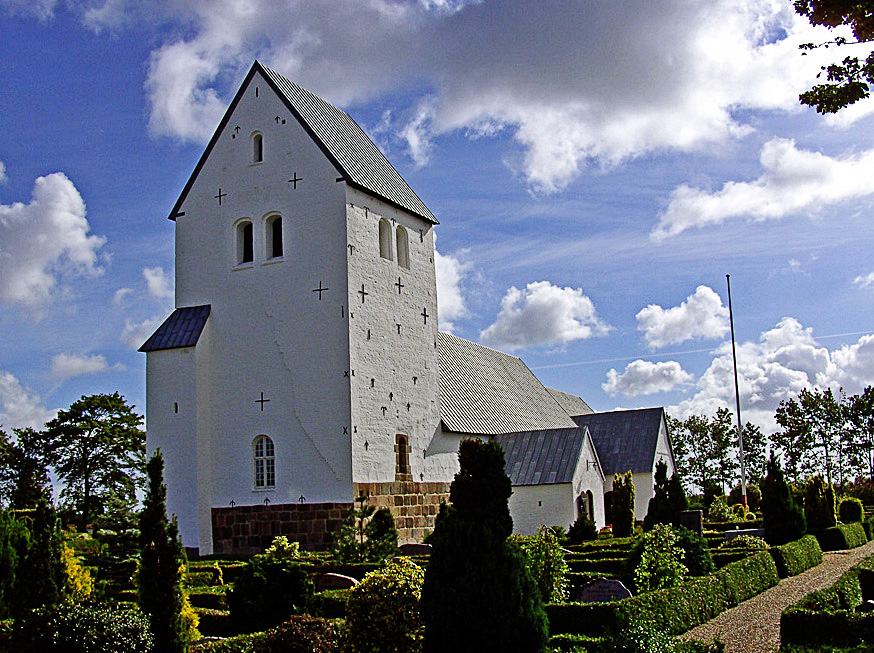
- Stauning Church

- Location in Central Denmark Region Stauning (Denmark)
- Coordinates: 55°57′55″N 8°22′14″E
- Country: Denmark
- Region: Central Denmark
- Municipality: Ringkøbing-Skjern

Population (2026)
  - Total: 324

Stauning is a village with a population of 324 (1 January 2026). It is situated in Western Jutland, Denmark, at the eastern shore of Ringkøbing Fjord, 8 km west of the town of Skjern.

Stauning Church is located in the village.

The whisky distillery Stauning Whisky is located just southeast of the village.

Stauning Vestjylland Airport is located 4 km northwest of Stauning.
