= Henry Stanning =

English cricketer

Henry Duncan Stanning (14 November 1881 – 5 March 1946) was an English cricketer active from 1906 to 1908 who played for Lancashire. He was born in Leyland, Lancashire, and died in Kampi-Ya-Moto, Kenya. He appeared in 33 first-class matches as a righthanded batsman, scoring 898 runs with a highest score of 86 and held ten catches. He was the brother of John Stanning senior and the uncle of John Stanning junior. He was educated at Rugby School and Trinity College, Cambridge. He became a farmer in Kenya and during the First World War acted as an interpreter for the Gold Coast Regiment.
