= Thorvald Stauning =

Prime Minister of Denmark (1873–1942)

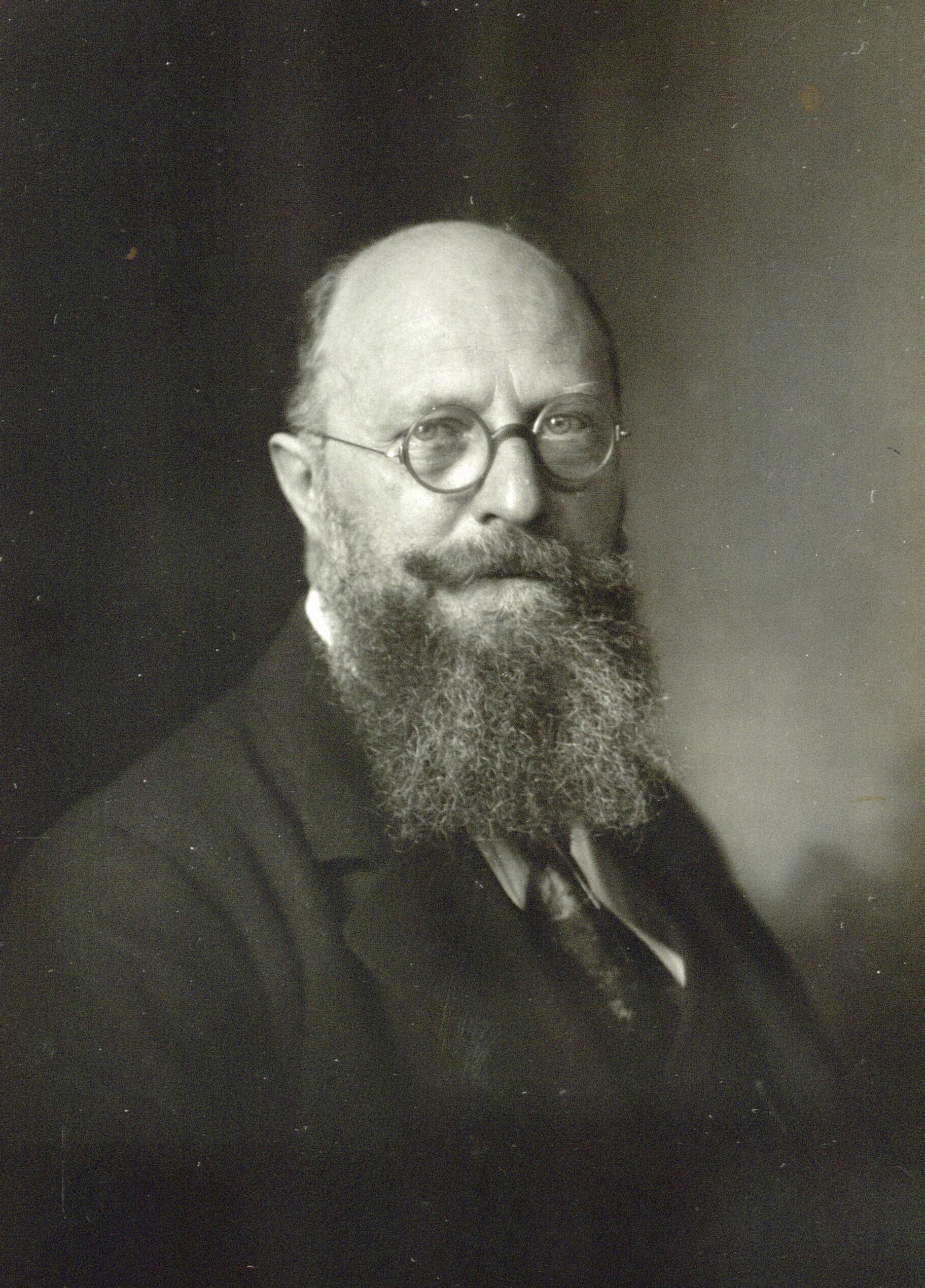
- Stauning in 1927

Prime Minister of Denmark
- In office 24 April 1924 – 14 December 1926
- Monarch: Christian X
- Preceded by: Niels Neergaard
- Succeeded by: Thomas Madsen-Mygdal
- In office 30 April 1929 – 3 May 1942
- Monarch: Christian X
- Preceded by: Thomas Madsen-Mygdal
- Succeeded by: Vilhelm Buhl

Minister of Defence
- In office 31 May 1933 – 4 November 1935
- Prime Minister: Himself
- Preceded by: Hans Peter Hansen
- Succeeded by: Alsing Andersen

Personal details
- Born: 26 October 1873 Copenhagen, Denmark
- Died: 3 May 1942 (aged 68) Copenhagen, Denmark
- Resting place: Vestre Cemetery
- Party: Social Democrats

Thorvald August Marinus Stauning (Danish: [ˈtsʰɒːˌvælˀ ˈstɑwne̝ŋ]; 26 October 1873 – 3 May 1942) was the first social democratic prime minister of Denmark. He served as prime minister from 1924 to 1926 and again from 1929 until his death in 1942.

Under Stauning's leadership, Denmark developed a social welfare state with the passage of the 1933 Social Reform Act which, according to one study, “codified, simplified and extended previous social insurance and assistance legislation.”

The Stauning Alps, a large mountain range in Greenland, were named after him.

== Political career ==
=== Member of the Folketing ===
Stauning was trained as a cigar sorter and soon became involved with trade union activity. From 1896 to 1908 he was leader of the Cigar Sorters' Union (part of the Danish Tobacco Workers' Union, in 1898 – 1904 also editor of the magazine Samarbejdet (Co-operation) of the Federation of Trade Unions, and elected Member of Parliament (Folketinget) in 1906. In 1910 he was elected chairman of the Social Democratic Party (Socialdemokratiet), a position he retained for almost thirty years, until 1939. He participated as Minister without Portfolio in the Cabinet of Zahle II from 1916 to 1920.

=== Prime Minister of Denmark ===
He was elected to government as prime minister in 1924 for the minority government which would survive until 1926. His cabinet was considered ground-breaking not only as it was the first purely Social Democratic cabinet, but also because a woman, Nina Bang, was appointed Minister of Education, which attracted some international attention, as she was one of the first female ministers in the world.

From 1929 he led the successful coalition cabinet Cabinet of Thorvald Stauning II with the social liberal Det Radikale Venstre party that would steer Denmark out of the Great Depression, shaping a major political compromise that greatly improved the Danish economy, and also transformed the Social Democratic Party from a class party to a popular party. Under Stauning's leadership Denmark, like the other Western European countries, developed a social welfare state. It is often proposed that the long-lived coalition cabinet actively averted the communist and fascist movements that were sweeping much of Europe from developing a strong following in Denmark.

In January 1933, Stauning's government entered into what was then the most extensive settlement yet in Danish politics—the Kanslergade settlement (Danish: Kanslergadeforliget)—with the liberal party Venstre. The settlement, which was named after Stauning's apartment in Kanslergade in Copenhagen, included extensive agricultural subsidies and reforms of the legislation and administration in the social sector.

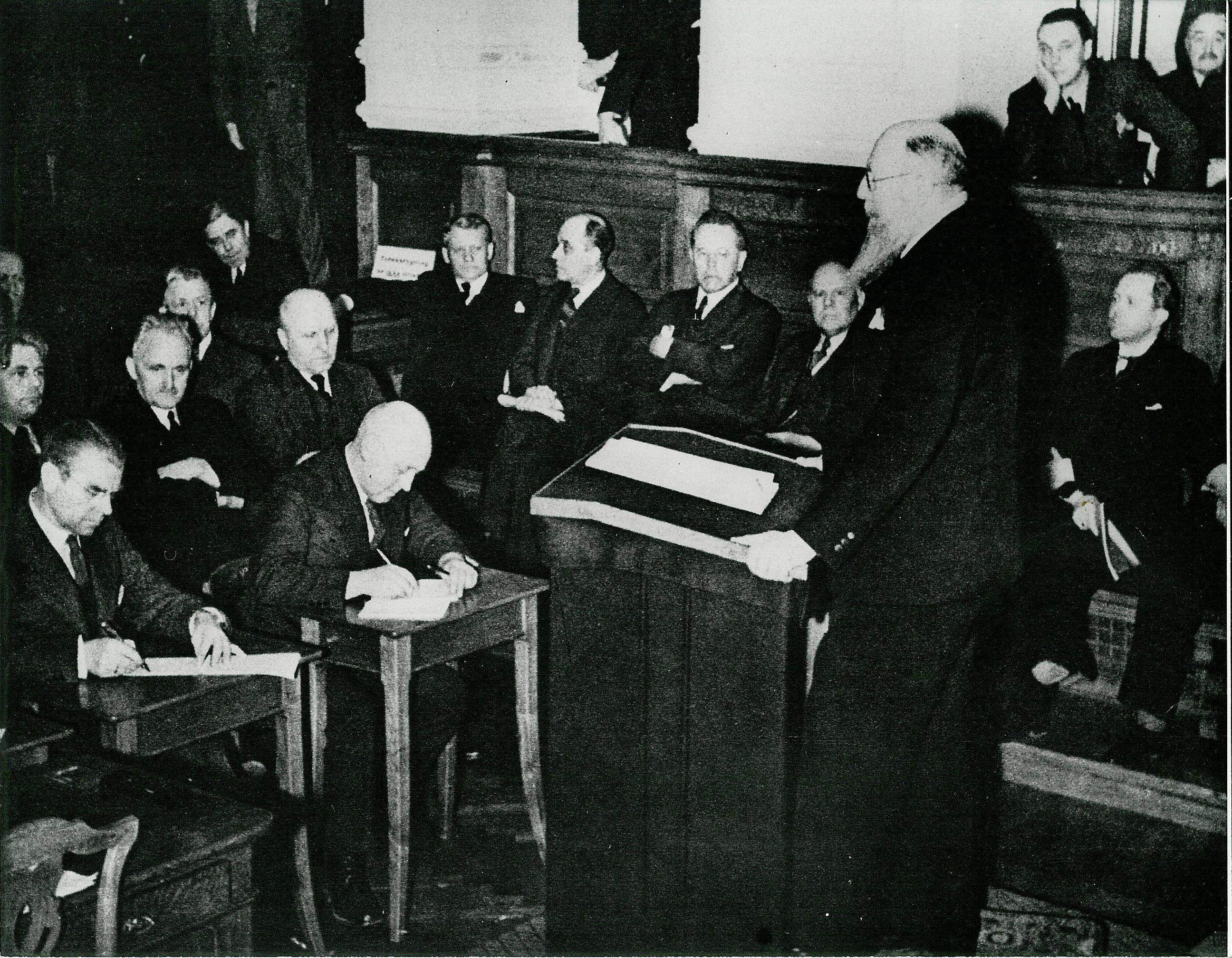
Stauning addresses the Rigsdagen in Christiansborg Palace on 9 April 1940

Stauning holds a record in Danish politics, in having successfully sought re-election no less than three times (1932, 1935 (with the famous slogan "Stauning or Chaos"), 1939). However, an attempt to amend the Constitution failed in 1939, as the turnout in the referendum was insufficient to validate the result. This came as a tremendous blow to Stauning, who seemed to lose his previously sure touch for politics thereafter. He reportedly considered resigning in the wake of the referendum failure, but was persuaded to stay on.

=== Occupation cabinet ===
Stauning's second cabinet lasted until Operation Weserübung, the Nazi occupation of Denmark, began on 9 April 1940, when the cabinet was widened to include all political parties, called the Stauning III Cabinet. Contrary to most other governments of the Nazi-invaded countries, King Christian X of Denmark and his government ordered the army and navy to stop fighting, and chose to remain in their country also under the occupation, which is believed to have contributed to the Nazi leaders being more lenient in Denmark than in other countries under Hitler's control. During the German occupation of Denmark in World War II, Prime Minister Thorvald Stauning adopted a policy of collaboration with Nazi Germany to protect Danish sovereignty and minimize the impact of the occupation. Stauning believed that cooperating with the German authorities would prevent harsher measures and maintain a semblance of Danish self-governance. His government facilitated economic collaboration, such as supplying agricultural products to Germany, while the Danish police were ordered to cooperate with the occupiers to ensure public order and security. This collaborationist stance was controversial, and Stauning's actions were seen by many as a pragmatic approach to an unavoidable situation. Despite initial intentions to protect Denmark, the Danish government's collaboration with the Nazis faced significant criticism. Resistance movements within Denmark viewed its policies as capitulation, leading to increased tensions between the government and underground groups. Over time, Stauning's health declined, and he died in 1942, leaving his successors to navigate the complex relationship with the occupying forces. The Danish government's collaboration continued under new leadership, but resistance efforts grew stronger, culminating in greater opposition to Nazi policies and significant acts of sabotage.

== Legacy ==
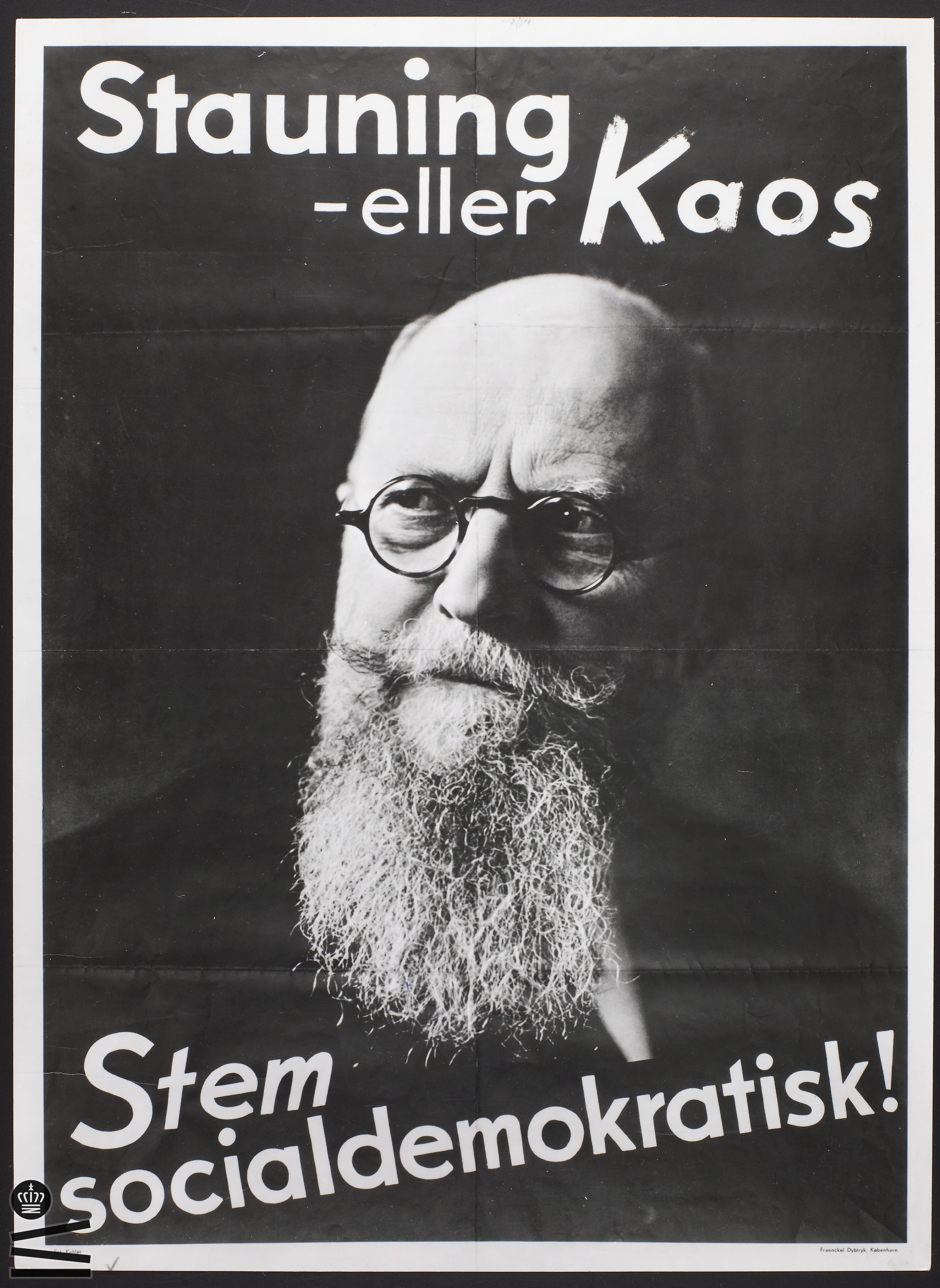
Stauning's election poster for the 1935 general election: "Stauning or Chaos – Vote Social Democrat!"

Like many other workers' leaders of his generation, such as Hjalmar Branting in Sweden, Stauning was a charismatic leader who played an important role in integrating Danish society after the social changes following the Industrial Revolution and common suffrage. His campaign slogan, "Stauning or Chaos", (Danish: Stauning eller Kaos) resonated in a nation undergoing a period of massive unemployment caused by the economic, social and political turmoil of its neighbors and trading partners, notably Denmark's chief trading partner Germany. The following Great Depression brought Danish unemployment to unprecedented heights. This period of widespread social malaise was fertile ground for leaders who could communicate a confident and coherent vision to the masses. Stauning was such a man for Denmark, and his popularity won the Social Democratic Party 46% of the total votes in the 1935 Folketing election, a figure never again reached by any Danish party.

He was given a state funeral in 1942, an honour normally not bestowed on Danish prime ministers. He is buried in Copenhagen's Vestre Cemetery. Although Denmark's relationship with Germany during World War II has been controversial, Stauning's legacy in Denmark remains positive. His popularity in the 1930s acted as a force limiting the growth of other populist parties—most importantly, the Nazi party, which remained politically insignificant. Stauning also played a major role in containing the constitutional Easter Crisis of 1920 where he brokered a deal with the king in which the monarch accepted a reduction of his own role to a merely symbolical one, avoiding any future interference in the functioning of parliamentary democracy. In return, Stauning kept the pro-republican elements of the Social Democratic Party in line and ensured his party's political support to the continuation of the Danish monarchy.

His grandson Søren Goldmann Stauning is a local politician in Them.

Political offices
Preceded by Niels Neergaard	Prime Minister of Denmark; 23 April 1924 – 14 December 1926	Succeeded by Thomas Madsen-Mygdal
Preceded by Thomas Madsen-Mygdal	Prime Minister of Denmark; 30 April 1929 – 3 May 1942	Succeeded by Vilhelm Buhl
Preceded by Hans Peter Hansen	Defence Minister of Denmark; 31 May 1933 – 4 November 1935	Succeeded by Alsing Emanuel Andersen
Party political offices
Preceded by Peter Christian Knudsen	Leader of the Danish Social Democrats; 1910 – 1939	Succeeded by Hans Hedtoft
