= Stauning Whisky =

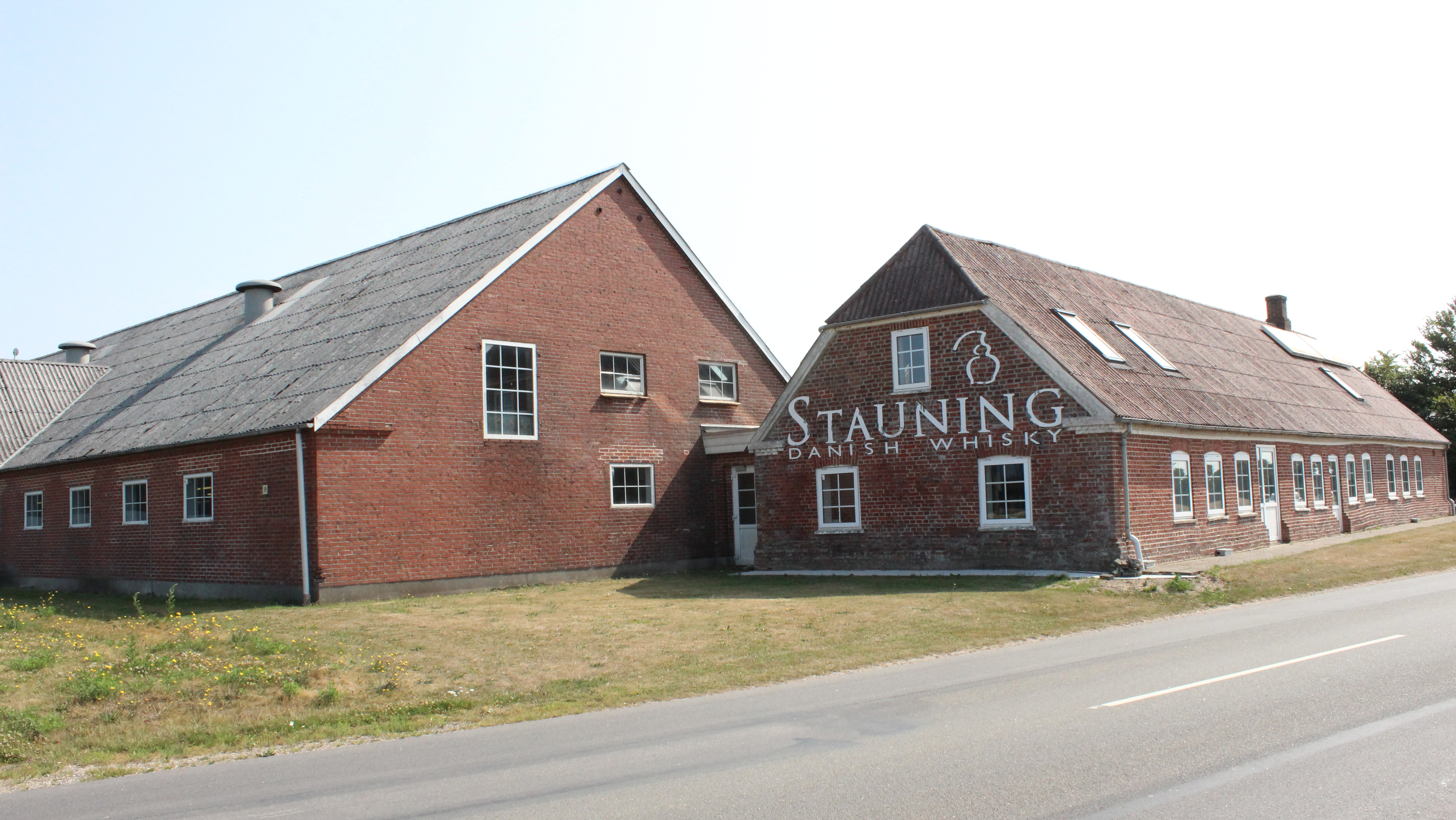

Stauning Whisky is a whisky distillery in Denmark. It is located in the western part of Jutland just south of a small village called Stauning near Skjern. The distillery was founded in May 2005 by nine Danish whisky enthusiasts and is the oldest whisky distillery in the Kingdom of Denmark. The idea was originally to create a whisky resembling the peated whisky produced on the Scottish isle of Islay. The production is done mainly by hand using local grain and water. Everything is produced following the traditional Scottish methods of whisky production. The preparations started in a building owned by one of the nine founders, formerly used as a private slaughter-house. The building was renovated and official permission obtained.

The first distillation took place in August 2006 and the following months the test production continued with ongoing improvements and streamlining of the process. In the fall of 2006 the nine owners met the whisky expert Jim Murray and presented the new spirit to him for a tasting. Murray was very positive and compared the results to the Ardbeg of the 1970s while recommending the owners to increase production. The chance meeting with Murray became the decision maker for the founders and in 2007 they purchased a small farm and moved the distillery from the private slaughter-house in the village of Stauning, to its current placement approximately 1.5 kilometers south of the village.

In March 2009 production finally restarted. The production was increased to 6-8000 liters of whisky a year, from the 2-400 liters the owners had originally planned for. In March the first grain was malted and in April the distillation started for the first time in the new surroundings. Since then Stauning Whisky has received the prize for the best European rye whisky below seven years in the Whisky magazine awards, and the best European single malt. The distillery has also won critical acclaim in Murray's "Whisky Bible", where their Peated 1st Edition received 94 points out of 100. It was described as a "Superstar whisky that give us all a reason to live".

== Production ==
The founders have chosen to do all parts of the production themselves. The grain is bought locally and the malting takes place in the form of floor malting in a process that takes about one week. After that the malt is dried in a kiln using hot air blown from below. For it to be a smoky whisky, the grain is dried with warm, smoky air from the burning of peat supplied by a Klosterlund Museum. This takes 2–3 days.

The grain is then ground, mashed and set aside for maturation in 3 days. Once this process is done the wort is first distilled on a 1000-liter pot still and afterwards on a 600-liter pot still. Following the double-distillation the new spirit is ready. The alcohol percent is no between 68 and 69 and is diluted to 63.5 percent before it is put on oak casks where it matures for a minimum of 3 years before it is finally bottled as whisky. When new whisky is distilled, it is a colorless liquid and has only taste and aroma of alcohol and grain. It is from aging in charred oak barrels the whisky gets its color, complexity and flavor.

In the years from 2009 to 2012 the distillery produced 6000 liters of new spirit a year. In the course of 2012 the production was more than doubled to 15.000 liters a year and finally in 2015 the distillery announced their plans for an expansion of the distillery capacity to 900.000 liters. This has led to an increase in the distillery workforce. From 2009 to 2012 the production was done by one man. In 2012 this increased to two men. In 2013 one of the founders were hired to take care of the administration and sales.

At least four times a week, guided tours of the distillery are offered, with a tasting of the three main whisky variants of the production: Traditional, Peated and Young Rye whiskies.

== Bottlings ==
All the whisky editions from Stauning Whisky are non-chill filtered and there is no color added in the process. All bottles come are of 50 cl.

Stauning Whisky produces three standard whisky editions:

- Traditional
  - Made of barley. This type is a mild, round and balanced whiskey. For Stauning Traditional smoke is not used during drying of the malt.
  - Awards:
    - 2013: The Whisky Bible 2014: Traditional 2nd Edition: 85 points
- Peated
  - Made of barley. This type is a smoked version, done by smoking the malt with peat smoke from peat excavated by Klosterlund Museum. .
  - Awards:
    - 2012: The Whisky Bible 2013: Peated 1st Edition: 94 points: Liquid Gold Award
    - 2013: national Review of Spirits Award: Peated 2nd Edition: Gold Medal
    - 2013: The Whisky Bible 2014: Peated 1st Edition: 94.5 points: Liquid Gold Award
- Young Rye
  - Made on rye. As something quite rare in the whiskey world, Rye whisky is made on malted rye. To use malted rye is not only rare, it also offers a taste of rye, apple and apricot with fragrances of fruit and cinnamon.
  - Awards:
    - 2013: International Review of Spirits Award: Platinum Medal
    - 2014: World Whiskies Award: Best European Rye under 7 years

The distillery has also launched a small variety of special edition whiskies.
