= John Stanning Jr =

English cricketer (1919–2007)

John Stanning
Cricket information
- Batting: Right-handed

Career statistics
Competition	First-class
Matches	16
Runs scored	403
Batting average	21.21
100s/50s	0/1
Top score	56*
Catches/stumpings	7/–
- Source: CricInfo, 7 November 2022

John Stanning (24 June 1919 – 29 May 2007) was an English first-class cricketer who played 16 matches in 1939 and 1946, nine for Worcestershire and seven for Oxford University.

Stanning was born in Nairobi and educated at Winchester College and Christ Church, Oxford. He made his cricketing debut for Oxford against the Minor Counties in early June 1939, scoring 39 and 9. In five further matches for the university that season, he usually got a start but could not go on to make any really significant scores, his best game being the Varsity Match against Cambridge when he made 38 in the first innings and 39 not out in the second to help set up a 45-run victory.

His next match, and indeed all the remaining games of his brief first-class career, was for Worcestershire, playing in the County Championship against Somerset. He made only 4 and 0 as Worcestershire suffered two collapses, from 112/2 to 130 all out in the first innings, and from 116/4 to 142 all out in the second, but Howorth's 4-27 off 9.4 eight-ball overs (this was the only season in which the eight-ball over was used in England) saved the day, and when he bowled Horace Hazell the match finished in a thrilling tie.

Worcestershire's next game, against Northamptonshire, was also a nail-biter as they squeezed to a one-wicket win, but this time Stanning's personal contribution was far greater: in the first innings he hit what was to be a career best 56 not out to rescue his team from 133/7. Perks and Martin then ran through the Northants batting order to bowl them out for 66, but Worcestershire made heavy weather of chasing 100, falling to a precarious 71/9 before White's 31 saw them home. Stanning had little to do with this, though, as he had been bowled for nought.

Stanning played three more times in 1939, but did very little of note on any of these occasions. The Second World War then intervened (during which he was commissioned in the Worcestershire Regiment with the rank of second lieutenant), and although he did return to play two games in 1946 (only the second of which, against Glamorgan, did he bat in), time had moved on and he was to make no more first-class appearances.

His father, John Stanning senior, played 26 first-class matches around the turn of the twentieth century, while his uncle Henry Stanning played 33 times for Lancashire between 1906 and 1908.

John Stanning died on 29 May 2007.
