= John Stanning senior =

English cricketer

John Stanning (10 October 1877 – 19 May 1929) was an English cricketer active from 1899 to 1903 who played for Lancashire and Cambridge University. He was born in Leyland, Lancashire, and died in Nakwin, Kenya. He appeared in 26 first-class matches as a righthanded batsman, scoring 964 runs with a highest score of 120 and held 19 catches. His father, also called John Stanning (1840–1904) was also an occasional cricketer and "a great supporter of cricket". He was the brother of Henry Stanning and the father of John Stanning junior. He was educated at Rugby School and Trinity College, Cambridge. During the First World War he was an officer in the Duke of Lancaster's Own Yeomanry.
