= Søren Olesen =

Danish teacher and politician (1891–1973)

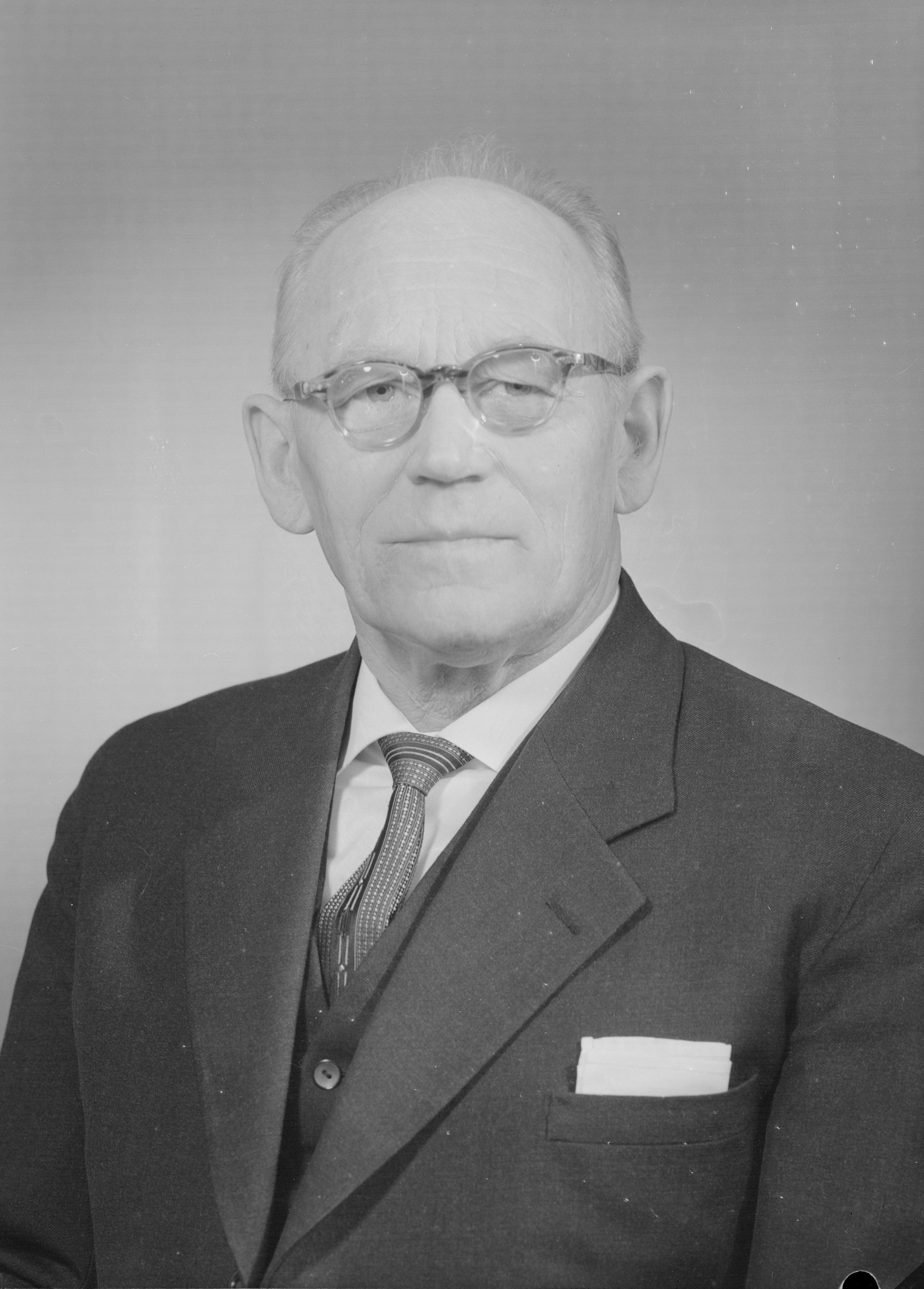

Minister of Interior
- In office 1957–1960
- Prime Minister: H. C. Hansen; Viggo Kampmann

Personal details
- Born: 27 September 1891 Giver, Aalborg, Denmark
- Died: 29 August 1973 (aged 81) Hirtshals, Denmark
- Resting place: Hirtshals
- Party: Justice Party
- Occupation: Teacher

Søren Olesen (27 September 1891– 29 August 1973) was a Danish teacher and politician. He was the minister of interior between 1957 and 1960.

== Biography ==
Olesen was born in Giver, Aalborg, on 27 September 1891. He received a degree in teaching in 1913 and worked as the headmaster at Horne Højskole in Vendsyssel between 1919 and 1929. He was a member of the Danish Parliament for the Justice Party for three terms (1945–1947, 1950–1951 and 1953–1960). He was the interior minister in the government under the Prime Ministers H. C. Hansen and Viggo Kampmann from 1957 to 1960.

Olesen retired from politics when the Justice Party lost the elections in 1960. He died in Hirtshals on 29 August 1973 and was buried there.
