= Johannes Friis-Skotte =

Danish politician

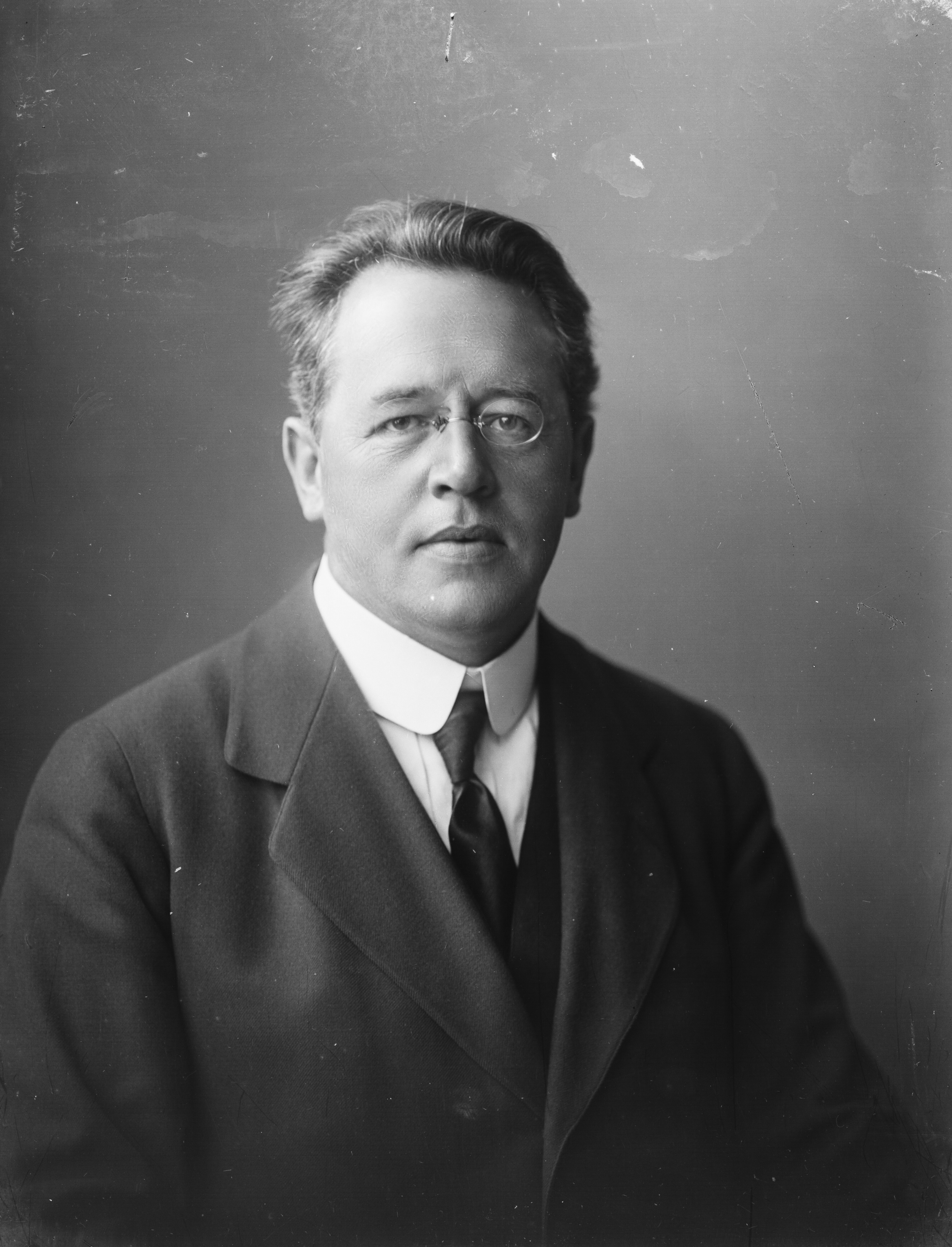
Johannes Friis-Skotte

Johannes Frederik Nicolai Friis-Skotte (1 December 1874 in Vordingborg – 15 December 1946 in Frederiksberg) was a Danish politician and minister. From 1908 to 1924 he was a member of the Frederiksberg district council. He was Minister of Public Works from 1924 to 1926 and from 1929 to 1935.
