= Hans Peter Hansen (politician) =

Danish journalist and politician (1872–1953)

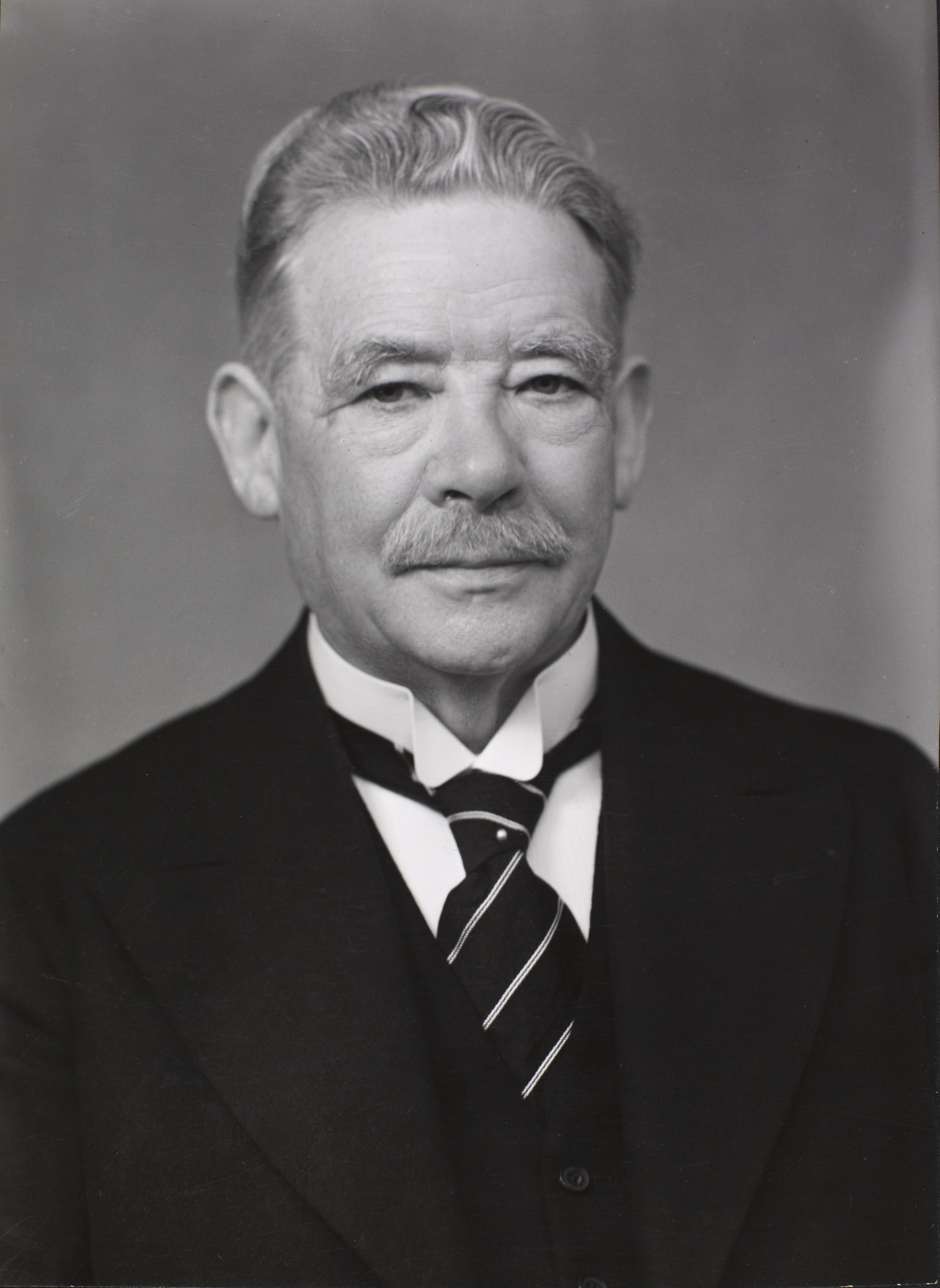

Minister of Finance
- In office 1 June 1933 – 1937

Minister of Defense
- In office 24 October 1932 – April 1933

Personal details
- Born: 6 October 1872
- Died: 17 January 1953 (aged 80) Charlottenlund, Copenhagen, Denmark
- Party: Social Democrats
- Occupation: Journalist

Hans Peter Hansen (1872–1953) was a Danish journalist and politician. He held various posts, including minister of defense, minister of finance and speaker of the Folketing. He was a member of the Social Democrats which he represented at the Parliament between 1913 and 1945.

== Biography ==
Hansen was born on 6 October 1872. He was a journalist by profession and worked in the social democrat papers based in Funen, Midtsjælland and Zealand. From 1894 he became a congress member of the Social Democrats and between 1906 and 1915 he was part of its main board. He was elected to the Parliament in 1913 where he served until 1945 when he resigned from the post. He became mayor of Slagelse in 1917 and was in office until 1927.

On 24 October 1932 he was named as the minister of defense and served in the post for six months until April 1933. On 1 June 1933 he was appointed minister of finance and remained in office until his resignation in 1937.

He died in Charlottenlund on 17 January 1953.
